= 1972 Philadelphia Phillies season =

Major League Baseball season

1972 Philadelphia Phillies
- League: National League
- Division: East
- Ballpark: Veterans Stadium
- City: Philadelphia
- Owners: R. R. M. Carpenter, Jr.
- General managers: John J. Quinn, Paul Owens
- Managers: Frank Lucchesi, Paul Owens
- Television: WPHL-TV
- Radio: WCAU (By Saam, Harry Kalas, Richie Ashburn)

The 1972 Philadelphia Phillies season was the 90th season in the history of the franchise, and the 2nd season for the Philadelphia Phillies at Veterans Stadium. The team finished with a record of 59–97, last place in the National League East.

== Offseason ==
The Phils made perhaps one of the most significant trades in their history on February 25, when they traded Rick Wise to the St. Louis Cardinals for Steve Carlton. Both teams were engaged in difficult contract negotiations with each pitcher. Carlton went on to win four Cy Young Awards with the Phillies, and Wise continued a solid career. Carlton won his first Cy Young Award on the 1972 Phillies who won only 59 games. Carlton was 27–10 and the team was 30–85 when Carlton did not pitch. No pitcher in the twentieth century has won as high a proportion of his team's victories (45.8%). Carlton also led the N.L. in ERA (1.97), strikeouts (310), and innings pitched (346.1).

=== Notable transactions ===
- October 22, 1971: Lowell Palmer was purchased from the Phillies by the Chicago White Sox.
- February 25, 1972: Rick Wise was traded by the Phillies to the St. Louis Cardinals for Steve Carlton.
- March 1, 1972: Rubén Amaro was released by the Phillies.

== Regular season ==
During the season, Steve Carlton became the last pitcher to win at least 25 games in one season for the Phillies in the 20th century.

On July 10, manager Frank Lucchesi was fired with the team at 26–50. Paul Owens, who had been promoted from farm director to GM a month earlier, became manager as well.

The Padres came close to a no-hitter against the Phillies on July 18, 1972; Steve Arlin came within one out before a ninth-inning two-out single by Denny Doyle broke up the bid.

The Phillies had hosted the 1952 All-Star Game, played July 9, 1952 at Shibe Park. The American League won 3 to 2 in five innings; the first rain shortened All-Star Game. The Phillies held their promotional Old-Timers Game on August 19, 1972. The Phillies invited all of the players from the 1952 game back to Philadelphia to complete the last four innings prior to the regular game with the Houston Astros.

The Old-Timers began in the "sixth inning" with the Veterans Stadium scoreboard showing the National League ahead 3–2 after five innings. Bobby Thomson, Enos Slaughter, Pee Wee Reese, Gran Hamner, and Robin Roberts played for the National League Old-Timers. Shantz pitched the first inning of the exhibition for the American League, which appeared as the sixth inning on the scoreboard. Shantz yielded five runs, while the American League scored only a run to "complete" the game, with the National League widening their margin of victory to 8-3.

Mike Schmidt made his major league debut on September 12.

=== Season standings ===
NL East
| Team | W | L | Pct. | GB | Home | Road |
|---|---|---|---|---|---|---|
| Pittsburgh Pirates | 96 | 59 | .619 | — | 49‍–‍29 | 47‍–‍30 |
| Chicago Cubs | 85 | 70 | .548 | 11 | 46‍–‍31 | 39‍–‍39 |
| New York Mets | 83 | 73 | .532 | 13½ | 41‍–‍37 | 42‍–‍36 |
| St. Louis Cardinals | 75 | 81 | .481 | 21½ | 40‍–‍37 | 35‍–‍44 |
| Montreal Expos | 70 | 86 | .449 | 26½ | 35‍–‍43 | 35‍–‍43 |
| Philadelphia Phillies | 59 | 97 | .378 | 37½ | 28‍–‍51 | 31‍–‍46 |

=== Record vs. opponents ===
1972 National League record Sources:
| Team | ATL | CHC | CIN | HOU | LAD | MON | NYM | PHI | PIT | SD | SF | STL |
|---|---|---|---|---|---|---|---|---|---|---|---|---|
| Atlanta | — | 5–7–1 | 9–9 | 7–7 | 7–8 | 4–8 | 7–5 | 6–6 | 6–6 | 6–11 | 7–11 | 6–6 |
| Chicago | 7–5–1 | — | 8–4 | 3–9 | 8–4 | 10–5 | 10–8 | 10–7 | 3–12 | 9–3 | 7–5 | 10–8 |
| Cincinnati | 9–9 | 4–8 | — | 11–6 | 9–5 | 8–4 | 8–4 | 10–2 | 8–4 | 8–10 | 10–5 | 10–2 |
| Houston | 7–7 | 9–3 | 6–11 | — | 7–11 | 8–4 | 6–6 | 9–3 | 3–9 | 12–2 | 13–5 | 4–8 |
| Los Angeles | 8–7 | 4–8 | 5–9 | 11–7 | — | 6–6 | 7–5 | 7–5 | 7–5 | 13–5 | 9–9 | 8–4 |
| Montreal | 8–4 | 5–10 | 4–8 | 4–8 | 6–6 | — | 6–12 | 10–6 | 6–12 | 6–6 | 6–6 | 9–8 |
| New York | 5–7 | 8–10 | 4–8 | 6–6 | 5–7 | 12–6 | — | 13–5 | 8–6 | 7–5 | 8–4 | 7–9 |
| Philadelphia | 6-6 | 7–10 | 2–10 | 3–9 | 5–7 | 6–10 | 5–13 | — | 5–13 | 6–6 | 6–6 | 8–7 |
| Pittsburgh | 6–6 | 12–3 | 4–8 | 9–3 | 5–7 | 12–6 | 6–8 | 13–5 | — | 10–2 | 9–3 | 10–8 |
| San Diego | 11–6 | 3–9 | 10–8 | 2–12 | 5–13 | 6–6 | 5–7 | 6–6 | 2–10 | — | 4–10 | 4–8 |
| San Francisco | 11–7 | 5–7 | 5–10 | 5–13 | 9–9 | 6–6 | 4–8 | 6–6 | 3–9 | 10–4 | — | 5–7 |
| St. Louis | 6–6 | 8–10 | 2–10 | 8–4 | 4–8 | 8–9 | 9–7 | 7–8 | 8–10 | 8–4 | 7–5 | — |

=== Notable transactions ===
- June 15, 1972: Andre Thornton and Joe Hoerner were traded by the Phillies to the Atlanta Braves for Jim Nash and Gary Neibauer.
- August 2, 1972: Woodie Fryman was selected off waivers from the Phillies by the Detroit Tigers.

==== Draft picks ====
- June 6, 1972: 1972 Major League Baseball draft
  - Tom Underwood was drafted by the Phillies in the 2nd round. Player signed August 27, 1972.
- June 6, 1972: Dan Boitano was drafted by the Phillies in the 1st round (17th pick) of the secondary phase, but did not sign.

=== Game log ===
Legend
| | Phillies win |
| | Phillies loss |
| | Postponement |
| **Bold** | Phillies team member |

1972 Game Log
Overall Record: 59–97
April (9–5)

| # | Date | Opponent | Score | Win | Loss | Save | Attendance | Record |
|---|---|---|---|---|---|---|---|---|
| – | April 7 | @ Cardinals | Cancelled (players' strike) | | | | | |
| – | April 8 | @ Cardinals | Cancelled (players' strike) | | | | | |
| – | April 9 | @ Cardinals | Cancelled (players' strike) | | | | | |
| – | April 10 | Expos | Cancelled (players' strike) | | | | | |
| – | April 12 | Expos | Cancelled (players' strike) | | | | | |
| – | April 14 | @ Cubs | Cancelled (players' strike) | | | | | |
| 1 | April 15 | @ Cubs | 4–2 | **Steve Carlton** (1–0) | Bill Hands (0–1) | **Joe Hoerner** (1) | 17,401 | 1–0 |
| 2 | April 16 | @ Cubs | 0–4 | Burt Hooton (1–0) | **Dick Selma** (0–1) | None | 9,583 | 1–1 |
| 3 | April 17 | Cardinals | 4–5 | Al Santorini (1–1) | **Joe Hoerner** (0–1) | None | 38,182 | 1–2 |
| 4 | April 18 | Cardinals | 6–3 | **Bill Champion** (1–0) | Scipio Spinks (0–1) | **Wayne Twitchell** (1) | 5,311 | 2–2 |
| 5 | April 19 | Cardinals | 1–0 | **Steve Carlton** (2–0) | Bob Gibson (0–1) | None | 8,184 | 3–2 |
| 6 | April 21 | Pirates | 2–3 (10) | Ramón Hernández (1–0) | **Chris Short** (0–1) | None | 13,864 | 3–3 |
| – | April 22 | Pirates | Postponed (rain); Makeup: July 29 as a traditional double-header | | | | | |
| 7 | April 23 | Pirates | 5–4 (11) | **Bucky Brandon** (1–0) | Bob Miller (0–1) | None | 43,438 | 4–3 |
| 8 | April 25 | @ Giants | 3–0 | **Steve Carlton** (3–0) | Juan Marichal (1–2) | None | 6,092 | 5–3 |
| 9 | April 26 | @ Giants | 6–8 (10) | Jerry Johnson (1–0) | **Bucky Brandon** (1–1) | None | 4,139 | 5–4 |
| 10 | April 27 | @ Giants | 7–6 | **Wayne Twitchell** (1–0) | Ron Bryant (0–1) | None | 3,671 | 6–4 |
| 11 | April 28 | @ Padres | 3–0 | **Woodie Fryman** (1–0) | Clay Kirby (2–1) | None | 7,272 | 7–4 |
| 12 | April 29 | @ Padres | 0–4 | Steve Arlin (1–3) | **Steve Carlton** (3–1) | None | 7,859 | 7–5 |
| 13 | April 30 (1) | @ Padres | 6–1 | **Barry Lersch** (1–0) | Bill Greif (1–3) | None | see 2nd game | 8–5 |
| 14 | April 30 (2) | @ Padres | 3–1 | **Bill Champion** (2–0) | Mike Corkins (0–1) | None | 8,411 | 9–5 |

May (7–19)

| # | Date | Opponent | Score | Win | Loss | Save | Attendance | Record |
|---|---|---|---|---|---|---|---|---|
| 15 | May 1 | @ Dodgers | 2–1 | **Dick Selma** (1–1) | Claude Osteen (2–1) | None | 15,015 | 10–5 |
| 16 | May 2 | @ Dodgers | 6–7 | Jim Brewer (1–0) | **Barry Lersch** (1–1) | None | 14,770 | 10–6 |
| 17 | May 3 | @ Dodgers | 5–1 | **Steve Carlton** (4–1) | Bill Singer (2–2) | None | 14,314 | 11–6 |
| 18 | May 5 | Giants | 3–2 | **Bill Champion** (3–0) | Juan Marichal (1–4) | None | 22,161 | 12–6 |
| 19 | May 6 | Giants | 1–3 | Sam McDowell (4–0) | **Dick Selma** (1–2) | None | 14,010 | 12–7 |
| 20 | May 7 | Giants | 8–3 | **Steve Carlton** (5–1) | Ron Bryant (0–2) | None | 44,880 | 13–7 |
| – | May 9 | Padres | Postponed (rain); Makeup: July 7 as a traditional double-header | | | | | |
| 21 | May 10 | Padres | 3–5 | Clay Kirby (3–1) | **Woodie Fryman** (1–1) | None | 7,601 | 13–8 |
| 22 | May 11 | Padres | 6–5 (12) | **Wayne Twitchell** (2–0) | Gary Ross (0–1) | None | 9,224 | 14–8 |
| 23 | May 12 | Dodgers | 1–6 | Don Sutton (5–0) | **Dick Selma** (1–3) | None | 24,205 | 14–9 |
| 24 | May 13 | Dodgers | 1–3 | Claude Osteen (4–1) | **Steve Carlton** (5–2) | Jim Brewer (3) | 27,003 | 14–10 |
| – | May 14 | Dodgers | Postponed (rain); Makeup: July 10 as a traditional double-header | | | | | |
| 25 | May 15 | Cubs | 4–0 | **Woodie Fryman** (2–1) | Ferguson Jenkins (3–3) | None | 8,133 | 15–10 |
| 26 | May 16 | Cubs | 1–8 | Burt Hooton (3–3) | **Bill Champion** (3–1) | None | 12,326 | 15–11 |
| 27 | May 17 | Cubs | 2–3 | Tom Phoebus (1–1) | **Steve Carlton** (5–3) | Dan McGinn (4) | 12,528 | 15–12 |
| 28 | May 19 | Mets | 3–8 | Buzz Capra (3–1) | **Dick Selma** (1–4) | Danny Frisella (3) | 20,451 | 15–13 |
| 29 | May 20 (1) | Mets | 1–3 | Jon Matlack (5–0) | **Woodie Fryman** (2–2) | None | see 2nd game | 15–14 |
| 30 | May 20 (2) | Mets | 1–2 | Jerry Koosman (1–3) | **Bill Champion** (3–2) | Tug McGraw (7) | 36,691 | 15–15 |
| 31 | May 21 | Mets | 3–4 | Tom Seaver (7–1) | **Steve Carlton** (5–4) | Danny Frisella (4) | 57,267 | 15–16 |
| 32 | May 22 | @ Expos | 3–6 | Mike Torrez (4–1) | **Barry Lersch** (1–2) | None | 17,676 | 15–17 |
| 33 | May 23 | @ Expos | 2–6 | Bill Stoneman (4–4) | **Dick Selma** (1–5) | None | 12,757 | 15–18 |
| 34 | May 24 | @ Expos | 1–4 | Carl Morton (2–4) | **Woodie Fryman** (2–3) | None | 9,341 | 15–19 |
| 35 | May 26 | @ Pirates | 4–6 | Nelson Briles (3–1) | **Steve Carlton** (5–5) | None | 25,164 | 15–20 |
| 36 | May 27 | @ Pirates | 2–1 (12) | **Bucky Brandon** (2–1) | Dave Giusti (1–4) | **Chris Short** (1) | 19,398 | 16–20 |
| 37 | May 28 | @ Pirates | 5–6 | Ramón Hernández (2–0) | **Joe Hoerner** (0–2) | None | 15,236 | 16–21 |
| 38 | May 29 (1) | @ Pirates | 3–7 | Ramón Hernández (3–0) | **Woodie Fryman** (2–4) | None | see 2nd game | 16–22 |
| 39 | May 29 (2) | @ Pirates | 2–4 | Bob Moose (3–2) | **Ken Reynolds** (0–1) | Dave Giusti (3) | 36,464 | 16–23 |
| 40 | May 30 | @ Mets | 0–7 | Jon Matlack (6–0) | **Steve Carlton** (5–6) | None | 17,598 | 16–24 |
| – | May 31 | @ Mets | Postponed (rain); Makeup: August 1 as a traditional double-header | | | | | |

June (8–18)

| # | Date | Opponent | Score | Win | Loss | Save | Attendance | Record |
|---|---|---|---|---|---|---|---|---|
| 41 | June 1 | @ Mets | 1–6 | Jim McAndrew (4–1) | **Dick Selma** (1–6) | None | 16,850 | 16–25 |
| 42 | June 2 | Reds | 3–6 (17) | Don Gullett (2–2) | **Wayne Twitchell** (2–1) | Pedro Borbón (4) | 16,251 | 16–26 |
| 43 | June 3 | Reds | 5–6 (10) | Tom Hall (3–1) | **Ken Reynolds** (0–2) | None | 16,623 | 16–27 |
| 44 | June 4 | Reds | 0–2 | Jack Billingham (3–6) | **Bill Champion** (3–3) | Clay Carroll (10) | 15,861 | 16–28 |
| 45 | June 6 | Astros | 3–4 | Dave Roberts (4–3) | **Woodie Fryman** (2–5) | Fred Gladding (5) | 8,237 | 16–29 |
| 46 | June 7 | Astros | 3–1 | **Steve Carlton** (6–6) | Jerry Reuss (3–5) | **Bucky Brandon** (1) | 10,712 | 17–29 |
| 47 | June 8 | Astros | 7–2 | **Bill Champion** (4–3) | Larry Dierker (5–3) | **Joe Hoerner** (2) | 20,155 | 18–29 |
| 48 | June 9 | Braves | 4–3 | **Chris Short** (1–1) | George Stone (0–4) | **Joe Hoerner** (3) | 17,082 | 19–29 |
| 49 | June 10 | Braves | 3–15 | Tom Kelley (4–5) | **Woodie Fryman** (2–6) | None | 23,242 | 19–30 |
| 50 | June 11 | Braves | 3–1 | **Steve Carlton** (7–6) | Ron Reed (4–7) | None | 32,468 | 20–30 |
| 51 | June 13 (1) | @ Reds | 4–8 | Tom Hall (4–1) | **Bill Champion** (4–4) | Clay Carroll (12) | see 2nd game | 20–31 |
| 52 | June 13 (2) | @ Reds | 2–4 | Ross Grimsley (3–1) | **Ken Reynolds** (0–3) | Pedro Borbón (6) | 31,509 | 20–32 |
| 53 | June 14 | @ Reds | 1–2 | Jack Billingham (4–6) | **Barry Lersch** (1–3) | Clay Carroll (13) | 16,127 | 20–33 |
| 54 | June 16 | @ Astros | 0–1 (11) | Tom Griffin (2–1) | **Dick Selma** (1–7) | None | 14,891 | 20–34 |
| 55 | June 17 | @ Astros | 5–10 | Dave Roberts (6–3) | **Woodie Fryman** (2–7) | Jim Ray (4) | 24,834 | 20–35 |
| 56 | June 18 | @ Astros | 0–10 | Jerry Reuss (5–5) | **Bill Champion** (4–5) | None | 20,768 | 20–36 |
| – | June 19 | @ Braves | Postponed (rain; Hurricane Agnes); Makeup: September 1 as a traditional double-header | | | | | |
| – | June 20 | @ Braves | Postponed (rain; Hurricane Agnes); Makeup: September 2 as a traditional double-header | | | | | |
| 57 | June 21 | @ Braves | 9–7 | **Bucky Brandon** (3–1) | Cecil Upshaw (1–2) | None | 10,195 | 21–36 |
| 58 | June 23 | @ Expos | 1–2 | Mike Torrez (8–3) | **Jim Nash** (1–2) | None | 15,124 | 21–37 |
| 59 | June 24 | @ Expos | 4–5 | John Strohmayer (1–1) | **Woodie Fryman** (2–8) | Mike Marshall (6) | 14,262 | 21–38 |
| 60 | June 25 | @ Expos | 1–0 | **Steve Carlton** (8–6) | Ernie McAnally (1–9) | None | 19,355 | 22–38 |
| 61 | June 26 | @ Cubs | 1–11 | Rick Reuschel (2–0) | **Bill Champion** (4–6) | None | 14,363 | 22–39 |
| 62 | June 27 (1) | @ Cubs | 3–6 | Ferguson Jenkins (9–6) | **Jim Nash** (1–3) | None | see 2nd game | 22–40 |
| 63 | June 27 (2) | @ Cubs | 7–4 | **Bucky Brandon** (4–1) | Juan Pizarro (4–3) | **Woodie Fryman** (1) | 31,408 | 23–40 |
| 64 | June 28 | Mets | 2–3 | Tom Seaver (10–4) | **Gary Neibauer** (0–1) | None | 26,545 | 23–41 |
| 65 | June 29 | Mets | 9–4 | **Steve Carlton** (9–6) | Gary Gentry (3–6) | None | 14,451 | 24–41 |
| 66 | June 30 | Cardinals | 1–4 | Scipio Spinks (5–4) | **Bill Champion** (4–7) | None | 16,257 | 24–42 |

July (10–19)

| # | Date | Opponent | Score | Win | Loss | Save | Attendance | Record |
|---|---|---|---|---|---|---|---|---|
| 67 | July 1 (1) | Cardinals | 4–6 | Bob Gibson (7–5) | **Jim Nash** (1–4) | None | see 2nd game | 24–43 |
| 68 | July 1 (2) | Cardinals | 0–1 | Al Santorini (4–6) | **Ken Reynolds** (0–4) | Diego Seguí (2) | 26,571 | 24–44 |
| 69 | July 2 | Cardinals | 3–7 | Reggie Cleveland (9–4) | **Gary Neibauer** (0–2) | Diego Seguí (3) | 20,103 | 24–45 |
| 70 | July 3 | Giants | 4–2 | **Steve Carlton** (10–6) | Don Carrithers (2–6) | None | 43,016 | 25–45 |
| 71 | July 4 | Giants | 1–2 | Jim Barr (2–2) | **Bill Champion** (4–8) | None | 6,098 | 25–46 |
| – | July 5 | Giants | Postponed (rain); Makeup: July 6 | | | | | |
| 72 | July 6 | Giants | 4–6 (10) | Jerry Johnson (6–5) | **Woodie Fryman** (2–9) | None | 5,466 | 25–47 |
| 73 | July 7 (1) | Padres | 4–2 | **Steve Carlton** (11–6) | Mike Corkins (0–5) | None | see 2nd game | 26–47 |
| 74 | July 7 (2) | Padres | 1–6 | Clay Kirby (6–8) | **Jim Nash** (1–5) | None | 18,106 | 26–48 |
| 75 | July 8 | Padres | 5–8 | Gary Ross (3–1) | **Dick Selma** (1–8) | None | 14,428 | 26–49 |
| 76 | July 9 | Padres | 4–5 | Bill Greif (4–11) | **Bucky Brandon** (4–2) | Fred Norman (1) | 18,445 | 26–50 |
| 77 | July 10 (1) | Dodgers | 4–6 (11) | Pete Richert (1–1) | **Mac Scarce** (0–1) | None | see 2nd game | 26–51 |
| 78 | July 10 (2) | Dodgers | 9–1 | **Woodie Fryman** (3–9) | Mike Strahler (0–2) | None | 20,159 | 27–51 |
| 79 | July 11 | Dodgers | 4–1 | **Steve Carlton** (12–6) | Don Sutton (10–5) | None | 18,443 | 28–51 |
| 80 | July 12 | Dodgers | 5–9 | Tommy John (8–4) | **Bill Champion** (4–9) | None | 15,533 | 28–52 |
| 81 | July 14 | @ Giants | 1–8 | Juan Marichal (4–10) | **Ken Reynolds** (0–5) | Randy Moffitt (3) | 8,607 | 28–53 |
| 82 | July 15 | @ Giants | 11–4 | **Bucky Brandon** (5–2) | Don McMahon (3–3) | **Dick Selma** (1) | 5,984 | 29–53 |
| 83 | July 16 | @ Giants | 7–10 | Jim Barr (3–2) | **Woodie Fryman** (3–10) | None | 16,299 | 29–54 |
| 84 | July 18 | @ Padres | 1–5 | Steve Arlin (8–10) | **Bill Champion** (4–10) | None | 4,764 | 29–55 |
| 85 | July 19 | @ Padres | 3–2 (11) | **Steve Carlton** (13–6) | Clay Kirby (6–10) | None | 6,787 | 30–55 |
| 86 | July 21 | @ Dodgers | 0–3 | Don Sutton (12–5) | **Ken Reynolds** (0–6) | None | 21,678 | 30–56 |
| 87 | July 22 | @ Dodgers | 3–4 | Bill Singer (4–8) | **Bill Champion** (4–11) | Jim Brewer (10) | 22,178 | 30–57 |
| 88 | July 23 | @ Dodgers | 2–0 | **Steve Carlton** (14–6) | Tommy John (8–5) | None | 21,288 | 31–57 |
| – | July 25 | **1972 Major League Baseball All-Star Game at Atlanta Stadium in Atlanta** | | | | | | |
| 89 | July 27 (1) | Cubs | 0–4 | Ferguson Jenkins (13–9) | **Ken Reynolds** (0–7) | None | see 2nd game | 31–58 |
| 90 | July 27 (2) | Cubs | 3–2 | **Dick Selma** (2–8) | Jack Aker (4–1) | None | 17,349 | 32–58 |
| 91 | July 28 | Cubs | 2–0 | **Steve Carlton** (15–6) | Milt Pappas (6–7) | None | 12,453 | 33–58 |
| 92 | July 29 (1) | Pirates | 5–2 | **Woodie Fryman** (4–10) | Steve Blass (11–5) | **Dick Selma** (2) | see 2nd game | 34–58 |
| 93 | July 29 (2) | Pirates | 2–3 | Luke Walker (4–5) | **Bucky Brandon** (5–3) | Dave Giusti (16) | 37,544 | 34–59 |
| 94 | July 30 | Pirates | 1–7 | Bruce Kison (5–3) | **Barry Lersch** (1–4) | None | 28,451 | 34–60 |
| 95 | July 31 | Pirates | 0–2 | Bob Moose (7–6) | **Ken Reynolds** (0–8) | None | 17,455 | 34–61 |

August (10–18)

| # | Date | Opponent | Score | Win | Loss | Save | Attendance | Record |
|---|---|---|---|---|---|---|---|---|
| 96 | August 1 (1) | @ Mets | 2–3 (18) | Ray Sadecki (2–0) | **Bucky Brandon** (5–4) | None | see 2nd game | 34–62 |
| 97 | August 1 (2) | @ Mets | 4–1 | **Steve Carlton** (16–6) | Jerry Koosman (7–7) | None | 31,846 | 35–62 |
| 98 | August 2 | @ Mets | 5–3 | **Mac Scarce** (1–1) | Tom Seaver (12–9) | **Dick Selma** (3) | 22,733 | 36–62 |
| 99 | August 3 | @ Mets | 4–1 | **Barry Lersch** (2–4) | Gary Gentry (5–8) | **Mac Scarce** (1) | 28,506 | 37–62 |
| 100 | August 4 | @ Cardinals | 8–3 | **Bill Wilson** (1–0) | Don Durham (0–4) | **Bucky Brandon** (2) | 14,234 | 38–62 |
| 101 | August 5 | @ Cardinals | 5–0 | **Steve Carlton** (17–6) | Reggie Cleveland (12–7) | None | 25,505 | 39–62 |
| 102 | August 6 | @ Cardinals | 0–6 | Al Santorini (6–7) | **Wayne Twitchell** (2–2) | None | 26,917 | 39–63 |
| 103 | August 8 | @ Pirates | 2–4 | Dock Ellis (10–5) | **Bill Champion** (4–12) | None | 18,228 | 39–64 |
| 104 | August 9 | @ Pirates | 2–0 | **Steve Carlton** (18–6) | Steve Blass (12–6) | None | 19,832 | 40–64 |
| 105 | August 11 | Expos | 1–4 | Mike Torrez (13–7) | **Wayne Twitchell** (2–3) | None | 20,190 | 40–65 |
| 106 | August 12 | Expos | 2–3 | Mike Marshall (11–3) | **Ken Reynolds** (0–9) | None | 20,392 | 40–66 |
| 107 | August 13 (1) | Expos | 2–1 | **Steve Carlton** (19–6) | Ernie McAnally (1–13) | None | see 2nd game | 41–66 |
| 108 | August 13 (2) | Expos | 3–8 | Balor Moore (4–5) | **Bill Champion** (4–13) | Mike Marshall (13) | 30,207 | 41–67 |
| 109 | August 15 | Reds | 0–3 | Don Gullett (4–7) | **Wayne Twitchell** (2–4) | None | 17,106 | 41–68 |
| 110 | August 16 | Reds | 2–8 | Jim McGlothlin (6–5) | **Ken Reynolds** (0–10) | Pedro Borbón (7) | 10,385 | 41–69 |
| 111 | August 17 | Reds | 9–4 | **Steve Carlton** (20–6) | Ross Grimsley (10–6) | None | 42,635 | 42–69 |
| 112 | August 18 | Astros | 3–4 | Dave Roberts (10–5) | **Bucky Brandon** (5–5) | Fred Gladding (13) | 11,707 | 42–70 |
| 113 | August 19 | Astros | 4–0 | **Wayne Twitchell** (3–4) | Larry Dierker (11–7) | None | 33,525 | 43–70 |
| 114 | August 20 | Astros | 1–3 | Don Wilson (10–8) | **Ken Reynolds** (0–11) | None | 13,712 | 43–71 |
| 115 | August 21 | Braves | 1–2 (11) | Phil Niekro (12–10) | **Steve Carlton** (20–7) | None | 41,212 | 43–72 |
| 116 | August 22 | Braves | 7–11 | Ron Reed (11–12) | **Bill Wilson** (1–1) | Pat Jarvis (2) | 10,408 | 43–73 |
| 117 | August 23 | Braves | 6–9 | Jim Hardin (3–0) | **Wayne Twitchell** (3–5) | Joe Hoerner (5) | 10,057 | 43–74 |
| 118 | August 25 | @ Reds | 1–6 | Don Gullett (6–7) | **Ken Reynolds** (0–12) | None | 32,017 | 43–75 |
| 119 | August 26 | @ Reds | 4–3 | **Steve Carlton** (21–7) | Jim McGlothlin (7–6) | **Mac Scarce** (2) | 34,028 | 44–75 |
| 120 | August 27 | @ Reds | 2–7 | Ross Grimsley (12–6) | **Wayne Twitchell** (3–6) | Pedro Borbón (10) | 37,167 | 44–76 |
| 121 | August 29 | @ Astros | 1–2 | Fred Gladding (5–5) | **Mac Scarce** (1–2) | None | 8,704 | 44–77 |
| 122 | August 30 | @ Astros | 3–5 | Jerry Reuss (9–10) | **Steve Carlton** (21–8) | Jim Ray (8) | 10,264 | 44–78 |
| 123 | August 31 | @ Astros | 1–5 | Larry Dierker (14–7) | **Wayne Twitchell** (3–7) | None | 7,197 | 44–79 |

September (13–16)

| # | Date | Opponent | Score | Win | Loss | Save | Attendance | Record |
|---|---|---|---|---|---|---|---|---|
| 124 | September 1 (1) | @ Braves | 11–1 | **Ken Reynolds** (1–12) | Ron Reed (11–13) | None | see 2nd game | 45–79 |
| 125 | September 1 (2) | @ Braves | 5–11 | Jimmy Freeman (1–0) | **Barry Lersch** (2–5) | None | 3,333 | 45–80 |
| 126 | September 2 (1) | @ Braves | 7–10 | Pat Jarvis (10–7) | **Dick Selma** (2–9) | Cecil Upshaw (10) | see 2nd game | 45–81 |
| 127 | September 2 (2) | @ Braves | 3–0 | **Dave Downs** (1–0) | Mike McQueen (0–2) | None | 5,239 | 46–81 |
| 128 | September 3 | @ Braves | 8–0 | **Steve Carlton** (22–8) | Jim Hardin (3–2) | None | 5,119 | 47–81 |
| 129 | September 4 (1) | @ Pirates | 0–10 | Steve Blass (16–6) | **Wayne Twitchell** (3–8) | None | see 2nd game | 47–82 |
| 130 | September 4 (2) | @ Pirates | 1–5 | Bruce Kison (8–5) | **Jim Nash** (1–6) | None | 26,627 | 47–83 |
| 131 | September 6 | Cardinals | 3–2 | **Ken Reynolds** (2–12) | Lowell Palmer (0–2) | None | 6,137 | 48–83 |
| 132 | September 7 | Cardinals | 2–1 | **Steve Carlton** (23–8) | Al Santorini (6–10) | None | 12,151 | 49–83 |
| 133 | September 8 | Cubs | 3–4 | Ferguson Jenkins (20–10) | **Bucky Brandon** (5–6) | None | 7,648 | 49–84 |
| 134 | September 9 | Cubs | 4–7 | Rick Reuschel (8–7) | **Barry Lersch** (2–6) | Bill Bonham (2) | 10,101 | 49–85 |
| 135 | September 10 | Cubs | 3–5 | Milt Pappas (13–7) | **Jim Nash** (1–7) | Jack Aker (14) | 12,248 | 49–86 |
| 136 | September 11 | Mets | 2–4 | Jerry Koosman (9–11) | **Steve Carlton** (23–9) | Tug McGraw (23) | 10,317 | 49–87 |
| 137 | September 12 | Mets | 3–4 | Jim McAndrew (11–5) | **Ken Reynolds** (2–13) | Danny Frisella (9) | 5,057 | 49–88 |
| 138 | September 13 | Mets | 6–11 | Tug McGraw (7–5) | **Dave Downs** (1–1) | None | 6,185 | 49–89 |
| 139 | September 15 | Expos | 5–3 | **Steve Carlton** (24–9) | Mike Torrez (16–10) | None | 20,120 | 50–89 |
| 140 | September 16 | Expos | 3–1 | **Wayne Twitchell** (4–8) | Balor Moore (8–8) | **Mac Scarce** (3) | 6,471 | 51–89 |
| 141 | September 17 | Expos | 3–2 | **Bucky Brandon** (6–6) | Mike Marshall (14–6) | None | 16,366 | 52–89 |
| 142 | September 19 | @ Cardinals | 1–2 (10) | Bob Gibson (17–10) | **Bucky Brandon** (6–7) | None | 6,978 | 52–90 |
| 143 | September 20 | @ Cardinals | 2–1 | **Steve Carlton** (25–9) | Rick Wise (15–16) | None | 5,569 | 53–90 |
| 144 | September 21 | @ Cardinals | 3–1 | **Wayne Twitchell** (5–8) | Jim Bibby (1–1) | **Mac Scarce** (4) | 4,719 | 54–90 |
| 145 | September 22 | @ Mets | 5–4 (11) | **Bucky Brandon** (7–7) | Tug McGraw (7–6) | None | 15,265 | 55–90 |
| 146 | September 23 | @ Mets | 3–5 | Jon Matlack (14–9) | **Jim Nash** (1–8) | None | 14,465 | 55–91 |
| 147 | September 24 | @ Mets | 1–2 | Tom Seaver (19–12) | **Steve Carlton** (25–10) | Tug McGraw (24) | 41,644 | 55–92 |
| 148 | September 26 | Pirates | 1–5 | Steve Blass (19–7) | **Bill Champion** (4–14) | None | 8,472 | 55–93 |
| 149 | September 27 | Pirates | 1–3 | Bruce Kison (9–7) | **Ken Reynolds** (2–14) | Luke Walker (2) | 5,335 | 55–94 |
| 150 | September 28 | Pirates | 2–1 | **Steve Carlton** (26–10) | Bob Moose (12–10) | None | 12,216 | 56–94 |
| – | September 29 | @ Expos | Postponed (rain); Makeup: September 30 as a traditional double-header | | | | | |
| 151 | September 30 (1) | @ Expos | 3–0 | **Barry Lersch** (3–6) | Mike Torrez (16–12) | None | see 2nd game | 57–94 |
| 152 | September 30 (2) | @ Expos | 4–8 | Balor Moore (9–8) | **Jim Nash** (1–9) | Mike Marshall (18) | 7,262 | 57–95 |

October (2–2)

| # | Date | Opponent | Score | Win | Loss | Save | Attendance | Record |
|---|---|---|---|---|---|---|---|---|
| 153 | October 1 | @ Expos | 6–10 | Ernie McAnally (6–16) | **Ken Reynolds** (2–15) | Tom Walker (2) | 10,314 | 57–96 |
| 154 | October 2 | @ Cubs | 3–4 | Rick Reuschel (10–8) | **Wayne Twitchell** (5–9) | Juan Pizarro (1) | 1,942 | 57–97 |
| 155 | October 3 | @ Cubs | 11–1 | **Steve Carlton** (27–10) | Dan McGinn (0–5) | None | 2,264 | 58–97 |
| 156 | October 4 | @ Cubs | 2–1 | **Barry Lersch** (4–6) | Bill Bonham (1–1) | None | 3,445 | 59–97 |

=== Roster ===
1972 Philadelphia Phillies
**Roster**
| **Pitchers**: 30 Bucky Brandon; 32 Steve Carlton; 31 Bill Champion; 35 Dave Downs; 35 Woodie Fryman; 43 Joe Hoerner; 34 Barry Lersch; 42 Jim Nash; 43 Gary Neibauer; 47 Ken Reynolds; 44 Mac Scarce; 39 Dick Selma; 41 Chris Short; 38 Bob Terlecki; 33 Wayne Twitchell; 37 Bill Wilson | **Catchers**: 6 John Bateman; 40 Bob Boone; 6 Tim McCarver; 9 Mike Ryan; **Infielders**: 10 Larry Bowa; 15 Denny Doyle; 17 Terry Harmon; 14 Tommy Hutton; 11 Deron Johnson; 12 Pete Koegel; 25 Joe Lis; 16 Don Money; 18 Craig Robinson; 22 Mike Schmidt | **Outfielders**: 40,22 Mike Anderson; 24 Byron Browne; 20 Roger Freed; 23 Oscar Gamble; 19 Greg Luzinski; 27 Willie Montañez; 24 Bill Robinson; 21 Ron Stone | **Manager**: 1 Frank Lucchesi; 8 Paul Owens; **Coaches**: 2 Brandy Davis; 3 Billy DeMars; 5 Doc Edwards; 2 George Myatt; 4 Ray Rippelmeyer |

== Player stats ==
=== Batting ===
==== Starters by position ====
Note: Pos = Position; G = Games played; AB = At bats; H = Hits; Avg. = Batting average; HR = Home runs; RBI = Runs batted in

| Pos | Player | G | AB | H | Avg. | HR | RBI |
|---|---|---|---|---|---|---|---|
| C | John Bateman | 82 | 252 | 56 | .222 | 3 | 17 |
| 1B | Tommy Hutton | 134 | 381 | 99 | .260 | 4 | 38 |
| 2B | Denny Doyle | 123 | 442 | 110 | .249 | 1 | 26 |
| SS | Larry Bowa | 152 | 579 | 145 | .250 | 1 | 31 |
| 3B | Don Money | 152 | 536 | 119 | .222 | 15 | 52 |
| LF | Greg Luzinski | 150 | 563 | 158 | .281 | 18 | 68 |
| CF | Willie Montañez | 147 | 531 | 131 | .247 | 13 | 64 |
| RF | Roger Freed | 73 | 129 | 29 | .225 | 6 | 18 |

==== Other batters ====
Note: G = Games played; AB = At bats; H = Hits; Avg. = Batting average; HR = Home runs; RBI = Runs batted in

| Player | G | AB | H | Avg. | HR | RBI |
|---|---|---|---|---|---|---|
| Deron Johnson | 96 | 230 | 49 | .213 | 9 | 31 |
| Terry Harmon | 73 | 218 | 62 | .284 | 2 | 13 |
| Bill Robinson | 82 | 188 | 45 | .239 | 8 | 21 |
| Tim McCarver | 45 | 152 | 36 | .237 | 2 | 14 |
| Joe Lis | 62 | 140 | 34 | .243 | 6 | 18 |
| Oscar Gamble | 74 | 135 | 32 | .237 | 1 | 13 |
| Mike Ryan | 46 | 106 | 19 | .179 | 2 | 10 |
| Mike Anderson | 36 | 103 | 20 | .194 | 2 | 5 |
| Ron Stone | 41 | 54 | 9 | .167 | 0 | 3 |
| Bob Boone | 16 | 51 | 14 | .275 | 1 | 4 |
| Pete Koegel | 41 | 49 | 7 | .143 | 0 | 1 |
| Mike Schmidt | 13 | 34 | 7 | .206 | 1 | 3 |
| Byron Browne | 21 | 21 | 4 | .190 | 0 | 0 |
| Craig Robinson | 5 | 15 | 3 | .200 | 0 | 0 |

=== Pitching ===
==== Starting pitchers ====
Note: G = Games pitched; IP = Innings pitched; W = Wins; L = Losses; ERA = Earned run average; SO = Strikeouts

| Player | G | IP | W | L | ERA | SO |
|---|---|---|---|---|---|---|
| Steve Carlton | 41 | 346.1 | 27 | 10 | 1.97 | 310 |
| Ken Reynolds | 33 | 154.1 | 2 | 15 | 4.26 | 87 |
| Bill Champion | 30 | 132.2 | 4 | 14 | 5.09 | 54 |
| Woodie Fryman | 23 | 119.2 | 4 | 10 | 4.36 | 69 |
| Jim Nash | 9 | 37.1 | 0 | 8 | 6.27 | 15 |
| Dave Downs | 4 | 23.0 | 1 | 1 | 2.74 | 5 |

==== Other pitchers ====
Note: G = Games pitched; IP = Innings pitched; W = Wins; L = Losses; ERA = Earned run average; SO = Strikeouts

| Player | G | IP | W | L | ERA | SO |
|---|---|---|---|---|---|---|
| Wayne Twitchell | 49 | 139.2 | 5 | 9 | 4.06 | 112 |
| Bucky Brandon | 42 | 104.1 | 7 | 7 | 3.45 | 67 |
| Barry Lersch | 36 | 100.2 | 4 | 6 | 3.04 | 48 |
| Dick Selma | 46 | 98.2 | 2 | 9 | 5.56 | 58 |
| Gary Neibauer | 9 | 18.2 | 0 | 2 | 5.30 | 7 |

==== Relief pitchers ====
Note: G = Games pitched; W = Wins; L = Losses; SV = Saves; ERA = Earned run average; SO = Strikeouts

| Player | G | W | L | SV | ERA | SO |
|---|---|---|---|---|---|---|
| Mac Scarce | 31 | 1 | 2 | 4 | 3.44 | 40 |
| Bill Wilson | 23 | 1 | 1 | 0 | 3.30 | 18 |
| Chris Short | 19 | 1 | 1 | 1 | 3.91 | 20 |
| Joe Hoerner | 15 | 0 | 2 | 3 | 2.08 | 12 |
| Bob Terlecki | 9 | 0 | 0 | 0 | 4.73 | 5 |

== Farm system ==
| Level | Team | League | Manager |
|---|---|---|---|
| AAA | Eugene Emeralds | Pacific Coast League | Andy Seminick |
| AA | Reading Phillies | Eastern League | Jim Bunning |
| A | Spartanburg Phillies | Western Carolinas League | Bob Wellman |
| A-Short Season | Auburn Phillies | New York–Penn League | Nolan Campbell |
| Rookie | Pulaski Phillies | Appalachian League | Harry Lloyd |

LEAGUE CHAMPIONS: Spartanburg
