= 1972 Atlanta Braves season =

1972 Atlanta Braves
- League: National League
- Division: West
- Ballpark: Atlanta Stadium
- City: Atlanta
- Record: 70–84 (.455)
- Divisional place: 4th
- Owners: William Bartholomay
- General managers: Paul Richards, Eddie Robinson
- Managers: Lum Harris, Eddie Mathews
- Television: WSB-TV
- Radio: WSB (Ernie Johnson, Milo Hamilton)

The 1972 Atlanta Braves season was the seventh season in Atlanta along with the 102nd season as a franchise overall.

== Offseason ==
- December 2, 1971: Hal King was traded by the Braves to the Texas Rangers for Paul Casanova.

== Regular season ==
=== Notable transactions ===
- May 11, 1972: Steve Barber was released by the Braves.
- June 6, 1972: Preston Hanna was drafted by the Braves in the 1st round (11th pick) of the 1972 Major League Baseball draft.
- June 15, 1972: Jim Nash and Gary Neibauer were traded by the Braves to the Philadelphia Phillies for Andre Thornton and Joe Hoerner.
- June 29, 1972: Orlando Cepeda was traded by the Braves to the Oakland Athletics for Denny McLain.

=== Front-office and managerial turnover ===
The 1972 Braves' 70–84 season, following on the heels of a hopeful, 82–80 mark in 1971, resulted in the in-season firings of both general manager Paul Richards, on the job since January 1967, and field manager Luman Harris, who was in the midst of his fifth season as the team's skipper. Richards and Harris were a management team that had worked in tandem for 15 years with the Chicago White Sox, Baltimore Orioles and Houston Astros before coming to the Braves.

Atlanta was 18–22 on June 1 when Richards was demoted from GM to special assignment scout; his replacement was another longtime associate, Eddie Robinson, 51, the director of the club's farm system. Harris was fired August 6, with the Braves standing at 47–57 (.452), in fourth place in the NL West Division and 16 games behind the Cincinnati Reds. His successor was another internal hire, Eddie Mathews, 40, the team's first-base coach and perennial All-Star third baseman from its glory days in Milwaukee during the 1950s.

=== Season standings ===
NL West
Team	W	L	Pct.	GB	Home	Road
Cincinnati Reds	95	59	.617	—	42‍–‍34	53‍–‍25
Houston Astros	84	69	.549	10½	41‍–‍36	43‍–‍33
Los Angeles Dodgers	85	70	.548	10½	41‍–‍34	44‍–‍36
Atlanta Braves	70	84	.455	25	36‍–‍41	34‍–‍43
San Francisco Giants	69	86	.445	26½	34‍–‍43	35‍–‍43
San Diego Padres	58	95	.379	36½	26‍–‍54	32‍–‍41

=== Record vs. opponents ===
1972 National League record Sources:
Team	ATL	CHC	CIN	HOU	LAD	MON	NYM	PHI	PIT	SD	SF	STL
Atlanta	—	5–7–1	9–9	7–7	7–8	4–8	7–5	6–6	6–6	6–11	7–11	6–6
Chicago	7–5–1	—	8–4	3–9	8–4	10–5	10–8	10–7	3–12	9–3	7–5	10–8
Cincinnati	9–9	4–8	—	11–6	9–5	8–4	8–4	10–2	8–4	8–10	10–5	10–2
Houston	7–7	9–3	6–11	—	7–11	8–4	6–6	9–3	3–9	12–2	13–5	4–8
Los Angeles	8–7	4–8	5–9	11–7	—	6–6	7–5	7–5	7–5	13–5	9–9	8–4
Montreal	8–4	5–10	4–8	4–8	6–6	—	6–12	10–6	6–12	6–6	6–6	9–8
New York	5–7	8–10	4–8	6–6	5–7	12–6	—	13–5	8–6	7–5	8–4	7–9
Philadelphia	6-6	7–10	2–10	3–9	5–7	6–10	5–13	—	5–13	6–6	6–6	8–7
Pittsburgh	6–6	12–3	4–8	9–3	5–7	12–6	6–8	13–5	—	10–2	9–3	10–8
San Diego	11–6	3–9	10–8	2–12	5–13	6–6	5–7	6–6	2–10	—	4–10	4–8
San Francisco	11–7	5–7	5–10	5–13	9–9	6–6	4–8	6–6	3–9	10–4	—	5–7
St. Louis	6–6	8–10	2–10	8–4	4–8	8–9	9–7	7–8	8–10	8–4	7–5	—

=== Roster ===
1972 Atlanta Braves
Roster
Pitchers: 24 Steve Barber; 24 Jimmy Freeman; 27 Jim Hardin; 43 Joe Hoerner; 39 Tom House; 33 Pat Jarvis; 23 Larry Jaster; 36 Tom Kelley; 30 Denny McLain; 22 Mike McQueen; 23 Jim Nash; 31 Gary Neibauer; 35 Phil Niekro; 38 Ron Reed; 37 Ron Schueler; 40 George Stone; 34 Cecil Upshaw	Catchers: 15 Paul Casanova; 4 Bob Didier; 32 Earl Williams; Infielders: 44 Hank Aaron; 4 Larvell Blanks; 2 Jim Breazeale; 30 Orlando Cepeda; 11 Darrell Evans; 7 Gil Garrido; 19 Rod Gilbreath; 16 Sonny Jackson; 17 Félix Millán; 9 Marty Perez	Outfielders: 12 Dusty Baker; 45 Oscar Brown; 25 Rico Carty; 48 Ralph Garr; 28 Mike Lum; 18 Rowland Office	Manager: 26 Lum Harris; 41 Eddie Mathews; Coaches: 5 Lew Burdette; 8 Jim Busby; 41 Eddie Mathews; 3 Ken Silvestri

== Player stats ==
=== Batting ===
==== Starters by position ====
Note: Pos = Position; G = Games played; AB = At bats; H = Hits; Avg. = Batting average; HR = Home runs; RBI = Runs batted in

Pos	Player	G	AB	H	Avg.	HR	RBI
C	Earl Williams	151	565	146	.258	28	87
1B	Hank Aaron	129	449	119	.265	34	77
2B	Félix Millán	125	498	128	.257	1	38
SS	Marty Perez	141	479	109	.228	1	28
3B	Darrell Evans	125	418	106	.254	19	71
LF	Rico Carty	86	271	75	.277	6	29
CF	Dusty Baker	127	446	143	.321	17	76
RF	Mike Lum	123	369	84	.228	9	38

==== Other batters ====
Note: G = Games played; AB = At bats; H = Hits; Avg. = Batting average; HR = Home runs; RBI = Runs batted in

Player	G	AB	H	Avg.	HR	RBI
Ralph Garr	134	554	180	.325	12	53
Oscar Brown	76	164	37	.226	3	16
Paul Casanova	49	136	28	.206	2	10
Sonny Jackson	60	126	30	.238	0	8
Larvell Blanks	33	85	28	.329	1	7
Jim Breazeale	52	85	21	.247	5	17
Orlando Cepeda	28	84	25	.298	4	9
Gil Garrido	40	75	20	.267	0	7
Bob Didier	13	40	12	.300	0	5
Rod Gilbreath	18	38	9	.237	0	1
Rowland Office	2	5	2	.400	0	0

=== Pitching ===
==== Starting pitchers ====
Note: G = Games pitched; IP = Innings pitched; W = Wins; L = Losses; ERA = Earned run average; SO = Strikeouts

Player	G	IP	W	L	ERA	SO
Phil Niekro	38	282.1	16	12	3.06	164
Ron Reed	31	213.0	11	15	3.93	111
Jimmy Freeman	6	36.0	2	2	6.00	18

==== Other pitchers ====
Note: G = Games pitched; IP = Innings pitched; W = Wins; L = Losses; ERA = Earned run average; SO = Strikeouts

Player	G	IP	W	L	ERA	SO
Ron Schueler	37	144.2	5	8	3.67	96
Tom Kelley	27	116.1	5	7	4.56	59
George Stone	31	111.0	6	11	5.51	63
Pat Jarvis	37	98.2	11	7	4.10	56
Jim Hardin	26	79.2	5	2	4.41	25
Mike McQueen	23	78.1	0	5	4.60	40
Denny McLain	15	54.0	3	5	6.50	21
Jim Nash	11	31.1	1	1	5.46	10
Larry Jaster	5	12.1	1	1	5.11	6

==== Relief pitchers ====
Note: G = Games pitched; W = Wins; L = Losses; SV = Saves; ERA = Earned run average; SO = Strikeouts

Player	G	W	L	SV	ERA	SO
Cecil Upshaw	42	3	5	13	3.69	23
Joe Hoerner	25	1	3	2	6.56	19
Gary Neibauer	8	0	0	0	7.27	8
Tom House	8	0	0	2	2.89	7
Steve Barber	5	0	0	0	5.74	6

== Awards and honors ==
All-Star Game

- Hank Aaron, Outfield, Starter

== Farm system ==
Level	Team	League	Manager
AAA	Richmond Braves	International League	Clyde King
AA	Savannah Braves	Southern League	Clint Courtney
A	Greenwood Braves	Western Carolinas League	Paul Snyder
Rookie	Wytheville Braves	Appalachian League	Eddie Haas
