= 1972 Montreal Expos season =

1972 Montreal Expos
- League: National League
- Division: East
- Ballpark: Jarry Park
- City: Montreal
- Record: 70–86 (.449)
- Divisional place: 5th
- Owners: Charles Bronfman; John McHale (president)
- General managers: Jim Fanning
- Managers: Gene Mauch
- Television: CBC Television (Dave Van Horne, Jackie Robinson); Télévision de Radio-Canada (Jean-Pierre Roy, Guy Ferron)
- Radio: CFCF (English) (Dave Van Horne, Russ Taylor); CKAC (French) (Jean-Pierre Roy, Jacques Doucet)

The 1972 Montreal Expos season was the fourth season in the history of the franchise. The Expos finished in fifth place in the National League East with a record of 70–86, 26 1/2 games behind the Pittsburgh Pirates.

== Offseason ==
- November 29, 1971: Tom Walker was drafted by the Expos from the Baltimore Orioles in the 1971 rule 5 draft.
- December 6, 1971: Adolfo Phillips was purchased by the Expos from the Cleveland Indians.
- January 28, 1972: Claude Raymond was released by the Expos.
- March 24, 1972: César Gutiérrez was purchased by the Expos from the Detroit Tigers.

== Spring training ==
The Expos held spring training at West Palm Beach Municipal Stadium in West Palm Beach, Florida, a facility they shared with the Atlanta Braves. It was their fourth season at the stadium. The following season, the Expos would move their spring training activities to City Island Ball Park in Daytona Beach, Florida, where they would train through 1980 before returning to West Palm Beach Municipal Stadium for the 1981 through 1997 seasons.

== Regular season ==
- October 2, 1972: Bill Stoneman pitched his second career no-hitter (the final score of this one was also 7–0) in the first game of a doubleheader against the New York Mets at Jarry Park. The no-hitter was the first ever pitched outside the United States. Future broadcaster Tim McCarver was Stoneman's catcher.

=== Season standings ===
NL East
Team	W	L	Pct.	GB	Home	Road
Pittsburgh Pirates	96	59	.619	—	49‍–‍29	47‍–‍30
Chicago Cubs	85	70	.548	11	46‍–‍31	39‍–‍39
New York Mets	83	73	.532	13½	41‍–‍37	42‍–‍36
St. Louis Cardinals	75	81	.481	21½	40‍–‍37	35‍–‍44
Montreal Expos	70	86	.449	26½	35‍–‍43	35‍–‍43
Philadelphia Phillies	59	97	.378	37½	28‍–‍51	31‍–‍46

=== Record vs. opponents ===
1972 National League record Sources:
Team	ATL	CHC	CIN	HOU	LAD	MON	NYM	PHI	PIT	SD	SF	STL
Atlanta	—	5–7–1	9–9	7–7	7–8	4–8	7–5	6–6	6–6	6–11	7–11	6–6
Chicago	7–5–1	—	8–4	3–9	8–4	10–5	10–8	10–7	3–12	9–3	7–5	10–8
Cincinnati	9–9	4–8	—	11–6	9–5	8–4	8–4	10–2	8–4	8–10	10–5	10–2
Houston	7–7	9–3	6–11	—	7–11	8–4	6–6	9–3	3–9	12–2	13–5	4–8
Los Angeles	8–7	4–8	5–9	11–7	—	6–6	7–5	7–5	7–5	13–5	9–9	8–4
Montreal	8–4	5–10	4–8	4–8	6–6	—	6–12	10–6	6–12	6–6	6–6	9–8
New York	5–7	8–10	4–8	6–6	5–7	12–6	—	13–5	8–6	7–5	8–4	7–9
Philadelphia	6-6	7–10	2–10	3–9	5–7	6–10	5–13	—	5–13	6–6	6–6	8–7
Pittsburgh	6–6	12–3	4–8	9–3	5–7	12–6	6–8	13–5	—	10–2	9–3	10–8
San Diego	11–6	3–9	10–8	2–12	5–13	6–6	5–7	6–6	2–10	—	4–10	4–8
San Francisco	11–7	5–7	5–10	5–13	9–9	6–6	4–8	6–6	3–9	10–4	—	5–7
St. Louis	6–6	8–10	2–10	8–4	4–8	8–9	9–7	7–8	8–10	8–4	7–5	—

=== Notable transactions ===
- April 5, 1972: Rusty Staub was traded by the Expos to the New York Mets for Ken Singleton, Mike Jorgensen, and Tim Foli.
- July 10, 1972: Bobby Wine was released by the Expos.

==== Draft picks ====
- June 6, 1972: 1972 Major League Baseball draft
  - Ellis Valentine was drafted by the Expos in the 2nd round.
  - Gary Carter was drafted by the Expos in the 3rd round.
  - Mike Hart was drafted by the Expos in the 11th round.
  - Keith Drumright was drafted by the Expos in the 18th round, but did not sign.

== Roster ==
1972 Montreal Expos
Roster
Pitchers: 42 Joe Gilbert; 23 Denny Lemaster; 28 Mike Marshall; 21 Ernie McAnally; 15 Balor Moore; 44 Carl Morton; 18 Steve Renko; 26 Bill Stoneman; 36 John Strohmayer; 24 Mike Torrez; 20 Tom Walker	Catchers: 2 John Bateman; 12 John Boccabella; 22 Terry Humphrey; 2 Tim McCarver; Infielders: 3 Bob Bailey; 23 Hal Breeden; 19 Tim Foli; 33 Ron Hunt; 16 Mike Jorgensen; 39 Coco Laboy; 25 Héctor Torres; 7 Bobby Wine	Outfielders: 8 Boots Day; 35 Jim Fairey; 6 Ron Fairly; 11 Pepe Mangual; 5 Clyde Mashore; 29 Ken Singleton; 43 Ron Woods	Manager: 4 Gene Mauch; Coaches: 34 Jimmy Bragan; 14 Larry Doby; 32 Cal McLish; 31 Jerry Zimmerman

== Player stats ==
= Indicates team leader

=== Batting ===
==== Starters by position ====
Note: Pos = Position; G = Games played; AB = At bats; H = Hits; Avg. = Batting average; HR = Home runs; RBI = Runs batted in

Pos	Player	G	AB	H	Avg.	HR	RBI
C	Terry Humphrey	69	215	40	.186	1	9
1B	Mike Jorgensen	113	372	86	.231	13	47
2B	Ron Hunt	129	443	112	.253	0	18
SS	Tim Foli	149	540	130	.241	2	35
3B	Bob Bailey	143	489	114	.233	16	57
LF	Ken Singleton	142	507	139	.274	14	50
CF	Boots Day	128	386	90	.233	0	30
RF	Ron Fairly	140	446	124	.278	17	68

==== Other batters ====
Note: G = Games played; AB = At bats; H = Hits; Avg. = Batting average; HR = Home runs; RBI = Runs batted in

Player	G	AB	H	Avg.	HR	RBI
Tim McCarver	77	239	60	.251	5	20
Ron Woods	97	221	57	.258	10	31
John Boccabella	83	207	47	.227	1	10
Héctor Torres	83	181	28	.155	2	7
Clyde Mashore	93	176	40	.227	3	23
Jim Fairey	86	141	33	.234	1	15
Hal Breeden	42	87	20	.230	3	10
Coco Laboy	28	69	18	.261	3	14
John Bateman	18	29	7	.241	0	3
Bobby Wine	34	18	4	.222	0	0
Pepe Mangual	8	11	3	.273	0	0

=== Pitching ===
==== Starting pitchers ====
Note: G = Games pitched; IP = Innings pitched; W = Wins; L = Losses; ERA = Earned run average; SO = Strikeouts

Player	G	IP	W	L	ERA	SO
Bill Stoneman	36	250.2	12	14	2.98	171
Mike Torrez	34	243.1	16	12	3.33	112
Carl Morton	27	172.0	7	13	3.92	51
Ernie McAnally	29	170.0	6	15	3.81	102
Balor Moore	22	147.2	9	9	3.47	161

==== Other pitchers ====
Note: G = Games pitched; IP = Innings pitched; W = Wins; L = Losses; ERA = Earned run average; SO = Strikeouts

Player	G	IP	W	L	ERA	SO
Steve Renko	30	97.0	1	10	5.20	66

==== Relief pitchers ====
Note: G = Games pitched; W = Wins; L = Losses; SV = Saves; ERA = Earned run average; SO = Strikeouts

Player	G	W	L	SV	ERA	SO
Mike Marshall	65	14	8	18	1.78	95
John Strohmayer	48	1	2	3	3.52	50
Tom Walker	46	2	2	2	2.89	42
Joe Gilbert	22	0	1	0	8.45	25
Denny Lemaster	13	2	0	0	7.78	13
Héctor Torres	1	0	0	0	27.00	0

== Awards and honors ==
1972 Major League Baseball All-Star Game

- Bill Stoneman, Pitcher, Reserve

== Farm system ==
Level	Team	League	Manager
AAA	Peninsula Whips	International League	Bill Adair
AA	Québec Carnavals	Eastern League	Karl Kuehl
A	West Palm Beach Expos	Florida State League	Lance Nichols
A-Short Season	Jamestown Falcons	New York–Penn League	Walt Hriniak
Rookie	Cocoa Expos	Florida East Coast League	Pat Daugherty
