= 1972 St. Louis Cardinals season =

Major League Baseball season

1972 St. Louis Cardinals
- League: National League
- Division: East
- Ballpark: Busch Memorial Stadium
- City: St. Louis, Missouri
- Record: 75–81 (.481)
- Divisional place: 4th
- Owners: August "Gussie" Busch
- General managers: Bing Devine
- Managers: Red Schoendienst
- Television: KSD-TV
- Radio: KMOX (Jack Buck, Mike Shannon, Mike Walden)

The 1972 St. Louis Cardinals season was the team's 91st season in St. Louis, Missouri and its 81st season in the National League. The Cardinals went 75–81 during the season and finished fourth in the National League East, 21 1/2 games behind the Pittsburgh Pirates.

== Offseason ==
- February 25, 1972: Steve Carlton was traded by the Cardinals to the Philadelphia Phillies for Rick Wise.

== Regular season ==
Pitcher Bob Gibson won a Gold Glove this year.

=== Season standings ===
NL East
Team	W	L	Pct.	GB	Home	Road
Pittsburgh Pirates	96	59	.619	—	49‍–‍29	47‍–‍30
Chicago Cubs	85	70	.548	11	46‍–‍31	39‍–‍39
New York Mets	83	73	.532	13½	41‍–‍37	42‍–‍36
St. Louis Cardinals	75	81	.481	21½	40‍–‍37	35‍–‍44
Montreal Expos	70	86	.449	26½	35‍–‍43	35‍–‍43
Philadelphia Phillies	59	97	.378	37½	28‍–‍51	31‍–‍46

=== Record vs. opponents ===
1972 National League record Sources:
Team	ATL	CHC	CIN	HOU	LAD	MON	NYM	PHI	PIT	SD	SF	STL
Atlanta	—	5–7–1	9–9	7–7	7–8	4–8	7–5	6–6	6–6	6–11	7–11	6–6
Chicago	7–5–1	—	8–4	3–9	8–4	10–5	10–8	10–7	3–12	9–3	7–5	10–8
Cincinnati	9–9	4–8	—	11–6	9–5	8–4	8–4	10–2	8–4	8–10	10–5	10–2
Houston	7–7	9–3	6–11	—	7–11	8–4	6–6	9–3	3–9	12–2	13–5	4–8
Los Angeles	8–7	4–8	5–9	11–7	—	6–6	7–5	7–5	7–5	13–5	9–9	8–4
Montreal	8–4	5–10	4–8	4–8	6–6	—	6–12	10–6	6–12	6–6	6–6	9–8
New York	5–7	8–10	4–8	6–6	5–7	12–6	—	13–5	8–6	7–5	8–4	7–9
Philadelphia	6-6	7–10	2–10	3–9	5–7	6–10	5–13	—	5–13	6–6	6–6	8–7
Pittsburgh	6–6	12–3	4–8	9–3	5–7	12–6	6–8	13–5	—	10–2	9–3	10–8
San Diego	11–6	3–9	10–8	2–12	5–13	6–6	5–7	6–6	2–10	—	4–10	4–8
San Francisco	11–7	5–7	5–10	5–13	9–9	6–6	4–8	6–6	3–9	10–4	—	5–7
St. Louis	6–6	8–10	2–10	8–4	4–8	8–9	9–7	7–8	8–10	8–4	7–5	—

=== Opening Day starters ===
- Matty Alou
- Lou Brock
- José Cruz
- Bob Gibson
- Joe Hague
- Dal Maxvill
- Ted Simmons
- Ted Sizemore
- Joe Torre

=== Notable transactions ===
- May 15, 1972: Don Shaw was traded by the Cardinals to the Oakland Athletics for Dwain Anderson.
- May 16, 1972: Lowell Palmer was signed as a free agent by the Cardinals.
- May 18, 1972: Marty Martínez was traded by the Cardinals to the Oakland Athletics for Brant Alyea.
- June 6, 1972: Dan Larson was drafted by the Cardinals in the 1st round (21st pick) of the 1972 Major League Baseball draft.
- June 7, 1972: Diego Seguí was sent to the Cardinals by the Oakland Athletics as part of a conditional deal.
- July 23, 1972: Brant Alyea was returned to the Oakland Athletics by the Cardinals.
- August 30, 1972: Dal Maxvill was traded by the Cardinals to the Oakland Athletics for a player to be named later and Joe Lindsey (minors). The Athletics completed the deal by sending Gene Dusen (minors) to the Cardinals on October 27.
- September 18, 1972: Lowell Palmer was selected off waivers from the Cardinals by the Cleveland Indians.

=== Roster ===
1972 St. Louis Cardinals
Roster
Pitchers: 42 Ray Bare; 48 Jim Bibby; 47 Lance Clemons; 22 Reggie Cleveland; 25 Tony Cloninger; 36 John Cumberland; 28 Moe Drabowsky; 46 Don Durham; 28 Rich Folkers; 45 Bob Gibson; 31 Joe Grzenda; 36 Santiago Guzmán; 37 Dennis Higgins; 39 Al Hrabosky; 30 Charlie Hudson; 44 Lowell Palmer; 56 Tim Plodinec; 34 Al Santorini; 35 Diego Seguí; 44 Don Shaw; 24 Scipio Spinks; 40 Rick Wise	Catchers: 18 Skip Jutze; 15 Jerry McNertney; 23 Ted Simmons; Infielders: 16 Ron Allen; 17 Matty Alou; 19 Dwain Anderson; 16 Donn Clendenon; 4 Ed Crosby; 10 Mike Fiore; 12 Joe Hague; 25 Mick Kelleher; 11 Marty Martínez; 27 Dal Maxvill; 44,47 Ken Reitz; 41 Ted Sizemore; 32 Bill Stein; 9 Joe Torre; 10 Mike Tyson	Outfielders: 21 Brant Alyea; 20 Lou Brock; 12 Bernie Carbo; 38 José Cruz; 26 Luis Meléndez; 21 Jorge Roque; 17 Bill Voss	Manager: 2 Red Schoendienst; Coaches: 8 Vern Benson (bullpen); 14 Ken Boyer (hitting); 3 George Kissell (first base); 33 Barney Schultz (pitching); 50 Lee Thomas (third base)

== Player stats ==
=== Batting ===
==== Starters by position ====
Note: Pos = Position; G = Games played; AB = At bats; H = Hits; Avg. = Batting average; HR = Home runs; RBI = Runs batted in

Pos	Player	G	AB	H	Avg.	HR	RBI
C	Ted Simmons	152	594	180	.303	16	96
1B	Matty Alou	108	404	127	.314	3	31
2B	Ted Sizemore	120	439	116	.264	2	38
SS	Dal Maxvill	105	276	61	.221	1	23
3B	Joe Torre	149	544	157	.289	11	81
LF	Lou Brock	153	621	193	.311	3	42
CF	José Cruz	117	332	78	.235	2	23
RF	Bernie Carbo	99	302	78	.258	7	34

==== Other batters ====
Note: G = Games played; AB = At bats; H = Hits; Avg. = Batting average; HR = Home runs; RBI = Runs batted in

Player	G	AB	H	Avg.	HR	RBI
Luis Meléndez	118	332	79	.238	5	28
Ed Crosby	101	276	60	.217	0	19
Donn Clendenon	61	136	26	.191	4	9
Dwain Anderson	57	135	36	.267	1	8
Ken Reitz	21	78	28	.359	0	10
Joe Hague	27	76	18	.237	3	11
Skip Jutze	21	71	17	.239	0	5
Jorge Roque	32	67	7	.104	1	5
Mick Kelleher	23	63	10	.159	0	1
Jerry McNertney	39	48	10	.208	0	9
Mike Tyson	13	37	7	.189	0	0
Bill Stein	14	35	11	.314	2	3
Brant Alyea	13	19	3	.158	0	1
Bill Voss	11	15	4	.267	0	3
Ron Allen	7	11	1	.091	1	1
Mike Fiore	17	10	1	.100	0	1
Marty Martínez	9	7	3	.429	0	2

=== Pitching ===
==== Starting pitchers ====
Note: G = Games pitched; IP = Innings pitched; W = Wins; L = Losses; ERA = Earned run average; SO = Strikeouts

Player	G	IP	W	L	ERA	SO
Bob Gibson	34	278.0	19	11	2.46	208
Rick Wise	35	269.0	16	16	3.11	142
Reggie Cleveland	33	230.2	14	15	3.94	153
Scipio Spinks	16	118.0	5	5	2.67	93
Don Durham	10	47.2	2	7	4.34	35
Jim Bibby	6	40.1	1	3	3.35	28

==== Other pitchers ====
Note: G = Games pitched; IP = Innings pitched; W = Wins; L = Losses; ERA = Earned run average; SO = Strikeouts

Player	G	IP	W	L	ERA	SO
Al Santorini	30	133.2	8	11	4.11	72
Lance Clemons	3	5.1	0	1	10.12	2

==== Relief pitchers ====
Note: G = Games pitched; W = Wins; L = Losses; SV = Saves; ERA = Earned run average; SO = Strikeouts

Player	G	W	L	SV	ERA	SO
Diego Seguí	33	3	1	9	3.07	54
Joe Grzenda	30	1	0	0	5.66	15
Moe Drabowski	30	1	1	2	2.60	22
Tony Cloninger	17	0	2	0	5.19	11
Lowell Palmer	16	0	3	0	3.89	25
Dennis Higgins	15	1	2	1	3.97	20
John Cumberland	14	1	1	0	6.65	7
Ray Bare	14	0	1	1	0.54	5-
Charlie Hudson	12	1	0	0	5.11	4
Rich Folkers	9	1	0	0	3.38	7
Don Shaw	8	0	1	0	9.00	0
Al Hrabosky	5	1	0	0	0.00	9
Santiago Guzmán	1	0	0	0	9.00	0
Tim Plodinec	1	0	0	0	27.00	0

== Awards and honors ==
=== League leaders ===
- Lou Brock, National League leader, stolen bases, 63

== Farm system ==
Level	Team	League	Manager
AAA	Tulsa Oilers	American Association	Jack Krol
AA	Arkansas Travelers	Texas League	Fred Koenig
A	Modesto Reds	California League	Tom Burgess
A	St. Petersburg Cardinals	Florida State League	Roy Majtyka
A	Cedar Rapids Cardinals	Midwest League	Gary Geiger
Rookie	GCL Cardinals	Gulf Coast League	Bobby Dews
Rookie	GCL Red Birds	Gulf Coast League	Julio Gotay

LEAGUE CHAMPIONS: Modesto
