= 1972 New York Mets season =

1972 New York Mets
- League: National League
- Division: East
- Ballpark: Shea Stadium
- City: New York
- Record: 83–73 (.532)
- Divisional place: 3rd
- Owners: Joan Whitney Payson
- General manager: Bob Scheffing
- Manager: Yogi Berra
- Television: WOR-TV
- Radio: WHN (Ralph Kiner, Lindsey Nelson, Bob Murphy)

The 1972 New York Mets season was the 11th regular season for the Mets, who played home games at Shea Stadium. Led by manager Yogi Berra, the team had an 83–73 record and finished in third place in the National League East, thirteen and a half games behind the first place Pittsburgh Pirates. Despite their winning record, the Mets were outscored 578–528 on the season, a run differential of −50; their Pythagorean expectation, based on that differential, was a 72–84 record.

== Offseason ==
=== Death of Gil Hodges/Appointment of Yogi Berra ===
On April 2, 1972, manager Gil Hodges and coaches Rube Walker, Joe Pignatano and Eddie Yost, were returning to their motel in West Palm Beach, Florida after a round of golf when Hodges suddenly collapsed and died from a heart attack, two days short of his forty-eighth birthday. The Mets wore a black armband on the left sleeves of their uniform jerseys during the 1972 season in honor of Hodges. On April 6, Yogi Berra was introduced as the Mets' new manager.

Notable offseason transactions:

- December 10, 1971: Nolan Ryan, Frank Estrada, Don Rose, and Leroy Stanton were traded by the Mets to the California Angels for Jim Fregosi.
- April 5, 1972: Ken Singleton, Tim Foli, and Mike Jorgensen were traded by the Mets to the Montreal Expos for Rusty Staub.

Also, returning to the club for their first full seasons that year was Jon Matlack, a left-handed starting pitcher (the fourth overall pick in the 1967 Major League Baseball draft), and John Milner, a left-handed, power-hitting, first baseman/outfielder.

== Regular season ==
=== Season summary ===
On May 11, the Mets acquired Willie Mays from the San Francisco Giants for minor league pitcher Charlie Williams and cash. The acquisition of Mays had been a longtime dream of Joan Payson, who had been a New York Giants fan in her youth. With Mays no longer pulling the weight of his large contract, Giants owner Horace Stoneham made him available, and Payson could not resist.

The club got off to a sizzling start in 1972, playing better than .700 ball through early June and peaking at 25–7 (.781) on May 21, leading the Pittsburgh Pirates by six games. However, Jim Fregosi suffered a broken thumb in spring training and never got on track, posting a .232 batting average. Second baseman Ken Boswell slumped to .211. John Milner flashed some power with 17 home runs but hit just .238. Tommie Agee, batting .291 on the day of the Mays trade, suddenly found himself sharing center field with Mays, and, along with being increasingly hampered by knee problems, finished at only .227. Rusty Staub led all starters with a .293 batting average, but was limited to just 66 games because of a broken hand. Mays did hit a respectable .267, but his fielding ability significantly declined. In addition, along with Staub, a series of disabling injuries to Bud Harrelson, Jerry Grote, and Cleon Jones brought the team up short and dropped them into their third consecutive third-place finish, 13.5 games behind Pittsburgh.

Among pitchers, Tom Seaver went 21–12, Rookie of the Year Jon Matlack was 15–10 and Jim McAndrew 11–8, but Jerry Koosman went 11–12 as his earned run average jumped to 4.14, and Gary Gentry slumped to 7–10 with a 4.04 ERA. Tug McGraw continued as the bullpen ace, with 8 wins and 27 saves and a 1.70 ERA.

On September 30, Jon Matlack gave up a double to Pirates legend Roberto Clemente. It was Clemente's 3,000th and final big-league hit prior to his death in a plane crash on New Year's Eve.

=== Season standings ===
NL East
Team	W	L	Pct.	GB	Home	Road
Pittsburgh Pirates	96	59	.619	—	49‍–‍29	47‍–‍30
Chicago Cubs	85	70	.548	11	46‍–‍31	39‍–‍39
New York Mets	83	73	.532	13½	41‍–‍37	42‍–‍36
St. Louis Cardinals	75	81	.481	21½	40‍–‍37	35‍–‍44
Montreal Expos	70	86	.449	26½	35‍–‍43	35‍–‍43
Philadelphia Phillies	59	97	.378	37½	28‍–‍51	31‍–‍46

=== Record vs. opponents ===
1972 National League record Sources:
Team	ATL	CHC	CIN	HOU	LAD	MON	NYM	PHI	PIT	SD	SF	STL
Atlanta	—	5–7–1	9–9	7–7	7–8	4–8	7–5	6–6	6–6	6–11	7–11	6–6
Chicago	7–5–1	—	8–4	3–9	8–4	10–5	10–8	10–7	3–12	9–3	7–5	10–8
Cincinnati	9–9	4–8	—	11–6	9–5	8–4	8–4	10–2	8–4	8–10	10–5	10–2
Houston	7–7	9–3	6–11	—	7–11	8–4	6–6	9–3	3–9	12–2	13–5	4–8
Los Angeles	8–7	4–8	5–9	11–7	—	6–6	7–5	7–5	7–5	13–5	9–9	8–4
Montreal	8–4	5–10	4–8	4–8	6–6	—	6–12	10–6	6–12	6–6	6–6	9–8
New York	5–7	8–10	4–8	6–6	5–7	12–6	—	13–5	8–6	7–5	8–4	7–9
Philadelphia	6-6	7–10	2–10	3–9	5–7	6–10	5–13	—	5–13	6–6	6–6	8–7
Pittsburgh	6–6	12–3	4–8	9–3	5–7	12–6	6–8	13–5	—	10–2	9–3	10–8
San Diego	11–6	3–9	10–8	2–12	5–13	6–6	5–7	6–6	2–10	—	4–10	4–8
San Francisco	11–7	5–7	5–10	5–13	9–9	6–6	4–8	6–6	3–9	10–4	—	5–7
St. Louis	6–6	8–10	2–10	8–4	4–8	8–9	9–7	7–8	8–10	8–4	7–5	—

=== Opening Day starters ===
- Tommie Agee
- Ken Boswell
- Jim Fregosi
- Jerry Grote
- Bud Harrelson
- Cleon Jones
- Ed Kranepool
- Tom Seaver
- Rusty Staub

=== Notable transactions ===
- May 11: Charlie Williams and $50,000 were traded to the San Francisco Giants for Willie Mays.

=== Roster ===
1972 New York Mets
Roster
Pitchers: 38 Buzz Capra; 34 Danny Frisella; 39 Gary Gentry; 36 Jerry Koosman; 32 Jon Matlack; 43 Jim McAndrew; 45 Tug McGraw; 39 Tommy Moore; 44 Bob Rauch; 33 Ray Sadecki; 41 Tom Seaver; 40 Brent Strom; 42 Chuck Taylor; 22 Hank Webb	Catchers: 10 Duffy Dyer; 15 Jerry Grote; 35 Joe Nolan; Infielders: 1 Lute Barnes; 5,24 Jim Beauchamp; 12 Ken Boswell; 2 Jim Fregosi; 11 Wayne Garrett; 3 Bud Harrelson; 7 Ed Kranepool; 17 Ted Martínez; 9 Bill Sudakis	Outfielders: 20 Tommie Agee; 25 Don Hahn; 21 Cleon Jones; 18 Dave Marshall; 24 Willie Mays; 28 John Milner; 16 Dave Schneck; 4 Rusty Staub	Manager: 8 Yogi Berra; Coaches: 52 Joe Pignatano; 55 Sheriff Robinson; 54 Rube Walker; 53 Eddie Yost

== Player stats ==
=== Batting ===
==== Starters by position ====
Note: Pos = Position; G = Games played; AB = At bats; H = Hits; Avg. = Batting average; HR = Home runs; RBI = Runs batted in

Pos	Player	G	AB	H	Avg.	HR	RBI
C	Duffy Dyer	94	325	75	.231	8	36
1B	Ed Kranepool	122	327	88	.269	8	34
2B	Ken Boswell	100	355	75	.211	9	33
SS	Bud Harrelson	115	418	90	.215	1	24
3B	Jim Fregosi	101	340	79	.232	5	32
LF	John Milner	117	362	86	.238	17	38
CF	Tommie Agee	114	422	96	.227	13	47
RF	Rusty Staub	66	239	70	.293	9	38

==== Other batters ====
Note: G = Games played; AB = At bats; H = Hits; Avg. = Batting average; HR = Home runs; RBI = Runs batted in

Player	G	AB	H	Avg.	HR	RBI
Cleon Jones	106	375	92	.245	5	52
Ted Martínez	103	330	74	.224	1	19
Wayne Garrett	111	298	69	.232	2	29
Jerry Grote	64	205	43	.210	3	21
Willie Mays	69	195	52	.267	8	19
Dave Marshall	72	156	39	.250	4	11
Dave Schneck	37	123	23	.187	3	10
Jim Beauchamp	58	120	29	.242	5	19
Lute Barnes	24	72	17	.236	0	6
Bill Sudakis	18	49	7	.143	1	7
Don Hahn	17	37	6	.162	0	1
Joe Nolan	4	10	0	.000	0	0

=== Pitching ===
==== Starting pitchers ====
Note: G = Games pitched; IP = Innings pitched; W = Wins; L = Losses; ERA = Earned run average; SO = Strikeouts

Player	G	IP	W	L	ERA	SO
Tom Seaver	35	262.0	21	12	2.92	249
Jon Matlack	34	244.0	15	10	2.32	169
Gary Gentry	32	164.0	7	10	4.01	120
Jerry Koosman	34	163.0	11	12	4.14	147
Jim McAndrew	28	160.2	11	8	2.80	81

==== Other pitchers ====
Note: G = Games pitched; IP = Innings pitched; W = Wins; L = Losses; ERA = Earned run average; SO = Strikeouts

Player	G	IP	W	L	ERA	SO
Buzz Capra	14	53.0	3	2	4.58	45
Brent Strom	11	30.1	0	3	6.82	20
Hank Webb	6	18.1	0	0	4.42	15
Tommy Moore	3	12.1	0	0	2.92	5

==== Relief pitchers ====
Note: G = Games pitched; Innings pitched; W = Wins; L = Losses; SV = Saves; ERA = Earned run average; SO = Strikeouts

Player	G	IP	W	L	SV	ERA	SO
Tug McGraw	54	106.0	8	6	27	1.70	92
Danny Frisella	39	67.1	5	8	9	3.34	46
Ray Sadecki	34	75.2	2	1	0	3.09	38
Chuck Taylor	20	31.0	0	0	2	5.52	9
Bob Rauch	19	27.0	0	1	1	5.00	23

== Awards and honors ==
=== All-Stars ===
1972 Major League Baseball All-Star Game

- Willie Mays, starting center fielder
- Tug McGraw, reserve
- Tom Seaver, reserve

== Farm system ==
Level	Team	League	Manager
AAA	Tidewater Tides	International League	Hank Bauer
AA	Memphis Blues	Texas League	John Antonelli
A	Visalia Mets	California League	Joe Frazier
A	Pompano Beach Mets	Florida State League	Gordon Mackenzie
A-Short Season	Batavia Trojans	New York–Penn League	Wilbur Huckle
Rookie	Marion Mets	Appalachian League	Chuck Hiller

LEAGUE CHAMPIONS: Tidewater
