= 1972 San Francisco Giants season =

1972 San Francisco Giants
- League: National League
- Division: West
- Ballpark: Candlestick Park
- City: San Francisco, California
- Owners: Horace Stoneham
- General managers: Jerry Donovan
- Managers: Charlie Fox
- Television: KTVU (Lon Simmons, Bill Thompson)
- Radio: KSFO (Lon Simmons, Bill Thompson)

The 1972 San Francisco Giants season was the Giants' 90th year in Major League Baseball, 15th in San Francisco, and 13th at Candlestick Park. The defending division champions, the Giants fell to fifth in the National League West with a record of 69–86. It was their first losing season in San Francisco and the franchise's first losing season since 1957, their final year in New York City.

== Offseason ==
- November 29, 1971: Gaylord Perry and Frank Duffy were traded by the Giants to the Cleveland Indians for Sam McDowell.
- February 2, 1972: Hal Lanier was purchased from the Giants by the New York Yankees.
- March 27, 1972: Rich Robertson was released by the Giants.

== Regular season ==
On May 11, 41-year-old franchise legend Willie Mays was traded to the New York Mets for minor league pitcher Charlie Williams and US$50,000. At the time, the Giants franchise was losing money. Owner Horace Stoneham could not guarantee Mays an income after retirement.

=== Season standings ===
NL West
Team	W	L	Pct.	GB	Home	Road
Cincinnati Reds	95	59	.617	—	42‍–‍34	53‍–‍25
Houston Astros	84	69	.549	10½	41‍–‍36	43‍–‍33
Los Angeles Dodgers	85	70	.548	10½	41‍–‍34	44‍–‍36
Atlanta Braves	70	84	.455	25	36‍–‍41	34‍–‍43
San Francisco Giants	69	86	.445	26½	34‍–‍43	35‍–‍43
San Diego Padres	58	95	.379	36½	26‍–‍54	32‍–‍41

=== Record vs. opponents ===
1972 National League record Sources:
Team	ATL	CHC	CIN	HOU	LAD	MON	NYM	PHI	PIT	SD	SF	STL
Atlanta	—	5–7–1	9–9	7–7	7–8	4–8	7–5	6–6	6–6	6–11	7–11	6–6
Chicago	7–5–1	—	8–4	3–9	8–4	10–5	10–8	10–7	3–12	9–3	7–5	10–8
Cincinnati	9–9	4–8	—	11–6	9–5	8–4	8–4	10–2	8–4	8–10	10–5	10–2
Houston	7–7	9–3	6–11	—	7–11	8–4	6–6	9–3	3–9	12–2	13–5	4–8
Los Angeles	8–7	4–8	5–9	11–7	—	6–6	7–5	7–5	7–5	13–5	9–9	8–4
Montreal	8–4	5–10	4–8	4–8	6–6	—	6–12	10–6	6–12	6–6	6–6	9–8
New York	5–7	8–10	4–8	6–6	5–7	12–6	—	13–5	8–6	7–5	8–4	7–9
Philadelphia	6-6	7–10	2–10	3–9	5–7	6–10	5–13	—	5–13	6–6	6–6	8–7
Pittsburgh	6–6	12–3	4–8	9–3	5–7	12–6	6–8	13–5	—	10–2	9–3	10–8
San Diego	11–6	3–9	10–8	2–12	5–13	6–6	5–7	6–6	2–10	—	4–10	4–8
San Francisco	11–7	5–7	5–10	5–13	9–9	6–6	4–8	6–6	3–9	10–4	—	5–7
St. Louis	6–6	8–10	2–10	8–4	4–8	8–9	9–7	7–8	8–10	8–4	7–5	—

=== Opening Day lineup ===
- Bobby Bonds
- Tito Fuentes
- Fran Healy
- Ken Henderson
- Dave Kingman
- Juan Marichal
- Willie Mays
- Willie McCovey
- Chris Speier

=== Notable transactions ===
- May 11, 1972: Willie Mays was traded by the Giants to the New York Mets for Charlie Williams and $50,000.
- June 6, 1972: Brian Asselstine was drafted by the Giants in the 7th round of the 1972 Major League Baseball draft, but did not sign.
- June 6, 1972: Lenn Sakata was drafted by the Giants in the 14th round of the 1972 Major League Baseball draft, but did not sign.

=== Roster ===
1972 San Francisco Giants
Roster
Pitchers: 33 Jim Barr; 32 Ron Bryant; 30 Don Carrithers; 41 John Cumberland; 35 Jerry Johnson; 27 Juan Marichal; 48 Sam McDowell; 47 Don McMahon; 39 Randy Moffitt; 42 John Morris; 41 Frank Reberger; 38 Elías Sosa; 29 Steve Stone; 38 Charlie Williams; 42 Jim Willoughby	Catchers: 18 Russ Gibson; 6 Fran Healy; 14 Dave Rader; Infielders: 17 Chris Arnold; 22 Dámaso Blanco; 23 Tito Fuentes; 10 Al Gallagher; 21 Ed Goodson; 16 Jim Ray Hart; 26 Dave Kingman; 44 Willie McCovey; 35 Chris Speier; 12 Gary Thomasson	Outfielders: 25 Bobby Bonds; 15 Ken Henderson; 19 Jim Howarth; 31 Garry Maddox; 36 Gary Matthews; 24 Willie Mays; 22 Jimmy Rosario; 20 Bernie Williams	Manager: 7 Charlie Fox; Coaches: 5 Joey Amalfitano; 8 Andy Gilbert; 47 Don McMahon; 1 John McNamara; 3 Ozzie Virgil

== Player stats ==
= Indicates team leader

=== Batting ===
==== Starters by position ====
Note: Pos = Position; G = Games played; AB = At bats; H = Hits; Avg. = Batting average; HR = Home runs; RBI = Runs batted in

Pos	Player	G	AB	H	Avg.	HR	RBI
C	Dave Rader	133	459	119	.259	6	41
1B	Willie McCovey	81	263	56	.213	14	35
2B	Tito Fuentes	152	572	151	.264	7	53
SS	Chris Speier	150	562	151	.269	15	71
3B	Al Gallagher	82	233	52	.223	2	18
LF	Ken Henderson	130	439	113	.257	18	51
CF	Garry Maddox	125	458	122	.266	12	58
RF	Bobby Bonds	153	626	162	.259	26	80

==== Other batters ====
Note: G = Games played; AB = At bats; H = Hits; Avg. = Batting average; HR = Home runs; RBI = Runs batted in

Player	G	AB	H	Avg.	HR	RBI
Dave Kingman	135	472	106	.225	29	83
Ed Goodson	58	150	42	.280	6	30
Jim Howarth	74	119	28	.235	1	7
Fran Healy	45	99	15	.152	1	8
Chris Arnold	51	84	19	.226	1	4
Jim Ray Hart	24	79	24	.304	5	8
Bernie Williams	46	68	13	.191	3	9
Gary Matthews	20	62	18	.290	4	14
Willie Mays	19	49	9	.184	0	3
Gary Thomasson	10	27	9	.333	0	1
Dámaso Blanco	39	20	7	.350	0	2
Russ Gibson	5	12	2	.167	0	3
Jimmy Rosario	7	2	0	.000	0	0

=== Pitching ===
==== Starting pitchers ====
Note: G = Games pitched; IP = Innings pitched; W = Wins; L = Losses; ERA = Earned run average; SO = Strikeouts

Player	G	IP	W	L	ERA	SO
Ron Bryant	35	214.0	14	7	2.90	107
Juan Marichal	25	165.0	6	16	3.71	72
Sam McDowell	28	164.1	10	8	4.33	122
Jim Willoughby	11	87.2	6	4	2.36	40

==== Other pitchers ====
Note: G = Games pitched; IP = Innings pitched; W = Wins; L = Losses; ERA = Earned run average; SO = Strikeouts

Player	G	IP	W	L	ERA	SO
Jim Barr	44	179.0	8	10	2.87	86
Steve Stone	27	123.2	6	8	2.98	85
Frank Reberger	20	99.1	3	4	3.99	52
Don Carrithers	25	90.0	4	8	5.80	42
John Cumberland	9	25.0	0	4	8.64	8
Charlie Williams	3	9.1	0	2	8.68	3

==== Relief pitchers ====
Note: G = Games pitched; W = Wins; L = Losses; SV = Saves; ERA = Earned run average; SO = Strikeouts

Player	G	W	L	SV	ERA	SO
Jerry Johnson	48	8	6	8	4.42	57
Don McMahon	44	3	3	5	3.71	45
Randy Moffitt	40	1	5	4	3.69	37
Elias Sosa	8	0	1	3	2.30	10
John Morris	7	0	0	0	4.26	5

== Awards and honors ==
All-Star Game

- Chris Speier, Shortstop, Reserve
- Charlie Fox, Coach, National League

== Farm system ==
Level	Team	League	Manager
AAA	Phoenix Giants	Pacific Coast League	Jim Davenport
AA	Amarillo Giants	Texas League	Dennis Sommers
A	Fresno Giants	California League	Frank Funk
A	Decatur Commodores	Midwest League	Jim McKnight
A	Anderson Giants	Western Carolinas League	Max Lanier
Rookie	Great Falls Giants	Pioneer League	Dick Wilson
