= 1972 Pittsburgh Pirates season =

1972 Pittsburgh Pirates
- National League East champions
- League: National League
- Division: East
- Ballpark: Three Rivers Stadium
- City: Pittsburgh, Pennsylvania
- Record: 96–59 (.619)
- Divisional place: 1st
- Owners: John W. Galbreath (majority shareholder); Bing Crosby, Thomas P. Johnson (minority shareholders)
- General managers: Joe L. Brown
- Managers: Bill Virdon
- Television: KDKA-TV; Bob Prince, Nellie King
- Radio: KDKA; Bob Prince, Nellie King

The 1972 Pittsburgh Pirates season was the 91st season of the Pittsburgh Pirates franchise; the 86th in the National League.

== Background ==
The defending World Series champion Pirates finished first in the National League East with an MLB-best record of 96–59. The team was defeated three games to two by the Cincinnati Reds in the NLCS. Despite losing the series, the Pirates put up a good fight, unlike the last time the two teams met in the playoffs. In Game 5, the Pirates led 3–2 in the ninth inning, and were 3 outs away from pulling off a major upset over the Reds. All looked good until the Pirates collapsed in the 9th inning and allowed 2 runs to score, with the walk-off run coming on a wild pitch.

== Offseason ==
- November, 1971: Danny Murtaugh steps down as Manager of the Pirates citing health reasons. Coach Bill Virdon is named Manager.
- January 12, 1972: Larry Demery was drafted by the Pirates in the 7th round of the 1972 Major League Baseball draft (secondary phase).
- March 15, 1972: José Martínez was purchased from the Pirates by the Kansas City Royals.

== Regular season ==
=== Season standings ===
NL East
Team	W	L	Pct.	GB	Home	Road
Pittsburgh Pirates	96	59	.619	—	49‍–‍29	47‍–‍30
Chicago Cubs	85	70	.548	11	46‍–‍31	39‍–‍39
New York Mets	83	73	.532	13½	41‍–‍37	42‍–‍36
St. Louis Cardinals	75	81	.481	21½	40‍–‍37	35‍–‍44
Montreal Expos	70	86	.449	26½	35‍–‍43	35‍–‍43
Philadelphia Phillies	59	97	.378	37½	28‍–‍51	31‍–‍46

=== Record vs. opponents ===
1972 National League record Sources:
Team	ATL	CHC	CIN	HOU	LAD	MON	NYM	PHI	PIT	SD	SF	STL
Atlanta	—	5–7–1	9–9	7–7	7–8	4–8	7–5	6–6	6–6	6–11	7–11	6–6
Chicago	7–5–1	—	8–4	3–9	8–4	10–5	10–8	10–7	3–12	9–3	7–5	10–8
Cincinnati	9–9	4–8	—	11–6	9–5	8–4	8–4	10–2	8–4	8–10	10–5	10–2
Houston	7–7	9–3	6–11	—	7–11	8–4	6–6	9–3	3–9	12–2	13–5	4–8
Los Angeles	8–7	4–8	5–9	11–7	—	6–6	7–5	7–5	7–5	13–5	9–9	8–4
Montreal	8–4	5–10	4–8	4–8	6–6	—	6–12	10–6	6–12	6–6	6–6	9–8
New York	5–7	8–10	4–8	6–6	5–7	12–6	—	13–5	8–6	7–5	8–4	7–9
Philadelphia	6-6	7–10	2–10	3–9	5–7	6–10	5–13	—	5–13	6–6	6–6	8–7
Pittsburgh	6–6	12–3	4–8	9–3	5–7	12–6	6–8	13–5	—	10–2	9–3	10–8
San Diego	11–6	3–9	10–8	2–12	5–13	6–6	5–7	6–6	2–10	—	4–10	4–8
San Francisco	11–7	5–7	5–10	5–13	9–9	6–6	4–8	6–6	3–9	10–4	—	5–7
St. Louis	6–6	8–10	2–10	8–4	4–8	8–9	9–7	7–8	8–10	8–4	7–5	—

=== Detailed records ===
National League
Opponent	W	L	WP	RS	RA
NL East
Chicago Cubs	12	3	0.800	73	41
Montreal Expos	12	6	0.667	81	39
New York Mets	6	8	0.429	38	38
Philadelphia Phillies	13	5	0.722	73	40
**Pittsburgh Pirates**					
St. Louis Cardinals	10	8	0.556	88	74
Total	53	30	0.639	353	232
NL West
Atlanta Braves	6	6	0.500	60	62
Cincinnati Reds	4	8	0.333	50	58
Houston Astros	9	3	0.750	56	41
Los Angeles Dodgers	5	7	0.417	53	50
San Diego Padres	10	2	0.833	65	26
San Francisco Giants	9	3	0.750	54	43
Total	43	29	0.597	338	280
Season Total	96	59	0.619	691	512

Month	Games	Won	Lost	Win %	RS	RA
April	13	5	8	0.385	51	66
May	26	19	7	0.731	140	79
June	26	16	10	0.615	125	77
July	30	20	10	0.667	121	100
August	28	17	11	0.607	125	102
September	29	18	11	0.621	117	75
October	3	1	2	0.333	12	13
Total	155	96	59	0.619	691	512

	Games	Won	Lost	Win %	RS	RA
Home	78	49	29	0.628	351	259
Away	77	47	30	0.610	340	253
Total	155	96	59	0.619	691	512

=== Game log ===
1972 game log: 96–59 (home: 49–29; Away: 47–30)
April: 5–8 (home: 3–6; Away: 2–2)

#	Date	Opponent	Score	Win	Loss	Save	Attendance	Record
1	April 15	@ Mets	0–4	Seaver	**Ellis** (0–1)	McGraw	15,893	0–1
2	April 16	@ Mets	2–0	**Blass** (1–0)	Gentry	**Hernández** (1)	23,241	1–1
3	April 18	Cubs	4–6	Pappas	**Moose** (0–1)	McGinn	47,489	1–2
4	April 19	Cubs	5–2	**Briles** (1–0)	Pizarro	—	9,171	2–2
5	April 20	Cubs	7–5	**Ellis** (1–1)	Jenkins	**Giusti** (1)	6,529	3–2
6	April 21	@ Phillies	3–2 (10)	**Hernández** (1–0)	Short	—	13,864	4–2
7	April 23	@ Phillies	4–5 (11)	Brandon	**Miller** (0–1)	—	43,438	4–3
8	April 25	Reds	5–2 (13)	**Miller** (1–1)	McGlothlin	—	6,509	5–3
9	April 26	Reds	6–7	Nolan	**Blass** (1–1)	Borbon	6,380	5–4
10	April 27	Reds	4–5	Carroll	**Giusti** (0–1)	—	12,504	5–5
11	April 28	Braves	5–13	Jarvis	**Moose** (0–2)	McQueen	12,804	5–6
12	April 29	Braves	5–9	Kelley	**Walker** (0–1)	Stone	10,684	5–7
13	April 30	Braves	1–6	Niekro	**Johnson** (0–1)	—	12,264	5–8

May: 19–7 (home: 12–2; Away: 7–5)

#	Date	Opponent	Score	Win	Loss	Save	Attendance	Record
14	May 1	Astros	8–9	Ray	**Giusti** (0–2)	—	4,788	5–9
15	May 3	Astros	3–2	**Ellis** (2–1)	Reuss	**Kison** (1)	9,522	6–9
16	May 5	@ Reds	4–5 (10)	Carroll	**Giusti** (0–3)	—	24,722	6–10
17	May 6	@ Reds	8–1	**Blass** (2–1)	Borbon	—	12,284	7–10
18	May 7	@ Reds	9–6	**Briles** (2–0)	Billingham	**Moose** (1)	19,281	8–10
19	May 9	@ Braves	5–2	**Ellis** (3–1)	Kelley	**Kison** (2)	7,762	9–10
20	May 10	@ Braves	4–8	Niekro	**Johnson** (0–2)	—	6,708	9–11
21	May 12	@ Astros	4–2	**Blass** (3–1)	Dierker	**Miller** (1)	17,863	10–11
22	May 13	@ Astros	6–1 (12)	**Moose** (1–2)	Gladding	**Miller** (2)	23,568	11–11
23	May 14	@ Astros	6–7	Wilson	**Briles** (2–1)	Ray	14,704	11–12
24	May 15	Cardinals	4–1	**Ellis** (4–1)	Gibson	—	8,640	12–12
25	May 16	Cardinals	4–3	**Walker** (1–1)	Wise	**Giusti** (2)	8,272	13–12
26	May 17	Cardinals	12–0	**Blass** (4–1)	Cleveland	—	9,188	14–12
27	May 19	Expos	8–0	**Moose** (2–2)	Stoneman	—	41,765	15–12
28	May 20	Expos	6–0	**Ellis** (5–1)	Morton	**Kison** (3)	11,602	16–12
29	May 21	Expos	1–0	**Walker** (2–1)	McAnally	**Hernández** (2)	30,418	17–12
30	May 21	Expos	5–3	**Giusti** (1–3)	Gilbert	—	30,418	18–12
31	May 23	@ Cardinals	6–2	**Blass** (5–1)	Cleveland	**Hernández** (3)	11,795	19–12
32	May 24	@ Cardinals	9–4 (14)	**Miller** (2–1)	Higgins	—	10,794	20–12
33	May 25	@ Cardinals	2–4	Gibson	**Ellis** (5–2)	—	9,293	20–13
34	May 26	Phillies	6–4	**Briles** (3–1)	Carlton	—	25,164	21–13
35	May 27	Phillies	1–2 (12)	Brandon	**Giusti** (1–4)	Short	19,398	21–14
36	May 28	Phillies	6–5	**Hernández** (2–0)	Hoerner	—	15,236	22–14
37	May 29	Phillies	7–3	**Hernández** (3–0)	Fryman	—	36,464	23–14
38	May 29	Phillies	4–2	**Moose** (3–2)	Reynolds	**Giusti** (3)	36,464	24–14
39	May 31	@ Expos	2–3	McAnally	**Briles** (3–2)	—	10,565	24–15

June: 16–10 (home: 5–6; Away: 11–4)

#	Date	Opponent	Score	Win	Loss	Save	Attendance	Record
40	June 2	@ Giants	4–7	Marichal	**Johnson** (0–3)	—	6,669	24–16
41	June 3	@ Giants	4–3	**Blass** (6–1)	McDowell	**Giusti** (4)	11,216	25–16
42	June 4	@ Giants	4–3	**Miller** (3–1)	Johnson	**Giusti** (5)		26–16
43	June 4	@ Giants	9–1	**Kison** (1–0)	Williams	—	19,929	27–16
44	June 7	@ Padres	12–5	**Johnson** (1–3)	Norman	—		28–16
45	June 7	@ Padres	1–0 (18)	**Miller** (4–1)	Corkins	**Johnson** (1)	7,371	29–16
46	June 8	@ Padres	11–2	**Moose** (4–2)	Arlin	—	2,949	30–16
47	June 9	@ Dodgers	5–1	**Blass** (7–1)	Sutton	—	35,078	31–16
48	June 10	@ Dodgers	1–2	Osteen	**Walker** (2–2)	Brewer	38,937	31–17
49	June 11	@ Dodgers	7–5	**Kison** (2–0)	Mikkelsen	**Giusti** (6)	40,846	32–17
50	June 14	Giants	1–3	McDowell	**Ellis** (5–3)	—	14,552	32–18
51	June 15	Giants	4–1	**Briles** (4–2)	Stone	**Giusti** (7)		33–18
52	June 15	Giants	9–7	**Moose** (5–2)	Bryant	**Hernández** (4)	21,126	34–18
53	June 16	Padres	2–1	**Blass** (8–1)	Norman	—	17,020	35–18
54	June 17	Padres	0–4	Kirby	**Walker** (2–3)	—	20,718	35–19
55	June 18	Padres	0–1	Arlin	**Kison** (2–1)	—	27,143	35–20
56	June 19	Dodgers	13–3	**Ellis** (6–3)	Sutton	**Miller** (3)	15,430	36–20
57	June 21	Dodgers	3–5 (10)	Brewer	**Moose** (5–3)	—	15,209	36–21
58	June 23	@ Cubs	4–2	**Blass** (9–1)	Jenkins	**Giusti** (8)	28,177	37–21
59	June 24	@ Cubs	3–1	**Briles** (5–2)	Hands	**Giusti** (9)	27,543	38–21
60	June 25	@ Cubs	9–2	**Ellis** (7–3)	Hooton	**Giusti** (10)	35,099	39–21
61	June 26	@ Mets	2–4	Koosman	**Moose** (5–4)	McGraw	48,820	39–22
62	June 27	@ Mets	4–7	Frisella	**Walker** (2–4)	—	38,152	39–23
63	June 28	Expos	1–3	Stoneman	**Blass** (9–2)	—	13,470	39–24
64	June 29	Expos	9–0	**Briles** (6–2)	McAnally	—	18,364	40–24
65	June 30	Cubs	3–4	Reuschel	**Ellis** (7–4)	Aker	22,745	40–25

July: 20–10 (home: 12–4; Away: 8–6)

#	Date	Opponent	Score	Win	Loss	Save	Attendance	Record
66	July 1	Cubs	4–3	**Giusti** (2–4)	Jenkins	—	16,102	41–25
67	July 2	Cubs	7–4	**Kison** (3–1)	Hands	**Hernández** (5)	25,229	42–25
68	July 3	Cubs	3–2	**Giusti** (3–4)	Hooton	—	26,933	43–25
69	July 4	@ Astros	0–6	Dierker	**Briles** (6–3)	—	31,164	43–26
70	July 5	@ Astros	6–4	**Johnson** (2–3)	Forsch	—	23,646	44–26
71	July 6	@ Astros	7–3 (17)	**Hernández** (4–0)	Ray	—	23,540	45–26
72	July 7	@ Braves	10–2	**Walker** (3–4)	Kelley	—		46–26
73	July 7	@ Braves	2–3	Hardin	**Kison** (3–2)	—	25,253	46–27
74	July 8	@ Braves	5–3	**Blass** (10–2)	Reed	**Giusti** (11)	20,256	47–27
75	July 9	@ Braves	7–4	**Briles** (7–3)	McLain	—	20,130	48–27
76	July 11	@ Reds	0–5	Billingham	**Moose** (5–5)	—	24,047	48–28
77	July 12	@ Reds	3–6	Simpson	**Walker** (3–5)	Carroll	28,058	48–29
78	July 13	@ Reds	0–2	Nolan	**Blass** (10–3)	Carroll	32,060	48–30
79	July 14	Astros	5–2	**Briles** (8–3)	Dierker	—	24,487	49–30
80	July 15	Astros	5–1	**Ellis** (8–4)	Forsch	**Giusti** (12)	16,202	50–30
81	July 16	Astros	3–2 (10)	**Giusti** (4–4)	Gladding	—		51–30
82	July 16	Astros	3–2	**Kison** (4–2)	Wilson	**Giusti** (13)	49,341	52–30
83	July 17	Braves	6–5	**Hernández** (5–0)	Hoerner	**Giusti** (14)	14,866	53–30
84	July 18	Braves	2–4	Reed	**Blass** (10–4)	—	20,162	53–31
85	July 19	Braves	8–3	**Briles** (9–3)	Niekro	**Walker** (1)	24,847	54–31
86	July 21	Reds	5–11	Borbon	**Kison** (4–3)	Gullett	32,255	54–32
87	July 22	Reds	3–6	Sprague	**Moose** (5–6)	Carroll	40,837	54–33
88	July 23	Reds	3–2	**Blass** (11–4)	Grimsley	**Hernández** (6)	29,487	55–33
89	July 27	Mets	0–1 (10)	Matlack	**Briles** (9–4)	—		55–34
90	July 27	Mets	7–5	**Moose** (6–6)	Koosman	**Giusti** (15)	49,886	56–34
91	July 28	Mets	3–1	**Ellis** (9–4)	Seaver	—	39,035	57–34
92	July 29	@ Phillies	2–5	Fryman	**Blass** (11–5)	Selma	37,544	57–35
93	July 29	@ Phillies	3–2	**Walker** (4–5)	Brandon	**Giusti** (16)	37,544	58–35
94	July 30	@ Phillies	7–1	**Kison** (5–3)	Lersch	—	28,451	59–35
95	July 31	@ Phillies	2–0	**Moose** (7–6)	Reynolds	—	17,455	60–35

August: 17–11 (home: 8–5; Away: 9–6)

#	Date	Opponent	Score	Win	Loss	Save	Attendance	Record
96	August 1	@ Cardinals	4–7	Santorini	**Briles** (9–5)	Segui	23,712	60–36
97	August 2	@ Cardinals	5–10 (7)	Gibson	**Ellis** (9–5)	—	24,961	60–37
98	August 3	@ Cardinals	2–1 (10)	**Blass** (12–5)	Wise	**Hernández** (7)	14,836	61–37
99	August 4	@ Expos	1–2	Moore	**Kison** (5–4)	—	18,436	61–38
100	August 5	@ Expos	7–4	**Briles** (10–5)	Stoneman	**Giusti** (17)	20,905	62–38
101	August 6	@ Expos	8–0	**Moose** (8–6)	Torrez	—		63–38
102	August 6	@ Expos	7–2	**Johnson** (3–3)	Renko	**Hernández** (8)	28,330	64–38
103	August 8	Phillies	4–2	**Ellis** (10–5)	Champion	—	18,228	65–38
104	August 9	Phillies	0–2	Carlton	**Blass** (12–6)	—	19,832	65–39
105	August 11	Cardinals	10–5	**Briles** (11–5)	Cleveland	**Hernández** (9)	34,248	66–39
106	August 12	Cardinals	6–5	**Moose** (9–6)	Gibson	**Giusti** (18)	23,474	67–39
107	August 13	Cardinals	0–2	Wise	**Ellis** (10–6)	—		67–40
108	August 13	Cardinals	7–5	**Blass** (13–6)	Santorini	**Giusti** (19)	47,300	68–40
109	August 15	@ Dodgers	6–8	Richert	**Johnson** (3–4)	Brewer	27,484	68–41
110	August 16	@ Dodgers	3–2	**Miller** (5–1)	Sutton	—	28,318	69–41
111	August 17	@ Dodgers	2–4	Downing	**Moose** (9–7)	Richert	29,777	69–42
112	August 18	@ Padres	4–2	**Blass** (14–6)	Greif	—	30,610	70–42
113	August 20	@ Padres	9–3	**Ellis** (11–6)	Corkins	**Johnson** (2)		71–42
114	August 20	@ Padres	5–2	**Kison** (6–4)	Norman	—	9,759	72–42
115	August 22	@ Giants	1–0	**Briles** (12–5)	Marichal	—	9,389	73–42
116	August 23	@ Giants	0–8	Barr	**Moose** (9–8)	—	8,330	73–43
117	August 25	Dodgers	3–2 (12)	**Giusti** (5–4)	Richert	—		74–43
118	August 25	Dodgers	3–4	Osteen	**Kison** (6–5)	—	39,574	74–44
119	August 26	Dodgers	3–7	Sutton	**Ellis** (11–7)	—	20,174	74–45
120	August 27	Dodgers	4–7	Mikkelsen	**Briles** (12–6)	Brewer	25,672	74–46
121	August 28	Padres	5–3	**Moose** (10–8)	Caldwell	**Hernández** (10)	13,438	75–46
122	August 29	Padres	5–3	**Blass** (15–6)	Corkins	**Giusti** (20)	12,329	76–46
123	August 30	Padres	11–0	**Kison** (7–5)	Arlin	—	19,009	77–46

September: 18–11 (home: 8–4; Away: 10–7)

#	Date	Opponent	Score	Win	Loss	Save	Attendance	Record
124	September 1	Giants	10–6	**Ellis** (12–7)	Bryant	**Giusti** (21)	20,678	78–46
125	September 2	Giants	6–3	**Briles** (13–6)	McDowell	—	14,194	79–46
126	September 3	Giants	2–1 (10)	**Giusti** (6–4)	Johnson	—	16,760	80–46
127	September 4	Phillies	10–0	**Blass** (16–6)	Twitchell	—	26,627	81–46
128	September 4	Phillies	5–1	**Kison** (8–5)	Nash	—	26,627	82–46
129	September 6	Cubs	4–0	**Ellis** (13–7)	McGinn	—	12,470	83–46
130	September 7	Cubs	2–4	Hooton	**Briles** (13–7)	—	12,306	83–47
131	September 8	@ Expos	7–1	**Johnson** (4–4)	Morton	—		84–47
132	September 8	@ Expos	4–2 (12)	**Giusti** (7–4)	Marshall	**Hernández** (11)	12,118	85–47
133	September 9	@ Expos	8–3	**Blass** (17–6)	Stoneman	—	17,092	86–47
134	September 10	@ Expos	2–8	Torrez	**Kison** (8–6)	—	20,253	86–48
135	September 12	@ Cubs	7–0	**Ellis** (14–7)	Hooton	**Giusti** (22)	4,153	87–48
136	September 13	@ Cubs	6–4	**Briles** (14–7)	Jenkins	**Hernández** (12)	4,418	88–48
137	September 14	@ Cubs	5–2	**Moose** (11–8)	Reuschel	**Hernández** (13)	4,603	89–48
138	September 15	@ Cardinals	4–10	Wise	**Kison** (8–7)	—	10,853	89–49
139	September 16	@ Cardinals	0–4	Santorini	**Blass** (17–7)	—	11,850	89–50
140	September 17	@ Cardinals	4–5	Cleveland	**Miller** (5–2)	Segui	11,802	89–51
141	September 18	@ Mets	0–1	Matlack	**Briles** (14–8)	—	15,622	89–52
142	September 19	@ Mets	5–1	**Moose** (12–8)	Koosman	—	15,537	90–52
143	September 20	@ Mets	1–4	Seaver	**Walker** (4–6)	—	15,147	90–53
144	September 21	@ Mets	6–2	**Blass** (18–7)	Gentry	—	10,991	91–53
145	September 22	Expos	4–3 (12)	**McKee** (1–0)	Marshall	—	15,365	92–53
146	September 23	Expos	0–3	McAnally	**Briles** (14–9)	—	8,580	92–54
147	September 24	Expos	1–2	Morton	**Moose** (12–9)	—	9,116	92–55
148	September 26	@ Phillies	5–1	**Blass** (19–7)	Champion	—	8,472	93–55
149	September 27	@ Phillies	3–1	**Kison** (9–7)	Reynolds	**Walker** (2)	5,335	94–55
150	September 28	@ Phillies	1–2	Carlton	**Moose** (12–10)	—	12,216	94–56
151	September 29	Mets	0–1	Seaver	**Briles** (14–10)	—	24,193	94–57
152	September 30	Mets	5–0	**Ellis** (15–7)	Matlack	**Johnson** (3)	13,117	95–57

October: 1–2 (home: 1–2; Away: 0–0)

#	Date	Opponent	Score	Win	Loss	Save	Attendance	Record
153	October 1	Mets	3–7	Koosman	**Blass** (19–8)	—	30,031	95–58
154	October 3	Cardinals	6–2	**Moose** (13–10)	Santorini	**Hernández** (14)	5,905	96–58
155	October 4	Cardinals	3–4	Gibson	**Briles** (14–11)	—	4,603	96–59

Legend: = Win = Loss
Bold = Pirates team member

=== Opening Day lineup ===
Opening Day Starters
#	Name	Position
6	Rennie Stennett	2B
16	Al Oliver	CF
21	Roberto Clemente	RF
8	Willie Stargell	LF
3	Richie Hebner	3B
35	Manny Sanguillén	C
7	Bob Robertson	1B
2	Jackie Hernández	SS
17	Dock Ellis	SP

=== Notable transactions ===
- June 6, 1972: 1972 Major League Baseball draft
  - John Candelaria was drafted by the Pirates in the 2nd round.
  - Ken Macha was drafted by the Pirates in the 6th round.
  - Willie Randolph was drafted by the Pirates in the 7th round.
- September 2, 1972 Bob Veale was sold by the Pirates to the Boston Red Sox.

=== Roster ===
1972 Pittsburgh Pirates
**Roster**
**Pitchers**: 28 Steve Blass; 34 Nelson Briles; 17 Dock Ellis; 12 Gene Garber; 31 Dave Giusti; 36 Ramón Hernández; 27 Bob Johnson; 25 Bruce Kison; 39 Jim McKee; 32 Bob Miller; 38 Bob Moose; 39 Bob Veale; 23 Luke Walker	**Catchers**: 29 Milt May; 35 Manny Sanguillén; **Infielders**: 14 Gene Alley; 30 Dave Cash; 12 Chuck Goggin; 37 Fernando González; 3 Richie Hebner; 2 Jackie Hernández; 9 Bill Mazeroski; 11 José Pagán; 7 Bob Robertson; 8 Willie Stargell; 6 Rennie Stennett; 10 Frank Taveras	**Outfielders**: 21 Roberto Clemente; 15 Gene Clines; 18 Vic Davalillo; 16 Al Oliver; 22 Richie Zisk; **Other batters**: 4 Charlie Sands	**Manager**: 41 Bill Virdon; **Coaches**: 43 Don Leppert (First Base); 45 Joe Morgan (Hitting); 44 Frank Oceak (Third Base); 42 Don Osborn (Pitching); 5 Dave Ricketts (Bullpen)

== Player stats ==
=== Batting ===
==== Starters by position ====
Note: Pos = Position; G = Games played; AB = At bats; H = Hits; Avg. = Batting average; HR = Home runs; RBI = Runs batted in

Pos	Player	G	AB	H	Avg.	HR	RBI
C	Manny Sanguillén	136	520	155	.298	7	71
1B	Willie Stargell	138	495	145	.293	33	112
2B	Dave Cash	99	425	120	.282	3	30
SS	Gene Alley	119	347	86	.248	3	36
3B	Richie Hebner	124	427	128	.300	19	72
LF	Vic Davalillo	117	368	117	.318	4	28
CF	Al Oliver	140	565	176	.312	12	89
RF	Roberto Clemente	102	378	118	.312	10	60

==== Other batters ====
Note: G = Games played; AB = At bats; H = Hits; Avg. = Batting average; HR = Home runs; RBI = Runs batted in

Player	G	AB	H	Avg.	HR	RBI
Rennie Stennett	109	370	106	.286	3	30
Gene Clines	107	311	104	.334	0	17
Bob Robertson	115	306	59	.193	12	41
Jackie Hernández	72	176	33	.188	1	14
Milt May	57	139	39	.281	0	14
José Pagán	53	127	32	.252	3	8
Bill Mazeroski	34	64	12	.188	0	3
Richie Zisk	17	37	7	.189	0	4
Chuck Goggin	5	7	2	.286	0	0
Frank Taveras	4	3	0	.000	0	0
Fernando González	3	2	0	.000	0	0
Charlie Sands	1	1	0	.000	0	0

=== Pitching ===
==== Starting pitchers ====
Note: G = Games pitched; IP = Innings pitched; W = Wins; L = Losses; ERA = Earned run average; SO = Strikeouts

Player	G	IP	W	L	ERA	SO
Steve Blass	33	249.2	19	8	2.49	117
Bob Moose	31	226.0	13	10	2.91	144
Nelson Briles	28	195.2	14	11	3.08	120
Dock Ellis	25	163.1	15	7	2.70	96
Bruce Kison	32	152.0	9	7	3.26	102

==== Other pitchers ====
Note: G = Games pitched; IP = Innings pitched; W = Wins; L = Losses; ERA = Earned run average; SO = Strikeouts

Player	G	IP	W	L	ERA	SO
Bob Johnson	31	115.2	4	4	2.96	79
Luke Walker	26	92.2	4	6	3.40	48
Bob Veale	5	9.0	0	0	6.00	6
Gene Garber	4	6.1	0	0	7.11	3
Jim McKee	2	5.0	1	0	0.00	4

==== Relief pitchers ====
Note: G = Games pitched; W = Wins; L = Losses; SV = Saves; ERA = Earned run average; SO = Strikeouts

Player	G	W	L	SV	ERA	SO
Dave Giusti	54	7	4	22	1.93	54
Ramón Hernández	53	5	0	14	1.67	47
Bob Miller	36	5	2	3	2.65	18

== Awards and honors ==
1972 Major League Baseball All-Star Game

== Farm system ==
Level	Team	League	Manager
AAA	Charleston Charlies	International League	Red Davis
AA	Sherbrooke Pirates	Eastern League	Steve Demeter
A	Salem Pirates	Carolina League	Tim Murtaugh
A	Gastonia Pirates	Western Carolinas League	Tom Saffell
A-Short Season	Niagara Falls Pirates	New York–Penn League	Chuck Cottier
Rookie	GCL Pirates	Gulf Coast League	Ed Napoleon

LEAGUE CHAMPIONS: Salem, Niagara Falls
