= Paul Owens (baseball) =

American baseball player, executive, and manager (1924–2003)

- General manager / Manager
- Born: February 7, 1924; Salamanca, New York, U.S.
- Died: December 26, 2003 (aged 79); Woodbury, New Jersey, U.S.
- Batted: Right Threw: Right

MLB statistics
- Games managed: 319
- Win–loss record: 161–158
- Winning %: .505
- Stats at Baseball Reference
- Managerial record at Baseball Reference

Teams
- As general manager: Philadelphia Phillies (1972–1984); As manager: Philadelphia Phillies (1972, 1983–1984)

Career highlights and awards
- World Series champion (1980); Philadelphia Phillies Wall of Fame

Paul Francis Owens (February 7, 1924 – December 26, 2003), nicknamed "the Pope", was an American Major League Baseball (MLB) front office executive, manager, and scout. Earlier, during his playing career, Owens was a first baseman and catcher, and then a manager, in minor league baseball.

Owens' entire Major League career was spent with the Philadelphia Phillies. He was the general manager and principal architect of the 1980 Phillies, who won the third National League (NL) pennant and became the first World Series champion in franchise history — breaking a 97-year streak of futility dating to the team's founding in 1883. Owens was general manager of the Phillies from June 3, 1972, through the end of 1984, and twice (1972; 1983–1984) added the title of field manager to his job description.

In 1983, he took the managerial reins of the Phillies in mid-season and led them to their fourth pennant, but lost to the Baltimore Orioles in the 1983 World Series. After his tenure as manager ended the following year, he remained with the team as an advisor and scout for the rest of his life.

== Background ==
Nicknamed "the Pope" because of his resemblance to Pope Paul VI, Owens was born in Salamanca, New York, and attended St. Bonaventure University. He served in the United States Army as a sergeant during World War II. Prior to 1951, Owens spent several years in the semiprofessional ranks with the Salamanca Merchants in what was then the Suburban League, the local Town Team Baseball circuit.

Owens and his wife, Marcelle, had two children.

== Playing career ==
Owens' professional playing career began in 1951 at the relatively advanced age of 27. He played exclusively at the lower ends of the minor leagues, with his active career largely centered in his native western New York. A first baseman who batted and threw right-handed, he twice (1951 and 1957) batted .407 with the Olean Oilers of the Class D PONY League (later called the New York–Penn League) and set a league record by hitting safely in 38 consecutive games in 1951. During his relatively brief playing career, Owens compiled a lifetime average of .374.

== Managerial and front office career ==
In 1955, Owens was named Olean's playing manager; the following year, the Oilers became a Phillies' affiliate and Owens moved into their organization. In 1958 and 1959, he managed Class C Bakersfield of the California League. In 1960 he became a scout, and, in 1966, director of the entire Philadelphia farm system. On June 3, 1972, he replaced John Quinn as the Phillies' general manager. Then, five weeks later, on July 10, Owens fired manager Frank Lucchesi and assumed that job as well, to get a closer (if temporary) look at the last-place Phillies' on-field struggles. He guided the Phillies to a 33–47 record for the remainder of the 1972 campaign.

After relinquishing managerial duties to Danny Ozark on November 7, 1972, he then returned to the front office and proceeded to turn the Phils into pennant contenders within three seasons. His farm system, one of the most productive in the game at the time, bore fruit—yielding players such as Mike Schmidt, Greg Luzinski, Bob Boone, Larry Bowa and Dick Ruthven. In addition, Owens aggressively swung trades to add missing pieces such as relief pitcher Tug McGraw and outfielders Garry Maddox and Bake McBride. The Phils won the NL East in 1976–1977–1978—each time falling short in the National League Championship Series.

Owens thought he added the final piece in 1979 when he signed free agent Pete Rose, but the Phils stumbled and finished fourth. In 1980, under manager Dallas Green, the Phillies beat Houston in an intense NLCS and then defeated the Kansas City Royals for the team's first world championship.

Owens assumed the managerial role for a second time on July 18, 1983 after firing Pat Corrales despite the Phillies having a 43–42 record and being tied for first place with the St. Louis Cardinals in the National League East. The Owens-led ballclub went from one game over .500 to 47 wins in its last 77 matches to clinch the division title. They then defeated the Los Angeles Dodgers in four games in the NLCS to win the Phillies' fourth pennant. During the World Series, the Phils lost to Baltimore in five games.

Owens returned to managing in 1984, but the results were disappointing. The Phillies played only .500 ball and finished fourth, 15½ games behind the division champ Chicago Cubs.

Owens was relieved of both his GM and managing jobs during the off-season, but remained with the Phillies as a senior advisor and special scout until his death on December 26, 2003, aged 79, at a hospital in Woodbury, New Jersey. For the 2004 season, the Phillies wore a patch on their right shoulder featuring a banner reading "Pope" in honor of Owens, and a shamrock in honor of former relief pitcher McGraw, who had also died that winter.

Owens's career managing record was 161–158 (.505).

== Managerial record ==
=== Record as manager ===
Team	Year	Regular season					Postseason			
Team	Year	Games	Won	Lost	Win %	Finish	Won	Lost	Win %	Result
PHI	1972	80	33	47	.413	6th in NL East	—	—	—	—
PHI	1983	77	47	30	.610	1st in NL East	4	5	.444	Lost World Series (BAL)
PHI	1984	162	81	81	.500	4th in NL East	–	–	–	–
Total		319	161	158	.505		4	5	.444	

=== Record as general manager ===
Team	Year	Regular season					Postseason			
Team	Year	Games	Won	Lost	Win %	Finish	Won	Lost	Win %	Result
PHI	1972	113	43	70	.381	6th in NL East	—	—	—	—
PHI	1973	162	71	91	.438	6th in NL East	—	—	—	—
PHI	1974	162	80	82	.494	3rd in NL East	–	–	–	–
PHI	1975	162	86	76	.531	2nd in NL East	–	–	–	–
PHI	1976	162	101	61	.623	1st in NL East	0	3	.000	Lost NLCS (CIN)
PHI	1977	162	101	61	.623	1st in NL East	1	3	.250	Lost NLCS (LAD)
PHI	1978	162	90	72	.556	1st in NL East	1	3	.250	Lost NLCS (LAD)
PHI	1979	163	84	78	.519	4th in NL East	–	–	–	–
PHI	1980	162	91	71	.562	1st in NL East	7	4	.636	Won World Series (KC)
TOR	1981	55	34	21	.618	1st in NL East	2	3	.400	Lost NLDS (MTL)
TOR	1981	52	25	27	.481	3rd in NL East	2	3	.400	Lost NLDS (MTL)
PHI	1982	162	89	73	.549	2nd in NL East	–	–	–	–
PHI	1983	163	90	72	.556	1st in NL East	4	5	.444	Lost World Series (BAL)
PHI	1984	162	81	81	.500	4th in NL East	–	–	–	–
Total		2,004	1,066	936	.532		15	21	.417	

== Honors ==
- Starting in 1986, the Phillies established the annual Paul Owens Award. This award is given each season to both the top pitcher and the top position player within the Phillies' minor-league system. In 1988, Owens was elected to the Philadelphia Baseball Wall of Fame (the first non-Phillies player elected and enshrined). A plaque bearing his likeness is displayed in Ashburn Alley at Citizens Bank Park.

== Footnotes ==
Sporting positions
Preceded by John Quinn	Philadelphia Phillies General Manager; 1972–1984	Succeeded by Bill Giles
