= Gulf Coast League Red Birds =

- (1972-1973); Sarasota, Florida

Minor league affiliations
- Previous classes: Rookie
- Previous leagues: Gulf Coast League

Major league affiliations
- Previous teams: St. Louis Cardinals

Team data
- Name: GCL Red Birds

The Gulf Coast League Red Birds were a minor league baseball team, that played in Sarasota, Florida. The GCL Red Birds were a second team established in the Gulf Coast League as an affiliate of the St. Louis Cardinals, from 1972-1973. The club played alongside the Cardinals' other affiliate, the Gulf Coast Cardinals. A frequent designated hitter for the Red Birds was Randy Poffo, who would become famous as wrestler Randy "Macho Man" Savage.

== Season-by-season ==
Year	Record	Finish	Manager	Playoffs
1972	23-35	6th	Julio Gotay	
1973	29-27	4th	Lee Thomas	
