= Joe Gilbert (baseball) =

American baseball player (born 1952)

- Pitcher
- Born: April 20, 1952 (age 74); Jasper, Texas, U.S.
- Batted: Right Threw: Left

MLB debut
- April 30, 1972, for the Montreal Expos

Last MLB appearance
- July 15, 1973, for the Montreal Expos

MLB statistics
- Win–loss record: 1–3
- Earned run average: 6.82
- Strikeouts: 42
- Stats at Baseball Reference

Teams
- Montreal Expos (1972–1973)

Joe Dennis Gilbert (born April 20, 1952) is an American former Major League Baseball (MLB) pitcher. Gilbert played for the Montreal Expos in 1972 and 1973. Gilbert retired with one win and one save at the MLB level, both coming in 1973. His lone win in relief and it came on July 4, 1973 against the New York Mets. Hall of Famer Tom Seaver got a no decision as the starting pitcher that day for the Mets. His one save came on May 5, 1973. Gilbert pitched the 9th inning to nail down a 8-6 Expos victory over the Cincinnati Reds.
