= Ron Allen (baseball) =

American baseball player (born 1943)

- First baseman
- Born: December 23, 1943 (age 82); Wampum, Pennsylvania, U.S.
- Batted: Switch Threw: Right

MLB debut
- August 11, 1972, for the St. Louis Cardinals

Last MLB appearance
- August 21, 1972, for the St. Louis Cardinals

MLB statistics
- Batting average: .091
- Home runs: 1
- Runs batted in: 1
- Stats at Baseball Reference

Teams
- St. Louis Cardinals (1972)

Ronald Frederick Allen (born December 23, 1943) is an American former professional baseball player. He played part of the 1972 season in Major League Baseball for the St. Louis Cardinals, primarily as a first baseman. He was a switch-hitter and threw right-handed.

== Early life ==
Allen starred at Wampum High School alongside his older brothers, future baseball All-Star and Hall of Fame member Dick Allen and outfielder–infielder Hank Allen. Ron Allen scored 1,195 career points as a star forward and center for Wampum High School's basketball team; Wampum captured the 1958 and 1960 state championships in basketball.

Allen was named the section 20 MVP his senior year at Wampum, an honor that was shared by all of his brothers, Coy Craine Allen, Caesar Craine, Harold Allen, and Dick Allen, during their playing days under coach Butler Hennon.

Allen went on to attend Youngstown State University on a basketball scholarship, scoring 1,001 career points, and also ranks in the top 25 in career rebounds. He is a member of the YSU Hall of Fame.

== Professional career ==
=== Minor leagues ===
Originally signed by the Philadelphia Phillies on June 13, 1964, Allen began his professional career with the Miami Marlins of the Florida State League. He led the Carolina League with 100 RBI while playing for the Tidewater Tides in 1967. Prior to the 1970 season, he was traded to the New York Mets for a player to be named later. He was acquired by the Cardinals before the 1972 season.

=== Major leagues ===
Allen's major league career was very short as he played in just seven games in 1972 for the St. Louis Cardinals. He made his major league debut on August 11, 1972, and his final appearance on August 21, 1972. In five games at first base, Allen handled 30 out of 31 chances successfully for a .968 fielding percentage.

Allen's best day as a major leaguer was on August 17, 1972 at San Diego Stadium, due in part to teammate Joe Torre. Torre was ejected from the game in the bottom of the eighth inning, and Allen came in as his replacement at first base. The next inning, he got his only major league hit, a home run against San Diego Padres right-hander Mike Corkins.

== Later life and legacy ==
Allen received his B.S. in General Studies on August 14, 2010 from Youngstown State University. He graduated 46 years and 195 days after scoring his last point for the Penguins, fulfilling a promise made to his mother to earn his college degree.

As of October 2006, with 358 home runs among them, the Allen brothers ranked # 11 in MLB brother combination home runs (out of more than 350 combinations all-time). Allen has also been inducted to the Reading Phillies Hall of Fame.
