= Bob Terlecki =

American baseball player (born 1945)

- Pitcher
- Born: February 14, 1945 (age 80); Trenton, New Jersey
- Batted: Right Threw: Right

MLB debut
- August 16, 1972, for the Philadelphia Phillies

Last MLB appearance
- October 1, 1972, for the Philadelphia Phillies

MLB statistics
- Games pitched: 9
- Win–loss record: 0–0
- Earned run average: 4.73
- Strikeouts: 5
- Stats at Baseball Reference

Teams
- Philadelphia Phillies (1972)

Robert Joseph Terlecki (born February 14, 1945) is a former Major League Baseball player. Terlecki pitched in 9 games for the Philadelphia Phillies in the 1972 season. He had a 0–0 record in 13 1/3 innings, with a 4.73 ERA.

Terlecki attended Notre Dame High School and was signed by the Chicago Cubs as an amateur free agent in 1964.
