= Ernie McAnally =

American baseball player (born 1946)

- Pitcher
- Born: August 15, 1946 (age 79); Pittsburg, Texas, U.S.
- Batted: Right Threw: Right

MLB debut
- April 11, 1971, for the Montreal Expos

Last MLB appearance
- September 10, 1974, for the Montreal Expos

MLB statistics
- Win–loss record: 30–49
- Earned run average: 4.03
- Strikeouts: 351
- Stats at Baseball Reference

Teams
- Montreal Expos (1971–1974)

Ernest Lee McAnally (born August 15, 1946) is an American former professional baseball player. A right-handed pitcher, McAnally spent four seasons (1971–1974) in Major League Baseball as a member of the Montreal Expos.

McAnally stood 6 feet 1 inch (1.85 m) tall and weighed 190 pounds (86 kg) as an active player. Originally drafted and signed by the New York Mets, McAnally played for one season in the Met farm system at the Class A level before Montreal selected him in the 1968 Major League Baseball expansion draft.

McAnally made the Major Leagues during the 1971 season and it proved to be his finest. He reached career highs in victories (11), innings pitched (177 2/3), and complete games (8). After a slow start (1–7) which caused him to be farmed out briefly, and, possibly inspired by the Ernie McAnally Fan Club, he returned from the minors to become one of the best pitchers in the NL during the second half. All told he won 30 of 79 decisions (.380) in 112 career MLB games, with 351 strikeouts.

Sent to the Cleveland Indians after the 1974 season, he returned to the minor leagues for one year before leaving the game.
