= Jim Nash (baseball) =

American baseball player (born 1945)

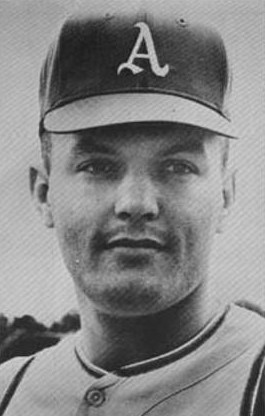
- Pitcher
- Born: February 9, 1945 (age 81); Hawthorne, Nevada, U.S.
- Batted: Right Threw: Right

MLB debut
- July 3, 1966, for the Kansas City Athletics

Last MLB appearance
- September 30, 1972, for the Philadelphia Phillies

MLB statistics
- Win–loss record: 68–64
- Earned run average: 3.58
- Strikeouts: 771
- Stats at Baseball Reference

Teams
- Kansas City / Oakland Athletics (1966–1969); Atlanta Braves (1970–1972); Philadelphia Phillies (1972)

James Edwin Nash (born February 9, 1945), commonly known as Jim Nash, is an American former professional baseball pitcher. He debuted on July 3, 1966 against the Detroit Tigers after then Kansas City Athletics signed him as a free agent. During his rookie season in 1966 he went 12–1 with a 2.06 earned run average in 127 innings pitched as part of the kiddie corps of pitchers featured in Kansas City. He also received the only two votes not won by Tommie Agee for the American League Rookie of the Year Award. Nash would appear on the cover of the March 13, 1967 Sports Illustrated, and was featured in a story along with up and coming pitchers Catfish Hunter and Blue Moon Odom. Nash however failed to live up to the hype from his first two seasons, battling shoulder soreness, and ended with a career record of 68 wins and 64 losses with a lifetime ERA of 3.58, allowing 1,050 hits and 441 earned runs in 1,107.1 innings pitched. He went on to play 4 seasons for the Athletics and 3 seasons for the Atlanta Braves, playing his final season with the Philadelphia Phillies in 1972.
