= Gary Neibauer =

American baseball player (born 1944)

- Pitcher
- Born: October 29, 1944 (age 81); Billings, Montana, U.S.
- Batted: Right Threw: Right

MLB debut
- April 12, 1969, for the Atlanta Braves

Last MLB appearance
- September 30, 1973, for the Atlanta Braves

MLB statistics
- Win–loss record: 4–8
- Earned run average: 4.78
- Strikeouts: 81
- Stats at Baseball Reference

Teams
- Atlanta Braves (1969–1972); Philadelphia Phillies (1972); Atlanta Braves (1973)

Gary Wayne Neibauer (born October 29, 1944) is an American former Major League Baseball pitcher who played for the Atlanta Braves and Philadelphia Phillies from 1969–1973. Appearing primarily as a relief pitcher, Neibauer went 4–8 during his Major League career with a 4.78 earned run average (ERA).

Born and raised in Billings, Montana, Neibauer eventually relocated to Nebraska, along with his family. He received scholarship offers to play college football at Stanford, Wyoming, Nebraska and other Big Eight schools. Neibauer went to Nebraska and played on both the Cornhuskers' baseball and basketball teams.

Neibauer was drafted in both the regular and secondary phases of the 1966 Major League Baseball draft by the Cleveland Indians and Braves, respectively, and he signed with Atlanta after failing to sign a contract with Cleveland. In 1966 and 1967, he pitched for the Austin Braves of the Texas League, before gaining a promotion to the International League's Richmond Braves in the latter year. The Braves promoted Neibauer again in 1969, this time to the Major Leagues; he made his first career appearance on April 12 in a game against the Cincinnati Reds. In his first Major League season, Neibauer pitched in 29 games and had a 1–2 win–loss record and 3.90 ERA in 57 2/3 innings pitched. In addition, he pitched one inning in Game 2 during the 1969 National League Championship Series, allowing no hits or runs.

After 21 more appearances over the next three seasons, the Braves traded him to the Phillies as part of a four-player deal; he pitched nine times for Philadelphia before his release in June 1973. Atlanta signed him, and in his last Major League season he posted a 2–1 record and 7.17 ERA in 17 games. Neibauer spent the 1974 season with Richmond, winning seven of ten decisions and recording a 4.26 ERA. Following his playing career, Neibauer became a mortgage broker, after a stint as a Texas Rangers scout. He later joined a committee of the Major League Baseball Players Alumni Association, helping to increase the number of former players who receive pensions.
