= Don Durham =

American baseball player (born 1949)

- Pitcher
- Born: March 21, 1949 (age 77); Yosemite, Kentucky, U.S.
- Batted: Right Threw: Right

MLB debut
- July 16, 1972, for the St. Louis Cardinals

Last MLB appearance
- September 29, 1973, for the Texas Rangers

MLB statistics
- Win–loss record: 2–11
- Earned run average: 5.83
- Strikeouts: 58
- Stats at Baseball Reference

Teams
- St. Louis Cardinals (1972); Texas Rangers (1973)

Donald Gary Durham (born March 21, 1949) is an American former pitcher in Major League Baseball. He played for the St. Louis Cardinals and Texas Rangers.

Born in Yosemite, Kentucky, Durham attended Western Kentucky University and was drafted by the St. Louis Cardinals in the 7th round of the 1970 MLB draft.

Durham holds the MLB record for most at-bats for a player who hit .500 or better in a career as he collected 7 hits in 14 career at-bats for an even .500 batting average.

After his baseball career ended, Durham worked as president of an auto body shop in Nashville. He established the Don Durham Baseball Scholarship Fund to serve Western Kentucky Hilltoppers baseball players.
