= Joe Hoerner =

American baseball player (1936–1996)

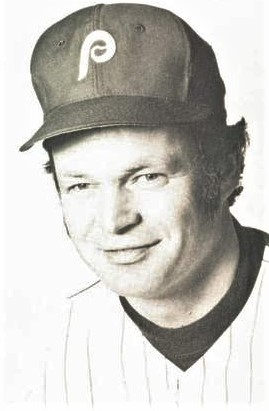
- Pitcher
- Born: November 12, 1936; Dubuque, Iowa, U.S.
- Died: October 4, 1996 (aged 59); Hermann, Missouri, U.S.
- Batted: Right Threw: Left

MLB debut
- September 27, 1963, for the Houston Colt .45s

Last MLB appearance
- August 5, 1977, for the Cincinnati Reds

MLB statistics
- Win–loss record: 39–34
- Earned run average: 2.99
- Strikeouts: 412
- Saves: 99
- Stats at Baseball Reference

Teams
- Houston Colt .45s (1963–1964); St. Louis Cardinals (1966–1969); Philadelphia Phillies (1970–1972); Atlanta Braves (1972–1973); Kansas City Royals (1973–1974); Philadelphia Phillies (1975); Texas Rangers (1976); Cincinnati Reds (1977)

Career highlights and awards
- All-Star (1970); World Series champion (1967)

Joseph Walter Hoerner (November 12, 1936 – October 4, 1996) was an American professional baseball relief pitcher, who played 14 years in Major League Baseball (MLB), for seven different teams.

A native of Dubuque, Iowa, he grew up in nearby Key West and attended Dubuque High School.

The left-handed hurler was signed by the Chicago White Sox as an amateur free agent before the 1957 season. At the MLB level, Hoerner played for the Houston Colt .45s (1963–1964), St. Louis Cardinals (1966–1969), Philadelphia Phillies (1970–72, 1975), Atlanta Braves (1972–1973), Kansas City Royals (1973–1974), Texas Rangers (1976), and Cincinnati Reds (1977).

Hoerner was used exclusively in relief during his 14-year big league career. He appeared in 493 games, and during his first six full seasons (1966–1971) had one of the lowest combined ERAs among all major league relief pitchers (2.16).

Hoerner was drafted by the Colt .45's from the White Sox in the 1961 minor league draft. He made his major league debut on September 27, 1963, against the New York Mets at Colt Stadium. In this particular game, Houston manager Harry Craft used a starting lineup of nine rookies, including Jerry Grote (20), Joe Morgan (20), Rusty Staub (19), and Jimmy Wynn (21). Hoerner pitched three scoreless innings as the Mets won, 10–3.

Hoerner was drafted by the Cardinals from the Houston Astros in the 1965 rule V draft, and this led to him being part of two pennant-winning teams, including the 1967 World Series champions. In Game 3 of the 1968 World Series he became the first player in MLB history to get a hit in a World Series without having collected a hit in the regular season. In four seasons with St. Louis (1966–1969) Hoerner pitched in 206 games with a 19–10 record and 60 saves. He ranked in the National League top ten all four seasons for saves, and three times for games finished. On July 22, 1966 at Wrigley Field he hit his only major league home run, a three-run shot, against Hall of Famer Ferguson Jenkins. During this time, he also tied a National League record for relievers with six consecutive strikeouts vs. the Mets on June 1, 1968. He also appeared in five World Series games for the Cards, with a 0–1 record and one save.

Hoerner was traded to Philadelphia as part of the Curt Flood deal on October 7, 1969. He made the National League All-Star team in 1970, and his .643 winning percentage ranked sixth in the league. During 1971 that year he gave up Willie Mays' major league-leading 22nd and last career extra-inning home run at Candlestick Park. In 1971, at age 34, he finished the year with a 1.97 ERA, and his effectiveness declined after that season. However, he later gave up Willie McCovey's N.L. record-breaking 17th grand slam in 1977 at Riverfront Stadium. His final major league appearance was on August 5, 1977. At the age of 40, he was the second-oldest player to appear in a National League game that season.

For his career he finished with a lifetime record of 39–34, 98 saves, 268 games finished, and an earned run average of 2.99. He struck out 412 and walked 181 In 562.2 innings pitched. Hoerner held All-Stars Bobby Bonds, Johnny Callison, Tommy Harper, Ed Kranepool, Joe Pepitone, and Bill White to a .070 collective batting average (5-for-71). He also held Hall of Famers Hank Aaron, Ernie Banks, Reggie Jackson, Willie Mays, Bill Mazeroski, Tony Pérez, Willie Stargell, and Carl Yastrzemski to a .101 collective batting average (9-for-89).

In 1985, Hoerner was acquitted of reckless and negligent operation of a motorboat, charges stemming from a collision on the Lake of the Ozarks that killed two 25-year-old boaters.

Hoerner died in a farming accident at the age of 59 in Hermann, Missouri.
