= 1972 Major League Baseball All-Star Game =

1972 American baseball competition

	1	2	3	4	5	6	7	8	9	10	R	H	E
American League	0	0	1	0	0	0	0	2	0	0	3	6	0
National League	0	0	0	0	0	2	0	0	1	1	4	8	0
- Date: July 25, 1972
- Venue: Atlanta Stadium
- City: Atlanta
- Managers: Earl Weaver (BAL); Danny Murtaugh (PIT)
- MVP: Joe Morgan (CIN)
- Attendance: 53,107
- Television: NBC
- TV announcers: Curt Gowdy and Tony Kubek
- Radio: NBC
- Radio announcers: Jim Simpson and Sandy Koufax

The 1972 Major League Baseball All-Star Game, the 43rd such game, was played on July 25, 1972. The all-stars from the American League and the National League faced each other at Atlanta Stadium, home of the Atlanta Braves. The National League came away with a 4–3 win in 10 innings.

This was the third All-Star Game hosted by the Braves (1936 and 1955), but the first All-Star Game to be hosted by the team in Atlanta (the previous two being hosted in their previous homes of Boston and Milwaukee, respectively). This would be the only All-Star Game played in Atlanta Stadium, as the Braves had moved to Turner Field when the exhibition returned to Atlanta in 2000.

After seeing their 8 All-Star Game winning streak ended in 1971, the game would mark the start of an 11-game winning streak for the NL, the longest winning streak by either league in the exhibition's history. This was also the final All-Star Game for Roberto Clemente before his death in a plane crash on New Year's Eve.

== American League roster ==
The American League roster included 14 future Hall of Fame players and coaches, denoted in italics.

=== Elected starters ===
Position	Player	Team	Notes
C	Bill Freehan	Detroit Tigers
1B	Dick Allen	Chicago White Sox
2B	Rod Carew	Minnesota Twins
3B	Brooks Robinson	Baltimore Orioles
SS	Luis Aparicio	Boston Red Sox	injured
OF	Reggie Jackson	Oakland Athletics
OF	Bobby Murcer	New York Yankees
OF	Carl Yastrzemski	Boston Red Sox

=== Pitchers ===
Throws	Pitcher	Team	Notes
RH	Joe Coleman	Detroit Tigers	injured
RH	Pat Dobson	Baltimore Orioles	did not pitch
LH	Ken Holtzman	Oakland Athletics	did not pitch
RH	Catfish Hunter	Oakland Athletics	did not pitch
LH	Mickey Lolich	Detroit Tigers
LH	Dave McNally	Baltimore Orioles
RH	Jim Palmer	Baltimore Orioles	starting pitcher
RH	Gaylord Perry	Cleveland Indians
RH	Nolan Ryan	California Angels	did not pitch
LH	Wilbur Wood	Chicago White Sox

=== Reserve position players ===
Position	Player	Team	Notes
C	Carlton Fisk	Boston Red Sox
C	Ellie Rodríguez	Milwaukee Brewers	did not play
1B	Norm Cash	Detroit Tigers
2B	Cookie Rojas	Kansas City Royals
3B	Sal Bando	Oakland Athletics
SS	Bert Campaneris	Oakland Athletics	did not play
SS	Bobby Grich	Baltimore Orioles	started for Aparicio
SS	Toby Harrah	Texas Rangers	injured
SS	Freddie Patek	Kansas City Royals	injured
OF	Carlos May	Chicago White Sox
OF	Amos Otis	Kansas City Royals	injured
OF	Lou Piniella	Kansas City Royals
OF	Joe Rudi	Oakland Athletics
OF	Richie Scheinblum	Kansas City Royals
OF	Reggie Smith	Boston Red Sox

=== Coaching staff ===
Position	Manager	Team
Manager	Earl Weaver	Baltimore Orioles
Coach	Bob Lemon	Kansas City Royals
Coach	Dick Williams	Oakland Athletics

== National League roster ==
The National League roster included 16 future Hall of Fame players and coaches, denoted in italics.

=== Elected starters ===
Position	Player	Team	Notes
C	Johnny Bench	Cincinnati Reds
1B	Lee May	Houston Astros
2B	Joe Morgan	Cincinnati Reds
3B	Joe Torre	St. Louis Cardinals
SS	Don Kessinger	Chicago Cubs
OF	Hank Aaron	Atlanta Braves
OF	Roberto Clemente	Pittsburgh Pirates	did not play (knee)
OF	Willie Stargell	Pittsburgh Pirates

=== Pitchers ===
Throws	Pitcher	Team	Notes
RH	Steve Blass	Pittsburgh Pirates
LH	Steve Carlton	Philadelphia Phillies
RH	Clay Carroll	Cincinnati Reds	did not pitch
RH	Bob Gibson	St. Louis Cardinals	starting pitcher
RH	Ferguson Jenkins	Chicago Cubs	did not pitch
LH	Tug McGraw	New York Mets
RH	Gary Nolan	Cincinnati Reds	injured
RH	Tom Seaver	New York Mets	did not pitch
RH	Bill Stoneman	Montreal Expos
RH	Don Sutton	Los Angeles Dodgers

=== Reserve position players ===
Position	Player	Team	Notes
C	Manny Sanguillén	Pittsburgh Pirates
C	Ted Simmons	St. Louis Cardinals	did not play
1B	Nate Colbert	San Diego Padres
2B	Glenn Beckert	Chicago Cubs
3B	Ron Santo	Chicago Cubs
SS	Chris Speier	San Francisco Giants
OF	Lou Brock	St. Louis Cardinals	did not play
OF	César Cedeño	Houston Astros
OF	Willie Mays	New York Mets	started for Clemente
OF	Al Oliver	Pittsburgh Pirates
OF	Billy Williams	Chicago Cubs

=== Coaching staff ===
Position	Manager	Team
Manager	Danny Murtaugh	Pittsburgh Pirates
Coach	Charlie Fox	San Francisco Giants
Coach	Red Schoendienst	St. Louis Cardinals

== Starting lineups ==
While the starters were elected by the fans, the batting orders and starting pitchers were selected by the managers.

American League				National League			
Order	Player	Team	Position	Order	Player	Team	Position
1	Rod Carew	Minnesota Twins	2B	1	Joe Morgan	Cincinnati Reds	2B
2	Bobby Murcer	New York Yankees	CF	2	Willie Mays	New York Mets	CF
3	Reggie Jackson	Oakland Athletics	RF	3	Hank Aaron	Atlanta Braves	RF
4	Dick Allen	Chicago White Sox	1B	4	Willie Stargell	Pittsburgh Pirates	LF
5	Carl Yastrzemski	Boston Red Sox	LF	5	Johnny Bench	Cincinnati Reds	C
6	Bobby Grich	Baltimore Orioles	SS	6	Lee May	Houston Astros	1B
7	Brooks Robinson	Baltimore Orioles	3B	7	Joe Torre	St. Louis Cardinals	3B
8	Bill Freehan	Detroit Tigers	C	8	Don Kessinger	Chicago Cubs	SS
9	Jim Palmer	Baltimore Orioles	P	9	Bob Gibson	St. Louis Cardinals	P

== Umpires ==
Position	Umpire
Home Plate	Stan Landes (NL)
First Base	Lou DiMuro (AL)
Second Base	Lee Weyer (NL)
Third Base	Jerry Neudecker (AL)
Left Field	Jerry Dale (NL)
Right Field	Bill Kunkel (AL)

== Scoring summary ==
The American League opened the game's scoring in the top of the third, with Steve Blass in to relieve Bob Gibson. Bill Freehan walked, and advanced to second base on a sacrifice bunt by Jim Palmer. Rod Carew singled, allowing Freehan to score.

The National League would not answer until the bottom of the sixth inning, with Gaylord Perry pitching in relief. With two outs, César Cedeño singled. Hank Aaron then hit a two-run home run to give the National League the lead.

The AL would respond in the top of the eighth inning against Bill Stoneman in his second inning of relief. Carlton Fisk singled, and after a strikeout, Cookie Rojas (pinch hitting for Rod Carew) hit a two-run home run.

Wilbur Wood was in his second inning of relief when, in the bottom of the ninth inning, the National League evened the score. Billy Williams and Manny Sanguillén hit back-to-back singles, with Sanguillen's sending Williams to third base. Lee May hit into a fielder's choice, forcing Sanguillen out at second, but permitting Williams to score. After Ron Santo grounded into a double play, the score was tied at 3, forcing extra innings.

In the bottom of the tenth inning, Dave McNally came on in relief for the AL. The first batter he faced, Nate Colbert (pinch hitting for Tug McGraw), walked. Colbert advanced to second on a sacrifice bunt by Chris Speier. Joe Morgan singled, scoring Colbert and ending the game.

=== Line score ===
Tuesday, July 25, 1972 8:15 pm (ET) at Atlanta Stadium in Atlanta, Georgia
Team	1	2	3	4	5	6	7	8	9	10	R	H	E
American League	0	0	1	0	0	0	0	2	0	0	3	6	0
National League	0	0	0	0	0	2	0	0	1	1	4	8	0
WP: Tug McGraw (1-0) LP: Dave McNally (0-1); Home runs: AL: Cookie Rojas (1); NL: Hank Aaron (1)

== Game notes and records ==
Tug McGraw was credited with the win. Dave McNally was charged with the loss.

This was the fifth All-Star Game to reach extra innings. After this one, the National League was 5–0 in those extra inning games.

The home run hit by Hank Aaron was the last one in an All-Star Game by a player from the host team for 25 years. This did not happen again until Sandy Alomar Jr. of the Cleveland Indians homered at Jacobs Field in the 1997 All-Star Game.

The homer by Cookie Rojas, a native of Cuba, was the first one ever hit in an All-Star Game for the American League by a player who was born outside the United States.

Nate Colbert, who scored the winning run, brought the wrong uniform with him to Atlanta. The San Diego Padres' slugger donned his road jersey with SAN DIEGO on it instead of his home one with PADRES on it. Both of San Diego's jerseys in 1972 and 1973 were gold. Seven days after the All-Star Game, Colbert racked up 13 RBI in a doubleheader vs. the Braves in the same stadium, setting a Major League record for a twinbill which was tied in 1993 by Mark Whiten for the St. Louis Cardinals.

With Toby Harrah injured, the Texas Rangers did not have an active player on the AL squad in their first season in Arlington, Texas. The Rangers were originally the second incarnation of the Washington Senators, leaving the nation's capital in November 1971 after 11 seasons.

Players from the Red Sox and Giants debuted double-knit uniforms in this game. After the Pirates (1970), Cardinals and Orioles (each in 1971) were the first teams to switch, two-thirds of MLB (16 of 24) donned new double-knits to begin 1972. The three remaining teams wearing flannels full-time, the Expos, Royals and Yankees, switched to double-kits to start 1973.
