= 1970 Los Angeles Dodgers season =

1970 Los Angeles Dodgers
- League: National League
- Division: West
- Ballpark: Dodger Stadium
- City: Los Angeles
- Record: 87–74 (.540)
- Divisional place: 2nd
- Owners: Walter O'Malley, James Mulvey
- President: Peter O'Malley
- General managers: Al Campanis
- Managers: Walter Alston
- Television: KTTV (11)
- Radio: KFI; Vin Scully, Jerry Doggett; KWKW; Jose Garcia, Jaime Jarrín

The 1970 Los Angeles Dodgers season was the 81st for the franchise in Major League Baseball, and their 13th season in Los Angeles, California. Walter O'Malley stepped down as team president, turning the reins over to his son Peter, while remaining as the team's chairman. The Dodgers remained competitive, finishing the season in second place, 14 1/2 games behind the NL Champion Cincinnati Reds in the National League West. The away jerseys removed the city name and instead had the team nickname which would stay until 1999 when the city name returned to the road uniforms, where it has remained ever since.

== Regular season ==
=== Season standings ===
NL West
| Team | W | L | Pct. | GB | Home | Road |
|---|---|---|---|---|---|---|
| Cincinnati Reds | 102 | 60 | .630 | — | 57‍–‍24 | 45‍–‍36 |
| Los Angeles Dodgers | 87 | 74 | .540 | 14½ | 39‍–‍42 | 48‍–‍32 |
| San Francisco Giants | 86 | 76 | .531 | 16 | 48‍–‍33 | 38‍–‍43 |
| Houston Astros | 79 | 83 | .488 | 23 | 44‍–‍37 | 35‍–‍46 |
| Atlanta Braves | 76 | 86 | .469 | 26 | 42‍–‍39 | 34‍–‍47 |
| San Diego Padres | 63 | 99 | .389 | 39 | 31‍–‍50 | 32‍–‍49 |

=== Record vs. opponents ===
1970 National League record Sources:
| Team | ATL | CHC | CIN | HOU | LAD | MON | NYM | PHI | PIT | SD | SF | STL |
|---|---|---|---|---|---|---|---|---|---|---|---|---|
| Atlanta | — | 8–4 | 5–13 | 9–9 | 6–12 | 6–6 | 6–6 | 7–5 | 6–6 | 9–9 | 7–11 | 7–5 |
| Chicago | 4–8 | — | 7–5 | 7–5 | 6–6 | 13–5 | 7–11 | 9–9 | 8–10 | 9–3 | 7–5 | 7–11 |
| Cincinnati | 13–5 | 5–7 | — | 15–3 | 13–5 | 7–5 | 8–4 | 7–5 | 8–4 | 8–10 | 9–9 | 9–3 |
| Houston | 9–9 | 5–7 | 3–15 | — | 8–10 | 8–4 | 6–6 | 4–8 | 6–6 | 14–4 | 10–8 | 6–6 |
| Los Angeles | 12–6 | 6–6 | 5–13 | 10–8 | — | 8–4 | 7–5 | 6–5 | 6–6 | 11–7 | 9–9 | 7–5 |
| Montreal | 6–6 | 5–13 | 5–7 | 4–8 | 4–8 | — | 10–8 | 11–7 | 9–9 | 6–6 | 6–6 | 7–11 |
| New York | 6–6 | 11–7 | 4–8 | 6–6 | 5–7 | 8–10 | — | 13–5 | 6–12 | 6–6 | 6–6 | 12–6 |
| Philadelphia | 5-7 | 9–9 | 5–7 | 8–4 | 5–6 | 7–11 | 5–13 | — | 4–14 | 9–3 | 8–4 | 8–10 |
| Pittsburgh | 6–6 | 10–8 | 4–8 | 6–6 | 6–6 | 9–9 | 12–6 | 14–4 | — | 6–6 | 4–8 | 12–6 |
| San Diego | 9–9 | 3–9 | 10–8 | 4–14 | 7–11 | 6–6 | 6–6 | 3–9 | 6–6 | — | 5–13 | 4–8 |
| San Francisco | 11–7 | 5–7 | 9–9 | 8–10 | 9–9 | 6–6 | 6–6 | 4–8 | 8–4 | 13–5 | — | 7–5 |
| St. Louis | 5–7 | 11–7 | 3–9 | 6–6 | 5–7 | 11–7 | 6–12 | 10–8 | 6–12 | 8–4 | 5–7 | — |

=== Opening Day lineup ===
Opening Day starters
| Name | Position |
|---|---|
| Maury Wills | Shortstop |
| Bill Buckner | Left fielder |
| Willie Davis | Center fielder |
| Willie Crawford | Right fielder |
| Wes Parker | First baseman |
| Steve Garvey | Third baseman |
| Tom Haller | Catcher |
| Ted Sizemore | Second baseman |
| Claude Osteen | Starting pitcher |

=== Notable transactions ===
- August 21, 1970: Jerry Royster was signed as an amateur free agent by the Dodgers.
- August 24, 1970: Sergio Ferrer was signed as an amateur free agent by the Dodgers.
- September 28, 1970: Fred Norman was purchased from the Dodgers by the St. Louis Cardinals.

=== Roster ===
1970 Los Angeles Dodgers
Roster
| Pitchers: 21 Jim Brewer; 44 Alan Foster; 49 Charlie Hough; 34 Ray Lamb; 31 Al McBean; 46 Pete Mikkelsen; 25 Joe Moeller; 35 Fred Norman; 23 Claude Osteen; 17 Camilo Pascual; 49 José Peña; 40 Bill Singer; 45 Jerry Stephenson; 37 Mike Strahler; 20 Don Sutton; 38 Sandy Vance | Catchers: 45 Joe Ferguson; 15 Tom Haller; 8 Bob Stinson; 16 Bill Sudakis; 10 Jeff Torborg; Infielders: 6 Steve Garvey; 1 Billy Grabarkewitz; 5 Jim Lefebvre; 28 Wes Parker; 41 Ted Sizemore; 30 Maury Wills | Outfielders: 22 Bill Buckner; 27 Willie Crawford; 3 Willie Davis; 14 Len Gabrielson; 12 Von Joshua; 9 Andy Kosco; 31 Gary Moore; 11 Manny Mota; 53 Tom Paciorek; 18 Bill Russell | Manager: 24 Walter Alston; Coaches: 26 Red Adams; 52 Carroll Beringer; 19 Jim Gilliam; 7 Roy Hartsfield; 33 Danny Ozark; 51 Dixie Walker |

=== First major league foul ball injury death ===
On May 16, the Dodgers were playing a home game against the Giants when, during the third inning, Mota fouled off a Gaylord Perry pitch into the stands near first base. It struck Alan Fish, 14, attending the game with other boys from his nearby recreational baseball team and their coach. Fish was unconscious for a minute, and spoke incoherently when he reawakened and, while his speech had recovered, needed assistance walking to the Dodger Stadium's first-aid center.

There, he seemed to have recovered completely. The stadium doctor did not ask whether he had lost consciousness or check his blood pressure, and released him after giving him two aspirin for the lingering pain. He returned to his seat and watched the rest of the game normally, even trying to get autographs from the Dodgers afterwards. However, on his return home he began experiencing dizziness, shaking and crying, and his parents decided to take him to a hospital.

Two hospitals were unable to take the boy immediately, even as his condition deteriorated, and he was not admitted until early the next morning. His condition at first improved, but then became even worse, and a neurosurgeon discovered a large mass at the site of the injury. Before he could operate, however, Fish suffered a convulsion that left him brain dead, and three days later he died after being taken off life support.

The autopsy found that Fish had died due to an intracerebral hemorrhage after the hairline fracture caused by the foul ball had pushed a piece of his skull into his brain. Had he been required to rest and hospitalized immediately afterward, the neurosurgeon believed he could have recovered completely. The Fishes sued the Dodgers, the stadium physician and the two hospitals that had not been able to treat their son for negligence and medical malpractice; at trial, after dropping the other hospitals, the jury found for the team and doctor. However, an appeals court reversed that verdict three years later due to a jury instruction that should have been given but was not.

== Game log ==
=== Regular season ===
Legend
| | Dodgers win |
| | Dodgers loss |
| | Postponement |
| | Eliminated from playoff race |
| **Bold** | Dodgers team member |

1970 regular season game log: 87–74 (Home: 39–42; Away: 48–32)
April: 10–10 (Home: 5–8; Away: 5–2)

| # | Date | Time (PT) | Opponent | Score | Win | Loss | Save | Time of Game | Attendance | Record | Box/ Streak |

May: 18–10 (Home: 7–6; Away: 11–4)

| # | Date | Time (PT) | Opponent | Score | Win | Loss | Save | Time of Game | Attendance | Record | Box/ Streak |

June: 15–12 (Home: 8–6; Away: 9–6)

| # | Date | Time (PT) | Opponent | Score | Win | Loss | Save | Time of Game | Attendance | Record | Box/ Streak |

July: 16–10 (Home: 5–4; Away: 11–6)

| # | Date | Time (PT) | Opponent | Score | Win | Loss | Save | Time of Game | Attendance | Record | Box/ Streak |

August: 13–16 (Home: 6–11; Away: 7–5)

| # | Date | Time (PT) | Opponent | Score | Win | Loss | Save | Time of Game | Attendance | Record | Box/ Streak |

September: 14–16 (Home: 8–7; Away: 6–9)

| # | Date | Time (PT) | Opponent | Score | Win | Loss | Save | Time of Game | Attendance | Record | Box/ Streak |

October: 1–0 (Home: 0–0; Away: 1–0)

| # | Date | Time (PT) | Opponent | Score | Win | Loss | Save | Time of Game | Attendance | Record | Box/ Streak |

== Player stats ==
=== Batting ===
==== Starters by position ====
Note: Pos = Position; G = Games played; AB = At bats; H = Hits; Avg. = Batting average; HR = Home runs; RBI = Runs batted in

| Pos | Player | G | AB | H | Avg. | HR | RBI |
|---|---|---|---|---|---|---|---|
| C | Tom Haller | 112 | 325 | 93 | .286 | 10 | 47 |
| 1B | Wes Parker | 161 | 614 | 196 | .319 | 10 | 111 |
| 2B | Ted Sizemore | 96 | 340 | 104 | .306 | 1 | 34 |
| SS | Maury Wills | 132 | 522 | 141 | .270 | 0 | 34 |
| 3B | Billy Grabarkewitz | 156 | 529 | 153 | .289 | 17 | 84 |
| LF | Manny Mota | 124 | 417 | 127 | .305 | 3 | 37 |
| CF | Willie Davis | 146 | 593 | 181 | .305 | 8 | 93 |
| RF | Willie Crawford | 109 | 299 | 70 | .234 | 8 | 40 |

==== Other batters ====
Note: G = Games played; AB = At bats; H = Hits; Avg. = Batting average; HR = Home runs; RBI = Runs batted in

| Player | G | AB | H | Avg. | HR | RBI |
|---|---|---|---|---|---|---|
| Jim Lefebvre | 109 | 314 | 79 | .252 | 4 | 44 |
| Bill Russell | 81 | 278 | 72 | .259 | 0 | 28 |
| Bill Sudakis | 94 | 269 | 71 | .264 | 14 | 44 |
| Andy Kosco | 74 | 224 | 51 | .228 | 8 | 27 |
| Jeff Torborg | 64 | 134 | 31 | .231 | 1 | 17 |
| Von Joshua | 72 | 109 | 29 | .266 | 1 | 8 |
| Steve Garvey | 34 | 93 | 25 | .269 | 1 | 6 |
| Bill Buckner | 28 | 68 | 13 | .191 | 0 | 4 |
| Len Gabrielson | 43 | 42 | 8 | .190 | 0 | 6 |
| Gary Moore | 7 | 16 | 3 | .188 | 0 | 0 |
| Tom Paciorek | 8 | 9 | 2 | .222 | 0 | 0 |
| Joe Ferguson | 5 | 4 | 1 | .250 | 0 | 1 |
| Bob Stinson | 4 | 3 | 0 | .000 | 0 | 0 |

=== Pitching ===
==== Starting pitchers ====
Note: G = Games pitched; IP = Innings pitched; W = Wins; L = Losses; ERA = Earned run average; SO = Strikeouts

| Player | G | IP | W | L | ERA | SO |
|---|---|---|---|---|---|---|
| Don Sutton | 38 | 260.1 | 15 | 13 | 4.08 | 201 |
| Claude Osteen | 37 | 258.2 | 16 | 14 | 3.83 | 114 |
| Alan Foster | 33 | 198.2 | 10 | 13 | 4.26 | 83 |
| Sandy Vance | 20 | 115.0 | 7 | 7 | 3.13 | 45 |
| Bill Singer | 16 | 106.1 | 8 | 5 | 3.13 | 93 |

==== Other pitchers ====
Note: G = Games pitched; IP = Innings pitched; W = Wins; L = Losses; ERA = Earned run average; SO = Strikeouts

| Player | G | IP | W | L | ERA | SO |
|---|---|---|---|---|---|---|
| Joe Moeller | 31 | 135.1 | 7 | 9 | 3.92 | 63 |

==== Relief pitchers ====
Note: G = Games pitched; W = Wins; L = Losses; SV = Saves; ERA = Earned run average; SO = Strikeouts

| Player | G | W | L | SV | ERA | SO |
|---|---|---|---|---|---|---|
| Jim Brewer | 58 | 7 | 6 | 24 | 3.13 | 91 |
| Ray Lamb | 35 | 6 | 1 | 0 | 3.79 | 32 |
| Pete Mikkelsen | 33 | 4 | 2 | 6 | 2.76 | 47 |
| Fred Norman | 30 | 2 | 0 | 1 | 5.23 | 27 |
| José Peña | 29 | 4 | 3 | 4 | 4.42 | 31 |
| Camilo Pascual | 10 | 0 | 0 | 0 | 2.57 | 8 |
| Charlie Hough | 8 | 0 | 0 | 2 | 5.29 | 8 |
| Mike Strahler | 6 | 1 | 1 | 1 | 1.45 | 11 |
| Jerry Stephenson | 3 | 0 | 0 | 0 | 9.45 | 6 |
| Al McBean | 1 | 0 | 0 | 0 | 0.00 | 0 |

== Awards and honors ==
- Gold Glove Award
  - Wes Parker
- NL Player of the Month
  - Bill Singer (July 1970)

=== All-Stars ===
- 1970 Major League Baseball All-Star Game
  - Billy Grabarkewitz reserve
  - Claude Osteen reserve

== Farm system ==
| Level | Team | League | Manager |
|---|---|---|---|
| AAA | Spokane Indians | Pacific Coast League | Tommy Lasorda |
| AA | Albuquerque Dodgers | Texas League | Del Crandall |
| A | Bakersfield Dodgers | California League | Don LeJohn |
| A | Daytona Beach Dodgers | Florida State League | Stan Wasiak |
| A | Medford Dodgers | Northwest League | Bill Berrier |
| Rookie | Ogden Dodgers | Pioneer League | Buddy Hollowell |

LEAGUE CHAMPIONS: Albuquerque, Bakersfield

== 1970 Major League Baseball draft ==
This was the sixth year of a Major League Baseball draft. The Dodgers drafted 45 players in the June draft and nine in the January draft, six of them would eventually play in MLB.

The most notable pick in this years draft was pitcher Doug Rau, who was selected with the 1st pick in the June Secondary draft out of Texas A&M University. Rau would play for the Dodgers from 1972 to 1979 and made 184 starts for the team, with an 80–58 record and 3.30 ERA before spending his final season with the California Angels in 1981.

The first pick in the regular June draft was pitcher Jim Haller from Creighton Prep High School. Haller was 18–18 in 123 minor league games over six seasons, with a 3.65 ERA.

1970 draft picks

=== January draft ===
| Round | Name | Position | School | Signed | Career span | Highest level |
|---|---|---|---|---|---|---|
| 1 | Jim Burnes | RHP | Glendale Community College | No | | |
| 2 | Edward Womboldt | C | Indian Hills Community College | No | | |
| 3 | David Holmes | C | Glendale Community College | No; Cubs – 1972 FA | 1972 | Rookie |
| 4 | Ralph Davis | RHP | Alice High School | Yes | 1970–1971 | A- |
| 5 | Ken Harris | 1B | Pasadena City College | No; Angels – June 1970 | 1970–1971 | A |

==== January secondary phase ====
| Round | Name | Position | School | Signed | Career span | Highest level |
|---|---|---|---|---|---|---|
| 1 | John LaRose | LHP | Cumberland High School | No; Red Sox – June 1970 | 1970–1980 | MLB |
| 2 | Kevin Kooyman | C | Grossmont College | No; Reds – 1970 FA | 1970–1973 | A |
| 3 | Bruce Raible | RHP | Western Hills High School | Yes | 1970–1972 | AA |
| 4 | Mike Barlow | RHP | Syracuse University | No; Athletics – 1970 FA | 1970–1982 | MLB |

=== June draft ===
| Round | Name | Position | School | Signed | Career span | Highest level |
|---|---|---|---|---|---|---|
| 1 | Jim Haller | RHP | Creighton Prep High School | Yes | 1970–1975 | AAA |
| 2 | Randy Fairbanks | LHP | Satellite Beach High School | Yes | 1970–1975 | AA |
| 3 | Lance Rautzhan | LHP | Blue Mountain High School | Yes | 1970–1980 | MLB |
| 4 | Rick Nitz | RHP | Hoover High School | Yes | 1970–1978 | AAA |
| 5 | Dewey Forry | OF | Terra Linda High School | Yes | 1972–1977 | AAA |
| 6 | Janes Vaeth | RHP | Seaford High School | No | | |
| 7 | Thomas Jenkins | OF | University of Tulsa | Yes | 1970–1972 | AA |
| 8 | Rex Peters | 1B | Midland Park High School | No | | |
| 9 | John Snider | 3B | Fairfield Union High School | Yes | 1970–1975 | AA |
| 10 | Wayne Ristig | 2B | Chapman University | Yes | 1970–1973 | A |
| 11 | Creighton Tevlin | OF | Canoga Park High School | No; Orioles – 1974 | 1974–1982 | AAA |
| 12 | Patrick Paulson | LHP | East Haven High School | No; Dodgers – 1971 | 1971 | Rookie |
| 13 | Norman Brown | OF | University of California, Berkeley | Yes | 1970–1971 | A |
| 14 | Thomas Corder | SS | San Jose State University | Yes | 1970–1972 | A |
| 15 | John Cosmos | 1B | Sacred Heart University | No | | |
| 16 | Michael Plunkett | RHP | Emporia State University | Yes | 1970–1971 | A |
| 17 | Mike Vail | SS | Archbishop Mitty High School | No; Cardinals -1971 | 1971–1984 | MLB |
| 18 | Larry Tolbert | RHP | East Central High School | No | | |
| 19 | Paul Barnes | OF | Middle Georgia College | Yes | 1970–1971 | A |
| 20 | Philip Keller | RHP | Stanford University | Yes | 1970–1974 | AAA |
| 21 | Albert Taylor | RHP | Kearny High School | Yes | 1970–1974 | A |
| 22 | Wayne Burney | 1B | University of Louisiana at Monroe | Yes | 1970–1975 | AAA |
| 23 | Leslie Rogers | 3B | University of Tulsa | Yes | 1970–1971 | A |
| 24 | Francisco Suarez | SS | Hialeah High School | No; Twins – 1971 | 1971 | A- |
| 25 | Dennis Abel | OF | San Francisco State University | No | | |
| 26 | Thomas Gleason | LHP | Grover Cleveland High School | Yes | 1970–1972 | A |
| 27 | John Wade | C | Pasadena High School | No | | |
| 28 | Ronald Hall | LHP | University of Oklahoma | Yes | 1970–1972 | A |
| 29 | Steven Wilson | RHP | South Georgia College | Yes | 1970–1972 | A |
| 30 | James Ivey | LHP | | No; Braves – 1971 FA | 1971 | A |
| 31 | Bruce Collins | RHP | South San Francisco High School | No | | |
| 32 | Thaddeus Rowe | INF | Brookland-Cayce High School | No | | |
| 33 | Greg Shanahan | RHP | Humboldt State University | Yes | 1970–1977 | MLB |
| 34 | Chris Kinsel | C | St. Augustine High School | No | | |
| 35 | Mike Garrett | OF | | No | | |
| 36 | Mark Anderson | OF | Garden Grove High School | No; Cardinals -1971 | 1971 | Rookie |
| 37 | Michael Sanders | 3B | D. W. Daniel High School | No | | |
| 38 | Maury Damkroger | C | Northeast High School | No | | |
| 39 | Vandon Mattison | LHP | John F. Kennedy High School | Yes | 1970–1975 | A |
| 40 | Scott Waltermate | RHP | Steeleville High School | No | | |

==== June secondary phase ====
| Round | Name | Position | School | Signed | Career span | Highest level |
|---|---|---|---|---|---|---|
| 1 | Doug Rau | LHP | Texas A&M University | Yes | 1970–1981 | MLB |
| 2 | George Pugh | LHP | Mesa State College | No | | |
| 3 | Red Daniels | OF | University of New Mexico | Yes | 1970–1973 | AA |
| 4 | Kenneth O'Brien | RHP | Villanova University | Yes | 1970–1972 | AA |
| 5 | Paul Womble | 3B | University of Kansas | No; Mets -1971 | 1971–1973 | AA |
