= 1973 Houston Astros season =

Twelfth season in Major League Baseball for the Houston Astros

1973 Houston Astros
- League: National League
- Division: West
- Ballpark: Astrodome
- City: Houston, Texas
- Record: 82–80 (.506)
- Divisional place: 4th
- Owners: Roy Hofheinz
- General managers: Spec Richardson
- Managers: Leo Durocher
- Television: KPRC-TV
- Radio: KPRC (AM) (Gene Elston, Loel Passe)

The 1973 Houston Astros season was the 12th season for the Major League Baseball (MLB) franchise located in Houston, Texas, their ninth as the Astros, 12th in the National League (NL), fifth in the NL West division, and ninth at The Astrodome. The Astros entered the season having posted a record of 84–69—the first-ever winning season in franchise history—in second place in the NL West, 10 1/2 games behind the division-champion and NL pennant-winning Cincinnati Reds.

On April 6, Dave Roberts made his first Opening Day start for the Astros, who defeated the Braves at Atlanta Stadium, 2–1. During the amateur draft, Houston selected shortstop Calvin Portley in the first round, and pitcher Joe Sambito in the 17th round.

Center fielder César Cedeño and left fielder Bob Watson represented the Astros at the MLB All-Star Game and played for the National League. It was the second career selection for Cedeño and first for Watson. Cedeño produced a second consecutive 20–50 club season, with 25 home runs and 56 stolen bases, the first major leaguer to accomplish this feat.

The Astros concluded the regular season fourth in the NL West with a record of 82–80, 17 games behind the division champions, Cincinnati. Hence, this performance established the Astros' first-ever instance of consecutive winning seasons.

Following the season, Cedeño (second career selection), shortstop Roger Metzger (first) and third baseman Doug Rader (fourth) each earned Gold Glove Awards. For the first time in the award's history, this Gold Glove edition rostered three Astros players.

== Offseason ==
=== Summary ===
Leo Durocher managed the Astros for one full season in 1973.

The Houston Astros concluded the 1972 campaign having delivered myriad best-ever showings to date, including an 84–69 (.549) record, among other first-time club achievements. Houston tied for second place with the Los Angeles Dodgers and 10 1/2 games behind the division-champion Cincinnati Reds. The 84 victories surpassed the 1969 iteration (81), and in winning percentage (.500). The Astros led the National League in runs scored (708) for the first time, while blasting a then-club record 134 home runs—placing third in the Senior Circuit, and tied that figure this year. (Note: Surpassed in 1993 with 138.) Center fielder César Cedeño became the second Major Leaguer to attain the 20–50 club. Moreover, Cedeño became the first player in franchise history to hit for the cycle (August 2), earned a Gold Glove Award, MLB All-Star selection, and The Sporting News NL All-Star honors. Third baseman Doug Rader also received the Gold Glove accolade, the first time Houston had fielded multiple Gold Glove winners.

=== Transactions ===
- November 27, 1972: Rich Chiles and Buddy Harris were traded by the Astros to the New York Mets for Tommie Agee.
- January 10, 1973: Mike Stanton was drafted by the Astros in the 1st round (5th pick) of the 1973 Major League Baseball draft (secondary phase).

== Regular season ==
=== Summary ===
==== April ====
Opening Day starting lineup
Uniform	Player	Position
24	Jimmy Wynn	Right fielder
19	Tommy Helms	Second baseman
28	César Cedeño	Center fielder
27	Bob Watson	Left fielder
23	Lee May	First baseman
12	Doug Rader	Third baseman
7	Johnny Edwards	Catcher
14	Roger Metzger	Shortstop
15	Dave Roberts	Pitcher
Venue: Atlanta Stadium • Houston 2, Atlanta 1 Sources:

The Astros played Opening Day on April 6 at Atlanta Stadium, where they defeated the Braves, 2–1. In the top of the 13th inning, César Cedeño doubled home Tommy Helms for the game-winning run batted in (RBI), one of his three extra-base hits. Jimmy Wynn slammed a game-tying home run in the sixth. Astros Opening Day starter Dave Roberts lasted the first nine innings, scattered eight hits, and allowed one run.

Starting April 9, Bob Watson authored a career-high 19-game hitting streak, batting .388. The streak lasted until April 27.

The first-ever Player of the Week Award was presented for the National League by president Chub Feeney to Astros left fielder Jimmy Wynn for the week ended April 16, 1973. Considering the 11 games played since Opening Day on April 6, Wynn connected for 6 home runs, 10 RBI, one double, one triple, and had carried a batting average of .313 (15-for-48).

==== May ====
For the week of April 27 to May 3, Bob Watson batted .333 over five games, with three home runs, six RBI, an .833 slugging percentage (SLG). The terminus of his 19-game hitting occurred on April 28, when Watson went 0-for-4. The following day, he hit two home runs to lead a 4–3 triumph over the Montreal Expos. Houston won each of the five contests. Watson won the fourth NL Player of the Week honors, succeeding Jerry Koosman of the New York Mets, and following Jim Wynn as the second Astro.

Displeased with the result of a contest on May 15, Houston GM Spec Richardson resorted to sending his message through the scoreboard of the Astrodome, blaming umpires Augie Donatelli and Bruce Froemming for blown calls in a 4–1 loss to the Atlanta Braves. He charged the missed calls changed the outcome of the game; however, this instead resulted in a $500 fine.

Down 7–0 on May 20, the San Francisco Giants came all the way back to tie, 7–7. However, a solo home run from Jimmy Wynn gave Houston an 8–7 win, while also allowing them to take sole possession of first place.

Beginning May 30, and until June 21, Lee May put together a 21-game hitting streak to set a franchise record, punctuated by his performance during the final four days from June 17–21. On June 17, May went 3-for-5, including his 1,000th career hit.

==== June ====
Lee May proceeded to tie another club record with three home runs in one game on June 21, (Note: The second three-home run game in club history, May was preceded by Wynn on June 15, 1967, while Glenn Davis succeeded him on September 10, 1987.) the only three-home run game and four-run contest of his career, and Tommy Helms connected for the only grand slam of his career. Meanwhile, Ken Forsch hurled a complete game to lead a 12–2 win over the San Diego Padres. César Cedeño also homered (11) among three hits and Bob Watson scored thrice. Helms hit the grand slam in top of the fourth inning off Mike Corkins.

During the final four games of Lee's hitting streak he collected 13 RBI. Over the entirety of the steak, Lee batted .407, going 35-for-86. One curiosity emerged as Lee did not draw any bases on balls from the streak's start to finish. His record displaced Rusty Staub's 20-game streak from June 30 to July 21, 1967, and remained until surpassed by teammate César Cedeño from August 25 to September 21, 1977, when Cedeño hit in 22 contests consecutively. On June 22, 1973, the day that Lee's streak ended, he went 0-for-2 while drawing two walks.

==== MLB All-Star Game ====
Center fielder César Cedeño and left fielder Bob Watson were both recognized as MLB All-Stars, representing the Astros, while the game was hosted at Royals Stadium. Cedeño was named starter at center field, his first time as starter, first Astro to start at the position, and first All-Star Game starter from the Astros since teammate Lee May at first base during the 1972 Classic. This was the second career selection for Cedeño and first for Watson. Cedeño collected a single and an RBI in three at bats while Watson was inserted as a defensive replacement in left field as the National League defeated the American League, 7–1.

==== August ====
A harbinger of their fortunes against this moundsman, J. R. Richard chucked his first major league shutout on August 1, a 5–0 triumph over the Los Angeles Dodgers. Shaking a deep slump, Jimmy Wynn collected a double, single, drew a base on balls and hit a run batted in (RBI) to spearhead Houston's tallies.

On August 20, Richard stymied the Pittsburgh Pirates on a complete game two-hitter as Houston bombed to a 10-2 triumph. He took a no-hit bid into the seventh until Al Oliver singled with two outs By that point, Lee May had blasted a three-run shot in the bottom of the fourth and Bob Watson followed up in the fifth by launching a grand slam. Richard ended up with nine strikeouts and a game score of 81. Watson's grand slam was Houston's fifth of the season, tying the club record set in 1970.

==== September ====
At the Astrodome on September 22, Hank Aaron hoisted a Dave Roberts offering into the left field stands during the sixth inning for his 712th career home run. The enormous outfield scoreboard commemorated Aaron's blast with, “712!” adding, “Aaron is now two away from tying mark + 3 from 715!” Aaron received one more at bat that evening, fouling out to first baseman Lee May. The Astros and Braves faced each other for four of the final six bouts of the season.

During the penultimate day of the season on September 29, Hank Aaron hammered a Jerry Reuss offering for his 40th home runs of the campaign during the fifth inning, and 713th of his career, placing Aaron just one home run away from Babe Ruth for the all-time Major League lead. The excitement crescendoed as Atlanta dropped Houston, 7–0. Darrell Evans (41) and Dusty Baker (21) also went deep, while Baker added a double (29).

On the final day of the campaign, also against Atlanta, Dave Roberts and Don Wilson collaborated to limit Aaron to three singles, placing his all-time home record quest on hiatus until the following season. Roberts (17–11) tossed the first six frames of a 5–3 Houston victory, while Wilson (2) etched a three-inning save. César Cedeño went deep (25} and purloined two more bases (56), but was also twice caught stealing (15). Doug Rader doubled (26) while collecting three safeties.

==== Performance overview ====
Houston concluded the season with an 82–80 (.506) record, in fourth place and trailing the division-champion Reds by 17 games. Though the Astros' record slipped from a then-franchise best 84–69 (.549) by two victories and from second to fourth place, the 1972–1973 campaigns distinguished the first time in franchise annals with consecutive winning seasons. This was their third season of 81 wins or more (also 1969). Moreover, the 82 wins signified a fifth consecutive season of winning a minimum of 79 bouts, after having lost 90 or more contests in each of the first seven campaigns.

This Astros team golfed 134 home runs, which equaled the 1972 ensemble for the club record. The record maintained until the 1993, when that team hit 138. Their five grand slams tied the team record established in 1970, which they tied again in 1986, and surpassed in 1989 (six).

Cedeño proceeded to repeat the 20–50 club for the second consecutive season, with 25 home runs and 56 stolen bases, also accomplished that year by former Houston Astros teammate Joe Morgan, then a member of the Cincinnati Reds. Cedeño became the first player in major league history to repeat over consecutive seasons. In addition, Cedeño expanded on his status as the first Astro to attain 50 stolen bases for a second campaign, during a club-record span of six consecutive seasons through 1977. (Note: For single seasons, playing for HOU, in the regular season, requiring stolen bases ≥ 50, sorted by descending stolen bases.)

Also for the first time, the Astros headlined three Gold Glove awardees. Third baseman Doug Rader captured a third sequential to extend his club record. Cedeño was recognized among outfielders for a second season, joining Rader as Astros who had won in multiple seasons. Meanwhile, Roger Metzger drew his first, also becoming the first Astro to win for the position of shortstop.

=== Season standings ===
NL West
Team	W	L	Pct.	GB	Home	Road
Cincinnati Reds	99	63	.611	—	50‍–‍31	49‍–‍32
Los Angeles Dodgers	95	66	.590	3½	50‍–‍31	45‍–‍35
San Francisco Giants	88	74	.543	11	47‍–‍34	41‍–‍40
Houston Astros	82	80	.506	17	41‍–‍40	41‍–‍40
Atlanta Braves	76	85	.472	22½	40‍–‍40	36‍–‍45
San Diego Padres	60	102	.370	39	31‍–‍50	29‍–‍52

=== Record versus opponents ===
National League

1973 National League record Sources:
Team	ATL	CHC	CIN	HOU	LAD	MON	NYM	PHI	PIT	SD	SF	STL
Atlanta	—	7–5	5–13	11–7	2–15–1	6–6	6–6	6–6	7–5	12–6	8–10	6–6
Chicago	5–7	—	8–4	6–6	5–7	9–9	10–7	10–8	6–12	7–5	2–10	9–9
Cincinnati	13–5	4–8	—	11–7	11–7	8–4	8–4	8–4	7–5	13–5	10–8	6–6
Houston	7–11	6–6	7–11	—	11–7	6–6	6–6	7–5	6–6	10–8	11–7	5–7
Los Angeles	15–2–1	7–5	7–11	7–11	—	7–5	7–5	9–3	10–2	9–9	9–9	8–4
Montreal	6–6	9–9	4–8	6–6	5–7	—	9–9	13–5	6–12	7–5	6–6	8–10
New York	6–6	7–10	4–8	6–6	5–7	9–9	—	9–9	13–5	8–4	5–7	10–8
Philadelphia	6–6	8–10	4–8	5–7	3–9	5–13	9–9	—	8–10	9–3	5–7	9–9
Pittsburgh	5–7	12–6	5–7	6–6	2–10	12–6	5–13	10–8	—	8–4	5–7	10–8
San Diego	6–12	5–7	5–13	8–10	9–9	5–7	4–8	3–9	4–8	—	7–11	4–8
San Francisco	10–8	10–2	8–10	7–11	9–9	6–6	7–5	7–5	7–5	11–7	—	6–6
St. Louis	6–6	9–9	6–6	7–5	4–8	10–8	8–10	9–9	8–10	8–4	6–6	—

=== Notable transactions ===
- July 31, 1973: Jesús Alou was purchased from the Astros by the Oakland Athletics.
- August 18, 1973: Tommie Agee was traded by the Astros to the St. Louis Cardinals for Dave Campbell and cash.

==== Draft picks ====
- June 5, 1973: 1973 Major League Baseball draft
  - Ken Landreaux was drafted by the Astros in the 8th round, but did not sign.
  - Mike Davey was drafted by the Astros in the 18th round, but did not sign.

=== Roster ===
1973 Houston Astros
Roster
Pitchers: 37 Mike Cosgrove; 30 Jim Crawford; 49 Larry Dierker; 43 Ken Forsch; 48 Fred Gladding; 38 Tom Griffin; 46 Doug Konieczny; 39 Juan Pizarro; 45 Jim Ray; 47 Jerry Reuss; 50 J. R. Richard; 15 Dave Roberts; 34 Cecil Upshaw; 40 Don Wilson; 42 Jim York	Catchers: 7 Johnny Edwards; 10 Larry Howard; 9 Skip Jutze; 9 Otis Thornton; Infielders: 8 Rafael Batista; 16 Ray Busse; 20 Dave Campbell; 19 Tommy Helms; 6 Cliff Johnson; 23 Lee May; 14 Roger Metzger; 12 Doug Rader; 11 Jimmy Stewart; 17 Gary Sutherland; 17 Héctor Torres	Outfielders: 20 Tommie Agee; 22 Jesús Alou; 28 César Cedeño; 22 Mike Easler; 25 Bob Gallagher; 21 Greg Gross; 21 Norm Miller; 27 Bob Watson; 24 Jimmy Wynn	Manager: 2 Leo Durocher; Coaches: 4 Preston Gómez; 1 Grady Hatton; 3 Hub Kittle; 5 Bob Lillis

== Player stats ==
=== Batting ===
==== Starters by position ====
Note: Pos = Position; G = Games played; AB = At bats; H = Hits; Avg. = Batting average; HR = Home runs; RBI = Runs batted in

Pos	Player	G	AB	H	Avg.	HR	RBI
C	Skip Jutze	90	278	62	.223	0	18
1B	Lee May	148	545	147	.270	28	105
2B	Tommy Helms	146	543	156	.287	4	61
SS	Roger Metzger	154	580	145	.250	1	35
3B	Doug Rader	154	574	146	.254	21	89
LF	Bob Watson	158	573	179	.312	16	94
CF	César Cedeño	139	525	168	.320	25	70
RF	Jim Wynn	139	481	106	.220	20	55

==== Other batters ====
Note: G = Games played; AB = At bats; H = Hits; Avg. = Batting average; HR = Home runs; RBI = Runs batted in

Player	G	AB	H	Avg.	HR	RBI
Johnny Edwards	79	250	61	.244	5	27
Tommie Agee	83	204	48	.235	8	15
Bob Gallagher	71	148	39	.264	2	10
Jimmy Stewart	61	68	13	.191	0	3
Héctor Torres	38	66	6	.091	0	2
Jesús Alou	28	55	13	.236	1	8
Gary Sutherland	16	54	14	.259	0	3
Larry Howard	20	48	8	.167	0	4
Greg Gross	14	39	9	.231	0	1
Cliff Johnson	7	20	6	.300	2	6
Ray Busse	15	17	1	.059	0	0
Rafael Batista	12	15	4	.267	0	2
Dave Campbell	9	15	4	.267	0	2
Mike Easler	6	7	0	.000	0	0
Otis Thornton	2	3	0	.000	0	1
Norm Miller	3	3	0	.000	0	0

=== Pitching ===
==== Starting pitchers ====
Note: G = Games pitched; IP = Innings pitched; W = Wins; L = Losses; ERA = Earned run average; SO = Strikeouts

Player	G	IP	W	L	ERA	SO
Jerry Reuss	41	279.1	16	13	3.74	177
Dave Roberts	39	249.1	17	11	2.85	119
Don Wilson	37	239.1	11	16	3.20	149
Doug Konieczny	2	13.0	0	1	5.54	6

==== Other pitchers ====
Note: G = Games pitched; IP = Innings pitched; W = Wins; L = Losses; ERA = Earned run average; SO = Strikeouts

Player	G	IP	W	L	ERA	SO
Ken Forsch	46	201.1	9	12	4.20	149
Tom Griffin	25	99.2	4	6	4.15	69
J.R. Richard	16	72.0	6	2	4.00	75
Larry Dierker	14	27.0	1	1	4.33	18

==== Relief pitchers ====
Note: G = Games pitched; W = Wins; L = Losses; SV = Saves; ERA = Earned run average; SO = Strikeouts

Player	G	W	L	SV	ERA	SO
Jim Crawford	48	2	4	6	4.50	56
Jim Ray	42	6	4	6	4.43	25
Jim York	41	3	4	6	4.42	22
Cecil Upshaw	35	2	3	1	4.46	21
Fred Gladding	16	2	0	1	4.50	9
Juan Pizarro	15	2	2	0	6.56	10
Mike Cosgrove	13	1	1	0	1.80	2

== Awards and achievements ==
=== Offensive achievements ===
==== Grand slams ====
No.	Date	Astros batter	Venue	Inning	Pitcher	Opposing team	Box
1	May 6	Lee May	Shea Stadium	7	Ray Sadecki	New York Mets	
2	June 21	Tommy Helms (Note: 1st MLB grand slam)	San Diego Stadium	4	Mike Corkins	San Diego Padres	
3	June 24 (Note: Game 1 of doubleheader)	César Cedeño	Candlestick Park	7	Randy Moffitt	San Francisco Giants	
4	July 4 (Note: Game 2 of doubleheader)	Lee May	Atlanta Stadium	8	Danny Frisella	Atlanta Braves	
5	August 20	Bob Watson	Astrodome	5	John Lamb	Pittsburgh Pirates	

==== Power—speed club ====
20 home runs—50 stolen bases club
Player	AVG	Runs	HR	SB	PSN
César Cedeño	.320	86	25	56	34.6

=== Awards ===
1973 Houston Astros award winners
Name of award		Recipient	Ref.
Gold Glove Award	Shortstop	Roger Metzger	
Gold Glove Award	Third baseman	Doug Rader	
Gold Glove Award	Outfielder	César Cedeño	
Houston Astros Most Valuable Player (MVP)		Roger Metzger	
MLB All-Star Game	Starting center fielder	César Cedeño	
MLB All-Star Game	Reserve outfielder	Bob Watson	
National League (NL) Player of the Week	April 16	Jimmy Wynn	
National League (NL) Player of the Week	May 3	Bob Watson	
The Sporting News NL All-Star	Outfielder	César Cedeño	

Other awards results

Name of award	Voting recipient(s) (Team)	Ref.
NL Most Valuable Player	1st—Rose (CIN) • 11th—Cedeño (HOU); Other Astros: 19th—L. May • 21st—Watson	

=== League leaders ===
==== NL batting leaders ====
- Triples: Roger Metzger (14, led MLB)

==== NL pitching leaders ====
- Bases on balls allowed: Jerry Reuss (117)
- Games started: Jerry Reuss (40)

== Minor league system ==
Level	Team	League	Manager
AAA	Denver Bears	American Association	Jimmy Williams
AA	Columbus Astros	Southern League	Wayne Terwilliger
A	Cedar Rapids Astros	Midwest League	Leo Posada
Rookie	Covington Astros	Appalachian League	Billy Smith

== See also ==
- 20–50 club
- List of Major League Baseball annual triples leaders
