= 1972 Houston Astros season =

Eleventh season in Major League Baseball for the Houston Astros

1972 Houston Astros
- League: National League
- Division: West
- Ballpark: Astrodome
- City: Houston, Texas
- Record: 84–69 (.549)
- Divisional place: 2nd
- Owners: Roy Hofheinz
- General managers: Spec Richardson
- Managers: Harry Walker: 67–54; Salty Parker: 1–0; Leo Durocher: 16–15
- Television: KTRK-TV
- Radio: KPRC (AM) (Gene Elston, Loel Passe)

The 1972 Houston Astros season was the 11th season for the Major League Baseball (MLB) franchise located in Houston, Texas, their eighth as the Astros, 11th in the National League (NL), fourth in the NL West division, and eighth at The Astrodome. The Astros ended the strike-shortened season with a 84-69 record, to secure second place, and 10.5 games behind the National League champion Cincinnati Reds.

The first players' strike in league history occurred on April 1–13, which resulted in nine games being cancelled for Houston. On April 15, Don Wilson made his second Opening Day start for the Astros, who hosted San Francisco. They were shut out by the score of 5–0.

Three managers led the club during the 1972 season: Harry Walker, Salty Parker for one game, and Leo Durocher, who was installed as Walker's permanent replacement. Each represented the fourth, fifth and sixth managers for Houston, with Walker having been the longest-serving manager (708 games) in franchise history. The Astros' first-round draft pick in the amateur draft that year was outfielder Steve Englishbey, at ninth overall. They also selected Jim Crawford in the 14th round.

Center fielder César Cedeño and first baseman Lee May represented the Astros at the MLB All-Star Game. It was the first career selection for Cedeño and third for May. On August 2, Cedeño became the first player in franchise history to hit for the cycle, leading a 10–1 win over the Cincinnati Reds at The Astrodome. This was the first of two cycles that Cedeño hit as a member of the Astros. He also became the second major leaguer to join the 20–50 club, following Lou Brock in 1967.

The Astros concluded that season with a record of 84–69—their first-ever winning season. They also set the franchise record for wins—in second place in the NL West, 10 1/2 games behind the division-champion and NL pennant-winning Reds, and just a percentage point ahead of the Los Angeles Dodgers. It also represented the highest positional finish and fewest games back of first place for the Astros at the time. The next time the Astros finished as high as second place was in 1979, which was also when they set their next club record for wins.

Following the season, Cedeño (first selection) and Doug Rader (third selection) each earned Gold Glove Awards. This was the first time the Astros had more than one Gold Glove Award winner in the same season.

== Offseason ==
- November 29, 1971: Joe Morgan, Ed Armbrister, Jack Billingham, César Gerónimo, and Denis Menke were traded by the Astros to the Cincinnati Reds for Lee May, Tommy Helms, and Jimmy Stewart.
- December 2, 1971: John Mayberry and Dave Grangaard (minors) were traded by the Astros to the Kansas City Royals for Jim York and Lance Clemons.

== Regular season ==
=== Summary ===
==== April ====
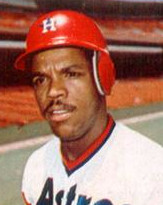
César Cedeño, c. 1977, hit for the cycle and joined the 20–50 club in 1972.

Opening Day starting lineup
Uniform	Player	Position
14	Roger Metzger	Shortstop
28	César Cedeño	Center fielder
24	Jimmy Wynn	Right fielder
23	Lee May	First baseman
27	Bob Watson	Left fielder
12	Doug Rader	Third baseman
19	Tommy Helms	Second baseman
7	Johnny Edwards	Catcher
40	Don Wilson	Pitcher
Venue: Astrodome • San Francisco 5, Houston 0 Sources:

For Opening Day, the Astros hosted the San Francisco Giants. They were defeated via shutout, 5–0, led by Juan Marichal's eight scoreless innings. The Giants did all their damage from the sixth inning on, as Willie McCovey and Tito Fuentes each took Don Wilson deep for home runs. The Astros got eight hits, but were just 1-for-6 with runners in scoring position. Don Wilson made his second Opening Day start for the Astros.

The second day of the season, April 16, saw Giants' Dave Kingman hit for the first cycle at the Astrodome, leading the Giants to a 10–6 pummeling of the Astros. Kingman led all hitters in the game with six runs batted in (RBI), while Bobby Bonds doubled twice, pilfered two bases, and scored four runs. Bob Watson and Tommy Helms each hit three runs blasts for Houston, during the first and fifth innings, respectively.

On April 23, the Astros dazed the Giants with 10-run ninth to prevail, 13–7. César Cedeño stroked five hits with a double and two stolen bases. Bob Watson and Lee May homered. Cedeño even logged his first career five-hit game.

On April 30, the Astros amassed 10 hits and 10 base on balls each in a contest played in 9 innings or fewer for the second time in franchise history. The Colt .45s first did so on September 29, 1963. (Note: The next occurrence of game of this type for the Astros occurred on May 4, 1975. Criteria: For single games, from 1962 to 2026, only 9-inning games or shortened, for HOU, in the regular season, requiring bases on balls ≥ 10 and hits ≥ 10, sorted by ascending date.) Houston topped the St. Louis Cardinals, 7 to 6, spearheaded by right fielder Jimmy Wynn, who thumped his first two doubles of the year and drew two walks. Catcher Johnny Edwards stroked two hits and coaxed two walks. The Astros poked six two-baggers overall, one each added by the quartet of Tommy Helms, César Cedeño, Bob Watson, and Doug Rader. Starter Don Wilson (1–1) hurled 6 1/3 frames to obtain the win, and allowed five runs, with just one charged as earned. Jim Ray relieved, assumed the final 2 2/3 innings, converted the save (2), and added a single. Meanwhile, future Astro José Cruz, joined Jimmy Wynn by collecting his first two doubles of the campaign.

==== May ====
On May 1, Jimmy Wynn's three hits—including a grand slam and a double—keyed a 9–8 triumph over the Pittsburgh Pirates at Three Rivers Stadium. Wynn hit the grand slam in the top of the fifth inning to give Houston a 4–3 lead. The following inning, Johnny Edwards' three-run home run extended Houston's lead to 7–3. However, the Pirates tied the score in the bottom of the sixth inning, capped by Roberto Clemente's first home run of the season. In the top of the ninth, Bob Watson hit and RBI single, and Tommy Helms' sacrifice fly provided the necessary insurance run for victory. César Cedeño added three hits apiece while. Jim Ray (4–0) maintained the edge for the final two innings to obtain the victory.

Bob Watson earned the first monthly accolade in club history, by receiving the National League (NL) Player of the Month Award for May. During this period, Watson slashed .360 / .405 / .620 / 1.025, also accruing six home runs, 20 RBI, and 19 runs scored.

==== June ====
The Philadelphia Phillies hosted "Turn It Around Night" on June 6 at Veterans Stadium, where the theme was doing everything backward, including announcing the lineup cards from bottom to top and holding the seventh-inning stretch in the third inning. Astros starter Dave Roberts followed suit, providing the offense by homering twice to promote his own effort on the mound, as Houston won, 4–3.

With Steve Carlton on the mound for Philadelphia on June 16, the game remained scoreless through extra innings. In the bottom of the 11th inning, Jimmy Wynn connected for a walk-off home run to give the Astros a 1–0 victory. The walk-off blast was the second of Wynn's career, following the same achievement on June 26, 1966.

Starting June 18, Astros starting pitchers hurled back-to-back one-hit shutouts. First, Jerry Reuss led a 10–0 masterpiece over the Phillies, with the only hit surrendered a ninth-inning double by Larry Bowa. César Cedeño collected four hits to power Houston, including a home run and two doubles. Reuss fanned nine, issued four walks, earned the complete game, and game score of 90. At the plate, Reuss drew a walk that led to a run scored. Bob Watson added two doubles and tallied four RBI. Cedeño's four-hit bout was the fourth of his career. The following game, on June 19, Larry Dierker hurled a one-hitter to usher in a 3–0 triumph over the New York Mets, whose only base runner—Duffy Dyer—reached via a third-inning single. Tommy Helms led the Astros' offense with four hits.

Each of the first five Astros' hits on June 26 were home runs, which brought them to a 7–7 tie with the San Diego Padres. San Diego was unable to answer back, however, and Houston kept scoring to win the outcome by a score of 14–7.

César Cedeño followed up Bob Watson's NL Player of the Month honors with a recognition of his own for the month of June. Cedeño powered himself to a .387 average, .452 OBP, .748 SLG, and 1.200 OPS. He scored 27 runs, swatted nine doubles, bashed nine home runs, collected 19 RBI to go along with 43 hits and 83 total bases.

==== MLB All-Star Game ====
Center fielder César Cedeño and first baseman Lee May both earned selection to the MLB All-Star Game, hosted at Atlanta Stadium. Lee, voted a starter for the game, collected a single and an RBI in four trips to the plate. Cedeño substituted for Willie Mays in center field, and delivered a single in the bottom of the sixth. Next, Hank Aaron homered to deep left-center field, scoring Cedeño. In the bottom of the ninth, May hit a ground ball fielder's choice, scoring Billy Williams to pull the National League (NL) into a tie with the American League (AL), 3–3. During the bottom of the tenth, former Astro Joe Morgan laced a walk-off single to score Nate Colbert and give the NL a 4–3 triumph.

Morgan had become the first Astro to be selected as a starter in the 1966 Midsummer Classic, and Lee the second. However, Morgan missed the game due to an injury, allowing Lee to became the first Astro to participate in the starting lineup. Curiously, it was a batted line drive by another Lee Maye on June 25, 1966—albeit with a slightly different spelling—Morgan's then-teammate, that struck him on the knee, fracturing it. Thus, Morgan missed the next 40 games; three days later, it was announced that he was named starter for the All-Star lineup, the first player in Houston franchise history.

==== César Cedeño's cycle ====
At the Astrodome on August 2, Cedeño hit for the cycle to become the first player in franchise history to accomplish that feat. He doubled in the first inning, connected for a home run off Gary Nolan in the third, and singled in the fifth. In the sixth inning, Cedeño grounded out.

Cedeño's final at bat and opportunity to make history arrived in the eighth inning. He stroked a line drive to the right-center field gap for a triple. This effort gave Houston a 10–1 win over the Cincinnati Reds. Cedeño later hit for the cycle almost four years later on August 9, 1976.

Extra-base hits fell frequently for Houston that day, with eight among 16 total safeties. Jimmy Wynn doubled twice, Roger Metzger also tripled, and Lee May added a home run. Meanwhile, Don Wilson (7–7) was masterful on the mound as he scattered six hits and three walks while whiffing six in a complete game effort.

His sixth career contest of four hits or more, and fifth with four RBI—tying his then-career high—Cedeño's batting average jumped to .353. Meanwhile, the Astros trailed Cincinnati by just six games following the contest.

==== Rest of August ====
On August 25, Jimmy Wynn blasted his 200th career home run off Mike Marshall in the bottom of the seventh inning at the Astrodome. A two-run shot, it tied the contest, 3–3, with the Montreal Expos, also scoring César Cedeño. However, Marshall redeemed himself in the top of the ninth, while batting, by doubling home John Boccabella off the Astros' Jim Ray. The hit put Montreal ahead 4–3, and this time, Marshall (14–3) made the lead stand, changing the blown save into a victory.

The Astros, playing their best baseball ever, were desperate to catch the Reds. Following the August 25 loss to Montreal, they fired their longest-tenured manager at the time, Harry Walker, who had the club playing 67–54 (.554) for the season (355–353 (.501) career with Houston), and replaced him for one game with coach Salty Parker (1–0). Following that game, Leo Durocher, having departed the Chicago Cubs earlier in the year, took over for the remainder of the campaign, leading Houston to a 16–15 (.516) result to close out the season.

==== September ====
With a 6–5 defeat of San Diego on September 13, the 77th victory of the season for Houston 77–60 (.562), the Astros clinched their first winning season in franchise annals, due to its abbreviation to 153 games Tom Griffin (3–3) hurled seven innings in relief and fanned 10 to earn the victory to make it a final score of Houston 6, San Diego 5. Lee May collected three hits. Jimmy Wynn scored twice.

On September 17, César Cedeño and Lee May each drove in five to lead Houston as they stormed back to win over Los Angeles Dodgers, 15–11. With Los Angeles leading 10–8 in the seventh, the Astros rallied for four runs, before May's bases-clearing double put the game away. Both clubs piled on 17 hits, led by four each from May, Jim Wynn (Astros), and Bobby Valentine (Dodgers). It was the first 5-RBI game of Cedeño's career, and Lee's eighth (and second of the campaign).

Houston matched the 1969 squad for most wins (81) in franchise annals on September 23, backed by Don Wilson's four-hit effort and Lee May equaling Wilson from the batter's box, to lead a 7–1 defeat of first-place Cincinnati. Wilson (14–9) went the distance, fanning six, and a game score of 89. Jimmy Wynn (23) homered, while May and Tommy Helms each doubled twice.

==== Performance overview ====
By closing the season 84–69, the Astros posted their best-ever record. Among the best and first-time team achievements, the Astros ranked as high as second place in the division, tied with the Los Angeles Dodgers at 10 1/2 games back of Cincinnati, their fewest games ever from first place. Furthermore, it was Houston's first-ever season with a winning record while setting a club record 84 wins, supplanting the 81 wins accomplished in 1969.

This Astros squad led the National League in runs scored (708), the first time in club history doing so, while blasting a club record 134 home runs to surpass the 1970 squad (129), which ranked third in the National League. The 708 runs tallied also ranked second in club history to the 1970 team (744). The 1973 edition followed up by tying the record for home runs, prior to the 1993 iteration (138) taking over the all-time franchise home run lead.

By hitting 22 home runs and collecting 55 stolen bases, Cedeño became the second entrant into the 20 home runs—50 stolen bases club in major league annals, succeeding Lou Brock in 1967. Cedeño became the first Astro to attain 50 stolen bases in 1972, while doing so for a club-record six seasons—each in succession—through 1977. (Note: For single seasons, playing for HOU, in the regular season, requiring stolen bases ≥ 50, sorted by descending stolen bases.) The prior single-season franchise record of 49 steals was set by Sonny Jackson in 1966 and tied by Joe Morgan in 1969. (Note: For single seasons, playing for HOU, in the regular season, requiring stolen bases ≥ 40, sorted by ascending season.)

Cedeño also led the major leagues in doubles (39) (Note: Tied with Willie Montañez of the Philadelphia Phillies.) a second consecutive year, the first Astro to lead in more than one season.

Following the season, third baseman Doug Rader was recognized with his third Gold Glove Award, while Cedeño was likewise recognized for his defense in the outfield. Rader became the first Astro to win a third Gold Glove. Cedeño became the first Astro to win the award for an outfielder. Also, this was the first time in which multiple Astros players won this award.

=== League standings ===
NL West
Team	W	L	Pct.	GB	Home	Road
Cincinnati Reds	95	59	.617	—	42‍–‍34	53‍–‍25
Houston Astros	84	69	.549	10½	41‍–‍36	43‍–‍33
Los Angeles Dodgers	85	70	.548	10½	41‍–‍34	44‍–‍36
Atlanta Braves	70	84	.455	25	36‍–‍41	34‍–‍43
San Francisco Giants	69	86	.445	26½	34‍–‍43	35‍–‍43
San Diego Padres	58	95	.379	36½	26‍–‍54	32‍–‍41

=== Record versus opponents ===
National League

1972 National League record Sources:
Team	ATL	CHC	CIN	HOU	LAD	MON	NYM	PHI	PIT	SD	SF	STL
Atlanta	—	5–7–1	9–9	7–7	7–8	4–8	7–5	6–6	6–6	6–11	7–11	6–6
Chicago	7–5–1	—	8–4	3–9	8–4	10–5	10–8	10–7	3–12	9–3	7–5	10–8
Cincinnati	9–9	4–8	—	11–6	9–5	8–4	8–4	10–2	8–4	8–10	10–5	10–2
Houston	7–7	9–3	6–11	—	7–11	8–4	6–6	9–3	3–9	12–2	13–5	4–8
Los Angeles	8–7	4–8	5–9	11–7	—	6–6	7–5	7–5	7–5	13–5	9–9	8–4
Montreal	8–4	5–10	4–8	4–8	6–6	—	6–12	10–6	6–12	6–6	6–6	9–8
New York	5–7	8–10	4–8	6–6	5–7	12–6	—	13–5	8–6	7–5	8–4	7–9
Philadelphia	6-6	7–10	2–10	3–9	5–7	6–10	5–13	—	5–13	6–6	6–6	8–7
Pittsburgh	6–6	12–3	4–8	9–3	5–7	12–6	6–8	13–5	—	10–2	9–3	10–8
San Diego	11–6	3–9	10–8	2–12	5–13	6–6	5–7	6–6	2–10	—	4–10	4–8
San Francisco	11–7	5–7	5–10	5–13	9–9	6–6	4–8	6–6	3–9	10–4	—	5–7
St. Louis	6–6	8–10	2–10	8–4	4–8	8–9	9–7	7–8	8–10	8–4	7–5	—

=== Notable transactions ===
- June 6, 1972: Jim Crawford was selected by the Astros in the 14th round of the 1972 Major League Baseball draft.

=== Roster ===
1972 Houston Astros
Roster
Pitchers: 36 Wade Blasingame; 37 Mike Cosgrove; 39 George Culver; 49 Larry Dierker; 43 Ken Forsch; 37 Joe Gibbon; 48 Fred Gladding; 38 Tom Griffin; 45 Jim Ray; 47 Jerry Reuss; 50 J. R. Richard; 15 Dave Roberts; 40 Don Wilson; 42 Jim York	Catchers: 7 Johnny Edwards; 8 Jack Hiatt; 10 Larry Howard; 6 Cliff Johnson; 9 Bob Stinson; Infielders: 18 Bobby Fenwick; 19 Tommy Helms; 23 Lee May; 14 Roger Metzger; 12 Doug Rader; 8 Gary Sutherland	Outfielders: 22 Jesús Alou; 28 César Cedeño; 29 Rich Chiles; 21 Norm Miller; 11 Jimmy Stewart; 27 Bob Watson; 24 Jimmy Wynn	Manager: 2 Leo Durocher; 2 Salty Parker; 25 Harry Walker; Coaches: 4 Buddy Hancken; 3 Hub Kittle; 5 Jim Owens; 2 Salty Parker

== Player statistics ==
Table legend
League leader (Bold: MLB leader)	Team leader	*	Left-handed batter or pitcher
League top ten	Leader in appearances at position	#	Switch hitter

=== Batting ===
Abbreviations key

- ⌖ — primary position
- G — games played
- PA — plate appearances
- AB — at bats
- R — Runs
- H — hits
- 2B — doubles
- HR — home runs
- RBI — runs batted in
- BB — base on balls
- SB — stolen bases
- TB — total bases
- AVG — batting average
- OBP — on-base percentage
- SLG — slugging percentage
- OPS — on-base plus slugging

==== Starters by position ====
Individual batting results
⌖	Player	G	PA	AB	R	H	2B	3B	HR	RBI	SB	BB	SO	TB	AVG	OBP	SLG	OPS
C	Johnny Edwards*	108	392	332	33	89	16	2	5	40	2	50	39	179	.268	.358	.373	.732
1B	Lee May	148	647	592	87	168	31	2	29	98	3	52	**145**	290	.284	.343	.490	.833
2B	Tommy Helms	139	559	518	45	134	20	5	5	60	4	24	27	179	.259	.291	.346	.637
3B	Doug Rader	152	626	553	70	131	24	7	22	90	5	57	120	235	.237	.309	.425	.734
SS	Roger Metzger^{#}	153	715	641	84	142	12	1	2	38	23	60	71	166	.222	.288	.259	.547
LF	Bob Watson	147	616	548	74	171	27	4	16	86	1	53	83	254	.312	.378	.464	.841
CF	César Cedeño	139	625	559	103	179	**39**	8	22	82	55	56	62	300	.320	.385	.537	.921
RF	Jimmy Wynn	145	652	542	117	148	29	3	24	90	17	103	99	255	.273	.389	.470	.860

==== Other batters ====
Individual batting results
Player	G	AB	H	Avg.	HR	RBI
Larry Howard	54	157	35	.223	2	13
Norm Miller*	67	107	26	.243	4	13
Jimmy Stewart^{#}	68	96	21	.219	0	9
Jesús Alou	52	93	29	.312	0	11
Bobby Fenwick	36	50	9	.180	0	4
Bob Stinson^{#}	27	35	6	.171	0	2
Jack Hiatt	10	25	5	.200	0	0
Rich Chiles*	9	11	3	.273	0	2
Gary Sutherland	5	8	1	.125	0	1
Cliff Johnson	5	4	1	.250	0	0

=== Pitching ===
Abbreviations

- W — wins
- L — losses
- ERA — earned run average
- G — games pitched
- GS — games started
- CG — complete games
- ShO — shutouts
- SV — saves
- IP — innings pitched
- SO — strikeouts

==== Starting pitchers ====
Individual pitching results
Player	W	L	ERA	G	GS	CG	ShO	IP	SO
Don Wilson	15	10	2.68	33	33	13	3	228.1	172
Larry Dierker	15	8	3.40	31	31	12	5	214.2	115
Dave Roberts*	12	7	4.50	35	28	7	3	192.0	111
Jerry Reuss*	9	13	4.17	33	30	4	1	192.0	174
Ken Forsch	6	8	3.91	30	24	1	0	156.1	113

==== Other pitchers ====
Individual pitching results
Player	G	IP	W	L	ERA	SO
Tom Griffin	39	94.1	5	4	3.21	83
Mike Cosgrove*	7	13.2	0	1	4.61	7
J.R. Richard	4	6.0	1	0	13.50	8

==== Relief pitchers ====
Individual pitching results
Player	G	W	L	SV	ERA	SO
Fred Gladding	42	5	6	14	2.77	18
Jim Ray	54	10	9	8	4.28	50
George Culver	45	6	2	2	3.05	82
Jim York	26	0	1	0	5.25	25
Wade Blasingame	10	0	0	0	8.64	9
Joe Gibbon*	9	0	0	0	9.82	4

== Awards and achievements ==
=== Offensive achievements ===
==== Grand slams ====
No.	Date	Astros batter	Venue	Inning	Pitcher	Opposing team	Box
1	May 1	Jimmy Wynn	Three Rivers Stadium	5 (Note: Tied score or took lead)	Steve Blass	Pittsburgh Pirates	

==== Hitting for the cycle ====
Date	Player	H / AB	R	1B	2B	3B	HR	BI	Other	Score	Opponent	Box
August 2	César Cedeño	4-for-5	3	5	1	8	3	4	CS	10–1	Cincinnati Reds	
Cedeño: 2B (24) • 3B (5) • HR (15) • RBI (49)

==== Power—speed club ====
20 home runs—50 stolen bases club
Player	AVG	Runs	HR	SB	PSN
César Cedeño	.320	103	22	55	31.4

=== Pitching achievements ===
==== No-hit bid ====
Date	Starting pitcher (IP)	Relief pitcher(s) (IP)	No-hit IP	GS	Catcher	Batter	Final	Opponent	Box
June 18, 1972	Jerry Reuss (9)	—	8	90	Larry Howard	Larry Bowa (Note: First batter of ninth inning.)	10–0	Philadelphia Phillies	
Note: Includes those games started with 7 or more no-hit innings.

=== Awards ===
1972 Houston Astros award winners
Name of award			Recipient	Ref.
Associated Press (AP)	NL All-Star	Outfield	César Cedeño	
Gold Glove Award		Third base	Doug Rader	
Gold Glove Award		Outfield	César Cedeño	
Houston Astros Most Valuable Player (MVP)			César Cedeño	
MLB All-Star Game		Starting first baseman	Lee May	
MLB All-Star Game		Reserve outfielder	César Cedeño	
National League (NL) Player of the Month		May	Bob Watson	
National League (NL) Player of the Month		June	César Cedeño	
The Sporting News	NL All-Star	Outfield	César Cedeño	

Other awards results

Name of award	Voting recipient(s) (Team)	Ref.
NL Most Valuable Player	1st—Bench (CIN) • 6th—Cedeño (HOU) • 9th—L. May (HOU)	

=== League leaders ===
NL batting leaders

- Doubles: César Cedeño (39—led MLB)

NL fielding leaders

- Putouts: Lee May (1,318)

== Minor league system ==
Level	Team	League	Manager
AAA	Oklahoma City 89ers	American Association	Tony Pacheco
AA	Columbus Astros	Southern League	Jackie Brandt
A	Cocoa Astros	Florida State League	Jimmy Williams
Rookie	Covington Astros	Appalachian League	Billy Smith
Rookie	Cocoa Astros	Florida East Coast League	Leo Posada

== See also ==
- 20–50 club
- List of Major League Baseball annual doubles leaders
- List of Major League Baseball annual putouts leaders
- List of Major League Baseball players to hit for the cycle
