= 1972 Los Angeles Dodgers season =

1972 Los Angeles Dodgers
- League: National League
- Division: West
- Ballpark: Dodger Stadium
- City: Los Angeles
- Record: 85–70 (.548)
- Divisional place: 2nd
- Owners: Walter O'Malley, James Mulvey
- President: Peter O'Malley
- General managers: Al Campanis
- Managers: Walter Alston
- Television: KTTV (11)
- Radio: KFI; Vin Scully, Jerry Doggett; KWKW; Jose Garcia, Jaime Jarrín

The 1972 Los Angeles Dodgers season was the 83rd season for the Los Angeles Dodgers franchise in Major League Baseball (MLB), their 15th season in Los Angeles, California, and their 11th season playing their home games at Dodger Stadium in Los Angeles California. The Dodgers finished the season 85–70, good for a tie for second place with the Astros in the National League West. This was the first season where the players' last names appeared on the back of the uniforms.

== Offseason ==
- October 21: Tommy Hutton was traded by the Dodgers to the Philadelphia Phillies for Larry Hisle.
- October 22, 1971: Bobby Darwin was traded by the Dodgers to the Minnesota Twins for Paul Powell.
- October 24, 1971: Maury Wills was released by the Dodgers.
- December 2, 1971: Doyle Alexander, Bob O'Brien, Sergio Robles and Royle Stillman were traded by the Dodgers to the Baltimore Orioles for Frank Robinson and Pete Richert.
- December 2, 1971: Dick Allen was traded by the Dodgers to the Chicago White Sox for Tommy John and Steve Huntz.
- December 2, 1971: Tom Haller was traded by the Dodgers to the Detroit Tigers for a player to be named later and cash. The Tigers completed the deal by sending Bernie Beckman (minors) to the Dodgers on March 31, 1972.
- December 17, 1971: Chris Cannizzaro was claimed off waivers by the Dodgers from the Chicago Cubs.
- March 27, 1972: Bill Sudakis was claimed off waivers from the Dodgers by the New York Mets.

== Regular season ==
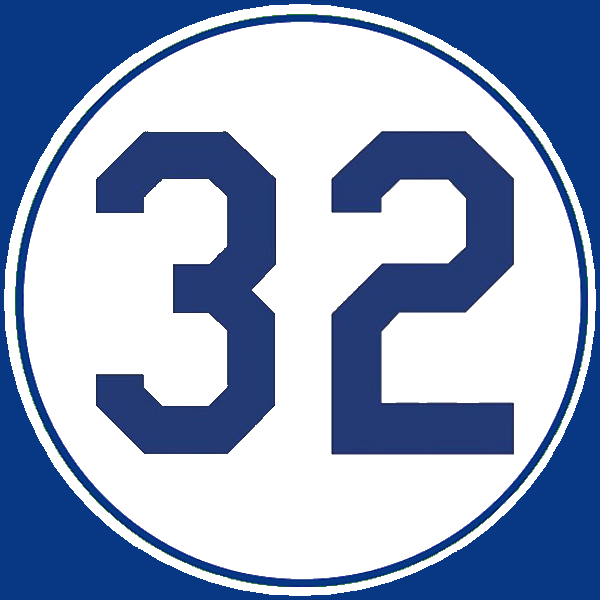
Sandy Koufax's number 32 was retired by the Los Angeles Dodgers in 1972.

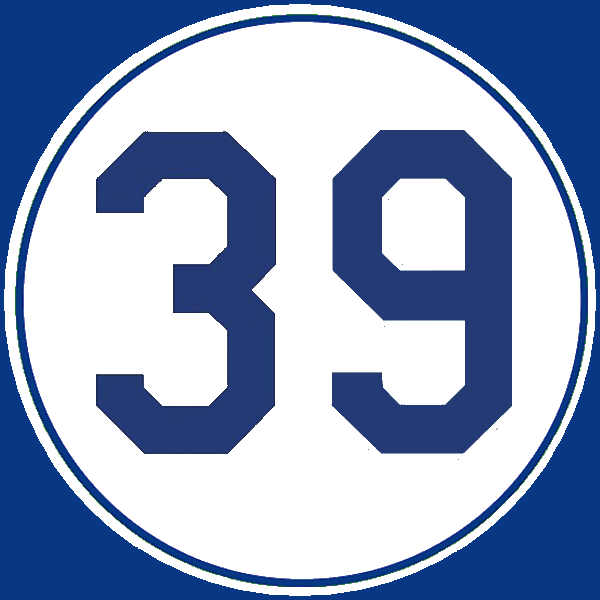
Roy Campanella's number 39 was retired by the Los Angeles Dodgers in 1972.

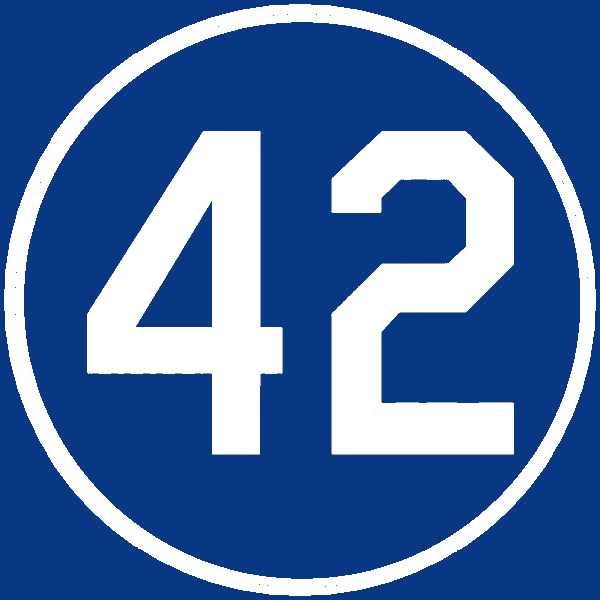
Jackie Robinson's number 42 was retired by the Los Angeles Dodgers in 1972.

=== Season standings ===
NL West
Team	W	L	Pct.	GB	Home	Road
Cincinnati Reds	95	59	.617	—	42‍–‍34	53‍–‍25
Houston Astros	84	69	.549	10½	41‍–‍36	43‍–‍33
Los Angeles Dodgers	85	70	.548	10½	41‍–‍34	44‍–‍36
Atlanta Braves	70	84	.455	25	36‍–‍41	34‍–‍43
San Francisco Giants	69	86	.445	26½	34‍–‍43	35‍–‍43
San Diego Padres	58	95	.379	36½	26‍–‍54	32‍–‍41

=== Record vs. opponents ===
1972 National League record Sources:
Team	ATL	CHC	CIN	HOU	LAD	MON	NYM	PHI	PIT	SD	SF	STL
Atlanta	—	5–7–1	9–9	7–7	7–8	4–8	7–5	6–6	6–6	6–11	7–11	6–6
Chicago	7–5–1	—	8–4	3–9	8–4	10–5	10–8	10–7	3–12	9–3	7–5	10–8
Cincinnati	9–9	4–8	—	11–6	9–5	8–4	8–4	10–2	8–4	8–10	10–5	10–2
Houston	7–7	9–3	6–11	—	7–11	8–4	6–6	9–3	3–9	12–2	13–5	4–8
Los Angeles	8–7	4–8	5–9	11–7	—	6–6	7–5	7–5	7–5	13–5	9–9	8–4
Montreal	8–4	5–10	4–8	4–8	6–6	—	6–12	10–6	6–12	6–6	6–6	9–8
New York	5–7	8–10	4–8	6–6	5–7	12–6	—	13–5	8–6	7–5	8–4	7–9
Philadelphia	6-6	7–10	2–10	3–9	5–7	6–10	5–13	—	5–13	6–6	6–6	8–7
Pittsburgh	6–6	12–3	4–8	9–3	5–7	12–6	6–8	13–5	—	10–2	9–3	10–8
San Diego	11–6	3–9	10–8	2–12	5–13	6–6	5–7	6–6	2–10	—	4–10	4–8
San Francisco	11–7	5–7	5–10	5–13	9–9	6–6	4–8	6–6	3–9	10–4	—	5–7
St. Louis	6–6	8–10	2–10	8–4	4–8	8–9	9–7	7–8	8–10	8–4	7–5	—

=== Opening Day lineup ===
Opening Day starters
Name	Position
Maury Wills	Shortstop
Bill Buckner	First baseman
Willie Davis	Center fielder
Frank Robinson	Right fielder
Jim Lefebvre	Second baseman
Willie Crawford	Left fielder
Duke Sims	Catcher
Billy Grabarkewitz	Third baseman
Don Sutton	Starting pitcher

=== Notable transactions ===
- April 14, 1972: Dick Dietz was claimed off waivers by the Dodgers from the San Francisco Giants.

=== Roster ===
1972 Los Angeles Dodgers
Roster
Pitchers: 21 Jim Brewer; 44 Al Downing; 49 Charlie Hough; 25 Tommy John; 46 Pete Mikkelsen; 23 Claude Osteen; 29 José Peña; 16 Ron Perranoski; 31 Doug Rau; 45 Pete Richert; 40 Bill Singer; 37 Mike Strahler; 20 Don Sutton; 31 Hoyt Wilhelm	Catchers: 14 Chris Cannizzaro; 16,8 Dick Dietz; 13 Joe Ferguson; 8 Duke Sims; 41 Steve Yeager; Infielders: 10 Ron Cey; 6 Steve Garvey; 1 Billy Grabarkewitz; 34 Lee Lacy; 5 Jim Lefebvre; 15 Davey Lopes; 9 Terry McDermott; 17 Tom Paciorek; 28 Wes Parker; 18 Bill Russell; 2 Bobby Valentine; 30 Maury Wills	Outfielders: 22 Bill Buckner; 27 Willie Crawford; 3 Willie Davis; 11 Manny Mota; 36 Frank Robinson	Manager: 24 Walter Alston; Coaches: 26 Red Adams; 52 Carroll Beringer; 19 Jim Gilliam; 7 Roy Hartsfield; 33 Danny Ozark; 51 Dixie Walker

== Player stats ==
=== Batting ===
==== Starters by position ====
Note: Pos = Position; G = Games played; AB = At bats; H = Hits; Avg. = Batting average; HR = Home runs; RBI = Runs batted in

Pos	Player	G	AB	H	Avg.	HR	RBI
C	Chris Cannizzaro	73	200	48	.240	2	18
1B	Wes Parker	130	427	119	.279	4	59
2B	Lee Lacy	60	243	63	.259	0	12
SS	Bill Russell	129	434	118	.272	4	34
3B	Steve Garvey	96	294	79	.269	9	30
LF	Manny Mota	118	371	120	.323	5	48
CF	Willie Davis	149	615	178	.289	19	79
RF	Frank Robinson	103	342	86	.251	19	59

==== Other batters ====
Note: G = Games played; AB = At bats; H = Hits; Avg. = Batting average; HR = Home runs; RBI = Runs batted in

Player	G	AB	H	Avg.	HR	RBI
Bobby Valentine	119	391	107	.274	3	32
Bill Buckner	105	383	122	.319	5	37
Willie Crawford	96	243	61	.251	8	27
Jim Lefebvre	70	169	34	.201	5	24
Duke Sims	51	151	29	.192	2	11
Billy Grabarkewitz	53	144	24	.167	4	16
Maury Wills	71	132	17	.129	0	4
Steve Yeager	35	106	29	.274	4	15
Dick Dietz	27	56	9	.161	1	6
Tom Paciorek	11	47	12	.255	1	6
Davey Lopes	11	42	9	.214	0	1
Ron Cey	11	37	10	.270	1	3
Joe Ferguson	8	24	7	.292	1	5
Terry McDermott	9	23	3	.130	0	0

=== Pitching ===
==== Starting pitchers ====
Note: G = Games pitched; IP = Innings pitched; W = Wins; L = Losses; ERA = Earned run average; SO = Strikeouts

Player	G	IP	W	L	ERA	SO
Don Sutton	33	272.2	19	9	2.08	207
Claude Osteen	33	252.0	20	11	2.64	100
Al Downing	31	202.2	9	9	2.98	117
Tommy John	29	186.2	11	5	2.89	117
Bill Singer	26	169.1	6	16	3.67	101

==== Other pitchers ====
Note: G = Games pitched; IP = Innings pitched; W = Wins; L = Losses; ERA = Earned run average; SO = Strikeouts

Player	G	IP	W	L	ERA	SO
Doug Rau	7	32.2	2	2	2.20	19

==== Relief pitchers ====
Note: G = Games pitched; W = Wins; L = Losses; SV = Saves; ERA = Earned run average; SO = Strikeouts

Player	G	W	L	SV	ERA	SO
Jim Brewer	51	8	7	17	1.26	69
Pete Richert	37	2	3	6	2.25	38
Pete Mikkelsen	33	5	5	5	4.06	41
Mike Strahler	19	1	2	0	3.26	25
Hoyt Wilhelm	16	0	1	1	4.62	9
Ron Perranoski	9	2	0	0	2.70	5
José Peña	5	0	0	0	8.59	4
Charlie Hough	2	0	0	0	3.38	4

== Awards and honors ==
- NL Player of the Month
  - Don Sutton (April 1972)

=== All-Stars ===
- 1972 Major League Baseball All-Star Game
  - Don Sutton reserve
- Gold Glove Awards
  - Wes Parker
  - Willie Davis

== Farm system ==
Level	Team	League	Manager
**AAA**	**Albuquerque Dukes**	**Pacific Coast League**	**Tommy Lasorda**
**AA**	**El Paso Dodgers**	**Texas League**	**Monty Basgall**; **Stan Wasiak**
A	Bakersfield Dodgers	California League	Don LeJohn
A	Daytona Beach Dodgers	Florida State League	Stan Wasiak; Bob Shaw
A-Short Season	Spokane Indians	Northwest League	Bill Berrier
Rookie	Ogden Dodgers	Pioneer League	Gail Henley

Teams in BOLD won League Championships

== 1972 Major League Baseball draft ==
This was the eighth year of a Major League Baseball draft. The Dodgers drafted 42 players in the June draft and eight in the January draft. Six players would eventually play in MLB.

This was a weak draft class whose most notable player was Dennis Lewallyn, a pitcher who played for the Dodgers and two other teams from 1975 to 1981 with a 4–4 record and 4.48 ERA. The top draft pick was shortstop John Harbin from Newberry College who played in only 83 games in the Dodgers farm system in 1972 and was quickly out of baseball.

1972 draft picks

=== January draft ===
Round	Name	Position	School	Signed	Career span	Highest level
1	John Adams	RHP		Yes	1972–1974	A
2	Tim Hosler	OF	South Georgia College	No		
3	Allen Polofsky	LHP	Miami Dade College	No		

==== January secondary phase ====
Round	Name	Position	School	Signed	Career span	Highest level
1	Dennis Lewallyn	RHP	Chipola College	Yes	1972–1987	**MLB**
2	James Van Der Beek	RHP	Lafayette College	Yes	1972–1976	AAA
3	Francis Sansosti	RHP	Community College of Baltimore County	No; Cardinals-1975	1975	A
4	Mike Siani	SS	Villanova University	No		
5	Robert Sans	1B	Texas A&M University	Yes	1972	A

=== June draft ===
Round	Name	Position	School	Signed	Career span	Highest level
1	John Harbin	SS	Newberry College	Yes	1972	A-
2	Cleo Smith	1B	Ells High School	Yes	1972–1979	AAA
3	Bob Detherage	RHP	Hillcrest High School	Yes	1973–1981	**MLB**
4	Larry Corrigan	C	Iowa State University	Yes	1973–1978	AAA
5	Mitchell Bobinger	LHP	Chico High School	Yes	1972–1978	AAA
6	Alton Torregano	C	University of Louisiana at Lafayette	Yes	1972–1973	A
7	James Fleming	SS	St. Peter's High School	Yes	1973–1976	AA
8	Stephen Plut	OF	St. Francis High School	No; Angels – 1975	1975–1978	AA
9	Robert Stewart	RHP	Magnolia High School	Yes	1972–1977	AA
10	William Kooyman	3B	Saint Mary's College of California	Yes	1972–1974	A
11	Terry Zorger	3B	Huntington University	Yes	1972–1973	A-
12	Jere Nolan	OF	University of California, Berkeley	Yes	1972–1974	AA
13	Hank Boguszewski	RHP	Glen Cove High School	No		
14	Michael Rushde	OF	Fontana High School	Yes	1972–1977	AA
15	Jason Thompson	LHP	Apple Valley High School	Yes	1975–1986	**MLB**
16	Douglas Schaefer	RHP	Lindbergh High School	No; Giants-1975	1975–1981	AAA
17	Glenn Burke	OF	Merritt College	Yes	1972–1980	**MLB**
18	Richard Magner	C	Rollins College	Yes	1972–1977	AAA
19	Leonard Wouters	RHP	Hampton Bays High School	Yes	1972–1976	A
20	John Littlefield	RHP	Azusa High School	No; Cardinals-1976	1976–1982	AAA
21	John Freedman	3B	Claremont High School	No	1974	A-
22	Richard Jacobs	LHP	University of Oklahoma	No		
23	Dale Forchetti	SS	Neshaminy High School	No		
24	Don Redoglia	SS	Pasadena City College	No; Cardinals-1975	1975	A
25	Kenneth Smith	OF	Jefferson High School	No		
26	Buff White	LHP	Folsom High School	No		
27	David Rothermel	3B	Hillcrest High School	No		
28	Steven O'Brien	RHP	Maryvale High School	Yes	1972–1977	AAA
29	Samuel Roberts	1B	Tennessee High School	No		
30	Brian Felda	OF	University of Wisconsin–Oshkosh	Yes	1972–1975	A
31	Michael Parnow	2B	College of Marin	Yes	1972–1973	A-
32	James Fiack	C	University of California, Davis	Yes	1972–1973	A
33	Charles Walker	OF	Atlanta Baptist College	Yes	1972	A-
34	Jeff Chandler	LHP	Davis High School	No; Reds-1973	1973–1978	AA
35	Craig Minetto	LHP	Amos Alonzo Stagg High School	No; Expos-1974	1974–1984	**MLB**
36	David Baker	C	Pacific High School	No; Phillies-1975	1975–1976	AA
37	Tom Haley	C	Binger High School	No		
38	Bob Shirley	LHP	Putnam City High School	No; Padres-1976	1976–1988	**MLB**
39	Timothy Lewis	LHP	Germantown Academy	No; Yankees-1976	1976–1981	AAA

==== June secondary phase ====
Round	Name	Position	School	Signed	Career span	Highest level
1	Robert Lesslie	RHP	Kansas State University	Yes	1972–1977	AAA
2	Walter Rzepiennik	RHP	Community College of Baltimore	Yes	1972–1974	A
3	Robin Ogle	1B	Miami-Dade College	No; Padres-1975	1975	A-
