= Billy Grabarkewitz =

American baseball player (born 1946)

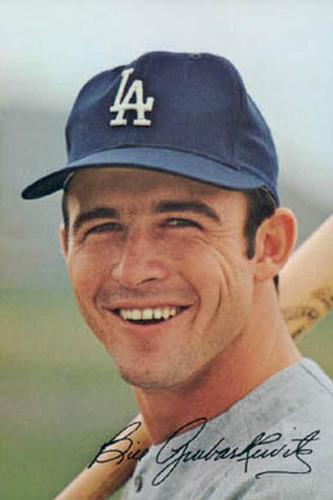
- Third baseman / Second baseman
- Born: January 18, 1946 (age 80); Lockhart, Texas, U.S.
- Batted: Right Threw: Right

MLB debut
- April 22, 1969, for the Los Angeles Dodgers

Last MLB appearance
- April 25, 1975, for the Oakland Athletics

MLB statistics
- Batting average: .236
- Home runs: 28
- Runs batted in: 141
- Stats at Baseball Reference

Teams
- Los Angeles Dodgers (1969–1972); California Angels (1973); Philadelphia Phillies (1973–1974); Chicago Cubs (1974); Oakland Athletics (1975)

Career highlights and awards
- All-Star (1970)

Billy Cordell Grabarkewitz (born January 18, 1946) is an American former professional baseball infielder, who played seven years in Major League Baseball (MLB).

== Early years ==
Grabarkewitz lettered in baseball, basketball, football, golf and track at Alamo Heights High School, and in 1963, he played for the now defunct Sagamore Clouters of the Cape Cod Baseball League. After high school, he attended St. Mary's University in nearby San Antonio, Texas for two years before being selected by the Los Angeles Dodgers in the twelfth round of the 1966 Major League Baseball draft.

Grabarkewitz immediately impressed in his first professional season. The second baseman clubbed eleven home runs and scored a Northwest League leading 62 runs for the Duke Snider led Tri-City Atoms to lead the team to its second straight title. In 1967, Grabarkewitz was shifted to shortstop with the California League's Santa Barbara Dodgers, and continued to impress with his bat. He led his club with 24 home runs, and his 122 runs scored were nearly double his nearest competitor. In 1968, Grabarkewitz won the "Fastest Dodger in Spring training", beating out Willie Davis, Bill Russell and Bobby Valentine. After beginning the season with the Texas League's Albuquerque Dodgers, Grabarkewitz was slated to join the Dodgers on August 3, when he broke his ankle & leg in six places in a home plate collision the very day he was to be called up. According to Dodgers orthopedist, Dr. Frank Jobe, the injury was so severe he likely would not ever play again.

All told, Grabarkewitz batted .283 with 48 home runs, 157 runs batted in and 287 runs scored over his minor league career when he made his major league debut with the Dodgers on April 22, 1969. Grabarkewitz was given the opportunity to earn the Dodgers' starting shortstop job, but struggled in that role. He was batting .120 with five RBIs and no home runs when the Dodgers reacquired Dodgers legend Maury Wills from the Montreal Expos for Ron Fairly and Paul Popovich on June 11. Shortly afterwards, Grabarkewitz was reassigned to the triple A Spokane Indians of the Pacific Coast League, where he played all over the infield. He returned to the majors in late July, and was hitless in fifteen at bats through the rest of the season.

== Los Angeles Dodgers ==
Grabarkewitz began the 1970 season at second base, but shifted over to third when Steve Garvey was demoted to Spokane. Following a 2-for-3 performance against the San Francisco Giants on May 17, Grabarkewitz's batting average peaked at a season high of .420, and earned him serious consideration as a write-in candidate for the 1970 Major League Baseball All-Star Game. Though his campaign was unsuccessful (the Cincinnati Reds' Tony Pérez was elected), National League manager Gil Hodges selected Grabarkewitz as one of his reserve position players. Grabarkewitz entered the game in the seventh inning, and hit a two out single in the bottom of the twelfth inning that set up the infamous Pete Rose/Ray Fosse collision at the plate.

Grabarkewitz's batting average was .341 at the time of the All-Star game, and he was embroiled in a battle for the NL batting crown with Rico Carty and Roberto Clemente. However, he batted only .232 over the remainder of the season, and ended the season with a .289 average. Regardless, he led the Dodgers with a .399 on-base percentage and seventeen home runs, and tied with Willie Davis for a team leading 92 runs scored. He also set a Dodgers franchise record by striking out 149 times. And, per Dr. Frank Jobe, “led the league in x-rays”.

During the off season, the Dodgers dealt second baseman Ted Sizemore and minor league catcher Bob Stinson to the St. Louis Cardinals for third baseman Dick Allen with the intention of shifting Grabarkewitz back to second. Unfortunately, a Spring training arm injury limited Grabarkewitz's services to start the season, and caused him to miss the entire month of August. He appeared in 44 games in 1971, mostly as a pinch hitter or pinch runner, and batted .225 with six RBIs and no home runs. Similarly, injuries limited Grabarkewitz to 53 games and a .167 average in 1972. After the season, he was traded with Hall of Famer Frank Robinson, Bill Singer, Mike Strahler and Bobby Valentine to the California Angels for Ken McMullen and Andy Messersmith.

== California Angels ==
The Angels used Grabarkewitz at second, third and short, and even tried him in the outfield and the newly formed designated hitter position, however, the shoulder and ankle problems continued, as Grabarkewitz's average never climbed above .200 after April.

== Philadelphia Phillies ==
Grabarkewitz's contract was sold by the Angels to the Philadelphia Phillies on August 14, 1973 in a transaction that was completed four months later at the Winter Meetings on December 6 when Denny Doyle was sent to California for Aurelio Monteagudo and Chris Coletta. Returning to the National League seemed to rejuvenate him. He appeared in 25 of the Phillies' final 41 games, mostly at second, and batted .288. However, during the off season, the Phillies acquired Dave Cash from the Pittsburgh Pirates. With All-Stars Cash, Larry Bowa and Mike Schmidt around Philadelphia's infield, Grabarkewitz saw very little playing time in 1974. He was used exclusively as a pinch hitter or pinch runner to start off the season, and didn't need his glove at all until the 45th game of the season. With his average at .133 with one home run and two RBIs, Grabarkewitz went to the Chicago Cubs midway through the season for cash considerations.

== Chicago Cubs ==
The Cubs were battling injuries, and had something of a revolving door at second base until Grabarkewitz's arrival. He took over the job, and batted a respectable .248 over the rest of the season while also playing some short. His only home run as a Cub came against the Phillies on July 26. Once again Grabarkewitz saw his club acquire a young prospect second baseman when the Cubs received Manny Trillo from the Oakland Athletics in a package for Billy Williams.

== Oakland A's ==
Grabarkewitz was released during Spring training 1975, and joined his friend Williams with Oakland two days before the season started. He spent most of the season with Oakland, but appeared in only his sixth game before breaking his ribs and shoulder from a collision with the Kansas City Royals' Hal McRae. He was assigned to the Pacific Coast League's Tucson Toros to rehab. He batted .279 with eight home runs and forty RBIs for Tucson but he never recovered from his injuries. He was credited service for the entire 1975 ML season with Oakland and retired at seasons end.

== Career statistics ==
Games	PA	AB	Runs	Hits	2B	3B	HR	RBI	SB	BB	SO	HBP	Avg.	Slg.	Fld%
466	1390	1161	189	274	41	12	28	141	33	202	321	10	.236	.364	.960

Grabarkewitz was part of a core of young Dodgers prospects that became known as "The Mod Squad" after the popular TV series of the same name, and appeared on the cover of the May 19, 1969 edition of Sports Illustrated, along with his fellow Mod Squad members. In 1977, he became an independent life insurance agent in San Antonio. In 2000, Grabarkewitz founded Southwest Marketing Alliance in Dallas, Texas, and now has over 1,200 agents in his national hierarchy. He resides in Colleyville, Texas and Hilton Head, South Carolina.
