= Rafael Batista =

Dominican baseball player (1945-2008)

- First baseman
- Born: November 12, 1945; San Pedro de Macorís, Dominican Republic
- Died: October 25, 2008 (aged 62); Santo Domingo, Dominican Republic
- Batted: Left Threw: Left

MLB debut
- June 17, 1973, for the Houston Astros

Last MLB appearance
- April 27, 1975, for the Houston Astros

MLB statistics
- Batting average: .280
- Home runs: 0
- Runs batted in: 2
- Stats at Baseball Reference

Teams
- Houston Astros (1973, 1975); Lotte Orions (1975)

Rafael Batista Sánchez (November 12, 1945 – October 25, 2008) was a Dominican first baseman in Major League Baseball. He was born in San Pedro de Macorís, Dominican Republic.

Batista was signed by the Milwaukee Braves as an amateur free agent before the 1965 season, and drafted by the Houston Astros from the Atlanta Braves in the 1967 minor league draft (November 28, 1967). He played for the Astros in 1973 and 1975.

During his two short stints with Houston, he got into a total of 22 games, mostly as a pinch hitter. He batted .280 (7–for–25) and was excellent in the field. In eight appearances at first base he recorded twenty-six putouts, one assist, no errors, and participated in one double play. In his one big league start (July 2, 1973 at the Astrodome) he went 0–for–4 against San Diego Padres starter and winner Clay Kirby. He later was acquired by the Cafeteros de Córdoba of the Mexican League before the 1976 season, and never again played in the Major Leagues.

Batista died in Santo Domingo, Dominican Republic, at the age of 62.
