= Bill Sudakis =

American baseball player (1946–2021)

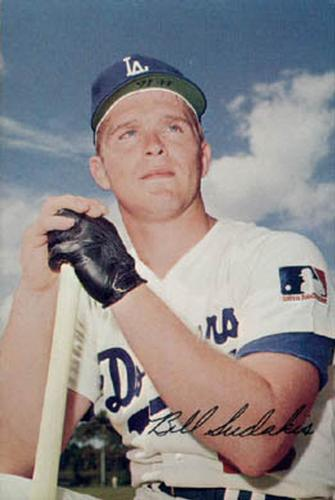
- Third baseman
- Born: March 27, 1946; Joliet, Illinois, U.S.
- Died: September 15, 2021 (aged 75); Palm Springs, California, U.S.
- Batted: Switch Threw: Right

MLB debut
- September 3, 1968, for the Los Angeles Dodgers

Last MLB appearance
- August 7, 1975, for the Cleveland Indians

MLB statistics
- Batting average: .234
- Home runs: 59
- Runs batted in: 214
- Stats at Baseball Reference

Teams
- Los Angeles Dodgers (1968–1971); New York Mets (1972); Texas Rangers (1973); New York Yankees (1974); California Angels (1975); Cleveland Indians (1975)

William Paul Sudakis (/suˈdeɪkɪs/ soo-DAY-kis; March 27, 1946 – September 15, 2021) was an American Major League Baseball infielder. He was primarily a third baseman, but also appeared as a catcher and first baseman.

== Early years ==
During his senior year at Joliet Township High School in 1964, Sudakis signed with the Los Angeles Dodgers. He fared poorly in his first professional season with the Pioneer League's Pocatello Chiefs, batting just .214 with one home run and twelve runs batted in with an .843 fielding percentage at third base. The Dodgers experimented with Sudakis all over the infield during his next three seasons in the minors. Sudakis developed into a power-hitting switch hitter, clubbing 23 home runs for the Santa Barbara Dodgers in 1966, and in 1968 he batted .294 with sixteen home runs and 75 RBIs for the Albuquerque Dodgers to earn Texas League co-MVP honors.

== Los Angeles Dodgers ==
Later that year, Sudakis made his major league debut as a September call-up and immediately took over the starting third base job over incumbent Bob Bailey. He hit a home run in his first game, a come-from-behind victory over the Philadelphia Phillies, and led the Dodgers to a 3–0 victory over the St. Louis Cardinals with a first-inning two-run home run on September 21.

In his rookie season of 1969, Sudakis clubbed fourteen home runs (second on the team to right fielder Andy Kosco), four of which came in consecutive games from August 15 through 19. He was the last and youngest Dodgers rookie to hit home runs in four consecutive games until Joc Pederson did so in 2015.

In 1970, with rookie prospects Steve Garvey and Billy Grabarkewitz joining a crowded Dodgers infield, Manager Walter Alston experimented with Sudakis at catcher. The idea was seemingly abandoned in mid May, until the second game of an August 15 doubleheader against the Chicago Cubs. Sudakis appeared in 38 games behind the plate that season, throwing out just 6% of would-be base stealers (2 of 32). He had one of his better seasons with the bat, however, matching his previous season's home run total in nearly 200 fewer plate appearances. His .264 batting average was also a career high.

Dogged by bad knees, Sudakis was limited to just 41 games and a .193 average in 1971. He was placed on waivers during spring training of 1972, and was selected by the New York Mets on his 26th birthday. His knees kept him off the field until July 11, and prompted the Mets to use him mostly at first base. He appeared in only 18 games for the Mets, batting just .143 with one home run.

== Texas Rangers ==
During spring training 1973, the Texas Rangers acquired Sudakis from the Mets for minor league journeyman Bill McNulty. Though he appeared in just 82 games for the Rangers (mostly at first and third), he hit a career-high fifteen home runs. The designated hitter was introduced in the American League in 1973, a position Sudakis seemed ideally suited for. However, he made nine appearances at DH, and batted just .111 with two RBIs. Following the season, his contract was purchased by the New York Yankees.

== New York Yankees ==
The Yankees platooned Sudakis at DH with left-handed hitter Ron Blomberg and used him as backup for Chris Chambliss at first base; he also appeared at third on occasion and made one appearance behind the plate. Following a 10–0 victory over the Cleveland Indians on September 29, the Yankees' flight to Milwaukee for a two-game set against the Brewers to end the season was delayed three hours. Upon arrival at the Pfister Towers Hotel in Milwaukee, Sudakis and back up catcher Rick Dempsey got into a fight in the hotel lobby. The fight was broken up by fellow catcher Thurman Munson, among others. Dave Pagan, Walt Williams and All-Star Bobby Murcer were all injured in the altercation, and Sudakis did not appear in either of the final two games of the season.

== California Angels and Cleveland Indians ==
The Yankees traded Sudakis to the California Angels for Skip Lockwood at the Winter Meetings on December 3, 1974.

Sudakis appeared in thirty games for the Angels, batting just .121 with one home run before he was released in late June. He immediately signed with the Indians, but fared only slightly better. In 1976, he played for the Omaha Royals of the American Association in the Kansas City Royals system, but could not make it back to the major leagues.

== Career statistics ==
Games	PA	AB	Runs	Hits	2B	3B	HR	RBI	SB	BB	SO	HBP	Avg.	Slg.	Fld%	CS%
530	1751	1548	177	362	56	7	59	214	9	172	313	7	.234	.393	.970	18%

He was part of a core of young Dodgers prospects that became known as "The Mod Squad" after the popular TV series of the same name, and appeared on the cover of the May 19, 1969 edition of Sports Illustrated, along with his fellow Mod Squad members. From 1971 on, Sudakis caught 32% of potential base stealers (9 of 28) over the remainder of his career.

== Personal life ==
Sudakis was of Lithuanian descent.

On September 27, 1985, Sudakis and Theodore Earl Turina were arrested on cocaine possession charges by undercover narcotics officers. $200,000 worth of cocaine was recovered at their Huntington Beach residence. Orange County Sheriff's Lieutenant Tom Conner said that Sudakis was armed with a handgun at the time of the arrest and that a second weapon was also seized. Conner said authorities plan to pursue charges for possession of handguns.

Sudakis died on September 15, 2021.
