= César Cedeño =

Dominican baseball player (born 1951)

- Cedeño, c. 1980
- Center fielder
- Born: February 25, 1951 (age 75); Santo Domingo, Dominican Republic
- Batted: Right Threw: Right

MLB debut
- June 20, 1970, for the Houston Astros

Last MLB appearance
- June 2, 1986, for the Los Angeles Dodgers

MLB statistics
- Batting average: .285
- Hits: 2,087
- Home runs: 199
- Runs batted in: 976
- Stolen bases: 550
- Stats at Baseball Reference

Teams
- Houston Astros (1970–1981); Cincinnati Reds (1982–1985); St. Louis Cardinals (1985); Los Angeles Dodgers (1986)

Career highlights and awards
- 4× All-Star (1972–1974, 1976); 5× Gold Glove Award (1972–1976); Houston Astros Hall of Fame

César Cedeño Encarnación (born February 25, 1951) is a Dominican former professional baseball player and coach. He played in Major League Baseball as a center fielder from 1970 to 1986, most prominently as a member of the Houston Astros where he helped the franchise win its first-ever National League Western Division title and postseason berth in 1980.

The four-time All-Star player combined speed and power to become one of the best all around players of his era. Cedeño set the standards for major league outfielders in the early 1970s by winning five consecutive Gold Glove Awards between 1972 and 1976. He became only the second player in Major League Baseball history to hit 20 home runs and steal 50 bases in one season, and the only major leaguer to do so in three consecutive seasons. He also played for the Cincinnati Reds, St. Louis Cardinals and the Los Angeles Dodgers.

After his playing career, Cedeño spent several years as a minor league hitting coach for the Astros and Nationals organizations. In 2020, Cedeño was inducted into the Houston Astros Hall of Fame. Cedeño still holds the Astros team record for career stolen bases more than 40 years after last playing for the team.

== Baseball career ==
=== Houston Astros ===
César Cedeño in 1970 card for Astros

Signed by Houston as an amateur free agent in 1967, Cedeño debuted on June 20, 1970, at 19 years of age. His .310 batting average in his rookie season in 1970, allowed him to finish 4th in the Rookie of the Year voting. The next season, he led the major leagues in doubles. On September 2 of that year, he hit an unusual home run: against the Los Angeles Dodgers in the Astrodome, with the bases loaded, he hit a blooper that dropped between the right fielder and second baseman, who collided with one another as the ball rolled away; Cedeno and the rest of his teammates scurried quickly to reach home plate for an inside-the-park grand slam. The following season, his third, he again led in doubles, not just his league, but in the majors. He batted .320 in both 1972 and 1973. In 1972, Cedeño hit 22 home runs, had 55 stolen bases, and again led the league in doubles. He won a Gold Glove Award that season as well. Houston manager Leo Durocher once compared Cedeño to Willie Mays, saying "At 22 Cedeño is as good or better than Willie was at the same age".

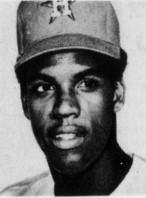
Cedeño, circa 1973

Possessing a rare combination of power, blazing speed, and good defense, Cedeño became the second man in Major League history (after Lou Brock in 1967) to join the 20–50 club, hitting 20 home runs and stealing 50 bases in the same season. He accomplished the feat three years in a row (1972–1974), making him the only player in major league history to do so. Further, he stole 50-plus bases the next three years (1975–1977), twice led the league in doubles (1971–1972) and collected 102 RBI in the 1974 season.

Cedeño recorded his 1,000th career hit on July 2, 1976, against the Cincinnati Reds, doing so on a single against Pat Zachry, which was the second of four hits he would record in the game (including a 14th inning home run to help boost the Astros to a 10–7 win). Before his 26th birthday, Cedeño had accumulated 1,097 hits, the 13th highest total for a 25-year-old player in MLB history, having more than Rogers Hornsby (1,073) and Mickey Mantle (1,080), both of whom were inducted into the Baseball Hall of Fame.

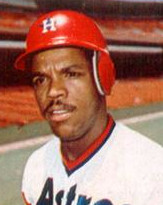
Cedeno in 1977 card

On September 9, 1981, while playing at Atlanta Stadium, Cedeño entered the stands to confront a heckler. No punches were thrown and no charges were filed, but Cedeño was ejected from the game and immediately suspended as a result. On September 11, Cedeño was fined $5,000 by National League President Chub Feeney but received no further suspension, as Cedeño apologized to the fan on the phone and in writing which Feeney cited as "mitigating circumstances".

Cedeño would finish in the top ten of stolen base leaders from 1971 to 1978 and again in 1980. His 550 stolen bases rank 27th all time as of January 2018. A winner of five consecutive Gold Glove Awards (1972–1976), Cedeño appeared in four All-Star Games (1972–1974; 1976), and was a contender for the National League MVP in 1972. In the All-Star Game of that year, Cedeño beat out Roberto Clemente for the starting National League position. Cedeño also hit for the cycle in both 1972 and 1976.

On December 18, 1981, Cedeño was traded to the Cincinnati Reds for Ray Knight. At the time of his departure from the Astros, he was the team's all-time leader in games played, runs, hits, doubles and stolen bases.

=== Cincinnati Reds ===
Cedeño played in 138 games to begin his Reds career, batting .289 with 142 hits with 16 stolen bases while walking/striking out 41 times each. His next few years would be shaky with the Reds, as he played a combined 291 games over the next three seasons, which had peaks of a .291 batting average in 1985 and lows of .232 in 1983, and he would have more strikeouts than walks in each season as well (after doing so nine times in his 12-year career with Houston). Cedeno collected his 2,000th career hit on April 28, 1985, doing so in the fifth inning against Mike Krukow of the San Francisco Giants at Candlestick Park. This made him the fifth member of the Reds on the roster to be part of the 2,000-hit club, which included Pete Rose, Tony Pérez, Dave Concepción and Buddy Bell.

=== St. Louis Cardinals ===
On August 29, 1985, he was traded to the St. Louis Cardinals for Mark Jackson. With St. Louis he hit .434 with six home runs in 28 games, and arguably provided the necessary power for his new team to outpace the New York Mets to reach the playoffs. With only one month left in the season, Cedeño had the Cardinals' longest hitting streak during their 1985 season. He then played at first base to replace the injured Jack Clark in the final regular season games, and played in the outfield in the playoffs to help replace the injured Vince Coleman.

He finished his combined 1985 season by playing in 111 games while batting .291 with 14 stolen bases. Cedeno was granted free agency on November 12, 1985.

=== Los Angeles Dodgers ===
Cedeño finished his career with the Dodgers and played his final game on June 2, 1986.

=== Estrellas Orientales ===
In between, Cedeño played six seasons for the Estrellas Orientales club of the Dominican Winter League, and reinforced the Tigres del Licey in the 1972 Caribbean Series. He later played with the Gold Coast Suns of the Senior Professional Baseball Association in its 1989 inaugural season.

== Career statistics ==
In 17 seasons, Cedeño played in 2,006 games, compiling a .285 batting average (2087-7310), with 436 doubles, 60 triples, 199 home runs, 976 RBI, 550 stolen bases, 664 walks, a .347 on-base percentage and .443 slugging percentage. In 17 post-season games, he hit only .173 (9-52). He played first base and all three outfield positions and recorded a .985 fielding percentage.

== Coaching career ==
After retiring, Cedeño has been both a fielding and hitting coach in the Dominican and Venezuelan winter leagues. He also served as a coach for the rookie-level Gulf Coast League farm team of the Washington Nationals before being let go in 2009. After that, he served as a hitting coach for the Greeneville Astros of the Appalachian League.

== Personal life ==
On December 11, 1973, when he was 22 years old, Cedeño was involved in an incident in his native Dominican Republic in which a gun discharged in a motel room, killing a 19-year-old woman who was in the room with him. Authorities said Cedeño and the woman were drinking and playing with a gun when the gun fired, killing the 19-year-old. He was initially charged with voluntary manslaughter and held in prison without bail, while his lawyers negotiated for a reduction of the charge to involuntary manslaughter. He was held for 20 days before he was released on bail. He was found guilty of involuntary manslaughter and fined $100. Cedeño's reputation with fans suffered greatly for the remainder of his career, and Cedeño thereafter never achieved a popularity with fans commensurate with his formidable on-field productivity.

In 1992, Cedeño was charged with battery in Orlando, Florida, in an incident involving his then-pregnant girlfriend, Pamela Lamon. This followed a 1988 incident involving Lamon in which Cedeño was charged with assault, causing bodily injury, and resisting arrest.

== See also ==
- 20–50 club
- Houston Astros award winners and league leaders
- List of Houston Astros team records
- List of Major League Baseball annual doubles leaders
- List of Major League Baseball career assists as a center fielder leaders
- List of Major League Baseball career hits leaders
- List of Major League Baseball career doubles leaders
- List of Major League Baseball career putouts as a center fielder leaders
- List of Major League Baseball career runs scored leaders
- List of Major League Baseball career stolen bases leaders
- List of Major League Baseball players from the Dominican Republic
- List of Major League Baseball players to hit for the cycle

Awards and achievements
Preceded by Bob Watson; George Foster	National League Player of the Month; June 1972; September 1977	Succeeded by Billy Williams; Rick Monday
Preceded by Dave Kingman; Lyman Bostock	Hitting for the cycle August 2, 1972; August 9, 1976	Succeeded by Bobby Murcer; Mike Hegan
