= Gary Moore (baseball) =

American baseball player (born 1945)

- Outfielder
- Born: February 24, 1945 (age 81); Tulsa, Oklahoma
- Batted: Right Threw: Left

MLB debut
- May 3, 1970, for the Los Angeles Dodgers

Last MLB appearance
- May 23, 1970, for the Los Angeles Dodgers

MLB statistics
- Batting average: .188
- At bats: 16
- Hits: 3
- Stats at Baseball Reference

Teams
- Los Angeles Dodgers (1970)

Gary Douglas Moore (born February 24, 1945) is an American outfielder in Major League Baseball. Born in Tulsa, Oklahoma, he played in 7 games for the Los Angeles Dodgers in the 1970 baseball season. In that season he recorded 16 at bats, 2 runs, 3 hits, 2 triples, 1 stolen base, and was struck out once. His final batting average was .188.
