= Jim Ray =

American baseball player (1944–2005)

- Pitcher
- Born: December 1, 1944; Rock Hill, South Carolina, U.S.
- Died: May 26, 2005 (aged 60); Margate, Florida, U.S.
- Batted: Right Threw: Right

MLB debut
- September 16, 1965, for the Houston Astros

Last MLB appearance
- September 30, 1974, for the Detroit Tigers

MLB statistics
- Win–loss record: 43–30
- Earned run average: 3.61
- Strikeouts: 407
- Stats at Baseball Reference

Teams
- Houston Astros (1965–1966, 1968–1973); Detroit Tigers (1974)

James Francis Ray (December 1, 1944 – May 26, 2005) was an American right-handed professional baseball pitcher, who played in Major League Baseball (MLB) from 1965 to 1966 and from 1968 to 1974 for the Houston Astros and Detroit Tigers.

Born in Rock Hill, South Carolina, he attended Holly High School in Holly, Michigan, and was signed by the Baltimore Orioles in 1963.

The 6 ft 1 in (1.85 m), 185 lb (84 kg) Ray was known as a hard thrower with a stellar fastball and earned the nickname "Sting Ray" during the 1969 season when he struck out 115 batters in 115 innings. Two years later, he appeared in 47 games played for the 1971 Astros, all but one in relief, and won ten of 14 decisions with a 2.12 earned run average (ERA). He was traded along with Gary Sutherland from the Astros to the Tigers for Fred Scherman at the Winter Meetings on December 3, 1973. For his career, Ray appeared in 308 Major League games, all but 20 in relief, and notched 25 saves.

Ray died on May 26, 2005, in Margate, Florida.
