= Jimmy Stewart (baseball) =

American baseball player (1939–2012)

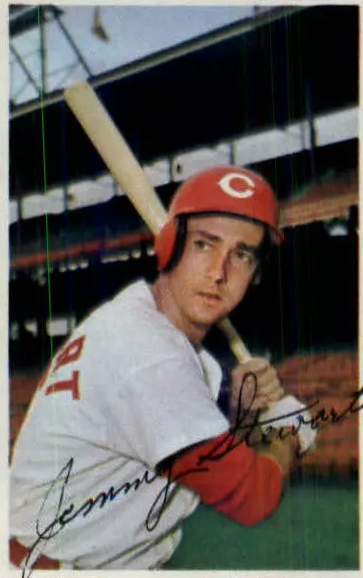
- Stewart in 1971
- Infielder / Outfielder
- Born: June 11, 1939; Opelika, Alabama, U.S.
- Died: November 24, 2012 (aged 73); Tampa, Florida, U.S.
- Batted: Switch Threw: Right

MLB debut
- September 3, 1963, for the Chicago Cubs

Last MLB appearance
- September 23, 1973, for the Houston Astros

MLB statistics
- Batting average: .237
- Home runs: 8
- Runs batted in: 112
- Stats at Baseball Reference

Teams
- Chicago Cubs (1963–1967); Chicago White Sox (1967); Cincinnati Reds (1969–1971); Houston Astros (1972–1973)

James Franklin Stewart (June 11, 1939 – November 24, 2012) was an American Major League Baseball utility man and scout. During his active career, he appeared in 777 MLB games for the Chicago Cubs, Chicago White Sox, Cincinnati Reds and Houston Astros over ten seasons between 1963 and 1973. He was a switch hitter who threw right handed, and was listed as 6 feet (1.8 m) tall and 165 pounds (75 kg).

He was born in Opelika, Alabama, to John and Nelle Stewart, graduating in 1957 from Lafayette High School (Alabama), where he starred in baseball, basketball and track. Stewart then went to Austin Peay State University on Clarksville, Tennessee, where he lettered in those same three sports.

== Playing career ==
Stewart signed with the Chicago Cubs' organization prior to the 1961 baseball season. After three years in the minor leagues, he came to the majors as a middle infielder, making his Cubs' debut at age 24 on September 3, 1963, in a 16–3 loss to the San Francisco Giants in Candlestick Park. His first career at-bat was a pinch-hit flyout against Baseball Hall of Famer Juan Marichal. His first hit came a week later on September 10 in an 8–0 road loss to the St. Louis Cardinals. Again, he was pinch-hitting against a Hall of Famer, Bob Gibson, but this time he hit a double and later singled against Gibson.

His most productive season came in 1964 for the Cubs, when he played 132 games and batted .253 with 105 hits, three home runs, 33 runs batted in, 17 doubles and 49 walks.

He was purchased by the Chicago White Sox on May 22, 1967. He appeared in 24 games for the White Sox between June 21 and July 23, mostly as a pinch hitter, pinch runner and defensive replacement. Sent to Triple-A after July 23, Stewart played in the ChiSox' minor league system until he was drafted by the Cincinnati Reds in the 1968 Rule 5 draft. Due to his versatility in the field, during his three seasons with the Reds, Stewart was known as "Super Sub" as he played every position except pitcher. He played in two games of the 1970 World Series, going hitless in two at-bats as the Reds fell to the Baltimore Orioles in five games.

On November 29, 1971, Stewart was part of the landmark trade that brought Hall of Fame second baseman Joe Morgan, outfielders César Gerónimo and Ed Armbrister, pitcher Jack Billingham and infielder Denis Menke to the Reds; slugger Lee May, Cincinnati second baseman Tommy Helms, and Stewart went to Houston in exchange. Morgan would win back-to-back National League Most Valuable Player Awards in 1975 and 1976—and lead the Reds to consecutive World Series championships. Meanwhile, Stewart appeared in 129 games for Houston in a utility role during 1972 and 1973. He played his final major league game at age 34 on September 29, 1973, and was released by the Astros on October 26.

He ended his ten-year major league career with a .237 batting average, 336 hits, 45 doubles, 14 triples, eight home runs and 112 runs batted in. In the field, he played every position except pitcher: left field (179 appearances), second base (122), shortstop (107), center field (43), third base (37), first base (ten), right field (ten), and catcher (one).

== Longtime scout ==
In 1978 he was inducted into the Austin Peay Athletics Hall of Fame.

After his playing days ended, in 1980 Stewart rejoined the Reds, first as a minor league manager and then as a scout. He was a major league scout for Cincinnati from 1984 through 1991, then joined the Philadelphia Phillies as a major league special assignment scout in 1992, remaining in that role until leaving baseball in 2006.

He retired to Florida with his wife, Donna. Jimmy Stewart died at age 73 on November 24, 2012, in Odessa, Florida.
