= Jimmy Williams (coach) =

Canadian professional baseball player and coach

- Coach
- Born: May 25, 1926; Toronto, Ontario, Canada
- Died: June 6, 2016 (aged 90); Baltimore, Maryland, U.S.
- Batted: Right Threw: Right
- Stats at Baseball Reference

Teams
- Houston Astros (1975); Baltimore Orioles (1981–1987)

Career highlights and awards
- World Series champion (1983)

Member of the Canadian

Baseball Hall of Fame
- Induction: 1991

James Bernard Williams (May 25, 1926 – June 6, 2016) was a Canadian professional baseball outfielder, coach and manager. He played, coached, and managed in the minor leagues, and was a first base coach in Major League Baseball (MLB), primarily with the Baltimore Orioles. A Toronto native, Williams threw and batted right-handed, stood 5 feet 10 inches (1.78 m) tall and weighed 180 pounds (82 kg). He is an inductee of the Canadian Baseball Hall of Fame.

== Playing career ==
Williams played in the farm system of the Brooklyn/Los Angeles Dodgers during 1947–1964 and although he never was called to the major leagues as a player, Williams enjoyed several highly productive seasons. In his first year as a professional, split between three Dodgers farm teams in the lower minors, Williams batted a composite .367 with 15 triples, 121 runs batted in, 24 stolen bases and 12 home runs. He played three seasons (1955–1957) of Triple-A baseball in his native Canada with the Montreal Royals of the International League, batting .329 in 1955 with 93 runs scored, 33 doubles, eight triples, 13 homers, and 21 stolen bases, and also exceeded the .300 mark with the 1958 Spokane Indians of the Pacific Coast League.

== Manager and coach ==
Williams began managing in the Dodgers farm system in 1963, then went on to manage in minor league baseball through 1980, where he compiled a record of 1,155 wins and 1,156 defeats (.499). His seventeen years of managing in the minors was interrupted by a brief period of coaching with the Major-League Houston Astros for a season in 1975. His most significant achievement was his tenure coaching first base with the Baltimore Orioles (1981–1987), a run which included their historic 1983 World Series win.

Williams then followed former Baltimore general manager Hank Peters to the Cleveland Indians, where Williams served as director of field operations in the club's farm system. He retired in 1988.

== Personal life ==
Williams graduated from De La Salle College School of Toronto, where he played varsity baseball, hockey (as a right wing), football and lacrosse.

Williams met his first wife, Lorraine Elliott, while playing for the Pueblo Dodgers in 1949, with whom he had three children, Chris, Kirk and Julie. When he was not playing winter baseball in Caracas, San Juan or Havana they made their home in Pueblo, Colorado. He was very handy with tools, worked construction (building houses), and was frequently adding rooms or moving walls in their home. In 1988, he married Carole Garrett of Baltimore, and continued his home-improvement work in the off season; their wedding date was inscribed on the front porch of their home in Joppa, Maryland.

In 1991, Williams was inducted to the Canadian Baseball Hall of Fame. Williams died in 2016 at age 90 in Baltimore, survived by his wife Carole and their son Jamie.

== Minor league managing career ==
- Santa Barbara Rancheros (1963)
- Grand Forks Dodgers (1964)
- Shelby Rebels (1965)
- Leesburg Athletics (1966–1967) – Championship in 1966
- Peninsula Grays (1968)
- Iowa Oaks (1969)
- Columbus Astros (1970) – Championship
- Oklahoma City 89ers (1971)
- Cocoa Astros (1972)
- Denver Bears (1973)
- Columbus Astros (1974)
- Lodi Dodgers (1976)
- Albuquerque Dukes (1977)
- Miami Orioles (1978) – Championship
- Charlotte O's (1979–80) – Championship in 1980

== Sources ==
- Howe News Bureau, 1985 Baltimore Orioles Organization Book. St. Petersburg, Florida: The Baseball Library, 1985.
