= Lee May =

American baseball player and coach (1943–2017)

- First baseman
- Born: March 23, 1943; Birmingham, Alabama, U.S.
- Died: July 29, 2017 (aged 74); Cincinnati, Ohio, U.S.
- Batted: Right Threw: Right

MLB debut
- September 1, 1965, for the Cincinnati Reds

Last MLB appearance
- September 24, 1982, for the Kansas City Royals

MLB statistics
- Batting average: .267
- Hits: 2,031
- Home runs: 354
- Runs batted in: 1,244
- Stats at Baseball Reference

Teams
- Cincinnati Reds (1965–1971); Houston Astros (1972–1974); Baltimore Orioles (1975–1980); Kansas City Royals (1981–1982)

Career highlights and awards
- 3× All-Star (1969, 1971, 1972); World Series champion (1985); AL RBI leader (1976); Cincinnati Reds Hall of Fame; Baltimore Orioles Hall of Fame

Lee Andrew May (March 23, 1943 – July 29, 2017) was an American professional baseball player and coach. He played in Major League Baseball (MLB) as a first baseman and designated hitter from 1965 to 1982 for the Cincinnati Reds, Houston Astros, Baltimore Orioles, and Kansas City Royals.

Nicknamed "the Big Bopper" for his power hitting, May produced at least 20 home runs and 80 runs batted in (RBI) for 11 consecutive seasons, and is one of only 11 major league players to have 100-RBI seasons for three different teams. He was a three-time All-Star player and was the American League (AL) RBI champion in 1976. May appeared in the postseason three times, including the 1970 World Series for the Reds and the 1979 World Series for the Orioles as well as the 1981 postseason with the Royals.

After his playing career, May spent several years as a hitting coach at the major league level for the Royals, Reds, Orioles and Tampa Bay Rays organizations. May was inducted into the Baltimore Orioles Hall of Fame in 1998 and into the Cincinnati Reds Hall of Fame in 2006. In 2009 he was inducted into the Alabama Sports Hall of Fame. He was the older brother of former professional baseball player, Carlos May.

== High school ==
May was a standout in both baseball and football at A.H. Parker High School in Birmingham. May played fullback on the varsity football team and was offered a scholarship at the University of Nebraska. However, the Cincinnati Reds organization was also interested in him, and the team signed May to an amateur free agent contract with a $12,000 bonus on June 1, 1961.

== Minor league ==
May began his professional career in 1961 with the Tampa Tarpons in the Florida State League, a D-league affiliate of the Reds. He played two years in Tampa before moving up to the Rocky Mount Leafs in the Class A Carolina League. The following year he was again promoted, this time to the Macon Peaches in the Class AA Southern League. At all three stops, May, like many black players, endured racist taunts not only from an opposing team's white fans but from the fans of his own team as well. May hated his time in Macon, Georgia the most. Not only did he hear racist epithets, but he also had to avoid thrown bottles. May's emergence in 1964 allowed him to be promoted the following year to the San Diego Padres of the Class AAA Pacific Coast League. During his only season with the Padres, May was one of the best players in the league. He hit 34 home runs while driving in 103 runs and hitting .321. He was called up briefly to the Reds at the end of season but then moved to the Reds' new Class AAA International League team, the Buffalo Bisons in 1966. A solid AAA season at Buffalo led to his permanent major league promotion.

== Major league career ==
=== Cincinnati Reds (1965–1971) ===
May made his major league debut on September 1, 1965, as a pinch hitter against the Milwaukee Braves. On September 24, 1966, at Crosley Field in Cincinnati, he hit his first major league home run against Bob Shaw of the New York Mets. It turned out to be the game-winning homer. May broke camp as a full-time member of the Reds in 1967. That season, May was named NL Rookie of the Year by The Sporting News. He was also named to the Topps All-Star Rookie Team. The next two years saw much of the construction of the future The Big Red Machine. Along with Johnny Bench, Tony Pérez, and Pete Rose, May helped power arguably one of baseball's great offenses. In 1968, he hit 22 home runs and drove in 80 runs. Despite only walking 38 times and striking out 100 times, he still had an OPS of .805 which was remarkable during the Year of the Pitcher.

In 1969, he finished the year with 38 home runs, third in the National League. He also had 110 RBIs which was fourth in the league. May was also second in extra base hits, fourth in total bases, sixth in slugging percentage and sixth in doubles. Also in 1969, May had three consecutive multi-home run games, a feat that has only happened three other times in major league history.

Teammate Tommy Helms nicknamed May, "the Big Bopper from Birmingham", which later was shortened to "the Big Bopper." During his time in Cincinnati, May was one of the clubhouse leaders for the Reds. With his pragmatic personality and comic sense of timing, manager Sparky Anderson often called on May to put out clubhouse fires.

In 1970, the Reds pounded nearly everyone into submission. Batting in the fifth slot, May delivered 94 runs batted in. On June 24, 1970, May hit the last home run in the history of Crosley Field during the park's final game. The game-winning shot came in the eighth inning off San Francisco Giants pitcher Juan Marichal.

May was the most productive member of the Big Red Machine in the 1970 World Series against the Baltimore Orioles. He batted .389 with two home runs, six runs scored which was tied with Boog Powell for Series high and eight RBI which was a five-game World Series record at the time. He also had the highest slugging percentage and on-base plus slugging (OPS) with .833 and 1.283 respectively. His three-run homer to left field off Eddie Watt's first pitch in the eighth inning of Game 4 led to the only Series victory for the Reds who avoided an Orioles' four-match sweep.

Although the Reds slumped in 1971, May continued to slug away, hitting 39 home runs (third in the NL) and driving in 98 RBIs (sixth in NL). Consequently, May was named the Reds MVP for the 1971 season.

=== Houston Astros (1972–1974) ===
May with the Astros in 1972 card

With the Reds needing to shore up their infield defense and add speed on the basepaths and seeing Tony Pérez and May as essentially the same type of player (right-handed power hitters), the Reds sent May to the Houston Astros for future Hall of Famer Joe Morgan. The Astros, badly in need of power after finishing last in the NL in home runs in 1971, completed a trade with the Reds on November 29, 1971, that sent second baseman Morgan, pitcher Jack Billingham, infielder Denis Menke, outfielder César Gerónimo and minor leaguer Ed Armbrister for May, second baseman Tommy Helms and utility man Jimmy Stewart.

Although his power numbers dropped in the Astrodome, the toughest ballpark to hit a home run in the National League, he continued to drive in runs on a regular basis. His 105 RBI in 1973 was second in the league. During the 1973 season, May set an Astro club record with a 21-game hitting streak. It was during this streak he hit three home runs in one game (also a club record) and collected his 1,000th base hit. On April 29, 1974, May became the 17th player in MLB history to hit two home runs in one inning.

=== Baltimore Orioles (1975–1980) ===
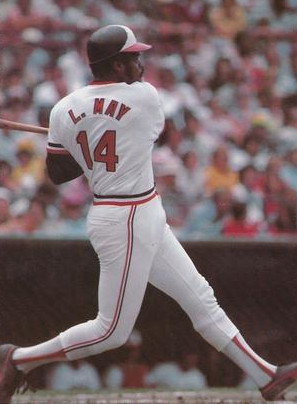
May at bat in 1977 as a member of the Baltimore Orioles.

May was acquired along with Jay Schlueter by the Baltimore Orioles from the Astros for Enos Cabell and Rob Andrews at the Winter Meetings on December 3, 1974. Averaging 32 homers and 98 RBI as one of MLB's top five power hitters over the previous five seasons, May was expected to improve the Orioles' offensive production at first base.

He took an immediate liking to the American League. In his first at bat in the junior circuit, he hit a three-run home run at Tiger Stadium. In his first appearance at Boston's Fenway Park, May crushed two three-run home runs over the park's famed Green Monster including a game-winning shot.

In 1976, May enjoyed his best season as an Oriole. He hit 25 home runs and led the American League in RBI with 109. For his effort, May won the Louis M. Hatter Most Valuable Oriole Award.

In his last three seasons with the Orioles, May was primarily used as a designated hitter to make room for a young Eddie Murray at first base. Although May was a major contributor in 1979 with 19 homers and 69 RBI, in the 1979 World Series, he only came to bat twice because the DH was not used in that series.

=== Kansas City Royals (1981–1982) ===
After being allowed to leave the Orioles via free agency after the 1980 season, May signed with the Royals as part-time 1B/DH/pinch hitter. Despite hitting .308 in only 48 games in 1982, the 39-year-old May was released by the team in November and he decided to call it a career.

Following his release from the Royals, he was hired back as the team's hitting coach and earned a World Series ring as part of the 1985 World Series championship team.

== Overall career ==
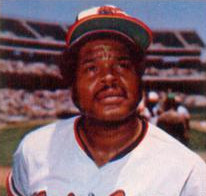
May card

In his 18-season career, May posted a .267 batting average, with 354 home runs, 1244 runs batted in, and 2031 hits in 2071 games. Defensively, he recorded a .994 fielding percentage. May was prone to strike out; 10 times he fanned more than 100 times in a season and compiled 1,570 in his career. However, he is one of 11 major leaguers to reach the 100-RBI plateau playing for three teams, the others being Dick Allen, Joe Carter, Orlando Cepeda, Rocky Colavito, Goose Goslin, Rogers Hornsby, Reggie Jackson, Al Simmons, Vic Wertz, and Alex Rodriguez.

May is currently in three different Halls of Fame: Baltimore Orioles Hall of Fame (1988), Cincinnati Reds Hall of Fame (2006), Alabama Sports Hall of Fame (2009). The Big Bopper of Birmingham and Frank Robinson are the only players to be elected to both the Orioles and Reds Halls of Fame.

== Family ==
Lee May and his wife, Terrye, have three children and nine grandchildren. His son, Lee May Jr., was a New York Mets first-round pick in 1986 and played from 1986 through 1993 in their Minor League system. After that, he began his coaching career in the Mets organization in 1999 and later worked as the minor league hitting coordinator for the Seattle Mariners from 2012 to 2015. He previously served as a manager and coach in the Cleveland Indians system for seven seasons beginning in 2004, and then joined the Boston Red Sox organization in 2016, serving as the hitting coach for the Greenville Drive. May Jr.'s son, Jacob May, played baseball at Coastal Carolina University, and was selected by the Chicago White Sox in the third round (91st overall) of the 2013 MLB draft.

== Death ==
May died of pneumonia at a hospital in Cincinnati on July 29, 2017, aged 74. He also had heart disease.

== Literary references ==
May was featured in a Sports Illustrated story written by Steve Rushin about TV character Sam Malone from the show Cheers. Fictitiously, Malone was a former major league pitcher who served up a pitch that May crushed all the way out of Baltimore's Memorial Stadium.

== See also ==
- List of Major League Baseball career hits leaders
- List of Major League Baseball career home run leaders
- List of Major League Baseball career runs batted in leaders
- List of Major League Baseball annual runs batted in leaders

Sporting positions
Preceded by Rocky Colavito	Kansas City Royals Hitting Coach; 1984–1986	Succeeded by Hal McRae
Preceded by Tony Pérez	Cincinnati Reds First Base Coach; 1988–1989	Succeeded by Tony Pérez
Preceded by José Cardenal	Tampa Bay Rays First Base Coach; 2001–2002	Succeeded by Billy Hatcher
