= Larry Howard =

American baseball player (1945–2019)

- Catcher
- Born: June 6, 1945; Columbus, Ohio, U.S.
- Died: May 11, 2019 (aged 73); Kingman, Arizona, U.S.
- Batted: Right Threw: Right

MLB debut
- August 9, 1970, for the Houston Astros

Last MLB appearance
- July 2, 1973, for the Atlanta Braves

MLB statistics
- Batting average: .236
- Home runs: 6
- Runs batted in: 47
- Stats at Baseball Reference

Teams
- Houston Astros (1970–1972); Atlanta Braves (1973)

Lawrence Rayford Howard (June 6, 1945 – May 11, 2019) was an American Major League Baseball catcher. He played four seasons with the Houston Astros (1970–1973) and Atlanta Braves (1973). He died on May 11, 2019.

== Baseball career ==
Howard attended Atwater High School in Atwater, California. He was signed by the Houston Colt 45s as an undrafted free agent in 1963. He spent seven years in the minors before being called up by the Houston Astros.
