= Bob Stinson (baseball) =

American baseball player (born 1945)

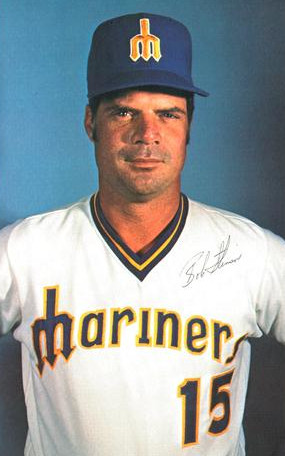
- Stinson in 1978
- Catcher
- Born: October 11, 1945 (age 81); Elkin, North Carolina, U.S.
- Batted: Switch Threw: Right

MLB debut
- September 23, 1969, for the Los Angeles Dodgers

Last MLB appearance
- August 1, 1980, for the Seattle Mariners

MLB statistics
- Batting average: .250
- Home runs: 33
- Runs batted in: 180
- Stats at Baseball Reference

Teams
- Los Angeles Dodgers (1969–1970); St. Louis Cardinals (1971); Houston Astros (1972); Montreal Expos (1973–1974); Kansas City Royals (1975–1976); Seattle Mariners (1977–1980)

Gorrell Robert Stinson III (born October 11, 1945) is an American former switch-hitting catcher in Major League Baseball from 1969-1980. Stinson played for six major league franchises, most notably the Seattle Mariners.

== Career ==
Stinson was selected in the Major League Baseball draft by both the Kansas City Athletics and Washington Senators while at Miami Senior High School in Miami, Florida, but did not sign with either club. He was then taken by the Los Angeles Dodgers on June 7, 1966, as the 15th overall selection in the secondary phase of the draft while attending Miami-Dade Community College.

Stinson broke into the Majors on September 23, 1969, with the Dodgers at the age of 23. In 1969 and 1970, he appeared in a total of eight games for the Dodgers. Then, on October 5, 1970, Stinson was traded along with Ted Sizemore to the St. Louis Cardinals for Dick Allen. He appeared in 17 games in 1971 for the Cardinals.

Finding a role as a journeyman, Stinson moved on to the Houston Astros, spending the 1972 season in that organization. The Astros sold his contract to the Montreal Expos on March 28, 1973. He played two seasons each with the Expos and Kansas City Royals.

A new opportunity presented itself when the expansion Seattle club, one of two new American League teams (along with the Toronto Blue Jays) that played their inaugural seasons in 1977 selected Stinson from the Royals on November 5, 1976, as the 25th overall pick in the expansion draft. Stinson had been a backup for his Major League career before joining the Mariners. Stinson saw regular action with the young Mariners club for the first time, being designated the primary catcher in 1977 and 1978.

Stinson logged his best overall season in 1978, establishing career highs in games played, at-bats, hits, doubles, home runs, and RBI. In 124 games for Seattle that season, he batted .258 with 11 homers and drove in 55 runs. He also had a .346 on-base percentage and a .404 slugging average.

Yet with the March 1979 acquisition of Larry Cox from the Chicago Cubs, Stinson's playing time slowly began to dwindle. That season, Stinson caught in 91 games to Cox's 99. By 1980, Cox was the Mariners' regular catcher, with Stinson the backup before eventually losing the backup job to 24-year-old Jerry Narron, future Major League manager and coach. Stinson's final game in a big league uniform was August 1, 1980, after over three and a half seasons with the Mariners. He was released by Seattle seven days later.

Stinson tasted his only postseason action with Kansas City in 1976, appearing in two games of the American League Championship Series against the New York Yankees.

In 652 major league games, Stinson had 408 hits in 1634 at-bats, a .250 batting average, 33 home runs, and 180 RBI.

== Personal life ==
Stinson lives in The Villages, Florida with his wife of over 56 years, Gayle. They have two children, Kevin and Kim, and seven grandchildren.
