= Stan Wasiak =

American baseball manager (1920–1992)

- Minor League Manager
- Born: April 8, 1920; Chicago, Illinois, U.S.
- Died: November 20, 1992 (aged 72); Mobile, Alabama, U.S.
- Batted: Right Threw: Right
- Stats at Baseball Reference

Stanley Wasiak (April 18, 1920 – November 20, 1992) was an American manager in minor league baseball who holds the records for most games managed (4,844), most victories (2,530) and most defeats (2,314).

A native of Chicago, Wasiak was a second baseman and catcher in his playing days (1940–41; 1946–59); his career was interrupted by four years of service in the United States Army during World War II. In 1950, he was named playing manager of the Valdosta, Georgia, Dodgers of the Class D Georgia–Florida League. He led the team to a second-place, 81–56 record – one half game behind the Albany, Georgia, Cardinals. Wasiak's Valdosta team came back in 1951 to win the league pennant by five games.

Wasiak spent the vast majority of his managing career in the Brooklyn/Los Angeles Dodgers' farm system, although he briefly worked for the Detroit Tigers and Chicago White Sox. He managed in the Triple-A Pacific Coast League from 1973–76 as skipper of the Albuquerque Dukes, the Dodgers' top minor league affiliate, winning a division title in 1974. But most of his assignments came below the Double-A level.

Officially, Wasiak managed for 37 consecutive seasons (1950–86) in the minors. However, in 1982, in the middle of a seven-year term as manager of the Vero Beach Dodgers of the Class A Florida State League, he was sidelined for almost the entire season after undergoing heart surgery the previous winter. But Wasiak was able to manage one game on August 24, keeping his streak alive. When he retired after the 1986 campaign, he had compiled a career winning percentage of .522. Wasiak never officially appeared in a Major League Baseball uniform as a coach or manager. In 1985 he was presented with the King of Baseball award given by Minor League Baseball.

He died at age 72 in Mobile, Alabama.
