= Pete Mikkelsen =

American baseball player (1939–2006)

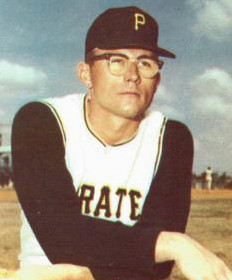
- Mikkelsen in 1966
- Pitcher
- Born: October 25, 1939; Staten Island, New York, U.S.
- Died: November 29, 2006 (aged 67); Mabton, Washington, U.S.
- Batted: Right Threw: Right

MLB debut
- April 17, 1964, for the New York Yankees

Last MLB appearance
- September 18, 1972, for the Los Angeles Dodgers

MLB statistics
- Win–loss record: 45–40
- Earned run average: 3.38
- Strikeouts: 436
- Saves: 49
- Stats at Baseball Reference

Teams
- New York Yankees (1964–1965); Pittsburgh Pirates (1966–1967); Chicago Cubs (1967–1968); St. Louis Cardinals (1968); Los Angeles Dodgers (1969–1972)

Peter James Mikkelsen (October 25, 1939 – November 29, 2006) was an American relief pitcher in Major League Baseball who played from 1964 through 1972 for the New York Yankees (1964–65), Pittsburgh Pirates (1966–67), Chicago Cubs (1967–68), St. Louis Cardinals (1968) and Los Angeles Dodgers (1969–72). Mikkelsen batted and threw right-handed was listed as 6 feet 2 inches (1.88 m) tall and 210 pounds (95 kg). He was born in Staten Island, New York.

A sinker-ball specialist, Mikkelsen filled various relief roles coming out from the bullpen, as a closer or a middle reliever, and as a set-up man as well. He reached the majors in 1964 with the New York Yankees, spending two years with them before moving to the Pirates, Cubs, Cardinals and Dodgers. He finished 7–4 with a 3.56 ERA and 12 saves in his rookie season, but in the 1964 World Series against St. Louis he allowed a Tim McCarver game-winning three-run home run in the 10th inning of Game Five. His most productive season came in 1966 with Pittsburgh, when he posted a 3.07 ERA and set career-highs with nine wins, 14 saves, 76 strikeouts, 126 innings, and 71 games pitched. He also gave four years of good service for the Dodgers with 24 wins and 20 saves in 155 appearances. In 1969–70 he averaged a 2.76 ERA for each season.

In a nine-season career, Mikkelsen posted a 45–40 record with a 3.38 ERA and 49 saves in 364 games.

Pete missed the start of the 1970 season after contracting infectious hepatitis, allegedly during a hunting trip before spring training.

Mikkelsen died from cancer in Mabton, Washington, at the age of 67.
