= Willie Davis (baseball) =

American baseball player (1940–2010)

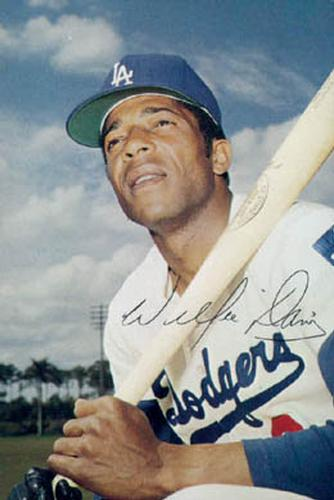
- Davis with the Los Angeles Dodgers in 1971
- Center fielder
- Born: April 15, 1940; Mineral Springs, Arkansas, U.S.
- Died: March 9, 2010 (aged 69); Burbank, California, U.S.
- Batted: Left Threw: Left

Professional debut
- MLB: September 8, 1960, for the Los Angeles Dodgers
- NPB: April 2, 1977, for the Chunichi Dragons

Last appearance
- NPB: September 30, 1978, for the Crown Lighter Lions
- MLB: September 30, 1979, for the California Angels

MLB statistics
- Batting average: .279
- Hits: 2,561
- Home runs: 182
- Runs batted in: 1,053
- Stolen bases: 398

NPB statistics
- Batting average: .297
- Home runs: 43
- Runs batted in: 132
- Stats at Baseball Reference

Teams
- Los Angeles Dodgers (1960–1973); Montreal Expos (1974); Texas Rangers (1975); St. Louis Cardinals (1975); San Diego Padres (1976); Chunichi Dragons (1977); Crown Lighter Lions (1978); California Angels (1979)

Career highlights and awards
- 2× All-Star (1971, 1973); 2× World Series champion (1963, 1965); 3× Gold Glove Award (1971–1973)

William Henry Davis (April 15, 1940 – March 9, 2010) was an American professional baseball player. He played in Major League Baseball and the Nippon Professional Baseball league as a center fielder from 1960 through 1979, most prominently as an integral member of the Los Angeles Dodgers teams that won three National League pennants and two World Series titles between 1963 and 1966.

Known for his speed and agility as an outfielder as well as a base runner, Davis was a three-time Gold Glove Award winner and a two-time National League (NL) All-Star player during his tenure with the Dodgers. He ranks fifth among center fielders in Major League Baseball history in career putouts. He also played for the Montreal Expos, Texas Rangers, St. Louis Cardinals, and the San Diego Padres before spending two seasons in the Nippon Professional Baseball league with the Chunichi Dragons and the Crown Lighter Lions. After his stint in Japan, Davis returned to Major League Baseball where he played one final season with the California Angels in 1979.

At the time of his retirement in 1979, Davis had accumulated 2,561 hits over his 18-year playing career. He ranked seventh in major league history in putouts (5,449) and total chances (5,719) in the outfield, and third in games in center field (2,237). He was ninth in National League history in total outfield games (2,274). He had 13 seasons of 20 or more stolen bases, led the NL in triples twice, and retired with the fourth most triples (138) by any major leaguer since 1945. He holds Los Angeles club records (1958–present) for career hits (2,091), runs (1,004), triples (110), at bats (7,495), total bases (3,094) and extra base hits (585). His 31-game hitting streak in 1969 remains as the Dodgers team record more than 50 years after his retirement.

== Career ==
As a youngster, Davis moved to Los Angeles, where he was a three-sport standout in baseball, basketball, and track and field at Theodore Roosevelt High School. He once ran a 9.5-second 100-yard dash, and set a city record in the long jump of 25 feet 5 inches (7.75 m). Discovered by the Dodgers scout, Kenny Myers, Davis signed with the ballclub upon graduating from Roosevelt in 1958.

Davis played his first game with the Los Angeles Dodgers in 1960. The following season he replaced the former All-Star Duke Snider in center field, where Davis stayed for 13 years. Widely considered to be one of the fastest baseball players of the 1960s, Davis had 20 or more stolen bases in eleven consecutive seasons, with a career-high 42 in 1964. Along with Maury Wills, Davis provided footspeed at the top of Dodgers' lineup. In 1962, these two players "set the table" for teammate Tommy Davis to lead the National League with 153 runs batted in (RBI), a Los Angeles Dodgers single-season record. Willie Davis, along with Maury Wills, was a key part of the Dodgers' National League titles in 1963, 1965, and 1966.

In 1962, Davis batted .285 with 85 runs batted in, posting career highs in home runs (21), runs (103), and hits (171). In that same season, Davis and Wills set a National League record for stolen bases by two teammates in season with 136 (Wills with 104 and Davis with 32). 1962 was the first of two seasons that Davis would lead the National League in triples. It was the first of two seasons that he would tally double-figure totals in doubles, triples, home runs, and stolen bases.

Davis was a part of two World Series championship teams, in 1963 and 1965. In the 1963 World Series He knocked in the game winning run with a 1st inning 2 run double in game 2 and in game 4 the game that clinched the World Series, he hit the game winning RBI with a Sacrifice Fly in the 7th Inning. In the 1965 World Series, Davis set a record (since broken) of three stolen bases in a single game -- including one during which he stumbled and fell, the pitcher hesitated throwing to first base, and Davis literally crawled to second base safely.

Davis committed a World Series record three errors on two consecutive plays, in the fifth inning of Game Two of the 1966 World Series. First, he lost Paul Blair's fly ball in the sun for a two-base error. One batter later, he dropped Andy Etchebarren's fly ball. When he recovered the Etchebarren ball, Davis threw it over third base, allowing Boog Powell and Blair to score. When questioned after the game, he said, "Even when you can't see the ball you have to take a stab at it, I couldn't see the ball in the sun." The Orioles swept the Dodgers, four games to none. The Dodgers did not score a run in Game Two, Game Three, or Game Four. In Game Four, Davis made a leaping catch at the centerfield fence, robbing Powell of a home run.

Davis batted a career-high .311 in 1969. His 31-game hitting streak that year, from August 1 to September 3, was the longest in the major leagues since 1949, when Dom DiMaggio hit in 34 straight. Davis' streak broke the previous franchise record of 29, set in 1916 by Zack Wheat. When he tied Wheat's previous record at 29 games, the message board at Dodger Stadium flashed a message sent via telegram by Wheat from his home in Missouri, saying, "Congratulations. Keep going. You have done a good job. Good luck." Davis was named NL Player of the Month of August with a .459 batting average. During the streak, his season average climbed from .259 to .316.

In 1970, Davis batted .305, posting career highs in triples (16) and RBI (93). His 16 triples led all major league players, and was the second time he led the National League in triples.

He ended 1971 with career highs in doubles (33) and total bases (281). He batted .309, his third straight season topping .300. For the second time, he posted double-figure totals in doubles, triples, home runs and stolen bases. Davis was selected for his first (of two) National League All-Star team in 1971. He was awarded his first (of three) Gold Glove award.

Davis won three consecutive Gold Glove awards, 1971 through 1973. He was the first National League outfielder who threw left-handed to be so honored, and just the second in Major League history (the first was Vic Davalillo, who won an American League Gold Glove in 1964). For his career, Davis led the NL in putouts by an outfielder twice, in 1964 and 1971. He led NL center fielders in assists twice, in 1963 and 1964. He led NL center fielders in fielding percentage twice, in 1970 and 1976. He also led centerfielders in errors five times, in 1962, 1963, 1965, 1968, and 1974.

In two All-Star games, 1971 and 1973, he batted a combined 3-for-3, with a home run off Nolan Ryan.

Davis was traded from the Dodgers to the Montreal Expos for Mike Marshall at the Winter Meetings on December 5, 1973. Marshall would win the Cy Young Award in 1974. Davis batted .295 with 12 home runs and 25 stolen bases and led the team in hits (180), runs (86), doubles (27), triples (9) and RBI (89) in his only season with the Expos which dealt him to the Texas Rangers for Don Stanhouse and Pete Mackanin at the Winter Meetings on December 5, 1974. Davis hit .249 with five home runs and 17 RBI in 42 games with the Rangers before being sent to the St. Louis Cardinals for Ed Brinkman and Tommy Moore on June 4, 1975. After batting .291, he was traded for a third time within a year when he was dealt from the Cardinals to the San Diego Padres for Dick Sharon on October 20, 1975. He batted .268 with the Padres in 1976, then he spent two years in Japan with the Chunichi Dragons and Crown Lighter Lions.

He played his final major league season with the California Angels in 1979, making two pinch-hitting appearances in the American League Championship Series. He played in the Mexican League in 1980, managing part of the year, before retiring.

In an 18-year career, Davis accumulated a .279 batting average with 182 home runs and 1,053 RBI in 2,429 games. He also collected 2,561 hits and 398 stolen bases. His total of 2,237 games in center field ranks behind only Willie Mays (2,827) and Tris Speaker (2,690) in major league history. In addition to the Los Angeles records he retains, his club mark of 1,952 games was surpassed by Bill Russell in 1984; Steve Garvey broke his records of 849 RBI and 321 doubles in 1981 and 1982 respectively. Garvey and Ron Cey passed his Los Angeles club record of 154 home runs in 1979; Davis' record for left-handed hitters was broken by Shawn Green in 2004.

Despite his impressive career, Davis was excluded from the 1985 Baseball Hall of Fame balloting, the first year for which he would have been eligible, nor has he been added to subsequent ballots. His 60.8 career WAR (according to Baseball Reference) is the highest among all players to not appear on a Hall of Fame ballot (excluding banned players).

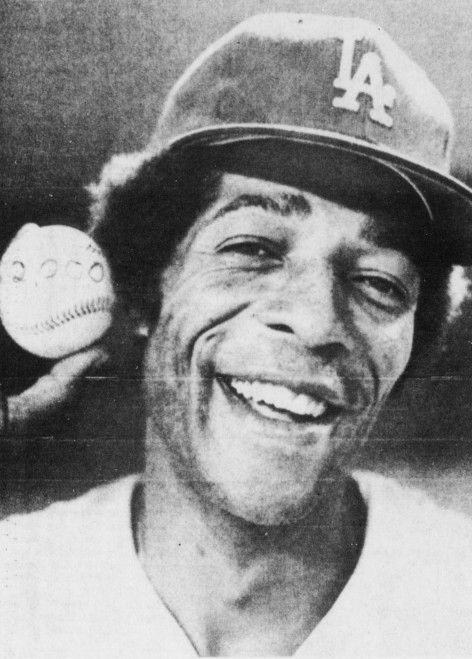
Davis in 1973, holding the home run ball that he hammered for his 2,000th career hit

== Legacy and post-baseball ==
Davis married Jeanna LemYou, whom he met in Los Angeles while a member of the Dodgers, on September 5, 1963. Davis subsequently adopted Jeanna's son, Gregory Chapman Davis. Jeanna and Davis had two daughters, Kimberly in 1964 and Jennifer in 1967, before divorcing in 1975. Davis also had another son, Shonan Casey Davis, with his second wife, Amy Rumbelow. He is also the biological father of former MLB player Eric Anthony.

A convert to Buddhism via his marriage to Jeanna, Davis constantly fingered his prayer beads and chanted before games. When Davis played in Japan, he hoped his host country would embrace his religion. However, his enthusiastic display of his religion disturbed his Japanese teammates and his fervent pregame chanting made them feel as if they were attending a Buddhist funeral, according to his manager, Wally Yonamine.

Davis appeared in several TV programs, including Mr. Ed, The Flying Nun, and Owen Marshall: Counselor at Law, and was a co-star of the Jerry Lewis comedy film from 1970, Which Way to the Front?. In a 1969 episode of Bewitched, Samantha, attending a game at Shea Stadium to see the New York Mets host the Dodgers, remarks "Willie Davis just hit a grand slam!" The episode was filmed August 22, 1969, a date when the Mets coincidentally beat the Dodgers at Shea. In reality, Davis went 2 for 4 in the game, but did not hit a grand slam.

Davis was found dead in his home in Burbank, California, on March 9, 2010, by a neighbor who sometimes brought him breakfast. Initial indications showed he most likely died of natural causes.

Davis, an Arkansas native, was voted 21st-greatest Arkansas sports figure by Sports Illustrated, along with former teammate Lou Brock, who was also on the list.

== See also ==
- List of Major League Baseball career hits leaders
- List of Major League Baseball career triples leaders
- List of Major League Baseball career runs scored leaders
- List of Major League Baseball career runs batted in leaders
- List of Major League Baseball career stolen bases leaders
- List of Major League Baseball annual triples leaders
- List of Major League Baseball single-game hits leaders

Preceded by Roberto Clemente	Major League Player of the Month; August 1969	Succeeded by Rico Carty
