= Mike Strahler =

American baseball player (1947–2016)

- Pitcher
- Born: March 14, 1947; Chicago, Illinois, U.S.
- Died: July 14, 2016 (aged 69); Alamogordo, New Mexico, U.S.
- Batted: Right Threw: Right

MLB debut
- September 12, 1970, for the Los Angeles Dodgers

Last MLB appearance
- September 25, 1973, for the Detroit Tigers

MLB statistics
- Win–loss record: 6–8
- Earned run average: 3.57
- Strikeouts: 80
- Stats at Baseball Reference

Teams
- Los Angeles Dodgers (1970–1972); Detroit Tigers (1973)

Michael Wayne Strahler (March 14, 1947 – July 14, 2016) was an American baseball player who played as a pitcher in the Major League Baseball. He pitched from 1970 to 1973 for the Los Angeles Dodgers and Detroit Tigers. He was traded from the Tigers to the Milwaukee Brewers for Ray Newman at the Winter Meetings on December 6, 1973.

Strahler died on July 14, 2016, aged 69.
