= 1972 Cincinnati Reds season =

1972 Cincinnati Reds
- National League Champion; National League West Division Champion
- League: National League
- Division: West
- Ballpark: Riverfront Stadium
- City: Cincinnati
- Record: 95–59 (.617)
- Divisional place: 1st
- Owners: Francis L. Dale
- General managers: Bob Howsam
- Managers: Sparky Anderson
- Television: WLWT (Tom Hedrick, Waite Hoyt)
- Radio: WLW (Al Michaels, Joe Nuxhall)

The 1972 Cincinnati Reds season was the 103rd season for the franchise in Major League Baseball, and their 3rd and 2nd full season at Riverfront Stadium in Cincinnati. The Reds won the National League West title with a record of 95 wins and 59 losses, 10 1/2 games over the Houston Astros and the Los Angeles Dodgers. They defeated the previous year's World Series Champion Pittsburgh Pirates in the NLCS, but lost to the Oakland Athletics in seven games in the World Series. The Reds were managed by Sparky Anderson.

The theme for the Reds was "Redemption" after a disastrous 1971 season that saw the Reds fall from a World Series participant in 1970 to a sub .500 team a year later. In fact, the March 13, 1972, Sports Illustrated edition featured the Reds on the front cover headlining "Redemption for the Reds." The Reds won 102 games in 1970, but only 79 a year later. A major catalyst for the Reds, Bobby Tolan, ruptured his Achilles' tendon in the winter of 1971 while playing basketball and he missed the entire 1971 MLB season. Nearly every Reds regular, including Pete Rose, Johnny Bench, Tony Pérez, Bernie Carbo and David Concepcion, had significant decreases in their production from 1970. The lone exception was popular first baseman Lee May, who set career highs in home runs (39) and slugging percentage (.532).

Reds fans, en masse, were shocked and dismayed when, on November 29, 1971, Cincinnati Reds General Manager Bob Howsam traded May, Gold Glove winning second baseman Tommy Helms and key utility man Jimmy Stewart to division rival Houston Astros for second baseman Joe Morgan, third baseman Denis Menke, pitcher Jack Billingham, little-used reserve outfielder Cesar Geronimo and minor leaguer Ed Armbrister. The trade turned out to be one of the best trades in Reds history. Morgan would escape the cavernous Houston Astrodome to a more hitter-friendly Riverfront Stadium home park. Surrounded by more talent in Cincinnati, Morgan would become one of the more productive power-speed players in the entire decade on his way to eventual induction into the Baseball Hall of Fame. Morgan and Geronimo would also go on to each win multiple Gold Glove awards, as Geronimo manned right field until 1974 when he would take over in center field. Billingham would go on to win 12 games in 1972 and 50 total in his first three years with the Reds. Billingham's best moments came in the 1972 World Series when he threw 13 2/3 innings allowing no earned runs in collecting a win, a save, and a no decision in Game 7.

With Rose, Morgan and a healthy Tolan at the top of the lineup, a rejuvenated Bench was the recipient as the Reds' cleanup hitter. Rebounding from the 1971 disaster when he only drove in 61 runs, Bench slammed 40 home runs and had a major league-best 125 RBI. Bench also walked a career-high 100 times on his way to NL MVP honors, his second in three years.

Cincinnati got off to a slow start, winning only eight of their first 21 games before winning nine straight. The Reds were still only 20–18 when they went into Houston to play the retooled Astros for a four-game series, May 29 – June 1, at the Astrodome, a notorious pitchers park. But the Reds scored 39 runs in the series and won all four games. The Reds went into the July 23 All-Star break with a 6 1/2 game lead over the Astros and an 8-game lead over the Dodgers. Neither team seriously threatened the Reds in the second half.

Reds ace Gary Nolan won 13 of his 15 decisions by July 13, only 79 games into the season. But Nolan suffered a series of neck and shoulder ailments that forced him out of the All Star game and limited him to a total of 25 starts. He spent much of the second-half on the disabled list resting and then rehabbing. He won two games after the All-Star break. Nolan still finished second in the National League in ERA (1.99) to Philadelphia's Steve Carlton (1.97). Morgan (122 runs scored, 16 home runs, 73 RBI, 58 stolen bases, .292 average) finished fourth in MVP voting, while Rose (107 runs, 198 hits, 11 triples, .307 avg.) and reliever Clay Carroll (37 saves, 2.25 ERA) were 12th and 13th, respectively, in the MVP voting conducted by the Baseball Writers' Association of America.

The Reds beat the Pittsburgh Pirates, three games to two, in the 1972 National League Championship Series, the first time in its four-year history the NLCS had gone five games. The World Series against the Oakland A's was also close, with the Reds falling in Game 7, 3–2, the sixth game of the series decided by a single run.

== Off season ==
- November 29, 1971: Lee May, Tommy Helms, and Jimmy Stewart were traded by the Reds to the Houston Astros for Joe Morgan, Ed Armbrister, Jack Billingham, César Gerónimo, and Denis Menke.
- Dec 3, 1971: Wayne Granger was traded by the Reds to the Minnesota Twins for Tom Hall.
- December 14, 1971: Jim Qualls was traded by the Reds to the Chicago White Sox for Pat Jacquez.

== Regular season ==
=== Season standings ===
NL West
Team	W	L	Pct.	GB	Home	Road
Cincinnati Reds	95	59	.617	—	42‍–‍34	53‍–‍25
Houston Astros	84	69	.549	10½	41‍–‍36	43‍–‍33
Los Angeles Dodgers	85	70	.548	10½	41‍–‍34	44‍–‍36
Atlanta Braves	70	84	.455	25	36‍–‍41	34‍–‍43
San Francisco Giants	69	86	.445	26½	34‍–‍43	35‍–‍43
San Diego Padres	58	95	.379	36½	26‍–‍54	32‍–‍41

=== Record vs. opponents ===
1972 National League record Sources:
Team	ATL	CHC	CIN	HOU	LAD	MON	NYM	PHI	PIT	SD	SF	STL
Atlanta	—	5–7–1	9–9	7–7	7–8	4–8	7–5	6–6	6–6	6–11	7–11	6–6
Chicago	7–5–1	—	8–4	3–9	8–4	10–5	10–8	10–7	3–12	9–3	7–5	10–8
Cincinnati	9–9	4–8	—	11–6	9–5	8–4	8–4	10–2	8–4	8–10	10–5	10–2
Houston	7–7	9–3	6–11	—	7–11	8–4	6–6	9–3	3–9	12–2	13–5	4–8
Los Angeles	8–7	4–8	5–9	11–7	—	6–6	7–5	7–5	7–5	13–5	9–9	8–4
Montreal	8–4	5–10	4–8	4–8	6–6	—	6–12	10–6	6–12	6–6	6–6	9–8
New York	5–7	8–10	4–8	6–6	5–7	12–6	—	13–5	8–6	7–5	8–4	7–9
Philadelphia	6-6	7–10	2–10	3–9	5–7	6–10	5–13	—	5–13	6–6	6–6	8–7
Pittsburgh	6–6	12–3	4–8	9–3	5–7	12–6	6–8	13–5	—	10–2	9–3	10–8
San Diego	11–6	3–9	10–8	2–12	5–13	6–6	5–7	6–6	2–10	—	4–10	4–8
San Francisco	11–7	5–7	5–10	5–13	9–9	6–6	4–8	6–6	3–9	10–4	—	5–7
St. Louis	6–6	8–10	2–10	8–4	4–8	8–9	9–7	7–8	8–10	8–4	7–5	—

=== Notable transactions ===
- June 6, 1972: Ron Hassey was drafted by the Reds in the 23rd round of the 1972 Major League Baseball draft, but did not sign.

=== Roster ===
1972 Cincinnati Reds roster
Roster
Pitchers: 43 Jack Billingham; 34 Pedro Borbón; 36 Clay Carroll; 39 Joe Gibbon; 48 Ross Grimsley; 35 Don Gullett; 21 Tom Hall; 31 Jim McGlothlin; 30 Jim Merritt; 38 Gary Nolan; 45 Wayne Simpson; 44 Ed Sprague; 49 Dave Tomlin	Catchers: 5 Johnny Bench; 7 Pat Corrales; 9 Bill Plummer; 7 Sonny Ruberto; Infielders: 12 Darrel Chaney; 13 Dave Concepción; 20,25 Joe Hague; 17 Julián Javier; 16 Denis Menke; 8 Joe Morgan; 24 Tony Pérez	Outfielders: 25 Bernie Carbo; 15 George Foster; 20 César Gerónimo; 11 Hal McRae; 14 Pete Rose; 28 Bobby Tolan; 22 Ted Uhlaender	Manager: 10 Sparky Anderson; Coaches: 2 Alex Grammas; 18 Ted Kluszewski; 3 George Scherger; 4 Larry Shepard

=== Game log ===
1972 Game Log: 95–59 (Home: 42–34; Away: 53–25)
April: 5–8 (Home: 1–3; Away: 4–5)

#	Date	Opponent	Score	Win	Loss	Save	Attendance	Record	Streak
1	April 15	Dodgers	1–3	Sutton (1–0)	Billingham (0–1)	Brewer (1)	37,895	0–1	L1
2	April 16	Dodgers	10–1	Nolan (1–0)	Downing (0–1)	Carroll (1)	16,410	1–1	W1
3	April 18	Astros	4–8	Forsch (1–0)	Gullett (0–1)	Gladding (1)	8,347	1–2	L1
4	April 19	Astros	5–7	Reuss (1–0)	Billingham (0–2)	Culver (1)	6,217	1–3	L2
5	April 21	@ Braves	4–3	Nolan (2–0)	Reed (1–1)	Hall (1)	6,762	2–3	W1
6	April 22	@ Braves	7–11	Jarvis (1–1)	Gullett (0–2)	Nash (1)	10,141	2–4	L1
7	April 23	@ Braves	3–4 (11)	Schueler (1–0)	McGlothlin (0–1)		13,377	2–5	L2
8	April 25	@ Pirates	2–5 (13)	Miller (1–1)	McGlothlin (0–2)		6,509	2–6	L3
9	April 26	@ Pirates	7–6	Nolan (3–0)	Blass (1–1)	Borbón (1)	6,380	3–6	W1
10	April 27	@ Pirates	5–4	Carroll (1–0)	Giusti (0–1)		12,504	4–6	W2
11	April 28	@ Cubs	8–10	Jenkins (1–2)	Billingham (0–3)		12,185	4–7	L1
12	April 29	@ Cubs	3–2	Hall (1–0)	Pappas (1–2)		19,560	5–7	W1
13	April 30	@ Cubs	4–6	Hooton (2–2)	Carroll (1–1)	McGinn (2)	21,924	5–8	L1

May: 18–10 (Home: 7–7; Away: 11–3)

#	Date	Opponent	Score	Win	Loss	Save	Attendance	Record	Streak
14	May 2	@ Cardinals	7–6	Merritt (1–0)	Shaw (0–1)	Hall (2)	11,091	6–8	W2
15	May 3	@ Cardinals	1–2	Cleveland (2–0)	Billingham (0–4)		6,935	6–9	L1
16	May 4	@ Cardinals	9–5	Carroll (2–1)	Santorini (2–2)		9,299	7–9	W1
17	May 5	Pirates	5–4 (10)	Carroll (3–1)	Giusti (0–3)		24,722	8–9	W2
18	May 6	Pirates	1–8	Blass (2–1)	Borbón (0–1)		12,284	8–10	L1
19	May 7	Pirates	6–9	Briles (2–0)	Billingham (0–5)	Moose (1)	19,281	8–11	L2
20	May 9	Cubs	1–7	Jenkins (3–2)	McGlothlin (0–3)		7,906	8–12	L3
21	May 10	Cubs	2–4	Pappas (3–2)	Nolan (3–1)	McGinn (3)	7,051	8–13	L4
22	May 12	Cardinals	5–4	Grimsley (1–0)	Cleveland (3–1)	Carroll (2)	23,376	9–13	W1
23	May 13	Cardinals	11–2	Simpson (1–0)	Clemons (0–1)	Borbón (2)	10,471	10–13	W2
24	May 14	Cardinals	4–3	Gullett (1–2)	Drabowsky (0–1)	Carroll (3)	–	11–13	W3
25	May 14	Cardinals	2–0	Hall (2–0)	Santorini (2–4)		33,486	12–13	W4
26	May 16	@ Giants	4–3	Nolan (4–1)	Bryant (1–3)	Carroll (4)	–	13–13	W5
27	May 16	@ Giants	2–0	Billingham (1–5)	Stone (0–3)		7,571	14–13	W6
28	May 17	@ Giants	2–1	Grimsley (2–0)	Marichal (1–7)	Carroll (5)	2,670	15–13	W7
29	May 18	@ Giants	8–5	Borbón (1–1)	McDowell (5–1)	Carroll (6)	2,847	16–13	W8
30	May 19	@ Padres	1–0	McGlothlin (1–3)	Kirby (3–3)		35,423	17–13	W9
31	May 20	@ Padres	3–5	Arlin (3–3)	Billingham (1–6)	Corkins (2)	8,102	17–14	L1
32	May 21	@ Padres	7–2	Nolan (5–1)	Greif (3–5)		–	18–14	W1
33	May 21	@ Padres	0–7	Norman (4–2)	Hall (2–1)		17,543	18–15	L1
34	May 23	Braves	1–2	Niekro (6–4)	McGlothlin (1–4)		13,784	18–16	L2
35	May 24	Braves	2–4	Kelley (3–4)	Simpson (1–1)	Upshaw (3)	10,156	18–17	L3
36	May 26	Padres	4–0	Nolan (6–1)	Norman (4–3)		15,270	19–17	W1
37	May 27	Padres	9–4	McGlothlin (2–4)	Kirby (3–5)	Carroll (7)	15,055	20–17	W2
38	May 28	Padres	2–5	Arlin (4–4)	Grimsley (2–1)		19,647	20–18	L1
39	May 29	@ Astros	8–3	Simpson (2–1)	Griffin (1–1)	Carroll (8)	14,885	21–18	W1
40	May 30	@ Astros	9–5	Billingham (2–6)	Wilson (3–4)	Carroll (9)	14,539	22–18	W2
41	May 31	@ Astros	12–4	Nolan (7–1)	Roberts (3–3)		15,702	23–18	W3

June: 18–9 (Home: 7–6; Away: 11–3)

#	Date	Opponent	Score	Win	Loss	Save	Attendance	Record	Streak
42	June 1	@ Astros	10–3	Sprague (1–0)	Reuss (3–4)	Borbón (3)	14,466	24–18	W4
43	June 2	@ Phillies	6–3 (17)	Gullett (2–2)	Twitchell (2–1)	Borbón (4)	16,251	25–18	W5
44	June 3	@ Phillies	6–5 (10)	Hall (3–1)	Reynolds (0–2)		16,623	26–18	W6
45	June 4	@ Phillies	2–0	Billingham (3–6)	Champion (3–3)	Carroll (10)	15,861	27–18	W7
46	June 6	@ Mets	2–3	McAndrew (5–1)	Gullett (2–3)	McGraw (9)	29,353	27–19	L1
47	June 7	@ Mets	6–3	McGlothlin (3–4)	Gentry (3–4)	Hall (3)	35,995	28–19	W1
48	June 8	@ Mets	5–3	Borbón (2–1)	Seaver (8–3)	Carroll (11)	35,593	29–19	W2
49	June 9	@ Expos	6–3	Simpson (3–1)	Morton (2–7)	Borbón (5)	11,193	30–19	W3
50	June 11	@ Expos	11–1	Nolan (8–1)	Renko (1–4)		28,589	31–19	W4
51	June 13	Phillies	8–4	Hall (4–1)	Champion (4–4)	Carroll (12)	–	32–19	W5
52	June 13	Phillies	4–2	Grimsley (3–1)	Reynolds (0–3)	Borbón (6)	31,509	33–19	W6
53	June 14	Phillies	2–1	Billingham (4–6)	Lersch (1–3)	Carroll (13)	16,127	34–19	W7
54	June 16	Mets	1–2	Frisella (2–1)	Nolan (8–2)	McGraw (11)	30,709	34–20	L1
55	June 17	Mets	8–2	Simpson (4–1)	Gentry (3–5)	Hall (4)	51,617	35–20	W1
56	June 18	Mets	1–2	Seaver (9–3)	Grimsley (3–2)		33,134	35–21	L1
57	June 19	Expos	0–2	Stoneman (6–5)	Billingham (4–7)		11,145	35–22	L2
58	June 20	Expos	2–7	Morton (3–7)	McGlothlin (3–5)	Marshall (5)	12,287	35–23	L3
59	June 21	Expos	6–4	Nolan (9–2)	Renko (1–6)	Carroll (14)	11,892	36–23	W1
60	June 22	Astros	5–9	Culver (2–0)	Simpson (4–2)	Ray (6)	22,164	36–24	L1
61	June 23	Astros	7–1	Grimsley (4–2)	Reuss (5–6)		20,401	37–24	W1
62	June 24	Astros	1–4	Dierker (7–4)	Billingham (4–8)		31,907	37–25	L1
63	June 25	Astros	5–4 (10)	Carroll (4–1)	Gladding (1–3)		30,019	38–25	W1
64	June 26	@ Dodgers	5–0	Nolan (10–2)	Osteen (7–5)		33,130	39–25	W2
65	June 27	@ Dodgers	5–4	Gullett (3–3)	Downing (4–4)	Carroll (15)	27,395	40–25	W3
66	June 28	@ Giants	4–2	Grimsley (5–2)	Carrithers (2–5)	Hall (5)	5,828	41–25	W4
67	June 29	@ Giants	2–3	Barr (1–2)	Billingham (4–9)		6,337	41–26	L1
68	June 30	@ Padres	3–4 (13)	Norman (5–6)	Borbón (2–2)		6,119	41–27	L2

July: 16–10 (Home: 7–8; Away: 9–2)

#	Date	Opponent	Score	Win	Loss	Save	Attendance	Record	Streak
69	July 1	@ Padres	3–2	Sprague (2–0)	Arlin (7–8)	Billingham (1)	24,972	42–27	W1
70	July 2	@ Padres	12–2	Nolan (11–2)	Corkins (0–4)	Carroll (16)	12,754	43–27	W2
71	July 3	Cardinals	2–4	Wise (9–7)	Gullett (3–4)		30,830	43–28	L1
72	July 4	Cardinals	6–1	Grimsley (6–2)	Spinks (5–5)		15,729	44–28	W1
73	July 7	Cubs	1–2	Hooton (7–7)	Simpson (4–3)	Aker (3)	40,042	44–29	L1
74	July 8	Cubs	3–2	Nolan (12–2)	Reuschel (3–1)	Carroll (17)	47,310	45–29	W1
75	July 9	Cubs	0–5	Jenkins (11–7)	Gullett (3–5)		–	45–30	L1
76	July 9	Cubs	5–10	Pappas (6–5)	Grimsley (6–3)		52,116	45–31	L2
77	July 11	Pirates	5–0	Billingham (5–9)	Moose (5–5)		24,047	46–31	W1
78	July 12	Pirates	6–3	Simpson (5–3)	Walker (3–5)	Carroll (18)	28,058	47–31	W2
79	July 13	Pirates	2–0	Nolan (13–2)	Blass (10–3)	Carroll (19)	32,060	48–31	W3
80	July 14	@ Cardinals	6–3	Grimsley (7–3)	Wise (9–9)	Carroll (20)	22,849	49–31	W4
81	July 15	@ Cardinals	12–2	McGlothlin (4–5)	Santorini (4–7)	Hall (6)	35,094	50–31	W5
82	July 16	@ Cardinals	4–1	Billingham (6–9)	Durham (0–1)		32,760	51–31	W6
83	July 17	@ Cubs	7–2	Simpson (6–3)	Reuschel (3–3)	Carroll (21)	20,420	52–31	W7
84	July 18	@ Cubs	1–2 (10)	Jenkins (12–8)	Carroll (4–2)		16,716	52–32	L1
85	July 19	@ Cubs	6–1	Grimsley (8–3)	Pappas (6–6)		31,475	53–32	W1
86	July 21	@ Pirates	11–5	Borbón (3–2)	Kison (4–3)	Gullett (1)	32,255	54–32	W2
87	July 22	@ Pirates	6–3	Sprague (3–0)	Moose (5–6)	Carroll (22)	40,837	55–32	W3
88	July 23	@ Pirates	2–3	Blass (11–4)	Grimsley (8–4)	R. Hernández (6)	29,487	55–33	L1
ASG	July 25	All-Star Game	AL 3–4 NL	McGraw (1–0)	McNally (0–1)		53,107		
89	July 27	Padres	8–2	Billingham (7–9)	Arlin (8–12)		21,852	56–33	W1
90	July 28	Padres	1–3	Kirby (7–11)	Simpson (6–4)		21,728	56–34	L1
91	July 29	Padres	3–4 (17)	Acosta (2–5)	Sprague (3–1)	Schaeffer (1)	33,094	56–35	L2
92	July 30	Giants	4–0	Grimsley (9–4)	Marichal (4–11)		–	57–35	W1
93	July 30	Giants	1–6 (10)	Barr (4–3)	Carroll (4–3)		48,351	57–36	L1
94	July 31	Giants	2–7	Carrithers (3–6)	Billingham (7–10)		18,458	57–37	L2

August: 21–9 (Home: 10–4; Away: 11–5)

#	Date	Opponent	Score	Win	Loss	Save	Attendance	Record	Streak
95	August 1	@ Astros	3–1	Simpson (7–4)	Culver (3–2)		31,405	58–37	W1
96	August 2	@ Astros	1–10	Wilson (7–7)	Nolan (13–3)		31,838	58–38	L1
97	August 4	Braves	6–5 (11)	Carroll (5–3)	Jarvis (9–5)		–	59–38	W1
98	August 4	Braves	3–2	Grimsley (10–4)	McLain (2–2)	Gullett (2)	42,385	60–38	W2
99	August 5	Braves	4–2	Borbón (4–2)	Schueler (4–6)	Carroll (23)	36,792	61–38	W3
100	August 6	Braves	3–4 (10)	Niekro (10–10)	Gullett (3–6)		29,149	61–39	L1
101	August 7	Braves	9–1	McGlothlin (5–5)	Reed (9–11)		20,150	62–39	W1
102	August 8	Dodgers	2–1 (19)	Borbón (5–2)	Mikkelsen (3–5)		24,453	63–39	W2
103	August 9	Dodgers	6–3	Hall (5–1)	Singer (4–11)	Carroll (24)	26,146	64–39	W3
104	August 10	Dodgers	2–6	Osteen (13–8)	Gullett (3–7)	Brewer (13)	28,279	64–40	L1
105	August 11	@ Braves	5–7	Upshaw (2–5)	Carroll (5–4)	Hardin (2)	13,268	64–41	L2
106	August 12	@ Braves	2–7	Reed (10–11)	Grimsley (10–5)		26,857	64–42	L3
107	August 13	@ Braves	9–4	Borbón (6–2)	McLain (3–3)		20,219	65–42	W1
108	August 14	@ Braves	12–2	Billingham (8–10)	Stone (4–9)		15,318	66–42	W2
109	August 15	@ Phillies	3–0	Gullett (4–7)	Twitchell (2–4)		17,106	67–42	W3
110	August 16	@ Phillies	8–2	McGlothlin (6–5)	Reynolds (0–10)	Borbón (7)	10,385	68–42	W4
111	August 17	@ Phillies	4–9	Carlton (20–6)	Grimsley (10–6)		42,635	68–43	L1
112	August 18	@ Mets	8–2	Hall (6–1)	Koosman (8–9)	Borbón (8)	47,957	69–43	W1
113	August 19	@ Mets	5–0	Billingham (9–10)	Strom (0–1)		43,257	70–43	W2
114	August 20	@ Mets	8–1	Gullett (5–7)	McAndrew (9–4)	Carroll (25)	42,555	71–43	W3
115	August 21	@ Expos	4–1	McGlothlin (7–5)	Torrez (13–9)		21,080	72–43	W4
116	August 22	@ Expos	5–3	Grimsley (11–6)	Morton (5–11)	Borbón (9)	19,712	73–43	W5
117	August 23	@ Expos	0–11	Moore (5–6)	Simpson (7–5)		13,804	73–44	L1
118	August 24	@ Expos	6–0	Billingham (10–10)	McAnally (2–14)		14,241	74–44	W1
119	August 25	Phillies	6–1	Gullett (6–7)	Reynolds (0–10)		32,017	75–44	W2
120	August 26	Phillies	3–4	Carlton (21–7)	McGlothlin (7–6)	Scarce (2)	34,028	75–45	L1
121	August 27	Phillies	7–2	Grimsley (12–6)	Twitchell (3–6)	Borbón (10)	37,167	76–45	W1
122	August 28	Mets	5–2	Nolan (14–3)	Strom (0–2)	Hall (7)	18,508	77–45	W2
123	August 29	Mets	0–3	McAndrew (10–5)	Billingham (10–11)	McGraw (19)	22,114	77–46	L1
124	August 30	Mets	4–2	Gullett (7–7)	Matlack (11–8)	Hall (8)	22,008	78–46	W1

September: 14–13 (Home: 7–6; Away: 7–7)

#	Date	Opponent	Score	Win	Loss	Save	Attendance	Record	Streak
125	September 1	Expos	1–0 (10)	Carroll (6–4)	Stoneman (10–10)		13,500	79–46	W2
126	September 2	Expos	2–7	Torrez (14–9)	Nolan (14–4)	Marshall (15)	20,569	79–47	L1
127	September 3	Expos	4–3	Hall (7–1)	Moore (6–7)		15,464	80–47	W1
128	September 4	@ Dodgers	5–6	Brewer (8–6)	Sprague (3–2)		–	80–48	L1
129	September 4	@ Dodgers	8–4	Gullett (8–7)	Osteen (15–10)	Borbón (11)	40,366	81–48	W1
130	September 5	@ Dodgers	4–9	Sutton (15–9)	Grimsley (12–7)		18,155	81–49	L1
131	September 6	@ Dodgers	6–3	Simpson (8–5)	Downing (8–7)	Carroll (26)	16,965	82–49	W1
132	September 7	@ Padres	0–2	Caldwell (7–8)	Nolan (14–5)		–	82–50	L1
133	September 7	@ Padres	1–5	Norman (8–9)	Billingham (10–12)		5,396	82–51	L2
134	September 9	@ Giants	1–2	Willoughby (5–2)	Gullett (8–8)		6,199	82–52	L3
135	September 10	@ Giants	8–7	Hall (8–1)	Moffitt (1–4)	Carroll (27)	–	83–52	W1
136	September 10	@ Giants	2–8	Marichal (6–15)	McGlothlin (7–7)	Johnson (8)	13,584	83–53	L1
137	September 12	@ Braves	7–5	Borbón (7–2)	McLain (3–5)	Carroll (28)	4,050	84–53	W1
138	September 13	@ Braves	8–6 (10)	Hall (9–1)	Hoerner (1–5)		3,141	85–53	W2
139	September 15	Padres	0–1	Norman (9–9)	Gullett (8–9)		14,021	85–54	L1
140	September 16	Padres	6–3	Grimsley (13–7)	Corkins (6–9)	Carroll (29)	20,571	86–54	W1
141	September 17	Padres	7–10	Schaeffer (1–0)	Sprague (3–3)	Simpson (1)	18,300	86–55	L1
142	September 18	Giants	2–0	McGlothlin (8–7)	Barr (7–9)	Carroll (30)	8,608	87–55	W1
143	September 19	Giants	5–4	Borbón (8–2)	Marichal (6–16)	Carroll (31)	10,353	88–55	W2
144	September 20	Giants	8–6	Hall (10–1)	Sosa (0–1)	Carroll (32)	11,174	89–55	W3
145	September 22	@ Astros	4–3	Grimsley (14–7)	Dierker (15–8)	Carroll (33)	15,490	90–55	W4
146	September 23	@ Astros	1–7	Wilson (14–9)	McGlothlin (8–8)		16,657	90–56	L1
147	September 24	@ Astros	10–2	Billingham (11–12)	Forsch (5–7)	Carroll (34)	12,709	91–56	W1
148	September 26	Braves	9–10	Hardin (5–2)	Gullett (8–10)	Upshaw (13)	7,234	91–57	L1
149	September 27	Braves	5–8	Niekro (16–11)	Grimsley (14–8)		7,033	91–58	L2
150	September 29	Dodgers	4–1	Billingham (12–12)	Downing (9–9)	Carroll (35)	14,454	92–58	W1
151	September 30	Dodgers	2–4 (10)	Osteen (19–11)	Borbón (8–3)		20,080	92–59	L1

October: 3–10 (Home: 3–0; Away: 0–0)

#	Date	Opponent	Score	Win	Loss	Save	Attendance	Record	Streak
152	October 1	Dodgers	1–0	Gullett (9–10)	Rau (2–2)	Carroll (36)	40,046	93–59	W1
153	October 3	Astros	6–1	Nolan (15–5)	Forsch (6–8)	Grimsley (1)	10,069	94–59	W2
154	October 4	Astros	4–2	McGlothlin (9–8)	Cosgrove (0–1)	Carroll (37)	10,079	95–59	W3

== Player stats ==
=== Batting ===
==== Starters by position ====
Note: Pos = Position; G = Games played; AB = At bats; H = Hits; Avg. = Batting average; HR = Home runs; RBI = Runs batted in

Pos	Player	G	AB	H	Avg.	HR	RBI
C	Johnny Bench	147	538	145	.270	40	125
1B	Tony Perez	136	515	146	.283	21	90
2B	Joe Morgan	149	552	161	.292	16	73
SS	Dave Concepción	119	378	79	.209	2	29
3B	Denis Menke	140	447	104	.233	9	50
LF	Pete Rose	154	645	198	.307	6	57
CF	Bobby Tolan	149	604	171	.283	8	82
RF	César Gerónimo	120	255	70	.275	4	29

==== Other batters ====
Note: G = Games played; AB = At bats; H = Hits; Avg. = Batting average; HR = Home runs; RBI = Runs batted in

Player	G	AB	H	Avg.	HR	RBI
Darrel Chaney	83	196	48	.250	2	19
George Foster	59	145	29	.200	2	12
Joe Hague	69	138	34	.246	4	20
Ted Uhlaender	73	113	18	.159	0	6
Bill Plummer	38	102	19	.186	2	9
Hal McRae	61	97	27	.278	5	26
Julián Javier	44	91	19	.209	2	12
Bernie Carbo	19	21	3	.143	0	0
Sonny Ruberto	2	3	0	.000	0	0
Pat Corrales	2	1	0	.000	0	0

=== Pitching ===
==== Starting pitchers ====
Note: G = Games pitched; GS = Games started; IP = Innings pitched; W = Wins; L = Losses; ERA = Earned run average; SO = Strikeouts

Player	G	GS	IP	W	L	ERA	SO
Jack Billingham	36	31	217.2	12	12	3.18	137
Ross Grimsley	30	28	197.2	14	8	3.05	79
Gary Nolan	25	25	176.0	15	5	1.99	90
Jim McGlothlin	31	21	145.0	9	8	3.91	69
Wayne Simpson	24	22	130.1	8	5	4.14	70

==== Other pitchers ====
Note: G = Games pitched; IP = Innings pitched; W = Wins; L = Losses; ERA = Earned run average; SO = Strikeouts

Player	G	IP	W	L	ERA	SO
Don Gullett	31	134.2	9	10	3.94	96
Jim Merritt	4	8.0	1	0	4.50	4

==== Relief pitchers ====
Note: G = Games pitched; W = Wins; L = Losses; ERA = Earned run average; SO = Strikeouts; SV = Saves

Player	G	W	L	ERA	SO	SV
Clay Carroll	65	6	4	2.25	51	37
Pedro Borbón	62	8	3	3.17	48	11
Tom Hall	47	10	1	2.61	134	8
Ed Sprague	33	3	3	4.13	25	0
Dave Tomlin	3	0	0	9.00	2	0
Joe Gibbon	2	0	0	54.00	1	0

== Postseason ==
=== 1972 National League Championship Series ===
The Reds rallied to defeat the Pittsburgh Pirates in five games to win the National League title. In Game 5, Johnny Bench's ninth-inning home run tied the game before George Foster scored the game-winner on a wild pitch by Pirates' reliever Bob Moose.

==== Game 1 ====
October 7: Three Rivers Stadium, Pittsburgh, Pennsylvania

Team	1	2	3	4	5	6	7	8	9	R	H	E
Cincinnati	1	0	0	0	0	0	0	0	0	1	8	0
Pittsburgh	3	0	0	0	2	0	0	0	X	5	6	0
W: Steve Blass (1–0) L: Don Gullett (0–1) S: Ramón Hernández (1)
HR: CIN – Joe Morgan (1) PIT – Al Oliver (1)
Pitchers: CIN – Gullett, Borbón (7) PIT – Blass, Hernández (9)
Attendance: 50,476

==== Game 2 ====
October 8: Three Rivers Stadium, Pittsburgh, Pennsylvania

Team	1	2	3	4	5	6	7	8	9	R	H	E
Cincinnati	4	0	0	0	0	0	0	1	0	5	8	1
Pittsburgh	0	0	0	1	1	1	0	0	0	3	7	1
W: Tom Hall (1–0) L: Bob Moose (0–1) S: None
HR: CIN – Joe Morgan (2) PIT – none
Pitchers: CIN – Billingham, Hall (5) PIT – Moose, Johnson (1), Kison (6), Hernández (7), Giusti (9)
Attendance: 50,584

==== Game 3 ====
October 9: Riverfront Stadium, Cincinnati

Team	1	2	3	4	5	6	7	8	9	R	H	E
Pittsburgh	0	0	0	0	1	0	1	1	0	3	7	0
Cincinnati	0	0	2	0	0	0	0	0	0	2	8	1
W: Bruce Kison (1–0) L: Clay Carroll (0–1) S: Dave Giusti (1)
HR: PIT – Manny Sanguillén (1) CIN – none
Pitchers: PIT – Briles, Kison (7), Giusti (8) CIN – Nolan, Borbón (7), Carroll (7), McGlothlin (9)
Attendance: 52,420

==== Game 4 ====
October 10: Riverfront Stadium, Cincinnati

Team	1	2	3	4	5	6	7	8	9	R	H	E
Pittsburgh	0	0	0	0	0	0	1	0	0	1	2	3
Cincinnati	1	0	0	2	0	2	2	0	0	7	11	1
W: Ross Grimsley (1–0) L: Dock Ellis (0–1) S: none
HR: PIT – Roberto Clemente (1) CIN – none
Pitchers: PIT – Ellis, Johnson (6), Walker (7), Miller (8) CIN – Grimsley
Attendance: 39,447

==== Game 5 ====
October 11: Riverfront Stadium, Cincinnati

Team	1	2	3	4	5	6	7	8	9	R	H	E
Pittsburgh	0	2	0	1	0	0	0	0	0	3	8	0
Cincinnati	0	0	1	0	1	0	0	0	2	4	7	1
W: Clay Carroll (1–1) L: Dave Giusti (0–1) S: none
HR: PIT – none CIN – César Gerónimo (1), Johnny Bench (1)
Pitchers: PIT – Blass, Hernández (8), Giusti (9), Moose (9) CIN – Gullett, Borbón (4), Hall (6), Carroll (9)
Attendance: 41,887

=== 1972 World Series ===
The Reds were a prohibitive favorite to win the World Series over the Oakland Athletics, who lost top slugger Reggie Jackson to a hamstring injury in the playoffs. But Gene Tenace, who hit just five home runs in the regular season, crushed four against the Reds in a series that saw six of the seven games decided by one run. Oakland dealt the Reds three losses on their home AstroTurf of Riverfront Stadium. Tenace had two hits and two RBI in Game 7 as Oakland scored two in the sixth inning and held on for a 3–2 victory for the A's first World Series title since 1930.

AL Oakland Athletics (4) vs. NL Cincinnati Reds (3)
Game	Score	Date	Location	Attendance	Time of Game
1	A's – 3, Reds – 2	October 14	Riverfront Stadium	52,918	2:18
2	A's – 2, Reds – 1	October 15	Riverfront Stadium	53,224	2:26
3	Reds – 1, A's – 0	October 18	Oakland–Alameda County Coliseum	49,410	2:24
4	Reds – 2, A's – 3	October 19	Oakland–Alameda County Coliseum	49,410	2:06
5	Reds – 5, A's – 4	October 20	Oakland–Alameda County Coliseum	49,410	2:26
6	A's – 1, Reds – 8	October 21	Riverfront Stadium	52,737	2:21
7	A's – 3, Reds – 2	October 22	Riverfront Stadium	56,040	2:50

== Awards and honors ==
- Sparky Anderson, Associated Press NL Manager of the Year
- Johnny Bench, National League MVP
- Bobby Tolan, Hutch Award

== Farm system ==
Level	Team	League	Manager
AAA	Indianapolis Indians	American Association	Vern Rapp
AA	Trois-Rivières Aigles	Eastern League	Jim Snyder
A	Tampa Tarpons	Florida State League	Russ Nixon
Rookie	Melbourne Reds	Florida East Coast League	Dave Pavlesic
Rookie	GCL Reds	Gulf Coast League	Ron Plaza

LEAGUE CHAMPIONS: Melbourne Reds
