= 1973 Cincinnati Reds season =

1973 Cincinnati Reds
- National League West champions
- League: National League
- Division: West
- Ballpark: Riverfront Stadium
- City: Cincinnati
- Record: 99–63 (.611)
- Divisional place: 1st
- Owners: Louis Nippert
- General managers: Bob Howsam
- Managers: Sparky Anderson
- Television: WLWT (Charlie Jones, Wes Parker)
- Radio: WLW (Al Michaels, Joe Nuxhall)

The 1973 Cincinnati Reds season was the 104th season for the franchise in Major League Baseball, and their 4th and 3rd full season at Riverfront Stadium in Cincinnati. The Reds won the National League West with a Major League-best record of 99–63, 3 1/2 games ahead of the Los Angeles Dodgers, before losing the NLCS to the New York Mets in five games. The Reds were managed by Sparky Anderson, and played their home games at Riverfront Stadium.

The season started well but entered a slump, which ended on July 1, 1973, when third-string catcher Hal King hit a season-changing home run, pinch-hitting a walk off home run in the bottom of the ninth with the score at 3-1 Dodgers, two on base, and the count at 2 balls and 2 strikes. The play was credited with turning the season around, and the Reds ended the season by winning the division. The Cincinnati Enquirer called the home run one of the most dramatic in Reds history.

== Offseason ==
The Reds were coming off a devastating loss in seven games to the underdog Oakland Athletics in the 1972 World Series. The offseason did not start well for the Reds. In the winter, a growth was removed from the lung of Cincinnati's star catcher, Johnny Bench. While Bench played the entire 1973 season, his power numbers dropped from 40 home runs in 1972 to 25 in '73. He never again reached the 40 homer mark, something he accomplished in two of the three seasons prior to the surgery. Looking to expand their catching lineup due to questions about Bench, the Reds traded the Rangers Jim Merritt for Hal King. King became the Reds' third string catcher, playing behind starter and future Baseball Hall of Famer Bench and second stringer Bill Plummer.

== Early season ==
Coming into the season, the defending NL Champion Reds were still favored to win the strong NL West against the likes of the Houston Astros, the Los Angeles Dodgers, and the San Francisco Giants. The Reds' lineup returned virtually intact, with the exception of third base where the Reds tried to make a third baseman out of rookie Dan Driessen, a solid hitter (.301 average) who had played mostly first base in the minor leagues. With Tony Pérez fully entrenched at first base, the Reds wanted to get Driessen's bat in the lineup and his playing time was at the expense of the anemic hitting Denis Menke (.191), although the Reds were sacrificing defense with Driessen at the hot corner. The other change was at shortstop, where Dave Concepción emerged from a 1972 timeshare with Darrel Chaney to full-time starter, finally realizing his potential in his fourth year in the majors. Concepción was outstanding both at bat and in the field and was named to the NL All-Star team. But two days before the mid-summer classic on July 22, in a game against the Montreal Expos, Concepción broke his ankle sliding into third base after moving from first base on a Menke base hit, and missed the second half of the season. Concepción was batting .287, with eight home runs, 46 RBI, 39 runs scored and 22 stolen bases, all career highs despite missing almost half the season.

The Reds had other hurdles to overcome. Cincinnati's pitching ace, Gary Nolan (15–5, 1.99 ERA in '72), suffered from a sore arm that limited him to two starts and 10 innings pitched before it was discovered he had a torn ligament in his right elbow. The injury would force Nolan to also miss the entire 1974 season. There was also an issue with centerfielder Bobby Tolan. He slumped badly to .206, became a malcontent, and had several squabbles with members of Reds management, who were still unhappy with his 1971 basketball injury that cost him that season as well as Tolan's error in Game 7 of the 1972 World Series against Oakland that was arguably the key play in that game. Tolan went AWOL for two days in August 1973, and broke team rules by growing a beard. On September 27, the team suspended Tolan for the remainder of the season, including the NLCS.

The Reds started well, and were 25–16 about a quarter of the way through the season and led the second-place Dodgers by 1 1/2 games on May 23. But with Tolan, Menke and Bench mired in slumps and some of the Reds starting pitchers struggling, the Reds began to flounder. Reds general manager Bob Howsam determined the Reds offense would eventually come around, but the pitching staff needed help. With Nolan sidelined indefinitely and starters Jim McGlothlin (ineffectiveness) and Roger Nelson (injuries) struggling, Howsam traded for San Diego Padres left-hander Fred Norman on June 12. At the time of the trade, the 5-foot-8 lefty was 1–7 for the last-place Padres, but Norman would go 12–6 in 24 starts for the Reds to provide a major boost.

== Hal King's season-changing home run ==
On July 1, 1973, the Reds were in a slump and trailing their National League Western Division rivals the Los Angeles Dodgers by 11 games in the standings; they had lost the previous night's game 8–7 in the 13th inning after starting with a 5–1 lead. The first game of a Dodgers double header at home was 3–1 Dodgers in the bottom of the ninth with two on base. Hal King, who had had only a single hit in his 10 at-bats for the Reds, was nevertheless known as a power hitter, and he had hit a grand slam against Don Sutton's screwball previously while playing for the Braves. After the Dodgers intentionally walked pinch-hitter Bench (who represented the tying run) to get to Plummer, Reds Manager Sparky Anderson countered by sending up King to hit for Plummer.

The count was two balls and two strikes when King hit a walk-off home run, again against Sutton's screwball. King tore his cleats with the force of the hit. In the moment, Reds play-by-play announcer Al Michaels predicted, "Boy, I tell you, if anything can turn a season around it is that play right there." King's home run was cited by Anderson as a turning point in the season. He told the Cincinnati Enquirer, “It was one of those things that when it happens you immediately think, ‘This is going to turn us around.' ” In 2019 the Enquirer called it "one of the most dramatic home runs in franchise history". According to Sports Illustrated, after King's hit, "[the Reds'] drive became a relentless thing" and "[Pete] Rose and most of the Reds consider [the game] they played on July 1 against Los Angeles as the turning point of their season.

Starting with the win on King's home run, the Reds gained momentum. They won the second game of the double header when Tony Pérez singled in the game-winner off knuckleball specialist Charlie Hough in the bottom of the 10th as the Reds won 3–2. They won against the Dodgers again the following day, won eight of their next nine games; by July 10, they had cut the Dodgers' lead to 4 1/2 games.

== Late season ==
Both teams stayed close throughout the season, but on Aug. 29, the Reds beat Pittsburgh, 5–3, to begin a seven-game winning streak. After losing two to the Braves, the Reds began another seven-game winning streak to gain some space between the Dodgers. Los Angeles came into Cincinnati for a two-game series, Sept. 11–12, trailing the Reds by 3 games with 18 left on the schedule. A two-run home run by rookie Ken Griffey was the big hit in the Reds' 6–3 victory on Sept. 11, and the Reds completed the sweep the next day as Jack Billingham hurled a complete-game and, the typically poor hitter (.065 average), also belted a bases-clearing double off LA starter Claude Osteen in a 7–3 victory. The Dodgers left Cincinnati trailing by five games. On Sept. 24, the Reds beat San Diego, 2–1, to clinch their second-straight division title and third in four years. It sent the Reds to the 1973 NLCS against the New York Mets.

The Reds offense was led by Pete Rose (team-record 230 hits, 115 runs scored, an NL best .338 batting average), Joe Morgan (116 runs, 26 home runs, 82 RBI, 67 stolen bases, .290 avg.) and Perez (.314, 27, 101). Rose was voted the National League MVP, while Morgan finished fourth and Perez seventh in a vote by the Baseball Writers' Association of America.

Jack Billingham emerged as the staff ace, leading the National League in both innings pitched (293.1) and shutouts (7) to go with 19 victories, while young lefty Don Gullett won 11 of his last 12 decisions to finish 18–8.

Future stars Griffey and George Foster also played well in short stays with the Reds. Griffey batted .384 in 86 at bats in his major league debut, while Foster hit .282 and smacked four home runs in just 39 at bats. Journeyman third-string catcher Hal King also emerged as an unsung hero. King hit three pinch hit home runs, all of which either tied or won games late including a three-run home run off Los Angeles Dodger starter Don Sutton on July 1 to win a game for the Reds.

== Offseason ==
- November 27, 1972: Nardi Contreras was drafted from the Reds by the New York Mets in the 1972 minor league draft.
- November 30, 1972: Hal McRae and Wayne Simpson were traded by the Reds to the Kansas City Royals for Roger Nelson and Richie Scheinblum.
- December 1, 1972: the Rangers traded Hal King with Jim Driscoll to the Reds for Jim Merritt.
- March 27, 1973: Mel Behney was traded by the Reds to the Boston Red Sox for Andy Kosco and Phil Gagliano.

=== Season standings ===
NL West
Team	W	L	Pct.	GB	Home	Road
Cincinnati Reds	99	63	.611	—	50‍–‍31	49‍–‍32
Los Angeles Dodgers	95	66	.590	3½	50‍–‍31	45‍–‍35
San Francisco Giants	88	74	.543	11	47‍–‍34	41‍–‍40
Houston Astros	82	80	.506	17	41‍–‍40	41‍–‍40
Atlanta Braves	76	85	.472	22½	40‍–‍40	36‍–‍45
San Diego Padres	60	102	.370	39	31‍–‍50	29‍–‍52

=== Record vs. opponents ===
1973 National League record Sources:
Team	ATL	CHC	CIN	HOU	LAD	MON	NYM	PHI	PIT	SD	SF	STL
Atlanta	—	7–5	5–13	11–7	2–15–1	6–6	6–6	6–6	7–5	12–6	8–10	6–6
Chicago	5–7	—	8–4	6–6	5–7	9–9	10–7	10–8	6–12	7–5	2–10	9–9
Cincinnati	13–5	4–8	—	11–7	11–7	8–4	8–4	8–4	7–5	13–5	10–8	6–6
Houston	7–11	6–6	7–11	—	11–7	6–6	6–6	7–5	6–6	10–8	11–7	5–7
Los Angeles	15–2–1	7–5	7–11	7–11	—	7–5	7–5	9–3	10–2	9–9	9–9	8–4
Montreal	6–6	9–9	4–8	6–6	5–7	—	9–9	13–5	6–12	7–5	6–6	8–10
New York	6–6	7–10	4–8	6–6	5–7	9–9	—	9–9	13–5	8–4	5–7	10–8
Philadelphia	6–6	8–10	4–8	5–7	3–9	5–13	9–9	—	8–10	9–3	5–7	9–9
Pittsburgh	5–7	12–6	5–7	6–6	2–10	12–6	5–13	10–8	—	8–4	5–7	10–8
San Diego	6–12	5–7	5–13	8–10	9–9	5–7	4–8	3–9	4–8	—	7–11	4–8
San Francisco	10–8	10–2	8–10	7–11	9–9	6–6	7–5	7–5	7–5	11–7	—	6–6
St. Louis	6–6	9–9	6–6	7–5	4–8	10–8	8–10	9–9	8–10	8–4	6–6	—

=== Notable transactions ===
- June 12, 1973: Gene Locklear and Mike Johnson were traded by the Reds to the San Diego Padres for Fred Norman.

=== Roster ===
1973 Cincinnati Reds
Roster
Pitchers: 44 Dick Baney; 43 Jack Billingham; 34 Pedro Borbón; 36 Clay Carroll; 48 Ross Grimsley; 35 Don Gullett; 21 Tom Hall; 31 Jim McGlothlin; 45 Roger Nelson; 38 Gary Nolan; 32 Fred Norman; 44 Ed Sprague; 49 Dave Tomlin	Catchers: 6 Bob Barton; 5 Johnny Bench; 6 Hal King; 9 Bill Plummer; Infielders: 12 Darrel Chaney; 13 Dave Concepción; 17 Ed Crosby; 22 Dan Driessen; 15,16 Phil Gagliano; 11,16 Denis Menke; 8 Joe Morgan; 24 Tony Pérez	Outfielders: 33 Ed Armbrister; 15 George Foster; 20 César Gerónimo; 30 Ken Griffey; 25 Joe Hague; 23 Andy Kosco; 27 Gene Locklear; 14 Pete Rose; 26 Richie Scheinblum; 29 Larry Stahl; 28 Bobby Tolan	Manager: 10 Sparky Anderson; Coaches: 2 Alex Grammas; 18 Ted Kluszewski; 3 George Scherger; 4 Larry Shepard

== Player stats ==
=== Batting ===
==== Starters by position ====
Note: Pos = Position; G = Games played; AB = At bats; H = Hits; Avg. = Batting average; HR = Home runs; RBI = Runs batted in

Pos	Player	G	AB	H	Avg.	HR	RBI
C	Johnny Bench	152	557	141	.253	25	104
1B	Tony Pérez	151	564	177	.314	27	101
2B	Joe Morgan	157	576	167	.290	26	82
3B	Dan Driessen	102	366	49	.301	4	47
SS	Dave Concepción	89	328	94	.287	8	46
LF	Pete Rose	160	680	230	.338	5	64
RF	César Gerónimo	139	324	68	.210	4	33
CF	Bobby Tolan	129	457	94	.206	9	51

==== Other batters ====
Note: G = Games played; AB = At bats; H = Hits; Avg. = Batting average; HR = Home runs; RBI = Runs batted in

Player	G	AB	H	Avg.	HR	RBI
Denis Menke	139	241	46	.191	3	26
Darrel Chaney	105	227	41	.181	0	14
Bill Plummer	50	119	18	.151	2	11
Andy Kosco	47	118	33	.280	9	21
Larry Stahl	76	111	25	.225	2	12
Ken Griffey	25	86	33	.384	3	14
Phil Gagliano	63	69	20	.290	0	7
Richie Scheinblum	29	54	12	.222	1	8
Ed Crosby	36	51	11	.216	0	5
Hal King	35	43	8	.186	4	10
George Foster	17	39	11	.282	4	9
Ed Armbrister	18	37	8	.216	1	5
Joe Hague	19	33	5	.152	0	1
Gene Locklear	29	26	5	.192	0	0
Bob Barton	3	1	0	.000	0	0

=== Pitching ===
==== Starting pitchers ====
Note: G = Games pitched; IP = Innings pitched; W = Wins; L = Losses; ERA = Earned run average; SO = Strikeouts

Player	G	IP	W	L	ERA	SO
Jack Billingham	40	293.1	19	10	3.04	155
Ross Grimsley	38	242.1	13	10	3.23	90
Don Gullett	45	228.1	18	8	3.51	153
Fred Norman	24	166.1	12	6	3.30	112
Gary Nolan	2	10.1	0	1	3.48	3

==== Other pitchers ====
Note: G = Games pitched; IP = Innings pitched; W = Wins; L = Losses; ERA = Earned run average; SO = Strikeouts

Player	G	IP	W	L	ERA	SO
Jim McGlothlin	24	63.1	3	3	6.68	18
Roger Nelson	14	54.2	3	2	3.46	17

==== Relief pitchers ====
Note: G = Games pitched; W = Wins; L = Losses; SV = Saves; ERA = Earned run average; SO = Strikeouts

Player	G	W	L	SV	ERA	SO
Pedro Borbón	80	11	4	14	2.16	60
Clay Carroll	53	8	8	14	3.69	41
Tom Hall	54	8	5	8	3.47	96
Ed Sprague	28	1	3	1	5.12	19
Dave Tomlin	16	1	2	1	4.88	20
Dick Baney	11	2	1	2	2.93	17

== 1973 National League Championship Series ==
The Reds lost the National League Championship Series to the Mets 3 games to 2 despite heroics by Rose and Bench in Game 1 and Rose again in Game 4. Rose's eighth-inning home run against Tom Seaver tied the score at 1–1 and Bench won it in the 9th with another solo home run. Rose also hit a game-winning home run in the 12th-inning to tie the series at 2–2. During Game Three of the series, Rose got into a fight with the popular Mets shortstop Bud Harrelson while trying to break up a double play; the fight resulted in a bench-clearing brawl. The umpires threatened the Mets with forfeiting the game, after fans responded by hurling garbage from the stands at Rose, causing the Reds team to leave the field until order was restored.

=== Game 1 ===
October 6: Riverfront Stadium, Cincinnati

Team	1	2	3	4	5	6	7	8	9	R	H	E
New York	0	1	0	0	0	0	0	0	0	1	3	0
Cincinnati	0	0	0	0	0	0	0	1	1	2	6	0
W: Pedro Borbón (1–0) L: Tom Seaver (0–1) S: None
HR: NYM – None CIN – Pete Rose (1), Johnny Bench (1)
Pitchers: NYM – Seaver CIN – Billingham, Hall (9), Borbón (9)
Attendance: 53,431

=== Game 2 ===
October 7: Riverfront Stadium, Cincinnati

Team	1	2	3	4	5	6	7	8	9	R	H	E
New York	0	0	0	1	0	0	0	0	4	5	7	0
Cincinnati	0	0	0	0	0	0	0	0	0	0	2	0
W: Jon Matlack (1–0) L: Don Gullett (0–1) S: None
HR: NYM – Rusty Staub (1) CIN – None
Pitchers: NYM – Matlack CIN – Gullett, Carroll (6), Hall (9), Borbón (9)
Attendance: 54,041

=== Game 3 ===
October 8: Shea Stadium, New York City, New York

Team	1	2	3	4	5	6	7	8	9	R	H	E
Cincinnati	0	0	2	0	0	0	0	0	0	2	8	1
New York	1	5	1	2	0	0	0	0	x	9	11	1
W: Jerry Koosman (1–0) L: Ross Grimsley (0–1) S: None
HR: CIN – Denis Menke (1) NYM – Rusty Staub (2), (3)
Pitchers: CIN – Grimsley, Hall (2), Tomlin (3), Nelson (4), Borbón (7) NYM – Koosman
Attendance: 53,967

=== Game 4 ===
October 9: Shea Stadium, New York City, New York

Team	1	2	3	4	5	6	7	8	9	10	11	12	R	H	E
Cincinnati	0	0	0	0	0	0	1	0	0	0	0	1	2	8	0
New York	0	0	1	0	0	0	0	0	0	0	0	0	1	3	1
W: Clay Carroll (1–0) L: Harry Parker (0–1) S: Pedro Borbón (1)
HR: CIN – Tony Pérez (1), Pete Rose (2) NYM – None
Pitchers: CIN – Norman, Gullett (6), Carroll (10), Borbón (12) NYM – Stone, McGraw (7), Parker (12)
Attendance: 50,786

=== Game 5 ===
October 10: Shea Stadium, New York City, New York

Team	1	2	3	4	5	6	7	8	9	R	H	E
Cincinnati	0	0	1	0	1	0	0	0	0	2	7	1
New York	2	0	0	0	4	1	0	0	x	7	13	1
W: Tom Seaver (1–1) L: Jack Billingham (0–1) S: Tug McGraw (1)
HR: CIN – None NYM – None
Pitchers: CIN – Billingham, Gullett (5), Carroll (5), Grimsley (7) NYM – Seaver, McGraw (9)
Attendance: 50,323

== Awards and honors ==
- Pete Rose – National League Most Valuable Player
- Pete Rose – National League Batting Champion

== Farm system ==
Level	Team	League	Manager
AAA	Indianapolis Indians	American Association	Vern Rapp
AA	Trois-Rivières Aigles	Eastern League	Jim Snyder
A	Tampa Tarpons	Florida State League	Russ Nixon
A-Short Season	Seattle Rainiers	Northwest League	Jim Hoff
Rookie	GCL Reds	Gulf Coast League	Ron Plaza
