= 1970 Cincinnati Reds season =

1970 Cincinnati Reds
- National League champion National League West Division champion
- League: National League
- Division: West
- Ballpark: Crosley Field (since 1934); Riverfront Stadium
- City: Cincinnati
- Record: 102–60 (.630)
- Divisional place: 1st
- Owners: Francis Dale
- General managers: Bob Howsam
- Managers: Sparky Anderson
- Television: WLWT (Ed Kennedy, Pee Wee Reese)
- Radio: WLW (Jim McIntyre, Joe Nuxhall)

The 1970 Cincinnati Reds season was the 101st season for the franchise in Major League Baseball. The Reds won the National League West title with a record of 102 wins and 60 losses, 14 1/2 games ahead of the Los Angeles Dodgers. The Reds defeated the Pittsburgh Pirates in three straight games in the NLCS to win their first National League pennant since 1961. The team then lost to the Baltimore Orioles in the World Series in five games.

The Reds were managed by first-year manager George "Sparky" Anderson and played their home games at Crosley Field during the first part of the year, before moving into the then-new Riverfront Stadium on June 30.

== Offseason ==
- October 24, 1969: Mel Queen was purchased from the Reds by the California Angels.
- October 29, 1969: Pedro Ramos was released by the Reds.
- November 14, 1969: Joaquín Andújar was signed as an amateur free agent by the Reds.
- November 25, 1969: Alex Johnson and Chico Ruiz were traded by the Reds to the California Angels for Pedro Borbón, Vern Geishert and Jim McGlothlin.
- January 14, 1970: Jack Fisher was traded by the Reds to the California Angels for Bill Harrelson and Dan Loomer (minors).
- January 17, 1970: Joel Youngblood was drafted by the Reds in the 2nd round of the 1970 Major League Baseball draft.
- February 4, 1970: Dennis Ribant was traded by the Reds to the Pittsburgh Pirates for Bo Belinsky.

== Regular season ==
Buoyed by a lineup that included third baseman Tony Pérez, NL MVP catcher Johnny Bench, right fielder Pete Rose, center fielder Bobby Tolan and first baseman Lee May, the Reds got off to a 70–30 start. The Reds, who had been near the bottom of the NL in pitching in 1969, were aided by a young staff that included 18-game winner Gary Nolan (22), rookies Wayne Simpson (21) and Don Gullett (19), 20-game winner Jim Merritt (26) and record-setting reliever Wayne Granger, who appeared in a then-record 90 games in 1969. Simpson, a hard-throwing former first-round draft pick, started the season 9–1 and earned an all-star berth. He was 14–3 before he suffered a season-ending arm injury with 30 games left.

=== Season standings ===
NL West
Team	W	L	Pct.	GB	Home	Road
Cincinnati Reds	102	60	.630	—	57‍–‍24	45‍–‍36
Los Angeles Dodgers	87	74	.540	14½	39‍–‍42	48‍–‍32
San Francisco Giants	86	76	.531	16	48‍–‍33	38‍–‍43
Houston Astros	79	83	.488	23	44‍–‍37	35‍–‍46
Atlanta Braves	76	86	.469	26	42‍–‍39	34‍–‍47
San Diego Padres	63	99	.389	39	31‍–‍50	32‍–‍49

=== Record vs. opponents ===
1970 National League record Sources:
Team	ATL	CHC	CIN	HOU	LAD	MON	NYM	PHI	PIT	SD	SF	STL
Atlanta	—	8–4	5–13	9–9	6–12	6–6	6–6	7–5	6–6	9–9	7–11	7–5
Chicago	4–8	—	7–5	7–5	6–6	13–5	7–11	9–9	8–10	9–3	7–5	7–11
Cincinnati	13–5	5–7	—	15–3	13–5	7–5	8–4	7–5	8–4	8–10	9–9	9–3
Houston	9–9	5–7	3–15	—	8–10	8–4	6–6	4–8	6–6	14–4	10–8	6–6
Los Angeles	12–6	6–6	5–13	10–8	—	8–4	7–5	6–5	6–6	11–7	9–9	7–5
Montreal	6–6	5–13	5–7	4–8	4–8	—	10–8	11–7	9–9	6–6	6–6	7–11
New York	6–6	11–7	4–8	6–6	5–7	8–10	—	13–5	6–12	6–6	6–6	12–6
Philadelphia	5-7	9–9	5–7	8–4	5–6	7–11	5–13	—	4–14	9–3	8–4	8–10
Pittsburgh	6–6	10–8	4–8	6–6	6–6	9–9	12–6	14–4	—	6–6	4–8	12–6
San Diego	9–9	3–9	10–8	4–14	7–11	6–6	6–6	3–9	6–6	—	5–13	4–8
San Francisco	11–7	5–7	9–9	8–10	9–9	6–6	6–6	4–8	8–4	13–5	—	7–5
St. Louis	5–7	11–7	3–9	6–6	5–7	11–7	6–12	10–8	6–12	8–4	5–7	—

=== Notable transactions ===
- April 13, 1970: Al Jackson was released by the Reds.
- May 27, 1970: Arturo DeFreites was signed as an amateur free agent by the Reds.
- June 4, 1970: 1970 Major League Baseball draft
  - Will McEnaney was drafted by the Reds in the 8th round.
  - Ray Knight was drafted by the Reds in the 10th round.
- June 15, 1970: Clyde Mashore was traded by the Reds to the Montreal Expos for Ty Cline.

=== Riverfront Stadium ===
Riverfront Stadium was opened in 1970, and it was the home of the Cincinnati Reds National League baseball team and the Cincinnati Bengals National Football League team. Located on the Ohio River in downtown Cincinnati, the stadium was best known as the home of "The Big Red Machine", as the Reds were often called in the 1970s. Construction began on February 1, 1968, and was completed at a cost of less than $50 million. On June 30, 1970, the Reds hosted the Atlanta Braves in their grand opening, with Hank Aaron hitting the first ever home run at Riverfront. Two weeks later on July 14, Riverfront hosted the 1970 Major League Baseball All-Star Game. This game is most remembered for the often-replayed collision at home plate between the home-grown Pete Rose and catcher Ray Fosse of the Cleveland Indians.

=== Roster ===
1970 Cincinnati Reds
Roster
Pitchers: 33 Mel Behney; 34 Bo Belinsky; 34 Pedro Borbón; 36 Clay Carroll; 40 Tony Cloninger; 37 Wayne Granger; 35 Don Gullett; 46 Jim Maloney; 31 Jim McGlothlin; 30 Jim Merritt; 38 Gary Nolan; 42 John Noriega; 45 Wayne Simpson; 39 Ray Washburn; 43 Milt Wilcox	Catchers: 5 Johnny Bench; 7 Pat Corrales; 9 Bill Plummer; Infielders: 12 Darrel Chaney; 13 Dave Concepción; 15 Frank Duffy; 19 Tommy Helms; 23 Lee May; 24 Tony Pérez; 17 Jay Ward; 6 Woody Woodward	Outfielders: 22 Ángel Bravo; 25 Bernie Carbo; 17 Ty Cline; 11 Hal McRae; 14 Pete Rose; 16 Jimmy Stewart; 28 Bobby Tolan	Manager: 10 Sparky Anderson; Coaches: 2 Alex Grammas; 18 Ted Kluszewski; 3 George Scherger; 4 Larry Shepard

== Player stats ==
= Indicates team leader

= Indicates league leader

=== Batting ===
==== Starters by position ====
Note: Pos = Position; G = Games played; AB = At bats; H = Hits; Avg. = Batting average; HR = Home runs; RBI = Runs batted in; SB = Stolen bases

Pos	Player	G	AB	H	Avg.	HR	RBI	SB
C	Johnny Bench	158	605	177	.293	45	148	5
1B	Lee May	153	605	153	.253	34	94	1
2B	Tommy Helms	150	575	136	.237	1	45	2
3B	Tony Pérez	158	587	186	.317	40	129	8
SS	Dave Concepción	101	265	69	.260	1	19	10
LF	Bernie Carbo	125	365	113	.310	21	63	10
CF	Bobby Tolan	152	589	186	.316	16	80	57
RF	Pete Rose	159	649	205*	.316	15	52	12

- Tied with Billy Williams (CHC)

==== Other batters ====
Note: G = Games played; AB = At bats; H = Hits; Avg. = Batting average; HR = Home runs; RBI = Runs batted in

Player	G	AB	H	Avg.	HR	RBI
Woody Woodward	100	264	59	.223	1	14
Hal McRae	70	165	41	.248	8	23
Pat Corrales	43	106	25	.236	1	10
Jimmy Stewart	101	105	28	.267	1	8
Darrel Chaney	57	95	22	.232	1	4
Angel Bravo	65	65	18	.277	0	3
Ty Cline	48	63	17	.270	0	8
Frank Duffy	6	11	2	.182	0	0
Bill Plummer	4	8	1	.125	0	0
Jay Ward	6	3	0	.000	0	0

=== Pitching ===
==== Starting pitchers ====
Note: G = Games pitched; IP = Innings pitched; W = Wins; L = Losses; ERA = Earned run average; SO = Strikeouts

Player	G	IP	W	L	ERA	SO
Gary Nolan	37	250.2	18	7	3.27	181
Jim Merritt	35	234.0	20	12	4.08	136
Jim McGlothlin	35	210.2	14	10	3.59	97
Wayne Simpson	26	176.0	14	3	3.02	119

==== Other pitchers ====
Note: G = Games pitched; IP = Innings pitched; W = Wins; L = Losses; ERA = Earned run average; SO = Strikeouts

Player	G	IP	W	L	ERA	SO
Tony Cloninger	30	148.0	9	7	3.83	56
Milt Wilcox	5	22.1	3	1	2.42	13
Jim Maloney	7	16.2	0	1	11.34	7
Mel Behney	5	10.0	0	2	4.50	2

==== Relief pitchers ====
Note: G = Games pitched; W = Wins; L = Losses; SV = Saves; ERA = Earned run average; SO = Strikeouts

Player	G	W	L	SV	ERA	SO
Wayne Granger	67	6	5	35	2.66	38
Clay Carroll	65	9	4	16	2.59	63
Don Gullett	44	5	2	6	2.43	76
Ray Washburn	35	4	4	0	6.92	37
Pedro Borbón	12	0	2	0	6.75	6
John Noriega	8	0	0	0	8.00	6
Bo Belinsky	3	0	0	0	4.50	6

== Postseason ==
=== 1970 National League Championship Series ===
==== Game One ====
October 3, Three Rivers Stadium

Team	1	2	3	4	5	6	7	8	9	10	R	H	E
Cincinnati	0	0	0	0	0	0	0	0	0	3	3	9	0
Pittsburgh	0	0	0	0	0	0	0	0	0	0	0	8	0
W: Gary Nolan (1–0) L: Dock Ellis (0–1) SV: Clay Carroll (1)
HRs: None

==== Game Two ====
October 4, Three Rivers Stadium

Team	1	2	3	4	5	6	7	8	9	R	H	E
Cincinnati	0	0	1	0	1	0	0	1	0	3	8	1
Pittsburgh	0	0	0	0	0	1	0	0	0	1	5	2
W: Jim Merritt (1–0) L: Luke Walker (0–1) SV: Don Gullett (1)
HRs: CIN – Bobby Tolan (1)

==== Game Three ====
October 5, Riverfront Stadium

Team	1	2	3	4	5	6	7	8	9	R	H	E
Pittsburgh	1	0	0	0	1	0	0	0	0	2	10	0
Cincinnati	2	0	0	0	0	0	0	1	X	3	5	0
W: Milt Wilcox (1–0) L: Bob Moose (0–1) SV: Don Gullett (2)
HRs: CIN – Tony Pérez (1), Johnny Bench (1)

=== 1970 World Series ===
After their win in the NLCS, additional injuries to Merritt and Granger caught up to the Reds against the Orioles. In three of their losses, the Reds had leads of 3–0, 4–0 and 3–0. The Reds' only win came in Game 4 on a Lee May 3-run home run in the eighth inning.

1970 World Series (4–1): Baltimore Orioles (A.L.) over Cincinnati Reds (N.L.)

Team	1	2	3	4	5	6	7	8	9	R	H	E
Baltimore Orioles	4	3	6	3	8	5	2	2	0	33	50	5
Cincinnati Reds	7	2	4	0	1	1	2	3	0	20	35	3
Total Attendance: 253,183 Average Attendance: 50,637
Winning Player's Share: – $18,216, Losing Player's Share– $13,688 *Includes Playoffs and World Series

== Awards and honors ==
- Johnny Bench, National League MVP Award (He was the youngest National League player in the 20th century to win the MVP Award.)

All-Star Game

- Johnny Bench, Catcher, Starter
- Tony Perez, Third Base, Starter
- Jim Merritt, Pitcher, Reserve
- Pete Rose, Outfield, Reserve

== Farm system ==
Level	Team	League	Manager
AAA	Indianapolis Indians	American Association	Vern Rapp
AA	Asheville Tourists	Southern League	Jim Snyder
A	Tampa Tarpons	Florida State League	Dick Kennedy
A-Short Season	Sioux Falls Packers	Northern League	Russ Nixon
Rookie	GCL Reds	Gulf Coast League	Ron Plaza
