= Bob Howsam =

American sports executive

- Born: February 28, 1918; Denver, Colorado, U.S.
- Died: February 19, 2008 (aged 89); Sun City, Arizona, U.S.
- Occupations: Major League Baseball executive American Football League co-founder and team owner

Robert Lee Howsam (February 28, 1918 – February 19, 2008) was an American professional sports executive and entrepreneur. In 1959, he played a key role in establishing two leagues—the American Football League, which succeeded and merged with the National Football League, and baseball's Continental League, which never played a game but forced expansion of Major League Baseball (MLB) from 16 to 20 teams in 1961–62.

Howsam then became a prominent MLB executive, primarily known as the general manager (GM) and club president of the Cincinnati Reds during the Big Red Machine dynasty from January 23, 1967, through February 15, 1978, when his team won four National League pennants and two World Series titles.

Immediately before his tenure in Cincinnati, he had served as GM of the St. Louis Cardinals from August 17, 1964, until January 22, 1967. Although he inherited a team that would win the 1964 World Series, he made material contributions to the Cardinals' 1967 world champions and 1968 pennant-winners.

Born in Denver and raised in La Jara, Colorado, where his father owned a bee-keeping business, Howsam attended the University of Colorado and served as a U.S. Navy pilot during World War II. He was the son-in-law of Edwin C. Johnson, a three-term United States Senator and two-term governor of Colorado. Johnson also was involved with professional baseball as founder and first president of the postwar Class A Western League, an upper-level minor league that played from 1947 to 1958.

== Efforts to bring Major League Baseball to Denver ==
Howsam made a name for himself as a baseball executive. He led the Denver Bears of the Western League and Triple-A American Association from 1947 to 1962. He built one of the most successful minor league franchises of the 1950s and was twice (1951 and 1956) named Minor League Executive of the Year by The Sporting News. Howsam, his brother Earl and his father Lee also built Bears Stadium, a minor league baseball park which, after renovation and expanded capacity, became famous as Mile High Stadium, the Denver Broncos' noisy, raucous and perpetually sold-out home from 1960 to 2001. While the Bears achieved success as the top farm team of the New York Yankees in the late 1950s, an earlier stint as a mid-level affiliate of the Pittsburgh Pirates (1952–54) served to introduce Howsam to Pirates' general manager Branch Rickey, the Baseball Hall of Fame executive, who had revolutionized baseball in his earlier career with the St. Louis Cardinals and Brooklyn Dodgers. Rickey would play an influential role later in Howsam's career.

In an attempt to bring Major League Baseball to Denver, Howsam was one of the founders of the Continental League, which in 1959 planned to become the "third Major League" following the epidemic of franchise shifts during the 1950s. MLB magnates, nervous about the possible rescinding of baseball's antitrust exemption by the U.S. Congress after the National League abandoned New York City in 1958, agreed to study (and perhaps support) the formation of the upstart league. Howsam was slated to become owner of the Denver franchise, one of the league's eight charter members. Howsam even went as far as expanding Bears Stadium to a capacity of over 34,000. Rickey, meanwhile, was elected president of the new circuit.

The new league never got off the drawing board; it was doomed once three of its key cities gained Major League franchises in 1961 and 1962: New York and Houston were awarded expansion National League franchises in 1962, while the Washington Senators of the American League moved to Minneapolis–Saint Paul as part of the Junior Circuit's 1961 expansion.

== Founder of AFL and Denver Broncos ==
Howsam had taken on a large amount of debt in hopes of bringing the majors to Denver. However, there was little prospect of retiring it in the foreseeable future, as he was now saddled with a stadium far too big for a Triple-A team. He concluded the only way to get additional revenue was to extend his stadium's season by bringing in a football team.

Howsam first sought an expansion NFL team for Denver. When that bid was turned down, he met with Lamar Hunt in the lobby of The Brown Palace Hotel and founded the Denver Broncos—one of the eight charter members of the American Football League. (Howsam and the seven other original owners called themselves the "Foolish Club" for daring to take on the established NFL.)

The Broncos played in the AFL from 1960 to 1969 and then joined the NFL with completion of the NFL/AFL merger in 1970. After a disastrous 4–9–1 season in 1960, the Howsams sold controlling interest in the Broncos and Bears to Gerald and Alan Phipps in May 1961. The team would only get as high as .500 only three times its first 17 years, including when it joined the NFL in 1970.

== In St. Louis: A World Series champ in first year ==
After selling the Broncos, Howsam returned to baseball. In the wake of the Continental League's demise, Rickey, then 80, rejoined the Cardinals in 1962 as a part-time but influential advisor to the team's owner, August A. Busch Jr. In mid-August 1964, with the Cardinals seemingly about to finish well behind the first-place Philadelphia Phillies, Busch fired general manager Bing Devine and replaced him with Howsam—reputedly at Rickey's urging. On August 17, the day of Howsam's hiring, St. Louis was in fifth place at 63–55 in the ten-team National League, nine games behind Philadelphia.

However, the team Howsam inherited ended up winning 30 of its last 44 games — including eight in a row from September 24–30 — and captured the NL pennant on the last day of the season, as the Phils collapsed. Then, behind Bob Gibson, they defeated the Yankees in the World Series. During the victory celebration after the clinching seventh game, Howsam was given credit for the St. Louis turnaround. This rankled several of the players, most of whom felt Devine's acquisition of Lou Brock in June provided the final piece of the puzzle. Furthermore, Howsam did not have an opportunity to make major changes to the team in his six weeks as general manager; his tenure began two months after the June 15 trade deadline then in effect and the Cardinals' 25-man roster remained virtually the same from August 17 through the World Series.

Howsam's two full years as Cardinals' general manager (1965–66) failed to deliver a pennant, with St. Louis winning 80 and 83 games, respectively. Howsam installed popular Red Schoendienst as manager and he rebuilt the Cardinals infield, trading away veterans and team leaders Ken Boyer, Bill White and Dick Groat in a bid for more pitching help. White later charged that, at the time of the trade, Howsam had falsely claimed that White was six years older than his stated age (31) to reporters, and White stated after his career ended that he had no respect for Howsam.

In 1966, Howsam acquired future Hall of Fame first baseman Orlando Cepeda from the San Francisco Giants on May 8 and right fielder Roger Maris from the Yankees on December 8 during the winter interleague trading period. As the long-term replacement for Boyer, Howsam and Schoendienst decided to stay in house and move Cardinal right fielder Mike Shannon to third base. With Howsam's contributions, the Cardinals were poised to win back-to-back pennants in 1967–68.

But in December 1966, a 13-member local ownership syndicate led by newspaper publisher Francis L. Dale purchased the Cincinnati Reds; one month later, on January 22, 1967, Howsam accepted the group's offer to become the club's new general manager.

== In Cincinnati: Engineering the 'Big Red Machine' ==
In Cincinnati, Howsam flourished. During his 11 full years (1967–77) as general manager, he was one of the key figures (along with his predecessor, Bill DeWitt, and his manager, Sparky Anderson) behind "The Big Red Machine", which captured six division titles from 1970 to 1979, four NLCS titles, and two World Series championships in 1975 and 1976.

Although many key parts of the Reds' dynasty — such as Pete Rose, Johnny Bench, Tony Pérez, Lee May and Tommy Helms — were already in place or in the organization in 1966, Howsam boldly promoted young pitchers such as Gary Nolan, Don Gullett and Wayne Simpson to the Major Leagues. In 1970, he replaced a popular incumbent manager, Dave Bristol, with a then-unproven but a future Hall-of-Fame skipper in Anderson, 35, whom Howsam had earlier hired as a manager in the Cardinals' and Reds' farm systems.

Along with player development director Sheldon "Chief" Bender, who came with Howsam from St. Louis, he ensured that the fruitful Cincinnati system continued to churn out young position players, such as Dave Concepción, Ken Griffey, Ray Knight and Bernie Carbo. He also acquired record-setting reliever Wayne Granger and two talented young outfielders, Bobby Tolan and Alex Johnson, from the Cardinals. It was the second time that Howsam had traded for Johnson (the first was in 1965 while Johnson was a member of the Philadelphia Phillies), and he would ultimately trade Johnson away for pitchers Pedro Borbon and Jim McGlothlin (who went on to win 14 games for the 1970 Reds).

Then, in two masterful 1971 trades, Howsam acquired second baseman Joe Morgan (in a deal that included May and Helms) from the Houston Astros and outfielder George Foster from the Giants (for utility infielder Frank Duffy). In Cincinnati, Morgan won consecutive NL Most Valuable Player awards in 1975–76 and earned credentials for membership in the Hall of Fame. Foster won the 1977 NL MVP award when he belted 52 home runs for the Reds — the only player to crack the half-century HR mark in the 1970s or 1980s.

The 1976 Cincinnati Reds won 102 regular season games, then swept both the Phillies in the 1976 National League Championship Series and the Yankees in the 1976 World Series. It is considered one of the strongest teams in baseball history. The Sporting News named Howsam Major League Executive of the Year for 1973; ironically, that season the powerhouse Reds dropped the NLCS to the underdog New York Mets.

Howsam reportedly had considerably more authority than most general managers of the time. The team's owners during his tenure (first Dale, then Louis Nippert) largely left the team's day-to-day operations in his hands, and he added the title of team president in 1973. He even represented the Reds at owners' meetings. Under his watch, the Reds were known for their strict policies on player appearance. Players were not allowed to have facial hair (a policy that continued long after Howsam left the team) and were required to wear their uniform pants and socks in a specific fashion. Howsam was especially known for his conservatism regarding labor relations; under him, the Reds were among the hardliners during the 1972 strike.

== After the dynasty ==
The advent of free agency came upon baseball right after the Reds' 1976 title. Facing the looming question of whom to play first base—34-year-old incumbent, team leader, and future Hall of Famer Tony Pérez or 25-year-old Dan Driessen—Howsam chose Driessen; Pérez and left-hander Will McEnaney were sent to the Montreal Expos in exchange for veteran pitcher Woodie Fryman and reliever Dale Murray. Many players, along with Anderson and Howsam himself, believed that the loss of Pérez in the clubhouse played a key factor in the decline of the team in the following years. Don Gullett left the Reds after the 1976 season and signed with the Yankees.

The 1977 Reds finished second in the NL West to the Los Angeles Dodgers (a team that had finished in second in the division six times in the previous seven years), despite Howsam engineering a big mid-season trade for future Hall of Fame pitcher Tom Seaver. Approaching his 60th birthday in February 1978, Howsam turned over his general manager responsibilities to a longtime assistant, Dick Wagner, who was described in print as Howsam's "hatchet man".

The Reds finished second to the Dodgers again in 1978 and Rose left via free agency in the winter of 1978. Wagner fired Sparky Anderson after the 1978 season after Anderson refused to fire key members of his coaching staff. Joe Morgan left in 1979. Howsam returned to the club presidency in 1983, replacing a fired Wagner. By then, the Reds were in last place in the NL West. Howsam traded for an aging Pete Rose in 1984 and installed him as a player-manager. Rose would become the all-time hits leader the next year, collecting hit #4,192 on September 11, 1985, eclipsing a record set by Ty Cobb. Howsam was elected to the Cincinnati Reds Hall of Fame in 2004.

In retirement, Howsam served on the Colorado Baseball Commission, which succeeded in bringing the Colorado Rockies to Denver as a National League expansion team in 1993 — thus fulfilling his dream of bringing MLB to his hometown three decades after the death of the Continental League. He had been elected to his home state's Sports Hall of Fame in 1971. He died from complications of heart disease on February 19, 2008, nine days short of his 90th birthday, at his Sun City, Arizona, home.

Preceded by Bing Devine	St. Louis Cardinals General Manager; 1964–1966	Succeeded by Stan Musial
Preceded by Bill DeWitt	Cincinnati Reds General Manager; 1967–1977	Succeeded by Dick Wagner
