= 1973 National League Championship Series =

5th edition of Major League Baseball's National League Championship Series

Team (Wins)	Managers	Season
New York Mets (3)	Yogi Berra	82–79, .509, GA: 1 1/2
Cincinnati Reds (2)	Sparky Anderson	99–63, .611, GA: 3 1/2
- Dates: October 6–10
- Umpires: Ed Sudol (crew chief); Ed Vargo; Chris Pelekoudas; Bob Engel; Bruce Froemming; Jerry Dale

Broadcast
- Television: NBC; WOR-TV (NYM); WLWT (CIN)
- TV announcers: NBC: Curt Gowdy and Tony Kubek (in Cincinnati); Jim Simpson and Maury Wills (in New York); WOR-TV: Lindsey Nelson, Ralph Kiner, and Bob Murphy; WLWT: Charlie Jones and Wes Parker
- Radio: WHN (NYM); WLW (CIN)
- Radio announcers: WHN: Lindsey Nelson, Ralph Kiner and Bob Murphy; WLW: Al Michaels and Joe Nuxhall

The 1973 National League Championship Series was a semifinal series in Major League Baseball’s 1973 postseason played between the New York Mets and the Cincinnati Reds from October 6 to 10. New York won the series three games to two and advanced to the World Series, where they lost to the Oakland Athletics in what was the second of three straight world championships for Oakland. The Mets set a record for lowest win percentage by a pennant winner, finishing the regular season with an 82–79 record. However, most of the season was plagued by the injury jinx to their key players. In September they finally got healthy and just in time for the playoffs. The Mets' victory has gone down as one of the greatest upsets in MLB history, as they dominated the heavily favored Big Red Machine.

The 1973 NLCS was marred by a fight that broke out in the fifth inning of the third game, beginning with a tussle between Cincinnati's Pete Rose and New York's Bud Harrelson at second base. Players from both sides joined in a general melee that lasted for several minutes and set off rowdy fan behavior at Shea Stadium in New York. Photographs of the fight, autographed by Rose and Harrelson, are now available at a number of Internet sites.

This was the fifth National League Championship Series in all and the only NLCS between 1970 and 1980 not to feature either the Philadelphia Phillies or the Pittsburgh Pirates. In fact, from 1969 to 1980 the NL East champion was either the Mets, Pirates or the Phillies.

== Summary ==
=== New York Mets vs. Cincinnati Reds ===
New York won the series, 3–2.

Game	Date	Score	Location	Time	Attendance
1	October 6	New York Mets – 1, Cincinnati Reds – 2	Riverfront Stadium	2:00	53,431
2	October 7	New York Mets – 5, Cincinnati Reds – 0	Riverfront Stadium	2:19	54,041
3	October 8	Cincinnati Reds – 2, New York Mets – 9	Shea Stadium	2:48	53,967
4	October 9	Cincinnati Reds – 2, New York Mets – 1 (12)	Shea Stadium	3:07	50,786
5	October 10	Cincinnati Reds – 2, New York Mets – 7	Shea Stadium	2:40	50,323

== Game summaries ==
=== Game 1 ===
October 6, 1973 4:00 pm (ET) at Riverfront Stadium in Cincinnati, Ohio
Team	1	2	3	4	5	6	7	8	9	R	H	E
New York	0	1	0	0	0	0	0	0	0	1	3	0
Cincinnati	0	0	0	0	0	0	0	1	1	2	6	0
WP: Pedro Borbón (1–0) LP: Tom Seaver (0–1); Home runs: NYM: None; CIN: Pete Rose (1), Johnny Bench (1)

The starting pitchers, New York's Tom Seaver and Cincinnati's Jack Billingham, produced a classic pitchers' duel in Game 1. The Mets threatened in the first, loading the bases with one out, but Cleon Jones grounded into a double play to end the inning. The Mets scored their lone run in the second when Seaver doubled home Bud Harrelson. Seaver was also in control of a normally potent Cincinnati offense, holding the Reds scoreless through seven innings. In the eighth, however, Pete Rose homered off Seaver with one out, and Seaver yielded another solo homer in the ninth to Johnny Bench. The Reds walked off with a 1–0 advantage in the series.

Seaver's 13 strikeout performance still stands as a franchise record for a postseason game; it would be later matched by Jacob DeGrom in Game 1 of the 2015 National League Division Series.

=== Game 2 ===
October 7, 1973 4:00 pm (ET) at Riverfront Stadium in Cincinnati, Ohio
Team	1	2	3	4	5	6	7	8	9	R	H	E
New York	0	0	0	1	0	0	0	0	4	5	7	0
Cincinnati	0	0	0	0	0	0	0	0	0	0	2	0
WP: Jon Matlack (1–0) LP: Don Gullett (0–1); Home runs: NYM: Rusty Staub (1); CIN: None

New York leveled the series behind the superb pitching of starter Jon Matlack. Just as in Game 1, pitching dominated Game 2, as lefties Matlack of Mets and Don Gullett of the Reds were near the top of their respective games. A Rusty Staub home run in the fourth inning was the only run through eight innings. After Gullett exited for a pinch hitter in the sixth inning, Clay Carroll shut down the Mets for three innings, but New York put the game away with four runs in the ninth against Reds' relievers Tom Hall and Pedro Borbón. Matlack completed his two-hitter (reserve outfielder Andy Kosco collected both hits, in the second and seventh innings) by retiring the Reds 1–2–3 in the ninth. In a postgame interview, the light-hitting Harrelson said, "He (Matlack) made the Big Red Machine look like me hitting today."

=== Game 3 ===
October 8, 1973 2:00 pm (ET) at Shea Stadium in Queens, New York
Team	1	2	3	4	5	6	7	8	9	R	H	E
Cincinnati	0	0	2	0	0	0	0	0	0	2	8	1
New York	1	5	1	2	0	0	0	0	X	9	11	1
WP: Jerry Koosman (1–0) LP: Ross Grimsley (0–1); Home runs: CIN: Denis Menke (1); NYM: Rusty Staub 2 (3)

During pregame warm-ups, Harrelson was confronted by Reds second baseman Joe Morgan, who told Harrelson that 1973 batting champion and eventual NL MVP, Pete Rose, didn't appreciate Harrelson's Game 2 post-game disparaging comments, saying Harrelson was finding more fault with the Reds rather than giving Matlack credit.

The Mets scored early and often in Game 3, racing out to a 6–0 lead after just two innings. Rusty Staub hit his second homer of the series in the first inning, and the Mets erupted for five more runs in the second, highlighted by yet another homer from Staub, a three-run shot. The Reds scored their runs in the third on a Denis Menke homer and an RBI single by Joe Morgan off Mets starting pitcher Jerry Koosman.

In the top of the fifth with Pete Rose on first, Morgan hit a double play ball to Mets first baseman John Milner, Rose slid hard into Bud Harrelson as he tried unsuccessfully to break up the double play. Harrelson said something to Rose and they began to fight at second as both teams poured onto the field. Order was eventually restored and neither Rose nor Harrelson were ejected. But when Rose returned to his left field position in the bottom of the fifth, fans at Shea Stadium began showering him with debris. Reds manager Sparky Anderson then pulled his team off the field. After a whiskey bottle almost hit Rose, National League president Chub Feeney threatened to force the Mets to declare a forfeit, unless they could calm the fans. Yogi Berra, as well as Willie Mays, Seaver, Staub and Cleon Jones walked out to left field and persuaded fans to stop throwing debris. "Look at the scoreboard!" Mays told them. "We're ahead! Let 'em play the game." The game was completed without any more incidents from either team and the Mets won to take a 2 games to 1 lead.

=== Game 4 ===
October 9, 1973 2:00 pm (ET) at Shea Stadium in Queens, New York
Team	1	2	3	4	5	6	7	8	9	10	11	12	R	H	E
Cincinnati	0	0	0	0	0	0	1	0	0	0	0	1	2	8	0
New York	0	0	1	0	0	0	0	0	0	0	0	0	1	3	1
WP: Clay Carroll (1–0) LP: Harry Parker (0–1) Sv: Pedro Borbón (1); Home runs: CIN: Tony Pérez (1), Pete Rose (2); NYM: None

The Reds evened the series behind outstanding pitching and a clutch home run from Pete Rose. The Mets opened the scoring in the third off Reds starter Fred Norman, when Félix Millán singled home Don Hahn. Norman with the help of seven shutout innings from the Reds bullpen, held the Mets to two singles for the rest of the game. The Reds tied the game in the seventh inning on a Tony Pérez home run. The Reds had scoring threats in the 10th and 11th innings, but couldn't score because of two outstanding catches by Rusty Staub. The latter unfortunately resulted in a severe injury to Staub's right shoulder when he crashed into the right field fence. Then In the 12th, much to the displeasure of the Shea Stadium crowd, Rose hit a tie-breaking homer off Met reliever Harry Parker to give the Reds a 2–1 lead. Pedro Borbón came on to retire the Mets in the bottom of the 12th to even the series at 2–2.

=== Game 5 ===
October 10, 1973 2:00 pm (ET) at Shea Stadium in Queens, New York
Team	1	2	3	4	5	6	7	8	9	R	H	E
Cincinnati	0	0	1	0	1	0	0	0	0	2	7	1
New York	2	0	0	0	4	1	0	0	X	7	13	1
WP: Tom Seaver (1–1) LP: Jack Billingham (0–1) Sv: Tug McGraw (1)

A Game 5 victory gave the Mets their second National League pennant in five years, as Tom Seaver pitched New York to victory. The Reds loaded the bases in the top of the first but couldn't score, the Mets took the lead on a two-run single by Ed Kranepool (playing in place of the injured Rusty Staub) in the bottom of the inning. Cincinnati tied the game with single runs in the third and fifth on a sacrifice fly by Dan Driessen and an RBI single by Tony Pérez. The Mets went ahead for good with four runs on four hits in the fifth, capped by a run-scoring single from Bud Harrelson. Seaver scored New York's final run in the sixth when he doubled and came home on a Cleon Jones single. Seaver kept the Reds off the board after the fifth, although closer Tug McGraw came on to get the final two outs for the save after the Reds had loaded the bases in the ninth.

The Mets got just six more hits than the Reds in the series (37–31), but outscored them 23–8. The Mets hit just .220 but the great NY Mets staff held the hard-hitting Reds to a meager .186 team batting average.

NBC interrupted its coverage of the game to report the resignation of Vice President Spiro Agnew after pleading nolo contendere to corruption charges.

== Composite line score ==
1973 NLCS (3–2): New York Mets over Cincinnati Reds

Team	1	2	3	4	5	6	7	8	9	10	11	12	R	H	E
New York Mets	3	6	2	3	4	1	0	0	4	0	0	0	23	37	3
Cincinnati Reds	0	0	3	0	1	0	1	1	1	0	0	1	8	31	2
Total attendance: 262,548 Average attendance: 52,510

== Aftermath ==
A near riot would break out after the Mets clinched the pennant, possibly as result of the Pete Rose and Bud Harrelson brawl two days before, or unrest in the country due to the ongoing Watergate scandal. The 340 policemen and private officers on duty were completely outmanned as thousands of fans rushed the field. As WFAN’s Bob Heussler, a college student at the game that day, recalled years later, “It was like a carpet bombing except it was done by the fans." The Reds dignitaries and families were harassed to the point that they were taken off the field through the Cincinnati dugout for their own protection. Pete Rose would say after the game, "New York doesn't deserve a pennant. They let the fans out of the zoo for the game & take them back when it's over."

In the Mets' locker room after the game, Tom Seaver poured bubbly on the New York City Mayor John Lindsay saying "Once again" referring to what he had done in 1969; the mayor exclaimed back saying, "Once again!!!". As the players doused each other in champagne, Tug McGraw was heard yelling repeatedly "Ya Gotta Believe, Ya Gotta Believe!!!". This phrase was used by McGraw throughout the year, especially when the team was struggling, and would be adopted by the Mets as a team rally crying in the years afterwards.

This was the last year both League Championship Series went to a winner-take-all game in the five-game format era (1969–1984). The day after the Mets pennant win, the A's defeated the Baltimore Orioles to advance to their second consecutive World Series, where they also defeated the Mets in seven games.

Despite this loss and two World Series losses in the decade, the Reds finally broke through with back-to-back World Series in 1975 and 1976 before front office management disbanded the team, giving the Big Red Machine the elusive championship they had not won earlier in the decade.

In one of the most controversial trades in New York sports history, the Mets traded Tom Seaver to the Cincinnati Reds in 1977 after a contract dispute between Mets management and Seaver.
