= 1972 National League Championship Series =

4th edition of Major League Baseball's National League Championship Series

Team (Wins)	Managers	Season
Cincinnati Reds (3)	Sparky Anderson	95–59, .617, GA: 10 1/2
Pittsburgh Pirates (2)	Bill Virdon	96–59, .619, GA: 11
- Dates: October 7–11
- Umpires: Augie Donatelli (crew chief); Ken Burkhart; Doug Harvey; Billy Williams; John Kibler; Harry Wendelstedt

Broadcast
- Television: NBC; WLWT (CIN); KDKA-TV (PIT)
- TV announcers: NBC: Jim Simpson and Sandy Koufax (Game 1); Curt Gowdy and Tony Kubek (in Cincinnati); NBC did not televise Game 2 due to conflicts with its NFL coverage. WLWT: Tom Hedrick, Jack Moran, and Waite Hoyt; KDKA-TV: Bob Prince and Nellie King
- Radio: WLW (CIN); KDKA (PIT)
- Radio announcers: WLW: Al Michaels and Joe Nuxhall; KDKA: Bob Prince and Nellie King

The 1972 National League Championship Series was the semifinal round in Major League Baseball’s 1972 postseason played between the Cincinnati Reds and the Pittsburgh Pirates from October 7 to 11. It was the fourth NLCS. Cincinnati won the series three games to two to advance to the World Series against the Oakland Athletics. The Reds became the first team in major league history to advance to the World Series without the best record in their respective league, made possible by the Junior and Senior Circuits each splitting into two divisions in 1969. In the previous three post seasons, the team with the best record in each league advanced to the World Series.

The 1972 NLCS ended with a dramatic ninth inning rally in the fifth and deciding game. The series was also notable as the last on-field appearance by Pittsburgh's future Hall of Famer Roberto Clemente, who would die in a plane crash on December 31.

== Summary ==
=== Cincinnati Reds vs. Pittsburgh Pirates ===
Cincinnati won the series, 3–2.

Game	Date	Score	Location	Time	Attendance
1	October 7	Cincinnati Reds – 1, Pittsburgh Pirates – 5	Three Rivers Stadium	1:57	50,476
2	October 8	Cincinnati Reds – 5, Pittsburgh Pirates – 3	Three Rivers Stadium	2:43	50,584
3	October 9	Pittsburgh Pirates – 3, Cincinnati Reds – 2	Riverfront Stadium	2:23	52,420
4	October 10	Pittsburgh Pirates – 1, Cincinnati Reds – 7	Riverfront Stadium	1:58	39,447
5	October 11	Pittsburgh Pirates – 3, Cincinnati Reds – 4	Riverfront Stadium	2:19	41,887

== Game summaries ==
=== Game 1 ===
October 7, 1972 1:00 pm (ET) at Three Rivers Stadium in Pittsburgh, Pennsylvania
Team	1	2	3	4	5	6	7	8	9	R	H	E
Cincinnati	1	0	0	0	0	0	0	0	0	1	8	0
Pittsburgh	3	0	0	0	2	0	0	0	X	5	6	0
WP: Steve Blass (1–0) LP: Don Gullett (0–1) Sv: Ramón Hernández (1); Home runs: CIN: Joe Morgan (1); PIT: Al Oliver (1)

The Reds got a first-inning homer from second baseman Joe Morgan to take a short-lived 1–0 lead. But Pittsburgh bounced back with three in the bottom of the inning, highlighted by an RBI triple from Al Oliver and an RBI double from Willie Stargell. Pittsburgh never looked back, getting a two-run homer from Oliver in the fifth and coasting to the win behind the strong pitching of Steve Blass. The frustrated Reds ultimately stranded 11 baserunners, and their manager Sparky Anderson was ejected in the fourth inning. The time of game was a brisk 1 hour and 57 minutes.

=== Game 2 ===
October 8, 1972 1:00 pm (ET) at Three Rivers Stadium in Pittsburgh, Pennsylvania
Team	1	2	3	4	5	6	7	8	9	R	H	E
Cincinnati	4	0	0	0	0	0	0	1	0	5	8	1
Pittsburgh	0	0	0	1	1	1	0	0	0	3	7	1
WP: Tom Hall (1–0) LP: Bob Moose (0–1); Home runs: CIN: Joe Morgan (2); PIT: None

Cincinnati bounced back to even the series in Game 2. Pittsburgh starter Bob Moose allowed five consecutive hits to start the game. Bobby Tolan and Tony Pérez both hit two-run doubles to give the Reds a 4–0 lead and chase Moose. The Pittsburgh bullpen stopped the Reds offense, though, and the Pirates came back to make it a 4–3 game with single runs in the fourth, fifth and sixth, as Milt May, Roberto Clemente and Dave Cash picked up RBIs. Joe Morgan homered in the eighth to give the Reds a crucial insurance run, and Cincinnati reliever Tom Hall finished a long and strong relief stint to get the victory.

=== Game 3 ===
October 9, 1972 3:00 pm (ET) at Riverfront Stadium in Cincinnati, Ohio
Team	1	2	3	4	5	6	7	8	9	R	H	E
Pittsburgh	0	0	0	0	1	0	1	1	0	3	7	0
Cincinnati	0	0	2	0	0	0	0	0	0	2	8	1
WP: Bruce Kison (1–0) LP: Clay Carroll (0–1) Sv: Dave Giusti (1); Home runs: PIT: Manny Sanguillén (1); CIN: None

The series moved to Cincinnati and produced a tense, low-scoring contest. Cincinnati's Darrell Chaney and Bobby Tolan hit RBI singles in the bottom of the third to give the Reds a 2–0 lead. In the fifth, Pittsburgh catcher Manny Sanguillén homered to cut the lead in half, and Rennie Stennett tied the game at 2 in the seventh with an RBI single. The Pirates scored the go-ahead run in the eighth on a groundout by Sanguillen. Pirates closer Dave Giusti, came on in the eighth to shut the door on the Reds and earn the save.

=== Game 4 ===
October 10, 1972 3:00 pm (ET) at Riverfront Stadium in Cincinnati, Ohio
Team	1	2	3	4	5	6	7	8	9	R	H	E
Pittsburgh	0	0	0	0	0	0	1	0	0	1	2	3
Cincinnati	1	0	0	2	0	2	2	0	X	7	11	1
WP: Ross Grimsley (1–0) LP: Dock Ellis (0–1); Home runs: PIT: Roberto Clemente (1); CIN: None

The Reds evened the series in Game 4 behind a sparkling two-hitter from left-handed hurler Ross Grimsley. The Reds scored three runs off Pirates starter Dock Ellis, aided by Pittsburgh errors in the first and fourth. Grimsley singled in another run in the sixth and the Reds eventually added three more. The run support was more than enough for Grimsley as he held the typically potent Pirates' offense in check. He yielded just two hits, both by Roberto Clemente. Pittsburgh got its lone run on a seventh-inning homer by Clemente.

=== Game 5 ===
October 11, 1972 4:28 pm (ET) at Riverfront Stadium in Cincinnati, Ohio
Team	1	2	3	4	5	6	7	8	9	R	H	E
Pittsburgh	0	2	0	1	0	0	0	0	0	3	8	0
Cincinnati	0	0	1	0	1	0	0	0	2	4	7	1
WP: Clay Carroll (1–1) LP: Dave Giusti (0–1); Home runs: PIT: None; CIN: César Gerónimo (1), Johnny Bench (1)

Game 5 proved to be one of the more memorable postseason contests in baseball history. After rain delayed the start of the game for 90 minutes, Pittsburgh took an early 2–0 lead with second-inning RBIs from Richie Hebner and Dave Cash. The Reds got one back in the third on an RBI double by Pete Rose. But Pittsburgh inched further ahead with another run-scoring hit from Cash in the fourth. César Gerónimo cut the Pirates' lead to 3–2 with a homer in the fifth. The Pirates held onto their 1-run margin until a dramatic bottom of the ninth.

With the defending World Series champion Pirates three outs away from returning to defend their title, Reds catcher Johnny Bench hit a 1–2 backdoor changeup off Pittsburgh closer Dave Giusti over the right field wall for a home run to tie the game. Tony Pérez singled and was replaced by pinch-runner George Foster. Denis Menke followed with another single as Foster moved to second base. With the count 2–0 on Geronimo, Giusti was replaced with Game 2 starter Bob Moose. Geronimo's fly ball out advanced Foster to third base, but Moose induced shortstop Darrell Chaney to pop out as Foster stayed at third. Just when it looked like Moose might wiggle out of a tough two-on, no out situation, he uncorked a wild pitch to pinch-hitter Hal McRae scoring Foster with the winning run, as the hometown fans and the Reds players celebrated a return to the World Series to face the Oakland A's. It was only the second time a postseason series ended on a wild pitch, the other being the 1927 World Series in which the Pirates lost to the Yankees in a four-game sweep.

== Composite line score ==
1972 NLCS (3–2): Cincinnati Reds over Pittsburgh Pirates

Team	1	2	3	4	5	6	7	8	9	R	H	E
Cincinnati Reds	6	0	3	2	1	2	2	1	2	19	42	4
Pittsburgh Pirates	3	2	0	2	4	1	2	1	0	15	30	4
Total attendance: 234,814 Average attendance: 46,963

== Aftermath ==
Exhilarated by Cincinnati’s hard-fought playoff win, Reds center fielder Bobby Tolan declared, “As far as I’m concerned, the World Series is over. The two best teams just played.” Tolan's words would prove to be premature, as the Reds were defeated by the Oakland A’s in seven games in the World Series.

The Cincinnati Enquirer later called Game 5 the second best game in franchise history, behind only Game 7 of the 1975 World Series.

On December 31, 1972, 81 days after Pittsburgh was defeated by Cincinnati in Game 5, a DC-7 cargo plane carrying supplies to earthquake survivors in Nicaragua crashed after taking off from San Juan, Puerto Rico. None of the five passengers survived. Roberto Clemente, who organized a committee to collect the relief materials, was one of the crash victims. The Pittsburgh Pirates' 1973 opening day on April 6, 1973, was deeply emotional, featuring the retirement of Roberto Clemente's #21 jersey at Three Rivers Stadium before a record crowd. The death of Clemente would understandably take a toll on the team the next season, as 1973 was the only year the Pirates had a losing record in the 1970s.
