= Ed Sprague =

Ed Sprague may refer to:

- Ed Sprague Sr. (1945–2020), pitcher in Major League Baseball 1968–1976
- Ed Sprague Jr. (born 1967), third baseman in Major League Baseball 1991–2001
