= John Noriega =

American baseball player (1943–2001)

- Pitcher
- Born: December 20, 1943; Ogden, Utah, U.S.
- Died: September 29, 2001 (aged 57); Bountiful, Utah, U.S.
- Batted: Right Threw: Right

MLB debut
- May 1, 1969, for the Cincinnati Reds

Last MLB appearance
- August 9, 1970, for the Cincinnati Reds

MLB statistics
- Win–loss record: 0–0
- Earned run average: 7.36
- Innings pitched: 25 2/3
- Strikeouts: 10
- Stats at Baseball Reference

Teams
- Cincinnati Reds (1969–1970)

John Alan Noriega (December 20, 1943 – September 29, 2001) was an American professional baseball player, a right-handed pitcher who played in 13 Major League Baseball games for the 1969–1970 Cincinnati Reds. Born in Ogden, Utah, he stood 6 feet 4 inches (1.93 m) tall and weighed 185 pounds (84 kg).

Noriega was born in Ogden, Utah to John (Jack) Noriega and Marion (Evertson) Noriega. He graduated from Davis High School in Kaysville, Utah, where he was an all-state pitcher and in basketball was a member of the 1961 state title-winning team.

He received scholarship offers from Brigham Young University and the University of Utah, which is where he went. He married Barbara Tidwell on October 1, 1965.

Selected by the Reds out of the University of Utah in the fourth round of the 1966 Major League Baseball draft (62nd overall), Noriega's Major League career (all as a relief pitcher) came in two bursts: five games in May 1969 and four games each in July and August 1970. During the latter season, the first year of the Cincinnati's "Big Red Machine" dynasty, Noriega was primarily used in middle relief during the midsummer. In one notable appearance, on August 6 against the San Francisco Giants, he threw 6 2/3 innings of long relief, allowing only two runs. His MLB season and career ended three days later, and he was not on the Reds' 1970 postseason squad. All told, he allowed 37 hits and 13 bases on balls with 10 strikeouts in 25 2/3 MLB innings.

Noriega's career in minor league baseball lasted for six seasons (1966–1971) and 229 games played.

After baseball, he worked for 25 years as a recreation therapist for Davis County Mental Health. In 1998 he founded the nonprofit organization HITE (High Impact Teaching Empowerment).

John Noriega died of a stroke at age 57 on September 29, 2001, in Layton, Utah. He was survived by his wife of 36 years, Barbara; sons John and David; daughter Kari; son-in-law Brandon Hatch; daughters-in-law Heidi and Sharlena; and six grandchildren (and one was on the way). He is buried in Kaysville.
