= Jim McGlothlin =

American baseball player (1943–1975)

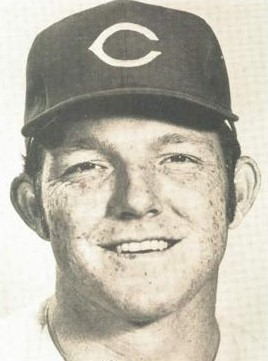
- Pitcher
- Born: October 6, 1943; Los Angeles, California, U.S.
- Died: December 23, 1975 (aged 32); Union, Kentucky, U.S.
- Batted: Right Threw: Right

MLB debut
- September 20, 1965, for the California Angels

Last MLB appearance
- September 28, 1973, for the Chicago White Sox

MLB statistics
- Win–loss record: 67–77
- Earned run average: 3.61
- Strikeouts: 709
- Stats at Baseball Reference

Teams
- California Angels (1965–1969); Cincinnati Reds (1970–1973); Chicago White Sox (1973)

Career highlights and awards
- All-Star (1967)

James Milton McGlothlin (October 6, 1943 – December 23, 1975), nicknamed "Red", was an American Major League Baseball (MLB) pitcher. During a nine-year MLB career, he pitched for the California Angels (1965–1969), Cincinnati Reds (1970–73) and Chicago White Sox (1973).

He died of a rare type of leukemia, at age 32.

== Early life ==
McGlothlin was born on October 6, 1943, in Los Angeles. When he was in his early teens, McGlothlin's father died, and he worked nightly at a gas station to help support his mother. He graduated from Reseda High School in 1961, where he was a standout pitcher on the baseball team, winning All-Valley honors. He met his future wife Janice at Reseda High. He was signed as an amateur free agent the following year by the Los Angeles Angels.

== Baseball career ==
McGlothlin threw and batted right-handed and was listed as 6 feet 1 inch (1.85 m) tall and 185 pounds (84 kg).

=== Minor league ===
McGlothlin played in the Angels' minor league system for all or parts of the 1962-66 seasons. In 1965, playing for the Seattle Angels of the Triple-A Pacific Coast League (PCL), he had a 14–8 record, with a 2.55 earned run average (ERA), and 180 strikeouts in 205 innings. He was second in the PCL in strikeouts and fifth in wins. He was one win behind future major league pitcher and NBA Hall of Fame player Dave DeBusschere, and was one place ahead of him in strikeout ranking.

=== California Angels ===
McGlothlin made his major league debut at age 21 on September 20, 1965, allowing four earned runs in five innings pitched in a 4–2 home loss against the Baltimore Orioles. He split the 1966 season between Seattle and Los Angeles, starting 11 games, with a 3–0 record in the American League (AL) that year.

He joined the Angels full time in 1967. He was named to the American League All-Star Team in 1967, a season in which he tied for the AL lead in shutouts (with six), had a career-high nine complete games and posted a 12–8 record and a 2.96 earned run average. He pitched two innings in the All Star Game, giving up only one hit, allowing no runs, and striking out two. After having already started in 29 games that season, McGlothlin pitched in relief in the second games of both doubleheaders versus the Detroit Tigers on the final weekend of that season, and was the winning pitcher in the final game, which eliminated the Tigers from the American League pennant race.

The Angels had been one of five contenders in the 1967 race until a disastrous, mid-August stretch saw them lose 12 out of 15 games and drop from 11/2 games behind to 81/2 lengths out of the league lead. They finished 1967 at 84–77, but then slumped to losing marks in both 1968 (67–95) and 1969 (71–91). McGlothlin's record suffered with his team's, as he dropped 31 of 49 decisions and posted above-3.00 earned run averages. On November 25, 1969, he was included in one of the off-season's high profile interleague trades when the Angels sent him and fellow pitchers Pedro Borbón and Vern Geishert to the Cincinnati Reds for hard-hitting outfielder Alex Johnson and utility infielder Chico Ruiz.

=== Cincinnati Reds ===
In his first season in the National League, McGlothlin proceeded to win a career-high 14 games for the pennant-winning 1970 "Big Red Machine", leading the staff with three shutouts and finishing third on the Reds in innings pitched (2101/3). McGlothlin did not pitch in the 1970 National League Championship Series against the Pittsburgh Pirates, and started Game 2 of the 1970 World Series against the Baltimore Orioles. In Game 2, he did not earn a decision after working 4 1/3 innings. The Reds dropped that game, 6–5, en route to a five-game Series loss.

In 1971, he lowered his earned run average from 3.59 to 3.22 and remained on the team's top ten players in wins above replacement, but he dropped 12 of 20 decisions as Cincinnati won 23 fewer games than in 1970 and fell back in the standings. In strike-shortened 1972, McGlothlin's final full season with the Reds, he started 21 regular-season games and posted a winning record (9–8) for a pennant-winning club. But his effectiveness diminished: his ERA rose to 3.91 and, for the first time as an MLB starting pitcher, he allowed more hits (165) than innings pitched (145).

He also started a game in the 1972 World Series. In Game 5, he allowed four earned runs in three full innings against the Oakland Athletics and Catfish Hunter. The Reds would win the game in the ninth, 5–4. McGlothlin received a no decision.

Used sparingly in 1973, he made nine starts among his 24 appearances and split six decisions, but his ERA ballooned to 6.68 in 631/3 innings pitched.

=== Late career ===
McGlothlin was traded back to the American League, to the Chicago White Sox, on August 29, 1973. He last pitched for the White Sox at age 29 on September 28, 1973. His final game was the only game he started in a Chicago uniform, and he absorbed a 4–1 defeat at the hands of the Oakland Athletics. The White Sox released McGlothlin in March 1974, ending his baseball career.

=== Career ===
In 256 regular-season games pitched, including 201 starts, McGlothlin compiled a 67–77 won–lost mark, with 36 complete games, 11 shutouts, and a 3.61 earned run average. In 1,3001/3 career innings pitched, he permitted 1,247 hits and 418 bases on balls, striking out 709. He earned three career saves. In the postseason, he went unscored upon in one inning pitched during the 1972 National League Championship Series (his only LCS appearance), and in his two World Series starts, he allowed eight hits, four bases on balls, and eight earned runs in 81/3 innings pitched without earning a decision.

== Personal life ==
In 1973, McGlothlin purchased a two-story home with 12 acres of farmland (for the family's two horses) in Union, Kentucky, near Cincinnati.

== Illness and death ==
Less than a year after leaving the game, McGlothlin became gravely ill. Although an initial diagnosis of late-stage stomach cancer was incorrect, he proved to have an untreatable form of leukemia. In April of 1975, former teammate Johnny Bench organized a stage-show to help raise funds to be used towards McGlothlin's huge medical bills, as McGlothlin had no income at that point. McGlothlin died at age 32 on December 23, 1975, at his home in Union, Kentucky, near Cincinnati. He was survived by his wife and three children.
