= Ed Sprague Sr. =

American baseball player (1945–2020)

- Pitcher
- Born: September 16, 1945; Boston, Massachusetts, U.S.
- Died: January 10, 2020 (aged 74); Lodi, California, U.S.
- Batted: Right Threw: Right

MLB debut
- April 10, 1968, for the Oakland Athletics

Last MLB appearance
- June 5, 1976, for the Milwaukee Brewers

MLB statistics
- Win–loss record: 17–23
- Earned run average: 3.84
- Strikeouts: 188
- Stats at Baseball Reference

Teams
- Oakland Athletics (1968–1969); Cincinnati Reds (1971–1973); St. Louis Cardinals (1973); Milwaukee Brewers (1973–1976)

Edward Nelson Sprague Sr. (September 16, 1945 – January 10, 2020) was an American professional baseball pitcher who played eight seasons in Major League Baseball with four teams between 1968 and 1976. He was listed at 6 ft 4 in (1.93 m) and 195 pounds (88 kg), he batted and threw right-handed.

== Early life ==
Sprague was born in Boston. He graduated from Sunset High School in Hayward, California, in 1963.

== Career ==
Sprague was scouted while playing softball as a catcher in the 509th Infantry Regiment of the United States Army in Germany and was signed by the St. Louis Cardinals in 1966. A year later, he was traded to the Oakland Athletics. He entered the majors in 1968 with the Athletics, playing with them until 1969 before joining the Cincinnati Reds (1971–73), St. Louis Cardinals (1973) and Milwaukee Brewers (1973–76). With Milwaukee in 1974, when he set career-highs in wins (7), strikeouts (57) and earned run average (2.39) in 20 games, including 10 as a starter, before damaging knee ligaments which ended his season.

In an eight-season career, Sprague posted a 17–23 record with 188 strikeouts and a 3.84 ERA in 198 games, including 23 starts, three complete games, nine saves and 408 innings pitched.

Following his playing career, Sprague became the owner of the Stockton Ports and his wife the owner of a collegiate wood bat baseball team, the Lodi Crushers, in 2015 and 2016.

== Personal life ==
His son, Ed Jr., was the Toronto Blue Jays' first pick in the 1988 draft and played in the majors from 1991 to 2001.

Sprague died on January 10, 2020, at the age of 74.
