= Tom Hall (baseball) =

American baseball player (born 1947)

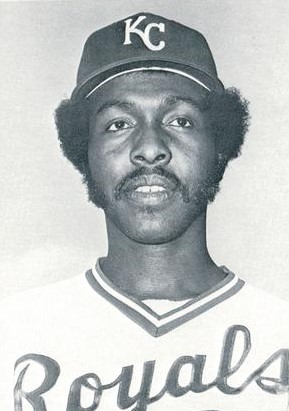
- Pitcher
- Born: November 23, 1947 (age 78); Thomasville, North Carolina, U.S.
- Batted: Left Threw: Left

MLB debut
- Aug 9, 1968, for the Minnesota Twins

Last MLB appearance
- May 21, 1977, for the Kansas City Royals

MLB statistics
- Win–loss record: 52–33
- Earned run average: 3.27
- Strikeouts: 797
- Stats at Baseball Reference

Teams
- Minnesota Twins (1968–1971); Cincinnati Reds (1972–1975); New York Mets (1975–1976); Kansas City Royals (1976–1977)

Thomas Edward Hall (born November 23, 1947) is an American former professional baseball left-handed pitcher who played in Major League Baseball (MLB) from 1968 to 1977. Listed at 6 feet (180 cm) tall and 150 pounds (68 kg), he was nicknamed "the Blade", owing to his slender physique.

== Early life ==
Hall was born in Thomasville, North Carolina, and attended Ramona High School in Riverside, California. He graduated from Riverside City College in 1966.

== Career ==
Hall was drafted by the Minnesota Twins in the third round of the 1966 MLB January Draft – Regular Phase.

Hall pitched for the Twins, Cincinnati Reds, New York Mets, and Kansas City Royals during his big league career. He was with the Reds during their early years as the "Big Red Machine", during which time they won two National League Western Division championships and one National League (NL) pennant.

Hall was traded by the Twins to the Reds for Wayne Granger on December 3, 1971. Hall made his final Major League appearance on May 21, 1977, with the Royals. He had a career record of 52-33 with 32 saves.

After retiring from baseball, Hall worked as a supervisor at Rohr, Inc. After being laid off in 1981, he joined the United States Postal Service as a mail carrier. He retired after 20 years.
