= Wayne Granger =

American baseball player (1944–2026)

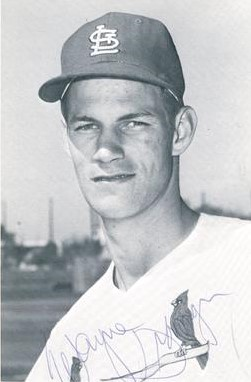
- Pitcher
- Born: March 15, 1944; Springfield, Massachusetts, U.S.
- Died: February 25, 2026 (aged 81); Oviedo, Florida, U.S.
- Batted: Right Threw: Right

MLB debut
- June 5, 1968, for the St. Louis Cardinals

Last MLB appearance
- June 25, 1976, for the Montreal Expos

MLB statistics
- Win–loss record: 35–35
- Earned run average: 3.14
- Strikeouts: 303
- Saves: 108
- Stats at Baseball Reference

Teams
- St. Louis Cardinals (1968); Cincinnati Reds (1969–1971); Minnesota Twins (1972); St. Louis Cardinals (1973); New York Yankees (1973); Chicago White Sox (1974); Houston Astros (1975); Montreal Expos (1976)

Career highlights and awards
- NL saves leader (1970); Cincinnati Reds Hall of Fame

Wayne Allan Granger (March 15, 1944 – February 25, 2026) was an American professional baseball pitcher. He played in Major League Baseball as a relief pitcher for the St. Louis Cardinals (1968, 1973), Cincinnati Reds (1969–1971), Minnesota Twins (1972), New York Yankees (1973), Chicago White Sox (1974), Houston Astros (1975), and Montreal Expos (1976). Granger was one of baseball's most effective and durable relief pitchers during the early years of Cincinnati's Big Red Machine.

== Amateur career ==
Granger graduated from Huntington High School in Huntington, Massachusetts. In 1962, just out of high school, he played for the Sagamore Clouters of the Cape Cod Baseball League (CCBL). Playing against largely collegiate competition, Granger batted .329 and led the league in home runs and RBI. He was inducted into the CCBL Hall of Fame in 2010.

He attended Springfield College where he was a pitcher on the 1965 baseball team.

Before his professional career began, Granger played two seasons in the province of Quebec in the Saguenay senior league—in 1963 for the Jonquiere Braves and in 1964 for Port-Alfred.

== Professional career ==
Granger was signed by the St. Louis Cardinals as an amateur free agent in 1965. He made his big-league debut at age 24 on June 5, 1968, in a 3–1 Cardinals win over the Houston Astros at the Astrodome, also earning his first save with one perfect inning in relief of starter Larry Jaster. The first-ever batter he faced was Bob Aspromonte, whom he struck out. The rookie sinkerballer went 4–2 with a 2.25 ERA in 34 games that season.

However, on October 11, 1968, the Cardinals traded Bobby Tolan and Granger to the Cincinnati Reds for Vada Pinson.

With the Reds in 1969 Granger posted a 9–6 record and 2.79 ERA with 27 saves in a then-National League record 90 appearances, and he won the first of two straight Sporting News Fireman of the Year awards. The following season in 1970, he set a National League record with 35 saves (since broken) while going 6–5 with a 2.66 ERA in 67 games. That season, he ranked eighth in the National League Cy Young Award voting.

In June of that year, he threw the final pitch and also earned the last victory at the Reds' venerable home Crosley Field before the team moved to Riverfront Stadium.

During Game 3 of the 1970 World Series against the Baltimore Orioles, Granger surrendered a grand slam to opposing pitcher Dave McNally. It is the only time in World Series history that a pitcher has hit a grand slam. The Reds lost the best-of-seven series in five games, and Granger never again pitched in the postseason.

In 1971, he again led the league in games pitched with 70, posting a 7–6 record with a 3.33 ERA and 11 saves. He was traded by the Reds to the Minnesota Twins for Tom Hall on December 3, 1971.

After one year with the Twins, beginning in 1973 Granger pitched for five teams in four seasons. He was reacquired by the Cardinals from the Twins for Larry Hisle and John Cumberland on November 29, 1972. Arm injuries cut short his career in 1976.

He earned induction into the Cincinnati Reds Hall of Fame in 1982, only the second Reds' relief pitcher to be so honored. Subsequently, he returned to Cincinnati for Reds reunions including the annual RedsFest and Reds Hall of Fame inductions.

== Death ==
Granger died in Oviedo, Florida, on February 25, 2026, at the age of 81.
