= Pedro Borbón =

Dominican baseball player (1946–2012)

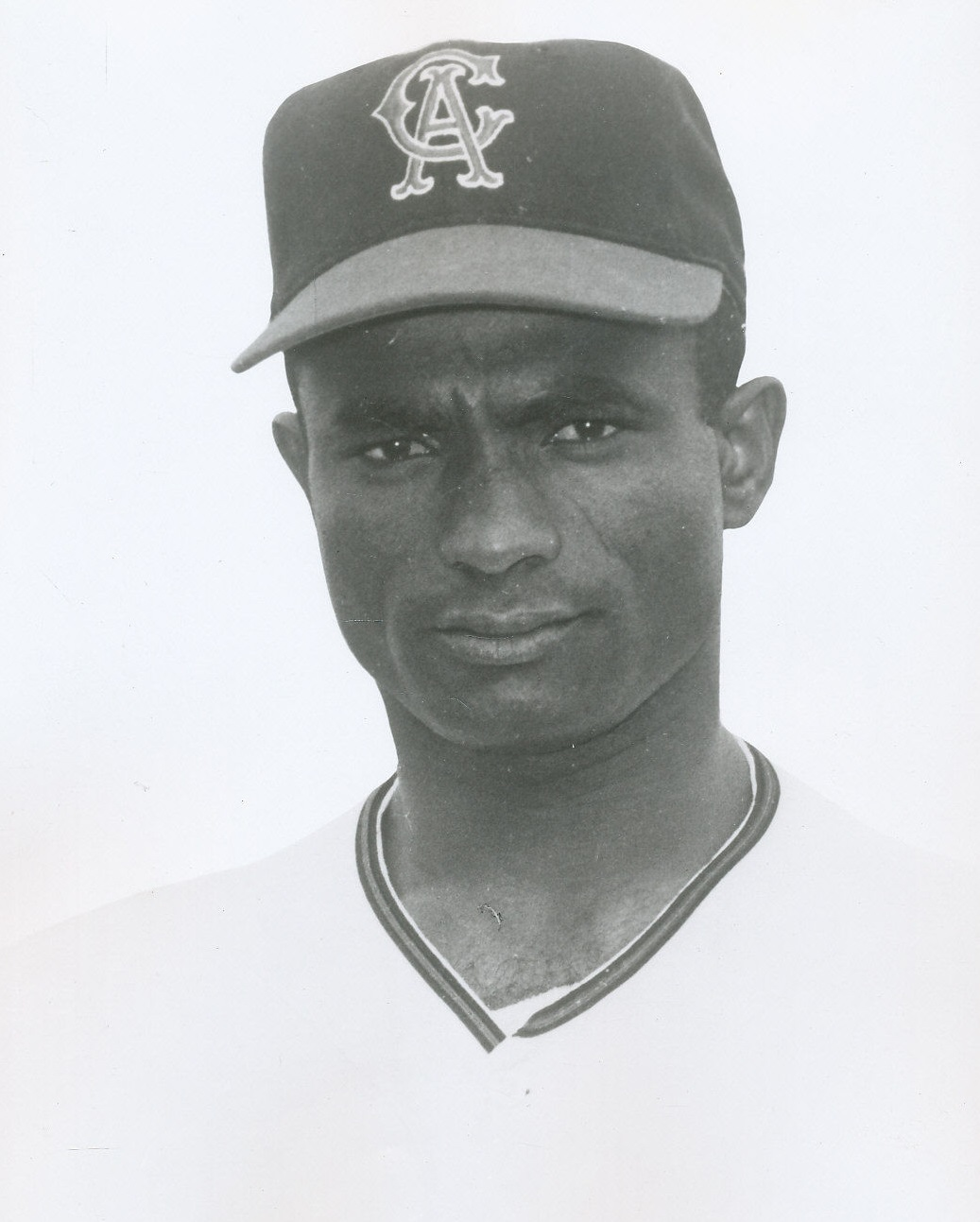
- Borbón in 1969
- Pitcher
- Born: December 2, 1946; Santa Cruz de Mao, Dominican Republic
- Died: June 4, 2012 (aged 65); Pharr, Texas, U.S.
- Batted: Right Threw: Right

MLB debut
- April 9, 1969, for the California Angels

Last MLB appearance
- May 25, 1980, for the St. Louis Cardinals

MLB statistics
- Win–loss record: 69–39
- Earned run average: 3.52
- Strikeouts: 409
- Saves: 80
- Stats at Baseball Reference

Teams
- California Angels (1969); Cincinnati Reds (1970–1979); San Francisco Giants (1979); St. Louis Cardinals (1980)

Career highlights and awards
- 2× World Series champion (1975, 1976); Cincinnati Reds Hall of Fame

Pedro Borbón Rodriguez (Spanish pronunciation: [ˈpeðɾo βoɾˈβon], December 2, 1946 – June 4, 2012) was a Dominican professional baseball pitcher. He played in Major League Baseball (MLB) most notably as a member of the Cincinnati Reds dynasty that won four National League pennants and two World Series championships between 1970 and 1976. Borbón was known for his durability, appearing in more games than any other pitcher in the National League between 1970 and 1978. He also played for the California Angels, San Francisco Giants, and St. Louis Cardinals. In 2010, Borbón was inducted into the Cincinnati Reds Hall of Fame.

== Early life ==
Borbón was born in Santa Cruz de Mao, Dominican Republic, to Ramón Jimenez and Ana Teresa Borbón.

He was signed as an amateur free agent by the St. Louis Cardinals organization in 1964 and two years later was drafted out of the Cardinals organization by the California Angels.

== Major League career ==
Borbón made his Major League debut on April 9, 1969, for the California Angels in a 7–3 home win over the Seattle Pilots. He entered the game in the fifth inning in relief of Andy Messersmith, hurling three scoreless innings with two strikeouts and allowing only two hits as he also earned his first career win. He pitched a total of 22 games for the Angels that season, with a record of 2–3 with a 6.15 earned run average.

In November 1969 he was part of a five-player trade that sent him to the Cincinnati Reds. He proved to be one of the most effective and durable relievers in baseball for the Big Red Machine; he was in the top five in the National League in games pitched in six consecutive seasons from 1972 to 1977. He pitched at least 121 innings in each of those six seasons, and was part of a tandem of reliable Reds relievers along with Clay Carroll (who was with the Reds through the 1976 season). No National League pitcher appeared in more games from 1970 to 1978 than Borbón. Borbón and Carroll, along with relievers Wayne Granger, Will McEnaney, and Rawly Eastwick, anchored a bullpen that enabled Reds manager Sparky Anderson to change pitchers frequently, earning him the nickname "Captain Hook."

Of Borbón, Reds teammate Baseball Hall of Famer Tony Pérez said, "He may have been the most critical part of that great bullpen because he was such a rubber arm. He'd give two, three innings – whatever you needed. He could pitch every night. And he wasn't intimidated by anything. I always enjoyed his company on and off the field. He was a great guy."

Borbón also excelled in the postseason. In four National League Championship Series (NLCS), he was 1–0 with a 1.26 ERA in 10 games, of which he finished seven. He was especially effective in the 1976 NLCS, pitching 4 1/3 scoreless innings of relief in a three-game Reds' sweep. He also pitched well in three World Series, pitching 10 games and going 0–1 with a 3.86 ERA as the Reds were world champions in 1975 and 1976.

After playing the entire decade of the 1970s with the Reds, he was traded midway through the 1979 season to the San Francisco Giants, where he pitched the remainder of the season. Shortly before the 1980 season, he was released and signed by the St. Louis Cardinals, for whom he pitched ten games before being released, signalling the end of his career.

Besides being known as a very good pitcher, the licensed barber was also a colorful character. A local Cincinnati urban legend claims that Borbón, incensed about being traded from the Reds in 1979, placed a voodoo losing curse on the Reds management; the last member of that front office left the team in 1990...and the Reds won the World Series that year (and have not played in one since). In 2002, Borbón admitted that this was a hoax. Another notable story involving Borbón occurred in 1973. After a bench clearing brawl, Borbon started to fight with New York Mets pitcher Buzz Capra. Following the fracas, Borbón accidentally placed a Mets hat on his head. After realizing what he had done, Borbón removed the hat and ripped a piece of it off with his teeth. A year later in another brawl during the fourth inning of a 2–1 loss to the Pittsburgh Pirates in the second game of a July 14, 1974, doubleheader at Three Rivers Stadium, Borbón pinned Pirates' hurler Daryl Patterson to the turf, began pulling out clumps of his hair and bit him in the side. Patterson lost a piece of flesh in the incident and received a precautionary tetanus shot. Borbón also bit a bouncer on the chest during an altercation at a nightclub called West Side Story in Monfort Heights, Ohio, on May 4, 1979.

Borbón was referenced in a joke in the movie Airplane! As Ted Striker's inner-dialogue is heard echoing in his mind, it resembles a stadium public address announcement, and he is heard thinking "Pinch hitting for Pedro Borbón...Manny Mota...Mota...Mota". "He was always talking about that," his son said. "A lot of people remember him by that. He liked that."

== After baseball ==
Furthering his reputation as a workhorse, even after retiring from major league baseball, he continued to pitch consistently and well in his native Dominican Republic in winter ball and in semi-pro leagues in his adopted hometown in Texas.

During the MLB strike of 1994–95, Borbón was a replacement player for the Reds.

Borbón was inducted into Cincinnati Reds Hall of Fame in 2010. He continued to return to Cincinnati for events such as the team's annual RedsFest and for the annual Reds Legends baseball camps in Ohio in which he would sometimes team up to instruct youths with his former fellow Reds reliever Clay Carroll.

Borbón's son, Pedro Borbón Jr. (born in 1967), pitched in the majors for nine seasons (1992–2003) for four teams.

Borbón died of cancer at age 65 on June 4, 2012, at his home in Pharr, Texas. He was cremated, and there was no memorial service.

He was survived by his wife Maria, son Pedro, and daughters Gabriela and Maria, who married former MLB outfielder Carlos Peguero.
