= Gary Nolan (baseball) =

American baseball player (born 1948)

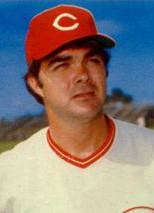
- Pitcher
- Born: May 27, 1948 (age 78); Herlong, California, U.S.
- Batted: Right Threw: Right

MLB debut
- April 15, 1967, for the Cincinnati Reds

Last MLB appearance
- September 18, 1977, for the California Angels

MLB statistics
- Win–loss record: 110–70
- Earned run average: 3.08
- Strikeouts: 1,039
- Stats at Baseball Reference

Teams
- Cincinnati Reds (1967–1973, 1975–1977); California Angels (1977)

Career highlights and awards
- All-Star (1972); 2× World Series champion (1975, 1976); Cincinnati Reds Hall of Fame

Gary Lynn Nolan (born May 27, 1948) is an American former professional baseball player. He played in Major League Baseball as a right-handed pitcher from 1967 through 1977, most notably as a member of the Cincinnati Reds dynasty that won four National League pennants and two World Series championships between 1970 and 1976. He played his final season with the California Angels. In 1983, Nolan was inducted into the Cincinnati Reds Hall of Fame.

== Early life ==
Nolan was born in Herlong, California, and his family then moved to Oroville, California, when he was young. In February 1965 at age 17 he married high school sweetheart Carole Widener. He graduated from Oroville High School in 1966. Nolan was drafted by the Cincinnati Reds in the first round (13th pick overall) of the 1966 Major League Baseball draft.

== Major League career ==
Nolan's first Major League game was at the young age of 18. A hard thrower, Nolan had a promising debut on April 15, 1967, when he struck out the side in the first inning en route to a 7–3 victory over the Houston Astros. On June 7, he struck out future Baseball Hall of Famer Willie Mays four times in one game. He had fifteen strikeouts in the game but was pulled in the eighth after giving up a three-run home run that tied it to Willie McCovey; the Giants won 4-3. "The kid was good," Mays said. He finished with a 14–8 record in that rookie season, was fourth in the National League in ERA (2.58) and in strikeouts (206), and was third in the Rookie of the Year voting behind first place finisher Tom Seaver of the Mets, and runner-up Dick Hughes of the Cardinals.

In 1970 Nolan went 18–7 with 181 strikeouts and a 3.26 ERA, helping the Reds win the NL pennant and establishing himself as one of the league's great young starting pitchers. Nolan pitched a remarkable nine innings of shutout ball to earn a victory in the 10-inning Game One of that year's National League Championship Series against Pittsburgh. But he took the loss in Game One of the World Series against the eventual champion Baltimore Orioles.

After a disappointing 12–15 record in 1971, he posted 13 victories before the 1972 All-Star Game. Selected for the NL team, Nolan was suffering from neck and shoulder pains, and was forced to withdraw from the game. After rehabbing his injuries on the disabled list, he returned to the rotation and finished the season with a 15–5 record and 1.99 ERA, leading the league in winning percentage (.750), while finishing second to Steve Carlton in ERA. In the World Series against Oakland that year, he lost Game One (six innings, three runs) and was pulled from the game early in Game Six (4 1/3 innings, one earned run).

Arm problems forced Nolan to miss most of 1973, and he missed the entire 1974 season. He returned in 1975 in good form, going 15–9 with a 3.16 ERA. In the World Series against Boston, he pitched just six innings in two starts. In 1976, he duplicated his 15–9 record and finally got his first World Series victory against the Yankees in the last game of a four-game sweep. New arm and shoulder problems bothered him in 1977, and he opted to retire.

In 1975, he earned the Hutch Award, given annually to an active Major League player who "best exemplifies the fighting spirit and competitive desire of Fred Hutchinson by persevering through adversity." It is presented by the Fred Hutchinson Cancer Research Center.

In his 10-season career, Nolan compiled a 110–70 record with 1,039 strikeouts, a 3.08 ERA, 45 complete games, 14 shutouts, and 1,674.2 innings pitched in 250 games (247 starts). In eleven post season games he was 2–2 with a 3.34 ERA covering 59.1 innings.

Nolan was an excellent fielding pitcher, committing only 3 errors in 287 total chances for a .990 fielding percentage, among the best in history for pitchers whose careers spanned 10 seasons (1,500 innings) or more.

== After baseball ==
After retiring from baseball, he worked for 25 years in Las Vegas, first as a blackjack dealer at the Golden Nugget and then as an executive host for guests of hotels/casinos including the Mirage Casino and the Gold Country Casino. In 1999, a baseball park in Oroville was renamed the Gary Nolan Sports Complex. He was elected to the Cincinnati Reds Hall of Fame in 1983.

He moved back to Oroville in 2003, where he is involved with several charitable and civic organizations and works with high school pitchers. In 2011, he was inducted into the Oroville Union High School District Hall of Fame.
