= Wayne Simpson =

American baseball player (1948–2024)

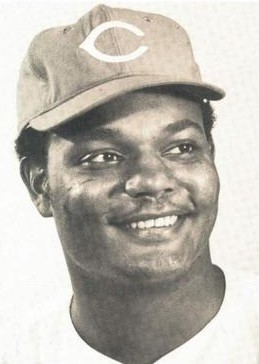
- Pitcher
- Born: December 2, 1948; Los Angeles, California, U.S.
- Died: December 12, 2024 (aged 76); Carson, California, U.S.
- Batted: Right Threw: Right

MLB debut
- April 9, 1970, for the Cincinnati Reds

Last MLB appearance
- September 29, 1977, for the California Angels

MLB statistics
- Win–loss record: 36–31
- Earned run average: 4.37
- Strikeouts: 353
- Stats at Baseball Reference

Teams
- Cincinnati Reds (1970–1972); Kansas City Royals (1973); Philadelphia Phillies (1975); California Angels (1977)

Career highlights and awards
- All-Star (1970)

Wayne Kirby Simpson (December 2, 1948 – December 12, 2024) was an American professional baseball player who pitched in the Major Leagues from 1970 to 1975 and in 1977. He played for the Cincinnati Reds, Kansas City Royals, Philadelphia Phillies, and California Angels. Hank Aaron got his 3,000th career hit off Simpson.

In 1967, as a high school senior at Centennial High School in Compton, California, Simpson was drafted in the first round in the June MLB draft by the Cincinnati Reds with the 8th overall pick. Simpson at 6-foot-3, 220 pounds, was a big, hard thrower, but his minor league seasons were plagued by wildness. In three minor league seasons, Simpson had 298 walks, 66 wild pitches, and hit 26 batters in just 432 total innings pitched.

In the winter of 1969–1970, while pitching winter ball in Puerto Rico, Simpson harnessed his control and blossomed as a pitcher. However, his heavy workload there contributed to his later shoulder problems.

Simpson made the Reds as a 21-year-old rookie to start the 1970 season. There he had the luxury of working with Gold Glove winning catcher Johnny Bench. Simpson was a revelation. After going 7–13 in 1969 for the Reds' Triple A farm team in Indianapolis, he was almost unbeatable for the Reds. Simpson has the highest Game Score (85) in Reds history for a pitching debut, April 9, 1970. He began the year by winning 13 of his first 14 decisions (the loss came when a dropped pop fly allowed two unearned runs), including tossing a one-hitter, a two-hitter, and a three-hitter, in helping the Reds to a 70–30 start. Simpson was the only rookie pitcher selected for the 1970 Major League Baseball All-Star Game, though he didn't pitch.

In the days before young pitchers were kept on strict "pitch counts," Simpson often threw a high number of pitches per game, (100–130). Though he was more consistently around the plate than he was as a minor leaguer, Simpson still averaged about four walks and six strikeouts per nine innings. His earned run average stayed below 3.00 for most of the season. Simpson had 14 wins by July 26. He blew out his rotator cuff on July 31, yet despite the severity of the injury, he tried to get back in action twice (on August 14 and September 13).

Cincinnati made it to the World Series in 1970, but Simpson did not pitch in the postseason. He finished the season with a 14–3 record and a 3.02 earned run average.

Simpson's injury predated, by several years, the early examples of rotator cuff surgery, the progress of which has helped at least some major league pitchers effectively recover from such a setback. He was traded along with Hal McRae to the Royals for Roger Nelson and Richie Scheinblum on December 1, 1972. Simpson pitched another six seasons in the majors after his brilliant rookie season, but was never able to regain the same velocity and effectiveness.

Simpson finished his career in Mexico, where he developed thoracic outlet syndrome, which threatened him with the loss of his pitching arm and even his life. However, he recovered, though he endured several corrective procedures.

Simpson died on December 12, 2024, at the age of 76.
