= Clay Carroll =

American baseball player (born 1941)

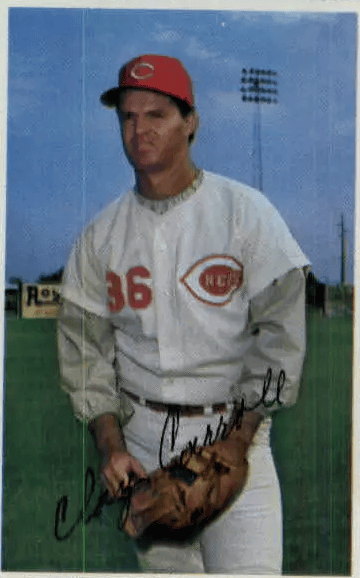
- Pitcher
- Born: May 2, 1941 (age 85); Clanton, Alabama, U.S.
- Batted: Right Threw: Right

MLB debut
- September 2, 1964, for the Milwaukee Braves

Last MLB appearance
- October 1, 1978, for the Pittsburgh Pirates

MLB statistics
- Win–loss record: 96–73
- Earned run average: 2.94
- Strikeouts: 681
- Saves: 143
- Stats at Baseball Reference

Teams
- Milwaukee / Atlanta Braves (1964–1968); Cincinnati Reds (1968–1975); Chicago White Sox (1976); St. Louis Cardinals (1977); Chicago White Sox (1977); Pittsburgh Pirates (1978)

Career highlights and awards
- 2× All-Star (1971, 1972); World Series champion (1975); NL saves leader (1972); Cincinnati Reds Hall of Fame

Clay Palmer Carroll (born May 2, 1941) is an American former professional baseball player. He played in Major League Baseball as a right-handed pitcher from 1964 through 1978, most notably as a member of the Cincinnati Reds dynasty that won three division titles, one National League pennant and the 1975 World Series title. He also played for the Milwaukee / Atlanta Braves, Chicago White Sox, St. Louis Cardinals and the Pittsburgh Pirates.

A two-time All-Star, Carroll was one of the top relief pitchers in Major League Baseball during the mid-1970s when the Cincinnati Reds became known as the Big Red Machine for their dominance of the National League. In 1972, Carroll led the National League in saves and was named The Sporting News Fireman of the Year. He ranks third all-time among Red pitchers in game appearances. Carroll was inducted into the Cincinnati Reds Hall of Fame in 1980.

== Early life ==
Carroll was one of nine children of a cotton mill worker who died in 1966. Growing up in Clanton, Alabama, Carroll went to Chilton County High School and also worked many jobs, including as a curb-service boy at a restaurant, at the cotton mill where his father worked, and loading watermelons onto trucks.

== Professional career ==
Carroll was signed by the Milwaukee Braves as an amateur free agent in 1961, and made his major league debut at age 23 on September 2, 1964, hurling two shutout innings against the Cardinals.

Carroll was acquired along with Tony Cloninger and Woody Woodward by the Reds from the Atlanta Braves for Milt Pappas, Bob Johnson and Ted Davidson on June 11, 1968. Nicknamed "Hawk" due to his profile likeness of the bird, he was selected to the National League All-Star team in 1971 and 1972. He led the National League in saves in 1972 with 37, and finished tied for fifth in the Cy Young Award voting. The 37 saves stood as a National League record until Bruce Sutter broke it in 1984 with 45 saves for the St. Louis Cardinals. He was selected as the Sporting News Reliever of the Year in 1972 for the National League.

Carroll's best seasons were with the Reds from 1968 to 1975, which earned him a place in the Cincinnati Reds Hall of Fame.

Carroll pitched in three World Series for the Reds, including the 1975 World Series which the Reds won in seven games over the Boston Red Sox. Carroll starred in the 1970 World Series. He appeared in five of the six games, hurling nine shutout innings with 11 strikeouts. Carroll, along with rookie Don Gullett, paced an injury-riddled staff that was otherwise ineffective against Baltimore. Carroll was the winning pitcher in the Reds' only victory against the Orioles. Overall in the postseason, Carroll boasted a 4-2 record with two saves, a blown save, and a 1.39 ERA in 22 appearances, allowing just five earned runs in 32 1/3 innings.

He was traded by the Reds to the Chicago White Sox for Rich Hinton and minor league catcher Jeff Sovern on December 12, 1975. After going 4–4 with six saves and a 2.56 ERA in 29 appearances with the White Sox, he was dealt to the Cardinals for Lerrin LaGrow during spring training on March 23, 1977.

== Personal life ==
Carroll and his ex-wife Judy are the parents of two daughters, Connie and Lori, along with a son, Brett (sometimes reported as Bret). The Carrolls divorced in 1981.

In 1983 Carroll married Frances Nowitzke, a widow with children of her own. During a November 1985 shooting in their home in Bradenton, Florida, Carroll was wounded, and his wife Frances, 53, and Carroll's son Bret(t), 11, were shot and killed, by Frances's 26 year old son, Frederick. Carroll's stepson was convicted of murder and sentenced to death in Florida’s electric chair. Several years later a new trial was ordered, at which Frederick was given a life sentence he continues to serve.

Carroll frequently returns to Cincinnati for the team's annual RedsFest event, including in December 2012. He is a member of the Alabama Sports Hall of Fame.

== See also ==
- TSN Reliever of the Year
- Cincinnati Reds Hall of Fame
- List of Major League Baseball annual saves leaders
- List of Major League Baseball career saves leaders
