= Don Gullett =

American baseball player (1951–2024)

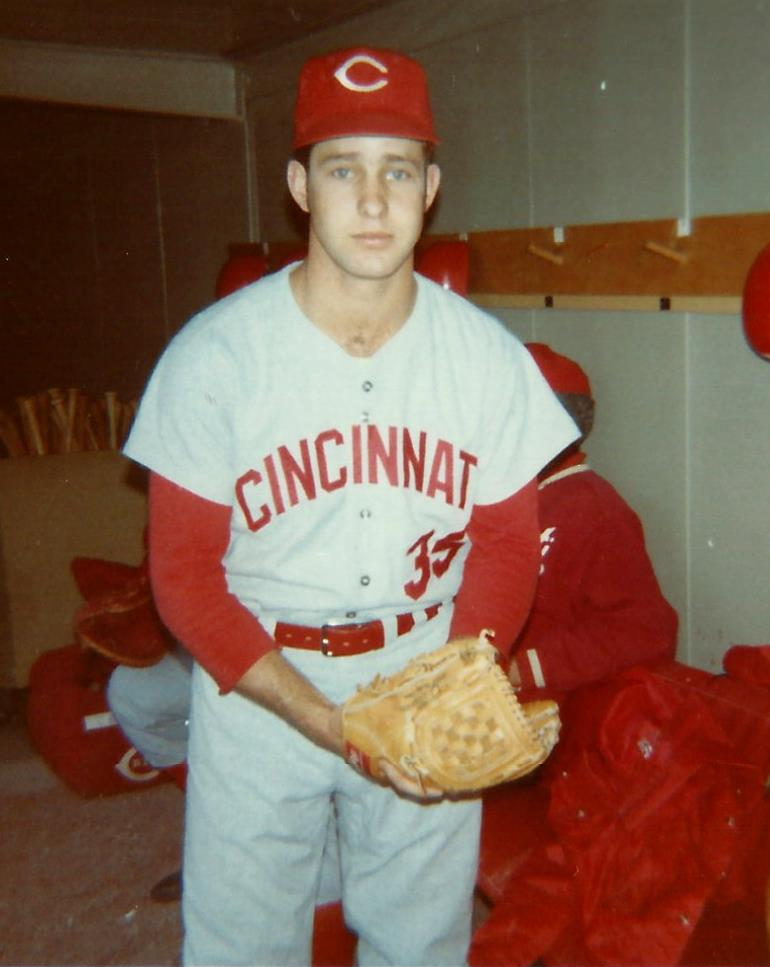
- Pitcher
- Born: January 6, 1951; Lynn, Kentucky, U.S.
- Died: February 14, 2024 (aged 73); Columbus, Ohio, U.S.
- Batted: Right Threw: Left

MLB debut
- April 10, 1970, for the Cincinnati Reds

Last MLB appearance
- July 9, 1978, for the New York Yankees

MLB statistics
- Win–loss record: 109–50
- Earned run average: 3.11
- Strikeouts: 921
- Stats at Baseball Reference

Teams
- Cincinnati Reds (1970–1976); New York Yankees (1977–1978)

Career highlights and awards
- 3× World Series champion (1975–1977); Cincinnati Reds Hall of Fame

Donald Edward Gullett (January 6, 1951 – February 14, 2024) was an American professional baseball player and coach. He played in Major League Baseball as a left-handed pitcher from 1970 through 1978. He was a member of the Cincinnati Reds Big Red Machine dynasty that won four National League pennants and two World Series championships between 1970 and 1976. Gullett was also a member of the New York Yankees teams that won two consecutive World Series championships in 1977 and 1978.

After his playing career, Gullett served as pitching coach for the Reds from 1993 to 2005. In 2002, he was inducted into the Cincinnati Reds Hall of Fame.

== Early life ==
Gullett was born in Lynn, Kentucky, and attended McKell High School in South Shore, where he was an outstanding three-sports athlete in baseball, football, and basketball. He began to pitch while in eighth grade. As a high school pitcher, he once tossed a perfect game—including striking out 20 of the 21 hitters he faced. Gullett excelled as a high school football player as well, once scoring 72 points in a single game. He ran for 11 touchdowns and kicked 6 extra points. In his senior year he was named all-state in baseball, football, and basketball. Gullett's legacy is remembered in a monument on the courthouse lawn in Greenup County, Kentucky with the inscription: "This is Don Gullett Country."

== Professional career ==
=== Cincinnati Reds (1970–1976) ===
The Reds selected Gullett in the first round of the 1969 Major League Baseball draft. He pitched for the Sioux Falls Packers of the Northern League that season.

In 1970, Gullett impressed the Reds in spring training. Despite his inexperience, he made the big league roster of a team that would go on to win the NL pennant. Pitching in relief of starter Ray Washburn, Gullett debuted on April 10, 1970, on the road against the San Francisco Giants. In his rookie season, Gullett appeared in 44 games (42 in relief) posting a 5–2 record and a 2.43 earned run average. In the 1970 World Series against the Baltimore Orioles, Gullett pitched 6 2/3 innings and allowed just one earned run (1.35 earned run average) as he and veteran Clay Carroll helped keep an injury-riddled pitching staff competitive in the series. During the 1972 season Gullett suffered from hepatitis. That season turned out to be the only one in which he had a losing record.

Gullett was the pitcher when Willie Mays hit the 660th and last home run of his Major League Baseball career on August 17, 1973. Gullett also surrendered Hank Aaron's 660th home run on August 6, 1972. He went 6–1 with a 1.83 ERA and 42 strikeouts in 54 innings pitched in July 1974, winning the National League Player of the Month Award. In a 1975 National League Championship Series game against the Pittsburgh Pirates, Gullett pitched a complete game and hit a single and home run, collecting three runs batted in.

Hall of Fame Manager Sparky Anderson predicted that Gullett would one day enter the Hall of Fame. As noted in the Gullett's biography in the Society for American Baseball Research (SABR): "The three best southpaws of the previous generation—Warren Spahn, Whitey Ford, and Sandy Koufax—were in the Hall of Fame. When Gullett celebrated his 25th birthday in 1976 he had already won 91 games—many more than Spahn (8), Ford (43), and Koufax (53) had won by that age."

=== New York Yankees (1977–1978) ===
Following the 1976 season, Gullett became a free agent and signed with the New York Yankees, the month after his Reds had swept them in the World Series. His fourth start with New York came on a rainy day at Memorial Stadium in Baltimore on April 25. During the fourth inning, Gullett slipped and fell on the wet pitching mound, spraining his ankle and straining a muscle in his neck. The injury required him to wear a neck brace and miss some starts. In his return on May 7, he struck out 10 and threw 154 pitches in a complete game, 11–2 victory over the Oakland Athletics. He had a 14–4 season with the Yankees in 1977.

Shoulder surgery to repair a double tear of his rotator cuff in 1978 signaled the end of Gullett's career at age 27. He was released by the Yankees after the 1980 season.

During a nine-year career, Gullett accumulated 109 wins and posted a 3.11 earned run average and tallied 921 strikeouts. Playing for only nine seasons, Gullett was a member of six World Series teams (1970, '72, '75, '76, '77, and '78), including four consecutive world champions ('75 and '76 Reds, and '77 and '78 Yankees). He was injured during the 1978 World Series and left off the Yankees roster.

=== Later baseball career ===
In 1989, Gullett played for the St. Lucie Legends of the Senior Professional Baseball Association.

In 1993, Gullett rejoined the Reds as pitching coach. He held the position until being fired mid-season in 2005.

Gullett was inducted into the Cincinnati Reds Hall of Fame in 2002.

== Personal life ==
Gullett married his wife, Cathy, in 1969. They had a son and two daughters.

Gullett farmed in his hometown of Lynn in Greenup County, Kentucky, growing tobacco as his primary crop during the 1970s and 1980s. On August 1, 1977, the Kentucky State Police discovered about 800 cannabis plants being cultivated on his farmland. Gullett denied any knowledge of the plants. The caretaker of the property, his brother Jack, was indicted on a charge of trafficking in a controlled substance the following month on September 30.

Gullett suffered a heart attack in 1986. He had been a cigarette smoker. He had another heart attack in 1990 and had triple bypass cardiac surgery in June of that year.

Gullett died on February 14, 2024, at OhioHealth Riverside Methodist Hospital in Columbus, Ohio, due to heart issues and other natural causes at the age of 73.

Awards and achievements
Preceded by Buzz Capra	National League Player of the Month; July 1974	Succeeded by Lou Brock
