= 1970 Philadelphia Phillies season =

Major League Baseball season

1970 Philadelphia Phillies
- League: National League
- Division: East
- Ballpark: Connie Mack Stadium
- City: Philadelphia
- Owners: R. R. M. Carpenter, Jr.
- General managers: John J. Quinn
- Managers: Frank Lucchesi
- Television: WFIL
- Radio: WCAU (By Saam, Bill Campbell, Richie Ashburn)

The 1970 Philadelphia Phillies season was the 88th season for the franchise in Philadelphia. The Phillies finished in fifth place in the National League East with a record of 73–88, fifteen and a half games behind the first place Pittsburgh Pirates. The Phillies were playing their final season of home games at Connie Mack Stadium, before moving into their new facility, Veterans Stadium, at the start of the following season.

== Offseason ==
- October 7, 1969: Dick Allen, Jerry Johnson and Cookie Rojas were traded by the Phillies to the St. Louis Cardinals for Curt Flood, Byron Browne, Joe Hoerner, and Tim McCarver. Curt Flood refused to report to his new team. The Cardinals sent Willie Montañez to the Phillies on April 8, 1970, and Bob Browning (minors) to the Phillies on August 30 as compensation.
- November 17, 1969: Johnny Callison and a player to be named later were traded by the Phillies to the Chicago Cubs for Oscar Gamble and Dick Selma. The Phillies completed the deal by sending Larry Colton to the Cubs in January 1970.
- January 1970: Rich Barry was purchased from the Phillies by the Hawaii Islanders.
- Prior to 1970 season: Doc Edwards was released by the Phillies.

== Regular season ==
Against the San Francisco Giants on May 2, 1970, Phillies starting catcher Tim McCarver broke his finger on a foul tip by Willie Mays. McCarver was replaced by Mike Ryan. Two batters later, Ryan broke his finger on a slide at home plate by Willie McCovey. Ryan finished the inning but left the game. In June 1970, the series of injuries left the Phillies short a catcher and they activated Doc Edwards, who at the time was their bullpen coach. Edwards responded with two hits in his first game back and then caught a Jim Bunning–Dick Selma two-hitter.

Beginning May 22, seven more players were injured including Johnny Briggs, Don Money, Ricardo Joseph, Mike Compton, Oscar Gamble, Tony Taylor, and Del Bates. Bill Giles, Phillies’ Vice President of Business Operations, retained hexologist Jacob Zook from Lancaster, Pennsylvania to paint Pennsylvania Dutch hex signs to keep away jinxes. Giles had Zook paint three 24-inch-diameter hex signs and had them attached to the outer roof of the Phillies’ dugout at Connie Mack Stadium.

=== Season standings ===
NL East
Team	W	L	Pct.	GB	Home	Road
Pittsburgh Pirates	89	73	.549	—	50‍–‍32	39‍–‍41
Chicago Cubs	84	78	.519	5	46‍–‍34	38‍–‍44
New York Mets	83	79	.512	6	44‍–‍38	39‍–‍41
St. Louis Cardinals	76	86	.469	13	34‍–‍47	42‍–‍39
Philadelphia Phillies	73	88	.453	15½	40‍–‍40	33‍–‍48
Montreal Expos	73	89	.451	16	39‍–‍41	34‍–‍48

=== Record vs. opponents ===
1970 National League record Sources:
Team	ATL	CHC	CIN	HOU	LAD	MON	NYM	PHI	PIT	SD	SF	STL
Atlanta	—	8–4	5–13	9–9	6–12	6–6	6–6	7–5	6–6	9–9	7–11	7–5
Chicago	4–8	—	7–5	7–5	6–6	13–5	7–11	9–9	8–10	9–3	7–5	7–11
Cincinnati	13–5	5–7	—	15–3	13–5	7–5	8–4	7–5	8–4	8–10	9–9	9–3
Houston	9–9	5–7	3–15	—	8–10	8–4	6–6	4–8	6–6	14–4	10–8	6–6
Los Angeles	12–6	6–6	5–13	10–8	—	8–4	7–5	6–5	6–6	11–7	9–9	7–5
Montreal	6–6	5–13	5–7	4–8	4–8	—	10–8	11–7	9–9	6–6	6–6	7–11
New York	6–6	11–7	4–8	6–6	5–7	8–10	—	13–5	6–12	6–6	6–6	12–6
Philadelphia	5-7	9–9	5–7	8–4	5–6	7–11	5–13	—	4–14	9–3	8–4	8–10
Pittsburgh	6–6	10–8	4–8	6–6	6–6	9–9	12–6	14–4	—	6–6	4–8	12–6
San Diego	9–9	3–9	10–8	4–14	7–11	6–6	6–6	3–9	6–6	—	5–13	4–8
San Francisco	11–7	5–7	9–9	8–10	9–9	6–6	6–6	4–8	8–4	13–5	—	7–5
St. Louis	5–7	11–7	3–9	6–6	5–7	11–7	6–12	10–8	6–12	8–4	5–7	—

=== Notable transactions ===
- April 13, 1970: Rubén Amaro was signed as a free agent by the Phillies.
- June 4, 1970: Fred Andrews was drafted by the Phillies in the 8th round of the 1970 Major League Baseball draft.
- June 6, 1970: Doc Edwards was signed as a free agent by the Phillies.

=== Game log ===
1970 game log (Overall Record: 73–88)
April (10–9)

#	Date	Opponent	Score	Win	Loss	Save	Attendance	Record
1	April 7	Cubs	2–0	**Chris Short** (1–0)	Ferguson Jenkins (0–1)	None	15,918	1–0
2	April 9	Cubs	5–3	**Bill Wilson** (1–0)	Ken Holtzman (0–1)	**Joe Hoerner** (1)	5,075	2–0
3	April 10	Pirates	2–0	**Woodie Fryman** (1–0)	Bob Veale (0–1)	None	3,663	3–0
4	April 11	Pirates	0–4	Luke Walker (1–0)	**Grant Jackson** (0–1)	Chuck Hartenstein (1)	7,673	3–1
5	April 12	Pirates	1–3 (10)	Steve Blass (1–0)	**Jim Bunning** (0–1)	None	22,395	3–2
6	April 14	@ Cubs	4–5	Ken Holtzman (1–1)	**Chris Short** (1–1)	None	36,316	3–3
7	April 15	@ Cubs	1–5	Bill Hands (1–0)	**Rick Wise** (0–1)	None	7,120	3–4
8	April 16	@ Cubs	5–6 (10)	Hank Aguirre (2–0)	**Joe Hoerner** (0–1)	None	5,341	3–5
9	April 17	@ Mets	0–6	Tom Seaver (2–0)	**Grant Jackson** (0–2)	None	5,951	3–6
10	April 18	@ Mets	0–7	Nolan Ryan (1–0)	**Jim Bunning** (0–2)	None	23,500	3–7
11	April 19 (1)	@ Mets	3–2 (10)	**Rick Wise** (1–1)	Jerry Koosman (0–2)	None	see 2nd game	4–7
12	April 19 (2)	@ Mets	2–10	Jim McAndrew (1–1)	**Chris Short** (1–2)	Ron Taylor (3)	49,898	4–8
–	April 21	Giants	Postponed (cold weather); Makeup: August 1 as a traditional double-header					
13	April 22	Giants	6–1	**Woodie Fryman** (2–0)	Rich Robertson (0–1)	**Dick Selma** (1)	6,045	5–8
14	April 24	@ Padres	5–4	**Grant Jackson** (1–2)	Pat Dobson (1–2)	**Dick Selma** (2)	7,398	6–8
15	April 25	@ Padres	1–0	**Jim Bunning** (1–2)	Al Santorini (1–3)	**Dick Selma** (3)	9,144	7–8
16	April 26	@ Padres	3–2	**Chris Short** (2–2)	Dave Roberts (1–2)	**Dick Selma** (4)	14,480	8–8
17	April 27	@ Dodgers	4–3	**Rick Wise** (2–1)	Don Sutton (3–2)	**Joe Hoerner** (2)	9,447	9–8
18	April 28	@ Dodgers	3–2 (10)	**Dick Selma** (1–0)	Alan Foster (2–2)	**Joe Hoerner** (3)	22,772	10–8
19	April 29	@ Dodgers	1–6	Claude Osteen (2–3)	**Grant Jackson** (1–3)	None	10,777	10–9

May (10–18)

#	Date	Opponent	Score	Win	Loss	Save	Attendance	Record
20	May 1	@ Giants	1–3	Rich Robertson (1–2)	**Jim Bunning** (1–3)	None	5,328	10–10
21	May 2	@ Giants	1–7	Gaylord Perry (3–3)	**Chris Short** (2–3)	None	7,422	10–11
22	May 3 (1)	@ Giants	8–6 (13)	**Joe Hoerner** (1–1)	Ron Bryant (2–4)	None	see 2nd game	11–11
23	May 3 (2)	@ Giants	13–6	**Lowell Palmer** (1–0)	Frank Reberger (0–2)	None	17,153	12–11
24	May 5	Padres	8–11	Dave Roberts (3–2)	**Dick Selma** (1–1)	None	4,382	12–12
25	May 6	Padres	4–3	**Dick Selma** (2–1)	Clay Kirby (1–3)	**Joe Hoerner** (4)	2,263	13–12
26	May 7	Padres	2–8	Pat Dobson (3–3)	**Chris Short** (2–4)	Ron Herbel (5)	2,045	13–13
27	May 8	Dodgers	4–8 (12)	José Peña (1–0)	**Joe Hoerner** (1–2)	None	5,170	13–14
28	May 9	Dodgers	4–9 (14)	Fred Norman (1–0)	**Dick Selma** (2–2)	José Peña (2)	12,780	13–15
29	May 10	Dodgers	0–7	Don Sutton (4–4)	**Grant Jackson** (1–4)	None	8,840	13–16
30	May 11	@ Cardinals	0–3	Steve Carlton (2–4)	**Jim Bunning** (1–4)	None	11,310	13–17
31	May 12	@ Cardinals	5–9	Chuck Taylor (1–2)	**Lowell Palmer** (1–1)	None	10,454	13–18
32	May 13	Expos	6–7	Claude Raymond (2–1)	**Rick Wise** (2–2)	None	2,470	13–19
–	May 14	Expos	Postponed (rain); Makeup: June 22 as a traditional double-header					
33	May 15	Mets	0–4	Tom Seaver (7–1)	**Woodie Fryman** (2–1)	None	6,373	13–20
34	May 16	Mets	0–6	Jerry Koosman (2–2)	**Grant Jackson** (1–5)	None	4,826	13–21
–	May 17	Mets	Postponed (rain); Makeup: July 2 as a traditional double-header					
35	May 18	@ Pirates	1–2	Bob Moose (3–3)	**Jim Bunning** (1–5)	None	5,796	13–22
36	May 19	@ Pirates	2–0	**Chris Short** (3–4)	Dock Ellis (2–4)	None	6,251	14–22
37	May 20	@ Pirates	2–3 (14)	Bruce Dal Canton (2–0)	**Dick Selma** (2–3)	None	5,977	14–23
38	May 21	Cardinals	4–3	**Joe Hoerner** (2–2)	Frank Linzy (2–2)	None	11,769	15–23
39	May 22	Cardinals	3–6	Frank Linzy (3–2)	**Mike Jackson** (0–1)	None	12,003	15–24
40	May 23	Cardinals	1–3	Bob Gibson (3–3)	**Jim Bunning** (1–6)	None	12,333	15–25
41	May 24	Cardinals	6–5 (10)	**Mike Jackson** (1–1)	Chuck Taylor (1–3)	None	11,939	16–25
42	May 26	@ Expos	3–2	**Rick Wise** (3–2)	Bill Stoneman (2–7)	**Dick Selma** (5)	14,010	17–25
43	May 27	@ Expos	3–0	**Woodie Fryman** (3–1)	Dan McGinn (3–4)	None	6,913	18–25
44	May 28	@ Expos	5–3 (11)	**Joe Hoerner** (3–2)	Bill Dillman (1–1)	**Dick Selma** (6)	14,329	19–25
45	May 29	@ Braves	2–5	Pat Jarvis (5–3)	**Chris Short** (3–5)	None	5,565	19–26
46	May 30	@ Braves	7–5	**Jim Bunning** (2–6)	Gary Neibauer (0–3)	**Joe Hoerner** (5)	11,064	20–26
47	May 31	@ Braves	1–9	Jim Nash (7–1)	**Rick Wise** (3–3)	None	18,482	20–27

June (12–13)

#	Date	Opponent	Score	Win	Loss	Save	Attendance	Record
48	June 2	@ Reds	2–7 (8)	Wayne Simpson (7–1)	**Woodie Fryman** (3–2)	None	10,542	20–28
49	June 3	@ Reds	11–4	**Jim Bunning** (3–6)	Pedro Borbón (0–2)	**Dick Selma** (7)	5,887	21–28
50	June 5	@ Astros	7–8 (11)	Jim Ray (3–2)	**Dick Selma** (2–4)	None	12,292	21–29
51	June 6	@ Astros	7–3	**Rick Wise** (4–3)	Don Wilson (1–2)	**Joe Hoerner** (6)	18,644	22–29
52	June 7	@ Astros	10–3	**Woodie Fryman** (4–2)	Larry Dierker (8–6)	None	16,353	23–29
53	June 9	Braves	2–1	**Jim Bunning** (4–6)	Pat Jarvis (6–4)	**Dick Selma** (8)	15,810	24–29
54	June 10	Braves	1–5	George Stone (6–1)	**Chris Short** (3–6)	None	9,213	24–30
55	June 11	Braves	4–6	Jim Nash (8–2)	**Rick Wise** (4–4)	Bob Priddy (4)	7,862	24–31
56	June 12	Reds	1–3	Wayne Simpson (9–1)	**Woodie Fryman** (4–3)	None	10,553	24–32
57	June 13	Reds	6–3	**Jim Bunning** (5–6)	Gary Nolan (7–3)	None	18,568	25–32
58	June 14	Reds	1–10	Jim McGlothlin (9–3)	**Chris Short** (3–7)	None	16,658	25–33
–	June 15	Astros	Postponed (rain); Makeup: August 21 as a traditional double-header					
59	June 16	Astros	2–1 (13)	**Joe Hoerner** (4–2)	Jim Bouton (2–4)	None	3,708	26–33
60	June 17	Astros	4–2	**Woodie Fryman** (5–3)	Larry Dierker (8–7)	**Barry Lersch** (1)	6,767	27–33
61	June 19	@ Mets	3–13	Tom Seaver (10–5)	**Jim Bunning** (5–7)	None	43,866	27–34
62	June 20	@ Mets	2–1	**Chris Short** (4–7)	Jerry Koosman (2–4)	None	41,897	28–34
–	June 21	@ Mets	Postponed (rain); Makeup: September 9 as a traditional double-header					
63	June 22 (1)	Expos	6–0	**Woodie Fryman** (6–3)	Bill Stoneman (4–9)	None	see 2nd game	29–34
64	June 22 (2)	Expos	3–2	**Rick Wise** (5–4)	Steve Renko (2–4)	None	20,535	30–34
65	June 23	Expos	1–2	Dan McGinn (4–5)	**Jim Bunning** (5–8)	Claude Raymond (11)	8,221	30–35
66	June 24	Expos	0–8	Carl Morton (7–5)	**Chris Short** (4–8)	None	6,869	30–36
67	June 25	Expos	3–2 (11)	**Joe Hoerner** (5–2)	Claude Raymond (3–5)	None	5,065	31–36
68	June 26	@ Cardinals	0–7	Bob Gibson (10–3)	**Rick Wise** (5–5)	None	40,221	31–37
69	June 27	@ Cardinals	8–9	Ted Abernathy (1–0)	**Joe Hoerner** (5–3)	Sal Campisi (2)	20,549	31–38
70	June 28 (1)	@ Cardinals	4–5	Mike Torrez (6–7)	**Dick Selma** (2–5)	None	see 2nd game	31–39
71	June 28 (2)	@ Cardinals	8–3 (10)	**Dick Selma** (3–5)	Billy McCool (0–3)	None	38,194	32–39
–	June 29	@ Expos	Postponed (rain); Makeup: July 1 as a traditional double-header					
72	June 30	@ Expos	1–8	Steve Renko (4–4)	**Rick Wise** (5–6)	None	20,038	32–40

July (14–14)

#	Date	Opponent	Score	Win	Loss	Save	Attendance	Record
73	July 1 (1)	@ Expos	1–11	Rich Nye (2–0)	**Woodie Fryman** (6–4)	None	see 2nd game	32–41
74	July 1 (2)	@ Expos	1–4	Dan McGinn (5–6)	**Grant Jackson** (1–6)	Howie Reed (2)	25,623	32–42
75	July 2 (1)	Mets	6–1	**Jim Bunning** (6–8)	Gary Gentry (7–5)	**Dick Selma** (9)	see 2nd game	33–42
76	July 2 (2)	Mets	3–2	**Chris Short** (5–8)	Don Cardwell (0–2)	**Dick Selma** (10)	24,474	34–42
77	July 3	Mets	3–4	Ray Sadecki (6–2)	**Rick Wise** (5–7)	Rich Folkers (1)	10,508	34–43
78	July 4	Mets	2–7	Tom Seaver (13–5)	**Grant Jackson** (1–7)	None	7,866	34–44
79	July 5	Mets	4–5	Jerry Koosman (5–4)	**Woodie Fryman** (6–5)	Danny Frisella (1)	12,609	34–45
80	July 6	Pirates	5–7	Jim Nelson (4–0)	**Jim Bunning** (6–9)	Dave Giusti (13)	6,145	34–46
81	July 7	Pirates	2–4	Bob Veale (6–10)	**Chris Short** (5–9)	Dave Giusti (14)	6,938	34–47
82	July 8	Pirates	2–0	**Rick Wise** (6–7)	Steve Blass (6–10)	None	7,038	35–47
83	July 10	@ Cubs	0–2	Ferguson Jenkins (10–10)	**Grant Jackson** (1–8)	None	22,399	35–48
84	July 11	@ Cubs	10–4	**Joe Hoerner** (6–3)	Roberto Rodríguez (1–1)	**Barry Lersch** (2)	25,972	36–48
85	July 12	@ Cubs	2–10	Ken Holtzman (9–7)	**Chris Short** (5–10)	None	28,270	36–49
–	July 14	**1970 Major League Baseball All-Star Game at Riverfront Stadium in Cincinnati**						
86	July 16	@ Padres	10–7	**Dick Selma** (4–5)	Ron Willis (1–1)	**Joe Hoerner** (7)	6,938	37–49
87	July 17	@ Padres	8–3	**Rick Wise** (7–7)	Clay Kirby (5–11)	None	5,758	38–49
88	July 18	@ Padres	7–4	**Jim Bunning** (7–9)	Earl Wilson (4–7)	**Dick Selma** (11)	4,317	39–49
89	July 19 (1)	@ Dodgers	9–4	**Fred Wenz** (1–0)	Jim Brewer (4–4)	**Dick Selma** (12)	see 2nd game	40–49
90	July 19 (2)	@ Dodgers	4–2	**Barry Lersch** (1–0)	Pete Mikkelsen (0–1)	None	28,396	41–49
91	July 20	@ Dodgers	0–5	Bill Singer (7–3)	**Woodie Fryman** (6–6)	None	12,454	41–50
92	July 21	@ Giants	9–6	**Rick Wise** (8–7)	Juan Marichal (3–9)	**Joe Hoerner** (8)	3,418	42–50
93	July 22	@ Giants	5–2	**Jim Bunning** (8–9)	Gaylord Perry (14–9)	**Dick Selma** (13)	4,567	43–50
94	July 24	Padres	4–3	**Grant Jackson** (2–8)	Ron Herbel (6–3)	None	5,078	44–50
95	July 25	Padres	9–2	**Barry Lersch** (2–0)	Dave Roberts (5–8)	None	20,292	45–50
96	July 26	Padres	2–16	Pat Dobson (7–10)	**Rick Wise** (8–8)	None	5,208	45–51
97	July 27	Dodgers	10–3	**Woodie Fryman** (7–6)	Claude Osteen (11–8)	**Dick Selma** (14)	6,017	46–51
98	July 28	Dodgers	2–6	Joe Moeller (5–4)	**Jim Bunning** (8–10)	Jim Brewer (14)	14,000	46–52
–	July 29	Dodgers	Cancelled (rain); Was not rescheduled					
99	July 31 (1)	Giants	3–8	Juan Marichal (5–9)	**Grant Jackson** (2–9)	None	see 2nd game	46–53
100	July 31 (2)	Giants	2–7	Frank Reberger (3–4)	**Chris Short** (5–11)	Don McMahon (11)	15,716	46–54

August (16–16)

#	Date	Opponent	Score	Win	Loss	Save	Attendance	Record
101	August 1 (1)	Giants	6–5 (11)	**Dick Selma** (5–5)	Jerry Johnson (3–2)	None	see 2nd game	47–54
102	August 1 (2)	Giants	6–1	**Rick Wise** (9–8)	Don Carrithers (0–1)	**Barry Lersch** (3)	18,010	48–54
103	August 2	Giants	7–6	**Fred Wenz** (2–0)	Mike Davison (2–4)	None	10,201	49–54
104	August 3	Cardinals	1–4	Mike Torrez (8–9)	**Grant Jackson** (2–10)	None	12,163	49–55
105	August 4	Cardinals	2–3	Jerry Reuss (3–4)	**Chris Short** (5–12)	Chuck Taylor (6)	14,253	49–56
106	August 5	@ Pirates	0–4	Luke Walker (8–3)	**Rick Wise** (9–9)	None	12,915	49–57
107	August 6 (1)	@ Pirates	0–4	Dock Ellis (12–8)	**Jim Bunning** (8–11)	None	see 2nd game	49–58
108	August 6 (2)	@ Pirates	3–8	Bruce Dal Canton (7–1)	**Bill Champion** (0–1)	None	26,664	49–59
109	August 7	Cubs	4–1	**Grant Jackson** (3–10)	Ferguson Jenkins (13–13)	**Dick Selma** (15)	8,123	50–59
110	August 8	Cubs	6–3	**Chris Short** (6–12)	Bill Hands (13–9)	None	10,964	51–59
111	August 9 (1)	Cubs	1–4	Milt Pappas (7–5)	**Rick Wise** (9–10)	Phil Regan (10)	see 2nd game	51–60
112	August 9 (2)	Cubs	6–1	**Barry Lersch** (3–0)	Larry Gura (1–2)	None	19,907	52–60
113	August 11	@ Astros	6–5	**Jim Bunning** (9–11)	Jack Billingham (10–5)	**Dick Selma** (16)	18,184	53–60
114	August 12	@ Astros	0–4	Larry Dierker (11–10)	**Grant Jackson** (3–11)	None	16,677	53–61
115	August 13	@ Astros	3–4	Jim Ray (5–3)	**Dick Selma** (5–6)	Fred Gladding (12)	14,413	53–62
116	August 14	@ Reds	5–4	**Rick Wise** (10–10)	Mel Behney (0–1)	**Joe Hoerner** (9)	31,604	54–62
117	August 15	@ Reds	4–5 (14)	Ray Washburn (2–4)	**Bill Champion** (0–2)	None	42,606	54–63
118	August 16	@ Reds	2–4	Tony Cloninger (6–4)	**Jim Bunning** (9–12)	Wayne Granger (27)	45,059	54–64
119	August 17	@ Reds	3–9	Jim Merritt (18–10)	**Grant Jackson** (3–12)	None	23,255	54–65
120	August 18	@ Braves	2–3	Hoyt Wilhelm (5–3)	**Chris Short** (6–13)	None	9,560	54–66
121	August 19	@ Braves	2–3	Pat Jarvis (14–10)	**Rick Wise** (10–11)	Bob Priddy (7)	8,129	54–67
122	August 20	@ Braves	2–6	Ron Reed (6–5)	**Barry Lersch** (3–1)	None	9,868	54–68
123	August 21 (1)	Astros	9–3	**Jim Bunning** (10–12)	Jack Billingham (10–6)	None	see 2nd game	55–68
124	August 21 (2)	Astros	1–9	Don Wilson (6–5)	**Grant Jackson** (3–13)	None	8,113	55–69
125	August 22	Astros	2–1	**Joe Hoerner** (7–3)	Fred Gladding (4–2)	None	15,276	56–69
126	August 23	Astros	4–0	**Rick Wise** (11–11)	Wade Blasingame (1–1)	**Dick Selma** (17)	3,485	57–69
127	August 25	Reds	3–2 (12)	**Dick Selma** (6–6)	Wayne Granger (6–4)	None	14,508	58–69
128	August 26	Reds	5–6	Jim Merritt (20–10)	**Jim Bunning** (10–13)	Wayne Granger (29)	13,322	58–70
129	August 27	Reds	6–3	**Grant Jackson** (4–13)	Jim McGlothlin (11–8)	None	11,992	59–70
130	August 28	Braves	5–2	**Chris Short** (7–13)	Jim Nash (12–7)	**Dick Selma** (18)	7,908	60–70
131	August 29	Braves	10–9	**Joe Hoerner** (8–3)	Ron Reed (6–6)	**Dick Selma** (19)	9,747	61–70
132	August 30	Braves	4–2	**Barry Lersch** (4–1)	Pat Jarvis (15–11)	**Dick Selma** (20)	9,104	62–70

September (10–18)

#	Date	Opponent	Score	Win	Loss	Save	Attendance	Record
133	September 1	@ Cubs	3–2 (13)	**Woodie Fryman** (8–6)	Phil Regan (4–8)	**Chris Short** (1)	23,992	63–70
134	September 2	@ Cubs	2–17	Milt Pappas (11–6)	**Grant Jackson** (4–14)	Bob Miller (2)	16,234	63–71
135	September 3	@ Cubs	2–7	Ferguson Jenkins (18–14)	**Chris Short** (7–14)	None	10,675	63–72
136	September 4	@ Pirates	3–4^{^{[a]}}	Steve Blass (9–10)	**Rick Wise** (11–12)	John Lamb (1)	22,547	63–73
137	September 5	@ Pirates	4–6	Fred Cambria (1–1)	**Barry Lersch** (4–2)	Dave Giusti (22)	22,925	63–74
138	September 6	@ Pirates	3–4 (10)	Luke Walker (11–6)	**Dick Selma** (6–7)	None	19,049	63–75
139	September 7 (1)	Cardinals	5–1	**Chris Short** (8–14)	Jerry Reuss (5–7)	None	see 2nd game	64–75
140	September 7 (2)	Cardinals	3–2 (13)	**Joe Hoerner** (9–3)	Bob Chlupsa (0–2)	None	14,166	65–75
141	September 8	Cardinals	3–5	Steve Carlton (9–18)	**Rick Wise** (11–13)	None	3,995	65–76
142	September 9 (1)	@ Mets	3–2	**Barry Lersch** (5–2)	Danny Frisella (6–3)	None	see 2nd game	66–76
143	September 9 (2)	@ Mets	1–3	Ray Sadecki (8–4)	**Grant Jackson** (4–15)	None	26,005	66–77
144	September 10	@ Mets	2–3 (14)	Ron Herbel (9–5)	**Joe Hoerner** (9–4)	None	14,307	66–78
145	September 11	@ Expos	0–1	Carl Morton (16–10)	**Chris Short** (8–15)	None	14,637	66–79
146	September 12	@ Expos	3–4	Steve Renko (11–10)	**Lowell Palmer** (1–2)	Howie Reed (5)	25,221	66–80
147	September 13	@ Expos	2–4	John O'Donoghue (3–2)	**Joe Hoerner** (9–5)	None	11,387	66–81
148	September 15	Pirates	3–8	Luke Walker (13–6)	**Barry Lersch** (5–3)	Dave Giusti (24)	4,802	66–82
149	September 16	Pirates	3–5	Bob Moose (11–9)	**Jim Bunning** (10–14)	John Lamb (2)	4,418	66–83
150	September 17	Pirates	3–2	**Chris Short** (9–15)	John Lamb (0–1)	**Dick Selma** (21)	4,199	67–83
151	September 18	@ Cardinals	9–7	**Grant Jackson** (5–15)	Nelson Briles (5–7)	**Dick Selma** (22)	12,385	68–83
152	September 19	@ Cardinals	10–6	**Rick Wise** (12–13)	Frank Bertaina (1–2)	**Fred Wenz** (1)	11,143	69–83
153	September 20	@ Cardinals	7–4 (10)	**Dick Selma** (7–7)	Harry Parker (1–1)	None	14,681	70–83
154	September 22	Mets	6–7	Nolan Ryan (7–10)	**Dick Selma** (7–8)	Dean Chance (5)	5,064	70–84
155	September 23	Mets	4–5	Tug McGraw (4–6)	**Dick Selma** (7–9)	None	5,683	70–85
156	September 25	Cubs	5–3	**Rick Wise** (13–13)	Milt Pappas (12–9)	None	6,108	71–85
157	September 26	Cubs	7–1	**Barry Lersch** (6–3)	Bill Hands (17–15)	None	4,616	72–85
158	September 27	Cubs	3–5	Ferguson Jenkins (21–16)	**Jim Bunning** (10–15)	None	4,377	72–86
159	September 29	Expos	3–10	Steve Renko (13–11)	**Chris Short** (9–16)	Mike Marshall (2)	1,055	72–87
160	September 30	Expos	4–5	Bill Stoneman (7–15)	**Rick Wise** (13–14)	Mike Marshall (3)	1,186	72–88

October (1–0)

#	Date	Opponent	Score	Win	Loss	Save	Attendance	Record
161	October 1	Expos	2–1 (10)	**Dick Selma** (8–9)	Howie Reed (6–5)	None	31,822	73–88

^{^[a]}The September 4 game was suspended in the top of the seventh inning with the score 1–4 and was completed September 5, 1970.

- Phillies win
- Phillies loss
- Postponement
- Bold: Phillies team member

=== Roster ===
1970 Philadelphia Phillies
**Roster**
**Pitchers**: 14 Jim Bunning; 31 Bill Champion; 35 Woodie Fryman; 43 Joe Hoerner; 29 Grant Jackson; 33 Mike Jackson; 45 Bill Laxton; 34 Barry Lersch; 40 Lowell Palmer; 47 Ken Reynolds; 39 Dick Selma; 41 Chris Short; 32 Fred Wenz; 37 Bill Wilson; 38 Rick Wise	**Catchers**: 19 Del Bates; 7 Mike Compton; 5 Doc Edwards; 6 Tim McCarver; 9 Mike Ryan; **Infielders**: 10 Larry Bowa; 15 Denny Doyle; 17 Terry Harmon; 11 Deron Johnson; 42 Greg Luzinski; 16 Don Money; 8 Tony Taylor; 30 John Vukovich	**Outfielders**: 12 Johnny Briggs; 24 Byron Browne; 23 Oscar Gamble; 22 Larry Hisle; 20 Jim Hutto; 18 Rick Joseph; 46 Joe Lis; 33 Willie Montañez; 27 Sam Parrilla; 25 Scott Reid; 21 Ron Stone	**Manager**: 1 Frank Lucchesi; **Coaches**: 3 Billy DeMars; 5 Doc Edwards; 2 George Myatt; 4 Ray Rippelmeyer

== Player stats ==
=== Batting ===
==== Starters by position ====
Note: Pos = Position; G = Games played; AB = At bats; H = Hits; Avg. = Batting average; HR = Home runs; RBI = Runs batted in

Pos	Player	G	AB	H	Avg.	HR	RBI
C	Tim McCarver	44	164	47	.287	4	14
1B	Deron Johnson	159	574	147	.256	27	93
2B	Denny Doyle	112	413	86	.208	2	16
SS	Larry Bowa	145	547	137	.250	0	34
3B	Don Money	120	447	132	.295	14	66
LF	Johnny Briggs	110	341	92	.270	9	47
CF	Larry Hisle	126	405	83	.205	10	44
RF	Byron Browne	104	270	67	.248	10	36

==== Other batters ====
Note: G = Games played; AB = At bats; H = Hits; Avg. = Batting average; HR = Home runs; RBI = Runs batted in

Player	G	AB	H	Avg.	HR	RBI
Tony Taylor	124	439	132	.301	9	55
Ron Stone	123	321	84	.262	3	39
Oscar Gamble	88	275	72	.262	1	19
Mike Ryan	46	134	24	.179	2	11
Terry Harmon	71	129	32	.248	0	7
Rick Joseph	71	119	27	.227	3	10
Mike Compton	47	110	18	.164	1	7
Jim Hutto	57	92	17	.185	3	12
Doc Edwards	35	78	21	.269	0	6
Del Bates	70	60	8	.133	0	1
Scott Reid	25	49	6	.122	0	1
Joe Lis	13	37	7	.189	1	4
Willie Montañez	18	25	6	.240	0	3
Sam Parrilla	11	16	2	.125	0	0
Greg Luzinski	8	12	2	.167	0	0
John Vukovich	3	8	1	.125	0	0

=== Pitching ===
==== Starting pitchers ====
Note: G = Games pitched; IP = Innings pitched; W = Wins; L = Losses; ERA = Earned run average; SO = Strikeouts

Player	G	IP	W	L	ERA	SO
Rick Wise	35	220.1	13	14	4.17	113
Jim Bunning	34	219.0	10	15	4.11	147
Chris Short	36	199.0	9	16	4.30	133
Grant Jackson	32	149.2	5	15	5.29	104
Woodie Fryman	27	127.2	8	6	4.09	97

==== Other pitchers ====
Note: G = Games pitched; IP = Innings pitched; W = Wins; L = Losses; ERA = Earned run average; SO = Strikeouts

Player	G	IP	W	L	ERA	SO
Barry Lersch	42	138.0	6	3	3.26	92
Lowell Palmer	38	102.0	1	2	5.47	85
Bill Champion	7	14.0	0	2	9.00	12

==== Relief pitchers ====
Note: G = Games pitched; W = Wins; L = Losses; SV = Saves; ERA = Earned run average; SO = Strikeouts

Player	G	W	L	SV	ERA	SO
Dick Selma	73	8	9	22	2.75	153
Joe Hoerner	44	9	5	9	2.65	39
Bill Wilson	37	1	0	0	4.78	41
Fred Wenz	22	2	0	1	4.45	24
Mike Jackson	5	1	1	0	1.42	4
Ken Reynolds	4	0	0	0	0.00	1
Bill Laxton	2	0	0	0	13.50	2

== Farm system ==
Level	Team	League	Manager
AAA	Eugene Emeralds	Pacific Coast League	Bob Wellman and Lou Kahn
AA	Reading Phillies	Eastern League	Andy Seminick
A	Peninsula Phillies	Carolina League	Nolan Campbell
A	Spartanburg Phillies	Western Carolinas League	Howie Bedell
A-Short Season	Walla Walla Phillies	Northwest League	Garry Powel
Rookie	Pulaski Phillies	Appalachian League	Brandy Davis
