= 1970 San Francisco Giants season =

1970 San Francisco Giants
- League: National League
- Division: West
- Ballpark: Candlestick Park
- City: San Francisco, California
- Owners: Horace Stoneham
- General managers: Jerry Donovan
- Managers: Clyde King (19–23, to 5/23), Charlie Fox (67–53, from 5/24)
- Television: KTVU (Russ Hodges, Lon Simmons, Bill Thompson)
- Radio: KSFO (Russ Hodges, Lon Simmons, Bill Thompson)

The 1970 San Francisco Giants season was the Giants' 88th year in Major League Baseball, their 13th year in San Francisco since their move from New York following the 1957 season, and their 11th at Candlestick Park. The Giants went 86–76, which was good for third place in the National League West, 16 games behind the NL Champion Cincinnati Reds.

== Offseason ==
- December 1, 1969: 1969 rule 5 draft
  - Mike Sadek was drafted by the Giants from the Minnesota Twins.
  - Hal Haydel was drafted from the Giants by the Minnesota Twins.

== Regular season ==
Clyde King was fired as manager on May 23 after the Giants dropped a 15-inning 17–16 game to the San Diego Padres, slipping them to a 19–23 record and mired in fourth place. The Giants elevated Charlie Fox, manager of their AAA Phoenix (Pacific Coast League) farm team, to manage the big club. The team responded with a double-header sweep of the Padres, 6–1 and 7–6. Fox brought the Giants to a third-place finish with a 67–53 record the rest of the way.

=== Season standings ===
NL West
Team	W	L	Pct.	GB	Home	Road
Cincinnati Reds	102	60	.630	—	57‍–‍24	45‍–‍36
Los Angeles Dodgers	87	74	.540	14½	39‍–‍42	48‍–‍32
San Francisco Giants	86	76	.531	16	48‍–‍33	38‍–‍43
Houston Astros	79	83	.488	23	44‍–‍37	35‍–‍46
Atlanta Braves	76	86	.469	26	42‍–‍39	34‍–‍47
San Diego Padres	63	99	.389	39	31‍–‍50	32‍–‍49

=== Record vs. opponents ===
1970 National League record Sources:
Team	ATL	CHC	CIN	HOU	LAD	MON	NYM	PHI	PIT	SD	SF	STL
Atlanta	—	8–4	5–13	9–9	6–12	6–6	6–6	7–5	6–6	9–9	7–11	7–5
Chicago	4–8	—	7–5	7–5	6–6	13–5	7–11	9–9	8–10	9–3	7–5	7–11
Cincinnati	13–5	5–7	—	15–3	13–5	7–5	8–4	7–5	8–4	8–10	9–9	9–3
Houston	9–9	5–7	3–15	—	8–10	8–4	6–6	4–8	6–6	14–4	10–8	6–6
Los Angeles	12–6	6–6	5–13	10–8	—	8–4	7–5	6–5	6–6	11–7	9–9	7–5
Montreal	6–6	5–13	5–7	4–8	4–8	—	10–8	11–7	9–9	6–6	6–6	7–11
New York	6–6	11–7	4–8	6–6	5–7	8–10	—	13–5	6–12	6–6	6–6	12–6
Philadelphia	5-7	9–9	5–7	8–4	5–6	7–11	5–13	—	4–14	9–3	8–4	8–10
Pittsburgh	6–6	10–8	4–8	6–6	6–6	9–9	12–6	14–4	—	6–6	4–8	12–6
San Diego	9–9	3–9	10–8	4–14	7–11	6–6	6–6	3–9	6–6	—	5–13	4–8
San Francisco	11–7	5–7	9–9	8–10	9–9	6–6	6–6	4–8	8–4	13–5	—	7–5
St. Louis	5–7	11–7	3–9	6–6	5–7	11–7	6–12	10–8	6–12	8–4	5–7	—

=== Opening Day starters ===
- Bobby Bonds
- Dick Dietz
- Tito Fuentes
- Al Gallagher
- Ken Henderson
- Hal Lanier
- Willie Mays
- Willie McCovey
- Gaylord Perry

=== Roster ===
1970 San Francisco Giants
Roster
Pitchers: 26,32 Ron Bryant; 30 Don Carrithers; 40 John Cumberland; 41 Mike Davison; 47 Bill Faul; 35 Jerry Johnson; 49 Jim Johnson; 35 Frank Linzy; 27 Juan Marichal; 40 Mike McCormick; 47 Don McMahon; 36 Gaylord Perry; 38 Skip Pitlock; 41 Miguel Puente; 39 Frank Reberger; 45 Rich Robertson	Catchers: 2 Dick Dietz; 18 Russ Gibson; 5 John Stephenson; Infielders: 19 Bob Burda; 12 Jim Davenport; 23,29 Tito Fuentes; 10 Al Gallagher; 34 Ed Goodson; 16 Jim Ray Hart; 17 Bob Heise; 33 Ron Hunt; 22 Hal Lanier; 21 Don Mason; 44 Willie McCovey	Outfielders: 25 Bobby Bonds; 14 George Foster; 15 Ken Henderson; 37 Frank Johnson; 24 Willie Mays; 31 Bob Taylor; 37 Steve Whitaker; 20 Bernie Williams	Manager: 7 Charlie Fox; 23 Clyde King; Coaches: 12 Jim Davenport; 46 Larry Jansen; 3 Ozzie Virgil; 9 Wes Westrum

== Player stats ==
= Indicates team leader

=== Batting ===
==== Starters by position ====
Note: Pos = Position; G = Games played; AB = At bats; H = Hits; Avg. = Batting average; HR = Home runs; RBI = Runs batted in

Pos	Player	G	AB	H	Avg.	HR	RBI
C	Dick Dietz	148	493	148	.300	22	107
1B	Willie McCovey	152	495	143	.289	39	126
2B	Ron Hunt	117	367	103	.281	6	41
SS	Hal Lanier	134	438	101	.231	2	41
3B	Al Gallagher	109	282	75	.266	4	28
LF	Ken Henderson	148	554	163	.294	17	88
CF	Willie Mays	139	478	139	.291	28	83
RF	Bobby Bonds	157	663	200	.302	26	78

==== Other batters ====
Note: G = Games played; AB = At bats; H = Hits; Avg. = Batting average; HR = Home runs; RBI = Runs batted in

Player	G	AB	H	Avg.	HR	RBI
Tito Fuentes	123	435	116	.267	2	32
Jim Ray Hart	76	255	72	.282	8	37
Frank Johnson	67	161	44	.273	3	31
Bob Heise	67	154	36	.234	1	22
Bob Taylor	63	84	16	.190	2	10
Russ Gibson	24	69	16	.232	0	6
John Stephenson	23	43	3	.070	0	6
Jim Davenport	22	37	9	.243	0	4
Don Mason	46	36	5	.139	0	1
Steve Whitaker	16	27	3	.111	0	4
Bob Burda	28	23	6	.261	0	3
George Foster	9	19	6	.316	1	4
Bernie Williams	7	16	5	.313	0	1
Ed Goodson	7	11	3	.273	0	0

=== Pitching ===
= Indicates league leader

==== Starting pitchers ====
Note: G = Games pitched; IP = Innings pitched; W = Wins; L = Losses; ERA = Earned run average; SO = Strikeouts

Player	G	IP	W	L	ERA	SO
Gaylord Perry	41	328.2	23*	13	3.20	214
Juan Marichal	34	242.2	12	10	4.12	123
Skip Pitlock	18	87.0	5	5	4.66	56

- Tied with Bob Gibson (St Louis) for league lead

==== Other pitchers ====
Note: G = Games pitched; IP = Innings pitched; W = Wins; L = Losses; ERA = Earned run average; SO = Strikeouts

Player	G	IP	W	L	ERA	SO
Rich Robertson	41	183.2	8	9	4.85	121
Frank Reberger	45	152.0	7	8	5.57	117
Ron Bryant	34	96.0	5	8	4.78	66
Mike McCormick	23	78.1	3	4	6.20	37
Don Carrithers	11	22.0	2	1	7.36	14
Miguel Puente	6	18.2	1	3	8.20	14

==== Relief pitchers ====
Note: G = Games pitched; W = Wins; L = Losses; SV = Saves; ERA = Earned run average; SO = Strikeouts

Player	G	W	L	SV	ERA	SO
Don McMahon	61	9	5	19	2.96	74
Jerry Johnson	33	3	4	3	4.27	44
Mike Davison	31	3	5	1	6.50	21
Frank Linzy	20	2	1	1	7.01	16
John Cumberland	7	2	0	0	0.82	6
Bill Faul	7	0	0	1	7.45	6
Jim Johnson	3	1	0	0	8.10	2

== Awards and honors ==
All-Star Game

== Farm system ==
Level	Team	League	Manager
AAA	Phoenix Giants	Pacific Coast League	Charlie Fox, Bob Garibaldi and Hank Sauer
AA	Amarillo Giants	Texas League	Andy Gilbert
A	Fresno Giants	California League	Dennis Sommers
A	Decatur Commodores	Midwest League	Frank Funk
Rookie	Great Falls Giants	Pioneer League	Harvey Koepf
