= 1970 New York Mets season =

1970 New York Mets
- League: National League
- Division: East
- Ballpark: Shea Stadium
- City: New York
- Record: 83–79 (.512)
- Divisional place: 3rd
- Owners: Joan Whitney Payson
- General manager: Bob Scheffing
- Manager: Gil Hodges
- Television: WOR-TV
- Radio: WJRZ/WNBC-FM (Ralph Kiner, Lindsey Nelson, Bob Murphy)

The 1970 New York Mets season was the ninth regular season for the Mets, who played home games at Shea Stadium. Led by manager Gil Hodges, the team had an 83–79 record and finished in third place in the National League East, six games behind the first place Pittsburgh Pirates.

== Offseason ==
- December 3, 1969: Amos Otis and Bob Johnson were traded by the Mets to the Kansas City Royals for Joe Foy.

== Regular season ==
The Mets opened the 1970 season on April 7 with a historic 5–3, 11-inning victory over the Pittsburgh Pirates at Forbes Field. The win marked the first time in franchise history that the Mets won their Opening Day game, snapping an eight-game losing streak in season openers that dated back to the team's inaugural season in 1962.

The game remained tied 3–3 until the top of the 11th inning, when 1969 World Series MVP Donn Clendenon delivered a clutch, two-run single as a pinch-hitter against his former team. Reliever Tug McGraw pitched a scoreless bottom of the frame to secure the victory. The win flipped a long-standing franchise trend; after starting their history 0–8 on Opening Day, the Mets would go on to establish the highest Opening Day winning percentage in Major League Baseball history over the following decades.

=== Season standings ===
NL East
Team	W	L	Pct.	GB	Home	Road
Pittsburgh Pirates	89	73	.549	—	50‍–‍32	39‍–‍41
Chicago Cubs	84	78	.519	5	46‍–‍34	38‍–‍44
New York Mets	83	79	.512	6	44‍–‍38	39‍–‍41
St. Louis Cardinals	76	86	.469	13	34‍–‍47	42‍–‍39
Philadelphia Phillies	73	88	.453	15½	40‍–‍40	33‍–‍48
Montreal Expos	73	89	.451	16	39‍–‍41	34‍–‍48

=== Record vs. opponents ===
1970 National League record Sources:
Team	ATL	CHC	CIN	HOU	LAD	MON	NYM	PHI	PIT	SD	SF	STL
Atlanta	—	8–4	5–13	9–9	6–12	6–6	6–6	7–5	6–6	9–9	7–11	7–5
Chicago	4–8	—	7–5	7–5	6–6	13–5	7–11	9–9	8–10	9–3	7–5	7–11
Cincinnati	13–5	5–7	—	15–3	13–5	7–5	8–4	7–5	8–4	8–10	9–9	9–3
Houston	9–9	5–7	3–15	—	8–10	8–4	6–6	4–8	6–6	14–4	10–8	6–6
Los Angeles	12–6	6–6	5–13	10–8	—	8–4	7–5	6–5	6–6	11–7	9–9	7–5
Montreal	6–6	5–13	5–7	4–8	4–8	—	10–8	11–7	9–9	6–6	6–6	7–11
New York	6–6	11–7	4–8	6–6	5–7	8–10	—	13–5	6–12	6–6	6–6	12–6
Philadelphia	5-7	9–9	5–7	8–4	5–6	7–11	5–13	—	4–14	9–3	8–4	8–10
Pittsburgh	6–6	10–8	4–8	6–6	6–6	9–9	12–6	14–4	—	6–6	4–8	12–6
San Diego	9–9	3–9	10–8	4–14	7–11	6–6	6–6	3–9	6–6	—	5–13	4–8
San Francisco	11–7	5–7	9–9	8–10	9–9	6–6	6–6	4–8	8–4	13–5	—	7–5
St. Louis	5–7	11–7	3–9	6–6	5–7	11–7	6–12	10–8	6–12	8–4	5–7	—

=== Notable transactions ===
- July 12, 1970: Don Cardwell was purchased from the Mets by the Atlanta Braves.

=== Roster ===
1970 New York Mets
Roster
Pitchers: 27 Don Cardwell; 32 Dean Chance; 38 Rich Folkers; 34 Danny Frisella; 39 Gary Gentry; 31 Ron Herbel; 34 Cal Koonce; 36 Jerry Koosman; 43 Jim McAndrew; 45 Tug McGraw; 30 Nolan Ryan; 33 Ray Sadecki; 41 Tom Seaver; 42 Ron Taylor	Catchers: 10 Duffy Dyer; 15 Jerry Grote; Infielders: 12 Ken Boswell; 22 Donn Clendenon; 19 Tim Foli; 5 Joe Foy; 11 Wayne Garrett; 3 Bud Harrelson; 16 Mike Jorgensen; 7 Ed Kranepool; 17 Ted Martínez; 6 Al Weis	Outfielders: 20 Tommie Agee; 17 Rod Gaspar; 21 Cleon Jones; 18 Dave Marshall; 24 Art Shamsky; 29 Ken Singleton; 23 Leroy Stanton; 4 Ron Swoboda	Manager: 14 Gil Hodges; Coaches: 8 Yogi Berra; 52 Joe Pignatano; 54 Rube Walker; 53 Eddie Yost

== Player stats ==
=== Batting ===
==== Starters by position ====
Note: Pos = Position; G = Games played; AB = At bats; H = Hits; Avg. = Batting average; HR = Home runs; RBI = Runs batted in

Pos	Player	G	AB	H	Avg.	HR	RBI
C	Jerry Grote	126	415	106	.255	2	34
1B	Donn Clendenon	121	396	114	.288	22	97
2B	Ken Boswell	105	351	89	.254	5	44
SS	Bud Harrelson	157	564	137	.243	1	42
3B	Joe Foy	99	322	76	.236	6	37
LF	Cleon Jones	134	506	140	.277	10	63
CF	Tommie Agee	153	636	182	.286	24	75
RF	Ron Swoboda	115	245	57	.233	9	40

==== Other batters ====
Note: G = Games played; AB = At bats; H = Hits; Avg. = Batting average; HR = Home runs; RBI = Runs batted in

Player	G	AB	H	Avg.	HR	RBI
Art Shamsky	122	403	118	.293	11	49
Wayne Garrett	114	366	93	.254	12	45
Ken Singleton	69	198	52	.263	5	26
Dave Marshall	92	189	46	.243	6	29
Duffy Dyer	59	148	31	.209	2	12
Al Weis	75	121	25	.207	1	11
Mike Jorgensen	76	87	17	.195	3	4
Ed Kranepool	43	47	8	.170	0	3
Ted Martínez	4	16	1	.063	0	0
Rod Gaspar	11	14	0	.000	0	0
Tim Foli	5	11	4	.364	0	1
Leroy Stanton	4	4	1	.250	0	0

=== Pitching ===
==== Starting pitchers ====
Note: G = Games pitched; IP = Innings pitched; W = Wins; L = Losses; ERA = Earned run average; SO = Strikeouts

Player	G	IP	W	L	ERA	SO
Tom Seaver	37	290.2	18	12	2.82	283
Jerry Koosman	30	212.0	12	7	3.14	118
Gary Gentry	32	188.1	9	9	3.68	134
Jim McAndrew	32	184.1	10	14	3.56	111

==== Other pitchers ====
Note: G = Games pitched; IP = Innings pitched; W = Wins; L = Losses; ERA = Earned run average; SO = Strikeouts

Player	G	IP	W	L	ERA	SO
Ray Sadecki	28	138.2	8	4	3.89	89
Nolan Ryan	27	131.2	7	11	3.42	125

==== Relief pitchers ====
Note: G = Games pitched; W = Wins; L = Losses; SV = Saves; ERA = Earned run average; SO = Strikeouts

Player	G	W	L	SV	ERA	SO
Ron Taylor	57	5	4	13	3.93	28
Tug McGraw	57	4	6	10	3.28	81
Danny Frisella	30	8	3	1	3.02	54
Rich Folkers	16	0	2	2	6.44	15
Don Cardwell	16	0	2	0	6.48	8
Cal Koonce	13	0	2	0	3.27	10
Ron Herbel	12	2	2	1	1.38	8
Dean Chance	3	0	1	1	13.50	0

== Awards and honors ==
- Tommie Agee – Player of the Month, June 1970

All-Star Game

== Farm system ==
Level	Team	League	Manager
AAA	Tidewater Tides	International League	Chuck Hiller
AA	Memphis Blues	Texas League	John Antonelli
A	Visalia Mets	California League	Joe Frazier
A	Pompano Beach Mets	Florida State League	Gordon Mackenzie
Rookie	Marion Mets	Appalachian League	Terry Christman
