= 1970 Chicago Cubs season =

1970 Chicago Cubs
- League: National League
- Division: East
- Ballpark: Wrigley Field
- City: Chicago
- Record: 84–78 (.519)
- Divisional place: 2nd
- Owners: Philip K. Wrigley
- General managers: John Holland
- Managers: Leo Durocher
- Television: WGN-TV (Jack Brickhouse, Lloyd Pettit)
- Radio: WGN (Vince Lloyd, Lou Boudreau)
- Stats: ESPN.com; Baseball Reference

The 1970 Chicago Cubs season was the 99th season of the Chicago Cubs franchise, the 95th in the National League and the 55th at Wrigley Field. The Cubs finished second in the National League East with a record of 84–78 by five games, which was the closest by game margin that the Cubs finished between 1945 and 1984.

== Offseason ==
- November 17, 1969: Oscar Gamble and Dick Selma were traded by the Cubs to the Philadelphia Phillies for Johnny Callison and a player to be named later. The Phillies completed the deal by sending Larry Colton to the Cubs in January 1970.

== March ==
With the trade of Gamble, who was the starting center fielder in late 1969, and Selma, who was the fourth starter in the starting pitching rotation, Manager Leo Durocher had decisions to make about who would play center, who would play right (Callison's natural position, but the Cubs already had a right fielder in Jim Hickman), and who would be the fourth starting pitcher. Durocher decided to make rookie Joe Decker the fourth starter, play Callison in right, and move Hickman to center. Because Hickman was an older, slower player, Durocher decided to spell him late in games with a faster, younger center fielder, Cleo James.

Catcher Randy Hundley was injured in spring training, so the Cubs made a surprising trade in acquiring veteran catcher J.C. Martin from the New York Mets, the Cubs’ biggest rivals.

== April ==
Hundley missed only the season-opening road trip, but was back in the lineup when the team returned to Wrigley Field on April 14. On April 21, however, he suffered an even more serious injury at a play at the plate. Hundley would end up catching only 73 games for the Cubs. This was a serious blow to the Cubs’ season, as Durocher said Hundley "meant at least ten games in the standings."

The Cubs had a great April, standing at 12–3 on April 27, a start so hot it would not be matched by any Cub team until 2020. The team finished the month in first place by 2 1/2 games.

However, rowdy fans throwing garbage on the field and jumping onto it caused the Cubs to make rare mid-season changes to the dimensions of the ballpark by putting a chain-link basket around the top of the outfield walls to keep garbage and fans off the field, and mortaring concrete triangles on the top of the outfield walls so people could not walk on them.

== May ==
The highlight of May was future Hall-of-Fame first baseman Ernie Banks’ 500th home run on May 12. With Hundley out and Martin a below average hitter, the Cubs acquired catcher Jack Hiatt that same day.

May 29 saw the Cubs make another trade that ended up hurting the team when they traded relief pitcher Ted Abernathy to the St. Louis Cardinals for infielder Phil Gagliano. Abernathy would go on to the Kansas City Royals and become one of the top relief pitchers in the American League in 1970 and 1971. Gagliano would hit .150 for the Cubs and be traded before the season ended.

The Cubs ended May in first place by two games over the Mets.

== June ==
A 12-game losing streak, which included losing five straight to the New York Mets in Wrigley Field, knocked the Cubs out of first place. That month also saw a controversy blow up in which Manager Durocher was withholding information from the media and the players, only to reveal it on his evening radio show on WIND-AM. Because of the distraction the show was causing, Durocher gave it up to concentrate on managing.

With Cub bullpen closer Phil Regan faltering, the Cubs on June 23 acquired relief pitcher Roberto Rodriguez. Also on June 23, with Decker having won only one game, the Cubs acquired starting pitcher Milt Pappas to be their fourth starter. Pappas was another player who had had a reputation as a problem player with other clubs.

The team ended the month in third place, 3 1/2 games behind.

== July ==
Needing a left handed reliever, the Cubs acquired Juan Pizarro, yet another player with a reputation for carousing. Hundley finally rejoined the team. On July 29, the Cubs made their biggest move of the year, acquiring Joe Pepitone from the Houston Astros. Pepitone was a starter the rest of the way, usually in center field, with Hickman moving to first base with Banks on the bench, or to right field with Callison on the bench. Pepitone became hugely popular among fans. The Cubs at the end of the month remained in third place, three games behind.

== August ==
August saw a rare three-team pennant race develop among the Cubs, Mets, and Pittsburgh Pirates. A stellar Cub road trip to the West Coast, ending with three victories against the San Diego Padres, ended the month with the Cubs in second place, only one game behind the Pirates.

== September ==
September saw the three teams engage in a classic, tight pennant race. Cub management opened their wallets in an all-out attempt to win it, acquiring relief pitchers Bob Miller and Hoyt Wilhelm and outfielder and former two-time National League batting champion Tommy Davis.

On Sep 3, outfielder Billy Williams did not play after having played in 1,117 consecutive games, then a National League record.

In a pivotal matchup between the Cubs and Pirates on Sep 13, the Cubs were down 2–1 with two outs in the ninth inning. A loss would have put them three games behind and out of the race, but Pirate center fielder Matty Alou dropped a fly ball that would have ended the game, and the Cubs ended up rallying to win.

But in a season in which the Cubs were under .500 on the road, a 14-game road trip that ended the season resulted in enough losses that the Cubs finished second, five games behind the Pirates. The Cubs were only 14–14 for the month, and 4–6 in their last ten games. On the road trip, third baseman Ron Santo played despite having received several death threats.

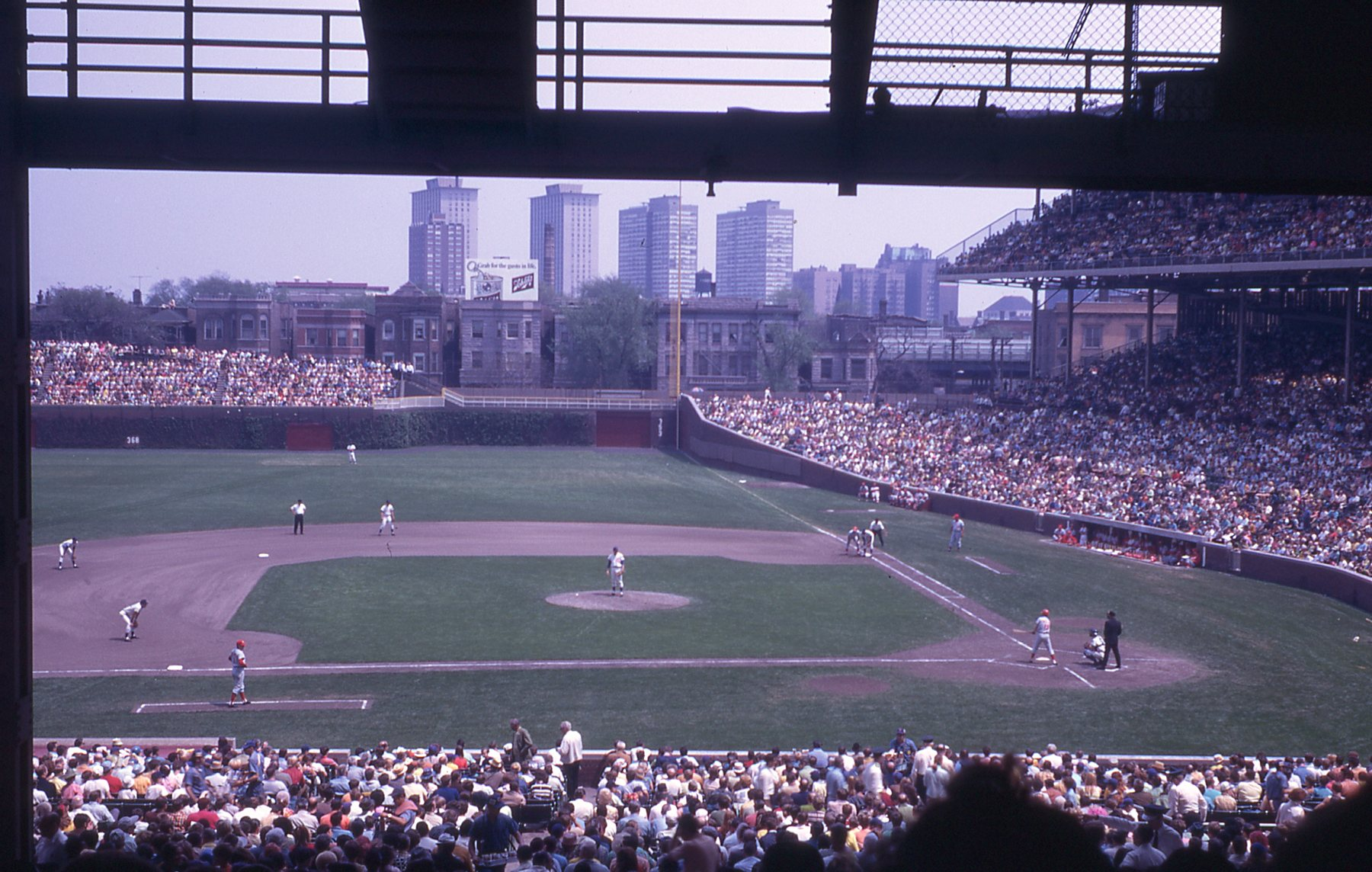
Cubs vs. Reds at Wrigley Field, May 1970

=== Season standings ===
NL East
Team	W	L	Pct.	GB	Home	Road
Pittsburgh Pirates	89	73	.549	—	50‍–‍32	39‍–‍41
Chicago Cubs	84	78	.519	5	46‍–‍34	38‍–‍44
New York Mets	83	79	.512	6	44‍–‍38	39‍–‍41
St. Louis Cardinals	76	86	.469	13	34‍–‍47	42‍–‍39
Philadelphia Phillies	73	88	.453	15½	40‍–‍40	33‍–‍48
Montreal Expos	73	89	.451	16	39‍–‍41	34‍–‍48

=== Record vs. opponents ===
1970 National League record Sources:
Team	ATL	CHC	CIN	HOU	LAD	MON	NYM	PHI	PIT	SD	SF	STL
Atlanta	—	8–4	5–13	9–9	6–12	6–6	6–6	7–5	6–6	9–9	7–11	7–5
Chicago	4–8	—	7–5	7–5	6–6	13–5	7–11	9–9	8–10	9–3	7–5	7–11
Cincinnati	13–5	5–7	—	15–3	13–5	7–5	8–4	7–5	8–4	8–10	9–9	9–3
Houston	9–9	5–7	3–15	—	8–10	8–4	6–6	4–8	6–6	14–4	10–8	6–6
Los Angeles	12–6	6–6	5–13	10–8	—	8–4	7–5	6–5	6–6	11–7	9–9	7–5
Montreal	6–6	5–13	5–7	4–8	4–8	—	10–8	11–7	9–9	6–6	6–6	7–11
New York	6–6	11–7	4–8	6–6	5–7	8–10	—	13–5	6–12	6–6	6–6	12–6
Philadelphia	5-7	9–9	5–7	8–4	5–6	7–11	5–13	—	4–14	9–3	8–4	8–10
Pittsburgh	6–6	10–8	4–8	6–6	6–6	9–9	12–6	14–4	—	6–6	4–8	12–6
San Diego	9–9	3–9	10–8	4–14	7–11	6–6	6–6	3–9	6–6	—	5–13	4–8
San Francisco	11–7	5–7	9–9	8–10	9–9	6–6	6–6	4–8	8–4	13–5	—	7–5
St. Louis	5–7	11–7	3–9	6–6	5–7	11–7	6–12	10–8	6–12	8–4	5–7	—

=== Notable transactions ===
- March 29, 1970: Randy Bobb was traded by the Cubs to the New York Mets for J.C. Martin.
- April 22, 1970: Jim Qualls was traded by the Cubs to the Montreal Expos for Garry Jestadt.
- April 23, 1970: Steve Barber was signed as a free agent by the Cubs.
- May 12, 1970: Jack Hiatt was purchased from the Montreal Expos.
- May 29, 1970: Ted Abernathy was traded by the Cubs to the St. Louis Cardinals for Phil Gagliano.
- June 23, 1970: Don Young was traded by the Cubs to the Oakland Athletics for Roberto Rodriguez.
- June 23, 1970: Milt Pappas was purchased from the Atlanta Braves.
- June 30, 1970: Steve Barber was released by the Cubs.
- July 9, 1970: Archie Reynolds was traded to the California Angels for Juan Pizarro.
- July 29, 1970: Joe Pepitone was purchased by the Cubs from the Houston Astros.
- September 1, 1970: Bob Miller was purchased from the Chicago White Sox.
- September 16, 1970: Tommy Davis was purchased from the Oakland Athletics.
- September 21, 1970: Hoyt Wilhelm was selected off waivers by the Cubs from the Atlanta Braves.

==== Draft picks ====
- June 4, 1970: 1970 Major League Baseball draft
  - Rick Reuschel was drafted by the Cubs in the 3rd round.
  - Jeff Schneider was drafted by the Cubs in the 18th round, but did not sign.

== Roster ==
1970 Chicago Cubs
Roster
Pitchers: 37 Ted Abernathy; 34 Hank Aguirre; 46 Steve Barber; 48 Jim Colborn; 32 Jim Cosman; 36 Joe Decker; 32,34 Jim Dunegan; 40 Larry Gura; 49 Bill Hands; 30 Ken Holtzman; 31 Ferguson Jenkins; 45 Bob Miller; 32 Milt Pappas; 46 Juan Pizarro; 27 Phil Regan; 39 Archie Reynolds; 43 Roberto Rodríguez; 39 Hoyt Wilhelm	Catchers: 21 Jack Hiatt; 9 Randy Hundley; 12 J. C. Martin; 8,15 Ken Rudolph; Infielders: 14 Ernie Banks; 18 Glenn Beckert; 19 Phil Gagliano; 17 Terry Hughes; 11 Don Kessinger; 16 Roger Metzger; 22 Paul Popovich; 10 Ron Santo; 25 Willie Smith	Outfielders: 6 Johnny Callison; 29 Brock Davis; 35 Tommy Davis; 20 Boots Day; 23 Jimmie Hall; 28 Jim Hickman; 24 Cleo James; 8 Joe Pepitone; 20 Al Spangler; 26 Billy Williams; Other batters: 23 Adrian Garrett; 38 Roe Skidmore	Manager: 2 Leo Durocher; Coaches: 5 Joey Amalfitano; 3 Joe Becker; 37 Herman Franks; 7 Peanuts Lowrey; 4 Verlon Walker

== Player stats ==
=== Batting ===
==== Starters by position ====
Note: Pos = Position; G = Games played; AB = At bats; H = Hits; Avg. = Batting average; HR = Home runs; RBI = Runs batted in

Pos	Player	G	AB	H	Avg.	HR	RBI
C	Randy Hundley	73	250	61	.244	7	36
1B	Jim Hickman	149	514	162	.315	32	115
2B	Glenn Beckert	143	591	170	.288	3	36
SS	Don Kessinger	154	631	168	.266	1	39
3B	Ron Santo	154	555	148	.267	26	114
LF	Billy Williams	161	636	205	.322	42	129
CF	Cleo James	100	176	37	.210	3	14
RF	Johnny Callison	147	477	126	.264	19	68

==== Other batters ====
Note: G = Games played; AB = At bats; H = Hits; Avg. = Batting average; HR = Home runs; RBI = Runs batted in

Player	G	AB	H	Avg.	HR	RBI
Ernie Banks	72	222	56	.252	12	44
Joe Pepitone	56	213	57	.268	12	44
Paul Popovich	78	186	47	.253	4	20
Jack Hiatt	66	178	43	.242	2	22
Willie Smith	87	167	36	.216	5	24
J.C. Martin	40	77	12	.156	1	4
Tommy Davis	11	42	11	.262	2	8
Phil Gagliano	26	40	6	.150	0	5
Ken Rudolph	20	40	4	.100	0	2
Jimmie Hall	28	32	3	.094	0	1
Al Spangler	21	14	2	.143	1	1
Boots Day	11	8	2	.250	0	0
Terry Hughes	2	3	1	.333	0	0
Adrian Garrett	3	3	0	.000	0	0
Brock Davis	6	3	0	.000	0	0
Roger Metzger	1	2	0	.000	0	0
Roe Skidmore	1	1	1	1.000	0	0

=== Pitching ===
==== Starting pitchers ====
Note: G = Games pitched; IP = Innings pitched; W = Wins; L = Losses; ERA = Earned run average; SO = Strikeouts

Player	G	IP	W	L	ERA	SO
Ferguson Jenkins	40	313.0	22	16	3.39	274
Ken Holtzman	39	287.2	17	11	3.38	202
Bill Hands	39	265.0	18	15	3.70	170
Milt Pappas	21	144.2	10	8	2.68	80
Joe Decker	24	108.2	2	7	4.64	79

==== Other pitchers ====
Note: G = Games pitched; IP = Innings pitched; W = Wins; L = Losses; ERA = Earned run average; SO = Strikeouts

Player	G	IP	W	L	ERA	SO
Jim Colborn	34	72.2	3	1	3.59	50
Larry Gura	20	38.0	1	3	3.79	21
Archie Reynolds	7	15.0	0	2	6.60	9
Bob Miller	7	9.0	0	0	5.00	4

==== Relief pitchers ====
Note: G = Games pitched; W = Wins; L = Losses; SV = Saves; ERA = Earned run average; SO = Strikeouts

Player	G	W	L	SV	ERA	SO
Phil Regan	54	5	9	12	4.76	31
Roberto Rodriguez	26	3	2	2	5.82	46
Hank Aguirre	17	3	0	1	4.50	11
Juan Pizarro	12	0	0	1	4.60	14
Ted Abernathy	11	0	0	1	2.00	2
Jim Dunegan	7	0	2	0	4.73	3
Steve Barber	5	0	1	0	9.53	3
Hoyt Wilhelm	3	0	1	0	9.82	1
Jim Cosman	1	0	0	0	27.00	0

== Farm system ==
Level	Team	League	Manager
AAA	Tacoma Cubs	Pacific Coast League	Whitey Lockman
AA	San Antonio Missions	Texas League	Jim Marshall
A	Quincy Cubs	Midwest League	Walt Dixon
A-Short Season	Huron Cubs	Northern League	George Freese
Rookie	Caldwell Cubs	Pioneer League	Sparky Davis

LEAGUE CHAMPIONS: Quincy
