= Rich Robertson =

Rich Robertson may refer to:

- Rich Robertson (left-handed pitcher) (born 1968), former Major League Baseball pitcher
- Rich Robertson (right-handed pitcher) (born 1944), former Major League Baseball pitcher

== See also ==
- Ritchie Robertson (born 1952), professor of German
