= Mike Compton (baseball) =

American baseball player (born 1944)

- Catcher
- Born: August 15, 1944 (age 81); Stamford, Texas
- Batted: Right Threw: Right

MLB debut
- April 17, 1970, for the Philadelphia Phillies

Last MLB appearance
- August 30, 1970, for the Philadelphia Phillies

MLB statistics
- Batting average: .165
- Home runs: 1
- Runs batted in: 7
- Stats at Baseball Reference

Teams
- Philadelphia Phillies (1970)

Michael Lynn Compton (born August 15, 1944), is an American former professional baseball catcher, who played in Major League Baseball (MLB) for the Philadelphia Phillies, in 1970.

Compton attended Sul Ross State University. In 1965, he was signed as an amateur free agent, by the Philadelphia Phillies.

On May 2, 1970, Phillies catchers Mike Ryan and Tim McCarver both had a hand broken in the same game, against the San Francisco Giants. With their catching corps depleted, the Phillies had to use Jim Hutto, Del Bates, Doc Edwards, and Compton at the position. Bates and Compton had never played in the Major Leagues before 1970. Edwards, the Phillies’ bullpen coach, had last played in MLB, in 1965.

Compton batted .165, in 110 at bats, with one home run. Before the 1970 season was over, he was demoted to the Triple-A Eugene Emeralds, of the Pacific Coast League. Compton would spend the rest of his professional career playing for the Emeralds.

Compton does hold the distinction of being one of five players to get the only hit off Tom Seaver in Seaver's career of one-hit shutouts before he finally pitched a no-hitter in 1978. On May 15, 1970, he singled in the third inning off Seaver in a 4–0 shutout.

After his playing career was over, Compton managed and coached in the farm systems of the Phillies and Cincinnati Reds. More recently, he has been a minor league catching coordinator and is credited with inventing a ball retrieval tool known as The Ball Hawg.
