= 1970 Pittsburgh Pirates season =

1970 Pittsburgh Pirates
- National League East champions
- League: National League
- Division: East
- Ballpark: Forbes Field (since 1909); Three Rivers Stadium
- City: Pittsburgh, Pennsylvania
- Owners: John W. Galbreath (majority shareholder); Bing Crosby, Thomas P. Johnson (minority shareholders)
- General managers: Joe L. Brown
- Managers: Danny Murtaugh
- Television: KDKA-TV; Bob Prince, Nellie King, Gene Osborn
- Radio: KDKA; Bob Prince, Nellie King, Gene Osborn

The 1970 Pittsburgh Pirates season resulted in the team winning their first National League East title with a record of 89–73, five games ahead of the Chicago Cubs. However, they lost the NLCS to the National League West champion Cincinnati Reds, three games to none.

The Pirates were managed by Danny Murtaugh and played their home games at Forbes Field during the first part of the year, before moving into the brand new Three Rivers Stadium on July 16. Coinciding with their move, the Pirates became the first major league team to adopt pullover jerseys and sans-a-belt pants for their uniforms, a style copied by a majority of MLB for the next two decades and which the Pirates themselves would wear through the 1990 season.

== Offseason ==
=== Three Rivers Stadium ===
In 1958, the Pirates had sold Forbes Field to the University of Pittsburgh, who wanted the land for expanded graduate facilities. Pitt then leased Forbes back to the Pirates until a new multipurpose stadium could be built. The Steelers opted to play at Pitt Stadium in the meantime. In June 1970, the Pirates played their final game at Forbes Field. It was a doubleheader sweep of the Chicago Cubs and Bill Mazeroski got the final hit at Forbes Field.

A site on the North Side had been chosen earlier in the year, but it took until April 25, 1968, to finally break ground. Three Rivers Stadium opened on July 16, 1970, and became the home of the Pirates and the Pittsburgh Steelers.

=== Notable transactions ===
- October 9, 1969: Danny Murtaugh named Manager of the Pirates.
- October 21, 1969: Dave Giusti and Dave Ricketts were traded to the Pirates by the St. Louis Cardinals for Carl Taylor.
- February 4, 1970: Bo Belinsky was traded by the Pirates to the Cincinnati Reds for Dennis Ribant.

== Regular season ==
- June 12, 1970: Dock Ellis threw a no-hitter against the San Diego Padres. Allegedly, Ellis pitched the no-hitter on acid. According to Ellis, in Donald Hall's book, In the Country of Baseball, the Pirates were starting a west-coast road trip. After the Pirates landed in San Diego, Ellis visited his hometown of Los Angeles for a party. Ellis had forgotten he was slated to pitch the next day, so he took some acid the night before the game. At around 10 a.m., after catching maybe an hour of sleep, he realized he was in the wrong place.

=== Season standings ===
NL East
Team	W	L	Pct.	GB	Home	Road
Pittsburgh Pirates	89	73	.549	—	50‍–‍32	39‍–‍41
Chicago Cubs	84	78	.519	5	46‍–‍34	38‍–‍44
New York Mets	83	79	.512	6	44‍–‍38	39‍–‍41
St. Louis Cardinals	76	86	.469	13	34‍–‍47	42‍–‍39
Philadelphia Phillies	73	88	.453	15½	40‍–‍40	33‍–‍48
Montreal Expos	73	89	.451	16	39‍–‍41	34‍–‍48

=== Record vs. opponents ===
1970 National League record Sources:
Team	ATL	CHC	CIN	HOU	LAD	MON	NYM	PHI	PIT	SD	SF	STL
Atlanta	—	8–4	5–13	9–9	6–12	6–6	6–6	7–5	6–6	9–9	7–11	7–5
Chicago	4–8	—	7–5	7–5	6–6	13–5	7–11	9–9	8–10	9–3	7–5	7–11
Cincinnati	13–5	5–7	—	15–3	13–5	7–5	8–4	7–5	8–4	8–10	9–9	9–3
Houston	9–9	5–7	3–15	—	8–10	8–4	6–6	4–8	6–6	14–4	10–8	6–6
Los Angeles	12–6	6–6	5–13	10–8	—	8–4	7–5	6–5	6–6	11–7	9–9	7–5
Montreal	6–6	5–13	5–7	4–8	4–8	—	10–8	11–7	9–9	6–6	6–6	7–11
New York	6–6	11–7	4–8	6–6	5–7	8–10	—	13–5	6–12	6–6	6–6	12–6
Philadelphia	5-7	9–9	5–7	8–4	5–6	7–11	5–13	—	4–14	9–3	8–4	8–10
Pittsburgh	6–6	10–8	4–8	6–6	6–6	9–9	12–6	14–4	—	6–6	4–8	12–6
San Diego	9–9	3–9	10–8	4–14	7–11	6–6	6–6	3–9	6–6	—	5–13	4–8
San Francisco	11–7	5–7	9–9	8–10	9–9	6–6	6–6	4–8	8–4	13–5	—	7–5
St. Louis	5–7	11–7	3–9	6–6	5–7	11–7	6–12	10–8	6–12	8–4	5–7	—

=== Detailed records ===
National League
Opponent	W	L	WP	RS	RA
NL East
Chicago Cubs	10	8	0.556	87	88
Montreal Expos	9	9	0.500	78	68
New York Mets	12	6	0.667	80	72
Philadelphia Phillies	14	4	0.778	68	39
**Pittsburgh Pirates**					
St. Louis Cardinals	12	6	0.667	83	68
Total	57	33	0.633	396	335
NL West
Atlanta Braves	6	6	0.500	69	73
Cincinnati Reds	4	8	0.333	45	57
Houston Astros	6	6	0.500	64	56
Los Angeles Dodgers	6	6	0.500	40	38
San Diego Padres	6	6	0.500	56	43
San Francisco Giants	4	8	0.333	59	62
Total	32	40	0.444	333	329
Season Total	89	73	0.549	729	664

Month	Games	Won	Lost	Win %	RS	RA
April	19	11	8	0.579	73	74
May	30	12	18	0.400	138	154
June	28	17	11	0.607	97	84
July	27	16	11	0.593	138	117
August	29	14	15	0.483	156	132
September	28	18	10	0.643	118	98
October	1	1	0	1.000	9	5
Total	162	89	73	0.549	729	664

	Games	Won	Lost	Win %	RS	RA
Home	82	50	32	0.610	356	315
Away	80	39	41	0.488	373	349
Total	162	89	73	0.549	729	664

=== Game log ===
1970 Game Log: 89–73 (Home: 50–32; Away: 39–41)
April: 11–8 (Home: 7–7; Away: 4–1)

#	Date	Opponent	Score	Win	Loss	Save	Attendance	Record
1	April 7	Mets	3–5 (11)	Taylor	**Hartenstein** (0–1)	McGraw	34,249	0–1
2	April 9	Mets	2–1	**Ellis** (1–0)	Koosman	—	9,884	1–1
3	April 10	@ Phillies	0–2	Fryman	**Veale** (0–1)	—	3,663	1–2
4	April 11	@ Phillies	4–0	**Walker** (1–0)	Jackson	**Hartenstein** (1)	7,673	2–2
5	April 12	@ Phillies	3–1 (10)	**Blass** (1–0)	Bunning	—	22,395	3–2
6	April 14	@ Mets	6–4 (10)	**Hartenstein** (1–1)	McGraw	—	41,679	4–2
7	April 16	@ Mets	7–4	**Dal Canton** (1–0)	Cardwell	—	8,623	5–2
8	April 17	Cardinals	2–5	Culver	**Blass** (1–1)	—	14,369	5–3
9	April 18	Cardinals	1–6	Carlton	**Walker** (1–1)	—	8,465	5–4
10	April 20	Astros	3–1	**Ellis** (2–0)	Bouton	**Giusti** (1)	4,051	6–4
11	April 21	Astros	9–8	**Veale** (1–1)	Dierker	**Gibbon** (1)	3,589	7–4
12	April 22	Astros	6–1	**Blass** (2–1)	Lemaster	—	6,178	8–4
13	April 23	Braves	8–6	**Walker** (2–1)	Jarvis	**Giusti** (2)	4,987	9–4
14	April 24	Braves	0–9	Nash	**Moose** (0–1)	—	5,413	9–5
15	April 25	Braves	8–7	**Giusti** (1–0)	Wilhelm	**McBean** (1)	7,125	10–5
16	April 26	Braves	0–2	Niekro	**Veale** (1–2)	—	15,307	10–6
17	April 27	Cubs	0–1	Decker	**Blass** (2–2)	Regan	6,635	10–7
18	April 28	Cubs	6–1	**Walker** (3–1)	Holtzman	**Giusti** (3)	6,717	11–7
19	April 29	Cubs	5–10	Hands	**Moose** (0–2)	Regan	7,900	11–8

May: 12–18 (Home: 6–5; Away: 6–13)

#	Date	Opponent	Score	Win	Loss	Save	Attendance	Record
20	May 1	@ Reds	4–6	Simpson	**Ellis** (2–1)	Gullett	19,470	11–9
21	May 2	@ Reds	2–7	McGlothlin	**Veale** (1–3)	—	7,721	11–10
22	May 3	@ Reds	7–11	Merritt	**Blass** (2–3)	Carroll	15,219	11–11
23	May 4	@ Braves	3–5	Nash	**Walker** (3–2)	Priddy	7,457	11–12
24	May 5	@ Braves	6–12	Stone	**Moose** (0–3)	Wilhelm	9,199	11–13
25	May 6	@ Braves	0–3	Niekro	**Ellis** (2–2)	—	9,782	11–14
26	May 7	@ Astros	9–5	**Walker** (4–2)	Bouton	**Giusti** (4)	11,678	12–14
27	May 8	@ Astros	5–7	Ray	**Blass** (2–4)	—	13,383	12–15
28	May 9	@ Astros	6–3	**Moose** (1–3)	Griffin	—	15,137	13–15
29	May 10	@ Astros	2–9	Dierker	**Ellis** (2–3)	—	16,768	13–16
30	May 11	Reds	4–1	**Veale** (2–3)	McGlothlin	—	7,722	14–16
31	May 12	Reds	3–5	Merritt	**Blass** (2–5)	—	7,502	14–17
32	May 13	@ Cardinals	5–1	**Moose** (2–3)	Gibson	**Giusti** (5)	12,677	15–17
33	May 14	@ Cardinals	7–11	Johnson	**Garber** (0–1)	—	10,840	15–18
34	May 15	Expos	1–2	McGinn	**Veale** (2–4)	—	7,883	15–19
35	May 16	Expos	4–3	**Walker** (5–2)	Raymond	—	4,237	16–19
36	May 17	Expos	7–8	Strohmayer	**Garber** (0–2)	Raymond	8,604	16–20
37	May 18	Phillies	2–1	**Moose** (3–3)	Bunning	—	5,796	17–20
38	May 19	Phillies	0–2	Short	**Ellis** (2–4)	—	6,251	17–21
39	May 20	Phillies	3–2 (14)	**Dal Canton** (2–0)	Selma	—	5,977	18–21
40	May 21	@ Expos	6–7	Dillman	**Walker** (5–3)	—	13,346	18–22
41	May 22	@ Expos	3–6	Stoneman	**Moose** (3–4)	—	10,576	18–23
42	May 23	@ Expos	8–4	**Ellis** (3–4)	McGinn	**Giusti** (6)	28,702	19–23
43	May 24	@ Expos	3–0	**Veale** (3–4)	Morton	—	29,306	20–23
44	May 26	@ Cubs	3–6	Holtzman	**Blass** (2–6)	—	12,440	20–24
45	May 27	@ Cubs	4–0	**Moose** (4–4)	Jenkins	—	11,002	21–24
46	May 28	@ Cubs	7–8	Colborn	**Garber** (0–3)	—	10,805	21–25
47	May 29	Giants	6–3	**Veale** (4–4)	Robertson	**Giusti** (7)	11,497	22–25
48	May 30	Giants	11–13	Bryant	**Blass** (2–7)	Faul	10,658	22–26
49	May 31	Giants	7–3	**Moose** (5–4)	Marichal	**Giusti** (8)	9,515	23–26

June: 17–11 (Home: 13–4; Away: 4–7)

#	Date	Opponent	Score	Win	Loss	Save	Attendance	Record
50	June 1	Padres	5–1	**Ellis** (4–4)	Coombs	—	5,036	24–26
51	June 2	Padres	8–14	Herbel	**Veale** (4–5)	Dukes	4,747	24–27
52	June 4	Dodgers	0–5	Osteen	**Blass** (2–8)	—	5,423	24–28
53	June 5	Dodgers	3–0	**Moose** (6–4)	Moeller	—	7,691	25–28
54	June 6	Dodgers	7–6 (12)	**Giusti** (2–0)	Pena	—	13,153	26–28
55	June 7	Dodgers	3–1	**Veale** (5–5)	Foster	—	11,243	27–28
56	June 9	@ Giants	5–1	**Blass** (3–8)	Marichal	—	4,250	28–28
57	June 10	@ Giants	2–4	Perry	**Moose** (6–5)	—	3,732	28–29
58	June 12	@ Padres	2–0	**Ellis** (5–4)	Roberts	—		29–29
59	June 12	@ Padres	2–5	Coombs	**Veale** (5–6)	—	9,903	29–30
60	June 13	@ Padres	7–2	**Blass** (4–8)	Santorini	—	7,105	30–30
61	June 14	@ Padres	1–2	Kirby	**Moose** (6–6)	—	15,781	30–31
62	June 15	@ Dodgers	5–2	**Nelson** (1–0)	Moeller	**Giusti** (9)	14,490	31–31
63	June 16	@ Dodgers	0–1	Sutton	**Veale** (5–7)	—	20,069	31–32
64	June 17	@ Dodgers	0–4	Osteen	**Ellis** (5–5)	—	17,327	31–33
65	June 19	Expos	8–4	**Dal Canton** (3–0)	Dillman	**Walker** (1)	9,707	32–33
66	June 20	Expos	4–2	**Blass** (5–8)	Morton	**Giusti** (10)	5,148	33–33
67	June 21	Expos	2–3	Nye	**Veale** (5–8)	—	12,325	33–34
68	June 22	Cardinals	1–6	Reuss	**Ellis** (5–6)	—		33–35
69	June 22	Cardinals	1–0 (10)	**Nelson** (2–0)	Linzy	—	15,158	34–35
70	June 23	Cardinals	7–2	**Moose** (7–6)	Taylor	—	7,654	35–35
71	June 24	Cardinals	4–3 (11)	**Walker** (6–3)	McCool	—	8,095	36–35
72	June 25	Cardinals	3–2	**Giusti** (3–0)	Carlton	—	9,910	37–35
73	June 27	Cubs	2–1	**Ellis** (6–6)	Jenkins	—	10,188	38–35
74	June 28	Cubs	3–2	**Giusti** (4–0)	Hands	**Walker** (2)		39–35
75	June 28	Cubs	4–1	**Nelson** (3–0)	Pappas	**Giusti** (11)	40,918	40–35
76	June 29	@ Mets	2–3	Seaver	**Blass** (5–9)	—	42,416	40–36
77	June 30	@ Mets	6–7	Koosman	**Veale** (5–9)	Taylor	38,681	40–37

July: 16–11 (Home: 5–4; Away: 11–7)

#	Date	Opponent	Score	Win	Loss	Save	Attendance	Record
78	July 1	@ Mets	4–3	**Ellis** (7–6)	McAndrew	**Giusti** (12)	34,316	41–37
79	July 3	@ Cubs	16–14	**Giusti** (5–0)	Regan	—	26,602	42–37
80	July 4	@ Cubs	10–6	**Blass** (6–9)	Holtzman	**Walker** (3)		43–37
81	July 4	@ Cubs	2–7	Pappas	**Veale** (5–10)	Gura	26,634	43–38
82	July 5	@ Cubs	5–2	**Ellis** (8–6)	Jenkins	—	25,569	44–38
83	July 6	@ Phillies	7–5	**Nelson** (4–0)	Bunning	**Giusti** (13)	6,145	45–38
84	July 7	@ Phillies	4–2	**Veale** (6–10)	Short	**Giusti** (14)	6,938	46–38
85	July 8	@ Phillies	0–2	Wise	**Blass** (6–10)	—	7,038	46–39
86	July 9	@ Cardinals	6–0	**Ellis** (9–6)	Carlton	—	22,345	47–39
87	July 10	@ Cardinals	6–2	**Giusti** (6–0)	Gibson	—	23,920	48–39
88	July 11	@ Cardinals	8–7	**Dal Canton** (4–0)	Taylor	**Pena** (1)	25,686	49–39
89	July 12	@ Cardinals	7–6 (10)	**Giusti** (7–0)	Hrabosky	**Dal Canton** (1)	45,776	50–39
90	July 16	Reds	2–3	Carroll	**Ellis** (9–7)	—	48,846	50–40
91	July 17	Reds	4–3	**Giusti** (8–0)	Simpson	—	23,298	51–40
92	July 18	Reds	1–3 (10)	Merritt	**Giusti** (8–1)	Granger	27,906	51–41
93	July 19	Reds	7–3	**Walker** (7–3)	Gullett	**Gibbon** (2)	32,294	52–41
94	July 20	@ Astros	4–5 (12)	Cook	**Dal Canton** (4–1)	—	17,934	52–42
95	July 21	@ Astros	1–3	Wilson	**Nelson** (4–1)	Cook	17,741	52–43
96	July 22	Braves	5–3	**Dal Canton** (5–1)	Stone	**Giusti** (15)	19,145	53–43
97	July 23	Braves	6–5	**Colpaert** (1–0)	McQueen	**Giusti** (16)	14,377	54–43
98	July 24	Astros	11–0	**Ellis** (10–7)	Griffin	—	43,290	55–43
99	July 25	Astros	4–8	Cook	**Veale** (6–11)	Dierker	14,069	55–44
100	July 26	Astros	4–6 (10)	Lemaster	**Giusti** (8–2)	Gladding	40,131	55–45
101	July 28	@ Reds	4–3	**Dal Canton** (6–1)	McGlothlin	**Giusti** (17)	25,807	56–45
102	July 29	@ Reds	3–4	Nolan	**Ellis** (10–8)	Granger	25,788	56–46
103	July 30	@ Reds	4–8	Cloninger	**Veale** (6–12)	Gullett	26,298	56–47
104	July 31	@ Braves	3–4	Jarvis	**Nelson** (4–2)	Wilhelm	12,196	56–48

August: 14–15 (Home: 9–7; Away: 5–8)

#	Date	Opponent	Score	Win	Loss	Save	Attendance	Record
105	August 1	@ Braves	20–10	**Pena** (1–0)	Stone	**Giusti** (18)	28,333	57–48
106	August 2	@ Braves	10–7	**Ellis** (11–8)	Nash	**Giusti** (19)	15,227	58–48
107	August 3	@ Expos	0–8	McGinn	**Moose** (7–7)	—	18,110	58–49
108	August 4	@ Expos	4–2	**Veale** (7–12)	Marshall	—	27,112	59–49
109	August 5	Phillies	4–0	**Walker** (8–3)	Wise	—	12,915	60–49
110	August 6	Phillies	4–0	**Ellis** (12–8)	Bunning	—		61–49
111	August 6	Phillies	8–3	**Dal Canton** (7–1)	Champion	—	26,664	62–49
112	August 7	Mets	6–1	**Moose** (8–7)	McAndrew	—	37,556	63–49
113	August 8	Mets	9–12	Koosman	**Veale** (7–13)	Gentry	27,843	63–50
114	August 9	Mets	8–3	**Walker** (9–3)	Ryan	**Pena** (2)	41,772	64–50
115	August 10	Mets	2–10	Seaver	**Ellis** (12–9)	—	47,148	64–51
116	August 11	Dodgers	4–5	Osteen	**Dal Canton** (7–2)	Brewer	16,708	64–52
117	August 12	Dodgers	4–11	Mikkelsen	**Moose** (8–8)	Hough	34,551	64–53
118	August 14	Padres	2–1	**Pena** (2–0)	Roberts	—		65–53
119	August 14	Padres	10–1	**Walker** (10–3)	Dobson	—	26,979	66–53
120	August 15	Padres	9–3	**Veale** (8–13)	Wilson	—	14,110	67–53
121	August 16	Padres	6–8	Herbel	**Pena** (2–1)	Dukes	18,969	67–54
122	August 17	Giants	4–5	Perry	**Dal Canton** (7–3)	—	21,148	67–55
123	August 18	Giants	6–2	**Blass** (7–10)	Pitlock	**Giusti** (20)	25,325	68–55
124	August 19	Giants	4–7	Marichal	**Walker** (10–4)	—	24,655	68–56
125	August 21	@ Dodgers	1–2	Osteen	**Veale** (8–14)	—	24,372	68–57
126	August 22	@ Dodgers	2–1 (16)	**Dal Canton** (8–3)	Mikkelsen	—	39,829	69–57
127	August 23	@ Dodgers	11–0	**Blass** (8–10)	Foster	—	20,678	70–57
128	August 25	@ Padres	3–4	Dukes	**Walker** (10–5)	—	4,876	70–58
129	August 26	@ Padres	1–2	Dobson	**Cambria** (0–1)	Dukes	6,067	70–59
130	August 28	@ Giants	1–5	Marichal	**Moose** (8–9)	—	6,174	70–60
131	August 29	@ Giants	9–10 (10)	McMahon	**Dal Canton** (8–4)	—	8,188	70–61
132	August 30	@ Giants	3–7	Johnson	**Walker** (10–6)	Robertson		70–62
133	August 30	@ Giants	1–2	Bryant	**Giusti** (8–3)	—	15,963	70–63

September: 18–10 (Home: 10–5; Away: 8–5)

#	Date	Opponent	Score	Win	Loss	Save	Attendance	Record
134	September 1	@ Expos	8–4	**Veale** (9–14)	Stoneman	**Giusti** (21)	20,123	71–63
135	September 2	@ Expos	7–10	Marshall	**Gibbon** (0–1)	—	15,461	71–64
136	September 4	Phillies	4–3	**Blass** (9–10)	Wise	**Lamb** (1)	22,547	72–64
137	September 5	Phillies	6–4	**Cambria** (1–1)	Lersch	**Giusti** (22)	22,925	73–64
138	September 6	Phillies	4–3 (10)	**Walker** (11–6)	Selma	—	19,049	74–64
139	September 7	Cubs	8–3	**Moose** (9–9)	Pappas	—		75–64
140	September 7	Cubs	2–9	Jenkins	**Veale** (9–15)	—	42,556	75–65
141	September 8	Cubs	3–10	Hands	**Blass** (9–11)	—	6,777	75–66
142	September 9	Cardinals	4–6	Bertaina	**Cambria** (1–2)	Hilgendorf	14,927	75–67
143	September 10	Cardinals	2–0	**Walker** (12–6)	Briles	—	14,386	76–67
144	September 12	@ Cubs	5–4	**Moose** (10–9)	Jenkins	**Giusti** (23)	33,199	77–67
145	September 13	@ Cubs	2–3	Hands	**Blass** (9–12)	—	22,567	77–68
146	September 15	@ Phillies	8–3	**Walker** (13–6)	Lersch	**Giusti** (24)	4,802	78–68
147	September 16	@ Phillies	5–3	**Moose** (11–9)	Bunning	**Lamb** (2)	4,418	79–68
148	September 17	@ Phillies	2–3	Short	**Lamb** (0–1)	Selma	4,199	79–69
149	September 18	@ Mets	3–2	**Blass** (10–12)	McAndrew	**Giusti** (25)	42,225	80–69
150	September 19	@ Mets	2–1	**Walker** (14–6)	Gentry	**Gibbon** (3)	41,323	81–69
151	September 20	@ Mets	1–4	Koosman	**Moose** (11–10)	—		81–70
152	September 20	@ Mets	9–5 (10)	**Giusti** (9–3)	McGraw	—	54,806	82–70
153	September 22	Expos	0–1	Stoneman	**Ellis** (12–10)	—		82–71
154	September 22	Expos	3–1	**Veale** (10–15)	Wegener	**Gibbon** (4)	19,524	83–71
155	September 23	Expos	2–3	Morton	**Brunet** (0–1)	Marshall	12,420	83–72
156	September 24	Expos	8–0	**Walker** (15–6)	Renko	—	14,026	84–72
157	September 25	Mets	4–3	**Grant** (1–0)	Chance	**Gibbon** (5)	41,484	85–72
158	September 26	Mets	4–3	**Grant** (2–0)	Herbel	—	34,311	86–72
159	September 27	Mets	2–1	**Ellis** (13–10)	McAndrew	**Giusti** (26)	50,469	87–72
160	September 29	@ Cardinals	7–2	**Dal Canton** (9–4)	Gibson	**Lamb** (3)	13,232	88–72
161	September 30	@ Cardinals	3–4	Briles	**Grant** (2–1)	—	8,084	88–73

October: 1–0 (Home: 0–0; Away: 1–0)

#	Date	Opponent	Score	Win	Loss	Save	Attendance	Record
162	October 1	@ Cardinals	9–5	**Brunet** (1–1)	Cleveland	**Acosta** (1)	8,457	89–73

Legend: = Win = Loss
Bold = Pirates team member

=== Opening Day lineup ===
Opening Day Starters
#	Name	Position
18	Matty Alou	CF
20	Richie Hebner	3B
21	Roberto Clemente	RF
8	Willie Stargell	LF
16	Al Oliver	1B
14	Gene Alley	SS
12	Jerry May	C
9	Bill Mazeroski	2B
28	Steve Blass	SP

=== Notable transactions ===
- April 24, 1970: Al McBean was signed by the Pirates.
- May 18, 1970: Al McBean was released by the Pirates.
- June 4, 1970: 1970 Major League Baseball draft
  - Dave Parker was drafted by the Pirates in the 14th round of the 1970 Major League Baseball draft.
  - Ed Ott was drafted by the Pirates in the 23rd round of the 1970 Major League Baseball draft.
- June 9, 1970: Orlando Peña was signed by the Pirates.
- June 22, 1970: Chuck Hartenstein was selected off waivers from the Pirates by the St. Louis Cardinals.
- August 26, 1970: Orlando Pena was released by the Pirates.
- August 31, 1970: George Brunet was traded to the Pirates by the Washington Senators for Denny Riddleberger.
- September 14, 1970: Dave Ricketts was released by the Pirates.
- September 14, 1970: Mudcat Grant was traded to the Pirates by the Oakland Athletics for Angel Mangual.

=== Roster ===
1970 Pittsburgh Pirates
**Roster**
**Pitchers**: 17,46 Ed Acosta; 28 Steve Blass; 22 George Brunet; 36 Fred Cambria; 36 Dick Colpaert; 27 Bruce Dal Canton; 17 Dock Ellis; 36 Gene Garber; 19 Joe Gibbon; 31 Dave Giusti; 47 Mudcat Grant; 22 Chuck Hartenstein; 24 John Lamb; 29 Lou Marone; 34 Al McBean; 38 Bob Moose; 24 Jim Nelson; 22,46 Orlando Peña; 39 Bob Veale; 23 Luke Walker	**Catchers**: 12 Jerry May; 5 Dave Ricketts; 35 Manny Sanguillén; **Infielders**: 14 Gene Alley; 10,30 Dave Cash; 10,20 Richie Hebner; 6,10 George Kopacz; 15 José Martínez; 9 Bill Mazeroski; 11 José Pagán; 2 Freddie Patek; 6,7 Bob Robertson	**Outfielders**: 18 Matty Alou; 21 Roberto Clemente; 15 Gene Clines; 25 Johnny Jeter; 16 Al Oliver; 8 Willie Stargell; **Other batters**: 29 Milt May	**Manager**: 40 Danny Murtaugh; **Coaches**: 43 Don Leppert; 44 Frank Oceak; 42 Don Osborn; 41 Bill Virdon

== Postseason ==
=== National League Championship Series ===
The Cincinnati Reds won the series, three games to none, over the Pirates.

Game	Score	Date	Location	Attendance
1	Cincinnati – 3, Pittsburgh – 0	October 3	Three Rivers Stadium	33,088
2	Cincinnati – 3, Pittsburgh – 1	October 4	Three Rivers Stadium	39,317
3	Pittsburgh – 2, Cincinnati – 3	October 5	Riverfront Stadium	40,538

== Statistics ==
Batting

Note: G = Games played; AB = At bats; H = Hits; Avg. = Batting average; HR = Home runs; RBI = Runs batted in

Regular Season
Player	G	AB	H	Avg.	HR	RBI
Gene Garber	14	3	2	0.667	0	0
Milt May	5	4	2	0.500	0	2
Gene Clines	31	37	15	0.405	0	3
Roberto Clemente	108	412	145	0.352	14	60
Manny Sanguillen	128	486	158	0.325	7	61
Dave Cash	64	210	66	0.314	1	28
Matty Alou	155	677	201	0.297	1	47
Richie Hebner	120	420	122	0.290	11	46
Bob Robertson	117	390	112	0.287	27	82
Al Oliver	151	551	149	0.270	12	83
Jose Pagan	95	230	61	0.265	7	29
Willie Stargell	136	474	125	0.264	31	85
Freddie Patek	84	237	58	0.245	1	19
Gene Alley	121	426	104	0.244	8	41
Johnny Jeter	85	126	30	0.238	2	12
Bill Mazeroski	112	367	84	0.229	7	39
Jerry May	51	139	29	0.209	1	16
Fred Cambria	6	10	2	0.200	0	1
Jim Nelson	15	20	4	0.200	0	3
Dave Giusti	66	16	3	0.188	0	3
George Kopacz	10	16	3	0.188	0	0
Bob Moose	29	66	12	0.182	0	2
Dave Ricketts	14	11	2	0.182	0	0
Bob Veale	34	67	11	0.164	0	6
Luke Walker	42	46	6	0.130	0	5
Steve Blass	32	70	8	0.114	0	2
Dock Ellis	38	70	7	0.100	0	1
Jose Martinez	19	20	1	0.050	0	0
George Brunet	12	4	0	0.000	0	0
Bruce Dal Canton	41	16	0	0.000	0	0
Joe Gibbon	41	3	0	0.000	0	0
Mudcat Grant	8	2	0	0.000	0	0
Chuck Hartenstein	17	1	0	0.000	0	0
John Lamb	23	3	0	0.000	0	0
Al McBean	7	1	0	0.000	0	0
Orlando Pena	23	6	0	0.000	0	0
Ed Acosta	3	0	0	—	0	0
Dick Colpaert	8	0	0	—	0	0
Lou Marone	1	0	0	—	0	0
Team totals	162	5,637	1,522	0.270	130	676

Postseason
Player	G	AB	H	Avg.	HR	RBI
Richie Hebner	2	6	4	0.667	0	0
Willie Stargell	3	12	6	0.500	0	1
Jose Pagan	1	3	1	0.333	0	0
Matty Alou	3	12	3	0.250	0	0
Al Oliver	2	8	2	0.250	0	1
Roberto Clemente	3	14	3	0.214	0	1
Bob Robertson	2	5	1	0.200	0	0
Manny Sanguillen	3	12	2	0.167	0	0
Dave Cash	2	8	1	0.125	0	0
Gene Alley	2	7	0	0.000	0	0
Dock Ellis	1	2	0	0.000	0	0
Johnny Jeter	3	2	0	0.000	0	0
Bill Mazeroski	1	2	0	0.000	0	0
Bob Moose	1	4	0	0.000	0	0
Freddie Patek	1	3	0	0.000	0	0
Luke Walker	1	2	0	0.000	0	0
Joe Gibbon	2	0	0	—	0	0
Dave Giusti	2	0	0	—	0	0
Team totals	3	102	23	0.225	0	3

Pitching

Note: G = Games pitched; IP = Innings pitched; W = Wins; L = Losses; ERA = Earned run average; SO = Strikeouts

Regular Season
Player	G	IP	W	L	ERA	SO
Mudcat Grant	8	12	2	1	2.25	4
George Brunet	12	16 2/3	1	1	2.70	17
John Lamb	23	32 1/3	0	1	2.78	24
Luke Walker	42	163	15	6	3.04	124
Dave Giusti	66	103	9	3	3.06	85
Dock Ellis	30	201 2/3	13	10	3.21	128
Jim Nelson	15	68 1/3	4	2	3.42	42
Fred Cambria	6	33 1/3	1	2	3.51	14
Steve Blass	31	196 2/3	10	12	3.52	120
Lou Marone	1	2 1/3	0	0	3.86	0
Bob Veale	34	202	10	15	3.92	178
Bob Moose	28	189 2/3	11	10	3.99	119
Chuck Hartenstein	17	23 2/3	1	1	4.56	14
Bruce Dal Canton	41	84 2/3	9	4	4.57	53
Orlando Pena	23	37 2/3	2	1	4.78	25
Joe Gibbon	41	41	0	1	4.83	26
Gene Garber	14	22 1/3	0	3	5.24	7
Dick Colpaert	8	10 2/3	1	0	5.91	6
Al McBean	7	10	0	0	8.10	3
Ed Acosta	3	2 2/3	0	0	13.50	1
Team totals	162	1,453 2/3	89	73	3.70	990

Postseason
Player	G	IP	W	L	ERA	SO
Joe Gibbon	2	1/3	0	0	0.00	1
Luke Walker	1	7	0	1	1.29	5
Dock Ellis	1	9 2/3	0	1	2.79	1
Bob Moose	1	7 2/3	0	1	3.52	4
Dave Giusti	2	2 1/3	0	0	3.86	1
Team totals	3	27	0	3	2.67	12

== Awards and honors ==
- Danny Murtaugh, Associated Press NL Manager of the Year

1970 Major League Baseball All-Star Game

== Farm system ==
Level	Team	League	Manager
AAA	Columbus Jets	International League	Joe Morgan
AA	Waterbury Pirates	Eastern League	Red Davis
A	Salem Rebels	Carolina League	Billy Klaus
A	Gastonia Pirates	Western Carolinas League	Ed Hobaugh
A-Short Season	Niagara Falls Pirates	New York–Penn League	Irv Noren
Rookie	GCL Pirates	Gulf Coast League	Dick Cole
Rookie	GCL Tourists	Gulf Coast League	Ed Napoleon

LEAGUE CHAMPIONS: Waterbury
