= Mike Compton =

Mike Compton may refer to:

- Mike Compton (baseball) (born 1944), played for the Philadelphia Phillies (catcher)
- Mike Compton (American football) (born 1970), NFL guard
- Mike Compton (musician) (born 1956), American bluegrass mandolin player
