= Pompano Beach Cubs =

- 1976–1978; Pompano Beach, Florida

Minor league affiliations
- Class: Class A (1976–1978)
- League: Florida State League (1976–1978)

Major league affiliations
- Team: Chicago Cubs (1976–1978)

Team data
- Name: Pompano Beach Cubs (1976–1978)
- Ballpark: Pompano Beach Municipal Stadium (1976–1978)

The Pompano Beach Cubs were a minor league baseball team located in Pompano Beach, Florida. The team played in the Florida State League and home stadium was Pompano Beach Municipal Park.

== Notable alumni ==
- Lee Smith (1976-1977) Inducted Baseball Hall of Fame, 2019
- Ron Davis (1976) MLB All-Star
- Jim Tracy (1977-1978) 2009 NL Manager of the Year
