= Pompano Beach Municipal Stadium =

Stadium in Florida, United States

- Interactive map of Pompano Beach Municipal Stadium
- Location: NE 8th St & NE 18th Ave; Pompano Beach, Florida 33060
- Coordinates: 26.239713°N 80.107265°W
- Owner: City of Pompano Beach
- Capacity: 4,500
- Surface: Grass
- Field size: Left – 350ft. Center – 420ft. Right – 350ft.

Construction
- Opened: March 22, 1957
- Demolished: 2008
- Cost: $

Tenants
- Washington Senators (AL) (1961–1971) (spring training); Pompano Beach Mets (FSL) (1969–1973); Texas Rangers (AL) (1972–1986) (spring training); Pompano Beach Cubs (FSL) (1976-78); Gold Coast Suns (SPBA) (1989); Miami Miracle (FSL) (1990–1991); Fort Lauderdale Strikers (APSL) (1990)

Pompano Beach Municipal Stadium was a stadium in Pompano Beach, Florida primarily used for professional and amateur baseball from 1957 until its demolition in 2008. The ballpark was dedicated on March 22, 1957, and held 4,500 people. The stadium was the spring training home of the Washington Senators/Texas Rangers franchise from 1961 until 1986, multiple minor league clubs, and the Pompano Beach High School baseball team.

== Spring training and minor league baseball ==
It served as the spring training home of the Washington Senators/Texas Rangers from 1961 through 1986.

The stadium was home to multiple minor league teams including the Florida State League Pompano Beach Mets and Pompano Beach Cubs, as well as the Miami Miracle in 1990 and 1991. The 1989 Senior Professional Baseball Association Gold Coast Suns split their home games between Bobby Maduro-Miami Stadium and Municipal Stadium.

The Fort Lauderdale Strikers of the APSL used it as their home field in 1990 after the Broward School District via the school board, denied the team access to Lockhart Stadium.

== Improvements ==
In 1980 new night lighting, seat and fences were installed at a cost of $227,000. Improvements in 1984 included a new practice infield, public address system, re-carpeting of the clubhouse and rewiring of the concession stands.

== Current use ==
The stadium was demolished in 2008 and the land repurposed into multiple baseball fields. The baseball complex is managed by the City of Pompano Beach and hosts Federal League Semi-Pro Baseball, high school, and other amateur baseball games.
