= George Kopacz =

American baseball player (born 1941)

- First baseman
- Born: February 26, 1941 (age 84); Chicago, Illinois, U.S.
- Batted: Left Threw: Left

MLB debut
- September 18, 1966, for the Atlanta Braves

Last MLB appearance
- September 29, 1970, for the Pittsburgh Pirates

MLB statistics
- Batting average: .120
- Home runs: 0
- Runs batted in: 0
- Stats at Baseball Reference

Teams
- Atlanta Braves (1966); Pittsburgh Pirates (1970)

George Felix Kopacz (born February 26, 1941) is an American former first baseman in Major League Baseball who played for the Atlanta Braves (1966) and the Pittsburgh Pirates (1970). Listed at 6 ft 1 in (1.85 m) and 195 lb (88 kg), Kopacz batted and threw left-handed.

In his two MLB trials, Kopacz was a .120 hitter (3-for-25) with one run scored in 16 games. He did not have any extra base hits and did not drive in a run. However, he played 14 seasons (1960–1973) of minor league baseball and in 1970 he was the Most Valuable Player of the Triple-A International League, with a batting average of .310, 29 home runs and 115 RBI.

== See also ==
- 1966 Atlanta Braves season
- 1970 Pittsburgh Pirates season
