= Gulf Coast League Tourists =

- (1970); Bradenton, Florida

Minor league affiliations
- Previous classes: Class Rookie League
- Previous leagues: Gulf Coast League

Major league affiliations
- Previous teams: Pittsburgh Pirates

Team data
- Name: GCL Tourists
- Ballpark: Traveling team
- Owner/ Operator: Pittsburgh Pirates
- Manager: Ed Napoleon

The Gulf Coast League Tourists or GCL Tourists were a minor league baseball club, that was an affiliate of the Pittsburgh Pirates during the 1970 season.

The team played in the rookie-level Gulf Coast League. The Tourists were the second Pirates' affiliate in the league, playing alongside the Gulf Coast League Pirates. The team's Tourists moniker was derived from the fact that they did not have a home field, only serving as a road club. The Tourists folded after their lone season.

== Legacy ==
Although the Gulf Coast League Tourists existed for only one season, they served as a developmental affiliate for the Pittsburgh Pirates, contributing to the early careers of several players within the organization. The team's brief tenure reflects the fluid nature of minor league affiliations and naming conventions during the era. Pirate City, their home ballpark, continues to be used by the Pittsburgh Pirates for spring training and minor league development.

== 1970 season ==
Year	Record	W-L%	Finish	Manager	Playoffs
1970	26-36	.413	7th GCL	Ed Napoleon	Did not qualify
