= Gold Coast Suns (baseball) =

- 1989

Minor league affiliations
- Class: Independent Winter League
- League: Senior Professional Baseball Association
- Division: Southern Division

Team data
- Ballpark: Bobby Maduro-Miami Stadium; Pompano Beach Municipal Park

The Gold Coast Suns was one of the eight original franchises that played in the Senior Professional Baseball Association in its inaugural 1989 season. The club split their home games between the cities of Miami and Pompano Beach in Florida.

Earl Weaver managed the Suns, who hired former All-Star Pedro Ramos as their pitching coach. Bright spots included pitcher Joaquín Andújar, who posted a 5–0 record with a 1.31 earned run average, and shortstop Bert Campaneris as the oldest everyday player in the league at 47, who hit a .291 batting average and stole 16 bases in 60 games.

But the Suns struggled for most of the season, ending with a 32–39 record and out of the playoffs. Without a fan base, the team averaged 985 fans per game, about half of the attendance projected, and folded at the end of the season.

== Notable players ==
- Joaquín Andújar
- Stan Bahnsen
- Paul Blair
- Bert Campaneris
- Paul Casanova
- César Cedeño
- Ken Clay
- Mike Cuellar
- Jesús de la Rosa
- Joe Decker
- Taylor Duncan
- Jim Essian
- Ed Figueroa
- Jim Gideon
- Orlando González
- Ross Grimsley
- Glenn Gulliver
- Ed Halicki
- George Hendrick
- Grant Jackson
- Cliff Johnson
- Mike Kekich
- Rafael Landestoy
- Larry Milbourne
- Bob Molinaro
- Sid Monge
- Bobby Ramos
- Frank Riccelli
- Tom Shopay
- Rennie Stennett
- Derrel Thomas
- Luis Tiant
- Steve Whitaker
