= 1970 Atlanta Braves season =

1970 Atlanta Braves
- League: National League
- Division: West
- Ballpark: Atlanta Stadium
- City: Atlanta
- Record: 76–86 (.469)
- Divisional place: 5th
- Owners: William Bartholomay
- General managers: Paul Richards
- Managers: Lum Harris
- Television: WSB-TV
- Radio: WSB (Ernie Johnson, Milo Hamilton)

The 1970 Atlanta Braves season was the fifth season in Atlanta along with the 100th season as a franchise overall. The team finished fifth in the National League West with a record of 76–86, 26 games behind the National League Champion Cincinnati Reds.

== Offseason ==
- January 17, 1970: Jack Pierce was drafted by the Braves in the 2nd round of the 1970 Major League Baseball draft.

== Regular season ==
In 1970, the Braves franchise celebrated its 100th season.

=== Season standings ===
NL West
Team	W	L	Pct.	GB	Home	Road
Cincinnati Reds	102	60	.630	—	57‍–‍24	45‍–‍36
Los Angeles Dodgers	87	74	.540	14½	39‍–‍42	48‍–‍32
San Francisco Giants	86	76	.531	16	48‍–‍33	38‍–‍43
Houston Astros	79	83	.488	23	44‍–‍37	35‍–‍46
Atlanta Braves	76	86	.469	26	42‍–‍39	34‍–‍47
San Diego Padres	63	99	.389	39	31‍–‍50	32‍–‍49

=== Record vs. opponents ===
1970 National League record Sources:
Team	ATL	CHC	CIN	HOU	LAD	MON	NYM	PHI	PIT	SD	SF	STL
Atlanta	—	8–4	5–13	9–9	6–12	6–6	6–6	7–5	6–6	9–9	7–11	7–5
Chicago	4–8	—	7–5	7–5	6–6	13–5	7–11	9–9	8–10	9–3	7–5	7–11
Cincinnati	13–5	5–7	—	15–3	13–5	7–5	8–4	7–5	8–4	8–10	9–9	9–3
Houston	9–9	5–7	3–15	—	8–10	8–4	6–6	4–8	6–6	14–4	10–8	6–6
Los Angeles	12–6	6–6	5–13	10–8	—	8–4	7–5	6–5	6–6	11–7	9–9	7–5
Montreal	6–6	5–13	5–7	4–8	4–8	—	10–8	11–7	9–9	6–6	6–6	7–11
New York	6–6	11–7	4–8	6–6	5–7	8–10	—	13–5	6–12	6–6	6–6	12–6
Philadelphia	5-7	9–9	5–7	8–4	5–6	7–11	5–13	—	4–14	9–3	8–4	8–10
Pittsburgh	6–6	10–8	4–8	6–6	6–6	9–9	12–6	14–4	—	6–6	4–8	12–6
San Diego	9–9	3–9	10–8	4–14	7–11	6–6	6–6	3–9	6–6	—	5–13	4–8
San Francisco	11–7	5–7	9–9	8–10	9–9	6–6	6–6	4–8	8–4	13–5	—	7–5
St. Louis	5–7	11–7	3–9	6–6	5–7	11–7	6–12	10–8	6–12	8–4	5–7	—

=== Notable transactions ===
- June 4, 1970: Rowland Office was drafted by the Braves in the 4th round of the 1970 Major League Baseball draft.
- July 5, 1970: Steve Barber was signed as a free agent by the Braves.
- July 12, 1970: Don Cardwell was purchased by the Braves from the New York Mets.
- August 31, 1970: Tony González was purchased from the Braves by the California Angels.
- September 21, 1970: Hoyt Wilhelm was selected off waivers from the Braves by the Chicago Cubs.

=== Roster ===
1970 Atlanta Braves
Roster
Pitchers: 24 Steve Barber; 45 Don Cardwell; 29 Aubrey Gatewood; 33 Pat Jarvis; 29 Larry Jaster; 27 Rick Kester; 27 Ron Kline; 22 Mike McQueen; 23 Jim Nash; 36 Julio Navarro; 31 Gary Neibauer; 35 Phil Niekro; 32 Milt Pappas; 37 Bob Priddy; 38 Ron Reed; 40 George Stone; 39 Hoyt Wilhelm	Catchers: 4 Bob Didier; 15 Hal King; 10 Bob Tillman; Infielders: 18 Tommie Aaron; 14 Bob Aspromonte; 6 Clete Boyer; 30 Orlando Cepeda; 11 Darrell Evans; 7 Gil Garrido; 16 Sonny Jackson; 17 Félix Millán; 32 Earl Williams	Outfielders: 44 Hank Aaron; 12 Dusty Baker; 45 Oscar Brown; 25 Rico Carty; 48 Ralph Garr; 43 Tony González; 19 Jimmie Hall; 28 Mike Lum	Manager: 26 Lum Harris; Coaches: 8 Jim Busby; 5 Harry Dorish; 9 Billy Goodman; 3 Ken Silvestri

== Player stats ==
=== Batting ===
==== Starters by position ====
Note: Pos = Position; G = Games played; AB = At bats; H = Hits; Avg. = Batting average; HR = Home runs; RBI = Runs batted in

Pos	Player	G	AB	H	Avg.	HR	RBI
C	Bob Tillman	71	223	53	.238	11	30
1B	Orlando Cepeda	148	567	173	.305	34	111
2B	Félix Millán	142	590	183	.310	2	37
SS	Sonny Jackson	103	328	85	.259	0	20
3B	Clete Boyer	134	475	117	.246	16	62
LF	Rico Carty	136	478	175	.366	25	101
CF	Tony González	123	430	114	.265	7	55
RF	Hank Aaron	150	516	154	.298	38	118

==== Other batters ====
Note: G = Games played; AB = At bats; H = Hits; Avg. = Batting average; HR = Home runs; RBI = Runs batted in

Player	G	AB	H	Avg.	HR	RBI
Gil Garrido	101	367	97	.264	1	19
Mike Lum	123	291	74	.254	7	28
Hal King	89	204	53	.260	11	30
Bob Didier	57	168	25	.149	0	7
Bob Aspromonte	62	127	27	.213	0	7
Ralph Garr	37	96	27	.281	0	8
Tommie Aaron	44	63	13	.206	2	7
Oscar Brown	28	47	18	.383	1	7
Jimmie Hall	39	47	10	.213	2	4
Darrell Evans	12	44	14	.318	0	9
Dusty Baker	13	24	7	.292	0	4
Earl Williams	10	19	7	.368	0	5

=== Pitching ===
==== Starting pitchers ====
Note: G = Games pitched; IP = Innings pitched; W = Wins; L = Losses; ERA = Earned run average; SO = Strikeouts

Player	G	IP	W	L	ERA	SO
Pat Jarvis	36	254.0	16	16	3.61	173
Phil Niekro	34	229.2	12	18	4.27	168
Jim Nash	34	212.1	13	9	4.07	153
George Stone	35	207.1	11	11	3.86	131
Ron Reed	21	134.2	7	10	4.41	68

==== Other pitchers ====
Note: G = Games pitched; IP = Innings pitched; W = Wins; L = Losses; ERA = Earned run average; SO = Strikeouts

Player	G	IP	W	L	ERA	SO
Mike McQueen	22	66.0	1	5	5.59	54
Milt Pappas	11	35.2	2	2	6.06	25
Steve Barber	5	14.2	0	1	4.91	11

==== Relief pitchers ====
Note: G = Games pitched; W = Wins; L = Losses; SV = Saves; ERA = Earned run average; SO = Strikeouts

Player	G	W	L	SV	ERA	SO
Hoyt Wilhelm	50	6	4	13	3.10	67
Bob Priddy	41	5	5	8	5.42	32
Julio Navarro	17	0	0	1	4.10	21
Don Cardwell	16	2	1	0	9.00	16
Rick Kester	15	0	0	0	5.57	20
Larry Jaster	14	1	1	0	6.85	9
Gary Neibauer	7	0	3	0	4.97	9
Ron Kline	5	0	0	1	7.11	3
Aubrey Gatewood	3	0	0	0	4.50	0

== Farm system ==
Level	Team	League	Manager
AAA	Richmond Braves	International League	Mickey Vernon
AA	Shreveport Braves	Texas League	Lou Fitzgerald and Clint Courtney
A	Greenwood Braves	Western Carolinas League	Eddie Haas
Rookie	Magic Valley Cowboys	Pioneer League	Paul Snyder
