= Pompano Beach Mets =

The Pompano Beach Mets were a minor league baseball franchise located in Pompano Beach, FL that played in the Florida State League from 1969 to 1973. They were a farm team of the New York Mets and played at Pompano Beach Municipal Stadium.

- Location: Pompano Beach, FL
- League: Florida State League (1969–1973)
- Affiliation: New York Mets (1969–1973)
- Ballpark: Pompano Beach Municipal Stadium

== Year-by-year record ==
Year	Record	Finish	Manager	Playoffs
1969	67-63	5th (t)	Joe Frazier	
1970	58-70	8th	Gordon Mackenzie	
1971	70-69	6th (t)	Gordon Mackenzie	
1972	73-59	3rd	Gordon Mackenzie	Lost in 1st round
1973	61-80	9th	Gordon Mackenzie	
