= Miguel Puente =

Mexican baseball player (born 1948)

- Pitcher
- Born: May 8, 1948 (age 77); San Luis Potosí, San Luis Potosí, Mexico
- Batted: Right Threw: Right

MLB debut
- May 3, 1970, for the San Francisco Giants

Last MLB appearance
- May 26, 1970, for the San Francisco Giants

MLB statistics
- Win–loss record: 1-3
- Strikeouts: 14
- Earned run average: 8.20
- Stats at Baseball Reference

Teams
- San Francisco Giants (1970)

Miguel Antonio Puente Aguilar (born May 8, 1948) is a Mexican former professional baseball pitcher. The right-hander was signed by the San Francisco Giants as an amateur free agent before the 1968 season, and he played for the Giants in 1970.

== Career ==
Puente's major league career lasted for about four weeks, starting four games and relieving in two others during the month of May. He did not perform well overall, giving up 36 baserunners (25 hits and 11 walks) and 17 earned runs in just 18.2 innings. He did, however, pitch one great game. On May 8, 1970, he pitched a seven-hit complete game against the World Champion New York Mets, winning 7–1 at Shea Stadium in front of a big crowd of 43,109.

Season and career totals include a 1–3 record, 14 strikeouts, 1 game finished, and an ERA of 8.20.
