= Jim Dunegan =

American baseball player (1947–2014)

- Pitcher
- Born: August 6, 1947; Burlington, Iowa, U.S.
- Died: October 20, 2014 (aged 67); Iowa City, Iowa, U.S.
- Batted: Right Threw: Right

MLB debut
- May 28, 1970, for the Chicago Cubs

Last MLB appearance
- September 17, 1970, for the Chicago Cubs

MLB statistics
- Win–loss record: 0–2
- Earned run average: 4.73
- Innings pitched: 13⅓
- Stats at Baseball Reference

Teams
- Chicago Cubs (1970)

James William Dunegan (August 6, 1947 – October 20, 2014) was an American professional baseball player. Although he spent much of his early minor league career as an outfielder and first baseman, he converted to pitcher in 1970 and appeared in seven games, all as a relief pitcher, that season for the Chicago Cubs of Major League Baseball. He threw and batted right-handed, stood 6 feet 1 inch (1.85 m) tall and weighed 205 pounds (93 kg).

Dunegan was selected by Chicago in the second round of the 1967 Major League Baseball draft. He hit a career-high 18 home runs in 1968 for the Class A Quincy Cubs of the Midwest League. After appearing as a pitcher in 14 total games during 1967–1968, and none in 1969, he became a full-time hurler in 1970, splitting the year between the MLB Cubs and their two top farm system affiliates.

In his debut as a pitcher, on May 30, he entered a game against the San Diego Padres with the Cubs trailing, 4–0, and worked four innings of one-run relief, enabling Chicago to climb back into a 4–4 tie. But the Padres broke through for one run off Dunegan to take a 5–4 lead, eventually pinning Dunegan with the loss. He also lost his only other Major League decision, in June — and also against the Padres. Altogether, he pitched in 13 1/3 innings, allowed 13 hits and 12 bases on balls, with three strikeouts. He left baseball after the 1972 season with a 16–19 pitching record, an earned run average of 4.44, a .246 batting average and 37 home runs as a minor leaguer.
