= Grant Jackson (baseball) =

American baseball player (1942–2021)

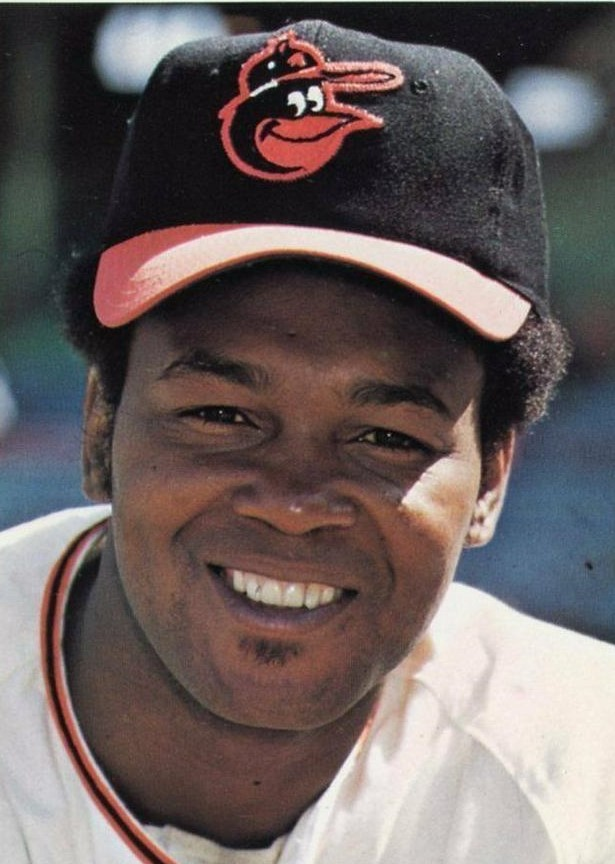
- Jackson in 1972
- Pitcher
- Born: September 28, 1942; Fostoria, Ohio, U.S.
- Died: February 2, 2021 (aged 78); North Strabane Township, Pennsylvania, U.S.
- Batted: Switch Threw: Left

MLB debut
- September 3, 1965, for the Philadelphia Phillies

Last MLB appearance
- September 8, 1982, for the Pittsburgh Pirates

MLB statistics
- Win–loss record: 86–75
- Earned run average: 3.46
- Strikeouts: 889
- Saves: 79
- Stats at Baseball Reference

Teams
- Philadelphia Phillies (1965–1970); Baltimore Orioles (1971–1976); New York Yankees (1976); Pittsburgh Pirates (1977–1981); Montreal Expos (1981); Kansas City Royals (1982); Pittsburgh Pirates (1982)

Career highlights and awards
- All-Star (1969); World Series champion (1979)

Grant Dwight Jackson (September 28, 1942 – February 2, 2021) was an American professional baseball pitcher who played eighteen seasons in Major League Baseball (MLB). He played for the Philadelphia Phillies, Baltimore Orioles, New York Yankees, Pittsburgh Pirates, Montreal Expos, and Kansas City Royals from 1965 to 1982. Jackson was a switch hitter who threw left-handed and served primarily as a relief pitcher.

Following his playing career, Jackson served as a coach for the Pirates and Cincinnati Reds.

== Early life ==
Jackson was born in Fostoria, Ohio, on September 28, 1942. He was the fourth of nine children of Joseph and Luella Jackson. His father died in 1960, and Jackson's older brother, Carlos, became a father figure to him. Jackson attended Fostoria High School, graduating in 1961. However, he did not attain the grades necessary to secure a scholarship to Bowling Green State University. There, he played briefly for the Bowling Green Falcons baseball team. He was signed as an amateur free agent by the Philadelphia Phillies in November 1961.

== Professional career ==
Jackson made his MLB debut with the Phillies in 1965. Jackson was named to the 1969 National League All-Star team, but did not appear in the game.

Made available by the Phillies because of several disagreements with manager Frank Lucchesi, Jackson was acquired along with Jim Hutto and Sam Parrilla by the Orioles for Roger Freed on December 15, 1970. In 1973, Jackson went 8–0, with a 1.90 earned run average (ERA) in 80.1 innings of work in 45 appearances with 47 strikeouts for the Orioles. From September 29 to October 1, 1974, Jackson won 3 consecutive games in relief.

Jackson was traded along with Ken Holtzman, Doyle Alexander, Elrod Hendricks and Jimmy Freeman from the Orioles to the New York Yankees for Rick Dempsey, Scott McGregor, Tippy Martinez, Rudy May and Dave Pagan at the trade deadline on June 15, 1976. After the season, Jackson was drafted by the Seattle Mariners from the Yankees as the 11th pick in the 1976 Major League Baseball expansion draft. A few weeks later, he was traded by the Mariners to the Pittsburgh Pirates for Craig Reynolds and Jimmy Sexton.

On September 1, 1981, Jackson was purchased by the Montreal Expos from the Pirates for $50,000. After the season, the Expos traded him to the Kansas City Royals for Ken Phelps. During the 1982 season, the Royals released Jackson, and he re-signed with Pittsburgh. He was released by the Pirates on October 4, 1982.

In his career, Jackson pitched in the World Series three times; in 1971 for the Orioles, 1976 for the Yankees, and 1979 for the Pirates, and was the winning pitcher for the Pirates in Game 7 of the 1979 World Series.

Jackson played for the Gold Coast Suns of the Senior Professional Baseball Association in 1989.

== Coaching career ==
Following his playing career, Jackson was the Pirates’ pitching/bullpen coach in 1983 through 1985 and a member of the Cincinnati Reds bullpen coaching staff in 1994 and 1995.

== Later life ==
Jackson retired from coaching in 2002. He was inducted into the Fostoria High School Hall of Fame two years later, as part of its inaugural class.

Jackson died from complications of COVID-19 at Canonsburg Hospital in Pennsylvania on February 2, 2021, at the age of 78.
