= Mike Ryan (catcher) =

American baseball player (1941–2020)

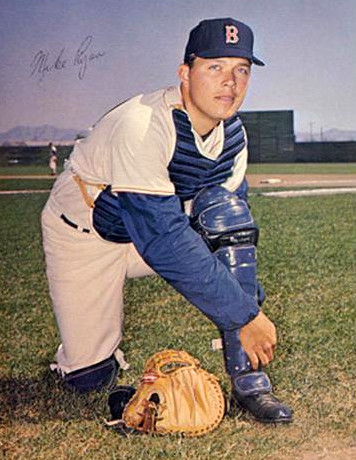
- Ryan in 1966
- Catcher
- Born: November 25, 1941; Haverhill, Massachusetts, U.S.
- Died: July 7, 2020 (aged 78); Wolfeboro, New Hampshire, U.S.
- Batted: Right Threw: Right

MLB debut
- October 3, 1964, for the Boston Red Sox

Last MLB appearance
- September 10, 1974, for the Pittsburgh Pirates

MLB statistics
- Batting average: .193
- Home runs: 28
- Runs batted in: 161
- Stats at Baseball Reference

Teams
- As player: Boston Red Sox (1964–1967); Philadelphia Phillies (1968–1973); Pittsburgh Pirates (1974); As coach: Philadelphia Phillies (1980–1995)

Career highlights and awards
- World Series champion (1980)

Michael James Ryan (November 25, 1941 – July 7, 2020) was an American professional baseball catcher who played 11 seasons in Major League Baseball, before becoming a longtime coach as well as a minor league manager. He played for the Boston Red Sox, Philadelphia Phillies and Pittsburgh Pirates from 1964 to 1974. He batted and threw right-handed, stood 6 feet 2 inches (1.88 m) tall and weighed 205 pounds (93 kg). He was a native of Haverhill, Massachusetts, where he graduated from St. James High School.

Ryan was signed as an amateur free agent by the Red Sox in 1960 and played for four of their minor league affiliates until September 1964, when he was promoted from Double-A to the major leagues. After spending 21/2 full seasons with Boston, he was traded to the Phillies after the Red Sox' 1967 American League pennant-winning campaign. He appeared in 392 games for the Phils over the next six years before he was dealt to the Pirates in 1974. He played only 15 games as a Buc—his last on September 10 of that year—but returned to the Phillies as a bullpen coach for 16 seasons, beginning in their world championship 1980 season.

== Playing career ==
After a one-game, late-season trial in 1964 and an extended audition in 1965, Ryan's major league career began in earnest in 1966. Although an excellent defensive catcher, he struggled as a hitter during his major league tenure. In 636 games played, he collected 370 hits in 1,920 at bats for a .193 batting average. Of all non-pitchers since 1930 with at least 1,000 at-bats, only one, Ray Oyler, at .175, has a lower average. During Ryan's nine full seasons in the majors, he batted over .200 only three times. As Boston's most-used catcher in 1966, Ryan hit .214 in 116 games. Three years later, again as a first-string receiver who appeared in 133 games with the 1969 Phillies, he hit a career-high 12 home runs and batted .204. Then, in 1973, in limited service backing up regular Bob Boone, Ryan hit .232 in 69 at bats. Ryan's solid defensive credentials were reflected by his .991 fielding percentage.

In 1967, appearing in a team-high 79 games as a catcher, Ryan helped the "Impossible Dream" Red Sox win the American League pennant. He was the roommate of Tony Conigliaro, before Conigliaro sustained a season-ending injury after being hit by a pitch on August 18. Ryan appeared in Game 4 of the 1967 World Series as a late-inning replacement for starting catcher Elston Howard, going hitless in two at bats against Baseball Hall of Famer Bob Gibson. Then in 1974, Ryan was a reserve on the Pirates team that won the National League Eastern Division.

On May 2, 1970, Ryan and Tim McCarver both broke their hands in a game between the Phillies and the San Francisco Giants. With their catching corps depleted, the Phils were forced to use Jim Hutto as a defensive substitute, even though he was an outfielder and first baseman. Ryan was able to return two months later on July 6, but landed on the disabled list again on August 15. Consequently, he played only 46 games that season.

== Longtime coach ==
After his playing career, Ryan managed and coached in the Pirates' and Phillies' minor league organizations from 1975 to 1979, then coached at the big-league level for the Phillies for 16 seasons, from 1980 until 1995. He had surgery following the 1993 season on his right shoulder, the cumulative result of his years of throwing batting practice and warming-up pitchers. He worked two more seasons with ongoing pain and retired after the 1995 season. He was on the staff of three National League champions in Philadelphia, and the 1980 World Series champion, and worked for seven managers. Ryan's coaching tenure with the Phillies was the longest in franchise history until it was surpassed by John Vukovich in 2004. It remains the second-longest coaching stint in franchise history as of 2020.

Ryan died in his sleep on July 7, 2020, in Wolfeboro, New Hampshire, at the age of 78.
