= Sam Parrilla =

Puerto Rican baseball player

- Left fielder
- Born: June 12, 1943; Santurce, Puerto Rico
- Died: February 9, 1994 (aged 50); Brooklyn, New York, U.S.
- Batted: Right Threw: Right

MLB debut
- April 11, 1970, for the Philadelphia Phillies

Last MLB appearance
- May 11, 1970, for the Philadelphia Phillies

MLB statistics
- Batting average: .125
- Home runs: 0
- Runs batted in: 0
- Stats at Baseball Reference

Teams
- Philadelphia Phillies (1970)

Samuel Parrilla Monges (June 12, 1943 – February 9, 1994) was a Puerto Rican professional baseball left fielder and pinch hitter, who played in Major League Baseball (MLB) for the Philadelphia Phillies, in 1970. He played in Minor League Baseball (MiLB) from 1963 to 1972. In 1994, he was shot and killed by a 15-year-old boy following an auto accident.

One of his daughters is actress Lana Parrilla, the star of the ABC fairy tale drama series Once Upon a Time.

== Early life and amateur career ==
Parrilla was born in Puerto Rico and moved to Brooklyn when he was three years old. He played baseball and football at John Jay High School. As a senior baseball player, he had a batting average of .450. He failed to attract the attention of scouts at tryout camps and, after graduating from high school, returned to Puerto Rico where he encountered former New York Yankees pitcher Luis Arroyo. After Parrilla took batting practice from Arroyo, Arroyo contacted scouts for several teams. He was ultimately signed by the Cleveland Indians.

== Minor league career ==
He spent ten seasons in the minor leagues, until 1972, hitting .282 with 104 home runs, 165 doubles and 36 triples in 1,039 games.

Perhaps his best season was 1969, when he hit .383 with 28 home runs and 85 RBI (all career highs) in 95 games for the Raleigh-Durham Phillies. That was the first of three consecutive seasons in which he would hit .330 or better.

He played in the Indians, New York Yankees, Phillies and Baltimore Orioles systems.

== Major league career ==
Parrilla was signed by the Philadelphia Phillies before the 1969 season.

He made his major league debut on April 11, 1970 and played his final big league game on May 11 of that year. In 11 games, he collected two hits in 16 at-bats for a .125 batting average. On May 3, he collected his first hit against San Francisco Giants pitcher Mike McCormick and on May 8, he collected his second hit - a double - off of Los Angeles Dodgers pitcher Claude Osteen.

He was traded along with Grant Jackson and Jim Hutto from the Phillies to the Orioles for Roger Freed on December 15, 1970.
