= Fred Wenz =

American baseball player (1941–2020)

- Pitcher
- Born: August 26, 1941; Bound Brook, New Jersey, U.S.
- Died: October 6, 2020 (aged 79); Branchburg, New Jersey, U.S.
- Batted: Right Threw: Right

MLB debut
- June 4, 1968, for the Boston Red Sox

Last MLB appearance
- September 29, 1970, for the Philadelphia Phillies

MLB statistics
- Win–loss record: 3–0
- Earned run average: 4.68
- Strikeouts: 38
- Stats at Baseball Reference

Teams
- Boston Red Sox (1968–1969); Philadelphia Phillies (1970)

Frederick Charles "Fireball" Wenz (August 26, 1941 – October 6, 2020) was an American middle relief pitcher in Major League Baseball who played from 1968 through 1970 for the Boston Red Sox (1968–69) and Philadelphia Phillies (1970). Listed at 6 ft 3 in (1.91 m), 214 lb (97 kg), he batted and threw right-handed.

Wenz was signed as an amateur free agent by the San Francisco Giants out of Somerville High School in 1959.

He earned his nickname as a minor leaguer when he struck out more than one batter per inning during his time in the Red Sox' farm system.

In 31 relief appearances, Wenz posted a 3–0 record with a 4.68 ERA and one save, giving up 22 runs (one unearned) on 36 hits and 25 walks while striking out 38 in 42 1/3 innings of work.

Wenz died on October 6, 2020, in Branchburg, New Jersey.
