= Mike Jackson (left-handed pitcher) =

American baseball player (born 1946)

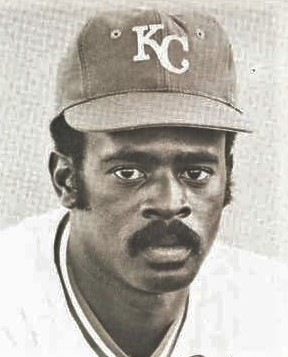
- Pitcher
- Born: March 27, 1946 (age 80); Paterson, New Jersey, U.S.
- Batted: Left Threw: Left

MLB debut
- May 10, 1970, for the Philadelphia Phillies

Last MLB appearance
- July 27, 1973, for the Cleveland Indians

MLB statistics
- Win–loss record: 2–3
- Earned run average: 5.80
- Strikeouts: 33
- Stats at Baseball Reference

Teams
- Philadelphia Phillies (1970); St. Louis Cardinals (1971); Kansas City Royals (1972–1973); Cleveland Indians (1973)

Michael Warren Jackson (born March 27, 1946) is an American former Major League Baseball relief pitcher. He pitched from 1970 to 1973 for the Philadelphia Phillies, St. Louis Cardinals, Kansas City Royals and Cleveland Indians. During a four-year baseball career, he compiled 2 wins, 33 strikeouts, and a 5.80 earned run average (ERA).

Jackson was signed by the Philadelphia Phillies after graduating high school in 1964, and spent the first two seasons in the Phillies minor league system before being signed by the Boston Red Sox. He served in the Army during the Vietnam War era, and missed the 1966 and 1967 seasons as a result. Jackson spent 1968 and 1969 with the Red Sox in the minor leagues, and finished the 1969 season with 11 wins, 10 losses, and a 4.76 ERA for the AAA Louisville Colonels. After the season, he was traded back to the Philadelphia Phillies for Gary Wagner.

Jackson made his major league debut with the Phillies against the Los Angeles Dodgers on May 10, 1970, in which he pitched the final 1 1/3 innings in a 7–0 loss, giving up three hits, walking one and striking out one. The very first batter he faced was future Baseball Hall of Fame pitcher Don Sutton. During the at bat, the Dodgers pulled off a double steal, with Willie Crawford stealing home. Sutton then doubled to score the Dodgers' final run of the game. He finished the season with a 1.42 ERA in five games, spending most of the season with the AAA Eugene Emeralds of the Pacific Coast League. On June 11, 1970, he pitched a no-hitter for the Emeralds against the Tucson Toros. After pitching in one game for the St. Louis Cardinals in 1971, Jackson spend two seasons with the Kansas City Royals, pitching in seven games in 1972 and nine in 1973. After being traded from the Royals to the Indians on June 8, 1973, for Steve Mingori, he pitched in his final game on July 27, 1973, and spent the rest of his career in the minors with the Oklahoma City 89ers and the Thetford Mines Pirates before retiring after the 1974 season.
