= Dick Colpaert =

American baseball player (1943–2021)

- Pitcher
- Born: January 3, 1943; Fraser, Michigan, U.S.
- Died: April 6, 2021 (aged 78); Utica, Michigan, U.S.
- Batted: Right Threw: Right

MLB debut
- July 21, 1970, for the Pittsburgh Pirates

Last MLB appearance
- August 10, 1970, for the Pittsburgh Pirates

MLB statistics
- Win–loss record: 1–0
- Earned run average: 5.91
- Innings pitched: 10 2/3
- Stats at Baseball Reference

Teams
- Pittsburgh Pirates (1970)

Richard Charles Colpaert (January 3, 1943 – April 6, 2021) was an American professional baseball player. He was a 5 ft 10 in (1.78 m), 182 lb (83 kg) right-handed pitcher who had a 13-season career in minor league baseball, highlighted by eight Major League appearances as a relief pitcher for the 1970 Pittsburgh Pirates.

Colpaert signed originally with the Baltimore Orioles and was drafted by Pittsburgh after his first pro season, in 1962. He was 26 years old and in the midst of his ninth pro season, almost exclusively spent as a reliever, when the Pirates recalled him from the Triple-A Columbus Jets. In his first two MLB appearances, Colpaert retired all nine batters he faced. In his second game, he received credit for a 6–5 victory over the Atlanta Braves on July 23, 1970, when he pitched a perfect eighth inning, retiring future Hall of Famers Henry Aaron and Orlando Cepeda in the process. He was largely effective as a reliever for the Pirates, with an earned run average of 2.89 heading into what would be his final MLB game on August 10. But on that day the New York Mets reached him for four earned runs on two hits and three bases on balls in only 1 1/3 innings, ballooning his career ERA by more than three full points.

All told, Colpaert worked 10 2/3 innings in the Majors, allowing nine hits, seven earned runs and eight bases on balls (two intentional), with six strikeouts. His minor league career continued into 1974.
