= Gordon Mackenzie =

American baseball player (1937-2014)

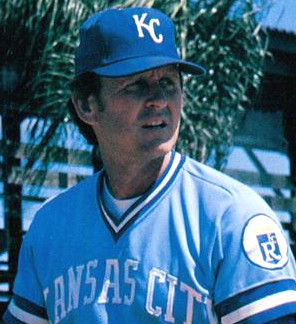
- MacKenzie in 1980
- Catcher
- Born: July 9, 1937; St. Petersburg, Florida, U.S.
- Died: August 12, 2014 (aged 77); St. Petersburg, Florida, U.S.
- Batted: Right Threw: Right

MLB debut
- August 13, 1961, for the Kansas City Athletics

Last MLB appearance
- September 16, 1961, for the Kansas City Athletics

MLB statistics
- Batting average: .125
- Home runs: 0
- RBI: 1
- Stats at Baseball Reference

Teams
- Kansas City Athletics (1961)

Henry Gordon Mackenzie (July 9, 1937 – August 12, 2014) was an American professional baseball player, manager, coach and scout. He appeared in 11 Major League games played during the final weeks of the 1961 season for the Kansas City Athletics, although collected only three singles and one base on balls in 25 plate appearances and never returned to the big leagues as a player..

A native of St. Petersburg, Florida, he was a catcher during his active playing career (1956–66), threw and batted right-handed, stood 5 feet 11 inches (1.80 m) tall and weighed 175 pounds (79 kg). Mackenzie signed with the Athletics after graduating from St. Petersburg High School.

He made his MLB debut on August 13, 1961, as a pinch hitter against the Chicago White Sox, and was a starting catcher for five late-season games, although that unsuccessful 1961 audition proved to be Mackenzie's only big-league playing experience.

However, he would manage in minor league baseball for 16 years, and spend eight seasons as a coach at the Major League level for the Kansas City Royals (1980–81), Chicago Cubs (1982), San Francisco Giants (1986–88) and Cleveland Indians (1991–92). He also scouted for the Los Angeles Dodgers and Washington Senators, and was an advance scout for the Indians and Houston Astros.

He won the Carolina League championship while managing the Kinston Indians in 1995. He was inducted in the Kinston Professional Baseball Hall of Fame in 2005.
