= Del Bates =

American baseball player (1940-2009)

- Catcher
- Born: June 12, 1940; Kirkland, Washington, US
- Died: September 24, 2009 (aged 69); Spokane, Washington, US
- Batted: Left Threw: Right

MLB debut
- May 6, 1970, for the Philadelphia Phillies

Last MLB appearance
- June 5, 1970, for the Philadelphia Phillies

MLB statistics
- Batting average: .133
- At bats: 60
- Hits: 8
- Stats at Baseball Reference

Teams
- Philadelphia Phillies (1970)

Delbert Oakley "Del" (or "Butch") Bates Jr. (June 12, 1940 – September 24, 2009), was an American professional baseball catcher, who played in Major League Baseball (MLB) for the Philadelphia Phillies, in 1970. In 22 career games, he had 8 hits, in 60 at-bats. Bates batted left-handed and threw right-handed.

Bates was born in Kirkland, Washington, in 1940. After graduating from Bothell High School, he served four years in the U.S. Navy, as a submariner, stationed in Honolulu, Hawaii. After being discharged, Bates was signed by the Los Angeles Angels, as an amateur free agent, in 1963.

After retiring from baseball, Bates was a longshoreman at the Port of Seattle. He was active in the International Longshore Union, Local 19, until retiring, in 2004. Bates died on September 24, 2009.
