= Jim Hutto =

American baseball player (born 1947)

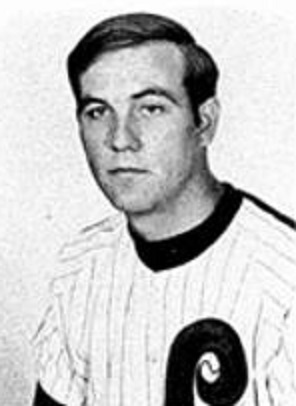
- Pinch hitter / Left fielder / First baseman
- Born: October 17, 1947 (age 78); Norfolk, Virginia, U.S.
- Batted: Right Threw: Right

MLB debut
- April 17, 1970, for the Philadelphia Phillies

Last MLB appearance
- September 28, 1975, for the Baltimore Orioles

MLB statistics
- Batting average: .175
- Home runs: 3
- Runs batted in: 12
- Stats at Baseball Reference

Teams
- Philadelphia Phillies (1970); Baltimore Orioles (1975)

James Neamon Hutto (born October 17, 1947) is an American former professional baseball player who appeared in 61 games as a utilityman in Major League Baseball (MLB) for the Philadelphia Phillies (1970) and the Baltimore Orioles (1975). Born in Norfolk, Virginia, he batted and threw right-handed and was listed as 5 feet 11 inches (1.80 m) tall and 195 pounds (88 kg).

== Baseball career ==
Hutto was selected out of Pensacola High School in the seventh round (135th overall) of the inaugural 1965 June amateur draft by the Boston Red Sox, then acquired by the St. Louis Cardinals in the minor-league draft two years later. After St. Louis swapped him to the Philadelphia Phillies for veteran first baseman Bill White on April 3, 1969, he made his debut with Phils on April 17, 1970, by flying out to center off future Baseball Hall of Fame pitcher Tom Seaver of the New York Mets at Shea Stadium. He spent the entire 1970 MLB season with Philadelphia, getting into 57 games with 13 games started as an outfielder.

The following December 15, Hutto was traded along with Grant Jackson and Sam Parrilla to the Baltimore Orioles for Roger Freed. Apart from four September 1975 contests with Baltimore, including one game started as a catcher, he became a fixture with the Triple-A Rochester Red Wings for five of the next six years, retiring in 1976 after 12 pro seasons. In the minor leagues, the versatile Hutto appeared in 403 games as a third baseman, 364 as a catcher, 214 as a first baseman and 154 as an outfielder.

His 17 major-league hits in 92 at bats (.185) included two doubles and three home runs. He had 12 runs batted in.
