= Rich Robertson (right-handed pitcher) =

American baseball player (born 1944)

- Pitcher
- Born: October 14, 1944 (age 80); Albany, California, U.S.
- Batted: Right Threw: Right

MLB debut
- September 10, 1966, for the San Francisco Giants

Last MLB appearance
- July 20, 1971, for the San Francisco Giants

MLB statistics
- Win–loss record: 13–14
- Earned run average: 4.94
- Strikeouts: 184
- Stats at Baseball Reference

Teams
- San Francisco Giants (1966–1971)

Richard Paul Robertson is a former Major League Baseball pitcher. He pitched six seasons in the major leagues, from 1966 until 1971, all for the San Francisco Giants. In 1970, he led the National League in wild pitches with 18.

== Sources ==
- Career statistics from MLB, or Baseball Reference, or Baseball Reference (Minors)
