= 1971 Pittsburgh Pirates season =

Major League Baseball club season

1971 Pittsburgh Pirates
- World Series champions National League champions National League East champions
- League: National League
- Division: East
- Ballpark: Three Rivers Stadium
- City: Pittsburgh, Pennsylvania (Note: From 1882 to 1906, the team played in Allegheny, Pennsylvania, which was annexed by Pittsburgh as the North Side in 1907.)
- Record: 97–65 (.599)
- Divisional place: 1st
- Owners: John W. Galbreath (majority shareholder); Bing Crosby, Thomas P. Johnson (minority shareholders)
- General managers: Joe L. Brown
- Managers: Danny Murtaugh
- Television: KDKA-TV 2 (Bob Prince, Nellie King)
- Radio: KDKA–AM 1020 (Bob Prince, Nellie King)
- Stats: ESPN.com; Baseball Reference

The 1971 Pittsburgh Pirates season was the 90th season for the Pittsburgh Pirates franchise; their 85th in the National League. It involved the Pirates finishing first in the National League East with a record of 97 wins and 65 losses. They defeated the San Francisco Giants three games to one in the NLCS and beat the Baltimore Orioles four games to three in the World Series. The Pirates were managed by Danny Murtaugh, and played their first full season at Three Rivers Stadium, which had opened in July the year before.

== Offseason ==
- October 15, 1970: Charlie Sands and 2 minor leaguers were traded to the Pirates by the New York Yankees for 3 minor leaguers.
- October 26, 1970: Joe Gibbon released by the Pirates.
- December 2, 1970: Freddie Patek, Bruce Dal Canton and Jerry May were traded by the Pirates to the Kansas City Royals for Bob Johnson, Jackie Hernández and Jim Campanis.
- January 29, 1971: Matty Alou and George Brunet were traded by the Pirates to the St. Louis Cardinals for Nelson Briles and Vic Davalillo.
- February 10, 1971: Danny Rivas (minors) was traded by the Pirates to the Mexico City Reds for Ramón Hernández.

== Regular season ==
In 1971, the Pirates became the first Major League Baseball team to field an all-black starting lineup. Taking the field, on September 1, was Rennie Stennett, Gene Clines, Roberto Clemente, Willie Stargell, Manny Sanguillén, Dave Cash, Al Oliver, Jackie Hernández, and Dock Ellis.

=== Season standings ===
NL East
Team	W	L	Pct.	GB	Home	Road
Pittsburgh Pirates	97	65	.599	—	52‍–‍28	45‍–‍37
St. Louis Cardinals	90	72	.556	7	45‍–‍36	45‍–‍36
Chicago Cubs	83	79	.512	14	44‍–‍37	39‍–‍42
New York Mets	83	79	.512	14	44‍–‍37	39‍–‍42
Montreal Expos	71	90	.441	25½	36‍–‍44	35‍–‍46
Philadelphia Phillies	67	95	.414	30	34‍–‍47	33‍–‍48

=== Record vs. opponents ===
1971 National League record Sources:
Team	ATL	CHC	CIN	HOU	LAD	MON	NYM	PHI	PIT	SD	SF	STL
Atlanta	—	5–7	9–9	9–9	9–9	7–5	7–5	8–4	4–8	11–7	7–11	6–6
Chicago	7–5	—	6–6	5–7	8–4	8–10	11–7	11–7	6–12	9–3	3–9	9–9
Cincinnati	9–9	6–6	—	5–13	7–11	7–5	8–4	5–7	5–7	10–8	9–9	8–4
Houston	9–9	7–5	13–5	—	8–10	4–8	5–7	8–4	4–8	10–8	9–9	2–10
Los Angeles	9–9	4–8	11–7	10–8	—	8–4	5–7	7–5	4–8	13–5	12–6	6–6
Montreal	5–7	10–8	5–7	8–4	4–8	—	9–9	6–12	7–11	6–5	7–5	4–14
New York	5–7	7–11	4–8	7–5	7–5	9–9	—	13–5	10–8	7–5	4–8	10–8
Philadelphia	4-8	7–11	2–10	3–9	5–7	6–10	5–13	—	6–12	4–8	6–6	7–11
Pittsburgh	8–4	12–6	7–5	8–4	8–4	11–7	8–10	12–6	—	9–3	3–9	11–7
San Diego	7–11	3–9	8–10	8–10	5–13	5–6	5–7	8–4	3–9	—	5–13	4–8
San Francisco	11–7	9–3	9–9	9–9	6–12	5–7	8–4	6–6	9–3	13–5	—	5–7
St. Louis	6–6	9–9	4–8	10–2	6–6	14–4	8–10	11–7	7–11	8–4	7–5	—

=== Notable transactions ===
- June 8, 1971: Craig Reynolds chosen by the Pirates in the 1st round of the 1971 Major League Baseball draft.
- August 10, 1971: Bob Miller was traded to the Pirates by the San Diego Padres for Johnny Jeter and Ed Acosta.
- August 10, 1971: Mudcat Grant was sold by the Pirates to the Oakland Athletics.

== Roster ==
1971 Pittsburgh Pirates
Roster
Pitchers: 28 Steve Blass; 22,34 Nelson Briles; 45 Frank Brosseau; 17 Dock Ellis; 31 Dave Giusti; 22,19 Mudcat Grant; 36 Ramón Hernández; 27 Bob Johnson; 25 Bruce Kison; 24 John Lamb; 32 Bob Miller; 38 Bob Moose; 32 Jim Nelson; 39 Bob Veale; 23 Luke Walker	Catchers: 29 Milt May; 4,72 Charlie Sands; 35 Manny Sanguillén; Infielders: 14 Gene Alley; 30 Dave Cash; 20 Richie Hebner; 2 Jackie Hernández; 9 Bill Mazeroski; 11 José Pagán; 7 Bob Robertson; 6 Rennie Stennett	Outfielders: 21 Roberto Clemente; 15 Gene Clines; 18 Vic Davalillo; 16 Al Oliver; 8 Willie Stargell; 12 Carl Taylor; 10,22 Richie Zisk; Other batters: 48 Rimp Lanier; 10 Frank Taveras	Manager: 40 Danny Murtaugh; Coaches: 43 Don Leppert (First Base); 44 Frank Oceak (Third Base); 42 Don Osborn (Pitching); 5 Dave Ricketts (Bullpen); 41 Bill Virdon (Hitting)

=== Opening Day lineup ===
Opening Day Starters
#	Name	Position
9	Bill Mazeroski	2B
20	Richie Hebner	3B
21	Roberto Clemente	RF
35	Manny Sanguillén	C
7	Bob Robertson	1B
8	Willie Stargell	LF
16	Al Oliver	CF
2	Jackie Hernández	SS
17	Dock Ellis	SP

== Game log ==
=== Regular season ===
Legend
	Pirates win
	Pirates loss
	Postponement
	Clinched division
**Bold**	Pirates team member

1971 regular season game log: 97–65 (Home: 52–28; Away: 45–37)
April: 12–10 (Home: 7–5; Away: 5–5)

#	Date	Time (ET)	Opponent	Score	Win	Loss	Save	Time of Game	Attendance	Record	Box/ Streak
1	April 6	1:35 p.m. EST	Phillies	4–2	**Ellis** (1–0)	Short (0–1)	—	2:21	39,712	1–0	W1
2	April 8	8:05 p.m. EST	Phillies	2–0	**Walker** (1–0)	Fryman (0–1)	—	1:47	12,289	2–0	W2
3	April 9	8:05 p.m. EST	@ Braves	8–2	**Moose** (1–0)	Jarvis (0–1)	**Giusti** (1)	2:23	32,734	3–0	W3
4	April 10	8:05 p.m. EST	@ Braves	4–5 (12)	Upshaw (2–0)	**Briles** (0–1)	—	2:41	13,079	3–1	L1
5	April 11	2:15 p.m. EST	@ Braves	1–3	Nash (1–0)	**Ellis** (1–1)	—	1:52	10,220	3–2	L2
6	April 12	7:35 p.m. EST	@ Phillies	4–3 (11)	**Giusti** (1–0)	Selma (0–1)	—	2:55	19,469	4–2	W1
7	April 13	7:35 p.m. EST	@ Phillies	9–3	**Briles** (1–1)	Short (0–2)	—	2:28	14,934	5–2	W2
8	April 14	7:35 p.m. EST	@ Phillies	5–6	Hoerner (1–0)	**Grant** (0–1)	Selma (1)	2:34	8,379	5–3	L1
9	April 16	2:15 p.m. EST	@ Mets	0–1	Seaver (2–0)	**Ellis** (1–2)	—	2:03	18,491	5–4	L2
10	April 17	2:15 p.m. EST	@ Mets	2–0	**Blass** (1–0)	Koosman (0–1)	—	2:01	23,305	6–4	W1
11	April 18 (1)	1:05 p.m. EST	@ Mets	2–5	Gentry (1–2)	**Walker** (1–1)	—	2:09	—	6–5	L1
12	April 18 (2)	3:49 p.m. EST	@ Mets	2–1	**Johnson** (1–0)	McGraw (1–1)	—	2:43	51,905	7–5	W1
13	April 20	8:05 p.m. EST	Braves	0–2	Niekro (1–1)	**Moose** (1–1)	—	1:58	8,755	7–6	L1
14	April 21	8:05 p.m. EST	Braves	10–2	**Ellis** (2–2)	Nash (1–1)	—	2:06	7,992	8–6	W1
15	April 22	8:05 p.m. EST	Braves	7–4	**Blass** (2–0)	Reed (2–2)	**Giusti** (2)	2:06	4,708	9–6	W2
16	April 23	8:05 p.m. EST	Giants	0–2	Stone (1–0)	**Walker** (1–2)	—	2:08	12,350	9–7	L1
17	April 24	2:15 p.m. EST	Giants	0–2	Bryant (2–0)	**Johnson** (1–1)	—	2:21	8,386	9–8	L2
18	April 25	1:35 p.m. EDT	Giants	6–2	**Briles** (2–1)	Marichal (3–2)	**Giusti** (3)	2:51	16,553	10–8	W1
19	April 27	8:05 p.m. EDT	Dodgers	5–7	Vance	**Ellis** (2–3)	Mikkelsen	2:46	6,518	10–9	L1
20	April 28	8:05 p.m. EDT	Dodgers	7–5	**Blass** (3–0)	O'Brien	**Giusti** (4)	2:16	6,191	11–9	W1
21	April 29	8:05 p.m. EDT	Dodgers	1–2	Mikkelsen	**Giusti** (1–1)	—	2:04	5,031	11–10	L1
22	April 30	8:05 p.m. EDT	Padres	5–3	**Nelson** (1–0)	Kelley	**Grant** (1)	2:06	5,944	12–10	W1

May: 17–9 (Home: 10–4; Away: 7–5)

#	Date	Time (ET)	Opponent	Score	Win	Loss	Save	Time of Game	Attendance	Record	Box/ Streak
23	May 1	2:15 p.m. EDT	Padres	5–4 (11)	**Grant** (1–1)	Laxton	—	2:55	6,068	13–10	W2
24	May 2	1:35 p.m. EDT	Padres	5–1	**Ellis** (3–3)	Arlin	**Giusti** (5)	2:05	8,482	14–10	W3
25	May 4	11:00 p.m. EDT	@ Giants	10–2	**Moose** (2–1)	Stone (2–1)	**Grant** (2)	2:53	8,263	15–10	W4
26	May 5	4:00 p.m. EDT	@ Giants	1–2	Marichal (4–2)	**Walker** (1–3)	—	2:02	5,212	15–11	L1
27	May 7	11:00 p.m. EDT	@ Dodgers	3–2	**Johnson** (2–1)	Sutton	**Grant** (3)	2:25	44,275	16–11	W1
28	May 8	10:00 p.m. EDT	@ Dodgers	5–3	**Briles** (3–1)	Downing	**Giusti** (6)	2:39	26,737	17–11	W2
29	May 9	4:00 p.m. EDT	@ Dodgers	11–5	**Veale** (1–0)	Mikkelsen	**Grant** (4)	3:16	26,349	18–11	W3
30	May 11	10:30 p.m. EDT	@ Padres	10–4	**Ellis** (4–3)	Coombs	**Giusti** (7)	2:33	4,440	19–11	W4
31	May 12	10:30 p.m. EDT	@ Padres	1–2	Roberts	**Walker** (1–4)	—	2:06	4,292	19–12	L1
32	May 14	8:05 p.m. EDT	Mets	2–8	Koosman (3–1)	**Johnson** (2–2)	—	2:23	17,622	19–13	L2
33	May 15	8:05 p.m. EDT	Mets	5–9	Sadecki (1–0)	**Blass** (3–1)	—	2:26	22,042	19–14	L3
34	May 16	1:35 p.m. EDT	Mets	4–2	**Ellis** (5–3)	Ryan (4–1)	**Giusti** (8)	2:11	18,968	20–14	W1
35	May 17	8:05 p.m. EDT	Expos	6–5	**Grant** (2–1)	Marshall	—	2:23	6,431	21–14	W2
36	May 18	8:05 p.m. EDT	Expos	3–2	**Johnson** (3–2)	Marshall	—	2:46	10,226	22–14	W3
37	May 19	8:05 p.m. EDT	@ Reds	6–1	**Moose** (3–1)	Nolan	**Giusti** (9)	2:22	11,109	23–14	W4
38	May 20	12:35 p.m. EDT	@ Reds	4–5	Wilcox	**Blass** (3–2)	Carroll	2:25	9,530	23–15	L1
39	May 21	8:05 p.m. EDT	@ Expos	6–2 (13)	**Grant** (3–1)	Reed	—	3:31	17,379	24–15	W1
40	May 22	8:05 p.m. EDT	@ Expos	2–5	Stoneman	**Walker** (1–5)	—	2:25	18,814	24–16	L1
41	May 23	2:15 p.m. EDT	@ Expos	2–4	McAnally	**Johnson** (3–3)	Marshall	2:34	27,216	24–17	L2
42	May 25	8:05 p.m. EDT	Reds	4–7	Grimsley	**Moose** (3–2)	Gibbon	2:15	8,607	24–18	L3
43	May 26	8:05 p.m. EDT	Reds	2–0	**Blass** (4–2)	Cloninger	—	2:09	7,369	25–18	W1
44	May 27	8:05 p.m. EDT	Reds	5–2	**Ellis** (6–3)	Merritt	—	2:00	7,408	26–18	W2
45	May 28	8:05 p.m. EDT	Cubs	2–4	Pappas	**Walker** (1–6)	—	2:24	12,776	26–19	L1
46	May 29	2:15 p.m. EDT	Cubs	9–4	**Johnson** (4–3)	Hands	**Giusti** (10)	2:23	12,336	27–19	W1
47	May 30	1:35 p.m. EDT	Cubs	10–0	**Moose** (4–2)	Holtzman	—	2:20	14,643	28–19	W2
48	May 31	11:05 a.m. EDT	Cubs	6–0	**Blass** (5–2)	Jenkins	—	2:09	19,589	29–19	W3

June: 20–10 (Home: 9–4; Away: 11–6)

#	Date	Time (ET)	Opponent	Score	Win	Loss	Save	Time of Game	Attendance	Record	Box/ Streak
49	June 1	8:05 p.m. EDT	Cardinals	9–0	**Ellis** (7–3)	Zachary	—	2:00	21,516	30–19	W4
50	June 2	8:05 p.m. EDT	Cardinals	10–1	**Walker** (2–6)	Cleveland	**Veale** (1)	2:33	9,612	31–19	W5
51	June 3	8:05 p.m. EDT	Cardinals	1–7	Carlton	**Johnson** (4–4)	—	2:21	18,947	31–20	L1
52	June 4	8:05 p.m. EDT	Astros	3–2	**Moose** (5–2)	Billingham	**Giusti** (11)	2:12	14,025	32–20	W1
53	June 5	8:05 p.m. EDT	Astros	1–4	Dierker	**Blass** (5–3)	Gladding	2:50	23,793	32–21	L1
54	June 6	1:35 p.m. EDT	Astros	9–8	**Ellis** (8–3)	Blasingame	**Veale** (2)	2:54	23,051	33–21	W1
55	June 7	2:30 p.m. EDT	@ Cubs	11–6	**Veale** (2–0)	Pappas	**Giusti** (12)	3:16	16,478	34–21	W2
56	June 8	2:30 p.m. EDT	@ Cubs	0–1 (12)	Holtzman	**Grant** (3–2)	—	2:35	14,878	34–22	L1
57	June 9	2:30 p.m. EDT	@ Cubs	1–3	Jenkins	**Moose** (5–3)	—	2:08	16,438	34–23	L2
58	June 10	9:05 p.m. EDT	@ Cardinals	3–1	**Blass** (6–3)	Reuss	—	2:20	18,950	35–23	W1
59	June 11	9:05 p.m. EDT	@ Cardinals	11–4	**Ellis** (9–3)	Cleveland	**Giusti** (13)	2:34	27,308	36–23	W2
60	June 12	8:05 p.m. EDT	@ Cardinals	4–3	**Grant** (4–2)	Arroyo	—	2:55	24,565	37–23	W3
61	June 13	2:15 p.m. EDT	@ Cardinals	8–4	**Giusti** (2–1)	Carlton	**Hernández** (1)	2:47	21,205	38–23	W4
62	June 14	8:30 p.m. EDT	@ Astros	4–5	Gladding	**Nelson** (1–1)	—	2:39	11,655	38–24	L1
63	June 15	8:30 p.m. EDT	@ Astros	3–0	**Blass** (7–3)	Dierker	—	2:27	16,307	39–24	W1
64	June 16	8:30 p.m. EDT	@ Astros	6–4	**Ellis** (10–3)	Blasingame	—	2:27	16,098	40–24	W2
65	June 18	8:05 p.m. EDT	Expos	9–8 (11)	**Giusti** (3–1)	Raymond	—	3:16	26,644	41–24	W3
66	June 19	2:15 p.m. EDT	Expos	1–10	Morton	**Moose** (5–4)	—	2:34	12,091	41–25	L1
67	June 20 (1)	1:05 p.m. EDT	Expos	7–1	**Blass** (8–3)	Stoneman	—	2:27	—	42–25	W1
68	June 20 (2)	4:07 p.m. EDT	Expos	7–3	**Briles** (4–1)	Britton	**Grant** (5)	2:17	32,301	43–25	W2
69	June 21	8:05 p.m. EDT	Mets	6–0	**Ellis** (11–3)	Koosman (3–5)	—	2:05	19,751	44–25	W3
70	June 22	8:05 p.m. EDT	Mets	2–3	Williams (3–1)	**Nelson** (1–2)	Frisella (7)	2:29	27,578	44–26	L1
71	June 23	8:05 p.m. EDT	Mets	6–2	**Walker** (3–6)	Gentry (6–5)	**Grant** (6)	2:28	31,225	45–26	W1
72	June 25	7:35 p.m. EDT	@ Phillies	14–4	**Blass** (9–3)	Bunning (5–9)	—	2:27	38,736	46–26	W2
73	June 26	2:15 p.m. EDT	@ Phillies	11–9	**Ellis** (12–3)	Short (4–9)	**Giusti** (14)	2:34	24,965	47–26	W3
74	June 27 (1)	1:05 p.m. EDT	@ Phillies	4–8	Fryman (2–3)	**Johnson** (4–5)	Hoerner (4)	2:28		47–27	L1
75	June 27 (2)	4:08 p.m. EDT	@ Phillies	10–9	**Veale** (3–0)	Hoerner (3–3)	**Giusti** (15)	2:59	37,062	48–27	W1
76	June 28	8:15 p.m. EDT	@ Cardinals	11–5	**Moose** (6–4)	Reuss	**Grant** (7)	2:44	15,024	49–27	W2
77	June 29	9:05 p.m. EDT	@ Cardinals	3–8	Cleveland	**Walker** (3–7)	—	2:30	14,586	49–28	L1
78	June 30	8:05 p.m. EDT	@ Mets	0–4	Ryan (8–4)	**Blass** (9–4)	Frisella (8)	2:08	50,399	49–29	L2

July: 18–10 (Home: 11–3; Away: 7–7)

#	Date	Time (ET)	Opponent	Score	Win	Loss	Save	Time of Game	Attendance	Record	Box/ Streak
79	July 1	2:05 p.m. EDT	@ Mets	3–0	**Ellis** (13–3)	Koosman (4–6)	**Giusti** (16)	3:03	26,650	50–29	W1
80	July 2	2:30 p.m. EDT	@ Cubs	5–1	**Moose** (7–4)	Jenkins	—	2:31	28,919	51–29	W2
81	July 3	2:15 p.m. EDT	@ Cubs	1–3	Pappas	**Johnson** (4–6)	—	2:06	31,422	51–30	L1
82	July 4	2:15 p.m. EDT	@ Cubs	7–9	Regan	**Giusti** (3–2)	Newman	2:56	30,401	51–31	L2
83	July 5	2:30 p.m. EDT	@ Cubs	6–2	**Blass** (10–4)	Holtzman	—	2:35	37,734	52–31	W1
84	July 6	8:05 p.m. EDT	Reds	5–2	**Ellis** (14–3)	McGlothlin	**Giusti** (17)	2:21	23,321	53–31	W2
85	July 7	8:05 p.m. EDT	Reds	9–3	**Johnson** (5–6)	Nolan	—	2:09	23,873	54–31	W3
86	July 8	8:05 p.m. EDT	Reds	7–1	**Kison** (1–0)	Gullett	**Giusti** (18)	2:25	22,534	55–31	W4
87	July 9	8:05 p.m. EDT	Braves	11–2	**Briles** (5–1)	Nash (6–6)	—	2:29	29,678	56–31	W5
88	July 10	2:15 p.m. EDT	Braves	5–4	**Grant** (5–2)	Niekro (9–8)	**Giusti** (19)	2:15	18,955	57–31	W6
—	July 11		Braves	**Postponed (Rain; Site change)** (Makeup date: August 23)							
**42nd All-Star Game in Detroit, Michigan**
89	July 15	8:05 p.m. EDT	Padres	4–3 (17)	**Nelson** (2–2)	Coombs	—	4:12	17,405	58–31	W7
90	July 16	8:05 p.m. EDT	Padres	2–1	**Johnson** (6–6)	Arlin	—	2:05	33,736	59–31	W8
91	July 17	2:15 p.m. EDT	Padres	9–2	**Ellis** (15–3)	Norman	—	2:39	14,278	60–31	W9
92	July 18 (1)	1:05 p.m. EDT	Dodgers	3–2	**Giusti** (4–2)	Downing	—	2:18	—	61–31	W10
93	July 18 (2)	3:58 p.m. EDT	Dodgers	7–1	**Walker** (4–7)	Singer	—	2:05	48,230	62–31	W11
94	July 19	8:05 p.m. EDT	Dodgers	4–10	Osteen	**Briles** (5–2)	—	2:46	17,437	62–32	L1
95	July 20	8:05 p.m. EDT	Giants	11–7	**Veale** (4–0)	Carrithers (1–1)	**Giusti** (20)	3:13	29,865	63–32	W1
96	July 21	8:05 p.m. EDT	Giants	4–8	Johnson (10–4)	**Giusti** (4–3)	Hamilton (3)	2:46	35,145	63–33	L1
97	July 22	12:35 p.m. EDT	Giants	7–8 (10)	Johnson (11–4)	**Moose** (7–5)	—	3:18	33,185	63–34	L2
98	July 23	10:30 p.m. EDT	@ Padres	4–0	**Kison** (2–0)	Kirby	—	1:57	10,133	64–34	W1
99	July 24	10:30 p.m. EDT	@ Padres	4–3	**Blass** (11–4)	Roberts	**Giusti** (21)	2:02	3,114	65–34	W2
100	July 25 (1)	4:00 p.m. EDT	@ Padres	1–2	Norman	**Johnson** (6–7)	—	2:02	—	65–35	L1
101	July 25 (2)	6:37 p.m. EDT	@ Padres	0–2	Arlin	**Moose** (7–6)	—	1:53	10,342	65–36	L2
102	July 27	11:00 p.m. EDT	@ Dodgers	5–8	Alexander	**Ellis** (15–4)	Mikkelsen	2:11	26,564	65–37	L3
103	July 28	11:00 p.m. EDT	@ Dodgers	4–0	**Walker** (5–7)	Singer	—	2;11	30,798	66–37	W1
104	July 29	11:00 p.m. EDT	@ Dodgers	8–5	**Veale** (5–0)	Osteen	**Giusti** (22)	2:54	23,590	67–37	W2
105	July 30	11:00 p.m. EDT	@ Giants	2–5	Perry (10–8)	**Kison** (2–1)	—	2:13	10,088	67–38	L1
106	July 31	4:00 p.m. EDT	@ Giants	11–15	McMahon (9–3)	**Giusti** (4–4)	Hamilton (4)	3:15	18,834	67–39	L2

August: 14–17 (Home: 6–9; Away: 8–8)

#	Date	Time (ET)	Opponent	Score	Win	Loss	Save	Time of Game	Attendance	Record	Box/ Streak
107	August 1 (1)	3:00 p.m. EDT	@ Giants	7–11	Johnson (12–4)	**Kison** (2–2)	McMahon (4)	2:28	—	67–40	L3
108	August 1 (2)	6:03 p.m. EDT	@ Giants	3–8	Reberger (3–0)	**Ellis** (15–5)	Carrithers (1)	2:31	33,301	67–41	L4
109	August 3	8:05 p.m. EDT	@ Expos	10–6	**Veale** (6–0)	Morton	**Giusti** (23)	2:21	18,137	68–41	W1
110	August 4	8:05 p.m. EDT	@ Expos	3–4 (11)	Marshall	**Grant** (5–3)	—	3:04	17,481	68–42	L1
111	August 5	8:05 p.m. EDT	@ Expos	7–2	**Kison** (3–2)	Strohmayer	—	2:20	21,233	69–42	W1
112	August 6	8:05 p.m. EDT	Phillies	2–3	Wilson (3–3)	**Ellis** (15–6)	—	2:34	21,323	69–43	L1
113	August 7	2:15 p.m. EDT	Phillies	3–5	Wise (11–9)	**Moose** (7–7)	Wilson (3)	2:36	29,565	69–44	L2
114	August 8 (1)	1:05 p.m. EDT	Phillies	2–3	Fryman (8–4)	**Blass** (11–5)	Hoerner (8)	2:22		69–45	L3
115	August 8 (2)	4:02 p.m. EDT	Phillies	4–0	**Johnson** (7–7)	Short (7–13)	—	2:11	31,448	70–45	W1
116	August 10	8:05 p.m. EDT	Cubs	1–2	Pizarro	**Kison** (3–3)	—	2:23	21,789	70–46	L1
117	August 11	8:05 p.m. EDT	Cubs	3–2	**Ellis** (16–6)	Regan	—	2:09	24,147	71–46	W1
118	August 12	8:05 p.m. EDT	Cardinals	2–3	Carlton	**Walker** (5–8)	—	2:09	21,805	71–47	L1
119	August 13	8:05 p.m. EDT	Cardinals	0–2	Reuss	**Blass** (11–6)	—	2:00	31,563	71–48	L2
120	August 14	8:05 p.m. EDT	Cardinals	0–11	Gibson	**Johnson** (7–8)	—	2:22	30,678	71–49	L3
121	August 15	1:35 p.m. EDT	Cardinals	4–6	Linzy	**Miller** (0–1)	Drabowsky	2:30	49,329	71–50	L4
122	August 16	8:05 p.m. EDT	Astros	8–3	**Ellis** (17–6)	Billingham	**Giusti** (24)	2:22	12,664	72–50	W1
123	August 17	8:05 p.m. EDT	Astros	5–6	Blasingame	**Miller** (0–2)	Ray	2:40	16,694	72–51	L1
124	August 18	8:05 p.m. EDT	Astros	3–2	**Miller** (1–2)	Lemaster	—	2:50	29,670	73–51	W1
125	August 19	8:05 p.m. EDT	@ Reds	5–1	**Johnson** (8–8)	McGlothlin	—	2:02	20,611	74–51	W2
126	August 20	8:05 p.m. EDT	@ Reds	0–6	Grimsley	**Kison** (3–4)	—	2;04	26,452	74–52	L1
127	August 21	2:15 p.m. EDT	@ Reds	3–6	Merritt	**Ellis** (17–7)	—	2:12	27,427	74–53	L2
128	August 22	2:15 p.m. EDT	@ Reds	3–6	Nolan	**Briles** (5–3)	—	2:31	31,431	74–54	L3
129	August 23 (1)	6:05 p.m. EDT	@ Braves	4–3	**Blass** (12–6)	Niekro (12–11)	**Giusti** (25)	2:08	—	75–54	W1
130	August 23 (2)	8:48 p.m. EDT	@ Braves	15–4	**Moose** (8–7)	Kelley (7–5)	**Briles** (1)	2:34	16,163	76–54	W2
131	August 24	8:05 p.m. EST	@ Braves	5–15	McQueen (4–1)	**Johnson** (8–9)	Upshaw (16)	2:24	8,478	76–55	L1
132	August 25	8:05 p.m. EST	@ Braves	13–6	**Moose** (9–7)	Jarvis (5–12)	**Miller** (1)	2:41	8,365	77–55	W1
133	August 27	8:30 p.m. EDT	@ Astros	7–3	**Ellis** (18–7)	Billingham	**Giusti** (26)	2:41	14,933	78–55	W2
134	August 28	8:30 p.m. EDT	@ Astros	0–4	Wilson	**Blass** (12–7)	—	2:20	25,619	78–56	L1
135	August 29	3:00 p.m. EDT	@ Astros	5–2	**Johnson** (9–9)	Blasingame	**Giusti** (27)	2:40	15,723	79–56	W1
136	August 30	8:05 p.m. EDT	Phillies	6–4	**Walker** (6–8)	Wilson (3–5)	**Giusti** (28)	3:04	13,399	80–56	W2
137	August 31	8:05 p.m. EDT	Phillies	7–5	**Kison** (4–4)	Hoerner (4–4)	**Miller** (2)	2:34	16,179	81–56	W3

September: 16–9 (Home: 9–3; Away: 7–6)

#	Date	Time (ET)	Opponent	Score	Win	Loss	Save	Time of Game	Attendance	Record	Box/ Streak
138	September 1	8:05 p.m. EDT	Phillies	10–7	**Walker** (7–8)	Brandon (6–6)	—	2:44	11,278	82–56	W4
139	September 3	8:05 p.m. EDT	Expos	4–6	Britton	**Giusti** (4–5)	Marshall	2:28	17,951	82–57	L1
140	September 4	2:15 p.m. EDT	Expos	7–6 (11)	**Giusti** (5–5)	Marshall	—	3:21	11,302	83–57	W1
141	September 5	1:35 p.m. EDT	Expos	8–2	**Kison** (5–4)	Stoneman	**Hernández** (2)	2:20	15,897	84–57	W2
142	September 6 (1)	10:35 a.m. EDT	Cubs	4–1	**Briles** (6–3)	Pizarro	—	2:07	—	85–57	W3
143	September 6 (2)	1:17 p.m. EDT	Cubs	10–5	**Walker** (8–8)	Holtzman	**Moose** (1)	2:26	39,236	86–57	W4
144	September 8	8:05 p.m. EDT	Cubs	10–1	**Blass** (13–7)	Pappas	—	2:19	15,937	87–57	W5
145	September 10	8:05 p.m. EDT	@ Expos	2–3 (11)	Strohmayer	**Giusti** (5–6)	—	3:24	21,529	87–58	L1
146	September 11	2:15 p.m. EDT	@ Expos	1–4	McAnally	**Kison** (5–5)	—	2;12	18,376	87–59	L2
147	September 12	2:15 p.m. EDT	@ Expos	4–0	**Briles** (7–3)	Renko	—	2:10	16,770	88–59	W1
148	September 13	2:30 p.m. EDT	@ Cubs	5–1	**Blass** (14–7)	Pappas	—	2:18	6,477	89–59	W2
149	September 14	2:30 p.m. EDT	@ Cubs	4–3	**Moose** (10–7)	Jenkins	—	2:25	9,706	90–59	W3
150	September 15	8:05 p.m. EDT	Cardinals	4–1	**Ellis** (19–7)	Carlton	**Hernández** (3)	1:57	21,751	91–59	W4
151	September 16	8:05 p.m. EDT	Cardinals	6–1	**Walker** (9–8)	Reuss	**Hernández** (4)	2:35	18,127	92–59	W5
152	September 17	8:05 p.m. EDT	Mets	0–3	Gentry (12–10)	**Briles** (7–4)	—	1:59	23,421	92–60	L1
153	September 18	2:15 p.m. EDT	Mets	4–0	**Blass** (15–7)	Sadecki (7–7)	—	1:42	20,470	93–60	W1
154	September 19	1:35 p.m. EDT	Mets	2–5	Williams (5–6)	**Johnson** (9–10)	Frisella (12)	2:34	40,337	93–61	L1
155	September 21	9:05 p.m. EDT	@ Cardinals	4–6	Drabowsky	**Ellis** (19–8)	—	2:20	13,348	93–62	L2
156	September 22	9:05 p.m. EDT	@ Cardinals	5–1	**Walker** (10–8)	Gibson	**Giusti** (29)	2:07	14,845	94–62	W1
157	September 23	9:05 p.m. EDT	@ Cardinals	5–0	**Briles** (8–4)	Cleveland	—	2:19	10,918	95–62	W2
158	September 24	8:05 p.m. EDT	@ Mets	3–2	**Kison** (6–5)	Koosman (6–11)	**Miller** (3)	1:56	35,936	96–62	W3
159	September 25	2:15 p.m. EDT	@ Mets	1–2 (15)	Frisella (8–5)	**Hernández** (0–1)	—	3:50	29,295	96–63	L1
160	September 26	2:05 p.m. EDT	@ Mets	1–3	Seaver (19–10)	**Blass** (15–8)	—	1:53	30,519	96–64	L2
161	September 28	7:35 p.m. EDT	@ Phillies	3–6	Wise (17–14)	**Ellis** (19–9)	—	2:19	14,582	96–65	L3
162	September 30	7:35 p.m. EDT	@ Phillies	4–3	**Moose** (11–7)	Champion (3–5)	**Giusti** (30)	2:12	14,157	97–65	W1

=== Detailed records ===
National League
Opponent	W	L	WP	RS	RA
NL East
Chicago Cubs	12	6	0.667	95	48
Montreal Expos	11	7	0.611	89	73
New York Mets	8	10	0.444	45	50
Philadelphia Phillies	12	6	0.667	104	80
**Pittsburgh Pirates**					
St. Louis Cardinals	11	7	0.611	90	64
Div Total	54	36	0.600	423	315
NL West
Atlanta Braves	8	4	0.667	83	52
Cincinnati Reds	7	5	0.583	53	40
Houston Astros	8	4	0.667	54	43
Los Angeles Dodgers	8	4	0.667	63	50
San Diego Padres	9	3	0.750	50	27
San Francisco Giants	3	9	0.250	62	72
Div Total	43	29	0.597	365	284
Season Total	97	65	0.599	788	599

Month	Games	Won	Lost	Win %	RS	RA
April	22	12	10	0.545	84	62
May	26	17	9	0.654	129	85
June	30	20	10	0.667	175	127
July	28	18	10	0.643	149	109
August	31	14	17	0.452	140	144
September	25	16	9	0.640	111	72
Total	162	97	65	0.599	788	599

	Games	Won	Lost	Win %	RS	RA
Home	80	52	28	0.650	393	279
Away	82	45	37	0.549	395	320
Total	162	97	65	0.599	788	599

=== Composite Box ===
1971 Pittsburgh Pirates Inning–by–Inning Boxscore
Team	1	2	3	4	5	6	7	8	9	10	11	12	13	14	15	16	17	R	H	E
Opponents	79	60	80	54	56	60	83	70	49	1	2	2	1	0	1	2	1	599	1,426	156
Pirates	105	66	88	93	84	94	101	86	60	0	4	0	5	0	1	1	1	788	1,555	133

=== Postseason Game log ===
Legend
	Pirates win
	Pirates loss
**Bold**	Pirates team member

1971 Postseason game log: 7–4 (Home: 5–0; Away: 2–4)
NL Championship Series: vs. San Francisco Giants 3–1 (Home: 2–0; Away: 1–1)

#	Date	Time (ET)	Opponent	Score	Win	Loss	Save	Time of Game	Attendance	Series	Box/ Streak
1	October 2	4:00 p.m. EDT	@ Giants	4–5	Perry (1–0)	**Blass** (0–1)	—	2:44	40,977	SFN 1–0	L1
2	October 3	4:00 p.m. EDT	@ Giants	9–4	**Ellis** (1–0)	Cumberland (0–1)	—	3:23	42,562	TIE 1–1	W1
3	October 5	1:30 p.m. EDT	Giants	2–1	**Johnson** (1–0)	Marichal (0–1)	—	2:26	38,222	PIT 2–1	W2
4	October 6	1:30 p.m. EDT	Giants	9–5	**Kison** (1–0)	Perry (1–1)	—	3:00	35,487	PIT 3–1	W3

World Series: vs. Baltimore Orioles 4–3 (Home: 3–0; Away: 1–3)

#	Date	Time (ET)	Opponent	Score	Win	Loss	Save	Time of Game	Attendance	Series	Box/ Streak
1	October 9	1:00 p.m. EDT	@ Orioles	3–5	McNally (2–0)	**Ellis** (1–1)	—	2:06	53,229	BAL 1–0	L1
—	October 10		@ Orioles	**Postponed (Rain)** (Makeup date: October 11)						BAL 1–0	
2	October 11	1:00 p.m. EDT	@ Orioles	3–11	Palmer (2–0)	**Johnson** (1–1)	Hall (1)	2:55	53,239	BAL 2–0	L2
3	October 12	1:00 p.m. EDT	Orioles	5–1	**Blass** (1–1)	Cuellar (1–1)	—	2:20	50,403	BAL 2–1	W1
4	October 13	8:15 p.m. EDT	Orioles	4–3	**Kison** (2–0)	Watt (0–1)	**Giusti** (1)	2:48	51,378	TIE 2–2	W2
5	October 14	1:00 p.m. EDT	Orioles	4–0	**Briles** (1–0)	McNally (2–1)	—	2:16	51,377	PIT 3–2	W3
6	October 16	1:00 p.m. EDT	@ Orioles	2–3 (10)	McNally (3–1)	**Miller** (0–1)	—	2:59	44,174	TIE 3–3	L1
7	October 17	2:00 p.m. EDT	@ Orioles	2–1	**Blass** (2–1)	Cuellar (1–2)	—	2:10	47,291	PIT 4–3	W1

== Postseason ==
=== National League Championship Series ===
The Pittsburgh Pirates won the series over the San Francisco Giants, 3–1

Game	Score	Date	Location	Attendance
1	Pittsburgh – 4, San Francisco – 5	October 2	Candlestick Park	40,977
2	Pittsburgh – 9, San Francisco – 4	October 3	Candlestick Park	42,562
3	San Francisco – 1, Pittsburgh – 2	October 5	Three Rivers Stadium	38,322
4	San Francisco – 5, Pittsburgh – 9	October 6	Three Rivers Stadium	35,487

=== World Series ===
1971 World Series Program – Pittsburgh Pirates' version

==== Composite box ====
1971 World Series (4–3): Pittsburgh Pirates (N.L.) over Baltimore Orioles (A.L.)

Team	1	2	3	4	5	6	7	8	9	10	R	H	E
Pittsburgh Pirates	3	6	3	1	1	1	4	4	0	0	23	56	3
Baltimore Orioles	3	2	3	3	7	2	2	1	0	1	24	45	9
Total attendance: 351,091 Average attendance: 50,156; Winning player's share: $18,165 Losing player's share: $13,906

== Starting Lineups ==
=== Regular Season ===
==== Batting Order ====
1971 Regular Season Batting Order game log
April

#	Date	Opponent	1st	2nd	3rd	4th	5th	6th	7th	8th	9th

May

#	Date	Opponent	1st	2nd	3rd	4th	5th	6th	7th	8th	9th

June

#	Date	Opponent	1st	2nd	3rd	4th	5th	6th	7th	8th	9th

July

#	Date	Opponent	1st	2nd	3rd	4th	5th	6th	7th	8th	9th

August

#	Date	Opponent	1st	2nd	3rd	4th	5th	6th	7th	8th	9th

September

#	Date	Opponent	1st	2nd	3rd	4th	5th	6th	7th	8th	9th

==== Defensive Lineup ====
1971 Regular Season Defensive Lineup game log
April

#	Date	Opponent	C	1B	2B	3B	SS	LF	CF	RF	P

May

#	Date	Opponent	C	1B	2B	3B	SS	LF	CF	RF	P

June

#	Date	Opponent	C	1B	2B	3B	SS	LF	CF	RF	P

July

#	Date	Opponent	C	1B	2B	3B	SS	LF	CF	RF	P

August

#	Date	Opponent	C	1B	2B	3B	SS	LF	CF	RF	P

September

#	Date	Opponent	C	1B	2B	3B	SS	LF	CF	RF	P

=== Postseason ===
==== Batting Order ====
1971 Postseason Batting Order game log
NL Championship Series: vs. San Francisco Giants

#	Date	Opponent	1st	2nd	3rd	4th	5th	6th	7th	8th	9th

World Series: vs. Baltimore Orioles

#	Date	Opponent	1st	2nd	3rd	4th	5th	6th	7th	8th	9th

==== Defensive Lineup ====
1971 Postseason Batting Order game log
NL Championship Series: vs. San Francisco Giants

#	Date	Opponent	C	1B	2B	3B	SS	LF	CF	RF	P

World Series: vs. Baltimore Orioles

#	Date	Opponent	C	1B	2B	3B	SS	LF	CF	RF	P

== Game Umpires ==
=== Regular Season ===
1971 Regular Season Umpire game log
April

#	Date	Opponent	HP	1B	2B	3B

May

#	Date	Opponent	HP	1B	2B	3B

June

#	Date	Opponent	HP	1B	2B	3B

July

#	Date	Opponent	HP	1B	2B	3B

August

#	Date	Opponent	HP	1B	2B	3B

September

#	Date	Opponent	HP	1B	2B	3B

=== Postseason ===
1971 Postseason Batting Order game log
NL Championship Series: vs. San Francisco Giants

#	Date	Opponent	HP	1B	2B	3B	LF	RF

World Series: vs. Baltimore Orioles

#	Date	Opponent	HP	1B	2B	3B	LF	RF

== Player stats ==
= Indicates team leader

= indicates league leader

=== Batting ===
==== Starters by position ====
Note: Pos = Position; G = Games played; AB = At bats; R = Runs scored; H = Hits; Avg. = Batting average; HR = Home runs; RBI = Runs batted in; SB = Stolen bases

Pos	Player	G	AB	R	H	Avg.	HR	RBI	SB
C	Manny Sanguillén	138	533	61	170	.319	7	81	6
1B	Bob Robertson	131	469	65	127	.271	26	72	1
2B	Dave Cash	123	478	79	138	.289	2	34	13
3B	Richie Hebner	112	388	50	105	.271	17	67	2
SS	Gene Alley	114	348	38	79	.227	6	28	9
CF	Al Oliver	143	529	69	149	.282	14	64	4
LF	Willie Stargell	141	511	104	151	.295	48	125	0
RF	Roberto Clemente	132	522	82	178	.341	13	86	1

==== Other batters ====
Note: G = Games played; AB = At bats; R = Runs scored; H = Hits; Avg. = Batting average; HR = Home runs; RBI = Runs batted in; SB = Stolen bases

Player	G	AB	R	H	Avg.	HR	RBI	SB
Vic Davalillo	99	295	48	84	.285	1	33	10
Gene Clines	97	273	52	84	.308	1	24	15
Jackie Hernández	88	233	30	48	.206	3	26	0
Bill Mazeroski	70	193	17	49	.254	1	16	0
José Pagán	57	158	16	38	.241	5	15	0
Milt May	49	126	15	35	.278	6	25	0
Rennie Stennett	50	153	24	54	.353	1	15	1
Charlie Sands	28	25	4	5	.200	1	5	0
Richie Zisk	7	15	2	3	.200	1	2	0
Carl Taylor	7	12	1	2	.167	0	0	0
Rimp Lanier	6	4	0	0	.000	0	0	0
Frank Taveras	1	0	0	0	----	0	0	0

=== Pitching ===
==== Starting pitchers ====
Note: G = Games pitched; IP = Innings pitched; W = Wins; L = Losses; ERA = Earned run average; BB = Walks allowed; SO = Strikeouts

Player	G	IP	W	L	ERA	BB	SO
Steve Blass	33	240.0	15	8	2.85	68	136
Dock Ellis	31	226.2	19	9	3.06	63	137
Bob Johnson	31	174.2	9	10	3.45	55	101
Luke Walker	28	159.2	10	8	3.55	53	86

==== Other pitchers ====
Note: G = Games pitched; IP = Innings pitched; W = Wins; L = Losses; ERA = Earned run average; BB = Walks allowed; SO = Strikeouts

Player	G	IP	W	L	ERA	BB	SO
Bob Moose	30	140.0	11	7	4.11	35	68
Nelson Briles	37	136.0	8	4	3.04	35	76
Bruce Kison	18	95.1	6	5	3.40	36	60

==== Relief pitchers ====
Note: G = Games pitched; IP = Innings pitched; W = Wins; L = Losses; SV = Saves; ERA = Earned run average; BB = Walks allowed; SO = Strikeouts

Player	G	IP	W	L	SV	ERA	BB	SO
Dave Giusti	58	86.0	5	6	30	2.93	31	55
Mudcat Grant	42	75.0	5	3	7	3.60	28	22
Bob Veale	37	46.1	6	0	2	6.99	24	40
Jim Nelson	17	34.2	2	2	0	2.34	25	11
Bob Miller	16	28.0	1	2	3	1.29	13	13
Ramón Hernández	10	12.1	0	1	4	0.73	2	7
John Lamb	2	4.1	0	0	0	0.00	1	1
Frank Brosseau	1	2.0	0	0	0	0.00	0	0

== Awards and honors ==
- Roberto Clemente, Babe Ruth Award
- Roberto Clemente, World Series Most Valuable Player Award
- Roberto Clemente, Gold Glove Award

=== League leaders ===
- Willie Stargell, National League home run champion (48)
- Dave Giusti, Saves leader (30)

=== All-Stars ===
1971 Major League Baseball All-Star Game

- Dock Ellis, pitcher, starter
- Willie Stargell, outfield, starter
- Roberto Clemente, reserve
- Vic Davalillo, reserve
- Manny Sanguillén, reserve

== Farm system ==
Level	Team	League	Manager
AAA	Charleston Charlies	International League	Joe Morgan
AA	Waterbury Pirates	Eastern League	Red Davis
A	Salem Rebels	Carolina League	Tim Murtaugh
A	Monroe Pirates	Western Carolinas League	Tom Saffell
A-Short Season	Niagara Falls Pirates	New York–Penn League	Chuck Cottier and Dick Cole
Rookie	GCL Pirates	Gulf Coast League	Ed Napoleon

== Sources ==
- Johnson, Lloyd; Wolff, Miles, eds. (1997). The Encyclopedia of Minor League Baseball (2nd ed.). Durham, North Carolina: Baseball America. ISBN 978-0-9637189-8-3.
- Markusen, Bruce (2009). The Team That Changed Baseball: Roberto Clemente and the 1971 Pittsburgh Pirates. Yardley, Pennsylvania: Westholme Publishing. ISBN 978-1-59416-089-9.
