= Bruce Kison =

American baseball player (1950–2018)

- Pitcher
- Born: February 18, 1950; Pasco, Washington, U.S.
- Died: June 2, 2018 (aged 68); Bradenton, Florida, U.S.
- Batted: Right Threw: Right

MLB debut
- July 4, 1971, for the Pittsburgh Pirates

Last MLB appearance
- October 5, 1985, for the Boston Red Sox

MLB statistics
- Win–loss record: 115–88
- Earned run average: 3.66
- Strikeouts: 1,073
- Stats at Baseball Reference

Teams
- As player: Pittsburgh Pirates (1971–1979); California Angels (1980–1984); Boston Red Sox (1985); As coach: Kansas City Royals (1994–1998); Baltimore Orioles (1999)

Career highlights and awards
- 2× World Series champion (1971, 1979)

Bruce Eugene Kison (February 18, 1950 – June 2, 2018) was an American professional baseball pitcher, who played in Major League Baseball (MLB) for the Pittsburgh Pirates (1971–79), California Angels (1980–84) and Boston Red Sox (1985). Known as The Whip because of his sidearm delivery and fearless approach on the mound, he was part of two World Series championship teams with the Pirates, both over the favored Baltimore Orioles. Kison is perhaps best remembered for his performance as a rookie in the crucial Game 4 of the 1971 World Series, in which he pitched 6 1/3 scoreless innings in emergency relief. He batted and pitched right-handed.

Kison grew up in Pasco, Washington and was drafted by the Pirates in the 14th round of the 1968 Major League Baseball draft and reached the major leagues three years later. In 1971, he relieved Luke Walker in the first inning of Game 4 of the World Series, throwing 6 1/3 scoreless innings as he enabled the Pirates to come from behind to win the game, and ultimately the Series. Bothered by a sore shoulder the next two years, Kison adjusted his delivery in the 1973–74 offseason, becoming a full-time starter by the middle of 1974. In 1976, he set career highs in wins (14) and earned run average (ERA) (3.08). He had a disappointing 1977 season, partly because of hangnail problems, and in 1978, he was moved back to the bullpen to start the year. He regained his rotation spot halfway through the season, though, and proved an important member of the Pirates' rotation once again in 1979, winning the season's final game to send the Pirates to the playoffs. He struggled in his only start of the World Series but won his second World Series ring as the Pirates defeated the Orioles again.

A free agent after the 1979 season, he signed a five-year contract with the Angels, but struggled with injuries his first couple of seasons and even tried to give the team back some of his contract money. In 1982, though, he helped the Angels reach the playoffs and won a game for them in the American League Championship Series against the Milwaukee Brewers. A herniated disk suffered in 1983 threatened to end his career, but he returned to the Angels late in 1984 and pitched one final season for the Boston Red Sox in 1985 before retiring. During a 15-year career, Kison compiled 115 wins with 88 losses, 1,073 strikeouts, and a 3.66 ERA. After his playing days were over, he served as a coach for the Kansas City Royals and the Baltimore Orioles, with whom he later served as a scout. He died June 2, 2018, at the age of 68.

== Early life ==
Kison was born February 18, 1950, in Pasco, Washington. His father, Fred, worked as a building supplier, while his mother, Bertha, focused on homemaking. Kison started playing baseball in elementary school and was a pitcher and outfielder by the age of 12. At 14, an injury in a PONY League game caused him to start throwing sidearm. At Pasco High School, Kison threw three no-hitters, before getting selected by the Pittsburgh Pirates in the 14th round of the 1968 Major League Baseball draft.

== Career ==
=== Pittsburgh Pirates (1971–1979) ===
Kison credited Harvey Haddix, a coach he had in the Gulf Coast League, as his most influential mentor. While pitching for the Waterbury Pirates of the Double-A Eastern League in 1970, Kison was picked by Sports Illustrated to be the subject of an article (released the following year) on life in the minor leagues. He had a 4–4 record at the time; he would not lose another game for Waterbury in 1970. An infected tendon in his pitching hand kept him from throwing in spring training in 1971, but he won 10 of 12 starts for the Charleston Charlies of the Triple-A International League. That strong start earned him a call-up to Pittsburgh for the first time in July, when Bob Moose had to serve a two-week stint in the United States Army Reserve. Kison made his debut on July 4 at Wrigley Field, allowing four runs over six innings in a no-decision against the Chicago Cubs. On July 23, he threw a complete game shutout against the San Diego Padres; Ed Spiezio remarked after the game that "Kison had the best stuff I've seen this season." He ended his rookie season 6–5 with a 3.40 earned run average (ERA) in 18 games (13 starts) and was part of the Pirates' playoff roster as a relief pitcher.

Though not used as a starter during the playoffs, Kison earned a couple of victories. During Game 4 of the National League Championship Series (NLCS) against the San Francisco Giants, Kison relieved Steve Blass after Blass had given up five runs in the first two innings. He threw 4 2/3 scoreless innings of relief, then picked up the win as the Pirates prevailed 9–5, earning a spot in the World Series. "Chills ran down my back," he said after the game. "If you don’t go out to the mound scared, you better get out of the game.” Kison then went on to be the winning pitcher in the first night game ever played in the Fall Classic. After Luke Walker gave up three runs to the Orioles in the first inning of Game 4, Kison entered, retired Davey Johnson on a groundout to end the inning, and threw six more scoreless innings as the Pirates came from behind to win the game 4–3, before ultimately winning the Series in seven games. Earl Weaver, manager of the Orioles, said of Kison's performance, "Kison turned the Series around."

After the 1971 season, Kison threw 92 innings for San Juan in the Puerto Rican Winter League. This led to a "tired arm," which caused him to begin the 1972 season on the disabled list for the Pirates. After returning, he joined the bullpen for the Pirates, posting a 2.22 ERA through the end of May. In June, he replaced Bob Johnson in Pittsburgh's starting rotation. In 32 games (18 starts) for the Pirates, he had a 9–7 record and a 3.26 ERA. Again used as a reliever in the playoffs, he made two appearances in the 1972 NLCS, earning the win in Game 3 by pitching 1 1/3 scoreless innings over the Cincinnati Reds. However, the Reds would win the series over the Pirates in five games.

Shoulder troubles continued to plague Kison in 1973, and he started the season on the 21–day disabled list. Sent to Charleston to get used to pitching again, Kison was optimistic after throwing against the Pirates in a charity benefit game on July 3: "I definitely think I can come back this season." In 20 starts at Charleston, he had an 8–6 record and a 4.66 ERA. Kison was called back up in September and, in his first start back on September 1, threw eight shutout innings in a no-decision, 1–0 Pirate victory over the Chicago Cubs. He would make seven starts for the Pirates to finish the year, going 3–0 with a 3.09 ERA.

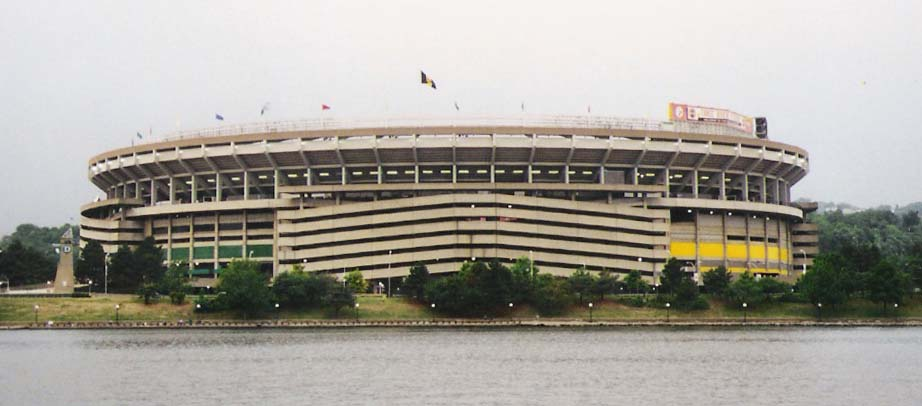
Three Rivers Stadium was where Kison's home games occurred during his nine years with the Pirates.

Hoping to help his shoulder troubles out, the Pirates had Kison work with Don Osborn in the offseason. With Osborn's help, Kison adopted a three-quarter delivery instead of the sidearm approached, which gave him better control and relieved tension on his shoulder. He was back on the Pirates' roster in 1974, but in the bullpen; supposedly, Pirates' manager Danny Murtaugh wanted to protect Kison's arm from the early-season cold weather. He joined the Pirates' rotation on May 23, replacing Moose, who moved to the bullpen. After going 0–2 in three starts with a 6.28 ERA, though, he went back to the bullpen in favor of Larry Demery. He rejoined the rotation July 14, though, and stayed in it for most of the rest of the year. The 1974 season saw Kison set what would be a career-high in games (40, only 16 of which were starts). He had a 9–8 record and a 3.49 ERA, though blister problems during the year started affecting him in the sixth inning of his starts. Pittsburgh won the NL East, and Kison started Game 3 of the NLCS against the Los Angeles Dodgers, pitching 6 2/3 shutout innings in Pittsburgh's 7–0 victory. The win was Pittsburgh's lone victory of the series, as the Dodgers defeated them in four games.

In 1975, Kison was the third starter for the Pirates. Through July 17, he had a 9–4 record and a 3.23 ERA. After that, he lost seven starts in a row before getting moved to the bullpen at the end of August. In one of those losses, on August 17 to Cincinnati, Kison allowed Pete Rose's 2,500th career hit. While in the bullpen, he snapped his losing streak on August 31 in a 9–6 victory over the Houston Astros. Used as a starter again in September, he won two more games, finishing the year with a 12–11 record and a 3.23 ERA in 33 games (29 starts). He had more walks (92) than strikeouts (89) on the season. The Pirates reached the playoffs again, but Kison made no starts for them, his lone appearance in the series coming in relief of Game 2 of the NLCS, as the Pirates were swept in three games by the Reds. The relief appearance snapped a streak of 20 1/3 scoreless innings in the playoffs for Kison.

Kison was the Pirates' number two starter in 1976, behind Doc Medich. After posting an ERA close to 6.00 in his first five starts, he changed his position on the mound. "I used to pitch from the third-base side of the rubber. My fastball was tailing away from left-handed hitters. The good ones were taking the pitch because it wasn’t a strike.” Through August 20, he had a 9–8 record. Then, on August 25, he threw a complete-game shutout against the Padres, the first of six wins in a row for him. In 1976, Kison posted the best numbers of his career. He had the most wins (14, with 9 losses) and his lowest ERA (3.08).

Once again, Kison was the Pirates' number two starter in 1977, this time behind Jerry Reuss. On July 8, Kison hit Mike Schmidt with a pitch during a game. Schmidt charged the mound, started a fight, and broke a finger, while Kison escaped without injury. He was bothered by a hangnail that year and tried numerous remedies to alleviate it, even resorting to fan mail suggestions such as packing it in salt and ice—"It gave me frostbite," was how he described the effectiveness of that remedy. The nail trouble made it difficult for him to throw his fastball and slider, and he had to rely more on slower pitches, which limited his effectiveness. He had a losing record for the first time in his career in 1977, going 9–10 as his ERA ascended to 4.90, well below the league average. He summarized his season, "It was not an exceptionally good year." However, Kison did have a career-high 122 strikeouts that season.

The Pirates' additions of Bert Blyleven and Don Robinson relegated Kison to the bullpen for the first time since 1974. His first start of the season did not come until July 17, but it was not until the middle of August that he got back into the rotation regularly. From August 17 through the end of the season, he had a 4–3 record and a 2.50 ERA in seven starts. He finished the season with a 6–6 record and a 3.19 ERA in 28 games (11 starts).

Though not expected to make the rotation in 1979, Kison began the year as a starter after Reuss was traded. He had a 1–1 record and a 3.94 ERA in his first six games, but in the middle of May, he lost his rotation spot to Ed Whitson. Moving to the bullpen, he had an 0.84 ERA in six games. Then, on June 3, Don Robinson had trouble warming up, and Kison had to make a spot start against the Padres; the start would be one of the best of his career. He pitched a one-hitter against the Padres, losing his no-hit bid when San Diego's Barry Evans doubled down the left field line with two out in the eighth. The Pirates won 7–0. After the game, Kison complained publicly about Charley Feeney and Dan Donovan's decision to give Evans a double; the incident led to the resignation of both Feeney and Donovan, and a new policy by Pittsburgh newspapers that their sportswriters would not serve as official scorers. He had another memorable game against San Diego on August 26, when he hit a grand slam against Bob Shirley in a 7–0 victory. From July 6 through the end of the year, he had a 9–3 record and a 2.93 ERA, finishing up with a 13–7 record and a 3.19 ERA. His most important start of the season came in the Pirates' last game of the year, a contest against the Cubs that had been scheduled because of an earlier tie against the New York Mets; the game was needed to determine whether the Pirates needed to play a tie-breaker against the Montreal Expos. Kison allowed one run over six innings, winning the game and the NL East pennant for the Pirates. "This is the most emotional situation I’ve ever been in, because we had to work so hard to get there,” Kison said about returning to the playoffs. “Other years we ran away with it, but not this year. And it’s even more meaningful because the last two years we played our hearts out and came up empty.”

Because Kison started the final game of the season, he did not make an appearance in the NLCS against the Reds, which the Pirates won in three games. He was the Pirates' choice for Game 1 of the World Series, which was postponed for a day because of snow at Memorial Stadium. Kison struggled in the game, giving up five runs in less than an inning in a 5–4 loss to the Orioles, his only loss in his postseason career. Developing forearm trouble during the game (perhaps because of the cold weather), Kison did not pitch again in the series, his rotation spot for Game 5 taken by Jim Rooker. However, he earned his second World Series ring as the Pirates defeated the Orioles in seven games. After the season, he became a free agent.

=== California Angels (1980–1984) and Boston Red Sox (1985) ===
Multiple teams were interested in Kison over the offseason. Rich Gossage, closer and future Hall of Famer for the New York Yankees, tried to convince Kison to sign with his team, while the California Angels needed a replacement for Nolan Ryan, who had signed with the Houston Astros. Angels' general manager Buzzie Bavasi said that the team could replace Ryan with a couple of 8–7 pitchers. Both teams were reported to offer over $2 million, and Kison ultimately chose the Angels, signing a five-year contract with them.

Kison opened 1980 as the number two starter in the Angels' rotation (behind Dave Frost). He had a second no-hit bid broken up in the ninth on April 23. With his team leading the Minnesota Twins 17–0 at Metropolitan Stadium, Kison had the no-hit bid broken up by a Ken Landreaux double with one out; the hit was the only one Kison would allow. A nerve problem in his pitching elbow limited him to one game after June 11, and he finished the year 3–6 with a 4.91 ERA in 13 games (all starts). The elbow injury required surgery; Kison was so embarrassed at being unable to fully fulfill his contract, he went to Bavasi and tried to give the money back.

Initially, Kison complained of paralysis in his hand and a lack of feeling in three of his fingers after undergoing surgery on his ulnar nerve. Though the injury jeopardized his career, he managed to return to the Angels' bullpen in August 1981. In September, he was used for four starts. In 11 games (four starts), he had a 1–1 record and a 3.48 ERA.

Entering 1982, Kison was the fifth starter in the Angels' rotation. He won his first four decisions of the year and had a 2.06 ERA through May 25, then had a 6.75 ERA over his next five starts. After Johnny Grubb of the Texas Rangers hit a line drive off his shin on June 22, the Angels moved Kison to the bullpen in favor of Dave Goltz. Used as a reliever for much of the rest of the season, he did not rejoin the rotation until September 14, but when he did, it was similar to the time he rejoined the Pirates' rotation in 1979. Kison threw nine shutout innings in a 7–0 victory over the Chicago White Sox, then held on to his rotation spot for the remainder of the year. He finished the season 10–5 with a 3.17 ERA in 33 games (16 starts) and made the playoffs for the sixth time as the Angels won the American League West. Tabbed to start in Game 2 of the ALCS against the Milwaukee Brewers, Kison allowed two runs over nine innings in a 4–2 Angel victory. He also started Game 5, giving up two runs (one earned) in five innings and leaving with the Angels ahead, but the Brewers came back and won 4–3 to win the Series in five games.

In 1983, Kison was the Opening Day starter for the Angels, the first time in his 13 seasons he got a chance to start his team's first game of the year. His season started strong, as he won six of his first seven decisions. He missed a month from May 27 to June 27, then was moved to the bullpen in August after posting an 8.31 ERA in July. Shut down in September with injuries, he had surgery on September 26 to repair a herniated disk in his back; manager John McNamara feared his career was over. In 26 games (17 starts), he had an 11–5 record and a 4.05 ERA.

Kison's career was not over; though he spent the beginning of 1984 on the disabled list, he returned to the team on June 13 as a reliever. In August, he rejoined the team's rotation after Geoff Zahn had surgery on bone chips in his knee. In 20 games (seven starts), he had a 4–5 record and a 5.37 ERA, the highest of his career. After the season, he became a free agent.

Kison joined the Boston Red Sox in 1985, rejoining McNamara, who had managed him the previous two seasons with the Angels. He began the year in Boston's starting rotation but pulled a hamstring and went on the disabled list after his first start. He returned to the rotation in May, then was moved to the bullpen at the end of June after relinquishing six runs in three starts in a row. In 22 games (9 starts), he had a 5–3 record and a 4.11 ERA. McNamara praised the veteran Kison's influence on Boston's young pitchers. Diagnosed with a torn rotator cuff, he retired after the season. "I think what I will miss most is the competitiveness of the game," Kison said upon retiring. "I’ll also miss the camaraderie of my teammates.”

During a 15-year career, Kison compiled 115 wins with 88 losses, 1,073 strikeouts, and a 3.66 ERA. In postseason games, he had a 5–1 record with 27 strikeouts and a 1.98 ERA in 36 1/3 innings.

=== Coaching ===
Following his playing career, Kison rejoined the Pirates as a minor league pitching instructor. He later spent time as the Kansas City Royals' bullpen coach (1992–93), the Royals' pitching coach (1994–98), and the Baltimore Orioles' pitching coach (1999). He was later a scout for the Orioles for more than ten years, retiring after the 2017 season.

=== Pitching style ===
Kison threw a fastball, a hard slider, and offspeed pitches, though he was at his best when he could rely on the fastball and slider. When he first reached the major leagues, he had a sidearm delivery. However, after he battled injuries from 1971 through 1973, he changed to a three-quarter delivery, which gave him better control and relieved pressure on his shoulder. He was not a strikeout pitcher; in a 15-season career, he only had more than 100 strikeouts three times in a season, and in 1975, he had more walks (92) than strikeouts (89). Despite that, Kison had an ERA above the league average most years, and he finished his career with more than a hundred more innings pitched (1809 2/3) than hits allowed (1693). He tended to hit a lot of batters in his career; once, in the minor leagues, he hit seven in a game. Pat Jordan of Sports Illustrated attributed the hit-by-pitches to a late-breaking fastball and the need to throw inside pitches to keep his curveball effective.

According to sportswriter Jon Bois, Kison and Pedro Martínez are the only two pitchers to have batters charge the mound at them four times during their careers.

== Personal life ==
Kison married the former Anna Marie Orlando after Game 7 of the 1971 World Series, flying straight from the game to the wedding in a helicopter and a Learjet. The couple had two children, Robbie and Jennifer. During his time with the Pirates, Kison became good friends with Rich Gossage. Some of Kison's hobbies were hunting and fishing. In the early morning of June 2, 2018, Kison died at age 68 after a battle with cancer.

Preceded by Guy Hansen	Kansas City Royals Pitching Coach; 1994–1998	Succeeded by Mark Wiley
Preceded by Mike Flanagan	Baltimore Orioles Pitching Coach; 1999	Succeeded by Sammy Ellis
