= Charlie Sands =

Charlie Sands may refer to:

- Charlie Sands (baseball) (1947–2016), former Major League Baseball catcher/designated hitter
- Charlie Sands (ice hockey) (1911–1953), NHL ice hockey right winger
- Charles Sands (1865–1945), American golfer and tennis player
