= Luke Walker =

American baseball player (born 1943)

James Walker
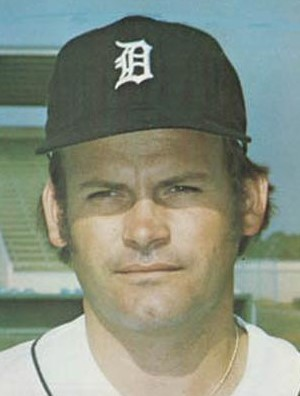
- Pitcher
- Born: September 2, 1943 (age 81); DeKalb, Texas, U.S.
- Batted: Left Threw: Left

MLB debut
- September 7, 1965, for the Pittsburgh Pirates

Last MLB appearance
- October 1, 1974, for the Detroit Tigers

MLB statistics
- Win–loss record: 45–47
- Earned run average: 3.65
- Strikeouts: 558
- Stats at Baseball Reference

Teams
- Pittsburgh Pirates (1965–1966, 1968–1973); Detroit Tigers (1974)

Career highlights and awards
- World Series champion (1971)

James Luke Walker (born September 2, 1943) is an American former pitcher in Major League Baseball who played between 1965 and 1974 for the Pittsburgh Pirates (1965–66, 1968–73) and Detroit Tigers (1974). He batted and threw left-handed.

Walker started and filled various relief roles coming out from the bullpen as a closer, middle reliever, and set-up man as well. His most productive season statistically came in 1970 with Pittsburgh, when he finished 15–6 (3–1, three saves in relief), while his 3.04 ERA, .714 winning percentage, and 7.1 hits per nine innings all ranked him third among National League pitchers. He also fired a pair of two-hit shutouts. That year, the Pirates won the National League East title for their first post-season berth since winning the 1960 World Series. However, they were swept by the Cincinnati Reds in the NLCS. Walker was the losing pitcher in Game Two, giving up two runs (one unearned) in seven innings in a 3–1 Reds victory. Bobby Tolan scored all three Reds runs, including a home run off Walker in the fifth inning.

In 1971, Walker went 10–8 with a 3.55 ERA for the 1971 World Series champion Pirates. On July 18 of that year, in the second game of a doubleheader against the Los Angeles Dodgers at Three Rivers Stadium, he had a no-hitter broken up by a Joe Ferguson home run (the first of Ferguson's Major League career) with no outs in the ninth. The hit was the only one he would allow in a 7–1 Pittsburgh victory. In Game Four of that year's World Series, which the Pirates won in seven games over the Baltimore Orioles, Walker threw the first pitch in a night game in World Series history. His outing was brief: Paul Blair, Mark Belanger and Merv Rettenmund began the game with consecutive singles off Walker to load the bases. After Blair scored on a passed ball, Walker intentionally walked Frank Robinson to re-load the bases. He was then pulled after giving up consecutive sacrifice flies to Brooks Robinson and Boog Powell for a 3–0 Baltimore lead. Walker was then taken out of the game. The Pirates later scored two runs in the bottom of the first, the tying run in the third, and the go-ahead run (the game ended by that 4–3 score) in the seventh, and Bruce Kison threw 6 1/3 scoreless innings in relief of Walker. The Orioles got only one hit after Walker's departure, a Blair double off Kison in the second.

On New Year's Eve, 1972, Walker was helping Roberto Clemente packing supplies on the plane for the relief trip to Nicaragua that claimed Clemente's life. He had requested to join Clemente on the trip; Clemente told him to enjoy the San Juan nightlife instead, saving his life.

Walker's contract was sold by the Pirates to the Tigers at the Winter Meetings on December 5, 1973.

In a nine-season career, Walker posted a 45–47 record with a 3.65 ERA and 558 strikeouts in 243 appearances, including 100 starts, 16 complete games, seven shutouts, nine saves, and 824 2/3 innings pitched. He was also a weak batsman, garnering only 11 hits in 188 at-bats for an .059 batting average. According to former Pirate great Steve Blass during one of Hank Aaron's last appearances at Pittsburgh's Three Rivers Stadium, Luke hit a rare single. The ball was fielded and thrown to first base where Aaron was positioned. The home crowd erupted in cheers, which Aaron mistakenly assumed were for him, as is common even in road games when great players make their final plays. So Aaron doffed his cap to acknowledge the adulation. But the crowd was actually cheering Walker, who turned to Aaron and said "Put your hat on Hank, they're cheering for me"..
