= Dock Ellis =

American baseball player (1945–2008)

- Ellis with the Pirates
- Pitcher
- Born: March 11, 1945; Los Angeles, California, U.S.
- Died: December 19, 2008 (aged 63); Los Angeles, California, U.S.
- Batted: Switch Threw: Right

MLB debut
- June 18, 1968, for the Pittsburgh Pirates

Last MLB appearance
- September 29, 1979, for the Pittsburgh Pirates

MLB statistics
- Win–loss record: 138–119
- Earned run average: 3.46
- Strikeouts: 1,136
- Stats at Baseball Reference

Teams
- Pittsburgh Pirates (1968–1975); New York Yankees (1976–1977); Oakland Athletics (1977); Texas Rangers (1977–1979); New York Mets (1979); Pittsburgh Pirates (1979)

Career highlights and awards
- All-Star (1971); World Series champion (1971); Pitched a no-hitter on June 12, 1970

Dock Phillip Ellis Jr. (March 11, 1945 – December 19, 2008) was an American professional baseball player. He played in Major League Baseball as a right-handed pitcher from 1968 through 1979, most notably as a member of the Pittsburgh Pirates teams that won five National League Eastern Division titles in six years between 1970 and 1975 and won the World Series in 1971. Ellis also played for the New York Yankees, Oakland Athletics, Texas Rangers and New York Mets. In his MLB career, Ellis accumulated a 138–119 (.537) record, a 3.46 earned run average, and 1,136 strikeouts.

Ellis threw a no-hitter on June 12, 1970, and later stated that he accomplished the feat while under the influence of LSD. Ellis was the starting pitcher for the National League in the All-Star Game in 1971. Joining the Yankees in 1976, he helped lead the team to the American League pennant, and was named the Sporting News Comeback Player of the Year Award.

Ellis was an outspoken advocate for the rights of players and African Americans.

He had a substance abuse problem, and acknowledged after his retirement that he had never pitched without the use of drugs. After going into treatment, Ellis remained sober and devoted the remainder of his life to counseling others with substance use disorder in treatment centers and prisons. He died of a liver ailment at age 63 in 2008.

== Early life ==
Born in Los Angeles, California, Ellis attended Gardena High School in Gardena. At age 14, he began drinking alcohol and using drugs.

Ellis played for the school's basketball team, recording 21 assists in one game. He played baseball as an infielder for a local semi-professional team called the Pittsburgh Pirates Rookies, along with future major leaguers Willie Crawford, Bill Rohr, Tom Harrison, Bobby Tolan, Roy White, Ron Woods, Reggie Smith, Don Wilson, Bob Watson and Dave Nelson. The team was managed by Chet Brewer. However, Ellis refused to play for the Gardena High School baseball team because a baseball player referred to him as a "spearchucker".

When Ellis was caught drinking and smoking marijuana in a high school bathroom during his senior year, the school agreed not to expel him if he agreed to play for the school's baseball team. He appeared in four games and was named all-league. Ellis then attended Los Angeles Harbor College (LAHC), a junior college.

Ellis was diagnosed with sickle cell anemia at age 17; the diagnosis was later changed to sickle cell trait.

== Playing career ==
=== Minor league career (1964–1968) ===
While Ellis attended LAHC, various Major League Baseball teams attempted to sign him to a professional contract, but as he heard the Pittsburgh Pirates gave out signing bonuses of $60,000, he held out until the Pirates made him an offer. He was arrested for stealing a car, and given probation. Brewer, working as a scout for the Pirates, signed Ellis to the Pirates; as a result of the arrest, the Pirates offered Ellis $500 a month and a $2,500 signing bonus.

Ellis played for the Batavia Pirates of the Class A New York–Pennsylvania League in 1964. The next season, he played for the Kinston Eagles of the Class A Carolina League and the Columbus Jets of the Class AAA International League. Ellis pitched in an exhibition game for the Pirates against the Cleveland Indians in July, earning the win. After the season, the Pirates added Ellis to their 40-man roster.

In 1966, Ellis played for the Asheville Tourists of the Class AA Southern League, pitching to a 10–9 win–loss record, a 2.77 earned run average (ERA), and an All-Star Game appearance. The Pirates called Ellis up to the majors near the end of the season, but the team did not use him in a game that year.

Ellis started the 1967 season with Columbus. He believed that he was not on the major league club because the Pirates already had a number of African American players; he felt that the team did not want to alienate white fans. Ellis was sent down to the Macon Peaches of the Southern League, which Ellis believed was because of the length of his hair. Ellis said that he was promoted back to Columbus after shaving his head. He had a 2–0 win–loss record with Macon and a 5–7 record with Columbus.

During his minor league career, Ellis once chased a heckler in the stands with a baseball bat. He also used pills when he pitched, specifically the amphetamines Benzedrine and Dexamyl. Stressed by the pressure of his "can't-miss" status as a prospect, Ellis became addicted. He later said that he never pitched a game without using amphetamines. He eventually needed 70 to 85 milligrams (1.08–1.31 gr) per game, or between five and twelve capsules, depending on their strength. Ellis acknowledged that he began to use cocaine in the late 1960s.

Ellis held out from the Pirates in February 1968; he came to terms with the team in March. The Pirates optioned Ellis to Columbus, who moved Ellis from the starting rotation to the bullpen. At Columbus, Ellis credited his work with manager Johnny Pesky and pitching coach Harvey Haddix for improving his performance.

=== Pittsburgh Pirates ===
Ellis made his MLB debut in June 1968, beginning as a relief pitcher, but the Pirates moved Ellis into the starting rotation later that season and he started 10 games. Ellis pitched his first complete game in September. He had a 6–5 win–loss record with a 2.51 ERA with the Pirates in 1968. In 1969, Ellis made the team's starting rotation for Opening Day. The struggles of Steve Blass kept Ellis in the starting rotation, as Blass was moved to the bullpen.

==== June 12, 1970 no-hitter ====
On June 12, 1970, Ellis no-hit the San Diego Padres, 2–0, in the first game of a twi-night doubleheader at San Diego Stadium, while reportedly under the influence of LSD. After the Pirates had flown to San Diego on Thursday, June 11, Ellis visited a friend in Los Angeles and used LSD "two or three times". Thinking it was still Thursday, he took a hit of LSD on Friday at noon, and his friend's girlfriend reminded him at 2:00 p.m. that he was scheduled to pitch that night. Ellis flew from Los Angeles to San Diego at 3:00 p.m. and arrived at the stadium at 4:30 p.m.; the game started at 6:05 p.m.

Ellis said that he threw the no-hitter despite being unable to feel the ball or see the batter or catcher clearly. He also said that his catcher Jerry May wore reflective tape on his fingers, which helped Ellis see May's signals. Ellis walked eight batters (tied (Note: Tied with Johnny Vander Meer (1938), Cliff Chambers (1951), Nolan Ryan (1974), and Edwin Jackson (2010).) for the third most all time by a pitcher in a solo no-hitter) and struck out six, and he was aided by excellent fielding plays by second baseman Bill Mazeroski and centerfielder Matty Alou.

As Ellis recounted:

I can only remember bits and pieces of the game. I was psyched. I had a feeling of euphoria. I was zeroed in on the [catcher's] glove, but I didn't hit the glove too much. I remember hitting a couple of batters, and the bases were loaded two or three times. The ball was small sometimes, the ball was large sometimes, sometimes I saw the catcher, sometimes I didn't. Sometimes, I tried to stare the hitter down and throw while I was looking at him. I chewed my gum until it turned to powder. They say I had about three to four fielding chances. I remember diving out of the way of a ball I thought was a line drive. I jumped, but the ball wasn't hit hard and never reached me.

Ellis reported that he never used LSD during the season again, though he continued to use amphetamines. After the story was made public, Ellis said that he regretted taking LSD that day because it "robbed him of his greatest professional memory".

==== Assessments of LSD claim ====
Bob Smizik of the Pittsburgh Press, who first broke the story in 1984, believes Ellis' version of events that day, although Smizik did not witness the game in person. Bill Christine, also of the Pittsburgh Press, does not believe Ellis' claim and was at the game that day. Christine was a beat reporter who "practically lived with the team that year". Christine had said that he did not notice anything unusual and that if Ellis had reported to the stadium only 90 minutes before his scheduled start, reporters would have been told. John Mehno, a reporter who had "extensive interactions" with Ellis over his career, was skeptical about many stories told by Ellis, including the LSD no-hitter. Mehno said that he has not found a teammate who would corroborate the story. However, Ellis' close friend Scipio Spinks, a pitcher for the Houston Astros, has said that he has no doubt that Ellis was telling the truth about his LSD use, as he was very familiar with Ellis' drug habits, including the use of LSD.

==== The no-hitter in pop culture ====
Ellis collaborated with future United States Poet Laureate Donald Hall on a book, Dock Ellis in the Country of Baseball, published in 1976. The first edition of the book reported that Ellis had been drinking vodka on the day of his no-hitter. Hall updated the 1989 edition to reveal the LSD use. Singer-songwriter Barbara Manning paid tribute to Ellis and his no-hitter in the psychedelic pop song "Dock Ellis", as did folk singer Todd Snider with "America's Favorite Pastime" on his 2009 album The Excitement Plan. "Dock Ellis" is also a song by beatmaker Blazo and hip-hop duo The 49ers that talks about "musical addiction". A 2009 animated short film by James Blagden about the game, Dock Ellis and the LSD No-No, features narration in Ellis' own voice, taken from a 2008 NPR interview. The no-hitter is featured in the documentary about Ellis' life, No No: A Dockumentary (2014), directed by Jeffrey Radice. Robin Williams riffed on Ellis and his no-hitter as part of a segment on performance-enhancing drugs in sports, during his 2009 HBO special Weapons of Self-Destruction. In a season 2 episode of Poker Face, a player laces another's gum with LSD in an attempt at sabotage, but inadvertently "Dock Ellis-ed him."

==== 1970–1971 ====
Ellis struggled for the remainder of the 1970 season, and finished the year with a 13–10 win–loss record as he experienced elbow and shoulder pain. However, he finished second in the NL with four shutouts and seventh with a 3.21 ERA. The Pirates won the National League (NL) East division championship. Ellis started Game 1 of the 1970 National League Championship Series (NLCS) to the Cincinnati Reds. Ellis matched zeroes with Reds' starter Gary Nolan through nine innings, but was touched up for three runs in the top of the tenth, receiving a tough-luck 3-0 loss. The Pirates lost the series to the Reds in a three game sweep.

Ellis worked on his changeup for the 1971 season. He was rewarded by being named the Pirates' Opening Day starting pitcher; he defeated the Philadelphia Phillies by a score of 4–2. After a strong start to the 1971 season, posting a 13–3 win–loss record, Ellis was named to appear in the 1971 Major League Baseball All-Star Game, held at Tiger Stadium in Detroit. The AL selected Vida Blue of the Oakland Athletics as their starter, and Ellis publicly stated that National League All-Star Team manager Sparky Anderson would "never start two brothers against each other". Anderson surprised Ellis by naming him the starting pitcher of the All-Star Game. Ellis was the losing pitcher in the game. During the game, Reggie Jackson hit a towering home run off of Ellis. The home run, estimated to have traveled 600 feet (180 m), tied a 1926 home run hit by Babe Ruth for the longest measured home run on record. The next time the two opposed each other, Ellis beaned Jackson in the face in retaliation for his earlier home run.

Ellis started Game 2 of the 1971 NLCS, earning the victory over the San Francisco Giants. During the series, Ellis created a stir by complaining about the Pirates' lodgings, complaining that the organization was "cheap". He changed hotels because he said the hotel rooms were too small. Ellis started Game 1 of the 1971 World Series against the Baltimore Orioles. In a losing effort, he lasted only 2 1/3 innings. He allowed four hits and four runs, including two home runs. Though Ellis denied being in pain before the game, he later acknowledged that elbow pain limited his performance, and wondered if his sickle cell trait could be related to this pain. The Pirates defeated the Orioles in seven games to win the World Series.

Ellis finished the season with a 19–9 win–loss record and a 3.06 ERA. He placed fourth in the Cy Young Award balloting. His 19 wins were fifth best in the league, and his .679 winning percentage was fourth best.

==== Macing incident ====
On May 5, 1972, Ellis, Willie Stargell, and Rennie Stennett missed the team bus to Riverfront Stadium. A security guard asked the three for identification; Stargell and Stennett complied and were allowed in, but Ellis did not have identification with him. The guard said that Ellis did not identify himself, appeared drunk, and "made threatening gestures with a clenched fist." Ellis showed his World Series ring as evidence of his affiliation with the Pirates, but in response, the guard maced Ellis. Ellis was arrested and charged with disorderly conduct.

The Reds sued Ellis for assault and Ellis countersued. Before going to trial, the Reds dropped the suit and wrote Ellis a letter of apology. The municipal court dropped the charges against Ellis, though Ellis stated that this incident made him "hate better".

Ellis finished the 1972 season ninth in the NL in ERA (2.70), sixth in winning percentage (.682), fourth in walks per nine innings pitched (1.818) and first in home runs per nine innings ratio (0.331). The Pirates won the NL East that year and faced the Reds in the 1972 NLCS. Knowing he had a sore arm, the Pirates started Ellis in game 4 anyway; he threw five innings and was charged with three runs, none of them earned, and took the loss. The Reds won the best of five series in five games.

==== 1973 ====
Ellis said that the scariest moment of his career was when he attempted to pitch while sober in a 1973 game. During pregame warmups, he could not recreate his pitching mechanics. Ellis went to his locker, took some amphetamines with coffee, and returned to pitch.

In August 1973, pictures circulated of Ellis wearing hair curlers in the bullpen during pregame warmups. The Pirates told him not to wear curlers on the field again. Ellis agreed, but charged that the Pirates were displaying racism. Ebony devoted a spread to Ellis about his hairstyles, which was inspired by the hair-curler incident.

After Ellis defeated the Reds in a 1973 game, Joe Morgan claimed that Ellis had thrown a spitball. Anderson had the umpire check Ellis, but found no evidence. In his 1980 book, Ellis admitted that wearing hair curlers produced sweat on his hair, which he used to throw a modified version of a spitball.

Ellis missed most of the last month of the season because of tendinitis in his elbow, and the Pirates lost the division to the New York Mets. Ellis again led the league in home runs allowed per nine innings pitched ratio (0.328).

==== 1974 ====
Ellis attempted to hit every batter in the Cincinnati Reds lineup with a pitch on May 1, 1974, as he was angry that the Pirates were intimidated by the Big Red Machine. Ellis admired Pete Rose and was concerned about how he would respond, but Ellis decided to do it regardless. Ellis hit Rose, Joe Morgan, and Dan Driessen in the top of the first inning, with his first six pitches all aimed at the batters. With the bases loaded, Ellis attempted to throw strikes to cleanup hitter Tony Pérez but walked him, forcing home a run. After Ellis aimed two pitches at the head of Johnny Bench, he was removed from the game by manager Danny Murtaugh. Ellis' box score for the game reads as follows: 0 IP, 0 H, 1 R, 1 ER, 1 BB, 0 K. Ellis tied eight other players for the MLB record with the three hit batsmen in the inning.

Ellis struggled at the start of the 1974 season, with a 3–8 win–loss record and 4.54 ERA through July 10. He then won eight consecutive games and nine out of ten, pitching seven complete games in that ten-game stretch. A line drive off the bat of Willie Montañez fractured the fifth metacarpal bone in Ellis' pitching hand on September 10, prematurely ending his season. Ellis had the seventh-best walks plus hits per inning pitched ratio (1.155) that season. The Pirates won the NL East but lost the 1974 NLCS, three games to one, to the Los Angeles Dodgers.

==== 1975 ====
Healthy to begin the 1975 season, Ellis continued to perform well. In August, the Pirates asked Ellis to pitch in the bullpen; he refused on consecutive nights. On August 15, 1975, Ellis refused assignment to the bullpen again; as a result, the Pirates suspended him for one day. Ellis called for a team meeting the next day, at which he was expected to apologize. Instead, he berated Murtaugh, who responded by cursing at Ellis, ordering the pitcher out of the clubhouse and attempting to fight him. Reportedly, coach Don Leppert also tried to fight Ellis. The Pirates suspended Ellis for 30 days and fined him $2,000 ($11,967 in 2025). The suspension was lifted on August 30 when Ellis apologized to Murtaugh.

Ellis finished with an 8–9 record and 3.79 ERA during the 1975 season. The Pirates again won the NL East, but were swept by the Reds in the 1975 NLCS in three games. Ellis pitched in relief for two innings in Game 1.

=== New York Yankees ===
Ellis sensed that he would be traded that offseason due to the fallout from his suspension. On December 11, Ellis was traded to the New York Yankees of the American League (AL) along with pitcher Ken Brett and top infield prospect Willie Randolph, in exchange for pitcher Doc Medich. Tired of Ellis' behavior, Pittsburgh general manager Joe L. Brown insisted that the Yankees take Ellis as part of the deal.

With the Yankees, Ellis pitched to a 17–8 win–loss record with a 3.15 ERA during the 1976 regular season. His 17 wins were eighth in the AL, while his .680 winning percentage was third best. After the season, he was voted the AL Comeback Player of the Year by the United Press International.

The Yankees won the AL East division championship in 1976. Ellis started in Game 3 of the 1976 American League Championship Series (ALCS), getting the win. The Yankees reached the 1976 World Series. Ellis started Game 3 but received the loss, allowing four earned runs in 3 1/3 innings. The Reds defeated the Yankees in four games.

=== Oakland Athletics and Texas Rangers ===
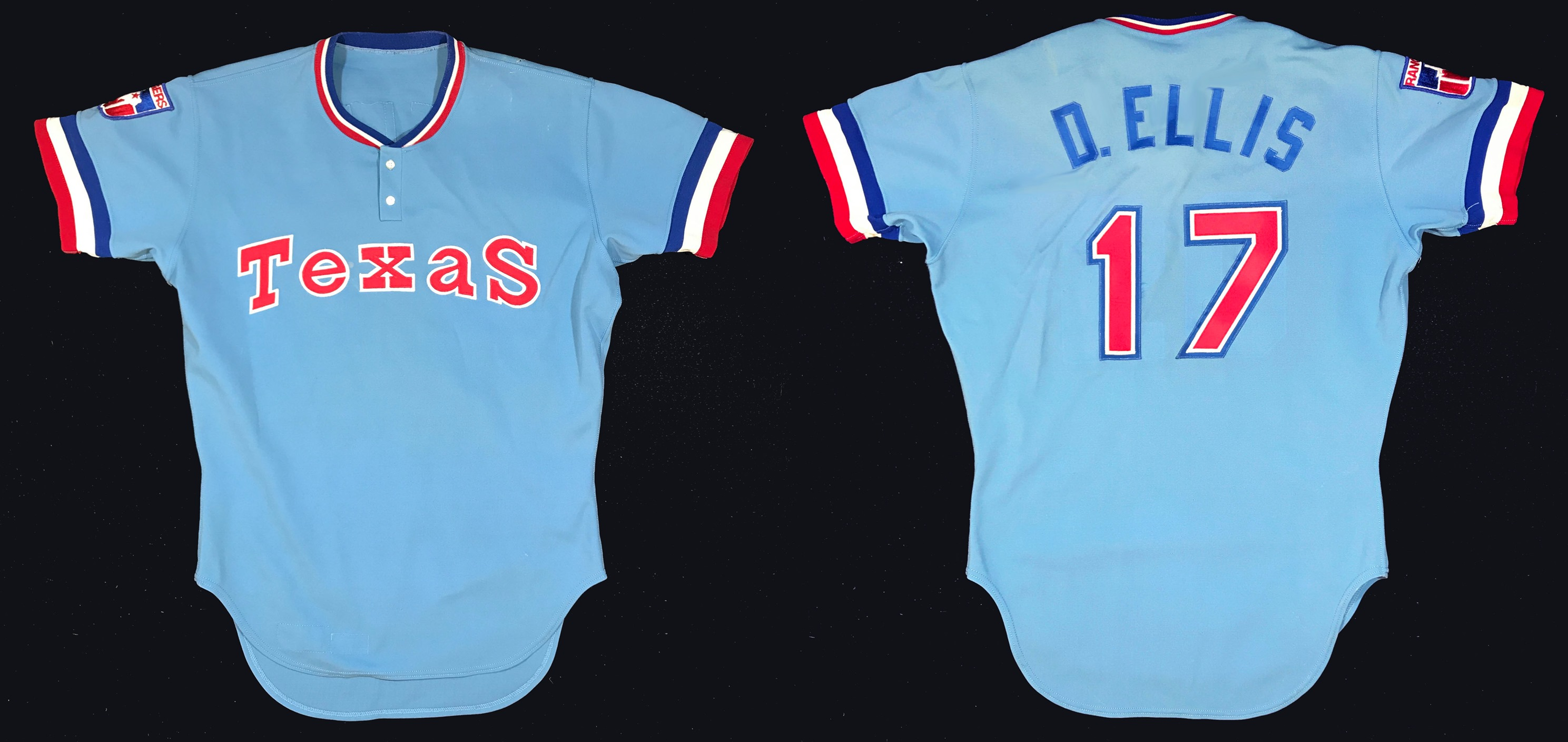
Texas Rangers 1979 Dock Ellis #17 road jersey

Before the 1977 season, Ellis publicly criticized Yankees owner George Steinbrenner for giving him a raise that was inadequate given his 1976 performance and for interfering with manager Billy Martin. As Ellis refused to sign his contract, and the Yankees did not want to have players who could become free agents, the Yankees traded Ellis with Larry Murray and Marty Perez to the Oakland Athletics for Mike Torrez in April 1977. Torrez emerged as a top starting pitcher for the Yankees that season, while Ellis struggled. While pitching for Oakland, the team asked him to keep charts. Defiant, Ellis set the charts on fire in the clubhouse, setting off sprinklers. Ellis ranked this as the "craziest" thing he did during his career.

On June 15, 1977, the Rangers purchased Ellis from the Oakland Athletics. Ellis had a resurgent second half of the 1977 season, going 10–6 with a 2.90 ERA. Ellis complained about manager Billy Hunter's liquor policy in 1978. Hunter, responding to a raucous team flight, banned liquor on team flights; Ellis vowed that he would bring liquor on the plane to Toronto anyway. Ellis led a player insurrection against Hunter's authoritarian style, declaring that Hunter "may be Hitler, but he ain't making no lampshade out of me". The Rangers organization blamed Ellis for the team's disappointing finish in 1978 and indicated that they would look to trade Ellis. However, owner Brad Corbett sided with Ellis over Hunter, firing Hunter after the season.

=== New York Mets and return to Pittsburgh ===
After starting the 1979 season with a 1–5 win–loss record, Ellis was traded to the New York Mets on June 15, 1979, for minor league pitchers Mike Bruhert and Bob Myrick. The Mets, seeking to upgrade their pitching staff due to poor performances and injuries to Pat Zachry and Skip Lockwood, acquired Andy Hassler from the Boston Red Sox on the same day. Ellis went 3–7 with a 6.04 ERA with the Mets.

Ellis requested the Mets send him back to the Pirates. Seeking more pitching in their pennant race, the Pirates purchased Ellis from the Mets on September 21, 1979, for an undisclosed sum of money; the price was later revealed to be "something in excess of the waiver price of $20,000". Ellis made three relief appearances with the Pirates that year, retiring after that season. Because he returned to the Pirates after the waiver trade deadline, he was ineligible to play in the postseason and is not considered a winner of the 1979 World Series.

Ellis finished his career with a lifetime win–loss record of 138–119 and an ERA of 3.46.

=== Pitching style ===
Ellis threw five distinct pitches: a fastball, a curveball, a changeup, a palmball, and what Ellis called a "sliding fastball". The latter pitch was distinct from a slider. Ellis trusted his catcher to call pitches, and rarely waved him off.

Ellis kept a notebook, called "The Book", with detailed information about each hitter's strengths and weaknesses. He often asked teammates and members of other teams, including pitchers Bob Gibson and Juan Marichal, for advice on how to pitch opposing batters.

== Personal life ==
Ellis was married four times. His first wife was Paula; they divorced in 1972. Ellis' second wife was Austine, and they divorced in 1980. His third wife was Jacquelyn, and the fourth was Hjordis. Ellis had three children and two grandchildren; both daughters have since died, one in 2003 due to complications arising from type 1 diabetes. Ellis had a daughter, Shangalesa, with Paula. His son with Austine, Dock Phillip Ellis III (Trey), played college basketball at California State University, Bakersfield. Trey fathered Ellis' first grandchild, Dock Phillip Ellis IV (Dru). Ellis' youngest daughter Simone, who mothered Ellis' second grandchild, died of cancer in December 2012. Ellis stopped using alcohol and other drugs in 1980, when his son was an infant.

Ellis fought for players' rights, including the right to free agency. Jackie Robinson credited him with trying to further the rights of African American players, but warned him that he said too much. In 1971, Ellis testified before the United States Senate Subcommittee on Public Health about his experiences with sickle cell anemia, and later worked with people who had the disease and raised money for sickle cell research.

== Retirement ==
Ellis retired from baseball in the spring of 1980, saying that he lost interest in the game. That year, Ellis entered drug treatment, staying for 40 days at The Meadows in Wickenburg, Arizona. In 1984, he publicly announced that he had pitched his no-hitter under the influence of LSD.

Ellis lived in Apple Valley, California. He worked in Victorville, California as a drug counselor. He also counseled prisoners in Pittsburgh and at a prison in Adelanto, California. The Yankees hired Ellis in the 1980s to work with their minor league players, including Pascual Perez, whom he counseled for drug problems. In 2005, Ellis began teaching weekly classes for individuals convicted of driving under the influence. Ellis also appeared in the 1986 film Gung Ho, directed by Ron Howard.

In 1989, Ellis served as player/coach for the St. Petersburg Pelicans of the Senior Professional Baseball Association and went 0–2 with a 1.76 ERA and seven saves as a part of the team's bullpen. In 1990, he allowed no earned runs and recorded two saves for the Pelicans before the league folded. He continued to play in the Los Angeles Veterans League.

Ellis was inducted into the Baseball Reliquary's Shrine of the Eternals in 1999.

Ellis was diagnosed with cirrhosis in 2007 and was placed on the list for a liver transplant. Although he had no health insurance, friends from his baseball career helped pay his medical bills. However, Ellis suffered heart damage in his last weeks of life, which made a transplant impossible.

Ellis died on December 19, 2008, at Los Angeles County-USC Medical Center due to his liver ailment. Services were held at the Angelus Funeral Home. He is interred at Inglewood Park Cemetery in Inglewood, California.

His life was the subject of the 2014 documentary film No No: A Dockumentary.

== See also ==
- List of Major League Baseball no-hitters

== Bibliography ==
- Hall, Donald; Ellis, Dock (1989). Dock Ellis in the Country of Baseball. Simon & Schuster. ISBN 0-671-65988-X.

== Notes ==
Awards and achievements
Preceded by Bob Moose	No-hitter pitcher June 12, 1970	Succeeded by Clyde Wright
