= Mel Wright =

American baseball player (1928–1983)

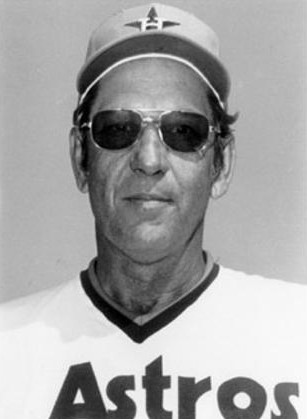
- Wright in 1976
- Pitcher
- Born: May 11, 1928; Manila, Arkansas, U.S.
- Died: May 16, 1983 (aged 55); Houston, Texas, U.S.
- Batted: Right Threw: Right

MLB debut
- April 17, 1954, for the St. Louis Cardinals

Last MLB appearance
- July 18, 1961, for the Chicago Cubs

MLB statistics
- Win–loss record: 2–4
- Earned run average: 7.61
- Strikeouts: 36
- Stats at Baseball Reference

Teams
- St. Louis Cardinals (1954–1955); Chicago Cubs (1960–1961)

Melvin James Wright Jr. (May 11, 1928 – May 16, 1983) was an American Major League Baseball pitcher, pitching coach and scout. A native of Manila, Arkansas, who attended Ouachita Baptist University, Wright threw and batted right-handed and was measured during his playing days at 6 ft 3 in (1.91 m) tall and 210 lb (95 kg).

Wright was a longtime associate of former MLB center fielder and manager Bill Virdon. Originally signed by the New York Yankees in 1950, Wright was traded with Virdon to the St. Louis Cardinals on April 11, 1954, in a multiplayer transaction that sent eventual Baseball Hall of Fame outfielder Enos Slaughter to the Yanks. But while Virdon enjoyed a decade-plus-long Major League playing tenure, Wright spent most of his pitching career at the Triple-A minor league level. In 543 minor league games, he won 85 games, losing 61 with an earned run average of 3.01.

Wright appeared in 58 games with the Cardinals (1954–55) and Chicago Cubs (1960–61), winning two of six decisions, surrendering 119 hits in 84 innings pitched, and compiling a earned run average of 7.61.

On August 15, 1955, pitcher Warren Spahn of the Milwaukee Braves hit a home run at Busch Stadium off Wright, then with the Cardinals, to give Spahn a home run in every National League park to that point.

Wright began his coaching career in 1962 with the Salt Lake City Bees of the Triple-A Pacific Coast League, then was a member of the Cubs' experimental College of Coaches in 1963–64 before becoming a Chicago scout, minor league pitching instructor, then Major League pitching coach for one season (1971) on the staff of Leo Durocher. In 1973, Virdon, then in his second and final season as manager of the Pittsburgh Pirates, named Wright as his Major League pitching coach. Virdon then appointed Wright to posts with the Yankees (1974–75, as bullpen coach), Houston Astros (1976–82) and Montreal Expos (1983).

However, Wright was suffering from cancer when Virdon asked him to join the Montreal coaching staff. He was hospitalized one week into the 1983 season and died of heart failure on May 16, in Houston, Texas, at age 55.

Preceded by Verlon Walker	Chicago Cubs pitching coach 1971	Succeeded by Larry Jansen
Preceded by Don Osborn	Pittsburgh Pirates pitching coach 1973	Succeeded by Don Osborn
Preceded by Jim Hegan	New York Yankees bullpen coach 1974–1975	Succeeded by n/a
Preceded by Roger Craig	Houston Astros pitching coach 1976–1982	Succeeded by Les Moss
