= Bob Robertson =

American baseball player (born 1946)

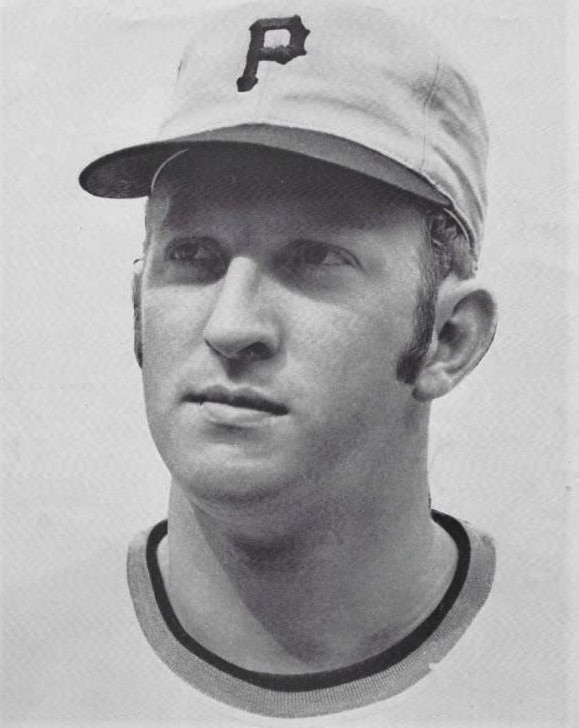
- First baseman
- Born: October 2, 1946 (age 79); Frostburg, Maryland, U.S.
- Batted: Right Threw: Right

MLB debut
- September 18, 1967, for the Pittsburgh Pirates

Last MLB appearance
- June 23, 1979, for the Toronto Blue Jays

MLB statistics
- Batting average: .242
- Home runs: 115
- Runs batted in: 368
- Stats at Baseball Reference

Teams
- Pittsburgh Pirates (1967, 1969–1976); Seattle Mariners (1978); Toronto Blue Jays (1979)

Career highlights and awards
- World Series champion (1971)

Robert Eugene Robertson (born October 2, 1946) is an American former professional baseball player. He played in Major League Baseball as a first baseman between 1967 and 1979, most notably as a member of the Pittsburgh Pirates teams that won five National League Eastern Division titles in six years between 1970 and 1975 and, won the World Series in 1971; he was the second player to hit three home runs in a playoff game. The 1971 postseason saw him hit six total home runs, the most for a postseason in the pre-Wild Card era that was matched but not surpassed for three decades. He also played for the Seattle Mariners (1978) and the Toronto Blue Jays (1979). He missed the entire 1968 season due to a kidney obstruction.

== Career ==
Robertson was touted as "another Ralph Kiner" after leading the minor leagues in home runs three times. He had brief trials with the Pittsburgh Pirates in 1967 and 1969, having missed all of the 1968 season due to a kidney obstruction.

Robertson broke into the Pirates' regular lineup in 1970, playing alongside future Hall-of-Famers Roberto Clemente, Bill Mazeroski and Willie Stargell. On August 1 of that year, at Atlanta–Fulton County Stadium, Robertson and Stargell each collected five hits in a 20-10 victory over the Atlanta Braves. Not until Andrew McCutchen and Garrett Jones in 2010 did Pirate teammates again collect five hits in the same game. That season, Robertson batted .287 with 27 home runs and 82 runs batted in (all career highs) on a team that won the National League East Division, the Pirates' first trip to the post-season since winning the 1960 World Series. However, they were defeated in the National League Championship Series by the Cincinnati Reds.

In 1971 Robertson hit .271 with 26 home runs and 72 runs batted in. That year, the Pirates defeated the San Francisco Giants in the National League Championship Series, and the Baltimore Orioles in seven games to win the World Series. In the NLCS, Robertson hit four home runs (a record later tied by Steve Garvey in 1978 and Jeffrey Leonard in 1987), three of them in the Pirates’ Game 2 victory, which was played the day after Robertson's 25th birthday. He also added a double, setting the record for most total bases in a post-season game. Robertson hit two more home runs in the World Series; one of those came in Game 3 off Baltimore starter Mike Cuellar with Clemente on second and Stargell on first. Third-base coach Frank Oceak had given Robertson the bunt sign in this at-bat, but Robertson, who had no sacrifice bunts on the season and only one the year before, missed it. Television replays showed that Clemente had appeared to call time-out just before that pitch; however, Cuellar was already in his windup at the time. Steve Blass, the winning pitcher in that Game 3, was sitting next to manager Danny Murtaugh in the Pirate dugout. The pitcher offered to pay the fine if Murtaugh imposed one on Robertson for missing the bunt sign. Murtaugh did not. He finished with six home runs, the most for a postseason run in MLB history. Lenny Dykstra was the first of various players to tie him in 1993 before the record was finally surpassed in 2002 by Troy Glaus and Barry Bonds.

In the years following the World Series title, however, Robertson slumped, hitting only .193 with 12 home runs and 41 runs batted during 1972, .239 with 14 home runs and 40 runs batted in during 1973 and .229 with 16 home runs and 48 runs batted in during 1974. After having surgery performed on both knees in 1974 he was reduced to a part-time role, averaging about 150 plate appearances in both 1975 and 1976. He hit .274 in 1975, but after compiling a .217 average in 1976, Robertson was released by Pittsburgh after the end of the 1976 season.

Robertson did not play baseball at any level during 1977. The Seattle Mariners picked him up as a free agent for the 1978 season, for whom he hit .230 as a part-time first-baseman/designated hitter in 64 games. Released again, he was signed by the Toronto Blue Jays a few weeks into the 1979 season as a backup for first baseman John Mayberry. His only home home run (and only one run batted in) as a Blue Jay, hit on April 29, was the go-ahead run in a 5-3 victory against the Milwaukee Brewers. However, Robertson was used very infrequently by the Jays, appearing in only 15 games and posting a .103 average in 29 at bats. He was released on June 27, bringing his professional playing career to a close.

== Career highlights ==
In an eleven-year major league career, Robertson played in 829 games, accumulating 578 hits in 2,385 at bats for a .242 career batting average along with 115 home runs, 368 runs batted in and a .331 on-base percentage. Defensively, he posted a career .994 fielding percentage as a first baseman and a .993 fielding percentage overall. Known for his impressive power hitting, he hit the first home run ever hit into the left-field upper deck of Three Rivers Stadium—one of only 13 upper-deck home runs in the stadium's history. His shot came off San Diego Padre pitcher Steve Arlin on July 16, 1971. Pirate announcer Bob Prince called Robertson "The Mount Savage Strongboy" and once said of him, "Robertson could hit a ball out of any park—including Yellowstone."

== Personal life ==
Robertson was born in Frostburg, Maryland on October 2, 1946, and raised in Mount Savage, Maryland where he graduated from Mount Savage High School. Robertson lives in LaVale, Maryland with his wife, Carolyn. They have seven grandchildren.
