= Charlie Sands (baseball) =

American baseball player (1947–2016)

- Catcher
- Born: December 17, 1947; Newport News, Virginia, U.S.
- Died: August 22, 2016 (aged 68); Naples, Florida, U.S.
- Batted: Left Threw: Right

MLB debut
- June 21, 1967, for the New York Yankees

Last MLB appearance
- May 8, 1975, for the Oakland Athletics

MLB statistics
- Batting average: .214
- Home runs: 6
- Runs batted in: 23
- Stats at Baseball Reference

Teams
- New York Yankees (1967); Pittsburgh Pirates (1971–1972); California Angels (1973–1974); Oakland Athletics (1975)

Career highlights and awards
- World Series champion (1971)

Charles Duane Sands (December 17, 1947 – August 22, 2016) was an American professional baseball player. He played in Major League Baseball as a catcher, pinch hitter and designated hitter for the New York Yankees (1967), Pittsburgh Pirates (1971–72), California Angels (1973–74) and Oakland Athletics (1975). Sands stood 6 feet 2 inches (1.88 m) tall, weighed 200 pounds (91 kg), batted left-handed and threw right-handed.

Sands was a member of the Pirates' 1971 National League and World Series champions, and batted one time in the Fall Classic, pinch hitting for Bob Veale in the sixth inning of Game 2 and striking out against eventual Hall of Famer Jim Palmer.

Over six seasons he played in 93 games and had 145 at-bats, 15 runs, 31 hits, 6 doubles, 1 triple, 6 home runs, 23 RBI, 36 walks, .214 batting average, .372 on-base percentage, .393 slugging percentage, 57 total bases, 1 sacrifice fly and 4 intentional walks. He died on August 22, 2016, at the age of 68.
