= Rimp Lanier =

American baseball player (born 1948)

- Pinch hitter/Pinch runner
- Born: October 19, 1948 (age 77); Tuskegee, Alabama
- Batted: Left Threw: Right

MLB debut
- September 11, 1971, for the Pittsburgh Pirates

Last MLB appearance
- September 26, 1971, for the Pittsburgh Pirates

MLB statistics
- Batting average: .000
- At bats: 4
- Runs scored: 0
- Stats at Baseball Reference

Teams
- Pittsburgh Pirates (1971)

Lorenzo "Rimp" Lanier (born October 19, 1948) is an American former professional baseball player. An outfielder and third baseman, Lanier had a September trial with the 1971 Pittsburgh Pirates of Major League Baseball. He appeared in six games, five as a pinch hitter and one as a pinch runner, with five plate appearances, no hits and no runs scored. He reached base once when he was hit by a pitch thrown by Gary Gentry of the New York Mets on September 17. Lanier was not on the postseason roster as the Pirates went on to win the National League pennant and the 1971 World Series.

Lanier stood 5 feet 8 inches (1.73 m) tall and weighed 150 pounds (68 kg), batted left-handed and threw right-handed. He played for seven seasons (1967–73) in the Pirates' farm system, batting .289 with 608 hits in 633 minor league games.
