= Jim Nelson (baseball) =

American baseball player (1947–2004)

- Pitcher
- Born: July 4, 1947; Birmingham, Alabama, U.S.
- Died: August 22, 2004 (aged 57); Sacramento, California, U.S.
- Batted: Right Threw: Right

MLB debut
- May 30, 1970, for the Pittsburgh Pirates

Last MLB appearance
- July 15, 1971, for the Pittsburgh Pirates

MLB statistics
- Win–loss record: 6–4
- Earned run average: 3.06
- Strikeouts: 53
- Stats at Baseball Reference

Teams
- Pittsburgh Pirates (1970–1971)

James Lorin Nelson (July 4, 1947 – August 22, 2004) was an American right-handed pitcher in Major League Baseball for the Pittsburgh Pirates in 1970 and 1971.

Nelson was born in Birmingham, Alabama. The Pirates selected him in the 31st round of the 1965 amateur draft. His debut for the Pirates on May 30, 1970 was memorable. He relieved Gene Garber in the fifth inning of a game at Forbes Field against the San Francisco Giants, struck out Willie Mays, and got Willie McCovey to hit into a double play; he finished that appearance with three perfect innings pitched and four strikeouts, and hit a single in his only plate appearance.

Nelson started his career with a 4-0 record for the Pirates in 1970, a feat not equaled by a Pirates starting pitcher until Zach Duke in 2005. Nelson also was the last Pirate pitcher to win his first 3 career starts until Gerrit Cole matched the feat in 2013.

Nelson also was the starting and winning pitcher in the final game played at Forbes Field on June 28, 1970. He commented on the fans' frenzy at the end of that game: "After the game, the fans stormed the field and took everything, grass, bases, numbers off the scoreboard. I even saw some old ladies with parts of chairs. It was a real scene."

Nelson appeared in 15 games for the Pirates in 1970 and 17 games in 1971, both as a starter and a reliever. He struggled with control in 1971, walking 26 batters in 34 innings. In July, he was demoted to the minor leagues, but refused to report to his minor-league team. Although his teammates voted him a half-share of their 1971 World Series money, Pirates management did not award him a World Series ring. He underwent rotator cuff surgery and never returned to the majors.

Nelson was a good-hitting pitcher, with 7 hits in 26 career at bats for a batting average of .269.

After retiring from baseball, Nelson became a produce salesman. He died unexpectedly at his Sacramento, California home at age 57 in 2004.
