= Don Osborn =

American baseball player, coach, and manager (1908–1979)

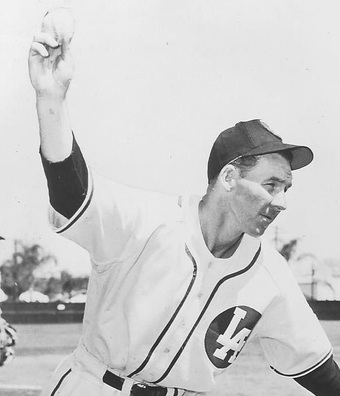
Osborn in 1947

Donald Edwin Osborn (June 23, 1908 – March 23, 1979) was an American pitcher and manager in minor league baseball and a scout, farm system official and pitching coach at the Major League level. Born in Sandpoint, Idaho, Osborn threw and batted right-handed, stood 6 feet (1.8 m) tall and weighed 185 pounds (84 kg).

Osborn's professional playing career began in 1929, and while he never reached the Major Leagues as a pitcher, he enjoyed great success in the Pacific Coast League (1936–38; 1943–47) and the Western International League (1938–42). He won 22 games for the 1936 Seattle Indians, and in 1942 led the WIL in victories (22), winning percentage (.815) and earned run average (1.63) as the playing manager of the league champion Vancouver Capilanos. It was Osborn's first year as a manager. He would lead teams in the farm systems of the Chicago Cubs and Philadelphia Phillies through 1957 before joining the Pittsburgh Pirates in 1958 as a roving troubleshooter and managerial consultant in their minor league system.

In 1963, Osborn was named pitching coach of the Pirates and would serve three terms in that post—1963–64; 1970–72; and 1974–76. During most of that time, he worked under manager Danny Murtaugh, and was a member of the 1971 World Series champion Pirates club. At age 70, Osborn was appointed pitching coach of the Bucs for a fourth time after the 1978 season, this time by skipper Chuck Tanner, but declining health forced his resignation a few weeks after his appointment.

He died, aged 70, in Torrance, California, during spring training in March 1979.

As a minor league pitcher, Osborn won 199 games, losing 119 for a .626 winning percentage. According to The Sporting News' Official Baseball Register, Osborn was nicknamed "The Wizard of Oz" for his pitching mastery. His record as a minor-league manager was 929–751 (.553) with four championships.

Preceded by Bill Burwell; Vern Law; Mel Wright	Pittsburgh Pirates pitching coach 1963–1964; 1970–1972; 1974–1976	Succeeded by Clyde King; Mel Wright; Larry Sherry
