= Bob Moose =

American baseball player (1947–1976)

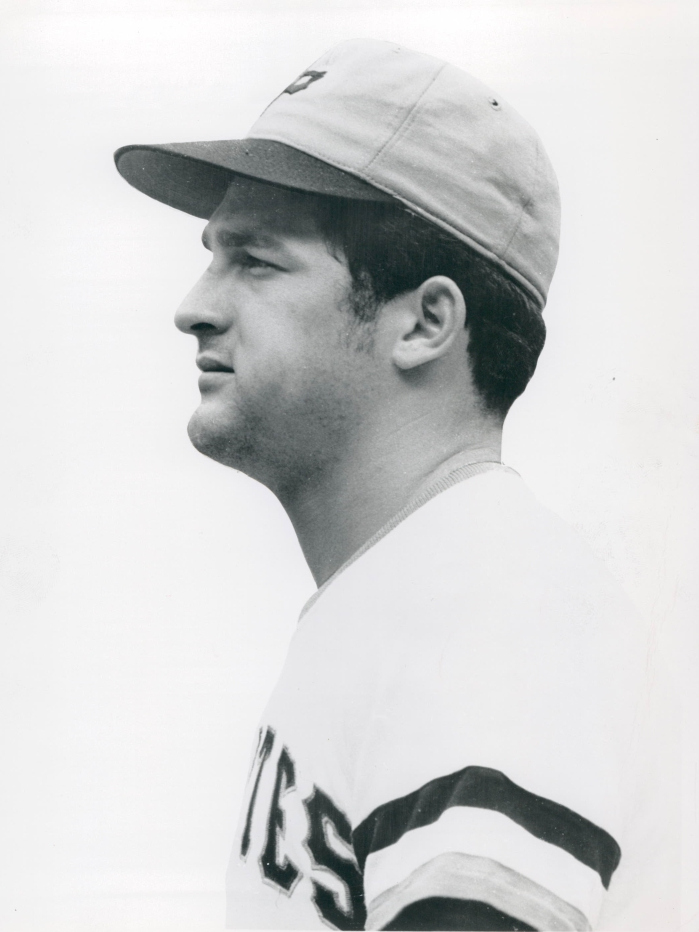
- Moose in 1972
- Pitcher
- Born: October 9, 1947; Export, Pennsylvania, U.S.
- Died: October 9, 1976 (aged 29); Martins Ferry, Ohio, U.S.
- Batted: Right Threw: Right

MLB debut
- September 19, 1967, for the Pittsburgh Pirates

Last MLB appearance
- September 25, 1976, for the Pittsburgh Pirates

MLB statistics
- Win–loss record: 76–71
- Earned run average: 3.50
- Strikeouts: 827
- Stats at Baseball Reference

Teams
- Pittsburgh Pirates (1967–1976)

Career highlights and awards
- World Series champion (1971); Pitched a no-hitter on September 20, 1969

Robert Ralph Moose Jr. (October 9, 1947 – October 9, 1976) was an American professional baseball player. He played his entire career in Major League Baseball as a right-handed pitcher for the Pittsburgh Pirates from 1967 through 1976.

== Biography ==
Moose was a member of Pirates teams that won five National League Eastern Division titles in six years between 1970 and 1975 and the World Series in 1971.

His best season came in 1969 when he posted a 14–3 won-loss record and a 2.91 Earned Run Average working equally as a starter and reliever. On September 20 of that year, he no-hit the eventual World Series champion New York Mets. He is also known for his wild pitch in the bottom half of the ninth inning which allowed George Foster to score the winning run in the fifth and deciding game of the 1972 NLCS, sending the Cincinnati Reds to the World Series after Pittsburgh had a one-run lead entering the bottom of the ninth.

During the 1974 season, Moose suffered a blood clot under the shoulder of his pitching arm. Surgery was required to remove the clot plus one of Moose's ribs.

== Death ==
Moose was killed on his twenty-ninth birthday in a two-vehicle auto accident on Ohio Route 7 in Martins Ferry, as he was returning from a tournament at Bill Mazeroski's golf course in Rayland, Ohio.

== See also ==
- List of baseball players who died during their careers
- List of Major League Baseball no-hitters
- List of Major League Baseball players who spent their entire career with one franchise

Preceded by Ken Holtzman	No-hitter pitcher September 20, 1969	Succeeded by Dock Ellis
