= 1971 World Series =

68th edition of Major League Baseball's championship series

Team (Wins)	Managers	Season
Pittsburgh Pirates (4)	Danny Murtaugh	97–65 (.599), GA: 7
Baltimore Orioles (3)	Earl Weaver	101–57 (.639), GA: 12
- Dates: October 9–17
- Venue(s): Memorial Stadium (Baltimore); Three Rivers Stadium (Pittsburgh)
- MVP: Roberto Clemente (Pittsburgh)
- Umpires: Nestor Chylak (AL), Ed Sudol (NL), Johnny Rice (AL), Ed Vargo (NL), Jim Odom (AL), John Kibler (NL)
- Hall of Famers: Umpire: Nestor Chylak; Pirates: Roberto Clemente; Bill Mazeroski; Willie Stargell; Orioles: Earl Weaver (manager); Jim Palmer; Brooks Robinson; Frank Robinson

Broadcast
- Television: NBC
- TV announcers: Curt Gowdy; Chuck Thompson (in Baltimore); Bob Prince (in Pittsburgh)
- Radio: NBC
- Radio announcers: Jim Simpson; Bob Prince (in Baltimore); Bill O'Donnell (Games 3–7)
- ALCS: Baltimore Orioles over Oakland Athletics (3–0)
- NLCS: Pittsburgh Pirates over San Francisco Giants (3–1)

The 1971 World Series was the championship round of Major League Baseball's (MLB) 1971 season and featured the first night game in its history. The 68th edition of the Fall Classic was a best-of-seven playoff between the defending World Series and American League (AL) champion Baltimore Orioles and the National League (NL) champion Pittsburgh Pirates. The Pirates overcame a two-games-to-none series deficit to defeat the Orioles in seven games, in large part because of superstar right fielder Roberto Clemente, whose all-around brilliance was on full display on a national stage. Game 4 in Pittsburgh was the first World Series game played at night.

Many in the know expected the highly touted Orioles to repeat as world champions, but the upstart Pirates proved to be the better team after some early struggles. The home side prevailed in each of the first six contests. In Game 7 in Baltimore, Pirates ace Steve Blass pitched a four-hit complete game in a 2–1 win over Mike Cuellar and the Orioles. This is the fourth-most recent postseason series won by the Pirates.

In his final World Series appearance, the 37-year-old Clemente became the first Spanish-speaking player to earn the World Series Most Valuable Player Award. The veteran delivered 12 hits for a .414 batting average and reached base four other times, two on walks and two on errors. He hit safely in all seven games of the Series, duplicating a feat that he had performed in 1960.

Twenty-one-year-old rookie Bruce Kison pitched 6 1/3 scoreless innings and allowed just one hit in two appearances for the Pirates. The right-handed side-winder set a record of three hit batters in a World Series game, which also tied the 1907 record.

This was the first of three consecutive World Series, all seven games, in which the winning team scored fewer runs overall. The trend continued for the next seven-game series in 1975. These two teams met again in the Fall Classic eight years later with the same result, as the Pirates won the final three games to win in seven, the final one on the road.

== Background ==
=== Pittsburgh Pirates ===
The Pirates won the National League East by a rather comfortable seven-game margin over the St. Louis Cardinals then defeated the San Francisco Giants, three games to one, in the National League Championship Series.

The Pirates were in the World Series for the first time since the heroics of Bill Mazeroski (his only appearance in the series came as a pinch-hitter in Game 1) in Game 7 of the 1960 match-up against the New York Yankees. Though not as decorated as their opponents, the Bucs boasted a deep staff in their own right. The group featured 19-game winner Dock Ellis, 15-game winner Steve Blass and closer Dave Giusti (30 saves).

What the Pirates did best was hit the baseball with authority, though, as no team scored more runs in either league. The best offense in the big leagues featured mashers Willie Stargell (.295, 48, 125), Bob Robertson (.271, 26, 72) and Richie Hebner (.271, 17, 67) and slashers Clemente (.341, 13, 86), Al Oliver (.282, 14, 64) and Manny Sanguillen (.319, 7, 81) among others.

=== Baltimore Orioles ===
Meanwhile, the Orioles dominated the American League East by 12 games over the Detroit Tigers then swept the Oakland Athletics in the American League Championship Series. The Orioles were coming off their third straight AL playoff series sweep (twice over the Minnesota Twins and once over Oakland) and their third straight season with over 100 wins: 109 (1969), 108 (1970), 101 (1971). Featuring four pitchers with 20 or more wins (Dave McNally (21), Mike Cuellar (20), Pat Dobson (20), Jim Palmer (20)), the bats of sluggers Frank Robinson (.281 batting average, 28 home runs, 99 RBI) and Boog Powell (.256, 22, 92) and sure hands of Brooks Robinson at third base and Mark Belanger at shortstop, the O's were primed to defend their title.

== Summary ==
NL Pittsburgh Pirates (4) vs. AL Baltimore Orioles (3)

Game	Date	Score	Location	Time	Attendance
1	October 9	Pittsburgh Pirates – 3, Baltimore Orioles – 5	Memorial Stadium	2:06	53,229
2	October 11†	Pittsburgh Pirates – 3, Baltimore Orioles – 11	Memorial Stadium	2:55	53,239
3	October 12	Baltimore Orioles – 1, Pittsburgh Pirates – 5	Three Rivers Stadium	2:20	50,403
4	October 13	Baltimore Orioles – 3, Pittsburgh Pirates – 4	Three Rivers Stadium	2:48	51,378
5	October 14	Baltimore Orioles – 0, Pittsburgh Pirates – 4	Three Rivers Stadium	2:16	51,377
6	October 16	Pittsburgh Pirates – 2, Baltimore Orioles – 3 (10)	Memorial Stadium	2:59	44,174
7	October 17	Pittsburgh Pirates – 2, Baltimore Orioles – 1	Memorial Stadium	2:10	47,291

†: postponed from October 10 due to rain

== Matchups ==
=== Game 1 ===
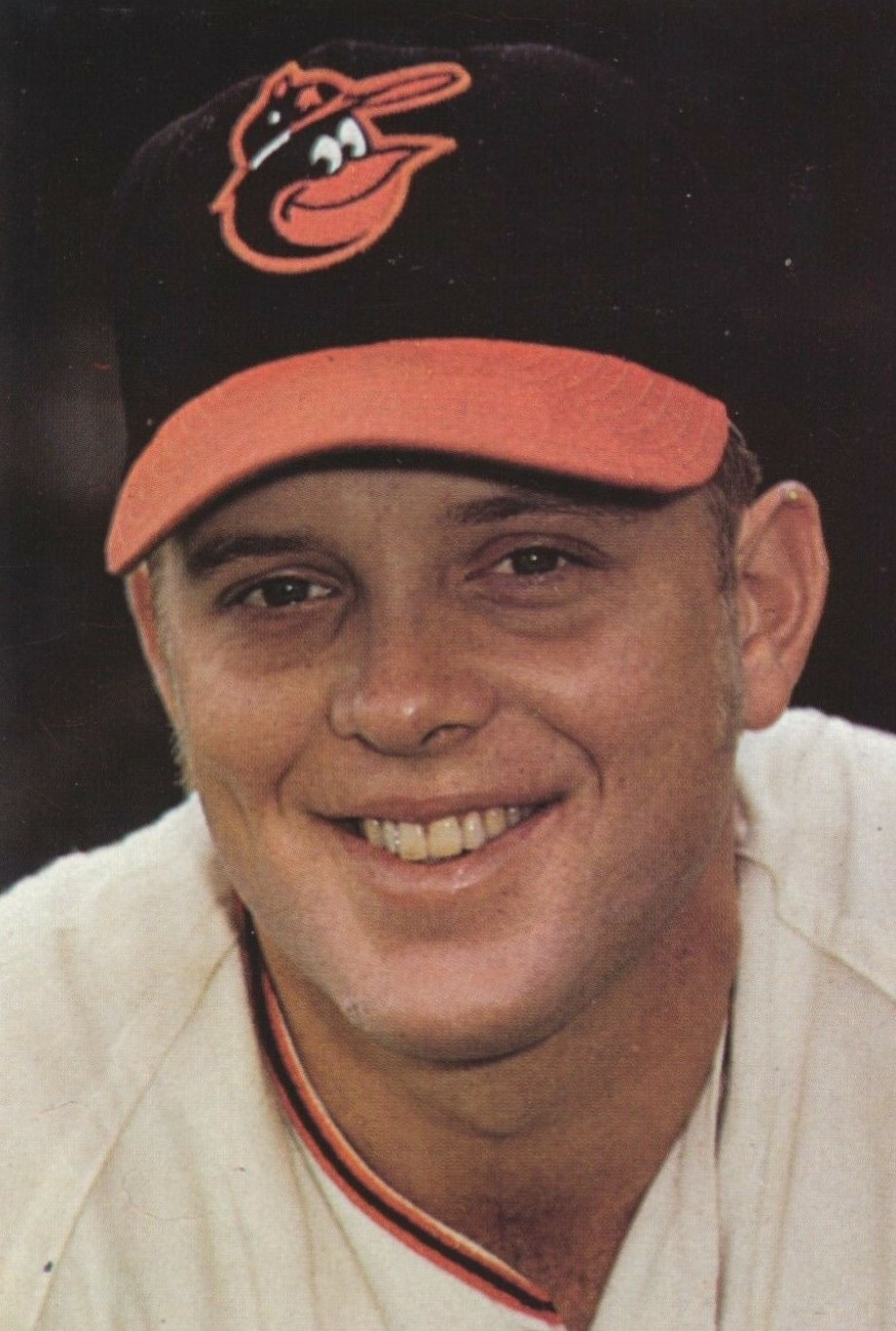
Merv Rettenmund

October 9, 1971 1:00 pm (ET) at Memorial Stadium in Baltimore, Maryland
Team	1	2	3	4	5	6	7	8	9	R	H	E
Pittsburgh	0	3	0	0	0	0	0	0	0	3	3	0
Baltimore	0	1	3	0	1	0	0	0	X	5	10	3
WP: Dave McNally (1–0) LP: Dock Ellis (0–1); Home runs: PIT: None; BAL: Frank Robinson (1), Merv Rettenmund (1), Don Buford (1)

The Pirates scored three in the second off of Dave McNally due to sloppy defense by the Orioles. Bob Robertson led off with a walk and went to second on a wild pitch by O's starter Dave McNally. Manny Sanguillén grounded to short, but Mark Belanger threw wildly to third in an attempt to retire Robertson. Robertson scored and Sanguillén pulled in at second. After advancing to third on a ground ball by José Pagán, Sanguillén scored on a suicide squeeze bunt laid down by Jackie Hernández, who went to second when catcher Elrod Hendricks threw wildly to first. Dave Cash singled home Hernandez with the only hit the Pirates got the whole inning among the three runs.

The Orioles rallied behind the long-ball. Frank Robinson hit a home run in the second and Merv Rettenmund blasted a three-run home run in the third off Dock Ellis to give the Orioles the lead. Don Buford added a home run off of Bob Moose in the fifth as McNally settled down and allowed only two more hits and no runs the rest of the way.

=== Game 2 ===
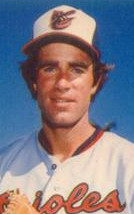
Jim Palmer

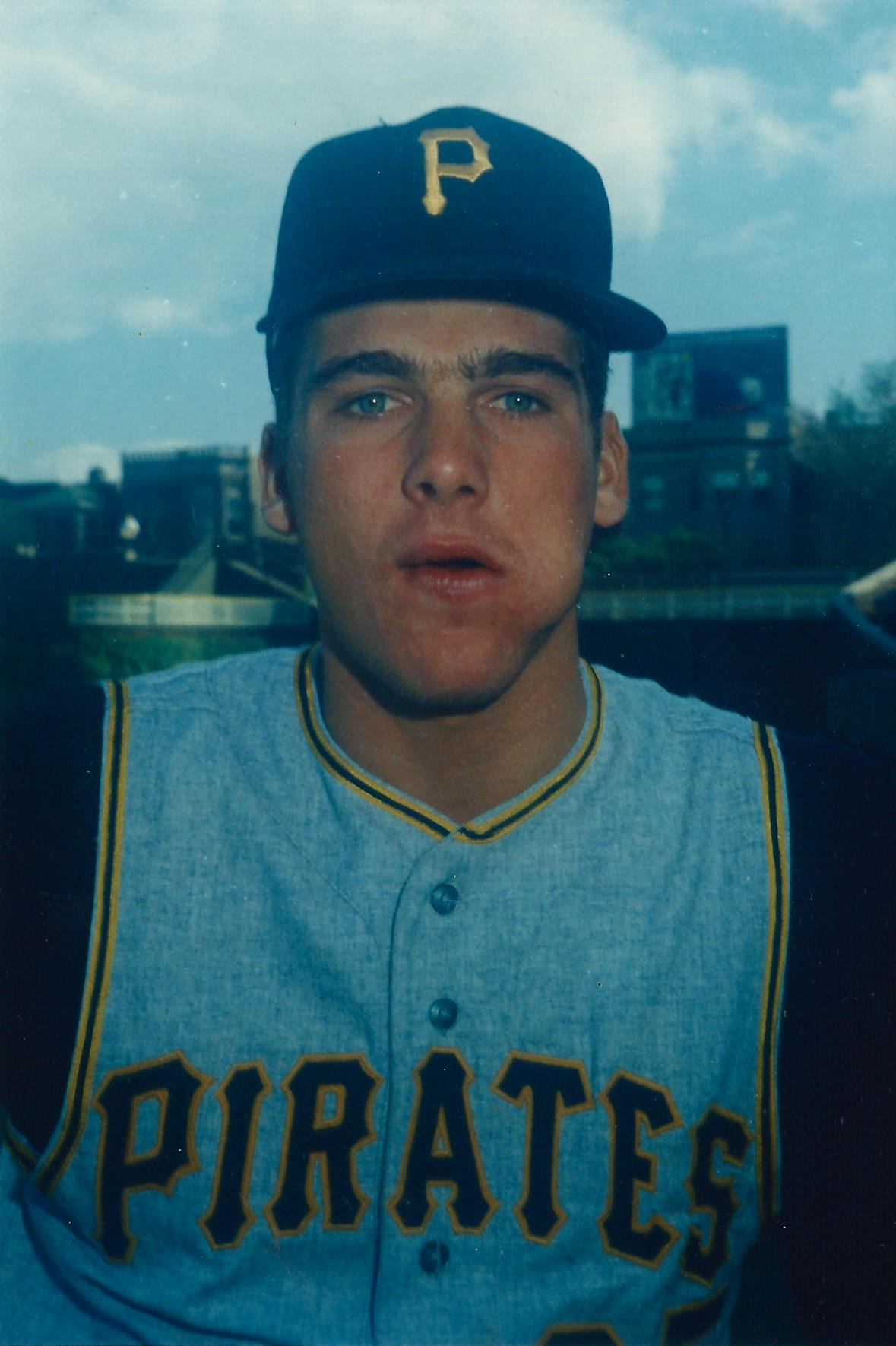
Richie Hebner

October 11, 1971 1:00 pm (ET) at Memorial Stadium in Baltimore, Maryland
Team	1	2	3	4	5	6	7	8	9	R	H	E
Pittsburgh	0	0	0	0	0	0	0	3	0	3	8	1
Baltimore	0	1	0	3	6	1	0	0	X	11	14	1
WP: Jim Palmer (1–0) LP: Bob Johnson (0–1) Sv: Dick Hall (1); Home runs: PIT: Richie Hebner (1); BAL: None

Following a one-day delay caused by the first World Series rainout in nine years, the Orioles took a 2–0 series lead on Monday afternoon. Baltimore pounded six Pirate pitchers for 14 hits (all singles) and 11 runs, led by three hits and four RBI by Brooks Robinson, who drove in the first Oriole run in the second. In the fourth, with the bases loaded by a single, hit-by-pitch and walk, Davey Johnson's two-run single made it 3–0 Orioles and knocked starter Bob Johnson out of the game. Two walks by Bruce Kison forced in another run to make it 4–0 Orioles. In the fifth, after two singles, Elrod Hendricks's two-run single, aided by an error and Robinson's single, made it 7–0 Orioles. After another single, Bob Veale relieved Moose and allowed two walks to load the bases and force in another run. Don Buford's groundout and Merv Rettenmund's RBI single made it 10–0 Orioles. Robinson's RBI single next inning off of Bob Miller capped the Orioles' scoring. Jim Palmer pitched seven shutout innings and helped himself the easy way by drawing two bases-loaded walks for two RBIs - the only time this has happened in a World Series game. The Pirates got their runs in the eighth when Richie Hebner hit a three-run homer off Palmer.

This was very nearly the first night game in World Series history. After rain postponed Game 2—originally scheduled for Sunday afternoon—Commissioner Bowie Kuhn suggested that the rescheduled game be played on Monday night. However, the Pirates objected as they wanted the honor of hosting the first World Series night game themselves at Three Rivers Stadium when Game Four was played. Thus Game Two was played on Monday afternoon in Baltimore.

=== Game 3 ===
October 12, 1971 1:00 pm (ET) at Three Rivers Stadium in Pittsburgh, Pennsylvania
Team	1	2	3	4	5	6	7	8	9	R	H	E
Baltimore	0	0	0	0	0	0	1	0	0	1	3	3
Pittsburgh	1	0	0	0	0	1	3	0	X	5	7	0
WP: Steve Blass (1–0) LP: Mike Cuellar (0–1); Home runs: BAL: Frank Robinson (2); PIT: Bob Robertson (1)

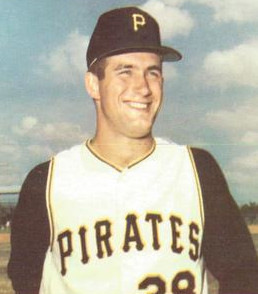
Steve Blass

With the Series shifting to Three Rivers Stadium and with Steve Blass available, the Pirates got back into it. Roberto Clemente's groundout with runners on second and third in the first put them up 1–0. Manny Sanguillén hit a leadoff double in the sixth and scored on Jose Pagan's single to make it 2–0 Pirates. Steve Blass pitched a complete game, allowing only three hits and one run (on a Frank Robinson home run in the seventh) and striking out eight.

The big blow on offense was struck by Bob Robertson, who slammed a three-run home run in the seventh inning off starter Mike Cuellar after missing the bunt sign. Manager Danny Murtaugh issued the sign to Robertson, who had no sacrifice bunts the entire season. Television replays showed Roberto Clemente, who was on second base, appearing to call a timeout, but Cuellar was already in his windup at the time. Blass was sitting next to Murtaugh in the dugout at the time and told the Pirate manager: "If you fine him (Robertson, for missing the bunt sign), I'll pay." Murtaugh ultimately did not fine him.

=== Game 4 ===
October 13, 1971 8:15 pm (ET) at Three Rivers Stadium in Pittsburgh, Pennsylvania
Team	1	2	3	4	5	6	7	8	9	R	H	E
Baltimore	3	0	0	0	0	0	0	0	0	3	4	1
Pittsburgh	2	0	1	0	0	0	1	0	X	4	14	0
WP: Bruce Kison (1–0) LP: Eddie Watt (0–1) Sv: Dave Giusti (1)

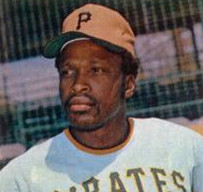
Al Oliver

In the first night game in World Series history, it started out looking like a long night for the Pirates. Starting pitcher Luke Walker gave up singles to the Orioles' first three batters, Paul Blair, Mark Belanger, and Merv Rettenmund, loading the bases. Blair scored and the others advanced on a Manny Sanguillén passed ball. Walker then intentionally walked Frank Robinson and gave up consecutive sacrifice flies to Brooks Robinson and Boog Powell, giving the Orioles a 3–0 lead.

Manager Danny Murtaugh then pulled Walker in favor of Bruce Kison. Kison proceeded to get the final out of the inning and then pitched shutout baseball for the next six innings, allowing only one hit and despite hitting three Oriole batters, a World Series record.

Kison's heroics allowed the Pirates to claw back off of starter Pat Dobson. Willie Stargell and Al Oliver cut the lead to 3–2 in the bottom of the first with back-to-back RBI doubles after a leadoff walk. Oliver tied the score at 3 in the third with an RBI single.

In the seventh, Bob Robertson and Sanguillén stroked one-out singles off reliever Eddie Watt. Pinch-hitter Vic Davalillo then lofted a short fly to center that Paul Blair dropped. Robertson reached third and Davalillo first, but Sanguillén was caught in a rundown between second and third. Backup catcher Milt May then batted for Kison and delivered a clutch go-ahead RBI single, scoring Robertson.

Dave Giusti pitched the final two innings of hitless ball for the Pirates and got the save.

=== Game 5 ===
Nelson Briles

October 14, 1971 1:00 pm (ET) at Three Rivers Stadium in Pittsburgh, Pennsylvania
Team	1	2	3	4	5	6	7	8	9	R	H	E
Baltimore	0	0	0	0	0	0	0	0	0	0	2	1
Pittsburgh	0	2	1	0	1	0	0	0	X	4	9	0
WP: Nelson Briles (1–0) LP: Dave McNally (1–1); Home runs: BAL: None; PIT: Bob Robertson (2)

Pirates manager Danny Murtaugh chose Nelson Briles to start Game 5 over the Pirates' top starters, Steve Blass and Dock Ellis, choosing to save them for potential Games 6 and 7. The gamble paid off as Briles pitched an efficient two-hit shutout. Bob Robertson's leadoff home run in the second inning off Dave McNally put the Pirates up 1–0. Manny Sanguillén singled, stole second and scored on Nelson Briles's two-out single to bump the Pirates' lead to 2–0. A wild pitch with runners on first and third allowed another run to score to make it 3–0 after three innings. Gene Clines hit a leadoff triple in the fifth and scored on Roberto Clemente's single, his first RBI scoring hit of the series, to cap the scoring as the Pirates took a 3–2 series lead heading back to Baltimore.

=== Game 6 ===
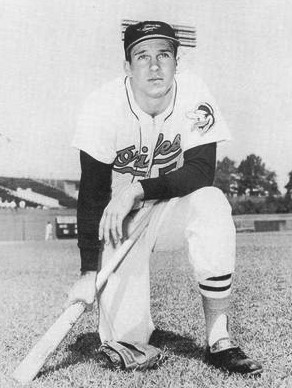
Brooks Robinson

October 16, 1971 1:00 pm (ET) at Memorial Stadium in Baltimore, Maryland
Team	1	2	3	4	5	6	7	8	9	10	R	H	E
Pittsburgh	0	1	1	0	0	0	0	0	0	0	2	9	1
Baltimore	0	0	0	0	0	1	1	0	0	1	3	8	0
WP: Dave McNally (2–1) LP: Bob Miller (0–1); Home runs: PIT: Roberto Clemente (1); BAL: Don Buford (2)

The 400th game played in World Series history, Baltimore returned to Memorial Stadium facing elimination. With Steve Blass needing another day of rest and Dock Ellis nursing an injury, Danny Murtaugh had to go to the well once again, starting reliever Bob Moose—his sixth different starter in this Series. Moose responded well by pitching shutout ball for five innings, while his Pirate teammates got him a 2–0 lead. Al Oliver doubled in the second off Jim Palmer and scored on a Bob Robertson single. Roberto Clemente added a homer in the third.

Moose started having trouble in the sixth, however. Don Buford belted a one-out homer and Moose allowed the next two batters to reach base before giving way to Bob Johnson, who ended the threat. The Orioles tied it off Johnson in the seventh when Mark Belanger singled, stole second, and scored on a single by Davey Johnson.

Both teams threatened late; the Orioles had runners on second and third in the bottom of the ninth with two out, but failed to score. The Pirates loaded the bases in the top of the tenth, but Dave McNally, pitching in relief, squelched the threat.

The Orioles staved off a World Series defeat in their half of the tenth when Frank Robinson drew a one-out walk and went to third on a Merv Rettenmund single. Brooks Robinson lifted a short fly to center and Frank Robinson tagged and scored the winning run, barely beating Vic Davalillo's throw to the plate.

=== Game 7 ===
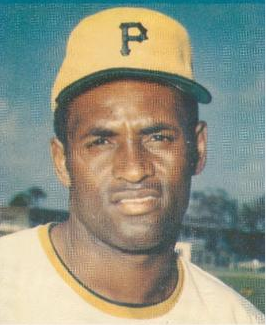
Roberto Clemente

October 17, 1971 2:00 pm (ET) at Memorial Stadium in Baltimore, Maryland
Team	1	2	3	4	5	6	7	8	9	R	H	E
Pittsburgh	0	0	0	1	0	0	0	1	0	2	6	1
Baltimore	0	0	0	0	0	0	0	1	0	1	4	0
WP: Steve Blass (2–0) LP: Mike Cuellar (0–2); Home runs: PIT: Roberto Clemente (2); BAL: None

With ace pitchers Steve Blass and Mike Cuellar on the mound for their respective teams, Game 7 proved to be a pitcher's duel.

Series MVP Roberto Clemente drew first blood for the Pirates by hitting a two-out homer in the fourth off Cuellar. The Pirates added another run in the eighth when José Pagán doubled in Willie Stargell.

The only run the O's could muster off Blass was an RBI groundout by Don Buford in the eighth. Blass would get his second complete game win of the series.

Game 7 was the only game in which the visiting team won. It was the fourth World Series in which the home team won each of the first six games before the road team won Game 7 with the others being 1955, 1956 and 1965.

After Game 2, the O's bats went silent. After pounding the Pirates pitching staff for 16 runs and 24 hits in the first two games, the O's scored only eight runs on 21 hits, hitting only .141 (21–149) in the next five games, enabling the Pirates to upset the Orioles. The O's as a team hit a poor .205 for the series.

The first pitch was one hour later than usual due to a Baltimore ordinance, since repealed, which prohibited Sunday sporting events from beginning prior to 2 p.m. This also occurred in Game 4 of the 1966 World Series and Game 2 of the 1969 World Series.

== Composite box ==
1971 World Series (4–3): Pittsburgh Pirates (N.L.) over Baltimore Orioles (A.L.)

Team	1	2	3	4	5	6	7	8	9	10	R	H	E
Pittsburgh Pirates	3	6	3	1	1	1	4	4	0	0	23	56	3
Baltimore Orioles	3	2	3	3	7	2	2	1	0	1	24	45	9
Total attendance: 351,091 Average attendance: 50,156; Winning player's share: $18,165 Losing player's share: $13,906

This was the first of three consecutive years in which the World Series went seven games and the champion was outscored.

== See also ==
- 1971 Japan Series
