= Steve Blass =

American baseball player (born 1942)

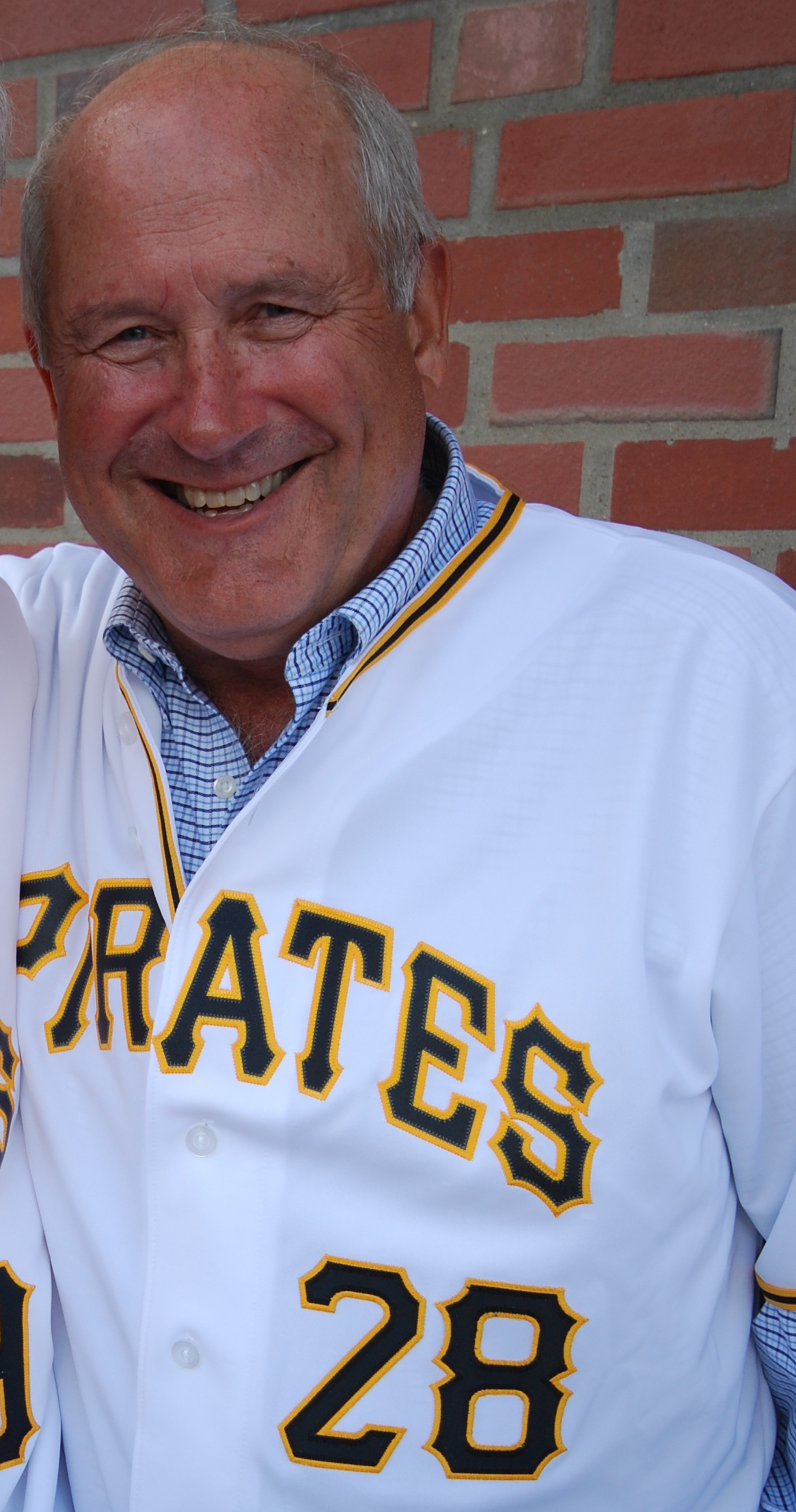
- Blass in 2009
- Pitcher
- Born: April 18, 1942 (age 84); Canaan, Connecticut, U.S.
- Batted: Right Threw: Right

MLB debut
- May 10, 1964, for the Pittsburgh Pirates

Last MLB appearance
- April 17, 1974, for the Pittsburgh Pirates

MLB statistics
- Win–loss record: 103–76
- Earned run average: 3.63
- Strikeouts: 896
- Stats at Baseball Reference

Teams
- Pittsburgh Pirates (1964, 1966–1974)

Career highlights and awards
- All-Star (1972); World Series champion (1971); Pittsburgh Pirates Hall of Fame

Stephen Robert Blass (born April 18, 1942) is an American retired professional baseball pitcher and television sports color commentator. He played his entire career in Major League Baseball as a right-handed pitcher for the Pittsburgh Pirates in 1964 and then from 1966 through 1974. Blass was one of the National League's top pitchers between 1968 and 1972, helping the Pirates win four National League Eastern Division titles in five years between 1970 and 1974. He played a key role in the Pirates victory over the Baltimore Orioles in the 1971 World Series when he recorded two complete game victories. He remains the last National League pitcher to throw a complete game in Game Seven of a World Series. After his playing career ended, Blass had a 34-year career as a television sports commentator for Pittsburgh Pirates games.

== Playing career ==
Blass was born in Canaan, Connecticut. Signed by the Pittsburgh Pirates in 1960, he made his major league debut at the age of 22 in 1964 and joined the team permanently in 1966. He won 18 games in 1968, including a 2.12 ERA with seven shutouts, both career highs, and he finished particularly strong, winning the NL Player of the Month award for September with a 5–1 record, 1.65 ERA, and 46 SO. In 1969 he won 16 games with a career-high 147 strikeouts. From 1969 to 1972 he won 60 games, with a career-high 19 victories in 1972. In that season, he was a member of the National League team in the 1972 All-Star Game and was the runner up to Steve Carlton for the National League Cy Young Award.

In the 1971 World Series against the Baltimore Orioles, Blass pitched two complete game wins, allowing only seven hits and two runs in 18 innings, and was the winning pitcher in the 7th and deciding game. He finished second in the voting for World Series MVP behind teammate Roberto Clemente.

In a ten-season major league career, Blass posted a 103–76 record with 896 strikeouts and a 3.63 ERA in 1,597.1 innings pitched, including 16 shutouts and 57 complete games.

=== "Steve Blass disease" ===
Besides his Series performance, Blass is best known for his sudden and inexplicable loss of control after the 1972 season. His ERA climbed to 9.85 in the 1973 season, during which he walked 84 batters in 88 2/3 innings, and struck out only 27; his WAR of -3.9 that year remains the worst of any pitcher in the modern era. After spending most of 1974 in the minor leagues, he retired from baseball in March 1975. Two months later writer Roger Angell chronicled Blass's travails in an essay in The New Yorker.

A condition referred to as "Steve Blass disease" has become a part of baseball lexicon. The "diagnosis" is applied to talented players who inexplicably and permanently seem to lose their ability to throw a baseball accurately. The fielder's variant of "Steve Blass disease" is sometimes referred to in baseball terminology as "Steve Sax syndrome".

Notable victims of "Steve Blass disease" include Rick Ankiel, Mark Wohlers, Dontrelle Willis, Ricky Romero, and Daniel Bard.

In an interview years later, Blass stated that he was content with how his career panned out, mentioning that he had ten good years with the Pirates, won 100 games, and appeared in a World Series. He did mention that the sudden death of teammate and close friend Roberto Clemente in the offseason before he lost control – and the associated grief related to suddenly losing someone so close – was not a factor in him losing his control.

== Post-playing career ==
Blass worked in the late 1970s as a Pittsburgh-area salesman for Jostens, a company that manufactures school class rings. He joined the Pirates' TV and radio broadcast team in 1983 as a part-time color commentator, earning a full-time post in 1986. Before the 2005 season, he announced that he would announce only home games from then on to spend more time with his family. Blass retired from broadcasting in 2019 after 60 years with the organization as a player and broadcaster.

He was inducted into the Kinston Professional Baseball Hall of Fame in 1997.

He was inducted into the Charleston, West Virginia Baseball Hall of Fame in 2022.

Blass' autobiography, A Pirate For Life (Triumph Books), was released on May 1, 2012. His memoirs, co-written with Erik Sherman, encompass his struggles with Steve Blass disease and his days as a color commentator for the Pirates.

Blass was announced as an inaugural member of the Pittsburgh Pirates Hall Of Fame on August 7, 2022.

== See also ==
- Pittsburgh Pirates broadcasters and media
- List of Major League Baseball players who spent their entire career with one franchise

Preceded by Pete Rose	Major League Player of the Month; September, 1968	Succeeded by Willie McCovey
