= 1971 Philadelphia Phillies season =

Major League Baseball season

1971 Philadelphia Phillies
- League: National League
- Division: East
- Ballpark: Veterans Stadium
- City: Philadelphia
- Owners: R. R. M. Carpenter, Jr.
- General managers: John J. Quinn
- Managers: Frank Lucchesi
- Television: WPHL-TV
- Radio: WCAU (By Saam, Harry Kalas, Richie Ashburn)

The 1971 Philadelphia Phillies season was the 89th season for the franchise in Philadelphia. The Phillies finished in sixth place in the National League East, with a record of 67–95 thirty games behind the first place Pittsburgh Pirates.

== Offseason ==
- October 7, 1970: Doc Edwards was released by the Phillies.
- November 3, 1970: Curt Flood and a player to be named later were traded by the Phillies to the Washington Senators for Greg Goossen, Jeff Terpko, and Gene Martin. The Phillies completed the trade by sending Terpko back to the Senators on April 10.
- December 16, 1970: Grant Jackson, Jim Hutto and Sam Parrilla were traded by the Phillies to the Baltimore Orioles for Roger Freed.

== Regular season ==
On April 10, the Phillies officially opened Veterans Stadium, their new home park, with a 4–1 victory over the Montreal Expos.

Harry Kalas was hired by the Phillies in 1971 to succeed Bill Campbell, and was the master of ceremonies at the 1971 opening of Veterans Stadium.

The Phillies played an exhibition game against the Reading Phillies on June 17, 1971, in Reading. The Phillies had signed second-round draft pick Mike Schmidt on June 11. Schmidt made his professional debut in the exhibition game in Reading. Schmidt played the whole game at shortstop for the Phillies and hit a game-winning home run against Reading. He was subsequently assigned to the Reading club, where he played the balance of the season.

On June 23, Rick Wise threw a no hitter against the Reds. Wise also hit two home runs in the 4–0 win. Pete Rose hit a sharp liner to 3rd baseman John Vukovich for the final out.

On June 25, Pittsburgh Pirates outfielder Willie Stargell hit what wound up being the longest home run in Veterans Stadium history off of pitcher Jim Bunning in a 14–4 Pirates win over the Phillies. The spot where the ball landed was marked with a yellow star with a black "S" inside a white circle until Stargell's 2001 death, when the white circle was painted black. The star remained until the stadium's 2004 demolition.

=== Season standings ===
NL East
Team	W	L	Pct.	GB	Home	Road
Pittsburgh Pirates	97	65	.599	—	52‍–‍28	45‍–‍37
St. Louis Cardinals	90	72	.556	7	45‍–‍36	45‍–‍36
Chicago Cubs	83	79	.512	14	44‍–‍37	39‍–‍42
New York Mets	83	79	.512	14	44‍–‍37	39‍–‍42
Montreal Expos	71	90	.441	25½	36‍–‍44	35‍–‍46
Philadelphia Phillies	67	95	.414	30	34‍–‍47	33‍–‍48

=== Record vs. opponents ===
1971 National League record Sources:
Team	ATL	CHC	CIN	HOU	LAD	MON	NYM	PHI	PIT	SD	SF	STL
Atlanta	—	5–7	9–9	9–9	9–9	7–5	7–5	8–4	4–8	11–7	7–11	6–6
Chicago	7–5	—	6–6	5–7	8–4	8–10	11–7	11–7	6–12	9–3	3–9	9–9
Cincinnati	9–9	6–6	—	5–13	7–11	7–5	8–4	5–7	5–7	10–8	9–9	8–4
Houston	9–9	7–5	13–5	—	8–10	4–8	5–7	8–4	4–8	10–8	9–9	2–10
Los Angeles	9–9	4–8	11–7	10–8	—	8–4	5–7	7–5	4–8	13–5	12–6	6–6
Montreal	5–7	10–8	5–7	8–4	4–8	—	9–9	6–12	7–11	6–5	7–5	4–14
New York	5–7	7–11	4–8	7–5	7–5	9–9	—	13–5	10–8	7–5	4–8	10–8
Philadelphia	4-8	7–11	2–10	3–9	5–7	6–10	5–13	—	6–12	4–8	6–6	7–11
Pittsburgh	8–4	12–6	7–5	8–4	8–4	11–7	8–10	12–6	—	9–3	3–9	11–7
San Diego	7–11	3–9	8–10	8–10	5–13	5–6	5–7	8–4	3–9	—	5–13	4–8
San Francisco	11–7	9–3	9–9	9–9	6–12	5–7	8–4	6–6	9–3	13–5	—	5–7
St. Louis	6–6	9–9	4–8	10–2	6–6	14–4	8–10	11–7	7–11	8–4	7–5	—

=== Notable transactions ===
- April 22, 1971: Johnny Briggs was traded by the Phillies to the Milwaukee Brewers for Ray Peters and Pete Koegel.
- June 12, 1971: Tony Taylor was traded by the Phillies to the Detroit Tigers for Carl Cavanaugh (minors) and Mike Fremuth (minors).
- July 17, 1971: Jerry Martin was signed as an amateur free agent by the Phillies.

==== Draft picks ====
- June 8, 1971: 1971 Major League Baseball draft
  - Mike Schmidt was drafted by the Philadelphia Phillies in the 2nd round. Player signed June 11, 1971.
  - Dane Iorg was drafted by the Phillies in the 1st round (22nd pick) of the Secondary Phase. Player signed June 19, 1971.

=== Game log ===
Legend
	Phillies win
	Phillies loss
	Postponement
**Bold**	Phillies team member

1971 Game Log
Overall Record: 67–95
April (7–12)

#	Date	Opponent	Score	Win	Loss	Save	Attendance	Record
1	April 6	@ Pirates	2–4	Dock Ellis (1–0)	**Chris Short** (0–1)	None	39,712	0–1
2	April 8	@ Pirates	0–2	Luke Walker (1–0)	**Woodie Fryman** (0–1)	None	12,289	0–2
3	April 10	Expos	4–1	**Jim Bunning** (1–0)	Bill Stoneman (0–1)	**Joe Hoerner** (1)	55,352	1–2
4	April 11	Expos	11–4	**Barry Lersch** (1–0)	Carl Morton (0–2)	**Bucky Brandon** (1)	12,431	2–2
5	April 12	Pirates	3–4 (11)	Dave Giusti (1–0)	**Dick Selma** (0–1)	None	19,469	2–3
6	April 13	Pirates	3–9	Nelson Briles (1–1)	**Chris Short** (0–2)	None	14,934	2–4
7	April 14	Pirates	6–5	**Joe Hoerner** (1–0)	Mudcat Grant (0–1)	**Dick Selma** (1)	8,379	3–4
8	April 16	Braves	7–8	Cecil Upshaw (3–0)	**Jim Bunning** (1–1)	None	15,099	3–5
9	April 17	Braves	2–6	Ron Reed (2–1)	**Barry Lersch** (1–1)	None	10,686	3–6
10	April 18	Braves	4–5 (10)	Cecil Upshaw (4–0)	**Woodie Fryman** (0–2)	None	29,583	3–7
11	April 20	@ Expos	1–0	**Chris Short** (1–2)	Ernie McAnally (0–1)	None	11,634	4–7
–	April 21	@ Expos	Postponed (rain); Makeup: September 20 as a traditional double-header					
12	April 22	@ Cardinals	2–5	Steve Carlton (4–0)	**Jim Bunning** (1–2)	None	8,411	4–8
13	April 23	@ Cardinals	8–6	**Bucky Brandon** (1–0)	George Brunet (0–1)	None	29,290	5–8
14	April 24	@ Cardinals	0–5	Jerry Reuss (2–2)	**Bill Champion** (0–1)	None	17,733	5–9
15	April 25	@ Cardinals	4–5	Frank Linzy (1–0)	**Woodie Fryman** (0–3)	None	13,122	5–10
16	April 26	@ Astros	2–1	**Rick Wise** (1–0)	Tom Griffin (0–3)	None	7,227	6–10
17	April 27	@ Astros	0–1	Larry Dierker (3–0)	**Jim Bunning** (1–3)	None	8,152	6–11
18	April 28	@ Astros	3–4 (10)	Jim Ray (1–1)	**Bucky Brandon** (1–1)	None	8,576	6–12
19	April 30	@ Cubs	1–0	**Chris Short** (2–2)	Milt Pappas (3–2)	None	9,110	7–12

May (10–18)

#	Date	Opponent	Score	Win	Loss	Save	Attendance	Record
20	May 1	@ Cubs	4–7	Ferguson Jenkins (4–2)	**Rick Wise** (1–1)	None	16,618	7–13
21	May 2	@ Cubs	1–7	Bill Hands (3–3)	**Jim Bunning** (1–4)	None	9,585	7–14
22	May 3	Cardinals	3–2	**Barry Lersch** (2–1)	Chris Zachary (0–1)	**Joe Hoerner** (2)	9,102	8–14
23	May 4	Cardinals	3–7	Jerry Reuss (3–3)	**Chris Short** (2–3)	None	9,339	8–15
24	May 5	Cardinals	1–5	Reggie Cleveland (2–2)	**Joe Hoerner** (1–1)	None	10,184	8–16
–	May 6	Cardinals	Postponed (rain); Makeup: September 6 as a traditional double-header					
25	May 7	Astros	1–8	Don Wilson (2–2)	**Jim Bunning** (1–5)	None	15,728	8–17
–	May 8	Astros	Postponed (rain); Makeup: July 27 as a traditional double-header					
26	May 9	Astros	2–1	**Barry Lersch** (3–1)	Jack Billingham (2–2)	None	36,145	9–17
27	May 10	Cubs	0–3	Ferguson Jenkins (6–2)	**Chris Short** (2–4)	None	8,606	9–18
28	May 11	Cubs	2–6	Bill Hands (4–4)	**Rick Wise** (1–2)	None	9,873	9–19
29	May 12	Cubs	4–9	Ken Holtzman (2–4)	**Jim Bunning** (1–6)	None	8,518	9–20
30	May 14	@ Braves	2–3	Ron Reed (5–2)	**Barry Lersch** (3–2)	Cecil Upshaw (5)	10,164	9–21
31	May 15	@ Braves	2–6	Phil Niekro (3–3)	**Chris Short** (2–5)	None	4,976	9–22
32	May 16	@ Braves	4–3	**Rick Wise** (2–2)	Pat Jarvis (0–5)	**Woodie Fryman** (1)	16,990	10–22
33	May 17	@ Reds	3–2	**Jim Bunning** (2–6)	Jim Merritt (0–5)	**Bucky Brandon** (2)	7,089	11–22
34	May 18	@ Reds	3–4	Don Gullett (4–2)	**Barry Lersch** (3–3)	Joe Gibbon (3)	7,399	11–23
35	May 19	Mets	4–1	**Chris Short** (3–5)	Jerry Koosman (3–2)	None	19,159	12–23
36	May 20	Mets	1–0	**Rick Wise** (3–2)	Gary Gentry (3–4)	None	14,619	13–23
37	May 21	Reds	3–7	Tony Cloninger (2–1)	**Jim Bunning** (2–7)	Wayne Granger (5)	26,159	13–24
38	May 22	Reds	5–3	**Barry Lersch** (4–3)	Jim Merritt (0–6)	None	31,628	14–24
39	May 23	Reds	3–4	Don Gullett (5–2)	**Chris Short** (3–6)	Clay Carroll (6)	40,455	14–25
40	May 24	Reds	2–1	**Rick Wise** (4–2)	Gary Nolan (3–4)	None	13,614	15–25
41	May 25	@ Mets	4–5 (12)	Danny Frisella (2–1)	**Jim Bunning** (2–8)	None	18,853	15–26
42	May 26	@ Mets	3–2 (12)	**Bucky Brandon** (2–1)	Tug McGraw (3–2)	None	22,409	16–26
43	May 28	@ Dodgers	2–6	Al Downing (4–2)	**Chris Short** (3–7)	None	27,309	16–27
44	May 29	@ Dodgers	3–9	Bill Singer (3–9)	**Rick Wise** (4–3)	None	35,843	16–28
45	May 30	@ Dodgers	1–2 (12)	Jim Brewer (3–1)	**Bucky Brandon** (2–2)	None	36,385	16–29
46	May 31 (1)	@ Padres	3–1	**Jim Bunning** (3–8)	Al Severinsen (1–1)	**Bucky Brandon** (3)	see 2nd game	17–29
47	May 31 (2)	@ Padres	3–6	Bob Miller (2–1)	**Barry Lersch** (4–4)	None	7,458	17–30

June (14–15)

#	Date	Opponent	Score	Win	Loss	Save	Attendance	Record
48	June 2	@ Padres	0–6	Steve Arlin (2–7)	**Rick Wise** (4–4)	None	2,425	17–31
49	June 4	@ Giants	5–3	**Chris Short** (4–7)	Gaylord Perry (6–3)	**Jim Bunning** (1)	9,403	18–31
50	June 5	@ Giants	5–3	**Joe Hoerner** (2–1)	Jerry Johnson (6–2)	None	10,945	19–31
51	June 6 (1)	@ Giants	1–0	**Rick Wise** (5–4)	Steve Stone (4–4)	None	see 2nd game	20–31
52	June 6 (2)	@ Giants	3–4 (12)	Rich Robertson (2–2)	**Joe Hoerner** (2–2)	None	33,516	20–32
53	June 8	Dodgers	2–4	Bill Singer (4–9)	**Chris Short** (4–8)	Jim Brewer (5)	21,388	20–33
54	June 9	Dodgers	9–4	**Ken Reynolds** (1–0)	Claude Osteen (6–4)	**Woodie Fryman** (2)	19,004	21–33
55	June 10	Dodgers	4–2	**Rick Wise** (6–4)	Don Sutton (4–6)	None	19,493	22–33
56	June 11	Padres	1–2	Dave Roberts (5–5)	**Barry Lersch** (4–5)	None	19,260	22–34
57	June 12	Padres	3–0	**Jim Bunning** (4–8)	Steve Arlin (2–9)	**Bucky Brandon** (4)	17,039	23–34
58	June 13	Padres	8–9	Bob Miller (3–1)	**Bill Wilson** (0–1)	Dick Kelley (1)	35,343	23–35
59	June 14	Giants	9–4	**Rick Wise** (7–4)	Gaylord Perry (6–5)	None	16,118	24–35
60	June 15	Giants	0–6	Ron Bryant (6–3)	**Barry Lersch** (4–6)	None	21,588	24–36
61	June 16	Giants	6–3	**Jim Bunning** (5–8)	Steve Stone (4–5)	**Joe Hoerner** (3)	27,212	25–36
62	June 18	@ Mets	0–2	Gary Gentry (6–4)	**Ken Reynolds** (1–1)	None	45,428	25–37
63	June 19	@ Mets	5–6 (15)	Danny Frisella (3–1)	**Bill Wilson** (0–2)	None	52,171	25–38
64	June 20 (1)	@ Mets	6–7	Tug McGraw (5–3)	**Bucky Brandon** (2–3)	None	see 2nd game	25–39
65	June 20 (2)	@ Mets	9–7 (11)	**Woodie Fryman** (1–3)	Jim McAndrew (0–3)	None	51,134	26–39
66	June 21	@ Reds	5–3 (12)	**Bucky Brandon** (3–3)	Jim Merritt (0–9)	None	11,683	27–39
67	June 22	@ Reds	1–6	Gary Nolan (5–7)	**Ken Reynolds** (1–2)	None	13,226	27–40
68	June 23	@ Reds	4–0	**Rick Wise** (8–4)	Ross Grimsley (4–3)	None	13,329	28–40
69	June 24	@ Reds	3–1 (10)	**Joe Hoerner** (3–2)	Joe Gibbon (1–2)	None	16,215	29–40
70	June 25	Pirates	4–14	Steve Blass (9–3)	**Jim Bunning** (5–9)	None	38,736	29–41
71	June 26	Pirates	9–11	Dock Ellis (12–3)	**Chris Short** (4–9)	Dave Giusti (14)	24,965	29–42
72	June 27 (1)	Pirates	8–4	**Woodie Fryman** (2–3)	Bob Johnson (4–5)	**Joe Hoerner** (4)	see 2nd game	30–42
73	June 27 (2)	Pirates	9–10	Bob Veale (3–0)	**Joe Hoerner** (3–3)	Dave Giusti (15)	37,062	30–43
74	June 28	@ Mets	1–3	Gary Gentry (7–5)	**Rick Wise** (8–5)	None	24,151	30–44
75	June 29	@ Mets	0–3	Tom Seaver (10–3)	**Barry Lersch** (4–7)	None	22,017	30–45
76	June 30	Reds	7–4	**Bucky Brandon** (4–3)	Joe Gibbon (1–3)	None	17,578	31–45

July (15–16)

#	Date	Opponent	Score	Win	Loss	Save	Attendance	Record
77	July 1	Reds	1–5	Jim McGlothlin (4–5)	**Jim Bunning** (5–10)	None	15,586	31–46
78	July 2 (1)	@ Expos	2–4	Dan McGinn (1–1)	**Rick Wise** (8–6)	None	see 2nd game	31–47
79	July 2 (2)	@ Expos	8–4	**Woodie Fryman** (3–3)	Bill Stoneman (9–8)	None	22,210	32–47
80	July 3	@ Expos	6–3	**Joe Hoerner** (4–3)	Carl Morton (7–10)	None	17,074	33–47
81	July 4	@ Expos	10–6	**Chris Short** (5–9)	Claude Raymond (1–6)	**Bill Wilson** (1)	16,422	34–47
82	July 5	@ Braves	6–5	**Woodie Fryman** (4–3)	Bob Priddy (3–5)	**Joe Hoerner** (5)	33,353	35–47
83	July 6	@ Braves	2–5	George Stone (2–3)	**Rick Wise** (8–7)	Cecil Upshaw (11)	7,950	35–48
84	July 7	@ Braves	2–4	Ron Reed (9–6)	**Barry Lersch** (4–8)	None	12,268	35–49
85	July 8	Expos	7–5	**Bill Wilson** (1–2)	Howie Reed (2–2)	None	12,586	36–49
86	July 9	Expos	0–3	Steve Renko (8–9)	**Chris Short** (5–10)	None	14,847	36–50
87	July 10 (1)	Expos	2–0	**Woodie Fryman** (5–3)	John Strohmayer (2–2)	None	see 2nd game	37–50
88	July 10 (2)	Expos	3–2	**Rick Wise** (9–7)	Bill Stoneman (10–9)	None	37,014	38–50
89	July 11	Expos	11–5	**Bill Champion** (1–1)	Dan McGinn (1–2)	**Joe Hoerner** (6)	10,321	39–50
–	July 13	**1971 Major League Baseball All-Star Game at Tiger Stadium in Detroit**						
90	July 15	@ Cubs	6–7	Joe Decker (1–1)	**Jim Bunning** (5–11)	None	26,346	39–51
91	July 16	@ Cubs	2–11	Ferguson Jenkins (14–8)	**Chris Short** (5–11)	None	23,212	39–52
92	July 17	@ Cubs	5–2	**Woodie Fryman** (6–3)	Bill Hands (9–10)	**Joe Hoerner** (7)	30,352	40–52
93	July 18 (1)	@ Astros	1–0	**Ken Reynolds** (2–2)	Don Wilson (6–7)	None	see 2nd game	41–52
94	July 18 (2)	@ Astros	7–10	George Culver (4–6)	**Jim Bunning** (5–12)	None	32,181	41–53
95	July 19	@ Astros	2–3 (11)	Buddy Harris (1–0)	**Bill Wilson** (1–3)	None	13,693	41–54
96	July 20	@ Cardinals	5–1	**Chris Short** (6–11)	Jerry Reuss (8–10)	None	14,650	42–54
97	July 21	@ Cardinals	1–6	Reggie Cleveland (9–8)	**Barry Lersch** (4–9)	None	16,200	42–55
98	July 22	@ Cardinals	0–8	Bob Gibson (7–9)	**Woodie Fryman** (6–4)	None	20,547	42–56
99	July 23	Cubs	4–3	**Ken Reynolds** (3–2)	Ken Holtzman (9–11)	**Bill Wilson** (2)	48,543	43–56
100	July 24	Cubs	1–2	Ferguson Jenkins (16–8)	**Rick Wise** (9–8)	None	30,240	43–57
101	July 25	Cubs	2–1	**Bill Wilson** (2–3)	Bill Hands (9–11)	None	19,572	44–57
102	July 26	Astros	4–7 (15)	Jim Ray (7–2)	**Bucky Brandon** (4–4)	None	10,848	44–58
103	July 27 (1)	Astros	8–3	**Woodie Fryman** (7–4)	Larry Dierker (12–5)	None	see 2nd game	45–58
104	July 27 (2)	Astros	1–5	Wade Blasingame (7–8)	**Ken Reynolds** (3–3)	None	20,779	45–59
105	July 28	Astros	3–6	Don Wilson (8–7)	**Rick Wise** (9–9)	None	15,802	45–60
106	July 30	Cardinals	3–4	Bob Gibson (9–9)	**Chris Short** (6–12)	None	26,461	45–61
107	July 31	Cardinals	5–4 (16)	**Bucky Brandon** (5–4)	Moe Drabowsky (5–1)	None	19,269	46–61

August (11–16)

#	Date	Opponent	Score	Win	Loss	Save	Attendance	Record
108	August 1	Cardinals	6–9^{^{[a]}} (13)	Stan Williams (4–4)	**Manny Muñiz** (0–1)	None	22,432	46–62
109	August 2	Braves	4–0	**Rick Wise** (10–9)	George Stone (4–4)	None	12,104	47–62
110	August 3	Braves	3–2	**Chris Short** (7–12)	Bob Priddy (4–9)	None	17,703	48–62
111	August 4	Braves	3–5	Mike McQueen (3–1)	**Bucky Brandon** (5–5)	None	19,086	48–63
112	August 6	@ Pirates	3–2	**Bill Wilson** (3–3)	Dock Ellis (15–6)	None	21,323	49–63
113	August 7	@ Pirates	5–3	**Rick Wise** (11–9)	Bob Moose (7–7)	**Bill Wilson** (3)	29,565	50–63
114	August 8 (1)	@ Pirates	3–2	**Woodie Fryman** (8–4)	Steve Blass (11–5)	**Joe Hoerner** (8)	see 2nd game	51–63
115	August 8 (2)	@ Pirates	0–4	Bob Johnson (7–7)	**Chris Short** (7–13)	None	31,448	51–64
116	August 10	@ Dodgers	1–6	Bill Singer (7–13)	**Barry Lersch** (4–10)	None	26,508	51–65
117	August 11	@ Dodgers	1–4	Doyle Alexander (4–3)	**Ken Reynolds** (3–4)	None	20,135	51–66
118	August 12	@ Dodgers	3–1 (13)	**Bucky Brandon** (6–5)	Pete Mikkelsen (7–5)	None	19,755	52–66
119	August 13	@ Padres	5–2	**Rick Wise** (12–9)	Fred Norman (2–9)	None	4,006	53–66
120	August 15 (1)	@ Padres	4–5	Dick Kelley (2–3)	**Bill Wilson** (3–4)	None	see 2nd game	53–67
121	August 15 (2)	@ Padres	2–3	Dave Roberts (11–12)	**Barry Lersch** (4–11)	None	8,108	53–68
122	August 17	@ Giants	1–5	Gaylord Perry (13–9)	**Ken Reynolds** (3–5)	None	8,973	53–69
123	August 18	@ Giants	0–7	John Cumberland (7–2)	**Rick Wise** (12–10)	None	10,663	53–70
124	August 20	Dodgers	5–9	Pete Mikkelsen (8–5)	**Chris Short** (7–14)	Jim Brewer (15)	30,006	53–71
125	August 21	Dodgers	3–0	**Woodie Fryman** (9–4)	Bill Singer (7–15)	None	46,633	54–71
126	August 22	Dodgers	3–2	**Ken Reynolds** (4–5)	Claude Osteen (12–8)	**Bill Wilson** (4)	26,403	55–71
127	August 23	Padres	3–1	**Rick Wise** (13–10)	Fred Norman (2–11)	None	10,655	56–71
128	August 24	Padres	0–2	Ed Acosta (1–0)	**Barry Lersch** (4–12)	None	10,688	56–72
129	August 25	Padres	0–7	Clay Kirby (12–10)	**Bill Champion** (1–2)	None	10,696	56–73
–	August 27	Giants	Postponed (rain); Makeup: August 28 as a traditional double-header					
130	August 28 (1)	Giants	2–5	Steve Hamilton (2–2)	**Woodie Fryman** (9–5)	Jerry Johnson (15)	see 2nd game	56–74
131	August 28 (2)	Giants	7–3	**Rick Wise** (14–10)	John Cumberland (7–3)	None	33,012	57–74
132	August 29	Giants	3–8	Juan Marichal (14–9)	**Ken Reynolds** (4–6)	None	26,825	57–75
133	August 30	@ Pirates	4–6	Luke Walker (6–8)	**Bill Wilson** (3–5)	Dave Giusti (28)	13,399	57–76
134	August 31	@ Pirates	5–7	Bruce Kison (4–4)	**Joe Hoerner** (4–4)	Bob Miller (9)	16,179	57–77

September (10–18)

#	Date	Opponent	Score	Win	Loss	Save	Attendance	Record
135	September 1	@ Pirates	7–10	Luke Walker (7–8)	**Bucky Brandon** (6–6)	None	11,278	57–78
136	September 2	Mets	1–3	Gary Gentry (11–9)	**Rick Wise** (14–11)	None	17,110	57–79
137	September 3	Mets	1–7	Ray Sadecki (6–5)	**Ken Reynolds** (4–7)	None	16,293	57–80
138	September 4 (1)	Mets	5–6 (10)	Tug McGraw (11–4)	**Dick Selma** (0–2)	None	see 2nd game	57–81
139	September 4 (2)	Mets	0–3	Jim McAndrew (1–5)	**Barry Lersch** (4–13)	Danny Frisella (9)	25,560	57–82
140	September 5	Mets	7–3	**Woodie Fryman** (10–5)	Nolan Ryan (9–12)	**Bill Wilson** (5)	16,886	58–82
141	September 6 (1)	Cardinals	3–6	Bob Gibson (14–12)	**Rick Wise** (14–12)	None	see 2nd game	58–83
142	September 6 (2)	Cardinals	2–1	**Bill Champion** (2–2)	Chris Zachary (3–9)	**Joe Hoerner** (9)	13,193	59–83
143	September 7	Cardinals	5–7 (10)	Don Shaw (6–1)	**Bill Wilson** (3–6)	Al Santorini (2)	9,339	59–84
144	September 10	@ Mets	3–4	Jerry Koosman (6–9)	**Rick Wise** (14–13)	Danny Frisella (10)	25,437	59–85
145	September 11	@ Mets	2–9	Tom Seaver (18–8)	**Woodie Fryman** (10–6)	None	19,508	59–86
146	September 12	@ Mets	2–3	Danny Frisella (7–4)	**Joe Hoerner** (4–5)	None	16,704	59–87
147	September 13	@ Cardinals	6–5 (10)	**Bill Wilson** (4–6)	Don Shaw (6–2)	None	13,863	60–87
148	September 14	@ Cardinals	5–4	**Rick Wise** (15–13)	Chris Zachary (3–10)	**Chris Short** (1)	10,640	61–87
149	September 15	Expos	0–1	Ernie McAnally (10–10)	**Woodie Fryman** (10–7)	None	7,734	61–88
150	September 16	Expos	2–6	Steve Renko (15–14)	**Bill Champion** (2–3)	None	5,893	61–89
151	September 17	Cubs	3–4	Joe Decker (3–1)	**Ken Reynolds** (4–8)	Larry Gura (1)	13,644	61–90
152	September 18	Cubs	4–3 (12)	**Rick Wise** (16–13)	Phil Regan (5–4)	None	7,740	62–90
153	September 19	Cubs	3–6	Ferguson Jenkins (22–13)	**Barry Lersch** (4–14)	None	20,815	62–91
–	September 20	@ Expos	Postponed (rain); Makeup: September 21 as a traditional double-header					
–	September 20	@ Expos	Postponed (rain); Makeup: September 23					
154	September 21 (1)	@ Expos	5–4	**Bill Champion** (3–3)	Carl Morton (10–17)	**Bill Wilson** (6)	see 2nd game	63–91
155	September 21 (2)	@ Expos	3–4	Jim Britton (2–3)	**Ken Reynolds** (4–9)	Mike Marshall (23)	14,963	63–92
156	September 22	@ Expos	0–2	Bill Stoneman (17–14)	**Rick Wise** (16–14)	None	8,798	63–93
157	September 23	@ Expos	6–4	**Wayne Twitchell** (1–0)	Ernie McAnally (10–12)	**Bill Wilson** (7)	6,786	64–93
158	September 24	@ Cubs	6–1	**Barry Lersch** (5–14)	Milt Pappas (17–14)	None	2,183	65–93
159	September 25	@ Cubs	2–4	Ferguson Jenkins (23–13)	**Bill Champion** (3–4)	None	8,891	65–94
160	September 26	@ Cubs	5–1	**Ken Reynolds** (5–9)	Joe Decker (3–2)	None	18,505	66–94
161	September 28	Pirates	6–3	**Rick Wise** (17–14)	Dock Ellis (19–9)	None	14,582	67–94
162	September 30	Pirates	3–4	Bob Moose (11–7)	**Bill Champion** (3–5)	Dave Giusti (30)	14,157	67–95

^{^[a]}The August 1, 1971, game was protested by the Cardinals in the top of the twelfth inning.
The protest was later upheld, and the game was completed on September 7 (with new umpires).

=== Roster ===
1971 Philadelphia Phillies
**Roster**
**Pitchers**: 32 Bucky Brandon; 14 Jim Bunning; 31 Bill Champion; 35 Woodie Fryman; 43 Joe Hoerner; 34 Barry Lersch; 29 Manny Muñiz; 40 Lowell Palmer; 47 Ken Reynolds; 39 Dick Selma; 41 Chris Short; 33 Wayne Twitchell; 37 Bill Wilson; 38 Rick Wise	**Catchers**: 12 Pete Koegel; 6 Tim McCarver; 9 Mike Ryan; **Infielders**: 10 Larry Bowa; 15 Denny Doyle; 17 Terry Harmon; 11 Deron Johnson; 19 Greg Luzinski; 16 Don Money; 18 Bobby Pfeil; 8 Tony Taylor; 26 John Vukovich	**Outfielders**: 40 Mike Anderson; 12 Johnny Briggs; 24 Byron Browne; 20 Roger Freed; 23 Oscar Gamble; 22 Larry Hisle; 25 Joe Lis; 27 Willie Montañez; 21 Ron Stone	**Manager**: 1 Frank Lucchesi; **Coaches**: 3 Billy DeMars (Hitting & First Base); 5 Doc Edwards (Bullpen); 2 George Myatt (Third Base); 4 Ray Rippelmeyer (Pitching)

== Player stats ==
=== Batting ===
==== Starters by position ====
Note: Pos = Position; G = Games played; AB = At bats; H = Hits; Avg. = Batting average; HR = Home runs; RBI = Runs batted in

Pos	Player	G	AB	H	Avg.	HR	RBI
C	Tim McCarver	134	474	132	.278	8	46
1B	Deron Johnson	158	582	154	.265	34	95
2B	Denny Doyle	95	342	79	.231	3	24
SS	Larry Bowa	159	650	162	.249	0	25
3B	John Vukovich	74	217	36	.166	0	14
LF	Oscar Gamble	92	280	62	.221	6	23
CF	Willie Montañez	158	599	153	.255	30	99
RF	Roger Freed	118	348	77	.221	6	37

==== Other batters ====
Note: G = Games played; AB = At bats; H = Hits; Avg. = Batting average; HR = Home runs; RBI = Runs batted in

Player	G	AB	H	Avg.	HR	RBI
Don Money	121	439	98	.223	7	38
Terry Harmon	79	221	45	.204	0	12
Ron Stone	95	185	42	.227	2	23
Mike Ryan	43	134	22	.164	3	6
Joe Lis	59	123	26	.211	6	10
Tony Taylor	36	107	25	.234	1	5
Greg Luzinski	28	100	30	.300	3	15
Mike Anderson	26	89	22	.247	2	5
Larry Hisle	36	76	15	.197	0	3
Bobby Pfeil	44	70	19	.271	2	9
Byron Browne	58	68	14	.206	3	5
Pete Koegel	12	26	6	.231	0	3
Johnny Briggs	10	22	4	.182	0	3

=== Pitching ===
==== Starting pitchers ====
Note: G = Games pitched; IP = Innings pitched; W = Wins; L = Losses; ERA = Earned run average; SO = Strikeouts

Player	G	IP	W	L	ERA	SO
Rick Wise	38	272.1	17	14	2.88	155
Barry Lersch	38	214.1	5	14	3.78	113
Chris Short	31	173.0	7	14	3.85	95
Ken Reynolds	35	162.1	5	9	4.49	81

==== Other pitchers ====
Note: G = Games pitched; IP = Innings pitched; W = Wins; L = Losses; ERA = Earned run average; SO = Strikeouts

Player	G	IP	W	L	ERA	SO
Woodie Fryman	37	149.1	10	7	3.38	104
Jim Bunning	29	110.0	5	12	5.48	58
Bill Champion	37	108.2	3	5	4.39	49
Wayne Twitchell	6	16.0	1	0	0.00	15
Lowell Palmer	3	15.0	0	0	6.00	6

==== Relief pitchers ====
Note: G = Games pitched; W = Wins; L = Losses; SV = Saves; ERA = Earned run average; SO = Strikeouts

Player	G	W	L	SV	ERA	SO
Joe Hoerner	49	4	5	9	1.97	57
Bucky Brandon	52	6	6	4	3.90	44
Bill Wilson	38	4	6	7	3.07	40
Dick Selma	17	0	2	1	3.28	15
Manny Muñiz	5	0	1	0	6.97	6

== Awards and honors ==
=== Records ===
- Terry Harmon, National League record, Most Chances Accepted in one nine-inning game (18 chances on June 12, 1971)

== Farm system ==
Level	Team	League	Manager
AAA	Eugene Emeralds	Pacific Coast League	Andy Seminick
AA	Reading Phillies	Eastern League	Nolan Campbell
A	Peninsula Phillies	Carolina League	Howie Bedell
A	Spartanburg Phillies	Western Carolinas League	Bob Wellman
A-Short Season	Walla Walla Phillies	Northwest League	Garry Powel
Rookie	Pulaski Phillies	Appalachian League	Harry Lloyd

LEAGUE CHAMPIONS: Peninsula
