= 1971 St. Louis Cardinals season =

Major League Baseball season

1971 St. Louis Cardinals
- League: National League
- Division: East
- Ballpark: Busch Memorial Stadium
- City: St. Louis, Missouri
- Record: 90–72 (.556)
- Divisional place: 2nd
- Owners: August "Gussie" Busch
- General managers: Bing Devine
- Managers: Red Schoendienst
- Television: KSD-TV
- Radio: KMOX (Jack Buck, Jim Woods)

The 1971 St. Louis Cardinals season was the team's 90th season in St. Louis, Missouri and its 80th season in the National League. The Cardinals went 90–72 during the season and finished second in the National League East, seven games behind the eventual NL pennant and World Series champion Pittsburgh Pirates.

== Offseason ==
- October 5, 1970: Dick Allen was traded by the Cardinals to the Los Angeles Dodgers for Ted Sizemore and Bob Stinson.
- October 20, 1970: Carl Taylor and Jim Ellis were traded by the Cardinals to the Milwaukee Brewers for Jerry McNertney, George Lauzerique, and Jesse Huggins (minors).

== Regular season ==
The Cardinals scrapped their traditional buttoned jerseys for T-shirt style uniform tops, and would keep them until they switched back in 1992.

Third baseman Joe Torre won the MVP Award this year, batting .363, with 24 home runs and 137 RBIs. Pitcher Bob Gibson won a Gold Glove this year, and threw a no-hitter against the Pittsburgh Pirates on August 14.

=== Season standings ===
NL East
Team	W	L	Pct.	GB	Home	Road
Pittsburgh Pirates	97	65	.599	—	52‍–‍28	45‍–‍37
St. Louis Cardinals	90	72	.556	7	45‍–‍36	45‍–‍36
Chicago Cubs	83	79	.512	14	44‍–‍37	39‍–‍42
New York Mets	83	79	.512	14	44‍–‍37	39‍–‍42
Montreal Expos	71	90	.441	25½	36‍–‍44	35‍–‍46
Philadelphia Phillies	67	95	.414	30	34‍–‍47	33‍–‍48

=== Record vs. opponents ===
1971 National League record Sources:
Team	ATL	CHC	CIN	HOU	LAD	MON	NYM	PHI	PIT	SD	SF	STL
Atlanta	—	5–7	9–9	9–9	9–9	7–5	7–5	8–4	4–8	11–7	7–11	6–6
Chicago	7–5	—	6–6	5–7	8–4	8–10	11–7	11–7	6–12	9–3	3–9	9–9
Cincinnati	9–9	6–6	—	5–13	7–11	7–5	8–4	5–7	5–7	10–8	9–9	8–4
Houston	9–9	7–5	13–5	—	8–10	4–8	5–7	8–4	4–8	10–8	9–9	2–10
Los Angeles	9–9	4–8	11–7	10–8	—	8–4	5–7	7–5	4–8	13–5	12–6	6–6
Montreal	5–7	10–8	5–7	8–4	4–8	—	9–9	6–12	7–11	6–5	7–5	4–14
New York	5–7	7–11	4–8	7–5	7–5	9–9	—	13–5	10–8	7–5	4–8	10–8
Philadelphia	4-8	7–11	2–10	3–9	5–7	6–10	5–13	—	6–12	4–8	6–6	7–11
Pittsburgh	8–4	12–6	7–5	8–4	8–4	11–7	8–10	12–6	—	9–3	3–9	11–7
San Diego	7–11	3–9	8–10	8–10	5–13	5–6	5–7	8–4	3–9	—	5–13	4–8
San Francisco	11–7	9–3	9–9	9–9	6–12	5–7	8–4	6–6	9–3	13–5	—	5–7
St. Louis	6–6	9–9	4–8	10–2	6–6	14–4	8–10	11–7	7–11	8–4	7–5	—

=== Game log ===
1971 St. Louis Cardinals Game Log (90–72)
April: (13–11)

#	Date	Opponent	Score	Win	Loss	Save	Attendance	Record
1	April 6	@ Cubs	1–2	Jenkins	Gibson		39,079	0–1
2	April 7	@ Cubs	14–3	Carlton	Hands		23,287	1–1
3	April 10	Giants	4–6	Reberger	Reuss	Johnson	26,841	1–2
4	April 11 (1)	Giants	4–2	Gibson	Robertson			2–2
5	April 11 (2)	Giants	2–7	Marichal	Cleveland		27,104	2–3
6	April 12	Astros	5–4	Carlton	Blasingame	Linzy	11,270	3–3
7	April 13	Astros	4–8	Culver	Torrez	Lemaster	5,105	3–4
8	April 14	@ Dodgers	7–1	Reuss	Osteen	Linzy	11,644	4–4
9	April 15	@ Dodgers	1–2	Downing	Cleveland		12,632	4–5
10	April 16	@ Padres	7–1	Gibson	Coombs		6,782	5–5
11	April 17	@ Padres	4–0	Carlton	Phoebus		3,462	6–5
12	April 18	@ Padres	4–2	Torrez	Ross	Linzy	8,777	7–5
13	April 19	@ Giants	2–4	Bryant	Reuss		3,630	7–6
14	April 20	@ Giants	2–1	Cleveland	Marichal	Drabowsky	9,791	8–6
15	April 21	@ Giants	5–3	Gibson	Perry		6,178	9–6
16	April 22	Phillies	5–2	Carlton	Bunning		8,411	10–6
17	April 23	Phillies	6–8	Brandon	Brunet		29,290	10–7
18	April 24	Phillies	5–0	Reuss	Champion		17,733	11–7
19	April 25	Phillies	5–4	Linzy	Fryman		13,122	12–7
20	April 26	Mets	2–12	Seaver	Gibson		20,402	12–8
21	April 27	Mets	1–2	Koosman	Carlton	Frisella	8,575	12–9
22	April 28	Mets	1–9	Gentry	Torrez		8,171	12–10
23	April 29	Mets	0–7	Ryan	Reuss	Frisella	10,215	12–11
24	April 30	Expos	4–2	Shaw	Raymond		10,766	13–11

May: (19–6)

#	Date	Opponent	Score	Win	Loss	Save	Attendance	Record
25	May 1	Expos	2–2	Rain out	Tied after	7 innings	32,061	13–11
26	May 2	Expos	1–0	Carlton	Morton		10,320	14–11
27	May 3	@ Phillies	2–3	Lersch	Zachary	Hoerner	9,102	14–12
28	May 4	@ Phillies	7–3	Reuss	Short		9,339	15–12
29	May 5	@ Phillies	5–1	Cleveland	Hoerner		10,184	16–12
30	May 7	@ Mets	1–3	Seaver	Gibson		44,304	16–13
31	May 9	@ Mets	5–9	Koosman	Carlton	Frisella	27,189	16–14
32	May 10	@ Expos	8–5	Reuss	Renko	Linzy	16,703	17–14
33	May 11	@ Expos	10–4	Cleveland	Morton	Linzy	8,862	18–14
34	May 14	@ Astros	4–2	Gibson	Billingham		16,437	19–14
35	May 15	@ Astros	6–5	Carlton	Griffin	Taylor	19,285	20–14
36	May 16	@ Astros	4–12	Dierker	Reuss	Ray	14,983	20–15
37	May 18	Dodgers	6–5	Drabowsky	Brewer		14,753	21–15
38	May 19	Dodgers	5–6	Mikkelsen	Gibson		13,869	21–16
39	May 20	Dodgers	5–0	Carlton	Singer		11,875	22–16
40	May 21	Padres	15–8	Shaw	Laxton	Drabowsky	27,298	23–16
41	May 22	Padres	7–4	Zachary	Roberts	Shaw	10,776	24–16
42	May 23	Padres	6–1	Cleveland	Arlin		9,475	25–16
43	May 24	Padres	3–12	Phoebus	Gibson	Miller	8,609	25–17
44	May 25	Cubs	4–2	Carlton	Hands		12,667	26–17
45	May 26	Cubs	9–4	Taylor	Holtzman		12,690	27–17
46	May 27	Cubs	10–0	Zachary	Jenkins		14,167	28–17
47	May 28	Braves	4–0	Cleveland	Reed		14,537	29–17
48	May 29	Braves	8–7	Drabowsky	Upshaw		47,598	30–17
49	May 30	Braves	8–3	Carlton	P. Niekro		24,380	31–17
50	May 31	Braves	3–2	Reuss	Stone		20,349	32–17

June: (8–21)

#	Date	Opponent	Score	Win	Loss	Save	Attendance	Record
51	June 1	@ Pirates	0–9	Ellis (7–3)	Zachary (2–2)		21,516	32–18
52	June 2	@ Pirates	1–10	Walker (2–6)	Cleveland (5–3)	Veale (1)	9,612	32–19
53	June 3	@ Pirates	7–1	Carlton (10–2)	Johnson (4–4)		18,947	33–19
54	June 4	@ Reds	0–12	Grimsley (3–1)	Zachary (2–3)		17,120	33–20
55	June 5	@ Reds	5–3	Reuss (6–4)	Cloninger (2–4)	Drabowsky (3)	18,144	34–20
56	June 6	@ Reds	2–4	Gullett (6–2)	Cleveland (5–4)	Gibbon (5)	20,189	34–21
57	June 7	@ Braves	7–6	Drabowsky (3–0)	Priddy (2–2)		10,354	35–21
58	June 8	@ Braves	7–8	Upshaw (7–4)	Linzy (1–1)		8,518	35–22
59	June 9	@ Braves	3–8	P. Niekro (4–6)	Zachary (2–4)		7,506	35–23
60	June 10	Pirates	1–3	Blass (6–3)	Reuss (6–5)		18,950	35–24
61	June 11	Pirates	4–11	Ellis (9–3)	Cleveland (5–5)	Giusti (13)	27,308	35–25
62	June 12	Pirates	3–4	Grant (4–2)	Arroyo (0–1)		24,565	35–26
63	June 13	Pirates	4–8	Giusti (2–1)	Carlton (10–3)	Hernández (1)	21,205	35–27
64	June 14	Reds	2–7	Grimsley (4–1)	Reuss (6–6)	Carroll (7)	18,613	35–28
65	June 15	Reds	6–1	Cleveland (6–5)	Merritt (0–8)		19,514	36–28
66	June 16	Reds	0–1	Gullett (7–2)	Santorini (0–3)		19,232	36–29
67	June 17	@ Cubs	6–7	Bonham (1–1)	Zachary (2–5)		22,749	36–30
68	June 18	@ Cubs	5–15	Pappas (7–6)	Reuss (6–7)	Regan (2)	23,540	36–31
69	June 19	@ Cubs	1–7	Hands (8–8)	Cleveland (6–6)		32,809	36–32
70	June 20	@ Cubs	5–4	Drabowsky (4–0)	Holtzman (6–8)		34,574	37–32
71	June 21	@ Dodgers	0–4	O'Brien (2–1)	Gibson (4–6)		18,480	37–33
72	June 22	@ Dodgers	6–5	Carlton (11–3)	Osteen (8–5)		21,004	38–33
73	June 23	@ Dodgers	3–1	Drabowsky (5–0)	Brewer (3–2)	Shaw (2)	19,910	39–33
74	June 24	@ Dodgers	4–11	Downing (8–4)	Cleveland (6–7)	Peña (1)	19,282	39–34
75	June 25	Cubs	0–12	Bonham (2–1)	Santorini (0–4)		28,743	39–35
76	June 26	Cubs	1–5	Holtzman (7–8)	Gibson (4–7)		43,300	39–36
77	June 27	Cubs	1–4	Jenkins (11–7)	Carlton (11–4)		34,964	39–37
78	June 28	Pirates	5–11	Moose (6–4)	Reuss (6–8)	Grant (7)	15,024	39–38
79	June 29	Pirates	8–3	Cleveland (7–7)	Walker (3–7)		14,586	40–38

July: (18–11)

#	Date	Opponent	Score	Win	Loss	Save	Attendance	Record
80	July 1	@ Giants	7–8	McMahon	Zachary	Johnson	7,794	40–39
81	July 2	@ Giants	7–2	Gibson	Stone		11,268	41–39
82	July 3	@ Giants	1–10	Cumberland	Carlton		24,896	41-40
83	July 4	@ Padres	3–2	Reuss	Arlin	Drabowsky	5,095	42–40
84	July 5	@ Padres	2–3	Miller	Cleveland		4,588	42–41
85	July 7	@ Padres	1–4	Kirby	Gibson		7,456	42–42
86	July 9 (1)	Astros	5–2	Carlton	Forsch			43–42
87	July 9 (2)	Astros	9–5	Reuss	Blasingame	Drabowsky	24,748	44–42
88	July 10	Astros	6–5	Linzy	Gladding		32,895	45–42
89	July 11	Astros	7–3	Gibson	Ray		15,252	46–42
90	July 15 (1)	Expos	7–3	Carlton	Strohmayer			47–42
91	July 15 (2)	Expos	4–6	Stoneman	Reuss		19,409	47–43
92	July 16	Expos	6–0	Cleveland	Renko		23,765	48–43
93	July 17	Expos	3–5	McAnally	Gibson		22,791	48–44
94	July 18	Mets	8–5	Taylor	Matlack	Linzy	27,497	49–44
95	July 19	Mets	2–5	Sadecki	Carlton		20,003	49–45
96	July 20	Phillies	1–5	Short	Reuss		14,650	49–46
97	July 21	Phillies	6–1	Cleveland	Lersch		16,200	50–46
98	July 22	Phillies	8–0	Gibson	Fryman		20,547	51–46
99	July 23	@ Expos	6–2	Zachary	McGinn		20,480	52–46
100	July 24 (1)	@ Expos	8–7	Shaw	Raymond			53–46
101	July 24 (2)	@ Expos	9–3	Reuss	Morton		24,109	54–46
102	July 25	@ Expos	4–5	Stoneman	Cleveland		20,346	54–47
103	July 26	@ Mets	4–0	Gibson	Sadecki		30,586	55–47
104	July 27	@ Mets	2–3	Frisella	Zachary		35,597	55–48
105	July 28	@ Mets	6–3	Carlton	Matlack		30,796	56–48
106	July 29	@ Mets	3–1	Reuss	C. Williams		30,254	57–48
107	July 30	@ Phillies	4–3	Gibson	Short		26,461	58–48
108	July 31	@ Phillies	4–5	Brandon	Drabowsky		19,269	58–49

August: (18–11)

#	Date	Opponent	Score	Win	Loss	Save	Attendance	Record
109	August 1	@ Phillies	9–6	S. Williams	Muñiz		22,432	59–49
110	August 2	Padres	3–1	Carlton	Roberts		13,591	60–49
111	August 3	Padres	1–6	Arlin	Reuss		14,246	60–50
112	August 4	Giants	7–2	Gibson	Perry		27,024	61–50
113	August 5	Giants	3–2	Cleveland	Marichal	Drabowsky	18,641	62–50
114	August 6	Giants	12–8	Shaw	McMahon	Patterson	27,192	63–50
115	August 7	Dodgers	3–2	Linzy	Mikkelsen		36,633	64–50
116	August 8	Dodgers	2–4	Sutton	Reuss	Brewer	45,195	64–51
117	August 9	Dodgers	5–6	Downing	Gibson	Brewer	26,723	64–52
118	August 10	Braves	1–2	Stone	Cleveland	Upshaw	20,921	64–53
119	August 11	Braves	3–9	Kelley	Zachary	McQueen	21,906	64–54
120	August 12	@ Pirates	3–2	Carlton	Walker		21,805	65–54
121	August 13	@ Pirates	2–0	Reuss	Blass		31,563	66–54
122	August 14	@ Pirates	11–0	Gibson	Johnson		30,678	67–54
123	August 15	@ Pirates	6–4	Linzy	Miller	Drabowsky	49,329	68–54
124	August 16	@ Reds	5–6	Carroll	Linzy		13,259	68–55
125	August 17	@ Reds	3–5	Granger	Taylor		14,578	68–56
126	August 18	@ Reds	0–5	Gullett	Gibson		28,228	68–57
127	August 20	@ Braves	5–6	Barber	Shaw		16,099	68–58
128	August 21	@ Braves	5–8	Stone	Carlton		22,451	68–59
129	August 22	@ Braves	13–4	Reuss	Reed	Taylor	19,650	69–59
130	August 23	@ Astros	3–2	Gibson	Wilson		19,167	70–59
131	August 24	@ Astros	2–1	Cleveland	Forsch	Santorini	13,860	71–59
132	August 25	@ Astros	4–1	Carlton	Cook		11,025	72–59
133	August 27	Reds	7–8	Granger	Linzy	Gibbon	33,273	72–60
134	August 28	Reds	4–0	Gibson	Nolan		40,823	73–60
135	August 29	Reds	4–3	Shaw	Granger		28,624	74–60
136	August 30	Mets	3–2	Carlton	Koosman		15,257	75–60
137	August 31	Mets	2–1	Reuss	Frisella		15,854	76–60

September: (14–12)

#	Date	Opponent	Score	Win	Loss	Save	Attendance	Record
138	September 1	Mets	1–7	Seaver	Gibson		22,204	76–61
139	September 3	Cubs	6–1	Cleveland	Hands		26,708	77–61
140	September 4	Cubs	5–7	Pappas	Carlton	Regan	31,807	77–62
141	September 5	Cubs	12–5	Reuss	Jenkins	Taylor	39,309	78–62
142	September 6 (1)	@ Phillies	6–3	Gibson	Wise			79–62
143	September 6 (2)	@ Phillies	1–2	Champion	Zachary	Hoerner	13,193	79–63
144	September 7	@ Phillies	7–5	Shaw	Wilson	Santorini	9,339	80–63
145	September 10	@ Cubs	8–7	S. Williams	Colborn		6,792	81–63
146	September 11	@ Cubs	0–7	Pizarro	Reuss		24,010	81–64
147	September 12	@ Cubs	4–0	Gibson	Holtzman		24,017	82–64
148	September 13	Phillies	5–6	Wilson	Shaw		13,863	82–65
149	September 14	Phillies	4–5	Wise	Zachary	Short	10,640	82–66
150	September 15	@ Pirates	1–4	Ellis	Carlton	Hernández	21,751	82–67
151	September 16	@ Pirates	1–6	Walker	Reuss	Hernández	18,127	82–68
152	September 17	@ Expos	7–2	Gibson	Morton		13,371	83–68
153	September 18	@ Expos	2–4	Stoneman	Cleveland		16,779	83–69
154	September 19	@ Expos	11–0	Carlton	McAnally		25,769	84–69
155	September 21	Pirates	6–4	Drabowsky	Ellis		13,348	85–69
156	September 22	Pirates	1–5	Walker	Gibson	Giusti	14,845	85–70
157	September 23	Pirates	0–5	Briles	Cleveland		10,918	85–71
158	September 24	Expos	10–6	Taylor	Marshall		8,109	86–71
159	September 25	Expos	8–6	Shaw	Morton		9,114	87–71
160	September 26	Expos	7–1	Higgins	Stoneman		11,473	88–71
161	September 27	@ Mets	6–1	S. Williams	Capra	Drabowsky	11,331	89–71
162	September 28	@ Mets	5–2	Carlton	Ryan		3,338	90–71
163	September 30	@ Mets	1–6	Seaver	Patterson		42,344	90–72

=== Opening Day starters ===
- Matty Alou
- Lou Brock
- José Cardenal
- Joe Hague
- Julián Javier
- Jerry Reuss
- Ted Simmons
- Ted Sizemore
- Joe Torre

=== Notable transactions ===
- June 8, 1971: Keith Hernandez was drafted by the Cardinals in the 42nd round of the 1971 Major League Baseball draft.
- June 11, 1971: Leron Lee and Fred Norman were traded by the Cardinals to the San Diego Padres for Al Santorini.
- June 15, 1971: Mike Torrez was traded by the Cardinals to the Montreal Expos for Bob Reynolds.

=== Roster ===
1971 St. Louis Cardinals
Roster
Pitchers: 43 Rudy Arroyo; 34 George Brunet; 32 Steve Carlton; 40 Bob Chlupsa; 22 Reggie Cleveland; 28 Moe Drabowsky; 45 Bob Gibson; 36 Santiago Guzmán; 37 Dennis Higgins; 39 Al Hrabosky; 46 Mike Jackson; 35 Frank Linzy; 47 Fred Norman; 31 Harry Parker; 48 Daryl Patterson; 49 Jerry Reuss; 37 Bob Reynolds; 34 Al Santorini; 44 Don Shaw; 42 Chuck Taylor; 48 Mike Torrez; 21 Stan Williams; 36 Chris Zachary	Catchers: 15 Jerry McNertney; 23 Ted Simmons; 19 Bob Stinson; Infielders: 16 Jim Beauchamp; 10 Bob Burda; 12 Joe Hague; 25 Julián Javier; 1 Ted Kubiak; 27 Dal Maxvill; 29 Milt Ramírez; 11 Dick Schofield; 41 Ted Sizemore; 9 Joe Torre	Outfielders: 17 Matty Alou; 20 Lou Brock; 1 José Cardenal; 38 José Cruz; 37 Leron Lee; 26 Luis Meléndez; 24 Jorge Roque	Manager: 2 Red Schoendienst; Coaches: 8 Vern Benson; 14 Ken Boyer; 3 George Kissell; 33 Barney Schultz; 50 Lee Thomas

== Player stats ==
=== Batting ===
==== Starters by position ====
Note: Pos = Position; G = Games played; AB = At bats; H = Hits; Avg. = Batting average; HR = Home runs; RBI = Runs batted in

Pos	Player	G	AB	H	Avg.	HR	RBI
C	Ted Simmons	133	510	155	.304	7	77
1B	Joe Hague	129	380	86	.226	16	54
2B	Ted Sizemore	135	478	126	.264	3	42
SS	Dal Maxvill	142	356	80	.225	0	24
3B	Joe Torre	161	634	230	.363	24	137
LF	Lou Brock	157	640	200	.313	7	61
CF	José Cruz	83	292	80	.274	9	27
RF	José Cardenal	89	301	73	.243	7	48

==== Other batters ====
Note: G = Games played; AB = At bats; H = Hits; Avg. = Batting average; HR = Home runs; RBI = Runs batted in

Player	G	AB	H	Avg.	HR	RBI
Matty Alou	149	609	192	.315	7	74
Julián Javier	90	259	67	.259	3	28
Luis Meléndez	88	173	39	.225	0	11
Jim Beauchamp	77	162	38	.235	2	16
Jerry McNertney	56	128	37	.289	4	22
Ted Kubiak	32	72	18	.250	1	10
Bob Burda	65	71	21	.296	1	12
Dick Schofield	34	60	13	.217	1	6
Leron Lee	25	28	5	.179	1	2
Bob Stinson	17	19	4	.211	0	1
Milt Ramírez	4	11	3	.273	0	0
Jorge Roque	3	10	3	.300	0	1

=== Pitching ===
==== Starting pitchers ====
Note: G = Games pitched; IP = Innings pitched; W = Wins; L = Losses; ERA = Earned run average; SO = Strikeouts

Player	G	IP	W	L	ERA	SO
Steve Carlton	37	273.1	20	9	3.56	172
Bob Gibson	31	245.2	16	13	3.04	185
Reggie Cleveland	34	222.0	12	12	4.01	148
Jerry Reuss	36	211.0	14	14	4.78	131

==== Other pitchers ====
Note: G = Games pitched; IP = Innings pitched; W = Wins; L = Losses; ERA = Earned run average; SO = Strikeouts

Player	G	IP	W	L	ERA	SO
Chris Zachary	23	89.2	3	10	5.32	48
Al Santorini	19	49.2	0	2	3.81	21
Mike Torrez	9	36.0	1	2	6.00	8
Daryl Patterson	13	26.2	0	1	4.39	11
Santiago Guzmán	2	10.0	0	0	0.00	13

==== Relief pitchers ====
Note: G = Games pitched; W = Wins; L = Losses; SV = Saves; ERA = Earned run average; SO = Strikeouts

Player	G	W	L	SV	ERA	SO
Moe Drabowski	51	6	1	8	3.43	49
Frank Linzy	50	4	3	6	2.12	24
Don Shaw	45	7	2	2	2.65	19
Chuck Taylor	43	3	1	3	3.53	46
Stan Williams	10	3	0	0	1.42	8
Rudy Arroyo	9	0	1	0	5.40	5
George Brunet	7	0	1	0	5.79	4
Bob Reynolds	4	0	0	0	10.29	4
Harry Parker	4	0	0	0	7.20	2
Fred Norman	4	0	0	0	12.27	4
Dennis Higgins	3	1	0	0	3.86	6
Al Hrabosky	1	0	0	0	0.00	2
Bob Chlupsa	1	0	0	0	9.00	1
Mike Jackson	1	0	0	0	0.00	0

== Awards and honors ==
- Lou Brock, National League Stolen Base Leader, 64
- Joe Torre, National League Most Valuable Player
- Joe Torre, Hutch Award

== Farm system ==
Level	Team	League	Manager
AAA	Tulsa Oilers	American Association	Warren Spahn and Gary Geiger
AA	Arkansas Travelers	Texas League	Jack Krol
A	Modesto Reds	California League	Roy Majtyka
A	St. Petersburg Cardinals	Florida State League	Joe Cunningham
A	Cedar Rapids Cardinals	Midwest League	Bobby Dews
Rookie	GCL Cardinals	Gulf Coast League	Tom Burgess

LEAGUE CHAMPIONS: Arkansas
