= Philadelphia Phillies all-time roster (P–Q) =

List of baseball players

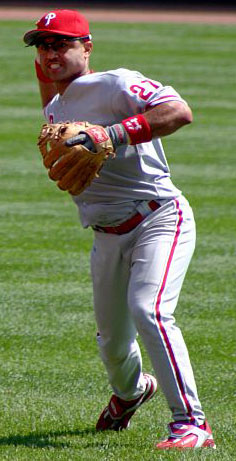
Plácido Polanco played second base for the Phillies from 2002 to 2005, and re-signed with the team in 2010 to play third base.

The Philadelphia Phillies are a Major League Baseball team based in Philadelphia, Pennsylvania. They are a member of the Eastern Division of Major League Baseball's National League. The team has played officially under two names since beginning play in 1883: the current moniker, as well as the "Quakers", which was used in conjunction with "Phillies" during the team's early history. The team was also known unofficially as the "Blue Jays" during the World War II era. Since the franchise's inception, 2,081 players have made an appearance in a competitive game for the team, whether as an offensive player (batting and baserunning) or a defensive player (fielding, pitching, or both).

Of those 2,081 Phillies, 88 have had surnames beginning with the letter P, and 5 beginning with the letter Q. One member of this list has been inducted into the Baseball Hall of Fame; Tony Pérez played for the Phillies during the 1983 season after 18 seasons with 3 other teams. No members of this list have been elected to the Philadelphia Baseball Wall of Fame, nor do they hold any franchise records.

Among the 45 batters in this list, three players share a perfect 1.000 batting average, each in one career at-bat with Philadelphia: first baseman Mike Pasquella, catcher Bill Peterman, and right fielder Ty Pickup. Other players with an average above .300 include Hunter Pence (.324 through 2011), Alex Pitko (.316 in one season), Walter Plock (.400 in one season), and Les Powers (.346 in one season). Plácido Polanco leads all members of this list with 49 home runs, and Dode Paskert's 291 runs batted in (RBI) are best. Of the batters whose surnames begin with Q, Tom Quinlan leads in average (.200), home runs (1), and RBI (3).

Of this list's 43 pitchers, two share 1–0 win–loss records, best in terms of winning percentage; Donn Pall and Clarence Pickrel each won their only decisions as members of the Phillies. Wiley Piatt leads all members of this list with 56 victories, and Ike Pearson's 47 defeats are the most in that statistical category. Robert Person leads this list's pitchers with 535 strikeouts, and infielder Tomás Pérez shares the best earned run average (ERA) with two pitchers—Horacio Piña and Al Porto; all have a 0.00 ERA in their Phillies careers. Among the pitchers whose surnames start with Q, Paul Quantrill leads in winning percentage (.481; a 13–14 record), ERA (4.86), and strikeouts (116).

Key to symbols in player list(s)
† or ‡	Indicates a member of the National Baseball Hall of Fame and Museum; ‡ indicates that the Phillies are the player's primary team^{[H]}
§	Indicates a member of the Philadelphia Baseball Wall of Fame
*	Indicates a team record^{[R]}
(#)	A number following a player's name indicates that the number was retired by the Phillies in the player's honor.
Year	Italic text indicates that the player is a member of the Phillies' active (25-man) roster.
Position(s)	Indicates the player's primary position(s)^{[P]}
Notes	Statistics shown only for playing time with Phillies^{[S]}
Ref	References

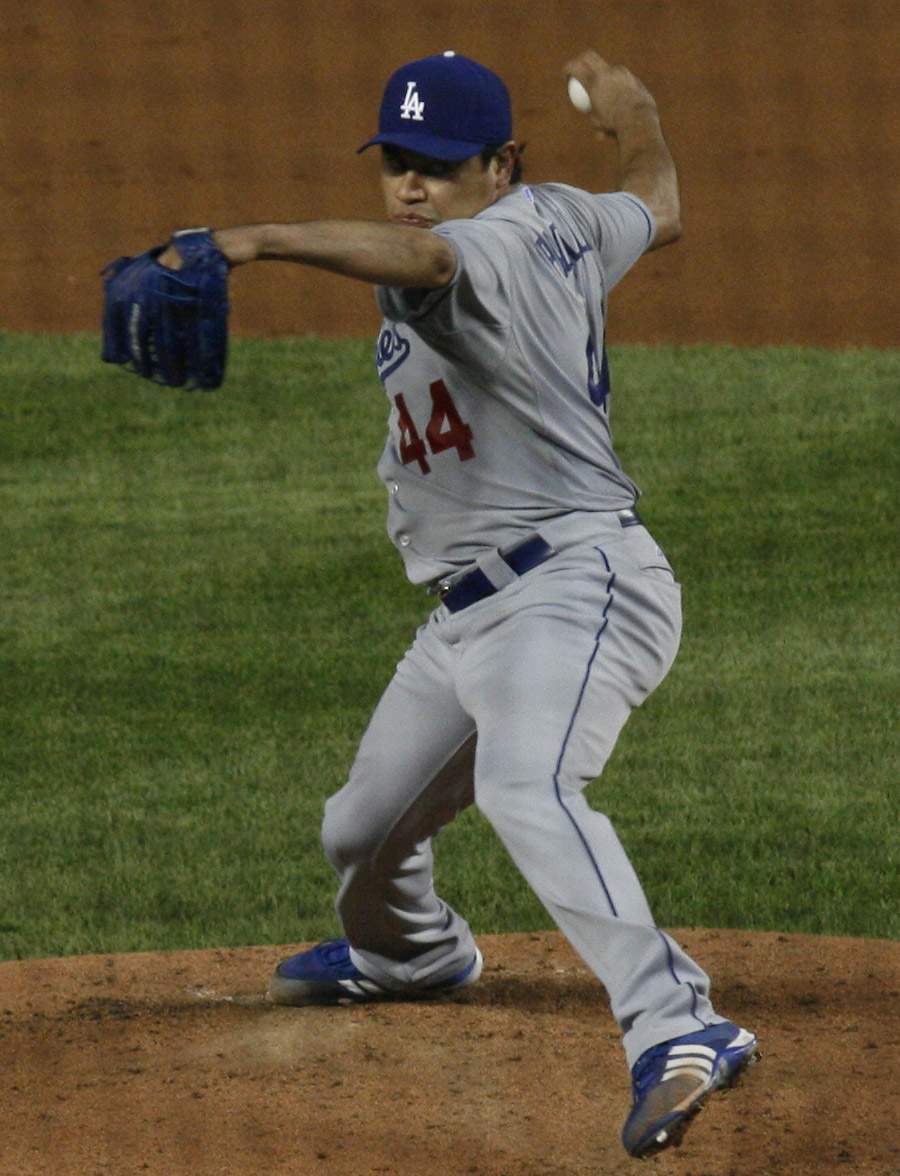
Vicente Padilla posted a .500 winning percentage with 49 wins and 49 losses in 6 seasons.

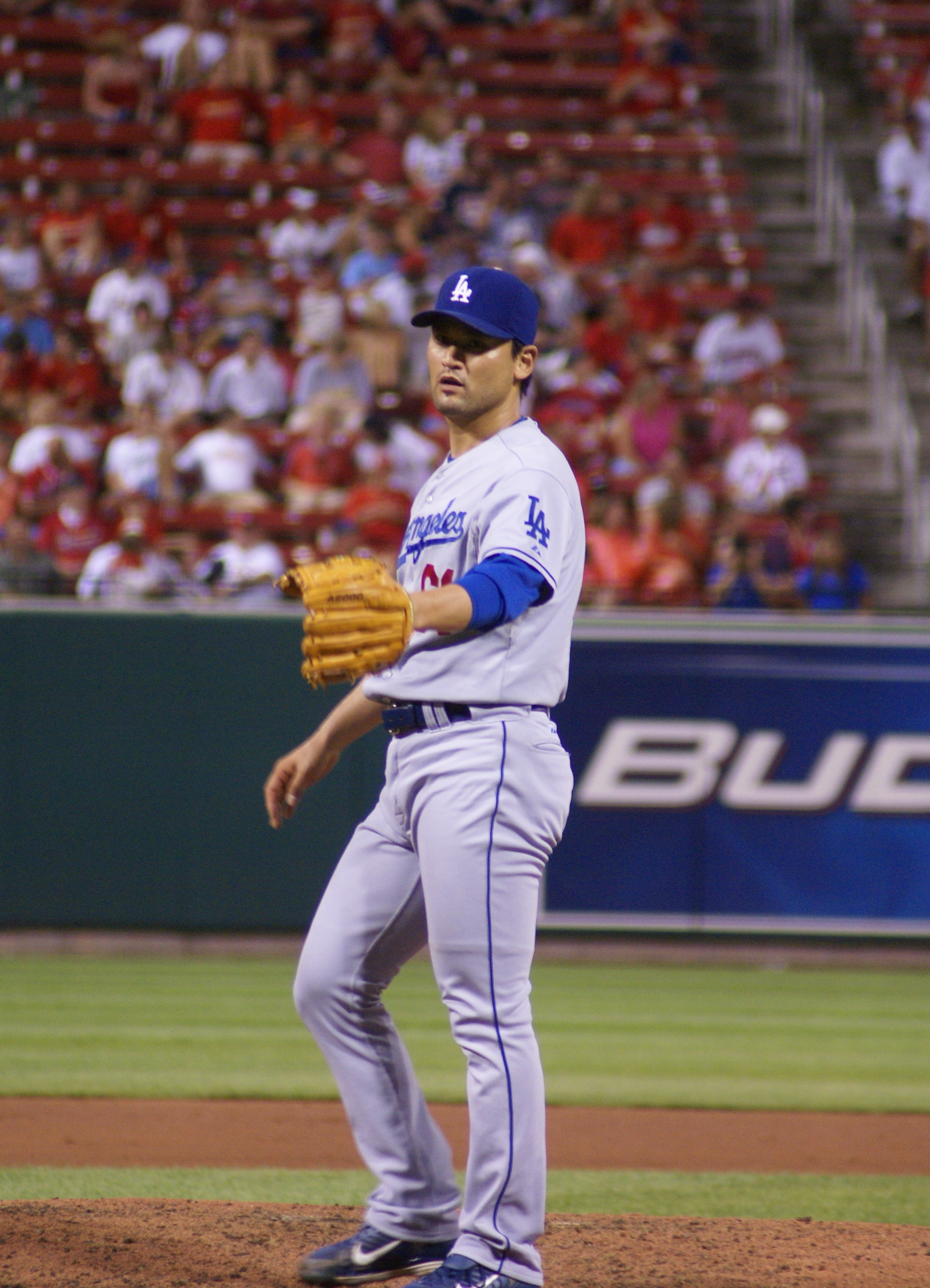
Chan Ho Park won three games and lost three in his only season with Philadelphia.

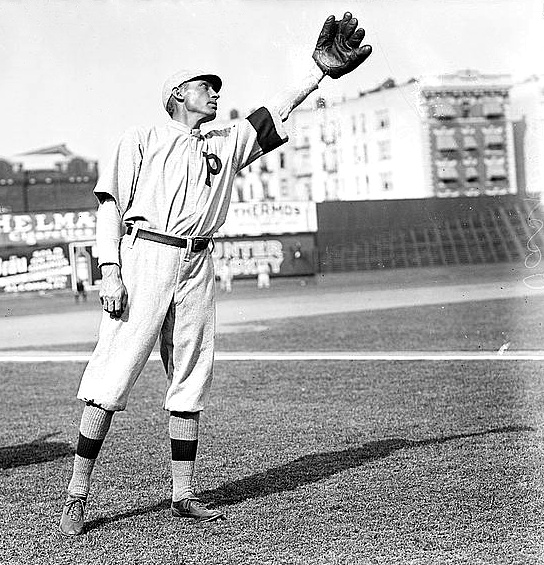
In seven seasons with the Phillies, Dode Paskert compiled a .272 batting average.

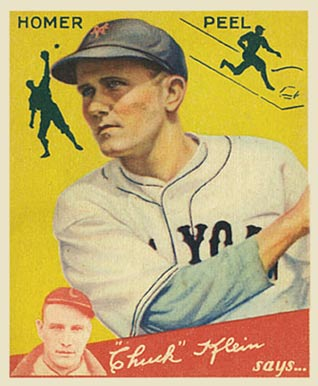
Homer Peel batted in 19 runs in his only Phillies year.

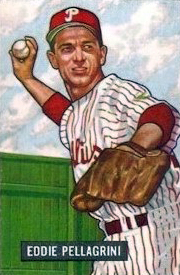
Eddie Pellagrini played second base for Philadelphia in 1951.

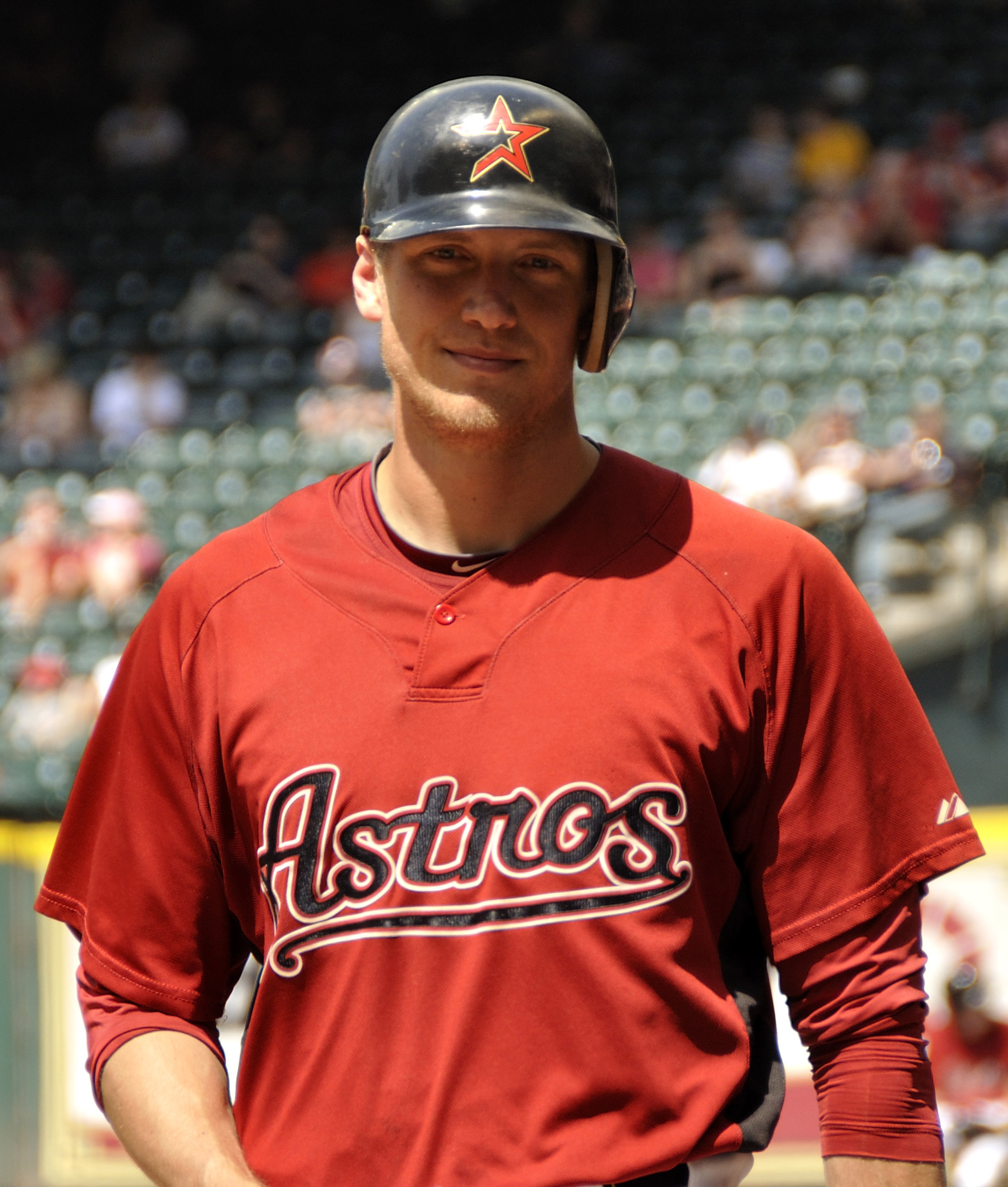
Hunter Pence joined the Phillies at the 2011 trade deadline.

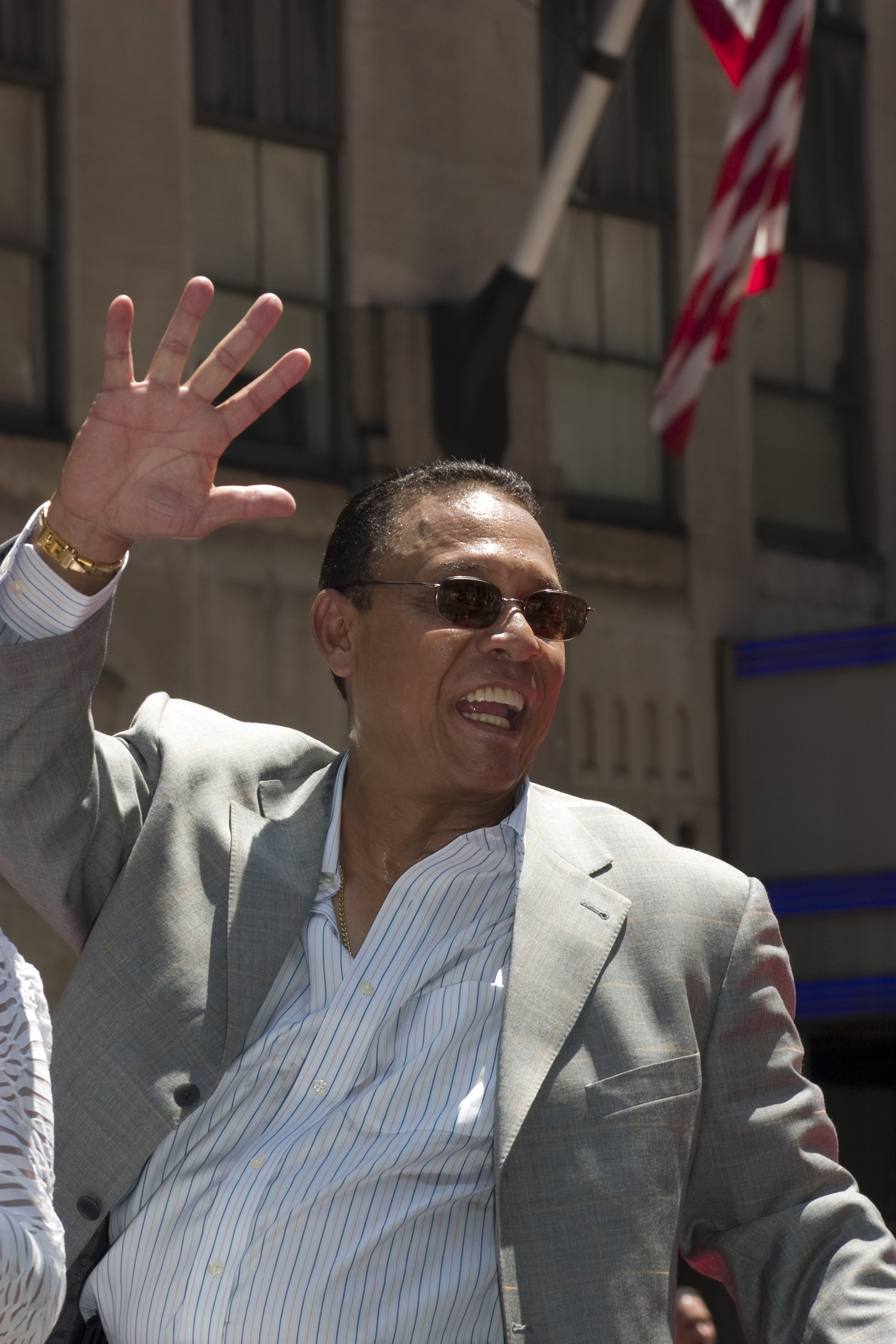
Tony Pérez played one season for the Phillies, hitting six home runs.

Dave Philley was a right fielder and first baseman for Philadelphia from 1958 to 1960.

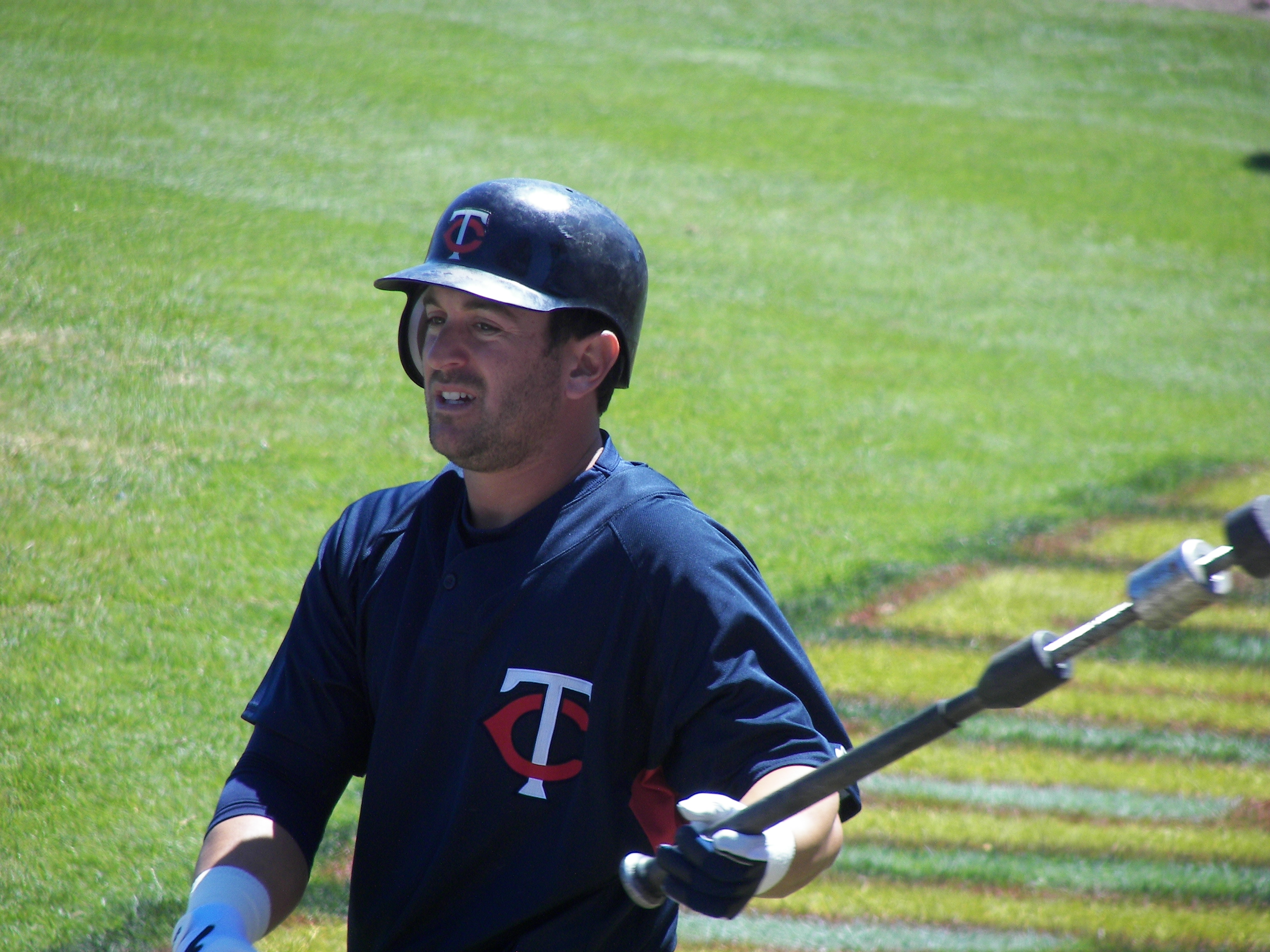
Infielder Nick Punto played for the Phillies from 2001 to 2003.

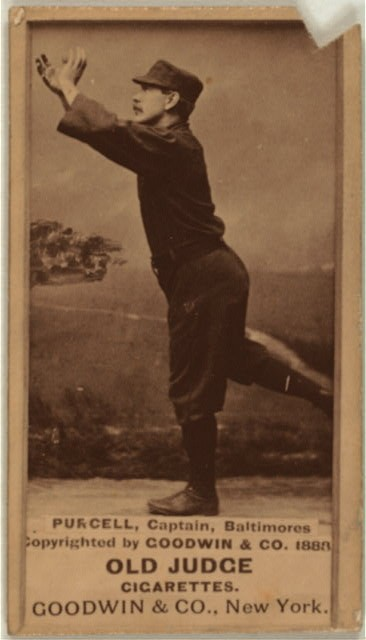
Left fielder Blondie Purcell was a member of Philadelphia's club in its first two seasons.

List of players whose surnames begin with P, showing season(s) and position(s) played and selected statistics
Name	Season(s)	Position(s)	Notes	Ref
Gene Packard	1919	Pitcher	6–8 record; 4.15 earned run average; 24 strikeouts	
Cristian Pache	2023–2024	Left fielder Center fielder	.218 batting average; 20 runs batted in; 21 runs scored	
Tom Padden	1943	Catcher	.293 batting average; 1 run batted in; 5 runs scored	
Don Padgett	1947–1948	Catcher	.289 batting average; 12 extra-base hits; 31 runs batted in	
Vicente Padilla	2000–2005	Pitcher	49–49 record; 3.98 earned run average; 496 strikeouts	
José Pagán	1973	Third baseman	.205 batting average; 5 doubles; 5 runs batted in	
Andrew Painter	2026 -Present	Pitcher		
Donn Pall	1993	Pitcher	1–0 record; 2.55 earned run average; 11 strikeouts	
David Palmer	1988	Pitcher	7–9 record; 4.47 earned run average; 85 strikeouts	
Lowell Palmer	1969–1971	Pitcher	3–10 record; 5.39 earned run average; 159 strikeouts	
Stan Palys	1953–1955	Right fielder	.276 batting average; 1 home runs; 8 runs batted in	
Al Pardo	1988–1989	Catcher	.000 batting average; 2 strikeouts; 3 plate appearances	
Mark Parent	1997–1998	Catcher	.186 batting average; 1 home run; 21 runs batted in	
Chan Ho Park	2009	Pitcher	3–3 record; 4.43 earned run average; 73 strikeouts	
Dixie Parker	1923	Catcher	.200 batting average; 1 run batted in; 5 plate appearances	
Frank Parkinson	1921–1924	Second baseman Shortstop	.256 batting average; 24 home runs; 149 runs batted in	
Jeff Parrett	1989–1990; 1996	Pitcher	17–16 record; 3.71 earned run average; 189 strikeouts	
Sam Parrilla	1970	Left fielder	.125 batting average; 1 double; 4 plate appearances	
Lance Parrish	1987–1988	Catcher	.230 batting average; 32 home runs; 127 runs batted in	
Dode Paskert	1911–1917	Center fielder	.272 batting average; 28 home runs; 291 runs batted in	
Mike Pasquella	1919	First baseman	1.000 batting average; 1 hit; 1 run scored	
Claude Passeau	1936–1939	Pitcher	38–55 record; 4.15 earned run average; 349 strikeouts	
Gene Paulette	1919–1920	First baseman	.280 batting average; 2 home runs; 67 runs batted in	
Johnny Peacock	1944–1945	Catcher	.220 batting average; 18 extra-base hits; 27 runs batted in	
Frank Pearce	1933–1935	Pitcher	5–6 record; 4.77 earned run average; 29 strikeouts	
Harry Pearce	1917–1919	Second baseman	.208 batting average; 14 extra-base hits; 29 runs batted in	
Ike Pearson	1939–1942; 1946	Pitcher	11–47 record; 4.82 earned run average; 137 strikeouts	
Homer Peel	1929	Center fielder	.269 batting average; 13 extra-base hits; 19 runs batted in	
Julio Peguero	1992	Center fielder Right fielder	.222 batting average; 2 hits; 3 runs scored	
Eddie Pellagrini	1951	Second baseman	.234 batting average; 5 home runs; 30 runs batted in	
Roberto Peña	1968	Shortstop	.260 batting average; 1 home run; 38 runs batted in	
Hunter Pence	2011	Right fielder	.324 batting average; 11 home runs; 35 runs batted in	
Paul Penson	1954	Pitcher	1–1 record; 4.50 earned run average; 3 strikeouts	
Luis Peraza	1969	Pitcher	6.00 earned run average; 7 strikeouts; 2 walks	
Juan Pérez	2011	Pitcher	1–0 record; 3.60 earned run average; 8 strikeouts	
Tomás Pérez	2000–2005	Second baseman Third baseman	.249 batting average; 20 home runs; 128 runs batted in	
Tony Pérez^{†}	1983	First baseman	.241 batting average; 6 home runs; 43 runs batted in	
Yorkis Pérez	1998–1999	Pitcher	3–3 record; 3.86 earned run average; 68 strikeouts	
Robert Person	1999–2002	Pitcher	38–24 record; 4.23 earned run average; 535 strikeouts	
Bill Peterman	1942	Catcher	1.000 batting average; 1 hit; 1 plate appearance	
John Peters	1921–1922	Catcher	.268 batting average; 7 home runs; 47 runs batted in	
Kent Peterson	1952–1953	Pitcher	0–1 record; 5.29 earned run average; 27 strikeouts	
Leon Pettit	1937	Pitcher	0–1 record; 11.25 earned run average; 4 walks	
Pretzel Pezzullo	1935–1936	Pitcher	3–5 record; 6.36 earned run average; 24 strikeouts	
Bobby Pfeil	1971	Third baseman	.271 batting average; 2 home runs; 9 runs batted in	
Dave Philley	1958–1960	Right fielder First baseman	.300 batting average; 10 home runs; 72 runs batted in	
Adolfo Phillips	1964–1966	Center fielder	.223 batting average; 3 home runs; 5 runs batted in	
Buz Phillips	1930	Pitcher	8.04 earned run average; 9 strikeouts; 18 walks	
J. R. Phillips	1996	Right fielder First baseman	.152 batting average; 5 home runs; 10 runs batted in	
Taylor Phillips	1959–1960	Pitcher	1–5 record; 5.61 earned run average; 41 strikeouts	
Wiley Piatt	1898–1900	Pitcher	56–39 record; 3.59 earned run average; 257 strikeouts	
Nick Picciuto	1945	Third baseman	.135 batting average; 6 runs batted in; 7 runs scored	
Clarence Pickrel	1933	Pitcher	1–0 record; 3.95 earned run average; 6 strikeouts	
Ty Pickup	1918	Right fielder	1.000 batting average; 1 hit; 1 plate appearance	
Ray Pierce	1925–1926	Pitcher	7–11 record; 5.56 earned run average; 36 strikeouts	
Duane Pillette	1956	Pitcher	6.56 earned run average; 10 strikeouts; 12 walks	
Horacio Piña	1978	Pitcher	0.00 earned run average; 4 strikeouts; 2 1/3 innings pitched	
Lerton Pinto	1922; 1924	Pitcher	0–1 record; 5.65 earned run average; 5 strikeouts	
Jim Pirie	1883	Shortstop	.158 batting average; 3 hits; 1 run scored	
Alex Pitko	1938	Right fielder	.316 batting average; 2 runs batted in; 2 runs scored	
Togie Pittinger	1905–1907	Pitcher	40–29 record; 3.15 earned run average; 216 strikeouts	
Erik Plantenberg	1997	Pitcher	4.91 earned run average; 12 strikeouts; 12 walks	
Dan Plesac	2002–2003	Pitcher	4–2 record; 3.51 earned run average; 64 strikeouts	
Walter Plock	1891	Center fielder	.400 batting average; 2 hits; 2 runs scored	
Johnny Podgajny	1940–1943	Pitcher	20–33 record; 4.14 earned run average; 118 strikeouts	
John Poff	1979	Left fielder	.105 batting average; 1 double; 1 run batted in	
Jennings Poindexter	1939	Pitcher	4.15 earned run average; 12 strikeouts; 15 walks	
Plácido Polanco	2002–2005; 2010–2011	Second baseman Third baseman	.293 batting average; 49 home runs; 262 runs batted in	
Hugh Poland	1947	Catcher	.000 batting average; 8 plate appearances	
Cliff Politte	1999–2002	Pitcher	9–6 record; 3.93 earned run average; 103 strikeouts	
Jim Poole	1999	Pitcher	1–1 record; 4.33 earned run average; 22 strikeouts	
Al Porto	1948	Pitcher	1 strikeout; 1 walk; 4 innings pitched	
Mark Portugal	1997–1998	Pitcher	10–7 record; 4.45 earned run average; 106 strikeouts	
Lou Possehl	1946–1948; 1951–1952	Pitcher	2–5 record; 5.26 earned run average; 22 strikeouts	
Wally Post	1958–1960	Right fielder	.269 batting average; 36 home runs; 168 runs batted in	
Brian Powell	2004	Pitcher	1–2 record; 5.03 earned run average; 24 strikeouts	
Jake Powell	1945	Right fielder	.231 batting average; 1 home run; 14 runs batted in	
Vic Power	1964	First baseman	.208 batting average; 3 runs batted in; 1 run scored	
Les Powers	1939	First baseman	.346 batting average; 2 extra-base hits; 2 runs batted in	
Todd Pratt	1992–1994; 2001–2005	Catcher	.256 batting average; 28 home runs; 114 runs batted in	
Mike Prendergast	1918–1919	Pitcher	13–15 record; 3.20 earned run average; 46 strikeouts	
Ray Prim	1935	Pitcher	3–4 record; 5.77 earned run average; 27 strikeouts	
Tom Prince	1999–2000	Catcher	.234 batting average; 2 home runs; 16 runs batted in	
Chris Pritchett	2000	First baseman	.091 batting average; 1 hit; 12 plate appearances	
Mike Proly	1981	Pitcher	2–1 record; 3.86 earned run average; 19 strikeouts	
Hub Pruett	1927–1928	Pitcher	9–21 record; 5.63 earned run average; 125 strikeouts	
Troy Puckett	1911	Pitcher	13.50 earned run average; 1 strikeout; 2 walks	
Nick Punto	2001–2003	Second baseman	.223 batting average; 1 home run; 4 runs batted in	
Blondie Purcell	1883–1884	Left fielder	.260 batting average; 2 home runs; 63 runs batted in	
Jesse Purnell	1904	Third baseman	.105 batting average; 1 run batted in; 2 runs scored	
Shadow Pyle	1884	Pitcher	0–1 record; 4.00 earned run average; 4 strikeouts	

List of players whose surnames begin with Q, showing season(s) and position(s) played and selected statistics
Name	Season(s)	Position(s)	Notes	Ref
Tom Qualters	1953; 1957–1958	Pitcher	12.10 earned run average; 6 strikeouts; 6 walks	
Paul Quantrill	1994–1995	Pitcher	13–14 record; 4.86 earned run average; 116 strikeouts	
Tom Quinlan	1994	Third baseman	.200 batting average; 1 home run; 3 runs batted in	
John Quinn	1911	Catcher	.000 batting average; 2 plate appearances	
Rafael Quirico	1996	Pitcher	0–1 record; 37.80 earned run average; 1 strikeout	

== Footnotes ==
Key

- ^{H} The National Baseball Hall of Fame and Museum determines which cap a player wears on their plaque, signifying "the team with which he made his most indelible mark". The Hall of Fame considers the player's wishes in making their decision, but the Hall makes the final decision as "it is important that the logo be emblematic of the historical accomplishments of that player’s career".
- ^{P} Players are listed at a position if they appeared in 30% of their games or more during their Phillies career, as defined by Baseball-Reference. Additional positions may be shown on the Baseball-Reference website by following each player's citation.
- ^{R} Franchise batting and pitching leaders are drawn from Baseball-Reference. A total of 1,500 plate appearances are needed to qualify for batting records, and 500 innings pitched or 50 decisions are required to qualify for pitching records.
- ^{S} Statistics are correct as of the end of the 2010 Major League Baseball season.
