= Bill Wilson (pitcher) =

American baseball player (1942-1993)

- Pitcher
- Born: September 21, 1942; Pomeroy, Ohio, U.S.
- Died: August 11, 1993 (aged 50); Broken Arrow, Oklahoma, U.S.
- Batted: Right Threw: Right

MLB debut
- April 8, 1969, for the Philadelphia Phillies

Last MLB appearance
- September 26, 1973, for the Philadelphia Phillies

MLB statistics
- Win–loss record: 9–15
- Earned run average: 4.22
- Strikeouts: 171
- Stats at Baseball Reference

Teams
- Philadelphia Phillies (1969–1973)

William Harlan Wilson (September 19, 1942 – August 11, 1993) was an American professional baseball player who appeared in 179 games over all or part of five seasons in Major League Baseball for the Philadelphia Phillies from 1969 to 1973. He was born in Pomeroy, Ohio and attended Pomeroy High School, and then attended Marshall University. A pitcher, he threw and batted right-handed, stood 6 feet 2 inches (1.88 m) tall and weighed 195 pounds (88 kg).

Wilson's pro career lasted for 13 years, 1962–1974, all in the Philadelphia organization. He spent seven seasons in the minor leagues before making the Phillies' roster at the outset of the 1969 campaign. Pitching for Phillie teams that averaged 94 losses per season over Wilson's tenure, he compiled a 9–15 won–lost record with 17 career saves and a 4.22 earned run average in the majors. In 258 total innings pitched, Wilson allowed 229 hits and 131 bases on balls, with 171 strikeouts. All of his 179 major league games came as a relief pitcher, but Wilson also played for one-third of an inning as a third baseman as part of a one-batter defensive substitution strategy by Phils' manager Frank Lucchesi during a game in August of 1971.

== Played third base against one batter ==
On August 6, 1971, against the Pittsburgh Pirates at Three Rivers Stadium, Wilson entered the game in relief of Ken Reynolds in the bottom of the seventh inning with the Phils trailing, 2–1. He held the Pirates scoreless that inning and returned to the mound in the eighth after the Phillies had taken a 3–2 lead on a home run from Willie Montañez. Wilson retired future Baseball Hall of Famer Roberto Clemente on a ground ball to start the inning. But with another future Hall of Famer, left-handed swinging Willie Stargell, due up next, manager Lucchesi brought in a left-handed relief pitcher, Joe Hoerner, to face him. Instead of removing Wilson from the game, however, Lucchesi moved him to third base, where he replaced Terry Harmon. Hoerner then struck out Stargell (denying Wilson a fielding chance at the hot corner) and left the game. Wilson returned to the mound (while Bobby Pfeil came off the bench to take over at third base) and got Manny Sanguillén on another ground ball. He then capped off the memorable day by retiring the Pirates in the ninth inning to gain his third victory of the season.

Wilson died from cancer in 1993 in Broken Arrow, Oklahoma. Survivors included daughter Kim Wilson-Davis and two grandchildren, Joseph and Terry Davis, of Schuylkill County, Pennsylvania.
