= Clarence Pickrel =

American baseball player (1911–1983)

- Pickrel with the Braves in 1934
- Pitcher
- Born: March 28, 1911; Gretna, Virginia, U.S.
- Died: November 4, 1983 (aged 72); Rocky Mount, Virginia, U.S.
- Batted: Right Threw: Right

MLB debut
- April 22, 1933, for the Philadelphia Phillies

Last MLB appearance
- June 12, 1934, for the Boston Braves

MLB statistics
- Win–loss record: 1–0
- Earned run average: 4.55
- Strikeouts: 15
- Stats at Baseball Reference

Teams
- Philadelphia Phillies (1933); Boston Braves (1934)

Clarence Douglas Pickrel (March 28, 1911 – April 11, 1983) was an American professional baseball player. In a 12-year professional career, Pickrel played two seasons as a Major League Baseball pitcher: in 1933 with the Philadelphia Phillies; and in 1934 with the Boston Braves. He was officially listed as standing 6 feet 1 inch (185 cm) and weighing 180 pounds (82 kg).

== Biography ==
=== Early life ===
Pickrel was born in Gretna, Virginia, on March 28, 1911.

=== Playing career ===
In 1931, Pickrel began his professional baseball career pitching for the A-level Durham Bulls in North Carolina; his 12 wins and 14 losses were the second-highest totals on the team in both categories. He led the club with 232 innings pitched and 118 walks. As a hitter, he posted a .153 batting average, including one double and one triple. He moved up to the Texas League, at the double-A level, the following season, posting his first professional winning season for the Fort Worth Cats with a 6–4 win–loss record. His earned run average (ERA) was 4.17 (50 earned runs allowed in 108 innings), and he worked primarily out of the bullpen, making only 7 starts in 31 appearances.

Pickrel played for three teams in 1933, including the Harrisburg Senators of the New York–Penn League, where he went 1–6 for the Boston-affiliated club with a 5.47 ERA in 51 innings, and the Baltimore Orioles of the International League, a double-A club, where he won one game and lost one in three appearances. Pickrel also appeared in nine contests for the Philadelphia Phillies, making his major league debut with a scoreless inning on April 22, when he allowed two baserunners via a hit and a walk. He allowed two runs on May 27 in relief of Phil Collins, when the starter permitted the St. Louis Cardinals to score eight runs on fourteen hits in four innings. On June 2, Pickrel allowed four runs (three earned) to the New York Giants on four hits without recording an out, but followed that with two scoreless outings on June 4 and 15. He gave up a run on four hits to the Boston Braves in the first game of a June 17 doubleheader, and finished the 1933 season with three scoreless outings.

In April 1934, Pickrel opened that season with the Braves, pitching three scoreless innings against the Brooklyn Dodgers, walking one batter and striking out two. In his next appearance against the Dodgers, Pickrel started the game, allowing 4 runs on 5 hits in 2 1/3 innings. He allowed runs in four consecutive appearances, the second of which came against the Chicago Cubs on May 4, when he gave up two runs in a single inning. After allowing lone runs to the Cincinnati Reds and the Giants, Pickrel posted three consecutive scoreless appearances before completing his Boston tenure with a one-inning, one-run contest against the Cardinals on June 12. For the major league portion of the season, he struck out nine batters and walked seven, allowing nine runs. He also played for the Syracuse Chiefs of the International League during that year, posting a 9–11 record and a 5.03 ERA in 154 innings.

Pickrel played with the Seattle Indians of the Pacific Coast League—one of that organization's founding member teams—in 1935. He amassed a 6–16 record while appearing in 44 games, the team's third-highest total. His 5.16 ERA was collected in 176 innings, in which he walked 75 batters. In 1936, he played a portion of the year with Seattle, winning three games and losing one in ten games, but made 32 appearances for the Tulsa Oilers, collecting a 9–8 record and a 5.03 ERA. The following two seasons were spent entirely with Seattle; in 1937, Pickrel posted career highs in wins (16) and losses (17), pitching 266 innings. His 165 runs (129 earned) and 52 games were career highs, and his 281 hits allowed were second only to his first professional season. The following year, his 8–8 record was accompanied by a 4.47 ERA and 65 walks in 32 games.

In 1939, Pickrel split time between Seattle and the Portland Beavers, posting a 7–10 record on the season with a 4.74 ERA. He returned to Tulsa in 1940, losing two games and winning none with a 6.23 ERA. He also played a short time with Portland, losing one of his seven appearances. Pickrel's final season was 1941, and he played for the Petersburg Rebels of the Virginia League, where he collected a .250 winning percentage by earning one victory and three defeats; he posted a 4.50 ERA in 40 innings.

=== After baseball ===
Pickrel died on November 4, 1983, in Rocky Mount, Virginia, and was interred in Gretna Burial Park in his hometown.

== See also ==
- Philadelphia Phillies all-time roster (P–Q)
