= 1971 Atlanta Braves season =

1971 Atlanta Braves
- League: National League
- Division: West
- Ballpark: Atlanta Stadium
- City: Atlanta
- Record: 82–80 (.506)
- Divisional place: 3rd
- Owners: William Bartholomay
- General managers: Paul Richards
- Managers: Lum Harris
- Television: WSB-TV
- Radio: WSB (Ernie Johnson, Milo Hamilton)

The 1971 Atlanta Braves season was the sixth season in Atlanta along with the 101st season as a franchise overall.

== Offseason ==
- November 30, 1970: Hal Breeden was traded by the Braves to the Chicago Cubs for Hoyt Wilhelm.
- December 2, 1970: Bob Tillman was traded by the Braves to the Milwaukee Brewers for Hank Allen, John Ryan (minors) and Paul Click (minors).
- December 22, 1970: Don Cardwell was released by the Braves.

== Regular season ==
=== Season standings ===
NL West
Team	W	L	Pct.	GB	Home	Road
San Francisco Giants	90	72	.556	—	51‍–‍30	39‍–‍42
Los Angeles Dodgers	89	73	.549	1	42‍–‍39	47‍–‍34
Atlanta Braves	82	80	.506	8	43‍–‍39	39‍–‍41
Cincinnati Reds	79	83	.488	11	46‍–‍35	33‍–‍48
Houston Astros	79	83	.488	11	39‍–‍42	40‍–‍41
San Diego Padres	61	100	.379	28½	33‍–‍48	28‍–‍52

=== Record vs. opponents ===
1971 National League record Sources:
Team	ATL	CHC	CIN	HOU	LAD	MON	NYM	PHI	PIT	SD	SF	STL
Atlanta	—	5–7	9–9	9–9	9–9	7–5	7–5	8–4	4–8	11–7	7–11	6–6
Chicago	7–5	—	6–6	5–7	8–4	8–10	11–7	11–7	6–12	9–3	3–9	9–9
Cincinnati	9–9	6–6	—	5–13	7–11	7–5	8–4	5–7	5–7	10–8	9–9	8–4
Houston	9–9	7–5	13–5	—	8–10	4–8	5–7	8–4	4–8	10–8	9–9	2–10
Los Angeles	9–9	4–8	11–7	10–8	—	8–4	5–7	7–5	4–8	13–5	12–6	6–6
Montreal	5–7	10–8	5–7	8–4	4–8	—	9–9	6–12	7–11	6–5	7–5	4–14
New York	5–7	7–11	4–8	7–5	7–5	9–9	—	13–5	10–8	7–5	4–8	10–8
Philadelphia	4-8	7–11	2–10	3–9	5–7	6–10	5–13	—	6–12	4–8	6–6	7–11
Pittsburgh	8–4	12–6	7–5	8–4	8–4	11–7	8–10	12–6	—	9–3	3–9	11–7
San Diego	7–11	3–9	8–10	8–10	5–13	5–6	5–7	8–4	3–9	—	5–13	4–8
San Francisco	11–7	9–3	9–9	9–9	6–12	5–7	8–4	6–6	9–3	13–5	—	5–7
St. Louis	6–6	9–9	4–8	10–2	6–6	14–4	8–10	11–7	7–11	8–4	7–5	—

=== Notable transactions ===
- April 1971: Hank Allen was released by the Braves.
- April 16, 1971: Luis Tiant was signed as a free agent by the Braves.
- May 15, 1971: Luis Tiant was released by the Braves.
- June 2, 1971: Clete Boyer was released by the Braves.
- June 8, 1971: 1971 Major League Baseball draft
  - Biff Pocoroba was drafted by the Braves in the 17th round.
  - Mike Beard was drafted by the Braves in the 1st round (18th pick) of the secondary phase.
- June 29, 1971: Hoyt Wilhelm was released by the Braves.

=== Roster ===
1971 Atlanta Braves
Roster
Pitchers: 24 Steve Barber; 29 Ron Herbel; 39 Tom House; 33 Pat Jarvis; 36 Tom Kelley; 22 Mike McQueen; 23 Jim Nash; 31 Gary Neibauer; 35 Phil Niekro; 37 Bob Priddy; 38 Ron Reed; 40 George Stone; 34 Cecil Upshaw; 39 Hoyt Wilhelm	Catchers: 4 Bob Didier; 15 Hal King; 32 Earl Williams; Infielders: 44 Hank Aaron; 18 Tommie Aaron; 6 Clete Boyer; 2 Jim Breazeale; 30 Orlando Cepeda; 11 Darrell Evans; 14 Leo Foster; 7 Gil Garrido; 6 Tony La Russa; 17 Félix Millán; 9 Marty Perez; 14 Marv Staehle; 18 Zoilo Versalles	Outfielders: 12 Dusty Baker; 45 Oscar Brown; 48 Ralph Garr; 16 Sonny Jackson; 28 Mike Lum	Manager: 26 Lum Harris; Coaches: 8 Jim Busby; 5 Harry Dorish; 41 Eddie Mathews; 3 Ken Silvestri

== Player stats ==
=== Batting ===
==== Starters by position ====
Note: Pos = Position; G = Games played; AB = At bats; H = Hits; Avg. = Batting average; HR = Home runs; RBI = Runs batted in

Pos	Player	G	AB	H	Avg.	HR	RBI
C	Earl Williams	145	497	129	.260	33	87
1B	Hank Aaron	139	495	162	.327	47	118
2B	Félix Millán	143	577	167	.289	2	45
SS	Marty Perez	130	410	93	.227	4	32
3B	Darrell Evans	89	260	63	.242	12	38
LF	Ralph Garr	154	639	219	.343	9	44
CF	Sonny Jackson	149	547	141	.258	2	25
RF	Mike Lum	145	454	122	.269	13	55

==== Other batters ====
Note: G = Games played; AB = At bats; H = Hits; Avg. = Batting average; HR = Home runs; RBI = Runs batted in

Player	G	AB	H	Avg.	HR	RBI
Orlando Cepeda	71	250	69	.276	14	44
Hal King	86	198	41	.207	5	19
Zoilo Versalles	66	194	37	.191	5	22
Bob Didier	51	155	34	.219	0	5
Gil Garrido	79	125	27	.216	0	12
Clete Boyer	30	98	24	.245	6	19
Dusty Baker	29	62	14	.226	0	4
Tommie Aaron	25	53	12	.226	0	3
Oscar Brown	27	43	9	.209	0	5
Marv Staehle	22	36	4	.111	0	1
Jim Breazeale	10	21	4	.190	1	3
Leo Foster	9	10	0	.000	0	0
Tony La Russa	9	7	2	.286	0	0

=== Pitching ===
==== Starting pitchers ====
Note: G = Games pitched; IP = Innings pitched; W = Wins; L = Losses; ERA = Earned run average; SO = Strikeouts

Player	G	IP	W	L	ERA	SO
Phil Niekro	42	268.2	15	14	2.98	173
Ron Reed	32	222.1	13	14	3.72	129
George Stone	27	172.2	6	8	3.60	110
Tom Kelley	28	143.0	9	5	2.96	68

==== Other pitchers ====
Note: G = Games pitched; IP = Innings pitched; W = Wins; L = Losses; ERA = Earned run average; SO = Strikeouts

Player	G	IP	W	L	ERA	SO
Pat Jarvis	35	162.1	6	14	4.10	68
Jim Nash	32	133.0	9	7	4.94	65
Gary Neibauer	6	21.0	1	0	2.14	6

==== Relief pitchers ====
Note: G = Games pitched; W = Wins; L = Losses; SV = Saves; ERA = Earned run average; SO = Strikeouts

Player	G	W	L	SV	ERA	SO
Bob Priddy	40	4	9	4	4.22	36
Steve Barber	39	3	1	2	4.80	40
Ron Herbel	25	0	1	1	5.23	22
Mike McQueen	17	4	1	1	3.54	38
Tom House	11	1	0	0	3.05	11
Hoyt Wilhelm	3	0	0	0	15.43	1

== Farm system ==
Level	Team	League	Manager
AAA	Richmond Braves	International League	Clyde King
AA	Savannah Braves	Southern League	Eddie Haas
A	Greenwood Braves	Western Carolinas League	Clint Courtney
Rookie	Wytheville Braves	Appalachian League	Paul Snyder

LEAGUE CHAMPIONS: Greenwood
