= Mike Pasquella =

American baseball player (1898–1965)

- Pasquella with the Waco Navigators
- First baseman
- Born: November 7, 1898; Philadelphia, Pennsylvania, U.S.
- Died: April 5, 1965 (aged 66); Bridgeport, Connecticut, U.S.
- Batted: Right Threw: Right

MLB debut
- July 9, 1919, for the Philadelphia Phillies

Last MLB appearance
- July 31, 1919, for the St. Louis Cardinals

MLB statistics
- Batting average: .500
- Hits: 1
- Stats at Baseball Reference

Teams
- Philadelphia Phillies (1919); St. Louis Cardinals (1919)

Michael John Pasquella (November 7, 1898 – April 5, 1965), nicknamed "Toney", was an American professional baseball player for one season. In 1919, he played for the Philadelphia Phillies and St. Louis Cardinals of Major League Baseball's National League. He was officially listed as standing 5 feet 11 inches (180 cm) and weighing 167 pounds (76 kg).

== Biography ==
Pasquella was born "Michael John Pasquariello" on November 7, 1898, in Philadelphia, Pennsylvania. He attended college at Villanova University, one of 48 players to attend that school.

Pasquella appeared for three teams during the 1919 season: two major league clubs and one in the minor leagues. As a minor leaguer, Pasquella played in 46 games for the Waco Navigators of the Texas League as a backup at first base to Roy Leslie. In the field, he recorded a .991 fielding percentage, making 444 putouts, 17 assists, and 4 errors. As a hitter, Pasquella batted .202 with seven doubles and a home run. When he played in the major leagues, he appeared first for the Philadelphia Phillies, playing in one game against the Chicago Cubs on July 9. He replaced Fred Luderus at first base—with Gene Packard in between as a pinch hitter—and notched his first major league hit in his debut at-bat. On July 31, Pasquella was playing for the St. Louis Cardinals against the Phillies, where Packard earned the victory for Philadelphia. Pasquella pinch-hit for pitcher Bill Sherdell, going hitless in his only Cardinals at-bat.

After playing, Pasquella worked as a minor league manager for three teams. He skippered the Crisfield Crabbers of the Eastern Shore League (ESL) in the 1926 and 1927 seasons, followed by the ESL's Easton Farmers in 1928, and the Greenville Tobacconists of the Eastern Carolina League in 1929; he returned to the Crabbers in 1937 for his final managerial job.

Pasquella died on April 5, 1965, in Bridgeport, Connecticut, and was buried in St. Michael Cemetery in the neighboring town of Stratford.

== See also ==
- Philadelphia Phillies all-time roster (P–Q)
