= Rudy Arroyo =

American baseball player (born 1950)

- Pitcher
- Born: June 19, 1950 (age 76); New York, New York, U.S.
- Died: April 27th, 2026 (Florida)
- Batted: Left Threw: Left

MLB debut
- June 1, 1971, for the St. Louis Cardinals

Last MLB appearance
- June 24, 1971, for the St. Louis Cardinals

MLB statistics
- Win–loss record: 0–1
- Earned run average: 5.40
- Strikeouts: 5
- Stats at Baseball Reference

Teams
- St. Louis Cardinals (1971)

Rudolph Arroyo (born June 19, 1950) is an American former Major League Baseball pitcher who played for one season. He pitched for the St. Louis Cardinals in nine games during the 1971 St. Louis Cardinals season.
