= Ron Stone (baseball) =

American baseball player (born 1942)

- Outfielder
- Born: September 9, 1942 (age 83); Corning, California, U.S.
- Batted: Left Threw: Left

MLB debut
- April 13, 1966, for the Kansas City Athletics

Last MLB appearance
- October 2, 1972, for the Philadelphia Phillies

MLB statistics
- Batting average: .241
- Home runs: 6
- Runs batted in: 89
- Stats at Baseball Reference

Teams
- Kansas City Athletics (1966); Philadelphia Phillies (1969–1972)

Harry Ronald Stone (born September 9, 1942) is an American former professional baseball outfielder. He played all or part of five seasons in Major League Baseball (MLB) between 1966 and 1972 for the Kansas City Athletics and Philadelphia Phillies. He threw and batted left-handed, stood 6 feet 2 inches (1.88 m) tall and weighed 185 pounds (84 kg).

== Career ==
A native of Corning, California, Stone attended San Joaquin Delta College and California State University, Sacramento. He played 11 seasons (1963–73) in pro baseball after signing with the Baltimore Orioles. Selected by the Athletics in the 1965 Rule 5 draft, Stone spent the first three months of 1966 on the Athletics' roster, appearing in 26 games (only seven of them in the field), and collecting six hits in 22 at-bats. Then he was returned to the Baltimore organization, where he toiled for 21/2 more seasons in the minor leagues. The Orioles traded him to the Phillies for Clay Dalrymple on January 21, 1969.

In Philadelphia, he spent three full seasons (1969–71) on the major league roster as the team's fourth outfielder. In 1970, Stone reached career bests in games played (123), hits (84), doubles (12), triples (five), home runs (three), runs batted in (39) and batting average (.262). He started 76 games.

All told, Stone appeared in 388 games, and collected 194 hits, with 28 doubles, eight triples and six home runs. He drove in 89 runs and batted .241 lifetime.
