= Joe Lis =

American baseball player (1946–2010)

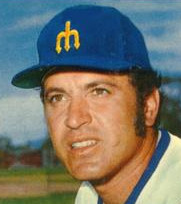
- First baseman
- Born: August 15, 1946; Somerville, New Jersey, U.S.
- Died: October 17, 2010 (aged 64); Evansville, Indiana, U.S.
- Batted: Right Threw: Right

Professional debut
- MLB: September 5, 1970, for the Philadelphia Phillies
- NPB: April 1, 1978, for the Kintetsu Buffaloes

Last appearance
- MLB: May 8, 1977, for the Seattle Mariners
- NPB: September 17, 1978, for the Kintetsu Buffaloes

MLB statistics
- Batting average: .233
- Home runs: 32
- Runs batted in: 92

NPB statistics
- Batting average: .206
- Home runs: 6
- Runs batted in: 30
- Stats at Baseball Reference

Teams
- Philadelphia Phillies (1970–1972); Minnesota Twins (1973–1974); Cleveland Indians (1974–1976); Seattle Mariners (1977); Kintetsu Buffaloes (1978)

Joseph Anthony Lis (August 15, 1946 – October 17, 2010), was an American professional baseball first baseman, who played in Major League Baseball (MLB) for the Philadelphia Phillies (1970–1972), Minnesota Twins (1973–1974), Cleveland Indians (1974–1976), and Seattle Mariners (1977). He also played one season for the Kintetsu Buffaloes of Nippon Professional Baseball (NPB), in 1978. During his playing days, Lis stood 6 feet (1.83 m) tall, weighing 175 pounds (79 kg); he batted and threw right-handed.

Born in Somerville, New Jersey and raised in nearby Manville, he moved with his family to Hillsborough Township as a pre-teen and attended Somerville High School, where he played both basketball and baseball.

Signed as an undrafted free agent in 1964 by the Philadelphia Phillies out of high school, when he was 17.

Lis entered the majors in 1970 with the Philadelphia Phillies, playing for them three years before joining the Minnesota Twins (1973–1974), Cleveland Indians (1974–1976), and Seattle Mariners (1977). He had been traded along with Ken Sanders and Ken Reynolds by the Phillies to the Twins for César Tovar on December 1, 1972. While relegated to playing mainly first base as a big leaguer, he also played left field, right field, third base, and even caught in one game.

A good power hitter in Minor League Baseball (MiLB), Lis swatted at least 33 home runs in three separate MiLB seasons. He batted .306 with 30 homers and an International League-leading 103 runs batted in (RBI) with the Toledo Mud Hens and shared Most Valuable Player (MVP) honors with Rich Dauer and Mickey Klutts in 1976. Nevertheless, Lis never translated his minor league success into a full-time job in the major leagues. His most productive MLB season was 1973, with Minnesota, when he posted career-high numbers in homers (nine), runs batted in (RBI) (25), and games played (103), as a replacement for injured Harmon Killebrew.

Lis also played in Nippon Professional Baseball, for the Kintetsu Buffaloes, in 1978. He finished his baseball career with the Triple-A Champion, Evansville Triplets, in the 1979 season.

Following his playing career, Lis coached youth baseball for over 30 years, including in the Newburgh American Legion from 1984 to 2002. In 2003, he became General Manager of the Evansville Wolfepack 18-year-old travel team. Lis also owned and operated the Joe Lis Baseball School since 1991, and worked at James R. Pyle Insurance Agency since 1989.

Lis died from prostate cancer in Evansville, Indiana, at the age of 64, on October 17, 2010.
