= Tom Kelley (baseball) =

American baseball player (1944–2015)

- Pitcher
- Born: January 5, 1944; Manchester, Connecticut, U.S.
- Died: September 25, 2015 (aged 71); Myrtle Beach, South Carolina, U.S.
- Batted: Right Threw: Right

MLB debut
- May 5, 1964, for the Cleveland Indians

Last MLB appearance
- May 20, 1973, for the Atlanta Braves

MLB statistics
- Win–loss record: 20–22
- Earned run average: 3.75
- Strikeouts: 234
- Stats at Baseball Reference

Teams
- Cleveland Indians (1964–1967); Atlanta Braves (1971–1973)

Thomas Henry Kelley (January 5, 1944 – September 25, 2015) was an American pitcher in Major League Baseball who played for the Cleveland Indians and the Atlanta Braves in parts of seven seasons spanning 1964–1973. Listed at 6' 0" [1.80 m], 185 lb. [84 kg], Kelley batted and threw right-handed. He was born in Manchester, Connecticut.

== Playing career ==
Kelley was signed by the Cleveland Indians as an amateur free agent in 1963. He posted a 9–9 record and a 3.17 earned run average with Double-A Charleston Indians the following year, earning a late-season callup to the majors, where he made six relief appearances.

In 1965, Kelley compiled an outstanding 16–3 record with a 2.38 ERA in 26 starts for the Triple-A Portland Beavers of the Triple-A Pacific Coast League, including a no-hitter against the Spokane Indians on May 29. He then returned to the parent Indians and went 2–1 with a 2.40 ERA in four late-season starts appearances.

Kelley spent the entire 1966 season with Cleveland, but could only manage a 4–8 record with a 4.34 ERA in 31 games, including seven starts. After that, he underwent shoulder surgery and languished in the Minor Leagues during three years before reviving his career with the Atlanta Braves in 1971. In that season, Kelley made 28 pitching appearances for the Braves, including 20 starts, posting a 9–5 record with a solid 2.96 ERA and five complete games, as part of pitching rotation that included Phil Niekro, Ron Reed, George Stone and Pat Jarvis, witnessing legendary teammate Hank Aaron while hitting his 600th career home run in late April. He then spent four years in Triple-A with the Braves and New York Mets organizations before retiring in 1976.

In a seven-year career, Kelley went 20–22 with a 3.75 ERA in 104 pitching appearances, including 45 starts, 16 complete games and one shutout, striking out 234 batters while walking 207 in 408 innings of work. He also went 20–22 with a 3.75 ERA in 104 minor league games.

== Post-baseball career ==
Following his baseball career, Kelley worked for United Parcel Service for 15 years, retiring as a center manager. In 1987, he gained induction into the Manchester Sports Hall of Fame.

== Personal life and death ==
Kelley was a long time resident of Myrtle Beach, South Carolina, where he died in 2015 at the age of 71.
