= Danny Frisella =

American baseball player (1946–1977)

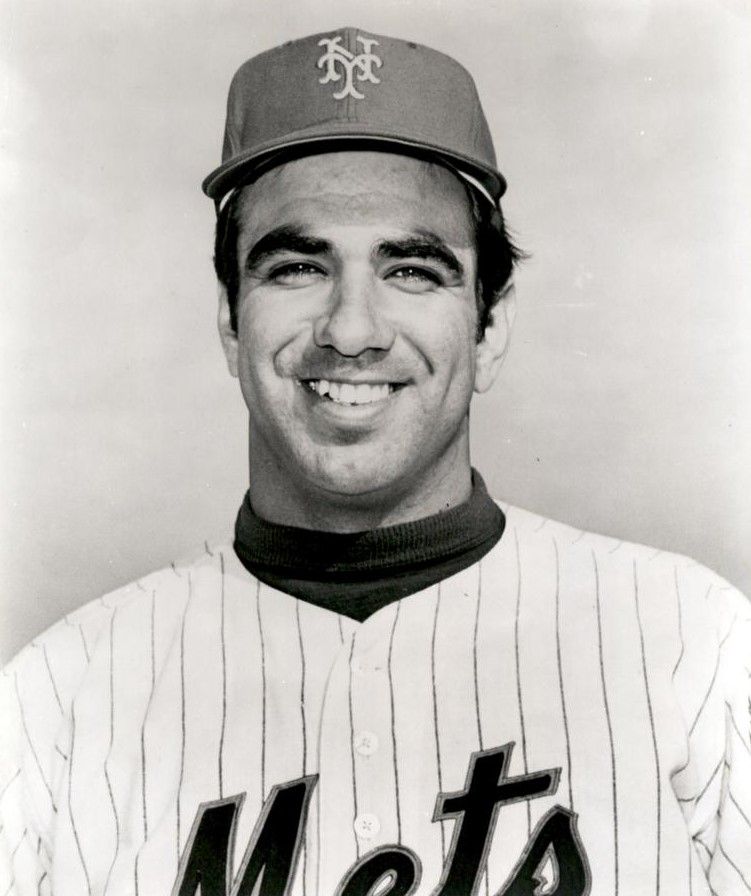
- Pitcher
- Born: March 4, 1946; San Francisco, California, U.S.
- Died: January 1, 1977 (aged 30); Phoenix, Arizona, U.S.
- Batted: Left Threw: Right

MLB debut
- July 27, 1967, for the New York Mets

Last MLB appearance
- September 23, 1976, for the Milwaukee Brewers

MLB statistics
- Win–loss record: 34–40
- Earned run average: 3.32
- Strikeouts: 471
- Saves: 57
- Stats at Baseball Reference

Teams
- New York Mets (1967–1972); Atlanta Braves (1973–1974); San Diego Padres (1975); St. Louis Cardinals (1976); Milwaukee Brewers (1976)

Daniel Vincent Frisella (March 4, 1946 – January 1, 1977) was an American Major League Baseball pitcher whose career was cut short when he was killed in a dune buggy accident on New Year's Day in 1977.

== Early life ==
Daniel Vincent "Danny" Frisella was born on March 4, 1946, in San Francisco, California. Frisella's father was an Italian-American firefighter. His mother was an Irish-American house wife. Frisella attended Junípero Serra High School in San Mateo, California, where he excelled in baseball. He graduated in 1963 and was inducted into the school's Athletic Hall of Fame in 1992. Serra High School's baseball field, Frisella Field, was dedicated to him in 1979.

== College career ==
Frisella spent one year at the College of San Mateo before transferring to Washington State University in Pullman. After leading the Cougars to the College World Series in 1965 and being named to the All-Conference team, he was selected by the Milwaukee Braves in the 39th round of the 1965 Major League Baseball draft, but did not sign. In 1966, he was again named All-Conference, and led WSU to the District VIII Regional finals.

== Professional career ==
=== Draft and minor leagues ===
Frisella was drafted by the New York Mets in the third round of the June 1966 Secondary draft, and signed. Frisella went 5-4 with a 2.96 earned run average mostly as a starting pitcher with the Auburn Mets of the New York–Penn League in 1966. He began the 1967 season in the Carolina League with the Durham Bulls, where he went 9-3 with a 1.49 ERA in thirteen starts to earn a promotion all the way up to triple A. He began seeing more work as a relief pitcher with the Jacksonville Suns, and was added to the major league bullpen by the end of July.

After three relief appearances (8 innings pitched, no earned runs) for manager Wes Westrum, Frisella was added to the Mets' starting rotation. He was 1-6 in his eleven starts with a 3.82 ERA. His one win came against the Pittsburgh Pirates on August 11. In a no-decision against the San Francisco Giants. Frisella allowed just two hits over nine innings while striking out seven.

Frisella spent the next two seasons shuffling from the minor leagues to the majors, compiling a 2-4 record and 4.28 ERA in 22 games at the major league level, and a 15-4 record and 2.65 ERA in the minors.

=== New York Mets (1967–1972) ===
Following the 1969 season, Frisella played winter ball in Venezuela. Venezuelan Baseball Hall of Famer Diego Segui, who was a forkball specialist, taught Frisella the pitch. It turned out to be Frisella's out pitch for the rest of his career, as it had such impressive movement on it that he was often accused of throwing a spitter.

After starting the 1970 season in Triple A, Frisella joined the Mets at the beginning of July. He earned his first career save in his first appearance of the season, and his record stood at 4-0 with a 1.88 ERA at the end of the month. He ended the season with an 8-3 record, 3.02 ERA and 54 strikeouts in 65.2 innings pitched. Opposing batters batted just .204 against him. Despite missing half the season, his 29 relief appearances were the third most on the team.

In 1971, Frisella and Tug McGraw formed a devastating righty/lefty tandem closing out Mets games. Following three innings of scoreless ball pitched on the 4th of July, Frisella saw his ERA hit a season low of 1.37. He ended the season at 8-5 with a 1.99 ERA and a team leading twelve saves. After going 5–8 with a 3.34 ERA and nine saves, Frisella was traded along with Gary Gentry from the Mets to the Atlanta Braves for Félix Millán and George Stone on November 1, 1972.

=== Atlanta Braves (1973–1974) ===
Frisella developed arm trouble during spring training 1973, and dealt with nagging health issues throughout the season. While he led the team with eight saves, Frisella had nine blown saves. The second of these came against his former club in his first game back at Shea Stadium. Entering the game in the eighth inning with the Braves leading 2-1, Frisella allowed both inherited base runners to score, and gave up an additional four earned runs of his own, while retiring just two batters.

His role diminished substantially in 1974. After logging five saves through June, poor performance and injury limited him to just one over the remainder of the season. His last game as a Brave was also his only start for the team. Against the Mets at Shea, he went four innings, and gave up four earned runs in a no-decision. At the winter meetings after the season, the Braves sent Frisella to the San Diego Padres to reacquire Cito Gaston.

=== San Diego Padres (1975) ===
Frisella enjoyed something of a resurgence in San Diego. Despite a 1-6 record, he pitched a career high 97.2 innings in a career high 65 appearances to go along with a 3.13 ERA. He and Bill Greif, both right handers, shared closing duties, with each recording nine saves. During spring training in 1976, Frisella was dealt to the St. Louis Cardinals for lefty pitcher Ken Reynolds and minor leaguer Bob Stewart.

=== Cardinals & Brewers (1976) ===
With Al Hrabosky already in their bullpen, the Cards had no need for a closer. Thus, Frisella became more of a right handed specialist for the Cardinals. He did well in that role, holding opposing batters to a .190 batting average, and compiling a 1.45 ERA. Two poor performances against Cincinnati's "Big Red Machine" saw his ERA balloon to 3.97 before he was sent to the Milwaukee Brewers for a player to be named later midway through the season.

In his half season with the Brewers, he became manager Alex Grammas' favorite right hander out of the bullpen. He pitched 3.1 innings of one-hit ball against the California Angels to earn his first save with his new team, on his way to a team leading nine. He went 5-2 with a 2.74 ERA while holding batters to a .175 batting average.

== MLB career statistics ==
W	L	Pct	ERA	G	GS	GF	S	IP	H	ER	R	HR	BB	K	WP	HBP	BAA	Fld%	Avg.
34	40	.459	3.32	351	17	215	57	609.1	529	225	256	53	286	471	38	7	.235	.955	.179

== Personal life ==
Frisella died on January 1, 1977, the result of a dune buggy accident. His friend, who was driving the dune buggy, escaped with only minor injuries. The accident occurred about 50 yards (46 m) from Frisella's home when his friend lost control of the dune buggy, causing it to overturn. Frisella tried to jump from the vehicle as it began to flip, but he was unable to free his leg from the dune buggy and his head was struck by the roll bar.

Frisella was survived by his wife, Pamela, and two sons. Pamela was pregnant with the couple's second son at the time of Frisella's death; he was born on March 4, on what would have been Frisella's 31st birthday.

Frisella served with the Air National Guard during his minor league career.

Danny Frisella Memorial Stadium, the baseball stadium at Frisella's high school (Junípero Serra High School in San Mateo, California), is named after him.

== See also ==
- List of baseball players who died during their careers
