= Terry Harmon =

American baseball player

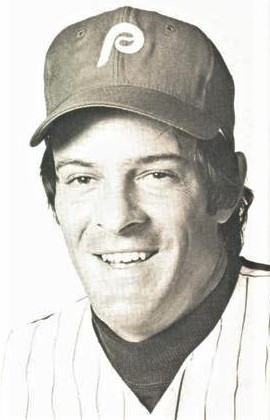
- Second baseman / Shortstop
- Born: April 12, 1944 (age 82); Toledo, Ohio, U.S.
- Batted: Right Threw: Right

MLB debut
- July 23, 1967, for the Philadelphia Phillies

Last MLB appearance
- October 2, 1977, for the Philadelphia Phillies

MLB statistics
- Batting average: .233
- Home runs: 4
- Runs batted in: 72
- Stats at Baseball Reference

Teams
- Philadelphia Phillies (1967, 1969–1977)

Terry Walter Harmon (born April 12, 1944) is an American former professional baseball second baseman/shortstop who played Major League Baseball (MLB) for the Philadelphia Phillies (1967, 1969–77). He was a 5th round pick (85th player chosen overall) of the Phillies in the 1965 MLB draft.

Harmon attended DeVilbiss High School and Ohio University.

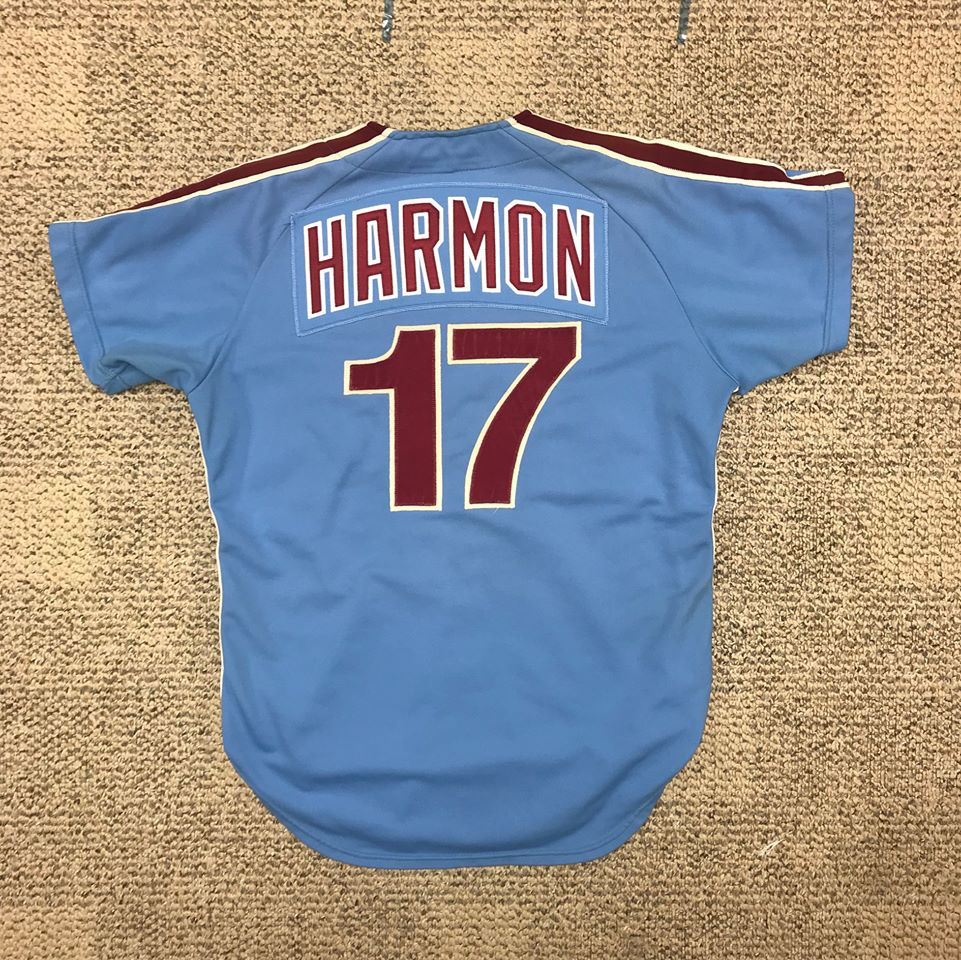
1977 Philadelphia Phillies #17 Terry Harmon game worn road jersey

Harmon helped the Phillies win two consecutive National League (NL) Eastern Division titles, in 1976 and 1977.

Over ten MLB seasons, Harmon played in 547 games, had 1,125 at-bats, 164 runs scored, 262 hits, 31 doubles, 12 triples, 4 home runs, 72 RBIs, 17 stolen bases, and 117 walks, with a .233 batting average, .311 on-base percentage, and .292 slugging percentage.`

== See also ==
- List of Major League Baseball players who spent their entire career with one franchise
