= Chris Zachary =

American baseball player (1944–2003)

- Pitcher
- Born: February 19, 1944; Knoxville, Tennessee, U.S.
- Died: April 19, 2003 (aged 59); Knoxville, Tennessee, U.S.
- Batted: Left Threw: Right

MLB debut
- April 11, 1963, for the Houston Colt .45s

Last MLB appearance
- September 23, 1973, for the Pittsburgh Pirates

MLB statistics
- Win–loss record: 10–29
- Earned run average: 4.57
- Strikeouts: 184
- Stats at Baseball Reference

Teams
- Houston Colt .45s / Astros (1963–1967); Kansas City Royals (1969); St. Louis Cardinals (1971); Detroit Tigers (1972); Pittsburgh Pirates (1973)

William Christopher Zachary (February 19, 1944 – April 19, 2003) was an American professional baseball pitcher, a right-hander who appeared in 108 games, 40 as a starter, over a nine-year career in Major League Baseball for the Houston Colt .45s / Astros (1963–1967), Kansas City Royals (1969), St. Louis Cardinals (1971), Detroit Tigers (1972) and Pittsburgh Pirates (1973). Born in Knoxville, Tennessee, Zachary batted left-handed and was listed as 6 feet 2 inches (1.88 m) tall and 200 pounds (91 kg).

== Baseball career ==
=== With Houston ===
After starring at Knoxville's Central High School, Zachary signed with Houston prior to the 1963 season and spent his first professional season on the Colt .45s' National League roster. He made his MLB debut in the club's third game of the regular season, working one inning of a 7–1 defeat at the hands of the San Francisco Giants at Colt Stadium. The first three hitters he faced were future members of the Baseball Hall of Fame: Zachary issued a base on balls to Willie Mays, then allowed a single to Willie McCovey and a three-run home run to Orlando Cepeda. For his rookie campaign, Zachary worked in 22 games, with seven starts, and notched a 2–2 won–lost record and 4.89 earned run average in 57 innings pitched. However, 1963 would prove to be Zachary's only full year in the majors. In 1964, he won 16 games, losing only six, for the Double-A San Antonio Bullets and was chosen the Texas League pitcher of the year before working in one game for the Colt .45s at the end of the season. From 1965 through 1967, Zachary appeared in only 23 total games pitched for the renamed Astros, spending the balance of each season in Triple-A.

=== Remainder of MLB career ===
After working in eight games for the 1968 Oklahoma City 89ers, Zachary was acquired by the Royals, an expansion team set to begin play in 1969. Zachary then made abbreviated appearances for Kansas City (eight games), St. Louis (23 games), Detroit (25 games) and Pittsburgh (six games) through 1973.

As a Cardinal in 1971, he threw his only MLB complete game and shutout on May 27 at Busch Memorial Stadium, allowing only two hits to the Chicago Cubs and striking out three, with no walks. His 1972 season was also notable. Called up by the Tigers from Triple-A Toledo in May, Zachary became a reliable member of manager Billy Martin's bullpen, compiling a sparkling 1.41 ERA with one win and one save in 381/3 innings pitched as Detroit captured the AL East title. Zachary then made his only postseason appearance in Game 2 of the 1972 American League Championship Series against the Athletics at the Oakland Coliseum. Entering the game in the fifth inning in relief of Woody Fryman with Detroit trailing 1–0, Zachary had severe control issues. He threw two wild pitches, allowing an insurance run to score from third base, and walked Joe Rudi. He left the game without recording an out, and was charged with one earned run in Oakland's 5–0 victory.

Zachary's final MLB line included a 10–29 won–lost mark (for a winning percentage of .256), with an earned run average of 4.57 and two career saves. In 3211/3 innings pitched, he allowed 344 hits and 122 bases on balls, with 184 strikeouts. He compiled a stellar minor-league record, however, winning 84 games against only 55 defeats, and recording six seasons of double-digit victories. He retired after the 1974 season, and died in Knoxville at age 59 from bone-marrow cancer.
