= Frank Linzy =

American baseball player (born 1940)

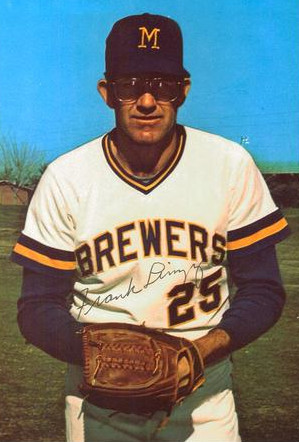
- Linzy in 1973
- Pitcher
- Born: September 15, 1940 (age 85); Fort Gibson, Oklahoma, U.S.
- Batted: Right Threw: Right

MLB debut
- August 14, 1963, for the San Francisco Giants

Last MLB appearance
- September 2, 1974, for the Philadelphia Phillies

MLB statistics
- Win–loss record: 62–57
- Earned run average: 2.85
- Strikeouts: 358
- Saves: 110
- Stats at Baseball Reference

Teams
- San Francisco Giants (1963, 1965–1970); St. Louis Cardinals (1970–1971); Milwaukee Brewers (1972–1973); Philadelphia Phillies (1974)

Frank Alfred Linzy (born September 15, 1940) is an American former professional baseball player, used almost exclusively as a relief pitcher. Over the course of his Major League Baseball (MLB) career, Linzy played for the San Francisco Giants (1963; 1965–1970), St. Louis Cardinals (1970–1971), Milwaukee Brewers (1972–1973), and Philadelphia Phillies (1974). He batted and threw right-handed.

== Major league career ==
In Linzy's first full MLB season (1965), he finished 13th in voting for the NL Most Valuable Player (won by his teammate, Willie Mays) and 3rd in voting for Rookie of the Year (won by Dodger Jim Lefebvre). That year, the hard-throwing righty had arguably his best season, in which he tallied a 9–3 win–loss (W-L) record, 57 games (G), 40 games finished (GF), 21 saves (SV), 81 2/3 innings pitched (IP), allowing 76 hits (H), 19 runs (R), 13 earned runs (ER), 2 home Runs (HR), 23 walks (BB), notching 35 strikeouts (SO), hitting 3 batsmen (HBP), making 5 wild pitches (WP), facing 334 batters (BFP), yielding 8 intentional walks (IBB), and posting a 1.43 earned run average (ERA).

Linzy had only two games started (GS), over 11 MLB seasons. But he was not a "closer," in the modern sense of the word; Linzy was more of a 1960s "fireman," in that the Giants called upon him at any time — not just in the 9th inning — but in the 7th, the 8th, or whenever the opposition was threatening to score late in a tight game. In 1965 and 1966, Linzy was especially effective over the closing weeks in those two heated pennant races.

Linzy's big league totals include a record of 62–57 W-L, 516 G, 2 GS, 342 GF, 110 SV, 817 1/3 IP, 790 H, 315 R, 259 ER, 35 HR, 282 BB, 358 SO, 14 HBP, 30 WP, 3,454 BFP, 97 IBB, 1 balk (BK), and a 2.85 ERA.
