= Al Santorini =

American baseball player (born 1948)

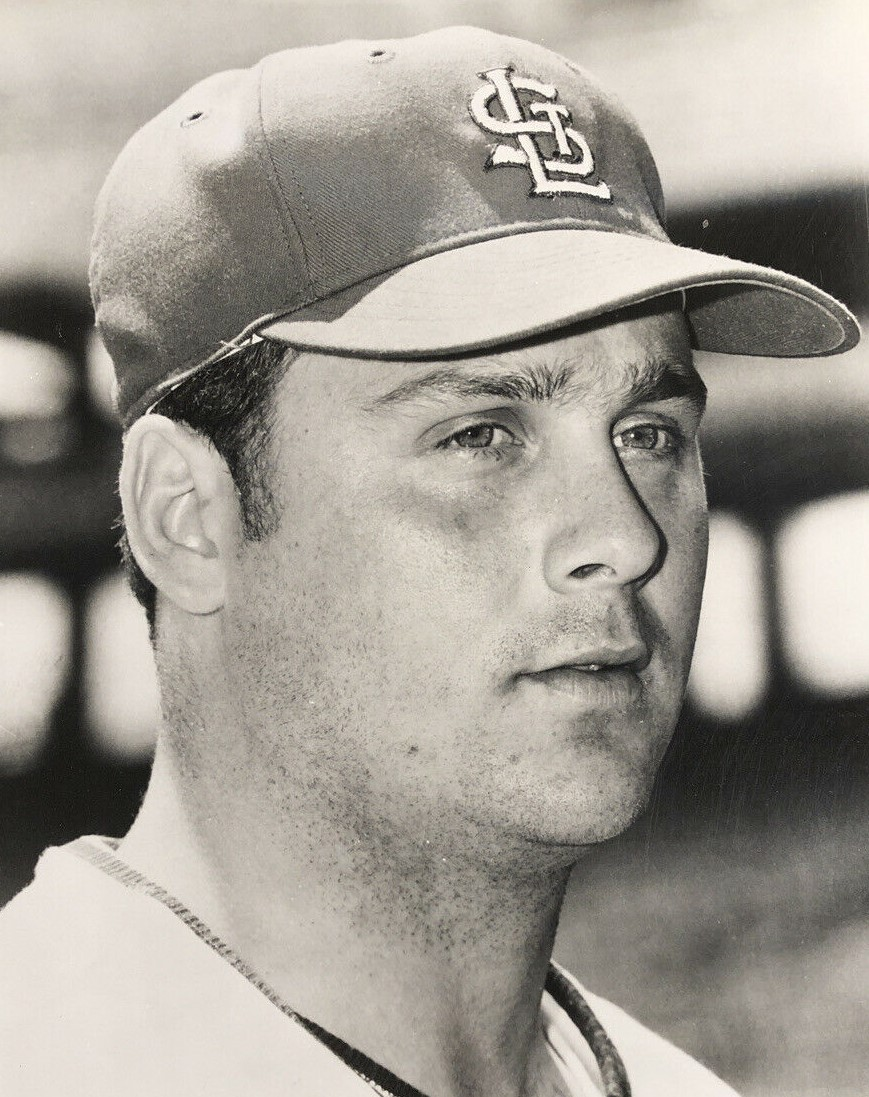
- Pitcher
- Born: May 19, 1948 (age 78); Irvington, New Jersey, U.S.
- Batted: Right Threw: Right

MLB debut
- September 10, 1968, for the Atlanta Braves

Last MLB appearance
- May 5, 1973, for the St. Louis Cardinals

MLB statistics
- Win–loss record: 17–38
- Earned run average: 4.29
- Strikeouts: 268
- Stats at Baseball Reference

Teams
- Atlanta Braves (1968); San Diego Padres (1969–1971); St. Louis Cardinals (1971–1973)

Alan Joel Santorini (born May 19, 1948) is an American former Major League Baseball pitcher. He played all or parts of six seasons in the majors, from 1968 until 1973, for the Atlanta Braves, San Diego Padres and St. Louis Cardinals. In 1969, he led Padre pitchers (along with Joe Niekro) in wins, winning eight games that season.
