= Manny Muñiz =

Puerto Rican baseball player (born 1947)

- Pitcher
- Born: December 31, 1947 (age 78); Caguas, Puerto Rico
- Batted: Right Threw: Right

MLB debut
- August 1, 1971, for the Philadelphia Phillies

Last MLB appearance
- September 17, 1971, for the Philadelphia Phillies

MLB statistics
- Win–loss record: 0–1
- Earned run average: 6.97
- Strikeouts: 6
- Stats at Baseball Reference

Teams
- Philadelphia Phillies (1971)

Manuel Muñiz Rodriguez (born December 31, 1947) is a Puerto Rican former professional baseball pitcher, who played in Major League Baseball (MLB) for the Philadelphia Phillies in part of the 1971 season.
