= Bobby Pfeil =

American baseball player (born 1943)

- Third baseman
- Born: November 13, 1943 (age 82); Passaic, New Jersey, U.S.
- Batted: Right Threw: Right

MLB debut
- June 26, 1969, for the New York Mets

Last MLB appearance
- September 6, 1971, for the Philadelphia Phillies

MLB statistics
- Batting average: .242
- Home runs: 2
- Runs batted in: 19
- Stats at Baseball Reference

Teams
- New York Mets (1969); Philadelphia Phillies (1971)

Robert Raymond Pfeil (born November 13, 1943) is an American former professional baseball third baseman, who played in Major League Baseball (MLB) in 1969 and 1971 for the New York Mets and Philadelphia Phillies, respectively. He threw and batted right-handed.

Pfeil attended Reseda High School, making the varsity team his junior year.

Originally signed as an undrafted free agent by the Chicago Cubs in 1961, Pfeil was traded with Hal Gilson to the St. Louis Cardinals for Bob Humphreys on April 7, 1965. Before the start of the 1968 season, Pfeil was sent from the Cardinals to the New York Mets, in an unknown transaction.

Pfeil made his big league debut at the age of 25 on June 26, 1969, against Philadelphia Phillies pitcher Grant Jackson. Pfeil went 1-for-4 in his debut, although Jackson shut the Mets out 2-0 and held them to just four hits, while striking out ten. Pfeil did well during the first two weeks of his rookie campaign; he was hitting .333 on July 4, but by July 31, his batting average had fallen to .232. (Coincidentally, .232 turned out to be his 1969 season's final batting average.) After July 31, Pfeil was able to pull his average above .240 only once, with a low point of .217. However, after going 3-for-6 in the final two games of the season, Pfeil brought his average up to its final mark of .232. In 211 at-bats, he also scored 20 runs, drove 10 runs in, doubled nine times, walked seven times, and struck out 27 times.

Although the Mets reached the playoffs and eventually won the World Series in 1969, Pfeil did not appear in the playoffs or the fall classic. However, when President Nixon attended a World Series game, Pfeil lent him his glove for protection.

On May 26, 1970, Pfeil was sent as the player to be named later to the Phillies to complete a trade that had occurred originally April 10, 1970. In return for Pfeil, the Mets received Ron Allen.

Pfeil did not appear in the major leagues in 1970. In 1971 he was back in a big league uniform. Pfeil appeared in 44 games for the Phillies that year, collecting 19 hits in 70 at-bats for a .271 batting average. As he had made his major league debut against the Phillies while playing for the Mets, it was ironic that Pfeil ended up facing the Mets while playing for the Phillies in his final career at-bat on September 5, 1971. Pfeil then played his final game, appearing as a defensive replacement against the Cardinals on September 6, 1971.

In Pfeil's big league career he played in 106 games, collecting 68 hits in 281 at-bats for a .242 batting average. Pfeil had 12 doubles and two home runs to go along with 25 runs, 19 runs batted in, one stolen base, 13 walks and 36 strikeouts. He had a .976 career fielding percentage.

Although Pfeil did not play in the majors after 1971, he remained an active minor league player. On February 8, 1972, Pfeil was traded to the Milwaukee Brewers for a player to be named later, who ended up being minor leaguer Chico Vaughns. On March 20 of that year, Pfeil was purchased by the Boston Red Sox from the Brewers.
