= Ken Reynolds =

American baseball player (born 1947)

- Pitcher
- Born: January 4, 1947 (age 79); Trevose, Pennsylvania, U.S.
- Batted: Left Threw: Left

MLB debut
- September 5, 1970, for the Philadelphia Phillies

Last MLB appearance
- July 30, 1976, for the San Diego Padres

MLB statistics
- Win–loss record: 7–29
- Earned run average: 4.46
- Strikeouts: 197
- Stats at Baseball Reference

Teams
- Philadelphia Phillies (1970–1972); Milwaukee Brewers (1973); St. Louis Cardinals (1975); San Diego Padres (1976)

Kenneth Lee Reynolds (born January 4, 1947) is an American former professional baseball player who had a six-year career in Major League Baseball between 1970 and 1976. The left-handed pitcher appeared in 103 games for the Philadelphia Phillies, St. Louis Cardinals and San Diego Padres of the National League, and the Milwaukee Brewers, then members of the American League. He began his career as a starting pitcher and ended as a reliever. His MLB appearances were almost evenly split between starting (51) and bullpen assignments (52).

== Biography ==
Born in Trevose, Pennsylvania, on January 4, 1947, Reynolds graduated from Marlborough High School (Massachusetts), and attended New Mexico Highlands University. He was selected by the Phillies in the fourth round of the 1966 Major League Baseball draft and was listed as 6 feet (1.8 m) tall and 180 pounds (82 kg).

Reynolds had a good minor-league career, posting a 117–89 won–lost record and a 3.65 career earned run average in 282 games over 12 seasons. In the major leagues, he lost 29 of his 36 career decisions (yielding a poor .269 winning percentage), although he played largely for losing teams. In 1972, he lost 15 games and won only two while a member of the last-place Phillies, who lost 97 of their 156 games played during that strike-shortened season. He lost 12 straight decisions from the start of 1972, tying a National League record. He was traded along with Ken Sanders and Joe Lis to the Minnesota Twins for César Tovar on December 1, 1972. That campaign was Reynolds' last full year in the majors. He was traded by the Twins to the Milwaukee Brewers for Mike Ferraro on March 28, 1973. He split the 1973, 1975 and 1976 seasons between the big leagues and the minors. In 375 2/3 total MLB innings pitched, he surrendered 370 hits and 196 bases on balls, with 197 strikeouts. His total pro career lasted for 14 years (1966–1979).

After retiring from the mound, Reynolds was a minor league pitching coach in the Toronto Blue Jays' and Chicago Cubs' organizations. He then returned to his alma mater, coaching baseball and teaching physical education and project adventure at Marlborough High School. He is now retired.
