= 1970 Houston Astros season =

Ninth season in Major League Baseball for the Houston Astros

1970 Houston Astros
- League: National League
- Division: West
- Ballpark: Astrodome
- City: Houston, Texas
- Record: 79–83 (.488)
- Divisional place: 4th
- Owners: Roy Hofheinz
- General managers: Spec Richardson
- Managers: Harry Walker
- Television: KTRK-TV
- Radio: KPRC (AM) (Gene Elston, Loel Passe, Harry Kalas)

The 1970 Houston Astros season was the ninth season for the Major League Baseball (MLB) franchise located in Houston, Texas, their sixth as the Astros, their ninth in the National League (NL), second in the NL West division, and sixth at The Astrodome. The Astros entered the season having posted a record of 81–81, for fifth place and 12 games behind the division-champion Atlanta Braves.

On April 7, pitcher Larry Dierker made his second Opening Day start for the Astros, who defeated the San Francisco Giants at Candlestick Park, 8–5. The Astros' first-round draft pick in the amateur draft was pitcher Randy Scarbery, at third overall, and in the fourth round, they selected outfielder Greg Gross.

The Astros produced the only game in franchise history with at least both 20 hits and drawing 10 bases on balls on July 11. (Note: As of 2025.) Second baseman Joe Morgan and shortstop Denis Menke represented the Astros at the MLB All-Star Game, the second career selection for both.

The Astros concluded the season with a record of 79–83, for fourth place and 23 games behind the division-champion and NL pennant-winning Cincinnati Reds in the NL West. Third baseman Doug Rader became the second Astros player to be awarded Gold Gloves, his first of five consecutive.

== Offseason ==
=== Summary ===
The Astros concluded the 1969 season with an 81–81 (.500) record, for fifth place and 12 games behind the NL West division-champion Atlanta Braves, the first year of the divisional era. With Major League Baseball's third wave of expansion, the number of teams in each of the National and American Leagues grew from 10 to 12, splitting them into East and West divisions, while inserting the League Championship Series into the playoff tournament. The National League added the Montreal Expos and San Diego Padres, with the Padres, Braves, and Astros all aligned together into the NL West division. Meanwhile, the American League added the Kansas City Royals and Seattle Pilots. The 1969 season was the first in franchise history in which Houston attained a record of at least .500 and a then-record 81 wins, reversing a trend of at least 90 losses during each of their first seven seasons of play. On May 1, 1969, Don Wilson became the first Astros hurler to toss two no-hitters for the team, while Larry Dierker became an All-Star and Houston's first-ever 20-game winner.

=== Transactions ===
- November 21, 1969: Mike Marshall was purchased by the Astros from the Milwaukee Brewers.
- December 4, 1969: Curt Blefary was traded by the Astros to the New York Yankees for Joe Pepitone.

=== Exhibition play ===
On April 3, Doug Rader swatted the first home run to reach the Astrodome's gold (upper reserved) seats, landing in section 738D, row 6, seat 1. Rader "touched 'em all" on Stan Bahnsen's offering during the Astros' 9–5 victory over the New York Yankees.

== Regular season ==
=== Summary ===
==== April ====
Opening Day starting lineup
Uniform	Player	Position
18	Joe Morgan	Second baseman
9	Joe Pepitone	Right fielder
24	Jimmy Wynn	Center fielder
33	John Mayberry	First baseman
11	Denis Menke	Shortstop
10	Tommy Davis	Left fielder
12	Doug Rader	Third baseman
7	Johnny Edwards	Catcher
49	Larry Dierker	Pitcher
Venue: Candlestick Park • Houston 8, San Francisco 5 Sources:

Astros Opening Day starter, Larry Dierker, "ordered" pinch hitter Norm Miller to hit a home run as he was departing the game on April 7. Miller obliged, with a pivotal three-run blast off starter Gaylord Perry of the San Francisco Giants at Candlestick Park in an 8–5 Astros victory. Dierker picked up the win, while Fred Gladding iced the final 1 2/3 frames to earn the save. Dierker, the Astros' starter for the opener in 1968, became the first pitcher to start more than one for the club.

The Astros launched five home runs on April 12 to dump Phil Niekro and the Atlanta Braves, 8–3. In the third inning, Jimmy Wynn blasted one unforgettable rocket which made contact in the gold upper reserved seats (section 738C, row 6, seat 3), outdoing his own effort just earlier in the game. In the first inning, Wynn had launched a home run into the purple seats. Tommy Davis, Joe Pepitone and Doug Rader each went yard, helping starter Larry Dierker remain in complete command the whole evening.

On April 23, Tom Griffin tossed his first one-hit complete game, where he issued two walks and struck out eight.

==== June ====
Center fielder César Cedeño made his major league debut on June 20 at Atlanta Stadium, and proceeded to accrete two hits as Houston rallied to defeat the Braves, 9–6. Batting third in the order, Cedeño faced southpaw George Stone for his first plate appearance, and was retired on a fly ball to left field. Leading of the top of the fourth, Cedeño singled off stone for his first major league hit.

==== July ====
Joe Morgan tied a club record starting July 6 by drawing at least one base on balls in each of 11 consecutive contests, enduring until July 20, having been set by teammate Jimmy Wynn starting exactly one year earlier. Morgan drew 14 total walks with this active streak, while slashing.333 / .509 / .462 / .971. He also accrued 7 stolen bases. Alex Bregman later tied this streak, from April 20 to 30, 2019. (Note: The major league record is 22 by Roy Cullenbine, from July 2–22, 1947. Criteria: Longest streak of consecutive games, in the regular season, requiring bases on balls ≥ 1, sorted by most games matching criteria.)

Also on July 6, César Cedeño connected for his first major league home run, off Claude Osteen of the Los Angeles Dodgers, for two runs in the bottom of the sixth inning. The blast gave Houston a 4–3 lead. The game proceeded to extra innings, when the Dodgers harangued Jim Bouton for four runs in the top of the tenth. The Dodgers then withstood a three-run rally led by Pepitone, Rader, and Johnny Edwards in the bottom of the tenth, to hold on for the triumph over Houston, 10–8.

The Astros set all-time franchise records on July 11 by attaining upward of 20 hits and 10 walks, (Note: As of 2025, this is the only game of this type for the Astros. However, it was the fifth in the major leagues in 1970, and sixth since 1962. Criteria: For single games, from 1962 to 2026, in the regular season, requiring bases on balls ≥ 10 and hits ≥ 20, sorted by ascending date.) with 17 runners left on base (LOB), (Note: Surpassed 17 runners LOB on June 2, 1963, versus Milwaukee, and July 27, 1969, versus Philadelphia. Criteria: For single games, from 1962 to 2026, for HOU, in the regular season, sorted by descending runners left on base.) and six intentional base on balls (IBB) during a 5–4, 14-inning victory over the San Francisco Giants. (Note: Remained the team record until July 15, 1984, versus Philadelphia. Criteria: For single games, from 1962 to 2026, for HOU, in the regular season, sorted by descending intentional bases on balls.) The Giants' Willie May, then the active home run leader, entered the contest six hits away from joining the 3,000 hit club. In the first inning, Mays singled off Astros starter Larry Dierker. Through six innings, Dierker was largely unhittable, surrendering just one other hit. Dierker also scored one of the Astros' first two runs. During the top of the seventh, the Giants' Willie McCovey homered (23) to tie the score. In the top of the ninth, Mays connected for his 2,996th and 619th home run to put the Giants ahead, 3–2. Denis Menke knocked a triple in the bottom of the ninth to tie the score again, 3–3. In the top of the 13th Bobby Bonds (14) homered to put the Giants back ahead, 4–3. During the bottom of the 13th, Doug Rader scored on a ground out by Don Bryant. Giants pitching issued 3 IBB to Jimmy Wynn, who drew four walks total. Joe Morgan reached base six times with four hits and two walks, and Jesús Alou also had four hits. The strategy kept San Francisco close, but, during the bottom of the 14th, Johnny Edwards swatted a walk-off sacrifice fly to plate Cedeño for the victory. The Astros accumulated 21 hits, second most in club history at the time. (Note: The record at this time was 23 hits collected on June 7, 1967, versus St. Louis. Criteria: For single games, from 1962 to 1970, for HOU, in the regular season, sorted by descending hits.)

==== August ====
On August 21, Doug Rader connected for his 20th home run of the season, off Jim Bunning of the Philadelphia Phillies. Rader became the first player in team history to hit as many home runs in one season as a third baseman. (Note: In the regular season, from 1962 to 2005, playing for HOU, as 3B (within defensive positions), requiring home runs ≥ 20, sorted by greatest home runs.)

==== September ====
During a 10-day span commencing September 7 on a West Coast road trip, 24-year old slugger Bob Watson crushed his first two career grand slams. The first blast was at San Diego Stadium off a Ron Willis offering during the opener of a doubleheader, a 10–5 triumph over the Padres. Starting pitcher Ken Forsch (1–0) earned his first major league victory, also earning the complete game while overcoming a five-run run rally by San Diego in the bottom of the ninth inning in what was his major league debut. Ten days later at Dodger Stadium, Watson tagged Jim Brewer for a grand slam in the 7th inning that snapped 5–5 tie and was a key play in an Astros 10–5 victory over Los Angeles.

Watson became the second player in team history to hit two grand slams during the same month, joining Bob Aspromonte, who did so twice (a team record), in June 1964 and August 1966. (Note: Two grand slams in one month remained the team record until Alex Bregman hit three in June 2023.) Watson's were the Astros' fourth and fifth grand slams of the season, the latter of which set a team record.

==== Performance overview ====
The Astros concluded the season with a 79–83 (.488) record, for fourth place and 23 games behind the NL West division-champion and NL pennant-winning Cincinnati Reds. Though Houston's record declined by two victories from the year prior, this represented the first time in franchise history they had won at least 79 contests successively, following the period during which they lost at least 90 games in each of their first seven seasons of play. Moreover, the 1970 campaign was also the first in which Houston had closed out as high as fourth place in the standings.

This iteration of the Astros set several then-club records, including scoring 744 runs and hitting 129 home runs, surpassing the 676 tallies obtained the year prior, and 112 home runs in 1966. They remained the club record until 1995 (747 runs) and 1972 (134 home runs). They also set a then-team record with five grand slams, breaking the record of four established just season prior. The record was later tied in 1973 and 1986, and surpassed in 1989 (six).

By swiping 42 bags, Joe Morgan became first player in club history to record two 40-stolen base season, both in catenation. For the team, this signaled the second of a franchise-record nine successive campaigns featuring at least one baserunner who pilfered 40 or more bases. (Note: Number of players that meet criteria in a season, playing for HOU, in the regular season, requiring stolen bases ≥ 40, sorted by ascending instances.)

Third baseman Doug Rader was recognized with his first career Gold Glove Award, thus being first Houston player awarded since pitcher Bobby Shantz in 1962. Shantz played for the Colt .45s for approximately the first month of the franchise's inaugural season prior to being traded. Rader also hit 25 home runs to establish the team record for a single season at his position, which remained so until 2005, when Morgan Ensberg hit 36.

=== League standings ===
==== National League West ====
NL West
Team	W	L	Pct.	GB	Home	Road
Cincinnati Reds	102	60	.630	—	57‍–‍24	45‍–‍36
Los Angeles Dodgers	87	74	.540	14½	39‍–‍42	48‍–‍32
San Francisco Giants	86	76	.531	16	48‍–‍33	38‍–‍43
Houston Astros	79	83	.488	23	44‍–‍37	35‍–‍46
Atlanta Braves	76	86	.469	26	42‍–‍39	34‍–‍47
San Diego Padres	63	99	.389	39	31‍–‍50	32‍–‍49

==== Record versus opponents ====
National League

1970 National League record Sources:
Team	ATL	CHC	CIN	HOU	LAD	MON	NYM	PHI	PIT	SD	SF	STL
Atlanta	—	8–4	5–13	9–9	6–12	6–6	6–6	7–5	6–6	9–9	7–11	7–5
Chicago	4–8	—	7–5	7–5	6–6	13–5	7–11	9–9	8–10	9–3	7–5	7–11
Cincinnati	13–5	5–7	—	15–3	13–5	7–5	8–4	7–5	8–4	8–10	9–9	9–3
Houston	9–9	5–7	3–15	—	8–10	8–4	6–6	4–8	6–6	14–4	10–8	6–6
Los Angeles	12–6	6–6	5–13	10–8	—	8–4	7–5	6–5	6–6	11–7	9–9	7–5
Montreal	6–6	5–13	5–7	4–8	4–8	—	10–8	11–7	9–9	6–6	6–6	7–11
New York	6–6	11–7	4–8	6–6	5–7	8–10	—	13–5	6–12	6–6	6–6	12–6
Philadelphia	5-7	9–9	5–7	8–4	5–6	7–11	5–13	—	4–14	9–3	8–4	8–10
Pittsburgh	6–6	10–8	4–8	6–6	6–6	9–9	12–6	14–4	—	6–6	4–8	12–6
San Diego	9–9	3–9	10–8	4–14	7–11	6–6	6–6	3–9	6–6	—	5–13	4–8
San Francisco	11–7	5–7	9–9	8–10	9–9	6–6	6–6	4–8	8–4	13–5	—	7–5
St. Louis	5–7	11–7	3–9	6–6	5–7	11–7	6–12	10–8	6–12	8–4	5–7	—

=== Notable transactions ===
- June 23, 1970: Mike Marshall was traded by the Astros to the Montreal Expos for Don Bosch.
- July 29, 1970: Joe Pepitone was purchased from the Astros by the Chicago Cubs.
- August 12, 1970: Jim Bouton was released by the Houston Astros.

=== Roster ===
1970 Houston Astros
Roster
Pitchers: 42 Jack Billingham; 36 Wade Blasingame; 56 Jim Bouton; 41 Ron Cook; 39 George Culver; 49 Larry Dierker; 31 Jack DiLauro; 43 Ken Forsch; 48 Fred Gladding; 38 Tom Griffin; 46 Buddy Harris; 23 Denny Lemaster; 53 Mike Marshall; 43 Dan Osinski; 45 Jim Ray; 37 Scipio Spinks; 40 Don Wilson	Catchers: 6 Don Bryant; 7 Johnny Edwards; 10 Larry Howard; Infielders: 14 Marty Martínez; 33 John Mayberry; 11 Denis Menke; 18 Joe Morgan; 9 Joe Pepitone; 12 Doug Rader; 15 Héctor Torres; 8,27 Bob Watson	Outfielders: 22 Jesús Alou; 44 Jim Beauchamp; 28 César Cedeño; 10 Tommy Davis; 19 Gary Geiger; 20 César Gerónimo; 26 Keith Lampard; 21 Norm Miller; 24 Jimmy Wynn; Other batters: 20 Leon McFadden	Manager: 25 Harry Walker; Coaches: 4 Buddy Hancken; 3 Mel McGaha; 5 Jim Owens; 2 Salty Parker

== Game log ==
=== Regular season ===
Legend
	Astros win
	Astros loss
	Postponement
	Eliminated from playoff race
**Bold**	Astros team member

1970 regular season game log: 79–83 (Home: 44–37; Away: 35–46)
April: 7–14 (Home: 6–4; Away: 1–10)

#	Date	Time (CT)	Opponent	Score	Win	Loss	Save	Time of Game	Attendance	Record	Box/ Streak
14	April 20		@ Pirates								
15	April 21		@ Pirates								
16	April 22		@ Pirates								
20	April 28		@ Reds								
21	April 29		@ Reds								

May: 14–15 (Home: 6–7; Away: 8–8)

#	Date	Time (CT)	Opponent	Score	Win	Loss	Save	Time of Game	Attendance	Record	Box/ Streak
28	May 7		Pirates								
29	May 8		Pirates								
30	May 9		Pirates								
31	May 10		Pirates								
41	May 21		Reds								
42	May 22		Reds								
43	May 23		Reds								
44	May 24		Reds								

June: 12–14 (Home: 8–7; Away: 4–7)

#	Date	Time (CT)	Opponent	Score	Win	Loss	Save	Time of Game	Attendance	Record	Box/ Streak
72	June 26		Reds								
73	June 27		Reds								
74	June 28		Reds								

July: 13–14 (Home: 7–7; Away: 6–7)

#	Date	Time (CT)	Opponent	Score	Win	Loss	Save	Time of Game	Attendance	Record	Box/ Streak
78 (1)	July 3		@ Reds								
79 (2)	July 3		@ Reds								
80	July 4		@ Reds								
81	July 5		@ Reds								
—	July 14	7:15 p.m. CDT	**41st All-Star Game in Cincinnati, OH**								
93	July 20		Pirates								
94	July 21		Pirates								
97	July 24		@ Pirates								
98	July 25		@ Pirates								
99	July 26		@ Pirates								

August: 16–13 (Home: 7–7; Away: 9–6)

#	Date	Time (CT)	Opponent	Score	Win	Loss	Save	Time of Game	Attendance	Record	Box/ Streak

September: 16–13 (Home: 9–5; Away: 7–8)

#	Date	Time (CT)	Opponent	Score	Win	Loss	Save	Time of Game	Attendance	Record	Box/ Streak
147	September 15		Reds								
148	September 16		Reds								
153	September 21		@ Reds								
154	September 22		@ Reds								
155	September 23		@ Reds								

October: 1–0 (Home: 1–0; Away: 0–0)

#	Date	Time (CT)	Opponent	Score	Win	Loss	Save	Time of Game	Attendance	Record	Box/ Streak

=== Detailed records ===
National League
Opponent	W	L	WP	RS	RA
NL East
Chicago Cubs	5	7	0.417	47	62
Montreal Expos	8	4	0.667	59	44
New York Mets	6	6	0.500	51	54
Philadelphia Phillies	4	8	0.333	43	55
Pittsburgh Pirates	6	6	0.500	56	64
St. Louis Cardinals	6	6	0.167	63	62
Div Total	35	37	0.486	319	341
NL West
Atlanta Braves	9	9	0.500	88	91
Cincinnati Reds	3	15	0.167	55	81
**Houston Astros**					
Los Angeles Dodgers	8	10	0.444	99	84
San Diego Padres	14	4	0.778	89	66
San Francisco Giants	10	8	0.556	94	100
Div Total	44	46	0.489	425	422
Season Total	79	83	0.488	744	763

Month	Games	Won	Lost	Win %	RS	RA
April	21	7	14	0.333	89	109
May	29	14	15	0.483	142	149
June	26	12	14	0.462	108	99
July	27	13	14	0.481	121	142
August	29	16	13	0.552	138	138
September	29	16	13	0.552	141	122
October	1	1	0	1.000	5	4
Total	162	79	83	0.488	744	763

	Games	Won	Lost	Win %	RS	RA
Home	81	44	37	0.543	350	351
Away	81	35	46	0.432	394	412
Total	162	79	83	0.488	744	763

== Player stats ==
=== Batting ===
==== Starters by position ====
Note: Pos = Position; G = Games played; AB = At bats; H = Hits; Avg. = Batting average; HR = Home runs; RBI = Runs batted in

Pos	Player	G	AB	H	Avg.	HR	RBI
C	Johnny Edwards	140	458	101	.221	7	49
1B	Bob Watson	97	327	89	.272	11	61
2B	Joe Morgan	144	548	147	.268	8	52
SS	Denis Menke	154	562	171	.304	13	92
3B	Doug Rader	156	576	145	.252	25	87
LF	Tommy Davis	57	213	60	.282	3	30
CF	Jimmy Wynn	157	554	156	.282	27	88
RF	Jesús Alou	117	458	140	.306	1	44

==== Other batters ====
Note: G = Games played; AB = At bats; H = Hits; Avg. = Batting average; HR = Home runs; RBI = Runs batted in

Player	G	AB	H	Avg.	HR	RBI
César Cedeño	90	355	110	.310	7	42
Joe Pepitone	75	279	70	.251	14	35
Norm Miller	90	226	54	.239	4	29
Marty Martínez	75	150	33	.220	0	12
John Mayberry	50	148	32	.216	5	14
Larry Howard	31	88	27	.307	2	16
Keith Lampard	53	72	17	.236	0	5
Héctor Torres	31	65	16	.246	0	5
César Gerónimo	47	37	9	.243	0	2
Jim Beauchamp	31	26	5	.192	1	4
Don Bryant	15	24	5	.208	0	3
Gary Geiger	5	4	1	.250	0	0
Leon McFadden	2	0	0	----	0	0

=== Pitching ===
==== Starting pitchers ====
Note: G = Games pitched; IP = Innings pitched; W = Wins; L = Losses; ERA = Earned run average; SO = Strikeouts

Player	G	IP	W	L	ERA	SO
Larry Dierker	37	269.2	16	12	3.87	191
Don Wilson	29	184.1	11	6	3.91	94
Tom Griffin	23	111.1	3	13	5.74	72
Wade Blasingame	13	77.2	3	3	3.48	55
Ken Forsch	4	24.0	1	2	5.63	13

==== Other pitchers ====
Note: G = Games pitched; IP = Innings pitched; W = Wins; L = Losses; ERA = Earned run average; SO = Strikeouts

Player	G	IP	W	L	ERA	SO
Jack Billingham	46	187.2	13	9	3.98	134
Denny Lemaster	39	162.0	7	12	4.56	103
Ron Cook	41	82.1	4	4	3.72	50
Jim Bouton	29	73.1	4	6	5.40	49
Scipio Spinks	5	13.2	0	1	9.88	6

==== Relief pitchers ====
Note: G = Games pitched; W = Wins; L = Losses; SV = Saves; ERA = Earned run average; SO = Strikeouts

Player	G	W	L	SV	ERA	SO
Fred Gladding	63	7	4	18	4.06	46
Jim Ray	52	6	3	5	3.26	67
Jack DiLauro	42	1	3	3	4.28	23
George Culver	32	3	3	3	3.20	31
Mike Marshall	4	0	1	0	8.44	5
Dan Osinski	3	0	1	0	9.82	1
Buddy Harris	2	0	0	0	5.68	2

== Major League Baseball draft ==
Houston Astros 1970 MLB draft selections
Rd.	Slot	Draftee	Position	School	Origin	Signed	Notes	Bio
1	7	Randy Scarbery	Right-handed pitcher	Theodore Roosevelt HS	(California)	N	(Note: Signed with the Oakland Athletics from the 1973 draft.) (Note: MLB debut on April 16, 1979, for the Chicago White Sox)	
2	31	Alton Williams	Shortstop	Webb HS	(North Carolina)	Y		
3	55	Don Stratton	Right-handed pitcher	Los Altos HS	(California)	Y		
4	80	Greg Gross	Outfielder	Red Land HS	(Pennsylvania)	Y	(Note: MLB debut on September 5, 1973, for Houston)	

== Awards and achievements ==
=== Grand slams ===
No.	Date	Astros batter	Venue	Inning	Pitcher	Opposing team	Box
1	June 4	Doug Rader	Astrodome	1 (Note: Tied score or took lead)	Dan McGinn	Montreal Expos	
2	June 10	Joe Pepitone	Astrodome	4	Nolan Ryan	New York Mets	
3	July 9	Denis Menke	Astrodome	1	Alan Foster	Los Angeles Dodgers	
4	September 7 (Note: Game 1 of doubleheader)	Bob Watson (Note: 1st MLB grand slam)	San Diego Stadium	6	Ron Willis	San Diego Padres	
5	September 17	Bob Watson	Dodger Stadium	9	Jim Brewer	Los Angeles Dodgers	

=== Awards ===
1970 Houston Astros award winners
Name of award		Recipient	Ref.
Gold Glove Award	Third baseman	Doug Rader	
Houston Astros Most Valuable Player (MVP)		Joe Morgan	
MLB All-Star Game	Reserve infielder	Joe Morgan	
MLB All-Star Game	Reserve infielder	Denis Menke	

Other awards results

Name of award	Voting recipient(s) (Team)	Ref.
NL Rookie of the Year	1st—Morton (MON) • 4th—Cedeño (HOU)	

=== Milestones ===
==== Major League debuts ====
Player—Appeared at position

- César Cedeño, center fielder
- Ken Forsch, starting pitcher
Date and opponent

- June 20 vs Atlanta
- September 7 at San Diego
Box

Also:

== Minor league system ==
Level	Team	League	Manager
AAA	Oklahoma City 89ers	American Association	Hub Kittle
AA	Columbus Astros	Southern League	Jimmy Williams
A	Cocoa Astros	Florida State League	Tony Pacheco
A-Short Season	Williamsport Astros	New York–Penn League	Dick Bogard
Rookie	Covington Astros	Appalachian League	Dick Smith

Championships

- Southern League champions: Columbus Astros
