= 1969 Houston Astros season =

Eighth season in Major League Baseball for the Houston Astros

1969 Houston Astros
- League: National League
- Division: West
- Ballpark: Astrodome
- City: Houston, Texas
- Record: 81–81 (.500)
- Divisional place: 5th
- Owners: Roy Hofheinz
- General managers: Spec Richardson
- Managers: Harry Walker
- Television: KTRK-TV
- Radio: KPRC (AM) (Gene Elston, Loel Passe, Harry Kalas)

The 1969 Houston Astros season was the eighth season for the Major League Baseball (MLB) franchise located in Houston, Texas, their fifth as the Astros, eighth in the National League (NL), first in the inaugural season of the NL West division, and fifth at The Astrodome. The Astros entered the season with a record of 72–90, in tenth place and 25 games behind the NL pennant-winning St. Louis Cardinals.

With the third wave of expansion in Major League Baseball in 1969, each of the National and American Leagues increased their number of teams from 10 to 12, were bracketed into East and West divisions, and a League Championship Series (LCS) round was inserted prior to the World Series. The season began for Houston at San Diego Stadium on April 8, where the Padres—one of the four expansion teams—hosted and prevailed over the Astros, 2–1. The Astros appointed Don Wilson to his first Opening Day start. For the second time in major league history, starting April 30 at Crosley Field, one series featured two teams who exchanged no-hitters in consecutive games: Jim Maloney of the Cincinnati Reds no-hit the Astros, and, on May 1, Wilson replicated Maloney's feat.

In the MLB amateur draft, the Astros' first round selection was pitcher J. R. Richard, at second overall. At the time, Richard became the highest-selected player in the amateur draft for Houston. Shortstop Denis Menke and pitcher Larry Dierker represented the Astros and played for the National League at the MLB All-Star Game. It was the first career selection for both players. On July 30, Menke and Jimmy Wynn connected for two grand slams in a single inning, a feat not achieved in National League play since 1890. The Astros concluded the season with an 81–81 record and in fifth place, 12 games behind the NL West-champion Atlanta Braves. This represented the first time in franchise history that Houston finished with a record of .500 or higher.

With Wilson, Dierker, and Tom Griffin all reaching the 200 strikeout threshold, this Astros pitching staff became the second with three to reach the 200-strikeout threshold, following the 1967 Minnesota Twins. Astros pitchers threw 1,221 strikeouts, a major league record that lasted until 1996. Griffin was also named The Sporting News NL Rookie Pitcher of the Year. (Note: From 1961–2003, The Sporting News declared one rookie pitcher and position player from each league, the NL and the American League (AL), for this award. Starting in 2004, this system was modified to selecting one rookie from each league for the award, regardless of position.) Right-hander Fred Gladding notched 29 saves to become the second Astros reliever to lead the NL.

== Offseason ==
=== Summary ===
The Astros concluded the 1968 epoch with a record of 72–90 (.444), in tenth place of 10 teams and 25 games behind the repeat NL-pennant winning St. Louis Cardinals. At the time, the 72 wins represented the most in a season in franchise history, tying the 1966 squad. An improvement of three wins from 1967, for the first time, in 1968, the Astros concluded in last place, and was the seventh of their first seven seasons with 90 or more losses. On July 9, 1968, Houston presented the All-Star Game at the Astrodome for the first time. Five days later, on July 14, Don Wilson tied a then-major league record by striking out 18 batters in a nine-inning game.

In 1969, Major League Baseball's third wave of expansion augmented the number of teams in each of the National and American Leagues from 10 to 12, while modifying the leagues' playoff structure. The National League received the Montreal Expos and San Diego Padres, while the American League added the Kansas City Royals and Seattle Pilots. The leagues were split into East and West divisions containing six teams each, which aligned the Astros into the National League West division. Finally, an additional playoff round was introduced prior to the World Series. Each of the division winners would compete in the League Championship Series (LCS) to determine the league pennant winners and qualifiers for the World Series.

=== Transactions ===
- October 14, 1968: Nate Colbert was drafted from the Astros by the San Diego Padres as the 18th pick in the 1968 MLB expansion draft.
- December 2, 1968: Bo Belinsky was drafted from the Astros by the St. Louis Cardinals in the 1968 rule 5 draft.
- December 4, 1968: Mike Cuellar, Enzo Hernández, and Elijah Johnson were traded by the Astros to the Baltimore Orioles for Curt Blefary and John Mason.
- January 22, 1969: Rusty Staub was traded by the Astros to the Montreal Expos for Jesús Alou and Donn Clendenon. Clendenon refused to report to the Astros. The Expos sent Jack Billingham, Skip Guinn, and $100,000 to the Astros on April 8, 1969, as compensation.
- February 12, 1969: Byron Browne was purchased from the Astros by the St. Louis Cardinals.

== Regular season ==
=== Summary ===
==== April ====
Opening Day starting lineup
Uniform	Player	Position
22	Jesús Alou	Right fielder
18	Joe Morgan	Second baseman
21	Norm Miller	Center fielder
12	Doug Rader	Third baseman
13	Curt Blefary	First baseman
27	Bob Watson	Left fielder
11	Denis Menke	Shortstop
7	Johnny Edwards	Catcher
40	Don Wilson	Pitcher
Venue: San Diego Stadium • San Diego 2, Houston 1 Sources:

On April 8, the expansion team Padres and co-occupants within the National League West division, hosted the Houston Astros at San Diego Stadium for the first-ever regular-season contest in Padres history. The Astros kicked off the scoring in the top of the first inning when Doug Rader singled in Joe Morgan off Padres starter Dick Selma. Don Wilson, the Astros' Opening Day starting pitcher, kept the brand new franchise from realizing their first hit and run until the bottom of the fifth inning, when Ed Spezio cranked a home run to tie the score, 1–1. However, the Astros neither scored for the rest of game, losing 2–1, nor for the rest of the series, the victims of shutout by the Padres on consecutive 2–0 decisions for the final two games. Hence, the Padres swept the Astros in their very first series, in a mirror image of how the expansion Houston Colt .45s dispatched their very first opponent, the Chicago Cubs, during their inaugural series.

For the third contest of the season, April 10, right-hander Tom Griffin made his Major League debut. He started versus the Padres and took the loss. Griffin issued a base on balls to the first batter, Rafael Robles, but Robles was neutralized on a caught stealing by catcher Johnny Edwards. Griffin then whiffed Roberto Peña and Ollie Brown for his first and second strikeouts and retire the side. Brown later homered off Griffin, who hurled seven innings, and relinquished three hits, five walks, and both San Diego tallies, while attaining eight strikeouts and a game score of 66.

Having dropped their first five contests to start the season, on April 13, the Astros defeated the Los Angeles Dodgers, 5–2, to secure their first win of the 1969 campaign. Don Wilson authored a masterpiece, going the distance with 10 strikeouts, a game score of 80, while surrendering two unearned runs to earn his first victory of the season. Denis Menke took Don Drysdale deep in the bottom of the second, and in the next inning, Doug Rader belted a three-run home run off Drysdale before he exited two batters later. Jimmy Wynn added a home run in the fifth inning. This began a three-game winning streak.

Tom Griffin earned his first major league victory on April 12, going 8 1/3 innings pitched with 12 strikeouts against the Atlanta Braves. Griffin surrendered four hits and three walks as Houston won, 4–2.

On April 16, César Gerónimo made his major league debut, going hitless in one at bat versus the Atlanta Braves.

Juan Marichal led a four-hitter against Houston on April 26 as the San Francisco Giants won, 2–1, at Candlestick Park. He struck out eight Astros. Willie Mays starred offensively, belting his 590th career home run, while also collecting a single in the fifth inning and later scoring.

During Game One of a doubleheader on April 27 at Candlestick Park, Héctor Torres hit his first grand slam in the major leagues, off Ray Sadecki during the top of the second inning to break a scoreless tie. Joe Morgan (2) also homered, but the Giants rallied to tie the score in the bottom of the sixth inning, and scored four times in the bottom of the seventh. Willie McCovey (7) and Jack Hiatt (4) each homered and drove in three runs for San Francisco to win, 8–5.

On April 30, Jim Maloney of the Cincinnati Reds tossed a no-hitter to lead an outright embarrassment of Houston by a 10–0 score at Crosley Field. Maloney whiffed 13 Astros and walked five, the final intentionally to Jimmy Wynn with the bases empty and two outs in the ninth inning. Maloney then fanned Doug Rader to polish off the contest, securing the no-hitter to punctuate a losing streak for Houston that slid to eight games, their lengthiest losing streak of the year. Moreover, the Astros had won just once in their previous 15 contests.

During their first month of divisional play, the Astros floundered, exiting April with a 4–20 (.167) record.

==== Don Wilson's no-hitter ====
The day after being no-hit, on May 1, Don Wilson returned the favor to the Reds at Crosley Field, achieving just the second instance in major league history that successive no-hitters transpired. (Note: The first time two hurlers exchanged consecutive no-hitters within the same series had occurred just the season prior when Gaylord Perry of the San Francisco Giants no-hit the St. Louis Cardinals, 1–0, at Candlestick Park on September 17, 1968. The following day, Ray Washburn no-hit the Giants for a 2–0 Cardinals triumph.) Wilson's second career ho-hitter, he had yet to turn 25 years old, and became the first pitcher in club history to fire two no-hitters. He punched out 13 as Houston triumphed, 4–0, to halt the Astros' already season-long losing streak at eight games. Wilson struck out 11 different Reds batters, with none more than twice, and attained a game score of 94. Doug Rader led off the top of the fourth inning with a home run to left to break the scoreless tie. In the next inning, Denis Menke doubled in Jimmy Wynn and Joe Morgan to augment Houston's lead to 3–0. Wilson also hit a sacrifice fly in the top of the eighth that drove home Curt Blefary. Durign the bottom of the ninth, Wilson retired Tommy Helms on a foul popup as the final batter to complete the masterpiece.

Wilson's no-hit effort made him the 21st major league pitcher to toss multiple no-hit outings during his career. The hurler who had preceded Wilson in this execution was none other than Maloney, by one day. Maloney had thrown his first no-hit game in 1965. (Note: Number of games in a career player meets criteria, in complete games, in the regular season, requiring hits allowed = 0, sorted by ascending instances.)

==== Rest of May ====
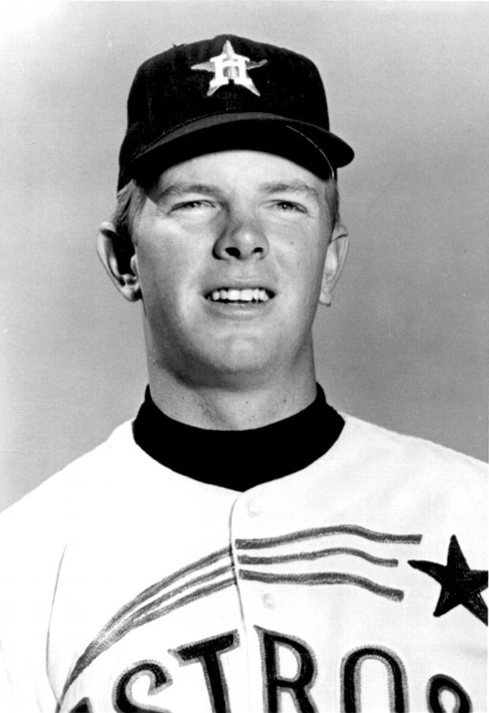
Larry Dierker (in his 1966 photocard) became the first Astro to win 20 or more games.

With the Astros down 1–0 on May 3 at the Astrodome, catcher Don Bryant hit a deep blast off Bobby Bolin with Jesús Alou on second to give Houston a 2–1 lead during the third inning. This was the first and only home run of Bryant's career. The Astros did not relinquish the lead, and held on for a 4–3 win over the San Francisco Giants.

On May 4, first baseman Curt Blefary participated in seven double plays, an MLB record for first basemen during a 9-inning game. Concurrently, the Astros established a Major League record by inducing seven double plays grounded into, with San Francisco as the collateral damage.

Larry Dierker struck out career-high 14 on May 7 in a five-hit complete game. Dieker (4–3) led a 6–1 triumph over the Philadelphia Phillies, including hitting a single and scoring a run. During the top of the fifth inning, Jimmy Wynn (5) swatted a three-run home run off Phillies starter Jerry Johnson (4–3). Norm Miller collected three hits. doubled (5), and Doug Rader also had three hits and an RBI.

Down 6–1 after seven innings on May 8, the Astros rallied for three runs in the eighth and continued the uprising with another three-run frame in the ninth to claims a 7–6 road victory over the Philadelphia Phillies. Catcher Johnny Edwards drove in the game-winning run with a two-run single.

The Astros ventured to Jarry Park Stadium in Canada on May 13 for their first-ever international game to face the Montreal Expos, another expansion club playing out their inaugural season. Infielder Doug Rader knocked 3 runs batted in (RBI) to lead a 10–3 victory for Houston.

On May 27, Doug Rader hit the third walk-off grand slam in team history, (Note: Rader's walk-off grand slam succeeded Bob Aspromonte's (who had hit the first two) on August 26, 1966, and preceded Milt May's on May 22, 1974.) rewarding Don Wilson (5–4) for his 13-strikeout gem as the winning pitcher and 6–2 triumph over the Phillies. The slam was also the first of Rader's career and eleventh career home run. The following game, an analogous scenario transpired as Rader strode to the plate in the bottom of the 10th inning with the bases loaded and score tied with Philadelphia, 6–6. This time, Rader drew a base on balls to thrust home the decisive run for another walk-off victory. Concurrently, the win tied Houston's club-record 10-game winning streak.

On May 30, Tom Griffin golfed his first major league home run from the batter's box, an inside-the-park circuit to the center-field gap at Forbes Field. The drive was off Bob Moose of the Pittsburgh Pirates during the top of the second inning.

==== June—July ====
Starting June 4, and continuing until August 3, Jimmy Wynn scaled an on-base streak to 52 games to set the franchise record. He batted .322, with a .500 on-base percentage (OBP) and .586 slugging percentage (SLG), garnering 56 hits and 63 bases on balls (BB). Wynn's streak trailed the NL record by 6 games, held by Duke Snider, who reached base at least once each game from May 13–July 11, 1954. Meanwhile, from June 25–August 18, 1975, Greg Gross proceeded to reach base 52 consecutive games, which equaled Wynn for the franchise record.

On June 5, Joe Morgan's 4-fort-4 day with a home run and four runs scored led a Houston win over the St. Louis Cardinals, 11–6. Astros starter Larry Dierker, on 24-hour leave from duty with the Army on June 8, outdueled Cardinals ace Steve Carlton over 11 innings. Dierker capped off the night by hitting the game-winning run batted in (RBI) for a 2–1 win.

Right-hander Fred Gladding established a club record by converting his 14th consecutive save on June 13, with this scintilla having begun on June 18 of the year prior. During save situations, Gladding allowing just 14 baserunners of 60 total batters faced, 11 hits over 17 1/3 innings, surrendering no runs. Gladding's feat remained the franchise longest until Dave Smith converted 15th consecutive on June 11, 1987, until totaling 18 on July 2, 1987. (Note: Longest streak of consecutive games, up to 2003, playing for HOU, in the regular season, requiring saves ≥ 1, sorted by most games matching criteria.)

Wynn established another club record starting July 6 by drawing at least one base on balls in each of 11 consecutive contests, enduring until July 15. Wynn drew 18 total walks with this active streak, while slashing.294 / .538 / .647 / 1.186. He also slammed 4 home runs and acquired 4 stolen bases. Exactly one year after Wynn commenced his streak, Morgan began his own record-tying period, while Alex Bregman achieved the same in 2019. (Note: The major league record is 22 by Roy Cullenbine, from July 2–22, 1947. Criteria: Longest streak of consecutive games, in the regular season, requiring bases on balls ≥ 1, sorted by most games matching criteria.)

==== MLB All-Star break ====
Houston entered the All-Star break even with a 48–48 record on the heels of a 10–9, 11-inning defeat to the Reds. The Astros scored 5 in the top of the 4th to mount an 8–0 lead, capped by Denis Menke's two-run single. They added another in the top of the sixth courtesy of Menke's single to score Sandy Valdespino to go up 9–0. However, Cincinnati answered with nine of their own, including rocking relievers Jim Ray and Skip Guinn for six, capped by a two-run double by Pete Rose and three-run home run by Bobby Tolan. In the bottom of the tenth, Ted Savage singled off Jack Billingham to score Tony Pérez for the walk-off.

The following day, the Apollo 11 mission, launched by NASA, landed on the Moon. By extension of the presence of the at Johnson Space Center in Houston, the Astros baseball club was named in honor of space exploration (the astronaut).

==== Two grand slams in one inning: Jimmy Wynn and Denis Menke ====
Houston swept a July 30 doubleheader from the New York Mets at Shea Stadium. In the opener, Denis Menke and Wynn both connected for grand slams in the ninth inning to cap a double-routing of the Mets, 16–3 and 11–5. The double slam event by one team during the same inning was the first to occur in the National League in 79 years, last accomplished on August 16, 1890. Malachi Kittridge and Tom Burns of the Chicago Colts went deep against the Pittsburgh Alleghenys. (Note: The subsequent two-grand slam event in a single inning by one team in a National League contest was by one player himself, Fernando Tatís, on April 23, 1999, a member of the St. Louis Cardinals.) As of 2025, this was the only instance in which the Astros connected for two grand slams in the same inning. The Astros next hit two during the same game on June 8, 2014. In the nightcap, Dierker took Nolan Ryan deep, and reliever Fred Gladding, mired in a decade-long slump at the plate, laced a bloop single for the only hit in his major league career.

On April 12, 1980, Cecil Cooper and Don Money of the Milwaukee Brewers became the next teammate duo in Major League Baseball, and first in the American League, to connect for two grand slams during the same inning. Cooper later managed the Astros from 2007 to 2009.

==== August—October ====
The Astros attained the stratum as high as 10 games over .500 on August 13 (63–53 (.543)) following an 8–2 victory over New York. Since May 1, they had played to a 59–33 (.641) record.

Gladding authored another consecutive-saves streak, this time posting 12 in succession, through August 17. It had started July 2. Gladding surrendered 10 hits and 2 runs over 14 2/3 innings during save situations, yielding a 1.23 earned run average (ERA).

The Astros season from August 26 to October 2 was featured in Jim Bouton's book, Ball Four. On September 19, Bouton struck out Tony Pérez of the Cincinnati Reds and made baseball history. With that strikeout, the pitching staff of the 1969 edition of the Houston Astros broke the then-National League record for most strikeouts in a season with 1,123 strikeouts. Ironically, on a staff brimming with power pitchers, it was Bouton's knuckleball that procured the historic whiff. The team finished the year with 1,221 strikeouts, which stood as the National League record until 1996, when it was broken by the Atlanta Braves. The Astros were the second team to have three pitchers with 200 strikeouts, with only the 1967 Minnesota Twins having accomplished the feat. Since then, only the 2013 Detroit Tigers have accomplished the feat. The three hurlers who realized the 200-strikeout threshold for the Astros in 1969 included Wilson (235), Dierker (232), and rookie Tom Griffin (200).

On September 15, Keith Lampard made his major league debut and singled in his first at bat.

Dierker attained his 20th win on September 17 to become the first Astros pitcher to do so in one season, leading 2–1 triumph over San Francisco. Jim Wynn and Doug Rader each went deep off Gaylord Perry to back Dierker. Meanwhile, Willie Mays—the main attraction for Giants fans on the cusp of his own milestone—remained temporarily stalled in his quest for a 600th home run. Dierker and Bouton combined to limit Mays to a single and two bases on balls. The win put the Astros back to five games over .500 while trailing first place by 5 1/2 games.

During the matchup in which Bouton fanned Pérez for the record 1,123rd strikeout on September 19, English native Keith Lampard, inserted as a pinch hitter, blasted a walk-off home run from a Wayne Granger offering, the first and only round-tripper of Lampard's career. With Jim Wynn aboard in the bottom of the ninth, the drive consummated a final of Houston 3, Cincinnati 2. So exhilarant of this good fortune, Lampard nearly overran Wynn on basepaths. Meanwhile, Wynn fully engaged strike zone mastery by wheedling four bases on balls, his first bout with as many.

On September 30, southpaw Denny Lemaster tossed a four-hit complete game victory to obtain Houston's 81st victory of the season, and improve his personal record to 13–17. Lemaster outdueled Don Sutton (17–18) and the Los Angeles Dodgers, 6–3, and struck out 11 to yield a game score of 78. At the plate, Lemaster hit an RBI single. Tonny Davis (7) and Norm Miller (4) both went deep for Houston, Curt Blefary collected two hits and two RBI, and Joe Morgan added two safeties, two runs scored, and two stolen bases (49). The Astros' win (81–79) placed them two games behind the Dodgers (83–77) with two games remaining in the regular season at Dodger Stadium. For the first time in team history, the Astros won as many as 81 to procure a ledger of at least .500.

==== Performance summary ====
The Astros concluded the premier season of division play with an 81–81 (.500) record, for fifth place and 12 games behind the NL West division-champion Atlanta Braves. For the first time in franchise history, the Astros reached the .500 mark which simultaneously represented a then-franchise record for wins, following the period during which they lost at least 90 games in each of their first seven seasons of play. The 12 games behind was also their closest-to-first place finish. The Astros would not lose 90 or more games over successive campaigns for more than four decades until 2010 to 2014.

In 2018, the Astros would reprise their status as the league record-holders for strikeouts by a pitching staff in a single season; in fact, they broke the all-time MLB record with 1,687 whiffs.

Houston belted four walk-off home runs to lead the National league and tie the Chicago White Sox and Kansas City Royals for the Major League lead. Each of Houston's was hit by a different player (Rader, Morgan, Meinke, and Lampard). Houston also paced the National League in stolen bases (101).

Meanwhile, Dierker became Houston's first-ever 20-game winner to lead the club's first regular-season record as high as .500 and 81 wins. His 20 wins ranked fifth in the National League. Dierker set other club records, including 20 complete games and 305 1/3 innings pitched.

Wilson's 235 strikeouts established another record, while Dierker (232) also passed the prior record of 203 set by Turk Farrell in Houston's augural season of 1962 and equaled by Mike Cuellar in 1967. Wilson's remained the club record until J. R. Richard whiffed 303 in 1978. (Note: For single seasons, playing for HOU, in the regular season, requiring strikeouts ≥ 200, sorted by ascending season.)

Wynn drew 148 bases on balls to tie Eddie Stanky of the Brooklyn Dodgers in 1945 for the National League record. At the time, the major league record of 170 was held by Babe Ruth of the New York Yankees in 1923 in the American League (AL), and other hitters who were ahead of the NL record included Ted Williams (3 seasons), Eddie Yost, Eddie Joost and Ruth again (1923). (Note: The NL record was passed by Mark McGwire of the St. Louis Cardinals in 1998 and Jeff Bagwell broke the club record in 1999.)

Joe Morgan led the Astros by pilfering 49 bases, also tying the then-club record. This was the first of a franchise-record nine successive campaigns featuring at least one baserunner with 40 or more stolen bases. (Note: Number of players that meet criteria in a season, playing for HOU, in the regular season, requiring stolen bases ≥ 40, sorted by ascending instances.)

Fred Gladding converted 29 saves to lead the National League. Gladding became the second Colt .45s/Astros closer to lead the Senior Circuit in saves, joining Hal Woodeshick in 1964.

Griffin was named The Sporting News NL Rookie Pitcher of the Year, the first Astros rookie pitcher to be recognized for the award and was preceded by Morgan in 1965 (position player) as the second Astros rookie overall to be so named.

=== League standings ===
==== National League West ====
NL West
Team	W	L	Pct.	GB	Home	Road
Atlanta Braves	93	69	.574	—	50‍–‍31	43‍–‍38
San Francisco Giants	90	72	.556	3	52‍–‍29	38‍–‍43
Cincinnati Reds	89	73	.549	4	50‍–‍31	39‍–‍42
Los Angeles Dodgers	85	77	.525	8	50‍–‍31	35‍–‍46
Houston Astros	81	81	.500	12	52‍–‍29	29‍–‍52
San Diego Padres	52	110	.321	41	28‍–‍53	24‍–‍57

==== Record versus opponents ====
National League

1969 National League record Sources:
Team	ATL	CHC	CIN	HOU	LAD	MON	NYM	PHI	PIT	SD	SF	STL
Atlanta	—	3–9	12–6	15–3	9–9	8–4	4–8	6–6	8–4	13–5	9–9	6–6
Chicago	9–3	—	6–6–1	8–4	6–6	10–8	8–10	12–6	7–11	11–1	6–6	9–9
Cincinnati	6–12	6–6–1	—	9–9	10–8	8–4	6–6	10–2	5–7	11–7	10–8	8–4
Houston	3–15	4–8	9–9	—	6–12	11–1	10–2	8–4	3–9	10–8	10–8	7–5
Los Angeles	9–9	6–6	8–10	12–6	—	10–2	4–8	8–4	8–4	12–6	5–13	3–9
Montreal	4–8	8–10	4–8	1–11	2–10	—	5–13	11–7	5–13	4–8	1–11	7–11
New York	8–4	10–8	6–6	2–10	8–4	13–5	—	12–6	10–8	11–1	8–4	12–6
Philadelphia	6-6	6–12	2–10	4–8	4–8	7–11	6–12	—	10–8	8–4	3–9	7–11
Pittsburgh	4–8	11–7	7–5	9–3	4–8	13–5	8–10	8–10	—	10–2	5–7	9–9
San Diego	5–13	1–11	7–11	8–10	6–12	8–4	1–11	4–8	2–10	—	6–12	4–8
San Francisco	9–9	6–6	8–10	8–10	13–5	11–1	4–8	9–3	7–5	12–6	—	3–9
St. Louis	6–6	9–9	4–8	5–7	9–3	11–7	6–12	11–7	9–9	8–4	9–3	—

=== Notable transactions ===
- May 7, 1969: Oscar Zamora was signed as a free agent by the Astros.
- August 24, 1969: Dooley Womack and Roric Harrison were traded by the Astros to the Seattle Pilots for pitcher Jim Bouton.

=== Roster ===
1969 Houston Astros
Roster
Pitchers: 42 Jack Billingham; 36 Wade Blasingame; 44 Jim Bouton; 31 Danny Coombs; 49 Larry Dierker; 48 Fred Gladding; 38 Tom Griffin; 35 Skip Guinn; 41 Bill Henry; 23 Denny Lemaster; 45 Jim Ray; 41 Dan Schneider; 37 Scipio Spinks; 47 Bob Watkins; 43 Ron Willis; 40 Don Wilson; 37 Dooley Womack	Catchers: 6 Don Bryant; 7 Johnny Edwards; Infielders: 13 Curt Blefary; 17 Julio Gotay; 11 Denis Menke; 18 Joe Morgan; 12 Doug Rader; 15 Héctor Torres	Outfielders: 22 Jesús Alou; 10 Tommy Davis; 19 Gary Geiger; 34 César Gerónimo; 26 Keith Lampard; 14 Marty Martínez; 20 Leon McFadden; 21 Norm Miller; 28 Sandy Valdespino; 27 Bob Watson; 24 Jimmy Wynn; Other batters: 33 John Mayberry	Manager: 25 Harry Walker; Coaches: 4 Buddy Hancken; 3 Mel McGaha; 5 Jim Owens; 2 Salty Parker

== Player stats ==
= Indicates team leader

=== Batting ===
==== Starters by position ====
Note: Pos = Position; G = Games played; AB = At bats; H = Hits; Avg. = Batting average; HR = Home runs; RBI = Runs batted in

Pos	Player	G	AB	H	Avg.	HR	RBI
C	Johnny Edwards	151	496	115	.232	6	50
1B	Curt Blefary	155	542	137	.253	12	67
2B	Joe Morgan	147	535	126	.236	15	43
SS	Denis Menke	154	553	149	.269	10	90
3B	Doug Rader	155	569	140	.246	11	83
LF	Jesús Alou	115	452	112	.248	5	34
CF	Jim Wynn	149	495	133	.269	33	87
RF	Norm Miller	119	409	108	.264	4	50

==== Other batters ====
Note: G = Games played; AB = At bats; H = Hits; Avg. = Batting average; HR = Home runs; RBI = Runs batted in

Player	G	AB	H	Avg.	HR	RBI
Marty Martínez	78	198	61	.308	0	15
Gary Geiger	93	125	28	.224	0	16
Sandy Valdespino	41	119	29	.244	0	12
Julio Gotay	46	81	21	.259	0	9
Tommy Davis	24	79	19	.241	1	9
Leon McFadden	44	74	13	.176	0	3
Héctor Torres	34	69	11	.159	1	8
Don Bryant	31	59	11	.186	1	6
Bob Watson	20	40	11	.275	0	3
Keith Lampard	9	12	3	.250	1	2
César Gerónimo	28	8	2	.250	0	0
John Mayberry	5	4	0	.000	0	0

=== Pitching ===
= Indicates league leader

==== Starting pitchers ====
Note: G = Games pitched; IP = Innings pitched; W = Wins; L = Losses; ERA = Earned run average; SO = Strikeouts

Player	G	IP	W	L	ERA	SO
Larry Dierker	39	305.1	20	13	2.33	232
Denny Lemaster	38	244.2	13	17	3.16	173
Don Wilson	34	225.0	16	12	4.00	235
Tom Griffin	31	188.1	11	10	3.54	200

==== Other pitchers ====
Note: G = Games pitched; IP = Innings pitched; W = Wins; L = Losses; ERA = Earned run average; SO = Strikeouts

Player	G	IP	W	L	ERA	SO
Jim Ray	40	115.0	8	2	3.91	115
Wade Blasingame	26	52.0	0	5	5.37	33

==== Relief pitchers ====
Note: G = Games pitched; W = Wins; L = Losses; SV = Saves; ERA = Earned run average; SO = Strikeouts

Player	G	W	L	SV	ERA	SO
Fred Gladding	57	4	8	29	4.21	40
Jack Billingham	52	6	7	2	4.25	71
Dooley Womack	30	2	1	0	3.51	32
Skip Guinn	28	1	2	0	6.67	33
Jim Bouton	16	0	2	1	4.11	32
Danny Coombs	8	0	1	0	6.75	3
Dan Schneider	6	0	1	0	13.50	3
Bob Watkins	5	0	0	0	5.17	11
Bill Henry	3	0	0	0	0.00	2
Ron Willis	3	0	0	0	0.00	2
Scipio Spinks	1	0	0	0	0.00	4
Marty Martínez	1	0	0	0	13.50	0

== Major League Baseball draft ==
Houston Astros 1969 MLB draft selections
Rd.	Slot	Draftee	Position	School	Origin	Signed	Notes	Bio
1	4	J. R. Richard	Right-handed pitcher	Lincoln High (Ruston, LA)	(Louisiana)	Y	(Note: MLB debut on September 15, 1971, for Houston)	
2	24	Stan Papi	Shortstop	Bullard High	(California)	Y	(Note: MLB debut on April 11, 1974, for the St. Louis Cardinals)	
3	50	Harlan Keller	Catcher	William Howard Taft Charter	(Oklahoma)	Y		
4	74	Larry Elenes	Right-handed pitcher	Western High	(California)	Y		
14	314	Mike Easler	Third baseman	Benedictine High	(Ohio)	Y	(Note: MLB debut on September 5, 1973, for Houston)	

== Awards and achievements ==
=== Grand slams ===
No.	Date	Astros batter	Venue	Inning	Pitcher	Opposing team	Box
1	April 27 (Note: Game 1 of doubleheader)	Héctor Torres (Note: 1st MLB grand slam)	Candlestick Park	2 (Note: Tied score or took lead)	Ray Sadecki	San Francisco Giants	
2	May 27	Doug Rader	Astrodome	9 (Note: Walk-off)	Luis Peraza	Philadelphia Phillies	
3	July 30	Jimmy Wynn	Shea Stadium	9 (Note: First occurrence since August 16, 1890, CHI vs PIT)	Ron Taylor	New York Mets	
4	July 30	Denis Menke	Shea Stadium	9	Cal Koonce	New York Mets	

=== Pitching achievements ===
==== No-hit game ====
Date	Pitcher	IP	BB	BR	K	BF	Catcher	Final	Opponent	Venue	Plate umpire	Box
May 1, 1969	Don Wilson	9	6	7	13	34	Don Bryant	4–0	Cincinnati Reds	Crosley Field	Satch Davidson	
May 1, 1969	Wilson: Game score: 94 • Win (2–3)											

==== No-hit bid ====
Date	Starting pitcher (IP)	Relief pitcher(s) (IP)	No-hit IP	GS	Catcher	Batter	Final	Opponent	Box
September 13, 1969	Larry Dierker (12)	—	8 2/3	95	Johnny Edwards	Félix Millán	2–3	Atlanta Braves	
Note: Includes those games started with 7 or more perfect innings.

==== Single-season franchise records ====
- 20 wins —Larry Dierker—until 1979: Joe Niekro 21 wins
- 20 complete games—Larry Dierker—incumbent
- 305 1/3 innings pitched—Larry Dierker—incumbent

=== Offensive achievements ===
- Franchise record:
  - On-base in consecutive games, 52: Jimmy Wynn, June 4–August 3—tied, Greg Gross, 1975
  - Single season, 148 bases on balls: Jimmy Wynn——until 1999, Jeff Bagwell, 149

=== Awards ===
1969 Houston Astros award winners
Name of award		Recipient	Ref.
Houston Astros Most Valuable Player Award (MVP)		Larry Dierker	
MLB All-Star Game	Reserve pitcher	Larry Dierker	
MLB All-Star Game	Reserve infielder	Denis Menke	
The Sporting News NL Rookie Pitcher of the Year		Tom Griffin	

Other awards results

Name of award	Voting recipient(s) (Team)	Ref.
NL Most Valuable Player	1st—McCovey (SFG) • 15th, tied—Menke (HOU) • 15th, tied—Wynn (HOU); Other Astros: 23rd—Dierker • 36th—Edwards	

=== League leaders ===
NL batting leaders

- Bases on balls: Jimmy Wynn (148—led MLB)

NL pitching leaders

- Saves: Fred Gladding (29)
- Strikeouts per nine innings pitched (K/9): Tom Griffin (9.558—led MLB)
- Wild pitches: Don Wilson (16—led MLB)

=== Milestones ===
==== Major League debuts ====
Player—Appeared at position

- Tom Griffin, starting pitcher
- César Gerónimo, pinch hitter
- Keith Lampard, pinch hitter
Date and opponent

- April 10 at San Diego
- April 16 vs Atlanta
- September 15 at San Diego
Box

Also:

== Minor league system ==
Level	Team	League	Manager
AAA	Oklahoma City 89ers	American Association	Cot Deal
AA	Savannah Senators (Note: Savannah affiliation shared with Washington Senators.)	Southern League	Hub Kittle
A	Peninsula Astros	Carolina League	Tony Pacheco
A	Cocoa Astros	Florida State League	Leo Posada
A-Short Season	Williamsport Astros	New York–Penn League	Billy Smith
Rookie	Covington Astros	Appalachian League	Dick Bogard

== See also ==
- List of Major League Baseball annual saves leaders
- List of Major League Baseball no-hitters
