= Bobby Watkins =

Bobby or Robert Watkins may refer to:

- Bobby Watkins (running back) (Robert Archbald Watkins Jr., 1932–2022), American football running back
- Bobby Watkins (cornerback) (Bobby Lawrence Watkins, born 1960), American football cornerback
- Bob Watkins (Robert Cecil Watkins, born 1948), American baseball pitcher
- Robert Dorsey Watkins (1900–1986), United States federal judge
