= List of Houston Astros seasons =

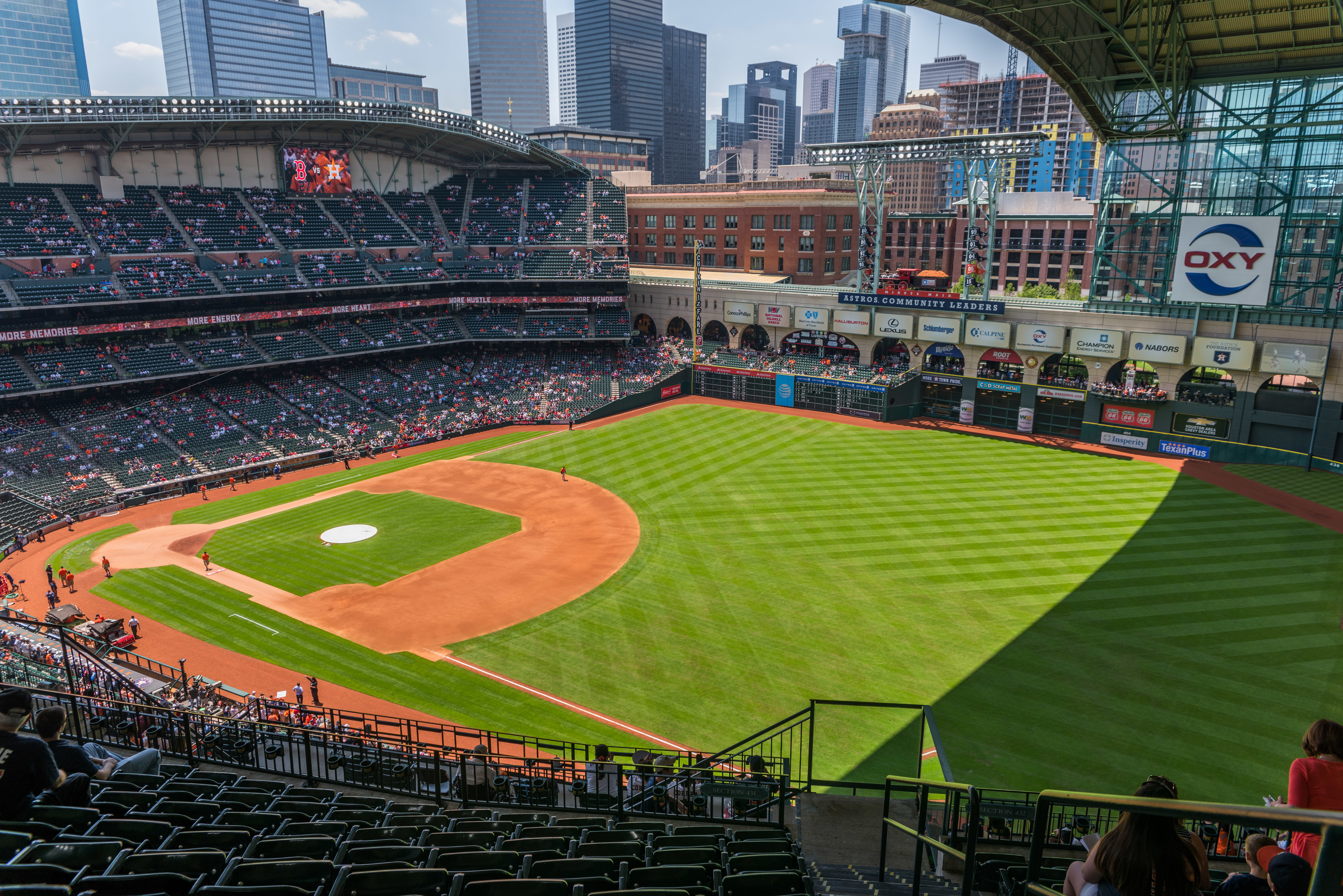
Daikin Park, home field of the Astros since the 2000 season.

This is a list of seasons completed by the Houston Astros, originally known as the Houston Colt .45s, a professional baseball franchise based in Houston, Texas; they played in the National League from their inception in 1962 to the 2012 season; in 2013, the team was moved to the American League.

The Astros in total have completed 65 seasons in Major League Baseball, qualifying for the postseason nineteen times and reaching the World Series five times (2005, 2017, 2019, 2021 and 2022) with two world championships (2017, 2022). The team was established as an expansion franchise in 1962, one of eight teams that was created in the decade. The team's first winning season was in 1972. In 1980, the Astros made their first postseason appearance. From 1997 to 2005, the team made postseason appearances in six out of nine seasons. From 2006 to 2013, the franchise experienced a steady decline, bottoming out with three consecutive 100-loss seasons in 2011, 2012, and 2013. In 2015, the team defeated the New York Yankees in the 2015 American League Wild Card Game. This was the Astros' first postseason appearance as an American League team, and first overall since 2005. It was also the Astros' first playoff win since Game 6 of the 2005 National League Championship Series. Houston would qualify for the playoffs again in 2017, defeating the Boston Red Sox in the 2017 American League Division Series and the New York Yankees in the 2017 American League Championship Series. The team would go on to defeat the Los Angeles Dodgers in the 2017 World Series, winning the championship for the first time in team history. The Astros are one of just a few teams in MLB history to post three consecutive 100-win seasons, a record oddly symmetrical with the three consecutive 100-loss seasons posted several years prior during their rebuild. During this esteemed era of baseball from 2015 to 2026, they have reached the playoffs ten times in a span of twelve seasons (after having appeared in the postseason nine times total from 1962 to 2005).

Through 65 seasons of baseball (62 while known as the Astros), the Astros have recorded 39 seasons at .500 or better (with five exactly at .500) and have qualified for the playoffs nineteen times; of the fourteen expansion teams that have been created since 1961, their nineteen appearances are the most for any team. They are the only team in the history of Wild Card era baseball to play in seven consecutive League Championship Series and also the only expansion era team with an all-time record above .500.

== Regular season record-by-year ==
World Series Champions (1903–present) †	NL/AL Champions (1901–present) *	Division Champions (1969–present) ^	Wild Card Berth (1994–present) ¤	Winning Season

Season	Team	Level	League	Division	Finish	Wins	Losses	Win%	GB	Playoffs	Awards
Houston Colt .45s
1962	1962	MLB	NL		8th	64	96	.400	36½		
1963	1963	MLB	NL		9th	66	96	.407	33		
1964	1964	MLB	NL		9th	66	96	.407	27		
Houston Astros
1965	1965	MLB	NL		9th	65	97	.401	32		
1966	1966	MLB	NL		8th	72	90	.444	23		
1967	1967	MLB	NL		9th	69	93	.426	32½		
1968	1968	MLB	NL		10th	72	90	.444	25		
1969	1969	MLB	NL	West	5th	81	81	.500	25		
1970	1970	MLB	NL	West	4th	79	83	.488	23		Doug Rader (Gold Glove)
1971	1971	MLB	NL	West	T-4th	79	83	.488	11		Doug Rader (Gold Glove)
1972	1972	MLB	NL	West	T-2nd	84	69	.549	10½		César Cedeño (Gold Glove); Doug Rader (Gold Glove)
1973	1973	MLB	NL	West	4th	82	80	.506	17		César Cedeño (Gold Glove); Roger Metzger (Gold Glove); Doug Rader (Gold Glove)
1974	1974	MLB	NL	West	4th	81	81	.500	21		César Cedeño (Gold Glove); Doug Rader (Gold Glove)
1975	1975	MLB	NL	West	6th	64	97	.398	43½		César Cedeño (Gold Glove)
1976	1976	MLB	NL	West	3rd	80	82	.494	22		César Cedeño (Gold Glove)
1977	1977	MLB	NL	West	3rd	81	81	.500	17		
1978	1978	MLB	NL	West	5th	74	88	.457	21		
1979	1979	MLB	NL	West	2nd	89	73	.549	1½		
1980	1980	MLB	NL	West ^	1st^{[A]}	93	70	.571	—	Lost NLCS (Phillies) 3–2	
1981^{[B]}	1981	MLB	NL	West	3rd	28	29	.491	8	Lost NLDS (Dodgers) 3–2	
1981^{[B]}	1981	MLB	NL	West	1st ^	33	20	.623	—	Lost NLDS (Dodgers) 3–2	
1982	1982	MLB	NL	West	5th	77	85	.475	12		
1983	1983	MLB	NL	West	3rd	85	77	.525	6		José Cruz (Silver Slugger)
1984	1984	MLB	NL	West	T-2nd	80	82	.494	12		José Cruz (Silver Slugger)
1985	1985	MLB	NL	West	T-3rd	83	79	.512	12		
1986	1986	MLB	NL	West ^	1st	96	66	.593	—	Lost NLCS (Mets) 4–2	Mike Scott (CYA, NLCS MVP); Hal Lanier (MOY); Glenn Davis (Silver Slugger)
1987	1987	MLB	NL	West	3rd	76	86	.469	14		
1988	1988	MLB	NL	West	5th	82	80	.506	12½		
1989	1989	MLB	NL	West	3rd	86	76	.531	6		Craig Biggio (Silver Slugger)
1990	1990	MLB	NL	West	T-4th	75	87	.463	16		
1991	1991	MLB	NL	West	6th	65	97	.401	29		Jeff Bagwell (ROY)
1992	1992	MLB	NL	West	4th	81	81	.500	17		
1993	1993	MLB	NL	West	3rd	85	77	.525	19		
1994	1994	MLB	NL	Central	2nd	66	49	.574	½	Playoffs cancelled^{[C]}	Jeff Bagwell (MVP, Silver Slugger, Gold Glove); Craig Biggio (Silver Slugger, Gold Glove)
1995^{[D]}	1995	MLB	NL	Central	2nd	76	68	.528	9		Craig Biggio (Silver Slugger, Gold Glove)
1996	1996	MLB	NL	Central	2nd	82	80	.506	6		Craig Biggio (Gold Glove)
1997	1997	MLB	NL	Central ^	1st	84	78	.519	—	Lost NLDS (Braves) 3–0	Craig Biggio (Silver Slugger, Gold Glove); Jeff Bagwell (Silver Slugger)
1998	1998	MLB	NL	Central ^	1st	102	60	.630	—	Lost NLDS (Padres) 3–1	Larry Dierker (MOY); Moisés Alou (Silver Slugger); Craig Biggio (Silver Slugger)
1999	1999	MLB	NL	Central ^	1st	97	65	.599	—	Lost NLDS (Braves) 3–1	Jeff Bagwell (Silver Slugger); Mike Hampton (Silver Slugger); Billy Wagner (Rolaids Relief Man)
2000	2000	MLB	NL	Central	4th	72	90	.444	23		
2001	2001	MLB	NL	Central ^	1st	93	69	.574	—	Lost NLDS (Braves) 3–0	Brad Ausmus (Gold Glove)
2002	2002	MLB	NL	Central	2nd	84	78	.519	13		Brad Ausmus (Gold Glove)
2003	2003	MLB	NL	Central	2nd	87	75	.537	1		
2004	2004	MLB	NL	Central	2nd ¤	92	70	.568	13	Won NLDS (Braves) 3–2; Lost NLCS (Cardinals) 4–3	Roger Clemens (CYA)
2005	2005	MLB	NL *	Central	2nd ¤	89	73	.549	11	Won NLDS (Braves) 3–1; Won NLCS (Cardinals) 4–2; Lost World Series (White Sox) 4–0 *	Roy Oswalt (NLCS MVP); Morgan Ensberg (Silver Slugger)
2006	2006	MLB	NL	Central	2nd	82	80	.506	1½		Brad Ausmus (Gold Glove)
2007	2007	MLB	NL	Central	4th	73	89	.451	12		Carlos Lee (Silver Slugger)
2008	2008	MLB	NL	Central	3rd	86	75	.534	11		
2009	2009	MLB	NL	Central	5th	74	88	.457	17		Michael Bourn (Gold Glove)
2010	2010	MLB	NL	Central	4th	76	86	.469	15		Michael Bourn (Gold Glove)
2011	2011	MLB	NL	Central	6th	56	106	.346	37½		
2012	2012	MLB	NL	Central	6th	55	107	.340	42		
2013	2013	MLB	AL	West	5th	51	111	.315	45		
2014	2014	MLB	AL	West	4th	70	92	.432	28		Jose Altuve (Silver Slugger); Dallas Keuchel (Gold Glove)
2015	2015	MLB	AL	West	2nd ¤	86	76	.531	2	Won ALWC (Yankees); Lost ALDS (Royals) 3–2	Dallas Keuchel (CYA, Gold Glove); Carlos Correa (ROY); Jose Altuve (Silver Slugger)
2016	2016	MLB	AL	West	3rd	84	78	.519	11		Jose Altuve (Silver Slugger); Dallas Keuchel (Gold Glove)
2017	2017	MLB †	AL	West ^	1st	101	61	.623	—	Won ALDS (Red Sox) 3–1; Won ALCS (Yankees) 4–3; Won World Series (Dodgers) 4–3	Jose Altuve (MVP, Babe Ruth, Hank Aaron, Silver Slugger); George Springer (WS MVP); Justin Verlander (ALCS MVP, Babe Ruth)
2018	2018	MLB	AL	West	1st	103	59	.636	—	Won ALDS (Indians) 3–0; Lost ALCS (Red Sox) 4–1	Alex Bregman (ASG MVP); Jose Altuve (Silver Slugger); Dallas Keuchel (Gold Glove)
2019	2019	MLB	AL *	West ^	1st	107	55	.660	—	Won ALDS (Rays) 3–2; Won ALCS (Yankees) 4–2; Lost World Series (Nationals) 4–3 *	Justin Verlander (CYA); Yordan Alvarez (ROY); Jose Altuve (ALCS MVP); Alex Bregman (Silver Slugger); George Springer (Silver Slugger); Zack Greinke (Gold Glove)^{[E]}
2020	2020	MLB	AL	West	2nd ¤	29	31	.483	7	Won ALWC (Twins) 2–0; Won ALDS (Athletics) 3–1; Lost ALCS (Rays) 4–3	
2021	2021	MLB	AL *	West ^	1st	95	67	.586	—	Won ALDS (White Sox) 3–1; Won ALCS (Red Sox) 4–2; Lost World Series (Braves) 4–2 *	Yordan Alvarez (ALCS MVP); Carlos Correa (Platinum Glove, Gold Glove); Yuli Gurriel (Gold Glove)
2022	2022	MLB †	AL *	West ^	1st	106	56	.654	—	Won ALDS (Mariners) 3–0; Won ALCS (Yankees) 4–0; Won World Series (Phillies) 4–2	Justin Verlander (CYA, CPOY); Jeremy Peña (WS MVP, ALCS MVP, Babe Ruth, Gold Glove); Jose Altuve (Silver Slugger); Yordan Alvarez (Silver Slugger); Kyle Tucker (Gold Glove)
2023	2023	MLB	AL	West ^	1st	90	72	.556	—	Won ALDS (Twins) 3–1; Lost ALCS (Rangers) 4–3	Kyle Tucker (Silver Slugger); Mauricio Dubón (Gold Glove)
2024	2024	MLB	AL	West ^	1st	88	73	.547	—	Lost ALWC (Tigers) 2–0	Jose Altuve (Silver Slugger); Alex Bregman (Gold Glove)
2025	2025	MLB	AL	West	2nd	87	75	.537	3		Mauricio Dubón (Gold Glove)
2026	2026	MLB	AL	West ^	1st	81	81	.500	—	Lost ALWC (White Sox) 2–0	Yordan Alvarez (MVP, Hank Aaron, CPOY, Silver Slugger); Christian Walker (Gold Glove)
Totals						Wins	Losses	Win%			
Totals						5,177	5,121	.503	All-time regular season record (1962–2026)		
Totals						83	80	.509	All-time postseason record		
Totals						5,260	5,201	.503	All-time regular and postseason record		

^{A} The Astros finished the season tied for first place with the Los Angeles Dodgers. Houston defeated the Dodgers, 7–1, in a one-game playoff to clinch the division title.
^{B} The 1981 Major League Baseball strike caused the season to be split into two halves. The Astros earned a berth in an expanded postseason tournament by finishing in first place in their division in the second half of the season. The Los Angeles Dodgers had finished the first half in first place to earn the division's other playoff berth.
^{C} The 1994–95 Major League Baseball strike, which started on August 12, 1994, led to the cancellation of the playoffs and World Series.
^{D} The 1994–95 MLB strike lasted until April 2, 1995, causing the shortening of the 1995 season to 144 games.
^{E} In a rare occurrence, because he was traded mid-season, Zack Greinke technically won both his Gold Glove and DPOY Award in the NL, despite stats from the latter third of the season, which he spent with the Astros in the AL, also factoring into the awards. He also won a Silver Slugger; however, due to the designated hitter option, he had no offensive stats from the AL to factor into this award, so, unlike the others, it is not considered part of his Astros resume for the year.

== Record by decade ==
The following table describes the Astros' MLB win–loss record by decade.

Decade	Wins	Losses	Pct
1960s	555	739	.429
1970s	793	817	.493
1980s	819	750	.522
1990s	813	742	.523
2000s	832	787	.514
2010s	789	831	.487
2020s	495	374	.570
All-time	5,096	5,040	.503

These statistics are from Baseball-Reference.com's Houston Astros History & Encyclopedia, and are current through 2025.

== Postseason appearances ==
Year	Wild Card Game/Series		LDS		LCS		World Series	
1980	None (Won NL West)^{[A]}				Philadelphia Phillies	L (2–3)		
1981	None^{[B]}		Los Angeles Dodgers	L (2–3)				
1986	None (Won NL West)				New York Mets	L (2–4)		
1997	None (Won NL Central)		Atlanta Braves	L (0–3)				
1998	None (Won NL Central)		San Diego Padres	L (1–3)				
1999	None (Won NL Central)		Atlanta Braves	L (1–3)				
2001	None (Won NL Central)		Atlanta Braves	L (0–3)				
2004	None (Won NL Wild Card)		Atlanta Braves	W (3–2)	St. Louis Cardinals	L (3–4)		
2005	None (Won NL Wild Card)		Atlanta Braves	W (3–1)	St. Louis Cardinals	W (4–2)	Chicago White Sox	L (0–4)
2015	New York Yankees W		Kansas City Royals	L (2–3)				
2017	Bye (Won AL West)		Boston Red Sox	W (3–1)	New York Yankees	W (4–3)	Los Angeles Dodgers	W (4–3)
2018	Bye (Won AL West)		Cleveland Indians	W (3–0)	Boston Red Sox	L (1–4)		
2019	Bye (Won AL West)		Tampa Bay Rays	W (3–2)	New York Yankees	W (4–2)	Washington Nationals	L (3–4)
2020	Minnesota Twins	W (2–0)	Oakland Athletics	W (3–1)	Tampa Bay Rays	L (3–4)		
2021	Bye (Won AL West)		Chicago White Sox	W (3–1)	Boston Red Sox	W (4–2)	Atlanta Braves	L (2–4)
2022	Bye (Won AL West)		Seattle Mariners	W (3–0)	New York Yankees	W (4–0)	Philadelphia Phillies	W (4–2)
2023	Bye (Won AL West)		Minnesota Twins	W (3–1)	Texas Rangers	L (3–4)		
2024	Detroit Tigers	L (0–2)						
2026	Chicago White Sox	L (0–2)						

== Postseason record by year ==
The Astros have made the postseason nineteen times, with the first one being in the 1980 season. They are one of only eight teams (as of 2025) to have a winning postseason series record.

Year	Finish	Round	Opponent	Result		
1980	NL West Champions	NLCS	Philadelphia Phillies	Lost	2	3
1981	NL West Co-Champions	NLDS	Los Angeles Dodgers	Lost	2	3
1986	NL West Champions	NLCS	New York Mets	Lost	2	4
1997	NL Central Champions	NLDS	Atlanta Braves	Lost	0	3
1998	NL Central Champions	NLDS	San Diego Padres	Lost	1	3
1999	NL Central Champions	NLDS	Atlanta Braves	Lost	1	3
2001	NL Central Champions	NLDS	Atlanta Braves	Lost	0	3
2004	NL Wild Card Champions	NLDS	Atlanta Braves	Won	3	2
2004	NL Wild Card Champions	NLCS	St. Louis Cardinals	Lost	3	4
2005	National League Champions	NLDS	Atlanta Braves	Won	3	1
2005	National League Champions	NLCS	St Louis Cardinals	Won	4	2
2005	National League Champions	WS	Chicago White Sox	Lost	0	4
2015	AL Wild Card Champions	ALWC	New York Yankees	Won	1	0
2015	AL Wild Card Champions	ALDS	Kansas City Royals	Lost	2	3
2017	World Series Champions	ALDS	Boston Red Sox	Won	3	1
2017	World Series Champions	ALCS	New York Yankees	Won	4	3
2017	World Series Champions	WS	Los Angeles Dodgers	Won	4	3
2018	AL West Champions	ALDS	Cleveland Indians	Won	3	0
2018	AL West Champions	ALCS	Boston Red Sox	Lost	1	4
2019	American League Champions	ALDS	Tampa Bay Rays	Won	3	2
2019	American League Champions	ALCS	New York Yankees	Won	4	2
2019	American League Champions	WS	Washington Nationals	Lost	3	4
2020	American League West; 2nd Place	ALWC	Minnesota Twins	Won	2	0
2020	American League West; 2nd Place	ALDS	Oakland Athletics	Won	3	1
2020	American League West; 2nd Place	ALCS	Tampa Bay Rays	Lost	3	4
2021	American League Champions	ALDS	Chicago White Sox	Won	3	1
2021	American League Champions	ALCS	Boston Red Sox	Won	4	2
2021	American League Champions	WS	Atlanta Braves	Lost	2	4
2022	World Series Champions	ALDS	Seattle Mariners	Won	3	0
2022	World Series Champions	ALCS	New York Yankees	Won	4	0
2022	World Series Champions	WS	Philadelphia Phillies	Won	4	2
2023	AL West Champions	ALDS	Minnesota Twins	Won	3	1
2023	AL West Champions	ALCS	Texas Rangers	Lost	3	4
2024	AL West Champions	ALWC	Detroit Tigers	Lost	0	2
2026	AL West Champions	ALWC	Chicago White Sox	Lost	0	2
19	Totals			18–17	83	80
