= List of Houston Astros Opening Day starting pitchers =

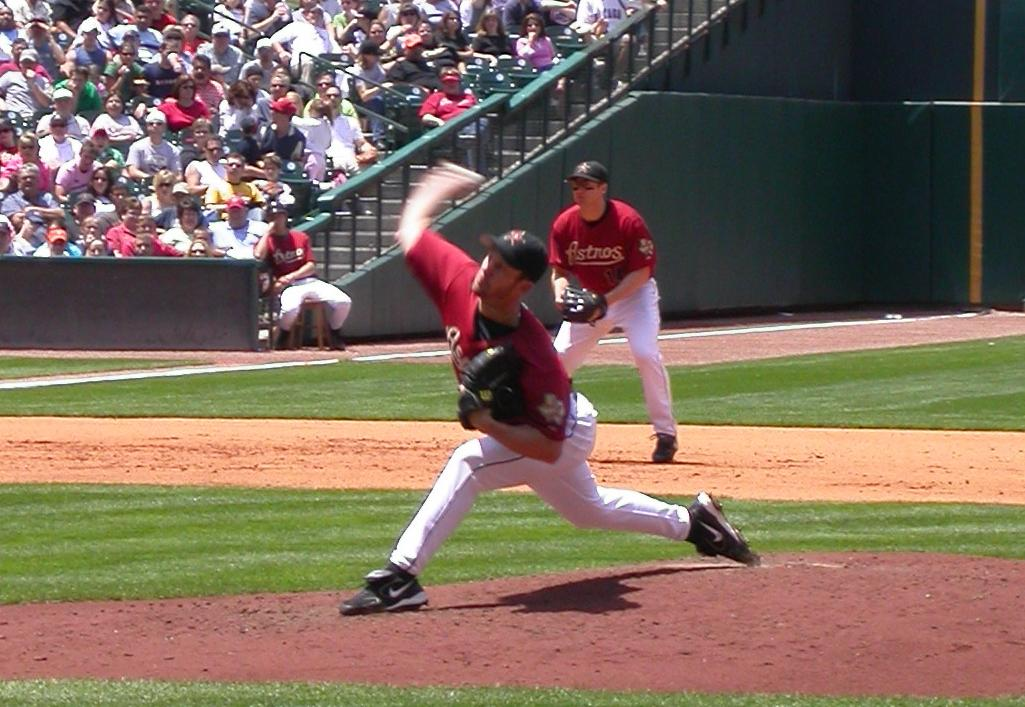
Roy Oswalt, the Houston Astros Opening Day starting pitcher for eight straight years, from 2003 through 2010.

The Houston Astros are a Major League Baseball (MLB) franchise based in Houston, Texas. They currently play in the American League West division. The first game of the new baseball season for a team is played on Opening Day, and being named the Opening Day starter is an honor, which is often given to the player who is expected to lead the pitching staff that season, though there are various strategic reasons why a team's best pitcher might not start on Opening Day.

The Astros began to play in 1962 as the Houston Colt .45s (their name was changed to the Astros in 1965 when the Houston Astrodome opened as their home ball park). Bobby Shantz started their first Opening Day game on April 10, 1962, against the Chicago Cubs at Houston's Colt Stadium and was credited with the win. In their first eight seasons, the Colt .45s / Astros used eight different Opening Day starters. In 1970, that streak ended when Larry Dierker made his second Opening Day start.

Roy Oswalt has made the most Opening Day starts for the Astros, with eight such starts from 2003 through 2010. Three different pitchers have each made five Opening Day starts for the Astros: J. R. Richard (1976–1980), Mike Scott (1987–1991) and Shane Reynolds (1996–2000). Dierker made four Opening Day starts for the Astros, and Joe Niekro and Hall of Famer Nolan Ryan made three apiece. Dierker has the best record in Opening Day starts with four wins and no losses. Niekro and Don Wilson share the worst record in Opening Day starts with no wins and two losses each. Niekro also had one no decision.

The Houston Astros have used 27 different Opening Day starting pitchers in their 61 seasons. The 27 starters have a combined Opening Day record of 30 wins, 21 losses and ten no decisions (which has resulted in a record of 33–28). No decisions are only awarded to the starting pitcher if the game is won or lost after the starting pitcher has left the game. The Astros have played in three home ball parks. Their first home ball park was Colt Stadium. Their starting pitchers had one win and one loss in their two Opening Day games at Colt Stadium. They played 25 Opening Day games in the Astrodome after moving there in 1965, and their starting pitchers had a record of twelve wins, eight losses and five no decisions in those games (going 14–11 overall). In 2000, they moved to Enron Field (subsequently renamed Astros Field and Minute Maid Park) in Downtown Houston. Through 2024, they have played seventeen Opening Day games there and have seen Astros starters go 8–4 with five no decisions (8–9 overall). This makes the record of the Astros' Opening Day starting pitchers in home games 21 wins, 13 losses and ten no decisions (23–21 overall). Their record in Opening Day away games is nine wins, eight losses and two no decisions (10–9 overall). The Astros have advanced to the World Series four times. In 2022, they set a modern Major League Baseball record by winning on Opening Day for the tenth straight season.

== Key ==
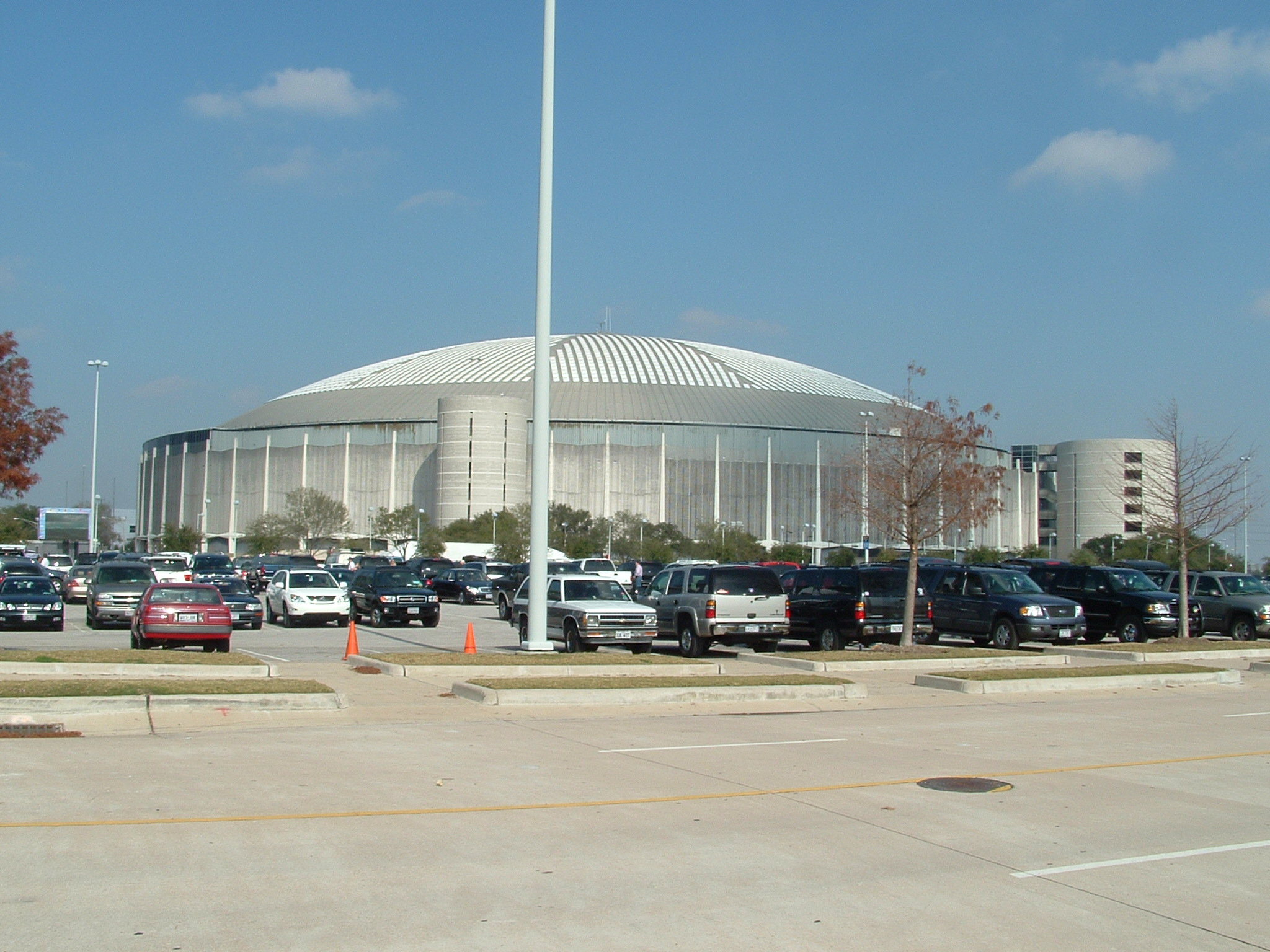
The Houston Astros played 25 Opening Day games in the Astrodome between 1965 and 1999.

Season	Each year is linked to an article about that particular Colt .45s / Astros season.
W	Win
L	Loss
ND (W)	No decision by starting pitcher; Astros won game
ND (L)	No decision by starting pitcher; Astros lost game
Final score	Game score with Colt .45s / Astros runs listed first
Location	Stadium in italics for home game
Pitcher (#)	Number of appearances as Opening Day starter with the Colt .45s / Astros
*	Advanced to the post-season
**	NL Champions
***	AL Champions
†	World Series Champions

== Pitchers ==
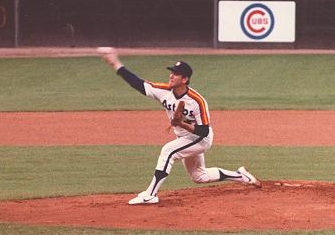
Nolan Ryan made three Opening Day starts for the Astros.

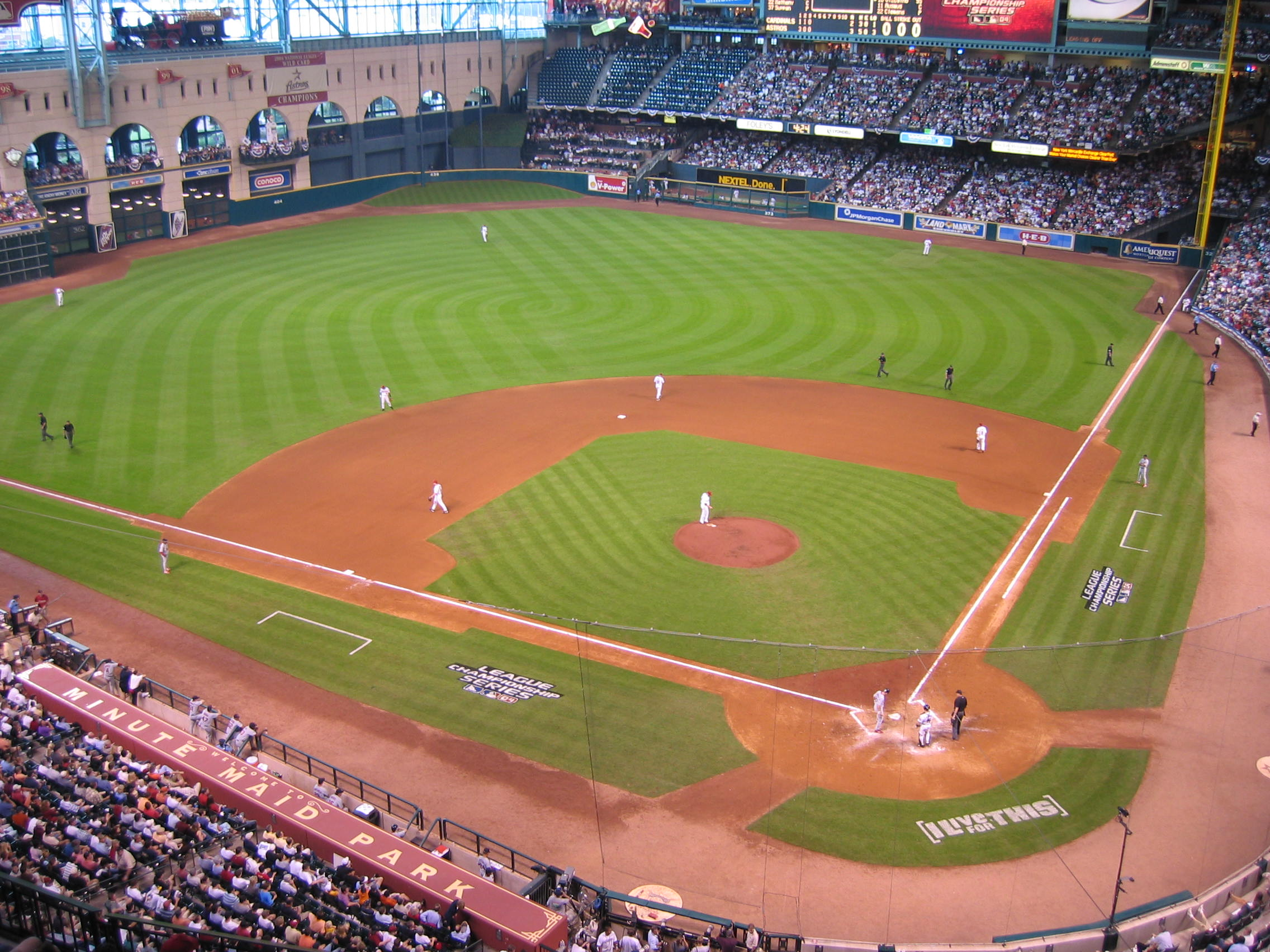
Minute Maid Park, previously called Enron Park and Astros Field, is the Astros' current home ball park, and the Astros have played seventeen Opening Day games there through 2024.

Season	Pitcher	Decision	Score	Opponent	Location	Box
1962	Bobby Shantz	W	11–2	Chicago Cubs	Colt Stadium	
1963	Turk Farrell	L	2–9	San Francisco Giants	Colt Stadium	
1964	Ken Johnson	W	6–3	Cincinnati Reds	Crosley Field	
1965	Bob Bruce	L	0–2	Philadelphia Phillies	Astrodome	
1966	Robin Roberts	L	2–3	Los Angeles Dodgers	Dodger Stadium	
1967	Mike Cuellar	W	6–1	Atlanta Braves	Astrodome	
1968	Larry Dierker	W	5–4	Pittsburgh Pirates	Astrodome	
1969	Don Wilson	L	1–2	San Diego Padres	San Diego Stadium	
1970	Larry Dierker (2)	W	8–5	San Francisco Giants	Candlestick Park	
1971	Larry Dierker (3)	W	5–2	Los Angeles Dodgers	Astrodome	
1972	Don Wilson (2)	L	0–5	San Francisco Giants	Astrodome	
1973	Dave Roberts	ND (W)	2–1	Atlanta Braves	Atlanta–Fulton County Stadium	
1974	Dave Roberts (2)	L	1–5	San Francisco Giants	Candlestick Park	
1975	Larry Dierker (4)	W	6–2	Atlanta Braves	Astrodome	
1976	J. R. Richard	L	5–11	Cincinnati Reds	Riverfront Stadium	
1977	J. R. Richard (2)	ND (W)	3–2	Atlanta Braves	Astrodome	
1978	J. R. Richard (3)	L	9–11	Cincinnati Reds	Riverfront Stadium	
1979	J. R. Richard (4)	W	2–1	Atlanta Braves	Astrodome	
1980*	J. R. Richard (5)	W	3–2	Los Angeles Dodgers	Astrodome	
1981*	Joe Niekro	L	0–2	Los Angeles Dodgers	Dodger Stadium	
1982	Nolan Ryan	L	3–14	St. Louis Cardinals	Astrodome	
1983	Joe Niekro (2)	ND (L)	7–16	Los Angeles Dodgers	Astrodome	
1984	Joe Niekro (3)	L	2–4	Montreal Expos	Astrodome	
1985	Nolan Ryan (2)	W	2–1	Los Angeles Dodgers	Astrodome	
1986*	Nolan Ryan (3)	L	3–8	San Francisco Giants	Astrodome	
1987	Mike Scott	W	4–3	Los Angeles Dodgers	Astrodome	
1988	Mike Scott (2)	W	6–3	San Diego Padres	Astrodome	
1989	Mike Scott (3)	W	10–3	Atlanta Braves	Astrodome	
1990	Mike Scott (4)	ND (L)	4–8	Cincinnati Reds	Astrodome	
1991	Mike Scott (5)	L	2–6	Cincinnati Reds	Riverfront Stadium	
1992	Pete Harnisch	L	0–2	Atlanta Braves	Astrodome	
1993	Doug Drabek	L	1–3	Philadelphia Phillies	Astrodome	
1994	Pete Harnisch (2)	ND (W)	6–5	Montreal Expos	Astrodome	
1995	Doug Drabek (2)	W	10–2	San Diego Padres	Jack Murphy Stadium	
1996	Shane Reynolds	L	3–4	Los Angeles Dodgers	Astrodome	
1997*	Shane Reynolds (2)	W	2–1	Atlanta Braves	Astrodome	
1998*	Shane Reynolds (3)	ND (L)	4–9	San Francisco Giants	Astrodome	
1999*	Shane Reynolds (4)	W	4–2	Chicago Cubs	Astrodome	
2000	Shane Reynolds (5)	W	5–2	Pittsburgh Pirates	Three Rivers Stadium	
2001*	Scott Elarton	W	11–3	Milwaukee Brewers	Enron Field	
2002	Wade Miller	L	3–9	Milwaukee Brewers	Astros Field	
2003	Roy Oswalt	W	10–4	Colorado Rockies	Minute Maid Park	
2004*	Roy Oswalt (2)	ND (L)	4–5	San Francisco Giants	Minute Maid Park	
2005**	Roy Oswalt (3)	L	3–7	St. Louis Cardinals	Minute Maid Park	
2006	Roy Oswalt (4)	W	1–0	Florida Marlins	Minute Maid Park	
2007	Roy Oswalt (5)	ND (L)	2–4	Pittsburgh Pirates	Minute Maid Park	
2008	Roy Oswalt (6)	L	0–4	San Diego Padres	Petco Park	
2009	Roy Oswalt (7)	L	2–4	Chicago Cubs	Minute Maid Park	
2010	Roy Oswalt (8)	L	2–5	San Francisco Giants	Minute Maid Park	
2011	Brett Myers	ND (L)	4–5	Philadelphia Phillies	Citizens Bank Park	
2012	Wandy Rodriguez	ND (L)	4–5	Colorado Rockies	Minute Maid Park	
2013	Bud Norris	W	8–2	Texas Rangers	Minute Maid Park	
2014	Scott Feldman	W	6–2	New York Yankees	Minute Maid Park	
2015*	Dallas Keuchel	W	2–0	Cleveland Indians	Minute Maid Park	
2016	Dallas Keuchel (2)	W	5–3	New York Yankees	Yankee Stadium	
2017†	Dallas Keuchel (3)	W	3–0	Seattle Mariners	Minute Maid Park	
2018*	Justin Verlander	W	4–1	Texas Rangers	Globe Life Park	
2019***	Justin Verlander (2)	W	5–1	Tampa Bay Rays	Tropicana Field	
2020*	Justin Verlander (3)	W	8–2	Seattle Mariners	Minute Maid Park	
2021***	Zack Greinke	W	8–1	Oakland Athletics	RingCentral Coliseum	
2022†	Framber Valdez	W	3–1	Los Angeles Angels	Angel Stadium	
2023*	Framber Valdez (2)	ND (L)	2–3	Chicago White Sox	Minute Maid Park	
2024*	Framber Valdez (3)	ND (L)	4–5	New York Yankees	Minute Maid Park	
2025	Framber Valdez (4)	W	3–1	New York Mets	Daikin Park	
2026*	Hunter Brown	ND (L)	0–3	Los Angeles Angels	Daikin Park	
