= Ron Cook (baseball) =

American baseball player (born 1947)

- Pitcher
- Born: July 11, 1947 (age 79); Jefferson, Texas, U.S.
- Batted: Left Threw: Left

MLB debut
- April 10, 1970, for the Houston Astros

Last MLB appearance
- September 16, 1971, for the Houston Astros

MLB statistics
- Win–loss record: 4–8
- Earned run average: 4.00
- Strikeouts: 60
- Stats at Baseball Reference

Teams
- Houston Astros (1970–1971)

Ronald Wayne Cook (born July 11, 1947) is an American former Major League Baseball pitcher who played for the Houston Astros in 1970 and 1971.

== Baseball career ==
Cook graduated from Longview High School. He was signed by the New York Yankees in 1966 as an amateur free agent and originally played the outfield before being converted to pitching in 1968.
