= Johnny Edwards (baseball) =

American baseball player (born 1938)

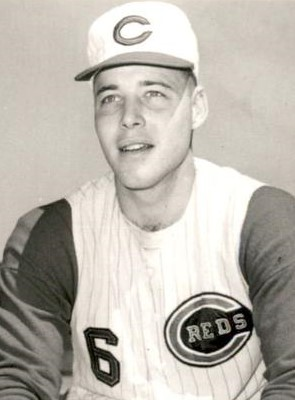
- Catcher
- Born: June 10, 1938 (age 88); Columbus, Ohio, U.S.
- Batted: Left Threw: Right

MLB debut
- June 27, 1961, for the Cincinnati Reds

Last MLB appearance
- October 2, 1974, for the Houston Astros

MLB statistics
- Batting average: .242
- Home runs: 81
- Runs batted in: 524
- Stats at Baseball Reference

Teams
- Cincinnati Reds (1961–1967); St. Louis Cardinals (1968); Houston Astros (1969–1974)

Career highlights and awards
- 3× All-Star (1963–1965); 2× Gold Glove Award (1963, 1964)

John Alban Edwards (born June 10, 1938) is an American former professional baseball player. He played as a catcher in Major League Baseball for the Cincinnati Reds (1961–67), St. Louis Cardinals (1968) and Houston Astros (1969–74). Known for his excellent defensive skills, Edwards was a three-time All-Star and a two-time National League Gold Glove Award winner. He batted left-handed, threw right-handed, and was listed as 6 feet 4 inches (1.93 m) tall and 220 pounds (100 kg).

== Playing career ==
Born in Columbus, Ohio, Edwards graduated from West High School and then Ohio State University, where he led the team in hits (24) in 1958 and was a member of Phi Kappa Tau fraternity. He was signed as an amateur free agent by the Cincinnati Reds in 1959.

Edwards made his MLB debut at age 23 on June 27, 1961, in a 10–8 Reds' win over the Chicago Cubs. In his first plate appearance, he pinch-hit in the seventh inning for Reds' starting catcher Jerry Zimmerman, drawing a walk against reliever Barney Schultz and later scoring on a triple by Jerry Lynch. In his next trip to the plate, in the ninth inning, he got his first hit and first RBI, driving in Gordy Coleman with a single against reliever Joe Schaffernoth.

During Edwards' rookie season, he backed up Zimmerman and helped the Reds win the 1961 National League pennant. In the 1961 World Series Edwards had 4 hits and 2 RBIs in a losing cause, as the New York Yankees defeated the Reds in 5 games.

Edwards put up solid offensive numbers from 1962 to 1965, earning three MLB All Star appearances. His offensive numbers diminished after he suffered a broken finger on the last day of spring training in 1966, but he continued to be one of the best defensive catchers in the National League. On June 14, 1965, Edwards was the Reds catcher when pitcher Jim Maloney went 10 innings against the New York Mets without allowing a hit. Edwards left the game in the 10th inning for a pinch runner with the game in a scoreless tie, as the Mets went on to break up the no-hitter and score a run to win the game in the 11th inning. Two months later, on August 19, 1965, Edwards was once again the catcher as Maloney threw another 10 innings without allowing a hit. This time, the Reds scored a run, securing the victory and the no-hitter for Maloney.

With the arrival of Johnny Bench, the Reds traded Edwards to the St. Louis Cardinals for Pat Corrales and Jimy Williams on February 8, 1968. With the Cardinals, he was the backup catcher to Tim McCarver, helping them win the National League pennant, however, they would subsequently lose to the Detroit Tigers in the 1968 World Series. Edwards caught Ray Washburn's no-hitter on September 18, 1968. One day after the World Series ended, Edwards was traded with minor leaguer Tommy Smith to the Houston Astros for Dave Giusti and Dave Adlesh on October 11. In his first season with the Houston Astros in 1969, Edwards finished 36th in voting for the National League Most Valuable Player Award.

His final game played, at age 36, was a 5–4 10-inning loss to the Los Angeles Dodgers at the Astrodome on October 2, 1974. In his final plate appearance, pinch-hitting in the 10th inning for Skip Jutze against the Dodgers' Eddie Solomon, Edwards drew a walk.

== Career statistics ==
In a 14-year major league career, Edwards played in 1,470 games, producing 1,106 hits in 4,577 at bats for a .242 batting average along with 81 home runs, 524 runs batted in, and a .311 on-base percentage. He was named to three consecutive National League (NL) All-Star teams, in 1963, 1964, and 1965. He ranked 102nd in MLB history in intentional walks, as of July 2025.

A solid defensive player, he had a career fielding percentage of .992 which was 4 points above the league average, helping him earn the NL Gold Glove Award for catchers in 1963 and 1964. He led NL catchers in fielding percentage four times, in 1963, 1969, 1970, and 1971. He also led the league four times in assists and three times in putouts. In 1969, Edwards set single-season records for catchers with 1,135 putouts and 1,221 total chances. That season, Astros pitchers set a major league record for strikeouts, which lasted until 1996. Edwards' putout record was passed in 2019, and both season-season records were set by J.T. Realmuto in 2023.

Richard Kendall of the Society for American Baseball Research devised a study that ranked Edwards as the second most dominating fielding catcher in major league history. He caught 109 shutouts during his career, ranking him 22nd all-time among major league catchers, as of 2010.

== Personal life ==
Edwards earned a degree in engineering from Ohio State. During his offseasons while with the Reds, he worked as a research engineer for General Electric's nuclear meaterials operation. His family relocated to Houston after he was traded to the Astros. After retiring from baseball, he worked in Houston for Cameron Ironworks then CTC International, which later merged with Baker Hughes. Edwards retired in 2002. He is married and has two children.

Edwards was inducted into the Ohio State Varsity O Hall of Fame in September 2008.
