= Skip Guinn =

American baseball player

- Pitcher
- Born: October 25, 1944 (age 81); St. Charles, Missouri, U.S.
- Batted: Right Threw: Left

MLB debut
- May 7, 1968, for the Atlanta Braves

Last MLB appearance
- September 24, 1971, for the Houston Astros

MLB statistics
- Win–loss record: 1–2
- Earned run average: 5.40
- Strikeouts: 40
- Stats at Baseball Reference

Teams
- Atlanta Braves (1968); Houston Astros (1969, 1971)

Drannon Eugene "Skip" Guinn (born October 25, 1944) is an American former Major League Baseball pitcher. He was signed as an undrafted free agent by the Milwaukee Braves in 1964. He played for the Atlanta Braves and the Houston Astros, from 1968 to 1971.

== Early life ==
Guinn was born in St. Charles, Missouri. He graduated from Venice High School in Los Angeles and attended Santa Monica College. He was signed as an undrafted free agent by the Milwaukee Brewers in 1964.

== Baseball career ==
In 1965 pitching for in the Florida State League he was 8-7 with a 2.45 ERA, with 140 strikeouts in 120 innings, had 10.1 strikeouts per nine innings (5th), and gave up 5.6 hits per nine innings (9th). In 1966, he pitched for the Kinston Eagles in the Carolina League, and was 10-10 with a 3.94 earned run average (ERA), and had four shutouts (2nd in the league), 171 strikeouts (4th) in 169 innings, and 9.1 strikeouts per nine innings (10th in the league).

He made his major league debut in 1968, at 23 years of age. He played parts of three seasons in the majors, between 1968 and 1971. He played for the Atlanta Braves and was traded to the Houston Astros in April 1969 after first baseman Donn Clendenon refused to report to Houston.

In his major league career, he was 1-2 with one save and a 5.44 ERA in 35 relief appearances covering 36.2 innings in which he struck out 40 batters and averaged 9.8 strikeouts per 9 innings.

== Personal life ==
Guinn's grandson, Kyle Harrison, is also a left-handed professional major league baseball pitcher.

== Sources ==
- Career statistics from Baseball Reference · Baseball Reference (Minors) · Retrosheet · Baseball Almanac
