= Marty Martínez =

Cuban baseball player, coach, manager, and scout (1941–2007)

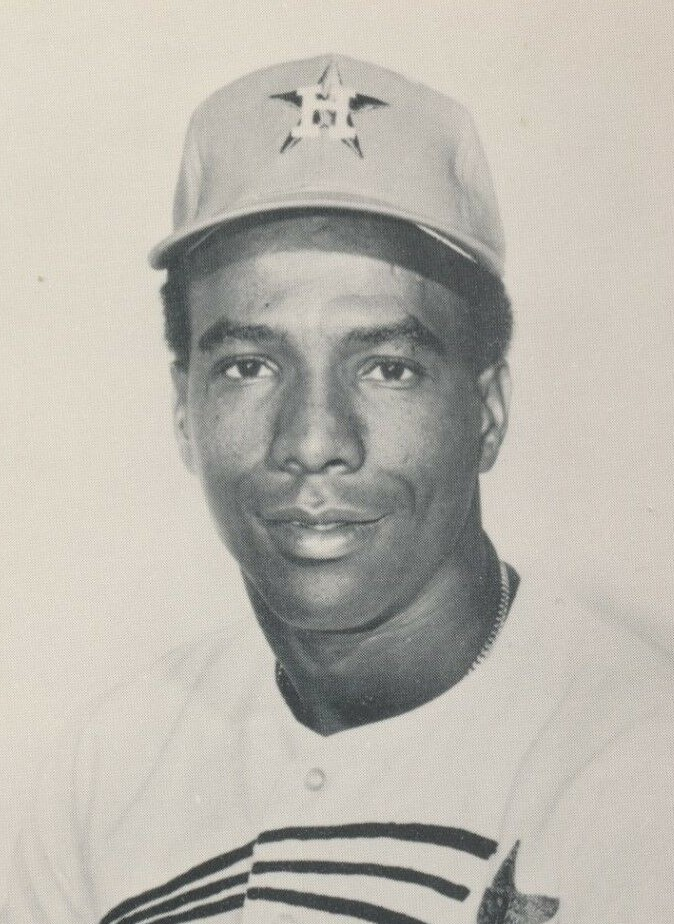
- Utility player / Manager
- Born: August 23, 1941; Havana, Cuba
- Died: March 8, 2007 (aged 65); Santo Domingo, Dominican Republic
- Batted: Both Threw: Right

MLB debut
- May 2, 1962, for the Minnesota Twins

Last MLB appearance
- October 4, 1972, for the Texas Rangers

MLB statistics
- Batting average: .243
- Home runs: 0
- Runs batted in: 57
- Stats at Baseball Reference
- Managerial record at Baseball Reference

Teams
- Minnesota Twins (1962); Atlanta Braves (1967–1968); Houston Astros (1969–1971); St. Louis Cardinals (1972); Oakland Athletics (1972); Texas Rangers (1972)

Orlando Martínez Oliva (August 23, 1941 – March 8, 2007) was a Cuban utility player, manager, coach and scout in Major League Baseball. Listed at 6' 0" [1.83 m], 170 lb. [77 k], Martínez was a switch-hitter and threw right-handed.

Born in Havana, Cuba, Martínez was nicknamed Marty by fans and teammates. He never hit a home run in 945 major-league career at-bats, but did everything a player was asked to do. Martínez appeared at shortstop in 157 games, and also played at first (5), second (59), and third bases (74); caught (30), and made a relief appearance. Nevertheless, he is best remembered as the man who scouted and signed Edgar Martínez and Omar Vizquel, among other distinguished players.

Signed by the Washington Senators as an amateur free agent in 1960, Martínez reached the majors in 1962 with the Minnesota Twins, spending one year with them before moving to the Atlanta Braves (1967–1968), Houston Astros (1969–1971), St. Louis Cardinals (1972), Oakland Athletics (1972) and Texas Rangers (1972). In 1968 with Atlanta, he appeared in a career-high 113 games. In 1969, he hit a career-high .308 in 78 games for Houston as a backup catcher for Johnny Edwards and also played six different positions.

In all or part of seven seasons, Martínez was a .243 hitter with 57 RBI and 97 runs in 436 games, including 230 hits, 19 doubles, 11 triples and seven stolen bases.

Following his major league career, Martínez played and managed for the Tulsa Drillers, Texas Rangers Double-A affiliate. He managed the Drillers in 1977 and 1978 and led the team to a Texas League first-half title in 1977. After that, he spent more than a decade in the Seattle Mariners organization as a coach on the staffs of Del Crandall, Chuck Cottier and Bill Plummer (1983–86; 1992), serving as the Mariners interim manager in the 1986 season. As a Mariners instructor, he nurtured and molded a whole generations of Seattle infielders, including the aforementioned Vizquel and Martínez, as well as Harold Reynolds and Spike Owen. He also managed Kola Román de Montería in the 1984–85 Colombian Professional Baseball League season.

He died of a heart attack at the age of 65.
