= Norm Miller (baseball) =

American baseball player (born 1946)

- Right fielder
- Born: February 5, 1946 (age 80); Los Angeles, California, U.S.
- Batted: Left Threw: Right

MLB debut
- September 11, 1965, for the Houston Astros

Last MLB appearance
- September 28, 1974, for the Atlanta Braves

MLB statistics
- Batting average: .238
- Home runs: 24
- Runs batted in: 159
- Stats at Baseball Reference

Teams
- Houston Astros (1965–1973); Atlanta Braves (1973–1974)

Norman Calvin Miller (born February 5, 1946) is an American former professional baseball player who played outfield in the Major Leagues from 1965 to 1974 for the Houston Astros and Atlanta Braves. Later in his career he served in the Astros' front office.

== Biography ==
Miller was born in Los Angeles, California, attended Van Nuys High School (class of 1964) in Van Nuys, California, and is Jewish. He batted left-handed, threw right-handed, stood 5 feet 10 inches (1.78 m) tall and weighed 185 pounds (84 kg).

Originally signed out of high school by the Los Angeles Angels as a second baseman, at 18 years of age he batted .301/.446 (5th in the league)/.525 (8th) for the Quad City Angels in the Midwest League in 1964, and was selected by the Houston Astros in the 1964 Rule 5 draft, after which he switched to the outfield. He began 1965 batting .289/.406 (7th in the league)/.492 (7th) with 89 walks (leading the league), 84 runs (5th), 20 home runs (4th), and 92 RBIs (3rd) for the Amarillo Sonics in the Texas League.

When he made his major league debut in 1965, he was the sixth-youngest player in the National League. His career was curtailed by a back injury, and he retired at the age of 28. Miller appeared in 540 games and notched 325 hits as a Major Leaguer.

Miller scored the winning run in the famous 1968 1-0 24-inning game between the Astros and New York Mets, when Bob Aspromonte's bases-loaded ground ball went through the legs of Met shortstop Al Weis for an error. He was traded from the Astros to the Braves for Cecil Upshaw on April 22, 1973.

In 2004, Miller opened Camp Hardball, a baseball school.

In 2009, Miller published a memoir entitled To All My Fans From 'Norm Who'?. Miller serves as a sports radio host on Saturdays on KILT-AM. Episodes from Miller's 1969 season with the Astros were also chronicled in another memoir, the renowned 1970 best-seller Ball Four, penned by his teammate, one-time roommate and friend Jim Bouton. Miller, Bouton, reports, once suddenly announced that he was not going to play baseball on Jewish holidays, which surprised his teammates because he was never known to be religiously observant. The reason, Miller said, was "I play on a Jewish holiday and go 0 for 5...and the next day I go 0 for 4 and that is it. I'll never play on Jewish holidays again."

In 2014 he was inducted into the Southern California Jewish Sports Hall of Fame.
