= Don Bryant (baseball) =

American baseball player (1941–2015)

- Catcher
- Born: July 13, 1941; Jasper, Florida, U.S.
- Died: January 22, 2015 (aged 73); Gainesville, Florida, U.S.
- Batted: Right Threw: Right

MLB debut
- July 17, 1966, for the Chicago Cubs

Last MLB appearance
- July 29, 1970, for the Houston Astros

MLB statistics
- Batting average: .220
- Home runs: 1
- Hits: 24
- Stats at Baseball Reference

Teams
- Chicago Cubs (1966); Houston Astros (1969–1970)

Donald Ray Bryant (July 13, 1941 – January 22, 2015) was an American catcher and coach in Major League Baseball. He was nicknamed "Bear" by baseball teammates in homage to University of Alabama football coach Paul "Bear" Bryant. Born in Jasper, Florida, he attended high school at the Paxon School for Advanced Studies in Jacksonville. Bryant threw and batted right-handed, stood 6 feet 5 inches (1.96 m) tall and weighed 200 pounds (91 kg).

== Career ==
Bryant's 14-year professional playing career, which included 892 games played in the minor leagues and 59 games at the MLB level, began in the Detroit Tigers' organization in 1960. He spent six seasons there until late 1965, when he was purchased by the Chicago Cubs. He began his MLB career with the Cubs in 1966, then later played for the 1969–70 Houston Astros. In the Majors, Bryant batted .220 with 24 hits, one home run and 13 runs batted in, and caught Don Wilson's second career no-hitter on May 1, 1969, against the Cincinnati Reds. Bryant's only big-league home run, a two-run blast, came two days later off Bobby Bolin of the San Francisco Giants, the winning blow in an eventual 4–3 Houston victory.

Bryant was acquired by the Boston Red Sox in December 1970 and became a playing coach for their Triple-A affiliate, the Pawtucket Red Sox, in 1973. The following year, Pawtucket manager Darrell Johnson was promoted to Boston as field boss, and brought Bryant with him as bullpen coach. Bryant coached under Johnson in Boston (1974–76) — serving on the 1975 American League championship team — and with the Seattle Mariners (1977–80) before leaving the game.

Preceded by Doug Camilli	Boston Red Sox Bullpen Coach; 1974–1976	Succeeded by Walt Hriniak
Preceded by Franchise established	Seattle Mariners Bullpen Coach; 1977–1980	Succeeded by Frank Funk
