= Dick Bogard =

John Richard Bogard, Jr. (February 10, 1937 - August 29, 2003) was a minor league baseball player, manager and a long time scout.

== Playing career ==
Bogard spent six years as a player, playing from 1957 to 1962. In 703 minor league games, he had a .287 batting average, with 677 hits in 2,362 at-bats.

== Managing career ==
He managed the Williamsport Astros to a playoff appearance in 1968, however the team lost in the first round. In 1969, he led the Covington Astros to a losing record, and in 1970 he led the Williamsport Astros to a losing record.

== Scouting and executive career ==
From 1963 to 1972, he scouted for the Houston Astros, except for the years in which he managed. He scouted for the Milwaukee Brewers until 1977 and was a national crosschecker for the Major League Scouting Bureau.

He next took a job as the Scouting Director for the Oakland Athletics from 1984 to 1994. From 1995 to 1996, Bogard was a Special Assistant to the GM for the Athletics.

In January, 2003, he was named special assistant for scouting operations and Mel Didier special assignment professional scout. He died in August of that year.
