= Curt Blefary =

American baseball player (1943–2001)

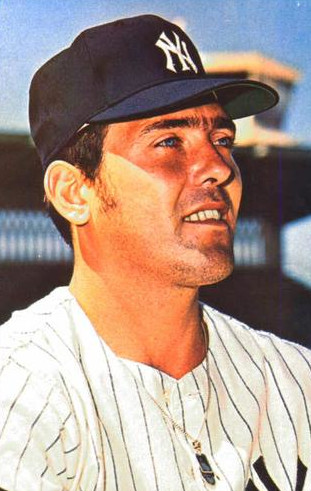
- Blefary in 1970
- Outfielder / First baseman
- Born: July 5, 1943; Brooklyn, New York, U.S.
- Died: January 28, 2001 (aged 57); Pompano Beach, Florida, U.S.
- Batted: Left Threw: Right

MLB debut
- April 14, 1965, for the Baltimore Orioles

Last MLB appearance
- October 4, 1972, for the San Diego Padres

MLB statistics
- Batting average: .237
- Home runs: 112
- Runs batted in: 382
- Stats at Baseball Reference

Teams
- Baltimore Orioles (1965–1968); Houston Astros (1969); New York Yankees (1970–1971); Oakland Athletics (1971–1972); San Diego Padres (1972)

Career highlights and awards
- World Series champion (1966); AL Rookie of the Year (1965)

Curtis Leroy "Clank" Blefary (July 5, 1943 – January 28, 2001) was an American professional baseball left fielder who played in Major League Baseball (MLB) for the Baltimore Orioles (1965–1968), Houston Astros (1969), New York Yankees (1970–1971), Oakland Athletics (1971–1972) and the San Diego Padres (1972). A native of Brooklyn, New York, he batted left-handed and threw right-handed.

He was the 1965 Rookie of the Year. In 1969, he and teammate Don Wilson became the first interracial roommates in National League history.

== Early life ==
Blefary was born on July 5, 1943, in Brooklyn, New York. He grew up in Mahwah, New Jersey and attended Mahwah High School. He was a three-sport star (baseball, basketball and football), and received All-State baseball honors in 1960. He was captain of the school's baseball team as a senior. As a senior, he switched from playing third base to playing catcher.

== Baseball career ==
Artie Dede, the five boroughs of New York City scout for the New York Yankees, looked at Blefary while visiting the Wagner College freshman team in 1962. Blefary had just won the Most Valuable Player award at Wagner during the 1962 season, hitting .338 in 17 games and led the Metropolitan Conference in fielding percentage. Having just moved to New Shrewsbury, New Jersey, Blefary started playing with the Jersey Shore Baseball League's Old Union House team. On June 18, 1962, Dede and John H. Johnson, the farm director, came to Blefary's house in New Shrewsbury and signed him to his first professional contract. The bonus involved was the highest the Yankees had given any player in the 1962 season.

=== Minor leagues ===
In 1962, he was assigned to the Yankees Class-B team in Greensboro and played there in 1962-63, but the Yankees waived him in April 1963, and the Orioles claimed him. He played in the Orioles minor league system in 1963-64. He had his first professional experience playing catcher for the 1963 Elmira Pioneers, under future Orioles manager Earl Weaver. In 1964, with the Triple-A Rochester Red Wings, he had a .287 batting average, with 31 home runs, 80 runs batted in (RBI), 87 runs scored, a .924 on-base plus slugging (OPS), and 102 bases on balls.

=== Baltimore Orioles ===
In his debut year with the Orioles in 1965, Blefary hit .260 with 22 home runs and 70 RBIs, winning both the American League Rookie of the Year and The Sporting News Rookie of the Year awards.

During the 1965 Winter Meetings, he was one of three players along with Milt Pappas and Jack Baldschun whose names were originally submitted by the Cincinnati Reds in discussions of any transaction which would have sent Frank Robinson to Baltimore, but the Orioles balked at trading Blefary. Dick Simpson was sent to the Reds instead of Blefary to complete the deal. The following season, he was a member of the Orioles team that won the 1966 World Series. Blefary principally played left field (and 20 games at first base), hitting .255, with 23 home runs, 64 RBIs, 73 runs and an .839 OPS.

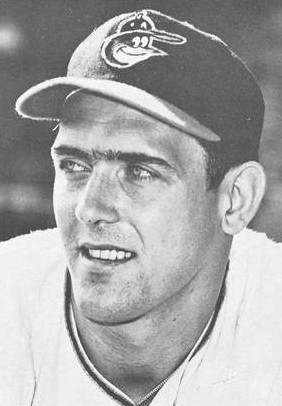
Blefary in 1967

Nicknamed "Clank" by Frank Robinson because of his below-average fielding abilities, Blefary started his career in the outfield, tried at first base, then switched to catcher, in an effort to keep his bat in the lineup. In 1967, he played over 100 games in the outfield (both right and left field) and over 50 games at first base. Blefary hit .242, with 22 home runs and 81 RBIs. On June 6, 1967, Blefary hit three home runs in a game against the California Angels, with 7 RBIs.

In 1968, Blefary not only played the outfield and first base, but played 40 games at catcher, being moved to catcher by Orioles manager Hank Bauer. On April 27, 1968, he caught Tom Phoebus's no-hitter against the Red Sox. His batting average fell to .200 for the 1968 season, however, and he hit only 15 home runs with 39 RBIs in 451 at bats. Earl Weaver replaced Bauer as Orioles' manager in 1968, and considered Blefary's ability to play different positions valuable, even if his hitting declined for this one year. Blaming his constant defensive shuffling for his offensive decline, Blefary was traded to Houston in December 1968, in the deal that brought Mike Cuellar to the Orioles. Blefary said at the time that Weaver never appreciated his efforts, and was not surprised to be traded.

=== Houston Astros, New York Yankees, San Diego Padres ===
Blefary was the Astros starting first baseman in 1969. He hit .253, with 12 home runs, 67 RBIs, 66 runs and 77 walks. On May 4, 1969, Blefary, who was playing first base participated in all of the Astros record-tying seven double plays in a game against the San Francisco Giants. In 1969 with the Astros, Blefary and teammate Don Wilson became the first interracial roommates in National League history.

After a full season with the Astros, at the end of the 1969 season he was traded to the Yankees for fellow Brooklynite, Joe Pepitone. Blefary was used as a part-time player by the Yankees. He played in 99 games, batting .212 in 269 at bats with only nine home runs. He was dealt from the Yankees to the Oakland Athletics for Rob Gardner and Darrell Osteen on May 25, 1971. He was sent to the Padres in 1972. He played sparingly in his last two seasons, with little offensive production.

In an eight-season career, Blefary was a .237 hitter with 112 home runs and 382 RBIs in 974 games.

== Personal life ==
After retiring in 1972, he tried unsuccessfully to continue his career in baseball as a coach. He worked as a sheriff, bartender, truck driver, and later owned a night club.

He played and coached in the 1977 season with the New Jersey Statesmen, a professional softball team in the American Professional Slo-Pitch League (APSPL), as did fellow MLB alumnus Joe Pepitone. Blefary managed the team in 1978 but was fired mid-season.

Even as his health failed in his later years, he hoped to secure a professional coaching job, but his only connection with baseball was as a volunteer coach for Northeast High School in Fort Lauderdale.

Blefary's grandson, Anthony Servideo, was drafted in the third round of the 2020 Major League Baseball Draft by the Orioles. Servideo is a shortstop and played college baseball at the University of Mississippi.

== Alcoholism, later life and death ==
Blefary started drinking at age 18, and continued drinking hard liquor for 33 years, which he acknowledged harmed his career. Former major league pitcher Sam McDowell helped Blefary find his way to rehabilitation.

In the last years of his life, Blefary suffered from chronic pancreatitis. He had hip replacement surgery due to avascular necrosis in the mid-1990s and experienced a variety of health and financial problems, including alcoholism and depression.

Blefary died at his home in Pompano Beach, Florida on January 28, 2001, at the age of 57 from chronic pancreatitis and other related ailments. His last wish was to be buried in Baltimore's Memorial Stadium. Although the park was nearly demolished when he died, his wife Lana was able to honor his request to scatter his ashes in Memorial Stadium. The Babe Ruth Museum supplied the home plate used in the penultimate game at the stadium and located it in the precise spot where it had been used. The ceremony was held on May 24, 2001. "He loved Baltimore, and he loved his fans," said his wife. "He was a lifelong student of the game."
