= Denny Lemaster =

American baseball player (1939–2024)

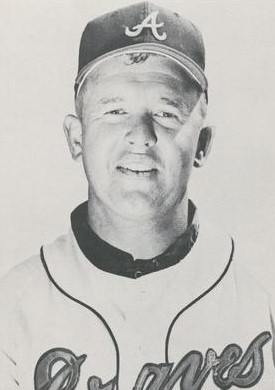
- Pitcher
- Born: February 25, 1939; Corona, California, U.S.
- Died: July 24, 2024 (aged 85); Loganville, Georgia, U.S.
- Batted: Right Threw: Left

MLB debut
- July 15, 1962, for the Milwaukee Braves

Last MLB appearance
- June 21, 1972, for the Montreal Expos

MLB statistics
- Win–loss record: 90–105
- Earned run average: 3.58
- Strikeouts: 1,305
- Stats at Baseball Reference

Teams
- Milwaukee / Atlanta Braves (1962–1967); Houston Astros (1968–1971); Montreal Expos (1972)

Career highlights and awards
- All-Star (1967)

Denver Clayton Lemaster (February 25, 1939 – July 24, 2024) was an American professional baseball player and left-handed pitcher who appeared in 357 games over 11 seasons (1962–1972) for the Milwaukee / Atlanta Braves, Houston Astros and Montreal Expos. A one-time (1967) National League All-Star, Lemaster won 90 games over the course of his MLB career. He was listed as 6 feet 1 inch (1.85 m) tall and 182 pounds (83 kg).

== Early life ==
Lemaster was born in Corona, California, on February 25, 1939. His Missouri born father, Cyrus Lemaster, moved his family to Missouri, but returned to Ventura County, California for work on a dairy farm when Lemaster and his sister were young children. The farm also housed the Lemasters. In a tragic incident, while Lemaster was playing with his sister on dairy owned property, the ground gave way under his sister, swallowing her in a muck from which she could not escape, and help could not reach her before she died. Three years later, Cyrus would die in a car accident. The local community rallied to support Lemaster and his mother. Two decades later, his first wife Earlene was also killed in a car accident.

At 14, he joined a semi-pro baseball team, the Camarillo Blue Sox, which included adult players. Before he was 16, he was pitching for the Blue Sox.

Lemaster attended Oxnard High School in Oxnard, California. One of his high school teammates was future major league third baseman Ken McMullen. During high school, Lemaster threw seven no-hitters, one perfect game, and had a 0.14 ERA during his senior year in 1958. He was All-County from 1956-1958, and All-California Interscholastic Federation (CIF) from 1956-1958, CIF Player of the Year in 1958, and was selected Oxnard High's Player of the Year and Most Outstanding athlete in 1958.

Lemaster has been inducted into the Ventura County Sports Hall of Fame.

== Career ==
He was pursued by major league baseball scouts upon graduating in 1958. The 19-year old Lemaster leveraged a scholarship offer from the University of Southern California in negotiations with the professional baseball scouts, and ultimately received an $80,000 bonus to sign with the Milwaukee Braves.

=== Minor league ===
Lemaster was in the Braves minor league system from 1958 to 1962. In 1962, he began the year with the Louisville Colonels of the Triple-A American Association, and had a win-loss record of 10-4 with a 2.40 ERA and 125 strikeouts in 124 innings, before being called up to the Braves that year.

=== Major league ===
After rising through the team's farm system over through 41/2 years, he made his major league debut as the Braves' starting pitcher on July 15, 1962, against the defending league champion Cincinnati Reds at Milwaukee County Stadium. He held a 2–1 lead going into the ninth inning, but a Vada Pinson home run, followed by an unearned run, saddled him with a 3–2, complete game defeat. He appeared in 17 games for the Braves in 1962, starting 12, with a 3-4 record and 3.01 ERA. He threw four complete games, one shutout and struck out 69 batters in 86.2 innings.

In 1963, Lemaster became a regular member of the Braves' starting rotation, and exceeded 200 innings pitched three times in the next five seasons, moving with the Braves from Milwaukee to Atlanta. He won 17 games in 1964 (losing 11), threw two one-hitters (in 1964 and 1967), and set a team record of 14 strikeouts in one 1966 game. (In 2022, Spencer Strider set the team record with 16 strikeouts in a game.) He was selected to the 1967 NL All-Star Team during his final season with the club. He did not appear in the game, played at Anaheim Stadium on July 11 and won by the National League 2–1 in 15 innings.

After the 1967 season, Lemaster was traded with Denis Menke to the Houston Astros in exchange for infielders Sonny Jackson and Chuck Harrison. He again exceeded 200 innings pitched in his first two seasons in Houston and posted a solid 3.00 composite earned run average, but won only 23 of 55 decisions. He became a bullpen specialist during his final two seasons in Houston and a partial season with the Montreal Expos before retiring. He had 32 and 37 starts in 1968 and 1969 with the Astros, but started only 21 of the 39 games he appeared in the following year. In 1971, he appeared in 42 games without any starts. In his final season, with Montreal, he appeared in 13 games with no starts. The Expos released him on July 1, 1972.

All told, Lemaster posted a 90–105 win–loss record and a 3.58 career earned run average during his MLB tenure. In 249 games started, he registered 66 complete games and 14 shutouts, adding eight saves as a relief pitcher. In 1,7822/3 innings pitched, he allowed 1,703 hits and 600 bases on balls with 1,305 strikeouts. In 1964, 1966, 1967 and 1969, he led the league in fielding percentage.

== Personal life and death ==
After retirement Lemaster spent over 30 years in the homebuilding business. He also became a hunting and fishing guide, and developed a mastery in carving and painting wooden decoy ducks. He remarried after the death of his first wife. Lemaster died on July 24, 2024, at the age of 85. At the time of his death he had four children, three stepchildren, 14 grandchildren and 12 great-grandchildren.
