= Scipio Spinks =

American baseball player (born 1947)

- Pitcher
- Born: July 12, 1947 (age 79); Chicago, Illinois, U.S.
- Batted: Right Threw: Right

MLB debut
- September 16, 1969, for the Houston Astros

Last MLB appearance
- June 9, 1973, for the St. Louis Cardinals

MLB statistics
- Win–loss record: 7–11
- Earned run average: 3.70
- Strikeouts: 154
- Stats at Baseball Reference

Teams
- Houston Astros (1969–1971); St. Louis Cardinals (1972–1973)

Scipio Ronald Spinks (born July 12, 1947) is an American former right handed pitcher in Major League Baseball who played from 1969 through 1973 for the Houston Astros and St. Louis Cardinals.

== Life and sports ==
Born in Chicago, Illinois, Spinks was a promising prospect until injuries prematurely ended his career. Spinks graduated from Harlan High School in Chicago and was drafted by the Astros organization in 1966. That August, he set a record in the Northern League by striking out 20 batters in a game. In 1968, he went 9–6 with a 2.27 earned run average in the Carolina League. He was shuttled between Class AAA and the major league club for the next few seasons. The hard-throwing Spinks had control problems but also struck out an average of one batter per inning in the American Association.

Spinks was traded along with Lance Clemons from the Astros to the Cardinals for Jerry Reuss on April 15, 1972. He started the season with the major league club and pitched well. By midseason, he was third in the National League in strikeouts, behind only Steve Carlton and Tom Seaver. Spinks finished with a 2.67 ERA.

Spinks was exceptionally fast for a pitcher, and for that reason the Cardinals frequently used him as a pinch runner. Spinks' career was drastically altered on July 4, 1972. While scoring from first on a double, he ran into Cincinnati Reds catcher Johnny Bench in a collision at home plate. While Spinks scored, he tore ligaments in his right knee during the collision, and missed the rest of the season. In 1973, he pitched just eight games before coming down with a shoulder injury. Just before spring training 1974, Spinks was traded to the Chicago Cubs for Jim Hickman. He spent the next three years in the Cubs, New York Yankees and Astros organizations, but never recovered and finally retired in 1976. Meanwhile, Reuss would go on to pitch for another 18 years.

== Post MLB career ==
After his playing career ended, Spinks became a scout and a pitching coach in the San Diego Padres and Houston Astros organizations. He currently lives in the Houston area with his wife and as of 2016 is a pro scout for the Arizona Diamondbacks' organization. He is currently the head coach for the University of Houston-Downtown Gators baseball organization.
