= Keith Lampard =

English baseball player (1945–2020)

- Outfielder
- Born: December 20, 1945; Warrington, Cheshire, United Kingdom
- Died: August 30, 2020 (aged 74); Lincoln City, Oregon, U.S.
- Batted: Left Threw: Right

MLB debut
- September 15, 1969, for the Houston Astros

Last MLB appearance
- October 1, 1970, for the Houston Astros

MLB statistics
- Batting average: .238
- Home runs: 1
- Runs batted in: 7
- Stats at Baseball Reference

Teams
- Houston Astros (1969–1970)

Christopher Keith Lampard (December 20, 1945 – August 30, 2020) was a professional baseball player.

Born in Warrington, Cheshire, England, to English parents, Lampard and his family emigrated to Oregon when he was three years old. He grew up in Portland, where he played Little League baseball, and attended the University of Oregon. Lampard played in the 1958 Little League World Series, alongside fellow future major-leaguer, Rick Wise.

An outfielder, Lampard was drafted by the Houston Astros in the second round of the 1965 Major League Baseball draft and spent nine seasons in professional baseball, including the final weeks of 1969 and much of 1970 in the Major Leagues with the Astros.

Lampard stood 6 feet 2 inches (1.88 m) tall and weighed 197 pounds (89 kg) (14 stone 1), threw right-handed and batted left-handed. In his 1969 audition, in which he mostly served as a pinch hitter, Lampard collected three hits in 12 at bats — the biggest of which was a walk-off pinch-hit home run against Wayne Granger on September 19 that gave Houston a come-from-behind 3–2 victory over the Cincinnati Reds. The home run came in Lampard's fourth Major League game, and would be the only four-base blow of his 62-game MLB career. Altogether, Lampard had 20 hits, with eight doubles and one triple, as a Major Leaguer.

Besides, Lampard was an outstanding Minor League batsman, hitting over 100 career home runs during his 1965–1973 career.

Lampard died on August 30, 2020.

== See also ==
- List of Major League Baseball players from Europe
