= Fred Gladding =

American baseball player (1936–2015)

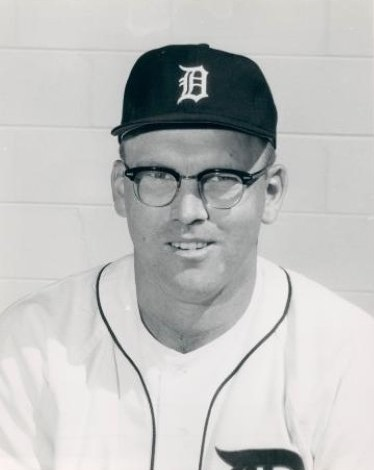
- Gladding in 1964
- Pitcher
- Born: June 28, 1936; Flat Rock, Michigan, U.S.
- Died: May 21, 2015 (aged 78); Columbia, South Carolina, U.S.
- Batted: Left Threw: Right

MLB debut
- July 1, 1961, for the Detroit Tigers

Last MLB appearance
- June 2, 1973, for the Houston Astros

MLB statistics
- Win–loss record: 48–34
- Earned run average: 3.13
- Strikeouts: 394
- Saves: 109
- Stats at Baseball Reference

Teams
- Detroit Tigers (1961–1967); Houston Astros (1968–1973)

Career highlights and awards
- NL saves leader (1969)

Fred Earl Gladding (June 28, 1936 – May 21, 2015) was an American professional baseball player and coach. He was a right-handed pitcher for all or parts of 13 seasons (1961–1973) with the Detroit Tigers and Houston Astros. He was born in Flat Rock, Michigan, and attended Flat Rock Community High School. He was listed at 6 feet 1 inch (1.85 m) tall and 220 pounds (100 kg).

For his career, he compiled a 48–34 record and 109 saves in 450 appearances, all but one as a relief pitcher, with a 3.13 earned run average and 394 strikeouts in 601 innings pitched. Gladding led the National League in saves with Houston in 1969, the first season the statistic was officially recognized.

In seven seasons with the Tigers, Gladding compiled a career record of 26–11 and a 2.70 ERA in 217 games. His .703 winning percentage with the Tigers is the highest in the franchise's history for a pitcher appearing in at least 200 games for the team. He returned to Detroit in 1976 as pitching coach and served three seasons on the staff of manager Ralph Houk.

Gladding also has the distinction of having the lowest non-zero lifetime batting average in major league history. For his career he batted .016 (1 for 63).

Gladding died on May 21, 2015, in Columbia, South Carolina.

== See also ==
- Detroit Tigers team records § Best pitching seasons by a Tiger with sortable statistics
- Houston Astros award winners and league leaders
- List of Major League Baseball annual saves leaders

Preceded by Steve Hamilton	Detroit Tigers pitching coach 1976–1978	Succeeded by Johnny Grodzicki
