= Wade Blasingame =

American baseball player (born 1943)

- Pitcher
- Born: November 22, 1943 (age 81); Deming, New Mexico, U.S.
- Batted: Left Threw: Left

MLB debut
- September 17, 1963, for the Milwaukee Braves

Last MLB appearance
- September 22, 1972, for the New York Yankees

MLB statistics
- Win–loss record: 46–51
- Earned run average: 4.52
- Strikeouts: 512
- Stats at Baseball Reference

Teams
- Milwaukee / Atlanta Braves (1963–1967); Houston Astros (1967–1972); New York Yankees (1972)

Wade Allen Blasingame (born November 22, 1943) is an American former professional baseball player and left-handed pitcher who appeared in 222 games in Major League Baseball for the Milwaukee / Atlanta Braves, Houston Astros and New York Yankees from 1963 through 1972. Born in Deming, New Mexico, he was listed as 6 feet 1 inch (1.85 m) tall and 185 pounds (84 kg).

Blasingame was a pitching star at Theodore Roosevelt High School in Fresno, California, prior to his professional career, compiling a perfect, 26–0 won–lost record over the course of his schoolboy career. He signed with the Braves in 1961 for a $125,000 bonus. After beginning his career at the Class C level, he rose through the Milwaukee organization, spending parts of both 1963 and 1964 with the Braves before sticking with the 1965 edition, the team's last year in Milwaukee before relocating to Atlanta. In 38 games, including 36 starts, Blasingame set personal bests in games won (16), complete games (10), innings pitched (2242/3) and strikeouts (117). He also was the top-fielding pitcher in the National League, handling 62 chances without an error.

But Blasingame was beset by finger and shoulder woes in 1966, and he struggled to a 3–7 record. The following June, he was traded to Houston, where he won only 17 of 45 decisions over all or parts of six seasons, not including a 16-game stint with Triple-A Oklahoma City in 1970. Blasingame finished his MLB career with the Yankees in 1972 pitching mainly out of the bullpen.

In his ten seasons in MLB he had a 46–51 record in 222 games pitched (128 as a starter), with a 4.52 earned run average and a 1.462 WHIP. He was credited with 16 complete games, two shutouts, 31 games finished and five saves. In 863 2/3 innings pitched, he allowed 891 hits, 486 runs, 434 earned runs, 75 home runs and 372 bases on balls. He had 512 strikeouts, 30 hit batsmen and 62 wild pitches, while facing 3,763 batters. He was charged with 32 intentional walks and one balk.

In 1985, Blasingame was inducted into the Fresno County Athletic Hall of Fame.
