= Ron Willis =

American baseball player (1943–1977)

- Pitcher
- Born: July 12, 1943; Willisville, Tennessee, U.S.
- Died: November 21, 1977 (aged 34); Memphis, Tennessee, U.S.
- Batted: Right Threw: Right

MLB debut
- September 20, 1966, for the St. Louis Cardinals

Last MLB appearance
- September 29, 1970, for the San Diego Padres

MLB statistics
- Win–loss record: 11–12
- Earned run average: 3.32
- Strikeouts: 128
- Stats at Baseball Reference

Teams
- St. Louis Cardinals (1966–1969); Houston Astros (1969); San Diego Padres (1970)

Career highlights and awards
- World Series champion (1967)

Ronald Earl Willis (July 12, 1943 – November 21, 1977) was an American professional baseball player. He was a pitcher over parts of five seasons (1966–1970) with the St. Louis Cardinals, Houston Astros and San Diego Padres. Willis was a member of the 1967 World Series champion Cardinals. He was dealt from the Cardinals to the Padres for Bobby Etheridge before the trade deadline on June 15, 1970. For his career he compiled an 11–12 record with a 3.32 earned run average and 128 strikeouts in 188 appearances, all as a relief pitcher.

In 238.1 innings of work, he handled 80 chances (24 putouts, 56 assists) without an error for a perfect 1.000 fielding percentage.

Willis was born in Willisville, near Newbern, Tennessee, and later died in Memphis at the age of 34 from a brain tumor.
