= Bob Watkins =

American baseball player (born 1948)

- Pitcher
- Born: March 12, 1948 (age 77); San Francisco, California
- Batted: Right Threw: Right

MLB debut
- September 6, 1969, for the Houston Astros

Last MLB appearance
- September 26, 1969, for the Houston Astros

MLB statistics
- Earned run average: 5.17
- Record: 0-0
- Strikeouts: 11
- Stats at Baseball Reference

Teams
- Houston Astros (1969)

Robert Cecil Watkins (born March 12, 1948) is a former pitcher in Major League Baseball who played for the Houston Astros in 1969. He was selected by the Astros in the 1966 amateur draft.
