= Tom Griffin (baseball) =

American baseball player (born 1948)

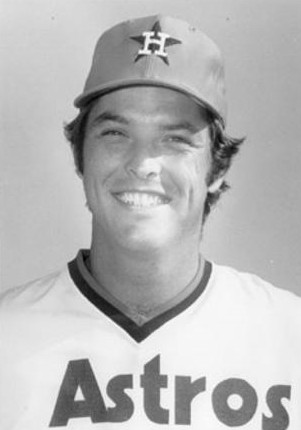
- 1976
- Pitcher
- Born: February 22, 1948 (age 78); Los Angeles, California, U.S.
- Batted: Right Threw: Right

MLB debut
- April 10, 1969, for the Houston Astros

Last MLB appearance
- May 11, 1982, for the Pittsburgh Pirates

MLB statistics
- Win–loss record: 77–94
- Earned run average: 4.07
- Strikeouts: 1,054
- Stats at Baseball Reference

Teams
- Houston Astros (1969–1976); San Diego Padres (1976–1977); California Angels (1978); San Francisco Giants (1979–1981); Pittsburgh Pirates (1982)

Thomas James Griffin (born February 22, 1948) is an American former professional baseball pitcher. He played all or part of 14 seasons in Major League Baseball (1969–1982), for the Houston Astros, San Diego Padres, California Angels, San Francisco Giants, and Pittsburgh Pirates.

== Career ==
Griffin was selected in the 1st round (4th overall) in the 1966 January Regular Baseball Draft by the Houston Astros out of Grant High School, in Los Angeles, where he was the quarterback on the football team as well as pitching on the baseball team.

Griffin made his debut on April 10, 1969, against the San Diego Padres. He pitched seven innings while striking out eight and walking five and allowing two runs on three hits, but the Padres prevailed 2–0. In that season, he would go 11–10 with a 3.54 ERA in 31 games, pitching 188.1 innings while striking out 200 batters and walking 93, with the latter two being highs for Griffin. Two additional pitchers in Larry Dierker and Don Wilson joined him in having at least 200 strikeouts, the second team to ever have three 200+ strikeout pitchers. It took the final start of the year for Griffin to reach the 200 plateau, which he did with his sixth strikeout of the September 28th game against the Cincinnati Reds, doing so against Woody Woodward in the sixth in a 4–1 loss. He led the league in strikeouts per nine innings with 9.6.

He would regress significantly in the next few seasons. In 1970, he pitched in 23 games while having a 3–13 record with a 5.74 ERA in 111.1 innings, having 72 walks and strikeouts and 13 wild pitches (6th in the National League). The next year, he appeared in just 10 games, going 0–6 with a 4.78 ERA in 37.2 innings while having 20 walks and 29 strikeouts. He was shifted to appearing in the middle of games for 1972, appearing in 39 games while starting just five, and he went 5–4 with 3 saves on a 3.24 ERA in 94.1 innings while having 38 walks and 83 strikeouts.

1974 indicated a last flickering of growth. He went 14–10 with a 3.54 ERA in 34 games (all starts) in 211 innings with a career-high eight complete games. He struck out 110 batters and walked 89 (both peaks that would never be that high in his remaining eight years). He was 8th in shutouts with three while 5th in wild pitches with 11 and 3rd in errors with 8th. On May 7, 1974, Griffin threw a one-hitter against the Pittsburgh Pirates. He allowed one hit while allowing a run to score on three errors in the field (including a balk), but the Astros won 2–1.

1976 was a bumpy road for Griffin. In 20 games for the Astros (two starts), he went 5–3 with a 6.05 ERA in 41.2 innings, striking out 33 with 37 walks. Griffin was taken on waivers by the Padres on August 3, 1976. He went 4–3 with a 2.94 ERA in 11 games (all starts) in 70.1 innings, striking out 36 with 42 walks. The next season, he went 6–9 with a 4.46 ERA in 38 games (20 starts) in 151.1 innings, walking 88 batters with 79 strikeouts. He became a free agent after the 1977 season, signing with the California Angels on January 27. He went 3–4 with a 4.02 ERA in 24 games (4 starts) and 56 innings while striking out 35 and walking 31. He was released by the team after the end of the 1978 season.

He signed on with the San Francisco Giants on April 4, 1979. He went 5–6 that year, having a 3.91 ERA in 59 games (3 starts) as he garnered two saves in 94.1 innings, striking out 82 with 46 walks. The following year, he went 5–1 with a 2.76 ERA in 42 games (four starts) in 107.2 innings as he struck out 79 with 49 walks, although he led the league in hit batsmen with eight. In 1981, he went 8–8 with a 3.76 ERA in 22 games (all starts) in 129.1 innings while striking out 83 and walking 57 and leading the league in hit batsmen with seven. He was traded to Pittsburgh on December 11, 1981 for Doe Boyland. He would play in just six games for the Pirates, going 1–3 with a 8.87 ERA in 22.1 innings, walking 15 and striking out 8. Oddly enough, his last game of his career was against his old team in Houston on May 11. He pitched four innings while allowing three earned runs with one strikeout and six walks as the losing pitcher in a 4–2 Astros win. Four days later, he was released by the Pirates.
