= 1971 Major League Baseball All-Star Game =

1971 American baseball competition

	1	2	3	4	5	6	7	8	9	R	H	E
National League	0	2	1	0	0	0	0	1	0	4	5	0
American League	0	0	4	0	0	2	0	0	X	6	7	0
- Date: July 13, 1971
- Venue: Tiger Stadium
- City: Detroit
- Managers: Sparky Anderson (CIN); Earl Weaver (BAL)
- MVP: Frank Robinson (BAL)
- Attendance: 53,559
- Ceremonial first pitch: Charlie Gehringer
- Television: NBC
- TV announcers: Curt Gowdy and Tony Kubek
- Radio: NBC
- Radio announcers: Jim Simpson and Sandy Koufax

The 1971 Major League Baseball All-Star Game, the 42nd edition, was played on Tuesday, July 13. The all-stars from the American League and the National League faced each other at Tiger Stadium, home of the Detroit Tigers, and the home team AL won 6–4.

This was the third time that the Tigers had hosted the All-Star Game (1941, 1951); the same venue was previously known as Briggs Stadium. It was the second All-Star Game played at night, the first in prime-time in an American League park, and the last in Tiger Stadium. When the event returned to Detroit 34 years later in 2005, it was at Comerica Park, the Tigers' home since 2000.

It was the American League's first win since the second game of 1962, and was their last until 1983. Over the twenty game stretch from 1963–1982, the AL was 1–19 (.050), the worst run for either league in the history of the exhibition.

== National League roster ==
The National League roster included fifteen future Hall of Fame players and coaches, denoted in italics.

=== Elected starters ===
Position	Player	Team	Notes
C	Johnny Bench	Cincinnati Reds
1B	Willie McCovey	San Francisco Giants
2B	Glenn Beckert	Chicago Cubs
3B	Joe Torre	St. Louis Cardinals
SS	Bud Harrelson	New York Mets
OF	Hank Aaron	Atlanta Braves
OF	Willie Mays	San Francisco Giants
OF	Willie Stargell	Pittsburgh Pirates

=== Pitchers ===
Throws	Pitcher	Team	Notes
LH	Steve Carlton	St. Louis Cardinals	did not pitch
RH	Clay Carroll	Cincinnati Reds
RH	Larry Dierker	Houston Astros	injured
RH	Dock Ellis	Pittsburgh Pirates	starting pitcher
RH	Ferguson Jenkins	Chicago Cubs
RH	Juan Marichal	San Francisco Giants
RH	Tom Seaver	New York Mets	did not pitch
RH	Don Wilson	Houston Astros
RH	Rick Wise	Philadelphia Phillies	did not pitch

=== Reserve position players ===
Position	Player	Team	Notes
C	Manny Sanguillén	Pittsburgh Pirates	did not play
1B	Nate Colbert	San Diego Padres
1B	Lee May	Cincinnati Reds
2B	Félix Millán	Atlanta Braves
3B	Ron Santo	Chicago Cubs
SS	Don Kessinger	Chicago Cubs
OF	Bobby Bonds	San Francisco Giants
OF	Lou Brock	St. Louis Cardinals
OF	Roberto Clemente	Pittsburgh Pirates
OF	Willie Davis	Los Angeles Dodgers
OF	Pete Rose	Cincinnati Reds
OF	Rusty Staub	Montreal Expos	did not play

=== Coaching staff ===
Position	Manager	Team
Manager	Sparky Anderson	Cincinnati Reds
Coach	Walter Alston	Los Angeles Dodgers
Coach	Preston Gómez	San Diego Padres
Coach	Danny Murtaugh	Pittsburgh Pirates

== American League roster ==
The American League squad featured eleven future Hall of Fame players and coaches, denoted in italics.

=== Elected Starters ===
Position	Player	Team	Notes
C	Ray Fosse	Cleveland Indians	injured
1B	Boog Powell	Baltimore Orioles	did not play
2B	Rod Carew	Minnesota Twins
3B	Brooks Robinson	Baltimore Orioles
SS	Luis Aparicio	Boston Red Sox
OF	Tony Oliva	Minnesota Twins	injured
OF	Frank Robinson	Baltimore Orioles
OF	Carl Yastrzemski	Boston Red Sox

=== Pitchers ===
Throws	Pitcher	Team	Notes
LH	Vida Blue	Oakland Athletics	starting pitcher
LH	Mike Cuellar	Baltimore Orioles
LH	Mickey Lolich	Detroit Tigers
LH	Sam McDowell	Cleveland Indians	injured
RH	Andy Messersmith	California Angels	did not pitch
RH	Jim Palmer	Baltimore Orioles
RH	Marty Pattin	Milwaukee Brewers	did not pitch
RH	Jim Perry	Minnesota Twins	did not pitch
RH	Sonny Siebert	Boston Red Sox	did not pitch
LH	Wilbur Wood	Chicago White Sox	did not pitch

=== Reserve position players ===
Position	Player	Team	Notes
C	Dave Duncan	Oakland Athletics	did not play
C	Bill Freehan	Detroit Tigers	started for Fosse
C	Thurman Munson	New York Yankees
1B	Norm Cash	Detroit Tigers	started for Powell
2B	Cookie Rojas	Kansas City Royals
3B	Harmon Killebrew	Minnesota Twins
3B	Bill Melton	Chicago White Sox	did not play
OF	Don Buford	Baltimore Orioles
OF	Frank Howard	Washington Senators
OF	Reggie Jackson	Oakland Athletics
OF	Al Kaline	Detroit Tigers
OF	Bobby Murcer	New York Yankees	started for Oliva
OF	Amos Otis	Kansas City Royals

=== Coaching staff ===
Position	Manager	Team
Manager	Earl Weaver	Baltimore Orioles
Coach	Billy Hunter	Baltimore Orioles
Coach	Billy Martin	Detroit Tigers

== Starting lineups ==
While the starters were elected by the fans, the batting orders and starting pitchers were selected by the managers.

National League				American League			
Order	Player	Team	Position	Order	Player	Team	Position
1	Willie Mays	San Francisco Giants	CF	1	Rod Carew	Minnesota Twins	2B
2	Hank Aaron	Atlanta Braves	RF	2	Bobby Murcer	New York Yankees	CF
3	Joe Torre	St. Louis Cardinals	3B	3	Carl Yastrzemski	Boston Red Sox	LF
4	Willie Stargell	Pittsburgh Pirates	LF	4	Frank Robinson	Baltimore Orioles	RF
5	Willie McCovey	San Francisco Giants	1B	5	Norm Cash	Detroit Tigers	1B
6	Johnny Bench	Cincinnati Reds	C	6	Brooks Robinson	Baltimore Orioles	3B
7	Glenn Beckert	Chicago Cubs	2B	7	Bill Freehan	Detroit Tigers	C
8	Bud Harrelson	New York Mets	SS	8	Luis Aparicio	Boston Red Sox	SS
9	Dock Ellis	Pittsburgh Pirates	P	9	Vida Blue	Oakland Athletics	P

== Umpires ==
Jake O'Donnell retired from umpiring after the 1971 season, after only three years on the job, but went on to work through 1995 as a referee in the NBA, earning assignment to every NBA Finals between 1972 and 1994. His work in this game makes him the only person to officiate in a Major League Baseball All-Star Game and an NBA All-Star Game.

Coincidentally, Denkinger wore uniform number 11 from 1980 to 1998, the same number O'Donnell wore as an NBA official. The American League did not use uniform numbers for its umpires prior to 1980; the National League began using them in the 1960s.

Position	Umpire
Home Plate	Frank Umont (AL)
First Base	Paul Pryor (NL)
Second Base	Jake O'Donnell (AL)
Third Base	Doug Harvey (NL)
Left Field	Don Denkinger (AL)
Right Field	Nick Colosi (NL)

== Scoring summary ==
With a gusty wind blowing to right, all ten runs were scored on home runs, three for each side.

The NL opened the scoring off starter Vida Blue in the top of the second inning. Willie Stargell was hit by a pitch to lead off. With one out, 23-year-old catcher Johnny Bench hit a two-run home run into the upper deck in deep right center. In the top of the third inning, Hank Aaron launched a two-out solo home run (his first career All-Star Game extra-base hit) into the upper deck in right off of Blue to give the NL a 3–0 lead.

The AL responded in the bottom of the third inning. With Dock Ellis still pitching, Luis Aparicio singled to center to lead off the inning, and Reggie Jackson pinch-hit for pitcher Blue. On a 1–2 count, Jackson crushed a two-run home run high off the light tower atop the right center field roof. Rod Carew walked, Bobby Murcer hit an infield pop fly, which drifted and was caught near first base by third baseman Joe Torre. Carl Yastrzemski flied out to left field, held up in the wind and caught by shortstop Bud Harrelson. With two outs, Frank Robinson hit a two-run home run to right to give the AL a 4–3 lead, then Norm Cash was caught looking.

In the bottom of the sixth, Cubs' pitcher Ferguson Jenkins gave up a first pitch single to center by Al Kaline of the hometown Tigers. The next batter, Harmon Killebrew, launched the third two-run home run of the game for the American League. This one was pulled to the upper deck in left, against the wind, on a full count. Brooks Robinson singled, but did not advance, as a fly out to center and a 4-6-3 double play ended the inning.

In the top of the eighth, lefthander Mickey Lolich of the Tigers caught Bobby Bonds looking, but next up was Roberto Clemente (1934–1972); in his final All-Star Game at-bat, he launched a 3–1 pitch to the upper deck in deep right center, followed by weak ground outs by Lee May and Ron Santo. In the ninth, Lolich retired the side in order (Lou Brock, Don Kessinger, Bench) for a six-out save.

=== Line score ===
Tuesday, July 13, 1971 7:15 pm (EST) at Tiger Stadium in Detroit, Michigan
Team	1	2	3	4	5	6	7	8	9	R	H	E
National League	0	2	1	0	0	0	0	1	0	4	5	0
American League	0	0	4	0	0	2	0	0	X	6	7	0
WP: Vida Blue (1-0) LP: Dock Ellis (0-1) Sv: Mickey Lolich (1); Home runs: NL: Johnny Bench (1), Hank Aaron (1), Roberto Clemente (1); AL: Reggie Jackson (1), Frank Robinson (1), Harmon Killebrew (1)

== Game notes and records ==
Vida Blue was credited with the win. Dock Ellis was credited with the loss. Hometown favorite Mickey Lolich was credited with the save, the first official save in an MLB All-Star Game.

All of the scoring came via the home run, all six home runs hit in the game and all the runs scored were by future Hall of Fame players. The six total home runs hit by both teams tied an All-Star Game record. Besides the home runs, the National League got singles by Bench and Willie Davis; the American League got singles by Murcer, Kaline, Aparicio, and Brooks Robinson. All of them, except Davis and Murcer, were eventually inducted in Cooperstown

Frank Robinson became the first player in All-Star Game history to hit home runs for both leagues over the course of his career.

Reggie Jackson's home run is described as "especially memorable", as it hit one of the light standards on the roof of the stadium, credibly estimated to have landed 520 feet from home plate.

Roberto Clemente would be named to the 1972 National League squad, but would be replaced due to injury. This game marked his final All-Star Game appearance.

Yankee catcher Thurman Munson came in to catch in the top of the eighth inning, but did not bat.

A total of 26 future Hall of Famers were present for this game: 21 players, both managers, National League coach Walt Alston, Hall of Fame umpire Doug Harvey, and future Hall of Fame manager Joe Torre.

This was the final All-Star Game in which a majority of players wore uniforms made of wool flannel. In the 1972 All-Star Game at Atlanta, only the Expos, Royals and Yankees were still wearing flannels full-time. Players from the Orioles, Pirates and Cardinals wore polyester uniforms in this All-Star Game.
