= 1971 Montreal Expos season =

1971 Montreal Expos
- League: National League
- Division: East
- Ballpark: Jarry Park
- City: Montreal
- Record: 71–90 (.441)
- Divisional place: 5th
- Owners: Charles Bronfman
- General managers: Jim Fanning
- Managers: Gene Mauch
- Television: CBC Television (Don Drysdale, Dave Van Horne); Télévision de Radio-Canada (Jean-Pierre Roy, Guy Ferron)
- Radio: CFCF (English) (Dave Van Horne, Russ Taylor); CKLM (French) (Jean-Paul Sarault, Jean-Pierre Roy)

The 1971 Montreal Expos season was the third season in the history of the franchise. The Expos finished in fifth place in the National League East with a record of 71–90, 25 1/2 games behind the Pittsburgh Pirates.

== Offseason ==
- December 30, 1970: Dave McDonald was traded by the Expos to the San Francisco Giants for Ron Hunt.
- January 1971: Jack Scalia was selected by the Expos third overall in the January phase of the 1971 Major League Baseball draft, which the held two lotteries annually. Scalia would never play a game for the Expos, as he suffered a back injury and pursued a modeling career.
- March 31, 1971: Don Hahn was traded by the Expos to the New York Mets for Rich Hacker and Ron Swoboda.
- March 31, 1971: Jim Qualls was traded by the Expos to the Cincinnati Reds for Stan Swanson.

== Spring training ==
The Expos held spring training at West Palm Beach Municipal Stadium in West Palm Beach, Florida, a facility they shared with the Atlanta Braves. It was their third season at the stadium.

== Regular season ==
=== Season standings ===
NL East
Team	W	L	Pct.	GB	Home	Road
Pittsburgh Pirates	97	65	.599	—	52‍–‍28	45‍–‍37
St. Louis Cardinals	90	72	.556	7	45‍–‍36	45‍–‍36
Chicago Cubs	83	79	.512	14	44‍–‍37	39‍–‍42
New York Mets	83	79	.512	14	44‍–‍37	39‍–‍42
Montreal Expos	71	90	.441	25½	36‍–‍44	35‍–‍46
Philadelphia Phillies	67	95	.414	30	34‍–‍47	33‍–‍48

=== Record vs. opponents ===
1971 National League record Sources:
Team	ATL	CHC	CIN	HOU	LAD	MON	NYM	PHI	PIT	SD	SF	STL
Atlanta	—	5–7	9–9	9–9	9–9	7–5	7–5	8–4	4–8	11–7	7–11	6–6
Chicago	7–5	—	6–6	5–7	8–4	8–10	11–7	11–7	6–12	9–3	3–9	9–9
Cincinnati	9–9	6–6	—	5–13	7–11	7–5	8–4	5–7	5–7	10–8	9–9	8–4
Houston	9–9	7–5	13–5	—	8–10	4–8	5–7	8–4	4–8	10–8	9–9	2–10
Los Angeles	9–9	4–8	11–7	10–8	—	8–4	5–7	7–5	4–8	13–5	12–6	6–6
Montreal	5–7	10–8	5–7	8–4	4–8	—	9–9	6–12	7–11	6–5	7–5	4–14
New York	5–7	7–11	4–8	7–5	7–5	9–9	—	13–5	10–8	7–5	4–8	10–8
Philadelphia	4-8	7–11	2–10	3–9	5–7	6–10	5–13	—	6–12	4–8	6–6	7–11
Pittsburgh	8–4	12–6	7–5	8–4	8–4	11–7	8–10	12–6	—	9–3	3–9	11–7
San Diego	7–11	3–9	8–10	8–10	5–13	5–6	5–7	8–4	3–9	—	5–13	4–8
San Francisco	11–7	9–3	9–9	9–9	6–12	5–7	8–4	6–6	9–3	13–5	—	5–7
St. Louis	6–6	9–9	4–8	10–2	6–6	14–4	8–10	11–7	7–11	8–4	7–5	—

=== Opening Day starters ===
- Boots Day CF
- Ron Hunt 2B
- Rusty Staub RF
- Bob Bailey 3B
- Ron Fairly 1B
- Mack Jones LF
- John Bateman C
- Bobby Wine SS
- Carl Morton P

=== Notable transactions ===
- June 8, 1971: 1971 Major League Baseball draft
  - Future Canadian Football League star Condredge Holloway was drafted by Expos in the 1st round (4th pick).
  - Steve Rogers was drafted by the Expos in the 1st round (4th pick) of the Secondary Phase.
- June 15, 1971: Bob Reynolds was traded by the Expos to the St. Louis Cardinals for Mike Torrez.
- June 16, 1971: Jimy Williams was purchased from the Expos by the New York Mets.
- June 25, 1971: Ron Swoboda was traded by the Expos to the New York Yankees for Ron Woods.

== Roster ==
1971 Montreal Expos
Roster
Pitchers: 27 Jim Britton; 28 Mike Marshall; 21 Ernie McAnally; 25 Dan McGinn; 44 Carl Morton; 23 John O'Donoghue; 16 Claude Raymond; 29 Howie Reed; 18 Steve Renko; 26 Bill Stoneman; 36 John Strohmayer; 24 Mike Torrez	Catchers: 2 John Bateman; 12 John Boccabella; 22 Terry Humphrey; Infielders: 3 Bob Bailey; 11 Ron Brand; 6 Ron Fairly; 20 Rich Hacker; 33 Ron Hunt; 39 Coco Laboy; 17 Dave McDonald; 1 Gary Sutherland; 7 Bobby Wine	Outfielders: 8 Boots Day; 35 Jim Fairey; 42 Jim Gosger; 9 Mack Jones; 5 Clyde Mashore; 10 Rusty Staub; 37 Stan Swanson; 14 Ron Swoboda; 43 Ron Woods	Manager: 4 Gene Mauch; Coaches: 34 Jimmy Bragan (First base); 14 Larry Doby (Hitting/first base); 32 Cal McLish (Pitching); 30 Don Zimmer (Third base); 31 Jerry Zimmerman (Bullpen)

== Player stats ==
= Indicates team leader

=== Batting ===
==== Starters by position ====
Note: Pos = Position; G = Games played; AB = At bats; H = Hits; Avg. = Batting average; HR = Home runs; RBI = Runs batted in

Pos	Player	G	AB	H	Avg.	HR	RBI
C	John Bateman	139	492	119	.242	10	56
1B	Ron Fairly	146	447	115	.257	13	71
2B	Ron Hunt	152	520	145	.279	5	38
SS	Bobby Wine	119	340	68	.200	1	16
3B	Bob Bailey	157	545	137	.251	14	83
LF	Jim Fairey	92	200	49	.245	1	19
CF	Boots Day	127	371	105	.283	4	33
RF	Rusty Staub	162	599	186	.311	19	97

==== Other batters ====
Note: G = Games played; AB = At bats; H = Hits; Avg. = Batting average; HR = Home runs; RBI = Runs batted in

Player	G	AB	H	Avg.	HR	RBI
Gary Sutherland	111	304	78	.257	4	26
John Boccabella	74	177	39	.220	3	15
Coco Laboy	76	151	38	.252	1	14
Ron Woods	51	138	41	.297	1	17
Clyde Mashore	66	114	22	.193	1	7
Stan Swanson	49	106	26	.245	2	11
Jim Gosger	51	102	16	.157	0	8
Mack Jones	43	91	15	.165	3	9
Ron Swoboda	39	75	19	.253	0	6
Ron Brand	47	56	12	.214	0	1
Dave McDonald	24	39	4	.103	1	4
Rich Hacker	16	33	4	.121	0	2
Terry Humphrey	9	26	5	.192	0	1

=== Pitching ===
==== Starting pitchers ====
Note: G = Games pitched; IP = Innings pitched; W = Wins; L = Losses; ERA = Earned run average; SO = Strikeouts

Player	G	IP	W	L	ERA	SO
Bill Stoneman	39	294.2	17	16	3.15	251
Steve Renko	40	275.2	15	14	3.75	129
Carl Morton	36	213.2	10	18	4.80	84
Ernie McAnally	31	177.2	11	12	3.90	98

==== Other pitchers ====
Note: G = Games pitched; IP = Innings pitched; W = Wins; L = Losses; ERA = Earned run average; SO = Strikeouts

Player	G	IP	W	L	ERA	SO
John Strohmayer	27	114.0	7	5	4.34	56
Dan McGinn	28	71.0	1	4	5.96	40
Jim Britton	16	45.2	2	3	5.72	23

==== Relief pitchers ====
Note: G = Games pitched; W = Wins; L = Losses; SV = Saves; ERA = Earned run average; SO = Strikeouts

Player	G	W	L	SV	ERA	SO
Mike Marshall	66	5	8	23	4.28	85
Howie Reed	43	2	3	0	4.29	25
Claude Raymond	37	1	7	0	4.70	29
John O'Donoghue	13	0	0	0	4.67	7
Mike Torrez	1	0	0	0	0.00	2

== Award winners ==
1971 Major League Baseball All-Star Game

- Rusty Staub, Injured, Did not play

== Farm system ==
Level	Team	League	Manager
AAA	Winnipeg Whips	International League	Clyde McCullough and Jimmy Bragan
AA	Québec Carnavals	Eastern League	Gus Niarhos
A	West Palm Beach Expos	Florida State League	Bobby Malkmus
A-Short Season	Jamestown Falcons	New York–Penn League	Ed Sadowski
A-Short Season	Watertown Expos	Northern League	Bob Oldis
