= 1971 San Francisco Giants season =

1971 San Francisco Giants
- National League West champions
- League: National League
- Division: West
- Ballpark: Candlestick Park
- City: San Francisco
- Owners: Horace Stoneham
- General managers: Jerry Donovan
- Managers: Charlie Fox
- Television: KTVU (Lon Simmons, Bill Thompson)
- Radio: KSFO (Lon Simmons, Bill Thompson)

The 1971 San Francisco Giants season was the Giants' 89th year in Major League Baseball, their 14th year in San Francisco since their move from New York following the 1957 season, and their 12th at Candlestick Park. The team finished in first place in the National League West with a 90–72 record. The Giants faced the Pittsburgh Pirates in the NLCS, losing three games to one. The Giants were the only team to win the NL West in the 1970s other than the Cincinnati Reds and the Los Angeles Dodgers.

== Offseason ==
- December 30, 1970: Ron Hunt was traded by the Giants to the Montreal Expos for Dave McDonald.

== Regular season ==
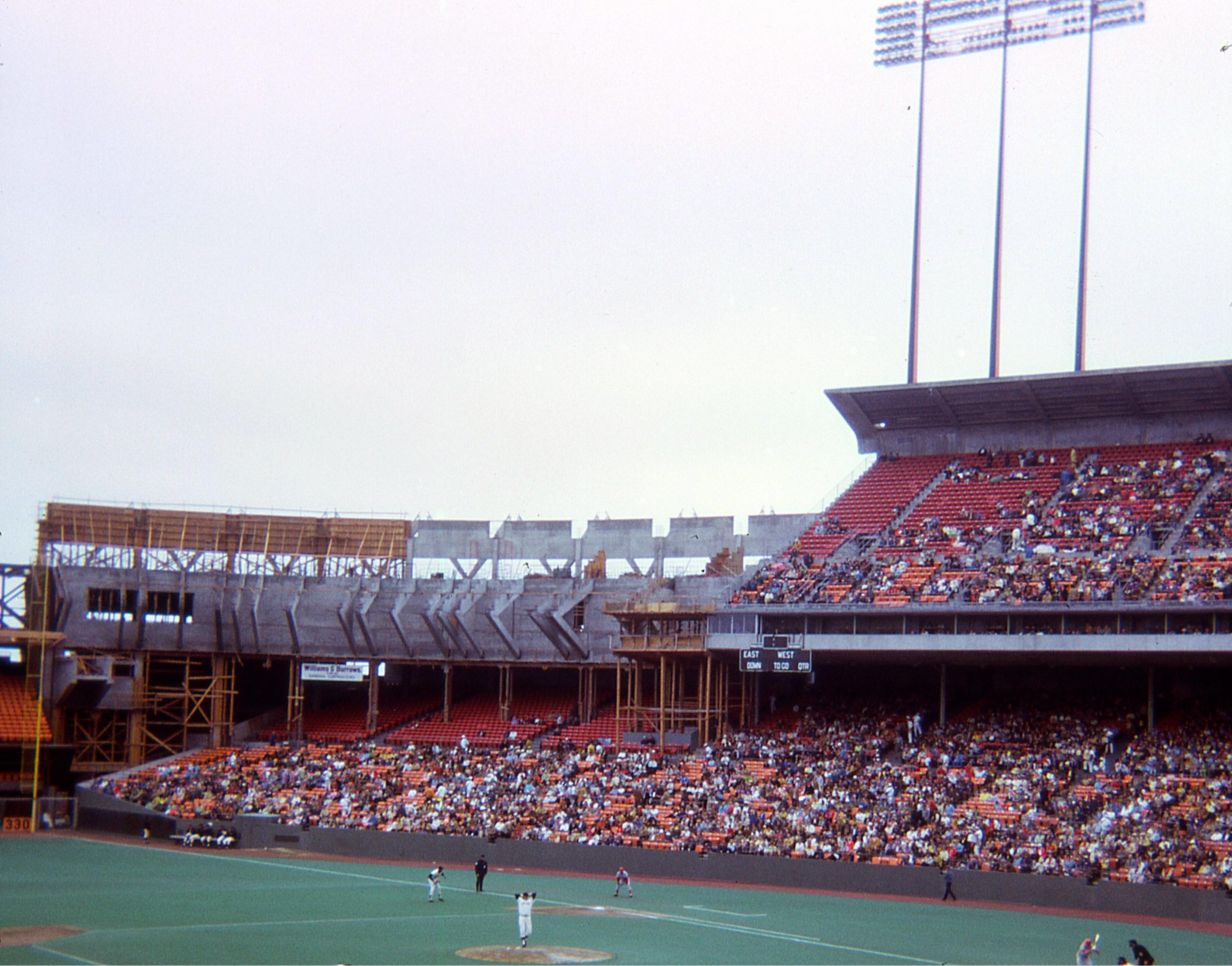
The Giants play at Candlestick Park, July 1971, with upper deck expansion in progress.

- The Giants battled their arch rival, the Los Angeles Dodgers, throughout the season for the NL West Division lead. The Giants led by 8.5 games on September 1. In mid September the Dodgers won 8 in a row, including 5 over the Giants to narrow the gap to one game. On the final day of the season, rookie Dave Kingman homered, leading the Giants to a win over the San Diego Padres to take the division crown, allowing Juan Marichal, Willie Mays, and Willie McCovey to play in the post season for the last time together.
- September 5, 1971: In a game against the Giants, J. R. Richard of the Houston Astros struck out 15 batters in his very first game, tying a Major League record first set by Karl Spooner.

=== Season standings ===
NL West
Team	W	L	Pct.	GB	Home	Road
San Francisco Giants	90	72	.556	—	51‍–‍30	39‍–‍42
Los Angeles Dodgers	89	73	.549	1	42‍–‍39	47‍–‍34
Atlanta Braves	82	80	.506	8	43‍–‍39	39‍–‍41
Cincinnati Reds	79	83	.488	11	46‍–‍35	33‍–‍48
Houston Astros	79	83	.488	11	39‍–‍42	40‍–‍41
San Diego Padres	61	100	.379	28½	33‍–‍48	28‍–‍52

=== Record vs. opponents ===
1971 National League record Sources:
Team	ATL	CHC	CIN	HOU	LAD	MON	NYM	PHI	PIT	SD	SF	STL
Atlanta	—	5–7	9–9	9–9	9–9	7–5	7–5	8–4	4–8	11–7	7–11	6–6
Chicago	7–5	—	6–6	5–7	8–4	8–10	11–7	11–7	6–12	9–3	3–9	9–9
Cincinnati	9–9	6–6	—	5–13	7–11	7–5	8–4	5–7	5–7	10–8	9–9	8–4
Houston	9–9	7–5	13–5	—	8–10	4–8	5–7	8–4	4–8	10–8	9–9	2–10
Los Angeles	9–9	4–8	11–7	10–8	—	8–4	5–7	7–5	4–8	13–5	12–6	6–6
Montreal	5–7	10–8	5–7	8–4	4–8	—	9–9	6–12	7–11	6–5	7–5	4–14
New York	5–7	7–11	4–8	7–5	7–5	9–9	—	13–5	10–8	7–5	4–8	10–8
Philadelphia	4-8	7–11	2–10	3–9	5–7	6–10	5–13	—	6–12	4–8	6–6	7–11
Pittsburgh	8–4	12–6	7–5	8–4	8–4	11–7	8–10	12–6	—	9–3	3–9	11–7
San Diego	7–11	3–9	8–10	8–10	5–13	5–6	5–7	8–4	3–9	—	5–13	4–8
San Francisco	11–7	9–3	9–9	9–9	6–12	5–7	8–4	6–6	9–3	13–5	—	5–7
St. Louis	6–6	9–9	4–8	10–2	6–6	14–4	8–10	11–7	7–11	8–4	7–5	—

=== Notable transactions ===
- May 29, 1971: George Foster was traded by the Giants to the Cincinnati Reds for Frank Duffy and Vern Geishert.
- June 1, 1971: Bob Heise was traded by the Giants to the Milwaukee Brewers for Floyd Wicker.
- June 8, 1971: 1971 Major League Baseball draft
  - Frank Riccelli was drafted by the Giants in the 1st round (18th pick).
  - Willie Prall was drafted by the Giants in the 3rd round.

== Game log and schedule ==
Legend
	Giants win
	Giants loss
	Postponement
**Bold**	Giants team member

1971 Game Log (90–72) (Home: 51–30; Road: 39–42)
April (18–5) (Home: 8–2; Road: 10–3)

#	Date	Opponent	Score	Win	Loss	Save	Stadium	Attendance	Record	Report
1	April 6	@ Padres					San Diego Stadium			
2	April 7	@ Padres					San Diego Stadium			
3	April 8	@ Padres					San Diego Stadium			
4	April 10	@ Cardinals					Busch Memorial Stadium			
5	April 11	@ Cardinals					Busch Memorial Stadium			
6	April 11	@ Cardinals					Busch Memorial Stadium			
7	April 12	Padres					**Candlestick Park**			
8	April 14	Astros					**Candlestick Park**			
9	April 15	Astros					**Candlestick Park**			
10	April 16	Cubs					**Candlestick Park**			
11	April 17	Cubs					**Candlestick Park**			
12	April 18	Cubs					**Candlestick Park**			
13	April 18	Cubs					**Candlestick Park**			
14	April 19	Cardinals					**Candlestick Park**			
15	April 20	Cardinals					**Candlestick Park**			
16	April 21	Cardinals					**Candlestick Park**			
17	April 23	@ Pirates					Three Rivers Stadium			
18	April 24	@ Pirates					Three Rivers Stadium			
19	April 25	@ Pirates					Three Rivers Stadium			
20	April 27	@ Braves					Atlanta Stadium			
21	April 28	@ Braves					Atlanta Stadium			
22	April 29	@ Braves					Atlanta Stadium			
23	April 30	@ Reds					Riverfront Stadium			

May (19–9) (Home: 13–4; Road: 6–5)

#	Date	Opponent	Score	Win	Loss	Save	Stadium	Attendance	Record	Report
24	May 1	@ Reds					Riverfront Stadium			
25	May 2	@ Reds					Riverfront Stadium			
26	May 4	Pirates					**Candlestick Park**			
27	May 5	Pirates					**Candlestick Park**			
28	May 7	Braves					**Candlestick Park**			
29	May 7	Braves					**Candlestick Park**			
30	May 9	Braves					**Candlestick Park**			
31	May 9	Braves					**Candlestick Park**			
32	May 10	Reds					**Candlestick Park**			
33	May 11	Reds					**Candlestick Park**			
34	May 12	Reds					**Candlestick Park**			
35	May 14	Dodgers					**Candlestick Park**			
36	May 15	Dodgers					**Candlestick Park**			
37	May 16	Dodgers					**Candlestick Park**			
38	May 18	@ Cubs					Wrigley Field			
39	May 19	@ Cubs					Wrigley Field			
40	May 20	@ Cubs					Wrigley Field			
41	May 21	@ Astros					Astrodome			
42	May 22	@ Astros					Astrodome			
43	May 23	@ Astros					Astrodome			
44	May 25	@ Dodgers					Dodger Stadium			
45	May 26	@ Dodgers					Dodger Stadium			
46	May 27	@ Dodgers					Dodger Stadium			
47	May 28	Expos					**Candlestick Park**			
48	May 29	Expos					**Candlestick Park**			
49	May 30	Expos					**Candlestick Park**			
50	May 30	Expos					**Candlestick Park**			
51	May 31	Mets					**Candlestick Park**			

June (13–15) (Home: 8–5; Road: 5–10)

#	Date	Opponent	Score	Win	Loss	Save	Stadium	Attendance	Record	Report
52	June 1	Mets					**Candlestick Park**			
53	June 2	Mets					**Candlestick Park**			
54	June 4	Phillies					**Candlestick Park**			
55	June 5	Phillies					**Candlestick Park**			
56	June 6	Phillies					**Candlestick Park**			
57	June 6	Phillies					**Candlestick Park**			
58	June 8	@ Expos					Jarry Park Stadium			
59	June 9	@ Expos					Jarry Park Stadium			
60	June 10	@ Expos					Jarry Park Stadium			
61	June 11	@ Mets					Shea Stadium			
62	June 12	@ Mets					Shea Stadium			
63	June 13	@ Mets					Shea Stadium			
64	June 14	@ Phillies					Veterans Stadium			
65	June 15	@ Phillies					Veterans Stadium			
66	June 16	@ Phillies					Veterans Stadium			
67	June 18	Padres					**Candlestick Park**			
68	June 18	Padres					**Candlestick Park**			
69	June 19	Padres					**Candlestick Park**			
70	June 20	Padres					**Candlestick Park**			
71	June 20	Padres					**Candlestick Park**			
72	June 22	Cubs					**Candlestick Park**			
73	June 23	Cubs					**Candlestick Park**			
74	June 25	@ Astros					Astrodome			
75	June 26	@ Astros					Astrodome			
76	June 27	@ Astros					Astrodome			
77	June 28	@ Padres					San Diego Stadium			
78	June 29	@ Padres					San Diego Stadium			
79	June 30	@ Padres					San Diego Stadium			

July (15–14) (Home: 8–9; Road: 7–5)

#	Date	Opponent	Score	Win	Loss	Save	Stadium	Attendance	Record	Report
80	July 1	Cardinals					**Candlestick Park**			
81	July 2	Cardinals					**Candlestick Park**			
82	July 3	Cardinals					**Candlestick Park**			
83	July 4	Dodgers					**Candlestick Park**			
84	July 5	Dodgers					**Candlestick Park**			
85	July 6	Astros					**Candlestick Park**			
86	July 7	Astros					**Candlestick Park**			
87	July 8	Astros					**Candlestick Park**			
88	July 9	@ Dodgers					Dodger Stadium			
89	July 10	@ Dodgers					Dodger Stadium			
90	July 11	@ Dodgers					Dodger Stadium			
91	July 15	@ Reds					Riverfront Stadium			
92	July 16	@ Reds					Riverfront Stadium			
93	July 17	@ Reds					Riverfront Stadium			
94	July 18	@ Braves					Atlanta Stadium			
95	July 18	@ Braves					Atlanta Stadium			
96	July 19	@ Braves					Atlanta Stadium			
97	July 20	@ Pirates					Three Rivers Stadium			
98	July 21	@ Pirates					Three Rivers Stadium			
99	July 22	@ Pirates					Three Rivers Stadium			
100	July 23	Reds					**Candlestick Park**			
101	July 24	Reds					**Candlestick Park**			
102	July 25	Reds					**Candlestick Park**			
103	July 25	Reds					**Candlestick Park**			
104	July 27	Braves					**Candlestick Park**			
105	July 28	Braves					**Candlestick Park**			
106	July 29	Braves					**Candlestick Park**			
107	July 30	Pirates					**Candlestick Park**			
108	July 31	Pirates					**Candlestick Park**			

August (14–13) (Home: 9–3; Road: 5–10)

#	Date	Opponent	Score	Win	Loss	Save	Stadium	Attendance	Record	Report
109	August 1	Pirates					**Candlestick Park**			
110	August 1	Pirates					**Candlestick Park**			
111	August 2	Dodgers					**Candlestick Park**			
112	August 3	Dodgers					**Candlestick Park**			
113	August 4	@ Cardinals					Busch Memorial Stadium			
114	August 5	@ Cardinals					Busch Memorial Stadium			
115	August 6	@ Cardinals					Busch Memorial Stadium			
116	August 7	@ Cubs					Wrigley Field			
117	August 8	@ Cubs					Wrigley Field			
118	August 8	@ Cubs					Wrigley Field			
119	August 10	Expos					**Candlestick Park**			
120	August 11	Expos					**Candlestick Park**			
121	August 13	Mets					**Candlestick Park**			
122	August 14	Mets					**Candlestick Park**			
123	August 15	Mets					**Candlestick Park**			
124	August 17	Phillies					**Candlestick Park**			
125	August 18	Phillies					**Candlestick Park**			
126	August 20	@ Expos					Jarry Park Stadium			
127	August 21	@ Expos					Jarry Park Stadium			
128	August 22	@ Expos					Jarry Park Stadium			
129	August 23	@ Mets					Shea Stadium			
130	August 24	@ Mets					Shea Stadium			
131	August 25	@ Mets					Shea Stadium			
132	August 28	@ Phillies					Veterans Stadium			
133	August 28	@ Phillies					Veterans Stadium			
134	August 29	@ Phillies					Veterans Stadium			
135	August 31	Braves					**Candlestick Park**			

September (11–16) (Home: 5–7; Road: 6–9)

#	Date	Opponent	Score	Win	Loss	Save	Stadium	Attendance	Record	Report
136	September 1	Braves					**Candlestick Park**			
137	September 3	Astros					**Candlestick Park**			
138	September 4	Astros					**Candlestick Park**			
139	September 5	Astros					**Candlestick Park**			
140	September 5	Astros					**Candlestick Park**			
141	September 6	@ Dodgers					Dodger Stadium			
142	September 7	@ Dodgers					Dodger Stadium			
143	September 8	@ Dodgers					Dodger Stadium			
144	September 10	@ Braves					Atlanta Stadium			
145	September 11	@ Braves					Atlanta Stadium			
146	September 12	@ Braves					Atlanta Stadium			
147	September 13	Dodgers					**Candlestick Park**			
148	September 14	Dodgers					**Candlestick Park**			
149	September 15	Reds					**Candlestick Park**			
150	September 16	Reds					**Candlestick Park**			
151	September 17	Padres					**Candlestick Park**			
152	September 18	Padres					**Candlestick Park**			
153	September 19	Padres					**Candlestick Park**			
154	September 21	@ Astros					Astrodome			
155	September 22	@ Astros					Astrodome			
156	September 23	@ Astros					Astrodome			
157	September 24	@ Reds					Riverfront Stadium			
158	September 25	@ Reds					Riverfront Stadium			
159	September 26	@ Reds					Riverfront Stadium			
160	September 28	@ Padres					San Diego Stadium			
161	September 29	@ Padres					San Diego Stadium			
162	September 30	@ Padres					San Diego Stadium			

=== Postseason ===
1971 Postseason Game Log
National League Championship Series (1–3)

Game	Date	Opponent	Score	Win	Loss	Save	Stadium	Attendance	Series	Report
1 NLCS	October 2	Pirates	5–4	**Perry** (1–0)	Blass (0–1)		**Candlestick Park**	40,977	1–0	W1
2 NLCS	October 3	Pirates	4–9	Ellis (1–0)	**Cumberland** (0–1)		**Candlestick Park**	42,562	1–1	L1
3 NLCS	October 5	@ Pirates	1–2	Johnson (1–0)	**Marichal** (0–1)	Giusti (1)	Three Rivers Stadium	38,222	1–2	L2
4 NLCS	October 6	@ Pirates	5–9	Kison (1–0)	**Perry** (1–1)		Three Rivers Stadium	35,487	1–3	L3

=== Roster ===
1971 San Francisco Giants
**Roster**
**Pitchers**: 33 Jim Barr; 32 Ron Bryant; 30 Don Carrithers; 40 John Cumberland; 38 Steve Hamilton; 35 Jerry Johnson; 27 Juan Marichal; 47 Don McMahon; 36 Gaylord Perry; 39 Frank Reberger; 45 Rich Robertson; 33 Steve Stone; 19 Jim Willoughby	**Catchers**: 2 Dick Dietz; 18 Russ Gibson; 5 Fran Healy; 8 Dave Rader; **Infielders**: 31 Chris Arnold; 14 Frank Duffy; 23 Tito Fuentes; 10 Al Gallagher; 34 Ed Goodson; 16 Jim Ray Hart; 17 Bob Heise; 37 Frank Johnson; 45 Dave Kingman; 22 Hal Lanier; 44 Willie McCovey; 35 Chris Speier	**Outfielders**: 25 Bobby Bonds; 14 George Foster; 15 Ken Henderson; 37 Jim Howarth; 24 Willie Mays; 43 Jimmy Rosario; 26 Floyd Wicker; 20 Bernie Williams	**Manager**: 7 Charlie Fox; **Coaches**: 46 Larry Jansen; 1 John McNamara; 3 Ozzie Virgil; 9 Wes Westrum

== Player stats ==
= Indicates team leader

=== Batting ===
==== Starters by position ====
Note: Pos = Position; G = Games played; AB = At bats; R = Runs scored; H = Hits; Avg. = Batting average; HR = Home runs; RBI = Runs batted in; SB = Stolen bases

Pos	Player	G	AB	R	H	Avg.	HR	RBI	SB
C	Dick Dietz	142	453	58	114	.252	19	72	1
1B	Willie McCovey	105	329	45	91	.277	18	70	0
2B	Tito Fuentes	152	630	63	172	.273	4	52	12
3B	Al Gallagher	136	429	47	119	.277	5	57	2
SS	Chris Speier	157	601	74	141	.235	8	46	4
LF	Ken Henderson	141	504	80	133	.264	15	65	18
CF	Willie Mays	136	417	82	113	.271	18	61	23
RF	Bobby Bonds	155	619	110	178	.288	33	102	26

==== Other batters ====
Note: G = Games played; AB = At bats; H = Hits; Avg. = Batting average; HR = Home runs; RBI = Runs batted in

Player	G	AB	H	Avg.	HR	RBI
Hal Lanier	109	206	48	.233	1	13
Jimmy Rosario	92	192	43	.224	0	13
Dave Kingman	41	115	32	.278	6	24
George Foster	36	105	28	.267	3	8
Fran Healy	47	93	26	.280	2	11
Bernie Williams	35	73	13	.178	1	5
Russ Gibson	25	57	11	.193	1	7
Frank Johnson	32	49	4	.082	0	5
Ed Goodson	20	42	8	.190	0	1
Jim Ray Hart	31	39	10	.256	2	5
Frank Duffy	21	28	5	.179	0	2
Floyd Wicker	9	21	3	.143	0	1
Chris Arnold	6	13	3	.231	1	3
Jim Howarth	7	13	3	.231	0	2
Bob Heise	13	11	0	.000	0	0
Dave Rader	3	4	0	.000	0	0

=== Pitching ===
==== Starting pitchers ====
Note: G = Games pitched; IP = Innings pitched; W = Wins; L = Losses; ERA = Earned run average; SO = Strikeouts

Player	G	IP	W	L	ERA	SO
Gaylord Perry	37	280.0	16	12	2.76	158
Juan Marichal	37	279.0	18	11	2.94	159
Ron Bryant	27	140.0	7	10	3.79	79
Steve Stone	24	110.2	5	9	4.16	63

==== Other pitchers ====
Note: G = Games pitched; IP = Innings pitched; W = Wins; L = Losses; ERA = Earned run average; SO = Strikeouts

Player	G	IP	W	L	ERA	SO
John Cumberland	45	185.0	9	6	2.92	65
Don Carrithers	22	80.1	5	3	4.03	41
Rich Robertson	23	61.0	2	2	4.57	32
Frank Reberger	13	43.2	3	0	3.92	21
Jim Willoughby	2	4.0	0	1	9.00	3

==== Relief pitchers ====
Note: G = Games pitched; W = Wins; L = Losses; SV = Saves; ERA = Earned run average; SO = Strikeouts

Player	G	W	L	SV	ERA	SO
Jerry Johnson	67	12	9	18	2.97	85
Don McMahon	61	10	6	4	4.06	71
Steve Hamilton	39	2	2	4	3.02	38
Jim Barr	17	1	1	0	3.57	16

== National League Championship Series ==
The Pittsburgh Pirates win the series, 3–1, over the Giants.

Game	Score	Date	Location	Attendance
1	Pittsburgh – 4, San Francisco – 5	October 2	Candlestick Park	40,977
2	Pittsburgh – 9, San Francisco – 4	October 3	Candlestick Park	42,562
3	San Francisco – 1, Pittsburgh – 2	October 5	Three Rivers Stadium	38,322
4	San Francisco – 5, Pittsburgh – 9	October 6	Three Rivers Stadium	35,487

== Award winners ==
- Willie Mays, Commissioner's Award

== Farm system ==
Level	Team	League	Manager
AAA	Phoenix Giants	Pacific Coast League	Jim Davenport
AA	Amarillo Giants	Texas League	Andy Gilbert
A	Fresno Giants	California League	Dennis Sommers
A	Decatur Commodores	Midwest League	Frank Funk
Rookie	Great Falls Giants	Pioneer League	Dick Wilson

LEAGUE CHAMPIONS: Great Falls
