= 1971 Cincinnati Reds season =

1971 Cincinnati Reds
- League: National League
- Division: West
- Ballpark: Riverfront Stadium
- City: Cincinnati
- Record: 79–83 (.488)
- Divisional place: 4th
- Owners: Francis L. Dale
- General managers: Bob Howsam
- Managers: Sparky Anderson
- Television: WLWT (Tom Hedrick, Bob Waller)
- Radio: WLW (Al Michaels, Joe Nuxhall)

The 1971 Cincinnati Reds season was the 102nd season for the franchise in Major League Baseball, and their 2nd and first full season at Riverfront Stadium in Cincinnati. The defending National League champion Reds finished with 79 wins and 83 losses, tied for fourth with the Houston Astros in the National League West, eleven games behind the division champion San Francisco Giants. The Reds were managed by Sparky Anderson, and played their first full season of home games at Riverfront Stadium, which had opened at mid-season in the previous year. This was the team's only losing season of the 1970s.

== Offseason ==
- October 20, 1970: Sonny Ruberto was sent to the Reds by the San Diego Padres in a conditional deal.
- March 31, 1971: Stan Swanson was traded by the Reds to the Montreal Expos for Jim Qualls.

== Regular season ==
=== Season standings ===
NL West
Team	W	L	Pct.	GB	Home	Road
San Francisco Giants	90	72	.556	—	51‍–‍30	39‍–‍42
Los Angeles Dodgers	89	73	.549	1	42‍–‍39	47‍–‍34
Atlanta Braves	82	80	.506	8	43‍–‍39	39‍–‍41
Cincinnati Reds	79	83	.488	11	46‍–‍35	33‍–‍48
Houston Astros	79	83	.488	11	39‍–‍42	40‍–‍41
San Diego Padres	61	100	.379	28½	33‍–‍48	28‍–‍52

=== Record vs. opponents ===
1971 National League record Sources:
Team	ATL	CHC	CIN	HOU	LAD	MON	NYM	PHI	PIT	SD	SF	STL
Atlanta	—	5–7	9–9	9–9	9–9	7–5	7–5	8–4	4–8	11–7	7–11	6–6
Chicago	7–5	—	6–6	5–7	8–4	8–10	11–7	11–7	6–12	9–3	3–9	9–9
Cincinnati	9–9	6–6	—	5–13	7–11	7–5	8–4	5–7	5–7	10–8	9–9	8–4
Houston	9–9	7–5	13–5	—	8–10	4–8	5–7	8–4	4–8	10–8	9–9	2–10
Los Angeles	9–9	4–8	11–7	10–8	—	8–4	5–7	7–5	4–8	13–5	12–6	6–6
Montreal	5–7	10–8	5–7	8–4	4–8	—	9–9	6–12	7–11	6–5	7–5	4–14
New York	5–7	7–11	4–8	7–5	7–5	9–9	—	13–5	10–8	7–5	4–8	10–8
Philadelphia	4-8	7–11	2–10	3–9	5–7	6–10	5–13	—	6–12	4–8	6–6	7–11
Pittsburgh	8–4	12–6	7–5	8–4	8–4	11–7	8–10	12–6	—	9–3	3–9	11–7
San Diego	7–11	3–9	8–10	8–10	5–13	5–6	5–7	8–4	3–9	—	5–13	4–8
San Francisco	11–7	9–3	9–9	9–9	6–12	5–7	8–4	6–6	9–3	13–5	—	5–7
St. Louis	6–6	9–9	4–8	10–2	6–6	14–4	8–10	11–7	7–11	8–4	7–5	—

=== Notable transactions ===
- May 29, 1971: Frank Duffy and Vern Geishert were traded by the Reds to the San Francisco Giants for George Foster.
- June 8, 1971: Dave Revering was drafted by the Reds in the 7th round of the 1971 Major League Baseball draft.

=== Roster ===
1971 Cincinnati Reds
Roster
Pitchers: 42 Steve Blateric; 34 Pedro Borbón; 36 Clay Carroll; 40 Tony Cloninger; 47 Greg Garrett; 39 Joe Gibbon; 37 Wayne Granger; 48 Ross Grimsley; 35 Don Gullett; 31 Jim McGlothlin; 30 Jim Merritt; 38 Gary Nolan; 45 Wayne Simpson; 44 Ed Sprague; 43 Milt Wilcox	Catchers: 5 Johnny Bench; 7 Pat Corrales; 9 Bill Plummer; Infielders: 12 Darrel Chaney; 13 Dave Concepción; 15 Frank Duffy; 19 Tommy Helms; 23 Lee May; 24 Tony Pérez; 20 Willie Smith; 6 Woody Woodward	Outfielders: 29 Buddy Bradford; 25 Bernie Carbo; 17 Ty Cline; 22 Al Ferrara; 15 George Foster; 11 Hal McRae; 14 Pete Rose; 16 Jimmy Stewart; Other batters: 22 Ángel Bravo	Manager: 10 Sparky Anderson; Coaches: 2 Alex Grammas; 18 Ted Kluszewski; 3 George Scherger; 4 Larry Shepard

== Player stats ==
=== Batting ===
==== Starters by position ====
Note: Pos = Position; G = Games played; AB = At bats; H = Hits; Avg. = Batting average; HR = Home runs; RBI = Runs batted in

Pos	Player	G	AB	H	Avg.	HR	RBI
C	Johnny Bench	149	562	134	.238	27	61
1B	Lee May	147	553	154	.278	39	98
2B	Tommy Helms	150	547	141	.258	3	52
SS	Dave Concepción	130	327	67	.205	1	20
3B	Tony Pérez	158	609	164	.269	25	91
LF	Bernie Carbo	106	310	68	.219	5	20
CF	George Foster	104	368	86	.234	10	50
RF	Pete Rose	160	632	192	.304	13	44

==== Other batters ====
Note: G = Games played; AB = At bats; H = Hits; Avg. = Batting average; HR = Home runs; RBI = Runs batted in

Player	G	AB	H	Avg.	HR	RBI
Hal McRae	99	337	89	.264	9	34
Woody Woodward	136	273	66	.242	0	18
Buddy Bradford	79	100	20	.200	2	12
Ty Cline	69	97	19	.196	0	1
Pat Corrales	40	94	17	.181	0	6
Jimmy Stewart	80	82	19	.232	0	9
Willie Smith	31	55	9	.164	1	4
Al Ferrara	32	33	6	.182	1	5
Darrel Chaney	10	24	3	.125	0	1
Bill Plummer	10	19	0	.000	0	0
Frank Duffy	13	16	3	.188	0	1
Ángel Bravo	5	5	1	.200	0	0

=== Pitching ===
==== Starting pitchers ====
Note: G = Games pitched; IP = Innings pitched; W = Wins; L = Losses; ERA = Earned run average; SO = Strikeouts

Player	G	IP	W	L	ERA	SO
Gary Nolan	35	244.2	12	15	3.16	146
Don Gullett	35	217.2	16	6	2.65	107
Jim McGlothlin	30	170.2	8	12	3.22	93
Ross Grimsley	26	161.1	10	7	3.57	67
Wayne Simpson	22	117.1	4	7	4.76	61

==== Other pitchers ====
Note: G = Games pitched; IP = Innings pitched; W = Wins; L = Losses; ERA = Earned run average; SO = Strikeouts

Player	G	IP	W	L	ERA	SO
Jim Merritt	28	107.0	1	11	4.37	38
Tony Cloninger	28	97.1	3	6	3.38	51
Milt Wilcox	18	43.1	2	2	3.32	21
Greg Garrett	2	8.2	0	1	1.04	2

==== Relief pitchers ====
Note: G = Games pitched; W = Wins; L = Losses; SV = Saves; ERA = Earned run average; SO = Strikeouts

Player	G	W	L	SV	ERA	SO
Clay Carroll	61	10	4	15	2.50	64
Wayne Granger	70	7	6	11	3.33	51
Joe Gibbon	50	5	6	11	2.94	34
Ed Sprague Sr.	7	1	0	0	0.00	7
Pedro Borbón	3	0	0	0	4.15	4
Steve Blateric	2	0	0	0	13.50	4

== Farm system ==
Level	Team	League	Manager
AAA	Indianapolis Indians	American Association	Vern Rapp
AA	Trois-Rivières Aigles	Eastern League	Jim Snyder
A	Tampa Tarpons	Florida State League	Russ Nixon
A-Short Season	Sioux Falls Packers	Northern League	Dave Pavlesic
Rookie	GCL Reds	Gulf Coast League	Ron Plaza
