= 1971 Houston Astros season =

Tenth season in Major League Baseball for the Houston Astros

1971 Houston Astros
- League: National League
- Division: West
- Ballpark: Astrodome
- City: Houston, Texas
- Record: 79–83 (.488)
- Divisional place: 4th–tied
- Owners: Roy Hofheinz
- General managers: Spec Richardson
- Managers: Harry Walker
- Television: KTRK-TV
- Radio: KPRC (AM) (Gene Elston, Loel Passe)

The 1971 Houston Astros season was the tenth season for the Major League Baseball (MLB) franchise located in Houston, Texas, their seventh as the Astros, tenth in the National League (NL), third in the NL West division, and seventh at The Astrodome. The Astros entered the season having posted a record of 79–83, for fourth place and 23 games behind the division-champion and NL pennant-winning Cincinnati Reds.

Pitcher Larry Dierker made his third Opening Day start for the Astros, who hosted the Los Angeles Dodgers on April 5, and won, 5–2. The Astros' first-round selection in the amateur draft was shortstop Neil Rasmussen, at 12th overall.

Dierker and fellow pitcher Don Wilson both represented the Astros and played for the National League at the MLB All-Star Game. This was second career selection for Dierker and first for Wilson.

The Astros concluded the season with a record of 79–83—replicating their performance from the year prior—while maintaining fourth place in the NL West, this time, tying with Cincinnati for 11 games behind the division-champion San Francisco Giants. The Astros played 75 games that were decided by a one-run margin, which is an all-time MLB record. In those games, the Astros performed to a 32–43 (.427) record. Following the season, third baseman Doug Rader won his second career Gold Glove Award.

== Offseason ==
=== Summary ===
The Houston Astros concluded the 1970 season with a 79–83 (.488) record, for fourth place and 23 games behind the NL West division-champion and NL pennant-winning Cincinnati Reds. Houston set then-club records with 744 runs scored and 129 home runs, including five grand slams. Second baseman Joe Morgan became first player in club history to record two 40-stolen base seasons. (Note: Number of players that meet criteria in a season, playing for HOU, in the regular season, requiring stolen bases ≥ 40, sorted by ascending instances.) Third baseman Doug Rader won the Gold Glove Award for the first time, joining pitcher Bobby Shantz in 1962 as the second Houston Colt 45/Astro to be so recognized.

=== Transactions ===
- January 13, 1971: Doug Konieczny was drafted by the Astros in the 1st round (4th pick) of the 1971 Major League Baseball draft Secondary Phase.

=== Exhibition play ===
The Astrodome hosted a 15-inning, exhibition tripleheader on April 2 between Houston, the Minnesota Twins and New York Yankees. For the first five-inning contest, the Astros tripped the Yankees, 2–1. During the middle five, the Twins toppled the Yankees, 4–1, prior to getting ripped by the Astros during the last five frames, 5–3.

== Regular season ==
=== Summary ===
==== April ====
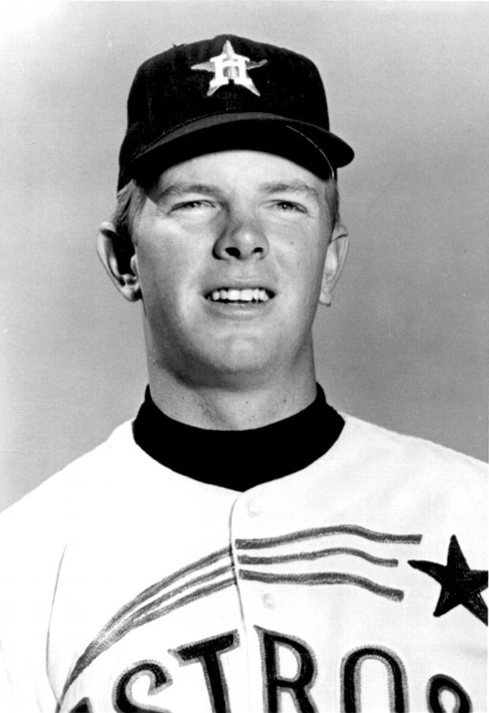
Larry Dierker, c. 1966, Opening Day starting pitcher.

Opening Day starting lineup
Uniform	Player	Position
28	César Cedeño	Center fielder
18	Joe Morgan	Second baseman
24	Jimmy Wynn	Right fielder
27	Bob Watson	Left fielder
11	Denis Menke	First baseman
12	Doug Rader	Third baseman
7	Johnny Edwards	Catcher
15	Roger Metzger	Shortstop
49	Larry Dierker	Pitcher
Venue: Astrodome • Final: Houston 5, Los Angeles 2 Sources:

Hosting the Los Angeles Dodgers for Opening Day on April 5, Denis Menke tripled in runs (RBI) of Joe Morgan and Bob Watson off Los Angeles' Bill Singer for a 2–0 lead. The Astros never looked back, winning 5–2, backed by complete game execution from Larry Dierker. Dierker diffused 10 hits, issued one base on balls and struck out four. Making his third Opening Day start for the Astros, Dierker at the time remained the only pitcher to start more than once on Opening Day for the club.

On April 20, Rich Chiles made his major league debut, He pinch hit for starting pitcher Tom Griffin but Cubs pitcher Ferguson Jenkins induced Chiles to line out into a double play in his first plate appearance in the top of the eighth inning. The Chicago Cubs held on to a 3–1 over Houston.

On April 28, César Gerónimo chipped in a walk-off triple, just the second in club history. This scored Jim Wynn during the bottom of the tenth frame for a decision of Houston 4, Philadelphia Phillies 3. (Note: The first walk-off triple was prosecuted by Bob Aspromonte on Opening Day, April 10, 1968.) Rader drove in six, and Larry Dierker (6–1) earned the win and quality start spite of yielding 13 hits in six innngs,

==== May ====
On May 16, Doug Rader hit a record third career grand slam inside the Astrodome—which would be matched by one other player during its 35 years of hosting baseball. (Note: By Ken Caminiti on August 31, 1999.) At that point, Rader had been the only player to hit more than one in the Astrodome. Larry Dierker (6–1) earned the victory and quality start, escaping 13 hits surrendered over six innings. The Astros won, 12–4, while Dierker himself collected two hits at the plate. Jim Ray (1) pitched the final three innings to earn the save.

During a doubleheader on May 26 at San Diego Stadium, the Padres started Al Santorini for both contests, though during the first game, Santorini was deployed as an opener. Facing an order assembled with seven lefties, Santorini got the leadoff hitter out and was replaced by Dave Roberts. The Astros won, 2–1, behind Wade Blasingame's effort. Bob Watson pinch hit for Blasingame (3–5) in the top of the ninth and singled home Doug Rader for the game-winning run.

In the May 26 nightcap, Larry Dierker cruised to his first career one-hitter while outpitching Santorini–who, this time, hurled six innings–in an 8–0 Astros triumph. Ollie Brown's broken-bat single in the seventh foiled Dierker's bid for a no-hitter. Dierker issued three base on balls and struck out five to earn a game score of 87. Catcher Johnny Edwards tripled and collected three runs batted in (RBI). The Astros piled on 11 hits and worked 6 walks. It was also Dierker's fourth career complete game effort of two hits or fewer.

==== June ====
On June 6, for the first time in club history, the Astros logged 10 extra-base hits in a single game. (Note: Subsequently matched multiple times, next on June 14, 1992. Remained club record until September 9, 2000. For single games, from 1901 to 2025, For HOU, in the regular season, requiring extra base hits ≥ 10, sorted by ascending date.) Though Astros stacked eight doubles and two home runs, they fell short to the Pittsburgh Pirates, 9–8. Bob Watson homered (4), doubled (9) and collected four RBI. John Mayberry (2) also homered. Jesús Alou doubled twice, while Jack Hiatt, Doug Rader, and Johnny Edwards also doubled.

==== July ====
The Astros exploded for a season-high 18 runs on July 7, en route to an 18–4 drubbing of the San Francisco Giants at Candlestick Park. Jimmy Wynn became the first player to attain 1,000 hits as a member the Houston Astros, also the 1,000th hit of his career, with a seventh inning double off left-hander Steve Hamilton. During an all-round memorable day, Wynn was 2-for-4 with 2 runs batted in (RBI), 2 runs scored, one stolen base and one base on balls.

On July 16, the Astros executed the first triple play in franchise history—and first at the Astrodome—during the top of the third inning, (Note: The Mets had turned the first triple play against Houston on April 15, 1965.) capping a 9–4 triumph over Nolan Ryan and the New York Mets. Shortstop Roger Metzger scooped a tapper hit by Cleon Jones, stepped on second base to force out Tommie Agee, then tossed to Denis Menke at first base ahead of Jones for the putout. Menke then fired to Doug Rader after Ken Boswell hesitated on his dash to third base, where Rader completed the trifecta. The Astros scored three in the bottom of the first inning, and once each every inning through the fifth. Metzer scored three times and Bob Watson had three this. Jack Billingham (5–8) worked 8 1/3 innings to earn the win.

==== September ====
On September 2, César Cedeño hit the first Inside-the-park grand slam at the Astrodome, one of two all-time. (Note: The second was hit by Tony Womack of the Arizona Diamondbacks on July 21, 1999.) He stepped to the plate to face Claude Osteen with the bases loaded in the fifth in a 3–2 deficit to the Los Angeles Dodgers, and hit a blooper to shallow right field between Bill Buckner and Jim Lefebvre. They while attempting to make the catch, and the ball dribbled into the corner. Meanwhile, the bases cleared ahead of Cedeño, who raced home for the 170 feet (52 m) inside the-park grand slam. The first of his career, Cedeño had blasted his first major league home run off Osteen on July 6 of the prior year. On the day, Cedeño was 3-for-4 with 4 RBI and a double. Astros starter Don Wilson (13–8) went the distance to pick up the victory, a 9–3 score.

==== Strikeout records in a doubleheader: J. R. Richard's 15-strikeout debut ====
Astros pitching fired a record performance on September 5 during a doubleheader at Candlestick Park. In the opener, Jack Billingham tossed a five-hit, 1–0 shutout with 11 strikeouts and a game score of 86 over the Giants. Making his major league debut during the second game on September 5, J. R. Richard struck out 15 Giants on the way to firing another complete game. Richard's final strikeout victim was Hal Lanier, also the final out of the contest, to finish off a 5–3 Astros triumph. This contest garnered a 75-game score for Richard. His 15-strikeout effort remained his permanent career-high, (Note: Richard subsequently matched his 15-strikeout performance twice during the 1979 campaign, on August 3 and September 21.) while tying a record for a Major League debut first established in 1954 by Karl Spooner of the Brooklyn Dodgers. The 26 combined strikeouts by Billingham and Richard during the twinbill set a new MLB record.

==== Rest of September ====
Facing a 4–1 deficit to the Atlanta Braves on September 15, manager Harry Walker inserted right-handed prospect Larry Yount to pitch the ninth inning. His major league debut, Félix Millán was the first batter of the inning. Before he could throw his first pitch, Yount's elbow became sore, whom Walker replaced with veteran Jim Ray. Yount, who never made another major league appearance, became the first to appear in a game without any officially scored plays being completed. Atlanta prevailed over Houston, 4 to 2, led by Phil Niekro (14–12), who tossed a four-hit complete game, defeating Houston's Jack Billingham (8–15). Billingham surrendered Hank Aaron's 44th home run of the season.

The Astros turned their second triple play of the season on September 17, during the second inning while hosting the Cincinnati Reds.

On September 24, Ken Forsch established an individual club record by working 13 innings. Forsch surrendered six hits, one run, and struck out eight. (Note: Don Wilson matched the record with a 13-inning complete game on September 7, 1972.)

==== Performance overview ====
With a 79–83 (.488) record, Houston terminated the 1971 campaign tied for fourth place in the NL West with the Cincinnati, 11 games behind the division-champion San Francisco Giants. The Astros participated in 75 contests that were decided by a one-run margin, which set an all-time MLB record. In those games, the team had a record of 32–43 (.427).

Third baseman Doug Rader, who won his second consecutive Gold Glove Award, became the first Astros player to win more than once.

As the Astrodome was reputed for suppressing the home run, three Astros combined to lead the league in extra-base hit categories. With 40 doubles, César Cedeño led the major leagues. He joined Rusty Staub in 1967 as the second Astro to lead both theNatioal League in doubles as well as all of baseball. Meanwhile, Houston's first-ever triples leaders—Roger Metzger and Joe Morgan jointly led the major leagues with 11 each—forged a three-way tie with Freddie Patek of the Kansas City Royals in the American League.

Joe Morgan furthered club stolen base records by becoming the first individual player club history to attain 40 or more over three seasons, each consecutively. This was also the third of a franchise-record nine successive campaigns featuring at least one baserunner with 40 or more stolen bases.

Don Wilson became the first Astros pitcher to lead the NL in hits per nine innings (6.549 H/9).

=== League standings ===
NL West
Team	W	L	Pct.	GB	Home	Road
San Francisco Giants	90	72	.556	—	51‍–‍30	39‍–‍42
Los Angeles Dodgers	89	73	.549	1	42‍–‍39	47‍–‍34
Atlanta Braves	82	80	.506	8	43‍–‍39	39‍–‍41
Cincinnati Reds	79	83	.488	11	46‍–‍35	33‍–‍48
Houston Astros	79	83	.488	11	39‍–‍42	40‍–‍41
San Diego Padres	61	100	.379	28½	33‍–‍48	28‍–‍52

=== Record versus opponents ===
National League

1971 National League record Sources:
Team	ATL	CHC	CIN	HOU	LAD	MON	NYM	PHI	PIT	SD	SF	STL
Atlanta	—	5–7	9–9	9–9	9–9	7–5	7–5	8–4	4–8	11–7	7–11	6–6
Chicago	7–5	—	6–6	5–7	8–4	8–10	11–7	11–7	6–12	9–3	3–9	9–9
Cincinnati	9–9	6–6	—	5–13	7–11	7–5	8–4	5–7	5–7	10–8	9–9	8–4
Houston	9–9	7–5	13–5	—	8–10	4–8	5–7	8–4	4–8	10–8	9–9	2–10
Los Angeles	9–9	4–8	11–7	10–8	—	8–4	5–7	7–5	4–8	13–5	12–6	6–6
Montreal	5–7	10–8	5–7	8–4	4–8	—	9–9	6–12	7–11	6–5	7–5	4–14
New York	5–7	7–11	4–8	7–5	7–5	9–9	—	13–5	10–8	7–5	4–8	10–8
Philadelphia	4-8	7–11	2–10	3–9	5–7	6–10	5–13	—	6–12	4–8	6–6	7–11
Pittsburgh	8–4	12–6	7–5	8–4	8–4	11–7	8–10	12–6	—	9–3	3–9	11–7
San Diego	7–11	3–9	8–10	8–10	5–13	5–6	5–7	8–4	3–9	—	5–13	4–8
San Francisco	11–7	9–3	9–9	9–9	6–12	5–7	8–4	6–6	9–3	13–5	—	5–7
St. Louis	6–6	9–9	4–8	10–2	6–6	14–4	8–10	11–7	7–11	8–4	7–5	—

=== Notable transactions ===
- June 8, 1971: 1971 Major League Baseball draft
  - Paul Siebert was drafted by the Astros in the 3rd round.
  - Rich Troedson was drafted by the Astros in the 1st round (8th pick) of the Secondary Phase, but did not sign.

=== Roster ===
1971 Houston Astros
Roster
Pitchers: 42 Jack Billingham; 36 Wade Blasingame; 41 Ron Cook; 39 George Culver; 49 Larry Dierker; 43 Ken Forsch; 48 Fred Gladding; 44 Bill Greif; 38 Tom Griffin; 35 Skip Guinn; 46 Buddy Harris; 23 Denny Lemaster; 45 Jim Ray; 50 J. R. Richard; 37 Scipio Spinks; 40 Don Wilson; 31 Larry Yount	Catchers: 7 Johnny Edwards; 8 Jack Hiatt; 10 Larry Howard; Infielders: 16 Ray Busse; 14 Marty Martínez; 33 John Mayberry; 11 Denis Menke; 15 Roger Metzger; 18 Joe Morgan; 12 Doug Rader; 19 Derrel Thomas	Outfielders: 22 Jesús Alou; 28 César Cedeño; 29 Rich Chiles; 20 César Gerónimo; 21 Norm Miller; 17 Jay Schlueter; 27 Bob Watson; 24 Jimmy Wynn	Manager: 25 Harry Walker; Coaches: 4 Buddy Hancken; 3 Hub Kittle; 5 Jim Owens; 2 Salty Parker

== Player stats ==
=== Batting ===
==== Starters by position ====
Note: Pos = Position; G = Games played; AB = At bats; H = Hits; Avg. = Batting average; HR = Home runs; RBI = Runs batted in

Pos	Player	G	AB	H	Avg.	HR	RBI
C	Johnny Edwards	106	317	74	.233	1	23
1B	Denis Menke	146	475	117	.246	1	43
2B	Joe Morgan	160	583	149	.256	13	56
SS	Roger Metzger	150	562	132	.235	0	26
3B	Doug Rader	135	484	118	.244	12	56
LF	Bob Watson	129	468	135	.288	9	67
CF	César Cedeño	161	611	161	.264	10	81
RF	Jimmy Wynn	123	404	82	.203	7	45

==== Other batters ====
Note: G = Games played; AB = At bats; H = Hits; Avg. = Batting average; HR = Home runs; RBI = Runs batted in

Player	G	AB	H	Avg.	HR	RBI
Jesús Alou	122	433	121	.279	2	40
Jack Hiatt	69	174	48	.276	1	16
John Mayberry	46	137	25	.182	7	14
Rich Chiles	67	119	27	.227	2	15
César Gerónimo	94	82	18	.220	1	6
Norm Miller	45	74	19	.257	2	10
Larry Howard	24	64	15	.234	2	14
Marty Martínez	32	62	16	.258	0	4
Ray Busse	10	34	5	.147	0	4
Derrel Thomas	5	5	0	.000	0	0
Jay Schlueter	7	3	1	.333	0	0

=== Pitching ===
==== Starting pitchers ====
Note: G = Games pitched; IP = Innings pitched; W = Wins; L = Losses; ERA = Earned run average; SO = Strikeouts

Player	G	IP	W	L	ERA	SO
Don Wilson	35	268.0	16	10	2.45	180
Jack Billingham	33	228.1	10	16	3.39	139
Ken Forsch	33	188.1	8	8	2.53	131
Larry Dierker	24	159.0	12	6	2.72	91
Wade Blasingame	30	158.1	9	11	4.60	93
Ron Cook	5	25.2	0	4	4.91	10
J.R. Richard	4	21.0	2	1	3.43	29

==== Other pitchers ====
Note: G = Games pitched; IP = Innings pitched; W = Wins; L = Losses; ERA = Earned run average; SO = Strikeouts

Player	G	IP	W	L	ERA	SO
Tom Griffin	10	37.2	0	6	4.78	29
Scipio Spinks	5	29.1	1	0	3.68	26
Bill Greif	7	16.0	1	1	5.06	14

==== Relief pitchers ====
Note: G = Games pitched; W = Wins; L = Losses; SV = Saves; ERA = Earned run average; SO = Strikeouts

Player	G	W	L	SV	ERA	SO
Fred Gladding	48	4	5	12	2.10	17
George Culver	59	5	8	7	2.64	57
Jim Ray	47	10	4	3	2.12	46
Denny Lemaster	42	0	2	2	3.45	28
Buddy Harris	20	1	1	0	6.46	21
Skip Guinn	4	0	0	1	0.00	3
Larry Yount	1	0	0	0	----	0

== Awards and achievements ==
=== Grand slams ===
No.	Date	Astros batter	Venue	Inning	Pitcher	Opposing team	Box
1	May 16	Doug Rader	Astrodome	1 (Note: Tied score or took lead)	Jerry Reuss	St. Louis Cardinals	
2	September 2	César Cedeño (Note: 1st MLB grand slam)	Astrodome (Note: Inside-the-park)	5	Claude Osteen	Los Angeles Dodgers	

=== Awards ===
1971 Houston Astros award winners
Name of award		Recipient	Ref.
Baseball Digest Rookie All-Star	Shortstop	Roger Metzger	
Houston Astros Most Valuable Player (MVP)		Don Wilson	
Gold Glove Award	Third baseman	Doug Rader	
MLB All-Star Game	Reserve pitcher	Larry Dierker	
MLB All-Star Game	Reserve pitcher	Don Wilson	

=== League leaders ===
NL batting leaders

- Doubles: César Cedeño (40—led MLB)
- Triples: Roger Metzger & Joe Morgan (11—tied, led MLB) (Note: Tied with Freddie Patek of the Kansas City Royals of the American League.)

NL pitching leaders

- Hit by pitch: Jack Billingham (16—led MLB)
- Hits per nine innings (H/9): Don Wilson (6.549)

=== Milestones ===
==== Major League debuts ====
Player—Appeared at position

- Rich Chiles, pinch hitter
- J. R. Richard, starting pitcher
- Larry Yount, relief pitcher
Date and opponent

- April 20 at Chicago
- September 5 at San Francisco
- September 15 vs Atlanta
Box

Also:

== Minor league system ==
Level	Team	League	Manager
AAA	Oklahoma City 89ers	American Association	Jimmy Williams
AA	Columbus Astros	Southern League	Clifford Davis
A	Cocoa Astros	Florida State League	Tony Pacheco
A	Sumter Astros	Western Carolinas League	Jackie Brandt
Rookie	Covington Astros	Appalachian League	Billy Smith

== See also ==
- List of Major League Baseball annual doubles leaders
- List of Major League Baseball annual triples leaders
