= Jay Schlueter =

American baseball player (1949-2010)

- Outfielder
- Born: July 31, 1949; Phoenix, Arizona, U.S.
- Died: May 13, 2010 (aged 60); Phoenix, Arizona, U.S.
- Batted: Right Threw: Right

MLB debut
- June 18, 1971, for the Houston Astros

Last MLB appearance
- July 25, 1971, for the Houston Astros

MLB statistics
- Batting average: .333
- Home runs: 0
- Runs batted in: 0

Teams
- Houston Astros (1971)

Jay D. Schlueter (July 31, 1949 – May 13, 2010) was an American professional baseball player. He played in Major League Baseball as an outfielder during the 1971 season for the Houston Astros. Listed at 6 ft 0 in (1.83 m), 182 lb., he batted and threw right-handed.

Born in Phoenix, Arizona, Schlueter was a second round selection in the 1967 MLB Draft by the Houston Astros out of Central High School (Phoenix, Arizona). He spent part of five seasons in the minor leagues before joining the big club in the 1971 midseason. Unfortunately, he formed part of a very congested Astros outfield that included César Cedeño, César Gerónimo, Jimmy Wynn and Bob Watson, among others. Schlueter went 1-for-3 and scored one run in seven games, but never returned to the majors. After that, he went to the minors for four more seasons. He was traded along with Lee May from the Astros to the Baltimore Orioles for Enos Cabell and Rob Andrews at the Winter Meetings on December 3, 1974. In a nine-year minors career, he posted a .209 average with 48 home runs and 128 runs batted in in 863 games.

Following his playing career, Schlueter became a dedicated coach and supporter of all youth and high school sports in Scottsdale, Arizona, and Chaparral, New Mexico. He later worked as a commercial real estate broker.

== See also ==
- 1971 Houston Astros season
