= Buddy Harris =

American baseball player (1948–2022)

- Pitcher
- Born: December 5, 1948; Philadelphia, Pennsylvania, U.S.
- Died: November 5, 2022 (aged 73); Philadelphia, Pennsylvania, U.S.
- Batted: Right Threw: Right

MLB debut
- September 10, 1970, for the Houston Astros

Last MLB appearance
- September 3, 1971, for the Houston Astros

MLB statistics
- Win–loss record: 1–1
- Earned run average: 6.32
- Innings pitched: 37
- Stats at Baseball Reference

Teams
- Houston Astros (1970–1971)

Walter Francis "Buddy" Harris (December 5, 1948 – November 5, 2022) was an American professional baseball player. A right-handed pitcher, he worked in 22 games as a relief pitcher for the 1970–1971 Houston Astros of Major League Baseball.

== Biography ==
Harris graduated from Roxborough High School in Philadelphia PA (where he excelled in basketball as well as baseball) and attended the University of Miami and Philadelphia University. He stood 6 feet 7 inches (2.01 m) tall and weighed 245 pounds (111 kg) during his active career.

Harris was selected by the Houston Astros in the first round (15th overall) of the secondary phase in the June 1968 Major League Baseball draft. He had three outstanding seasons in minor league baseball leading up to his first trial with the Astros in September 1970. He led the Rookie-level Appalachian League in strikeouts (1968), and posted sparkling 1.84 and 2.02 earned run averages in the Class A Carolina League (1969) and Double-A Southern League (1970). On his MLB debut, on September 10, 1970, he worked in two innings against the San Francisco Giants and surrendered a two-run home run to Willie Mays.

Harris made 20 appearances for the 1971 Astros, with one relief appearance in April and 19 from June through September sandwiched around 14 games with the Triple-A Oklahoma City 89ers. He split two decisions for Houston that year, giving up 33 hits and 16 bases on balls, with 21 strikeouts in 30 2/3 innings. In his penultimate MLB game, on September 1, 1971, he pitched 3 1/3 innings of hitless relief against the Los Angeles Dodgers at the Astrodome, notching six strikeouts. He was traded with Rich Chiles from the Astros to the New York Mets for Tommie Agee at the Winter Meetings on November 27, 1972. Arm problems curtailed his career, and he retired after the 1973 minor league season.
