= 1971 Chicago Cubs season =

1971 Chicago Cubs
- League: National League
- Division: East
- Ballpark: Wrigley Field
- City: Chicago
- Record: 83–79 (.512)
- Divisional place: 3rd
- Owners: Philip K. Wrigley
- General managers: John Holland
- Managers: Leo Durocher
- Television: WGN-TV (Jack Brickhouse, Jim West)
- Radio: WGN (Vince Lloyd, Lou Boudreau)
- Stats: ESPN.com; Baseball Reference

The 1971 Chicago Cubs season was the 100th season of the Chicago Cubs franchise, the 96th in the National League and the 56th at Wrigley Field. The Cubs finished third in the National League East with a record of 83–79.

== Offseason ==
- November 30, 1970: Hoyt Wilhelm was traded by the Cubs to the Atlanta Braves for Hal Breeden.
- December 3, 1970: Phil Gagliano was traded by the Cubs to the Boston Red Sox for Carmen Fanzone.

== Regular season ==
=== Season standings ===
NL East
| Team | W | L | Pct. | GB | Home | Road |
|---|---|---|---|---|---|---|
| Pittsburgh Pirates | 97 | 65 | .599 | — | 52‍–‍28 | 45‍–‍37 |
| St. Louis Cardinals | 90 | 72 | .556 | 7 | 45‍–‍36 | 45‍–‍36 |
| Chicago Cubs | 83 | 79 | .512 | 14 | 44‍–‍37 | 39‍–‍42 |
| New York Mets | 83 | 79 | .512 | 14 | 44‍–‍37 | 39‍–‍42 |
| Montreal Expos | 71 | 90 | .441 | 25½ | 36‍–‍44 | 35‍–‍46 |
| Philadelphia Phillies | 67 | 95 | .414 | 30 | 34‍–‍47 | 33‍–‍48 |

=== Record vs. opponents ===
1971 National League record Sources:
| Team | ATL | CHC | CIN | HOU | LAD | MON | NYM | PHI | PIT | SD | SF | STL |
|---|---|---|---|---|---|---|---|---|---|---|---|---|
| Atlanta | — | 5–7 | 9–9 | 9–9 | 9–9 | 7–5 | 7–5 | 8–4 | 4–8 | 11–7 | 7–11 | 6–6 |
| Chicago | 7–5 | — | 6–6 | 5–7 | 8–4 | 8–10 | 11–7 | 11–7 | 6–12 | 9–3 | 3–9 | 9–9 |
| Cincinnati | 9–9 | 6–6 | — | 5–13 | 7–11 | 7–5 | 8–4 | 5–7 | 5–7 | 10–8 | 9–9 | 8–4 |
| Houston | 9–9 | 7–5 | 13–5 | — | 8–10 | 4–8 | 5–7 | 8–4 | 4–8 | 10–8 | 9–9 | 2–10 |
| Los Angeles | 9–9 | 4–8 | 11–7 | 10–8 | — | 8–4 | 5–7 | 7–5 | 4–8 | 13–5 | 12–6 | 6–6 |
| Montreal | 5–7 | 10–8 | 5–7 | 8–4 | 4–8 | — | 9–9 | 6–12 | 7–11 | 6–5 | 7–5 | 4–14 |
| New York | 5–7 | 7–11 | 4–8 | 7–5 | 7–5 | 9–9 | — | 13–5 | 10–8 | 7–5 | 4–8 | 10–8 |
| Philadelphia | 4-8 | 7–11 | 2–10 | 3–9 | 5–7 | 6–10 | 5–13 | — | 6–12 | 4–8 | 6–6 | 7–11 |
| Pittsburgh | 8–4 | 12–6 | 7–5 | 8–4 | 8–4 | 11–7 | 8–10 | 12–6 | — | 9–3 | 3–9 | 11–7 |
| San Diego | 7–11 | 3–9 | 8–10 | 8–10 | 5–13 | 5–6 | 5–7 | 8–4 | 3–9 | — | 5–13 | 4–8 |
| San Francisco | 11–7 | 9–3 | 9–9 | 9–9 | 6–12 | 5–7 | 8–4 | 6–6 | 9–3 | 13–5 | — | 5–7 |
| St. Louis | 6–6 | 9–9 | 4–8 | 10–2 | 6–6 | 14–4 | 8–10 | 11–7 | 7–11 | 8–4 | 7–5 | — |

=== Notable transactions ===
- June 8, 1971: 1971 Major League Baseball draft
  - Dennis Lamp was drafted by the Cubs in the 3rd round. Player signed June 11, 1971.
  - Jim Tyrone was drafted by the Cubs in the 7th round.
- September 9, 1971: Bruce Sutter was signed as an amateur free agent by the Cubs.

=== Roster ===
1971 Chicago Cubs
Roster
| Pitchers: 33 Bill Bonham; 48 Jim Colborn; 36 Joe Decker; 40 Larry Gura; 49 Bill Hands; 30 Ken Holtzman; 44 Burt Hooton; 31 Ferguson Jenkins; 45 Bob Miller; 45 Ray Newman; 32 Milt Pappas; 46 Juan Pizarro; 27 Phil Regan; 37 Earl Stephenson; 38 Ron Tompkins | Catchers: 19 Danny Breeden; 43 Chris Cannizzaro; 47 Frank Fernández; 9 Randy Hundley; 12 J. C. Martin; 15 Ken Rudolph; Infielders: 14 Ernie Banks; 18 Glenn Beckert; 19 Pat Bourque; 25 Hal Breeden; 16 Garry Jestadt; 11 Don Kessinger; 8 Joe Pepitone; 22 Paul Popovich; 10 Ron Santo; 21 Héctor Torres; 23 Ray Webster | Outfielders: 6 Johnny Callison; 29 Brock Davis; 23 Carmen Fanzone; 28 Jim Hickman; 16 Gene Hiser; 24 Cleo James; 25 Billy North; 20 José Ortiz; 26 Billy Williams; Other batters: 3 Al Spangler | Manager: 2 Leo Durocher; Coaches: 5 Joey Amalfitano; 7 Peanuts Lowrey; 3 Al Spangler; 1 Mel Wright |

== Player stats ==
=== Batting ===
==== Starters by position ====
Note: Pos = Position; G = Games played; AB = At bats; H = Hits; Avg. = Batting average; HR = Home runs; RBI = Runs batted in

| Pos | Player | G | AB | H | Avg. | HR | RBI |
|---|---|---|---|---|---|---|---|
| C | Chris Cannizzaro | 71 | 197 | 42 | .213 | 5 | 23 |
| 1B | Joe Pepitone | 115 | 427 | 131 | .307 | 16 | 61 |
| 2B | Glenn Beckert | 131 | 530 | 181 | .342 | 2 | 42 |
| SS | Don Kessinger | 155 | 617 | 159 | .258 | 2 | 38 |
| 3B | Ron Santo | 154 | 555 | 148 | .267 | 21 | 88 |
| LF | Billy Williams | 157 | 594 | 179 | .301 | 28 | 93 |
| CF | Brock Davis | 106 | 301 | 77 | .256 | 0 | 28 |
| RF | Johnny Callison | 103 | 290 | 61 | .210 | 8 | 38 |

==== Other batters ====
Note: G = Games played; AB = At bats; H = Hits; Avg. = Batting average; HR = Home runs; RBI = Runs batted in

| Player | G | AB | H | Avg. | HR | RBI |
|---|---|---|---|---|---|---|
| Jim Hickman | 117 | 383 | 98 | .256 | 19 | 60 |
| Paul Popovich | 89 | 226 | 49 | .217 | 4 | 28 |
| Cleo James | 54 | 150 | 43 | .287 | 2 | 13 |
| J.C. Martin | 47 | 125 | 33 | .264 | 2 | 17 |
| José Ortiz | 36 | 88 | 26 | .295 | 0 | 3 |
| Ernie Banks | 39 | 83 | 16 | .193 | 3 | 6 |
| Ken Rudolph | 25 | 76 | 15 | .197 | 0 | 7 |
| Danny Breeden | 25 | 65 | 10 | .154 | 0 | 4 |
| Héctor Torres | 31 | 58 | 13 | .224 | 0 | 2 |
| Carmen Fanzone | 12 | 43 | 8 | .186 | 2 | 5 |
| Frank Fernández | 17 | 41 | 7 | .171 | 4 | 4 |
| Pat Bourque | 14 | 37 | 7 | .189 | 1 | 3 |
| Hal Breeden | 23 | 36 | 5 | .139 | 1 | 2 |
| Gene Hiser | 17 | 29 | 6 | .207 | 0 | 1 |
| Randy Hundley | 9 | 21 | 7 | .333 | 0 | 2 |
| Billy North | 8 | 16 | 6 | .375 | 0 | 0 |
| Ramon Webster | 16 | 16 | 5 | .313 | 0 | 0 |
| Al Spangler | 5 | 5 | 2 | .400 | 0 | 0 |
| Garry Jestadt | 3 | 3 | 0 | .000 | 0 | 0 |

=== Pitching ===
==== Starting pitchers ====
Note: G = Games pitched; IP = Innings pitched; W = Wins; L = Losses; ERA = Earned run average; SO = Strikeouts

| Player | G | IP | W | L | ERA | SO |
|---|---|---|---|---|---|---|
| Fergie Jenkins | 39 | 325.0 | 24 | 13 | 2.77 | 263 |
| Milt Pappas | 35 | 261.1 | 17 | 14 | 3.51 | 99 |
| Bill Hands | 36 | 242.1 | 12 | 18 | 3.42 | 128 |
| Ken Holtzman | 30 | 195.0 | 9 | 15 | 4.48 | 143 |
| Juan Pizarro | 16 | 101.1 | 7 | 6 | 3.46 | 67 |
| Burt Hooton | 3 | 21.1 | 2 | 0 | 2.11 | 22 |

==== Other pitchers ====
Note: G = Games pitched; IP = Innings pitched; W = Wins; L = Losses; ERA = Earned run average; SO = Strikeouts

| Player | G | IP | W | L | ERA | SO |
|---|---|---|---|---|---|---|
| Joe Decker | 21 | 45.2 | 3 | 2 | 4.73 | 37 |

==== Relief pitchers ====
Note: G = Games pitched; W = Wins; L = Losses; SV = Saves; ERA = Earned run average; SO = Strikeouts

| Player | G | W | L | SV | ERA | SO |
|---|---|---|---|---|---|---|
| Phil Regan | 48 | 5 | 5 | 6 | 3.93 | 28 |
| Ron Tompkins | 35 | 0 | 2 | 3 | 4.08 | 20 |
| Bill Bonham | 33 | 2 | 1 | 0 | 4.65 | 41 |
| Ray Newman | 30 | 1 | 2 | 2 | 3.52 | 35 |
| Earl Stephenson | 16 | 1 | 0 | 1 | 4.43 | 11 |
| Jim Colborn | 14 | 0 | 1 | 0 | 6.57 | 2 |
| Larry Gura | 6 | 0 | 0 | 1 | 6.00 | 2 |
| Bob Miller | 2 | 0 | 0 | 0 | 5.14 | 2 |

== Farm system ==
| Level | Team | League | Manager |
|---|---|---|---|
| AAA | Tacoma Cubs | Pacific Coast League | Jim Marshall |
| AA | San Antonio Missions | Texas League | Walt Dixon |
| A | Quincy Cubs | Midwest League | Dick LeMay |
| Rookie | Caldwell Cubs | Pioneer League | Sparky Davis |
