= 1971 San Diego Padres season =

1971 San Diego Padres
- League: National League
- Division: West
- Ballpark: San Diego Stadium
- City: San Diego, California
- Record: 61–100 (.379)
- Divisional place: 6th
- Owners: C. Arnholdt Smith
- General managers: Buzzie Bavasi
- Managers: Preston Gómez
- Television: KCST (Duke Snider, Bob Chandler)
- Radio: KOGO (Duke Snider, Jerry Gross)

The 1971 San Diego Padres season was the third season in franchise history.

== Offseason ==
- October 20, 1970: Sonny Ruberto was sent by the Padres to the Cincinnati Reds in a conditional deal.
- November 30, 1970: Bill Laxton was drafted by the Padres from the Philadelphia Phillies in the rule 5 draft.

== Regular season ==
=== Opening Day starters ===
- Ollie Brown
- Dave Campbell
- Chris Cannizzaro
- Nate Colbert
- Tommy Dean
- Cito Gaston
- Tom Phoebus
- Ed Spiezio
- Larry Stahl

=== Season standings ===
NL West
Team	W	L	Pct.	GB	Home	Road
San Francisco Giants	90	72	.556	—	51‍–‍30	39‍–‍42
Los Angeles Dodgers	89	73	.549	1	42‍–‍39	47‍–‍34
Atlanta Braves	82	80	.506	8	43‍–‍39	39‍–‍41
Cincinnati Reds	79	83	.488	11	46‍–‍35	33‍–‍48
Houston Astros	79	83	.488	11	39‍–‍42	40‍–‍41
San Diego Padres	61	100	.379	28½	33‍–‍48	28‍–‍52

=== Record vs. opponents ===
1971 National League record Sources:
Team	ATL	CHC	CIN	HOU	LAD	MON	NYM	PHI	PIT	SD	SF	STL
Atlanta	—	5–7	9–9	9–9	9–9	7–5	7–5	8–4	4–8	11–7	7–11	6–6
Chicago	7–5	—	6–6	5–7	8–4	8–10	11–7	11–7	6–12	9–3	3–9	9–9
Cincinnati	9–9	6–6	—	5–13	7–11	7–5	8–4	5–7	5–7	10–8	9–9	8–4
Houston	9–9	7–5	13–5	—	8–10	4–8	5–7	8–4	4–8	10–8	9–9	2–10
Los Angeles	9–9	4–8	11–7	10–8	—	8–4	5–7	7–5	4–8	13–5	12–6	6–6
Montreal	5–7	10–8	5–7	8–4	4–8	—	9–9	6–12	7–11	6–5	7–5	4–14
New York	5–7	7–11	4–8	7–5	7–5	9–9	—	13–5	10–8	7–5	4–8	10–8
Philadelphia	4-8	7–11	2–10	3–9	5–7	6–10	5–13	—	6–12	4–8	6–6	7–11
Pittsburgh	8–4	12–6	7–5	8–4	8–4	11–7	8–10	12–6	—	9–3	3–9	11–7
San Diego	7–11	3–9	8–10	8–10	5–13	5–6	5–7	8–4	3–9	—	5–13	4–8
San Francisco	11–7	9–3	9–9	9–9	6–12	5–7	8–4	6–6	9–3	13–5	—	5–7
St. Louis	6–6	9–9	4–8	10–2	6–6	14–4	8–10	11–7	7–11	8–4	7–5	—

=== Notable transactions ===
- June 11, 1971: Al Santorini was traded by the Padres to the St. Louis Cardinals for Leron Lee and Fred Norman.

=== Roster ===
1971 San Diego Padres
Roster
Pitchers: 37 Ed Acosta; 22 Steve Arlin; 23 Mike Caldwell; 46 Danny Coombs; 30 Mike Corkins; 29 Jay Franklin; 42 Dick Kelley; 43 Clay Kirby; 48 Bill Laxton; 37 Bob Miller; 35 Fred Norman; 36 Tom Phoebus; 15 Dave Roberts; 33 Gary Ross; 23 Al Santorini; 44 Al Severinsen	Catchers: 1 Bob Barton; 8 Chris Cannizzaro; 28 Mike Ivie; 16 Fred Kendall; Infielders: 10 Dave Campbell; 17 Nate Colbert; 3 Tommy Dean; 11 Enzo Hernández; 12 Garry Jestadt; 6 Don Mason; 12 Ron Slocum; 7 Ed Spiezio	Outfielders: 8 Ángel Bravo; 26 Ollie Brown; 9 Al Ferrara; 25 Rod Gaspar; 21 Cito Gaston; 34 Johnny Jeter; 24 Leron Lee; 32 Jerry Morales; 20 Ivan Murrell; 14 Larry Stahl; Other batters: 34 Dave Robinson; 13 Ray Webster	Manager: 18 Preston Gómez; Coaches: 38 Roger Craig (Pitching); 2 Dave Garcia (First Base); 4 Bob Skinner (Hitting & Third Base); 19 Whitey Wietelmann (Bullpen)

== Player stats ==
= Indicates team leader

=== Batting ===
==== Starters by position ====
Note: Pos = Position; G = Games played; AB = At bats; H = Hits; Avg. = Batting average; HR = Home runs; RBI = Runs batted in

Pos	Player	G	AB	H	Avg.	HR	RBI
C	Bob Barton	121	376	94	.250	5	23
1B	Nate Colbert	156	565	149	.264	27	84
2B	Don Mason	113	344	73	.212	2	11
SS	Enzo Hernández	143	549	122	.222	0	12
3B	Ed Spezio	97	308	71	.231	7	36
LF	Leron Lee	79	256	70	.273	4	21
CF	Cito Gaston	141	518	118	.228	17	61
RF	Ollie Brown	145	484	132	.273	9	55

==== Other batters ====
Note: G = Games played; AB = At bats; H = Hits; Avg. = Batting average; HR = Home runs; RBI = Runs batted in

Player	G	AB	H	Avg.	HR	RBI
Dave Campbell	108	365	83	.227	7	29
Larry Stahl	114	308	78	.253	8	36
Ivan Murrell	103	255	60	.235	7	24
Garry Jestadt	75	189	55	.291	0	13
Fred Kendall	49	111	19	.171	1	7
Johnny Jeter	18	75	24	.320	1	3
Tommy Dean	41	70	8	.114	0	1
Chris Cannizzaro	21	63	12	.190	1	8
Ángel Bravo	52	58	9	.155	0	6
Ron Slocum	7	18	0	.000	0	0
Al Ferrara	17	17	2	.118	0	2
Rod Gaspar	16	17	2	.118	0	2
Mike Ivie	6	17	8	.471	0	3
Jerry Morales	12	17	2	.118	0	1
Ray Webster	10	8	1	.125	0	0
Dave Robinson	7	6	0	.000	0	0

=== Pitching ===
==== Starting pitchers ====
Note: G = Games pitched; IP = Innings pitched; W = Wins; L = Losses; ERA = Earned run average; SO = Strikeouts

Player	G	IP	W	L	ERA	SO
Dave Roberts	37	269.2	14	17	2.10	135
Clay Kirby	38	267.1	15	13	2.83	231
Steve Arlin	36	227.2	9	19	3.48	156
Tom Phoebus	29	133.1	3	11	4.46	80
Fred Norman	20	127.1	3	12	3.32	77
Ed Acosta	8	46.0	3	3	2.74	16

==== Other pitchers ====
Note: G = Games pitched; IP = Innings pitched; W = Wins; L = Losses; ERA = Earned run average; SO = Strikeouts

Player	G	IP	W	L	ERA	SO
Danny Coombs	19	57.2	1	6	6.24	37
Al Santorini	18	38.1	0	2	3.76	21
Jay Franklin	3	5.2	0	1	6.35	4

==== Relief pitchers ====
Note: G = Games pitched; W = Wins; L = Losses; SV = Saves; ERA = Earned run average; SO = Strikeouts

Player	G	W	L	SV	ERA	SO
Al Severinsen	59	2	5	8	3.47	31
Dick Kelley	48	2	3	2	3.47	42
Bob Miller	38	7	3	7	1.41	36
Bill Laxton	18	0	2	0	6.83	23
Gary Ross	13	1	3	0	2.96	13
Mike Corkins	8	0	0	0	3.46	16
Mike Caldwell	6	1	0	0	0.00	5

== Award winners ==
1971 Major League Baseball All-Star Game

== Farm system ==
Level	Team	League	Manager
AAA	Hawaii Islanders	Pacific Coast League	Bill Adair
A	Lodi Padres	California League	George Freese
A-Short Season	Tri-City Padres	Northwest League	Cliff Ditto

LEAGUE CHAMPIONS: Tri-City
