= 1971 Los Angeles Dodgers season =

1971 Los Angeles Dodgers
- League: National League
- Division: West
- Ballpark: Dodger Stadium
- City: Los Angeles
- Record: 89–73 (.549)
- Divisional place: 2nd
- Owners: Walter O'Malley, James Mulvey
- President: Peter O'Malley
- General managers: Al Campanis
- Managers: Walter Alston
- Television: KTTV (11)
- Radio: KFI; Vin Scully, Jerry Doggett; KWKW; Jose Garcia, Jaime Jarrín

The 1971 Los Angeles Dodgers season was the 82nd season for the Los Angeles Dodgers franchise in Major League Baseball (MLB), their 14th season in Los Angeles, California, and their 10th season playing their home games at Dodger Stadium in Los Angeles California. The Dodgers finished the season in second place in the National League West.

== Offseason ==
- October 5, 1970: Ted Sizemore and Bob Stinson were traded by the Dodgers to the St. Louis Cardinals for Dick Allen.
- December 11, 1970: Alan Foster and Ray Lamb were traded by the Dodgers to the Cleveland Indians for Duke Sims.
- February 10, 1971: Andy Kosco was traded by the Dodgers to the Milwaukee Brewers for Al Downing.
- March 13, 1971: Jeff Torborg was purchased from the Dodgers by the California Angels.

== Regular season ==
=== Season standings ===
NL West
Team	W	L	Pct.	GB	Home	Road
San Francisco Giants	90	72	.556	—	51‍–‍30	39‍–‍42
Los Angeles Dodgers	89	73	.549	1	42‍–‍39	47‍–‍34
Atlanta Braves	82	80	.506	8	43‍–‍39	39‍–‍41
Cincinnati Reds	79	83	.488	11	46‍–‍35	33‍–‍48
Houston Astros	79	83	.488	11	39‍–‍42	40‍–‍41
San Diego Padres	61	100	.379	28½	33‍–‍48	28‍–‍52

=== Record vs. opponents ===
1971 National League record Sources:
Team	ATL	CHC	CIN	HOU	LAD	MON	NYM	PHI	PIT	SD	SF	STL
Atlanta	—	5–7	9–9	9–9	9–9	7–5	7–5	8–4	4–8	11–7	7–11	6–6
Chicago	7–5	—	6–6	5–7	8–4	8–10	11–7	11–7	6–12	9–3	3–9	9–9
Cincinnati	9–9	6–6	—	5–13	7–11	7–5	8–4	5–7	5–7	10–8	9–9	8–4
Houston	9–9	7–5	13–5	—	8–10	4–8	5–7	8–4	4–8	10–8	9–9	2–10
Los Angeles	9–9	4–8	11–7	10–8	—	8–4	5–7	7–5	4–8	13–5	12–6	6–6
Montreal	5–7	10–8	5–7	8–4	4–8	—	9–9	6–12	7–11	6–5	7–5	4–14
New York	5–7	7–11	4–8	7–5	7–5	9–9	—	13–5	10–8	7–5	4–8	10–8
Philadelphia	4-8	7–11	2–10	3–9	5–7	6–10	5–13	—	6–12	4–8	6–6	7–11
Pittsburgh	8–4	12–6	7–5	8–4	8–4	11–7	8–10	12–6	—	9–3	3–9	11–7
San Diego	7–11	3–9	8–10	8–10	5–13	5–6	5–7	8–4	3–9	—	5–13	4–8
San Francisco	11–7	9–3	9–9	9–9	6–12	5–7	8–4	6–6	9–3	13–5	—	5–7
St. Louis	6–6	9–9	4–8	10–2	6–6	14–4	8–10	11–7	7–11	8–4	7–5	—

=== Opening Day lineup ===
Opening Day starters
Name	Position
Maury Wills	Shortstop
Bill Buckner	Right fielder
Willie Davis	Center fielder
Wes Parker	First baseman
Dick Allen	Left fielder
Duke Sims	Catcher
Steve Garvey	Third baseman
Bill Russell	Second baseman
Bill Singer	Starting pitcher

=== Roster ===
1971 Los Angeles Dodgers
Roster
Pitchers: 48 Doyle Alexander; 21 Jim Brewer; 44 Al Downing; 49 Charlie Hough; 46 Pete Mikkelsen; 25 Joe Moeller; 50 Bob O'Brien; 23 Claude Osteen; 29 José Peña; 40 Bill Singer; 37 Mike Strahler; 20 Don Sutton; 38 Sandy Vance; 31 Hoyt Wilhelm	Catchers: 13 Joe Ferguson; 14 Tom Haller; 8 Duke Sims; 16 Bill Sudakis; Infielders: 15 Dick Allen; 6 Steve Garvey; 1 Billy Grabarkewitz; 5 Jim Lefebvre; 28 Wes Parker; 18 Bill Russell; 2 Bobby Valentine; 30 Maury Wills	Outfielders: 22 Bill Buckner; 27 Willie Crawford; 35 Bobby Darwin; 3 Willie Davis; 12 Von Joshua; 11 Manny Mota; 17 Tom Paciorek; Other batters: 10 Ron Cey	Manager: 24 Walter Alston; Coaches: 26 Red Adams; 52 Carroll Beringer; 19 Jim Gilliam; 7 Roy Hartsfield; 33 Danny Ozark; 51 Dixie Walker

== Player stats ==
=== Batting ===
==== Starters by position ====
Note: Pos = Position; G = Games played; AB = At bats; H = Hits; Avg. = Batting average; HR = Home runs; RBI = Runs batted in

Pos	Player	G	AB	H	Avg.	HR	RBI
C	Duke Sims	90	230	63	.274	6	25
1B	Wes Parker	157	533	146	.274	6	62
2B	Jim Lefebvre	119	388	95	.245	12	68
SS	Maury Wills	149	601	169	.281	3	44
3B	Dick Allen	155	549	162	.295	23	90
LF	Willie Crawford	114	342	96	.281	9	40
CF	Willie Davis	158	641	198	.309	10	74
RF	Bill Buckner	108	358	99	.277	5	41

==== Other batters ====
Note: G = Games played; AB = At bats; H = Hits; Avg. = Batting average; HR = Home runs; RBI = Runs batted in

Player	G	AB	H	Avg.	HR	RBI
Bobby Valentine	101	281	70	.249	1	25
Manny Mota	91	269	84	.312	0	34
Steve Garvey	81	225	51	.227	7	26
Bill Russell	91	211	48	.227	2	15
Tom Haller	84	202	54	.267	5	32
Joe Ferguson	36	102	22	.216	2	7
Bill Sudakis	41	83	16	.193	3	7
Billy Grabarkewitz	44	71	16	.225	0	6
Bobby Darwin	11	20	5	.250	1	4
Von Joshua	11	7	0	.000	0	0
Ron Cey	2	2	0	.000	0	0
Tom Paciorek	2	2	1	.500	0	1

=== Pitching ===
==== Starting pitchers ====
Note: G = Games pitched; IP = Innings pitched; W = Wins; L = Losses; ERA = Earned run average; SO = Strikeouts

Player	G	IP	W	L	ERA	SO
Don Sutton	38	265.1	17	12	2.54	194
Al Downing	37	262.1	20	9	2.68	136
Claude Osteen	38	259.0	14	11	3.51	109
Bill Singer	31	203.1	10	17	4.16	144
Doyle Alexander	17	92.1	6	6	3.80	30

==== Other pitchers ====
Note: G = Games pitched; IP = Innings pitched; W = Wins; L = Losses; ERA = Earned run average; SO = Strikeouts

Player	G	IP	W	L	ERA	SO
Bob O'Brien	14	42.0	2	2	3.00	15
Sandy Vance	10	26.0	2	1	6.92	11

==== Relief pitchers ====
Note: G = Games pitched; W = Wins; L = Losses; SV = Saves; ERA = Earned run average; SO = Strikeouts

Player	G	W	L	SV	ERA	SO
Jim Brewer	55	6	5	22	1.88	66
Pete Mikkelsen	41	8	5	5	3.65	46
Joe Moeller	28	2	4	1	3.80	32
José Peña	21	2	0	1	3.56	44
Hoyt Wilhelm	9	0	1	3	1.02	15
Mike Strahler	6	0	0	0	2.84	7
Charlie Hough	4	0	0	0	4.15	4

== Awards and honors ==
- Gold Glove Awards
  - Willie Davis
  - Wes Parker
- Comeback Player of the Year Award
  - Al Downing

=== All-Stars ===
- 1971 Major League Baseball All-Star Game
  - Willie Davis reserve
- TSN National League All-Star
  - Willie Davis

== Farm system ==
Level	Team	League	Manager
AAA	Spokane Indians	Pacific Coast League	Tommy Lasorda
AA	Albuquerque Dodgers	Texas League	Monty Basgall
A	Bakersfield Dodgers	California League	Don LeJohn
A	Daytona Beach Dodgers	Florida State League	Stan Wasiak
A	Medford Dodgers	Northwest League	Bill Berrier
Rookie	Ogden Dodgers	Pioneer League	Buddy Hollowell

== 1971 Major League Baseball draft ==
This was the seventh year of a Major League Baseball draft. The Dodgers drafted 55 players in the June draft and six in the January draft. Seven of them would eventually play in MLB.

The only notable Major League player in this draft class was first round pick Rick Rhoden, a pitcher from Atlantic High School in Delray Beach, Florida. He pitched in the Majors from 1974–1989, the first five years with the Dodgers. He would have a record of 151–125 and was a two time all-star.

1971 draft picks

=== January draft ===
Round	Name	Position	School	Signed	Career span	Highest level
1	Steven Olsen	LHP	American River College	No; Independent	1971	Rookie
2	Don Standley	RHP	Fullerton College	Yes	1971–1977	AAA
3	Paul Few	P	Chipola College	No		

==== January secondary phase ====
Round	Name	Position	School	Signed	Career span	Highest level
1	James Corcoran	SS	University of California, Berkeley	Yes	1971	AA
2	David Freeborn	SS	Shafter High School	Yes	1971–1974	A
3	Francisco Suarez	SS	Miami Dade College	No; Twins-June 1971	1971	A-

=== June draft ===
Round	Name	Position	School	Signed	Career span	Highest level
1	Rick Rhoden	RHP	Atlantic High School	Yes	1971–1989	MLB
2	Greg Reinecker	RHP	Edgewood High School	Yes	1971–1974	A
3	Ricky Green	RHP	Chino High School	Yes	1971–1974	AA
4	Michael Frazier	C	Elmore High School	No; Cardinals – 1975	1975	Rookie
5	Rex Hudson	RHP	Hale High School	Yes	1971–1977	MLB
6	Christopher Mayo	LHP	Hillsdale High School	Yes	1971	Rookie
7	Chuck Redmon	SS	Moore High School	No; Cardinals – 1975	1975	A
8	Terry Stupy	C	Los Alamitos High School	No; Angels – 1975	1975–1978	AA
9	Thaddeus Philyaw	OF	Gunn High School	Yes	1971–1975	AA
10	Thomas Urban	RHP	Mount Miguel High School	Yes	1971–1972	A-
11	Stanley Watkins	LHP	Pacifica High School	Yes	1971	Rookie
12	Terrence Senn	2B	University of San Francisco	No; Mets – 1972	1972–1978	AAA
13	Robert Sans	1B	Texas A&M University	No; Dodgers – 1972	1972	A
14	John Hale	OF	Wasco High School	Yes	1971–1981	MLB
15	Leon Wood	2B	Polk Community College	Yes	1971–1974	A
16	Al Arthur	RHP	Lake Oswego High School	No; Twins-1975	1975–1977	AAA
17	James Conn	SS	Vanderbilt University	Yes	1971–1974	AA
18	Patrick McNally	1B	Redlands High School	No; Angels-1975	1975	Rookie
19	Robert Austin	RHP	Grover Cleveland High School	No		
20	Hiawatha Roberson	OF	Cañada College	Yes	1971–1972	A
21	Larry Wolfe	SS	Cordova High School	No; Twins-1973	1973–1982	MLB
22	Curtis Hires	C	Thomas Jefferson High School	Yes	1971	A-
23	Edgar Carroll	LHP	El Segundo High School	Yes	1971–1980	AAA
24	William Hattis	RHP	New Trier East High School	No		
25	Michael Harrelson	OF	University of Georgia	Yes	1971–1973	A-
26	Dana Hendershott	LHP	University of San Francisco	Yes	1971–1973	AA
27	Bobby Johnson	OF	Southern University and A&M College	Yes	1971	Rookie
28	John Coon	RHP	Las Vegas High School	No		
29	Kevin Pasley	C	Chaminade High School	Yes	1971–1982	MLB
30	Douglas Radestock	LHP	Santana High School	Yes	1971–1972	Rookie
31	Kim Andrew	SS	Monroe High School	No; Orioles-1972	1972–1977	MLB
32	Steve Rhodin	1B	Ypsilanti High School	No		
33	Michael Vinci	3B	Lakeland High School	Yes	1971	A-
34	Theodore Schultz	SS	Escondido High School	No; White Sox-1975	1975–1976	AA
35	Tom Hume	RHP	Northeast High School	No; Reds-1972	1972–1987	MLB
36	Willis Gallop	RHP	Santa Fe High School	No		
37	Michael Thomas	OF	Kirkman High School	Yes	1971	Rookie
38	Mike Sudduth	LHP	Holtville High School	No		
39	Keathel Chauncey	OF	Polk Community College	No; Rangers-1974	1974–1981	AAA
40	Samuel Ceci	C	University of Southern California	No; Twins-1972	1972–1976	AAA
41	Randolph Hoppe	C	Santa Rosa Junior College	Yes	1971–1972	A
42	Michael Collins	LHP	California State University, Long Beach	Yes	1971	A-
43	Richard Rogers	3B	McLain High School	No		
44	Ron Wrona	SS	Bishop Kelley High School	No		
45	Eddie Ford	SS	Great Neck South High School	No; Red Sox-1974	1974–1977	AAA
46	Joe Camp	1B	North Florida Community College	No		
47	Mike Trifiolis	1B	West Orange High School	No		
48	Don Stackpole	C	Elsinore High School	No		

==== June secondary phase ====
Round	Name	Position	School	Signed	Career span	Highest level
1	Mike Pfitzer	RHP	Mesa Community College	No; Dodgers-1973	1973–1974	A
2	Roger Keilig	C	Cañada College	Yes	1971–1973	A

==== June secondary D phase ====
Round	Name	Position	School	Signed	Career span	Highest level
1	Steven Patchin	C	University of Missouri, Columbia	Yes	1971–1981	AAA
2	Tim Evans	SS	University of Colorado	No		
3	Pat Paulson	LHP	East Haven High School	Yes	1971	Rookie
4	Roy Peterson	OF-1B	Colorado State University–Pueblo	Yes	1971	Rookie
5	Mike Siani	SS	Villanova University	No		
