= Boots Day =

American baseball player (born 1947)

- Center fielder
- Born: August 31, 1947 (age 79); Ilion, New York, U.S.
- Batted: Left Threw: Left

MLB debut
- June 15, 1969, for the St. Louis Cardinals

Last MLB appearance
- September 24, 1974, for the Montreal Expos

MLB statistics
- Batting average: .256
- Home runs: 8
- Runs batted in: 98
- Stats at Baseball Reference

Teams
- St. Louis Cardinals (1969); Chicago Cubs (1970); Montreal Expos (1970–1974)

Charles Frederick "Boots" Day (born August 31, 1947) is an American former professional baseball outfielder. He played in Major League Baseball (MLB) for the St. Louis Cardinals, Chicago Cubs, and Montreal Expos. Day was bench coach for the Evansville Otters of the Frontier League, and was in professional baseball for 55 years before retiring in 2021.

A native of Ilion, New York, Day played Major League Baseball for all or parts of six seasons (1969–74), with the bulk of that time spent with the Montreal Expos.

He threw and batted left-handed, stood 5 feet 9 inches (1.75 m) tall and weighed 160 pounds (73 kg).

== Early life ==
Day was born on August 31, 1947, in Ilion, New York. He attended Ilion High School, where he was well known for his basketball and baseball prowess. As a pitcher on the baseball team he won all of his games but one (a 1–0 loss); and he was a phenomenal hitter. Day's elementary school principal, Bart Shelley, was a regional scout for the St. Louis Cardinals, who signed Day in 1965. Even though he played in the Cardinals system in 1965, it has also been stated he signed with them on January 1, 1966.

Day is a member of the inaugural class of the Ilion High School Alumni Hall of Fame (2017). He also attended Mohawk Valley Community College. In 2012, he was inducted into the Mohawk Valley Baseball Hall of Fame. In 1993, he was inducted into the Greater Utica Sports Hall of Fame.

== Minor league player ==
In 1965, Day was assigned to the Cardinals Florida Instructional League team. From 1966 to 1968, he played in the Cardinals minor league system. In 1968, with the Double-A Arkansas Travelers of the Texas League, Day played in 137 games with a .295 batting average, 17 home runs, 26 doubles, 67 runs batted in (RBI) and 68 runs scored. He also had 24 assists and was part of five double-plays as an outfielder. In 1969, he played 93 games for the Triple-A Tulsa Oilers, hitting .262, and played 11 games for the National League Cardinals. In 1970, after two trades, he played the majority of the season for the Montreal Expos Triple-A affiliate, the Buffalo Bisons/Winnipeg Whips, hitting .294 with 10 home runs in 313 at bats, and 13 assists from the outfield. The team had moved from Buffalo to Winnipeg on June 11, 1970.

== Major league player ==
Day received a major league trial with the Cardinals in 1969, playing in 11 games and going hitless in six at bats. At the close of the season, in December 1969, he was traded to the Chicago Cubs for left-handed pitcher Rich Nye. He made the Cubs' opening day 1970 roster, but only played in 11 games before being traded, in May, to Montreal for veteran catcher Jack Hiatt. After further seasoning in Triple-A, at Buffalo and Winnipeg, he was recalled by the Expos in 1970, hitting .269 in 41 games; and played the next three-plus seasons as Montreal's platoon center fielder.

In 1971, his best major league season, he reached career highs in hits (105), home runs (4), RBIs (33), and batting average (.283) in 122 games played. He was tied for second in the league in sacrifice hits (16). Although he only played in 118 games in center field, he tied for the league lead in assists by a center fielder (9), with Cito Gaston who played 125 games in center field that year. Day was also second in fielding percentage (.983).

After slumping in 1972 where he hit .233 in 128 games (though he was second in the league in double plays by a center fielder), he returned to form the following season, batting .275 in 1973, with 13 pinch hits, but in only 207 at bats and 101 games.

The Expos were in the division championship race until the last week of the 1973 season. Before the 1974 season, the Expos acquired veteran center fielder Willie Davis in an offseason blockbuster trade with the Los Angeles Dodgers for star relief pitcher Mike Marshall (who would win the Cy Young Award for the Dodgers in 1974). Day lost his semi-regular job. After only 52 games and 72 at-bats in 1974, he returned to the minor leagues for the remainder of his playing career.

His No. 8 uniform was then issued to rookie catcher Gary Carter in 1975; Carter went on to a Baseball Hall of Fame career and the Expos retired the number in his honor.

Day appeared in 471 MLB games (449 of them with Montreal), and batted .256 with 295 hits, 28 doubles, eight home runs and 98 runs batted in, in 1,151 at-bats.

== Return to minor leagues ==
Day finished the 1974 season playing for the Memphis Blues of the Triple-A International League. He played four years for the Detroit Tiger affiliate Triple-A Evansville Triplets (1975–78), never hitting above .266 or having more than 314 at bats. Other than one at bat at age 74 for the Evansville Otters in 2021, he finished his professional career at age 32, in 1980, playing sparingly for the Triplets and the Single-A Lakeland Tigers. He began the 1980 season as Lakeland's hitting coach, before finishing his playing career in Evansville.

== Coaching career ==
After finishing his playing career, the Tigers kept him in their organization. From 1981 to 1983, he was an assistant coach and then manager of the Bristol Tigers. From 1984 to 1989, he worked as an advance scout for the Tigers; the Tigers winning the World Series in 1984. He worked in the New York Yankees system (1990–91), and scouted for the Kansas City Royals (1992–94).

He became the first ever manager for the Evansville Otters of the Frontier League in 1995. In 1996, he became hitting coach for a newer incarnation of the Buffalo Bisons, a Triple-A affiliate of the Cleveland Indians in the American Association; and in 1997 was the hitting coach for Cleveland's Single-A affiliate, the Kinston Indians.

From 1998 to 2003, Day coached in the Cardinals organization, serving as a hitting coach for the Single-A Prince Williams Cannons and the Triple-A Memphis Redbirds, and assistant coach for the Cardinals. One of the players he coached was Albert Pujols, a member of the 2000 Redbirds championship team. He spent 2002–03 as an assistant coach under Hall of Fame manager Tony La Russa with the Cardinals before returning to the minor leagues as a hitting coach from 2004 to 2014 with various teams.

In 2010, he was the hitting coach of the Calgary Vipers of the Golden Baseball League and in 2011 he held the same position with the Normal CornBelters of the Frontier League. In 2012, Day returned to the Otters as a hitting coach, and he won the Frontier League's Darren Bush Coach of the Year Award for excellence in player development. Day later becoming the Otters bench coach in 2015, and remained with the club through the 2021 season.

Day retired from coaching on September 13, 2021, age 74, after a winning game with the Evansville Otters against the Lake Erie Crushers with a final score of 3–1. Day was lead off batter for the game. At retirement, he had been in professional baseball for 55 years.
