= Ren Kelly =

American baseball player (1899–1963)

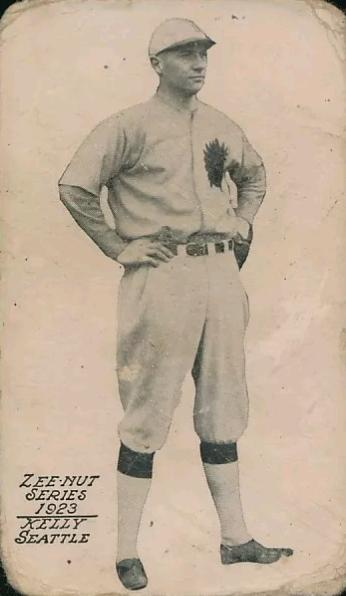
- Pitcher
- Born: November 18, 1899; San Francisco
- Died: August 24, 1963 (aged 63); Millbrae, California
- Batted: Right Threw: Right

MLB debut
- September 18, 1923, for the Philadelphia Athletics

Last MLB appearance
- September 18, 1923, for the Philadelphia Athletics

MLB statistics
- Games played: 1
- Innings: 7
- Earned run average: 2.57
- Stats at Baseball Reference

Teams
- Philadelphia Athletics (1923)

Reynolds Joseph "Ren" Kelly (November 18, 1899 – August 24, 1963) was an American pitcher in Major League Baseball who played in one game for the Philadelphia Athletics on September 18, 1923. In that game, he pitched seven innings in relief, gave up seven hits, two earned runs, while walking four batters, and striking out one.

Kelly was born and raised in San Francisco, and was the California High School player of the year for 1919, when he attended San Francisco's Polytechnic High School.

Kelly is the younger brother of Hall of Famer George "High Pockets" Kelly, and spent spring training with his brother's New York Giants team in 1920. Coach Christy Mathewson like his size, assortment of pitches, and his accurate pitching, but he did not make the team. His uncle, Bill Lange, and cousin, Rich Chiles, also played Major League Baseball. Kelly died at the age of 63 in Millbrae, California and is interred at Oak Hill Memorial Park in San Jose, California.
