= 1971 New York Mets season =

1971 New York Mets
- League: National League
- Division: East
- Ballpark: Shea Stadium
- City: New York
- Record: 83–79 (.512)
- Divisional place: 3rd
- Owners: Joan Whitney Payson
- General manager: Bob Scheffing
- Manager: Gil Hodges
- Television: WOR-TV
- Radio: WJRZ/WNBC-FM (Ralph Kiner, Lindsey Nelson, Bob Murphy)

The 1971 New York Mets season was the tenth regular season for the Mets, who played home games at Shea Stadium. Led by manager Gil Hodges, the team posted an 83–79 record and finished the season tied for third place in the National League East, fourteen games behind the first place Pittsburgh Pirates.

== Offseason ==
- October 20, 1970: Larry Bearnarth was purchased from the Mets by the Milwaukee Brewers.
- November 30, 1970: Joe Foy was drafted by the Washington Senators from the New York Mets in the 1970 rule 5 draft.
- January 28, 1971: Benny Ayala was signed by the Mets as an amateur free agent.
- March 30, 1971: Dean Chance and Bill Denehy were traded by the Mets to the Detroit Tigers for Jerry Robertson.
- March 31, 1971: Ron Swoboda and Rich Hacker were traded by the Mets to the Montreal Expos for Don Hahn.
- Prior to 1971 season: Frank Estrada was acquired by the Mets from the Mexico City Reds.

== Regular season ==
=== Season standings ===
NL East
Team	W	L	Pct.	GB	Home	Road
Pittsburgh Pirates	97	65	.599	—	52‍–‍28	45‍–‍37
St. Louis Cardinals	90	72	.556	7	45‍–‍36	45‍–‍36
Chicago Cubs	83	79	.512	14	44‍–‍37	39‍–‍42
New York Mets	83	79	.512	14	44‍–‍37	39‍–‍42
Montreal Expos	71	90	.441	25½	36‍–‍44	35‍–‍46
Philadelphia Phillies	67	95	.414	30	34‍–‍47	33‍–‍48

=== Record vs. opponents ===
1971 National League record Sources:
Team	ATL	CHC	CIN	HOU	LAD	MON	NYM	PHI	PIT	SD	SF	STL
Atlanta	—	5–7	9–9	9–9	9–9	7–5	7–5	8–4	4–8	11–7	7–11	6–6
Chicago	7–5	—	6–6	5–7	8–4	8–10	11–7	11–7	6–12	9–3	3–9	9–9
Cincinnati	9–9	6–6	—	5–13	7–11	7–5	8–4	5–7	5–7	10–8	9–9	8–4
Houston	9–9	7–5	13–5	—	8–10	4–8	5–7	8–4	4–8	10–8	9–9	2–10
Los Angeles	9–9	4–8	11–7	10–8	—	8–4	5–7	7–5	4–8	13–5	12–6	6–6
Montreal	5–7	10–8	5–7	8–4	4–8	—	9–9	6–12	7–11	6–5	7–5	4–14
New York	5–7	7–11	4–8	7–5	7–5	9–9	—	13–5	10–8	7–5	4–8	10–8
Philadelphia	4-8	7–11	2–10	3–9	5–7	6–10	5–13	—	6–12	4–8	6–6	7–11
Pittsburgh	8–4	12–6	7–5	8–4	8–4	11–7	8–10	12–6	—	9–3	3–9	11–7
San Diego	7–11	3–9	8–10	8–10	5–13	5–6	5–7	8–4	3–9	—	5–13	4–8
San Francisco	11–7	9–3	9–9	9–9	6–12	5–7	8–4	6–6	9–3	13–5	—	5–7
St. Louis	6–6	9–9	4–8	10–2	6–6	14–4	8–10	11–7	7–11	8–4	7–5	—

=== Notable transactions ===
- June 16, 1971: Jimy Williams was purchased by the Mets from the Montreal Expos.

=== Roster ===
1971 New York Mets
Roster
Pitchers: 38 Buzz Capra; 34 Danny Frisella; 39 Gary Gentry; 36 Jerry Koosman; 32 Jon Matlack; 43 Jim McAndrew; 45 Tug McGraw; 31 Don Rose; 30 Nolan Ryan; 33 Ray Sadecki; 41 Tom Seaver; 42 Ron Taylor; 35 Charlie Williams	Catchers: 10 Duffy Dyer; 5 Frank Estrada; 15 Jerry Grote; Infielders: 2 Bob Aspromonte; 12 Ken Boswell; 22 Donn Clendenon; 19 Tim Foli; 11 Wayne Garrett; 3 Bud Harrelson; 7 Ed Kranepool; 17 Ted Martínez; 6 Al Weis	Outfielders: 20 Tommie Agee; 25 Don Hahn; 21 Cleon Jones; 16 Mike Jorgensen; 18 Dave Marshall; 28 John Milner; 24 Art Shamsky; 29 Ken Singleton; 23,44 Leroy Stanton	Manager: 14 Gil Hodges; Coaches: 8 Yogi Berra; 52 Joe Pignatano; 54 Rube Walker; 53 Eddie Yost

== Player stats ==
=== Batting ===
==== Starters by position ====
Note: Pos = Position; G = Games played; AB = At bats; H = Hits; Avg. = Batting average; HR = Home runs; RBI = Runs batted in

Pos	Player	G	AB	H	Avg.	HR	RBI
C	Jerry Grote	125	403	109	.270	2	35
1B	Ed Kranepool	122	421	118	.280	14	58
2B	Ken Boswell	116	392	107	.273	5	40
SS	Bud Harrelson	142	547	138	.252	0	32
3B	Bob Aspromonte	104	342	77	.225	5	33
LF	Cleon Jones	136	505	161	.319	14	69
CF	Tommie Agee	113	425	121	.285	14	50
RF	Ken Singleton	115	298	73	.245	13	46

==== Other batters ====
Note: G = Games played; AB = At bats; H = Hits; Avg. = Batting average; HR = Home runs; RBI = Runs batted in

Player	G	AB	H	Avg.	HR	RBI
Tim Foli	97	288	65	.226	0	24
Donn Clendenon	88	263	65	.247	11	37
Dave Marshall	100	214	51	.238	3	21
Wayne Garrett	56	202	43	.213	1	11
Don Hahn	98	178	42	.236	1	11
Duffy Dyer	59	169	39	.231	2	18
Art Shamsky	68	135	25	.185	5	18
Ted Martínez	38	125	36	.288	1	10
Mike Jorgensen	45	118	26	.220	5	11
Leroy Stanton	5	21	4	.190	0	2
John Milner	9	18	3	.167	0	1
Al Weis	11	11	0	.000	0	1
Frank Estrada	1	2	1	.500	0	0

=== Pitching ===
==== Starting pitchers ====
Note: G = Games pitched; IP = Innings pitched; W = Wins; L = Losses; ERA = Earned run average; SO = Strikeouts

Player	G	IP	W	L	ERA	SO
Tom Seaver	36	286.1	20	10	1.76	289
Gary Gentry	32	203.1	12	11	3.23	155
Jerry Koosman	26	165.2	6	11	3.04	96
Nolan Ryan	30	152.0	10	14	3.97	137
Jon Matlack	7	37.0	0	3	4.14	24

==== Other pitchers ====
Note: G = Games pitched; IP = Innings pitched; W = Wins; L = Losses; ERA = Earned run average; SO = Strikeouts

Player	G	IP	W	L	ERA	SO
Ray Sadecki	34	163.1	7	7	2.92	120
Charlie Williams	31	90.1	5	6	4.78	53
Jim McAndrew	24	90.1	2	5	4.38	42

==== Relief pitchers ====
Note: G = Games pitched; W = Wins; L = Losses; SV = Saves; ERA = Earned run average; SO = Strikeouts

Player	G	W	L	SV	ERA	SO
Danny Frisella	53	8	5	12	1.99	93
Tug McGraw	51	11	4	8	1.70	109
Ron Taylor	45	2	2	2	3.65	32
Buzz Capra	3	0	1	0	8.44	6
Don Rose	1	0	0	0	0.00	1

== Farm system ==
Level	Team	League	Manager
AAA	Tidewater Tides	International League	Hank Bauer
AA	Memphis Blues	Texas League	John Antonelli
A	Visalia Mets	California League	Joe Frazier
A	Pompano Beach Mets	Florida State League	Gordon Mackenzie
Rookie	Marion Mets	Appalachian League	Chuck Hiller

LEAGUE CHAMPIONS: Visalia
