= Cleo James =

American baseball player (born 1940)

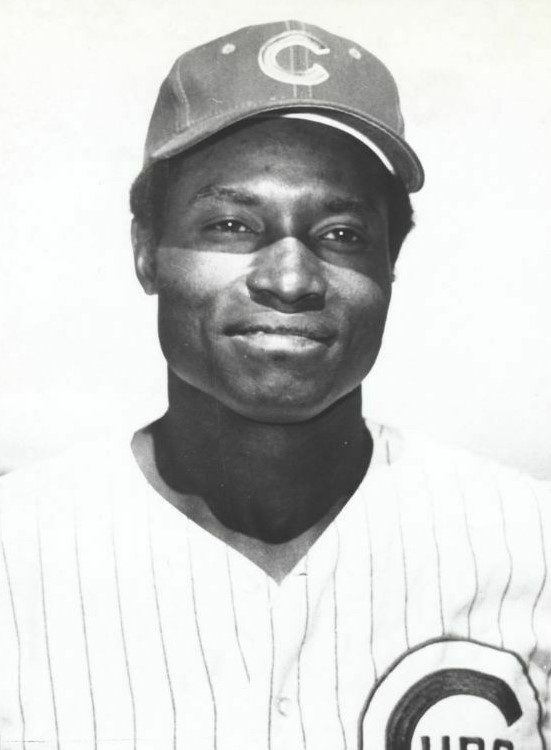
- Outfielder
- Born: August 31, 1940 (age 85); Clarksdale, Mississippi, U.S.
- Batted: Right Threw: Right

MLB debut
- April 15, 1968, for the Los Angeles Dodgers

Last MLB appearance
- September 26, 1973, for the Chicago Cubs

MLB statistics
- Batting average: .228
- Home runs: 5
- Runs batted in: 27
- Stats at Baseball Reference

Teams
- Los Angeles Dodgers (1968); Chicago Cubs (1970–1971, 1973)

Cleo Joel James (born August 31, 1940) is an American former professional baseball outfielder. He played in Major League Baseball (MLB) with the Los Angeles Dodgers in 1968 and for the Chicago Cubs between 1970 and 1973.

A baseball and football star at Riverside, California Junior College (now Riverside City College), James decided on professional baseball. After playing briefly with the Dodgers in 1968, he returned to the minor leagues and made the Pacific Coast League All-Star team in 1969, and finished third in the league in batting average.

The Cubs acquired him in December 1969 draft through the Rule 5 draft, which allows major league teams to draft players from other organizations' minor league teams.

In the 1970 Chicago Cubs season, James played in 100 games as a rookie. Early in the season, he frequently was used as a defensive replacement in center field in late innings. By June he was the Cubs' starting centerfielder, but lost his position when the team acquired Joe Pepitone in July. On Sept. 3, James started in left field in place of Billy Williams, ending Williams' then National League record 1,117 consecutive games played streak.
