= Rich Chiles =

American baseball player (born 1949)

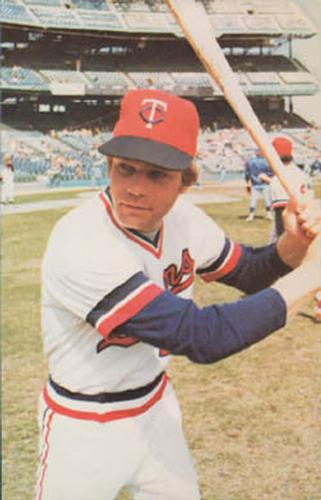
- Outfielder
- Born: November 22, 1949 (age 76); Sacramento, California, U.S.
- Batted: Left Threw: Left

MLB debut
- April 20, 1971, for the Houston Astros

Last MLB appearance
- September 30, 1978, for the Minnesota Twins

MLB statistics
- Batting average: .254
- Home runs: 6
- Runs batted in: 76
- Stats at Baseball Reference

Teams
- Houston Astros (1971–1972); New York Mets (1973); Houston Astros (1976); Minnesota Twins (1977–1978)

Richard Francis Chiles (born November 22, 1949, in Sacramento, California, and raised in Winters, California) is a former outfielder in Major League Baseball.

Chiles was drafted by the Houston Astros in the second round of the 1968 Major League Baseball draft out of Winters High School (California) and he played six seasons in the major leagues between 1971 and 1978. He batted .254 (157/618) with 68 runs, 6 home runs and 76 RBIs.

He was traded with Buddy Harris from the Astros to the New York Mets for Tommie Agee at the Winter Meetings on November 27, 1972.

He currently resides in Yolo County, in Northern California.

Chiles is a cousin of hall of famer George Kelly and Ren Kelly. He is also a distant cousin of former player Bill Lange.
