= Chris Arnold (baseball) =

American baseball player (born 1947)

- Infielder
- Born: November 6, 1947 (age 78); Long Beach, California, U.S.
- Batted: Right Threw: Right

MLB debut
- September 7, 1971, for the San Francisco Giants

Last MLB appearance
- October 2, 1976, for the San Francisco Giants

MLB statistics
- Batting average: .237
- Home runs: 4
- Runs batted in: 51
- Stats at Baseball Reference

Teams
- San Francisco Giants (1971–1976); Kintetsu Buffaloes (1978–1980)

Christopher Paul Arnold (born November 6, 1947) is an American former infielder in Major League Baseball. He was drafted by the San Francisco Giants in the 11th round of the 1965 Major League Baseball draft, and played for the Giants from 1971 to 1976.

Arnold graduated from Arcadia High School in Arcadia, California.

Arnold was a versatile utility man. When in the field, he played the majority of the time at second base and third base, with a few games at catcher, shortstop, outfield, and first base. He was most often, however, used as a pinch hitter during his major league career. His personal high for playing time was during the 1974 season, when he was in 78 games and made 192 plate appearances.

Two of Arnold's four career home runs came against Hall of Famers. One came in his third major league at bat, against Phil Niekro on September 10, 1971. The other came against Steve Carlton on May 1, 1974. One of the other two was a pinch-hit grand slam with two out in the bottom of the 9th inning during a comeback victory against the Pittsburgh Pirates on May 1, 1973.

Arnold finished his MLB career with a lifetime batting average of .237, 4 home runs, 51 RBI, and 47 runs scored in 273 ballgames. He later played three seasons with the Kintetsu Buffaloes in Japan, batting .274 with 43 home runs and 174 RBI.

Today, Arnold runs a sports agency, Professional Sports International, out of his home in Denver, Colorado and has a wife and two daughters.
