= Jimmy Rosario =

Puerto Rican baseball player (born 1945)

- Center fielder
- Born: May 5, 1945; Bayamón, Puerto Rico
- Batted: Both Threw: Right

Professional debut
- MLB: April 8, 1971, for the San Francisco Giants
- NPB: 1975, for the Lotte Orions

Last appearance
- MLB: June 21, 1976, for the Milwaukee Brewers
- NPB: 1977, for the Crown Lighter Lions

MLB statistics
- Batting average: .216
- Home runs: 1
- Runs batted in: 18
- Stolen bases: 8
- Stats at Baseball Reference

Teams
- San Francisco Giants (1971–1972); Lotte Orions (1975); Milwaukee Brewers (1976); Crown Lighter Lions (1977)

Jimmy Rosario (born Angel Ramon Ferrer Rosario on May 5, 1945) is a Puerto Rican former Major League Baseball center fielder. He played for the San Francisco Giants and the Milwaukee Brewers between 1971 and 1976.

== Career ==
Rosario was signed as a free agent by the San Francisco Giants in 1965 and played two seasons with the team. After being released by the Giants in 1975, he signed with the Milwaukee Brewers and appeared at the Major League level with them in 1976.

== Fielding ==
Defensively, Rosario handled 172 total chances (171 putouts and 1 assist) without committing an error across 583 innings as an outfielder, finishing with a perfect 1.000 fielding percentage.

== See also ==
- List of Major League Baseball players from Puerto Rico
