= Frank Duffy (baseball) =

American baseball player (born 1946)

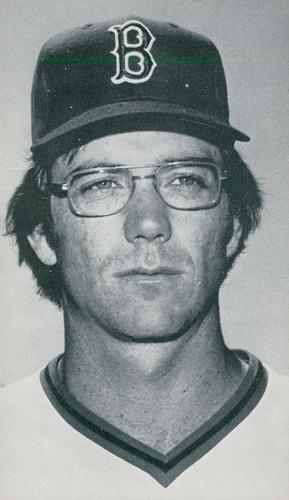
- Shortstop
- Born: October 14, 1946 (age 79); Oakland, California, U.S.
- Batted: Right Threw: Right

MLB debut
- September 4, 1970, for the Cincinnati Reds

Last MLB appearance
- May 11, 1979, for the Boston Red Sox

MLB statistics
- Batting average: .232
- Home runs: 26
- Runs batted in: 240
- Stats at Baseball Reference

Teams
- Cincinnati Reds (1970–1971); San Francisco Giants (1971); Cleveland Indians (1972–1977); Boston Red Sox (1978–1979)

Frank Thomas Duffy (born October 14, 1946) is an American former professional baseball player. He played in Major League Baseball as a shortstop from 1970 through 1979 for the Cincinnati Reds, San Francisco Giants, Cleveland Indians and the Boston Red Sox.

A 1964 graduate of Turlock High School who also starred in basketball and football, Duffy was inducted into the school's Athletics Hall of Fame in 1997.

Duffy is probably most remembered for being a part of what is considered a lopsided trade between the Reds and Giants. On May 29, 1971, Duffy was traded along with pitcher Vern Geishert for young outfielder George Foster. Geishert, who had played briefly in the majors in 1969, never played in the majors again, while Foster developed into a feared slugger and an important cog in "The Big Red Machine", the Reds' dynastic team of the first half of the 1970s.

Later that same year, Duffy was part of a second trade that is almost as infamous. On November 29, exactly seven months after the previous trade, Duffy was traded with pitcher Gaylord Perry to the Indians, with the Giants receiving pitcher Sam McDowell. In this case, Duffy was on the other side of the lopsided deal, as he went on to be the Indians' starting shortstop for several years, leading the league in fielding percentage for shortstops in 1973, and placing in the top 5 for that same stat for his first 5 years in Cleveland. Perry went on to win 20 games three times, receive two Cy Young Awards, and eventually earn a place in the Hall of Fame, while McDowell pitched for four seasons, winning 10 games in 1972 but only 9 in the next three seasons combined.

Duffy was dealt to the Red Sox for Rick Kreuger on March 23, 1978. He became expendable after his unexpected re-signing just before the start of spring training created a glut of shortstops for the Indians who had acquired Tom Veryzer and Dave Rosello during the off-season. His time in Boston was most noted for his quote "The team gets off a plane and twenty-five players go off in twenty-five different cabs," an indictment of his teammates' egocentric discord that resulted in their inability to cope with adversity during the Red Sox's 1978 American League East pennant race collapse. Duffy appeared in only 70 games with the Red Sox who released him on May 22, 1979.

Duffy retired and is a resident of Tucson, Arizona.

== Sources ==
- Career statistics from Baseball Reference · Baseball Reference (Minors) · Retrosheet · Baseball Almanac
