= Rich Hacker =

American baseball player (1947–2020)

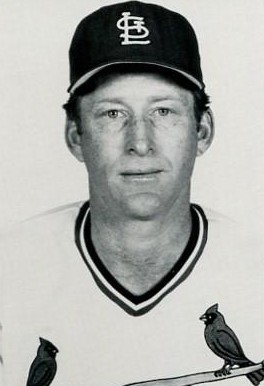
- Shortstop
- Born: October 6, 1947; Belleville, Illinois, U.S.
- Died: April 22, 2020 (aged 72); Fairview Heights, Illinois, U.S.
- Batted: Both Threw: Right

MLB debut
- July 2, 1971, for the Montreal Expos

Last MLB appearance
- September 29, 1971, for the Montreal Expos

MLB statistics
- Batting average: .121
- Home runs: 0
- Runs batted in: 2
- Stats at Baseball Reference

Teams
- As player: Montreal Expos (1971); As coach: St. Louis Cardinals (1986–1990); Toronto Blue Jays (1991–1993)

Career highlights and awards
- 2× World Series champion (1992, 1993)

Richard Warren Hacker (October 6, 1947 – April 22, 2020) was an American Major League Baseball player, base coach and scout. Hacker played 16 games for the Montreal Expos in the 1971 season as a shortstop. He had a .121 batting average, with four hits in 33 at-bats. Hacker attended Southern Illinois University. After his playing career Hacker became a coach.

== Coaching ==
Hacker was a base coach in the Major Leagues from 1986 to 1993, coaching for the St. Louis Cardinals from 1986 to 1990 and the Toronto Blue Jays from 1991 to 1993. Hacker coached first base for the Cardinals from 1986–87 and third base from 1988–90. He was a coach for Hall of Fame manager Whitey Herzog who also attended New Athens High School in New Athens, Illinois. Hacker was the third base coach for the Blue Jays from 1991–93. He coached in two World Series (1987 and 1992) and was on the Blue Jays bench for a third (1993). He also coached in the 1988 Major League Baseball All-Star Game.

Hacker was seriously hurt in a car accident on the Martin Luther King Bridge in St. Louis in July 1993, when he collided with a driver who was racing. The accident ended his career. During his recovery from injury he remained a member of the Blue Jays coaching staff, but was transferred to off-field work such as creating hitting charts of opposing teams. He was replaced as third base coach by Nick Leyva.

== Personal life ==
Hacker and his wife Kathryn lived in Belleville, Illinois, and had three grown children. He remained an active hunter and amateur baseball scout. He was a member of the New Athens High School Hall of Fame. Hacker's uncle was former Major Leaguer, Warren Hacker. Hacker died on April 22, 2020, in Fairview Heights, Illinois, due to leukemia.

== See also ==
- List of St. Louis Cardinals coaches
