= Dave McDonald (baseball) =

American baseball player (1943–2017)

- Pinch hitter / First baseman
- Born: May 20, 1943; New Albany, Indiana, U.S.
- Died: May 19, 2017 (aged 73); Pompano Beach, Florida, U.S.
- Batted: Left Threw: Right

MLB debut
- September 15, 1969, for the New York Yankees

Last MLB appearance
- September 26, 1971, for the Montreal Expos

MLB statistics
- Batting average: .145
- Home runs: 1
- Runs batted in: 6
- Stats at Baseball Reference

Teams
- New York Yankees (1969); Montreal Expos (1971)

David Bruce McDonald (May 20, 1943 – May 19, 2017) was an American professional baseball player. He was a first baseman who appeared in 33 Major League Baseball games as a member of the 1969 New York Yankees and 1971 Montreal Expos. He batted left-handed, threw right-handed and was listed as 6 feet 3 inches (1.91 m) tall and 215 pounds (98 kg).

== Career ==
Born in New Albany, Indiana, McDonald graduated from high school in Grand Island, Nebraska, and attended the University of Nebraska–Lincoln. He was signed by the New York Yankees in 1962 and spent eight seasons in the Yankees' farm system before his September 1969 trial with the MLB Yankees. In nine games, six as the Bronx Bombers' starting first baseman and three as a pinch hitter, he collected three hits and batted .217. He was traded to Montreal at the outset of the 1970 campaign and spent the year at Triple-A. The Expos called him up in June of 1971, and in his second game in a Montreal uniform, he hit his only big-league home run (off Rick Wise of the Philadelphia Phillies at Jarry Park). He also added a single and a sacrifice fly, for two runs batted in, as Montreal triumphed, 4–2. But McDonald only mustered two more hits with the Expos for the rest of the year—also against the Phillies—and batted only .103.

He spent the remainder of his pro career in the minor leagues, retiring in 1974.

McDonald registered a total of nine hits, including three doubles and his lone home run, in 62 big-league at bats (.145) with six runs batted in. He was featured on the same baseball card as Thurman Munson, under the title 1970 ROOKIE STARS YANKEES.

== Death ==
He died one day before turning 74 on May 19, 2017.
