= Stan Swanson =

American baseball player

- Outfielder
- Born: May 19, 1944; Yuba City, California, U.S.
- Died: September 1, 2017 (aged 73); Fallbrook, California, U.S.
- Batted: Right Threw: Right

MLB debut
- June 23, 1971, for the Montreal Expos

Last MLB appearance
- September 28, 1971, for the Montreal Expos

MLB statistics
- Batting average: .245
- Home runs: 2
- Runs batted in: 11

Teams
- Montreal Expos (1971)

Stanley Lawrence Swanson (May 19, 1944 – September 1, 2017) was an American baseball player who played for the Montreal Expos in 1971. He was born on May 19, 1944, in Yuba City, California. He was originally signed as a free agent by the Cincinnati Reds in 1963.
