= Jim Qualls =

American baseball player (born 1946)

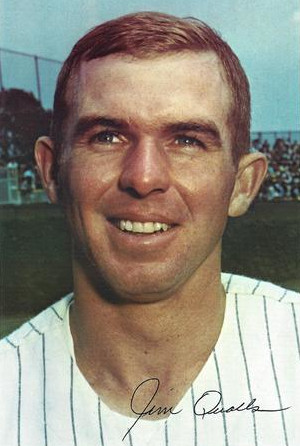
- Qualls in 1969 with the Chicago Cubs
- Outfielder
- Born: October 9, 1946 (age 78); Exeter, California, U.S.
- Batted: Switch Threw: Right

MLB debut
- April 10, 1969, for the Chicago Cubs

Last MLB appearance
- May 28, 1972, for the Chicago White Sox

MLB statistics
- Batting average: .223
- Home runs: 0
- Runs batted in: 10

NPB statistics
- Batting average: .252
- Home runs: 15
- Runs batted in: 71
- Stats at Baseball Reference

Teams
- Chicago Cubs (1969); Montreal Expos (1970); Chicago White Sox (1972); Kintetsu Buffaloes (1972–1973)

James Robert Qualls (born October 9, 1946) is an American former professional baseball player who appeared in 63 games in Major League Baseball as an outfielder and pinch-hitting specialist for the Chicago Cubs (1969), Montreal Expos (1970) and Chicago White Sox (1972). He also played in two seasons in Japan (1972–1973) for the Kintetsu Buffaloes. Born in Exeter, California, he was a switch-hitter who threw right-handed; he stood 5 feet 10 inches (1.78 m) tall and weighed 158 pounds (72 kg).

Qualls began his pro career in the Cubs' organization in 1964 after graduating from Tulare Western High School. After five years in the minor leagues, he made the MLB roster in 1969 and played 43 games for the Cubs, most of them in utility and pinch-hitting roles. He is best remembered for hitting a one-out single in the top of the ninth inning to break up Tom Seaver's bid for a perfect game in the New York Mets' 4–0 victory over the Cubs at Shea Stadium on July 9, 1969.

Qualls collected 31 hits during his MLB career, including five doubles and three triples, batting .223 with ten runs batted in. He did not hit any MLB home runs. In NPB, he hit .252 with 15 home runs in 162 games played with Kintetsu.
