= 1973 Philadelphia Phillies season =

Major League Baseball season

1973 Philadelphia Phillies
- League: National League
- Division: East
- Ballpark: Veterans Stadium
- City: Philadelphia
- Owners: R. R. M. "Ruly" Carpenter III
- General managers: Paul Owens
- Managers: Danny Ozark
- Television: WPHL-TV
- Radio: WCAU (By Saam, Harry Kalas, Richie Ashburn)

The 1973 Philadelphia Phillies season was the 91st season in the history of the franchise. The team, managed by Danny Ozark, played their third season at Veterans Stadium and finished last in the National League East, 11 1/2 games behind the Mets.

== Offseason ==
- October 31, 1972: Don Money, John Vukovich, and Bill Champion were traded by the Phillies to the Milwaukee Brewers for Jim Lonborg, Ken Brett, Ken Sanders, and Earl Stephenson.
- November 30, 1972: Oscar Gamble and Roger Freed were traded by the Phillies to the Cleveland Indians for Del Unser and Terry Wedgewood (minors).
- November 30, 1972: Joe Lis, Ken Sanders and Ken Reynolds were traded by the Phillies to the Minnesota Twins for César Tovar.
- January 10, 1973: Rick Bosetti was drafted by the Phillies in the 7th round of the 1973 Major League Baseball draft. Player signed January 17, 1973.

== Regular season ==
Steve Carlton, the highest paid pitcher in the game at $165,000, never recovered from a spring training illness and went 13–20. Pitchers Jim Lonborg and Ken Brett, both obtained in a trade with the Milwaukee Brewers, won 13 games each, as did Wayne Twitchell, whose 2.50 ERA was third in the league. Left fielder Greg Luzinski led the team with 29 home runs, 97 RBIs, and 76 runs, and hit .285. In his rookie season, Mike Schmidt hit just .196 and struck out 136 times in 367 at-bats.

=== Season standings ===
NL East
Team	W	L	Pct.	GB	Home	Road
New York Mets	82	79	.509	—	43‍–‍38	39‍–‍41
St. Louis Cardinals	81	81	.500	1½	43‍–‍38	38‍–‍43
Pittsburgh Pirates	80	82	.494	2½	41‍–‍40	39‍–‍42
Montreal Expos	79	83	.488	3½	43‍–‍38	36‍–‍45
Chicago Cubs	77	84	.478	5	41‍–‍39	36‍–‍45
Philadelphia Phillies	71	91	.438	11½	38‍–‍43	33‍–‍48

=== Record vs. opponents ===
1973 National League record Sources:
Team	ATL	CHC	CIN	HOU	LAD	MON	NYM	PHI	PIT	SD	SF	STL
Atlanta	—	7–5	5–13	11–7	2–15–1	6–6	6–6	6–6	7–5	12–6	8–10	6–6
Chicago	5–7	—	8–4	6–6	5–7	9–9	10–7	10–8	6–12	7–5	2–10	9–9
Cincinnati	13–5	4–8	—	11–7	11–7	8–4	8–4	8–4	7–5	13–5	10–8	6–6
Houston	7–11	6–6	7–11	—	11–7	6–6	6–6	7–5	6–6	10–8	11–7	5–7
Los Angeles	15–2–1	7–5	7–11	7–11	—	7–5	7–5	9–3	10–2	9–9	9–9	8–4
Montreal	6–6	9–9	4–8	6–6	5–7	—	9–9	13–5	6–12	7–5	6–6	8–10
New York	6–6	7–10	4–8	6–6	5–7	9–9	—	9–9	13–5	8–4	5–7	10–8
Philadelphia	6–6	8–10	4–8	5–7	3–9	5–13	9–9	—	8–10	9–3	5–7	9–9
Pittsburgh	5–7	12–6	5–7	6–6	2–10	12–6	5–13	10–8	—	8–4	5–7	10–8
San Diego	6–12	5–7	5–13	8–10	9–9	5–7	4–8	3–9	4–8	—	7–11	4–8
San Francisco	10–8	10–2	8–10	7–11	9–9	6–6	7–5	7–5	7–5	11–7	—	6–6
St. Louis	6–6	9–9	6–6	7–5	4–8	10–8	8–10	9–9	8–10	8–4	6–6	—

=== Notable transactions ===
- June 5, 1973: 1973 Major League Baseball draft
  - Todd Cruz was drafted by the Phillies in the 2nd round. Player signed June 18, 1973.
  - Dan Boitano was drafted by the Phillies in the 1st round (11th pick) of the secondary phase. Player signed June 19, 1973.
- September 11, 1973: Willie Hernández was signed as an amateur free agent by the Phillies.

=== Game log ===
Legend
	Phillies win
	Phillies loss
	Postponement
**Bold**	Phillies team member

1973 Game Log
Overall Record: 71–91
April (9–9)

#	Date	Opponent	Score	Win	Loss	Save	Attendance	Record
1	April 6	@ Mets	0–3	Tom Seaver (1–0)	**Steve Carlton** (0–1)	Tug McGraw (1)	27,326	0–1
2	April 7	@ Mets	2–3	Jon Matlack (1–0)	**Dick Selma** (0–1)	None	18,738	0–2
–	April 8	@ Mets	Postponed (rain); Makeup: June 27 as a traditional double-header					
3	April 10	Expos	7–5	**Steve Carlton** (1–1)	Mike Torrez (0–2)	None	40,809	1–2
4	April 12	Expos	3–5	Balor Moore (1–0)	**Jim Lonborg** (0–1)	Mike Marshall (1)	5,130	1–3
5	April 13	Mets	7–1	**Larry Christenson** (1–0)	Jon Matlack (1–1)	None	7,127	2–3
6	April 14	Mets	7–3	**Steve Carlton** (2–1)	Jim McAndrew (0–1)	None	11,063	3–3
7	April 15	Mets	1–2	Harry Parker (1–0)	**Jim Lonborg** (0–2)	Tug McGraw (2)	30,718	3–4
8	April 17	@ Expos	9–6	**Dick Selma** (1–1)	Mike Marshall (0–2)	**Bill Wilson** (1)	7,831	4–4
9	April 18	@ Expos	1–2	Steve Renko (1–0)	**Steve Carlton** (2–2)	None	13,728	4–5
10	April 19	@ Expos	5–6	Mike Torrez (1–3)	**Larry Christenson** (1–1)	Tom Walker (1)	12,359	4–6
11	April 21	Cardinals	7–4	**Jim Lonborg** (1–2)	Scipio Spinks (0–3)	**Mac Scarce** (1)	8,031	5–6
12	April 22 (1)	Cardinals	4–2	**Steve Carlton** (3–2)	Reggie Cleveland (0–2)	None	see 2nd game	6–6
13	April 22 (2)	Cardinals	2–1	**Bill Wilson** (1–0)	Bob Gibson (0–2)	None	18,042	7–6
14	April 24	@ Braves	2–11	Carl Morton (1–1)	**Larry Christenson** (1–2)	Ron Schueler (1)	3,405	7–7
15	April 25	@ Braves	2–5	Gary Gentry (2–2)	**Jim Lonborg** (1–3)	Phil Niekro (1)	2,866	7–8
16	April 27	@ Reds	3–1	**Steve Carlton** (4–2)	Ross Grimsley (3–1)	None	13,690	8–8
17	April 28	@ Reds	1–0	**Dick Ruthven** (1–0)	Don Gullett (3–2)	**Mac Scarce** (2)	14,126	9–8
18	April 29	@ Reds	0–8	Jack Billingham (4–0)	**Larry Christenson** (1–3)	None	39,191	9–9

May (10–18)

#	Date	Opponent	Score	Win	Loss	Save	Attendance	Record
19	May 1	Astros	0–3	Jerry Reuss (4–1)	**Steve Carlton** (4–3)	None	10,333	9–10
20	May 2	Astros	4–9	Dave Roberts (2–1)	**Jim Lonborg** (1–4)	Jim Ray (2)	8,101	9–11
21	May 4	Braves	5–4 (20)	**Jim Lonborg** (2–4)	Tom Kelley (0–1)	None	10,158	10–11
22	May 5	Braves	0–7	Carl Morton (2–2)	**Steve Carlton** (4–4)	None	11,368	10–12
23	May 6	Braves	1–3	Gary Gentry (3–2)	**Mac Scarce** (0–1)	None	60,120	10–13
24	May 7	Reds	3–2 (14)	**Barry Lersch** (1–0)	Pedro Borbón (0–2)	None	7,886	11–13
25	May 8	Reds	1–7	Jack Billingham (5–1)	**Dick Ruthven** (1–1)	None	6,196	11–14
26	May 9	Reds	7–9	Tom Hall (3–1)	**Barry Lersch** (1–1)	None	11,992	11–15
27	May 11	@ Cubs	3–4	Bob Locker (4–1)	**Ken Brett** (0–1)	Jack Aker (6)	5,514	11–16
28	May 12	@ Cubs	1–3	Rick Reuschel (3–2)	**Wayne Twitchell** (0–1)	None	15,095	11–17
29	May 13 (1)	@ Cubs	2–4	Ferguson Jenkins (3–3)	**Steve Carlton** (4–5)	None	see 2nd game	11–18
30	May 13 (2)	@ Cubs	3–9	Bill Bonham (2–0)	**Dick Ruthven** (1–2)	None	19,242	11–19
31	May 14	@ Cardinals	10–5	**Ken Brett** (1–1)	Reggie Cleveland (2–4)	**Mac Scarce** (3)	7,677	12–19
32	May 15	@ Cardinals	4–8	Rick Wise (4–2)	**Bucky Brandon** (0–1)	None	7,368	12–20
33	May 16	@ Pirates	5–2	**Wayne Twitchell** (1–1)	Dock Ellis (3–4)	**Mac Scarce** (4)	6,885	13–20
34	May 17	@ Pirates	2–5	Bob Moose (3–3)	**Steve Carlton** (4–6)	Jim Rooker (4)	6,885	13–21
35	May 18	Cubs	2–9	Ferguson Jenkins (4–3)	**Dick Ruthven** (1–3)	None	10,067	13–22
36	May 19 (1)	Cubs	3–0	**Ken Brett** (2–1)	Burt Hooton (5–3)	None	see 2nd game	14–22
37	May 19 (2)	Cubs	6–7	Bob Locker (5–1)	**Jim Lonborg** (2–5)	Jack Aker (8)	27,569	14–23
–	May 20	Cubs	Postponed (rain); Makeup: July 31 as a traditional double-header					
38	May 21	Pirates	4–5	Steve Blass (2–2)	**Mac Scarce** (0–2)	Dave Giusti (3)	9,010	14–24
39	May 22	Pirates	7–4	**Wayne Twitchell** (2–1)	Dock Ellis (3–5)	None	11,617	15–24
–	May 23	Pirates	Postponed (rain); Makeup: August 4 as a traditional double-header					
40	May 25	@ Padres	8–1	**Ken Brett** (3–1)	Fred Norman (1–6)	None	26,615	16–24
41	May 26	@ Padres	4–0	**Steve Carlton** (5–6)	Mike Caldwell (2–6)	None	7,260	17–24
42	May 27 (1)	@ Padres	4–3	**Wayne Twitchell** (3–1)	Bill Greif (3–5)	**Barry Lersch** (1)	see 2nd game	18–24
43	May 27 (2)	@ Padres	6–4	**Jim Lonborg** (3–5)	Steve Arlin (2–2)	**Mac Scarce** (5)	9,983	19–24
44	May 28	@ Dodgers	1–5	Andy Messersmith (5–4)	**Dick Ruthven** (1–4)	None	15,300	19–25
45	May 29	@ Dodgers	3–9	Tommy John (4–2)	**Ken Brett** (3–2)	Jim Brewer (5)	12,350	19–26
46	May 30	@ Dodgers	4–9	Claude Osteen (5–3)	**Steve Carlton** (5–7)	None	15,462	19–27

June (16–13)

#	Date	Opponent	Score	Win	Loss	Save	Attendance	Record
47	June 1	@ Giants	1–2	Ron Bryant (8–3)	**Wayne Twitchell** (3–2)	None	5,359	19–28
48	June 2	@ Giants	7–11	Charlie Williams (1–0)	**Jim Lonborg** (3–6)	Elías Sosa (3)	5,949	19–29
49	June 3	@ Giants	4–5	Charlie Williams (2–0)	**Bill Wilson** (1–1)	None	15,483	19–30
50	June 4	@ Astros	0–7	Dave Roberts (6–3)	**Larry Christenson** (1–4)	None	13,291	19–31
51	June 5	@ Astros	4–0	**Wayne Twitchell** (4–2)	Jerry Reuss (6–4)	None	12,912	20–31
52	June 6	@ Astros	3–4 (10)	Jim Crawford (2–2)	**Barry Lersch** (1–2)	None	13,081	20–32
53	June 8	Padres	5–1	**Steve Carlton** (6–7)	Steve Arlin (2–3)	None	18,096	21–32
54	June 9	Padres	4–1	**Ken Brett** (4–2)	Bill Greif (4–7)	**Bill Wilson** (2)	15,226	22–32
55	June 10	Padres	11–0	**Wayne Twitchell** (5–2)	Clay Kirby (2–7)	None	27,863	23–32
56	June 11	Dodgers	3–5	Don Sutton (8–4)	**Dick Ruthven** (1–5)	Pete Richert (6)	10,635	23–33
57	June 12	Dodgers	6–8	Doug Rau (1–1)	**Mac Scarce** (0–3)	Jim Brewer (6)	16,218	23–34
58	June 13	Dodgers	16–3	**Ken Brett** (5–2)	Tommy John (5–3)	None	13,068	24–34
59	June 15	Giants	3–4 (10)	Ron Bryant (11–3)	**Bill Wilson** (1–2)	Elías Sosa (4)	23,585	24–35
60	June 16	Giants	5–4	**Barry Lersch** (2–2)	Jim Barr (4–7)	None	25,615	25–35
61	June 17	Giants	11–7	**Steve Carlton** (7–7)	Tom Bradley (5–5)	**Bill Wilson** (3)	25,299	26–35
62	June 18	Mets	9–6	**Ken Brett** (6–2)	Jim McAndrew (3–5)	None	13,190	27–35
63	June 19	Mets	6–1	**Jim Lonborg** (4–6)	Harry Parker (5–1)	**Mac Scarce** (6)	17,481	28–35
64	June 20	Mets	4–3	**Wayne Twitchell** (6–2)	Jon Matlack (4–9)	None	24,302	29–35
65	June 22	@ Expos	2–4	Mike Torrez (4–5)	**Steve Carlton** (7–8)	None	11,707	29–36
66	June 23	@ Expos	7–2	**Ken Brett** (7–2)	Balor Moore (4–7)	None	18,385	30–36
67	June 24	@ Expos	5–4	**Jim Lonborg** (5–6)	Steve Renko (6–4)	**Bill Wilson** (4)	17,776	31–36
68	June 25	Cardinals	7–6	**Bucky Brandon** (1–1)	Diego Seguí (3–3)	**Mac Scarce** (7)	16,570	32–36
69	June 26 (1)	Cardinals	10–3	**Dick Ruthven** (2–5)	Bob Gibson (7–7)	**Mac Scarce** (8)	see 2nd game	33–36
70	June 26 (2)	Cardinals	4–5 (11)	Wayne Granger (2–2)	**Bucky Brandon** (1–2)	Orlando Peña (2)	40,492	33–37
71	June 27 (1)	@ Mets	6–7	George Stone (4–2)	**Barry Lersch** (2–3)	Buzz Capra (1)	see 2nd game	33–38
72	June 27 (2)	@ Mets	7–1	**Mike Wallace** (1–0)	Harry Parker (5–2)	None	31,095	34–38
73	June 28	@ Mets	11–4	**Jim Lonborg** (6–6)	Jim McAndrew (3–6)	None	9,965	35–38
74	June 29	@ Cardinals	1–2 (10)	Orlando Peña (2–1)	**Mac Scarce** (0–4)	None	13,743	35–39
75	June 30	@ Cardinals	8–9	Alan Foster (5–5)	**Steve Carlton** (7–9)	Diego Seguí (10)	45,869	35–40

July (14–17)

#	Date	Opponent	Score	Win	Loss	Save	Attendance	Record
76	July 1	@ Cardinals	1–0	**Dick Ruthven** (3–5)	Bob Gibson (7–8)	None	15,477	36–40
77	July 2	@ Cardinals	4–7	Reggie Cleveland (9–5)	**Mike Wallace** (1–1)	Orlando Peña (3)	13,096	36–41
78	July 3	@ Cubs	8–2	**Jim Lonborg** (7–6)	Milt Pappas (5–6)	None	18,849	37–41
79	July 4	@ Cubs	2–3 (10)	Jack Aker (4–5)	**Bill Wilson** (1–3)	None	22,141	37–42
80	July 5	@ Cubs	7–4	**Steve Carlton** (8–9)	Rick Reuschel (9–5)	None	24,849	38–42
81	July 6	Reds	2–8	Fred Norman (6–8)	**Dick Ruthven** (3–6)	None	58,294	38–43
82	July 7	Reds	4–5	Jim McGlothlin (3–2)	**Jim Lonborg** (7–7)	Don Gullett (1)	31,250	38–44
83	July 8	Reds	0–4	Jack Billingham (12–5)	**Wayne Twitchell** (6–3)	None	36,165	38–45
84	July 9	Braves	3–6 (10)	Tom House (1–1)	**Barry Lersch** (2–4)	Joe Hoerner (2)	18,804	38–46
85	July 10	Braves	2–4	Roric Harrison (5–2)	**Dick Ruthven** (3–7)	Adrian Devine (2)	22,297	38–47
86	July 11	Braves	6–5	**Ken Brett** (8–2)	Jimmy Freeman (0–2)	None	18,117	39–47
87	July 12	Astros	6–7	Juan Pizarro (1–1)	**Barry Lersch** (2–5)	None	13,110	39–48
88	July 13	Astros	5–3	**Wayne Twitchell** (7–3)	Don Wilson (6–10)	None	19,087	40–48
89	July 14	Astros	7–0	**Steve Carlton** (9–9)	Jerry Reuss (11–7)	None	25,062	41–48
90	July 15	Astros	0–2^{^{[a]}} (6)	Dave Roberts (9–7)	**Dick Ruthven** (3–8)	None	20,648	41–49
91	July 16	@ Reds	0–1	Fred Norman (7–9)	**Ken Brett** (8–3)	None	16,457	41–50
92	July 17	@ Reds	2–1	**Jim Lonborg** (8–7)	Jack Billingham (13–6)	None	19,549	42–50
93	July 18	@ Reds	3–7	Tom Hall (6–4)	**Steve Carlton** (9–10)	Clay Carroll (7)	17,429	42–51
94	July 20	@ Braves	6–4	**Wayne Twitchell** (8–3)	Phil Niekro (9–5)	**Dick Ruthven** (1)	9,231	43–51
95	July 21	@ Braves	8–4	**Ken Brett** (9–3)	Ron Schueler (5–5)	**Bucky Brandon** (1)	16,236	44–51
96	July 22 (1)	@ Braves	6–5	**Dick Ruthven** (4–8)	Max León (0–1)	None	see 2nd game	45–51
97	July 22 (2)	@ Braves	5–1	**Jim Lonborg** (9–7)	Carl Morton (8–7)	**Bucky Brandon** (2)	18,788	46–51
–	July 24	**1973 Major League Baseball All-Star Game at Royals Stadium in Kansas City**						
98	July 26 (1)	Expos	0–4	Steve Rogers (1–0)	**Steve Carlton** (9–11)	None	see 2nd game	46–52
99	July 26 (2)	Expos	1–5	Steve Renko (10–6)	**Ken Brett** (9–4)	Mike Marshall (19)	34,459	46–53
100	July 27	Expos	4–5	Tom Walker (4–4)	**Bucky Brandon** (1–3)	Mike Marshall (20)	18,254	46–54
101	July 28	@ Pirates	5–0	**Wayne Twitchell** (9–3)	Jim Rooker (4–3)	None	14,630	47–54
102	July 29 (1)	@ Pirates	2–5	Ramón Hernández (3–2)	**Dick Ruthven** (4–9)	None	see 2nd game	47–55
103	July 29 (2)	@ Pirates	2–5	Luke Walker (7–8)	**Barry Lersch** (2–6)	Dave Giusti (13)	26,947	47–56
104	July 30	@ Pirates	1–0	**Steve Carlton** (10–11)	Bob Moose (6–10)	None	17,220	48–56
105	July 31 (1)	Cubs	3–4	Ferguson Jenkins (10–9)	**Jim Lonborg** (9–8)	Bob Locker (10)	see 2nd game	48–57
106	July 31 (2)	Cubs	6–5	**Ken Brett** (10–4)	Milt Pappas (5–10)	None	37,003	49–57

August (13–15)

#	Date	Opponent	Score	Win	Loss	Save	Attendance	Record
107	August 1	Cubs	2–0	**Wayne Twitchell** (10–3)	Burt Hooton (9–9)	None	23,381	50–57
108	August 2	Cubs	4–1	**Dick Ruthven** (5–9)	Bill Bonham (4–2)	None	16,855	51–57
109	August 3	Pirates	1–3	John Morlan (1–0)	**Steve Carlton** (10–12)	Ramón Hernández (5)	24,152	51–58
110	August 4 (1)	Pirates	11–5	**Ken Brett** (11–4)	Luke Walker (7–9)	None	see 2nd game	52–58
111	August 4 (2)	Pirates	4–11	Ramón Hernández (4–2)	**Jim Lonborg** (9–9)	None	48,294	52–59
112	August 5	Pirates	1–4	Dock Ellis (11–9)	**Wayne Twitchell** (10–4)	Dave Giusti (14)	31,157	52–60
113	August 8	@ Padres	0–3	Bill Greif (7–12)	**Steve Carlton** (10–13)	None	2,696	52–61
114	August 9	@ Padres	9–10 (11)	Mike Corkins (4–7)	**Bucky Brandon** (1–4)	None	4,791	52–62
115	August 10	@ Dodgers	5–3	**Wayne Twitchell** (11–4)	Tommy John (11–7)	None	21,167	53–62
116	August 11	@ Dodgers	3–1	**Ken Brett** (12–4)	Al Downing (9–7)	None	50,557	54–62
117	August 12	@ Dodgers	1–2	Jim Brewer (5–4)	**Steve Carlton** (10–14)	None	22,281	54–63
118	August 14	@ Giants	4–3	**Jim Lonborg** (10–9)	Jim Barr (9–12)	None	4,128	55–63
119	August 15	@ Giants	2–11	Juan Marichal (10–8)	**Wayne Twitchell** (11–5)	None	4,089	55–64
120	August 16	@ Giants	1–2	Tom Bradley (10–11)	**Ken Brett** (12–5)	Elías Sosa (11)	4,519	55–65
121	August 17	@ Astros	8–3	**Steve Carlton** (11–14)	Don Wilson (9–13)	None	20,690	56–65
122	August 18	@ Astros	2–3	Jim Ray (6–1)	**Jim Lonborg** (10–10)	Ken Forsch (3)	23,047	56–66
123	August 19	@ Astros	5–3	**Wayne Twitchell** (12–5)	Jerry Reuss (13–9)	None	17,202	57–66
124	August 21	Padres	9–8	**George Culver** (5–4)	Mike Caldwell (5–14)	None	13,108	58–66
125	August 22	Padres	3–8	Steve Arlin (9–11)	**Steve Carlton** (11–15)	None	16,131	58–67
126	August 23	Padres	6–3	**Jim Lonborg** (11–10)	Clay Kirby (7–14)	None	10,601	59–67
127	August 24	Dodgers	0–3	Tommy John (12–7)	**Wayne Twitchell** (12–6)	None	30,671	59–68
128	August 25	Dodgers	4–6 (12)	Pete Richert (3–1)	**Mac Scarce** (0–5)	Doug Rau (2)	44,116	59–69
129	August 26	Dodgers	3–7	Don Sutton (16–8)	**Steve Carlton** (11–16)	Charlie Hough (2)	31,045	59–70
130	August 27	Giants	7–4	**Jim Lonborg** (12–10)	Jim Barr (10–14)	**Mac Scarce** (9)	17,027	60–70
131	August 28	Giants	1–0	**Wayne Twitchell** (13–6)	Juan Marichal (10–11)	None	20,363	61–70
132	August 29	Giants	1–3	Tom Bradley (12–11)	**Ken Brett** (12–6)	None	25,146	61–71
133	August 30	Expos	8–7	**George Culver** (6–4)	Mike Marshall (10–8)	None	10,220	62–71
134	August 31	Expos	2–5	Steve Rogers (6–3)	**Jim Lonborg** (12–11)	Mike Marshall (26)	14,171	62–72

September (9–19)

#	Date	Opponent	Score	Win	Loss	Save	Attendance	Record
135	September 1	Expos	5–11	Mike Marshall (11–8)	**Wayne Twitchell** (13–7)	None	14,217	62–73
136	September 2	Expos	0–12	Mike Torrez (9–11)	**Ken Brett** (12–7)	None	10,427	62–74
137	September 3 (1)	@ Mets	0–5	Jerry Koosman (12–14)	**Steve Carlton** (11–17)	None	see 2nd game	62–75
138	September 3 (2)	@ Mets	6–3	**Dick Ruthven** (6–9)	Craig Swan (0–1)	**Mac Scarce** (10)	30,748	63–75
139	September 4	@ Mets	1–7	Tom Seaver (16–8)	**Jim Lonborg** (12–12)	None	13,674	63–76
140	September 5	@ Mets	0–4	Ray Sadecki (4–3)	**Wayne Twitchell** (13–8)	Tug McGraw (16)	12,563	63–77
141	September 7	Pirates	8–10	Bob Johnson (4–1)	**Mac Scarce** (0–6)	Ramón Hernández (7)	15,233	63–78
142	September 8	Pirates	3–5	Bob Moose (10–11)	**Steve Carlton** (11–18)	Dave Giusti (17)	16,320	63–79
143	September 9	Pirates	8–7	**Mac Scarce** (1–6)	Bob Johnson (4–2)	None	14,356	64–79
144	September 11	Mets	6–4	**Jim Lonborg** (13–12)	Jerry Koosman (12–15)	None	8,159	65–79
145	September 12	Mets	2–3	Jon Matlack (13–15)	**Wayne Twitchell** (13–9)	Tug McGraw (19)	8,418	65–80
146	September 13	Mets	2–4 (12)	Tom Seaver (17–9)	**George Culver** (6–5)	Tug McGraw (20)	8,194	65–81
147	September 14	@ Expos	2–3	Chuck Taylor (2–0)	**Steve Carlton** (11–19)	None	13,458	65–82
148	September 15	@ Expos	4–5 (10)	Tom Walker (7–5)	**Mac Scarce** (1–7)	None	34,331	65–83
149	September 16	@ Expos	2–4	Steve Renko (14–10)	**Jim Lonborg** (13–13)	None	18,122	65–84
–	September 17	@ Cubs	Postponed (rain); Makeup: September 18 as a traditional double-header					
150	September 18 (1)	@ Cubs	5–2	**Barry Lersch** (3–6)	Bob Locker (9–6)	**Mac Scarce** (11)	see 2nd game	66–84
151	September 18 (2)	@ Cubs	2–3	Bill Bonham (6–4)	**Ken Brett** (12–8)	None	2,757	66–85
152	September 19	Cardinals	3–2	**Steve Carlton** (12–19)	Tom Murphy (3–7)	None	7,066	67–85
153	September 20	Cardinals	6–5	**Bucky Brandon** (2–4)	Alan Foster (13–9)	**Mac Scarce** (12)	6,155	68–85
154	September 21	Cardinals	3–12	Rick Wise (14–12)	**Jim Lonborg** (13–14)	None	13,158	68–86
155	September 22	Cubs	2–5 (10)	Bill Bonham (7–4)	**Mac Scarce** (1–8)	None	22,273	68–87
156	September 23	Cubs	9–7	**Ken Brett** (13–8)	Burt Hooton (14–15)	**Ron Diorio** (1)	9,991	69–87
157	September 25	@ Pirates	2–1	**Steve Carlton** (13–19)	Jim Rooker (9–6)	None	13,312	70–87
158	September 26	@ Pirates	2–13	Bob Moose (12–12)	**Jim Lonborg** (13–15)	Bob Johnson (4)	8,991	70–88
159	September 27	@ Pirates	3–2 (13)	**George Culver** (7–5)	Chris Zachary (0–1)	**Mike Wallace** (1)	11,577	71–88
160	September 28	@ Cardinals	0–3	Diego Seguí (7–6)	**Ken Brett** (13–9)	None	10,377	71–89
161	September 29	@ Cardinals	1–7	Bob Gibson (12–10)	**Steve Carlton** (13–20)	Orlando Peña (7)	16,104	71–90
162	September 30	@ Cardinals	1–3	Rick Wise (16–12)	**Jim Lonborg** (13–16)	None	16,108	71–91

^{^[a]}The July 15, 1973, game was protested by the Phillies in the middle of the sixth inning. The protest was later denied.

=== Roster ===
1973 Philadelphia Phillies
**Roster**
**Pitchers**: 30 Bucky Brandon; 31 Ken Brett; 32 Steve Carlton; 38 Larry Christenson; 35 George Culver; 21 Ron Diorio; 34 Barry Lersch; 41 Jim Lonborg; 40 Dick Ruthven; 44 Mac Scarce; 39 Dick Selma; 33 Wayne Twitchell; 39 Dave Wallace; 49 Mike Wallace; 37 Bill Wilson	**Catchers**: 8 Bob Boone; 18 Larry Cox; 6 Jim Essian; 9 Mike Ryan; **Infielders**: 10 Larry Bowa; 15 Denny Doyle; 5 Billy Grabarkewitz; 17 Terry Harmon; 14 Tommy Hutton; 11 Deron Johnson; 27 Willie Montañez; 16 José Pagán; 18 Craig Robinson; 20 Mike Schmidt; 12 César Tovar	**Outfielders**: 22 Mike Anderson; 19 Greg Luzinski; 24 Bill Robinson; 29,28 Mike Rogodzinski; 25 Del Unser	**Manager**: 3 Danny Ozark; **Coaches**: 1 Carroll Beringer; 2 Billy DeMars; 4 Ray Rippelmeyer; 7 Bobby Wine

== Player stats ==
=== Batting ===
==== Starters by position ====
Note: Pos = Position; G = Games played; AB = At bats; H = Hits; Avg. = Batting average; HR = Home runs; RBI = Runs batted in

Pos	Player	G	AB	H	Avg.	HR	RBI
C	Bob Boone	145	521	136	.261	10	61
1B	Willie Montañez	146	552	145	.263	11	65
2B	Denny Doyle	116	370	101	.273	3	26
SS	Larry Bowa	122	446	94	.211	0	23
3B	Mike Schmidt	132	367	72	.196	18	52
LF	Greg Luzinski	161	610	174	.285	29	97
CF	Del Unser	136	440	127	.289	11	52
RF	Bill Robinson	124	452	130	.288	25	65

==== Other batters ====
Note: G = Games played; AB = At bats; H = Hits; Avg. = Batting average; HR = Home runs; RBI = Runs batted in

Player	G	AB	H	Avg.	HR	RBI
César Tovar	97	328	88	.268	1	21
Tommy Hutton	106	247	65	.263	5	29
Mike Anderson	87	193	49	.254	9	28
Terry Harmon	72	148	31	.209	0	8
Craig Robinson	46	146	33	.226	0	7
Mike Rogodzinski	66	80	19	.238	2	7
José Pagán	46	78	16	.205	0	5
Mike Ryan	28	69	16	.232	1	5
Billy Grabarkewitz	25	66	19	.288	2	7
Deron Johnson	12	36	6	.167	1	5
Jim Essian	2	3	0	.000	0	0
Larry Cox	1	0	0	----	0	0

=== Pitching ===
==== Starting pitchers ====
Note: G = Games pitched; IP = Innings pitched; W = Wins; L = Losses; ERA = Earned run average; SO = Strikeouts

Player	G	IP	W	L	ERA	SO
Steve Carlton	40	293.1	13	20	3.90	223
Wayne Twitchell	34	223.1	13	9	2.50	169
Ken Brett	31	211.2	13	9	3.44	111
Jim Lonborg	38	199.1	13	16	4.88	106
Dick Ruthven	25	128.1	6	9	4.21	98
Larry Christenson	10	34.1	1	4	6.55	11

==== Other pitchers ====
Note: G = Games pitched; IP = Innings pitched; W = Wins; L = Losses; ERA = Earned run average; SO = Strikeouts

Player	G	IP	W	L	ERA	SO
Mike Wallace	20	33.1	1	1	3.78	20

==== Relief pitchers ====
Note: G = Games pitched; W = Wins; L = Losses; SV = Saves; ERA = Earned run average; SO = Strikeouts

Player	G	W	L	SV	ERA	SO
Mac Scarce	52	1	8	12	2.42	57
Bill Wilson	44	1	3	4	6.66	24
Barry Lersch	42	3	6	1	4.39	51
Bucky Brandon	36	2	4	2	5.43	25
Ron Diorio	23	0	0	1	2.33	11
George Culver	14	3	1	0	4.82	7
Dick Selma	6	1	1	0	5.63	4
Dave Wallace	4	0	0	0	22.09	2

== Farm system ==
Level	Team	League	Manager
AAA	Eugene Emeralds	Pacific Coast League	Jim Bunning
AA	Reading Phillies	Eastern League	Cal Emery
A	Rocky Mount Phillies	Carolina League	Bob Wellman
A	Spartanburg Phillies	Western Carolinas League	Howie Bedell
A-Short Season	Auburn Phillies	New York–Penn League	Harry Lloyd
Rookie	Pulaski Phillies	Appalachian League	Bob Wren

LEAGUE CHAMPIONS: Reading, Spartanburg, Auburn
