= 1973 Montreal Expos season =

1973 Montreal Expos
- League: National League
- Division: East
- Ballpark: Jarry Park
- City: Montreal
- Record: 79–83 (.488)
- Divisional place: 4th
- Owners: Charles Bronfman
- General managers: Jim Fanning
- Managers: Gene Mauch
- Television: CBC Television (Dave Van Horne, Duke Snider); Télévision de Radio-Canada (Jean-Pierre Roy, Guy Ferron)
- Radio: CFCF (English) (Dave Van Horne, Russ Taylor); CKAC (French) (Jean-Pierre Roy, Jacques Doucet)

The 1973 Montreal Expos season was the fifth season in the history of the franchise. The Expos finished in fourth place in the National League East with a record of 79–83, 3 1/2 games behind the New York Mets.

== Offseason ==
- January 10, 1973: Dan Boitano was drafted by the Expos in the 2nd round of the 1973 Major League Baseball draft (secondary phase), but did not sign.
- February 28, 1973: Carl Morton was traded by the Expos to the Atlanta Braves for Pat Jarvis.

== Spring training ==
After holding spring training at West Palm Beach Municipal Stadium in West Palm Beach, Florida, from 1969 to 1972, the Expos moved to City Island Ball Park in Daytona Beach for spring training in 1973. They trained at City Island Ball Park through 1980 before returning to West Palm Beach Municipal Stadium for the 1981 season.

== Regular season ==
=== Season standings ===
NL East
| Team | W | L | Pct. | GB | Home | Road |
|---|---|---|---|---|---|---|
| New York Mets | 82 | 79 | .509 | — | 43‍–‍38 | 39‍–‍41 |
| St. Louis Cardinals | 81 | 81 | .500 | 1½ | 43‍–‍38 | 38‍–‍43 |
| Pittsburgh Pirates | 80 | 82 | .494 | 2½ | 41‍–‍40 | 39‍–‍42 |
| Montreal Expos | 79 | 83 | .488 | 3½ | 43‍–‍38 | 36‍–‍45 |
| Chicago Cubs | 77 | 84 | .478 | 5 | 41‍–‍39 | 36‍–‍45 |
| Philadelphia Phillies | 71 | 91 | .438 | 11½ | 38‍–‍43 | 33‍–‍48 |

=== Record vs. opponents ===
1973 National League record Sources:
| Team | ATL | CHC | CIN | HOU | LAD | MON | NYM | PHI | PIT | SD | SF | STL |
|---|---|---|---|---|---|---|---|---|---|---|---|---|
| Atlanta | — | 7–5 | 5–13 | 11–7 | 2–15–1 | 6–6 | 6–6 | 6–6 | 7–5 | 12–6 | 8–10 | 6–6 |
| Chicago | 5–7 | — | 8–4 | 6–6 | 5–7 | 9–9 | 10–7 | 10–8 | 6–12 | 7–5 | 2–10 | 9–9 |
| Cincinnati | 13–5 | 4–8 | — | 11–7 | 11–7 | 8–4 | 8–4 | 8–4 | 7–5 | 13–5 | 10–8 | 6–6 |
| Houston | 7–11 | 6–6 | 7–11 | — | 11–7 | 6–6 | 6–6 | 7–5 | 6–6 | 10–8 | 11–7 | 5–7 |
| Los Angeles | 15–2–1 | 7–5 | 7–11 | 7–11 | — | 7–5 | 7–5 | 9–3 | 10–2 | 9–9 | 9–9 | 8–4 |
| Montreal | 6–6 | 9–9 | 4–8 | 6–6 | 5–7 | — | 9–9 | 13–5 | 6–12 | 7–5 | 6–6 | 8–10 |
| New York | 6–6 | 7–10 | 4–8 | 6–6 | 5–7 | 9–9 | — | 9–9 | 13–5 | 8–4 | 5–7 | 10–8 |
| Philadelphia | 6-6 | 8–10 | 4–8 | 5–7 | 3–9 | 5–13 | 9–9 | — | 8–10 | 9–3 | 5–7 | 9–9 |
| Pittsburgh | 5–7 | 12–6 | 5–7 | 6–6 | 2–10 | 12–6 | 5–13 | 10–8 | — | 8–4 | 5–7 | 10–8 |
| San Diego | 6–12 | 5–7 | 5–13 | 8–10 | 9–9 | 5–7 | 4–8 | 3–9 | 4–8 | — | 7–11 | 4–8 |
| San Francisco | 10–8 | 10–2 | 8–10 | 7–11 | 9–9 | 6–6 | 7–5 | 7–5 | 7–5 | 11–7 | — | 6–6 |
| St. Louis | 6–6 | 9–9 | 6–6 | 7–5 | 4–8 | 10–8 | 8–10 | 9–9 | 8–10 | 8–4 | 6–6 | — |

=== Notable transactions ===
- June 5, 1973: 1973 Major League Baseball draft
  - Jeff Reardon was drafted by the Expos in the 23rd round, but did not sign.
  - Tim Ireland was drafted by the Expos in the 25th round.
  - Warren Cromartie was drafted by the Expos in the 1st round (5th pick) of the Secondary Phase.
- August 13, 1973: Bernie Allen was purchased by the Expos from the New York Yankees.
- September 5, 1973: Coco Laboy was released by the Expos.

== Roster ==
1973 Montreal Expos
Roster
| Pitchers: 35 Craig Caskey; 42 Joe Gilbert; 34 Pat Jarvis; 28 Mike Marshall; 21 Ernie McAnally; 53 John Montague; 15 Balor Moore; 18 Steve Renko; 45 Steve Rogers; 25 Mickey Scott; 26 Bill Stoneman; 36 John Strohmayer; 36 Chuck Taylor; 24 Mike Torrez; 20 Tom Walker | Catchers: 12 John Boccabella; 22 Terry Humphrey; 7 Bob Stinson; Infielders: 9 Bernie Allen; 3 Bob Bailey; 23 Hal Breeden; 10,56 Jim Cox; 19 Tim Foli; 38 Pepe Frías; 33 Ron Hunt; 16 Mike Jorgensen; 39 Coco Laboy; 51 Larry Lintz | Outfielders: 48 Felipe Alou; 17 Curtis Brown; 8 Boots Day; 6 Ron Fairly; 2 Jim Lyttle; 11 Pepe Mangual; 5 Clyde Mashore; 17 Jorge Roque; 52 Tony Scott; 29 Ken Singleton; 43 Ron Woods; Other batters: 54 Barry Foote; 58 José Morales | Manager: 4 Gene Mauch; Coaches: 1 Dave Bristol (Third base); 14 Larry Doby (First base/Hitting); 32 Cal McLish (Pitching); 31 Jerry Zimmerman (Bullpen) |

== Player stats ==
=== Batting ===
==== Starters by position ====
Note: Pos = Position; G = Games played; AB = At bats; H = Hits; Avg. = Batting average; HR = Home runs; RBI = Runs batted in

| Pos | Player | G | AB | H | Avg. | HR | RBI |
|---|---|---|---|---|---|---|---|
| C | John Boccabella | 118 | 403 | 94 | .233 | 7 | 46 |
| 1B | Mike Jorgensen | 138 | 413 | 95 | .230 | 9 | 47 |
| 2B | Ron Hunt | 113 | 401 | 124 | .309 | 0 | 18 |
| 3B | Bob Bailey | 151 | 513 | 140 | .273 | 26 | 86 |
| SS | Tim Foli | 126 | 458 | 110 | .240 | 2 | 36 |
| LF | Ron Fairly | 142 | 413 | 123 | .298 | 17 | 49 |
| CF | Ron Woods | 135 | 318 | 73 | .230 | 3 | 31 |
| RF | Ken Singleton | 162 | 560 | 169 | .302 | 23 | 103 |

==== Other batters ====
Note: G = Games played; AB = At bats; H = Hits; Avg. = Batting average; HR = Home runs; RBI = Runs batted in

| Player | G | AB | H | Avg. | HR | RBI |
|---|---|---|---|---|---|---|
| Hal Breeden | 106 | 258 | 71 | .275 | 15 | 43 |
| Pepe Frías | 100 | 225 | 52 | .231 | 0 | 22 |
| Boots Day | 101 | 207 | 57 | .275 | 4 | 28 |
| Larry Lintz | 52 | 116 | 29 | .250 | 0 | 3 |
| Jim Lyttle | 49 | 116 | 30 | .259 | 4 | 19 |
| Bob Stinson | 48 | 111 | 29 | .261 | 3 | 12 |
| Clyde Mashore | 67 | 103 | 21 | .204 | 3 | 14 |
| Terry Humphrey | 43 | 90 | 15 | .167 | 1 | 9 |
| Pepe Mangual | 33 | 62 | 11 | .177 | 3 | 7 |
| Jorge Roque | 25 | 61 | 9 | .148 | 1 | 6 |
| Bernie Allen | 16 | 50 | 9 | .180 | 2 | 9 |
| Felipe Alou | 19 | 48 | 10 | .208 | 1 | 4 |
| Coco Laboy | 22 | 33 | 4 | .121 | 1 | 2 |
| Jim Cox | 9 | 15 | 2 | .133 | 0 | 0 |
| Barry Foote | 6 | 6 | 4 | .667 | 0 | 1 |
| José Morales | 5 | 5 | 2 | .400 | 0 | 0 |
| Curtis Brown | 1 | 4 | 0 | .000 | 0 | 0 |
| Tony Scott | 11 | 1 | 0 | .000 | 0 | 0 |

=== Pitching ===
| = Indicates franchise record |

==== Starting pitchers ====
Note: G = Games pitched; IP = Innings pitched; W = Wins; L = Losses; ERA = Earned run average; SO = Strikeouts

| Player | G | IP | W | L | ERA | SO |
|---|---|---|---|---|---|---|
| Steve Renko | 36 | 249.2 | 15 | 11 | 2.81 | 164 |
| Mike Torrez | 35 | 208.0 | 9 | 12 | 4.46 | 90 |
| Balor Moore | 35 | 176.1 | 7 | 16 | 4.49 | 151 |
| Ernie McAnally | 27 | 147.0 | 7 | 9 | 4.04 | 72 |
| Steve Rogers | 17 | 134.0 | 10 | 5 | 1.54 | 64 |

==== Other pitchers ====
Note: G = Games pitched; IP = Innings pitched; W = Wins; L = Losses; ERA = Earned run average; SO = Strikeouts

| Player | G | IP | W | L | ERA | SO |
|---|---|---|---|---|---|---|
| Bill Stoneman | 29 | 96.2 | 4 | 8 | 6.80 | 48 |
| John Strohmayer | 17 | 34.2 | 0 | 1 | 5.19 | 15 |

==== Relief pitchers ====
Note: G = Games pitched; W = Wins; L = Losses; SV = Saves; ERA = Earned run average; SO = Strikeouts

| Player | G | W | L | SV | ERA | SO |
|---|---|---|---|---|---|---|
| Mike Marshall | 92 | 14 | 11 | 31 | 2.66 | 124 |
| Tom Walker | 54 | 7 | 5 | 4 | 3.63 | 68 |
| Pat Jarvis | 28 | 2 | 1 | 0 | 3.20 | 19 |
| Mickey Scott | 22 | 1 | 2 | 0 | 5.25 | 11 |
| Joe Gilbert | 21 | 1 | 2 | 1 | 4.97 | 17 |
| Craig Caskey | 9 | 0 | 0 | 0 | 5.65 | 6 |
| Chuck Taylor | 8 | 2 | 0 | 0 | 1.77 | 10 |
| John Montague | 4 | 0 | 0 | 0 | 3.52 | 7 |

== Award winners ==
- Mike Jorgensen, Gold Glove, first base
- Gene Mauch, Associated Press NL Manager of the Year

=== All-Stars ===
1973 Major League Baseball All-Star Game

== Farm system ==
| Level | Team | League | Manager |
|---|---|---|---|
| AAA | Peninsula Whips | International League | Bill Adair |
| AA | Québec Carnavals | Eastern League | Karl Kuehl |
| A | West Palm Beach Expos | Florida State League | Lance Nichols |
| A-Short Season | Jamestown Falcons | New York–Penn League | Walt Hriniak |
