= 1973 Atlanta Braves season =

1973 Atlanta Braves
- League: National League
- Division: West
- Ballpark: Atlanta Stadium
- City: Atlanta
- Record: 76–85 (.472)
- Divisional place: 5th
- Owners: William Bartholomay
- General managers: Eddie Robinson
- Managers: Eddie Mathews
- Television: WTCG
- Radio: WSB (Ernie Johnson, Milo Hamilton)

The 1973 Atlanta Braves season was the eighth season in Atlanta along with the 103rd season as a franchise overall. The highlight of the season was Hank Aaron finishing the season just one home run short of Babe Ruth as baseball's all-time home run king. The 1973 Atlanta Braves were the first team to boast three 40 home run hitters. They were Aaron, Darrell Evans, and Davey Johnson. Also of note, it marked the only time in Johnson's career that he hit 40 home runs in one season.

== Offseason ==
- October 27, 1972: Rico Carty was traded by the Braves to the Texas Rangers for Jim Panther.
- January 10, 1973: Brian Asselstine was drafted by the Braves in the 1st round (15th pick) of the 1973 Major League Baseball draft (secondary phase).
- January 21, 1973: Curt Blefary was signed as a free agent by the Braves.
- February 28, 1973: Pat Jarvis was traded by the Braves to the Montreal Expos for Carl Morton.
- March 26, 1973: Denny McLain was released by the Braves.

== Regular season ==
=== Season standings ===
NL West
Team	W	L	Pct.	GB	Home	Road
Cincinnati Reds	99	63	.611	—	50‍–‍31	49‍–‍32
Los Angeles Dodgers	95	66	.590	3½	50‍–‍31	45‍–‍35
San Francisco Giants	88	74	.543	11	47‍–‍34	41‍–‍40
Houston Astros	82	80	.506	17	41‍–‍40	41‍–‍40
Atlanta Braves	76	85	.472	22½	40‍–‍40	36‍–‍45
San Diego Padres	60	102	.370	39	31‍–‍50	29‍–‍52

=== Record vs. opponents ===
1973 National League record Sources:
Team	ATL	CHC	CIN	HOU	LAD	MON	NYM	PHI	PIT	SD	SF	STL
Atlanta	—	7–5	5–13	11–7	2–15–1	6–6	6–6	6–6	7–5	12–6	8–10	6–6
Chicago	5–7	—	8–4	6–6	5–7	9–9	10–7	10–8	6–12	7–5	2–10	9–9
Cincinnati	13–5	4–8	—	11–7	11–7	8–4	8–4	8–4	7–5	13–5	10–8	6–6
Houston	7–11	6–6	7–11	—	11–7	6–6	6–6	7–5	6–6	10–8	11–7	5–7
Los Angeles	15–2–1	7–5	7–11	7–11	—	7–5	7–5	9–3	10–2	9–9	9–9	8–4
Montreal	6–6	9–9	4–8	6–6	5–7	—	9–9	13–5	6–12	7–5	6–6	8–10
New York	6–6	7–10	4–8	6–6	5–7	9–9	—	9–9	13–5	8–4	5–7	10–8
Philadelphia	6-6	8–10	4–8	5–7	3–9	5–13	9–9	—	8–10	9–3	5–7	9–9
Pittsburgh	5–7	12–6	5–7	6–6	2–10	12–6	5–13	10–8	—	8–4	5–7	10–8
San Diego	6–12	5–7	5–13	8–10	9–9	5–7	4–8	3–9	4–8	—	7–11	4–8
San Francisco	10–8	10–2	8–10	7–11	9–9	6–6	7–5	7–5	7–5	11–7	—	6–6
St. Louis	6–6	9–9	6–6	7–5	4–8	10–8	8–10	9–9	8–10	8–4	6–6	—

=== Opening Day starters ===
- Hank Aaron
- Dusty Baker
- Darrell Evans
- Ralph Garr
- Gary Gentry
- Rod Gilbreath
- Davey Johnson
- Johnny Oates
- Marty Perez

=== Notable transactions ===
- May 19, 1973: Andre Thornton was traded by the Braves to the Chicago Cubs for Joe Pepitone.
- June 7, 1973: Pat Dobson was traded by the Braves to the New York Yankees for Frank Tepedino, Wayne Nordhagen, and players to be named later. The Yankees completed the deal by sending Dave Cheadle to the Braves on August 15 and Al Closter to the Braves on September 5.
- June 19, 1973: Joe Pepitone was released by the Braves.

=== Hank Aaron's Chase for the Record ===
At the age of 39, Aaron managed to slug 40 home runs in 392 at bats, ending the season with 713, which at that time one home run short of the record. He hit home run number 713 on September 29, 1973, and with one day remaining in the season, many expected him to tie the record. But in his final game that year, playing against the Houston Astros (led by manager Leo Durocher, who had once roomed with Babe Ruth), he was unable to hit one out of the park. After the game, Aaron stated that his only fear was that he might not live to see the 1974 season. That statement was not just about the death threats: one year earlier, September 30, 1972, was the last day that the legendary Roberto Clemente ever played, as he perished in the offseason.

Home Run	Date	Pitcher	Inning	Location
700	July 21, 1973	Ken Brett	Bottom 3rd	Fulton County Stadium
701	July 31, 1973	Pedro Borbón	Bottom 9th	Fulton County Stadium
702	August 16, 1973	Jack Aker	Top 8th	Wrigley Field
703	August 17, 1973	Steve Renko	Top 6th	Parc Jarry
704	August 18, 1973	Steve Rogers	Top 8th	Parc Jarry
705	August 22, 1973	Reggie Cleveland	Bottom 6th	Fulton County Stadium
706	August 28, 1973	Milt Pappas	Bottom 1st	Fulton County Stadium
707	September 3, 1973	Clay Kirby	Top 3rd	San Diego Stadium
708	September 3, 1973	Vicente Romo	Top 5th	San Diego Stadium
709	September 8, 1973	Jack Billingham	Bottom 7th	Fulton County Stadium
710	September 10, 1973	Don Carrithers	Bottom 3rd	Fulton County Stadium
711	September 17, 1973	Gary Ross	Bottom 8th	Fulton County Stadium
712	September 22, 1973	Dave Roberts	Top 6th	Astrodome
713	September 29, 1973	Jerry Reuss	Bottom 5th	Fulton County Stadium

=== Roster ===
1973 Atlanta Braves
Roster
Pitchers: 30 Dave Cheadle; 43 Al Closter; 27 Adrian Devine; 27 Pat Dobson; 56 Wenty Ford; 40 Jimmy Freeman; 25,34 Danny Frisella; 39 Gary Gentry; 24 Roric Harrison; 43 Joe Hoerner; 39 Tom House; 36 Tom Kelley; 32 Max León; 49 Carl Morton; 31 Gary Neibauer; 36 Joe Niekro; 35 Phil Niekro; 22 Jim Panther; 38 Ron Reed; 37 Ron Schueler; 34 Cecil Upshaw	Catchers: 5 Paul Casanova; 25 Larry Howard; 15 Johnny Oates; 18 Freddie Velázquez; Infielders: 4 Larvell Blanks; 14 Dick Dietz; 11 Darrell Evans; 17 Leo Foster; 19 Rod Gilbreath; 29 Chuck Goggin; 6 Davey Johnson; 28 Mike Lum; 7 Joe Pepitone; 9 Marty Perez; 18 Jack Pierce; 7 Frank Tepedino	Outfielders: 44 Hank Aaron; 12 Dusty Baker; 20,45 Oscar Brown; 48 Ralph Garr; 16 Sonny Jackson; 42 Norm Miller	Manager: 41 Eddie Mathews; Coaches: 33 Lew Burdette; 8 Jim Busby; 7 Roy Hartsfield; 1 Connie Ryan; 3 Ken Silvestri

== Player stats ==
=== Batting ===
==== Starters by position ====
Note: Pos = Position; G = Games played; AB = At bats; H = Hits; Avg. = Batting average; HR = Home runs; RBI = Runs batted in

Pos	Player	G	AB	H	Avg.	HR	RBI
C	Johnny Oates	93	322	80	.248	4	27
1B	Mike Lum	138	513	151	.294	16	82
2B	Davey Johnson	157	559	151	.270	43	99
3B	Darrell Evans	161	595	167	.281	41	104
SS	Marty Perez	141	501	125	.250	8	57
LF	Hank Aaron	120	392	118	.301	40	96
CF	Dusty Baker	159	604	174	.288	21	99
RF	Ralph Garr	148	668	200	.299	11	55

==== Other batters ====
Note: G = Games played; AB = At bats; H = Hits; Avg. = Batting average; HR = Home runs; RBI = Runs batted in

Player	G	AB	H	Avg.	HR	RBI
Paul Casanova	82	236	51	.216	7	18
Sonny Jackson	117	206	43	.209	0	12
Frank Tepedino	74	148	45	.304	4	29
Dick Dietz	83	139	41	.295	3	24
Chuck Goggin	64	90	26	.289	0	7
Rod Gilbreath	29	74	21	.284	0	2
Oscar Brown	22	58	12	.207	0	0
Freddie Velázquez	15	23	8	.348	0	3
Jack Pierce	11	20	1	.050	0	0
Larvell Blanks	17	18	4	.222	0	0
Joe Pepitone	3	11	4	.364	0	1
Norm Miller	9	8	3	.375	1	6
Larry Howard	4	8	1	.125	0	0
Leo Foster	3	6	1	.167	0	0

=== Pitching ===
==== Starting pitchers ====
Note: G = Games pitched; IP = Innings pitched; W = Wins; L = Losses; ERA = Earned run average; SO = Strikeouts

Player	G	IP	W	L	ERA	SO
Carl Morton	38	256.1	15	10	3.41	112
Phil Niekro	42	245.0	13	10	3.31	131
Ron Reed	20	116.1	4	11	4.41	64
Gary Gentry	16	86.2	4	6	3.43	42
Pat Dobson	12	57.2	3	7	4.99	23

==== Other pitchers ====
Note: G = Games pitched; IP = Innings pitched; W = Wins; L = Losses; ERA = Earned run average; SO = Strikeouts

Player	G	IP	W	L	ERA	SO
Ron Schueler	39	186.0	8	7	3.87	124
Roric Harrison	38	177.1	11	8	4.16	130
Jimmy Freeman	13	37.1	0	2	7.71	20
Wenty Ford	4	16.1	1	2	5.51	4

==== Relief pitchers ====
Note: G = Games pitched; W = Wins; L = Losses; SV = Saves; ERA = Earned run average; SO = Strikeouts

Player	G	W	L	SV	ERA	SO
Danny Frisella	42	1	2	8	4.20	27
Tom House	52	4	2	4	4.68	42
Adrian Devine	24	2	3	4	6.40	15
Jim Panther	23	2	3	0	7.63	8
Joe Niekro	20	2	4	3	4.13	12
Joe Hoerner	20	2	2	2	6.39	10
Gary Neibauer	16	2	1	0	7.17	9
Max León	12	2	2	0	5.33	18
Tom Kelley	7	0	1	0	2.84	5
Cecil Upshaw	5	0	1	0	9.82	3
Al Closter	4	0	0	0	14.54	2
Dave Cheadle	2	0	1	0	18.00	2

== Awards and honors ==
=== League records ===
- Davey Johnson, Tied Rogers Hornsby's record for most home runs in one season by a National League second baseman (42)

=== All-Stars ===
1973 Major League Baseball All-Star Game

- Hank Aaron, first baseman, starter
- Darrell Evans, reserve
- Davey Johnson, reserve

== Farm system ==
Level	Team	League	Manager
AAA	Richmond Braves	International League	Bobby Hofman and Clint Courtney
AA	Savannah Braves	Southern League	Clint Courtney and Tommie Aaron
A	Kinston Eagles	Carolina League	Gene Hassell
A	Greenwood Braves	Western Carolinas League	Hoyt Wilhelm
Rookie	Wytheville Braves	Appalachian League	Paul Snyder

Kinston affiliation shared with New York Yankees
