= 1973 Pittsburgh Pirates season =

1973 Pittsburgh Pirates
- League: National League
- Division: East
- Ballpark: Three Rivers Stadium
- City: Pittsburgh, Pennsylvania
- Record: 80–82 (.494)
- Divisional place: 3rd
- Owners: John W. Galbreath (majority shareholder); Bing Crosby, Thomas P. Johnson (minority shareholders)
- General managers: Joe L. Brown
- Managers: Bill Virdon; Danny Murtaugh
- Television: KDKA-TV; Bob Prince, Nellie King
- Radio: KDKA; Bob Prince, Nellie King

The 1973 Pittsburgh Pirates season was the 92nd season of the Pittsburgh Pirates franchise; the 87th in the National League. The Pirates finished third in the National League East with a record of 80–82.

== Offseason ==
- October 25, 1972: Gene Garber was traded by the Pirates to the Kansas City Royals for Jim Rooker.
- November 25, 1972: Dick Sharon was traded by the Pirates to the Detroit Tigers for Jim Foor and Norm McRae.
- December 31, 1972: Roberto Clemente was killed in an airplane crash.
- April 2, 1973: Charlie Sands was traded by the Pirates to the Detroit Tigers for Chris Zachary.

== Regular season ==
=== Season standings ===
NL East
Team	W	L	Pct.	GB	Home	Road
New York Mets	82	79	.509	—	43‍–‍38	39‍–‍41
St. Louis Cardinals	81	81	.500	1½	43‍–‍38	38‍–‍43
Pittsburgh Pirates	80	82	.494	2½	41‍–‍40	39‍–‍42
Montreal Expos	79	83	.488	3½	43‍–‍38	36‍–‍45
Chicago Cubs	77	84	.478	5	41‍–‍39	36‍–‍45
Philadelphia Phillies	71	91	.438	11½	38‍–‍43	33‍–‍48

=== Record vs. opponents ===
1973 National League record Sources:
Team	ATL	CHC	CIN	HOU	LAD	MON	NYM	PHI	PIT	SD	SF	STL
Atlanta	—	7–5	5–13	11–7	2–15–1	6–6	6–6	6–6	7–5	12–6	8–10	6–6
Chicago	5–7	—	8–4	6–6	5–7	9–9	10–7	10–8	6–12	7–5	2–10	9–9
Cincinnati	13–5	4–8	—	11–7	11–7	8–4	8–4	8–4	7–5	13–5	10–8	6–6
Houston	7–11	6–6	7–11	—	11–7	6–6	6–6	7–5	6–6	10–8	11–7	5–7
Los Angeles	15–2–1	7–5	7–11	7–11	—	7–5	7–5	9–3	10–2	9–9	9–9	8–4
Montreal	6–6	9–9	4–8	6–6	5–7	—	9–9	13–5	6–12	7–5	6–6	8–10
New York	6–6	7–10	4–8	6–6	5–7	9–9	—	9–9	13–5	8–4	5–7	10–8
Philadelphia	6-6	8–10	4–8	5–7	3–9	5–13	9–9	—	8–10	9–3	5–7	9–9
Pittsburgh	5–7	12–6	5–7	6–6	2–10	12–6	5–13	10–8	—	8–4	5–7	10–8
San Diego	6–12	5–7	5–13	8–10	9–9	5–7	4–8	3–9	4–8	—	7–11	4–8
San Francisco	10–8	10–2	8–10	7–11	9–9	6–6	7–5	7–5	7–5	11–7	—	6–6
St. Louis	6–6	9–9	6–6	7–5	4–8	10–8	8–10	9–9	8–10	8–4	6–6	—

=== Game log ===
1973 Game Log: 80–82 (Home: 41–40; Away: 39–42)
April: 8–7 (Home: 4–4; Away: 4–3)

#	Date	Opponent	Score	Win	Loss	Save	Attendance	Record
1	April 6	Cardinals	7–5	**Rooker** (1–0)	Segui	**Hernandez** (1)	51,695	1–0
2	April 8	Cardinals	4–3 (10)	**Giusti** (1–0)	Granger	—		2–0
3	April 8	Cardinals	5–3	**Ellis** (1–0)	Spinks	**Hernandez** (2)	23,391	3–0
4	April 12	Cubs	6–0	**Moose** (1–0)	Jenkins	—	3,764	4–0
5	April 14	@ Expos	4–6	Walker	**Briles** (0–1)	—	21,198	4–1
6	April 15	@ Expos	8–3	**Ellis** (2–0)	Torrez	**Giusti** (1)	12,101	5–1
7	April 17	@ Cardinals	4–3 (14)	**Hernandez** (1–0)	Foster	**Rooker** (1)	9,851	6–1
8	April 18	@ Cardinals	8–2	**Moose** (2–0)	Wise	**Walker** (1)	6,228	7–1
9	April 21	@ Cubs	9–10	Locker	**Briles** (0–2)	—	16,637	7–2
10	April 22	@ Cubs	10–4	**Ellis** (3–0)	Pappas	**Rooker** (2)		8–2
11	April 22	@ Cubs	3–11	Gura	**Blass** (0–1)	Bonham	28,271	8–3
12	April 24	Padres	5–7	Troedson	**Moose** (2–1)	Romo	10,108	8–4
13	April 28	Dodgers	2–3	Sutton	**Briles** (0–3)	—	9,643	8–5
14	April 29	Dodgers	8–9 (13)	Downing	**Hernandez** (1–1)	—		8–6
15	April 29	Dodgers	1–2	Osteen	**Ellis** (3–1)	—	18,083	8–7

May: 13–14 (Home: 7–7; Away: 6–7)

#	Date	Opponent	Score	Win	Loss	Save	Attendance	Record
16	May 1	@ Giants	7–8	Sosa	**Hernandez** (1–2)	—	7,972	8–8
17	May 2	@ Giants	2–1	**Walker** (1–0)	Barr	**Giusti** (2)	4,818	9–8
18	May 3	@ Giants	14–5	**Briles** (1–3)	Willoughby	—	4,198	10–8
19	May 4	@ Padres	12–6	**Blass** (1–1)	Norman	—	9,595	11–8
20	May 5	@ Padres	5–6	Romo	**Ellis** (3–2)	—	10,619	11–9
21	May 6	@ Padres	0–8	Caldwell	**Moose** (2–2)	—	7,176	11–10
22	May 7	@ Dodgers	5–4	**Johnson** (1–0)	Sutton	**Rooker** (3)	17,745	12–10
23	May 8	@ Dodgers	4–7	Messersmith	**Briles** (1–4)	Brewer	13,620	12–11
24	May 9	@ Dodgers	5–8	Osteen	**Blass** (1–2)	Culver	17,509	12–12
25	May 11	Mets	3–4	Parker	**Ellis** (3–3)	McGraw	17,564	12–13
26	May 12	Mets	0–6	Seaver	**Moose** (2–3)	—	13,058	12–14
27	May 13	Mets	4–6	McAndrew	**Walker** (1–1)	McGraw	14,310	12–15
28	May 14	Expos	2–3 (10)	Walker	**Briles** (1–5)	—	6,327	12–16
29	May 15	Expos	9–8 (11)	**Giusti** (2–0)	Gilbert	—	5,441	13–16
30	May 16	Phillies	2–5	Twitchell	**Ellis** (3–4)	Scarce	6,885	13–17
31	May 17	Phillies	5–2	**Moose** (3–3)	Carlton	**Rooker** (4)	6,885	14–17
32	May 18	@ Mets	3–4	Seaver	**Walker** (1–2)	—	34,565	14–18
33	May 19	@ Mets	4–1 (10)	**Giusti** (3–0)	McGraw	—	32,622	15–18
34	May 21	@ Phillies	5–4	**Blass** (2–2)	Scarce	**Giusti** (3)	9,010	16–18
35	May 22	@ Phillies	4–7	Twitchell	**Ellis** (3–5)	—	11,617	16–19
36	May 25	Astros	2–7	Reuss	**Moose** (3–4)	—	13,956	16–20
37	May 26	Astros	7–2	**Briles** (2–5)	Forsch	**Giusti** (4)	15,768	17–20
38	May 27	Astros	2–6	Roberts	**Blass** (2–3)	—	15,386	17–21
39	May 28	Astros	4–2	**Ellis** (4–5)	Wilson	**Giusti** (5)	21,546	18–21
40	May 29	Braves	6–1	**Walker** (2–2)	Morton	**Rooker** (5)	7,911	19–21
41	May 30	Braves	4–2	**Moose** (4–4)	Reed	—	7,963	20–21
42	May 31	Braves	3–1	**Briles** (3–5)	Gentry	—	10,446	21–21

June: 13–18 (Home: 9–9; Away: 4–9)

#	Date	Opponent	Score	Win	Loss	Save	Attendance	Record
43	June 1	Reds	9–6	**Blass** (3–3)	Sprague	**Giusti** (6)	24,213	22–21
44	June 2	Reds	4–3	**Ellis** (5–5)	Billingham	**Giusti** (7)	19,212	23–21
45	June 3	Reds	1–5	Carroll	**Walker** (2–3)	Borbon	22,450	23–22
46	June 4	Giants	2–7	Bradley	**Moose** (4–5)	—	12,570	23–23
47	June 5	Giants	2–3	Bryant	**Briles** (3–6)	Moffitt	14,975	23–24
48	June 6	Giants	7–9	Williams	**Rooker** (1–1)	Moffitt	13,884	23–25
49	June 8	@ Astros	3–4	Forsch	**Ellis** (5–6)	Ray	25,486	23–26
50	June 9	@ Astros	4–1	**Moose** (5–5)	Wilson	—	29,716	24–26
51	June 10	@ Astros	1–7	Reuss	**Briles** (3–7)	—	23,057	24–27
52	June 11	@ Braves	7–9	Morton	**Blass** (3–4)	Schueler	6,878	24–28
53	June 12	@ Braves	2–4	Niekro	**Walker** (2–4)	—	10,418	24–29
54	June 13	@ Braves	3–18	Reed	**Ellis** (5–7)	—	9,553	24–30
55	June 15	@ Reds	0–6	Norman	**Moose** (5–6)	—	27,029	24–31
56	June 16	@ Reds	5–0	**Briles** (4–7)	Gullett	—	39,106	25–31
57	June 17	@ Reds	1–3	Billingham	**Walker** (2–5)	Hall		25–32
58	June 17	@ Reds	1–5	Grimsley	**Dettore** (0–1)	—	50,232	25–33
59	June 18	Cubs	3–1	**Ellis** (6–7)	Jenkins	—	11,470	26–33
60	June 19	Cubs	3–6	Gura	**Johnson** (1–1)	Aker		26–34
61	June 19	Cubs	4–3	**Giusti** (4–0)	Locker	—	28,256	27–34
62	June 20	Cubs	3–5	Reuschel	**Briles** (4–8)	Aker	17,895	27–35
63	June 21	Mets	2–1	**Walker** (3–5)	Capra	—	10,099	28–35
64	June 22	Mets	4–5	Stone	**Blass** (3–5)	—	21,129	28–36
65	June 23	Mets	3–2 (10)	**Hernandez** (2–2)	Hennigan	—	24,337	29–36
66	June 24	Mets	2–5	Seaver	**Moose** (5–7)	—	20,984	29–37
67	June 25	@ Expos	8–6	**Giusti** (5–0)	McAnally	—		30–37
68	June 25	@ Expos	3–1	**Briles** (5–8)	Strohmayer	—	24,402	31–37
69	June 26	@ Expos	3–10	Stoneman	**Walker** (3–6)	Marshall	12,806	31–38
70	June 27	Cardinals	4–15	Cleveland	**Rooker** (1–2)	—	33,041	31–39
71	June 28	Cardinals	6–0	**Ellis** (7–7)	Wise	—	34,471	32–39
72	June 29	Expos	4–0	**Moose** (6–7)	McAnally	—	26,638	33–39
73	June 30	Expos	5–1	**Briles** (6–8)	Moore	**Hernandez** (3)	11,676	34–39

July: 17–12 (Home: 9–4; Away: 8–8)

#	Date	Opponent	Score	Win	Loss	Save	Attendance	Record
74	July 1	Expos	6–2	**Walker** (4–6)	Stoneman	**Johnson** (1)		35–39
75	July 1	Expos	8–4	**Rooker** (2–2)	Torrez	**Giusti** (8)	24,984	36–39
76	July 3	@ Cardinals	0–4	Wise	**Ellis** (7–8)	—		36–40
77	July 3	@ Cardinals	6–7	Folkers	**Blass** (3–6)	Segui	28,449	36–41
78	July 4	@ Cardinals	3–11	Murphy	**Moose** (6–8)	—	12,671	36–42
79	July 5	@ Cardinals	3–2	**Briles** (7–8)	Pena	—	14,652	37–42
80	July 6	@ Dodgers	2–3	Sutton	**Walker** (4–7)	—	28,011	37–43
81	July 7	@ Dodgers	6–8	Rau	**Lamb** (0–1)	Brewer	33,197	37–44
82	July 8	@ Dodgers	2–3 (12)	Richert	**Giusti** (5–1)	—	24,144	37–45
83	July 10	@ Padres	4–3	**Johnson** (2–1)	Troedson	**Lamb** (1)	12,233	38–45
84	July 11	@ Padres	10–2	**Briles** (8–8)	Arlin	—	4,763	39–45
85	July 12	@ Padres	4–0	**Walker** (5–7)	Kirby	—	2,865	40–45
86	July 13	@ Giants	2–5	Bradley	**Ellis** (7–9)	—	10,842	40–46
87	July 14	@ Giants	7–2	**Rooker** (3–2)	Bryant	—	9,458	41–46
88	July 15	@ Giants	0–12	Marichal	**Moose** (6–9)	—	12,851	41–47
89	July 16	Dodgers	0–1	Sutton	**Briles** (8–9)	—	16,570	41–48
90	July 17	Dodgers	4–8	Messersmith	**Walker** (5–8)	Brewer	17,389	41–49
91	July 18	Dodgers	3–2	**Ellis** (8–9)	John	**Giusti** (9)	24,248	42–49
92	July 20	Padres	5–4 (10)	**Giusti** (6–1)	Caldwell	—		43–49
93	July 20	Padres	7–0	**Rooker** (4–2)	Troedson	—	25,832	44–49
94	July 22	Padres	3–1	**Briles** (9–9)	Arlin	**Giusti** (10)		45–49
95	July 22	Padres	13–7	**Walker** (6–8)	Kirby	**Lamb** (2)	22,425	46–49
96	July 26	@ Cubs	3–2	**Ellis** (9–9)	Reuschel	**Giusti** (11)	35,770	47–49
97	July 27	@ Cubs	10–6	**Briles** (10–9)	Gura	**Giusti** (12)	22,045	48–49
98	July 28	Phillies	0–5	Twitchell	**Rooker** (4–3)	—	14,630	48–50
99	July 29	Phillies	5–2	**Hernandez** (3–2)	Ruthven	—		49–50
100	July 29	Phillies	5–2	**Walker** (7–8)	Lersch	**Giusti** (13)	26,947	50–50
101	July 30	Phillies	0–1	Carlton	**Moose** (6–10)	—	17,220	50–51
102	July 31	@ Mets	4–1	**Ellis** (10–9)	Koosman	**Hernandez** (4)	24,322	51–51

August: 14–14 (Home: 7–6; Away: 7–8)

#	Date	Opponent	Score	Win	Loss	Save	Attendance	Record
103	August 1	@ Mets	0–3	Seaver	**Blass** (3–7)	—		51–52
104	August 1	@ Mets	2–5	Stone	**Briles** (10–10)	Parker	27,189	51–53
105	August 2	@ Mets	1–5	Sadecki	**Rooker** (4–4)	McGraw	13,429	51–54
106	August 3	@ Phillies	3–1	**Morlan** (1–0)	Carlton	**Hernandez** (5)	24,152	52–54
107	August 4	@ Phillies	5–11	Brett	**Walker** (7–9)	—		52–55
108	August 4	@ Phillies	11–4	**Hernandez** (4–2)	Lonborg	—	48,294	53–55
109	August 5	@ Phillies	4–1	**Ellis** (11–9)	Twitchell	**Giusti** (14)	31,157	54–55
110	August 7	Astros	0–2	Wilson	**Briles** (10–11)	—	13,841	54–56
111	August 8	Astros	4–3	**Rooker** (5–4)	Roberts	**Johnson** (2)	15,745	55–56
112	August 10	Braves	4–5	Niekro	**Ellis** (11–10)	—	25,781	55–57
113	August 11	Braves	3–9	Harrison	**Morlan** (1–1)	House	21,365	55–58
114	August 12	Braves	5–2	**Moose** (7–10)	Schueler	—	28,718	56–58
115	August 13	Reds	3–2	**Briles** (11–11)	Norman	**Giusti** (15)	15,396	57–58
116	August 14	Reds	4–5	Carroll	**Hernandez** (4–3)	Hall	17,841	57–59
117	August 15	Reds	0–1	Billingham	**Ellis** (11–11)	—	20,903	57–60
118	August 17	Giants	3–5	Bryant	**Moose** (7–11)	Sosa	15,789	57–61
119	August 18	Giants	6–5	**Briles** (12–11)	Barr	**Giusti** (16)	19,569	58–61
120	August 19	Giants	5–0	**Rooker** (6–4)	Marichal	—	23,640	59–61
121	August 20	@ Astros	2–10	Richard	**Ellis** (11–12)	—	11,057	59–62
122	August 21	@ Astros	6–3	**Morlan** (2–1)	Wilson	—	11,094	60–62
123	August 22	@ Astros	4–0	**Moose** (8–11)	Griffin	—	10,746	61–62
124	August 24	@ Braves	2–3	Devine	**Giusti** (6–2)	—	15,680	61–63
125	August 25	@ Braves	6–5 (11)	**Giusti** (7–2)	Neibauer	—	20,103	62–63
126	August 26	@ Braves	6–8	Harrison	**Ellis** (11–13)	Devine	26,113	62–64
127	August 28	@ Reds	8–3	**Moose** (9–11)	Grimsley	**Johnson** (3)	31,729	63–64
128	August 29	@ Reds	3–5	Billingham	**Briles** (12–12)	—	30,032	63–65
129	August 31	Cubs	7–0	**Rooker** (7–4)	Reuschel	—		64–65
130	August 31	Cubs	5–2	**Johnson** (3–1)	Jenkins	**Hernandez** (6)	35,884	65–65

September: 15–16 (Home: 5–9; Away: 10–7)

#	Date	Opponent	Score	Win	Loss	Save	Attendance	Record
131	September 1	Cubs	1–0	**Giusti** (8–2)	Hooton	—	13,484	66–65
132	September 2	Cubs	3–5	Locker	**Hernandez** (4–4)	—	19,130	66–66
133	September 3	Cardinals	5–4 (13)	**Giusti** (9–2)	Fisher	—		67–66
134	September 3	Cardinals	3–8	Folkers	**Walker** (7–10)	Pena	43,839	67–67
135	September 4	Cardinals	2–4	Andrews	**Rooker** (7–5)	Hrabosky	16,280	67–68
136	September 5	Cardinals	3–5	Foster	**Morlan** (2–2)	Segui	18,894	67–69
137	September 7	@ Phillies	10–8	**Johnson** (4–1)	Scarce	**Hernandez** (7)	15,233	68–69
138	September 8	@ Phillies	5–3	**Moose** (10–11)	Carlton	**Giusti** (17)	16,320	69–69
139	September 9	@ Phillies	7–8	Scarce	**Johnson** (4–2)	—	14,356	69–70
140	September 10	@ Cubs	11–3	**Rooker** (8–5)	Reuschel	—	7,255	70–70
141	September 11	@ Cubs	0–2	Hooton	**Blass** (3–8)	—	8,516	70–71
142	September 12	@ Cubs	4–2	**Kison** (1–0)	Paul	**Giusti** (18)	9,857	71–71
143	September 13	@ Cubs	6–1	**Moose** (11–11)	Pappas	**Hernandez** (8)	7,375	72–71
144	September 14	@ Cardinals	3–1	**Briles** (13–12)	Cleveland	**Hernandez** (9)	32,630	73–71
145	September 15	@ Cardinals	7–4	**Rooker** (9–5)	Nagy	**Hernandez** (10)	28,219	74–71
146	September 16	@ Cardinals	3–7	Foster	**Walker** (7–11)	Hrabosky	31,938	74–72
147	September 17	Mets	10–3	**Kison** (2–0)	Seaver	**Zachary** (1)	15,000	75–72
148	September 18	Mets	5–6	McGraw	**Hernandez** (4–5)	Capra	12,336	75–73
149	September 19	@ Mets	3–7	Stone	**Briles** (13–13)	McGraw	29,240	75–74
150	September 20	@ Mets	3–4 (13)	Sadecki	**Walker** (7–12)	—	24,855	75–75
151	September 21	@ Mets	2–10	Seaver	**Blass** (3–9)	—	51,381	75–76
152	September 23	@ Expos	6–3	**Kison** (3–0)	Stoneman	**Hernandez** (11)		76–76
153	September 23	@ Expos	7–4	**Ellis** (12–13)	Torrez	**Giusti** (19)	26,178	77–76
154	September 24	@ Expos	4–5	Renko	**Moose** (11–12)	Marshall		77–77
155	September 24	@ Expos	3–0	**Briles** (14–13)	McAnally	**Giusti** (20)	20,168	78–77
156	September 25	Phillies	1–2	Carlton	**Rooker** (9–6)	—	13,312	78–78
157	September 26	Phillies	13–2	**Moose** (12–12)	Lonborg	**Johnson** (4)	8,991	79–78
158	September 27	Phillies	2–3 (13)	Culver	**Zachary** (0–1)	Wallace	11,577	79–79
159	September 28	Expos	2–3	Marshall	**Ellis** (12–14)	—	27,804	79–80
160	September 29	Expos	4–6	Rogers	**McKee** (0–1)	Marshall	9,816	79–81
161	September 30	Expos	10–2	**Rooker** (10–6)	McAnally	—	33,376	80–81

October: 0–1 (Home: 0–1; Away: 0–0)

#	Date	Opponent	Score	Win	Loss	Save	Attendance	Record
162	October 1	Padres	3–4	Jones	**Moose** (12–13)	Corkins	2,572	80–82

Legend: = Win = Loss
Bold = Pirates team member

=== Opening Day lineup ===
Opening Day Starters
#	Name	Position
6	Rennie Stennett	2B
35	Manny Sanguillén	RF
16	Al Oliver	CF
8	Willie Stargell	LF
7	Bob Robertson	1B
3	Richie Hebner	3B
14	Gene Alley	SS
29	Milt May	C
28	Steve Blass	SP

=== Notable transactions ===
- May 4, 1973: Jerry McNertney was purchased by the Pirates from the Oakland Athletics.
- May 24, 1973: Chuck Goggin was sold by the Pirates to the Atlanta Braves.
- June 5, 1973: Steve Nicosia was chosen by the Pirates in the 1st round of the 1973 Major League Baseball draft.
- June 17, 1973: Rick Langford was signed as an amateur free agent by the Pirates.
- July 5, 1973: Jerry McNertney was released by the Pirates.
- July 7, 1973: Dal Maxvill was purchased by the Pirates from the Oakland Athletics.
- July 31, 1973: Vic Davalillo was sold by the Pirates to the Oakland Athletics.
- September 7, 1973: Bill Virdon was fired as Manager of the Pirates, replaced by Danny Murtaugh.

=== Roster ===
1973 Pittsburgh Pirates
**Roster**
**Pitchers**: 28 Steve Blass; 34 Nelson Briles; 32 Tom Dettore; 17 Dock Ellis; 58 Jim Foor; 31 Dave Giusti; 36 Ramón Hernández; 27 Bob Johnson; 25 Bruce Kison; 44 John Lamb; 39 Jim McKee; 38 Bob Moose; 12 John Morlan; 19 Jim Rooker; 23 Luke Walker; 32 Chris Zachary	**Catchers**: 12 Chuck Goggin; 29 Milt May; 11 Jerry McNertney; 35 Manny Sanguillén; **Infielders**: 14 Gene Alley; 30 Dave Cash; 18 Vic Davalillo; 37 Fernando González; 3 Richie Hebner; 2 Jackie Hernández; 11 Dal Maxvill; 7 Bob Robertson; 6 Rennie Stennett	**Outfielders**: 45 Dave Augustine; 15 Gene Clines; 16 Al Oliver; 39 Dave Parker; 8 Willie Stargell; 22 Richie Zisk; **Other batters**: 4 Jim Campanis	**Manager**: 40 Danny Murtaugh; 41 Bill Virdon; **Coaches**: 43 Don Leppert (First Base); 9 Bill Mazeroski (Third Base); 5 Dave Ricketts (Bullpen); 42 Mel Wright (Pitching)

== Player stats ==
=== Batting ===
==== Starters by position ====
Note: Pos = Position; G = Games played; AB = At bats; H = Hits; Avg. = Batting average; HR = Home runs; RBI = Runs batted in

Pos	Player	G	AB	H	Avg.	HR	RBI
C	Manny Sanguillén	149	589	166	.282	12	65
1B	Bob Robertson	119	397	95	.239	14	40
2B	Dave Cash	116	436	118	.271	2	31
SS	Dal Maxvill	74	217	41	.189	0	17
3B	Richie Hebner	144	509	138	.271	25	74
LF	Willie Stargell	148	522	156	.299	44	119
CF	Al Oliver	158	654	191	.292	20	99
RF	Richie Zisk	103	333	108	.324	10	54

==== Other batters ====
Note: G = Games played; AB = At bats; H = Hits; Avg. = Batting average; HR = Home runs; RBI = Runs batted in

Player	G	AB	H	Avg.	HR	RBI
Rennie Stennett	128	466	113	.242	10	55
Gene Clines	110	304	80	.263	1	23
Milt May	101	283	76	.269	7	31
Gene Alley	76	158	32	.203	2	8
Dave Parker	54	139	40	.288	4	14
Vic Davalillo	59	83	15	.181	1	3
Jackie Hernández	54	73	18	.247	0	8
Fernando González	37	49	11	.224	1	5
Dave Augustine	11	7	2	.286	0	0
Jim Campanis	6	6	1	.167	0	0
Jerry McNertney	9	4	1	.250	0	0
Chuck Goggin	1	1	1	1.000	0	0

=== Pitching ===
==== Starting pitchers ====
Note: G = Games pitched; IP = Innings pitched; W = Wins; L = Losses; ERA = Earned run average; SO = Strikeouts

Player	G	IP	W	L	ERA	SO
Nelson Briles	33	218.2	14	13	2.84	94
Bob Moose	33	201.1	12	13	3.53	111
Dock Ellis	28	192.0	12	14	3.05	122
Steve Blass	23	88.2	3	9	9.85	27
Bruce Kison	7	43.2	3	0	3.09	26

==== Other pitchers ====
Note: G = Games pitched; IP = Innings pitched; W = Wins; L = Losses; ERA = Earned run average; SO = Strikeouts

Player	G	IP	W	L	ERA	SO
Jim Rooker	41	170.1	10	6	2.85	122
Luke Walker	37	122.0	7	12	4.65	74
John Morlan	10	41.0	2	2	3.95	23

==== Relief pitchers ====
Note: G = Games pitched; W = Wins; L = Losses; SV = Saves; ERA = Earned run average; SO = Strikeouts

Player	G	W	L	SV	ERA	SO
Dave Giusti	67	9	2	20	2.37	64
Ramón Hernández	59	4	5	11	2.41	64
Bob Johnson	50	4	2	4	3.62	68
John Lamb	22	0	1	2	6.07	11
Jim McKee	15	0	1	0	5.67	13
Tom Dettore	12	0	1	0	5.96	13
Chris Zachary	6	0	1	1	3.00	6
Jim Foor	3	0	0	0	0.00	1

== Awards and honors ==
1973 Major League Baseball All-Star Game

== Farm system ==
Level	Team	League	Manager
AAA	Charleston Charlies	International League	Joe Morgan
AA	Sherbrooke Pirates	Eastern League	Tim Murtaugh
A	Salem Pirates	Carolina League	Steve Demeter
A	Charleston Pirates	Western Carolinas League	Chuck Cottier
A-Short Season	Niagara Falls Pirates	New York–Penn League	Woody Huyke
Rookie	GCL Pirates	Gulf Coast League	Ed Napoleon
