= 1973 St. Louis Cardinals season =

Major League Baseball season

1973 St. Louis Cardinals
- League: National League
- Division: East
- Ballpark: Busch Memorial Stadium
- City: St. Louis, Missouri
- Record: 81–81 (.500)
- Divisional place: 2nd
- Owners: August "Gussie" Busch
- General managers: Bing Devine
- Managers: Red Schoendienst
- Television: KSD-TV (Mike Shannon, Jay Randolph)
- Radio: KMOX (Jack Buck, Mike Shannon, Harry Walker)

The 1973 St. Louis Cardinals season was the team's 92nd season in St. Louis, Missouri and its 82nd season in the National League. The Cardinals overcame an 8–23 start to finish with an 81–81 record during the season and finished second in the National League East, 1 1/2 games behind the NL East and eventual NL pennant winners New York Mets. St. Louis' record went to 61–50 (meaning they won 53 of 80 games after their terrible start), then fell to 20–31 to finish the season.

To date, this is the only season the Cardinals have finished at .500 instead of above or below it.

== Offseason ==
- October 27, 1972: Jerry McNertney was released by the Cardinals.

== Regular season ==
Pitcher Bob Gibson won a Gold Glove this year.

=== Season standings ===
NL East
Team	W	L	Pct.	GB	Home	Road
New York Mets	82	79	.509	—	43‍–‍38	39‍–‍41
St. Louis Cardinals	81	81	.500	1½	43‍–‍38	38‍–‍43
Pittsburgh Pirates	80	82	.494	2½	41‍–‍40	39‍–‍42
Montreal Expos	79	83	.488	3½	43‍–‍38	36‍–‍45
Chicago Cubs	77	84	.478	5	41‍–‍39	36‍–‍45
Philadelphia Phillies	71	91	.438	11½	38‍–‍43	33‍–‍48

=== Record vs. opponents ===
1973 National League record Sources:
Team	ATL	CHC	CIN	HOU	LAD	MON	NYM	PHI	PIT	SD	SF	STL
Atlanta	—	7–5	5–13	11–7	2–15–1	6–6	6–6	6–6	7–5	12–6	8–10	6–6
Chicago	5–7	—	8–4	6–6	5–7	9–9	10–7	10–8	6–12	7–5	2–10	9–9
Cincinnati	13–5	4–8	—	11–7	11–7	8–4	8–4	8–4	7–5	13–5	10–8	6–6
Houston	7–11	6–6	7–11	—	11–7	6–6	6–6	7–5	6–6	10–8	11–7	5–7
Los Angeles	15–2–1	7–5	7–11	7–11	—	7–5	7–5	9–3	10–2	9–9	9–9	8–4
Montreal	6–6	9–9	4–8	6–6	5–7	—	9–9	13–5	6–12	7–5	6–6	8–10
New York	6–6	7–10	4–8	6–6	5–7	9–9	—	9–9	13–5	8–4	5–7	10–8
Philadelphia	6-6	8–10	4–8	5–7	3–9	5–13	9–9	—	8–10	9–3	5–7	9–9
Pittsburgh	5–7	12–6	5–7	6–6	2–10	12–6	5–13	10–8	—	8–4	5–7	10–8
San Diego	6–12	5–7	5–13	8–10	9–9	5–7	4–8	3–9	4–8	—	7–11	4–8
San Francisco	10–8	10–2	8–10	7–11	9–9	6–6	7–5	7–5	7–5	11–7	—	6–6
St. Louis	6–6	9–9	6–6	7–5	4–8	10–8	8–10	9–9	8–10	8–4	6–6	—

=== Notable transactions ===
- May 8, 1973: Al Santorini was traded by the Cardinals to the Kansas City Royals for Tom Murphy.
- June 5, 1973: 1973 Major League Baseball draft
  - John Tamargo was drafted by the Cardinals in the 6th round.
  - Eric Rasmussen was drafted by the Cardinals in the 32nd round.
  - Bryn Smith was drafted by the Cardinals in the 49th round, but did not sign. However, he would pitch for the team from 1990 to 1992.
- August 7, 1973: Wayne Granger was traded by the Cardinals to the New York Yankees for a player to be named later and cash. The Yankees completed the deal by sending Ken Crosby to the Cardinals on September 12.
- August 18, 1973: Dave Campbell and cash were traded by the Cardinals to the Houston Astros for Tommie Agee.
- August 29, 1973: Eddie Fisher was purchased by the St. Louis Cardinals from the Chicago White Sox.

=== Roster ===
1973 St. Louis Cardinals
Roster
Pitchers: 37 John Andrews; 48 Jim Bibby; 22 Reggie Cleveland; 48 Eddie Fisher; 28 Rich Folkers; 27 Alan Foster; 45 Bob Gibson; 29 Wayne Granger; 39 Al Hrabosky; 29 Lew Krausse Jr.; 34 Tom Murphy; 49 Mike Nagy; 36 Orlando Peña; 34 Al Santorini; 35 Diego Seguí; 24 Scipio Spinks; 48 Ed Sprague; 46 Mike Thompson; 40 Rick Wise	Catchers: 7 Larry Haney; 16 Marc Hill; 23 Ted Simmons; Infielders: 4 Matty Alou; 19 Dwain Anderson; 5 Ray Busse; 18 Dave Campbell; 4 Ed Crosby; 18 Bobby Fenwick; 5 Tom Heintzelman; 15 Terry Hughes; 25 Mick Kelleher; 15 Tim McCarver; 44 Ken Reitz; 41 Ted Sizemore; 9 Joe Torre; 10 Mike Tyson	Outfielders: 47 Tommie Agee; 20 Lou Brock; 1 Bernie Carbo; 11 Héctor Cruz; 38 José Cruz; 17 Tommy Cruz; 19 Jim Dwyer; 21 Bake McBride; 26 Luis Meléndez; 32 Bill Stein	Manager: 2 Red Schoendienst; Coaches: 8 Vern Benson; 3 George Kissell; 30 Johnny Lewis; 33 Barney Schultz

== Player stats ==
=== Batting ===
==== Starters by position ====
Note: Pos = Position; G = Games played; AB = At bats; H = Hits; Avg. = Batting average; HR = Home runs; RBI = Runs batted in

Pos	Player	G	AB	H	Avg.	HR	RBI
C	Ted Simmons	161	619	192	.310	13	91
1B	Joe Torre	141	519	149	.287	13	69
2B	Ted Sizemore	142	521	147	.282	1	54
SS	Mike Tyson	144	469	114	.243	1	33
3B	Ken Reitz	147	426	100	.235	6	42
LF	Lou Brock	160	650	193	.297	7	63
CF	José Cruz	132	406	92	.227	10	57
RF	Bernie Carbo	111	308	88	.286	8	40

==== Other batters ====
Note: G = Games played; AB = At bats; H = Hits; Avg. = Batting average; HR = Home runs; RBI = Runs batted in

Player	G	AB	H	Avg.	HR	RBI
Luis Meléndez	121	341	91	.267	2	35
Tim McCarver	130	331	88	.266	3	49
Ray Busse	24	70	10	.143	2	5
Bake McBride	40	63	19	.302	0	5
Tommie Agee	26	62	11	.177	3	7
Jim Dwyer	28	57	11	.193	0	0
Bill Stein	32	55	12	.218	0	2
Ed Crosby	22	39	5	.128	0	1
Mick Kelleher	43	38	7	.184	0	2
Tom Heintzelman	23	29	9	.310	0	0
Dave Campbell	13	21	0	.000	0	1
Dwain Anderson	18	17	2	.118	0	0
Terry Hughes	11	14	3	.214	0	1
Hector Cruz	11	11	0	.000	0	0
Matty Alou	11	11	3	.273	0	1
Bobby Fenwick	5	6	1	.167	0	1
Marc Hill	1	3	0	.000	0	0
Larry Haney	2	1	0	.000	0	0
Tommy Cruz	3	0	0	----	0	0

=== Pitching ===
==== Starting pitchers ====
Note: G = Games pitched; IP = Innings pitched; W = Wins; L = Losses; ERA = Earned run average; SO = Strikeouts

Player	G	IP	W	L	ERA	SO
Rick Wise	35	259.0	16	12	3.37	144
Reggie Cleveland	32	224.0	14	10	3.01	122
Alan Foster	35	203.2	13	9	3.14	106
Bob Gibson	25	195.0	12	10	2.77	142
Tom Murphy	19	88.2	3	7	3.76	42
Mike Nagy	9	40.2	0	2	4.20	14
Scipio Spinks	8	38.2	1	5	4.89	25
Mike Thompson	2	4.0	0	0	0.00	3

==== Other pitchers ====
Note: G = Games pitched; IP = Innings pitched; W = Wins; L = Losses; ERA = Earned run average; SO = Strikeouts

Player	G	IP	W	L	ERA	SO
Rich Folkers	34	82.1	4	4	3.61	44
Jim Bibby	6	16.0	0	2	9.56	12

==== Relief pitchers ====
Note: G = Games pitched; W = Wins; L = Losses; SV = Saves; ERA = Earned run average; SO = Strikeouts

Player	G	W	L	SV	ERA	SO
Diego Seguí	65	7	6	17	2.78	93
Al Hrabosky	44	2	4	5	2.09	57
Orlando Peña	42	4	4	6	2.18	35
Wayne Granger	33	2	4	5	2.78	93
John Andrews	16	1	1	0	4.42	5
Ed Sprague Sr.	8	0	0	0	2.25	2
Al Santorini	6	0	0	0	5.40	2
Eddie Fisher	6	2	1	0	1.29	1
Lew Krausse Jr.	1	0	0	0	0.00	1

== Farm system ==
Level	Team	League	Manager
AAA	Tulsa Oilers	American Association	Jack Krol
AA	Arkansas Travelers	Texas League	Tom Burgess
A	Modesto Reds	California League	Bobby Dews
A	St. Petersburg Cardinals	Florida State League	Roy Majtyka
Rookie	GCL Cardinals	Gulf Coast League	Ken Boyer
Rookie	GCL Redbirds	Gulf Coast League	Lee Thomas

LEAGUE CHAMPIONS: Tulsa, St. Petersburg
