= 1973 Chicago Cubs season =

1973 Chicago Cubs
- League: National League
- Division: East
- Ballpark: Wrigley Field
- City: Chicago
- Record: 77–84 (.478)
- Divisional place: 5th
- Owners: Philip K. Wrigley
- General managers: John Holland
- Managers: Whitey Lockman
- Television: WGN-TV (Jack Brickhouse, Jim West)
- Radio: WGN (Vince Lloyd, Lou Boudreau)
- Stats: ESPN.com; Baseball Reference

The 1973 Chicago Cubs season was the 102nd season of the Chicago Cubs franchise, the 98th in the National League and the 58th at Wrigley Field. The Cubs finished fifth in the National League East with a record of 77–84. After leading the division by 8.5 games on June 29, the team lost 33 of their next 42 games to fall out of first place.

== Offseason ==
- October 27, 1972: Elrod Hendricks was traded by the Cubs to the Baltimore Orioles for Frank Estrada.

== Regular season ==
After a strong finish to the 1972 season, the Cubs dominated the National League East for the first half of 1973. On June 29, they were 47–31 with an 8.5 game lead in the National League East. But then the Cubs fell into a deep swoon, losing 33 of their next 42 games, including 11 straight losses from August 4–16, to fall below.500 and out of the division lead. However, the rest of the division was so mediocre that it was nicknamed the "National League Least", enabling the Cubs to stay in contention even as they remained below.500.

In fact, 1973 was the only season between 1945 and 1984 in which the Cubs were still in contention on the last day of the regular season, September 30. Due to several rainouts, the Cubs still had four games to play against the first place Mets, so double headers were scheduled for September 30 and October 1, the day after the end of the season. If the Cubs were to win all four games, there could have been an unprecedented five-way tie for first place, with each team having a below.500 record of 80–82 (also unprecedented). It would have taken at least three days of games to break a five-way tie.

Rain was still in the forecast for both days, and with Wrigley Field having no lights, National League president Chub Feeney ordered both double headers to start at 10AM (again, unprecedented), making it clear that the umpires would wait out any rain as long as there was daylight.

The Cubs won the first game on September 30, and suddenly it seemed possible that the most unusual end to any season of baseball might happen. But the Mets won the second game, eliminating three of the teams, including the Cubs. On a dismal October 1, in light cold rain, the Mets won the first game and clinched the NL East. The second game was immediately canceled. Milt Pappas was scheduled to pitch for the Cubs in the second game, and the cancellation cost him his chance for his 100th victory in the National League as he retired during the offseason.

=== Season standings ===
NL East
| Team | W | L | Pct. | GB | Home | Road |
|---|---|---|---|---|---|---|
| New York Mets | 82 | 79 | .509 | — | 43‍–‍38 | 39‍–‍41 |
| St. Louis Cardinals | 81 | 81 | .500 | 1½ | 43‍–‍38 | 38‍–‍43 |
| Pittsburgh Pirates | 80 | 82 | .494 | 2½ | 41‍–‍40 | 39‍–‍42 |
| Montreal Expos | 79 | 83 | .488 | 3½ | 43‍–‍38 | 36‍–‍45 |
| Chicago Cubs | 77 | 84 | .478 | 5 | 41‍–‍39 | 36‍–‍45 |
| Philadelphia Phillies | 71 | 91 | .438 | 11½ | 38‍–‍43 | 33‍–‍48 |

=== Record vs. opponents ===
1973 National League record Sources:
| Team | ATL | CHC | CIN | HOU | LAD | MON | NYM | PHI | PIT | SD | SF | STL |
|---|---|---|---|---|---|---|---|---|---|---|---|---|
| Atlanta | — | 7–5 | 5–13 | 11–7 | 2–15–1 | 6–6 | 6–6 | 6–6 | 7–5 | 12–6 | 8–10 | 6–6 |
| Chicago | 5–7 | — | 8–4 | 6–6 | 5–7 | 9–9 | 10–7 | 10–8 | 6–12 | 7–5 | 2–10 | 9–9 |
| Cincinnati | 13–5 | 4–8 | — | 11–7 | 11–7 | 8–4 | 8–4 | 8–4 | 7–5 | 13–5 | 10–8 | 6–6 |
| Houston | 7–11 | 6–6 | 7–11 | — | 11–7 | 6–6 | 6–6 | 7–5 | 6–6 | 10–8 | 11–7 | 5–7 |
| Los Angeles | 15–2–1 | 7–5 | 7–11 | 7–11 | — | 7–5 | 7–5 | 9–3 | 10–2 | 9–9 | 9–9 | 8–4 |
| Montreal | 6–6 | 9–9 | 4–8 | 6–6 | 5–7 | — | 9–9 | 13–5 | 6–12 | 7–5 | 6–6 | 8–10 |
| New York | 6–6 | 7–10 | 4–8 | 6–6 | 5–7 | 9–9 | — | 9–9 | 13–5 | 8–4 | 5–7 | 10–8 |
| Philadelphia | 6–6 | 8–10 | 4–8 | 5–7 | 3–9 | 5–13 | 9–9 | — | 8–10 | 9–3 | 5–7 | 9–9 |
| Pittsburgh | 5–7 | 12–6 | 5–7 | 6–6 | 2–10 | 12–6 | 5–13 | 10–8 | — | 8–4 | 5–7 | 10–8 |
| San Diego | 6–12 | 5–7 | 5–13 | 8–10 | 9–9 | 5–7 | 4–8 | 3–9 | 4–8 | — | 7–11 | 4–8 |
| San Francisco | 10–8 | 10–2 | 8–10 | 7–11 | 9–9 | 6–6 | 7–5 | 7–5 | 7–5 | 11–7 | — | 6–6 |
| St. Louis | 6–6 | 9–9 | 6–6 | 7–5 | 4–8 | 10–8 | 8–10 | 9–9 | 8–10 | 8–4 | 6–6 | — |

=== Notable transactions ===
- May 19, 1973: Joe Pepitone was traded by the Cubs to the Atlanta Braves for Andre Thornton.
- June 5, 1973: 1973 Major League Baseball draft
  - Jerry Tabb was drafted by the Cubs in the 1st round (16th pick).
  - Dave Geisel was drafted by the Cubs in the 5th round.
  - Mike Krukow was drafted by the Cubs in the 8th round. Player signed June 10, 1973.
  - Joe Wallis was drafted by the Cubs in the 6th round.
- August 13, 1973: Rico Carty was purchased by the Cubs from the Texas Rangers.
- August 29, 1973: Pat Bourque was traded by the Cubs to the Oakland Athletics for Gonzalo Márquez.
- September 11, 1973: Rico Carty was purchased from the Cubs by the Oakland Athletics.

=== Roster ===
1973 Chicago Cubs
Roster
| Pitchers: 38 Jack Aker; 33 Bill Bonham; 34 Ray Burris; 40 Larry Gura; 44 Burt Hooton; 31 Ferguson Jenkins; 17 Dave LaRoche; 36 Bob Locker; 32 Milt Pappas; 35 Mike Paul; 46 Juan Pizarro; 48 Rick Reuschel | Catchers: 9 Randy Hundley; 8 Tom Lundstedt; 15 Ken Rudolph; Infielders: 18 Glenn Beckert; 19 Pat Bourque; 23 Carmen Fanzone; 28 Jim Hickman; 11 Don Kessinger; 42 Tony La Russa; 19 Gonzalo Márquez; 8 Joe Pepitone; 22 Paul Popovich; 29 Dave Rosello; 10 Ron Santo; 12 Andre Thornton | Outfielders: 42 Matt Alexander; 1 José Cardenal; 43 Rico Carty; 25 Adrian Garrett; 21 Gene Hiser; 24 Cleo James; 25 Pete LaCock; 7 Rick Monday; 26 Billy Williams | Manager: 16 Whitey Lockman; Coaches: 2 Bobby Adams; 4 Hank Aguirre; 14 Ernie Banks; 3 Larry Jansen; 27 Pete Reiser |

== Player stats ==
=== Batting ===
==== Starters by position ====
Note: Pos = Position; G = Games played; AB = At bats; H = Hits; Avg. = Batting average; HR = Home runs; RBI = Runs batted in

| Pos | Player | G | AB | H | Avg. | HR | RBI |
|---|---|---|---|---|---|---|---|
| C | Randy Hundley | 124 | 368 | 83 | .226 | 10 | 43 |
| 1B | Jim Hickman | 92 | 201 | 49 | .244 | 3 | 20 |
| 2B | Glenn Beckert | 114 | 372 | 95 | .255 | 0 | 29 |
| SS | Don Kessinger | 160 | 577 | 151 | .262 | 0 | 43 |
| 3B | Ron Santo | 149 | 536 | 143 | .267 | 20 | 77 |
| LF | Billy Williams | 156 | 576 | 166 | .288 | 20 | 86 |
| CF | Rick Monday | 149 | 554 | 148 | .267 | 26 | 56 |
| RF | José Cardenal | 145 | 522 | 158 | .303 | 11 | 68 |

==== Other batters ====
Note: G = Games played; AB = At bats; H = Hits; Avg. = Batting average; HR = Home runs; RBI = Runs batted in

| Player | G | AB | H | Avg. | HR | RBI |
|---|---|---|---|---|---|---|
| Paul Popovich | 99 | 280 | 66 | .236 | 2 | 24 |
| Ken Rudolph | 64 | 170 | 35 | .206 | 2 | 17 |
| Carmen Fanzone | 64 | 150 | 41 | .273 | 6 | 22 |
| Pat Bourque | 57 | 139 | 29 | .209 | 7 | 20 |
| Joe Pepitone | 31 | 112 | 30 | .268 | 3 | 18 |
| Gene Hiser | 100 | 109 | 19 | .174 | 1 | 6 |
| Rico Carty | 22 | 70 | 15 | .214 | 1 | 8 |
| Gonzalo Márquez | 19 | 58 | 13 | .224 | 1 | 4 |
| Adrian Garrett | 36 | 54 | 12 | .222 | 3 | 8 |
| Cleo James | 44 | 45 | 5 | .111 | 0 | 0 |
| Dave Rosello | 16 | 38 | 10 | .263 | 0 | 2 |
| Andre Thornton | 17 | 35 | 7 | .200 | 0 | 2 |
| Pete LaCock | 11 | 16 | 4 | .250 | 0 | 3 |
| Matt Alexander | 12 | 5 | 1 | .200 | 0 | 1 |
| Tom Lundstedt | 4 | 5 | 0 | .000 | 0 | 0 |
| Tony La Russa | 1 | 0 | 0 | ---- | 0 | 0 |

=== Pitching ===
==== Starting pitchers ====
Note: G = Games pitched; IP = Innings pitched; W = Wins; L = Losses; ERA = Earned run average; SO = Strikeouts

| Player | G | IP | W | L | ERA | SO |
|---|---|---|---|---|---|---|
| Ferguson Jenkins | 38 | 271.0 | 14 | 16 | 3.89 | 170 |
| Burt Hooton | 42 | 239.2 | 14 | 17 | 3.68 | 134 |
| Rick Reuschel | 36 | 237.0 | 14 | 15 | 3.00 | 168 |
| Milt Pappas | 30 | 162.0 | 7 | 12 | 4.28 | 48 |

==== Other pitchers ====
Note: G = Games pitched; IP = Innings pitched; W = Wins; L = Losses; ERA = Earned run average; SO = Strikeouts

| Player | G | IP | W | L | ERA | SO |
|---|---|---|---|---|---|---|
| Bill Bonham | 44 | 152.0 | 7 | 5 | 3.02 | 121 |
| Larry Gura | 21 | 64.2 | 2 | 4 | 4.87 | 43 |

==== Relief pitchers ====
Note: G = Games pitched; W = Wins; L = Losses; SV = Saves; ERA = Earned run average; SO = Strikeouts

| Player | G | W | L | SV | ERA | SO |
|---|---|---|---|---|---|---|
| Bob Locker | 63 | 10 | 6 | 18 | 2.54 | 76 |
| Jack Aker | 47 | 4 | 5 | 12 | 4.10 | 25 |
| Dave LaRoche | 45 | 4 | 1 | 4 | 5.80 | 34 |
| Ray Burris | 31 | 1 | 1 | 0 | 2.92 | 57 |
| Mike Paul | 11 | 0 | 1 | 0 | 3.44 | 6 |
| Juan Pizarro | 2 | 0 | 1 | 0 | 11.25 | 3 |

== Farm system ==
| Level | Team | League | Manager |
|---|---|---|---|
| AAA | Wichita Aeros | American Association | Jim Marshall |
| AA | Midland Cubs | Texas League | Al Spangler |
| A | Quincy Cubs | Midwest League | Walt Dixon |
| Rookie | GCL Cubs | Gulf Coast League | Q. V. Lowe |
