= 1973 San Francisco Giants season =

1973 San Francisco Giants
- League: National League
- Division: West
- Ballpark: Candlestick Park
- City: San Francisco
- Owners: Horace Stoneham
- General managers: Jerry Donovan
- Managers: Charlie Fox
- Television: KTVU (Lon Simmons, Bill Thompson)
- Radio: KSFO (Lon Simmons, Bill Thompson)

The 1973 San Francisco Giants season was the franchise's 91st season, 16th season in San Francisco and 14th in Candlestick Park. The team finished third in the National League West with a record of 88–74, 11 games behind the Cincinnati Reds.

== Offseason ==
- January 10, 1973: 1973 Major League Baseball draft
  - Rob Picciolo was drafted by the Giants in the 2nd round, but did not sign.
  - Dave Heaverlo was drafted by the Giants in the 1st round (23rd pick) of the Secondary Phase.
- February 7, 1973: Skip Pitlock was traded by the Giants to the Chicago White Sox for Chuck Hartenstein and Glenn Redmon.

== Regular season ==
=== Season standings ===
NL West
| Team | W | L | Pct. | GB | Home | Road |
|---|---|---|---|---|---|---|
| Cincinnati Reds | 99 | 63 | .611 | — | 50‍–‍31 | 49‍–‍32 |
| Los Angeles Dodgers | 95 | 66 | .590 | 3½ | 50‍–‍31 | 45‍–‍35 |
| San Francisco Giants | 88 | 74 | .543 | 11 | 47‍–‍34 | 41‍–‍40 |
| Houston Astros | 82 | 80 | .506 | 17 | 41‍–‍40 | 41‍–‍40 |
| Atlanta Braves | 76 | 85 | .472 | 22½ | 40‍–‍40 | 36‍–‍45 |
| San Diego Padres | 60 | 102 | .370 | 39 | 31‍–‍50 | 29‍–‍52 |

=== Record vs. opponents ===
1973 National League record Sources:
| Team | ATL | CHC | CIN | HOU | LAD | MON | NYM | PHI | PIT | SD | SF | STL |
|---|---|---|---|---|---|---|---|---|---|---|---|---|
| Atlanta | — | 7–5 | 5–13 | 11–7 | 2–15–1 | 6–6 | 6–6 | 6–6 | 7–5 | 12–6 | 8–10 | 6–6 |
| Chicago | 5–7 | — | 8–4 | 6–6 | 5–7 | 9–9 | 10–7 | 10–8 | 6–12 | 7–5 | 2–10 | 9–9 |
| Cincinnati | 13–5 | 4–8 | — | 11–7 | 11–7 | 8–4 | 8–4 | 8–4 | 7–5 | 13–5 | 10–8 | 6–6 |
| Houston | 7–11 | 6–6 | 7–11 | — | 11–7 | 6–6 | 6–6 | 7–5 | 6–6 | 10–8 | 11–7 | 5–7 |
| Los Angeles | 15–2–1 | 7–5 | 7–11 | 7–11 | — | 7–5 | 7–5 | 9–3 | 10–2 | 9–9 | 9–9 | 8–4 |
| Montreal | 6–6 | 9–9 | 4–8 | 6–6 | 5–7 | — | 9–9 | 13–5 | 6–12 | 7–5 | 6–6 | 8–10 |
| New York | 6–6 | 7–10 | 4–8 | 6–6 | 5–7 | 9–9 | — | 9–9 | 13–5 | 8–4 | 5–7 | 10–8 |
| Philadelphia | 6-6 | 8–10 | 4–8 | 5–7 | 3–9 | 5–13 | 9–9 | — | 8–10 | 9–3 | 5–7 | 9–9 |
| Pittsburgh | 5–7 | 12–6 | 5–7 | 6–6 | 2–10 | 12–6 | 5–13 | 10–8 | — | 8–4 | 5–7 | 10–8 |
| San Diego | 6–12 | 5–7 | 5–13 | 8–10 | 9–9 | 5–7 | 4–8 | 3–9 | 4–8 | — | 7–11 | 4–8 |
| San Francisco | 10–8 | 10–2 | 8–10 | 7–11 | 9–9 | 6–6 | 7–5 | 7–5 | 7–5 | 11–7 | — | 6–6 |
| St. Louis | 6–6 | 9–9 | 6–6 | 7–5 | 4–8 | 10–8 | 8–10 | 9–9 | 8–10 | 8–4 | 6–6 | — |

=== Opening Day starters ===
- Bobby Bonds
- Tito Fuentes
- Al Gallagher
- Garry Maddox
- Juan Marichal
- Gary Matthews
- Willie McCovey
- Dave Rader
- Chris Speier

=== Notable transactions ===
- April 2, 1973: Fran Healy was traded by the Giants to the Kansas City Royals for Greg Minton.
- June 5, 1973: Johnnie LeMaster was drafted by the San Francisco Giants in the 1st round (6th pick) of the 1973 amateur draft.
- June 5, 1973: Jeff Little was drafted by the Giants in the 3rd round of the 1973 Major League Baseball draft.
- June 7, 1973: Sam McDowell was purchased from the Giants by the New York Yankees.

=== Roster ===
1973 San Francisco Giants
Roster
| Pitchers: 33 Jim Barr; 40 Tom Bradley; 32 Ron Bryant; 30 Don Carrithers; 34 John D'Acquisto; 27 Juan Marichal; 48 Sam McDowell; 47 Don McMahon; 39 Randy Moffitt; 42 John Morris; 38 Elías Sosa; 49 Charlie Williams; 42 Jim Willoughby | Catchers: 17 Chris Arnold; 14 Dave Rader; 3 Mike Sadek; Infielders: 18 Dámaso Blanco; 23 Tito Fuentes; 10 Al Gallagher; 21 Ed Goodson; 16 Jim Ray Hart; 26 Dave Kingman; 44 Willie McCovey; 29 Bruce Miller; 16 Steve Ontiveros; 10 Mike Phillips; 35 Chris Speier; 12 Gary Thomasson | Outfielders: 25 Bobby Bonds; 19 Jim Howarth; 31 Garry Maddox; 36 Gary Matthews | Manager: 7 Charlie Fox; Coaches: 5 Joey Amalfitano; 8 Andy Gilbert; 47 Don McMahon; 1 John McNamara |

== Player stats ==
| = Indicates team leader |

=== Batting ===
==== Starters by position ====
Note: Pos = Position; G = Games played; AB = At bats; H = Hits; Avg. = Batting average; HR = Home runs; RBI = Runs batted in

| Pos | Player | G | AB | H | Avg. | HR | RBI |
|---|---|---|---|---|---|---|---|
| C | Dave Rader | 148 | 462 | 106 | .229 | 9 | 41 |
| 1B | Willie McCovey | 130 | 383 | 102 | .266 | 29 | 75 |
| 2B | Tito Fuentes | 160 | 656 | 182 | .277 | 6 | 63 |
| SS | Chris Speier | 153 | 542 | 135 | .249 | 11 | 71 |
| 3B | Ed Goodson | 102 | 384 | 116 | .302 | 12 | 53 |
| LF | Gary Matthews | 148 | 540 | 162 | .300 | 12 | 58 |
| CF | Garry Maddox | 144 | 587 | 187 | .319 | 11 | 76 |
| RF | Bobby Bonds | 160 | 643 | 182 | .283 | 39 | 96 |

==== Other batters ====
Note: G = Games played; AB = At bats; H = Hits; Avg. = Batting average; HR = Home runs; RBI = Runs batted in

| Player | G | AB | H | Avg. | HR | RBI |
|---|---|---|---|---|---|---|
| Dave Kingman | 112 | 305 | 62 | .203 | 24 | 55 |
| Gary Thomasson | 112 | 235 | 67 | .285 | 4 | 30 |
| Mike Phillips | 63 | 104 | 25 | .240 | 1 | 9 |
| Jim Howarth | 65 | 90 | 18 | .200 | 0 | 7 |
| Mike Sadek | 39 | 66 | 11 | .167 | 0 | 4 |
| Chris Arnold | 49 | 54 | 16 | .296 | 1 | 13 |
| Steve Ontiveros | 24 | 33 | 8 | .242 | 1 | 5 |
| Bruce Miller | 12 | 21 | 3 | .143 | 0 | 2 |
| Dámaso Blanco | 28 | 12 | 0 | .000 | 0 | 0 |
| Al Gallagher | 5 | 9 | 2 | .222 | 0 | 1 |
| Jim Ray Hart | 5 | 3 | 0 | .000 | 0 | 1 |

=== Pitching ===
| = Indicates league leader |

==== Starting pitchers ====
Note: G = Games pitched; IP = Innings pitched; W = Wins; L = Losses; ERA = Earned run average; SO = Strikeouts

| Player | G | IP | W | L | ERA | SO |
|---|---|---|---|---|---|---|
| Ron Bryant | 41 | 270.0 | 24 | 12 | 3.53 | 143 |
| Jim Barr | 41 | 231.1 | 11 | 17 | 3.81 | 88 |
| Tom Bradley | 35 | 224.0 | 13 | 12 | 3.90 | 136 |
| Juan Marichal | 34 | 207.1 | 11 | 15 | 3.82 | 87 |

==== Other pitchers ====
Note: G = Games pitched; IP = Innings pitched; W = Wins; L = Losses; ERA = Earned run average; SO = Strikeouts

| Player | G | IP | W | L | ERA | SO |
|---|---|---|---|---|---|---|
| Jim Willoughby | 39 | 123.0 | 4 | 5 | 4.68 | 60 |
| John D'Acquisto | 7 | 27.2 | 1 | 1 | 3.58 | 29 |
| Charlie Williams | 12 | 23.0 | 3 | 0 | 6.65 | 11 |

==== Relief pitchers ====
Note: G = Games pitched; W = Wins; L = Losses; SV = Saves; ERA = Earned run average; SO = Strikeouts

| Player | G | W | L | SV | ERA | SO |
|---|---|---|---|---|---|---|
| Elias Sosa | 71 | 10 | 4 | 18 | 3.28 | 70 |
| Randy Moffitt | 60 | 4 | 4 | 14 | 2.42 | 65 |
| Don Carrithers | 25 | 1 | 2 | 0 | 4.81 | 36 |
| Don McMahon | 22 | 4 | 0 | 6 | 1.48 | 20 |
| Sam McDowell | 18 | 1 | 2 | 3 | 4.50 | 35 |
| John Morris | 7 | 1 | 0 | 0 | 8.53 | 3 |
| Dave Kingman | 2 | 0 | 0 | 0 | 9.00 | 4 |

== Awards and honors ==
All-Star Game

- Bobby Bonds, outfield

== Farm system ==
| Level | Team | League | Manager |
|---|---|---|---|
| AAA | Phoenix Giants | Pacific Coast League | Jim Davenport |
| AA | Amarillo Giants | Texas League | Dennis Sommers |
| A | Fresno Giants | California League | Frank Funk |
| A | Decatur Commodores | Midwest League | John VanOrnum |
| Rookie | Great Falls Giants | Pioneer League | Art Mazmanian |
