= Wayne Twitchell =

American baseball player (1948–2010)

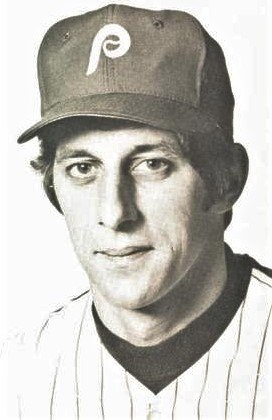
- Pitcher
- Born: March 10, 1948; Portland, Oregon, U.S.
- Died: September 16, 2010 (aged 62); Portland, Oregon, U.S.
- Batted: Right Threw: Right

MLB debut
- September 7, 1970, for the Milwaukee Brewers

Last MLB appearance
- September 27, 1979, for the Seattle Mariners

MLB statistics
- Win–loss record: 48–65
- Earned run average: 3.98
- Strikeouts: 789
- Stats at Baseball Reference

Teams
- Milwaukee Brewers (1970); Philadelphia Phillies (1971–1977); Montreal Expos (1977–1978); New York Mets (1979); Seattle Mariners (1979)

Career highlights and awards
- All-Star (1973)

Wayne Lee Twitchell (March 10, 1948 – September 16, 2010) was an American professional baseball right-handed pitcher. He played in Major League Baseball (MLB) for the Milwaukee Brewers, Philadelphia Phillies, Montreal Expos, New York Mets, and Seattle Mariners.

== Early years ==
Twitchell played basketball, football and baseball at Wilson High School in Portland, Oregon. The University of Arizona offered him a partial scholarship to play quarterback, but when the Houston Astros selected him with the third overall pick in the 1966 Major League Baseball draft, he opted for baseball, instead.

He went 21–26 with a 3.53 earned run average and 402 strikeouts mostly as a starting pitcher over four seasons in the Astros' farm system. After the 1969 season, in one of their last transactions before relocating and becoming the Milwaukee Brewers, the Seattle Pilots purchased Twitchell. He went 9–12 with a 5.44 ERA and 103 strikeouts with the 1970 Portland Beavers. He received a call up to the majors that September, and struck out the side in the only inning he pitched in his major league debut.

His second appearance didn't go as well. He entered in the fifth inning with the Brewers trailing the Kansas City Royals 5–2, and with runners on first and second and one out. He allowed both inherited runners to score, and gave up an additional three runs before getting out of the inning. During Spring training 1971, he was traded to the Philadelphia Phillies for minor league outfielder Pat Skrable.

== Philadelphia Phillies ==
Twitchell spent the 1971 season in triple A, and again received a call up to the majors when rosters expanded in September. His season debut was a start against the New York Mets, in which he allowed three unearned runs in four innings. He faced the Mets again the next day, this time in relief. In 3.1 innings, he struck out five batters. He earned his first career win on September 23 against the Montreal Expos. Over the month, he pitched sixteen innings without allowing an earned run.

The Phillies began the 1972 season with Dick Selma in the starting rotation and Twitchell in the bullpen. On April 18, Twitchell earned his first career save. On June 10, he served up a grand slam to Hank Aaron that put Aaron into second place all-time home run list (649), passing Willie Mays.

He was 2–1 with a 5.49 ERA when manager Frank Lucchesi was replaced with Paul Owens. Shortly after taking over the job, Owens switched Twitchell's and Selma's roles. Twitchell went 3-8 as a starter despite a relatively mild 3.55 ERA. On August 19, he pitched his first career shutout against the franchise that drafted him.

New Phillies manager Danny Ozark moved Twitchell back into the bullpen for the 1973 season. After posting a 1.98 ERA in six relief appearances, Twitchell was moved back into the starting rotation. He pitched consecutive shutouts against the Astros and San Diego Padres on June 5 and 10. He also went 3-for-3 with a double and a run batted in against the Padres.

He was 8–3 with a 2.29 ERA when National League manager Sparky Anderson honored Twitchell as the Phillies' sole representative at the 1973 Major League Baseball All-Star Game. He pitched the sixth inning, and gave up a double to the first batter he faced (Kansas City's John Mayberry). He then struck out Reggie Jackson and retired the next two batters to escape the inning without giving up a run.

When the regular season resumed, he took over where he left off. He shut out the Pittsburgh Pirates and Chicago Cubs in his first two starts after the All-Star break. Facing the Cubs again on September 18, he collided with Billy Williams while covering first base on a ground ball. The collision ended his season. He finished 13–9 with 169 strikeouts. His 2.50 ERA was third best in the NL.

The injury sidelined Twitchell until May the following season. The Phillies were cautious with Twitchell, using him in six short relief appearances before his first start. In which, he was kept in just long enough to be the pitcher of record. He was 5–2 with a 4.14 ERA as a starter when he was used for eleven innings on August 5 against the St. Louis Cardinals. His season took a sharp downward turn from there. He went 0–6 over the remainder of the season with a 6.61 ERA.

Twitchell ended April 1975 at 1–3 with a 7.06 ERA. He pitched better in May (2.81 ERA), but by then the decision had been made to give top prospect and former first round pick Larry Christenson Twitchell's rotation spot. After a final start against the Mets on July 6, Twitchell was moved into the bullpen, and assigned to "mop up duty." Twitchell made fifteen relief appearances over the rest of the season. With the exception of one extra innings game, the Phillies were trailing in each of them when Twitchell was called upon.

He began the 1976 season with the same role. The Phillies were 56–25, and up by ten games in the National League East at the All-Star break. This did not leave a lot of "mop up duty" work, but Twitchell was effective when he did pitch. He allowed four earned runs in 16.2 innings pitched. He was given a more prominent role for the second half of the season, and was 3–1 with a save and a 1.60 ERA. He made two starts, winning one, and losing one.

The 1976 Phillies reached the post season for the first time since 1950. Cincinnati's "Big Red Machine" made short work of them in the 1976 National League Championship Series, sweeping them in three games. Twitchell did not make an appearance.

Twitchell was back to starting in 1977, but after getting off to a 0–4, 4.20 ERA start, he was moved back into the bullpen. On June 13, he suffered his fifth loss of the season. Two days later, he and catcher Tim Blackwell were traded to the Expos for Barry Foote and Dan Warthen.

== Montreal Expos ==
Twitchell won his first two decisions with the Expos. On July 24, he pitched his first complete game in three years, but it was in a losing effort. On August 1, Twitchell pitched nine shutout innings. He was countered, however by Cardinals starter John Urrea, who also pitched nine shutout innings. The Cards pushed across a run in the tenth against Don Stanhouse. His first season with the Expos, Twitchell was 6–5 with a 4.21 ERA.

Twitchell started the 1978 season in the starting rotation, but after going 3–8 with a 5.45 ERA, he was moved into the bullpen. He lost his next two appearances, both extra innings affairs. On September 5, manager Dick Williams used eight relief pitchers in lieu of a starter. Twitchell entered in the fifth and pitched through the seventh to be credited with the win. It was his only win in relief, and the only game that Twitchell appeared in that the Expos won since his third win as a starter on June 6. The Expos released Twitchell at the end of the season.

== New York Mets ==
On April 4, 1979, Twitchell signed as a Free agent with the Mets. His Mets career got off to a rough start. In April, he faced 25 batters, and walked nine of them. He made a start on May 1, and allowed four earned runs in 2.2 innings pitched. At that point his ERA was 12.15; in 6.2 innings pitched, he allowed nine earned runs and an additional five unearned.

He settled down after that. His finest performance as a Met came on June 11 against the Cincinnati Reds. In relief of Jesse Orosco, he pitched 5.1 innings of one hit ball for his first Mets win. His record stood at 5–2 with a 4.61 ERA when he was given a second start. After pitching a scoreless first, he was unable to record an out in the second inning against the Expos. After Rusty Staub led the inning off with a home run, Twitchell walked the bases loaded. Manager Joe Torre pulled him at that point. Reliever Andy Hassler allowed two inherited runners to score. Two weeks later, he was sold to the Seattle Mariners, where he would make four appearances over the rest of the season. After which, he was released, and went into retirement.

== Career stats ==
Seasons	W	L	Pct	ERA	G	GS	CG	SHO	SV	IP	H	ER	R	HR	BB	K	WP	HBP	BAA	Fld%	Avg.
13	48	65	.425	3.98	282	133	15	6	2	1063	983	470	541	92	537	789	58	40	.250	.885	.127

Twitchell was inducted into the Oregon Sports Hall of Fame in 2006. He died of cancer on September 16, 2010. He left behind his wife of 39 years, Barbara, and two sons, Matthew and Patrick.
