= Barry Lersch =

American baseball player (1944–2009)

- Pitcher
- Born: September 7, 1944; Denver, Colorado, U.S.
- Died: October 4, 2009 (aged 65); Aurora, Colorado, U.S.
- Batted: Switch Threw: Right

MLB debut
- April 8, 1969, for the Philadelphia Phillies

Last MLB appearance
- September 21, 1974, for the St. Louis Cardinals

MLB statistics
- Win–loss record: 18–32
- Earned run average: 3.82
- Strikeouts: 317
- Stats at Baseball Reference

Teams
- Philadelphia Phillies (1969–1973); St. Louis Cardinals (1974)

Barry Lee Lersch (September 7, 1944 – October 4, 2009) was an American professional baseball pitcher who played Major League Baseball (MLB) for the Philadelphia Phillies (1969–1973) and St. Louis Cardinals in (1974). A right-hander, he was born in Denver, Colorado and was listed as 6 feet (1.8 m) tall and 175 pounds (79 kg) and attended East High School in Denver, Colorado.

One of Lersch's great baseball moments was a pitching victory in 1964's annual Midnight Sun Game. He defeated the host Alaska Goldpanners of Fairbanks by a score of 10–5; 2,500 people were on hand to witness his win. The game ended at 2:34 a.m. local time and is in the record books as one of the latest-finishing games in amateur baseball history.

Lersch became a professional later that year when, in December 1964, he signed with the Phillies' organization. He made his MLB debut on April 8, 1969 when he surrendered a one-out two-run walk-off homer to Willie Smith in an eleven-inning Opening Day 7–6 loss to the Chicago Cubs at Wrigley Field. He spent four full years (1970 through 1973) in the big leagues. Lersch was primarily a relief pitcher in the majors; of his 169 career games pitched, 53 were starts. He posted an 18–32 won–lost record and a 3.82 career earned run average. All of his decisions (and all but one of his games played) came with struggling Phillies teams. In 5701/3 innings pitched, he allowed 536 hits and 172 bases on balls, and struck out 317. He was credited with nine complete games, six saves and one shutout, a two-hitter against the Montreal Expos on September 30, 1972, at Jarry Park. He was traded along with Craig Robinson from the Phillies to the Braves for Ron Schueler at the Winter Meetings on December 3, 1973.

Lersch died of a heart attack on October 4, 2009, in Aurora, Colorado. He was 65; his body was donated to medical science.
