= Wenty Ford =

Bahamanian baseball player

- Pitcher
- Born: November 25, 1946; Nassau, The Bahamas
- Died: July 8, 1980 (aged 33); Nassau, The Bahamas
- Batted: Right Threw: Right

MLB debut
- September 10, 1973, for the Atlanta Braves

Last MLB appearance
- September 30, 1973, for the Atlanta Braves

MLB statistics
- Win–loss record: 1–2
- Earned run average: 5.51
- Innings pitched: 16 1/3
- Stats at Baseball Reference

Teams
- Atlanta Braves (1973)

Percival Edmund Wentworth Ford (November 25, 1946 – July 8, 1980) was a Bahamian professional baseball player. Born in Nassau, he was a right-handed pitcher who stood 5 feet 11 inches (1.80 m) tall and weighed 165 pounds (75 kg) (11 stone 11). Ford's professional career lasted for ten complete seasons (1966–75), all spent in the Atlanta Braves' organization. He appeared in four Major League Baseball games for the 1973 Braves.

== Early life ==
The fourth of six Major Leaguers to be born in the Bahamas, Ford played both baseball and cricket as a youth. He signed with the Braves as an undrafted free agent and was promoted to the Major Leagues in September 1973 after his eighth season in the Atlanta farm system, when he won 17 of 24 decisions with an earned run average of 2.46 with the Braves' two top minor league affiliates.

== Career ==
In his Major League debut on September 10, 1973, he started against the San Francisco Giants at Atlanta–Fulton County Stadium. Opposing future Baseball Hall of Fame pitcher Juan Marichal, Ford threw a complete game, 10–4 triumph, surrendering five hits (four of them singles) and six bases on balls, with three strikeouts. He also cracked two singles in four at bats. Five days later, he appeared in 3 2/3 innings pitched in relief against the Cincinnati Reds, allowing only two hits and one earned run, but that run came on a ninth-inning, walk-off home run to Tony Pérez to saddle Ford with a loss. He was ineffective in his next two outings, one each as a reliever and starter, and finished his MLB career with a 1–2 record, with 17 hits and eight bases on balls allowed, with four strikeouts, in 16 1/3 innings pitched.

== Death ==
Ford died at age 33 in an automobile accident in Nassau after apparently falling asleep at the wheel of his car while driving home from work. He became the first Major League Baseball player to die in the Bahamas.
