= Jim McKee =

American baseball player (1947–2002)

- Pitcher
- Born: February 1, 1947; Columbus, Ohio, U.S.
- Died: September 14, 2002 (aged 55); Pickaway County, Ohio, U.S.
- Batted: Right Threw: Right

MLB debut
- September 15, 1972, for the Pittsburgh Pirates

Last MLB appearance
- September 29, 1973, for the Pittsburgh Pirates

MLB statistics
- Win–loss record: 1–1
- Earned run average: 4.78
- Strikeouts: 17
- Stats at Baseball Reference

Teams
- Pittsburgh Pirates (1972–1973)

James Marion McKee (February 1, 1947 – September 14, 2002) was an American Major League Baseball pitcher who played for the 1972 and 1973 Pittsburgh Pirates.

An alumnus of Otterbein College, McKee was drafted by the Pittsburgh Pirates in the 4th round of the 1969 amateur draft. He pitched in a total of 17 games for the Pirates, and continued to pitch in their Minor League system until 1974. McKee died as a result of a car accident in 2002 at the age of 55.
