= Danny Ozark =

American baseball coach and manager (1923–2009)

- Manager
- Born: November 24, 1923; Buffalo, New York, U.S.
- Died: May 7, 2009 (aged 85); Vero Beach, Florida, U.S.
- Batted: Right Threw: Right

Career statistics
- Games managed: 1,161
- Managerial record: 618–542
- Winning %: .533
- Stats at Baseball Reference
- Managerial record at Baseball Reference

Teams
- As manager: Philadelphia Phillies (1973–1979); San Francisco Giants (1984); As coach: Los Angeles Dodgers (1965–1972, 1980–1982); San Francisco Giants (1983–1984)

Career highlights and awards
- 2× World Series champion (1965, 1981)

Daniel Leonard Ozark (born Orzechowski; November 26, 1923 – May 7, 2009) was an American professional coach and manager in Major League Baseball (MLB).

As manager of the Philadelphia Phillies, Ozark led the team to three consecutive National League East Division championships (1976–1978), but each year his team fell in the National League Championship Series. He was the fourth manager to reach the Championship Series (National League or American League) in three straight seasons and the first to lose all of them (Whitey Herzog would join him on the same day).

As a coach, he was a member of the World Series championship teams of the 1965 and 1981 Los Angeles Dodgers, under Hall of Fame managers Walter Alston and Tommy Lasorda.

== Baseball career ==
A native of Buffalo, New York, Ozark grew up in Cheektowaga, New York, and attended East High School. Ozark signed with the Brooklyn Dodgers as a teenager and spent over three decades in the Dodger organization. His playing career as a minor league first baseman lasted all or portions of 18 seasons over 22 years (1942; 1946–61; 1963) and was interrupted by United States Army service during World War II, where he saw combat at The Battle of the Bulge. The 6 ft 2 in (1.88 m), 195 lb (88 kg) Ozark, who batted and threw right-handed, hit over 200 home runs during his minor league career, including two 30+ homer seasons. In 1956, he became a playing manager with Brooklyn's Class B Wichita Falls Spudders farm club of the Big State League, and rose through their system in succeeding years all the way to the Triple-A level, winning a division championship with the 1963 Spokane Indians of the Pacific Coast League.

In 1965, he came to the Major Leagues — and the Los Angeles Dodgers — as a coach for Walter Alston. Ozark served eight years (1965–72) on Alston's staff, coaching at first and third bases and in the dugout.

=== Managerial career ===
Ozark was named manager of the last-place Phillies on November 7, 1972. He succeeded Frank Lucchesi, who had been fired four months earlier in July, and general manager Paul Owens, who served in the interim for the remainder of the 1972 campaign — and then hired Ozark. The Phillies showed steady improvement in Ozark's first three seasons, and in 1976 broke through by winning 101 games, a club record at the time. The Philadelphia club featured a core of players led by two future Hall of Famers: third baseman Mike Schmidt and left-handed pitcher Steve Carlton. But in the 1976 NLCS, they faced one of the most powerful teams of the era, the defending world champion Cincinnati Reds, and they dropped the Series in three straight games, as the Reds went on to a second successive title.

In 1977, the Phils again won 101 games to cruise to the NL East title. This time, against the Dodgers, they were poised to take a 2–1 Series lead when Los Angeles rallied for three runs in the ninth inning of Game 3 to steal the victory. The following night, in the midst of a driving rainstorm, the disheartened Phils fell to Tommy John's complete game as the Dodgers won the pennant, three games to one.

In 1978, they won only 90 games, but still prevailed by two games in their division, earning the right to face the Dodgers in an NLCS rematch. Again the Phillies lost in four games.

During the 1978–79 offseason, the Phils signed free agent Pete Rose away from the Reds. Fresh off his 44-game-hitting streak season, Rose was expected to put Philadelphia over the top in 1979. But the Phillies—plagued by injuries and a lack of pitching depth—played poorly all season and were still two games under .500 on August 31 when Ozark was replaced by Dallas Green.

Tommy Lasorda knew Ozark from the Dodger organization and selected Ozark to serve as a coach for the National League team for the 1979 All-Star Game in Seattle. After the Phillies fired him, Ozark returned to the Dodgers in 1980 as third-base coach under Lasorda (and was a member of the Dodgers' 1981 World Series championship team), until the two had a falling-out during the 1982 season and Ozark was released. He joined the archrival San Francisco Giants as a coach in 1983–84 as a member of Frank Robinson's staff, and served as the Giants' interim manager in 1984 when Robinson was fired August 5. The Giants won 24 and lost 32 under Ozark, remaining in the basement of the NL West.

Throughout his managerial career, he was frequently lampooned for his malapropisms as a public speaker. Two of his most famous were "We're alive; we can still tie 'em" and "Even Napoleon had his Watergate."

== Managerial record ==
Team	Year	Regular season					Postseason			
Team	Year	Games	Won	Lost	Win %	Finish	Won	Lost	Win %	Result
PHI	1973	162	71	91	.438	6th in NL East	–	–	–	–
PHI	1974	162	80	82	.494	3rd in NL East	–	–	–	–
PHI	1975	162	86	76	.531	2nd in NL East	–	–	–	–
PHI	1976	162	101	61	.623	1st in NL East	0	3	.000	Lost NLCS (CIN)
PHI	1977	162	101	61	.623	1st in NL East	1	3	.250	Lost NLCS (LAD)
PHI	1978	162	90	72	.556	1st in NL East	1	3	.250	Lost NLCS (LAD)
PHI	1979	133	65	67	.492	(fired)	–	–	–	–
PHI total		1,105	594	510	.538		2	9	.182	–
SF	1984	56	24	32	.429	6th in NL West	–	–	–	–
SF total		56	24	32	.429		–	–	–	–
Total		1,161	618	542	.533		2	9	.182	

== Death ==
On the morning of May 7, 2009, Ozark died at age 85 at his home in Vero Beach, Florida. Ozark was survived by his wife of 60 years, Ginny; two children, Dwain and Darlene; three granddaughters; and four great-grandchildren.

In 2010, Danny Ozark was inducted posthumously into the National Polish-American Sports Hall of Fame.
