= Mike Wallace (baseball) =

American baseball player (born 1951)

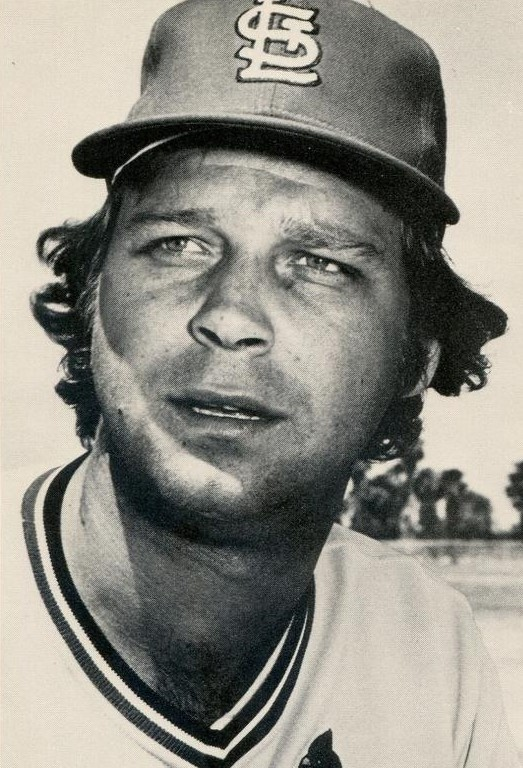
- Pitcher
- Born: February 3, 1951 (age 75); Gastonia, North Carolina, U.S.
- Batted: Left Threw: Left

MLB debut
- June 27, 1973, for the Philadelphia Phillies

Last MLB appearance
- May 1, 1977, for the Texas Rangers

MLB statistics
- Win–loss record: 11–3
- Earned run average: 3.91
- Strikeouts: 105
- Stats at Baseball Reference

Teams
- Philadelphia Phillies (1973–1974); New York Yankees (1974–1975); St. Louis Cardinals (1975–1976); Texas Rangers (1977)

Michael Sherman Wallace (born February 3, 1951) is an American former Major League Baseball pitcher who played from 1973 to 1977 with four teams. He batted and threw left-handed. Wallace had an 11–3 record in 117 career games.

He was drafted by the Philadelphia Phillies in the 4th round (78th overall) of the 1969 amateur baseball draft out of James Madison High School in Vienna, Virginia.

Beginning in 2011, Wallace is a baseball pundit for the Mid-Atlantic Sports Network (MASN). Primarily covering the Washington Nationals, he appears on The Mid-Atlantic Sports Report and Nats Talk.
