= Ron Diorio =

American baseball player (born 1946)

- Relief pitcher
- Born: July 15, 1946 (age 80); Waterbury, Connecticut
- Batted: Right Threw: Right

MLB debut
- August 9, 1973, for the Philadelphia Phillies

Last MLB appearance
- April 7, 1974, for the Philadelphia Phillies

MLB statistics
- Win–loss record: 0–0
- Earned run average: 3.10
- Strikeouts: 11
- Stats at Baseball Reference

Teams
- Philadelphia Phillies (1973–1974)

Ronald Michael Diorio (born July 15, 1946) is an American former professional baseball player. He attended Sacred Heart High School in Waterbury, Connecticut. He played Major League Baseball (MLB) for the Philadelphia Phillies, in 1973 and 1974. He batted and threw right-handed.

Diorio was drafted by the Phillies in the 16th round (366th overall) of the 1969 Major League Baseball draft, out of the University of New Haven. Other picks were hall of famers Bert Blyleven and Dave Winfield

Diorio logged a 0–0 record, with a 3.10 earned run average (ERA), in 25 games played, over the course of his two-year big league career.
