= Ramón Hernández (pitcher) =

Puerto Rican baseball player (1940–2009)

- Pitcher
- Born: August 31, 1940; Carolina, Puerto Rico
- Died: February 4, 2009 (aged 68); Carolina, Puerto Rico
- Batted: Switch Threw: Left

MLB debut
- April 11, 1967, for the Atlanta Braves

Last MLB appearance
- July 27, 1977, for the Boston Red Sox

MLB statistics
- Win–loss record: 23–15
- Earned run average: 3.03
- Strikeouts: 255
- Saves: 46
- Stats at Baseball Reference

Teams
- Atlanta Braves (1967); Chicago Cubs (1968); Pittsburgh Pirates (1971–1976); Chicago Cubs (1976–1977); Boston Red Sox (1977)

Ramón Hernández González (August 31, 1940 – February 4, 2009) was a Puerto Rican professional baseball relief pitcher. He played in Major League Baseball for all or part of nine seasons between 1967 and 1977, including three National League Championship Series for the Pittsburgh Pirates (1972, 1974–75). His most productive season came in 1972, when he finished 5–0 with a 1.67 ERA and 14 saves. Born in Carolina, he was a switch-hitter and threw left-handed.

In a nine-season career, Hernández posted a 23–15 record with a 3.03 ERA and 46 saves in 337 relief appearances, giving up 145 earned runs on 399 hits and 135 walks while striking out 255 in 430 1/3 innings of work.

Hernández died in Carolina, Puerto Rico, at the age of 68.
