= John Morlan =

American baseball player (born 1947)

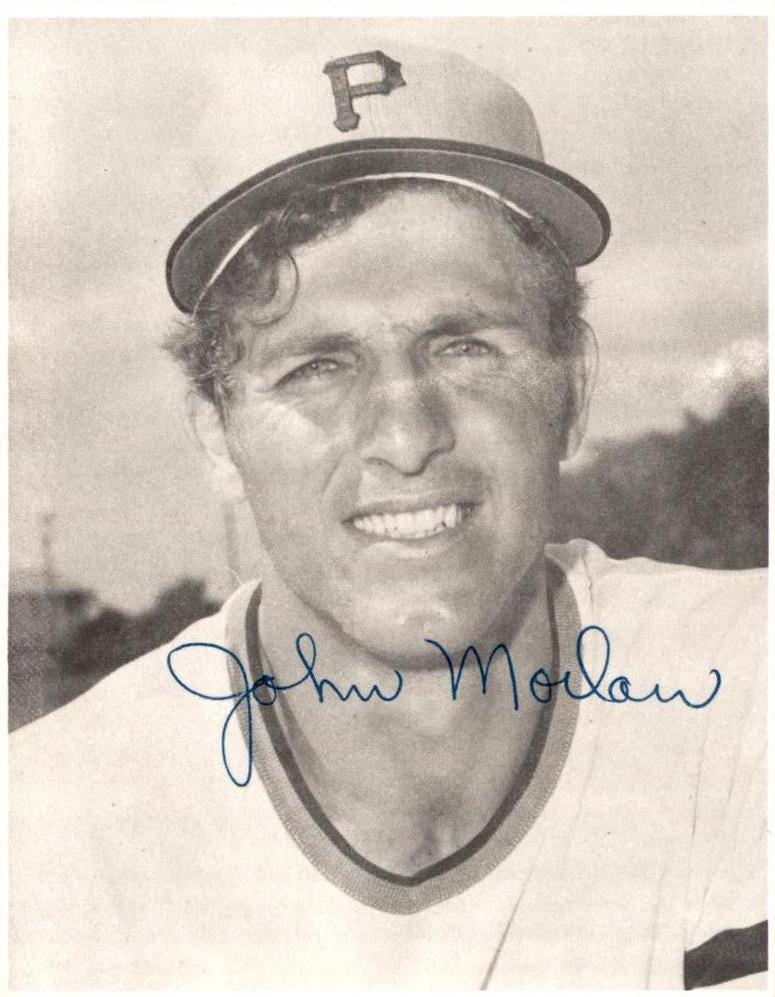
- Pitcher
- Born: November 22, 1947 (age 78); Columbus, Ohio, U.S.
- Batted: Right Threw: Right

MLB debut
- July 20, 1973, for the Pittsburgh Pirates

Last MLB appearance
- September 29, 1974, for the Pittsburgh Pirates

MLB statistics
- Win–loss record: 2–5
- Earned run average: 4.16
- Strikeouts: 61
- Stats at Baseball Reference

Teams
- Pittsburgh Pirates (1973–1974)

John Glen Morlan (born November 22, 1947) is an American former pitcher in Major League Baseball. He played for the Pittsburgh Pirates.
