= Steve Renko =

American baseball player (born 1944)

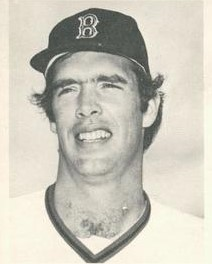
- Pitcher
- Born: December 10, 1944 (age 81); Kansas City, Kansas, U.S.
- Batted: Right Threw: Right

MLB debut
- June 27, 1969, for the Montreal Expos

Last MLB appearance
- August 23, 1983, for the Kansas City Royals

MLB statistics
- Win–loss record: 134–146
- Earned run average: 3.99
- Strikeouts: 1,455
- Stats at Baseball Reference

Teams
- Montreal Expos (1969–1976); Chicago Cubs (1976–1977); Chicago White Sox (1977); Oakland Athletics (1978); Boston Red Sox (1979–1980); California Angels (1981–1982); Kansas City Royals (1983)

Steve Renko, Jr. (born December 10, 1944) is an American former right-handed Major League Baseball pitcher. He played for the Montreal Expos (1969–1976), Chicago Cubs (1976–1977), Chicago White Sox (1977), Oakland Athletics (1978), Boston Red Sox (1979–1980), California Angels (1981–1982) and Kansas City Royals (1983).

== Career ==
Renko attended the University of Kansas, where he played baseball, basketball, American football.and Track and Field

Renko was a 24-year-old minor league pitcher for the New York Mets when he was traded to the Montreal Expos in 1969. It was the Expos' inaugural year in Major League Baseball, and the Mets became the 1969 World Series champions. Renko pitched for the Expos during their first seven seasons (1969–1975), leading the team in wins in 1973 with 15 victories. Renko ranks in the top five of all Expos pitchers with 68 career victories.

He helped the Angels win the 1982 American League Western Division with a win/loss of 11–6.

He was a 15-game winner in 1971 and 1973.

He led the National League in earned runs allowed (115) in 1971.

He led the National League in wild pitches (19) in 1974.

He ranks 99th on the career home runs allowed List (248).

In 15 seasons, he had a 134–146 win-loss record, 451 games, 365 games started, 57 complete games, 9 shutouts, 36 games finished, 6 saves, 2,494 innings pitched, 2,438 hits allowed, 1,233 runs allowed, 1,107 earned runs allowed, 248 home runs allowed, 1,010 walks allowed, 1,455 strikeouts, 22 hit batsmen, 73 wild pitches, 10,704 batters faced, 86 intentional walks, 4 balks, and a 3.99 earned run average. In 1979, he carried a no-hitter into the ninth inning against the Oakland A's in Oakland, only to be broken up by a Rickey Henderson double with one out in the bottom of the ninth. Renko pitched 3 career one-hitters.

As a hitter, Renko was above average for a pitcher, posting a .215 batting average (114-for-531) with 44 runs, 6 home runs, 42 RBI, 3 stolen bases, and 25 bases on balls.
