= 1973 Major League Baseball draft =

Baseball draft of amateur players

Overview
- First selection: David Clyde; Texas Rangers
- First round selections: 24
- Hall of Famers: 3: SS Robin Yount; OF Dave Winfield; 1B Eddie Murray

The 1973 Major League Baseball draft took place during the 1973 MLB season. The draft saw the Texas Rangers select David Clyde first overall.

== First round selections ==
= All-Star	= Baseball Hall of Famer

The following are the first round picks in the 1973 Major League Baseball draft.

Pick	Player	Team	Position	Hometown/School
1	David Clyde	Texas Rangers	LHP	Houston (Westchester High School)
2	John Stearns	Philadelphia Phillies	C	University of Colorado
3	Robin Yount	Milwaukee Brewers	SS	Woodland Hills, California
4	Dave Winfield	San Diego Padres	OF	University of Minnesota
5	Glenn Tufts	Cleveland Indians	1B	Bridgewater, Massachusetts
6	Johnnie LeMaster	San Francisco Giants	SS	Paintsville, Kentucky
7	Billy Taylor	Los Angeles Angels	OF	Savannah, Georgia
8	Gary Roenicke	Montreal Expos	SS	West Covina, California
9	Lew Olsen	Kansas City Royals	RHP	Alamo, California
10	Pat Rockett	Atlanta Braves	SS	San Antonio, Texas
11	Eddie Bane	Minnesota Twins	LHP	Arizona State University
12	Joe Edelen	St. Louis Cardinals	3B-RHP	Gracemont, Oklahoma
13	Doug Heinold	New York Yankees	RHP	Victoria, Texas
14	Lee Mazzilli	New York Mets	OF	Brooklyn, New York
15	Mike Parrott	Baltimore Orioles	RHP	Camarillo, California
16	Jerry Tabb	Chicago Cubs	1B	University of Tulsa
17	Ted Cox	Boston Red Sox	SS	Midwest City, Oklahoma
18	Ted Farr	Los Angeles Dodgers	C	Spokane, Washington
19	Charles Bates	Detroit Tigers	1B	California State University, Los Angeles
20	Calvin Portley	Houston Astros	SS	Longview, Texas
21	Steve Swisher	Chicago White Sox	C	Ohio University
22	Charles Kessler	Cincinnati Reds	OF	Claremont, California
23	Randy Scarbery	Oakland Athletics	RHP	University of Southern California
24	Steve Nicosia	Pittsburgh Pirates	C	North Miami Beach, Florida

* Did not sign

== Other notable selections ==
= All-Star	= Baseball Hall of Famer

Round	Pick	Player	Team	Position
2	41	Fred Lynn	Boston Red Sox	Outfielder
3	49	Len Barker	Texas Rangers	Pitcher
3	57	Ruppert Jones	Kansas City Royals	Outfielder
3	63	Eddie Murray	Baltimore Orioles	Catcher-First Baseman
3	71	Floyd Bannister*	Oakland Athletics	Pitcher
3	72	Mitchell Page	Pittsburgh Pirates	Outfielder
5	109	LaMarr Hoyt	New York Yankees	Pitcher
7	159	Mike Flanagan	Baltimore Orioles	Pitcher
7	167	Matt Keough	Oakland Athletics	Third Baseman-Pitcher
8	170	Randy Lerch	Philadelphia Phillies	Pitcher
8	184	Mike Krukow	Chicago Cubs	Pitcher
8	185	Butch Hobson	Boston Red Sox	Third Baseman
8	188	Ken Landreaux*	Houston Astros	Outfielder
9	210	Bob Stanley*	Los Angeles Dodgers	Pitcher
13	294	Jack Clark	San Francisco Giants	Pitcher-Outfielder
17	404	Joe Sambito	Houston Astros	Pitcher
23	527	Jeff Reardon*	Montreal Expos	Pitcher

* Did not sign

== Background ==
Five dominant players of the late 1970s and 1980s were selected in the June regular phase. Infielder Robin Yount (Milwaukee) and outfielder Dave Winfield (San Diego) were first-rounders, while outfielder Fred Lynn (Boston) was selected in the second round, infielder Eddie Murray (Baltimore) was selected in the third round and starting pitcher Mike Flanagan (Baltimore) was picked in the seventh round.

Winfield stepped off the University of Minnesota campus—where he lettered in three sports—and into the Padres' outfield. He was one of three players from this draft to go directly into the bigs. Highly touted David Clyde was chosen by Texas as the nation's number one pick. He jumped from high school to the majors and won his first game as a Ranger shortly thereafter. But the hard-throwing left-hander developed arm problems and had a short-lived career. Besides Clyde and Winfield, Arizona State's Eddie Bane (Minnesota, 11th overall) went directly to the majors. Other selections of interest included, Jack Clark (San Francisco), who was drafted as a pitcher, and Lee Mazzilli (New York Mets). In the January secondary phase, Dick Ruthven (Philadelphia), Jim Sundberg (Texas) and Donnie Moore (Chicago Cubs), who was drafted as an outfielder, were chosen.

Preceded by Dave Roberts	1st Overall Picks; David Clyde	Succeeded by Bill Almon
