= 1974 Philadelphia Phillies season =

Major League Baseball season

1974 Philadelphia Phillies
- League: National League
- Division: East
- Ballpark: Veterans Stadium
- City: Philadelphia
- Owners: R. R. M. "Ruly" Carpenter III
- General managers: Paul Owens
- Managers: Danny Ozark
- Television: WPHL-TV
- Radio: WCAU (By Saam, Harry Kalas, Richie Ashburn)

The 1974 Philadelphia Phillies season was the 92nd in franchise history. The Phillies finished in third place in the National League East with a record of 80–82, eight games behind the first place Pittsburgh Pirates. They would not finish below .500 again until going 75–87 in the 1985 season.

== Offseason ==
- December 6, 1973: Denny Doyle was sent by the Phillies to the California Angels, and Aurelio Monteagudo and Chris Coletta were sent by the Angels to the Phillies to complete an earlier deal. This deal, made on August 14, involved the Phillies sending a player to be named later to the Angels in exchange for players to be named later and Billy Grabarkewitz.
- December 19, 1973: Tony Taylor was signed as a free agent by the Phillies.

== Regular season ==
Third baseman Mike Schmidt had a breakout season in 1974, leading the National League in home runs and demonstrating his prowess in the field. On June 10, Schmidt hit a ball that many felt should have been a home run when it struck the public address speaker hanging 117 feet above and 329 feet away from home plate at the Astrodome in Houston. The ball hit the speaker, fell onto the field, and, according to the Astrodome's ground rules, remained in play. Since Schmidt had already begun his home run trot, he was credited with only a single. There were runners on first and second base at the time, and they each advanced only one base. Many experts agree that the ball would have traveled in excess of 500 feet.

The Phillies became the first team to lead their division at the All-Star break after finishing last in the division the previous year.

=== Season standings ===
NL East
Team	W	L	Pct.	GB	Home	Road
Pittsburgh Pirates	88	74	.543	—	52‍–‍29	36‍–‍45
St. Louis Cardinals	86	75	.534	1½	44‍–‍37	42‍–‍38
Philadelphia Phillies	80	82	.494	8	46‍–‍35	34‍–‍47
Montreal Expos	79	82	.491	8½	42‍–‍38	37‍–‍44
New York Mets	71	91	.438	17	36‍–‍45	35‍–‍46
Chicago Cubs	66	96	.407	22	32‍–‍49	34‍–‍47

=== Record vs. opponents ===
1974 National League record Sources:
Team	ATL	CHC	CIN	HOU	LAD	MON	NYM	PHI	PIT	SD	SF	STL
Atlanta	—	4–8	7–11–1	6–12	8–10	9–3	8–4	8–4	4–8	17–1	8–10	9–3
Chicago	8–4	—	5–7	4–8	2–10	5–13	8–10	8–10	9–9	6–6	6–6	5–13
Cincinnati	11–7–1	7–5	—	14–4	6–12	6–6	9–3	8–4	8–4	12–6	11–7	6–6
Houston	12–6	8–4	4–14	—	5–13	6–6	6–6	6–6	5–7	7–11	10–8	8–4
Los Angeles	10–8	10–2	12–6	13–5	—	8–4	5–7	6–6	4–8	16–2	12–6	6–6
Montreal	3–9	13–5	6–6	6–6	4–8	—	9–9	11–7	9–9	6–6	4–8	8–9
New York	4–8	10–8	3–9	6–6	7–5	9–9	—	7–11	7–11	6–6	6–6	6–12
Philadelphia	4-8	10–8	4–8	6–6	6–6	7–11	11–7	—	10–8	5–7	8–4	9–9
Pittsburgh	8–4	9–9	4–8	7–5	8–4	9–9	11–7	8–10	—	9–3	8–4	7–11
San Diego	1–17	6–6	6–12	7–11	2–16	6–6	6–6	7–5	3–9	—	11–7	5–7
San Francisco	10–8	6–6	7–11	8–10	6–12	8–4	6–6	4–8	4–8	7–11	—	6–6
St. Louis	3–9	13–5	6–6	4–8	6–6	9–8	12–6	9–9	11–7	7–5	6–6	—

=== Notable transactions ===
- June 5, 1974: 1974 Major League Baseball draft
  - Derek Botelho was drafted by the Phillies in the 26th round but did not sign.
  - Ken Phelps was drafted by the Phillies in the 1st round (19th pick) of the secondary phase but did not sign.
- June 15, 1974: Jeff Schneider was signed as an amateur free agent by the Phillies.
- July 2, 1974: John Poff was signed as an amateur free agent by the Phillies.

=== Game log ===
Legend
	Phillies win
	Phillies loss
	Postponement
**Bold**	Phillies team member

1974 Game Log
Overall Record: 80–82
April (10–11)

#	Date	Opponent	Score	Win	Loss	Save	Attendance	Record
1	April 6	Mets	5–4	**Mac Scarce** (1–0)	Tug McGraw (0–1)	None	40,222	1–0
2	April 7	Mets	2–9	Jon Matlack (1–0)	**Jim Lonborg** (0–1)	Tug McGraw (1)	16,441	1–1
3	April 9	@ Cubs	0–2	Bill Bonham (1–0)	**Ron Schueler** (0–1)	None	30,601	1–2
4	April 10	@ Cubs	6–7	Ray Burris (1–0)	**Mac Scarce** (1–1)	None	6,535	1–3
5	April 11	@ Cubs	4–3	**Frank Linzy** (1–0)	Horacio Piña (0–1)	**Eddie Watt** (1)	2,292	2–3
–	April 13	@ Mets	Postponed (rain); Makeup: April 14 as a traditional double-header					
6	April 14 (1)	@ Mets	2–1 (11)	**Mike Wallace** (1–0)	Tug McGraw (0–2)	None	see 2nd game	3–3
7	April 14 (2)	@ Mets	5–3	**Mac Scarce** (2–1)	Bob Miller (0–1)	None	14,201	4–3
8	April 15	Cardinals	3–2	**Dick Ruthven** (1–0)	Alan Foster (0–1)	**Mac Scarce** (1)	6,713	5–3
9	April 16	Cardinals	10–3	**Steve Carlton** (1–0)	Bob Gibson (0–1)	None	8,107	6–3
10	April 17	Cardinals	12–5	**George Culver** (1–0)	Sonny Siebert (1–1)	None	11,237	7–3
11	April 18	Cardinals	2–6	Lynn McGlothen (2–0)	**Ron Schueler** (0–2)	None	8,106	7–4
12	April 19	Cubs	9–2	**Jim Lonborg** (1–1)	Bill Bonham (1–2)	None	12,318	8–4
13	April 20	Cubs	4–5 (13)	Ray Burris (2–0)	**Mac Scarce** (2–2)	None	16,534	8–5
14	April 21	Cubs	7–3	**Steve Carlton** (2–0)	Burt Hooton (1–1)	None	17,172	9–5
15	April 23	@ Dodgers	3–5	Jim Brewer (2–0)	**Frank Linzy** (1–1)	None	14,984	9–6
16	April 24	@ Dodgers	1–6	Don Sutton (4–1)	**Jim Lonborg** (1–2)	None	14,756	9–7
17	April 25	@ Dodgers	0–1	Tommy John (5–0)	**Dick Ruthven** (1–1)	None	15,117	9–8
18	April 26	@ Padres	2–6	Dave Freisleben (1–0)	**Steve Carlton** (2–1)	None	9,448	9–9
19	April 27	@ Padres	2–5	Randy Jones (2–4)	**Ron Schueler** (0–3)	None	31,407	9–10
20	April 28	@ Padres	4–5	Larry Hardy (1–0)	**Frank Linzy** (1–2)	None	12,031	9–11
21	April 30	@ Giants	6–5	**Frank Linzy** (2–2)	Randy Moffitt (1–2)	**Eddie Watt** (2)	2,188	10–11

May (15–12)

#	Date	Opponent	Score	Win	Loss	Save	Attendance	Record
22	May 1	@ Giants	8–13	Charlie Williams (1–0)	**Steve Carlton** (2–2)	None	2,179	10–12
23	May 3	Dodgers	2–1	**Ron Schueler** (1–3)	Doug Rau (2–1)	**Eddie Watt** (3)	20,186	11–12
24	May 4	Dodgers	7–3	**Jim Lonborg** (2–2)	Don Sutton (4–2)	None	40,301	12–12
25	May 5	Dodgers	3–2	**Mac Scarce** (3–2)	Tommy John (5–1)	None	41,040	13–12
26	May 6	Padres	6–7	Dave Freisleben (3–0)	**Steve Carlton** (2–3)	Rich Troedson (1)	4,149	13–13
27	May 7	Padres	3–5 (13)	Mike Corkins (2–0)	**Dave Wallace** (0–1)	None	4,288	13–14
28	May 8	Padres	4–0	**Jim Lonborg** (3–2)	Randy Jones (2–6)	None	5,081	14–14
29	May 10	Pirates	3–2	**Dick Ruthven** (2–1)	Ken Brett (2–3)	**Mac Scarce** (2)	16,388	15–14
30	May 11	Pirates	3–1	**Steve Carlton** (3–3)	Bob Moose (1–4)	None	21,070	16–14
31	May 12	Pirates	8–7	**Ed Farmer** (1–0)	Dock Ellis (1–3)	**Eddie Watt** (4)	11,243	17–14
32	May 14	Expos	2–9	Steve Rogers (6–1)	**Jim Lonborg** (3–3)	None	8,413	17–15
33	May 15	Expos	4–5	Tom Walker (1–0)	**Mac Scarce** (3–3)	None	10,105	17–16
34	May 16	Expos	6–3	**Steve Carlton** (4–3)	Mike Torrez (3–3)	None	7,311	18–16
–	May 17	@ Pirates	Postponed (rain); Makeup: May 19 as a traditional double-header					
35	May 18	@ Pirates	9–2	**Ron Schueler** (2–3)	Bob Moose (1–5)	None	8,021	19–16
36	May 19 (1)	@ Pirates	3–2	**Jim Lonborg** (4–3)	Dock Ellis (1–4)	**Eddie Watt** (5)	see 2nd game	20–16
37	May 19 (2)	@ Pirates	1–2	Jerry Reuss (2–3)	**Dick Ruthven** (2–2)	None	13,426	20–17
38	May 20	@ Cardinals	2–1	**Steve Carlton** (5–3)	Lynn McGlothen (5–2)	None	12,326	21–17
39	May 21	@ Cardinals	4–2	**Ed Farmer** (2–0)	John Curtis (2–5)	**Mac Scarce** (3)	11,481	22–17
40	May 22	@ Cardinals	7–1	**Ron Schueler** (3–3)	Alan Foster (1–4)	None	10,587	23–17
41	May 24	Expos	2–4	Ernie McAnally (3–4)	**Jim Lonborg** (4–4)	None	14,131	23–18
42	May 25 (1)	Expos	4–3	**Eddie Watt** (1–0)	Mike Torrez (4–4)	None	see 2nd game	24–18
43	May 25 (2)	Expos	4–2	**Steve Carlton** (6–3)	Steve Renko (3–5)	None	41,350	25–18
44	May 26	Expos	1–5	Dennis Blair (1–0)	**Ron Schueler** (3–4)	None	27,324	25–19
45	May 27	@ Braves	1–9	Phil Niekro (6–3)	**Ed Farmer** (2–1)	None	6,446	25–20
46	May 28	@ Braves	1–2 (10)	Danny Frisella (1–2)	**Jim Lonborg** (4–5)	None	see 2nd game	25–21
47	May 29	@ Braves	0–1 (11)	Tom House (1–0)	**Steve Carlton** (6–4)	None	7,816	25–22
48	May 31	Giants	2–6	Ron Bryant (2–4)	**Ron Schueler** (3–5)	Randy Moffitt (12)	23,513	25–23

June (13–14)

#	Date	Opponent	Score	Win	Loss	Save	Attendance	Record
49	June 1	Giants	6–2	**Jim Lonborg** (5–5)	Mike Caldwell (7–3)	None	20,167	26–23
50	June 2	Giants	4–3	**Frank Linzy** (3–2)	Randy Moffitt (2–3)	None	12,280	27–23
51	June 3	Braves	5–2	**Steve Carlton** (7–4)	Carl Morton (6–5)	None	44,179	28–23
52	June 4	Braves	3–7	Roric Harrison (4–6)	**Ron Schueler** (3–6)	Tom House (3)	17,197	28–24
53	June 5	Braves	4–2	**Jim Lonborg** (6–5)	Phil Niekro (6–4)	None	26,204	29–24
54	June 7	Reds	4–7	Pedro Borbón (5–3)	**Mac Scarce** (3–4)	None	22,408	29–25
55	June 8	Reds	6–5	**Steve Carlton** (8–4)	Clay Carroll (3–1)	None	34,256	30–25
56	June 9	Reds	7–14	Don Gullett (6–3)	**Wayne Twitchell** (0–1)	None	33,163	30–26
57	June 10	@ Astros	12–0	**Jim Lonborg** (7–5)	Claude Osteen (5–6)	None	9,487	31–26
58	June 11	@ Astros	1–10	Larry Dierker (4–3)	**Dick Ruthven** (2–3)	None	10,034	31–27
59	June 12	@ Astros	3–0	**Steve Carlton** (9–4)	Don Wilson (3–4)	None	12,010	32–27
60	June 14	@ Reds	4–7	Don Gullett (7–3)	**Ron Schueler** (3–7)	None	25,238	32–28
61	June 15	@ Reds	5–2	**Jim Lonborg** (8–5)	Jack Billingham (6–5)	None	35,732	33–28
62	June 16	@ Reds	0–5	Clay Carroll (4–1)	**Dick Ruthven** (2–4)	None	30,006	33–29
63	June 17	Astros	7–5	**Wayne Twitchell** (1–1)	Claude Osteen (5–7)	None	18,289	34–29
64	June 18	Astros	0–1	Mike Cosgrove (2–0)	**Ron Schueler** (3–8)	None	14,165	34–30
65	June 19	Astros	5–4	**Jim Lonborg** (9–5)	Tom Griffin (7–3)	**Mac Scarce** (4)	17,161	35–30
66	June 20	Mets	1–2	Jerry Koosman (7–4)	**Dick Ruthven** (2–5)	None	22,210	35–31
67	June 21	Mets	1–3	Tom Seaver (4–6)	**Steve Carlton** (9–5)	Tug McGraw (2)	28,262	35–32
68	June 22 (1)	Mets	5–2	**Ron Schueler** (4–8)	Harry Parker (1–7)	None	see 2nd game	36–32
69	June 22 (2)	Mets	8–5	**Wayne Twitchell** (2–1)	George Stone (2–6)	**Jesús Hernáiz** (1)	51,197	37–32
–	June 23	Mets	Postponed (rain); Makeup: September 25 as a traditional double-header					
70	June 24	@ Expos	8–2	**Jim Lonborg** (10–5)	Mike Torrez (7–5)	None	Mike Torrez	38–32
71	June 25	@ Expos	0–5	Steve Renko (5–7)	**Dick Ruthven** (2–6)	None	18,122	38–33
72	June 26	@ Expos	0–2	Steve Rogers (8–8)	**Steve Carlton** (9–6)	None	16,108	38–34
–	June 28	@ Pirates	Postponed (rain); Makeup: June 30 as a traditional double-header					
73	June 29	@ Pirates	3–6	Jerry Reuss (7–5)	**Jim Lonborg** (10–6)	None	15,839	38–35
74	June 30 (1)	@ Pirates	8–11	Ken Brett (10–4)	**Steve Carlton** (9–7)	None	see 2nd game	38–36
75	June 30 (2)	@ Pirates	2–3	Bruce Kison (3–3)	**Ron Schueler** (4–9)	None	25,730	38–37

July (15–13)

#	Date	Opponent	Score	Win	Loss	Save	Attendance	Record
76	July 2	@ Mets	2–4	Tom Seaver (5–6)	**Dick Ruthven** (2–7)	Jack Aker (1)	20,724	38–38
77	July 3	@ Mets	2–6	Harry Parker (2–7)	**Jim Lonborg** (10–7)	None	Jim Lonborg	38–39
78	July 4 (1)	@ Mets	3–5	Jon Matlack (7–5)	**Ron Schueler** (4–10)	None	see 2nd game	38–40
79	July 4 (2)	@ Mets	6–2	**Wayne Twitchell** (3–1)	Ray Sadecki (4–4)	None	26,811	39–40
80	July 5	Padres	8–1	**Steve Carlton** (10–7)	Bill Greif (3–11)	None	42,332	40–40
81	July 6	Padres	6–2	**Dick Ruthven** (3–7)	Lowell Palmer (1–2)	**Mac Scarce** (5)	22,111	41–40
82	July 7	Padres	9–3	**Jim Lonborg** (11–7)	Randy Jones (5–13)	None	34,094	42–40
83	July 8	Dodgers	0–4	Andy Messersmith (9–2)	**Ron Schueler** (4–11)	None	40,208	42–41
84	July 9	Dodgers	4–8	Al Downing (3–3)	**Wayne Twitchell** (3–2)	None	34,320	42–42
85	July 10	Dodgers	5–4	**Jesús Hernáiz** (1–0)	Mike Marshall (11–4)	None	33,812	43–42
86	July 12	@ Giants	6–2	**Dick Ruthven** (4–7)	Elías Sosa (5–5)	None	3,329	44–42
87	July 13	@ Giants	3–13	Mike Caldwell (8–3)	**Jim Lonborg** (11–8)	None	4,720	44–43
88	July 14 (1)	@ Giants	5–2	**Steve Carlton** (11–7)	Ed Halicki (0–1)	None	see 2nd game	45–43
89	July 14 (2)	@ Giants	7–4	**Wayne Twitchell** (4–2)	Tom Bradley (7–10)	None	9,239	46–43
90	July 16	@ Padres	4–5	Vicente Romo (5–4)	**Jesús Hernáiz** (1–1)	None	7,927	46–44
91	July 17	@ Padres	1–15	Randy Jones (7–13)	**Jim Lonborg** (11–9)	None	9,031	46–45
92	July 18	@ Padres	8–5	**Ron Schueler** (5–11)	Vicente Romo (5–5)	None	8,196	47–45
93	July 19	@ Dodgers	0–4	Doug Rau (8–6)	**Wayne Twitchell** (4–3)	None	53,160	47–46
94	July 20	@ Dodgers	5–2	**Jesús Hernáiz** (2–1)	Don Sutton (6–8)	None	52,975	48–46
95	July 21	@ Dodgers	2–1	**Jim Lonborg** (12–9)	Al Downing (3–4)	None	43,710	49–46
–	July 23	**1974 Major League Baseball All-Star Game at Three Rivers Stadium in Pittsburgh**						
96	July 25	@ Cubs	10–2	**Steve Carlton** (12–7)	Burt Hooton (3–9)	None	13,849	50–46
97	July 26	@ Cubs	7–10	Rick Reuschel (10–7)	**Jim Lonborg** (12–10)	None	14,701	50–47
98	July 27 (1)	Pirates	6–5	**Pete Richert** (1–0)	Ken Brett (12–7)	None	see 2nd game	51–47
99	July 27 (2)	Pirates	7–4	**Wayne Twitchell** (5–3)	Bruce Kison (5–5)	**Eddie Watt** (6)	55,066	52–47
100	July 28	Pirates	3–4	Dave Giusti (5–3)	**Mac Scarce** (3–5)	None	34,049	52–48
101	July 29	Pirates	13–1	**Steve Carlton** (13–7)	Jerry Reuss (10–8)	None	27,760	53–48
102	July 30	Cardinals	3–4	Al Hrabosky (5–1)	**Jesús Hernáiz** (2–2)	None	33,382	53–49
103	July 31	Cardinals	8–9	Bob Gibson (6–9)	**Dick Ruthven** (4–8)	Al Hrabosky (4)	33,431	53–50

August (12–17)

#	Date	Opponent	Score	Win	Loss	Save	Attendance	Record
104	August 1	Expos	6–4	**Wayne Twitchell** (6–3)	Ernie McAnally (6–13)	None	20,146	54–50
105	August 2	Expos	2–3	Steve Rogers (11–13)	**Eddie Watt** (1–1)	Chuck Taylor (8)	21,068	54–51
106	August 3	@ Cardinals	3–4	Mike Garman (3–2)	**Jim Lonborg** (12–11)	None	36,053	54–52
107	August 4 (1)	@ Cardinals	6–1	**Ron Schueler** (6–11)	Alan Foster (5–7)	None	see 2nd game	55–52
108	August 4 (2)	@ Cardinals	0–11	John Curtis (6–10)	**Dick Ruthven** (4–9)	None	48,245	55–53
109	August 5	@ Cardinals	2–3 (13)	Mike Garman (4–2)	**Pete Richert** (1–1)	None	33,476	55–54
110	August 6	Cubs	8–3	**Steve Carlton** (14–7)	Jim Todd (2–2)	None	14,490	56–54
111	August 7	Cubs	3–2	**Gene Garber** (2–2)	Oscar Zamora (3–4)	None	11,284	57–54
112	August 8	Cubs	2–1	**Ron Schueler** (7–11)	Bill Bonham (10–14)	**Gene Garber** (2)	11,349	58–54
113	August 9	Braves	2–3 (11)	Lew Krausse Jr. (3–2)	**Mac Scarce** (3–6)	None	28,542	58–55
114	August 10	Braves	4–11	Phil Niekro (13–9)	**Wayne Twitchell** (6–4)	Max León (1)	43,328	58–56
115	August 11	Braves	5–6	Tom House (5–2)	**Steve Carlton** (14–8)	None	41,739	58–57
116	August 12	Giants	4–1	**Jim Lonborg** (13–11)	Ed Halicki (1–6)	None	16,271	59–57
117	August 13	Giants	6–5	**Dick Ruthven** (5–9)	Jim Barr (10–6)	**Ron Schueler** (1)	27,618	60–57
118	August 14	Giants	4–6	Elías Sosa (8–5)	**Mac Scarce** (3–7)	None	24,061	60–58
119	August 16	@ Braves	6–3	**Pete Richert** (2–1)	Phil Niekro (13–10)	None	12,686	61–58
120	August 17	@ Braves	6–7 (12)	Tom House (6–2)	**Mac Scarce** (3–8)	None	45,805	61–59
121	August 18	@ Braves	7–4	**Dick Ruthven** (6–9)	Ron Reed (8–7)	None	11,407	62–59
122	August 19	@ Reds	2–15	Don Gullett (14–8)	**Wayne Twitchell** (6–5)	None	21,806	62–60
123	August 20	@ Reds	1–7	Clay Kirby (8–7)	**Ron Schueler** (7–12)	None	30,448	62–61
124	August 21	@ Reds	10–3	**Jim Lonborg** (14–11)	Tom Carroll (4–1)	None	31,887	63–61
125	August 23	@ Astros	0–1	Larry Dierker (8–8)	**Dick Ruthven** (6–10)	None	12,175	63–62
126	August 24	@ Astros	0–1	Dave Roberts (9–10)	**Steve Carlton** (14–9)	None	12,215	63–63
127	August 25	@ Astros	0–5	Don Wilson (9–10)	**Wayne Twitchell** (6–6)	None	11,405	63–64
128	August 26	Reds	7–6	**Ron Schueler** (8–12)	Clay Carroll (10–4)	None	27,197	64–64
129	August 27	Reds	0–3	Jack Billingham (16–8)	**Dick Ruthven** (6–11)	None	32,106	64–65
130	August 28	Reds	3–4	Will McEnaney (2–1)	**Ron Schueler** (8–13)	Dick Baney (1)	31,535	64–66
131	August 30	Astros	2–3	Don Wilson (10–10)	**Wayne Twitchell** (6–7)	Ken Forsch (6)	17,106	64–67
132	August 31	Astros	10–6	**Larry Christenson** (1–0)	J. R. Richard (1–1)	None	35,257	65–67

September (13–15)

#	Date	Opponent	Score	Win	Loss	Save	Attendance	Record
133	September 1	Astros	8–1	**Dick Ruthven** (7–11)	Tom Griffin (12–8)	None	18,232	66–67
134	September 2 (1)	@ Pirates	4–7	Jerry Reuss (15–9)	**Steve Carlton** (14–10)	None	see 2nd game	66–68
135	September 2 (2)	@ Pirates	1–11	Bruce Kison (7–7)	**Ron Schueler** (8–14)	None	45,181	66–69
136	September 3	@ Pirates	2–8	Jim Rooker (11–10)	**Wayne Twitchell** (6–8)	None	8,168	66–70
137	September 5	@ Cubs	6–5 (11)	**Ron Schueler** (9–14)	Dave LaRoche (3–4)	**Larry Christenson** (1)	1,943	67–70
138	September 6	@ Cubs	4–3	**Dick Ruthven** (8–11)	Burt Hooton (4–11)	None	2,104	68–70
139	September 7	@ Cubs	0–3	Bill Bonham (11–18)	**Steve Carlton** (14–11)	None	10,632	68–71
140	September 8	@ Cubs	11–10	**Gene Garber** (3–2)	Tom Dettore (1–3)	None	14,564	69–71
141	September 9	@ Cardinals	2–0	**Jim Lonborg** (15–11)	John Curtis (8–13)	None	27,801	70–71
142	September 10	@ Cardinals	8–2	**Dick Ruthven** (9–11)	Alan Foster (7–10)	None	27,285	71–71
143	September 11	Pirates	8–5	**Ron Schueler** (10–14)	Ramón Hernández (2–2)	None	21,117	72–71
144	September 12	Pirates	6–4	**Gene Garber** (4–2)	Bruce Kison (7–8)	None	22,135	73–71
145	September 13	Cardinals	3–7 (17)	Ray Bare (1–2)	**Jesús Hernáiz** (2–3)	None	35,290	73–72
146	September 14	Cardinals	2–9	John Curtis (9–13)	**Dick Ruthven** (9–12)	None	40,426	73–73
147	September 15	Cardinals	1–3	Bob Forsch (5–4)	**Steve Carlton** (14–12)	Al Hrabosky (9)	30,142	73–74
148	September 17	Cubs	2–4	Tom Dettore (2–4)	**Wayne Twitchell** (6–9)	Dave LaRoche (4)	10,152	73–75
149	September 18	Cubs	2–5	Steve Stone (8–5)	**Jim Lonborg** (15–12)	Ken Frailing (1)	8,133	73–76
150	September 19	Cubs	4–7	Burt Hooton (6–11)	**Ron Schueler** (10–15)	Dave LaRoche (5)	8,672	73–77
151	September 20	@ Expos	10–2	**Steve Carlton** (15–12)	Steve Renko (11–15)	None	8,166	74–77
–	September 21	@ Expos	Postponed (rain); Makeup: September 22 as a traditional double-header					
152	September 22 (1)	@ Expos	3–2	**Jim Lonborg** (16–12)	Steve Rogers (14–21)	**Gene Garber** (3)	see 2nd game	75–77
153	September 22 (2)	@ Expos	5–8	Mike Torrez (14–8)	**Dick Ruthven** (9–13)	Dale Murray (7)	11,183	75–78
154	September 24	Mets	6–3	**Steve Carlton** (16–12)	Hank Webb (0–2)	**Gene Garber** (4)	11,165	76–78
155	September 25 (1)	Mets	6–2	**Ron Schueler** (11–15)	Tom Seaver (11–10)	**Larry Christenson** (2)	see 2nd game	77–78
156	September 25 (2)	Mets	6–3	**Tom Underwood** (1–0)	Randy Sterling (1–1)	**Gene Garber** (5)	16,221	78–78
157	September 27	@ Expos	0–2	Mike Torrez (15–8)	**Jim Lonborg** (16–13)	None	8,179	78–79
158	September 28	@ Expos	1–3	Steve Renko (12–16)	**Steve Carlton** (16–13)	None	6,499	78–80
159	September 29	@ Expos	3–6	Dennis Blair (11–7)	**Ron Schueler** (11–16)	Dale Murray (10)	23,326	78–81
160	September 30	@ Mets	2–5	Jerry Koosman (15–11)	**Larry Christenson** (1–1)	None	5,931	78–82

October (2–0)

#	Date	Opponent	Score	Win	Loss	Save	Attendance	Record
161	October 1	@ Mets	2–1	**Jim Lonborg** (17–13)	Tom Seaver (11–11)	None	5,341	79–82
162	October 2	@ Mets	3–2 (10)	**Gene Garber** (5–2)	Jon Matlack (13–15)	None	5,383	80–82

=== Roster ===
1974 Philadelphia Phillies
**Roster**
**Pitchers**: 32 Steve Carlton; 38 Larry Christenson; 35 George Culver; 45 Ron Diorio; 43 Ed Farmer; 26 Gene Garber; 47 Jesús Hernáiz; 31 Frank Linzy; 41 Jim Lonborg; 45 Pete Richert; 40 Dick Ruthven; 44 Mac Scarce; 37 Ron Schueler; 48 Erskine Thomason; 33 Wayne Twitchell; 34 Tom Underwood; 46 Dave Wallace; 49 Mike Wallace; 39 Eddie Watt	**Catchers**: 8 Bob Boone; 5 Larry Cox; 6 Jim Essian; 9 John Stearns; **Infielders**: 10 Larry Bowa; 30 Dave Cash; 17 Terry Harmon; 14 Tommy Hutton; 27 Willie Montañez; 20 Mike Schmidt; 12 Tony Taylor	**Outfielders**: 22 Mike Anderson; 15 Alan Bannister; 23 Ollie Brown; 18 Billy Grabarkewitz; 21 Jay Johnstone; 19 Greg Luzinski; 11 Jerry Martin; 24 Bill Robinson; 28 Mike Rogodzinski; 25 Del Unser	**Manager**: 3 Danny Ozark; **Coaches**: 1 Carroll Beringer; 2 Billy DeMars; 4 Ray Rippelmeyer; 7 Bobby Wine

== Player stats ==
=== Batting ===
==== Starters by position ====
Note: Pos = Position; G = Games played; AB = At bats; H = Hits; Avg. = Batting average; HR = Home runs; RBI = Runs batted in

Pos	Player	G	AB	H	Avg.	HR	RBI
C	Bob Boone	146	488	118	.242	3	52
1B	Willie Montañez	143	527	160	.304	7	79
2B	Dave Cash	162	687	206	.300	2	58
SS	Larry Bowa	162	669	184	.275	1	36
3B	Mike Schmidt	162	568	160	.282	36	116
LF	Greg Luzinski	85	302	82	.272	7	48
CF	Del Unser	142	454	120	.264	11	61
RF	Mike Anderson	145	395	99	.251	5	34

==== Other batters ====
Note: G = Games played; AB = At bats; H = Hits; Avg. = Batting average; HR = Home runs; RBI = Runs batted in

Player	G	AB	H	Avg.	HR	RBI
Bill Robinson	100	280	66	.236	5	29
Tommy Hutton	96	208	50	.240	4	33
Jay Johnstone	64	200	59	.295	6	30
Ollie Brown	43	99	24	.242	4	13
Tony Taylor	62	64	21	.328	2	13
Larry Cox	30	53	9	.170	0	4
Billy Grabarkewitz	34	30	4	.133	1	2
Alan Bannister	26	25	3	.120	0	1
Jim Essian	17	20	2	.100	0	0
Terry Harmon	27	15	2	.133	0	0
Mike Rogodzinski	17	15	1	.067	0	1
Jerry Martin	13	14	3	.214	0	1
John Stearns	1	2	1	.500	0	0

=== Pitching ===
==== Starting pitchers ====
Note: G = Games pitched; IP = Innings pitched; W = Wins; L = Losses; ERA = Earned run average; SO = Strikeouts

Player	G	IP	W	L	ERA	SO
Steve Carlton	39	291.0	16	13	3.22	240
Jim Lonborg	39	283.0	17	13	3.21	121
Dick Ruthven	35	212.2	9	13	4.02	153
Ron Schueler	44	203.1	11	16	3.72	109
Wayne Twitchell	25	112.1	6	9	5.21	72

==== Other pitchers ====
Note: G = Games pitched; IP = Innings pitched; W = Wins; L = Losses; ERA = Earned run average; SO = Strikeouts

Player	G	IP	W	L	ERA	SO
Ed Farmer	14	31.0	2	1	8.42	20

==== Relief pitchers ====
Note: G = Games pitched; W = Wins; L = Losses; SV = Saves; ERA = Earned run average; SO = Strikeouts

Player	G	W	L	SV	ERA	SO
Eddie Watt	42	1	1	6	3.99	23
Mac Scarce	58	3	8	5	4.99	50
Gene Garber	34	4	0	4	2.06	27
Jesús Hernáiz	27	2	3	1	5.88	16
Frank Linzy	22	3	2	0	3.28	12
Pete Richert	21	2	1	0	2.21	9
George Culver	14	1	0	0	6.65	9
Larry Christenson	10	1	1	2	4.30	18
Mike Wallace	8	1	0	0	5.40	1
Tom Underwood	7	1	0	0	4.85	8
Dave Wallace	3	0	1	0	9.00	3
Ron Diorio	2	0	0	0	18.00	0
Erskine Thomason	1	0	0	0	0.00	1

== Farm system ==
Level	Team	League	Manager
AAA	Toledo Mud Hens	International League	Jim Bunning
AA	Reading Phillies	Eastern League	Bob Wellman
A	Rocky Mount Phillies	Carolina League	Cal Emery
A	Spartanburg Phillies	Western Carolinas League	Howie Bedell
A-Short Season	Auburn Phillies	New York–Penn League	Larry Rojas
Rookie	Pulaski Phillies	Appalachian League	Bob Wren
