= 1974 St. Louis Cardinals season =

Major League Baseball season

1974 St. Louis Cardinals
- League: National League
- Division: East
- Ballpark: Busch Memorial Stadium
- City: St. Louis, Missouri
- Record: 86–75 (.534)
- Divisional place: 2nd
- Owners: August "Gussie" Busch
- General managers: Bing Devine
- Managers: Red Schoendienst
- Television: KSD-TV (Jack Buck, Mike Shannon, Jay Randolph)
- Radio: KMOX (Jack Buck, Mike Shannon, Bob Starr)

The 1974 St. Louis Cardinals season was the team's 93rd season in St. Louis, Missouri and its 83rd season in the National League. The Cardinals went 86–75 during the season and finished second in the National League East, 1 1/2 games behind the Pittsburgh Pirates.

== Offseason ==
- October 26, 1973: Eddie Fisher was released by the St. Louis Cardinals.
- October 26, 1973: Bernie Carbo and Rick Wise were traded by the Cardinals to the Boston Red Sox for Reggie Smith and Ken Tatum.
- December 5, 1973: Tommie Agee was traded by the Cardinals to the Los Angeles Dodgers for Pete Richert.
- December 7, 1973: Diego Seguí, Reggie Cleveland and Terry Hughes were traded by the Cardinals to the Boston Red Sox for Lynn McGlothen, John Curtis, and Mike Garman.

== Regular season ==
Outfielder Lou Brock led the NL with 118 stolen bases, breaking the modern-era (post-1901) MLB single-season mark of 104, set by Los Angeles Dodgers shortstop Maury Wills in 1962. He also broke the all-time National League record of 111 set by John Montgomery Ward in 1887, when stolen bases were counted differently. Brock broke Wills' record on September 10 in a game against the visiting Philadelphia Phillies. Brock's record still stands as the NL record, but Rickey Henderson of the Oakland Athletics broke the modern MLB mark in 1982, with 130 steals. The all-time MLB record was, and still is, held by Hugh Nicol, who stole 138, also in 1887, while playing in the American Association.

Outfielder Bake McBride won the Rookie of the Year Award this year, batting .309, with 6 home runs and 56 RBIs.

=== Season standings ===
NL East
Team	W	L	Pct.	GB	Home	Road
Pittsburgh Pirates	88	74	.543	—	52‍–‍29	36‍–‍45
St. Louis Cardinals	86	75	.534	1½	44‍–‍37	42‍–‍38
Philadelphia Phillies	80	82	.494	8	46‍–‍35	34‍–‍47
Montreal Expos	79	82	.491	8½	42‍–‍38	37‍–‍44
New York Mets	71	91	.438	17	36‍–‍45	35‍–‍46
Chicago Cubs	66	96	.407	22	32‍–‍49	34‍–‍47

=== Record vs. opponents ===
1974 National League record Sources:
Team	ATL	CHC	CIN	HOU	LAD	MON	NYM	PHI	PIT	SD	SF	STL
Atlanta	—	4–8	7–11–1	6–12	8–10	9–3	8–4	8–4	4–8	17–1	8–10	9–3
Chicago	8–4	—	5–7	4–8	2–10	5–13	8–10	8–10	9–9	6–6	6–6	5–13
Cincinnati	11–7–1	7–5	—	14–4	6–12	6–6	9–3	8–4	8–4	12–6	11–7	6–6
Houston	12–6	8–4	4–14	—	5–13	6–6	6–6	6–6	5–7	7–11	10–8	8–4
Los Angeles	10–8	10–2	12–6	13–5	—	8–4	5–7	6–6	4–8	16–2	12–6	6–6
Montreal	3–9	13–5	6–6	6–6	4–8	—	9–9	11–7	9–9	6–6	4–8	8–9
New York	4–8	10–8	3–9	6–6	7–5	9–9	—	7–11	7–11	6–6	6–6	6–12
Philadelphia	4-8	10–8	4–8	6–6	6–6	7–11	11–7	—	10–8	5–7	8–4	9–9
Pittsburgh	8–4	9–9	4–8	7–5	8–4	9–9	11–7	8–10	—	9–3	8–4	7–11
San Diego	1–17	6–6	6–12	7–11	2–16	6–6	6–6	7–5	3–9	—	11–7	5–7
San Francisco	10–8	6–6	7–11	8–10	6–12	8–4	6–6	4–8	4–8	7–11	—	6–6
St. Louis	3–9	13–5	6–6	4–8	6–6	9–8	12–6	9–9	11–7	7–5	6–6	—

=== Notable transactions ===
- June 5, 1974: 1974 Major League Baseball draft
  - Bill Caudill was drafted by the Cardinals in the 8th round. Player signed June 15, 1974.
  - Paul Molitor was drafted by the Cardinals in the 28th round, but did not sign.
- August 11, 1974: Steve Barber was signed as a free agent by the Cardinals.
- August 15, 1974: Ron Selak (minors) and a player to be named later were traded by the Cardinals to the Houston Astros for Claude Osteen. The Cardinals completed the trade by sending Dan Larson to the Astros on October 14.
- September 5, 1974: Ron Hunt was selected off waivers by the Cardinals from the Montreal Expos.

=== Roster ===
1974 St. Louis Cardinals
Roster
Pitchers: 40 Ray Bare; 22 John Curtis; 36 John Denny; 28 Rich Folkers; 31 Bob Forsch; 27 Alan Foster; 43 Mike Garman; 45 Bob Gibson; 39 Al Hrabosky; 15 Barry Lersch; 47 Lynn McGlothen; 34 Claude Osteen; 36 Orlando Peña; 34 Pete Richert; 42 Sonny Siebert; 46 Mike Thompson	Catchers: 12 Dick Billings; 16 Marc Hill; 15 Tim McCarver; 23 Ted Simmons; Infielders: 1 Luis Alvarado; 29 Jerry DaVanon; 11 Jack Heidemann; 5 Tom Heintzelman; 29 Bob Heise; 18 Keith Hernandez; 24 Jim Hickman; 32 Ron Hunt; 29 Stan Papi; 44 Ken Reitz; 41 Ted Sizemore; 9 Joe Torre; 10 Mike Tyson	Outfielders: 20 Lou Brock; 38 José Cruz; 25 Jim Dwyer; 24 Danny Godby; 46 Larry Herndon; 21 Bake McBride; 26 Luis Meléndez; 29 Jerry Mumphrey; 7 Reggie Smith; Other batters: 19 Richie Scheinblum	Manager: 2 Red Schoendienst; Coaches: 8 Vern Benson; 3 George Kissell; 30 Johnny Lewis; 14 Dave Ricketts; 33 Barney Schultz

== Player stats ==
=== Batting ===
==== Starters by position ====
Note: Pos = Position; G = Games played; AB = At bats; H = Hits; Avg. = Batting average; HR = Home runs; RBI = Runs batted in

Pos	Player	G	AB	H	Avg.	HR	RBI
C	Ted Simmons	152	599	163	.272	20	103
1B	Joe Torre	147	529	149	.282	11	70
2B	Ted Sizemore	129	504	126	.250	2	47
SS	Mike Tyson	151	422	94	.223	1	37
3B	Ken Reitz	154	579	157	.271	7	54
LF	Lou Brock	153	635	194	.306	3	48
CF	Bake McBride	150	559	173	.309	6	56
RF	Reggie Smith	143	517	160	.309	23	100

==== Other batters ====
Note: G = Games played; AB = At bats; H = Hits; Avg. = Batting average; HR = Home runs; RBI = Runs batted in

Player	G	AB	H	Avg.	HR	RBI
José Cruz	107	161	42	.261	5	20
Luis Meléndez	83	124	27	.218	0	8
Tim McCarver	74	106	23	.217	0	11
Jim Dwyer	74	86	24	.279	2	11
Tom Heintzelman	38	74	17	.230	1	6
Jack Heidemann	47	70	19	.271	0	3
Jim Hickman	50	60	16	.267	2	4
Jerry DaVanon	30	40	6	.150	0	4
Luis Alvarado	17	36	5	.139	0	1
Keith Hernandez	14	34	10	.294	0	2
Ron Hunt	12	23	4	.174	0	0
Marc Hill	10	21	5	.238	0	2
Danny Godby	13	13	2	.154	0	1
Bob Heise	3	7	1	.143	0	0
Richie Scheinblum	6	6	2	.333	0	0
Dick Billings	1	5	1	.200	0	0
Stan Papi	8	4	1	.250	0	1
Jerry Mumphrey	5	2	0	.000	0	0
Larry Herndon	12	1	1	1.000	0	0

=== Pitching ===
==== Starting pitchers ====
Note: G = Games pitched; IP = Innings pitched; W = Wins; L = Losses; ERA = Earned run average; SO = Strikeouts

Player	G	IP	W	L	ERA	SO
Bob Gibson	33	240.0	11	13	3.83	129
Lynn McGlothen	31	237.1	16	12	2.69	142
John Curtis	33	195.0	10	14	3.78	89
Alan Foster	31	162.1	7	10	3.88	78
Sonny Siebert	28	133.2	8	8	3.84	68
Bob Forsch	19	100.0	7	4	2.97	39

==== Other pitchers ====
Note: G = Games pitched; IP = Innings pitched; W = Wins; L = Losses; ERA = Earned run average; SO = Strikeouts

Player	G	IP	W	L	ERA	SO
Mike Thompson	19	38.1	0	3	5.63	25
Ray Bare	10	24.1	1	2	5.92	6
Claude Osteen	8	22.2	0	2	4.37	6

==== Relief pitchers ====
Note: G = Games pitched; W = Wins; L = Losses; SV = Saves; ERA = Earned run average; SO = Strikeouts

Player	G	W	L	SV	ERA	SO
Al Hrabosky	65	8	1	9	2.95	82
Mike Garman	64	7	2	6	2.64	45
Rich Folkers	55	6	2	2	3.00	57
Orlando Peña	42	5	2	1	2.60	23
Pete Richert	13	0	0	1	2.38	4
John Denny	2	0	0	0	0.00	1
Barry Lersch	1	0	0	0	40.50	0

== Awards and honors ==
=== League leaders ===
- Lou Brock, National League stolen base leader, 118

== Farm system ==
Level	Team	League	Manager
AAA	Tulsa Oilers	American Association	Ken Boyer
AA	Arkansas Travelers	Texas League	Jack Krol
A	Modesto Reds	California League	Lee Thomas
A	St. Petersburg Cardinals	Florida State League	Roy Majtyka
Rookie	GCL Cardinals	Gulf Coast League	Tom Burgess and Bobby Dews

LEAGUE CHAMPIONS: Tulsa
