= 1974 Houston Astros season =

13th season in Major League Baseball for the Houston Astros

1974 Houston Astros
- League: National League
- Division: West
- Ballpark: Astrodome
- City: Houston, Texas
- Record: 81–81 (.500)
- Divisional place: 4th
- Owners: Roy Hofheinz
- General managers: Spec Richardson
- Managers: Preston Gómez
- Television: KPRC-TV
- Radio: KPRC (AM) (Gene Elston, Loel Passe)

The 1974 Houston Astros season was the 13th season for the Major League Baseball (MLB) franchise located in Houston, Texas, their tenth as the Astros, 13th in the National League (NL), sixth in the NL West division, and tenth at The Astrodome. The Astros entered the season having posted a record of 82–80 for fourth place in the NL West, 17 games behind the division-champion Cincinnati Reds.

The 1974 season was the first for Preston Gómez as manager, the seventh in franchise history, having succeeded Leo Durocher. The season began for Houston on April 5 at Candlestick Park, where pitcher Dave Roberts made his second consecutive Opening Day start for the Astros, who were defeated by the San Francisco Giants, 5–1. The Astros' first-round draft pick in the amateur draft was outfielder Kevin Drake, at 15th overall, and in fourth round, they selected catcher Alan Knicely.

Center fielder César Cedeño represented the Astros and played for the National League at the MLB All-Star Game. It was the third career selection for Cedeño.

The Astros concluded their season with a record of 81–81, in fourth place and 21 games behind the division-champion and NL pennant-winning Los Angeles Dodgers. This continued a streak of three consecutive seasons with a record of .500 or better for Houston, extending the first such streak in franchise history. It was their fourth season overall with a record of .500 or above.

Following the season, Cedeño (third consecutive selection) and Doug Rader (fifth consecutive) each earned Gold Glove Awards. Meanwhile, right fielder Greg Gross was chosen as The Sporting News NL Rookie Player of the Year (Note: From 1961–2003, The Sporting News declared one rookie position player and pitcher from each league, the NL and the American League (AL), for this award. Starting in 2004, this system was modified to selecting one rookie from each league for the award, regardless of position.). Also, Gross (for the outfield) and Larry Milbourne (second baseman) were named to the Topps All-Star Rookie Team.

== Offseason ==
=== Summary ===
Houston concluded the 1973 season with an 82–80 (.506) record, in fourth place and trailing the division-champion Cincinnati Reds by 17 games. For the first time, the Astros produced consecutive winning seasons—also the first two overall—while counting a third season of 81 wins or more (first in 1969). For the second successive campaign, Houston 134 swatted home runs—also a then-club record—and ranked third in the National League. (Note: Surpassed in 1993 with 138.) Center fielder César Cedeño became the first Major League entrant into the 20–50 club over consecutive campaigns. Also for the first time, the Astros headlined three Gold Glove winners: Cedeño, third baseman Doug Rader, and shortstop Roger Metzger. His fourth consecutive Gold Glove accolade, Rader extended a club record.

=== Transactions ===
- March 30, 1974: Larry Yount and Don Stratton (minors) were traded by the Astros to the Milwaukee Brewers for Wilbur Howard.

== Regular season ==
=== Summary ===
==== April ====
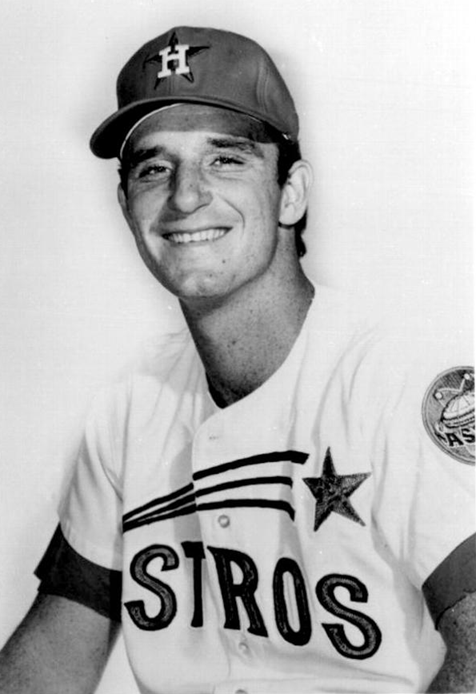
Doug Rader, c. 1971, Houston's first five-time Gold Glove winner

Opening Day starting lineup
Uniform	Player	Position
21	Greg Gross	Right fielder
14	Roger Metzger	Shortstop
28	César Cedeño	Center fielder
27	Bob Watson	Left fielder
8	Milt May	Catcher
23	Lee May	First baseman
12	Doug Rader	Third baseman
19	Tommy Helms	Second baseman
15	Dave Roberts	Pitcher
Venue: Candlestick Park • Final: San Francisco 5, Houston 1 Sources:

The Astros commenced the season at Candlestick Park on April 5, where they were defeated by the San Francisco Giants, 5–1. Dave Roberts, who his second consecutive Opening Day start for Houston. was charged with all five runs over five innings pitched and the defeat. Greg Gross, who collected three of Houston's seven hits, gained the only tally on Bob Watson's run batted in (RBI) single during the top of the ninth.

On April 7, Doug Rader hit his 100th career home run, versus Jim Willoughby at Candlestick during the fourth inning.

Starter Larry Dierker earned his 100th career victory on April 9, tossing 7 innings with 2 runs allowed to lead a 9–5 win over the San Diego Padres. It was Houston first win of the season after having dropped their first three. The Astros mounted a 6–0 lead but withstood the Padres' rally. César Cedeño went 3-for-4 with four RBI, while Gross, the leadoff hitter, added three hits and scored thrice which appended to a torrid start to the season at 10-for-14. Dierker also collected two hits.

On April 29, Lee May tied a major league record by crushing two home runs in one inning, becoming the 17th major leaguer to do so. (Note: On June 24, 1994, Jeff Bagwell became the second Astro to accomplish this feat.) during an all-round record-setting contest. The Astros won, 18–2, over the Chicago Cubs to match their largest-scoring output to date, first registered on July 7, 1971, versus San Francisco. Also, May set a career-high with five hits, becoming the second Astro to record a five-hit, multi-home run game, joining Joe Morgan, who produced a club-record six hits on July 8, 1965. (Note: On May 12, 2019, George Springer became the next Astro to record a five-hit, multi-homer contest.) Meanwhile, César Cedeño tied his career high with three stolen bases, also an Astros record shared with Jimmy Wynn; moreover, Cedeño became the first Astro to steal three bases in a game more than once.

==== May ====
Lee May earned NL Player of the Week honors for the week of April 29—May 5. During that week, he played six games, with five being multi-hit contests. May's slash line was .636 batting average / .667 on-base percentage (OBP) / 1.136 slugging percentage (SLG) / 1.803 on-base plus slugging (OPS), and he had 14 hits, 25 total bases, and 11 RBI.

After crashing into the outfield fence at Riverfront Stadium on May 12, Bob Watson came to boos, ice, and cups hurled by fans of the Cincinnati Reds. He left the game, requiring 20 stitches for a laceration on his face and having broken his glasses.

On May 22, Astros catcher Milt May belted the first pinch-hit, walk-off grand slam in club history, breaking a 1–1 tie with two outs in the bottom of the ninth inning and seal the victory versus the San Diego Padres, (Note: The next similar batting event for the Astros was by Gregg Zaun, on June 27, 2002.) 5–1. Prior to the walk-off slam, the Padres' Randy Jones and Astros' Claude Osteen each traded one-run masterpiece pitching duels through eight innings.. During the bottom of the first inning, Bob Watson doubled in Roger Metzger to pull Houston ahead, 1–0. The status quo maintained until the top of the sixth inning, when Dave Winfield doubled in Enzo Hernández to tie the score, prior to May's walk-off. The fourth walk-off grand slam in team history, May's succeeded Doug Rader on May 27, 1969. (Note: The next walk-off grand slam hit by the Astros was by Kevin Bass on August 20, 1989. The first two in club history were hit by Bob Aspromonte, first on June 11, 1963, and again on August 26, 1966.)

==== June ====
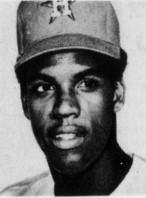
César Cedeño, c. 1973, became the first major leaguer to amass 3 consecutive 20–50 club campaigns.

On June 6, Lee May hit a home run in an even-numbered minute to give fans a free beer. Meanwhile, Larry Dierker pitched a shutout three-hitter in Houston's 4–0 victory.

Don Wilson tossed a shutout masterpiece on June 7 against the New York Mets, and Lee May connected for a solo home run in the second inning as the Astros won, 1–0.

On June 10, Mike Schmidt of the Philadelphia Phillies may have connected for the longest base hit in Astrodome history. His batted fly ball—which ended up as a single—hit the roof and travelled uninterrupted for an estimated 550 feet (170 m).

On June 11, César Cedeño hit his second career grand slam inside the Astrodome, joining teammate Doug Rader (3) to as the only players to have hit multiple grand slams at the Astrodome to that point.

==== July ====
Don Wilson tossed a five-hit shutout of the Atlanta Braves on July 1, leading a 3–0 triumph. At the plate, Wilson also doubled in a run off mound opponent Phil Niekro (8–7). Lee May had two hits and an RBI. César Cedeño, Bob Watson, and Tommy Helms each collected two hits. Wilson (4–5) surrendered four walks and struck out three. Following the shutout, Wilson earned that week's NL Player of the Week honors for July 1 to 7.

Future Astro José Cruz belted the only inside-the-park home run of his career—and lone bomb against Houston—on July 21, off reliever Ken Forsch, scoring the hurler's younger brother, Bob. The drive polished off a 9–1 St. Louis Cardinals triumph as Bob Forsch, also his brother's mound opponent, earned the victory and complete game.

Leading an 8–4 effort on July 30 to topple Cincinnati, Don Wilson earned his 100th career victory, all with the Astros. The right-hander fanned nine over eight innings of work. Meanwhile, César Cedeño and Cliff Johnson connected for solo home runs in support of Wilson, and Lee May drove in three runs.

==== September ====
Approaching his third career no-hit bid on September 4, Don Wilson had completed eight innings against Cincinnati prior to being lifted for pinch hitter Tommy Helms. Wilson had issued just two walks; however, Cincinnati had led, 2–1, after receiving the two walks and an error. César Gerónimo led off the top of the fifth inning by drawing the first walk from Wilson. Next, Dave Concepción struck out, and George Foster drew the second walk. Reds starter Jack Billingham executed a sacrifice bunt to advance Gerónimo and Foster to third base and second, respectively. However, five-time Gold Glove third baseman Doug Rader misplayed Pete Rose's ground ball, allowing both runners to score, giving the Reds a 2–1 lead. (Note: Rose also reached on an error and scored on another error that same inning for the only run during Ken Johnson's no-hitter on April 23, 1964, the only pitcher to ever lose a no-hitter.) Mike Cosgrove relieved Wilson in the ninth and surrendered a leadoff single to Tony Pérez, breaking up the no-hit bid. Billingham reitred the Astros in order in the bottom of the ninth to pick up the complete game victory. Rader was the final out of the game.

On September 28, Don Wilson made and won the final start of his career, one day less nine years following his Major League debut, a two-hit complete game shutout of the Atlanta Braves to lead a 5–0 Astros triumph. Wilson upped his record to 11–13. Tommy Helms connected for his fifth home run and drove in three of the runs. Doug Rader collected three hits and scored two runs. This was the only complete game of Wilson's career in which he did not strike out any batters, and just the fifth bout in which he worked six or more innings without a strikeout.

==== Performance overview ====
Having slugged 26 home runs and pilfered 57 bags, Cedeño achieved another season with 20 home runs—50 stolen bases club, extending his major league record a third successive campaign. Craig Biggio became the next Astro to join the 20—50 club during the 1998 season.

Cedeño's 57 steals broke his own club record of 56 set just the year prior. Moreover, at the time, Cedeño was the only Astro with 50-plus steals in a season, the third of a total of six in succession, through 1977. (Note: For single seasons, playing for HOU, in the regular season, requiring stolen bases ≥ 50, sorted by descending stolen bases.)

For the third consecutive campaign, Doug Rader (third base) and Cedeño (center field) became Gold Glove Award-winning teammates. Rader's fifth, this extended his club record—each won consecutively—while Cedeño garnered his third consecutive.

Rookie right fielder Greg Gross led the club with a .314 batting average while establishing a then-club record with 185 hits, and right-hander Ken Forsch also made a then-club record 70 appearances. Cliff Johnson, who was a force off the bench, as a pinch hitter cranked five home runs and hit .351 (13-for-37) with 13 runs batted in (RBI), 4 bases on balls, .415 on-base percentage and .757 slugging percentage. Gross was chosen as The Sporting News NL Rookie of the Year, the third Astros rookie recognized with this award, preceded by second baseman Joe Morgan (1965) and right-hander Tom Griffin (1969). Gross placed runner-up to Bake McBride of St. Louis in the NL Rookie of the Year voting, joining Morgan (1965) and Sonny Jackson (1966) as the third Astro to receive this ranking.

=== League standings ===
NL West
Team	W	L	Pct.	GB	Home	Road
Los Angeles Dodgers	102	60	.630	—	52‍–‍29	50‍–‍31
Cincinnati Reds	98	64	.605	4	50‍–‍31	48‍–‍33
Atlanta Braves	88	74	.543	14	46‍–‍35	42‍–‍39
Houston Astros	81	81	.500	21	46‍–‍35	35‍–‍46
San Francisco Giants	72	90	.444	30	37‍–‍44	35‍–‍46
San Diego Padres	60	102	.370	42	36‍–‍45	24‍–‍57

=== Record vs. opponents ===
National League

1974 National League record Sources:
Team	ATL	CHC	CIN	HOU	LAD	MON	NYM	PHI	PIT	SD	SF	STL
Atlanta	—	4–8	7–11–1	6–12	8–10	9–3	8–4	8–4	4–8	17–1	8–10	9–3
Chicago	8–4	—	5–7	4–8	2–10	5–13	8–10	8–10	9–9	6–6	6–6	5–13
Cincinnati	11–7–1	7–5	—	14–4	6–12	6–6	9–3	8–4	8–4	12–6	11–7	6–6
Houston	12–6	8–4	4–14	—	5–13	6–6	6–6	6–6	5–7	7–11	10–8	8–4
Los Angeles	10–8	10–2	12–6	13–5	—	8–4	5–7	6–6	4–8	16–2	12–6	6–6
Montreal	3–9	13–5	6–6	6–6	4–8	—	9–9	11–7	9–9	6–6	4–8	8–9
New York	4–8	10–8	3–9	6–6	7–5	9–9	—	7–11	7–11	6–6	6–6	6–12
Philadelphia	4-8	10–8	4–8	6–6	6–6	7–11	11–7	—	10–8	5–7	8–4	9–9
Pittsburgh	8–4	9–9	4–8	7–5	8–4	9–9	11–7	8–10	—	9–3	8–4	7–11
San Diego	1–17	6–6	6–12	7–11	2–16	6–6	6–6	7–5	3–9	—	11–7	5–7
San Francisco	10–8	6–6	7–11	8–10	6–12	8–4	6–6	4–8	4–8	7–11	—	6–6
St. Louis	3–9	13–5	6–6	4–8	6–6	9–8	12–6	9–9	11–7	7–5	6–6	—

=== Notable transactions ===
- June 5, 1974: Alan Knicely was drafted by the Astros in the 3rd round of the 1974 Major League Baseball draft.
- June 17, 1974: Oscar Zamora was purchased from the Astros by the Chicago Cubs.
- August 15, 1974: Claude Osteen was traded by the Astros to the St. Louis Cardinals for Ron Selak (minors) and a player to be named later. The Cardinals completed the trade by sending Dan Larson to the Astros on October 14.

=== Roster ===
1974 Houston Astros
Roster
Pitchers: 37 Mike Cosgrove; 24 Ramón de los Santos; 49 Larry Dierker; 43 Ken Forsch; 38 Tom Griffin; 47 Jerry Johnson; 46 Doug Konieczny; 45 Mike Nagy; 24 Claude Osteen; 50 J. R. Richard; 15 Dave Roberts; 44 Fred Scherman; 31 Paul Siebert; 40 Don Wilson; 42 Jim York	Catchers: 7 Johnny Edwards; 6 Cliff Johnson; 9 Skip Jutze; 8 Milt May; Infielders: 16 Ray Busse; 20 Dave Campbell; 19 Tommy Helms; 9 Mick Kelleher; 23 Lee May; 11 Denis Menke; 14 Roger Metzger; 10 Larry Milbourne; 12 Doug Rader	Outfielders: 31 Ollie Brown; 28 César Cedeño; 25 Bob Gallagher; 21 Greg Gross; 26 Wilbur Howard; 27 Bob Watson; Other batters: 22 Mike Easler	Manager: 18 Preston Gómez; Coaches: 2 Roger Craig; 1 Grady Hatton; 3 Hub Kittle; 5 Bob Lillis

== Player stats ==
=== Batting ===
==== Starters by position ====
Note: Pos = Position; G = Games played; AB = At bats; H = Hits; Avg. = Batting average; HR = Home runs; RBI = Runs batted in

Pos	Player	G	AB	H	Avg.	HR	RBI
C	Milt May	127	405	117	.289	7	54
1B	Lee May	152	556	149	.268	24	85
2B	Tommy Helms	137	452	126	.279	5	50
SS	Roger Metzger	143	572	145	.253	0	30
3B	Doug Rader	152	533	137	.257	17	78
LF	Bob Watson	150	524	156	.298	11	67
CF	César Cedeño	160	610	164	.269	26	102
RF	Greg Gross	156	589	185	.314	0	36

==== Other batters ====
Note: G = Games played; AB = At bats; H = Hits; Avg. = Batting average; HR = Home runs; RBI = Runs batted in

Player	G	AB	H	Avg.	HR	RBI
Cliff Johnson	83	171	39	.228	10	29
Larry Milbourne	112	136	38	.279	0	9
Johnny Edwards	50	117	26	.222	1	10
Wilbur Howard	64	111	24	.216	2	5
Bob Gallagher	102	87	15	.172	0	3
Ollie Brown	27	69	15	.217	3	6
Mick Kelleher	19	57	9	.158	0	2
Ray Busse	19	34	7	.206	0	0
Denis Menke	30	29	3	.103	0	1
Dave Campbell	35	23	2	.087	0	2
Mike Easler	15	15	1	.067	0	0
Skip Jutze	8	13	3	.231	0	1

=== Pitching ===
==== Starting pitchers ====
Note: G = Games pitched; IP = Innings pitched; W = Wins; L = Losses; ERA = Earned run average; SO = Strikeouts

Player	G	IP	W	L	ERA	SO
Larry Dierker	33	223.2	11	10	2.90	150
Tom Griffin	34	211.0	14	10	3.54	110
Don Wilson	33	204.2	11	13	3.08	112
Dave Roberts	34	204.0	10	12	3.40	72
Claude Osteen	23	138.1	9	9	3.71	45
Paul Siebert	5	25.1	1	1	3.55	10

==== Other pitchers ====
Note: G = Games pitched; IP = Innings pitched; W = Wins; L = Losses; ERA = Earned run average; SO = Strikeouts

Player	G	IP	W	L	ERA	SO
J.R. Richard	15	64.2	2	3	4.18	42
Doug Konieczny	6	16.0	0	3	7.88	8

==== Relief pitchers ====
Note: G = Games pitched; W = Wins; L = Losses; SV = Saves; ERA = Earned run average; SO = Strikeouts

Player	G	W	L	SV	ERA	SO
Ken Forsch	70	8	7	10	2.79	48
Fred Scherman	53	2	5	4	4.11	35
Mike Cosgrove	45	7	3	2	3.50	47
Jerry Johnson	34	2	1	0	4.80	32
Jim York	28	2	2	1	3.29	15
Ramón de los Santos	12	1	1	0	2.19	7
Mike Nagy	9	1	1	0	8.53	5

== Awards and achievements ==
=== Offensive achievements ===
==== Grand slams ====
No.	Date	Astros batter	Venue	Inning	Pitcher	Opposing team	Box
1	May 22	Milt May (Note: 1st MLB grand slam) (Note: Pinch hitter)	Astrodome	9 (Note: Walk-off)	Vicente Romo	San Diego Padres	
2	June 11	César Cedeño	Astrodome	7	Dick Ruthven	Philadelphia Phillies	

==== Power—speed club ====
20 home runs—50 stolen bases club
Player	AVG	Runs	HR	SB	PSN
César Cedeño	.269	95	26	57	35.7

=== Pitching achievements ===
==== No-hit bids ====
Date	Starting pitcher (IP)	Relief pitcher(s) (IP)	No-hit IP	GS	Catcher	Batter	Final	Opponent	Box
September 4, 1974	Don Wilson (8)	Mike Cosgrove (0)	8	76	Milt May	Tony Pérez (Note: First batter of ninth inning and first batter faced by Cosgrove.)	1–2	Cincinnati Reds	
Note: Includes those games started with 7 or more no-hit innings.

=== Awards ===
1974 Houston Astros award winners
Name of award		Recipient	Ref.
Baseball Digest Rookie All-Star	Right fielder	Greg Gross	
Gold Glove Award	Third baseman	Doug Rader	
Gold Glove Award	Outfielder	César Cedeño	
Houston Astros Most Valuable Player (MVP)		Greg Gross	
MLB All-Star Game	Reserve outfielder	César Cedeño	
National League (NL) Player of the Week	May 5	Lee May	
National League (NL) Player of the Week	July 7	Don Wilson	
National League (NL) Player of the Week	August 25	Dave Roberts	
The Sporting News NL Rookie Player of the Year		Greg Gross	
Topps All-Star Rookie Team	Second baseman	Larry Milbourne	
Topps All-Star Rookie Team	Outfielder	Greg Gross	

Other awards results

Name of award	Voting recipient(s) (Team)	Ref.
NL Most Valuable Player	1st—Garvey (LAD) • 16th—Cedeño (HOU)	
NL Rookie of the Year	1st—McBride (STL) • 2nd—Gross (HOU)	

=== League leaders ===
NL pitching leaders

- Home runs per nine innings (HR/9): Dave Roberts (0.5)

== Minor league system ==
Level	Team	League	Manager
AAA	Denver Bears	American Association	Frank Verdi
AA	Columbus Astros	Southern League	Jimmy Williams
A	Cedar Rapids Astros	Midwest League	Leo Posada
Rookie	Covington Astros	Appalachian League	Billy Smith

== See also ==
- 20–50 club
- List of Major League Baseball single-inning home run leaders
