= 1974 San Francisco Giants season =

1974 San Francisco Giants
- League: National League
- Division: West
- Ballpark: Candlestick Park
- City: San Francisco
- Owners: Horace Stoneham
- General managers: Jerry Donovan
- Managers: Charlie Fox, Wes Westrum
- Television: KTVU (Al Michaels, Gary Park)
- Radio: KSFO (Al Michaels, Art Eckman)

The 1974 San Francisco Giants season was the Giants' 92nd season in Major League Baseball, their 17th season in San Francisco since their move from New York following the 1957 season, and their 15th at Candlestick Park. The team finished in fifth place in the National League West with a 72–90 record, 30 games behind the Los Angeles Dodgers.

== Offseason ==
- December 7, 1973: Juan Marichal was purchased from the Giants by the Boston Red Sox.
- March 19, 1974: Willie Prall was traded by the Giants to the Chicago Cubs for Ken Rudolph.

== Regular season ==
=== Season standings ===
NL West
Team	W	L	Pct.	GB	Home	Road
Los Angeles Dodgers	102	60	.630	—	52‍–‍29	50‍–‍31
Cincinnati Reds	98	64	.605	4	50‍–‍31	48‍–‍33
Atlanta Braves	88	74	.543	14	46‍–‍35	42‍–‍39
Houston Astros	81	81	.500	21	46‍–‍35	35‍–‍46
San Francisco Giants	72	90	.444	30	37‍–‍44	35‍–‍46
San Diego Padres	60	102	.370	42	36‍–‍45	24‍–‍57

=== Record vs. opponents ===
1974 National League record Sources:
Team	ATL	CHC	CIN	HOU	LAD	MON	NYM	PHI	PIT	SD	SF	STL
Atlanta	—	4–8	7–11–1	6–12	8–10	9–3	8–4	8–4	4–8	17–1	8–10	9–3
Chicago	8–4	—	5–7	4–8	2–10	5–13	8–10	8–10	9–9	6–6	6–6	5–13
Cincinnati	11–7–1	7–5	—	14–4	6–12	6–6	9–3	8–4	8–4	12–6	11–7	6–6
Houston	12–6	8–4	4–14	—	5–13	6–6	6–6	6–6	5–7	7–11	10–8	8–4
Los Angeles	10–8	10–2	12–6	13–5	—	8–4	5–7	6–6	4–8	16–2	12–6	6–6
Montreal	3–9	13–5	6–6	6–6	4–8	—	9–9	11–7	9–9	6–6	4–8	8–9
New York	4–8	10–8	3–9	6–6	7–5	9–9	—	7–11	7–11	6–6	6–6	6–12
Philadelphia	4-8	10–8	4–8	6–6	6–6	7–11	11–7	—	10–8	5–7	8–4	9–9
Pittsburgh	8–4	9–9	4–8	7–5	8–4	9–9	11–7	8–10	—	9–3	8–4	7–11
San Diego	1–17	6–6	6–12	7–11	2–16	6–6	6–6	7–5	3–9	—	11–7	5–7
San Francisco	10–8	6–6	7–11	8–10	6–12	8–4	6–6	4–8	4–8	7–11	—	6–6
St. Louis	3–9	13–5	6–6	4–8	6–6	9–8	12–6	9–9	11–7	7–5	6–6	—

=== Opening Day starters ===
- Bobby Bonds
- Tom Bradley
- Tito Fuentes
- Dave Kingman
- Garry Maddox
- Gary Matthews
- Steve Ontiveros
- Ken Rudolph
- Chris Speier

=== Notable transactions ===
- May 25, 1974: Steve Barber was signed as a free agent by the Giants.
- June 5, 1974: 1974 Major League Baseball draft
  - Alan Wirth was drafted by the Giants in the 3rd round.
  - Guy Sularz was drafted by the Giants in the 10th round.
  - Jeff Yurak was drafted by the Giants in the 24th round.
- August 11, 1974: Steve Barber was released by the Giants.

=== Roster ===
1974 San Francisco Giants
Roster
Pitchers: 43 Steve Barber; 33 Jim Barr; 40 Tom Bradley; 32 Ron Bryant; 37 Mike Caldwell; 34 John D'Acquisto; 28 Ed Halicki; 46 Gary Lavelle; 47 Don McMahon; 48 Butch Metzger; 39 Randy Moffitt; 50 John Montefusco; 43 John Morris; 41 Don Rose; 38 Elías Sosa; 49 Charlie Williams; 42 Jim Willoughby	Catchers: 30 John Boccabella; 12 Dave Rader; 2,6 Ken Rudolph; Infielders: 17 Chris Arnold; 23 Tito Fuentes; 21 Ed Goodson; 26 Dave Kingman; 29 Bruce Miller; 16 Steve Ontiveros; 10 Mike Phillips; 20 Glenn Redmon; 35 Chris Speier	Outfielders: 25 Bobby Bonds; 19 Jim Howarth; 31 Garry Maddox; 36 Gary Matthews; 12 Gary Thomasson; Other batters: 18 Dámaso Blanco	Manager: 7 Charlie Fox; 9 Wes Westrum; Coaches: 5 Joey Amalfitano; 8 Andy Gilbert; 47 Don McMahon; 1 Ozzie Virgil, Sr.

== Player stats ==
= Indicates team leader

=== Batting ===
==== Starters by position ====
Note: Pos = Position; G = Games played; AB = At bats; H = Hits; Avg. = Batting average; HR = Home runs; RBI = Runs batted in

Pos	Player	G	AB	H	Avg.	HR	RBI
C	Dave Rader	113	323	94	.291	1	26
1B	Dave Kingman	121	350	78	.223	18	55
2B	Tito Fuentes	108	390	97	.249	0	22
SS	Chris Speier	141	501	125	.250	9	53
3B	Steve Ontiveros	120	343	91	.265	4	33
LF	Gary Matthews	154	561	161	.287	16	82
CF	Garry Maddox	135	538	153	.284	8	50
RF	Bobby Bonds	150	567	145	.256	21	71

==== Other batters ====
Note: G = Games played; AB = At bats; H = Hits; Avg. = Batting average; HR = Home runs; RBI = Runs batted in

Player	G	AB	H	Avg.	HR	RBI
Gary Thomasson	120	315	77	.244	2	29
Ed Goodson	98	298	81	.272	6	48
Mike Phillips	100	283	62	.219	2	20
Bruce Miller	73	198	55	.278	0	16
Chris Arnold	78	174	42	.241	1	26
Ken Rudolph	57	158	41	.259	0	10
John Boccabella	29	80	11	.138	0	5
Glenn Redmon	7	17	4	.235	0	4
Jim Howarth	6	4	0	.000	0	0
Dámaso Blanco	5	1	0	.000	0	0

=== Pitching ===
==== Starting pitchers ====
Note: G = Games pitched; IP = Innings pitched; W = Wins; L = Losses; ERA = Earned run average; SO = Strikeouts

Player	G	IP	W	L	ERA	SO
Jim Barr	44	239.2	13	9	2.74	84
John D'Acquisto	38	215.0	12	14	3.77	167
Mike Caldwell	31	189.1	14	5	2.95	83
Tom Bradley	30	134.1	8	11	5.16	72
Ed Halicki	16	74.1	1	8	4.24	40
John Montefusco	7	39.1	3	2	4.81	34

==== Other pitchers ====
Note: G = Games pitched; IP = Innings pitched; W = Wins; L = Losses; ERA = Earned run average; SO = Strikeouts

Player	G	IP	W	L	ERA	SO
Ron Bryant	41	126.2	3	15	5.61	75
Charlie Williams	39	100.1	1	3	2.78	48
Jim Willoughby	18	40.2	1	4	4.65	12

==== Relief pitchers ====
Note: G = Games pitched; W = Wins; L = Losses; SV = Saves; ERA = Earned run average; SO = Strikeouts

Player	G	W	L	SV	ERA	SO
Randy Moffitt	61	5	7	15	4.50	49
Elías Sosa	68	9	7	6	3.48	48
John Morris	17	1	1	1	3.05	9
Steve Barber	13	0	1	1	5.27	13
Gary Lavelle	10	0	3	0	2.16	12
Butch Metzger	10	1	0	0	3.55	5
Don McMahon	9	0	0	0	3.09	5
Don Rose	2	0	0	0	9.00	0

== Awards and honors ==
All-Star Game

== Farm system ==
Level	Team	League	Manager
AAA	Phoenix Giants	Pacific Coast League	Rocky Bridges
AA	Amarillo Giants	Texas League	Dennis Sommers
A	Fresno Giants	California League	John VanOrnum
A	Decatur Commodores	Midwest League	Bob Hartsfield
Rookie	Great Falls Giants	Pioneer League	Art Mazmanian

LEAGUE CHAMPIONS: Fresno
