= 1974 Pittsburgh Pirates season =

1974 Pittsburgh Pirates
- National League East champions
- League: National League
- Division: East
- Ballpark: Three Rivers Stadium
- City: Pittsburgh, Pennsylvania
- Record: 88–74 (.543)
- Divisional place: 1st
- Owners: John W. Galbreath (majority shareholder); Bing Crosby, Thomas P. Johnson (minority shareholders)
- General managers: Joe L. Brown
- Managers: Danny Murtaugh
- Television: KDKA-TV; Bob Prince, Nellie King
- Radio: KDKA; Bob Prince, Nellie King

The 1974 Pittsburgh Pirates season was the 93rd season of the Pittsburgh Pirates franchise; the 88th in the National League. The Pirates finished first in the National League East with a record of 88–74. The Pirates were defeated three games to one by the Los Angeles Dodgers in the NLCS.

== Offseason ==
- October 18, 1973: Ken Brett was traded to the Pirates by the Philadelphia Phillies for Dave Cash.
- October 18, 1973: Jerry Reuss was traded to the Pirates by the Houston Astros for Milt May.
- December 4, 1973: Nelson Briles and Fernando Gonzalez were traded by the Pirates to the Kansas City Royals for Ed Kirkpatrick and Kurt Bevacqua.
- December 5, 1973: Luke Walker was sold by the Pirates to the Detroit Tigers.
- December 7, 1973: Bob Johnson was traded by the Pirates to the Cleveland Indians for Burnel Flowers (minors).
- January 9, 1974: Fred Breining was drafted by the Pirates in the 3rd round of the 1974 Major League Baseball draft.
- January 16, 1974: John Lamb was purchased from the Pirates by the Chicago White Sox.
- January 31, 1974: Jackie Hernández was traded by the Pirates to the Philadelphia Phillies for Mike Ryan.
- March 14, 1974: Silvio Martínez was signed as an amateur free agent by the Pirates.
- March 27, 1974: John Lamb was purchased by the Pirates from the Chicago White Sox.
- April 1, 1974: Tom Dettore was traded by the Pirates to the Chicago Cubs for Paul Popovich.

== Regular season ==
=== Season standings ===
NL East
Team	W	L	Pct.	GB	Home	Road
Pittsburgh Pirates	88	74	.543	—	52‍–‍29	36‍–‍45
St. Louis Cardinals	86	75	.534	1½	44‍–‍37	42‍–‍38
Philadelphia Phillies	80	82	.494	8	46‍–‍35	34‍–‍47
Montreal Expos	79	82	.491	8½	42‍–‍38	37‍–‍44
New York Mets	71	91	.438	17	36‍–‍45	35‍–‍46
Chicago Cubs	66	96	.407	22	32‍–‍49	34‍–‍47

=== Record vs. opponents ===
1974 National League record Sources:
Team	ATL	CHC	CIN	HOU	LAD	MON	NYM	PHI	PIT	SD	SF	STL
Atlanta	—	4–8	7–11–1	6–12	8–10	9–3	8–4	8–4	4–8	17–1	8–10	9–3
Chicago	8–4	—	5–7	4–8	2–10	5–13	8–10	8–10	9–9	6–6	6–6	5–13
Cincinnati	11–7–1	7–5	—	14–4	6–12	6–6	9–3	8–4	8–4	12–6	11–7	6–6
Houston	12–6	8–4	4–14	—	5–13	6–6	6–6	6–6	5–7	7–11	10–8	8–4
Los Angeles	10–8	10–2	12–6	13–5	—	8–4	5–7	6–6	4–8	16–2	12–6	6–6
Montreal	3–9	13–5	6–6	6–6	4–8	—	9–9	11–7	9–9	6–6	4–8	8–9
New York	4–8	10–8	3–9	6–6	7–5	9–9	—	7–11	7–11	6–6	6–6	6–12
Philadelphia	4-8	10–8	4–8	6–6	6–6	7–11	11–7	—	10–8	5–7	8–4	9–9
Pittsburgh	8–4	9–9	4–8	7–5	8–4	9–9	11–7	8–10	—	9–3	8–4	7–11
San Diego	1–17	6–6	6–12	7–11	2–16	6–6	6–6	7–5	3–9	—	11–7	5–7
San Francisco	10–8	6–6	7–11	8–10	6–12	8–4	6–6	4–8	4–8	7–11	—	6–6
St. Louis	3–9	13–5	6–6	4–8	6–6	9–8	12–6	9–9	11–7	7–5	6–6	—

=== Game log ===
1974 Game Log: 88–74 (Home: 52–29; Away: 35–45)
April: 6–12 (Home: 3–6; Away: 3–6)

#	Date	Opponent	Score	Win	Loss	Save	Attendance	Record
1	April 5	@ Cardinals	5–6 (10)	Hrabosky	**Giusti** (0–1)	—	24,210	0–1
2	April 6	@ Cardinals	0–8	Siebert	**Moose** (0–1)	—	17,875	0–2
3	April 10	Expos	8–12 (13)	Taylor	**Hernández** (0–1)	—	40,434	0–3
4	April 11	Expos	1–5	Rogers	**Ellis** (0–1)	—	5,606	0–4
5	April 12	Cardinals	6–7 (11)	Garman	**Kison** (0–1)	Folkers	9,524	0–5
6	April 13	Cardinals	4–6	McGlothen	**Rooker** (0–1)	Richert	7,026	0–6
7	April 14	Cardinals	8–4	**Moose** (1–1)	Thompson	—		1–6
8	April 14	Cardinals	5–6	Curtis	**Brett** (0–1)	Folkers	11,949	1–7
9	April 16	@ Cubs	8–5 (12)	**Kison** (1–1)	Paul	—	14,953	2–7
10	April 17	@ Cubs	9–18	Hooton	**Reuss** (0–1)	—	15,560	2–8
11	April 18	@ Cubs	0–1	Frailing	**Rooker** (0–2)	Burris	13,054	2–9
12	April 20	@ Mets	2–5	Koosman	**Moose** (1–2)	—	18,070	2–10
13	April 21	@ Mets	7–0	**Brett** (1–1)	Seaver	—	23,375	3–10
14	April 24	@ Braves	5–3	**Ellis** (1–1)	Niekro	**Giusti** (1)	3,395	4–10
15	April 25	@ Braves	2–3	Reed	**Reuss** (0–2)	—	3,437	4–11
16	April 26	Astros	4–3	**Giusti** (1–1)	Scherman	—	11,145	5–11
17	April 27	Astros	7–10	Griffin	**Moose** (1–3)	—	6,835	5–12
18	April 28	Astros	7–3	**Brett** (2–1)	Osteen	**Giusti** (2)	13,073	6–12

May: 11–15 (Home: 9–7; Away: 2–8)

#	Date	Opponent	Score	Win	Loss	Save	Attendance	Record
19	May 1	Reds	3–5	Carroll	**Morlan** (0–1)	Borbon	8,195	6–13
20	May 3	Braves	4–2	**Reuss** (1–2)	Harrison	—	11,248	7–13
21	May 4	Braves	4–3	**Rooker** (1–2)	Niekro	—	8,069	8–13
22	May 5	Braves	2–3	Reed	**Brett** (2–2)	House	13,596	8–14
23	May 7	@ Astros	1–2	Griffin	**Ellis** (1–2)	—	9,909	8–15
24	May 8	@ Astros	6–8 (12)	Nagy	**Sadowski** (0–1)	—	11,266	8–16
25	May 9	@ Astros	4–1	**Rooker** (2–2)	Roberts	—	10,864	9–16
26	May 10	@ Phillies	2–3	Ruthven	**Brett** (2–3)	Scarce	16,388	9–17
27	May 11	@ Phillies	1–3	Carlton	**Moose** (1–4)	—	21,070	9–18
28	May 12	@ Phillies	7–8	Farmer	**Ellis** (1–3)	Watt	11,243	9–19
29	May 14	Cubs	1–7	Reuschel	**Reuss** (1–3)	—	6,541	9–20
30	May 15	Cubs	3–2 (14)	**Kison** (2–1)	Bonham	—	6,873	10–20
31	May 16	Cubs	5–2	**Brett** (3–3)	Frailing	**Kison** (1)	5,845	11–20
32	May 18	Phillies	2–9	Schueler	**Moose** (1–5)	—	8,021	11–21
33	May 19	Phillies	2–3	Lonborg	**Ellis** (1–4)	Watt		11–22
34	May 19	Phillies	2–1	**Reuss** (2–3)	Ruthven	—	13,426	12–22
35	May 20	@ Expos	2–4	Torrez	**Rooker** (2–3)	Taylor	12,228	12–23
36	May 21	@ Expos	8–4	**Brett** (4–3)	Moore	—	9,231	13–23
37	May 23	@ Expos	4–5	Rogers	**Kison** (2–2)	Taylor	7,209	13–24
38	May 24	Mets	4–1	**Reuss** (3–3)	Matlack	—	12,257	14–24
39	May 25	Mets	3–4	Koosman	**Ellis** (1–5)	—	11,260	14–25
40	May 26	Mets	3–5	Sadecki	**Giusti** (1–2)	Parker	15,573	14–26
41	May 27	Padres	6–0	**Brett** (5–3)	Jones	—		15–26
42	May 27	Padres	8–7	**Tekulve** (1–0)	McAndrew	—	15,367	16–26
43	May 29	Padres	13–3	**Reuss** (4–3)	Hardy	—	4,534	17–26
44	May 31	@ Reds	5–7	Borbon	**Rooker** (2–4)	—	40,205	17–27

June: 15–13 (Home: 9–0; Away: 6–13)

#	Date	Opponent	Score	Win	Loss	Save	Attendance	Record
45	June 1	@ Reds	14–1	**Brett** (6–3)	Nelson	—	36,999	18–27
46	June 2	@ Reds	1–5	Norman	**Kison** (2–3)	—	38,354	18–28
47	June 4	@ Dodgers	0–5	John	**Reuss** (4–4)	—	23,472	18–29
48	June 5	@ Dodgers	2–3	Marshall	**Rooker** (2–5)	—	25,959	18–30
49	June 6	@ Dodgers	0–6	Messersmith	**Brett** (6–4)	—	26,717	18–31
50	June 7	@ Giants	2–6	D'Acquisto	**Demery** (0–1)	—	3,845	18–32
51	June 8	@ Giants	5–2	**Ellis** (2–5)	Bradley	**Kison** (2)	9,138	19–32
52	June 9	@ Giants	14–1	**Reuss** (5–4)	Bryant	—	8,786	20–32
53	June 10	@ Padres	8–9	Romo	**Tekulve** (1–1)	—	7,309	20–33
54	June 11	@ Padres	5–2	**Brett** (7–4)	Jones	—	9,505	21–33
55	June 12	@ Padres	2–5	Freisleben	**Demery** (0–2)	Tomlin	12,336	21–34
56	June 14	Giants	4–2	**Ellis** (3–5)	Bryant	—	18,588	22–34
57	June 15	Giants	3–2 (9)	**Patterson** (1–0)	Sosa	—	13,571	23–34
58	June 16	Giants	4–3	**Rooker** (3–5)	Bradley	—	12,606	24–34
59	June 17	Dodgers	7–3	**Brett** (8–4)	Sutton	—	17,105	25–34
60	June 18	Dodgers	2–0	**Giusti** (2–2)	John	**Patterson** (1)	15,054	26–34
61	June 19	Dodgers	7–3	**Reuss** (6–4)	Rau	—	16,493	27–34
62	June 20	@ Cubs	0–3	Reuschel	**Ellis** (3–6)	—	12,321	27–35
63	June 21	@ Cubs	2–3	Stone	**Rooker** (3–6)	Zamora	11,625	27–36
64	June 22	@ Cubs	6–0	**Brett** (9–4)	Frailing	—	10,069	28–36
65	June 23	@ Cubs	3–7	Bonham	**Giusti** (2–3)	—	24,855	28–37
66	June 24	@ Cardinals	1–3	Foster	**Reuss** (6–5)	Garman		28–38
67	June 24	@ Cardinals	0–4	Gibson	**Demery** (0–3)	—	25,093	28–39
68	June 25	@ Cardinals	7–8	Hrabosky	**Patterson** (1–1)	Curtis	17,392	28–40
69	June 26	@ Cardinals	7–2	**Rooker** (4–6)	Siebert	—	18,487	29–40
70	June 29	Phillies	6–3	**Reuss** (7–5)	Lonborg	—	15,839	30–40
71	June 30	Phillies	11–8	**Brett** (10–4)	Carlton	—		31–40
72	June 30	Phillies	3–2	**Kison** (3–3)	Schueler	—	25,730	32–40

July: 18–14 (Home: 8–7; Away: 10–7)

#	Date	Opponent	Score	Win	Loss	Save	Attendance	Record
73	July 2	Expos	4–2	**Rooker** (5–6)	Montague	—	13,138	33–40
74	July 3	Expos	2–1	**Reuss** (8–5)	Montague	—	11,123	34–40
75	July 4	Expos	1–2	Rogers	**Brett** (10–5)	—		34–41
76	July 4	Expos	3–2	**Kison** (4–3)	Blair	—	22,456	35–41
77	July 5	@ Astros	1–7	Dierker	**Ellis** (3–7)	—	23,047	35–42
78	July 6	@ Astros	0–1	Wilson	**Kison** (4–4)	—	29,640	35–43
79	July 7	@ Astros	6–4 (10)	**Giusti** (3–3)	Scherman	—	18,984	36–43
80	July 8	Braves	0–5	Leon	**Reuss** (8–6)	—	11,494	36–44
81	July 9	Braves	5–4	**Brett** (11–5)	Niekro	**Giusti** (3)	13,737	37–44
82	July 10	Braves	5–10	Morton	**Ellis** (3–8)	—	13,922	37–45
83	July 12	Reds	0–7	Gullett	**Rooker** (5–7)	—		37–46
84	July 12	Reds	3–4	Carroll	**Demery** (0–4)	Carroll	30,507	37–47
85	July 13	Reds	4–9	Hall	**Reuss** (8–7)	Borbon	15,386	37–48
86	July 14	Reds	2–3	Norman	**Brett** (11–6)	Carroll		37–49
87	July 14	Reds	2–1	**Kison** (5–4)	Billingham	**Giusti** (4)	27,151	38–49
88	July 15	Astros	3–1	**Ellis** (4–8)	Roberts	—	9,171	39–49
89	July 16	Astros	6–2	**Rooker** (6–7)	Dierker	—	9,935	40–49
90	July 17	Astros	11–3	**Demery** (1–4)	Wilson	—	10,941	41–49
91	July 18	@ Braves	4–0	**Reuss** (9–7)	Reed	—	8,262	42–49
92	July 19	@ Braves	2–0	**Brett** (12–6)	Niekro	**Giusti** (5)	9,583	43–49
93	July 20	@ Braves	7–6 (11)	**Giusti** (4–3)	Frisella	—	40,225	44–49
94	July 21	@ Braves	6–2	**Ellis** (5–8)	Capra	—	9,351	45–49
95	July 25	@ Expos	5–10	Renko	**Rooker** (6–8)	—		45–50
96	July 25	@ Expos	3–2	**Reuss** (10–7)	Rogers	**Giusti** (6)	27,283	46–50
97	July 26	@ Expos	3–0	**Ellis** (6–8)	Blair	**Hernández** (1)	22,278	47–50
98	July 27	@ Phillies	5–6	Richert	**Brett** (12–7)	—		47–51
99	July 27	@ Phillies	4–7	Twitchell	**Kison** (5–5)	Watt	55,066	47–52
100	July 28	@ Phillies	4–3	**Giusti** (5–3)	Scarce	—	34,049	48–52
101	July 29	@ Phillies	1–13	Carlton	**Reuss** (10–8)	—	27,760	48–53
102	July 30	@ Mets	6–0	**Rooker** (7–8)	Matlack	—		49–53
103	July 30	@ Mets	3–4	Koosman	**Kison** (5–6)	—	39,246	49–54
104	July 31	@ Mets	8–3	**Ellis** (7–8)	Seaver	—	23,281	50–54

August: 20–8 (Home: 11–6; Away: 9–2)

#	Date	Opponent	Score	Win	Loss	Save	Attendance	Record
105	August 1	Cardinals	2–5 (11)	Folkers	**Giusti** (5–4)	—	17,318	50–55
106	August 2	Cardinals	3–2 (14)	**Hernández** (1–1)	Pena	—	19,385	51–55
107	August 3	Cubs	3–4	Reuschel	**Reuss** (10–9)	LaRoche	9,316	51–56
108	August 4	Cubs	3–4	Bonham	**Rooker** (7–9)	—		51–57
109	August 4	Cubs	7–1	**Kison** (6–6)	Hutson	—	23,536	52–57
110	August 6	Mets	9–8 (11)	**Patterson** (2–1)	McGraw	—	12,441	53–57
111	August 7	Mets	10–1	**Demery** (2–4)	Parker	—	13,360	54–57
112	August 8	Mets	4–3	**Reuss** (11–9)	Matlack	—	11,191	55–57
113	August 9	Padres	7–3	**Rooker** (8–9)	Jones	—	11,507	56–57
114	August 10	Padres	4–8	Freisleben	**Morlan** (0–2)	—	15,150	56–58
115	August 11	Padres	8–1	**Ellis** (8–8)	Spillner	—	14,726	57–58
116	August 12	@ Reds	7–4	**Reuss** (12–9)	Kirby	**Giusti** (7)	30,327	58–58
117	August 13	@ Reds	14–3	**Demery** (3–4)	Billingham	—	32,280	59–58
118	August 14	@ Reds	2–3 (10)	Carroll	**Kison** (6–7)	—	30,018	59–59
119	August 16	Dodgers	5–2	**Ellis** (9–8)	Sutton	—	32,347	60–59
120	August 17	Dodgers	4–3	**Reuss** (13–9)	Messersmith	**Giusti** (8)	18,681	61–59
121	August 18	Dodgers	10–3	**Demery** (4–4)	Zahn	—	33,225	62–59
122	August 19	Giants	3–5	Bryant	**Rooker** (8–10)	Sosa	14,077	62–60
123	August 20	Giants	7–8 (10)	Caldwell	**Morlan** (0–3)	—	15,944	62–61
124	August 21	Giants	4–2	**Ellis** (10–8)	Halicki	—	19,814	63–61
125	August 23	@ Padres	6–2	**Reuss** (14–9)	Greif	—	13,443	64–61
126	August 25	@ Padres	4–1 (12)	**Rooker** (9–10)	Palmer	—		65–61
127	August 25	@ Padres	10–2	**Demery** (5–4)	Freisleben	—	11,567	66–61
128	August 27	@ Giants	13–2	**Ellis** (11–8)	D'Acquisto	—	3,273	67–61
129	August 28	@ Giants	3–1 (11)	**Giusti** (6–4)	Barr	—	3,679	68–61
130	August 29	@ Giants	2–3 (11)	Moffitt	**Giusti** (6–5)	—	3,172	68–62
131	August 30	@ Dodgers	4–3	**Rooker** (10–10)	Marshall	**Giusti** (9)	38,887	69–62
132	August 31	@ Dodgers	4–3	**Demery** (6–4)	Zahn	**Giusti** (10)	41,653	70–62

September: 16–12 (Home: 10–3; Away: 5–9)

#	Date	Opponent	Score	Win	Loss	Save	Attendance	Record
133	September 1	@ Dodgers	2–6	Sutton	**Ellis** (11–9)	—	29,667	70–63
134	September 2	Phillies	7–4	**Reuss** (15–9)	Carlton	—		71–63
135	September 2	Phillies	11–1	**Kison** (7–7)	Schueler	—	45,181	72–63
136	September 3	Phillies	8–2	**Rooker** (11–10)	Twitchell	—	8,168	73–63
137	September 6	Expos	2–1	**Ellis** (12–9)	Renko	—	15,386	74–63
138	September 7	Expos	6–5 (12)	**Hernández** (2–1)	Murray	—	17,576	75–63
139	September 8	Expos	8–2	**Rooker** (12–10)	Rogers	—	18,870	76–63
140	September 9	@ Cubs	4–9	Stone	**Demery** (6–5)	LaRoche	2,918	76–64
141	September 10	@ Cubs	12–4	**Brett** (13–7)	Reuschel	—	4,843	77–64
142	September 11	@ Phillies	5–8	Schueler	**Hernández** (2–2)	—	21,117	77–65
143	September 12	@ Phillies	4–6	Garber	**Kison** (7–8)	—	22,135	77–66
144	September 13	@ Expos	2–3	Rogers	**Rooker** (12–11)	—	9,283	77–67
145	September 14	@ Expos	2–17	Blair	**Demery** (6–6)	—	15,566	77–68
146	September 15	@ Expos	4–5	Renko	**Brett** (13–8)	Murray	15,438	77–69
147	September 17	Cardinals	1–2 (13)	Hrabosky	**Reuss** (15–10)	—	21,458	77–70
148	September 18	Cardinals	4–1	**Rooker** (13–11)	McGlothen	—	18,126	78–70
149	September 19	Cardinals	8–6	**Hernández** (3–2)	Folkers	**Giusti** (11)	19,844	79–70
150	September 20	Mets	4–3	**Hernández** (4–2)	McGraw	—	11,683	80–70
151	September 21	Mets	2–4	Koosman	**Pizarro** (0–1)	—	7,160	80–71
152	September 22	Mets	0–4	Matlack	**Reuss** (15–11)	—	27,915	80–72
153	September 23	@ Cardinals	1–0 (10)	**Rooker** (14–11)	McGlothen	**Giusti** (12)	33,525	81–72
154	September 24	@ Cardinals	7–3	**Kison** (8–8)	Curtis	—	37,197	82–72
155	September 25	@ Cardinals	12–13 (11)	Garman	**Minshall** (0–1)	—	41,345	82–73
156	September 26	@ Mets	11–5	**Pizarro** (1–1)	Koosman	—	9,250	83–73
157	September 27	@ Mets	2–1	**Reuss** (16–11)	Matlack	—	17,440	84–73
158	September 28	@ Mets	7–3	**Rooker** (15–11)	McGraw	**Hernández** (2)	13,059	85–73
159	September 29	@ Mets	2–7	Apodaca	**Brett** (13–9)	—	50,653	85–74
160	September 30	Cubs	2–1	**Kison** (9–8)	Bonham	—	10,482	86–74

October: 2–0 (Home: 2–0; Away: 0–0)

#	Date	Opponent	Score	Win	Loss	Save	Attendance	Record
161	October 1	Cubs	6–5	**Giusti** (7–5)	LaRoche	—	13,801	87–74
162	October 2	Cubs	5–4 (10)	**Hernández** (5–2)	Frailing	—	22,725	88–74

Legend: = Win = Loss
Bold = Pirates team member

=== Opening Day lineup ===
Opening Day Starters
#	Name	Position
6	Rennie Stennett	2B
3	Richie Hebner	3B
16	Al Oliver	CF
8	Willie Stargell	LF
22	Richie Zisk	RF
39	Dave Parker	1B
35	Manny Sanguillén	C
11	Dal Maxvill	SS
41	Jerry Reuss	SP

=== Notable transactions ===
- April 20, 1974: Dal Maxvill was released by the Pirates.
- June 5, 1974: 1974 Major League Baseball draft
  - Rod Scurry was drafted by the Pirates in the 1st round of the 1974 Major League Baseball draft.
  - Ed Whitson was drafted by the Pirates in the 6th round of the 1974 Major League Baseball draft.
  - Mike Edwards was drafted by the Pirates in the 7th round of the 1974 Major League Baseball draft.
- July 8, 1974: Kurt Bevacqua was traded by the Pirates to the Kansas City Royals for Cal Meier (minors).
- July 11, 1974: Chuck Brinkman was purchased by the Pirates from the Chicago White Sox.
- August 20, 1974: Juan Pizarro was signed by the Pirates.

=== Roster ===
1974 Pittsburgh Pirates
**Roster**
**Pitchers**: 28 Steve Blass; 30 Ken Brett; 44 Larry Demery; 17 Dock Ellis; 31 Dave Giusti; 36 Ramón Hernández; 56 Juan Jiménez; 25 Bruce Kison; 46 Jim Minshall; 38 Bob Moose; 12 John Morlan; 32 Daryl Patterson; 49 Juan Pizarro; 41 Jerry Reuss; 19 Jim Rooker; 32 Jim Sadowski; 50 Kent Tekulve	**Catchers**: 45 Chuck Brinkman; 34 Ken Macha; 5 Mike Ryan; 35 Manny Sanguillén; **Infielders**: 14 Kurt Bevacqua; 3 Richie Hebner; 14 Art Howe; 23 Ed Kirkpatrick; 11 Dal Maxvill; 11 Mario Mendoza; 24 Paul Popovich; 7 Bob Robertson; 6 Rennie Stennett; 10 Frank Taveras	**Outfielders**: 27 Dave Augustine; 15 Gene Clines; 37 Miguel Diloné; 16 Al Oliver; 27 Ed Ott; 39 Dave Parker; 8 Willie Stargell; 22 Richie Zisk	**Manager**: 40 Danny Murtaugh; **Coaches**: 43 Don Leppert; 42 Don Osborn; 2 José Pagán; 4 Bob Skinner

== Player stats ==
= Indicates team leader

= Indicates league leader

=== Batting ===
==== Starters by position ====
Note: Pos = Position; G = Games played; AB = At bats; H = Hits; Avg. = Batting average; HR = Home runs; RBI = Runs batted in

Pos	Player	G	AB	H	Avg.	HR	RBI
C	Manny Sanguillén	151	596	171	.287	7	68
1B	Bob Robertson	91	236	54	.229	16	48
2B	Rennie Stennett	157	673	196	.291	7	56
SS	Frank Taveras	126	333	82	.246	0	26
3B	Richie Hebner	146	550	160	.291	18	68
LF	Willie Stargell	140	508	153	.301	25	96
CF	Al Oliver	147	617	198	.321	11	85
RF	Richie Zisk	149	536	168	.313	17	100

==== Other batters ====
Note: G = Games played; AB = At bats; H = Hits; Avg. = Batting average; HR = Home runs; RBI = Runs batted in

Player	G	AB	H	Avg.	HR	RBI
Gene Clines	107	276	62	.225	0	14
Ed Kirkpatrick	116	271	67	.247	6	38
Dave Parker	73	220	62	.282	4	29
Mario Mendoza	91	163	36	.221	0	15
Paul Popovich	59	83	18	.217	0	5
Art Howe	29	74	18	.243	1	5
Mike Ryan	15	30	3	.100	0	0
Dal Maxvill	8	22	4	.182	0	0
Dave Augustine	18	22	4	.182	0	0
Chuck Brinkman	4	7	1	.143	0	1
Ken Macha	5	5	3	.600	0	1
Ed Ott	7	5	0	.000	0	0
Miguel Diloné	12	2	0	.000	0	0

=== Pitching ===
==== Starting pitchers ====
Note: G = Games pitched; IP = Innings pitched; W = Wins; L = Losses; ERA = Earned run average; SO = Strikeouts

Player	G	IP	W	L	ERA	SO
Jim Rooker	33	262.2	15	11	2.78	139
Jerry Reuss	35	260.0	16	11	3.50	105
Ken Brett	27	191.0	13	19	3.90	96
Dock Ellis	26	176.2	12	9	3.16	91
Larry Demery	19	95.1	6	6	4.25	51
Bob Moose	7	35.2	1	5	7.57	15

==== Other pitchers ====
Note: G = Games pitched; IP = Innings pitched; W = Wins; L = Losses; ERA = Earned run average; SO = Strikeouts

Player	G	IP	W	L	ERA	SO
Bruce Kison	40	129.0	9	8	3.49	71
Juan Pizarro	7	24.0	1	1	1.88	7

==== Relief pitchers ====
Note: G = Games pitched; W = Wins; L = Losses; SV = Saves; ERA = Earned run average; SO = Strikeouts

Player	G	W	L	SV	ERA	SO
Dave Giusti	64	7	5	12	3.32	53
Ramón Hernández	58	5	2	2	2.75	33
John Morlan	39	0	3	0	4.29	38
Daryl Patterson	14	2	1	1	7.29	8
Kent Tekulve	8	1	1	0	6.00	6
Jim Minshall	5	0	1	0	0.00	3
Juan Jiménez	4	0	0	0	6.75	2
Jim Sadowski	4	0	1	0	6.00	1
Steve Blass	1	0	0	0	9.00	2

== Awards and honors ==
- Willie Stargell, Roberto Clemente Award
- Willie Stargell, Lou Gehrig Award

1974 Major League Baseball All-Star Game

- Ken Brett, Pitcher, Reserve

== Farm system ==
Level	Team	League	Manager
AAA	Charleston Charlies	International League	Steve Demeter
AA	Thetford Mines Pirates	Eastern League	Tim Murtaugh
A	Salem Pirates	Carolina League	Johnny Lipon
A	Charleston Pirates	Western Carolinas League	Larry Sherry
A-Short Season	Niagara Falls Pirates	New York–Penn League	Ron Brand
Rookie	GCL Pirates	Gulf Coast League	Woody Huyke

LEAGUE CHAMPIONS: Thetford Mines, Salem
