= Ron Schueler =

American baseball player (born 1948)

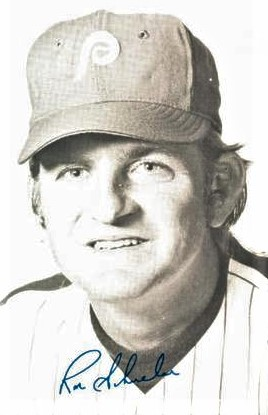
- Pitcher
- Born: April 18, 1948 (age 78); Catharine, Kansas, U.S.
- Batted: Right Threw: Right

MLB debut
- April 16, 1972, for the Atlanta Braves

Last MLB appearance
- July 4, 1979, for the Chicago White Sox

MLB statistics
- Win–loss record: 40–48
- Earned run average: 4.08
- Strikeouts: 563
- Stats at Baseball Reference

Teams
- Atlanta Braves (1972–1973); Philadelphia Phillies (1974–1976); Minnesota Twins (1977); Chicago White Sox (1978–1979)

Ronald Richard Schueler (born April 18, 1948) is an American former professional baseball pitcher, pitching coach, executive and scout. Over the course of his eight-year playing career in Major League Baseball (MLB), Schueler played for the Atlanta Braves, Philadelphia Phillies, Minnesota Twins and Chicago White Sox.

Schueler then spent nearly four decades as a pitching coach, scout, and front office executive. From 1991 to 2000, he served as general manager of the White Sox, with his teams compiling regular season win–loss totals of 817–729, while winning two division championships; they had a 2–7 record in their two postseason appearances.

== Early life and career ==
Born in Catharine in Ellis County, Kansas, Schueler graduated from Hays High School, where he played baseball and basketball, then went on to attend Fort Hays State University.

A right-handed pitcher listed as 6 feet 4 inches (1.93 m) tall and 205 pounds (93 kg), he was first drafted by the Pittsburgh Pirates (but did not sign), in the 1966; he was then selected by the Braves (and signed) following the 1967 lottery. On September 7, 1970, at 22 years old, Schueler tossed a no-hitter for Double-A Shreveport.

== Major leagues ==
Schueler was called up at the start of the 1972 season at twenty-three years old. On April 16, 1972, two days before his twenty-fourth birthday, Schueler made his major league debut as a reliever in a game against the San Diego Padres at San Diego Stadium. He pitched two innings and only gave up one hit in that game, but despite his efforts, the Braves lost. Schueler went on to start thirty-eight games over two years with the Braves.

Schueler was dealt from the Braves to the Phillies for Craig Robinson and Barry Lersch at the Winter Meetings on December 3, 1973. After a mediocre season as a starter, the Phillies converted Schueler to a relief pitcher. He pitched two more seasons in Philadelphia as a reliever and spot starter, and developed a reputation as being dour during interviews.

Just days before the 1977 season began, the Minnesota Twins purchased Schueler from the Phillies. With the Twins, he pitched as a reliever and spot starter, as he did in Philadelphia. Schueler's stay with the Twins lasted only one season, as he became a free agent after the 1977 season. A month after becoming a free agent, Schueler was signed by the Chicago White Sox to be a reliever and spot starter. He played the 1978 season and the first half of 1979 with the White Sox.

Over the course of his MLB career, he posted a won–lost mark of 40–48 and an earned run average of 4.08. In 291 career games pitched, including 86 as a starting pitcher, he threw 13 complete games and two shutouts, with 11 saves out of the bullpen. He allowed 861 hits and 393 bases on balls, with 563 strikeouts, in 9121/3 innings pitched.

== Pitching coach ==
Schueler ended his active career at age 31 to become pitching coach of the White Sox in the middle of the 1979 season, after the illness and death of veteran instructor Fred Martin. He remained with the ChiSox through the 1981 season.

In 1982, Schueler was hired by the Oakland Athletics to be their pitching coach. Schueler worked for three seasons in Oakland. Schueler joined the Pittsburgh Pirates in 1986 after a year out of the majors.

== Front office ==
He only stayed with the Pirates for a year before returning to Oakland, this time in the front office as a special assistant to general manager Sandy Alderson. Schueler worked in the Athletics' front office for four seasons, including the 1989 season in which the Athletics won the World Series.

In 1991, Schueler returned to the White Sox as their general manager. As the general manager, Schueler was responsible for acquiring veterans such as Ellis Burks, Tim Raines, Bo Jackson, Julio Franco and José Valentín. The White Sox won the American League West title in 1993 and had the circuit's best record at 67–46 before a players' strike prematurely ended the 1994 season. Schueler gradually dismantled the ballclub after the work stoppage ended, beginning with the departures of Franco, Jack McDowell and Joey Cora and the dismissal of manager Gene Lamont 31 games into the 1995 campaign. The White Flag Trade was his most controversial transaction with the team. He was their general manager for ten years, stepping down on October 24, 2000 to become senior vice president of the franchise, a scout, a special consultant to chairman Jerry Reinsdorf, and an adviser to general manager Ken Williams. He worked in this new position through the 2002 season.

Before the 2003 season, he was hired by the Chicago Cubs as a special assistant to the president and general manager. Two years later, the St. Louis Cardinals hired Schueler to be the special assistant to the general manager. He was part of the 2006 Cardinals organization that won the World Series. In 2008, the San Francisco Giants hired Schueler to be a scout and evaluate major and minor league players and acquisitions. In November 2009, The Washington Nationals hired Schueler as special adviser to GM Mike Rizzo. Then, in 2014, he joined the Baltimore Orioles as a professional scout, serving through the 2018 campaign.

== Personal life ==
Schueler is married to Linda, and has two stepchildren, Jennifer and Christina. They live in Paradise Valley, Arizona. Schueler has two children from a previous marriage, Kacey and Carey. Carey was the first woman to be drafted by a Major League Baseball team when the White Sox picked her in the 43rd round (1208th pick overall) in 1993. Prior to Schueler's drafting, the MLB had a ban in place on signing contracts for women.

Sporting positions
Preceded by Fred Martin	Chicago White Sox pitching coach 1979–1982	Succeeded by Ken Silvestri
Preceded by Art Fowler	Oakland Athletics pitching coach 1983–1984	Succeeded by Wes Stock
Preceded by Grant Jackson	Pittsburgh Pirates pitching coach 1986	Succeeded by Ray Miller
Preceded by Larry Himes	Chicago White Sox general manager 1991–2000	Succeeded by Kenny Williams
