= Jim Howarth =

American baseball player (born 1947)

- Outfielder
- Born: March 7, 1947 (age 79); Biloxi, Mississippi, U.S.
- Batted: Left Threw: Left

MLB debut
- September 5, 1971, for the San Francisco Giants

Last MLB appearance
- May 19, 1974, for the San Francisco Giants

MLB statistics
- Batting average: .217
- Home runs: 1
- Runs batted in: 16
- Stats at Baseball Reference

Teams
- San Francisco Giants (1971–1974)

James Eugene Howarth (born March 7, 1947) is an American former professional baseball outfielder who appeared in 152 games played in the Major Leagues over all or part of four seasons, from 1971 to 1974, for the San Francisco Giants. He threw and batted left-handed, and was listed as 5 feet 11 inches (1.80 m) tall and 175 pounds (79 kg).

Howarth was born in Biloxi, Mississippi, where he graduated from high school. He attended Mississippi State University, and was selected All-SEC as a center fielder in his junior year in 1968. That June 7, he was selected by the Giants in the eighth round of the 1968 amateur draft and entered their farm system. After his fourth season in the organization, in 1971, when he batted a lofty .363 in 110 games for Triple-A Phoenix, he was rewarded with a post-September 1 call-up to San Francisco. Howarth recorded three hits and three bases on balls in seven games and 17 plate appearances that month. Then he spent two full years, 1972 and 1973, on the Giants' MLB roster.

In 1972, he was part of a crowded outfield corps that featured Baseball Hall of Famer Willie Mays, in his last campaign as a Giant, in center field—along with multiple All-Star selection and Gold Glove Award recipient Bobby Bonds, future All-Stars Dave Kingman and Gary Matthews, rookie and future eight-time Gold Glove winner Garry Maddox, and veteran Ken Henderson. Howarth appeared in 74 games, with 25 starts in the outfield, and batted .235 in 136 plate appearances. His highlights including leading the National League in pinch hitting, with 13 hits in 39 bats, and his only MLB home run, a two-run blow off left-hander Claude Osteen on June 30 that helped propel the Giants to an 8–4 win at Candlestick Park against their bitter rivals, the Los Angeles Dodgers. The following year, his playing time diminished somewhat: he was given only 98 plate appearances, and his batting mark fell to .200.

When he began 1974 with no hits in four at bats as a pinch hitter and defensive replacement, San Francisco sent him back to Phoenix for more playing time. But, later that year, Howarth sustained a knee injury and concussion in a home-plate collision, and decided to leave professional baseball. In his 152 big-league games, Howarth collected 49 hits, with six doubles, one triple, and his lone home run. He had 16 runs batted in.

Howarth returned to Biloxi, where he spent 41 years in banking before his 2016 retirement.
