= Danny Godby =

American baseball player (born 1946)

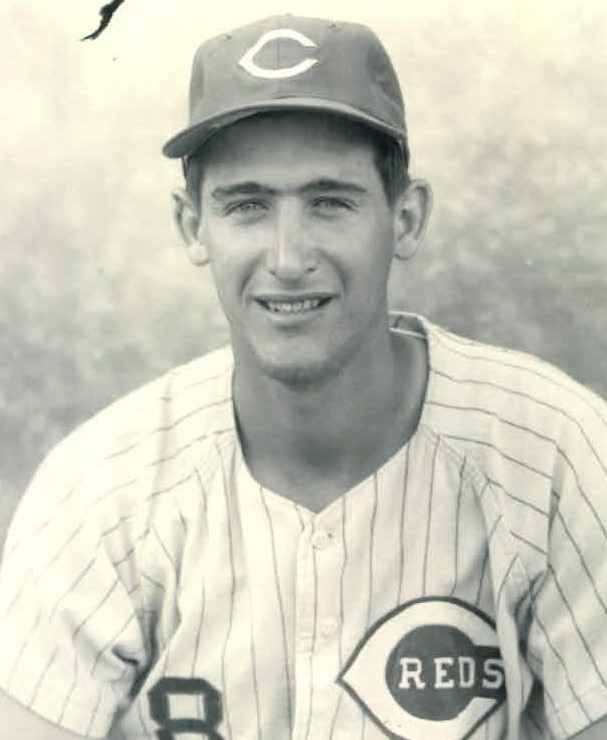
- Pinch hitter / Outfielder
- Born: November 4, 1946 (age 79); Logan, West Virginia, U.S.
- Batted: Right Threw: Right

MLB debut
- August 10, 1974, for the St. Louis Cardinals

Last MLB appearance
- September 25, 1974, for the St. Louis Cardinals

MLB statistics
- Batting average: .154
- Hits: 2
- Runs batted in: 1
- Stats at Baseball Reference

Teams
- St. Louis Cardinals (1974)

Danny Ray Godby (born November 4, 1946) is an American former professional baseball player who appeared in 13 games played for the St. Louis Cardinals of Major League Baseball during the 1974 season. An outfielder who threw and batted right-handed, Godby stood 6 feet (1.8 m) tall and weighed 185 pounds (84 kg).

Godby was born in Logan, West Virginia. He attended Bowling Green University, and from 1965 to 1967 he played collegiate summer baseball with the Chatham A's of the Cape Cod Baseball League. He was signed as an undrafted free agent in 1968 by the Cincinnati Reds, then traded to the Cardinals in 1971.

Godby was in his seventh professional season when he was recalled by the Cardinals in August 1974 after he batted .344 in 100 games for the Triple-A Tulsa Oilers and was selected to the American Association all-star team. Godby made his MLB debut on August 10 when he was announced as a pinch hitter for Bob Forsch against left-hander Doug Rau of the Los Angeles Dodgers. However, when Rau was relieved by righty relief pitcher Mike Marshall, Godby was himself replaced by a left-handed pinch hitter, Tim McCarver. Two days later, against the San Diego Padres, Godby pinch hit for Al Hrabosky in the home half of the 13th inning and singled off Bill Laxton for his first MLB hit in his first official at bat. Godby made his way to third base on a sacrifice bunt and another single, then scored the winning run on a sacrifice fly by Bake McBride.

The hit off Laxton was one of two Godby would collect in 13 at-bats and 17 plate appearances (along with three bases on balls and one sacrifice fly) with the Cardinals. The other, also a single, came a month later off the New York Mets' Jon Matlack. He scored two runs, with one run batted in. When his Redbird trial ended after the 1974 season, Godby played three more seasons of minor league baseball before concluding his professional career in 1977 after ten seasons. He collected 898 hits in 958 minor league games, batting .282.

After his pro baseball days were over, Godby has worked as a physical education teacher at his high school alma mater, Chapmanville High School, and later at the new Chapmanville Regional High School in West Virginia.
