= Ramón de los Santos =

Dominican baseball player (1949-2015)

- Pitcher
- Born: January 19, 1949; Santo Domingo, Dominican Republic
- Died: November 29, 2015 (aged 66); Santo Domingo, Dominican Republic
- Batted: Left Threw: Left

MLB debut
- August 21, 1974, for the Houston Astros

Last MLB appearance
- October 2, 1974, for the Houston Astros

MLB statistics
- Win–loss record: 1–1
- Earned run average: 2.19
- Strikeouts: 7
- Stats at Baseball Reference

Teams
- Houston Astros (1974)
Medals
Men's baseball
Representing Dominican Republic
Central American and Caribbean Games
Silver medal – second place	1970 Panama City	Team

Ramón de los Santos Genero (January 19, 1949 – November 29, 2015) was a Dominican Major League Baseball relief pitcher and scout. The left-hander signed as a free agent with the Houston Astros on April 9, 1972, and played for them in 1974.

De los Santos was called up to Houston in August 1974 after a season dominating hitters in the Double-A Southern League. Pitching in 42 games for the Columbus Astros, he struck out 73 batters in 76 innings and allowed only 11 earned runs. He was 7–4 with an ERA of 1.30.

On August 21, 1974, de los Santos made his major league debut in relief against the New York Mets at the Astrodome. He retired the first batter he faced, right fielder Rusty Staub, then struck out first baseman John Milner to end the 6th inning. In 2.2 innings that night he gave up two hits, three walks, and two unearned runs, and the Astros lost, 10–2. They had made five errors during the game.

De los Santos won his first and only big-league game one week later at Shea Stadium. He retired Mets shortstop Bud Harrelson, the last hitter in the bottom of the 9th, and then-teammate Cliff Johnson hit a home run in the top of the 10th to win the game, 3–2.

Season and career totals for 12 games include a 1–1 record and 5 games finished. In 121/3 innings pitched he gave up three earned runs for an earned run average of 2.19. He struck out seven, walked nine and allowed 11 hits.

In 1975 de los Santos pitched in both Triple-A and Double-A and was drafted by the St. Louis Cardinals organization after the season (December 9), but never again appeared in a major league game.

His professional playing career encompassed 15 seasons (1971–85) in U.S. professional baseball and Latin America. He later became a scout in the Dominican Republic for the Seattle Mariners and in 1992 he signed David Ortiz, then known as David Arias, to his first professional contract.
