= Ron Bryant =

American baseball player (1947–2023)

- Pitcher
- Born: November 12, 1947; Redlands, California, U.S.
- Died: November 17, 2023 (aged 76); Boise, Idaho, U.S.
- Batted: Switch Threw: Left

MLB debut
- September 29, 1967, for the San Francisco Giants

Last MLB appearance
- July 29, 1975, for the St. Louis Cardinals

MLB statistics
- Win–loss record: 57–56
- Earned run average: 4.02
- Strikeouts: 509
- Stats at Baseball Reference

Teams
- San Francisco Giants (1967–1974); St. Louis Cardinals (1975)

Career highlights and awards
- NL wins leader (1973)

Ronald Raymond Bryant (November 12, 1947 – November 17, 2023) was an American Major League Baseball pitcher from 1967 to 1975. Bryant's career record was 57 wins and 56 losses with a 4.02 earned run average (ERA), mostly with the San Francisco Giants. He had 519 strikeouts in 917 career innings pitched. In 1972, he went 14–7 with a 2.90 ERA. The following year he won 24 games, leading the National League.

His nickname is Bear which was coined by longtime Giants equipment manager Mike Murphy who explained that "Ron looked like a bear with his chunky build, his way of walking and his curly hair" and had nothing to do with Paul Bryant. He kept in his locker and the Giants dugout a three-foot teddy bear which was bought from a girl who was a Cubs fan for $30 in Chicago in 1972 and attired in one of his jerseys. He also had a superstition of carrying in his back pocket the same amount of bubble gum pieces as the win total he was striving to achieve during his starts.

In 1973, Bryant had a 24–12 record with a 3.53 ERA for San Francisco. His 24 wins tied him with Wilbur Wood for most victories that year and made him the National League's only 20-game winner. It was also the most by a Giants left-handed pitcher since Carl Hubbell's 26 in 1936. Despite his achievement, he finished third in that year's National League Cy Young Award balloting behind Tom Seaver and Mike Marshall. No subsequent Giants pitcher would win at least 20 games in a season until Mike Krukow went 20–9 in 1986.

Bryant sustained a gash along the right side of his torso that required 25 surgical sutures when he tumbled off a body slide and hit the side of a hotel swimming pool before going into the water during spring training on March 15, 1974. After a stint on the injured list until April 16, he went 3–15 with a 5.61 ERA in 1974. His request to be placed on the voluntary retired list was granted by the Giants on April 4, 1975. The primary reason he stated for his decision was a desire to spend more time with his wife and their two children.

His contract was dealt by the Giants to the St. Louis Cardinals in exchange for Larry Herndon and minor league pitcher Tony Gonzales on May 9, 1975. Bryant ended his brief retirement once the mandatory 60-day stay on the voluntary list expired on June 6. His major league pitching career ended when he was released by the Cardinals on July 30, 1975 after rejecting a demotion to the Tulsa Oilers. After being cut by the Los Angeles Dodgers during spring training on March 30, 1976, he stayed in the organization with the Albuquerque Dukes where he had a 6.89 ERA in 49 2/3 innings in 13 games before his release 3 1/2 months later on July 13.

== Personal life and death ==
Bryant was married to Jodi Hughes. He died in Boise, Idaho on November 17, 2023, five days after his 76th birthday.

== See also ==
- List of Major League Baseball annual wins leaders
