= Bruce Miller (baseball) =

American baseball player (born 1947)

- Infielder
- Born: March 4, 1947 (age 79); Fort Wayne, Indiana, U.S.
- Batted: Right Threw: Right

MLB debut
- August 4, 1973, for the San Francisco Giants

Last MLB appearance
- August 28, 1976, for the San Francisco Giants

MLB statistics
- Batting average: .246
- Home runs: 1
- Runs batted in: 51
- Stats at Baseball Reference

Teams
- San Francisco Giants (1973–1976)

Charles Bruce Miller (born March 4, 1947) is an American former Major League Baseball utility infielder. He played for the San Francisco Giants from 1973 to 1976. Miller was drafted by the Chicago White Sox in the 20th round of the 1970 MLB June Amateur Draft from Indiana University. Miller led the Hoosiers in hits in both 1968 and 1969, earning all Big Ten honors at shortstop in 1969. He advanced through the White Sox farm system, hitting .289 for the 1972 Triple-A Tucson Toros, and was traded to the California Angels along with Bruce Kimm for veteran pitcher Eddie Fisher in August 1972.

In 1973, his stay with the Angels was brief as they traded him that April for Al Gallagher. Miller then spent most of the year with the Phoenix Giants, making the 1973 Pacific Coast League All-Star team, and was rewarded with a late-season call-up by the Giants in August 1973, batting .143. He split duty in 1974 between the Triple-A Phoenix Giants and the San Francisco Giants, hitting .278 in 215 plate appearances in the big leagues. Miller went 4–4 against the St. Louis Cardinals in a June 6, 1974 game and had a 3 RBI game against the Houston Astros in September.

Miller spent all of 1975 with the Giants, with a .239 average in 328 at-bats in an infield utility role. He hit his first and only major-league home run off Clay Kirby of the Cincinnati Reds in Cincinnati in a July 31, 1975 game. Miller also went 2–4 with 4 RBIs in an August home match-up with the Montreal Expos and had 5 game-winning hits in 1975.

1976 was again a split season, with most of the year spent with the Giants Triple-A affiliate in Phoenix. Miller did get called up to San Francisco during the summer for a 12-game stretch, hitting .160 in his final taste of major-league action. His final game in MLB was August 28, 1976. Miller was with the 4th-place Giants on September 19, 1976, when, on a flight returning from a series in Cincinnati, he got into a drunken altercation with the team statistician, Ralph Nelson, and traveling secretary, Frank Bergonzi. Miller and teammate Mike Caldwell demanded another drink from the flight attendant, Bergonzi intervened, and Miller punched Nelson in the in-flight altercation. Miller was sent to the minors by the Giants as a result, his contract out-righted to Phoenix and then released by the organization. Giants Manager Bill Rigney resigned at the end of the season, and Caldwell was traded to the St. Louis Cardinals in October. The Giants banned alcohol on team flights the following season.

Miler played professional softball with the Fort Wayne Huggie Bears of the United Professional Softball League during their 1980 season. The team played at the Tah-Cum-Wah Recreation Center in Fort Wayne.

Miller went on to become a teacher on the North Side High School, and served as a baseball coach and was a 2012 Indiana Baseball Hall of Fame inductee.
