= Charlie Williams (pitcher) =

American baseball player (1947–2015)

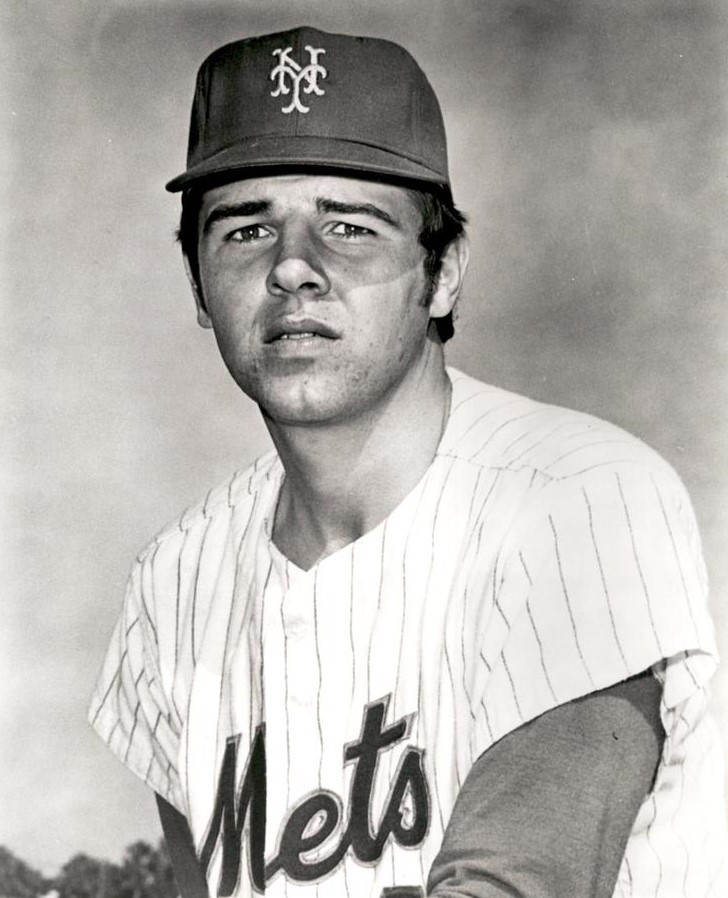
- Pitcher
- Born: October 11, 1947; Flushing, New York, U.S.
- Died: January 27, 2015 (aged 67); Daytona Beach, Florida, U.S.
- Batted: Right Threw: Right

MLB debut
- April 23, 1971, for the New York Mets

Last MLB appearance
- September 11, 1978, for the San Francisco Giants

MLB statistics
- Win–loss record: 23–22
- Earned run average: 3.97
- Strikeouts: 257
- Stats at Baseball Reference

Teams
- New York Mets (1971); San Francisco Giants (1972–1978)

Charles Prosek Williams (October 11, 1947 – January 27, 2015) was a Major League Baseball pitcher, best known for being the player the New York Mets traded to the San Francisco Giants for Willie Mays in 1972.

== New York Mets ==
Williams was selected by the Mets in the seventh round of the 1968 Major League Baseball draft after having played college baseball at Parsons College. After going 21–15 in the minors, he made the Major League club out of Spring training in 1971. On April 23, he made his major league debut at Wrigley Field in Chicago, pitching 2.2 innings and giving up four runs (two earned) in the Mets' 7–6 extra innings victory over the Cubs (the winning pitcher of the game was future Hall of Famer Nolan Ryan). For the season, Williams compiled a 5–6 record, making nine starts, with a 4.78 earned run average and 53 strikeouts.

== San Francisco Giants ==
Williams began the 1972 season with the Mets' Triple-A affiliate, the Tidewater Tides, when he was traded on May 11 to the San Francisco Giants with $50,000 for Willie Mays. Williams appeared in only three games for the Giants that season, spending most of it with their Triple-A affiliate, the Phoenix Giants (10–10, 4.60 ERA).

After splitting the 1973 season between Phoenix and San Francisco, he made the Giants for good in 1974. His final game was on September 11, 1978, against the Los Angeles Dodgers at Candlestick Park.

== After baseball ==
Following the conclusion of his baseball career, Williams was briefly a New York City taxi driver. He later settled in Port Orange, Florida and died in Daytona Beach on January 27, 2015, from complications resulting from heart surgery.
