= Jesús Hernáiz =

Puerto Rican baseball player (born 1945)

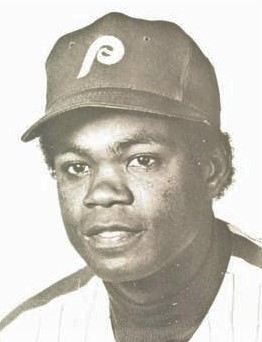
- Pitcher
- Born: January 8, 1945 (age 81); Santurce, Puerto Rico
- Batted: Right Threw: Right

MLB debut
- June 14, 1974, for the Philadelphia Phillies

Last MLB appearance
- September 13, 1974, for the Philadelphia Phillies

MLB statistics
- Win–loss record: 2–3
- Earned run average: 5.88
- Strikeouts: 16
- Stats at Baseball Reference

Teams
- Philadelphia Phillies (1974)

Jesús Rafael Hernáiz Rodríguez (born January 8, 1945) is a Puerto Rican former Major League Baseball (MLB) pitcher. He played during one season at the major league level for the Philadelphia Phillies. He was signed by the Chicago Cubs as an amateur free agent prior to the 1967 season. Hernáiz played his last professional season with the New York Yankees' Double-A Nashville Sounds and Triple-A Columbus Clippers in 1983.

== See also ==
- List of Major League Baseball players from Puerto Rico
