= Tom Heintzelman =

American baseball player (born 1946)

- Infielder
- Born: November 3, 1946 (age 79); St. Charles, Missouri, U.S.
- Batted: Right Threw: Right

MLB debut
- August 12, 1973, for the St. Louis Cardinals

Last MLB appearance
- October 1, 1978, for the San Francisco Giants

MLB statistics
- Batting average: .243
- Home runs: 3
- Runs batted in: 12
- Stats at Baseball Reference

Teams
- St. Louis Cardinals (1973–1974); San Francisco Giants (1977–1978)

Thomas Kenneth Heintzelman (born November 3, 1946) is an American former professional baseball player. An infielder, he played in 90 Major League games over parts of four seasons with the St. Louis Cardinals and San Francisco Giants. He threw and batted right-handed, stood 6 feet 1 inch (1.85 m) tall and weighed 180 pounds (82 kg).

Heintzelman was drafted by the Cardinals in the seventh round of the 1968 Major League Baseball draft and made his major league debut during the 1973 season. Following the 1974 baseball season, he was traded to the Giants for Jim Willoughby.

Heintzelman's father, Ken Heintzelman, had a 13-season MLB career as a pitcher.

Tom Heintzelman served during the Vietnam War, making him one of fifty-four former Major League baseball players who are also veterans of the Vietnam War. He was in the Army from March 27, 1969 through December 23, 1970.

Tom has three children and currently resides in Phoenix, Arizona. His children are Jennifer Doroty, Lora Heintzelman, and Brian Heintzelman.

== See also ==
- List of second-generation Major League Baseball players
