= Jim Minshall =

American baseball player (born 1947)

- Pitcher
- Born: July 4, 1947 (age 77); Covington, Kentucky
- Batted: Right Threw: Right

MLB debut
- September 14, 1974, for the Pittsburgh Pirates

Last MLB appearance
- September 11, 1975, for the Pittsburgh Pirates

MLB statistics
- Win–loss record: 0–1
- Earned run average: 0.00
- Strikeouts: 5

Teams
- Pittsburgh Pirates (1974–1975)

James Edward Minshall (born July 4, 1947) is an American former professional baseball pitcher who played in Major League Baseball for the Pittsburgh Pirates in 1974 and 1975. Minshall compiled a career record of 59 wins and 53 losses with 20 saves and a 3.70 earned run average in his 290-game pitching career with the Pittsburgh Pirates, Salem Pirates, Clinton Pilots, Salem Rebels, Sherbrooke Pirates, Thetford Mines Pirates and Charleston Charlies. He began playing during the 1966 season and last took the field during the 1976 campaign. Minshall attended Newport Central Catholic High School in Newport, Kentucky.
