= Ray Bare =

American baseball player (1949–1994)

- Pitcher
- Born: April 15, 1949; Miami, Florida, U.S.
- Died: March 29, 1994 (aged 44); Miami, Florida, U.S.
- Batted: Right Threw: Right

MLB debut
- June 30, 1972, for the St. Louis Cardinals

Last MLB appearance
- May 3, 1977, for the Detroit Tigers

MLB statistics
- Win–loss record: 16–26
- Earned run average: 4.79
- Strikeouts: 145
- Stats at Baseball Reference

Teams
- St. Louis Cardinals (1972, 1974); Detroit Tigers (1975–1977)

Raymond Douglas Bare (April 15, 1949 – March 29, 1994) was an American right-handed professional baseball pitcher. He played all or part of five seasons in Major League Baseball with the St. Louis Cardinals (1972, 1974) and Detroit Tigers (1975–77).

== Amateur career ==
Born in Miami, Florida, Bare was drafted four times before finally signing. In June 1967, he was drafted out of Southwest Miami High School by the Washington Senators in the 14th round of the amateur draft, but did not sign. In January 1968, and again in June 1968, he was drafted by the Cleveland Indians, but did not sign either time. He finally signed with the Cardinals after being drafted in February 1969.

== Professional career ==
=== Early years with St. Louis ===
In 1972, Bare appeared in 14 games as a relief pitcher for the Cardinals, allowing only one earned run for a minuscule 0.54 ERA. Bare spent most of the 1973 and 1974 seasons with the Tulsa Oilers of the American Association. In 1974, Bare went 12–4 for the Oilers with a league-best 2.34 ERA. He was then called up to the Cardinals and had a 1–2 record (5.92 ERA) for the 1974 Cardinals.

=== With the Tigers ===
==== 1975 season ====
On April 4, 1975, Bare was selected off waivers by the Detroit Tigers. Bare was put into the starting rotation for the pitching-starved 1975 Detroit Tigers – a team that lost 102 games. Bare had an 8–13 record and a 4.48 ERA in 150 2/3 innings for the Tigers in 1975. On May 1, Bare got his first decision in a 17–3 loss to the Milwaukee Brewers; Bare gave five earned runs in just two innings, allowing two triples and two doubles (by Hank Aaron and Robin Yount). The following week, Bare got his first win for Detroit, a 6–4 decision against the same Brewers team.

On June 4, pitched a strong game against the Angels, giving up only six hits and two earned runs, but taking the loss as the Tigers scored only once. On June 19, Bare lost, 9–2, to Catfish Hunter and the Yankees, as Bare gave up 13 hits and six earned runs in 6 2/3 innings. Bare took a tough loss on June 29, as he allowed only four hits and two earned runs in 7 2/3 innings, but the Orioles won, 2–1. On August 16, Bare pitched his best game of the season, a two-hit complete game shutout against the Angels, with the Tigers scoring eight runs to back him up. This game also ended a 19-game losing streak for the Tigers.

==== 1976 season ====
Bare returned to the Tigers starting lineup in 1976 with a 7–8 record and 3.70 ERA in 134 innings. On April 18, Bare got a win in his first start of the season, a 6–2 decision over the Angels. In his next start, Bare gave up six runs in 6 2/3 innings on April 23, then was crushed by the White Sox, 8–4, on April 30, giving up five earned runs in four innings. Then, after two poor starts, Bare pitched the best game of his career on May 7, a complete game one-hit shutout against the Chicago White Sox. The White Sox only hit off Bare was a single by Ralph Garr in the fourth inning. Continuing his inconsistent pitching, Bare did not make it out of the first inning in his next start, giving up four runs, including a home run by Graig Nettles in 2/3 of an inning. On May 21, Bare failed to make it out of the first inning yet again, giving up three hits, two walks, and six runs (including a Doug DeCinces home run) in 2/3 of an inning against the Orioles. Five days later, Bare held the same Orioles squad to two earned runs and got the win in a 6–2 Tigers victory. Bare had a strong outing against the White Sox on July 22, 1976, as the Tigers won 5–1, and Bare allowed only five hits and one run in 7 1/3 innings.

Bare got his final major league win on September 10, 1976, at Fenway Park. He shut out the Red Sox in a rain-shortened five-inning game, as the Tigers won, 1–0. Ben Oglivie hit a home run to win it for Bare and the Tigers.

==== 1977 season ====
In 1977, Bare's ERA ballooned to 12.56 in 14 1/3 innings. On April 9, in the second game of the Tigers season, Bare gave up five runs in two innings against the Royals, as the Royals went on to beat the Tigers, 16–2. On April 14, Bare pitched well, giving up only one earned run in seven innings, but the Tigers lost the game as John Hiller gave up three runs in relief of Bare. In his third start of the season on April 19, Bare was blasted, allowing five earned runs in only 1 1/3 innings against the Red Sox. Bare got his final Major League start on April 27, allowing six earned runs in four innings against the White Sox.

On May 3, Bare gave up three earned runs pitching in relief against the Rangers without retiring a single batter. With that, the Tigers had enough, and Bare was sent down to the minor leagues, and finished the season with the Triple-A Evansville Triplets.

=== With the Orioles ===
The Tigers let Bare go after the season, and he was signed by the Baltimore Orioles. He pitched for their top farm club, the Rochester Red Wings, in 1978, compiling a record of 7–13 with a 4.05 ERA in what proved to be his last professional season.

== Death ==
Bare died of leukemia at age 44 in Miami, Florida, on March 29, 1994.
