= Mike Cosgrove =

American baseball player (born 1951)

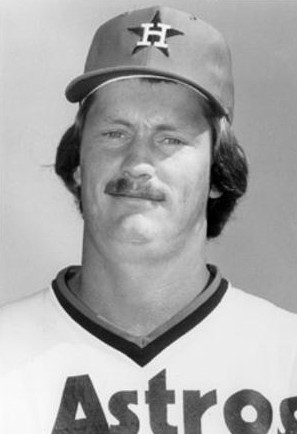
- Cosgrove in 1976
- Pitcher
- Born: February 17, 1951 (age 74); Phoenix, Arizona, U.S.
- Batted: Left Threw: Left

MLB debut
- September 10, 1972, for the Houston Astros

Last MLB appearance
- September 25, 1976, for the Houston Astros

MLB statistics
- Win–loss record: 12–11
- Earned run average: 4.03
- Strikeouts: 122
- Stats at Baseball Reference

Teams
- Houston Astros (1972–1976)

Michael John Cosgrove (born February 17, 1951) is a former Major League Baseball pitcher with the Houston Astros from 1972 to 1976.

== Career ==
Cosgrove graduated high school in 1969 from Bourgade Catholic High School in Phoenix, Arizona and was the 16th round pick (374th overall) of the Cincinnati Reds of the 1969 June Baseball draft. He declined and went to Phoenix College. He was then drafted in the January 1970 secondary Baseball draft in the 2nd round (38th overall) by the Houston Astros and assigned to play for the Cocoa Astros of the Florida State League.

Called up in 1972, Cosgrove was used primarily as a left-handed relief pitcher. His best seasons came in 1974 and 1975. In '74 he was 7–3 with a 3.50 ERA and 2 saves in 90 innings pitched. For '75 Cosgrove went 1–2 with a 3.03 ERA and recorded 5 saves in 71.1 innings pitched.
