= Claude Osteen =

American baseball player (born 1939)

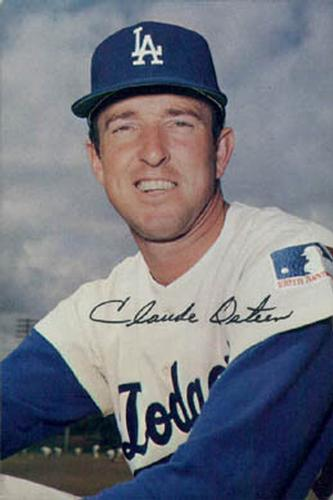
- Pitcher
- Born: August 9, 1939 (age 86); Caney Spring, Tennessee, U.S.
- Batted: Left Threw: Left

MLB debut
- July 6, 1957, for the Cincinnati Redlegs

Last MLB appearance
- September 27, 1975, for the Chicago White Sox

MLB statistics
- Win–loss record: 196–195
- Earned run average: 3.30
- Strikeouts: 1,612
- Stats at Baseball Reference

Teams
- As player: Cincinnati Redlegs / Reds (1957, 1959–1961); Washington Senators (1961–1964); Los Angeles Dodgers (1965–1973); Houston Astros (1974); St. Louis Cardinals (1974); Chicago White Sox (1975); As coach: St. Louis Cardinals (1977–1980); Philadelphia Phillies (1982–1988); Texas Rangers (1993–1994); Los Angeles Dodgers (1999–2000)

Career highlights and awards
- 3× All-Star (1967, 1970, 1973); World Series champion (1965)

Claude Wilson Osteen (born August 9, 1939), nicknamed "Gomer" because of his resemblance to television character Gomer Pyle, is an American former professional baseball left-handed pitcher who played in Major League Baseball (MLB) for the Cincinnati Redlegs/Reds, Washington Senators, Los Angeles Dodgers, Houston Astros, St. Louis Cardinals, and Chicago White Sox.

== Career ==
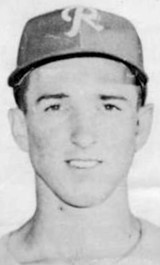
Osteen, circa 1959

=== Early career ===
Osteen signed with the Cincinnati Redlegs in 1957, after completing high school, and joined the major-league team without first playing in Minor League Baseball. While this was the era of "bonus babies"—players that the league required to be carried on a major-league roster, due to having a large signing bonus—Osteen received a bonus below the threshold.

Osteen made his major-league debut on July 6, 1957, and was with the team for parts of four seasons. However, he never really received a season-long chance to start in Cincinnati and was traded on September 16, 1961, to the Washington Senators for pitcher Dave Sisler.

With the Senators, Osteen got a chance to start regularly in the big leagues, albeit with a consistently sub-.500 team. After posting a winning record (15–13) in 1964, he was in much demand that winter. On December 4, 1964, Osteen was traded by the Senators to the Los Angeles Dodgers in a seven-player deal, with five players (two of whom were Frank Howard and Pete Richert) going to the Senators. Osteen developed into one of the game's better starters in Los Angeles.

=== Los Angeles Dodgers ===
After two years with an earned run average (ERA) under 3.00 (1965–1966), Osteen was considered a top-notch starter and a workhorse. In those two years, Osteen and the Dodgers reached two straight World Series (the only two he would reach in his career). In the 1965 World Series, the Dodgers beat the Minnesota Twins in 7 games, with Osteen pitching brilliantly. He had a 0.64 ERA in the Series, with a 1–1 record including a shutout, which came after teammates Don Drysdale and Sandy Koufax had lost their respective games (the first two games of the Series). In the 1966 World Series, the Dodgers were beaten by the Baltimore Orioles in four games. Osteen was charged with the loss, in a 1–0 pitchers' duel with Wally Bunker in Game 3, despite giving up only three hits in seven innings; a home run by Paul Blair accounted for the game's only run. Osteen's final postseason statistics include a 0.86 ERA with seven strikeouts in 21 innings pitched.

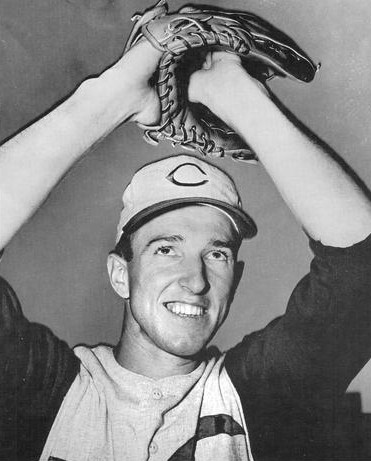
Osteen in 1961

In 1967, Osteen reached his first All-Star game. His season totals included a 17–17 record, a 3.22 ERA and 152 strikeouts in 288 1/3 innings pitched. He hurled 14 complete games, with five shutouts. In 1968, Osteen was one of the game's consistent hard-luck losers; despite a very respectable 3.08 ERA, he only won 12 of 30 decisions. The 12 victories would be his fewest in a season from 1964 to 1973; the 18 losses tied him with Ray Sadecki for the major league lead. In 1969, Osteen won 20 games for the first time and set a number of career highs, including 321 innings pitched, 183 strikeouts, 16 complete games, and 7 shutouts.

In the 1970s, Osteen was still pitching an average of 260 innings a year. In the 1970 All-Star game, Osteen pitched three shutout innings, notching the win, in a game most remembered for the play in which Pete Rose barreled into Ray Fosse to score the winning run in the 12th inning. Coincidentally, like Osteen, the pitcher and hitter involved in the walk-off single were also Tennessee natives: Jim Hickman (who had been a Dodger teammate of Osteen's in 1967) collected the hit off losing pitcher Clyde Wright (coincidentally, Hickman and Wright would become Comeback Players of the Year in their respective leagues).

In 1972, Osteen had a particularly strong year, finishing with 7 complete game victories in his last 9 starts. That year, he was 20–11, with a 2.64 ERA, in 252 innings pitched.

Osteen made his 3rd and final All-Star team in 1973, in what would prove to be his last real quality MLB campaign — and his last season with the Dodgers. That year, while pitching for a 2nd-place Dodger team, Osteen went 16–11 and posted a 3.31 ERA, while logging 33 starts, 12 complete games, and 3 shutouts. He had achieved double-figure wins each year, for 10 consecutive seasons (1964–1973).

=== Later career ===
Osteen was dealt along with minor-league right-handed pitcher David Culpepper from the Dodgers to the Houston Astros for Jimmy Wynn at the Winter Meetings on December 6, 1973. Wynn would later help the Dodgers win the 1974 NL pennant. The Astros traded Osteen to the St. Louis Cardinals in August 1974. On September 11, 1974 he pitched 9 1/3 innings of relief against the New York Mets in a 25 inning game, won by St. Louis 4–3. He did not figure in the decision. In April 1975, he was released by the Cardinals and was signed by the Chicago White Sox, for whom he played his final game on September 27, 1975. His release by the White Sox on April 5, 1976 was among the team's final roster cuts at the end of spring training. Over the course of an 18-year professional career, Osteen compiled 196 wins, 1,612 strikeouts, and a 3.30 ERA.

As a batter, Osteen had a lifetime .188 batting average, with 8 home runs, and 76 runs batted in (RBI). He was used as pinch hitter on a number of occasions. Defensively, he recorded a .971 fielding percentage which was 18 points higher than the league average at his position.

Beginning in 1977, Osteen became a big league pitching coach for the Cardinals, Philadelphia Phillies, Texas Rangers, and Dodgers. He also coached various minor league teams.

== Highlights ==
- 3-time All-Star (1967, 1970, 1973)
- Top 10 in the league in games started, 10 times (1964, 1965, 1966, 1967, 1968, 1969, 1970, 1971, 1972, 1975)
- 2nd in the league in shutouts 3 times (1967, 1969, 1970); top 10 in the league 3 more times (1971, 1972, 1973)
- Top 10 in the league in innings pitched, 6 times (1964, 1965, 1967, 1969, 1970, 1972)
- Top 10 in ERA, 3 times (1965, 1966, 1972)

== See also ==
- List of World Series starting pitchers
- List of Major League Baseball career shutout leaders
- List of baseball players who went directly to Major League Baseball

Awards and achievements
Preceded by Don Rudolph	Washington Senators Opening Day; Starting pitcher 1964	Succeeded by Phil Ortega
Preceded by Don Drysdale; Bob Miller; Don Drysdale	Los Angeles Dodgers Opening Day; Starting pitcher 1966; 1968; 1970	Succeeded by Bob Miller; Don Drysdale; Bill Singer
Sporting positions
Preceded by Bob Milliken	St. Louis Cardinals Pitching Coach; 1977–1980	Succeeded by Hub Kittle
Preceded by Herm Starrette	Philadelphia Phillies Pitching Coach; 1982–1988	Succeeded by Darold Knowles
Preceded by Tom House	Texas Rangers Pitching Coach; 1993–1994	Succeeded by Dick Bosman
Preceded by Charlie Hough	Los Angeles Dodgers Pitching Coach; 1999–2000	Succeeded by Dave Wallace
