= 1974 Major League Baseball draft =

Baseball draft of amateur players by Major League Baseball

Overview
- First selection: Bill Almon; San Diego Padres
- First round selections: 24
- Hall of Famers: 1: OF Paul Molitor

The 1974 Major League Baseball draft took place prior to the 1974 MLB season. The draft saw the San Diego Padres select Bill Almon first overall.

== First round selections ==
= All-Star	= Baseball Hall of Famer

The following are the first round picks in the 1974 Major League Baseball draft.

Pick	Player	Team	Position	Hometown/School
1	Bill Almon	San Diego Padres	SS	Brown University
2	Tommy Boggs	Texas Rangers	RHP	Austin, Texas
3	Lonnie Smith	Philadelphia Phillies	OF	Compton, California
4	Tom Brennan	Cleveland Indians	RHP	Lewis University
5	Dale Murphy	Atlanta Braves	C	Portland, Oregon
6	Butch Edge	Milwaukee Brewers	RHP	Sacramento, California
7	Scot Thompson	Chicago Cubs	OF	Renfrew, Pennsylvania
8	Larry Monroe	Chicago White Sox	RHP	Mt. Prospect, Illinois
9	Ron Sorey	Montreal Expos	3B	Dayton, Ohio
10	Mike Miley	California Angels	SS	Louisiana State University
11	Rod Scurry	Pittsburgh Pirates	LHP	Sparks, Nevada
12	Dennis Sherrill	New York Yankees	SS	Miami, Florida
13	Garry Templeton	St. Louis Cardinals	SS	Santa Ana, California
14	Ted Shipley	Minnesota Twins	SS	Vanderbilt University
15	Kevin Drake	Houston Astros	OF	Lompoc, California
16	Lance Parrish	Detroit Tigers	3B	Diamond Bar, California
17	Cliff Speck	New York Mets	RHP	Beaverton, Oregon
18	Willie Wilson	Kansas City Royals	OF	Summit, New Jersey
19	Terry Lee	San Francisco Giants	2B	San Luis Obispo, California
20	Eddie Ford	Boston Red Sox	SS	University of South Carolina
21	Rick Sutcliffe	Los Angeles Dodgers	RHP	Kansas City, Missouri
22	* Jerry Johnson	Oakland Athletics	C	Austin, Texas
23	Steve Reed	Cincinnati Reds	RHP	Fort Wayne, Indiana
24	Rich Dauer	Baltimore Orioles	3B	University of Southern California

* Did not sign

== Other notable selections ==
= All-Star	= Baseball Hall of Famer

Round	Pick	Player	Team	Position
2	38	Butch Wynegar	Minnesota Twins	Catcher
3	56	Pete Vuckovich	Chicago White Sox	Pitcher
5	99	Jim Morrison	Philadelphia Phillies	Third baseman
5	119	Steve Henderson	Cincinnati Reds	Shortstop-Third baseman
6	131	Ed Whitson	Pittsburgh Pirates	Pitcher
8	171	Mark Clear	Philadelphia Phillies	Pitcher
9	214	Ron Oester	Cincinnati Reds	Shortstop
10	220	Mickey Mahler	Atlanta Braves	Pitcher
10	231	Mark Fidrych	Detroit Tigers	Pitcher
11	256	Scott Sanderson*	Kansas City Royals	Pitcher
12	263	Bump Wills*	San Diego Padres	Second baseman
12	268	Jim Gantner	Milwaukee Brewers	Shortstop
14	317	Bob Welch	Chicago Cubs	Pitcher
14	325	Mickey Hatcher*	Houston Astros	Outfielder
19	432	Hubie Brooks*	Montreal Expos	Shortstop
19	447	Steve Bartkowski*	Baltimore Orioles	First baseman
28	585	Paul Molitor*	St. Louis Cardinals	Shortstop
36	667	Eric Show*	Minnesota Twins	Pitcher

* Did not sign

== Background ==
With the number one pick of the June regular phase, San Diego tabbed infielder Bill Almon from Brown University, one of six shortstops selected in round one. Twelve of the first 13 and a total of 16 first round selections went on to become major leaguers, including Lonnie Smith (Philadelphia), Dale Murphy (Atlanta), Garry Templeton (St. Louis), Lance Parrish (Detroit), Willie Wilson (Kansas City) and Rick Sutcliffe (Los Angeles).

Three players from the June regular phase were among the ones who got away. Pitcher Bob Welch (Chicago Cubs, 14th round), infielder Paul Molitor (St. Louis, 28th round) and pitcher Eric Show (Minnesota, 36th round) turned down pro offers for college scholarships.

Preceded by David Clyde	1st Overall Picks; Bill Almon	Succeeded by Danny Goodwin
