= 1974 Montreal Expos season =

1974 Montreal Expos
- League: National League
- Division: East
- Ballpark: Jarry Park
- City: Montreal
- Record: 79–82 (.491)
- Divisional place: 4th
- Owners: Charles Bronfman
- General managers: Jim Fanning
- Managers: Gene Mauch
- Television: CBC Television (Dave Van Horne, Duke Snider); Télévision de Radio-Canada (Jean-Pierre Roy, Guy Ferron)
- Radio: CFCF (English) (Dave Van Horne, Russ Taylor, Ron Reusch, Tom Cheek); CKAC (French) (Claude Raymond, Jacques Doucet)

The 1974 Montreal Expos season was the sixth season in the history of the franchise. The Expos finished in fourth place in the National League East with a record of 79–82, 8 1/2 games behind the Pittsburgh Pirates.

== Offseason ==
- October 26, 1973: Bernie Allen was released by the Expos.
- December 5, 1973: Mike Marshall was traded by the Expos to the Los Angeles Dodgers for Willie Davis.
- January 9, 1974: Joe Kerrigan was drafted by the Expos in the 1st round (10th pick) of the 1974 Major League Baseball draft.

== Spring training ==
The Expos held spring training at City Island Ball Park in Daytona Beach, Florida. It was their second season there.

== Regular season ==
=== Season standings ===
NL East
Team	W	L	Pct.	GB	Home	Road
Pittsburgh Pirates	88	74	.543	—	52‍–‍29	36‍–‍45
St. Louis Cardinals	86	75	.534	1½	44‍–‍37	42‍–‍38
Philadelphia Phillies	80	82	.494	8	46‍–‍35	34‍–‍47
Montreal Expos	79	82	.491	8½	42‍–‍38	37‍–‍44
New York Mets	71	91	.438	17	36‍–‍45	35‍–‍46
Chicago Cubs	66	96	.407	22	32‍–‍49	34‍–‍47

=== Record vs. opponents ===
1974 National League record Sources:
Team	ATL	CHC	CIN	HOU	LAD	MON	NYM	PHI	PIT	SD	SF	STL
Atlanta	—	4–8	7–11–1	6–12	8–10	9–3	8–4	8–4	4–8	17–1	8–10	9–3
Chicago	8–4	—	5–7	4–8	2–10	5–13	8–10	8–10	9–9	6–6	6–6	5–13
Cincinnati	11–7–1	7–5	—	14–4	6–12	6–6	9–3	8–4	8–4	12–6	11–7	6–6
Houston	12–6	8–4	4–14	—	5–13	6–6	6–6	6–6	5–7	7–11	10–8	8–4
Los Angeles	10–8	10–2	12–6	13–5	—	8–4	5–7	6–6	4–8	16–2	12–6	6–6
Montreal	3–9	13–5	6–6	6–6	4–8	—	9–9	11–7	9–9	6–6	4–8	8–9
New York	4–8	10–8	3–9	6–6	7–5	9–9	—	7–11	7–11	6–6	6–6	6–12
Philadelphia	4-8	10–8	4–8	6–6	6–6	7–11	11–7	—	10–8	5–7	8–4	9–9
Pittsburgh	8–4	9–9	4–8	7–5	8–4	9–9	11–7	8–10	—	9–3	8–4	7–11
San Diego	1–17	6–6	6–12	7–11	2–16	6–6	6–6	7–5	3–9	—	11–7	5–7
San Francisco	10–8	6–6	7–11	8–10	6–12	8–4	6–6	4–8	4–8	7–11	—	6–6
St. Louis	3–9	13–5	6–6	4–8	6–6	9–8	12–6	9–9	11–7	7–5	6–6	—

=== Notable transactions ===
- April 1, 1974: John Boccabella was traded by the Expos to the San Francisco Giants for Don Carrithers.
- April 4, 1974: Bill Stoneman was purchased from the Expos by the California Angels.
- June 5, 1974: Bobby Ramos was drafted by the Expos in the 7th round of the 1974 Major League Baseball draft.
- September 5, 1974: Ron Hunt was selected off waivers from the Expos by the St. Louis Cardinals.

=== Roster ===
1974 Montreal Expos
Roster
Pitchers: 28 Dennis Blair; 40 Don Carrithers; 25 Don DeMola; 55 Terry Enyart; 48 Bob Gebhard; 21 Ernie McAnally; 53 John Montague; 15 Balor Moore; 27 Dale Murray; 18 Steve Renko; 45 Steve Rogers; 36 Chuck Taylor; 24 Mike Torrez; 20 Tom Walker	Catchers: 57 Gary Carter; 9,54 Barry Foote; 22 Terry Humphrey; 34 José Morales; 7 Bob Stinson; Infielders: 23 Hal Breeden; 10 Jim Cox; 6 Ron Fairly; 19 Tim Foli; 38 Pepe Frías; 33 Ron Hunt; 16 Mike Jorgensen; 12,51 Larry Lintz; 50 Larry Parrish; 42 Pat Scanlon	Outfielders: 3 Bob Bailey; 17 Larry Biittner; 49 Warren Cromartie; 1 Willie Davis; 8 Boots Day; 2 Jim Lyttle; 11 Pepe Mangual; 2 Jim Northrup; 52 Tony Scott; 29 Ken Singleton; 37 Jerry White; 43 Ron Woods	Manager: 4 Gene Mauch; Coaches: 5 Dave Bristol (Third base); 46 Walt Hriniak (First base); 32 Cal McLish (Pitching); 31 Jerry Zimmerman (Bullpen)

== Player stats ==
=== Batting ===
==== Starters by position ====
Note: Pos = Position; G = Games played; AB = At bats; H = Hits; Avg. = Batting average; HR = Home runs; RBI = Runs batted in

Pos	Player	G	AB	H	Avg.	HR	RBI
C	Barry Foote	125	420	110	.262	11	60
1B	Ron Fairly	101	282	69	.245	12	43
2B	Jim Cox	77	236	52	.220	2	26
SS	Tim Foli	121	441	112	.254	0	39
3B	Ron Hunt	115	403	108	.268	0	26
LF	Bob Bailey	152	507	142	.280	20	73
CF	Willie Davis	153	611	180	.295	12	89
RF	Ken Singleton	148	511	141	.276	9	74

==== Other batters ====
Note: G = Games played; AB = At bats; H = Hits; Avg. = Batting average; HR = Home runs; RBI = Runs batted in

Player	G	AB	H	Avg.	HR	RBI
Larry Lintz	113	319	76	.238	0	20
Mike Jorgensen	131	287	89	.310	11	59
Hal Breeden	79	190	47	.247	2	20
Ron Woods	90	127	26	.205	1	12
Pepe Frías	75	112	24	.214	0	7
Bob Stinson	38	87	15	.172	1	6
Larry Parrish	25	69	14	.203	0	4
Boots Day	52	65	12	.185	0	2
Pepe Mangual	23	61	19	.311	0	4
Jim Northrup	21	54	13	.241	2	8
Terry Humphrey	20	52	10	.192	0	3
Gary Carter	9	27	11	.407	1	6
Larry Biitner	18	26	7	.269	0	3
José Morales	25	26	7	.269	1	5
Warren Cromartie	8	17	3	.176	0	0
Jerry White	9	10	4	.400	0	2
Jim Lyttle	25	9	3	.333	0	2
Tony Scott	19	7	2	.286	0	1
Pat Scanlon	2	4	1	.250	0	0

=== Pitching ===
==== Starting pitchers ====
Note: G = Games pitched; IP = Innings pitched; W = Wins; L = Losses; ERA = Earned run average; SO = Strikeouts

Player	G	IP	W	L	ERA	SO
Steve Rogers	38	253.2	15	22	4.47	154
Steve Renko	37	227.2	12	16	4.03	138
Mike Torrez	32	186.1	15	8	3.57	92
Dennis Blair	22	146.0	11	7	3.27	76
Ernie McAnally	25	128.2	6	13	4.48	79

==== Other pitchers ====
Note: G = Games pitched; IP = Innings pitched; W = Wins; L = Losses; ERA = Earned run average; SO = Strikeouts

Player	G	IP	W	L	ERA	SO
Tom Walker	33	91.2	4	5	3.83	70
Don Carrithers	22	60.0	5	2	3.00	31
Balor Moore	8	13.2	0	2	3.95	16

==== Relief pitchers ====
Note: G = Games pitched; W = Wins; L = Losses; SV = Saves; ERA = Earned run average; SO = Strikeouts

Player	G	W	L	SV	ERA	SO
Chuck Taylor	62	6	2	11	2.17	43
John Montague	46	3	4	3	3.16	43
Dale Murray	32	1	1	10	1.03	31
Don DeMola	25	1	0	0	3.12	47
Terry Enyart	2	0	0	0	16.20	2
Bob Gebhard	1	0	0	0	4.50	0

== Award winners ==
1974 Major League Baseball All-Star Game

== Farm system ==
Level	Team	League	Manager
AAA	Memphis Blues	International League	Karl Kuehl
AA	Québec Carnavals	Eastern League	Lance Nichols
A	Kinston Expos	Carolina League	Jack Damaska
A	West Palm Beach Expos	Florida State League	Gordon Mackenzie
Rookie	GCL Expos	Gulf Coast League	Pat Daugherty

LEAGUE CHAMPIONS: West Palm Beach
