= 1974 New York Mets season =

1974 New York Mets
- League: National League
- Division: East
- Ballpark: Shea Stadium
- City: New York
- Record: 71–91 (.438)
- Divisional place: 5th
- Owners: Joan Whitney Payson
- General manager: Bob Scheffing
- Manager: Yogi Berra
- Television: WOR-TV
- Radio: WHN (Ralph Kiner, Lindsey Nelson, Bob Murphy)

The 1974 New York Mets season was the 13th regular season for the Mets, who played home games at Shea Stadium. Led by manager Yogi Berra, the team finished the season with a record of 71–91, placing fifth in the National League East, seventeen games behind the first place Pittsburgh Pirates. This was the first time the Mets had a losing season since 1968.

== Offseason ==
- March 26, 1974: Buzz Capra was purchased from the Mets by the Atlanta Braves.

== Regular season ==
=== Season standings ===
NL East
Team	W	L	Pct.	GB	Home	Road
Pittsburgh Pirates	88	74	.543	—	52‍–‍29	36‍–‍45
St. Louis Cardinals	86	75	.534	1½	44‍–‍37	42‍–‍38
Philadelphia Phillies	80	82	.494	8	46‍–‍35	34‍–‍47
Montreal Expos	79	82	.491	8½	42‍–‍38	37‍–‍44
New York Mets	71	91	.438	17	36‍–‍45	35‍–‍46
Chicago Cubs	66	96	.407	22	32‍–‍49	34‍–‍47

=== Record vs. opponents ===
1974 National League record Sources:
Team	ATL	CHC	CIN	HOU	LAD	MON	NYM	PHI	PIT	SD	SF	STL
Atlanta	—	4–8	7–11–1	6–12	8–10	9–3	8–4	8–4	4–8	17–1	8–10	9–3
Chicago	8–4	—	5–7	4–8	2–10	5–13	8–10	8–10	9–9	6–6	6–6	5–13
Cincinnati	11–7–1	7–5	—	14–4	6–12	6–6	9–3	8–4	8–4	12–6	11–7	6–6
Houston	12–6	8–4	4–14	—	5–13	6–6	6–6	6–6	5–7	7–11	10–8	8–4
Los Angeles	10–8	10–2	12–6	13–5	—	8–4	5–7	6–6	4–8	16–2	12–6	6–6
Montreal	3–9	13–5	6–6	6–6	4–8	—	9–9	11–7	9–9	6–6	4–8	8–9
New York	4–8	10–8	3–9	6–6	7–5	9–9	—	7–11	7–11	6–6	6–6	6–12
Philadelphia	4-8	10–8	4–8	6–6	6–6	7–11	11–7	—	10–8	5–7	8–4	9–9
Pittsburgh	8–4	9–9	4–8	7–5	8–4	9–9	11–7	8–10	—	9–3	8–4	7–11
San Diego	1–17	6–6	6–12	7–11	2–16	6–6	6–6	7–5	3–9	—	11–7	5–7
San Francisco	10–8	6–6	7–11	8–10	6–12	8–4	6–6	4–8	4–8	7–11	—	6–6
St. Louis	3–9	13–5	6–6	4–8	6–6	9–8	12–6	9–9	11–7	7–5	6–6	—

=== Opening Day starters ===
- Wayne Garrett
- Jerry Grote
- Don Hahn
- Bud Harrelson
- Cleon Jones
- Jerry Koosman
- Félix Millán
- John Milner
- Rusty Staub

=== Notable transactions ===
- June 5, 1974: Bob Myrick was drafted by the Mets in the 20th round of the 1974 Major League Baseball draft.

=== Roster ===
1974 New York Mets
Roster
Pitchers: 22 Jack Aker; 34 Bob Apodaca; 38 Jerry Cram; 48 Nino Espinosa; 36 Jerry Koosman; 32 Jon Matlack; 45 Tug McGraw; 30 Bob Miller; 31 Harry Parker; 33 Ray Sadecki; 41 Tom Seaver; 35 Randy Sterling; 40 George Stone; 39 John Strohmayer; 27 Craig Swan; 29 Hank Webb	Catchers: 10 Duffy Dyer; 15 Jerry Grote; 20 Ike Hampton; 42 Ron Hodges; Infielders: 12 Ken Boswell; 11 Wayne Garrett; 3 Bud Harrelson; 23 Ted Martínez; 17 Félix Millán; 28 John Milner; 2 Brock Pemberton; 6 Rich Puig; 9 George Theodore	Outfielders: 18 Benny Ayala; 26 Bruce Boisclair; 19 Jim Gosger; 25 Don Hahn; 21 Cleon Jones; 7 Ed Kranepool; 16 Dave Schneck; 4 Rusty Staub	Manager: 8 Yogi Berra; Coaches: 51 Roy McMillan; 52 Joe Pignatano; 54 Rube Walker; 53 Eddie Yost

== Player stats ==
=== Batting ===
==== Starters by position ====
Note: Pos = Position; G = Games played; AB = At bats; H = Hits; Avg. = Batting average; HR = Home runs; RBI = Runs batted in

Pos	Player	G	AB	H	Avg.	HR	RBI
C	Jerry Grote	97	319	82	.257	5	36
1B	John Milner	137	507	128	.252	20	63
2B	Félix Millán	136	518	139	.268	1	33
SS	Bud Harrelson	106	331	75	.227	1	13
3B	Wayne Garrett	151	522	117	.224	13	53
LF	Cleon Jones	124	461	130	.282	13	60
CF	Don Hahn	110	323	81	.251	4	28
RF	Rusty Staub	161	561	145	.258	19	78

==== Other batters ====
Note: G = Games played; AB = At bats; H = Hits; Avg. = Batting average; HR = Home runs; RBI = Runs batted in

Pos	Player	G	AB	H	Avg.	HR	RBI
SS-OF	Ted Martinez	116	334	73	.219	2	43
OF	Dave Schneck	93	254	52	.205	5	25
2B-3B	Ken Boswell	96	222	48	.216	2	15
1B	Ed Kranepool	94	217	65	.300	4	24
C	Duffy Dyer	63	142	30	.211	0	10
C	Ron Hodges	59	136	30	.221	4	14
LF-PH	George Theodore	60	76	12	.158	1	1
OF-PH	Benny Ayala	23	68	16	.235	2	8
OF	Jim Gosger	26	33	3	.091	0	0
1B-PH	Brock Pemberton	11	22	4	.182	0	1
OF	Bruce Boisclair	7	12	3	.250	0	1
2B-3B	Rich Puig	4	10	0	.000	0	0
C-PH	Ike Hampton	4	4	0	.000	0	1

=== Pitching ===
==== Starting pitchers ====
Note: G = Games pitched; IP = Innings pitched; W = Wins; L = Losses; ERA = Earned run average; SO = Strikeouts

Player	G	IP	W	L	ERA	SO
Jon Matlack	34	265.1	13	15	2.41	195
Jerry Koosman	35	265.0	15	11	3.36	188
Tom Seaver	32	232.0	11	11	3.20	201
George Stone	15	77.0	2	7	5.03	29

==== Other pitchers ====
Note: G = Games pitched; IP = Innings pitched; W = Wins; L = Losses; ERA = Earned run average; SO = Strikeouts

Player	G	IP	W	L	ERA	SO
Harry Parker	40	131.0	4	12	3.92	58
Bob Apodaca	35	103.0	6	6	3.50	54
Ray Sadecki	34	103.0	8	8	3.41	46
Craig Swan	7	30.1	1	3	4.45	10
Hank Webb	3	10.0	0	2	7.20	8
Randy Sterling	3	9.1	1	1	4.82	2
Nino Espinosa	2	9.0	0	0	5.00	2

==== Relief pitchers ====
Note: G = Games pitched; W = Wins; L = Losses; SV = Saves; ERA = Earned run average; SO = Strikeouts

Player	G	W	L	SV	ERA	SO	IP
Bob Miller	58	2	2	2	3.58	35	78.0
Tug McGraw	41	6	11	3	4.16	54	88.2
Jack Aker	24	2	1	2	3.48	18	41.1
Jerry Cram	10	0	1	3	1.61	8	22.1
John Strohmayer	1	0	0	0	0.00	0	1.0

== Farm system ==
Level	Team	League	Manager
AAA	Tidewater Tides	International League	John Antonelli
AA	Victoria Toros	Texas League	Joe Frazier
A	Visalia Mets	California League	Nolan Campbell
A	Anderson Mets	Western Carolinas League	Owen Friend
A-Short Season	Batavia Trojans	New York–Penn League	Wilbur Huckle
Rookie	Marion Mets	Appalachian League	Chuck Hiller

LEAGUE CHAMPIONS: Victoria

== Japan tour ==
The Mets' tour of Japan began with its departure from John F. Kennedy International Airport on October 23. The team's charter flight included stops to pick up players in San Francisco and Anchorage, Alaska, the latter for Jerry Koosman. Two nonparticipants were Ray Sadecki and Duffy Dyer who were both traded, the former to the St. Louis Cardinals for Joe Torre on October 13 and the latter to the Pittsburgh Pirates for Gene Clines on October 22. Torre was the only one of the two new Mets to participate in the tour. Starters Rusty Staub, Jerry Grote, Bud Harrelson and Cleon Jones elected to forego the tour for various personal reasons. The ballclub arrived at Haneda Airport on October 24 after a combined 21-hour flight.

Both Torre and Tom Seaver were dealing with health issues, shoulder for the former and back and hip for the latter.

Game	Month	Date	Day	Place	Opponent	W/L/D	Score	Mets Starting Pitcher	Notes
1	OCT	26	SA	Tokyo	Yomiuri Giants	L	7–10	Tom Seaver	Sadaharu Oh grand slam off Jerry Cram in eighth. John Milner, Wayne Garrett and Dave Schneck each homer.
2	OCT	28	M	Tokyo	Yomiuri Giants	D	4–4	Jon Matlack	4–2 lead disappears as Jack Aker walks five Giants batters in ninth. Don Hahn homers.
3	OCT	29	TU	Sapporo	Yomiuri Giants				
4	OCT	30	W	Sendai	Yomiuri Giants	L	2–3	Tom Seaver	Seaver allows two runs in first six innings. Deciding run off Hank Webb in seventh. Ed Kranepool solo home run.
5	OCT	31	TH	Kōriyama	Yomiuri Giants	D	3–3 (9)	Bob Apodaca	Milner game-tying solo homer in ninth; Jack Aker's final Mets appearance before waived on NOV 6.
6	NOV								
7	NOV								
8	NOV	4	M	Tokyo	Yomiuri Giants	L	4–10	Tom Seaver	17 hits combined off Seaver, Webb, Cram and Bob Miller. Milner homers.
9	NOV	6	W	Niigata	Yomiuri Giants	L	4–9	Randy Tate	Tate gives up three runs in first; Dave Schneck and Joe Torre each hit a homer.
10	NOV	7	TH	Toyama	Yomiuri Giants	W	6–3	Jon Matlack	Twelve hits for Mets; single, double and three RBI for Torre.
11	NOV	9	SA	Osaka	Yomiuri Giants/Nankai Hawks	W	6–4	Jerry Koosman	Milner and Kranepool each hit a home run.
12	NOV								
13	NOV	12	TU	Matsuyama	Yomiuri Giants	W	7–5	Jon Matlack	Kranepool homers twice despite Matlack surrendering five runs in first three innings.
14	NOV	14	TH	Hiroshima	Yomiuri Giants/Hiroshima Toyo Carp	W	4–0	Jerry Koosman	Torre hits three-run homer in fourth; Koosman pitches a five-hit shutout.
15	NOV	16	SA	Fukuoka	Yomiuri Giants/Taiheiyo Club Lions	L	0–2	Tom Seaver	Seaver takes shutout into eighth, but Mets batters combine for only two hits.
16	NOV	18	M	Kokura	Yomiuri Giants	W	9–5		Homers by Félix Millán and Teddy Martínez spark a five-run ninth-inning rally.
17	NOV								
18	NOV								
