= List of New York Mets first-round draft picks =

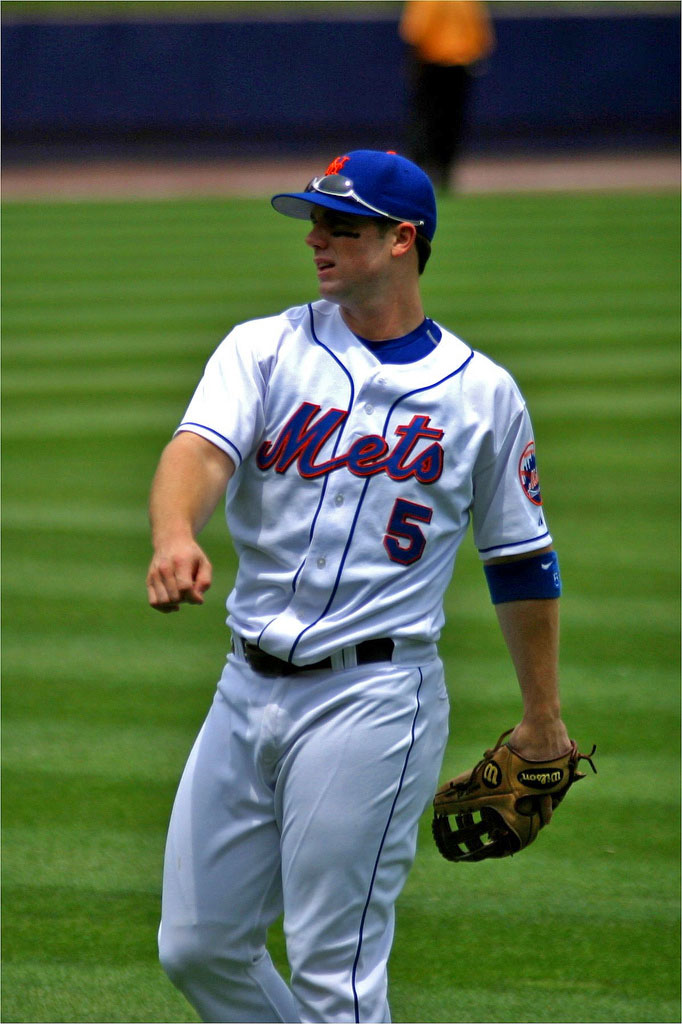
David Wright, one of the Mets' first-round picks in 2001

The New York Mets are a Major League Baseball franchise based in New York City. They play in the National League East division. Since the institution of Major League Baseball's Rule 4 Draft, the Mets have selected 63 players in its first round. Officially known as the "First-Year Player Draft", the Rule 4 Draft is Major League Baseball's primary mechanism for assigning amateur baseball players from high schools, colleges, and other amateur baseball clubs to its teams. The draft order is determined based on the previous season's standings, and the team that had the worst record receives the first pick. In addition, teams that lost free agents in the previous off-season may be awarded compensatory or supplementary picks. The First-Year Player Draft is unrelated to the 1961 expansion draft in which the Mets initially filled their roster.

Of the 63 players picked in the first round by the Mets, 25 have been pitchers, the most of any position; 18 of these were right-handed, while seven were left-handed. 18 of the players picked in the initial round were outfielders, while eight shortstops, six catchers, and three third basemen were selected. The team also selected two players at first base and one at second base. 14 of the players came from high schools or universities in the state of California, while Florida and Texas follow, with nine and five players, respectively.

Four Mets' first-round picks have won championships with the franchise. No first-round picks were on the 1969 championship team. Outfielders Lee Mazzilli (1973) and Darryl Strawberry (1980), shortstop Wally Backman (1977), and pitcher Dwight Gooden (1982) played in the 1986 World Series for the Mets' second championship team. Three first-round draft picks have gone on to win the Rookie of the Year Award with the Mets: Jon Matlack in 1972, Strawberry in 1983, and Gooden in 1984. Gooden went on to win the Cy Young Award in 1985, his second season, after placing second in the voting his rookie year. Gooden is also the only first-round draft pick of the Mets to make the All-Star team in his rookie season.

The Mets have made 11 selections in the supplemental round of the draft. They have also made the first overall selection five times (1966, 1968, 1980, 1984, and 1994), tied for the most such picks with the San Diego Padres. The first of these picks, Steve Chilcott (1966), is one of only two first overall picks (along with Brien Taylor) to never play in the major leagues. The Mets have had 18 compensatory picks since the institution of the First-Year Player Draft in 1965. These additional picks are provided when a team loses a particularly valuable free agent in the prior off-season,^{[V]} or, more recently, if a team fails to sign a draft pick from the previous year. One player, George Ambrow (1970), did not sign with the Mets after he was drafted but they received no compensation pick.

== Key ==
Year	Each year links to an article about that year's Major League Baseball draft.
Position	Indicates the secondary/collegiate position at which the player was drafted, rather than the professional position the player may have gone on to play
Pick	Indicates the number of the pick within the first round
*	Player did not sign with the Mets
	Indicates a supplemental pick
'86	Player played in 1986 World Series for Mets' championship team

== Picks ==
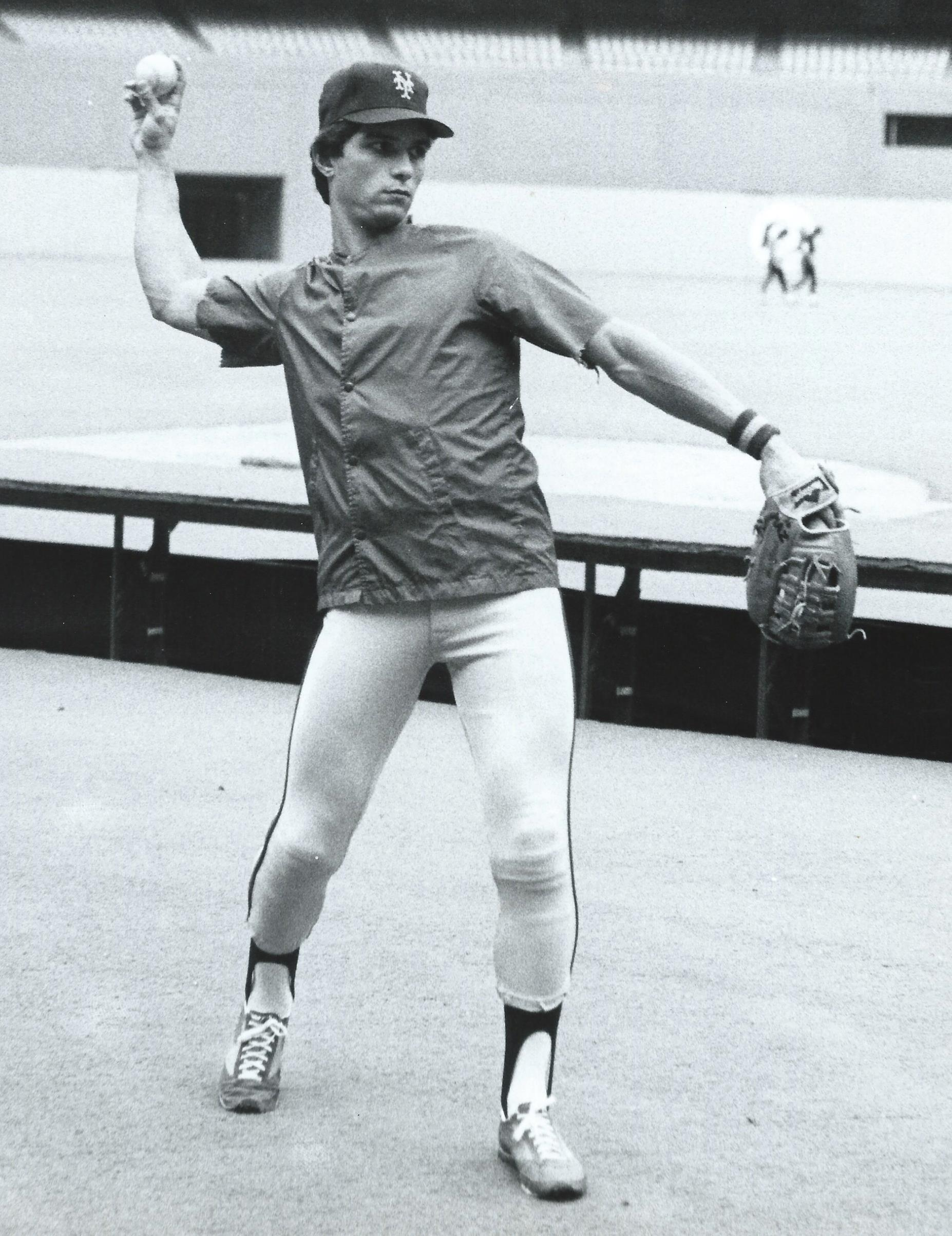
Lee Mazzilli (1973) was the first New Yorker drafted by the Mets in the first round.

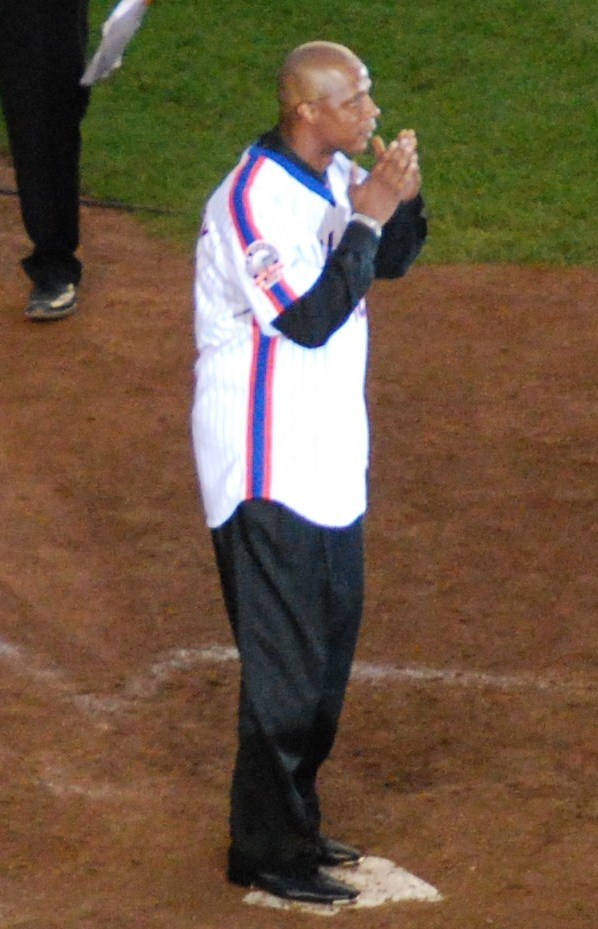
Darryl Strawberry (1980) won the Rookie of the Year Award with the Mets in 1983.

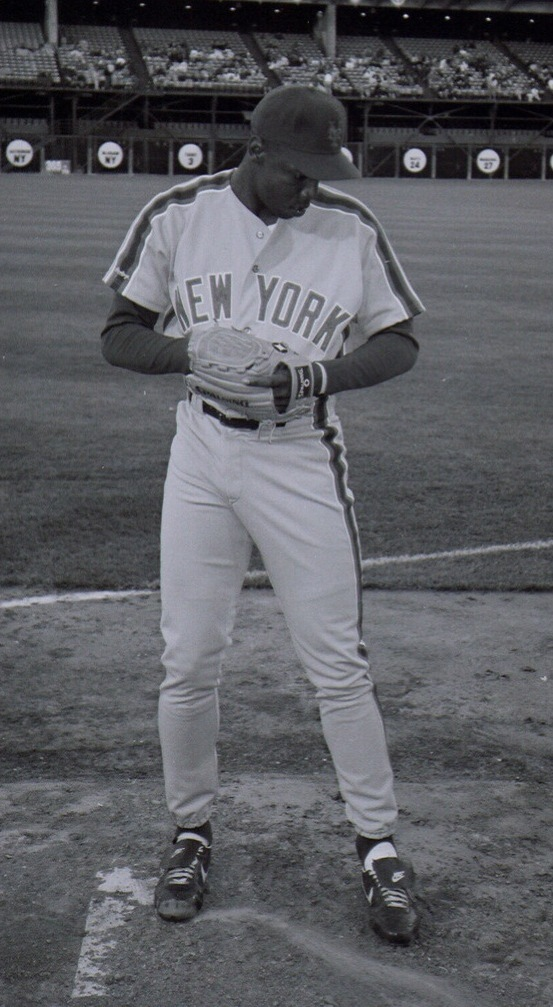
Dwight Gooden (1982) won the Rookie of the Year Award in 1984 and the Cy Young Award the following season.

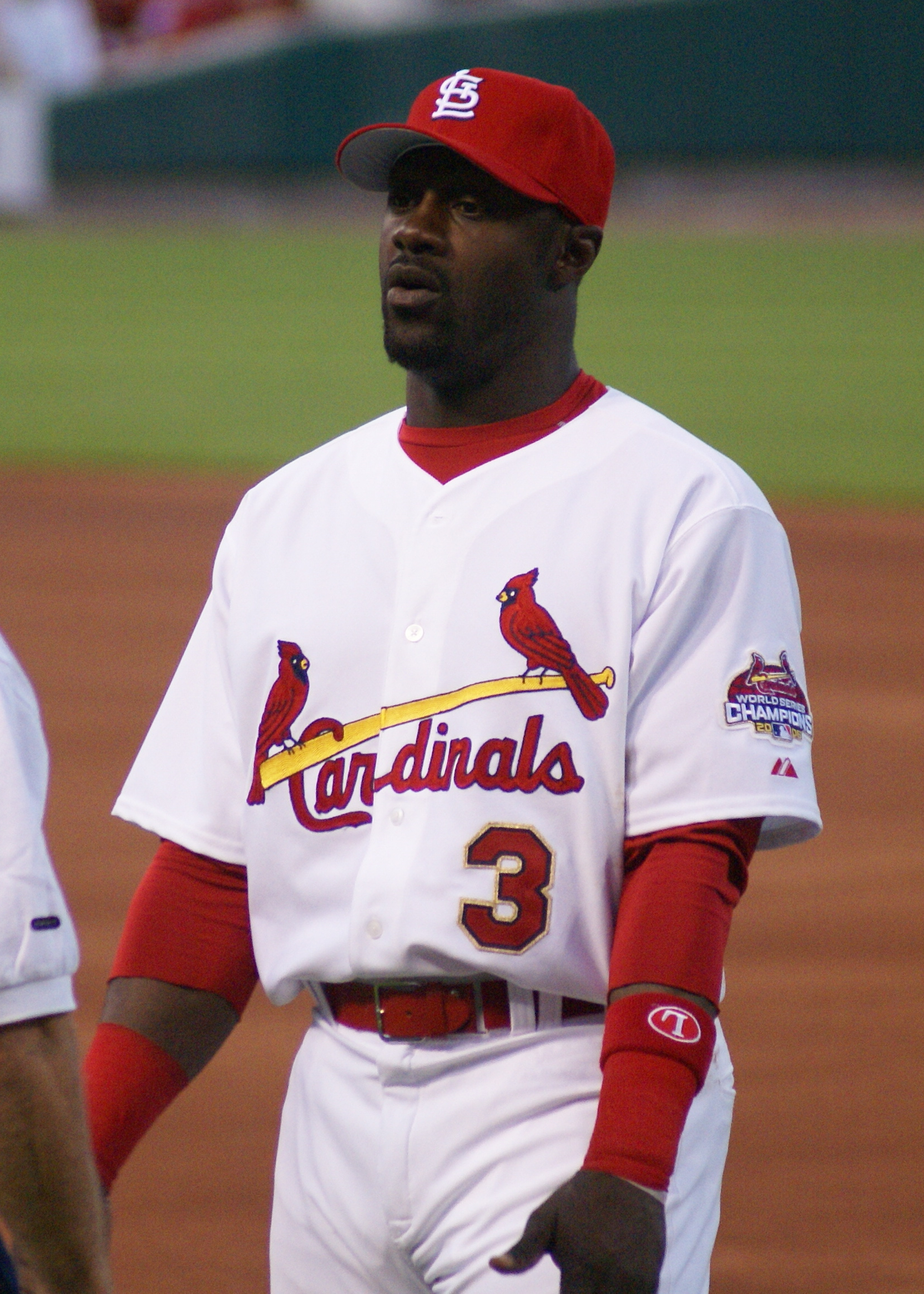
Preston Wilson was the first of three players drafted by the Mets in the first round of the 1992 draft.

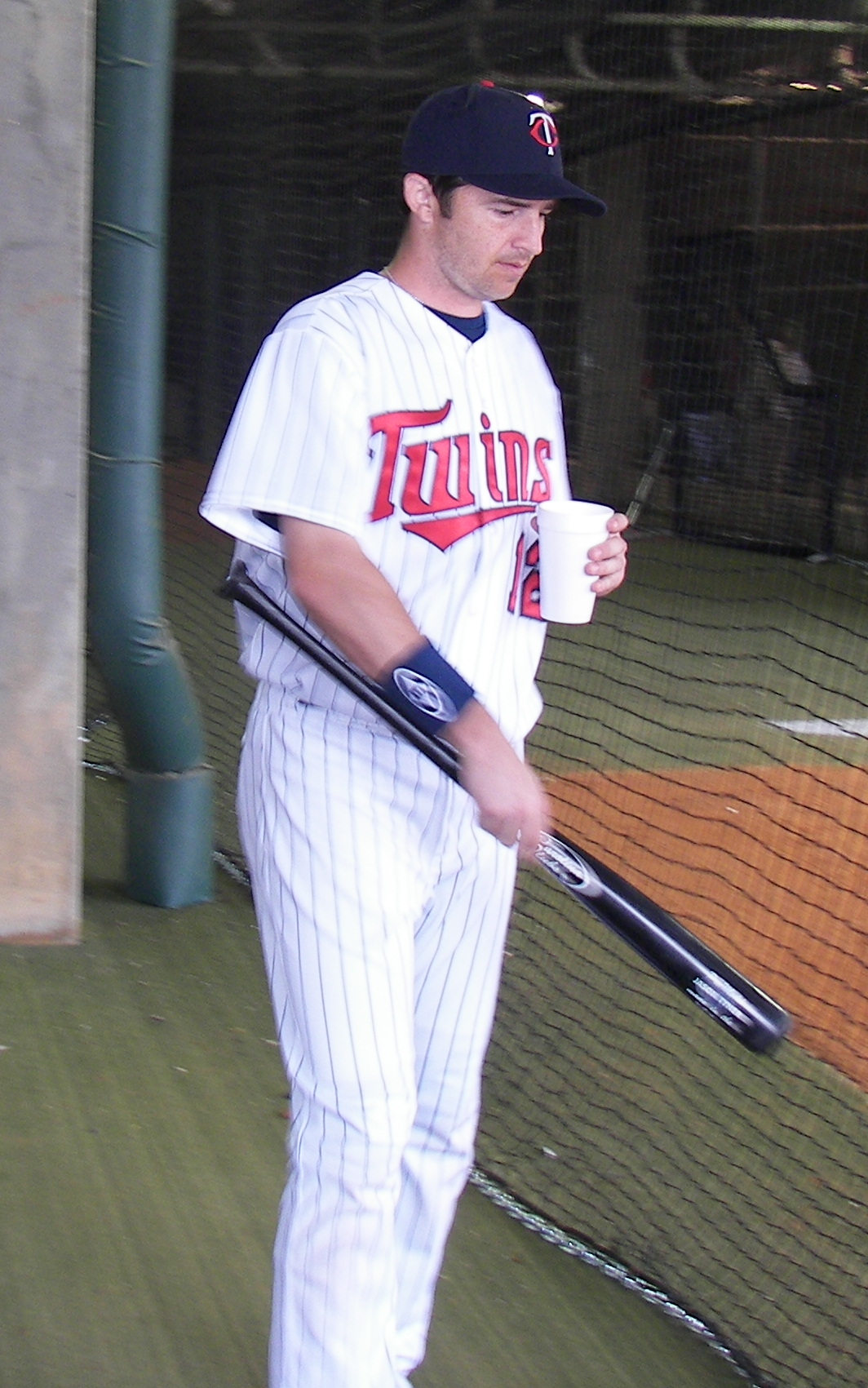
Jason Tyner (1998)

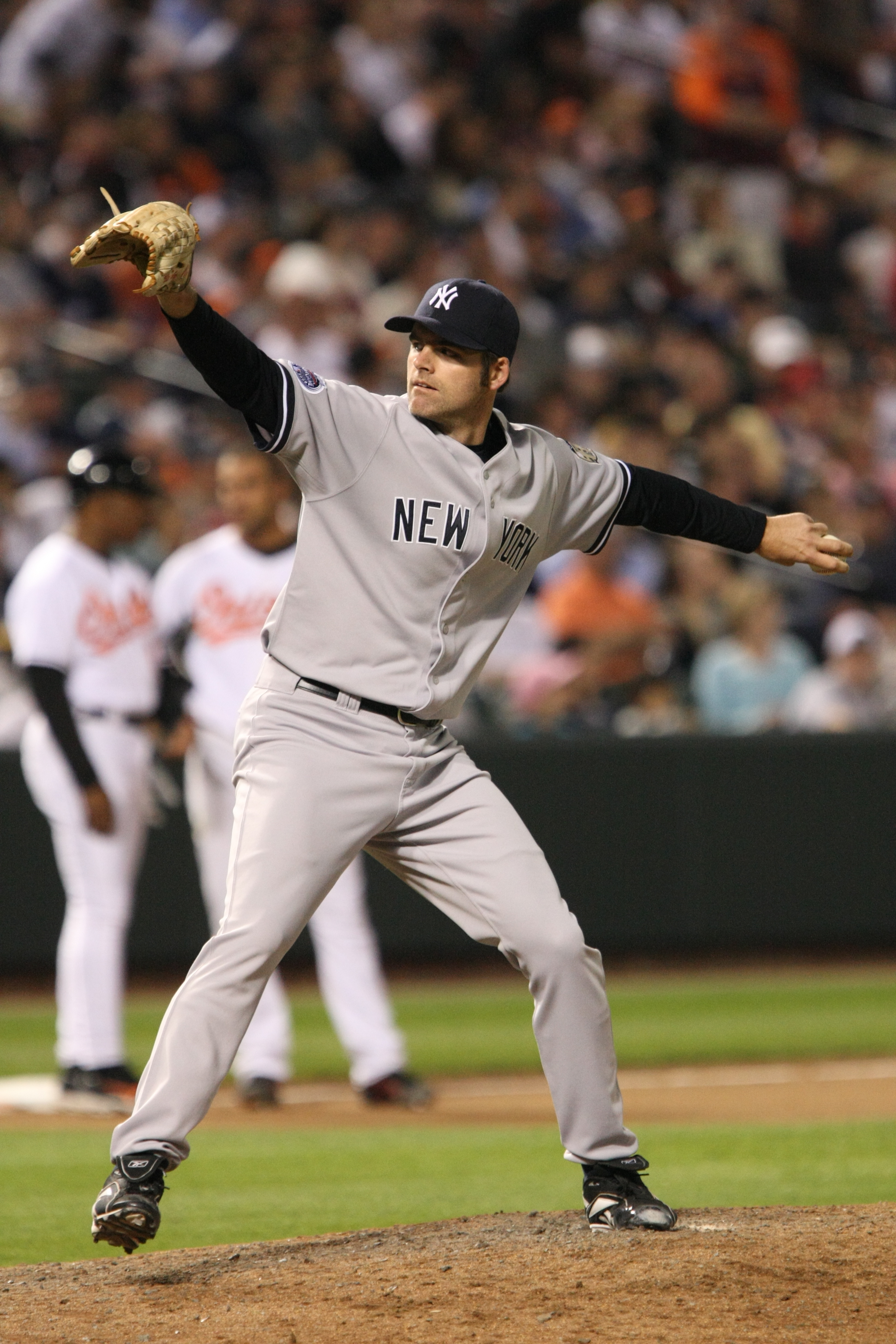
Billy Traber (2000) was the second player drafted from Loyola Marymount University by the Mets in the first round.

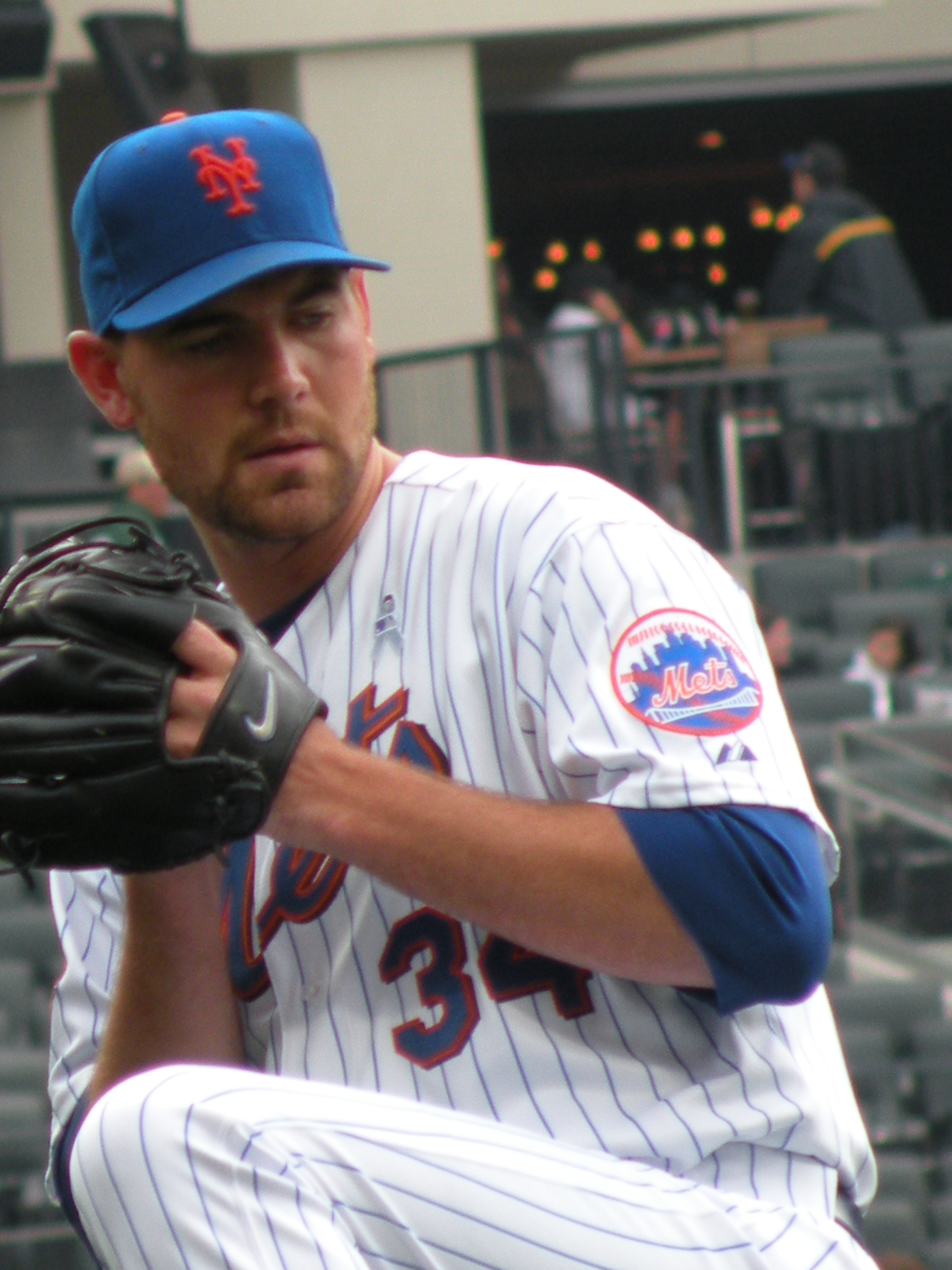
Mike Pelfrey (2005) was the second player from the state of Kansas drafted by the Mets in the first round.

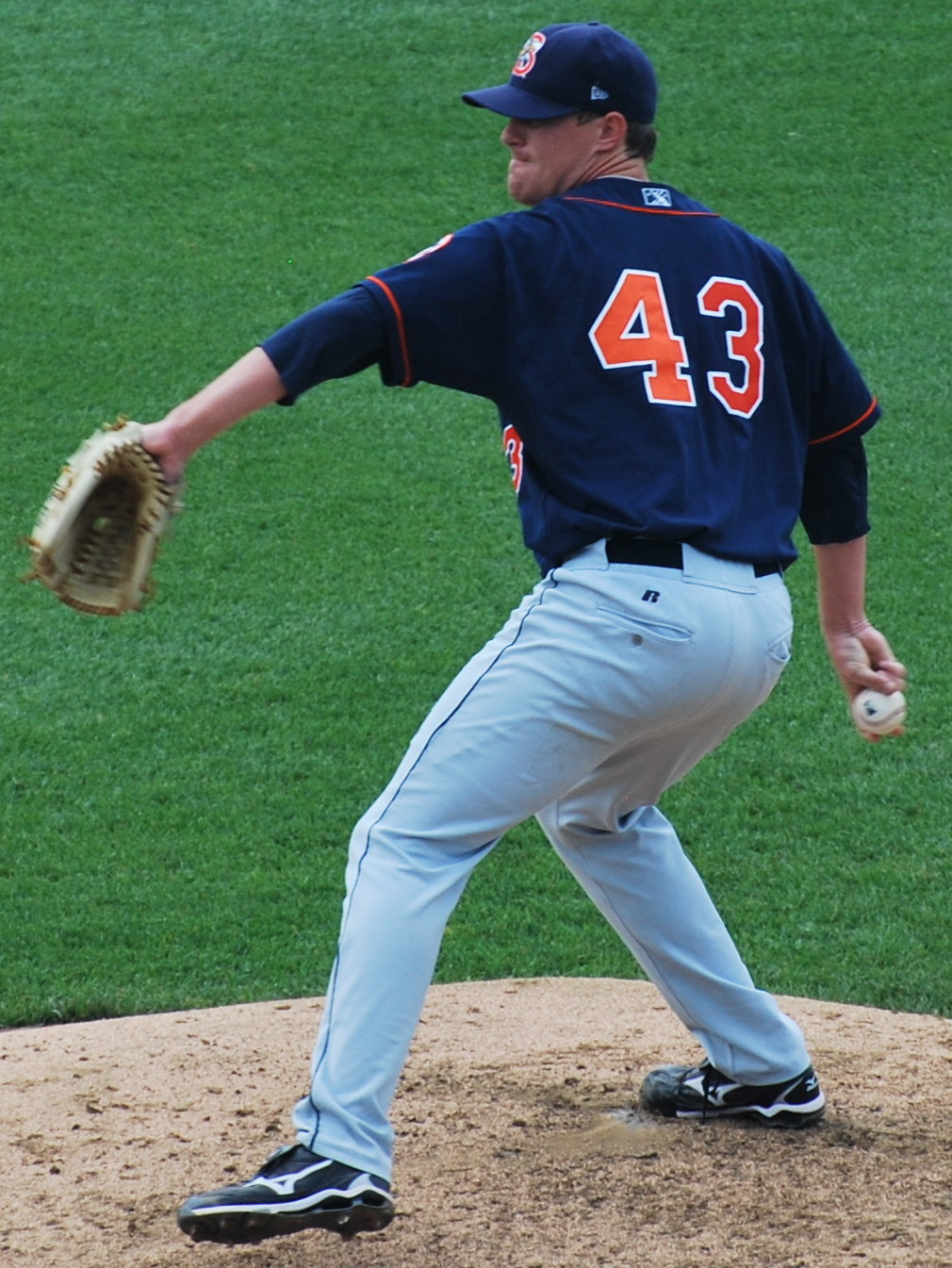
As of 2021, Brad Holt (2008) is the Mets' most recent first-round draft pick to retire without reaching the Major Leagues.

Year	Name	Position	School (Location)	Pick	Ref
1965	Les Rohr	Left-handed pitcher	West High School (Billings, Montana)	2	
1966	Steve Chilcott	Catcher	Antelope Valley High School (Lancaster, California)	1	
1967	Jon Matlack	Left-handed pitcher	Henderson High School (West Chester, Pennsylvania)	4	
1968	Tim Foli	Shortstop	Notre Dame High School (Sherman Oaks, California)	1	
1969	Randy Sterling	Right-handed pitcher	Key West High School (Key West, Florida)	4	
1970	George Ambrow*	Shortstop	Long Beach Polytechnic High School (Long Beach, California)	23	
1971	Rich Puig	Second baseman	Hillsborough High School (Tampa, Florida)	14	
1972	Richard Bengston	Catcher	Richwoods High School (Peoria, Illinois)	13	
1973	Lee Mazzilli '86	Outfielder	Abraham Lincoln High School (Brooklyn, New York)	14	
1974	Cliff Speck	Right-handed pitcher	Beaverton High School (Beaverton, Oregon)	17	
1975	Butch Benton	Catcher	Godby High School (Tallahassee, Florida)	6	
1976	Tom Thurberg	Outfielder	South Weymouth High School (Weymouth, Massachusetts)	13	
1977	Wally Backman '86	Shortstop	Aloha High School (Aloha, Oregon)	16	
1978	Hubie Brooks	Outfielder	Arizona State University (Tempe, Arizona)	3	
1979	Tim Leary	Right-handed pitcher	UCLA (Los Angeles, California)	2	
1980	Darryl Strawberry '86	Outfielder	Crenshaw High School (Los Angeles, California)	1	
1980	Billy Beane	Outfielder	Mount Carmel High School (San Diego, California)	23^{[a]}	
1980	John Gibbons	Catcher	MacArthur High School (San Antonio, Texas)	24^{[b]}	
1981	Terry Blocker	Outfielder	Tennessee State University (Nashville, Tennessee)	4	
1982	Dwight Gooden '86	Right-handed pitcher	Hillsborough High School (Tampa, Florida)	5	
1983	Eddie Williams	Third baseman	Hoover High School (San Diego, California)	4	
1983	Stan Jefferson	Outfielder	Bethune-Cookman College (Daytona Beach, Florida)	20^{[c]}	
1983	Calvin Schiraldi	Right-handed pitcher	University of Texas at Austin (Austin, Texas)	27^{§}^{[d]}	
1984	Shawn Abner	Outfielder	Mechanicsburg Area High School (Mechanicsburg, Pennsylvania)	1	
1985	Gregg Jefferies	Shortstop	Serra High School (San Mateo, California)	20	
1986	Lee May Jr.	Outfielder	Purcell Marian High School (Cincinnati)	21	
1987	Chris Donnels	Third baseman	Loyola Marymount University (Los Angeles, California)	24	
1988	Dave Proctor	Right-handed pitcher	Allen County CC (Iola, Kansas)	21	
1989	Alan Zinter	Catcher	University of Arizona (Tucson, Arizona)	24	
1990	Jeromy Burnitz	Outfielder	Oklahoma State University (Stillwater, Oklahoma)	17	
1991	Al Shirley	Outfielder	George Washington High School (Danville, Virginia)	18^{[e]}	
1991	Bobby Jones	Right-handed pitcher	California State University, Fresno (Fresno, California)	36^{§}^{[f]}	
1992	Preston Wilson	Shortstop	Bamberg Ehrhardt High School (Bamberg, South Carolina)	9	
1992	Chris Roberts	Left-handed pitcher	Florida State University (Tallahassee, Florida)	18^{[g]}	
1992	Jon Ward	Right-handed pitcher	Huntington Beach High School (Huntington Beach, California)	30^{§}^{[h]}	
1993	Kirk Presley	Right-handed pitcher	Tupelo High School (Tupelo, Mississippi)	8	
1994	Paul Wilson	Right-handed pitcher	Florida State University (Tallahassee, Florida)	1	
1994	Terrence Long	First baseman	Stanhope Elmore High School (Millbrook, Alabama)	20^{[i]}	
1994	Jay Payton	Outfielder	Georgia Institute of Technology (Atlanta, Georgia)	29^{§}^{[j]}	
1995	Ryan Jaroncyk	Shortstop	Orange Glen High School (Escondido, California)	18	
1996	Robert Stratton	Outfielder	San Marcos High School (San Marcos, California)	13	
1997	Geoff Goetz	Left-handed pitcher	Jesuit High School (Tampa, Florida)	6	
1998	Jason Tyner	Outfielder	Texas A&M (College Station, Texas)	21	
1999	no first-round pick^{[k]}				
2000	Billy Traber	Left-handed pitcher	Loyola Marymount University (Los Angeles, California)	16^{[l]}	
2000	Bobby Keppel	Right-handed pitcher	De Smet Jesuit High School (Creve Coeur, Missouri)	36^{§}^{[m]}	
2001	Aaron Heilman	Right-handed pitcher	University of Notre Dame (Notre Dame, Indiana)	18^{[n]}	
2001	David Wright	Third baseman	Hickory High School (Chesapeake, Virginia)	38^{§}^{[o]}	
2002	Scott Kazmir	Left-handed pitcher	Cypress Falls High School (Houston, Texas)	15	
2003	Lastings Milledge	Outfielder	Lakewood Ranch High School (Bradenton, Florida)	12	
2004	Philip Humber	Right-handed pitcher	Rice University (Houston, Texas)	3	
2005	Mike Pelfrey	Right-handed pitcher	Wichita State University (Wichita, Kansas)	9	
2006	no first-round pick^{[p]}				
2007	Eddie Kunz	Right-handed pitcher	Oregon State University (Corvallis, Oregon)	42^{§}^{[q]}	
2007	Nathan Vineyard	Left-handed pitcher	Woodland High School (Cartersville, Georgia)	47^{§}^{[r]}	
2008	Ike Davis	First baseman	Arizona State University (Tempe, Arizona)	18^{[s]}	
2008	Reese Havens	Shortstop	University of South Carolina (Columbia, South Carolina)	22	
2008	Bradley Holt	Right-handed pitcher	University of North Carolina at Wilmington (Wilmington, North Carolina)	33^{§}^{[t]}	
2009	no first-round pick^{[u]}				
2010	Matt Harvey	Right-handed pitcher	University of North Carolina at Chapel Hill (Chapel Hill, North Carolina)	7	
2011	Brandon Nimmo	Outfielder	Cheyenne East High School (Cheyenne, Wyoming)	13	
2011	Michael Fulmer	Right-handed pitcher	Deer Creek High School (Edmond, Oklahoma)	44^{§}^{[v]}	
2012	Gavin Cecchini	Shortstop	Barbe High School (Lake Charles, Louisiana)	12	
2012	Kevin Plawecki	Catcher	Purdue University (West Lafayette, Indiana)	35^{§}^{[w]}	
2013	Dominic Smith	First baseman	Serra High School (Gardena, California)	11	
2014	Michael Conforto	Outfielder	Oregon State University (Corvallis, Oregon)	10	
2015	no first-round pick^{[x]}				
2016	Justin Dunn	Right-handed pitcher	Boston College (Chestnut Hill, Massachusetts)	19	
2016	Anthony Kay	Left-handed pitcher	University of Connecticut (Storrs, Connecticut)	31^{§}^{[y]}	
2017	David Peterson	Left-handed pitcher	University of Oregon (Eugene, Oregon)	20	
2018	Jarred Kelenic	Outfielder	Waukesha West High School (Waukesha, Wisconsin)	6	
2019	Brett Baty	Third baseman	Lake Travis High School (Austin, Texas)	12	
2020	Pete Crow-Armstrong	Outfielder	Harvard-Westlake School (Los Angeles, California)	19	
2021	Kumar Rocker*	Right-handed pitcher	Vanderbilt University (Nashville, Tennessee)	10	
2022	Kevin Parada	Catcher	Georgia Tech (Atlanta, Georgia)	11	
2022	Jett Williams	Shortstop	Rockwall-Heath High School (Heath, Texas)	14	
2023	Colin Houck	Shortstop	Parkview High School (GA)	32	
2024	Carson Benge	Outfielder	Oklahoma State University (Stillwater, Oklahoma)	19	
2025	Mitch Voit	Second Baseman	University of Michigan (Ann Arbor, Michigan)	38^{§}	
2026	Carson Wiggins	Right-handed pitcher	University of Arkansas (Fayetteville, Arkansas)	27^{§}	

== See also ==
- New York Mets minor league players

== Footnotes ==
- ^{V} Free agents are evaluated by the Elias Sports Bureau and rated "Type A", "Type B", or not compensation eligible. If a team offers arbitration to a player but that player refuses and subsequently signs with another team, the original team may receive additional draft picks. If a "Type A" free agent leaves in this way his previous team receives a supplemental pick and a compensation pick from the team with which he signs. If a "Type B" free agent leaves in this way his previous team receives only a supplemental pick.
- ^{a} The Mets gained a compensatory first-round pick in 1980 from the Pittsburgh Pirates for losing free agent Andy Hassler.
- ^{b} The Mets gained a compensatory first-round pick in 1980 from the Boston Red Sox for losing free agent Skip Lockwood.
- ^{c} The Mets gained a compensatory first-round pick in 1983 from the Atlanta Braves for losing free agent Pete Falcone.
- ^{d} The Mets gained a supplemental first-round pick in 1983 for losing free agent Pete Falcone.
- ^{e} The Mets gained a compensatory first-round pick in 1991 from the Los Angeles Dodgers for losing free agent Darryl Strawberry.
- ^{f} The Mets gained a supplemental first-round pick in 1991 for losing free agent Darryl Strawberry.
- ^{g} The Mets gained a compensatory first-round pick in 1992 from the Boston Red Sox for losing free agent Frank Viola.
- ^{h} The Mets gained a supplemental first-round pick in 1992 for losing free agent Frank Viola.
- ^{i} The Mets gained a compensatory first-round pick in 1994 from the Baltimore Orioles for losing free agent Sid Fernandez.
- ^{j} The Mets gained a supplemental first-round pick in 1994 for losing free agent Sid Fernandez.
- ^{k} The Mets lost their first-round pick in 1999 to the Chicago White Sox as compensation for signing free agent Robin Ventura.
- ^{l} The Mets gained a compensatory first-round pick in 2000 from the Seattle Mariners for losing free agent John Olerud.
- ^{m} The Mets gained a supplemental first-round pick in 2000 for losing free agent John Olerud.
- ^{n} The Mets gained a compensatory first-round pick in 2001 from the Colorado Rockies for losing free agent Mike Hampton.
- ^{o} The Mets gained a supplemental first-round pick in 2001 for losing free agent Mike Hampton.
- ^{p} The Mets lost their first-round pick in 2006 to the Philadelphia Phillies as compensation for signing free agent Billy Wagner.
- ^{q} The Mets lost their original first-round pick in 2007 to the San Francisco Giants as compensation for signing free agent Moisés Alou but gained a supplemental first-round pick for losing free agent Roberto Hernández.
- ^{r} The Mets gained a supplemental first-round pick in 2007 for losing free agent Chad Bradford.
- ^{s} The Mets gained a compensatory first-round pick in 2008 from the Atlanta Braves for losing free agent Tom Glavine.
- ^{t} The Mets gained a supplemental first-round pick in 2008 for losing free agent Tom Glavine.
- ^{u} The Mets lost their first-round pick in 2009 to the Los Angeles Angels as compensation for signing free agent Francisco Rodríguez.
- ^{v} The Mets gained a supplemental first-round pick in 2011 for losing free agent Pedro Feliciano.
- ^{w} The Mets gained a supplemental first-round pick in 2012 for losing free agent José Reyes.
- ^{x} The Mets lost their first-round pick in 2015 to the Colorado Rockies as compensation for signing free agent Michael Cuddyer.
- ^{y} The Mets gained a supplemental first-round pick in 2016 for losing free agent Daniel Murphy.
