= Allan Dykstra =

American baseball player (born 1987)

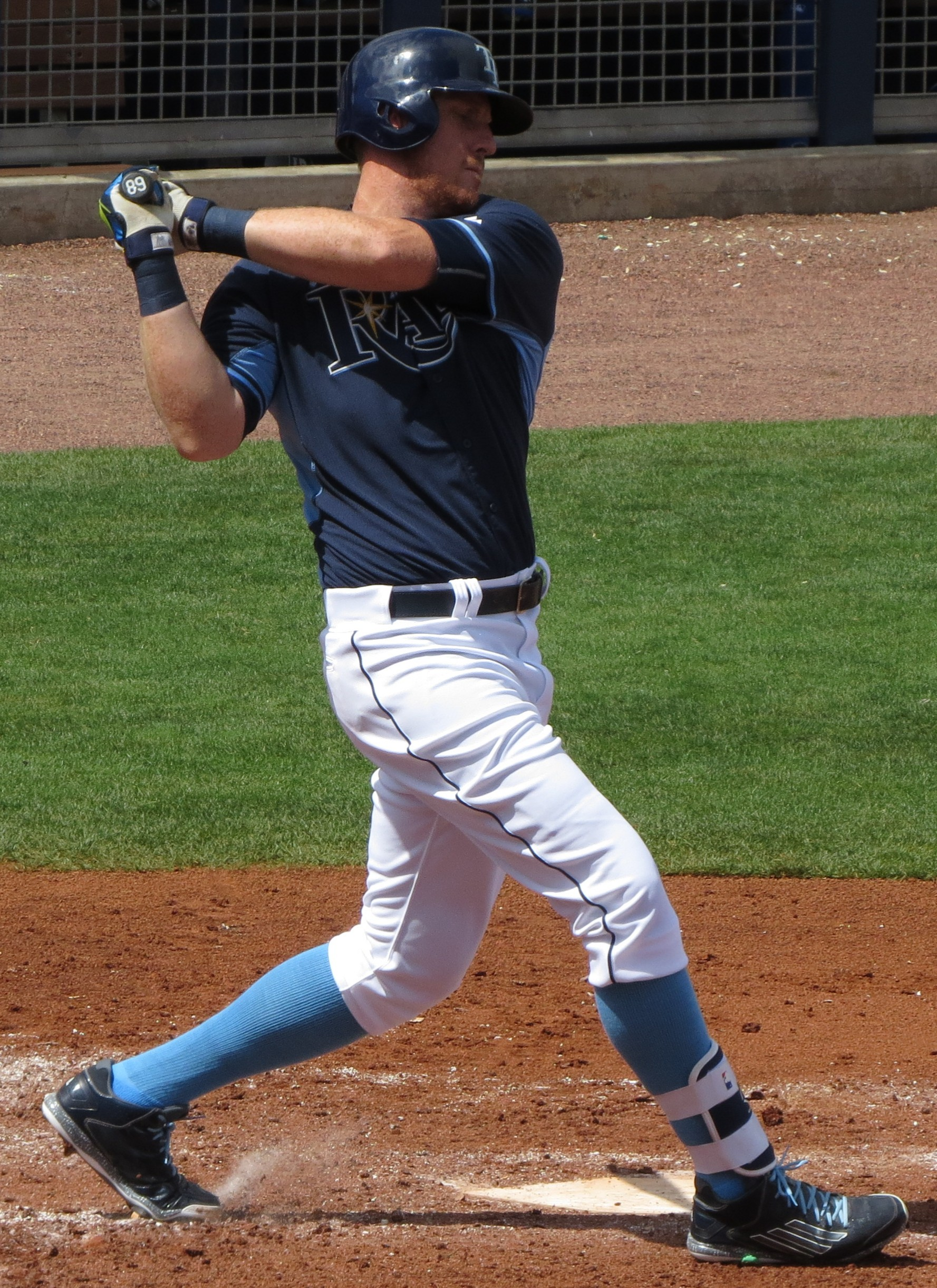
- Dykstra batting for the Tampa Bay Rays in 2015
- First baseman
- Born: May 21, 1987 (age 39); San Diego, California, U.S.
- Batted: Left Threw: Right

MLB debut
- April 8, 2015, for the Tampa Bay Rays

Last appearance
- April 23, 2015, for the Tampa Bay Rays

MLB statistics
- Batting average: .129
- Home runs: 1
- Runs batted in: 4
- Stats at Baseball Reference

Teams
- Tampa Bay Rays (2015)

Allan Christopher Dykstra (born May 21, 1987) is an American former Major League Baseball (MLB) first baseman who played for the Tampa Bay Rays in 2015. He was the starting first baseman for the Wake Forest Demon Deacons during his college career, and was drafted 23rd overall by the San Diego Padres in the first round of the 2008 Major League Baseball draft.

== Early years ==
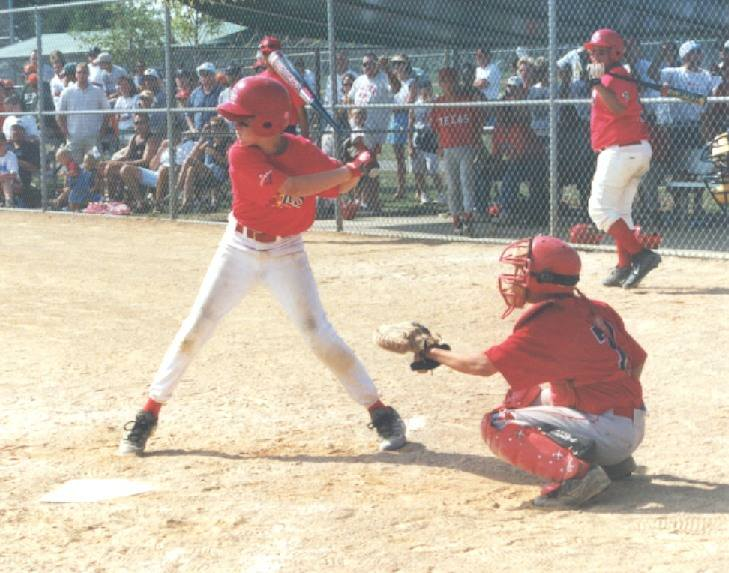
Allan Dykstra at bat in 1999 12U AAU championship game

He is not related to former Mets and Phillies player Lenny Dykstra. Dykstra was a member of the San Diego Stars 12U team that won 1999 AAU national championships. In 2001, he played for 14U team USA at the Pan-American games in Honduras.

He played for Sam Blalock at Rancho Bernardo High School where he helped take the team to the Palomar League Championship. He was selected to the 30 man trials for 18-and-under Junior National Team in 2004 and attended the Perfect Game Western Underclass Showcase where he was rated the number two prospect. In the 2005 Major League Baseball draft, Dykstra was drafted in the 34th round by the Boston Red Sox.

== College career ==
Dykstra played college baseball at Wake Forest University for coach Rick Rembielak while majoring in business. Dykstra won a multitude of awards in his freshman season including being named Atlantic Coast Conference (ACC) rookie of the year and named to the ACC all-academic team. Dykstra was named freshman All-American by rivals.com, Louisville Slugger, and Baseball America. He was selected to the Dick Howser Trophy watch list and the 2006 Pepsi Baseball Classic All-tournament team. Statistically, Dykstra led the team in slugging percentage, on-base percentage, RBIs, home runs, base on balls, sacrifice flies and tied for the lead in starts.

In 2007, Dykstra was named to the All-ACC academic team and second team All-ACC. He was named a Golden Spikes Award finalist along with being named to the midseason watch list for the Brooks Wallace Award. Dykstra tied for first in home runs, and ending in the top ten of base on balls, slugging percentage, on-base percentage, RBIs and total bases. In that same year, Dykstra helped lead Wake Forest Baseball to a 2007 NCAA Regional in Austin, Texas.

In 2006 and 2007, Dykstra played collegiate summer baseball with the Chatham A's of the Cape Cod Baseball League. He hit .308/.444/.481 for Chatham in 2007, and was eighth in the league in average, third in RBIs (31) and third in OBP. He made the CCBL All-Star team at designated hitter. Baseball America named him the No. 16 prospect in the Cape Cod League.

== Professional career ==
=== San Diego Padres ===
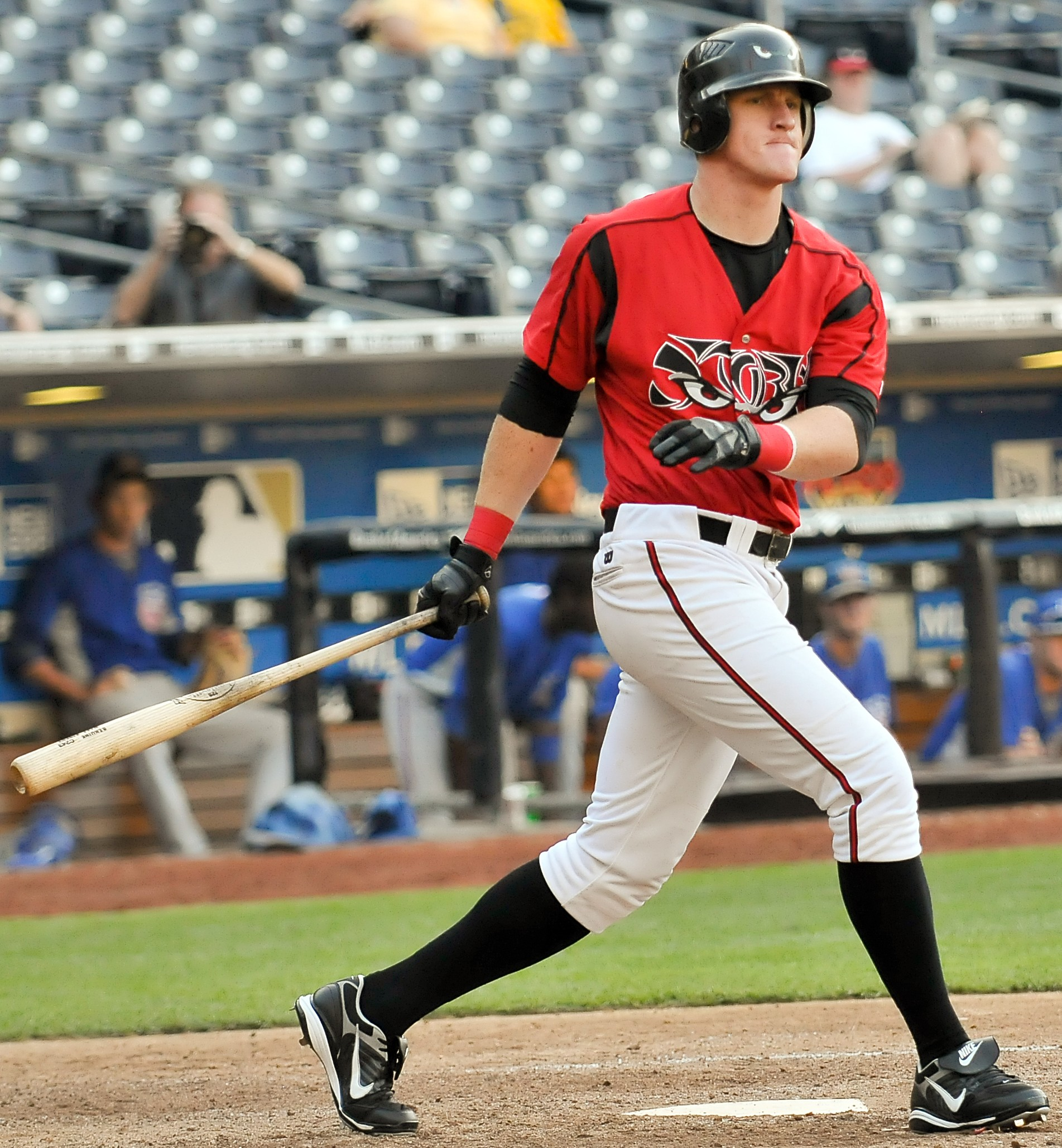
Dykstra batting for the Lake Elsinore Storm, San Diego Padres high-A affiliate, in 2008

Dykstra was drafted 23rd overall in the 2008 MLB Draft by the San Diego Padres. Dykstra signed a contract with the Padres on August 15, 2008, just before the deadline to sign draft picks.

=== New York Mets ===
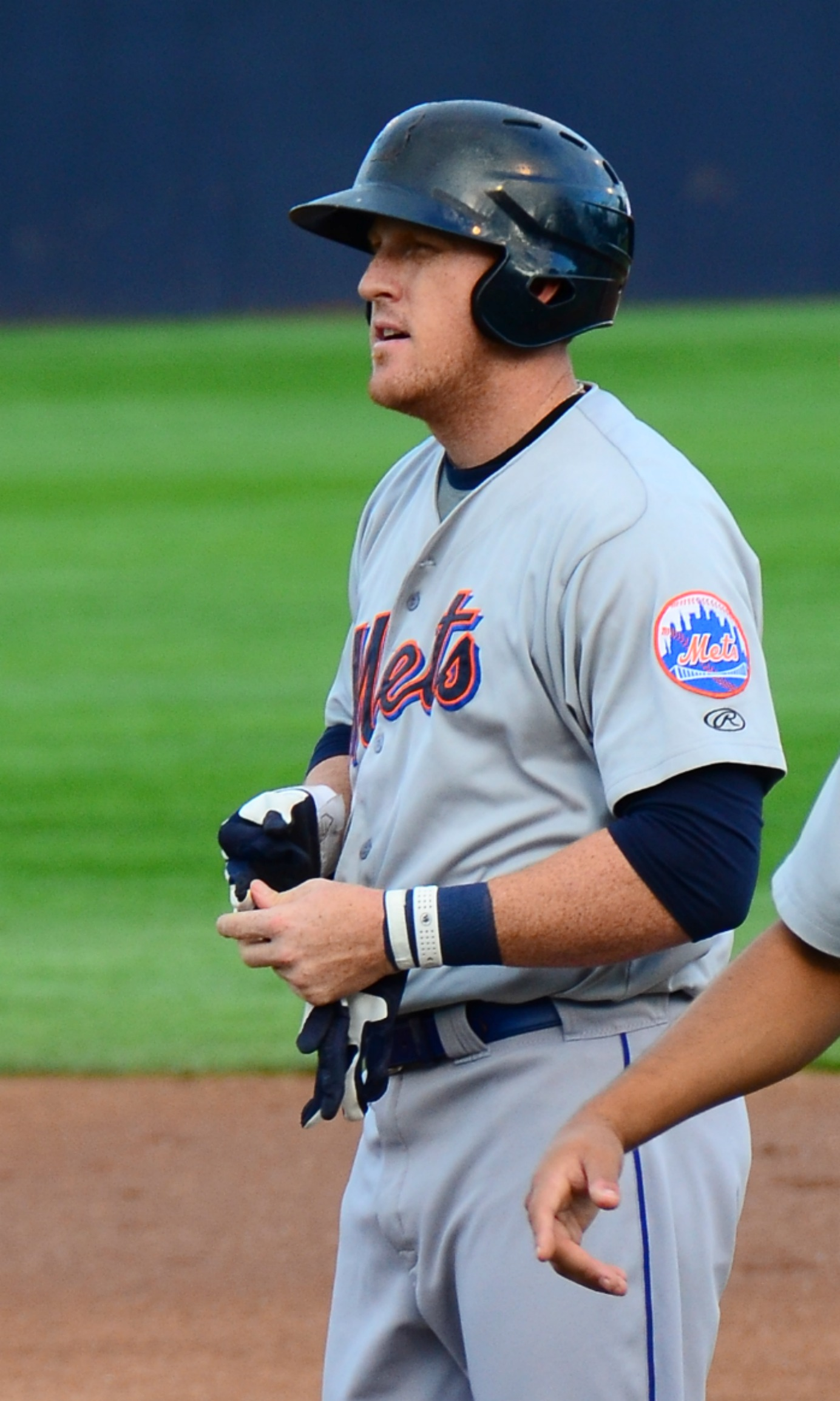
Dykstra during his tenure with the Binghamton Mets, New York Mets Double-A affiliate, in 2013

The Padres traded Dykstra to the New York Mets in exchange for RHP Eddie Kunz on March 29, 2011.

Dykstra was named the 2013 Eastern League Most Valuable Player after hitting .274 (102–372) with 22 doubles, 21 home runs, 82 RBIs and 56 runs scored. He led the EL in on-base percentage (.436), walks (102) and OPS (.938) and slugging percentage (.503). Dykstra was also tied for fifth in home runs and fourth in RBIs. His on-base percentage was the highest in the Eastern League since 2006 and his walk rate (21.1) was also the highest in the EL since 2006. He was selected to the Eastern League postseason All-Star team and was the starting first baseman for the EL All-Star Game on July 10.

At the conclusion of the season, Dykstra was named Sterling Minor League Organizational Co-Players of the Year (along with catcher Kevin Plawecki).

=== Tampa Bay Rays ===
After the 2014 season, Dykstra was granted free agency and signed with the Tampa Bay Rays.

Despite not making the Opening Day roster, Dykstra was called up to the big leagues for the first time on April 8, 2015, to replace injured James Loney. On April 17, with his father in the stands, Dykstra hit his first Major League home run, a three-run shot, off of Adam Warren of the New York Yankees. Dykstra was designated for assignment by the Rays on April 25. He was released by the organization on June 26.

=== Sugar Land Skeeters ===
On July 14, 2015, Dykstra signed with the Sugar Land Skeeters in the Atlantic League of Professional Baseball. In 16 appearances for Sugar Land, he batted .179/.333/.214 with no home runs and three RBI. Dykstra was released by the Skeeters on August 6, and later retired in the offseason.

== Personal life ==
Dykstra's younger brother, James, also plays professional baseball, and is currently a free agent.
