= Jerry Cram =

American baseball player (born 1947)

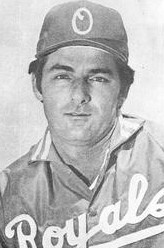
- Cram in 1980
- Pitcher
- Born: December 9, 1947 (age 78); Los Angeles, California, U.S.
- Batted: Right Threw: Right

MLB debut
- September 3, 1969, for the Kansas City Royals

Last MLB appearance
- September 27, 1976, for the Kansas City Royals

MLB statistics
- Win–loss record: 0–3
- Earned run average: 2.98
- Strikeouts: 22
- Stats at Baseball Reference

Teams
- Kansas City Royals (1969); New York Mets (1974–1975); Kansas City Royals (1976)

Gerald Allen Cram (born December 9, 1947) is an American former professional baseball pitcher and coach. Born in Los Angeles, California, Cram appeared in 23 games over parts of four seasons in Major League Baseball with the Kansas City Royals (1969, 1976) and New York Mets (1974–1975), compiling an 0–3 record and 2.98 earned run average. He threw and batted right-handed, and was listed as 6 feet (1.8 m) tall and 180 pounds (82 kg).

After attending Riverside Community College, he began his professional career in the Minnesota Twins organization in 1967. After his second year in pro ball—when Cram won 16 games in the Class A Carolina League—he was selected by the Royals with the 54th pick in the 1968 American League expansion draft. The 1969 Royals sent Cram to the minor leagues for most of the season (where he again won 16 games), and summoned him to Kansas City for his first MLB action in September. He appeared in five games, two as a starting pitcher, and although he lost his only decision to the Seattle Pilots, the league's other expansion team, on September 15, he allowed only four hits and one earned run in seven innings pitched. Overall, he posted a 3.24 ERA in 162/3 innings pitched. Cram then spent all of the next three years at Triple-A Omaha.

He was traded to the Mets in February 1973, and remained with Triple-A Tidewater for all of that campaign and most of 1974. Cram finally returned to the major leagues in August 1974 when he was added to the Mets' bullpen corps. Again, he lost his only decision (on August 28 to the Houston Astros), but on September 11, he performed admirably in what would become the second-longest game in MLB history, a 25-inning contest against the St. Louis Cardinals at Shea Stadium. Cram threw eight shutout innings (the 17th through the 24th), allowing seven hits, and left for a pinch hitter with the game still tied, three-all. The Cardinals broke through to win in the 25th frame.

Cram compiled a 1.61 ERA in ten appearances and 221/3 innings pitched for the 1974 Mets, and then made the 1975 club's early-season roster, but he was ineffective in two of his four appearances and was returned to Tidewater for the rest of the year. In January 1976, he was dealt back to Kansas City. Back with Omaha, he earned American Association All-Star honors in 1976, then capped his MLB career with four late-season mound stints with the American League Royals. All told, he dropped all of his three MLB decisions, but posted a solid 2.98 ERA in 481/3 innings of work, allowing 52 hits and 13 bases on balls, with 22 strikeouts.

He continued to pitch in professional baseball into 1981 with Triple-A Omaha as a playing coach, and overall won 107 games in a 15-year, 473-game minor league career. He turned to coaching full-time in 1982, and remained in the Royals' minor league system for 16 seasons, through 1997. He joined the Colorado Rockies' organization for three seasons (1998–2000), then spent 17 more years as a minor-league pitching coach for the San Francisco Giants' organization before his 2017 retirement, working with pitchers such as Tim Lincecum and Madison Bumgarner who would play key roles in the Giants' three World Series championships (2010, 2012 and 2014).

In retirement, he lives in Round Hill, Virginia.
