= James Dykstra =

American baseball player (born 1990)

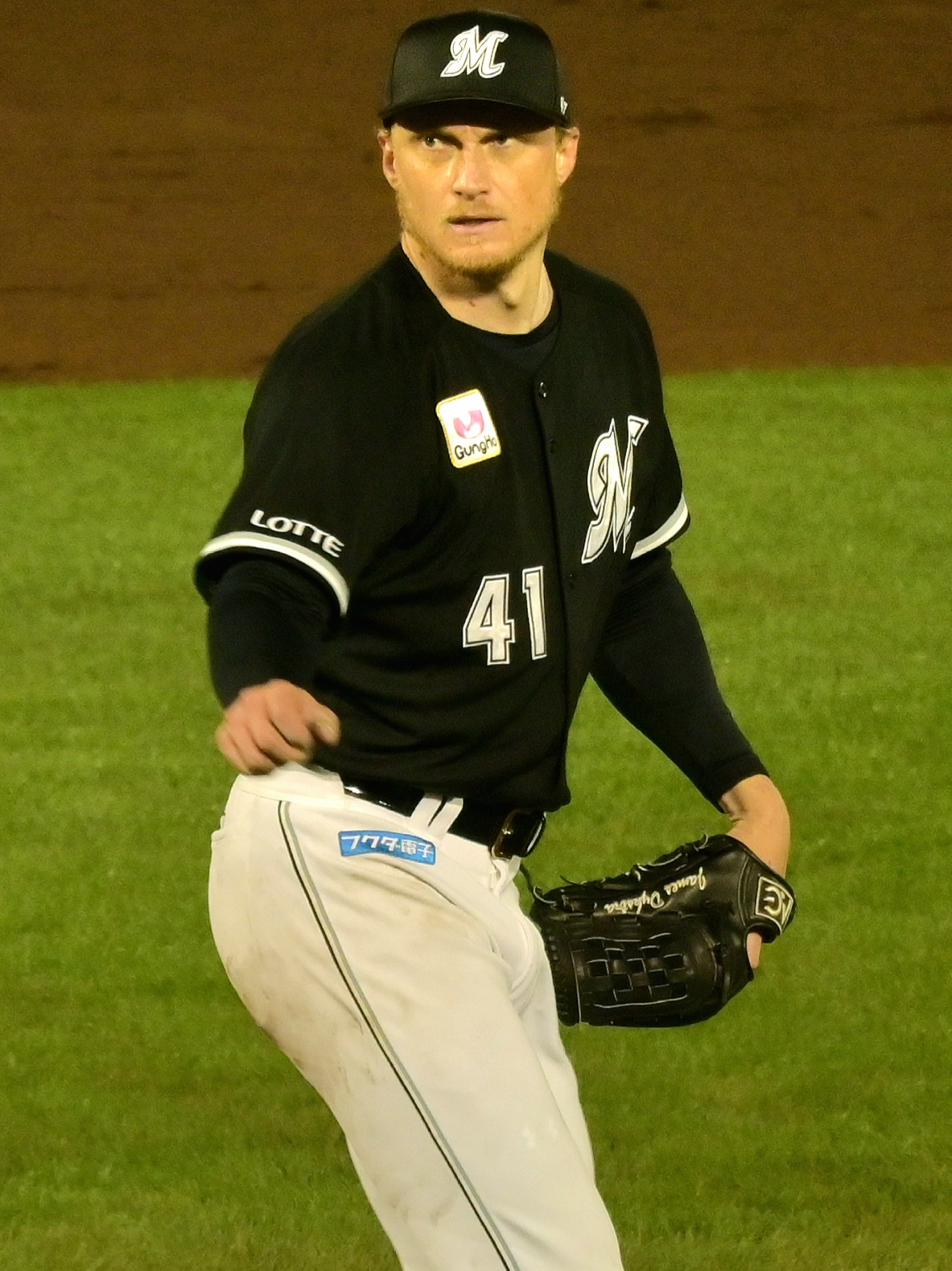
- Dykstra with the Chiba Lotte Marines in 2024
- Pitcher
- Born: November 22, 1990 (age 35); San Diego, California, U.S.
- Batted: Right Threw: Right

NPB debut
- April 4, 2024, for the Chiba Lotte Marines

Last NPB appearance
- May 3, 2024, for the Chiba Lotte Marines

NPB statistics
- Win–loss record: 1–0
- Earned run average: 1.64
- Strikeouts: 11

Teams
- Chiba Lotte Marines (2024)

James Andrew Dykstra (born November 22, 1990) is an American former professional baseball pitcher. He has previously played in Nippon Professional Baseball (NPB) for the Chiba Lotte Marines.

== Career ==
Dykstra was drafted by the Boston Red Sox in the 40th round of the 2009 MLB draft out of Rancho Bernardo High School, but did not sign and instead attended Yavapai College before transferring to Louisiana State University. He transferred to California State University, San Marcos in 2012, posting a 7–2 record and 2.89 ERA as a junior and a 7–4 record and 2.28 ERA as a senior.

=== Chicago White Sox ===
Dykstra was drafted by the Chicago White Sox in the sixth round, with the 183rd overall selection, of the 2013 Major League Baseball draft. He made his professional debut with the rookie–level Great Falls Voyagers, posting a 5.06 ERA in 6 games.

Dykstra split the 2014 season between the Single–A Kannapolis Intimidators and High–A Winston-Salem Dash, accumulating a 9–11 record and 3.43 ERA with 128 strikeouts across 25 combined starts. On April 15, 2015, while playing for Winston-Salem, Dykstra threw a seven–inning no-hitter. In 25 games (19 starts) for the Dash in 2015, he recorded a 7–10 record and 3.51 ERA with 87 strikeouts across 128 1/3 innings pitched.

Dykstra spent the 2016 season with the Double–A Birmingham Barons, making 28 appearances and pitching to a 4–9 record and 4.93 ERA with 66 strikeouts across 102 1/3 innings.

=== Texas Rangers ===
On December 16, 2016, Dykstra was traded to the Texas Rangers in exchange for cash considerations. He split the 2017 season between the Double–A Frisco RoughRiders and Triple–A Round Rock Express, making 29 combined appearances and logging a cumulative 2–10 record and 5.86 ERA with 70 strikeouts in 98 1/3 innings. Dykstra returned to Frisco to begin the following season, but struggled to a 14.85 ERA in 5 appearances prior to being released on April 23, 2018.

=== Sioux City Explorers ===
On April 30, 2018, Dykstra signed with the Sioux City Explorers of the American Association of Professional Baseball. In 19 starts, Dykstra posted a 9–4 record and 3.49 ERA with 84 strikeouts across 108 1/3 innings pitched.

=== Sugar Land Skeeters ===
On February 7, 2019, Dykstra's contract was purchased by the Cincinnati Reds. However, prior to the season on March 26, he was released by the Reds organization.

On April 15, 2019, Dykstra signed with the Sugar Land Skeeters of the Atlantic League of Professional Baseball. In 14 games for the Skeeters, he recorded a 3.75 ERA with 6 home runs across 12 innings pitched. Dykstra was released by Sugar Land on June 1.

=== Southern Maryland Blue Crabs ===
On June 4, 2019, Dykstra signed with the Southern Maryland Blue Crabs of the Atlantic League of Professional Baseball. In 39 appearances out of the bullpen, Dykstra posted a 3.28 ERA with 50 strikeouts and 2 saves across 46 2/3 innings pitched.

=== Toronto Blue Jays ===
On December 9, 2019, Dykstra's contract was purchased by the Toronto Blue Jays organization. He did not play in a game in 2020 due to the cancellation of the minor league season because of the COVID-19 pandemic. Dykstra elected free agency following the season on November 2, 2020.

On February 23, 2021, Dykstra re–signed with the Blue Jays organization on a minor league contract. He split the year between the rookie–level Florida Complex League Blue Jays, Single–A Dunedin Blue Jays, Double–A New Hampshire Fisher Cats, and Triple–A Buffalo Bisons. In 11 appearances split between the four affiliates, Dykstra logged a cumulative 4.76 ERA with 18 strikeouts across 11 1/3 innings of work. He elected free agency again following the season on November 7.

=== Guerreros de Oaxaca ===
On April 11, 2022, Dykstra signed with the Guerreros de Oaxaca of the Mexican League. In 17 games for Oaxaca, Dykstra struggled to a 7.27 ERA with 23 strikeouts and 5 saves in 17 1/3 innings.

=== Philadelphia Phillies ===
On July 4, 2022, Dykstra signed a minor league contract with the Philadelphia Phillies. In 6 appearances for the Triple–A Lehigh Valley IronPigs, he logged a 5.06 ERA with 4 strikeouts in 5 1/3 innings of work. Dykstra was released by the Phillies organization on August 4.

=== Southern Maryland Blue Crabs (second stint) ===
On August 16, 2022, Dykstra signed a deal to return to the Southern Maryland Blue Crabs of the Atlantic League of Professional Baseball. He logged 10 scoreless appearances down the stretch, striking out 20 batters in 11 innings.

In 2023, Dykstra made 21 appearances for Southern Maryland, registering a 5.40 ERA with 19 strikeouts and 3 saves across 21 2/3 innings pitched. He was released by the Blue Crabs on July 6, 2023.

=== Chiba Lotte Marines ===
On December 24, 2023, Dykstra signed with the Chiba Lotte Marines of Nippon Professional Baseball. He made 3 appearances for the main team in 2024, recording a 1.64 ERA with 11 strikeouts across 11 innings pitched. Dykstra was released by the Marines on July 24, 2024.

== Personal life ==
Dykstra's older brother, Allan, played in Major League Baseball for the Tampa Bay Rays.
