= Polish Hill (Kansas City, Kansas) =

Neighborhood in Kansas City, Kansas, United States

Coordinates: 39.098°N 94.631°W

Polish Hill is a neighborhood in Kansas City, Kansas, located southwest of Strawberry Hill, that was historically occupied by mixed Slavic and Eastern European immigrants.

== History ==
Polish Hill was mainly founded by immigrants from Poland in the late 1800s and early 1900s. They were mainly from Podkarpackie Voivodeship and migrants from the small township of Pulaskifield, Missouri who were also of Polish ancestry. The hill also had a small influx of Slovak immigrants, being so close to Podkarpackie. Together the Poles founded St. Joseph's Polish Catholic Parish at Vermont Avenue and Mill Street, on what became known as "Polish Hill". The community of people there was very large so the founding's of churches such as St. Benedict's and St. Casimir were founded by other Polish people to attend Mass. Sts. Cyril and Methodius was founded by the Slovak people and was also attended by more Poles. Many Eastern European immigrants in the area worked in local meatpacking plants.

The Slavic community slowly started drifting apart. St. Benedict, St. Joseph, Sts. Cyril and Methodius and St. Casimir all co-joined to create All Saints Catholic Parish in the former church of St. Joseph.

For over thirty years, the residents of Polish Hill have celebrated Polski Day with a parade and food festival during the first week of May each year to commemorate the signing of the Polish Constitution on May 3, 1791. Today, the community is mainly Hispanic, but continued the Polski Day tradition through 2019, resulting in Cinco de Mayo celebrations featuring kielbasa and sauerkraut.

Notable residents include World Series-winning St. Louis Cardinals pitcher Ray Sadecki, who attended St. Joseph's Polish Roman Catholic School, and whose grandparents ran a grocery store in Polish Hill. Sadecki once served as Grand Marshall for the neighborhood's Polski Day celebration.

== Location ==
Polish Hill is located north of Interstate 70 and west of 7th Street, centered at Vermont Avenue and Mill Street.
