= Ray Sadecki =

American baseball player (1940–2014)

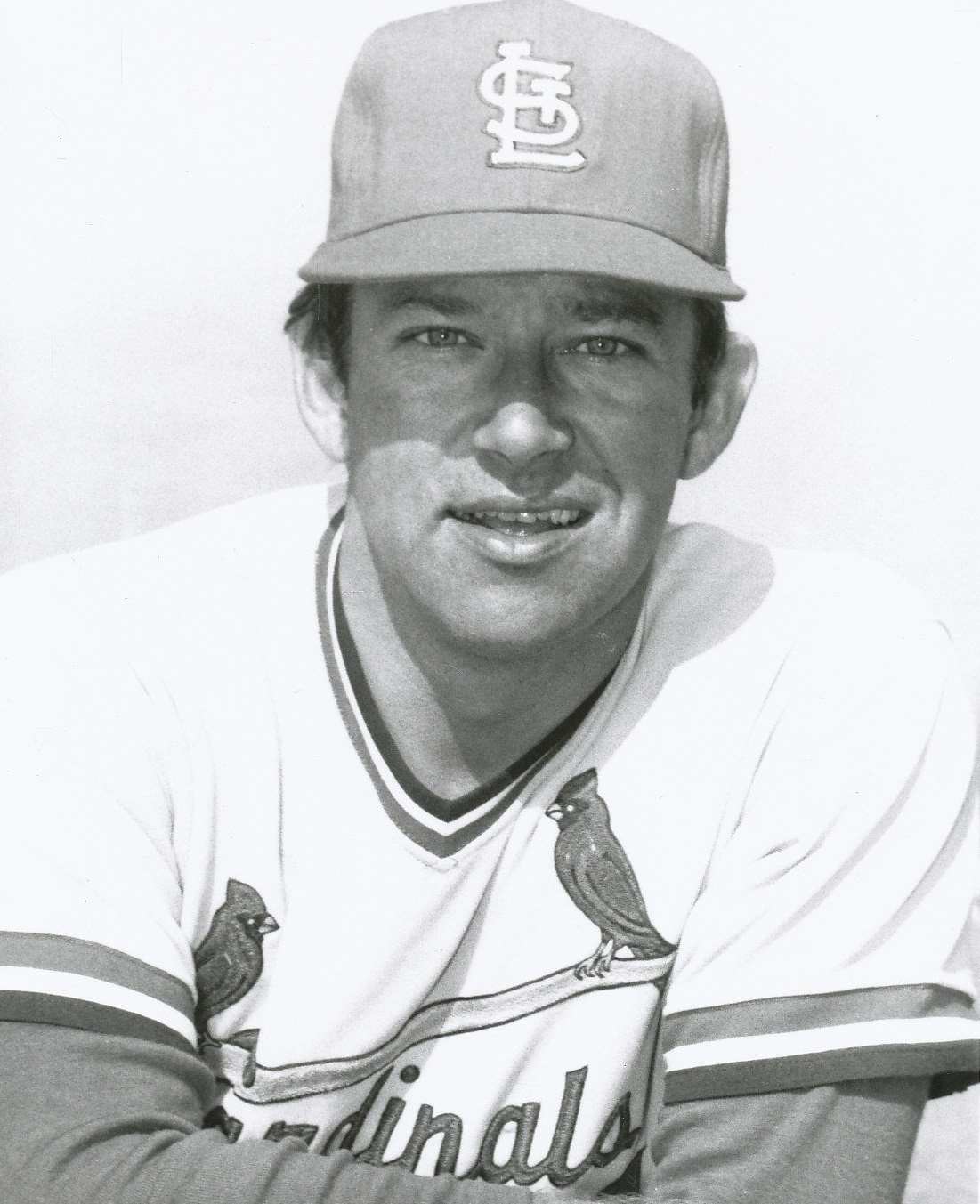
- Sadecki in 1975
- Pitcher
- Born: December 26, 1940; Kansas City, Kansas, U.S.
- Died: November 17, 2014 (aged 73); Mesa, Arizona, U.S.
- Batted: Left Threw: Left

MLB debut
- May 19, 1960, for the St. Louis Cardinals

Last MLB appearance
- April 23, 1977, for the New York Mets

MLB statistics
- Win–loss record: 135–131
- Earned run average: 3.78
- Strikeouts: 1,614
- Stats at Baseball Reference

Teams
- St. Louis Cardinals (1960–1966); San Francisco Giants (1966–1969); New York Mets (1970–1974); St. Louis Cardinals (1975); Atlanta Braves (1975); Kansas City Royals (1975–1976); Milwaukee Brewers (1976); New York Mets (1977)

Career highlights and awards
- World Series champion (1964)

Raymond Michael Sadecki (December 26, 1940 – November 17, 2014) was an American Major League Baseball pitcher. He is best remembered as the left-handed complement to Bob Gibson, who in 1964, won 20 games to lead the St. Louis Cardinals to their first World Series title in eighteen years. He was notable for throwing the palmball.

== Early years ==
Ray was born to Frank and Josephine Koska Sadecki in Polish Hill (Kansas City, Kansas). By the time he was a sophomore at Bishop Ward High School in Kansas City, Kansas, Sadecki was drawing major league scouts to his games. His senior year, after the Cyclones went 18–0, and won the state baseball championship, the "bonus baby" signed with the Cardinals while still only seventeen years old.

== Professional career ==
He compiled a 22–16 record, a 3.77 earned run average & 349 strikeouts over his first two seasons in the Cardinals' farm system. After six appearances with the Rochester Red Wings in 1960, in which he compiled a 1.76 ERA, Sadecki received a call up to the majors at just nineteen years old.

=== St. Louis Cardinals ===
He allowed five runs (2 earned), while lasting just 2 2/3 innings in his major league debut against the Pittsburgh Pirates to take the loss. His first career win was a shutout of the Cincinnati Reds on June 15, in which he scattered three hits while walking eight & striking out nine. Splitting his time between starts & relieving, he posted a 9–9 record, 3.78 ERA & 95 strikeouts over 157 1/3 innings pitched to earn Cardinal Rookie of the Year honors.

He became a full-time starting pitcher in 1961, and led his team with 222.2 innings pitched & fourteen wins (tied with Larry Jackson). He also proved to be one of the better hitting pitchers in the National League. In 87 at bats, Sadecki had 22 hits for a .253 batting average, and drove in twelve runs.

This early success did not carry over to 1962, however. After a contract holdout that had Sadecki enter Spring training late, he began the season in the bullpen, and earned his first career save against the expansion New York Mets on April 18. He was battered around by the Chicago Cubs in his first start four days later for his first loss of the season. He won his next start against the Reds, even though it wasn't an especially impressive performance (8 hits, 3 walks, 4 earned runs in 8+ innings. Exited in the 9th with the tying run on second. Lindy McDaniel came in for the save). Facing the Reds again a week later, Sadecki didn't even make it out of the first inning, surrendering five runs (4 earned) in 2/3 of an inning. A similarly poor performance against the Reds on June 5 placed Sadecki square in the crosshairs of manager Johnny Keane. He pitched well over the rest of June (3-1 record, all 3 wins were complete games), but the wheels came off in July (1-4, 6.94 ERA), and Sadecki was optioned to the International League's Atlanta Crackers for the remainder of the season.

Sadecki pitched well for the Crackers, going 7–1 with a 2.55 ERA in nine games. That performance, and a strong Spring earned Sadecki the number five slot in the Cards' rotation for 1963. He got off to a poor start (0-4, 6.80 ERA. The Cardinals were also 0–3 in his no-decisions), however, Keane stuck with him, and Sadecki reversed course. He won his next four starts, earning a save in between, and ending the season with an even 10–10 record.

==== 1964 season ====
Still only 23 years old at the start of the 1964 season, Sadecki's name came up several times during the off season in trade rumors. Prior to Ernie Broglio being included in the trade that brought Lou Brock to the Cardinals, the Cubs inquired about Sadecki, but were turned down by the Cards. He was also rumored to be heading to the San Francisco Giants for Felipe Alou, but that trade also never materialized.

Sadecki posted a 20–11 record and, along with Bob Gibson & Curt Simmons, helped pitch the Cardinals to their first pennant since 1946, with the Philadelphia Phillies and Cincinnati Reds finishing tied for second, one game behind the Redbirds. The Phillies had held a 6 1/2-game lead over the Reds and Cardinals on September 20 with 12 games to play, only to squander the pennant by losing ten consecutive games, while the Cardinals and Reds recorded winning streaks of eight and nine games, respectively. Sadecki won his 20th game on September 29 against the Phillies for Philadelphia's ninth consecutive loss and St. Louis' seventh consecutive win. The win also pulled the Cardinals even with the Reds who, after taking over first place on September 27, had their nine-game winning streak snapped by the Pirates on Bob Friend's 2–0 shutout earlier in the day. The next day, the Cardinals took over first place by defeating the Phillies while the Reds were again shut out by the Pirates.

The Cardinals, ahead by a half-game over the Reds entering the final weekend, now appeared to have the pennant put away: their final three games were at home against the lowly New York Mets, while the Phillies and Reds were to play a two-game series at Crosley Field. However, the Cardinals lost the first two games of the series, first with Al Jackson outdueling Gibson 1–0 (that same day, the Phillies spotted the Reds a 3–0 lead, then scored four runs in the eighth inning to win 4–3 and finally snap their 10-game losing streak), then Sadecki getting battered in one inning, giving up five runs in a 15–5 loss. The Cardinals won the pennant on the final day, defeating the Mets 11–5, while the Phillies hammered the Reds 10–0.

After unexpectedly winning the pennant, the Cardinals defeated the New York Yankees in the World Series. Sadecki started Game One, and gave up three runs in the second inning, but settled down after that and defeated the Yankees 9–5, in what would be Whitey Ford's final World Series game. Starting Game Four, Sadecki was again battered early, this time being pulled after giving up three runs in 1/3 of an inning. The Cardinals, however, came back to win 4–3, the runs coming on Ken Boyer's sixth-inning grand slam. The Cardinals went on to win the Series, with Gibson winning Games Five and Seven.

==== Later years ====
As well as 1964 went for Sadecki, 1965 went poorly. He began the season 0–4 with an 8.20 ERA. On June 6, Sadecki failed to get out of the first inning for third time of the season already. He ended the season with a 6–15 mark, and his ERA skyrocketed to 5.21.

Sadecki pitched one inning of the second game of the 1966 season, and struck out the side. After a second successful relief appearance, he made two successful starts to see his record stand at 2–0 with a 0.98 ERA before facing the Mets on May 4. Ron Swoboda hit a first inning three run home run, and the Mets tacked on three more before chasing him in the seventh for his first loss of the season. Four days later, he was traded to the San Francisco Giants for Orlando Cepeda.

=== San Francisco Giants ===
Sadecki's career in San Francisco got off to a rocky start. He lost his first two decisions with a 7.43 ERA. His record as a Giant in 1966 was 3–7 with a 5.40 ERA. Cepeda, meanwhile, batted .303 with a team leading 17 home runs, despite only playing half a season with the Cards. In 1967, the Cardinals won the World Series. Cepeda was named the National League MVP, with a league leading 111 RBIs to lead his team to the Fall Classic. Sadecki improved to 12–6 with a career-best 2.78 ERA in 1967, but given Cepeda's emergence in St. Louis, Sadecki became a target for Giants fans.

Sadecki started the 1968 season with two shutouts in his first four starts. He also pitched a third complete game in which he did not allow an earned run, however, a ninth inning error by Willie McCovey (Cepeda's replacement at first base for the Giants) led to four unearned runs, and Sadecki's first loss of the season.

Hard luck seemed to be a pattern for Sadecki in 1968. Despite a career best 2.91 ERA, his record was 12–18, the 18 losses tying him with Claude Osteen for the major league lead. In 1969, he again started the season with two shutouts, but after going 0–4 with a 6.04 ERA in May, Sadecki's role diminished to reliever and spot starter. After ending the season at 5–8 with a 4.23 ERA, he was dealt from the Giants to the New York Mets for Bob Heise and Jim Gosger on December 12, 1969.

=== New York Mets ===
Despite joining an organization that had reigning Cy Young Award winner Tom Seaver, Jerry Koosman, Gary Gentry & Nolan Ryan, Sadecki made twelve starts for the Mets by the All-Star break in 1970, and was 7–3 with a 3.38 ERA. Regardless, his role shifted after the break; he became more of a spot starter & relief pitcher.

At first, the new role did not suit Sadecki (7.20 ERA as a reliever vs. 3.64 as a starter in 1970). Manager Gil Hodges kept him in this role for the 1971 season, and he seemed to adapt (3.13 ERA as a reliever during the first half of the season) until a mid-season injury to Koosman created a need for a lefty starter in the rotation. His first two starts in July were complete games in which he did not allow an earned run, including a 5–2 victory over his former franchise, the Cardinals, in which Sadecki drove in a run & scored in the Mets' five run second off Steve Carlton. The hard luck that haunted Sadecki in 1968 seemed to return in 1971, though to a lesser degree. His record was only 7-7 despite a stellar 2.92 ERA.

With the emergence of rookie phenom Jon Matlack in 1972, Sadecki became a full-time reliever. His role seemed to diminish further in 1973; all fourteen relief appearances to start the season came in losses in which the Mets were already down by a substantial number of runs. Regardless of his "Mop up duty" role, Sadecki pitched well (3.05 ERA). He stepped into Jim McAndrew's spot in the rotation for the second half of the season with moderate success (4-4, 4.16 ERA), but it was when he returned to the bullpen in September that Sadecki made his mark with Mets fans. When the Mets faced the Pirates in five crucial games that would determine the National League East, Sadecki made three appearances, in which he did not allow a run in eight innings pitched. He pitched four scoreless innings, and was the winning pitcher in the thirteen inning marathon that featured the famous "Ball on the wall" play.

After not making an appearance in the 1973 National League Championship Series against the Reds, Sadecki pitched four of the seven games of the 1973 World Series against the Oakland Athletics, gaining the save in game four. The only run he allowed was in the seventh game. Bert Campaneris led off the fifth with a single, and advanced to second on a Cleon Jones error. Joe Rudi followed with a single that brought Campaneras home with the A's fifth run of their 5–2 victory. Sadecki kept this role for one more season with the Mets.

=== Later years and retirement ===
Sadecki returned to the Cardinals when the Mets traded him and Tommy Moore for Joe Torre on October 13, 1974. His second tour of duty with the Cardinals did not last long. He appeared in only eight games, then he was traded. On May 28, 1975, Sadecki and Elias Sosa were dealt to the Atlanta Braves for Ron Reed and a player to be named later. At the end of the season, he was the player to be named later in an earlier deal between the Braves and the Kansas City Royals.

He made three appearances for the Royals in 1976. Though he did not allow an earned run, in his third appearance he failed to convert a save against the New York Yankees, which led to a loss. Shortly afterward, he was released and he was signed as a Free agent by the Milwaukee Brewers. He finished out the season in the Brewers' bullpen, where he was 2–0 with a 4.34 ERA and one save. After the season, he re-signed with the Mets, but after just four appearances he was released in May 1977.

== Career stats ==
Seasons	W	L	PCT	ERA	G	GS	CG	SHO	SV	IP	BF	H	ER	R	HR	BAA	K	BB	BB/9	WP	HBP	Fld%	Avg.	SH
18	135	131	.508	3.78	563	328	85	20	7	2500.1	10694	2456	1051	1206	240	.258	1614	922	3.3	94	41	.878	.191	54

Sadecki hit his first career home run off Hall of Famer Gaylord Perry on June 9, 1962. His best season with the bat was 1966, when he batted .341 with three home runs and seven RBIs. He hit 5 career home runs with 56 RBI.

Sadecki was the only pitcher to surrender more than one home run to Bob Uecker, who hit just 14 over his six-year career before becoming a Ford C. Frick Award-winning broadcaster.

== Personal life ==
When Catholic Charities of Kansas City and the Baseball Tomorrow Fund renovated a baseball field in 2002, it was dedicated and renamed Ray Sadecki Field in honor of the neighborhood native. It stands at 9th and Homer Streets in Kansas City, Kansas.

On June 11, 2007, Sadecki was inducted into The National Polish-American Sports Hall of Fame.

Sadecki died from complications of blood cancer on November 17, 2014.
