= Barry Foote =

American baseball player (born 1952)

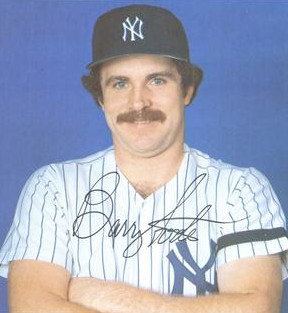
- Foote in 1981
- Catcher
- Born: February 16, 1952 (age 74); Smithfield, North Carolina, U.S.
- Batted: Right Threw: Right

MLB debut
- September 14, 1973, for the Montreal Expos

Last MLB appearance
- August 8, 1982, for the New York Yankees

MLB statistics
- Batting average: .230
- Home runs: 57
- Runs batted in: 230
- Stats at Baseball Reference

Teams
- As player: Montreal Expos (1973–1977); Philadelphia Phillies (1977–1978); Chicago Cubs (1979–1981); New York Yankees (1981–1982); As coach: Chicago White Sox (1990–1991); New York Mets (1992–1993)

Barry Clifton Foote (born February 16, 1952) is an American former professional baseball player, scout, coach, and minor league manager. He played as a catcher in Major League Baseball (MLB) for the Montreal Expos (1973–1977), Philadelphia Phillies (1977–1978), Chicago Cubs (1979–1981), and New York Yankees (1981–1982). Although he was highly regarded as a younger player, he suffered numerous injuries and played most of his baseball career as a reserve player.

== Major League career ==
Foote (pronounced Foot) was born in Smithfield, North Carolina where he attended Smithfield-Selma High School. He was drafted by the Montreal Expos as the third overall pick in the first round of the 1970 Major League Baseball draft held on June 4, 1970. While playing for the Expos' minor league affiliate, the Quebec Carnavals in 1972, Foote was selected as the catcher for the Eastern League All-Star team.

Foote made his major league debut with the Expos on September 14, 1973 at the age of 21. He was highly regarded as a rookie by then-Expos manager Gene Mauch, who called him, "The next Johnny Bench". Foote replaced John Boccabella as the Expos catcher in 1974, and seemed to bear out Mauch's prediction for greatness, when he hit for a .262 batting average along with 11 home runs, 60 runs batted in, a .414 slugging percentage and a league-leading 12 sacrifice flies in 125 games. He also led National League catchers with 83 assists. Foote was named to the 1974 Topps All-Star Rookie Team.

As a measure of how highly regarded Foote was as a catcher, in 1975, the Expos shifted future Hall of Fame catcher Gary Carter to right field. Foote's performance suffered in his sophomore year of 1975, as his batting average fell dramatically to .195 in 118 games. In September, Foote suffered a torn cartilage and underwent knee surgery after the season ended. In 1976, he split catching duties with Gary Carter and by the 1977 season, Carter had replaced Foote as the Expos' starting catcher.

On June 15, 1977, the Expos traded Foote along with Dan Warthen to the Philadelphia Phillies for Wayne Twitchell and Tim Blackwell. Foote served as the Phillies back up catcher behind Bob Boone and Tim McCarver as they went on to win the 1978 National League Eastern Division title before losing to the Los Angeles Dodgers in the 1978 National League Championship Series. He appeared in only one game of the series as a pinch hitter, striking out in his only at bat.

Foote was then traded to the Chicago Cubs for catcher Dave Rader in 1979. The Cubs immediately made Foote their starting catcher. He was the Cubs' catcher in a memorable game at Wrigley Field on May 17, 1979 when his former team, the Phillies, defeated the Cubs by a score of 23 to 22. He ended the 1979 season having played in a career-high 132 games and hit 16 home runs, also a career high. On April 22, 1980, during a game against the St. Louis Cardinals at Wrigley Field, Foote had eight runs batted in, including a game-winning grand slam home run. A back injury curtailed Foote's playing time in 1980 and, he appeared in only 63 games.

The New York Yankees traded Tom Filer for Foote on April 27, 1981 to fill the gap left by injured catcher, Rick Cerone. Foote hit a home run in his first at bat for the Yankees and hit five home runs in his first seven games with the team. The 1981 season was then halted when the Major League Baseball Players Association voted unanimously to strike on May 29. The season resumed on August 9 after the All-Star game, but Foote was used sparingly for the remainder of the season. He played in the 1981 World Series for the Yankees, but struck out in his only at-bat. Foote went on the injured reserve list in June 1982 after suffering back spasms. He was assigned to the Columbus Clippers in July 1982 to make room on the roster when Rick Cerone returned from an injury. Foote played in his final major league game on August 8, 1982 at the age of 30. On March 25, 1983, he was released by the New York Yankees on the last day of spring training.

== Career statistics ==
In a ten-year major league career, Foote played in 687 games, accumulating 489 hits in 2,127 at bats for a .230 career batting average along with 57 home runs and 230 runs batted in. As a catcher, he had a .986 career fielding percentage. Former all-time leader in career stolen bases, Lou Brock, considered Foote one of the toughest catchers on which to attempt a steal of second base.

== Coaching career ==
Following his playing career, Foote signed a four-year contract with the Yankees to work as a scout. He later became a manager in the Yankees and the Blue Jays organizations. Foote was named Manager of the Year with the Fort Lauderdale Yankees of the Florida State League in 1984, and Manager of the Year with the Myrtle Beach Blue Jays of the South Atlantic League in 1987. Both teams won their respective league championships. Foote also served as a coach for the Chicago White Sox in 1990 and 1991 and the New York Mets in 1992 and 1993.

== Business career ==
He left baseball in 1993 to pursue business interests, including an oil and gas venture in Alaska and water treatment in California. He stayed active in youth sports.
