= Don Carrithers =

American baseball player (born 1949)

- Pitcher
- Born: September 15, 1949 (age 76); Lynwood, California, U.S.
- Batted: Right Threw: Right

MLB debut
- August 1, 1970, for the San Francisco Giants

Last MLB appearance
- September 27, 1977, for the Minnesota Twins

MLB statistics
- Win–loss record: 28–32
- Earned run average: 4.45
- Strikeouts: 275
- Stats at Baseball Reference

Teams
- San Francisco Giants (1970–1973); Montreal Expos (1974–1976); Minnesota Twins (1977)

Donald George Carrithers (born September 15, 1949) is an American former professional baseball player. He played in Major League Baseball as a right-handed pitcher from 1970 to 1977 for the San Francisco Giants, Montreal Expos and the Minnesota Twins.

== Career ==
Carrithers was drafted out of Lynwood High School in Lynwood, California in the 3rd round of the 1967 Major League Baseball draft by the San Francisco Giants. After working his way up through their farm system, he made his major league debut at the age of 20 in 1970, pitching 11 games with an earned run average (ERA) of 7.36. Carrithers started the 1971 season back in the minors, but was called up in June and was in the majors for good.

Over the next three seasons, Carrithers bounced back and forth between the starting rotation and the bullpen for the Giants, but various injuries limited him to no more than 25 appearances in each season. On May 14, 1972, he gave up Willie Mays's 647th career home run. His performance was below average in each season as well, and just before the 1974 season, the Giants traded him to the Montreal Expos in return for catcher John Boccabella.

Carrithers met with more success in Montreal, but injuries still hampered him. After two seasons of performing well in limited action, in 1976 Carrithers stayed healthy enough to throw 140 innings, his career high. However, his performance suffered a setback, as he went only 6–12 with an ERA of 4.43. The Expos became the second team to be frustrated by Carrithers, and they sold his contract to the Minnesota Twins the following spring.

After having made two appearances with the Twins in April 1977, Carrithers was driving a Volkswagen van with Twins teammate Mike Pazik as a passenger when, coming off Interstate 494 in Bloomington, MN, a young Ohio woman mistakenly got on the freeway via the exit ramp. Both men were seriously injured in the resulting crash. Pazik suffered two broken legs and never pitched again in the majors. Carrithers was out until late July of that year, coming back to pitch 5 more games in the season.

After 1977's campaign in which he made it into only 7 games, and a litany of injuries over the years, Carrithers' major league career was over at the age of 28. He returned to the Giants in 1978, pitching for their top farm team, the Phoenix Giants, for whom he'd pitched from 1969 to 1971, to end his professional baseball career.
