= Jim Cox (baseball) =

American baseball player (born 1950)

- Second baseman
- Born: May 28, 1950 (age 76); Bloomington, Illinois, U.S.
- Batted: Right Threw: Right

MLB debut
- July 19, 1973, for the Montreal Expos

Last MLB appearance
- July 6, 1976, for the Montreal Expos

MLB statistics
- Batting average: .215
- Home runs: 3
- Runs batted in: 33
- Stats at Baseball Reference

Teams
- Montreal Expos (1973–1976)

James Charles Cox (born May 28, 1950) is an American former backup second baseman in Major League Baseball who played for the Montreal Expos between 1973 and 1976. He batted and threw right-handed.

In a four-season career, Cox was a .215 hitter (66-for-307) with three home runs and 33 RBI in 110 games played, including 33 runs, 11 doubles, two triples and three stolen bases.
