= Hank Webb =

American baseball player (born 1950)

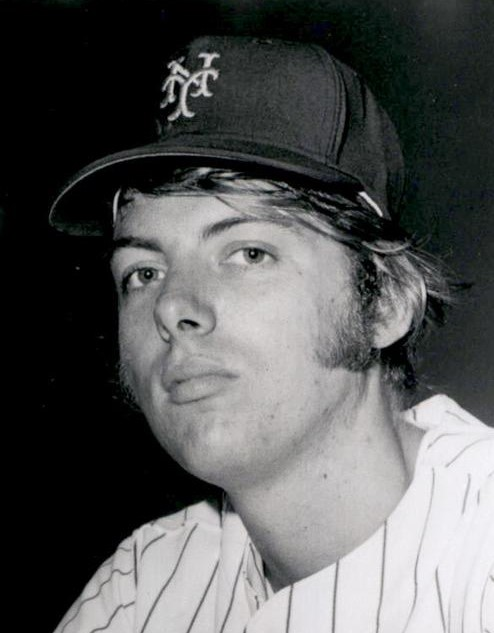
- Pitcher
- Born: May 21, 1950 (age 76); Copiague, New York, U.S.
- Batted: Right Threw: Right

MLB debut
- September 5, 1972, for the New York Mets

Last MLB appearance
- October 2, 1977, for the Los Angeles Dodgers

MLB statistics
- Win–loss record: 7–9
- Earned run average: 4.31
- Strikeouts: 71
- Stats at Baseball Reference

Teams
- New York Mets (1972–1976); Los Angeles Dodgers (1977)

Henry Gaylon Matthew Webb (born May 21, 1950) is an American former pitcher in Major League Baseball who played from 1972 to 1977 for the New York Mets and Los Angeles Dodgers.

Webb was the losing pitcher in the longest game played to a decision in National League history. On September 11, 1974, Webb pitched the 25th inning of the Mets' loss to the St. Louis Cardinals. Webb was charged with the only error of his major league career when his wild pickoff throw allowed Bake McBride to score all the way from first base to give St. Louis the victory. It was the first decision of Webb's major league career.

Webb pitched a seven inning, 1–0 no hit victory for the Tidewater Tides of the International League on June 7, 1974.

He is the father of three sons, Kevin, Kyle and former Major League pitcher Ryan Webb.
