= Teddy Martínez =

Dominican baseball player (born 1947)

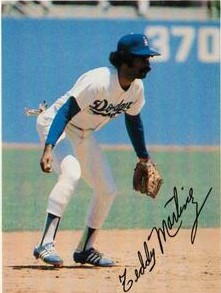
- Infielder
- Born: December 10, 1947 (age 78); Barahona, Dominican Republic
- Batted: Right Threw: Right

MLB debut
- July 18, 1970, for the New York Mets

Last MLB appearance
- September 30, 1979, for the Los Angeles Dodgers

MLB statistics
- Batting average: .240
- Home runs: 7
- Runs batted in: 108
- Stats at Baseball Reference

Teams
- New York Mets (1970–1974); St. Louis Cardinals (1975); Oakland Athletics (1975); Los Angeles Dodgers (1977–1979)

Teodoro Noel Martínez Encarnación (born December 10, 1947) is a Dominican former professional baseball infielder. He played in Major League Baseball (MLB) for the New York Mets, St. Louis Cardinals, Oakland Athletics, and Los Angeles Dodgers for nine seasons.

== Career ==
He helped the Mets win the 1973 National League pennant, the Athletics (baseball) win the 1975 American League West and the Dodgers win the 1977 and 1978 National League pennants.

In 9 seasons he played in 657 games and had 1,480 at-bats, 165 runs, 355 hits, 50 doubles, 16 triples, 7 home runs, 108 RBI, 29 stolen Bases, 55 walks (12 intentional), .240 batting average, .270 on-base percentage, .309 slugging percentage, 458 total bases, 25 sacrifice hits, and 6 sacrifice flies. Defensively, he finished with an overall .968 fielding percentage.

== Sources ==
- Career statistics from Baseball Reference · Baseball Reference (Minors) · Retrosheet · Baseball Almanac
