= Terry Enyart =

American baseball player (1950–2007)

- Pitcher
- Born: October 10, 1950; Ironton, Ohio, U.S.
- Died: February 15, 2007 (aged 56); Zephyrhills, Florida, U.S.
- Batted: Right Threw: Left

MLB debut
- June 17, 1974, for the Montreal Expos

Last MLB appearance
- July 5, 1974, for the Montreal Expos

MLB statistics
- Win–loss record: 0–0
- Earned run average: 16.20
- Strikeouts: 2
- Stats at Baseball Reference

Teams
- Montreal Expos (1974)

Terry Gene Enyart (October 10, 1950 – February 15, 2007) was an American professional baseball pitcher who appeared in two games for the 1974 Montreal Expos.

On February 15, 2007, Enyart struck his wife, shot his son in the hand, and committed suicide via self-inflicted gunshot wound to his head. He was 56 years old.
