= Eddie Kunz =

American baseball player (born 1986)

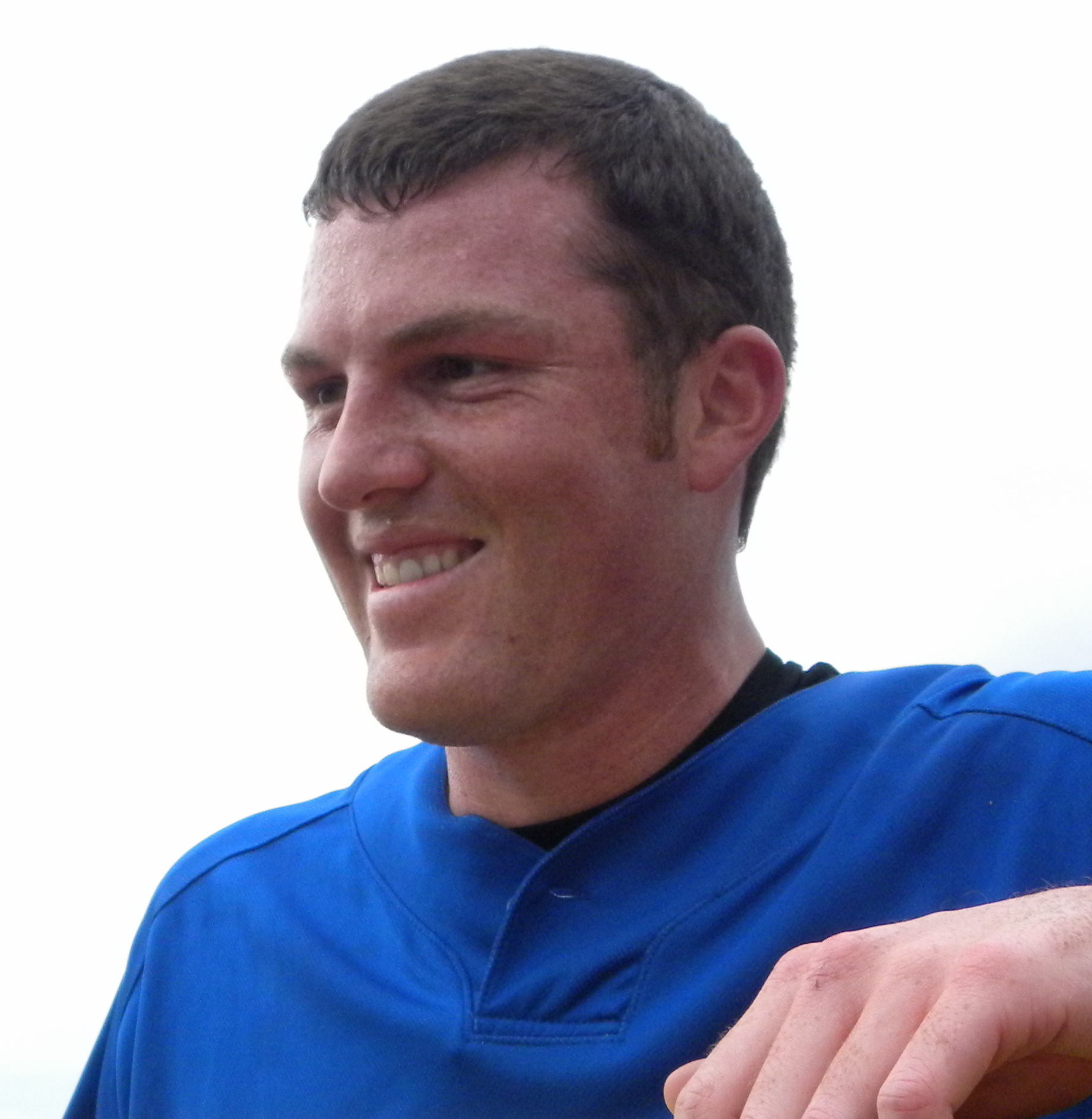
- Kunz in 2010
- Pitcher
- Born: April 8, 1986 (age 39); Portland, Oregon, U.S.
- Batted: Right Threw: Right

MLB debut
- August 3, 2008, for the New York Mets

Last MLB appearance
- August 16, 2008, for the New York Mets

MLB statistics
- Win–loss record: 0–0
- Earned run average: 13.50
- Strikeouts: 1
- Stats at Baseball Reference

Teams
- New York Mets (2008)

Edward Cory Kunz (born April 8, 1986) is an American former professional baseball pitcher. He played in Major League Baseball (MLB) for the New York Mets.

== Early life and amateur career ==
Kunz was born in Portland, Oregon. He attended Parkrose High School, where he played football, basketball, and baseball. In 2006, he played collegiate summer baseball with the Falmouth Commodores of the Cape Cod Baseball League and was named a league all-star. He was a preseason All-American second-team in 2007 for the Oregon State Beavers.

== Professional career ==
=== New York Mets ===
On August 24, 2007, the New York Mets signed Kunz after they selected him 42nd overall in the 2007 Major League Baseball draft. Less than a year later, on August 3, 2008, he was called up to the Major Leagues from the Double-A affiliate, Binghamton Mets, after having a 2.79 ERA with 27 saves in 44 games.

That day, in his Major League debut, he pitched a scoreless seventh inning. However, two weeks later, after struggling and the Mets' trade for Luis Ayala, he was demoted back to the minors.

On November 5, 2010, Kunz was sent down to the minors to Triple-A Buffalo along with Jesús Feliciano and Raul Valdes. Along with them were Mike Hessman and Omir Santos who then became free-agents after refusing their minor league assignment.

=== San Diego Padres ===
On March 29, 2011, Kunz was traded by the Mets to the Padres at the end of spring training for minor league first baseman Allan Dykstra.

On March 20, 2013, Kunz was released by the Padres.
