= Don DeMola =

American baseball player (born 1952)

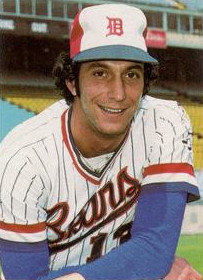
- DeMola in 1978
- Pitcher
- Born: July 5, 1952 (age 73); Glen Cove, New York, U.S.
- Batted: Right Threw: Right

MLB debut
- April 13, 1974, for the Montreal Expos

Last MLB appearance
- September 28, 1975, for the Montreal Expos

MLB statistics
- Win–loss record: 5–7
- Earned run average: 3.77
- Strikeouts: 110
- Stats at Baseball Reference

Teams
- Montreal Expos (1974–1975)

Donald John DeMola (born July 5, 1952) is an American former professional baseball pitcher. DeMola played for the Montreal Expos of Major League Baseball in 1974 and 1975.

DeMola pitched at Commack High School South in Commack, New York. He was drafted out of high school by the New York Yankees in the seventh round of the 1970 Major League Baseball draft. At the time, he told Newsday he was glad to be taken by the Yankees because "Ever since I was a little kid I wanted to be a Yankee." He ultimately chose to sign with the Yankees instead of playing college baseball at Saint Leo University.

DeMola only reached Single-A in two seasons with the Yankees before being released outright at 19 years old. He later said he thought he was cut because of the 1972 Major League Baseball strike, during which time the Yankees made budget cuts. He spent the following season in an auto body shop back in Commack replacing windshields but "couldn't stop thinking about baseball." He reached out to his former high school coach who arranged a tryout with a Montreal Expos scout and gave him a month to prepare. DeMola impressed in that tryout and received a minor league contract with the Expos. Upon signing with the Expos, he told The Palm Beach Post that he resolved to make the big leagues by the time he was 22 years old. He made his Major League debut in April 1974, three months before his twenty-second birthday.

He played through elbow pain during the 1975 season and, by the time he came back for spring training in 1976, he required surgery. He told the Montreal Gazette the surgeons "took enough calcium out of the elbow to lay down the baselines." The following year, he sprained his foot and ankle on the first day of spring training. In May of that year, he broke a knuckle punching teammate Chip Lang in the head during a fight and required another surgery. According to Lang, DeMola took the blame for the altercation but both players were suspended nonetheless.

He continued to pitch in the Expos minor league system through 1978, but was never able to return to the Major League level. He broke camp with the Rochester Red Wings in April 1979 but opted to retire. He asked to come off the retired list before the 1980 season, was sent a contract by the Red Wings but did not sign.
