= John Boccabella =

American baseball player (born 1941)

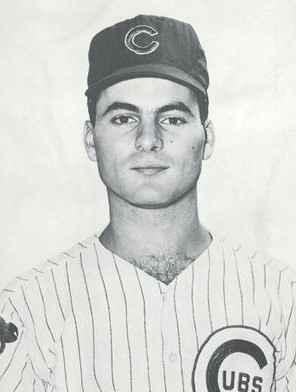
- Catcher / First baseman
- Born: June 29, 1941 (age 85); San Francisco, California, U.S.
- Batted: Right Threw: Right

MLB debut
- September 2, 1963, for the Chicago Cubs

Last MLB appearance
- September 19, 1974, for the San Francisco Giants

MLB statistics
- Batting average: .219
- Home runs: 26
- Runs batted in: 148
- Stats at Baseball Reference

Teams
- Chicago Cubs (1963–1968); Montreal Expos (1969–1973); San Francisco Giants (1974)

John Dominic Boccabella (born June 29, 1941) is an American former professional baseball player. He played as a catcher and first baseman in Major League Baseball from 1963 to 1974 with the Chicago Cubs, Montreal Expos and San Francisco Giants.

== Early career ==
Born in San Francisco, California to Italian immigrant parents, Boccabella grew up in San Anselmo where he attended Marin Catholic High School. He attended college at the University of Santa Clara where, he was a member of the Santa Clara Broncos baseball team that made it to the final of the 1962 College World Series before losing to the Michigan Wolverines baseball team.

After graduating with an honors degree in commerce, he was signed by the Chicago Cubs before the start of the 1963 season and assigned to the Pocatello Chiefs, a Cubs farm team in the Pioneer League. Boccabella had an impressive first season in professional baseball, posting a .365 batting average along with 30 home runs and 92 RBIs in just 84 games with the Chiefs.

== Major League career ==
His performance earned him a promotion to the major leagues where he made his debut as a first baseman with the Cubs on September 2, 1963 at the age of 22. Despite hailing from San Francisco, the Cubs' radio announcers dubbed him "Boccabella from 'Pocatella'". In 1966, Cubs manager, Leo Durocher made the decision to convert Boccabella into a catcher to serve as a backup for Randy Hundley.

Boccabella was drafted from the Cubs by the Montreal Expos in the 1968 expansion draft. He served as a utility player until 1973 when he became the Expos' primary catcher. He set new personal career highs in 1973 in games played (118), plate appearances (442), home runs (7), and RBIs (46). Boccabella had another career highlight on July 6, 1973 when he hit two home runs in the sixth inning at Jarry Park, including a grand slam.

With the arrival in September 1973 of highly rated Expos' first round draft choice Barry Foote, Boccabella was traded to the Giants on March 27, 1974 for pitcher Don Carrithers after five seasons in Montreal. After one season with his hometown team, during which he batted just .138 in 29 games, Boccabella retired at the age of 33.

=== Career statistics ===
In a twelve-year major league career, Boccabella played in 551 games, accumulating 320 hits in 1,462 at bats for a .219 career batting average along with 26 home runs and 148 runs batted in. As a catcher, he had a .984 career fielding percentage.

== Personal life ==
After baseball Boccabella lived in Marin County, California with his wife Joyce. He worked as a marketing representative for PG&E for 19 years and retired in 1993. Boccabella is a Roman Catholic.
