= Randy Sterling =

American baseball player (born 1951)

- Pitcher
- Born: April 21, 1951 (age 73); Key West, Florida, U.S.
- Batted: Both Threw: Right

MLB debut
- September 16, 1974, for the New York Mets

Last MLB appearance
- September 28, 1974, for the New York Mets

MLB statistics
- Win–loss record: 1–1
- Earned run average: 4.45
- Strikeouts: 2
- Stats at Baseball Reference

Teams
- New York Mets (1974)

Randall Wayne Sterling (born April 21, 1951) is an American former Major League Baseball pitcher. He pitched in three games for the New York Mets in 1974. He pitched 9 1/3 innings over the three games, winning one game and losing one, with two strikeouts and an earned run average of 4.82. His win came as the starting pitcher in his Major League debut on September 16, 1974 against the Montreal Expos in Montreal.

Sterling was a 1st round draft pick of the Mets in 1969, and the 4th overall pick in the draft. He pitched in the minor leagues from 1969 to 1975. He pitched for the Tidewater Tides at the AAA level from 1973 to 1975. In 1973, he pitched 27 games with a 10–9 won–lost record and a 3.04 earned run average. In 1974 he pitched 28 games with a 12–11 won lost record and a 3.39 earned run average, earning a promotion to the Mets in September. His final professional season was 1975, in which he pitched 29 games for Tidewater, with a 10–11 won lost record and a 3.57 earned run average.
