= Rich Puig =

American baseball player (born 1953)

- Second baseman
- Born: March 16, 1953 (age 73); Tampa, Florida, U.S.
- Batted: Left Threw: Right

MLB debut
- September 13, 1974, for the New York Mets

Last MLB appearance
- September 25, 1974, for the New York Mets

MLB statistics
- Games played: 4
- At bats: 10
- Hits: 0
- Stats at Baseball Reference

Teams
- New York Mets (1974)

Richard Gerald Puig (born March 16, 1953) is an American former Major League Baseball player. The second baseman's major league career spanned four games for the New York Mets in 1974. He was selected fourteenth overall in the 1971 Major League Baseball draft by the Mets, one spot ahead of future Hall of Famer Jim Rice.

Puig was attending Hillsborough High School in Tampa, Florida, when he was drafted. Upon graduation, he joined their Appalachian League affiliate in Marion, Virginia, where he batted .217 with three home runs and thirteen runs batted in. Though he was drafted primarily for his glove, he displayed sloppy defense, committing seventeen errors.

He spent four seasons in the Mets' farm system, batting .251 with 27 home runs and 132 RBIs, when he received a September call up to New York City in 1974. In eleven plate appearances, he drew one walk. He also committed one error on the field.

He began the 1975 season with the Mets' triple A affiliate, the Tidewater Tides, but was released mid-season with a .182 batting average, no home runs, and three RBIs. He caught on with the Chicago White Sox shortly afterwards, and remained in their organization through 1976 before retiring.
