= 1970 St. Louis Cardinals season =

Major League Baseball season

1970 St. Louis Cardinals
- League: National League
- Division: East
- Ballpark: Busch Memorial Stadium
- City: St. Louis, Missouri
- Record: 76–86 (.469)
- Divisional place: 4th
- Owners: August "Gussie" Busch
- General managers: Bing Devine
- Managers: Red Schoendienst
- Television: KSD-TV
- Radio: KMOX (Jack Buck, Jim Woods)

The 1970 St. Louis Cardinals season was the team's 89th season in St. Louis, Missouri, and the 79th season in the National League. The Cardinals went 76–86 during the season and finished fourth in the National League East, 13 games behind the Pittsburgh Pirates. The season was also the first of 26 seasons for AstroTurf at Busch Memorial Stadium.

== Offseason ==
- October 7, 1969: Curt Flood, Byron Browne, Joe Hoerner, and Tim McCarver were traded by the Cardinals to the Philadelphia Phillies for Jerry Johnson, Dick Allen, and Cookie Rojas. Curt Flood refused to report to his new team. The Cardinals sent Willie Montañez to the Phillies on April 8, 1970, and Bob Browning (minors) to the Phillies on August 30, 1970, as compensation.
- January 17, 1970: Mike Tyson was drafted by the Cardinals in the 3rd round of the 1970 Major League Baseball draft.
- March 31, 1970: Ramón Hernández was released by the Cardinals.

=== Curt Flood ===
Curt Flood, because of a salary dispute with Gussie Busch, was traded after the 1969 season but refused to go to the Philadelphia Phillies and on January 16, 1970, filed a civil lawsuit to challenge baseball's reserve clause. The case eventually reached the Supreme Court and, though he lost, paved the way for free agency to change the game.

== Regular season ==
Bob Gibson won a Gold Glove and the Cy Young Award this year, with a 3.12 ERA, 23 wins, and 274 strikeouts. The Cardinals won only 76 games, their lowest total since the days of the 154-game schedule. Vic Davalillo had 24 pinch hits, breaking the National League record, and tying the Major League record set by Dave Philley in 1961.

Steve Carlton posted one game where he struck out 16 batters.

Third baseman Mike Shannon was limited to 52 games and soon would retire because of a kidney disease that threatened his life.

=== Season standings ===
NL East
Team	W	L	Pct.	GB	Home	Road
Pittsburgh Pirates	89	73	.549	—	50‍–‍32	39‍–‍41
Chicago Cubs	84	78	.519	5	46‍–‍34	38‍–‍44
New York Mets	83	79	.512	6	44‍–‍38	39‍–‍41
St. Louis Cardinals	76	86	.469	13	34‍–‍47	42‍–‍39
Philadelphia Phillies	73	88	.453	15½	40‍–‍40	33‍–‍48
Montreal Expos	73	89	.451	16	39‍–‍41	34‍–‍48

=== Record vs. opponents ===
1970 National League record Sources:
Team	ATL	CHC	CIN	HOU	LAD	MON	NYM	PHI	PIT	SD	SF	STL
Atlanta	—	8–4	5–13	9–9	6–12	6–6	6–6	7–5	6–6	9–9	7–11	7–5
Chicago	4–8	—	7–5	7–5	6–6	13–5	7–11	9–9	8–10	9–3	7–5	7–11
Cincinnati	13–5	5–7	—	15–3	13–5	7–5	8–4	7–5	8–4	8–10	9–9	9–3
Houston	9–9	5–7	3–15	—	8–10	8–4	6–6	4–8	6–6	14–4	10–8	6–6
Los Angeles	12–6	6–6	5–13	10–8	—	8–4	7–5	6–5	6–6	11–7	9–9	7–5
Montreal	6–6	5–13	5–7	4–8	4–8	—	10–8	11–7	9–9	6–6	6–6	7–11
New York	6–6	11–7	4–8	6–6	5–7	8–10	—	13–5	6–12	6–6	6–6	12–6
Philadelphia	5-7	9–9	5–7	8–4	5–6	7–11	5–13	—	4–14	9–3	8–4	8–10
Pittsburgh	6–6	10–8	4–8	6–6	6–6	9–9	12–6	14–4	—	6–6	4–8	12–6
San Diego	9–9	3–9	10–8	4–14	7–11	6–6	6–6	3–9	6–6	—	5–13	4–8
San Francisco	11–7	5–7	9–9	8–10	9–9	6–6	6–6	4–8	8–4	13–5	—	7–5
St. Louis	5–7	11–7	3–9	6–6	5–7	11–7	6–12	10–8	6–12	8–4	5–7	—

=== Opening Day starters ===
- Dick Allen
- Lou Brock
- José Cardenal
- George Culver
- Joe Hague
- Julián Javier
- Leron Lee
- Dal Maxvill
- Joe Torre

=== Notable transactions ===
- May 19, 1970: Don Shaw was purchased by the Cardinals from the Montreal Expos.
- May 29, 1970: Phil Gagliano was traded by the Cardinals to the Chicago Cubs for Ted Abernathy.
- June 4, 1970: Bake McBride was drafted by the Cardinals in the 37th round of the 1970 Major League Baseball draft.
- June 22, 1970: Chuck Hartenstein was selected off waivers by the Cardinals from the Pittsburgh Pirates.
- July 14, 1970: Chuck Hartenstein was sent by the Cardinals to the Boston Red Sox as part of a conditional deal.

=== Roster ===
1970 St. Louis Cardinals
Roster
Pitchers: 40 Ted Abernathy; 21 Frank Bertaina; 34 Nelson Briles; 30 Sal Campisi; 32 Steve Carlton; 40 Bob Chlupsa; 33 Reggie Cleveland; 39 George Culver; 45 Bob Gibson; 50,36 Santiago Guzmán; 26 Chuck Hartenstein; 19 Tom Hilgendorf; 39 Al Hrabosky; 21 Jerry Johnson; 35 Frank Linzy; 43 Billy McCool; 47 Fred Norman; 22 Rich Nye; 31 Harry Parker; 49 Jerry Reuss; 42 Chuck Taylor; 48 Mike Torrez	Catchers: 23 Ted Simmons; 9 Joe Torre; 29 Bart Zeller; Infielders: 15 Dick Allen; 14 Ed Crosby; 22 Jerry DaVanon; 16 Phil Gagliano; 12 Joe Hague; 25 Julián Javier; 24 Jim Kennedy; 27 Dal Maxvill; 41 Milt Ramírez; 11 Cookie Rojas; 18 Mike Shannon	Outfielders: 16 Jim Beauchamp; 20 Lou Brock; 1 José Cardenal; 38 José Cruz; 17 Vic Davalillo; 37 Leron Lee; 26 Luis Meléndez; 24 Jorge Roque; 44 Carl Taylor; Other batters: 10 Jim Campbell; 11 Joe Nossek	Manager: 2 Red Schoendienst; Coaches: 7 Vern Benson; 3 George Kissell; 8 Bob Milliken; 4 Billy Muffett; 5 Dick Sisler; 29 Bart Zeller

== Player stats ==
= Indicates team leader

= Indicates league leader

=== Batting ===
==== Starters by position ====
Note: Pos = Position; G = Games played; AB = At bats; H = Hits; Avg. = Batting average; HR = Home runs; RBI = Runs batted in

Pos	Player	G	AB	H	Avg.	HR	RBI
C	Joe Torre	161	624	203	.325	21	100
1B	Dick Allen	122	459	128	.279	34	101
2B	Julián Javier	139	513	129	.251	2	42
3B	Mike Shannon	55	174	37	.213	0	22
SS	Dal Maxvill	152	399	80	.201	0	28
LF	Lou Brock	155	664	202	.304	13	57
CF	José Cardenal	148	552	162	.293	10	74
RF	Leron Lee	121	264	60	.227	6	23

==== Other batters ====
Note: G = Games played; AB = At bats; H = Hits; Avg. = Batting average; HR = Home runs; RBI = Runs batted in

Player	G	AB	H	Avg.	HR	RBI
Joe Hague	139	451	122	.271	14	68
Ted Simmons	82	284	69	.243	3	24
Carl Taylor	104	245	61	.249	6	45
Vic Davalillo	111	183	57	.311	1	33
Ed Crosby	38	95	24	.253	0	6
Milt Ramírez	62	79	15	.190	0	3
Luis Meléndez	21	70	21	.300	0	8
Jim Beauchamp	44	58	15	.259	1	6
Cookie Rojas	23	47	5	.106	0	2
Phil Gagliano	18	32	6	.188	0	2
Jim Kennedy	12	24	3	.125	0	0
Jerry DaVanon	11	18	2	.111	0	0
José Cruz	6	17	6	.353	0	1
Jim Campbell	13	13	3	.231	0	1
Jorge Roque	5	1	0	.000	0	0
Joe Nossek	1	1	0	.000	0	0
Bart Zeller	1	0	0	----	0	0

=== Pitching ===
= Indicates league leader

==== Starting pitchers ====
Note: G = Games pitched; IP = Innings pitched; W = Wins; L = Losses; ERA = Earned run average; SO = Strikeouts

Player	G	IP	W	L	ERA	SO
Bob Gibson	34	294.0	23*	7	3.12	274
Steve Carlton	34	253.2	10	19	3.73	193
Mike Torrez	30	179.1	8	10	4.22	100
Jerry Reuss	20	127.1	7	8	4.10	74

- Tied with Gaylord Perry (San Francisco) for league lead

==== Other pitchers ====
Note: G = Games pitched; IP = Innings pitched; W = Wins; L = Losses; ERA = Earned run average; SO = Strikeouts

Player	G	IP	W	L	ERA	SO
Chuck Taylor	56	124.1	6	7	3.11	64
Nelson Briles	30	106.2	6	7	6.24	59
George Culver	11	56.2	3	3	4.61	23
Frank Bertaina	8	31.1	1	2	3.16	14
Harry Parker	7	22.1	1	1	3.22	9
Santiago Guzmán	8	13.2	1	1	7.24	9

==== Relief pitchers ====
Note: G = Games pitched; W = Wins; L = Losses; SV = Saves; ERA = Earned run average; SO = Strikeouts

Player	G	W	L	SV	ERA	SO
Sal Campisi	37	2	2	4	2.92	26
Frank Linzy	47	3	5	2	3.67	19
Tom Hilgendorf	23	0	4	3	3.92	13
Billy McCool	18	0	3	1	6.23	12
Reggie Cleveland	16	0	4	0	7.62	22
Al Hrabosky	16	2	1	0	4.74	12
Bob Chlupsa	14	0	2	0	8.82	10
Ted Abernathy	11	1	0	1	2.95	8
Jerry Johnson	7	2	0	1	3.18	5
Chuck Hartenstein	6	0	0	0	8.78	9
Rich Nye	6	0	0	0	4.50	5
Fred Norman	1	0	0	0	0.00	0

== Awards and honors ==
1970 Major League Baseball All-Star Game

- Dick Allen
- Bob Gibson
- Joe Torre

=== Team award winners ===
- Joe Torre and Bob Gibson, co-winners, St. Louis Baseball Man of the Year
- Jerry Reuss, St. Louis Cardinals Rookie of the Year

== Farm system ==
Level	Team	League	Manager
AAA	Tulsa Oilers	American Association	Warren Spahn
AA	Arkansas Travelers	Texas League	Ken Boyer
A	Modesto Reds	California League	Jack Krol
A	St. Petersburg Cardinals	Florida State League	Joe Cunningham
A	Cedar Rapids Cardinals	Midwest League	Roy Majtyka
A-Short Season	Lewis-Clark Broncs	Northwest League	Fred Hatfield
Rookie	GCL Cardinals	Gulf Coast League	Tom Burgess

LEAGUE CHAMPIONS: Lewis-Clark
