= Bernard Tarver =

American football player (1955–2007)

Profile
- Positions: Running back, Kick returner

Personal information
- Born: October 12, 1955
- Died: November 17, 2007 (aged 52)

Career information
- High school: Arvin High School
- College: USC

Awards and highlights
- National Champion (1977)

Bernard Tarver (October 12, 1955 - November 17, 2007) former running back and kick returner for the University of Southern California. Won a National Championship and two Rose Bowls while playing at USC.

In 1977 led the Trojans in kick off returns. Brother of former NFL player John Tarver and uncle of former UCLA basketball star Shon Tarver.

Great all around athlete at Arvin High School.
