= Junior Kennedy =

American baseball player (born 1950)

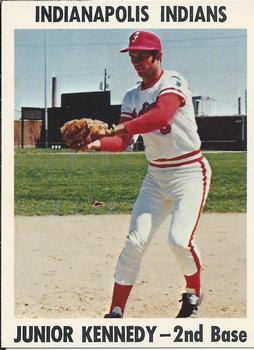
- Second baseman
- Born: August 9, 1950 (age 75); Fort Gibson, Oklahoma, U.S.
- Batted: Right Threw: Right

MLB debut
- August 9, 1974, for the Cincinnati Reds

Last MLB appearance
- July 17, 1983, for the Chicago Cubs

MLB statistics
- Batting average: .248
- Home runs: 4
- Runs batted in: 95
- Stats at Baseball Reference

Teams
- Cincinnati Reds (1974, 1978–1981); Chicago Cubs (1982–1983)

Junior Raymond Kennedy (born August 9, 1950) is an American former professional baseball second baseman, who played during seven Major League Baseball (MLB) seasons. Junior's older brother, Jim Kennedy, played for the 1970 St.Louis Cardinals.

== High school ==
A standout athlete at Arvin High School in Arvin, California, Kennedy was drafted in the first round (10th overall) of the 1968 Major League Baseball draft, by the Baltimore Orioles.

== Playing career ==
=== Minors ===
In 1969, Kennedy was named the California League Most Valuable Player, while with Stockton. In 1972, while playing in Rochester, he led International League (IL) shortstops in double plays with 80 and topped all American Association second basemen in fielding percentage with .976 for Indianapolis, in 1976.

On December 4, 1973, Kennedy was traded by Baltimore, along with William Wood and Merv Rettenmund to the Cincinnati Reds, for Wallace Williams and Ross Grimsley. At some point before 1977 Season, Kennedy was sent from the Reds to the San Francisco Giants in an unknown transaction; then, on October 20, 1977, he was purchased back by Cincinnati from San Francisco.

=== Cincinnati Reds ===
Kennedy spent five seasons with the Reds (1974, 1978–1981). Kennedy was known for his versatility and dependability, making him extremely valuable as a utility man, leading Reds Manager Sparky Anderson to comment that Kennedy was, "the kind (of utility man) that any club would want to have."

=== Chicago Cubs ===
On October 23, 1981, Kennedy was purchased by the Chicago Cubs from the Reds, for $50,000. He spent two seasons with the Cubs (1982–1983), before being released on August 1, 1983.

=== Career statistics ===
In 447 games over seven seasons, Kennedy posted a .248 batting average (258-for-1041) with 114 runs, 4 home runs, 95 RBIs and 124 bases on balls. Defensively, he recorded an overall .980 fielding percentage.

== Post career ==
After the 1983 season, Kennedy managed the Chicago Cubs’ Lodi farm team in the California League. On February 10, 1986, Kennedy was inducted into the Bob Elias Hall of Fame.
