= Thomas Rowland =

Thomas Rowland may refer to:

- Thomas Rowland (politician) (1784–1839), American politician and soldier in Michigan
- Thomas F. Rowland (1831–1907), American engineer and shipbuilder
- Tom Rowland (American football) (born 1945), American football player and coach
- Tommy Rowland (active 1968–1975), American football player
- Tom Rowland (politician) (active 1991–2017), mayor of Cleveland, Tennessee

== See also ==
- Rowland Thomas (ca. 1621 – 1698), English colonist in Springfield, Massachusetts
