= Dallas Grider =

American football player and coach

Dallas Edd Grider (December 5, 1944 – May 11, 2022) was an American football player and coach.

Grider played two seasons as a linebacker for the UCLA Bruins, including the 1966 Rose Bowl victory over Michigan State. He recovered a second-quarter onside kick that led to UCLA's second touchdown in the Rose Bowl and the onside kick in the UCLA–USC game that led to the Bruins' winning touchdown and a trip to the Rose Bow].

Grider was the head football coach at West High School in Bakersfield, California, where he built a winning tradition that dominated the Central Section for many years. While at West High he compiled a 77–7–2 record and won back-to-back valley championships. Grider served as the head football coach at Bakersfield College from 1995 to 2003.

Grider played at Arvin High School in Arvin, California and Bakersfield College before UCLA.
