= Charlie Hudson =

American baseball player (born 1949)

- Pitcher
- Born: August 18, 1949 (age 76); Ada, Oklahoma, U.S.
- Batted: Left Threw: Left

MLB debut
- May 21, 1972, for the St. Louis Cardinals

Last MLB appearance
- July 10, 1975, for the California Angels

MLB statistics
- Win–loss record: 5–3
- Earned run average: 5.04
- Strikeouts: 38
- Stats at Baseball Reference

Teams
- St. Louis Cardinals (1972); Texas Rangers (1973); California Angels (1975)

Charles Hudson (born August 18, 1949) is an American former left-handed Major League Baseball pitcher who played from 1972 to 1975 for the St. Louis Cardinals, Texas Rangers and California Angels. He was 6'3" tall and he weighed 185 pounds. He attended Tupelo High School in Tupelo, Oklahoma.

Hudson was originally drafted by the New York Mets in the 10th round of the 1967 draft. He had quite a bit of success as a starter in the minors, for example going a combined 20-9 with a 2.10 ERA in his first two minor league seasons. He was also used as a reliever at times in the minors, and he saw success in that role as well.

Before ever playing in a Major League uniform with the Mets, Hudson was traded with Art Shamsky, Jim Bibby and Rich Folkers to the St. Louis Cardinals for Jim Beauchamp, Harry Parker, Chuck Taylor, and Chip Coulter on October 18, 1971.

He spent less than a year in the Cardinals minor league system before making his big league debut on May 21, 1972 against the Chicago Cubs at the age of 22. Although he walked a batter in his first game, Hudson did not surrender a single hit or allow a single run in two innings pitched. The success he witnessed in his first game did not carry over to the rest of the season though, as he finished with a 5.11 ERA in 12 relief appearances.

On February 1, 1973, he was traded with a player to be named later to the Rangers for a player to be named later. The Cardinals' player to be named later ended up being Mike Nagy, while the Rangers' player to be named later ended up being Mike Thompson. He developed the knuckleball in 1973, and it became his key pitch.

Hudson appeared in 25 games in 1973, starting four of them. He posted an ERA of 4.62 and he struck out 34 batters in 62 1/3 innings of work. His one career complete game came on September 2 in the form of a 6-hit 2-0 shutout against the Minnesota Twins.

On April 24, 1974, he was traded to the Cleveland Indians for Ted Ford. He never appeared in the Majors in an Indians uniform though, and he was sent to the Angels on September 12, 1974 for Bill Gilbreth.

He appeared in three games for the Angels in 1975, starting one of them. He posted a record of 0-1. In five and two thirds innings of work that year, Hudson surrendered six earned runs for a 9.53 ERA. He played his final big league game on July 10, 1975.

Overall, Hudson went 5-3 with a 5.04 ERA in 40 games, five of which he started. In 80 1/3 innings of work, he surrendered 76 hits, walked 42 and struck out 38.

== Other information ==
- The last home run Hudson ever surrendered was to Hall of Famer Frank Robinson.
- He wore three uniform numbers in his career: 30 in 1972, 14 in 1973 and 41 in 1975.
- At last check, he lived in Coalgate, Oklahoma.
