= Jim Bibby =

American baseball player (1944–2010)

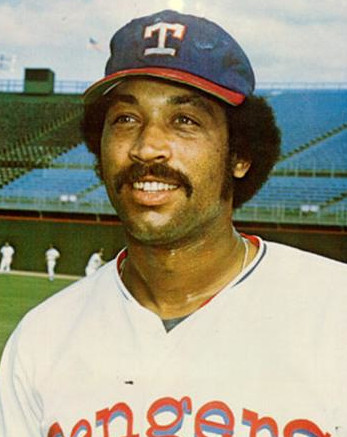
- Bibby in 1974
- Pitcher
- Born: October 29, 1944; Franklinton, North Carolina, U.S.
- Died: February 16, 2010 (aged 65); Lynchburg, Virginia, U.S.
- Batted: Right Threw: Right

MLB debut
- September 4, 1972, for the St. Louis Cardinals

Last MLB appearance
- May 26, 1984, for the Texas Rangers

MLB statistics
- Win–loss record: 111–101
- Earned run average: 3.76
- Strikeouts: 1,079
- Stats at Baseball Reference

Teams
- St. Louis Cardinals (1972–1973); Texas Rangers (1973–1975); Cleveland Indians (1975–1977); Pittsburgh Pirates (1978–1981, 1983); Texas Rangers (1984)

Career highlights and awards
- All-Star (1980); World Series champion (1979); Pitched a no-hitter on July 30, 1973

James Blair Bibby (October 29, 1944 – February 16, 2010) was an American Major League Baseball right-handed pitcher. During a 12-year baseball career, he pitched from 1972 to 1984 with the St. Louis Cardinals, Texas Rangers, Cleveland Indians, and Pittsburgh Pirates, with whom he was a member of its 1979 World Series champions. In 1973, Bibby pitched a no-hitter against the Oakland Athletics. In 1981, as a member of the Pirates, he missed out on a perfect game by just one hit, allowing a lead off single, before retiring the next 27 batters he faced.

== Playing career ==
=== New York Mets organization ===
Bibby attended Fayetteville State University on a basketball scholarship, and also pitched for its varsity baseball team. His professional career began when he was signed by the New York Mets as an undrafted free agent after his junior year on July 19, 1965. With Fayetteville State having discontinued its baseball program in the late-1970s, he was the only player from the university to reach the major leagues.

After appearing in thirteen games and posting a 2–3 record with an 11.25 ERA with the Marion Mets in 1965, he spent the next two years on active duty with the United States Army as a truck driver in Vietnam. On his return to baseball, Bibby moved up the organization's minor league system, first with the Raleigh-Durham Mets in 1968 before splitting time with the Memphis Blues and Tidewater Tides in 1969. His progress was interrupted again in 1970 when a back injury which required a spinal fusion of the first and second vertebrae sidelined him for the entire season and put his career in doubt. Bibby rebounded in 1971 by having his best campaign in the minors, as he led all Tides pitchers with a 15–6 mark.

=== St. Louis Cardinals ===
Bibby never got to pitch for New York because he was part of an eight-player transaction on October 18, 1971, when he, Art Shamsky, Rich Folkers and Charlie Hudson were sent to St. Louis for Chuck Taylor, Chip Coulter and two players who would help the Mets capture the National League pennant in 1973, Jim Beauchamp and Harry Parker. Bibby earned a promotion to the Cardinals late in 1972 as the Tulsa Oilers' top hurler at 13–9, with a 3.09 ERA, 13 complete games and 208 strikeouts. He made his major-league debut at age 27 as the starter in the second game of a Labor Day doubleheader at Busch Memorial Stadium on September 4. Despite surrendering four runs in 6 1/3 innings, Bibby picked up the win in the 8–7 triumph over the Montreal Expos. He made five more starts to finish the season, but lost three of them.

=== Texas Rangers ===
After beginning 1973 at 0–2 with a 9.56 ERA, Bibby was acquired by Texas on June 6, 1973, in exchange for Mike Nagy and John Wockenfuss. The trade was made at the urging of Whitey Herzog who, prior to becoming the Rangers manager, was the Mets director of player development. Herzog explained, "Bibby throws harder than anybody in this league except Nolan Ryan when he's on top of his game."

On July 30, Bibby no-hit the defending and eventual repeat World Champion Oakland Athletics 6–0 at the Oakland–Alameda County Coliseum, the first no-hitter in the franchise's history. Despite issuing six walks and relying almost exclusively on his fastball, he still registered thirteen strikeouts and outdueled Vida Blue—himself a no-hit pitcher in 1970. After he fanned in the ninth inning, Oakland's Reggie Jackson commented on the strike three pitch, "That's the fastest ball I ever saw. Actually I didn't see it. I just heard it." Bibby, whose salary was $15,000 that year, earned a $5,000 raise from team owner Bob Short as a result of the achievement.

On a ballclub that finished with the worst record in the majors at 57–105 and fired Herzog with 24 games remaining in the campaign, Bibby was its winningest pitcher despite a 9–10 record. When the Billy Martin-managed Rangers became the surprise team of 1974 by going 84–76 and vaulting into second place in the American League Western Division, Bibby (19–19) and the newly acquired Ferguson Jenkins (25–12) each made a club-record 41 starts to anchor the pitching staff. The nineteen losses, however, are also a club record.

=== Cleveland Indians ===
Bibby's inconsistency with his control plagued him again early in 1975 when he went 2–6 with a 5.00 ERA. He was traded along with Jackie Brown, Rick Waits and $100,000 to Cleveland for future Hall-of-Famer Gaylord Perry on 13 June 1975. The deal was actually the result of a feud between Perry and Indians manager Frank Robinson. Bibby compiled a 30–29 record with a 3.36 ERA in his 2 1/2 years in Cleveland. More importantly, with the help of pitching coach Harvey Haddix, he worked on improving his delivery to home plate and also added the curveball, slider and changeup to his repertoire.

Bibby was declared a free agent by an arbitrator during spring training on 6 March 1978. The reason was indicative of the financially strapped and inept Indians management at the time. Bibby's 1977 contract included a $10,000 bonus if he made at least thirty starts. He started exactly thirty of the 37 contests in which he appeared, but the Indians failed to make the payment by the deadline stated in the terms of the contract.

=== Pittsburgh Pirates ===
Bibby signed with Pittsburgh nine days later on 15 March 1978. He was originally expected to be the new closer, replacing Goose Gossage, who had left for the New York Yankees in the offseason. Instead, Bibby became a starter in the five-man rotation and had his most productive years with the Pirates, going 50–32 with a 3.53 ERA in five seasons.

His only postseason experience was when he helped the Pirates capture the 1979 World Series Championship. Despite not getting a decision in any of his three starts, Bibby pitched effectively with a 2.08 ERA and 15 strikeouts in 17 1/3 innings. In the 3–2 victory over the Cincinnati Reds in Game 2 of the National League Championship Series at Riverfront Stadium, he pitched seven innings and left the game with a 2–1 lead. Bibby went 6 1/3 innings and departed Game 4 of the Fall Classic with a 6–3 advantage in the 9–6 loss to the Baltimore Orioles at Three Rivers Stadium. When the Pirates clinched the series with a 4–1 win in Game 7 at Memorial Stadium, he lasted four innings, with his only mistake being Rich Dauer's home run to lead off the Orioles' third.

Bibby's best year in the majors was in 1980, when he posted a 19–6 record and a league-best .760 win–loss percentage. He also made his only appearance in an All-Star Game that season at Dodger Stadium on July 8. Bibby entered the game in relief of Jerry Reuss and pitched a scoreless seventh inning. After Robin Yount flied out to right field, Bibby surrendered a single to center to Willie Randolph, who was retired when Cecil Cooper grounded to the shortstop for a double play.

Bibby pitched a one-hit complete-game shutout in a 5–0 home win over the Atlanta Braves on 19 May 1981 when he recorded 27 consecutive outs after allowing a leadoff Terry Harper single to right. He also hit a pair of doubles, scored a run and drove in another.

After missing all of 1982 with a shoulder injury, Bibby spent one more season with the Pirates as a spot starter/long reliever. He was granted free agency on November 7, 1983.

=== Retirement ===
Bibby returned to the Rangers on February 7, 1984, but lasted only two months into the regular season as he pitched in eight games out of the bullpen without a decision. His final major league appearance was in a 5–1 loss to the Chicago White Sox at Arlington Stadium on May 26, 1984. After replacing Dave Tobik to start the ninth inning, Bibby allowed a single to Joel Skinner, a double to Rudy Law and an intentional walk to Jerry Hairston, Sr. to load the bases with one out. Bibby managed to not surrender any runs by getting a groundout from Mike Squires and a flyout from Greg Walker. Bibby was released on June 1.

He was picked up by St. Louis again on June 9. Bibby only appeared in two contests, without a decision, for the Louisville Redbirds, the Cardinals' Triple-A farm team at the time. His career as an active player came to an end when he was released on July 1.

== Coaching career ==
Bibby earned his bachelor's degree in health and physical education from Lynchburg College in 1980. His first coaching job was with the Durham Bulls immediately after the conclusion of his playing career in 1984. Bibby was the pitching coach for the Carolina League's Lynchburg, Virginia, ballclub from 1985 to 1999. He served the franchise beginning when it was affiliated with the Mets and through parent club/name changes in 1988 (Red Sox both) and 1995 (Pirates/Hillcats). Bibby was honored by the Hillcats in 2002, when his uniform number, 26, was the first one retired in the city's baseball history. He spent the 2000 minor league season in the same capacity with the Nashville Sounds, but retired from coaching after his contract was not renewed.

== Personal ==
Bibby was an older brother of former NBA player Henry Bibby and uncle of Mike Bibby.

He was married to Jacqueline Ann (Jordan) Bibby and had two daughters, Tamara Bibby of Washington, D.C., and Tanya Bibby (McClain) of Charlotte, North Carolina.

He died in Central Lynchburg General Hospital on February 16, 2010, due to bone cancer.

Preceded by Nolan Ryan	No-hitter pitcher July 30, 1973	Succeeded by Phil Niekro
