= Chip Coulter =

American baseball player (born 1945)

- Second baseman
- Born: June 5, 1945 (age 79); Steubenville, Ohio, U.S.
- Batted: Both Threw: Right

MLB debut
- September 18, 1969, for the St. Louis Cardinals

Last MLB appearance
- October 1, 1969, for the St. Louis Cardinals

MLB statistics
- Batting average: .316
- Runs scored: 3
- Runs batted in: 4
- On-base percentage: .381
- Slugging percentage: .474
- Games played: 6

Teams
- St. Louis Cardinals (1969)

Thomas Lee "Chip" Coulter (born June 5, 1945) is an American former Major League Baseball second baseman who played for the 1969 St. Louis Cardinals. Listed at 5'10" tall, weighing 172 pounds, Coulter was a switch-hitter and threw right-handed. He was born in Steubenville, Ohio.

Originally signed by the Cardinals as an amateur free agent in 1964, Coulter made his Major League debut at the age of 24 on September 18, 1969, against the Pittsburgh Pirates, facing pitcher Steve Blass, finishing the game 0-for-2, after which Julián Javier pinch hit for him in the eighth inning.

His second big league game, on September 26, 1969, was against the Montreal Expos where Coulter went 4-for-5, with a double and three RBIs, which saw the Cardinals win 12–1.

Coulter went 0-for-10 in his next three games, then in his final game, on October 1, 1969, he went 2-for-2 with a triple in his final at-bat, off Woodie Fryman.

Coulter finished his career with six hits in 19 at-bats for a .316 batting average and did not hit a home run. In total he appeared in six games, collecting a double and a triple, driving in four runs while scoring three times, walking twice and striking out six times. He committed one error in 25 fielding appearances for a .960 fielding percentage.

After his stint in the majors, Coulter continued playing in the Minor Leagues. He was traded with Jim Beauchamp, Harry Parker and Chuck Taylor from the Cardinals to the New York Mets for Art Shamsky, Jim Bibby, Rich Folkers and Charlie Hudson on October 18, 1971.

Coulter lives in Toronto, Ohio.
