= Arvin High School =

Location
- 900 Varsity Road; Arvin, California 93203; United States; 37.934415°N 118.836209°W

Information
- Type: Public
- Established: 1949
- School district: Kern High School District
- Principal: Gabriel Ramirez
- Staff: 111.31 (FTE)
- Grades: 9-12
- Enrollment: 2,728 (2023-2024)
- Student to teacher ratio: 24.51
- Campus: Rural
- Colors: Red and White
- Athletics: Baseball; Basketball; Cheerleading; Cross Country; Football; Golf; Soccer; Softball; Tennis; Track and Field; Volleyball; Wrestling
- Athletics conference: South Sequoia League; Central Section; Division 4
- Mascot: Bear
- Rival: Shafter High School, Mira Monte High School, Taft Union High School
- Newspaper: Bear Facts
- Yearbook: Preterit

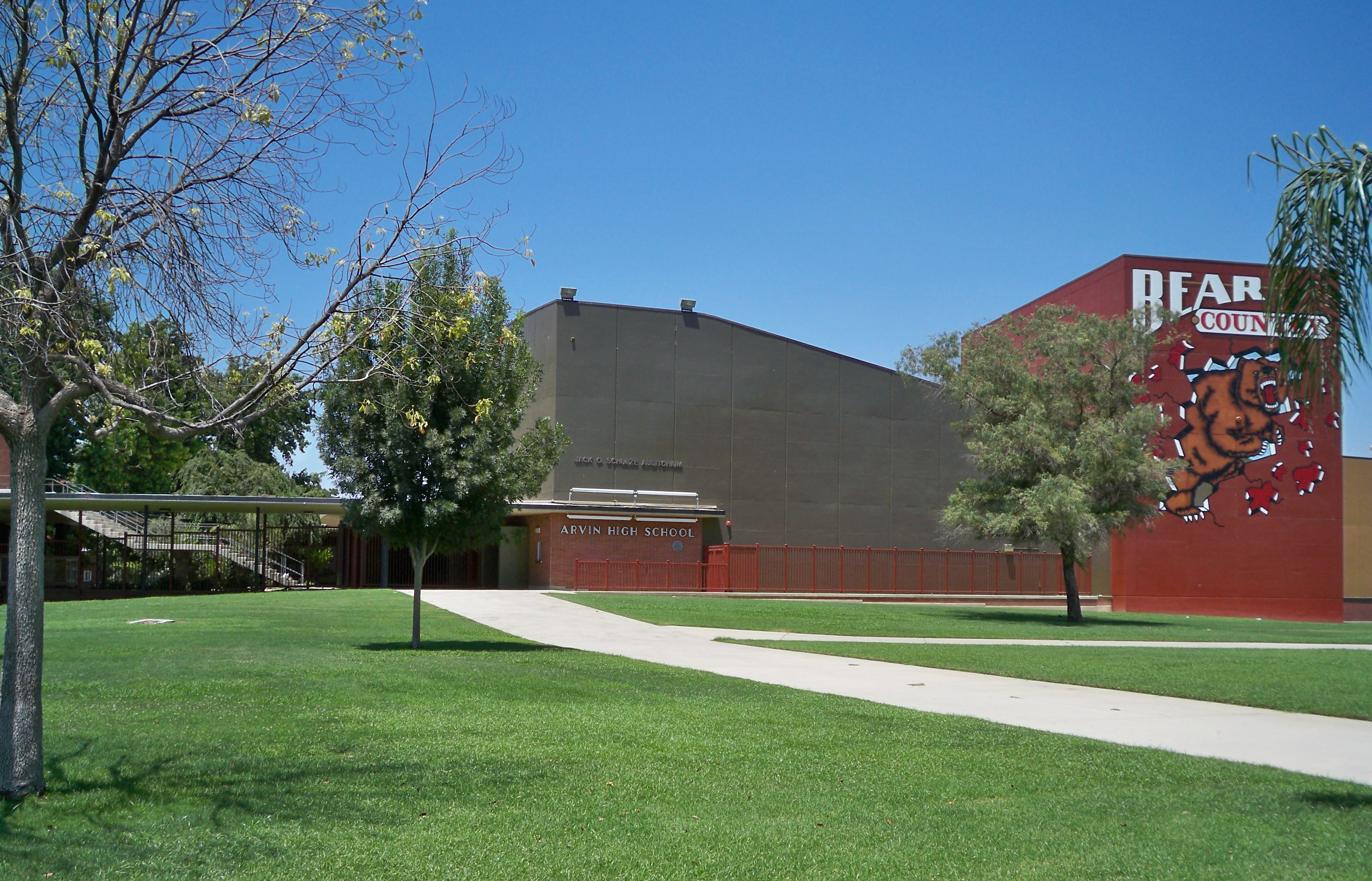
Arvin High School

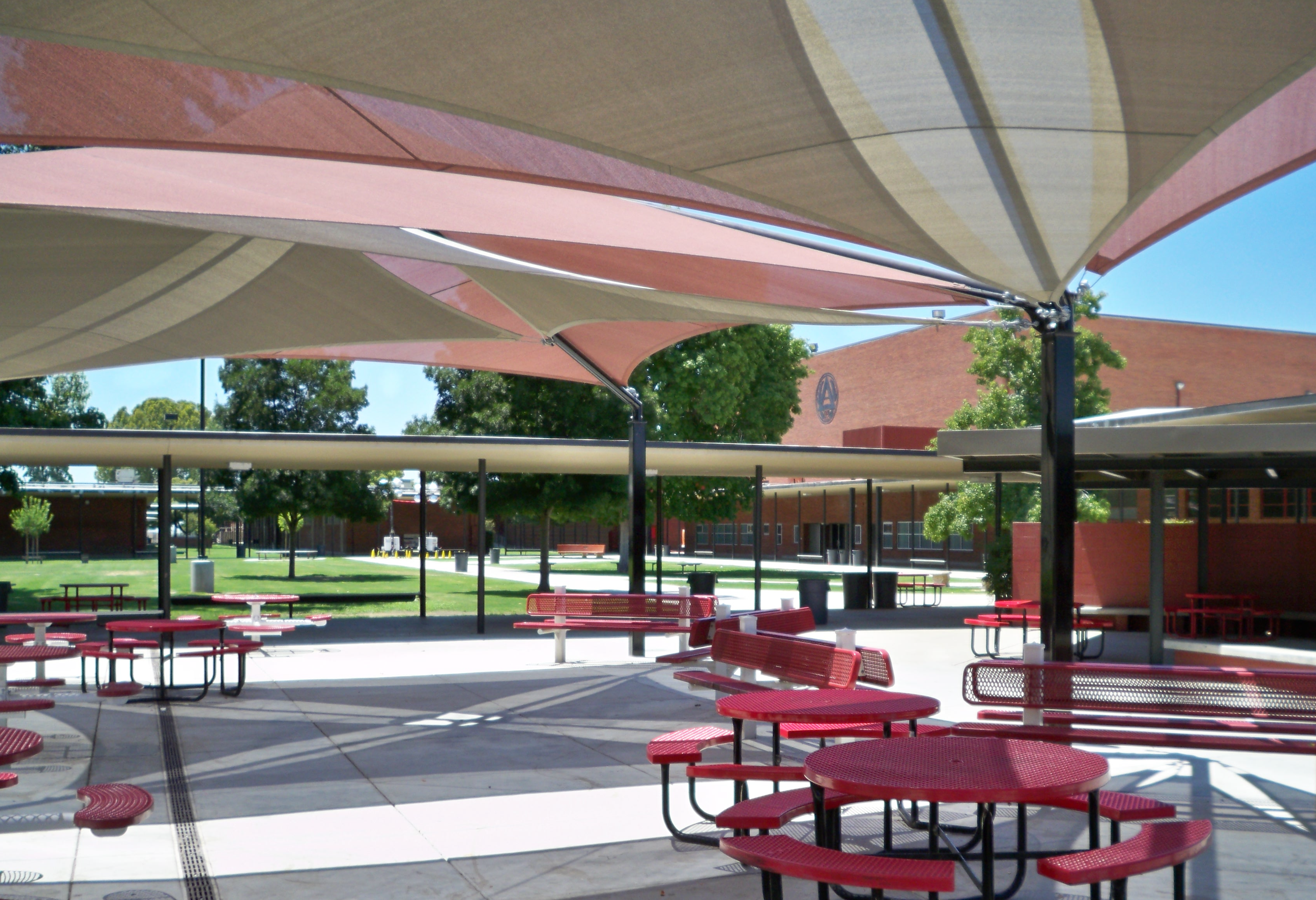
Arvin High Court Yard

Arvin High School is located in Arvin, California, United States and is part of the Kern High School District.

Arvin High School was established in 1949, and is located in the southern part of the San Joaquin Valley. Arvin High serves approximately 2,458 students in grades 9–12. The school is composed of three agriculturally based communities: Arvin, Lamont and Weedpatch. The nearest colleges are: California State University, Bakersfield, located 18 miles from the high school and Bakersfield Community College located 17 miles away.

Arvin High School has 115 classroom teachers, two directors, two program coordinators, five administrators, six counselors and 115 support personnel. The school is one of eighteen comprehensive, four-year high schools in the Kern High School District.

The school principal is Gabriel Ramirez. Up until 2016, the school principal was Carlos Sardo, and in 2024 Ed Watts also stepped down from his position as principal.

== History ==
Arvin High School was opened in 1949. Many of the original students came to the Arvin, California area during the Dust Bowl era as depicted in the book The Grapes of Wrath by John Steinbeck.

The first Arvin High graduating class was in 1952.

== Awards and recognition ==
Arvin High School achieved California Distinguished School status in 1994.

Since 2009, Arvin High has been named overall winner of the 20th Congressional District "We the People: The Citizen and the Constitution" competition.

In 2011 Arvin High School's manufacturing program was honored as "program of the year" for the state of California.

For the 2012–2013 school year, Arvin High School's "We the People: The Citizen and the Constitution" participated in the national competition; winning the 'Best Western States Team.'

The Winter Guard program won the PPAACC "AAA" Championships in 2012 and the SJVCGPR "A Bronze" Championships in 2013.

== Athletics ==
AHS is a member of the South Yosemite Horizon League of the CIF Central Section.

=== Frank Barle Stadium ===
In 1980 the stadium was named after retired 31-year AHS athletic director Frank John Barle by the Kern High School District. This was the first time that a stadium, field, or building was named after a living recipient. Mr. Barle was a member of the 1934 and 1935 University of Minnesota Golden Gophers college football national championship teams.

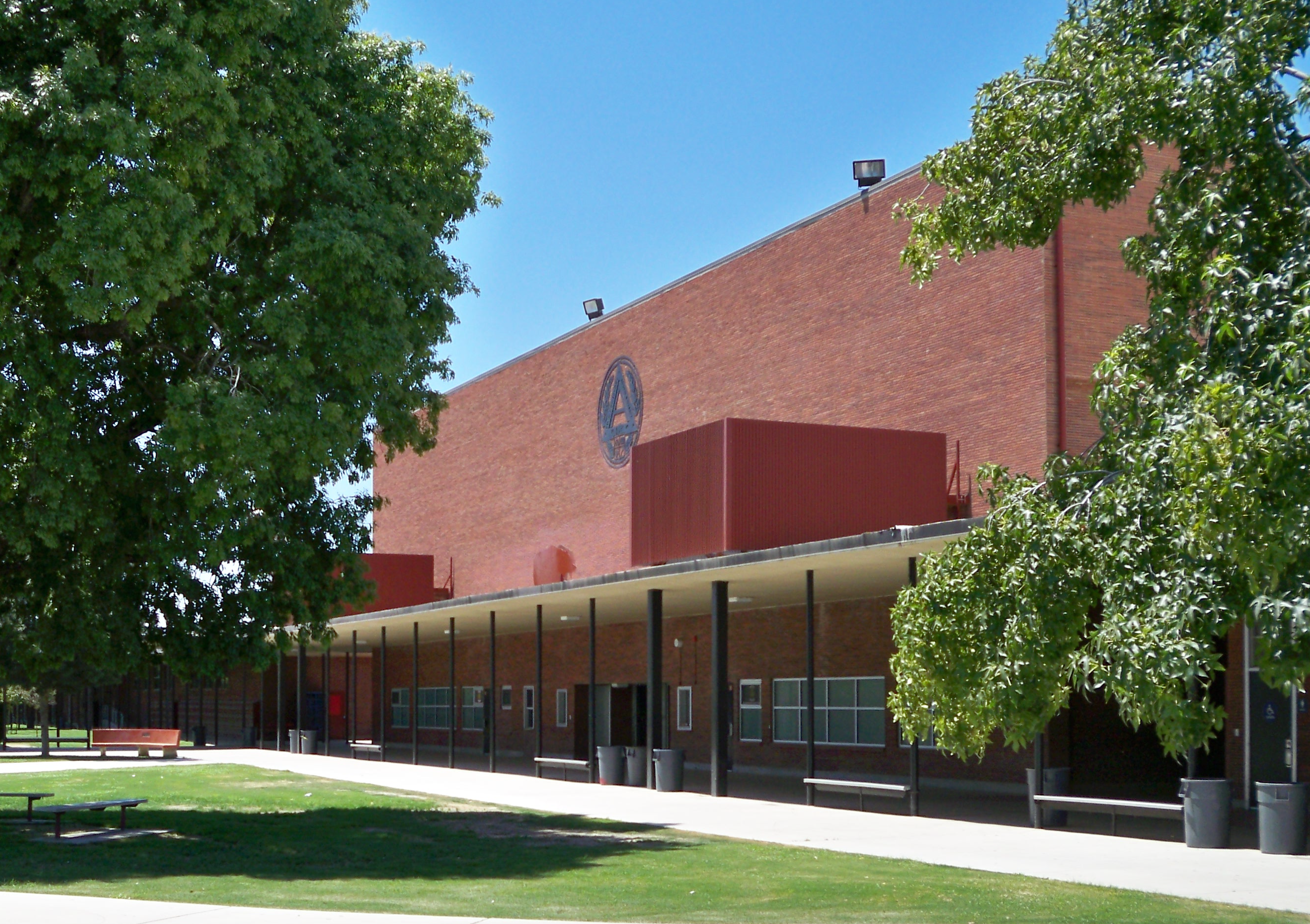
Arvin High Gym

== Performing arts ==
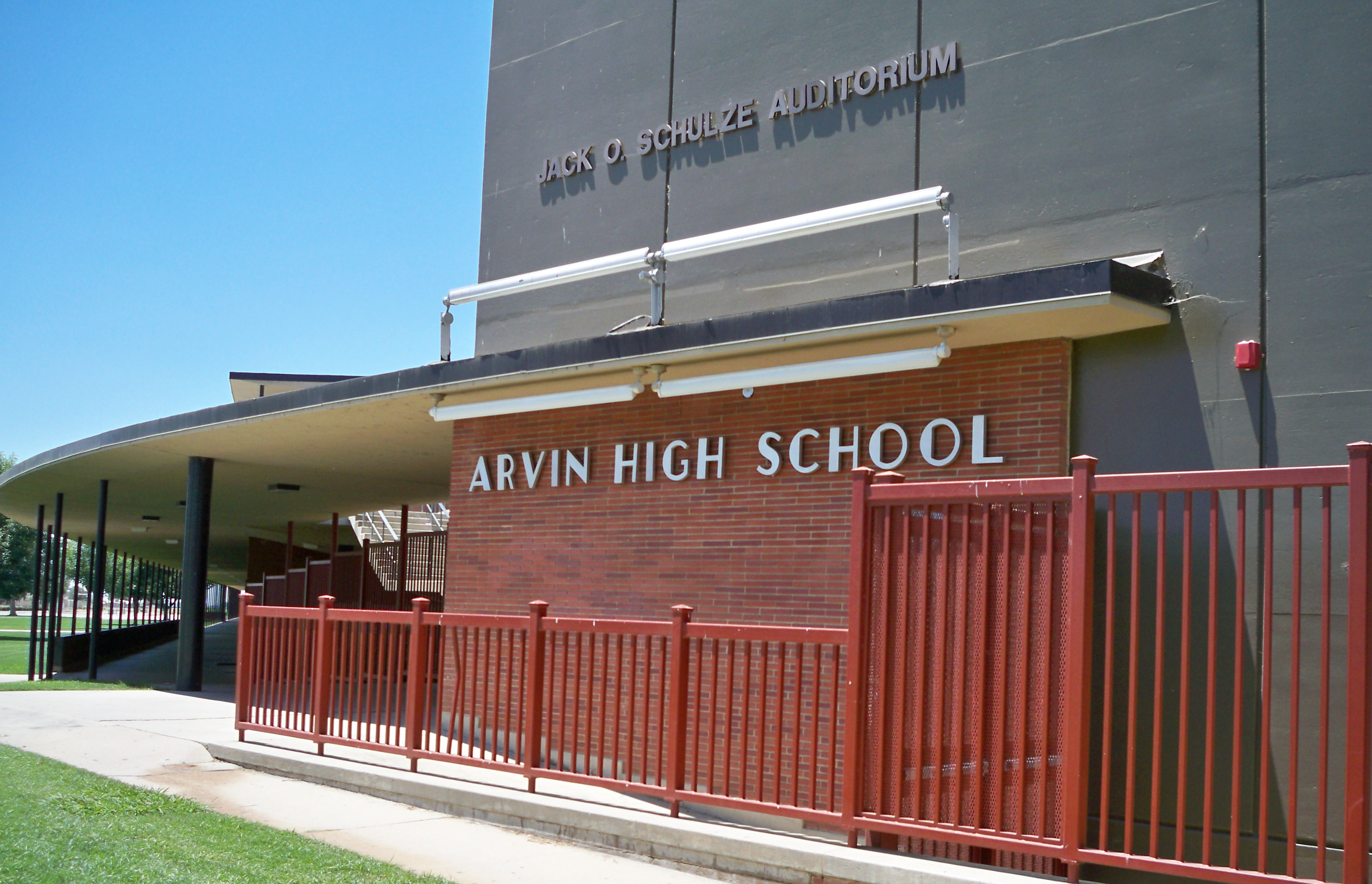
AHS Jack O Schulze Auditorium

=== Crimson Bear Brigade ===
The school band became known as the Arvin High Crimson Bear Brigade in 1979. The Crimson Bear Brigade performed at the opening ceremonies for the baseball portion of the 1984 Summer Olympics in Los Angeles, California.

== Notable alumni ==
- Dallas Grider - Former head football coach for the Bakersfield College Renegades.
- Shannon Grove - California CA Assemblywoman for the 32nd district (Republican).
- Jim Kennedy - Major League Baseball player for the St. Louis Cardinals.
- Junior Kennedy - Major League Baseball player for the Cincinnati Reds and Chicago Cubs.
- Marcos Reyes - Percussionist with the funk group War.
- Tommy Rowland - Defensive tackle and end for the University of Nevada, Las Vegas from 1968 to 1971. Elected into the Arvin High School Athletic Hall of Fame in 2010.
- Bernard Tarver - Former running back and lead kick off returner for the University of Southern California.
- John Tarver - National Football League player for the New England Patriots and Philadelphia Eagles.
