= Tupelo High School (Oklahoma) =

High school in Oklahoma, United States

Coordinates: 34.608345°N 96.446228°W

Tupelo High School is a public secondary school in Tupelo, Oklahoma, United States, serving grades 9–12 as part of Tupelo Public Schools in rural Coal County. As of the 2023–24 school year, the school enrolled 78 students and employed 7.72 full‑time equivalent teachers (student–teacher ratio 10.1:1). The school’s athletic programs compete under the Oklahoma Secondary School Activities Association (OSSAA) and use the “Tupelo Tigers” team name.

== History ==
Tupelo High School is operated by Tupelo Public Schools, a small rural district that maintains two campuses to serve students from pre‑kindergarten through grade 12. The school’s community context and demographics are profiled by the state Office of Educational Quality and Accountability (OEQA).

== Academics ==
Publicly reported data indicate a small student body and low student–teacher ratio. In widely used secondary school rankings compiled by U.S. News & World Report, Tupelo High School is listed among Oklahoma high schools based on state assessment performance and graduation metrics; the outlet reports an enrollment of 78 and a 10:1 student–teacher ratio, using government‑supplied data. State accountability information for all Oklahoma schools, including Tupelo High School, is available through the Oklahoma School Report Cards portal.

== Student life and athletics ==
Tupelo fields teams in multiple sports sanctioned by the Oklahoma Secondary School Activities Association. The school won the fast‑pitch softball Class B state championship in 2023 with a 3–2 victory over Turner in the final played at Oklahoma State University’s Cowgirl Stadium. The baseball program has also appeared at the OSSAA Class B state tournament; in 2025, Tupelo advanced to the quarterfinals in the spring season. Team schedules, coaches, and local tournament participation are published by the district.

== Notable alumni ==
- Charlie Hudson – former Major League Baseball pitcher (St. Louis Cardinals, Texas Rangers, California Angels); drafted out of Tupelo High School by the New York Mets in the 1967 MLB June Amateur Draft.

== See also ==
- List of school districts in Oklahoma
- Education in Oklahoma
- Oklahoma Secondary School Activities Association
