= Rich Folkers =

American baseball player and coach (born 1946)

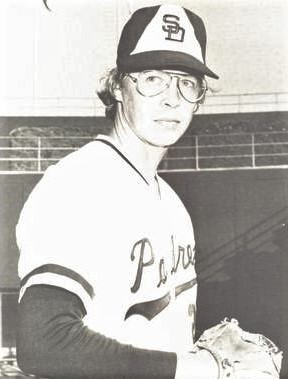
- Pitcher
- Born: October 17, 1946 (age 79); Waterloo, Iowa, U.S.
- Batted: Left Threw: Left

MLB debut
- June 10, 1970, for the New York Mets

Last MLB appearance
- June 8, 1977, for the Milwaukee Brewers

MLB statistics
- Win–loss record: 19–23
- Earned run average: 4.11
- Strikeouts: 242
- Stats at Baseball Reference

Teams
- New York Mets (1970); St. Louis Cardinals (1972–1974); San Diego Padres (1975–1976); Milwaukee Brewers (1977)

Richard Nevin Folkers (born October 17, 1946) is an American former professional baseball player and coach. He played in Major League Baseball as a left-handed pitcher from 1970 to 1977 for the New York Mets, St. Louis Cardinals, San Diego Padres and Milwaukee Brewers. He was 6 ft 2 in (1.88 m) tall and weighed 180 pounds (82 kilograms).

== The draft ==
Before entering professional baseball, Folkers attended both Ellsworth Community College and Parsons College and was originally drafted by the San Francisco Giants in the fourth round of the 1966 draft. Deciding not to sign, he was drafted by the Chicago White Sox and the New York Mets in 1967 at different times. The White Sox chose him in the third round, while the Mets took him in the first. The 20th pick overall of the secondary phase draft of 1967, Folkers decided to sign with the Mets.

== The minors ==
From 1967 to 1970, Folkers' earned run average in a minor league season never rose above 3.19. In 1968, his record was 13–9, and he posted an ERA of 2.41 in 27 games, striking out 142 and walking only 48 in 168 innings.

As noted on Baseball Reference.com, he missed the 1969 regular season while serving in the U.S. military, but did play briefly during the winter in the Florida Instructional League.

== First glimpse of the majors ==
Folkers got his first glimpse of the majors in 1970. On June 10, at the age of 23, Folkers pitched two solid innings in relief, giving up only one hit and allowing no runs. However, the success of that game did not carry over to the rest of the games. In 16 games that year, his ERA was 6.44. He walked 25 batters and struck out 15 in 29.1 innings of work.

== Back to the minors ==
He spent all of 1971 and most of 1972 in the minors. After having a lackluster 1971 season (7–11, 4.50 ERA), the Mets traded away their former first-round draft pick with Jim Bibby, Charlie Hudson and Art Shamsky to the Cardinals for Jim Beauchamp, Chuck Taylor, Harry Parker and Chip Coulter on October 18, 1971.^{[1]}

He posted a 3.10 ERA in the minors in 1972. He was recalled to the Majors, pitching nine games in relief for the Cardinals that year. This stint in the Majors was much more successful: not only did he collect his first big league win on September 30 against Ron Santo, Rick Monday and the rest of the Chicago Cubs, he also posted a 3.38 ERA.

== Back to stay in the majors ==
Folkers was used both as a starter and reliever in 1973, posting a 3.61 ERA in 34 games (nine of them started).

In 1974, he posted a 6–2 record in 55 relief appearances, which were third most on the team. He also posted a 3.00 ERA, which was 0.59 points better than the league average.

The 1974 season was Folkers' last in a Cardinals uniform. He was involved in a three-team deal on November 18, 1974 in which he was traded along with Sonny Siebert and Alan Foster from the Cardinals to the Padres for Ed Brinkman who had been sent to San Diego with Bob Strampe and Dick Sharon from the Detroit Tigers for Nate Colbert. Danny Breeden went from the Padres to the Cardinals to subsequently complete the transactions.

His tenure with the Padres was not nearly as successful as his tenure with the Cardinals. His first year with the San Diego team, 1975, ended with him posting a 6–11 record and a 4.18 ERA for a team which went 71–91 overall. He started 15 games that year, six more than his previous highest total. He walked only 39 in 142 innings of work. However, he was also 10th in the league in wild pitches, with nine thrown.

His final season with the Padres was 1976. The 29-year-old posted a 5.28 ERA that season in 59 2/3 innings of work.

He was claimed off waivers by the Milwaukee Brewers on March 23, 1977. Overall, he threw just over six innings for the Brewers that year, posting a 4.26 ERA.

Folkers was traded with Jim Slaton from the Brewers to the Tigers for Ben Oglivie at the Winter Meetings on December 9, 1977. Folkers never appeared in a big league game with the Tigers, and Slaton only pitched one season with them (however, he went 17–11 that year with a 3.89 ERA) before being reclaimed by the Brewers when he entered free agency after the 1978 season. Oglivie, on the other hand, went on to have the best years of his 16-season career while with the Brewers, hitting as many as 41 home runs in a season.

Folkers played in his final big league game on June 8, 1977.

== Career statistics ==
Overall in the majors, Folkers went 19–23 with a 4.11 ERA in 195 games. He gave up 416 hits in 423 innings of work, along with 170 walks, 40 home runs, 207 runs and 193 earned runs. Of the 28 games he started, he completed five of them. He had seven career saves.

He batted only .143 in 77 career at bats. Of the 11 hits he collected, only one was for an extra base hit—it was a double off Bob Forsch and his former team the Cardinals on August 8, 1975. He drove in six runs in his career, scored three and walked four times. He struck out 28 times.

As a fielder, he committed five errors in his career for a .941 fielding percentage.

== Personal life ==
Folkers currently lives in Bradenton, Florida. He served as a pitching coach at Eckerd College between 1988 and 1992, and later in the St. Louis Cardinals' farm system. He is probably best remembered for a line by the Padres' malaprop-prone broadcaster Jerry Coleman: "Rich Folkers is throwing up in the bullpen."
