= Sal Campisi =

American baseball player (born 1942)

- Pitcher
- Born: August 11, 1942 (age 83); Brooklyn, New York, U.S.
- Batted: Right Threw: Right

MLB debut
- August 15, 1969, for the St. Louis Cardinals

Last MLB appearance
- April 24, 1971, for the Minnesota Twins

MLB statistics
- Win–loss record: 3–2
- Earned Run Average: 2.70
- Strikeouts: 35
- Stats at Baseball Reference

Teams
- St. Louis Cardinals (1969–1970); Minnesota Twins (1971)

Salvatore John Campisi (born August 11, 1942) is an American former professional baseball player. A right-handed pitcher, he appeared in Major League Baseball for the St. Louis Cardinals in 1969 and 1970 and the Minnesota Twins in 1971. The 6 ft 2 in (1.88 m), 210 lb (95 kg) Campisi, a Brooklyn native, attended Long Island University Brooklyn before signing with the Cardinals in 1964.

Campisi put up three consecutive stellar seasons at the Double-A and Triple-A levels of minor league baseball from 1967 to 1969, with a gaudy won–lost record of 36–8 (.818) in 124 games pitched, 100 of them in relief. His overall minor-league record was 58–21 (.734). He worked in 50 MLB games, all as a relief pitcher, and allowed 62 hits and 47 bases on balls in 63 1/3 innings pitched. He had four saves — all for the 1970 Cardinals.
