= Art Shamsky =

American baseball player (born 1941)

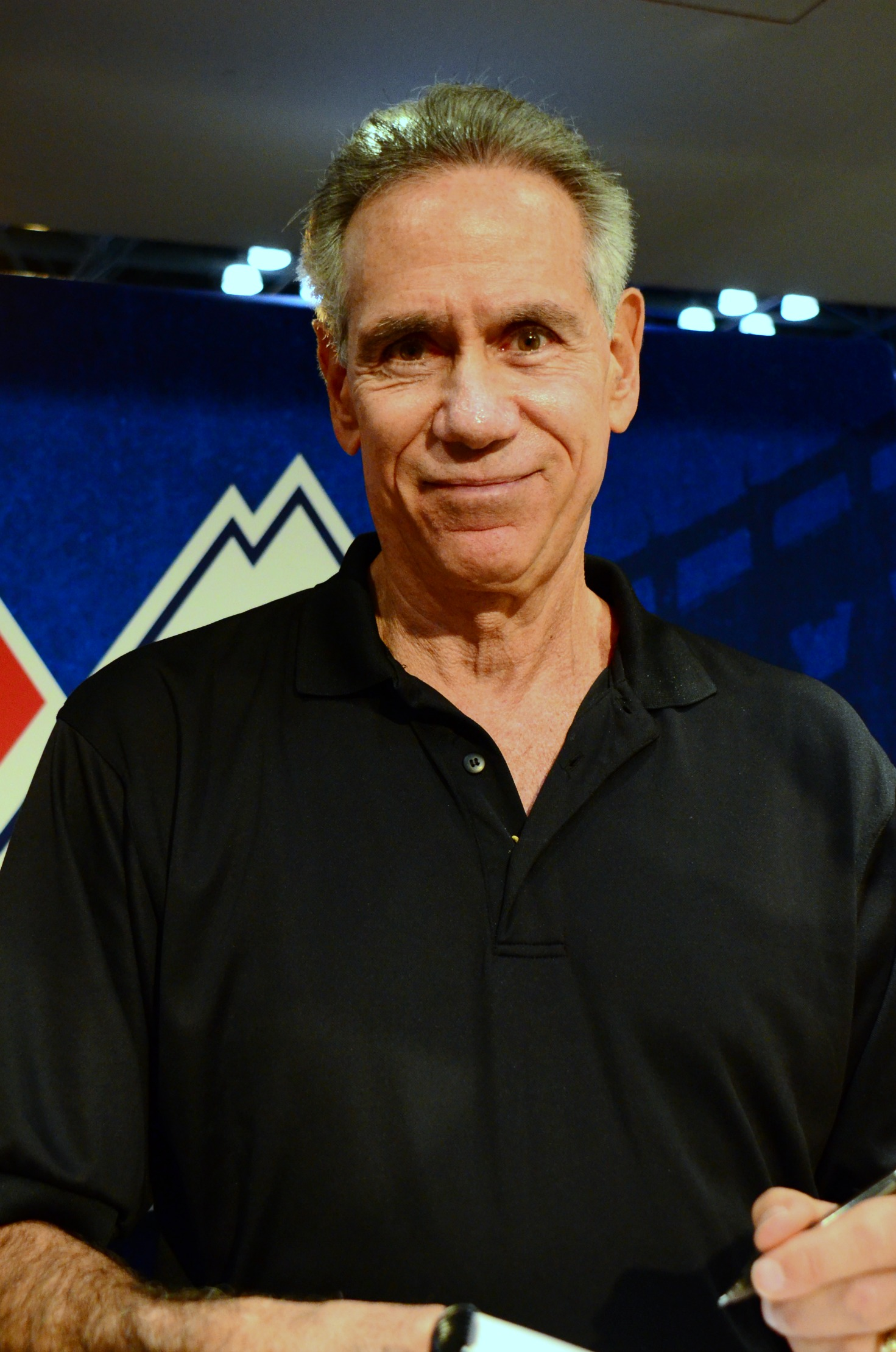
- Shamsky in 2013
- Outfielder
- Born: October 14, 1941 (age 84); St. Louis, Missouri, U.S.
- Batted: Left Threw: Left

MLB debut
- April 17, 1965, for the Cincinnati Reds

Last MLB appearance
- July 18, 1972, for the Oakland A's

MLB statistics
- Batting average: .253
- Home runs: 68
- Runs batted in: 233
- Stats at Baseball Reference

Teams
- Cincinnati Reds (1965–1967); New York Mets (1968–1971); Chicago Cubs (1972); Oakland Athletics (1972)

Career highlights and awards
- World Series champion (1969)

Arthur Louis Shamsky (/ˈʃæmski/ SHAM-skee; born October 14, 1941), nicknamed "Sham" and "Smasher", is an American former Major League Baseball player. He played right field, left field, and first base from 1965 to 1972 for the Cincinnati Reds, New York Mets, Chicago Cubs, and Oakland Athletics. He tied a major league record by homering in four consecutive at bats in 1966. He was an integral player on the 1969 World Series Champion Miracle Mets, batting .300 with 14 home runs (both second on the team) while platooning, and then hitting .412 in the post-season batting cleanup and .368 overall. In 2007, he was the manager of the Modi'in Miracle of the Israel Baseball League.

== Early life ==
Shamsky is Jewish, and was born in St. Louis to William (whose family came from Ukraine) and Sadie Shamsky (whose family came from Poland), and grew up in the suburb of University City. He attended University City High School in St. Louis and played on the school's baseball team, as did pitcher Ken Holtzman four years later—who in 1972 was his teammate on the Oakland A's. He also played basketball for the school, and graduated at the age of 16.

Shamsky attended the University of Missouri and played college baseball for the Missouri Tigers in his freshman year in 1958–59. Shamsky signed with the Cincinnati Reds as a free agent in September 1959. He said: "My father would have preferred that I had gone into business, but he was into baseball and I think he was thrilled when I signed. My mother certainly wanted me to go to college and become a doctor, of course. What else is a Jewish boy supposed to do?"

== Minor league career ==
Shamsky began his professional baseball career in 1960 with the Geneva Redlegs of the New York–Penn League, where he was the roommate of Pete Rose. He finished the season with a .271 batting average and 91 walks (7th in the league), 8 triples (8th in the league), 18 homers (2nd in the league), and 86 RBIs (6th in the league), and led the league's outfielders in assists with 24, and was named to the All-Star team.

He played with the Topeka Reds in 1961 (hitting .288 with a .410 on base percentage (9th in the league), .469 slugging percentage (10th in the league), 82 walks (8th in the league) and 15 home runs (tied for ninth in the league), and the Macon Peaches in 1962 (hitting .284 with a .535 slugging percentage (7th in the league) and 16 home runs). Shamsky played with the AAA San Diego Padres in 1963 and 1964, where he hit .267 with 18 home runs his first year and .272 with 25 home runs (7th in the league) his second year. In 1964 he set the record for the longest home run hit in the Padres’ park, at 500 feet.

== Major league career ==
=== Cincinnati Reds (1965–67) ===
In 1965, when he was 23 years old, Shamsky made the Cincinnati Reds out of spring training as a sub, and hit .260. In the winter of 1965, he played for Cangrejeros de Santurce in the Puerto Rican Winter League.

Shamsky tied a major league record by homering in four consecutive at-bats for the Reds on August 12 and 14, 1966. The first three home runs were hit in a game in which he was inserted in the eighth inning as part of a double switch. He homered in the bottom half of that inning and remained in the game to hit home runs in his next two extra-inning at bats, extending the game each time. The feat made Shamsky the first player in Reds history to hit two home runs in extra innings in one game. He is also the only player in Major League history to hit three home runs in a game in which he was not in the starting lineup. The fourth home run was hit as a pinch hitter in the next game he played, on August 14. His bat from that day is on display at the National Baseball Hall of Fame and Museum. He finished the year with 21 home runs (second on the team) and 47 RBIs, and a .521 slugging percentage, in only 234 at-bats.

=== New York Mets (1968–71) ===
The Reds traded Shamsky to the New York Mets for infielder Bob Johnson in November 1967. Having suffered from back pain the prior season, he had off-season surgery to have a cyst removed from his tailbone. He initially found living in New York City to be intimidating, but eventually he "fell in love with the energy, got to know the city a bit. My life changed." He became a favorite of Jewish fans in New York.

In 1969, Shamsky hit .300 (second on the team), with a .375 on-base percentage, a .488 slugging percentage, and 14 home runs (second on the team) as half of a right field platoon with Ron Swoboda for the World Champion Mets. He did this in pain, while suffering from a slipped disk in his back that was pressing against his sciatic nerve; one doctor told him he might never play again. Shamsky was the regular starter against right-handed pitchers, with Swoboda starting against lefties. He batted .385 as a pinch hitter, and .388 in games that were late and close. He still gets comments about his decision to not play on Yom Kippur that year. "The funny thing was, the Mets won both ends of a double header that day," he later said.

Shamsky's torrid hitting continued into the 1969 post-season. He started all three games of the NLCS, where he batted .538 batting cleanup, leading all batters. In the World Series, Shamsky started only in Game 3, which was played on his 28th birthday. He went hitless in six at-bats in the series.

In 1970, he hit .293 (leading the team) with a .371 on-base percentage. Despite only 402 at-bats, he was seventh in the league with 13 intentional walks.

After an injury-ridden season, he was traded with Jim Bibby, Rich Folkers and Charlie Hudson from the Mets to the St. Louis Cardinals for Jim Beauchamp, Harry Parker, Chuck Taylor and Chip Coulter on October 18, 1971. In April 1972, he was released by the St. Louis Cardinals, and five days later signed as a free agent with the Chicago Cubs.

=== Chicago Cubs and Oakland A's (1972) ===
After playing 22 games for the Chicago Cubs in 1972, Shamsky was purchased by the Oakland A's in June of that year, but he was released in July. A chronic back injury was a factor in his decision to retire in 1972 at age 30 after 13 years in pro baseball, with 68 homers and a World Series ring.

== Halls of Fame ==
Shamsky is a member of the New York Jewish Sports Hall of Fame. He was inducted into the National Jewish Sports Hall of Fame in 1994.

== Managing career ==
Shamsky was the Manager of the Modi'in Miracle in the 2007 first season of the Israel Baseball League. Shamsky faced Ken Holtzman as opposing managers for the first All Star game of the Israel Baseball League. The Miracle finished the inaugural 2007 season 22–19 (.537), in third place, and after upsetting the # 2 Tel Aviv Lightning in the semi-finals, lost to the Bet Shemesh Blue Sox 3–0 in the championship game. The Israel Baseball League did not resume play after 2007, but Shamsky continued to be active in the Israel Association for Baseball.

== After baseball ==
After his baseball career, Shamsky became a real estate consultant with First Realty Reserve, and a sports radio and television broadcaster for WFAN, WNYW television, ESPN television, WNEW television Channel 5 in New York City, as well as a play-by-play and color commentator for the New York Mets on radio and television. In addition, he hosted a talk show on WFAN Sports Radio, and has written featured guest editorials for the sports section of The New York Times.

He owned a New York restaurant, "Legends".

He has written two books, including The Magnificent Seasons: How the Jets, Mets, and Knicks Made Sports History and Uplifted a City and the Country, with Barry Zeman (Thomas Dunne Books). The book is about the New York Jets, New York Mets, and New York Knicks all winning championships for the first time in 1969 and 1970. His second book, out in 2019, After the Miracle, written with Erik Sherman, was on the New York Times bestseller list.

Shamsky has two daughters, Toni and Terri, with his first wife, Randee. Shamsky and his second wife, Kim, divorced in 2006.

== In popular culture ==
In Everybody Loves Raymond, Ray and Robert's childhood bulldog was named after Shamsky, and as an adult, Robert named his new bulldog Shamsky II. Shamsky made an appearance, along with several other members of the 1969 Mets, in the series as themselves ("Big Shots" – Season 3, Episode 19). Robert has referred to Shamsky in more than one episode, claiming he homered his first time at-bat as a Met, which is actually not true.

Comedian Jon Stewart named one of his pit bulls Shamsky.

== See also ==
- List of Jewish Major League Baseball players
