= Joe Hague =

American baseball player (1944–1994)

- First baseman / Right fielder
- Born: April 25, 1944; Huntington, West Virginia, U.S.
- Died: November 5, 1994 (aged 50); San Antonio, Texas, U.S.
- Batted: Left Threw: Left

MLB debut
- September 19, 1968, for the St. Louis Cardinals

Last MLB appearance
- June 2, 1973, for the Cincinnati Reds

MLB statistics
- Batting average: .239
- Home runs: 40
- Runs batted in: 163
- Stats at Baseball Reference

Teams
- St. Louis Cardinals (1968–1972); Cincinnati Reds (1972–1973)

Joe Clarence Hague (April 25, 1944 – November 5, 1994) was an American professional baseball player. Over his eight-year career, Hague spent six in Major League Baseball. In 430 major league games, Hague batted .239 with 141 runs, 286 hits, 41 doubles, 10 triples, 40 home runs, and 163 runs batted in (RBIs). Over his major league career, Hague played first base (232 games), and outfield (272 games). Hague played for the St. Louis Cardinals and the Cincinnati Reds in his six-year major league career.

Over his minor league career, Hague batted .279 with 515 hits, 109 doubles, 18 triples, and 75 home runs in 510 games. Like in his major league career, Hague played both first base (352 games) and outfield (20 games) in the minors. Hague played with four different teams that three levels of the minor leagues in his career. His first professional team was the Class-A Cedar Rapids Cardinals followed by the Double-A Arkansas Travelers, and eventually the Triple-A Tulsa Oilers. Hague made his major league debut on September 19, 1968. He went on to play for the Triple-A Tulsa Oilers for a second time (1969) and the Triple-A Indianapolis Indians (1973) in the minors.

== Amateur career ==
Hague attended Bel Air High School in El Paso, Texas. At Bel Air, Hague played football, baseball, and basketball. He stated that he only played basketball for the coordination. After high school, Hague was pursued by the Houston Astros, however, no deal ever formed. He went on to attend the University of Texas at Austin (UT Austin) in Austin, Texas. At UT Austin, Hague was described as a "top college prospect" by the Associated Press in 1965. Hague began his career at UT Austin as a tight end and defensive end on the football team before giving it up after one season to pursue opportunities in baseball. Hague was one of the top hitters in the country leading the country in doubles, home runs, and runs batted in through April 11, 1965. It was speculated by the Associated Press that Hague would be selected in the 1965 Major League Baseball draft; however, he went undrafted. Hague spent the summer starring with Galesburg in the Central Illinois Collegiate League, and on August 31, 1965, he signed a contract with the St. Louis Cardinals, receiving a bonus in excess of $10,000. He then returned to school until beginning his career the following year.

== Professional career ==
=== St. Louis Cardinals ===
Hague began his professional career in 1966 with the Class-A Cedar Rapids Cardinals of the Midwest League. In his first professional at-bat, Hague hit a grand slam. With Cedar Rapids, Hague batted .251 with 109 hits, 24 doubles, six triples, and nine home runs in 119 games. On the defensive side, Hague played exclusively at first base. Hague was first on the Cardinals in games played; second in at-bats (435), doubles, and triples; and third in hits.

Hague was promoted to the Double-A Arkansas Travelers in 1967, his second professional season. In 140 games, Hague batted .271 with 73 runs, 141 hits, 28 doubles, one triple, 27 home runs, 95 runs batted in (RBIs), and 10 stolen bases. On the Travelers, Hague was first in games played, plate appearances (569), at-bats (521), runs, hits, doubles, home runs, RBIs, walks (48), batting average, slugging percentage (.484), on-base plus slugging (.816), and total bases (252). Hague was first in the Texas League in games played, and RBIs; tied for second in home runs; third in doubles, plate appearances, and at-bats; and fourth in hits. He played all 140 games at first base and committed 14 errors in 1391 total chances. In October 1967, Hague was added to the St. Louis Cardinals' 40-man roster.

Before the start of the 1968 season, the St. Louis Cardinals re-signed Hague. After spending spring training with the Cardinals, Hague was optioned to the Triple-A Tulsa Oilers of the Pacific Coast League. With the Oilers, Hague batted .293 with 81 runs, 155 hits, 34 doubles, eight triples, 23 home runs, 99 RBIs, and four stolen bases in 147 games. He was first on the Oilers in games played, plate appearances (589), at-bats (529), hits, triples, and total bases (274); tied for first in home runs; second in RBIs, batting average, slugging percentage (.518), and on-base plus slugging (.883). Hague led the Pacific Coast League in games played, and total bases; was second in RBIs; was tied for second in home runs; and was third in hits, and doubles. That season, Hague made his major league debut. His first major league game was on September 19, against the San Francisco Giants where he scored one run after he was walked once. Hague's first hit was a home run, coming on September 20 against the Los Angeles Dodgers. In his first season at the major league level, he batted .235 with two runs, four hits, one home run, one RBI, and two walks in seven games.

Originally at the start of the 1969 season, it looked as if there would be little chance that Hague would get playing time behind then-first baseman Orlando Cepeda. During spring training, however, the Cardinal traded Cepeda for catcher Joe Torre and it was noted that Hague might get more playing time in the majors. Hague made the Cardinals' 25-man roster out of spring training. In his first eight games, Hague went hitless. Hague was sent down to the Triple-A Tulsa Oilers in June. With the Oilers, Hague batted .332 with 63 runs, 95 hits, 20 doubles, three triples, 16 home runs, and 53 RBIs in 84 games. Hague was a September call-up for the Cardinals late in the season along with five other players. In the majors that season, Hague batted .170 with eight runs, 17 hits, two doubles, one triple, two home runs, and eight RBIs in 40 games.

Going into the 1970 season, the Cardinals' manager Red Schoendienst stated that he would give the starting first baseman job to Hague. It was also noted that Hague would get playing time in right field. Hague re-signed with the Cardinals in February 1970. In a Cardinals' 9–2 win over the New York Mets on May 29, Hague had four hits and drove in five runs. On the season, Hague batted .271 with 58 runs, 122 hits, 16 doubles, four triples, 14 home runs, 68 RBIs, and two stolen bases in 139 games. On the defensive side, Hague played 82 games at first base where he committed four errors in 724 chances, and 52 games in the outfield where he committed one error in 81 chances. Hague was third on the Cardinals in home runs, and walks (63). That season, Hague set career highs in games played, plate appearances, at-bats, runs, hits, doubles, triples, RBIs, stolen bases, walks, strikeouts, batting average, on-base percentage, slugging percentage, and on-base plus slugging.

In December 1970, Hague re-signed with the Cardinals. Hague stated that he wasn't satisfied with his performance during the 1970 season. Hague also acknowledged he had a weight problem and attempted to address it by showing up to spring training early. On June 5, 1971, Hague hit two home runs against the Cincinnati Reds in a 5–3 Cardinals victory. Hague batted .226 with 46 runs, 86 hits, nine doubles, three triples, 16 home runs, and 54 RBIs in 129 games with the Cardinals. Hague was second on the team home runs, and was third in walks (63), and strikeouts (69) in 1971. On the defensive side, Hague played 91 games at first base, and committed three errors in 671 chances; and 36 games in the outfield, and committed two errors in 60 chances. He set a career high in home runs in 1971.

In February 1972, Hague re-signed with the Cardinals. During the 1972 offseason, the Cardinals were in trade negotiations with the San Diego Padres to get pitcher Dave Roberts in exchange for left fielder Luis Meléndez and shortstop Milt Ramirez. Hague was disappointed that the trade fell through because he felt the Cardinals could win the World Series with Roberts, and without Meléndez, Hague would have a starting spot on the team. On May 19, Hague was traded to the Cincinnati Reds for outfielder Bernie Carbo. Hague played 27 games with the Cardinals that season and batted .237 with eight runs, 18 hits, five doubles, one triple, three home runs, and 11 RBIs.

=== Cincinnati Reds ===
After the trade from the St. Louis Cardinals, it was noted by the Christian Science Monitor that Hague was expected to be a key in the Reds' success. On the season with the Reds, Hague batted .246 with 17 runs, 34 hits, seven doubles, one triple, four home runs, and 20 RBIs in 69 games. Hague played in the 1972 National League Championship Series with the Reds and went hitless in one at-bat and two walks. He also played three games in the 1972 World Series, going hitless in three at-bats. Hague returned to the Reds in 1973 and split time between the majors and minors. On June 9, 1973, Hague was placed on the disabled list after suffering a dislocated bone in his right hand. With the Reds that season, Hague batted .152 with two runs, five hits, two doubles, one home run, and one RBI in 19 games. He played 20 games with the Triple-A Indianapolis Indians in the minor leagues and batted .203 with 15 hits, and three doubles. On March 28, 1974, Hague was placed on waivers by the Reds and eventually released.

== Personal ==
Hague was born in Huntington, West Virginia, however, as a child his family moved to El Paso, Texas. Hague had a wife, Mickey, whom he had a daughter with. His father was a Chief Master Sergeant in the United States Army. As a player, Hague made it a personal preference not to use profanity and instead replaced it in his speech with the word mullet. Hague, who said that he used profanity a lot as a kid, stated that he stopped because "you don't gain anything from it". He took up golf during his early professional baseball career. Hague died from cancer at age 50 in San Antonio, Texas.
