= Jim Campbell (pinch hitter) =

American baseball player (born 1943)

- Pinch hitter
- Born: January 10, 1943; Hartsville, South Carolina, U.S.
- Died: December 29, 2024 (aged 81); Darlington County, South Carolina, U.S.
- Batted: Left Threw: Right

MLB debut
- April 11, 1970, for the St. Louis Cardinals

Last MLB appearance
- May 13, 1970, for the St. Louis Cardinals

MLB statistics
- Games played: 13
- At bats: 13
- Batting average: .231
- Stats at Baseball Reference

Teams
- St. Louis Cardinals (1970)

James Robert Campbell (January 10, 1943 – December 29, 2024) was an American professional baseball player whose ten-season career included appearing in 13 games in Major League Baseball (MLB) for the 1970 St. Louis Cardinals, exclusively as a pinch hitter. A first baseman during his minor league career, Campbell batted left-handed, threw right-handed, stood 6 feet (1.8 m) tall and weighed 205 pounds (93 kg). He was born in Hartsville, South Carolina — also the hometown of Bobo Newsom, a renowned MLB pitcher of the middle 20th century — and entered pro baseball in the Philadelphia Phillies' system in 1962.

Campbell was in his ninth professional campaign when he earned a place on the Cardinals' 28-man, early-season roster in 1970. His first appearance, on April 11, came during the Redbirds' fourth game of the National League season. The next day, Campbell registered his first big-league hit, a single off eventual Baseball Hall of Famer Tom Seaver in the seventh inning of a 6–4 loss to the New York Mets. Two days later, on April 14, his ninth-inning pinch single off Howie Reed produced the tying run and Campbell's only MLB RBI in a come-from-behind 6–5 triumph against the Montreal Expos at Busch Memorial Stadium. Campbell then sat on the bench for a week before his next appearance, and was only able to collect one more hit his final ten at bats before returning to the minor leagues. With his three singles (and no bases on balls) in his 13 MLB plate appearances, Campbell posted a career batting average, on-base percentage and slugging percentage of .231. He slugged 127 home runs in 1,207 games as a minor leaguer.

He was traded to the Boston Red Sox during the 1970 offseason for veteran infielder Ducky Schofield and played one more year at the Triple-A level before leaving the game.
