= Chuck Taylor (baseball) =

American baseball player (1942–2018)

- Pitcher
- Born: April 18, 1942; Shelbyville, Tennessee, U.S.
- Died: June 5, 2018 (aged 76); Murfreesboro, Tennessee, U.S.
- Batted: Right Threw: Right

MLB debut
- May 27, 1969, for the St. Louis Cardinals

Last MLB appearance
- October 3, 1976, for the Montreal Expos

MLB statistics
- Win–loss record: 28–20
- Earned run average: 3.07
- Strikeouts: 282
- Stats at Baseball Reference

Teams
- St. Louis Cardinals (1969–1971); New York Mets (1972); Milwaukee Brewers (1972); Montreal Expos (1973–1976)

Charles Gilbert Taylor (April 18, 1942 – June 5, 2018) was an American professional baseball player who played in the Major League Baseball as a relief pitcher from 1969 to 1976 for the St. Louis Cardinals, New York Mets, Milwaukee Brewers and Montreal Expos.

== Early life ==
Before being signed by the Cardinals in 1961, Taylor attended Bell Buckle High School and then Middle Tennessee State University.

== Baseball career ==
=== St. Louis Cardinals ===
Taylor spent three years (1961 to 1963) in the St. Louis Cardinals minor league system before being traded on February 17, 1964 to the Houston Colt .45s with first baseman/outfielder Jim Beauchamp for outfielder Carl Warwick.

He spent only one full season in the Colt '45s/Astros farm system—1964. Midway through the 1965 season, he was traded back to the Cardinals, this time with pitcher and former All-Star Hal Woodeshick for pitcher and future All-Star Mike Cuellar and pitcher Ron Taylor.

Up until 1968, Taylor had respectable, but not outstanding, statistics in the minors, having been used both as a starter and reliever, and although he had a very good season with the Arkansas Travelers in 1966—posting a 1.31 ERA in 30 games—his success was countered that season with some bad outings with the Tulsa Oilers, where he had an ERA of 6.48 in 21 games.

1968 was perhaps the best season of his entire professional career. As a starter, he appeared in 34 games for the Oilers, allowing only 202 hits in 230 innings, walking just 38 batters, and posting a record of 18 and 7 with a very respectable 2.35 ERA. At 26 years of age, he was fairly old prospect-wise, but still managed to impress the St. Louis Cardinals enough to put him on their roster for 1969.

On May 27, 1969, Taylor made his big league debut with the Cardinals, appearing in relief of pitcher Ray Washburn, and it was ultimately Taylor who gave up the winning run to the opposing team, the Atlanta Braves.

Taylor was used both as a reliever and starter in his debut season, appearing in 27 games total, starting 13 of them, and posting a 7–5 won–loss record. His ERA was exactly a point below the league average: 2.56.

=== New York Mets ===
Taylor's next two seasons, 1970 and 1971, proved to be successful as well. Both years, he was used almost entirely as a reliever, posting ERAs of 3.11 and 3.53, respectively.

He was traded with Jim Beauchamp, Harry Parker and Chip Coulter to the Mets for Art Shamsky, Jim Bibby, Rich Folkers and Charlie Hudson on October 18, 1971.

=== Milwaukee Brewers ===
1972 was not a very successful year for Taylor. In fact, he ended up spending a large portion of it in the minors, where he posted a 4.70 ERA in 26 games. In the Majors that year, Taylor had a 5.52 ERA with the Mets before being selected off waivers by the Brewers in September. In 11 innings with the Brewers that year, he posted a 1.54 ERA, bringing his season ERA down to 4.43.

=== Montreal Expos ===
In March 1973, Taylor was released by the Brewers and signed by the Montreal Expos a couple of weeks later. In his first year with the Expos, he posted a 1.77 ERA, but appeared in only eight games, where that performance, however, was something of a foreshadowing of what would happen in the year to come.

1974 was the best season of his Major League career. He appeared in relief 61 times, posting a 2.17 ERA in 107 2/3 innings. He ranked ninth in the league in game appearances, fifth in the league in saves with 11 and sixth in the league in games finished with 39.

The next two seasons, 1975 and 1976, were not as successful as he posted ERAs of 3.53 and 4.50 respectively. He wrapped up his career in 1976, playing in his final big league game on October 3.

Overall, for his career, Taylor went 28–20 with a 3.07 ERA in 305 big league appearances. Of the 21 games he started, he completed six of them (five of them in one season, 1969) and shut out two. In exactly 607 innings of work, Taylor walked 162 batters and struck out 282. Only twice did his season ERA measure greater than the overall league ERA—in 1972 and 1976.

At the plate, Taylor hit .158 in 101 at-bats, collecting 16 hits. Of those 16 hits, four were doubles and one was a triple. He struck out 34 times and walked only three times.

In the field, he committed two errors in 135 total chances for a .985 fielding percentage.
