= Tupelo, Oklahoma =

City in Oklahoma, US

- City
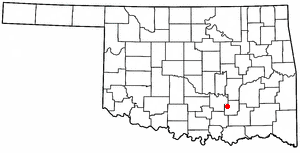
- Location of Tupelo, Oklahoma
- Coordinates: 34°36′10″N 96°25′15″W
- Country: United States
- State: Oklahoma
- County: Coal

Area
  - Total: 0.42 sq mi (1.08 km^{2})
  - Land: 0.42 sq mi (1.08 km^{2})
  - Water: 0 sq mi (0.00 km^{2})
- Elevation: 712 ft (217 m)

Population (2020)
  - Total: 327
  - Density: 787.4/sq mi (304.01/km^{2})
- Time zone: UTC-6 (Central (CST))
  - Summer (DST): UTC-5 (CDT)
- ZIP code: 74572
- Area code: 580
- FIPS code: 40-75050
- GNIS feature ID: 2412112

Tupelo is a city in Coal County, Oklahoma, United States. As of the 2020 census, Tupelo had a population of 327.

== History ==
A post office opened at Jeffs, Indian Territory on June 28, 1894. It moved to the present site of Tupelo on October 25, 1900, and its name changed to Tupelo, Indian Territory on January 13, 1904. Jeffs took its name from Jefferson D. Perry, first postmaster. Tupelo was named for Tupelo, Mississippi, which itself was named for the tupelo gum tree.

At the time of their founding, Jeffs, and later Tupelo, were located in Atoka County, a part of the Pushmataha District of the Choctaw Nation.

== Geography ==
Tupelo is located in western Coal County. Oklahoma State Highway 3 bypasses the town to the north and leads 14 miles (23 km) southeast to Coalgate, the county seat, and 20 miles (32 km) northwest to Ada. State Highway 48 passes through Tupelo, leading south 16 miles (26 km) to Wapanucka and north 20 miles (32 km) to Allen.

According to the United States Census Bureau, Tupelo has a total area of 0.42 square miles (1.1 km^{2}), all land.

== Demographics ==
Historical population
Census	Pop.	Note	%±
1950	376		—
1960	261		−30.6%
1970	485		85.8%
1980	542		11.8%
1990	323		−40.4%
2000	393		21.7%
2010	329		−16.3%
2020	327		−0.6%
U.S. Decennial Census

=== 2020 census ===
As of the 2020 census, Tupelo had a population of 327. The median age was 30.8 years. 30.9% of residents were under the age of 18 and 13.1% of residents were 65 years of age or older. For every 100 females there were 98.2 males, and for every 100 females age 18 and over there were 96.5 males age 18 and over.

All residents lived in rural areas.

There were 98 households in Tupelo, of which 44.9% had children under the age of 18 living in them. Of all households, 46.9% were married-couple households, 20.4% were households with a male householder and no spouse or partner present, and 24.5% were households with a female householder and no spouse or partner present. About 19.4% of all households were made up of individuals and 9.2% had someone living alone who was 65 years of age or older.

There were 125 housing units, of which 21.6% were vacant. Among occupied housing units, 76.5% were owner-occupied and 23.5% were renter-occupied. The homeowner vacancy rate was 3.8% and the rental vacancy rate was 31.6%.

Racial composition as of the 2020 census
Race	Percent
White	60.6%
Black or African American	0%
American Indian and Alaska Native	23.2%
Asian	0%
Native Hawaiian and Other Pacific Islander	0%
Some other race	0.3%
Two or more races	15.9%
Hispanic or Latino (of any race)	3.1%

=== 2000 census ===
As of the 2000 census, there were 377 people, 136 households, and 99 families residing in the city. The population density was 939.1 inhabitants per square mile (362.6/km^{2}). There were 178 housing units at an average density of 443.4 per square mile (171.2/km^{2}). The racial makeup of the city was 70.29% White, 0.53% African American, 24.40% Native American, 0.27% from other races, and 4.51% from two or more races. Hispanic or Latino of any race were 2.65% of the population.

There were 136 households, out of which 41.2% had children under the age of 18 living with them, 55.9% were married couples living together, 12.5% had a female householder with no husband present, and 27.2% were non-families. 22.8% of all households were made up of individuals, and 14.0% had someone living alone who was 65 years of age or older. The average household size was 2.77 and the average family size was 3.29.

In the city the population was spread out, with 31.3% under the age of 18, 11.4% from 18 to 24, 24.4% from 25 to 44, 18.8% from 45 to 64, and 14.1% who were 65 years of age or older. The median age was 29 years. For every 100 females, there were 95.3 males. For every 100 females age 18 and over, there were 90.4 males.

The median income for a household in the city was $17,000, and the median income for a family was $19,688. Males had a median income of $21,563 versus $15,000 for females. The per capita income for the city was $8,852. About 29.6% of families and 30.7% of the population were below the poverty line, including 39.7% of those under age 18 and 22.8% of those age 65 or over.

== Notable people from Tupelo ==
- Cord McCoy, professional bull rider and contestant on three seasons of The Amazing Race.

== See also ==
- Tupelo High School
