= Jim Kennedy (infielder) =

American baseball player (born 1946)

- Infielder
- Born: November 1, 1946 (age 79); Tulsa, Oklahoma, U.S.
- Batted: Left Threw: Right

MLB debut
- June 14, 1970, for the St. Louis Cardinals

Last MLB appearance
- July 9, 1970, for the St. Louis Cardinals

MLB statistics
- Batting average: .125
- Home runs: 0
- Runs batted in: 0
- Stats at Baseball Reference

Teams
- St. Louis Cardinals (1970)

James Earl Kennedy (born November 1, 1946) is an American former professional baseball player who appeared in 12 games in Major League Baseball for the 1970 St. Louis Cardinals as a shortstop (seven games) and as a second baseman (five games). Born in Tulsa, Oklahoma, he was a standout athlete at Arvin High School in California, and attended Bakersfield College and Cal Poly-San Luis Obispo. He batted left-handed, threw right-handed, and was listed as 5 feet 9 inches (1.75 m) tall and 160 pounds (73 kg). A younger brother, Junior Kennedy, also an infielder, played in MLB for seven seasons between 1974 and 1983.

Jim Kennedy was originally signed by the New York Yankees in 1966 as a free agent, and was acquired by the Cardinals in the 1969 Rule 5 draft. He spent most of the 1970 season in the city of his birth as a member of the Triple-A Tulsa Oilers, with his major-league trial occurring over four weeks spanning June 14 to July 9. At the plate, Kennedy collected three hits, all singles, in 24 at bats, with no bases on balls or runs batted in. In the field, he started three games at shortstop and three at second, playing in 65 total innings and committing four errors in 43 chances (.907).

His last year in pro baseball was spent back in the Yankees' organization in 1973.
