= Jim Beauchamp =

American baseball player (1939–2007)

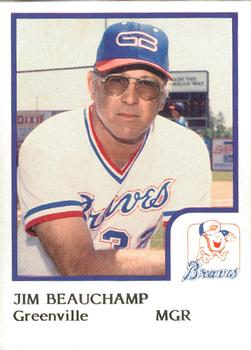
- Beauchamp as manager of the Greenville Braves in 1986
- Outfielder / First baseman
- Born: August 21, 1939; Vinita, Oklahoma, U.S.
- Died: December 25, 2007 (aged 68); Union City, Georgia, U.S.
- Batted: Right Threw: Right

MLB debut
- September 22, 1963, for the St. Louis Cardinals

Last MLB appearance
- September 20, 1973, for the New York Mets

MLB statistics
- Batting average: .231
- Home runs: 14
- Runs batted in: 90
- Stats at Baseball Reference

Teams
- St. Louis Cardinals (1963); Houston Colt .45s/Astros (1964–1965); Milwaukee/Atlanta Braves (1965, 1967); Cincinnati Reds (1968–1969); Houston Astros (1970); St. Louis Cardinals (1970–1971); New York Mets (1972–1973)

Career highlights and awards
- World Series champion (1995)

James Edward Beauchamp (/ˈbiːtʃʌm/ BEECH-um; August 21, 1939 – December 25, 2007) was an American Major League Baseball first baseman and outfielder who played from 1963 to 1973 for the St. Louis Cardinals, Houston Colt .45s/Astros, Milwaukee/Atlanta Braves, Cincinnati Reds, and New York Mets. He attended Grove High School in Grove, Oklahoma and Oklahoma State University before being signed by the Cardinals in 1957. He was the father of former minor league baseball player Kash Beauchamp. He was 6'2' and weighed 205 pounds.

== Professional career ==
A power hitting minor leaguer, Beauchamp had perhaps the best year of his professional career in 1963 for the Double-A Tulsa Oilers, batting .337 with 31 home runs and 105 RBI. He also collected 35 doubles and 10 triples while scoring 95 runs. Beauchamp won the 1963 Texas League MVP Award, and a sign showing him in his batting stance stood outside Tulsa's Oiler Park until the stadium was demolished in 1980. He earned a short call up to the majors in 1963, making his major league debut on September 22 at the age of 24, going hitless in three major league at-bats.

Beauchamp was traded to the Houston Colt .45s in February 1964 with Chuck Taylor for outfielder Carl Warwick. Beauchamp again dominated in the minors in 1964, belting 34 home runs and collecting 83 RBI with a .285 batting average. In 23 Major League games that year, he collected nine hits in 55 at-bats for a .164 batting average.

He started the 1965 season with the Houston Astros, playing in 24 games before being traded to the Milwaukee Braves with Ken Johnson for Lee Maye. He played in four games with the Braves that year. Overall, he hit .179 in 56 at-bats.

Beauchamp hit .319 with 25 home runs and 77 RBI in 115 games for the Richmond Braves in 1966. He did not appear in the Majors that season. He spent most of the 1967 season in the minors as well, hitting 25 home runs and driving in 63 runs for Richmond. His averaged dropped to .233. He appeared in four games in the Majors for the Braves that year, collecting no hits in three at-bats.

In October 1967, Beauchamp was traded with Mack Jones and Jay Ritchie to the Reds for Deron Johnson.

He started the 1968 season in the minors, hitting 13 home runs and driving in 47 RBI for the Indianapolis Indians. He spent 31 games in the Majors that year, hitting .263 in 57 at-bats.

Beauchamp hit .250 in 60 at-bats for the Reds in 1969, driving in eight RBI. After the season, he was traded back to Houston for Pat House and Dooley Womack. He hit .192 in 31 games for the Astros that year, and was traded to the Cardinals – another one of his former teams. He was sent with Leon McFadden to the Cardinals for George Culver. He hit .259 in 44 games for the Cardinals, and overall he hit .238 on the season.

He spent all of 1971 with the Cardinals, hitting .235 in 77 games. He was traded with Harry Parker, Chuck Taylor and Chip Coulter from the Cardinals to the Mets for Art Shamsky, Jim Bibby, Rich Folkers, and Charlie Hudson on October 18, 1971.

He played his final two seasons with the Mets, hitting .242 in 58 games for them in 1972 and .279 in 50 games in 1973. He played his final regular season game on September 20, 1973, almost exactly 10 years after his big league debut. Beauchamp appeared in four games in the 1973 World Series for the Mets, going hitless in four at-bats. He was released by the Mets in March of 1974.

Overall, Beauchamp played in 393 Major League games, collecting 153 hits in 661 at-bats for a .231 batting average. He hit 18 doubles, four triples and 14 home runs while driving in 90 RBI. He walked 54 times and struck out 150 times. Defensively, he recorded an overall .979 fielding percentage.

== Coaching ==
After his playing days ended, Beauchamp managed in the minors from 1975 to 1990. He managed the Columbus Astros in 1975, the Memphis Blues in 1976, the Charleston Charlies from 1977 to 1979, the Syracuse Chiefs from 1982 to 1984, the Greenville Braves from 1985 to 1987 and the Richmond Braves from 1988 to 1990. From 1991 to 2001, he was the Atlanta Braves' bench coach, and after 2002 he was the team's minor league outfield coordinator.

== After baseball ==
In 2002, Beauchamp was present with family and friends when he was honored in his hometown of Grove, Oklahoma, by naming the new Grove City Baseball Field after him nearly five decades after his high school graduation. "Jim Beauchamp Field" is home to the Qualate-Pritchard American Legion Baseball team, and the Ridgerunner Baseball team of Grove High School, where Beauchamp was an Oklahoma All-State Athlete. Beauchamp's boyhood home was across the street from where the new ballpark now stands. After the presentation, an emotional Beauchamp expressed to those present that it was the highest honor he had ever received. Coincidentally, "beau champ" in French translates as "beautiful field."

On Christmas Day, 2007, Beauchamp died following a long battle with chronic myelogenous leukemia at the age of 68.

In his honor, the Atlanta Braves wore a memorial patch emblazoned with his nickname, "Beach", during the 2008 season.

He was survived by his wife Pam; five children Kash, Tim, Ann Rene, Shanna and Lauren; six grandchildren; sister Patti Crockett; sister-in-law Kay Beauchamp; and stepmother Lee Jean Beauchamp.
