= Tommy Rowland =

American football player

Tommy Rowland was a Star Defensive Tackle/End for the University of Nevada Las Vegas from 1968 to 1971. He played pro football two years with the Las Vegas Casinos (1972-1973).

He started every game in his four-year career at UNLV, led the team in tackles in 1969 (125) and 1971 (134) from the defensive line, recorded 37 career sacks, and was named MVP of the Defense in 1970 and 1971.

He was invited to NFL camp by the Minnesota Vikings and played entire pre-season. He was offered a free agent contract by the New York Jets in 1975.

He was elected into the UNLV Athletic Hall of Fame in 1994. He was elected into the Arvin High School Athletic Hall of Fame in 2010. Was elected into the Southern Nevada Football Coaches Association Hall of Fame in 2011 as a coach.
