= Harry Parker (baseball) =

American baseball player (1947–2012)

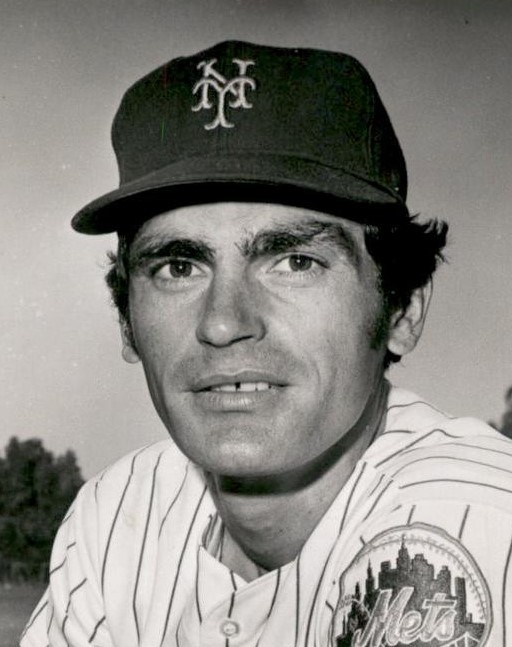
- Pitcher
- Born: September 14, 1947; Highland, Illinois, U.S.
- Died: May 29, 2012 (aged 64); Richmond, Virginia, U.S.
- Batted: Right Threw: Right

MLB debut
- August 8, 1970, for the St. Louis Cardinals

Last MLB appearance
- September 14, 1976, for the Cleveland Indians

Career statistics
- Win–loss record: 15–21
- Earned run average: 3.85
- Strikeouts: 172
- Stats at Baseball Reference

Teams
- St. Louis Cardinals (1970–1971); New York Mets (1973–1975); Cleveland Indians (1976)

Harry William Parker (September 14, 1947 – May 29, 2012) was an American professional pitcher in Major League Baseball who played in parts of six seasons spanning 1970 to 1976. Listed at 6 feet 3 inches (191 cm), 190 pounds (86 kg), Parker batted and threw right-handed. He was born in Highland, Illinois and attended Collinsville High School.

Parker posted a 15–21 record and a 3.85 earned run average in 128 pitching appearances, while playing for the St. Louis Cardinals, New York Mets and Cleveland Indians.

He was traded with Jim Beauchamp, Chuck Taylor and Chip Coulter from the Cardinals to the New York Mets for Art Shamsky, Jim Bibby, Rich Folkers and Charlie Hudson on October 18, 1971. His most productive season came in 1973, when he went 8–4 with a 3.35 ERA and 63 strikeouts in 96 2/3 innings of work to become an integral contributor for the Mets' National League pennant run. He appeared once in the National League Championship Series (NLCS) and three times in the World Series and was the losing pitcher once in each of the two postseason rounds. He surrendered a twelfth-inning one-out solo home run to Pete Rose that won Game 4 of the NLCS for the Cincinnati Reds. In the eleventh inning of Game 3 of the Fall Classic, Parker allowed a one-out walk to Ted Kubiak who advanced to second base on a Jerry Grote passed ball when Ángel Mangual struck out and scored the Oakland Athletics' winning run on Bert Campaneris' single to center field.

He also had a 69–54 mark and a 3.31 ERA in eight minor league seasons between 1965 and 1973.
