= Arvin Union School District =

School district in California, United States

Address
- 737 Bear Mountain Boulevard Arvin, California, 93203; United States

District information
- Type: Public
- Motto: Every child learning everyday no matter what it takes
- Grades: K–8
- Superintendent: Georgia Rhett
- Schools: Sierra Vista, Bear Mountain, El Camino Real, and Haven Drive
- NCES District ID: 0603270

Students and staff
- Students: 3,024
- Teachers: 126.8 (FTE)
- Staff: 171.41 (FTE)
- Student–teacher ratio: 23.85:1

Other information
- Website: www.arvinschools.com

Arvin Union School District is a public school district based in Kern County, California.

There are four schools in the district.
