= Arvin, California =

City in California, United States

- City
- City of Arvin
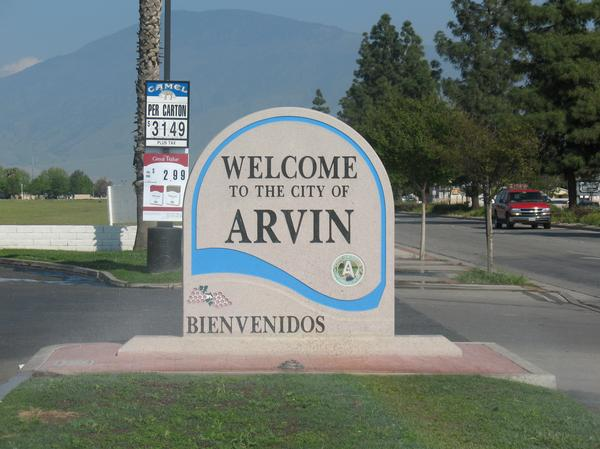
- "Welcome to Arvin" sign

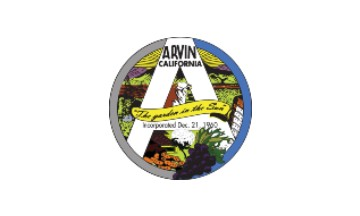
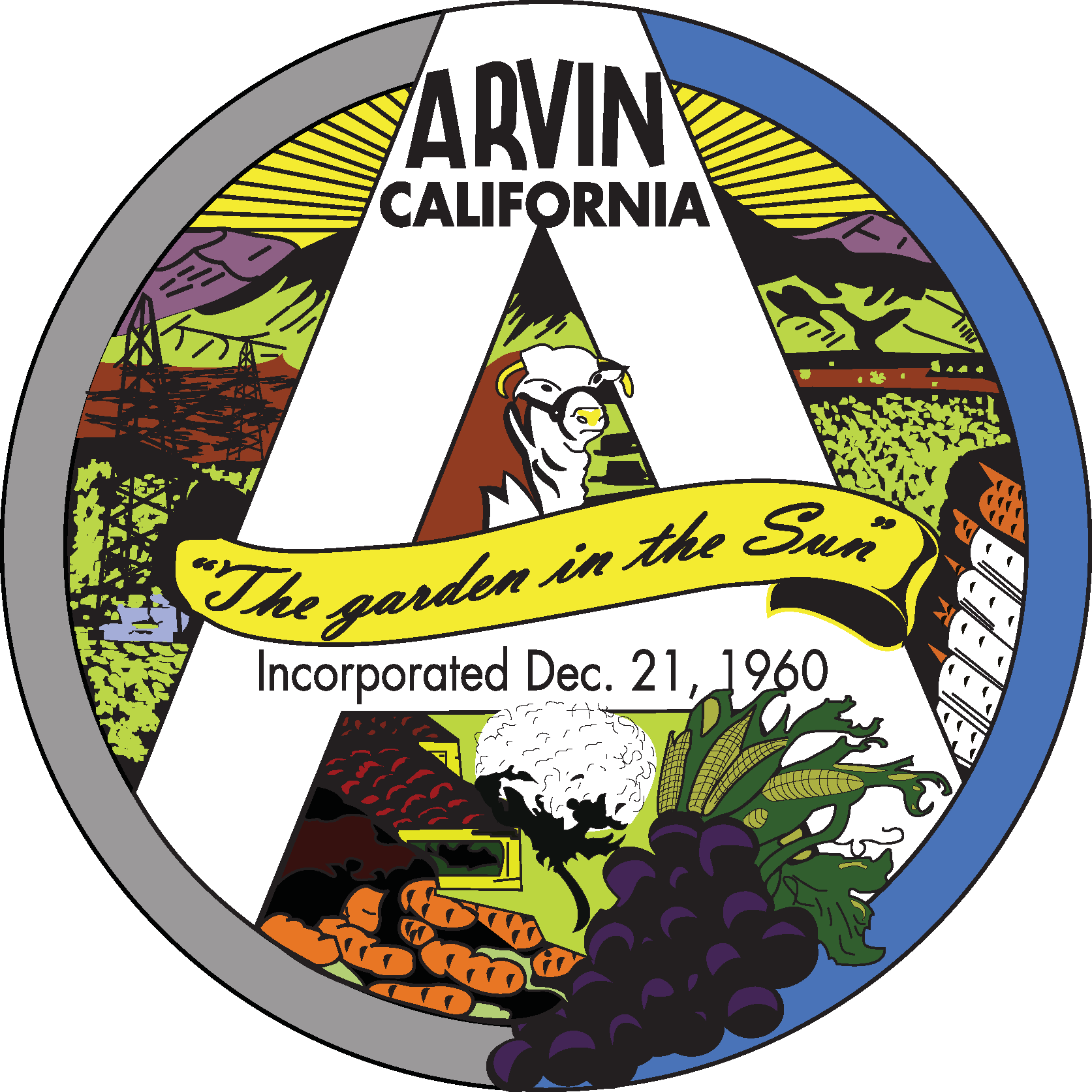
- Flag Seal
- Mottoes: "A Garden in the Sun", "The Best Place on Earth"
- Interactive map of Arvin, California
- Location within California Location within the United States
- Coordinates: 35°11′40″N 118°49′50″W
- Country: United States
- State: California
- County: Kern
- Incorporated: December 21, 1960
- Named for: Arvin Richardson

Government
  - Mayor: Olivia Trujillo
  - State senator: Melissa Hurtado (D)
  - Assemblymember: Jasmeet Bains (D)
  - U. S. rep.: David Valadao (R)

Area
  - Total: 4.82 sq mi (12.48 km^{2})
  - Land: 4.82 sq mi (12.48 km^{2})
  - Water: 0 sq mi (0.00 km^{2})
- Elevation: 420 ft (130 m)

Population (2020)
  - Total: 19,495
  - Density: 4,045.1/sq mi (1,561.84/km^{2})
- Time zone: UTC-08:00 (PST)
  - Summer (DST): UTC-07:00 (PDT)
- ZIP code: 93203
- Area code: 661
- FIPS code: 06-02924
- GNIS feature ID: 2409738
- Website: www.arvin.org

Arvin is a city in Kern County, California, United States. Arvin is located 15 miles (24 km) southeast of Bakersfield, at an elevation of 449 feet (137 m). As of the 2020 census, the population was 19,495, up from 19,304 at the 2010 census.

In 2007, the United States Environmental Protection Agency (EPA) listed Arvin as having the highest levels of smog of any community in the United States. The city's level of ozone, smog's primary component, exceeded the EPA's acceptable limits on an average of 73 days per year between 2004 and 2006.

Wired telephone numbers in Arvin follow the format (661) 854-xxxx or (661) 855-xxxx and the ZIP Code is 93203.

== History ==
Property sales of lots in present-day Arvin began in 1906. The Arvin Post Office was established in 1914 and the community incorporated as a city in 1960. The city was named after Arvin Richardson, who was the son of one of the original settling families from San Bernardino. Birdie Heard petitioned for the addition of the post office in 1914 and submitted proposed names, including Bear Mountain, Walnut, and Arvin. Officials in Washington, D.C., chose Arvin as it was the only proposed name which was not already in use in California. Birdie was the city's first postmaster. She initially set up the post office in her living room, but it was later moved to the general store owned by the Staples family. The in-store post office was also the area's first informal library until an official branch of the Kern County Library system was established in 1927.

Pedro Subia, a Mexican striker in the California agricultural strikes of 1933, was murdered at a strike in Arvin.

The Mountain View Oil Field, which underlies the town and much of the surrounding area, was discovered in 1933 and developed extensively in the 1930s. Many oil wells still surround the town; some are slant-drilled to reach formations directly underneath inhabited areas.

In the 1930s and 1940s the area east of Arvin became popular for recreational gliding and soaring, and the hillsides of the Tejon Ranch were used annually for a Western Soaring Championship in the spring. These significant events were later memorialized as a National Landmark of Soaring by the National Soaring Museum in 2000.

The Arvin Tiller started publication in 1939 and Arvin High School was built in 1949. The city was nearly destroyed on July 21, 1952, during the M7.3 Kern County earthquake (a rupture of the White Wolf Fault). Arvin suffered further damage on December 20, 1977, when a dust storm hit the area.

The Arvin Migratory Labor Camp was the first federally operated farm labor camp opened by the Farm Security Administration in 1937, one of many New Deal programs created during the presidency of Franklin D. Roosevelt to respond to the Great Depression. This agricultural camp was considered a model, and was built by the Resettlement Administration.

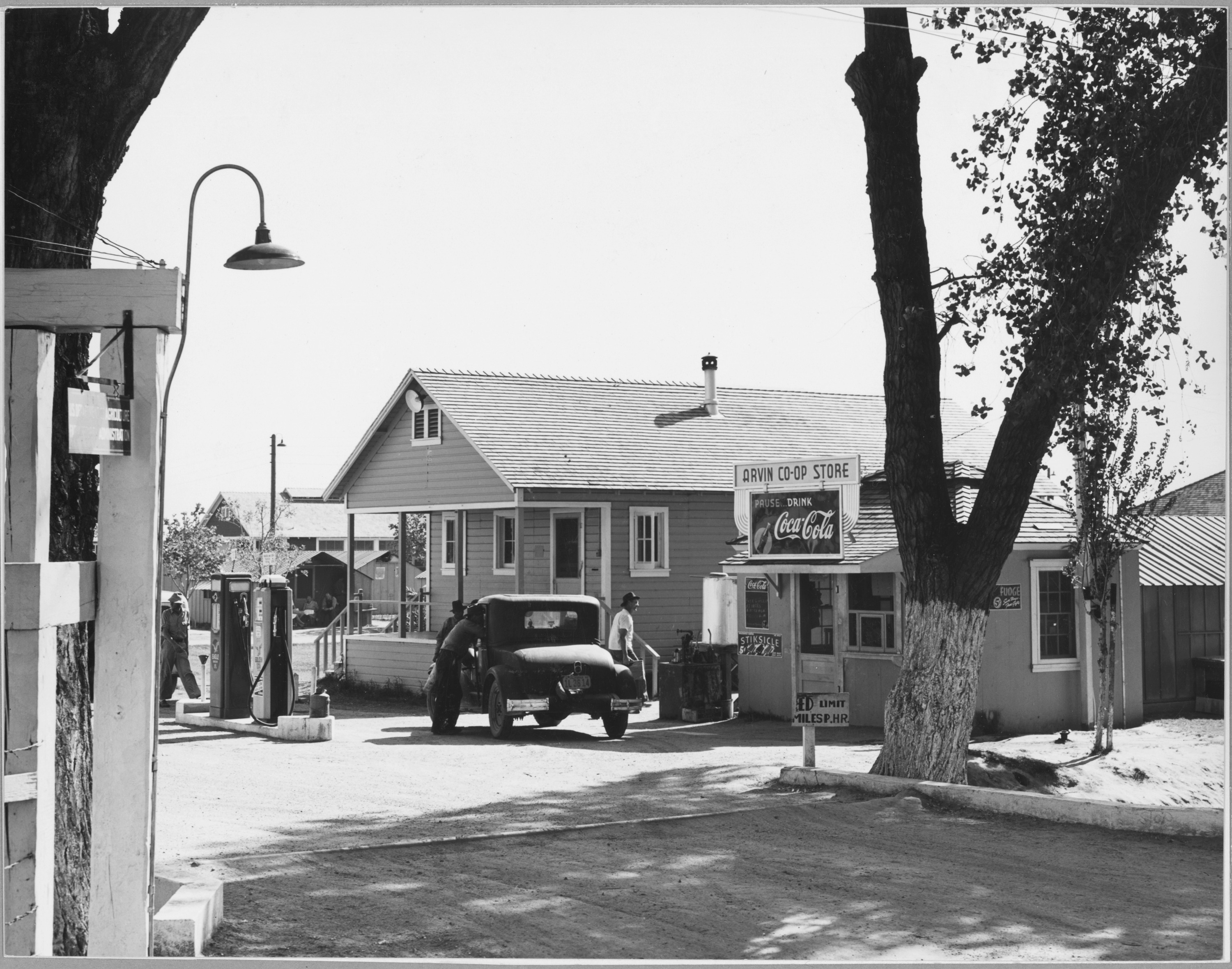
Entrance of the Arvin Farm Labor Camp, 1940

== Geography ==
According to the United States Census Bureau, the city has a total area of 4.8 square miles (12 km^{2}), all land.

=== Climate ===
According to the Köppen Climate Classification system, Arvin has a semi-arid climate, abbreviated "BSk" on climate maps.

== Demographics ==
Historical population
Census	Pop.	Note	%±
1940	4,042		—
1950	5,007		23.9%
1970	5,199		—
1980	6,863		32.0%
1990	9,286		35.3%
2000	12,956		39.5%
2010	19,304		49.0%
2020	19,495		1.0%
US Census; 1860–1870 1880-1890; 1900 1910 1920; 1930 1940 1950; 1960 1970 1980; 1990 2000 2010; 2020

=== Racial and ethnic composition ===
Arvin city, California – Racial and ethnic composition Note: the US Census treats Hispanic/Latino as an ethnic category. This table excludes Latinos from the racial categories and assigns them to a separate category. Hispanics/Latinos may be of any race.
Race / Ethnicity (NH = Non-Hispanic)	Pop 2000	Pop 2010	Pop 2020	% 2000	% 2010	% 2020
White alone (NH)	1,276	985	766	9.85%	5.10%	3.93%
Black or African American alone (NH)	68	102	153	0.52%	0.53%	0.78%
Native American or Alaska Native alone (NH)	33	41	17	0.25%	0.21%	0.09%
Asian alone (NH)	132	135	97	1.02%	0.70%	0.50%
Native Hawaiian or Pacific Islander alone (NH)	2	2	5	0.02%	0.01%	0.03%
Other race alone (NH)	16	30	32	0.12%	0.16%	0.16%
Mixed race or Multiracial (NH)	88	117	108	0.68%	0.61%	0.55%
Hispanic or Latino (any race)	11,341	17,892	18,317	87.53%	92.69%	93.96%
Total	12,956	19,304	19,495	100.00%	100.00%	100.00%

=== 2020 census ===
As of the 2020 census, Arvin had a population of 19,495 and a population density of 4,045.4 inhabitants per square mile (1,561.9/km^{2}). 97.9% of residents lived in urban areas, while 2.1% lived in rural areas. The census reported that 99.5% of residents lived in households, 0.1% lived in non-institutionalized group quarters, and 0.3% were institutionalized.

The median age was 26.4 years. 35.9% of residents were under the age of 18, 12.0% were between 18 and 24, 26.7% were between 25 and 44, 18.4% were between 45 and 64, and 7.0% were 65 years of age or older. For every 100 females there were 98.9 males, and for every 100 females age 18 and over there were 96.4 males.

There were 4,753 households, of which 64.5% had children under the age of 18 living in them. Of all households, 57.2% were married-couple households, 8.7% were cohabiting couple households, 12.4% had a male householder with no spouse or partner present, and 21.7% had a female householder with no spouse or partner present. About 8.2% of households were made up of individuals and 2.9% had someone living alone who was 65 years of age or older, and the average household size was 4.08. There were 4,198 families (88.3% of all households).

There were 4,884 housing units at an average density of 1,013.5/mi^{2} (391.3/km^{2}), of which 4,753 (97.3%) were occupied. Of the occupied units, 51.8% were owner-occupied and 48.2% were occupied by renters; the homeowner vacancy rate was 0.2% and the rental vacancy rate was 2.0%.

Racial composition as of the 2020 census
Race	Number	Percent
White	5,069	26.0%
Black or African American	178	0.9%
American Indian and Alaska Native	397	2.0%
Asian	123	0.6%
Native Hawaiian and Other Pacific Islander	6	0.0%
Some other race	10,153	52.1%
Two or more races	3,569	18.3%

=== 2023 ACS estimates ===
In 2023, the US Census Bureau estimated that 31.1% of the population were foreign-born. Of all people aged 5 or older, 16.1% spoke only English at home, 83.0% spoke Spanish, 0.0% spoke other Indo-European languages, 0.4% spoke Asian or Pacific Islander languages, and 0.4% spoke other languages. Of those aged 25 or older, 45.3% were high school graduates and 4.3% had a bachelor's degree.

The median household income was $49,984, and the per capita income was $15,302. About 27.0% of families and 31.7% of the population were below the poverty line.

== Economy ==
The economy of Arvin is primarily based on agriculture, and as such the employment statistics show seasonal variation. In March 2011, 41.9 percent of Arvin's residents were out of work, the highest of any city in Kern County.

=== Cannabis ===
In 2018, voters in Arvin passed a measure to license and tax marijuana after the legalization of the sale and distribution of cannabis in California was legalized. The measure set a 6% tax on cannabis sales and a tax of up to $6 per square foot per year on cultivation. The city issued its first license to a delivery service in June 2020. This was the first legal cannabis business in Kern County as similar measures have failed in other jurisdictions. Companies must be licensed by the local agency and the state to grow, test, or sell cannabis and each city or county may authorize none or only some of these activities. Local governments may not prohibit adults who are in compliance with state laws from growing, using, or transporting marijuana for personal use.

== Education ==
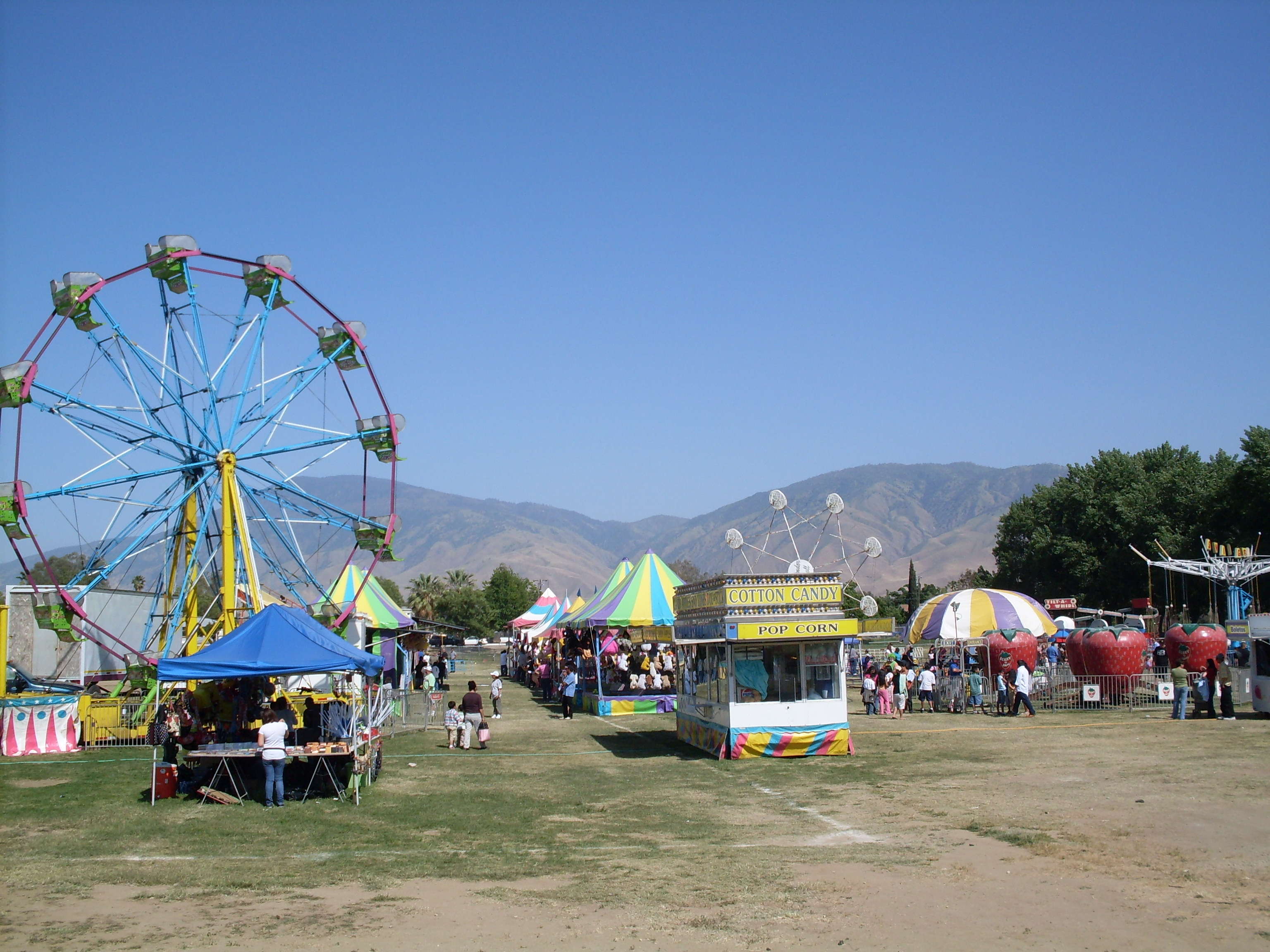
2009 Wildflower Festival

The city of Arvin is served by the Arvin Union School District and the Kern High School District. Other nearby districts include Di Giorgio School District, Vineland School District, and the Lamont School District.

The Arvin Union School District consists of Sierra Vista Elementary School, Bear Mountain Elementary School, El Camino Real Elementary School, Haven Drive Middle School, and Arvin State Preschool. The land for the Haven Drive campus was acquired in 1943. Sierra Vista and Haven Drive are the two oldest schools in Arvin. The district serves preschool to eighth grade students. The Arvin Union School District also serves the community with the Arvin Family Resource Center.

The Kern High School District serves grades 9–12 in Arvin. It operates Arvin High School, which also services students from the surrounding rural areas and the nearby town of Lamont.

Bakersfield College, a community college, serves the community of Arvin with a satellite campus at the Arvin Educational Center, approximately 22 miles south of the main campus in Bakersfield, California.

== Public safety ==
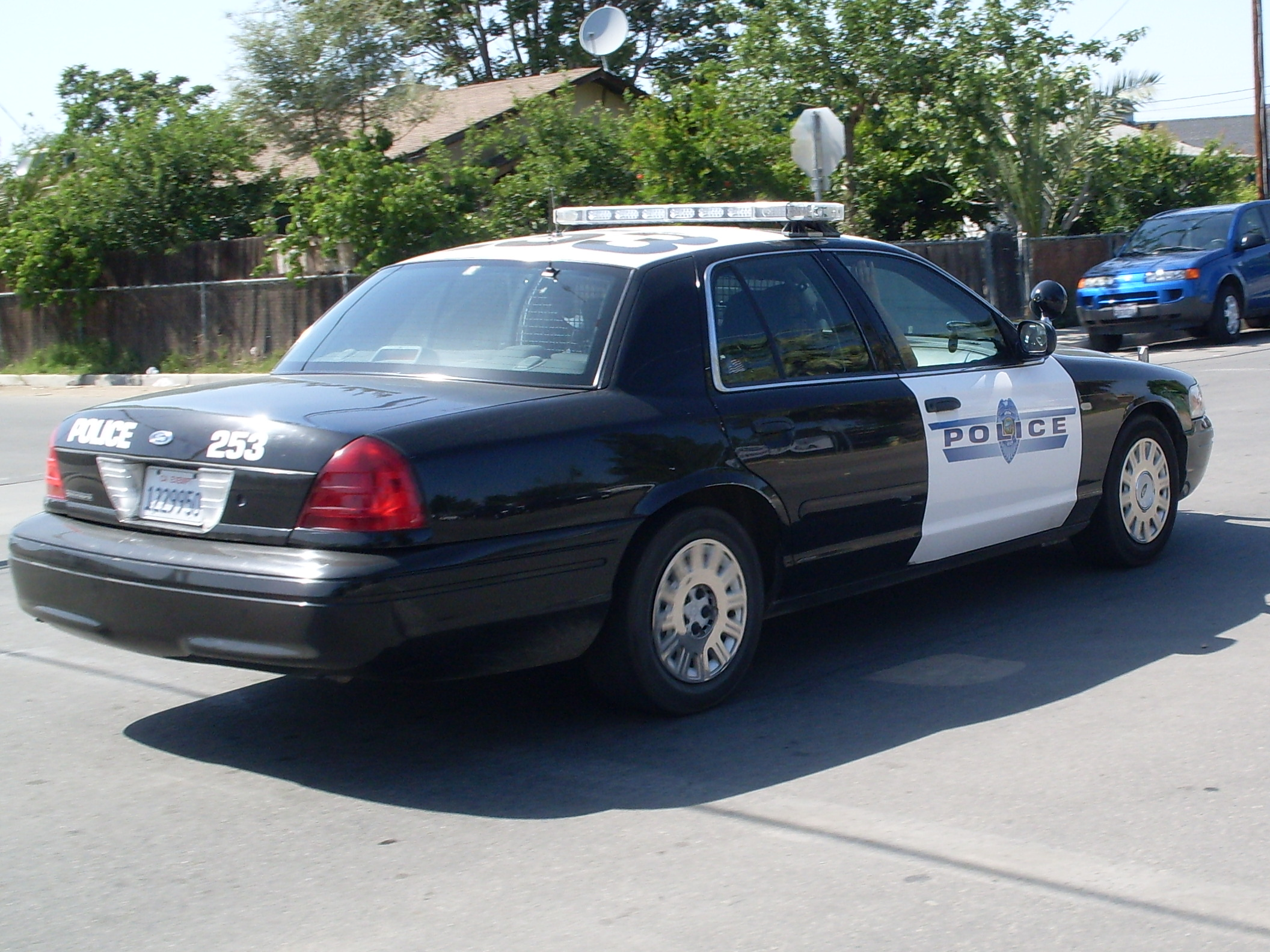
Arvin Police hybrid Cruiser

The city of Arvin has its own police department. In January 2008, the city purchased six hybrid police vehicles with a grant by the San Joaquin Valley Air Pollution Control District. The city also purchased six hybrid SUVs in December 2008 with a grant by the San Joaquin Valley Air Quality District. Station 54 of the Kern County Fire Department is responsible for fire prevention services.

=== Crime statistics ===
2010

- Population: 15,410
- Violent crime: 187
- Murder and non-negligent manslaughter: 10
- Forcible rape: 1
- Robbery: 19
- Aggravated assault: 167
- Property crime: 500
- Burglary: 186
- Larceny: 232
- Motor vehicle theft: 82
- Arson: 14

=== Full-time law enforcement employees ===
2010

- Population: 15,410
- Total law enforcement employees: 27
- Total Officers: 18
- Total Civilians: 9
