= John Tarver =

American football player (born 1949)

No. 36, 49
- Position: Running back

Personal information
- Born: January 1, 1949 (age 77); Bakersfield, California, U.S.
- Listed height: 6 ft 3 in (1.91 m)
- Listed weight: 227 lb (103 kg)

Career information
- High school: Arvin (CA)
- College: Colorado
- NFL draft: 1972: 7th round, 166th overall pick

Career history
- New England Patriots (1972–1974); Philadelphia Eagles (1975)

Career NFL statistics
- Rushing attempts-yards: 162-574
- Receptions-yards: 34-214
- Touchdowns: 8
- Stats at Pro Football Reference

John Tarver (born January 1, 1949) is an American former professional football player who was a running back in the National Football League (NFL) from 1972 to 1975. He played for three seasons with the New England Patriots, and went on to play for the Philadelphia Eagles. He played college football for the Colorado Buffaloes.

== Early life and education ==
Tarver was born in Bakersfield, California, as one of nine children. He was an outstanding athlete at Arvin High School.

== College career ==
Tarver played football at Bakersfield Junior College. He then transferred to the University of Colorado Boulder, where he played football for the Buffaloes. In two seasons, Tarver rushed 1,327 yards. He played in the 1971 Liberty Bowl, the 1972 Bluebonnet Bowl, and the 1972 College All-Star Game. He was voted the team's "unheralded senior".

== Professional career ==
He was selected by the New England Patriots in the seventh round (166th overall) of the 1972 NFL draft out of Colorado. He played four seasons for the Patriots (1972–1974) and the Philadelphia Eagles (1975).

In 1973, Tarver was the second best rusher for the Patriots with 321 yards and four touchdowns, despite being sidelined for five games due to injury.

== Personal life ==
After retiring from professional football, Tarver worked in insurance and investments. His son Shon played basketball for the UCLA Bruins. Another son, Seth, played basketball for the Idaho Stampede.
