= 1969 New York Mets season =

Major League Baseball season

1969 New York Mets
- World Series champions National League champions National League East champions
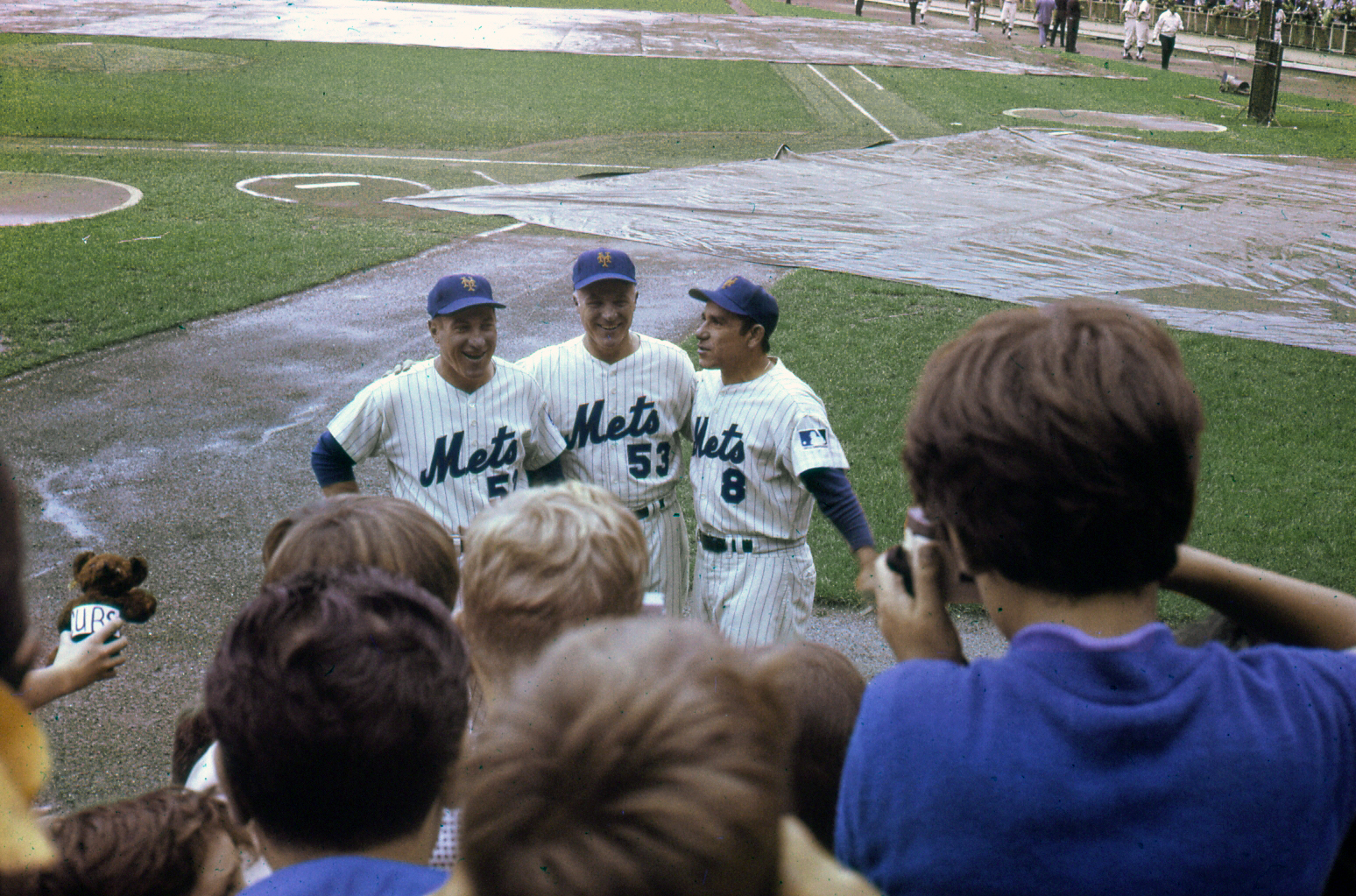
- Bullpen coach Joe Pignatano, third base coach Eddie Yost, and first base coach Yogi Berra in September 1969.
- League: National League
- Division: East
- Ballpark: Shea Stadium
- City: Flushing, Queens, NY, U.S.
- Record: 100–62 (.617)
- Divisional place: 1st
- Owners: Joan Whitney Payson
- General manager: Johnny Murphy
- Manager: Gil Hodges
- Television: WOR-TV (Lindsey Nelson, Bob Murphy, Ralph Kiner)
- Radio: WJRZ/WABC-FM (Nelson, Murphy, Kiner)
- Stats: ESPN.com; Baseball Reference

The 1969 New York Mets season was the team's 8th as a Major League Baseball (MLB) franchise and culminated when they won the World Series over the Baltimore Orioles. They played their home games at Shea Stadium and were managed by Gil Hodges. The team is often referred to as the "Amazin' Mets" (a nickname coined by Casey Stengel, who managed the team from their inaugural season to 1965) or the "Miracle Mets".

The 1969 season was the first season of divisional play in MLB. The Mets were assigned to the newly created National League East. In their seven previous seasons, the Mets had never finished higher than ninth place in the ten-team National League and had never had a winning season. They lost at least one hundred games in five of the seasons. However, they overcame mid-season difficulties while the division leaders for much of the season, the Chicago Cubs, suffered a late-season collapse. The Mets finished 100–62, eight games ahead of the Cubs. They went on to defeat the National League West champion Atlanta Braves three games to none in the inaugural NLCS, and defeated the American League champion Orioles in five games. First baseman Donn Clendenon was named the World Series' Most Valuable Player on the strength of his .357 batting average, three home runs, and four runs batted in.

On Saturday, August 22, 2009, many of the surviving members of the 1969 championship team reunited at the Mets' present park, Citi Field.

== Offseason ==
- October 16, 1968: Sold Don Bosch to the Montreal Expos

=== Trades ===
Date	Details
December, 1968	Jerry Buchek traded to the St. Louis Cardinals for Jim Cosman
December 2, 1968	Drafted Wayne Garrett from the Atlanta Braves in the 1968 rule 5 draft Tommie Reynolds drafted by the Oakland Athletics in the 1968 rule 5 draft Juan Rios drafted by the Montreal Expos in the 1968 rule 5 draft Bill Short drafted by the Cincinnati Reds in the 1968 rule 5 draft
February 5, 1969	Greg Goossen and cash traded to the Seattle Pilots for a player to be named later. Received Jim Gosger three months later to complete the trade.

== Spring training ==
The Mets held spring training at Al Lang Stadium in St. Petersburg, Florida, for the 8th season.

== Regular season ==
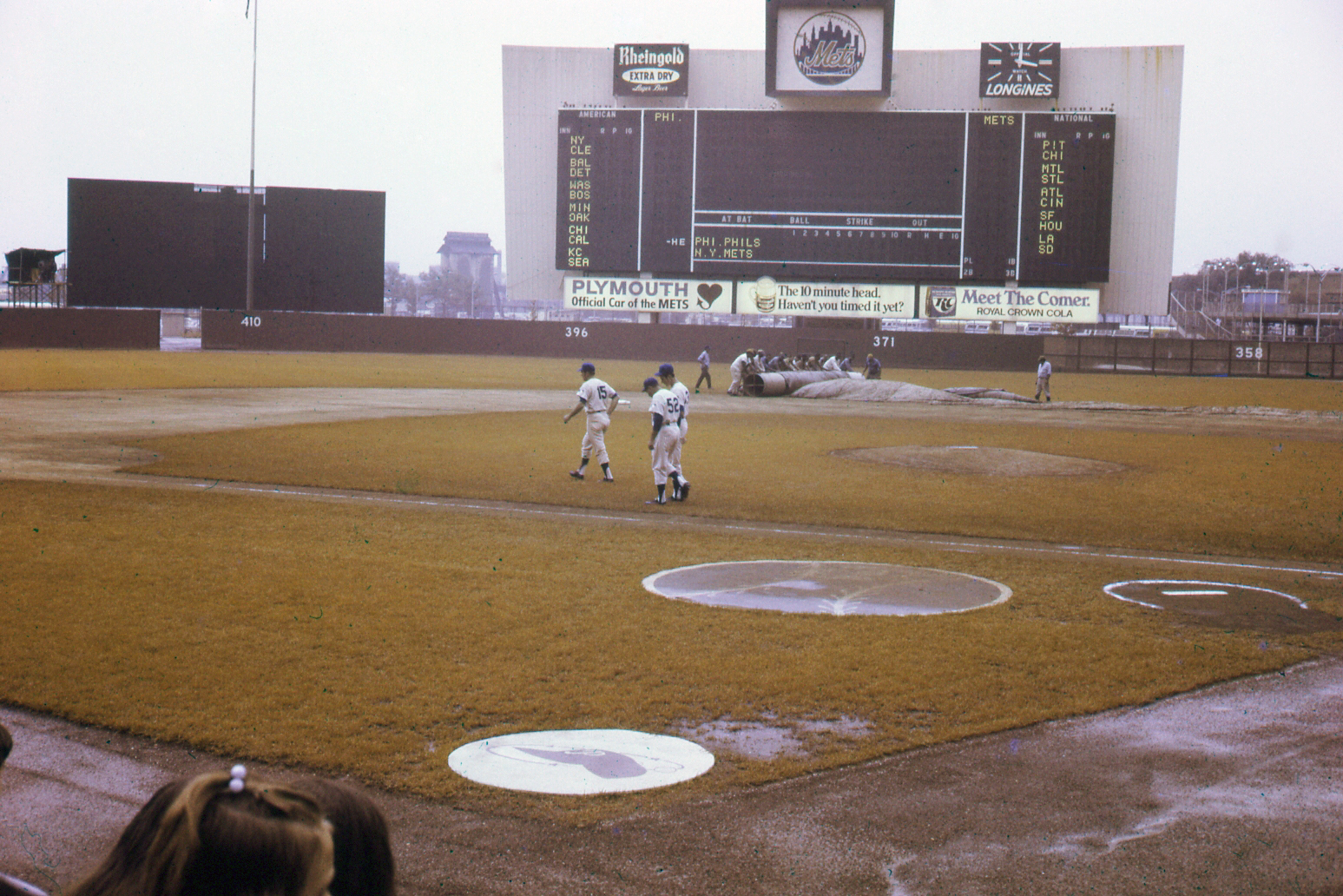
Shea Stadium prior to a game in September 1969.

The Mets had never finished higher than ninth place in a ten-team league in their first seven seasons. As an expansion team, they went 40–120 in 1962, the most losses by an MLB team in one season in the 20th century, and the 1962 Mets' .250 winning percentage was higher than only the .248 posted by the 1935 Boston Braves.

The Mets never had been over .500 after the ninth game of any season. Seven years after their disastrous inaugural season, "The Amazin' Mets" (as nicknamed by previous manager Casey Stengel) won the World Series, the first expansion team to do so.

1969 was the first year of divisional baseball, precipitated by the expansion of each league from 10 to 12 teams. The Kansas City Royals and Seattle Pilots joined the American League. The San Diego Padres and Montreal Expos joined the National League. Before 1969, the first place team in each league advanced directly to the World Series. Under the new structure, each league was divided into East and West divisions, each comprising six teams, with the divisional winners facing off in a best-of-five playoff for the right to represent their league in the World Series. The Mets were slotted into the National League East division, along with the Chicago Cubs, Philadelphia Phillies, Pittsburgh Pirates, expansion Montreal Expos, and the St. Louis Cardinals, who had previously won the World Series in 1964 and 1967 and lost in 1968. For the first time since joining the National League in 1962, the Mets could finish no lower than 6th. The New York Times journalist, Joe Durso, predicted the Mets would finish 4th in the East, ahead of the Pirates and the Expos.

On April 8, with 44,541 fans in attendance at Shea Stadium, the Mets and the Expos played the first international baseball game in MLB history. The Mets had lost seven straight Opening Day games since joining the National League in 1962. That dubious record reached eight when the Expos prevailed in an 11–10 slugfest, despite the Mets scoring four runs with two down in the bottom of the ninth, highlighted by a pinch hit three-run home run by Duffy Dyer. Apparently, this was axiomatic Mets baseball, as one columnist described the Mets as "masters of the lingering death."

The Mets took the next two games from the Expos, but then lost six of the following 7 games, bringing their record to 3–7. After a 9–14 start, the Mets won 9 of their next 13 games, including consecutive shutouts in late April against the Cubs and Expos. When Tom Seaver shut out the Atlanta Braves 5–0 on May 21, the Mets were 18–18, their best start in franchise history. But the Mets lost their next five games, starting with a 15–3 drubbing from the Braves, followed by a 3-game sweep by the Houston Astros, who outscored the Mets 18–4, and finishing with a loss at Shea Stadium to the lowly San Diego Padres. At the end of play on May 27, the Mets' record stood at 18–23. Then, in late May, the Mets reeled off a club-record 11 straight wins, which included three walk-off wins and dominant pitching, as the Mets pitching staff yielded a stingy 2-runs per game. Starting with their 42nd game, the Mets went 82–39 (a .678 winning percentage), including an astonishing 38–11 in their last 49 games.

Despite that performance, the Mets suffered two mid-season three-game series sweeps at the hands of the Astros, who manhandled the Mets all season, taking 10 of the 12 games the teams played. They were also no-hit by Bob Moose of the Pittsburgh Pirates on September 20, only five days after becoming the first major league team to strike out 19 times in a nine-inning game, a game they won, 4–3, on a pair of two-run home runs by Ron Swoboda, against the Cardinals' Steve Carlton.

Trailing the Chicago Cubs for much of the season, the Mets found themselves in third place and 10 games back on August 14 but they won 14 of their last 17 games during August, and 24 of their 32 games during September and October, to surge past the Cubs, finishing 100–62, eight games ahead of them. That 18 game differential, recovering from being 10 games behind the Cubs to finish 8 games ahead of them, is one of the largest turnarounds in MLB history.

== Season standings ==
=== National League East ===
NL East
Team	W	L	Pct.	GB	Home	Road
New York Mets	100	62	.617	—	52‍–‍30	48‍–‍32
Chicago Cubs	92	70	.568	8	49‍–‍32	43‍–‍38
Pittsburgh Pirates	88	74	.543	12	47‍–‍34	41‍–‍40
St. Louis Cardinals	87	75	.537	13	42‍–‍38	45‍–‍37
Philadelphia Phillies	63	99	.389	37	30‍–‍51	33‍–‍48
Montreal Expos	52	110	.321	48	24‍–‍57	28‍–‍53

=== Record vs. opponents ===
	Record			Games Left		
Opponent	Home	Road	Total	Home	Road	Total
NL East
Chicago Cubs	5–4	5–4	10–8	–	–	–
Montreal Expos	7–2	6–3	13–5	–	–	–
Philadelphia Phillies	5–4	7–2	12–6	–	–	–
Pittsburgh Pirates	4–5	6–3	10–8	–	–	–
St. Louis Cardinals	6–4	6–2	12–6	–	–	–
NL West
Atlanta Braves	4–2	4–2	8–4	–	–	–
Cincinnati Reds	3–3	3–3	6–6	–	–	–
Houston Astros	2–4	0–6	2–10	–	–	–
Los Angeles Dodgers	6–0	2–4	8–4	–	–	–
San Diego Padres	5–1	6–0	11–1	–	–	–
San Francisco Giants	5–1	3–3	8–4	–	–	–
Grand Totals	52–30	48–32	100–62	–	–	–

Month	Games	Won	Lost	Pct.
April	20	9	11	.450
May	24	12	12	.500
June	28	19	9	.679
July	27	15	12	.556
August	31	21	10	.677
September	30	23	7	.767
October	2	1	1	.500
Totals	162	100	62	.617

== Schedule and results ==
=== Regular season ===
1969 Regular Season Game Log
Overall: 100–62 (Home: 52–30; Road: 48–32)
April: 9–11 (Home: 4–8; Road: 5–3)

#	Date	Opponent	Score	Win	Loss	Save	Attendance	Stadium	Record	Report	Rank	GB		
1	April 8	Expos	10–11	Shaw (1–0)	Koonce (0–1)	Sembera (1)	44,541	Shea Stadium	0–1	Boxscore	4	−1	2:05 PM EST	WOR-TV
2	April 9	Expos	9–5	McGraw (1–0)	Stoneman (0–1)	Ryan (1)	13,827	Shea Stadium	1–1	Boxscore	3	−1	2:05 PM EST	WOR-TV
3	April 10	Expos	4–2	Gentry (1–0)	Jaster (0–1)	Koonce (1)	8,608	Shea Stadium	2–1	Boxscore	3	−1	2:05 PM EST	WOR-TV
4	April 11	Cardinals	5–6		Koosman (0–1)		12,591	Shea Stadium	2–2	Boxscore	3	−2		WOR-TV
5	April 12	Cardinals	0–1		Cardwell (0–1)		19,510	Shea Stadium	2–3	Boxscore	3	−2		WOR-TV
6	April 13	Cardinals	1–3		Seaver (0–1)		25,314	Shea Stadium	2–4	Boxscore	4	−3		WOR-TV
7	April 14	@ Phillies	1–5		McAndrew (0–1)		13,070	Connie Mack Stadium	2–5	Boxscore	5	−4	7:35 PM EST	WOR-TV
8	April 15	@ Phillies	6–3	Gentry (2–0)		Koonce (2)	2,880	Connie Mack Stadium	3–5	Boxscore	4	−4	7:35 PM EST	WOR-TV
9	April 16	@ Pirates	3–11		Koosman (0–2)		7,666	Forbes Field	3–6	Boxscore	5	−5	8:05 PM EST	WOR-TV
10	April 17	@ Pirates	0–4		Cardwell (0–2)		8,097	Forbes Field	3–7	Boxscore	5	−6	8:05 PM EST	WOR-TV
—	April 18	@ Cardinals	Postponed (rain); rescheduled for July 1					Busch Memorial Stadium				–6		
11	April 19	@ Cardinals	2–1	Seaver (1–1)			20,716	Busch Memorial Stadium	4–7	Boxscore	4	−6		WOR-TV
12	April 20	@ Cardinals	11–3	Ryan (1–0)		Koonce (3)	19,065	Busch Memorial Stadium	5–7	Boxscore	3	−5 1/2		WOR-TV
13	April 21	Phillies	1–2 (11)		Taylor (0–1)		9,286	Shea Stadium	5–8	Boxscore	3	−6		WOR-TV
	April 22	Phillies	Postponed (rain); rescheduled for September 5					Shea Stadium				−5		
14	April 23	Pirates	2–0	Koosman (1–2)			7,274	Shea Stadium	6–8	Boxscore	3	−4 1/2		WOR-TV
—	April 24	Pirates	Postponed (rain); rescheduled for September 19					Shea Stadium				–5		
15	April 25	Cubs	1–3	Jenkins (3–1)	Seaver (1–2)		18,548	Shea Stadium	6–9	Boxscore	4	−5		WOR-TV
16	April 26	Cubs	3–9		Cardwell (0–3)		16,252	Shea Stadium	6–10	Boxscore	5	−6		WOR-TV
17 (1)	April 27	Cubs	6–8		Koonce (0–2)		N/A	Shea Stadium	6–11	Boxscore	4	−6		WOR-TV
18 (2)	April 27	Cubs	3–0	McGraw (2–0)			37,437	Shea Stadium	7–11	Boxscore	4	−6		WOR-TV
19	April 29	@ Expos	2–0	Ryan (2–0)			8,577	Jarry Park	8–11	Boxscore	3	−6 1/2	4:05 PM EDT	
20	April 30	@ Expos	2–1	Seaver (2–2)			19,024	Jarry Park	9–11	Boxscore	3	−5 1/2	8:05 PM EDT	WOR-TV

May: 12–12 (Home: 7–5; Road: 5–7)

#	Date	Opponent	Score	Win	Loss	Save	Attendance	Stadium	Record	Report	Rank	GB		
21	May 1	@ Expos	2–3		Cardwell (0–4)		7,741	Jarry Park	9–12	Boxscore	4	−6	4:05 PM EDT	
22	May 2	@ Cubs	4–6		Gentry (2–1)		14,702	Wrigley Field	9–13	Boxscore	5	−7	2:10 p.m. EDT	
23	May 3	@ Cubs	2–3		Koonce (0–3)		23,228	Wrigley Field	9–14	Boxscore	5	−8	2:10 p.m. EDT	WOR-TV
24 (1)	May 4	@ Cubs	3–2	Seaver (3–2)			N/A	Wrigley Field	10–14	Boxscore	4	−6	1:55 p.m. EDT	WOR-TV
25 (2)	May 4	@ Cubs	3–2	McGraw (3–0)			40,484	Wrigley Field	11–14	Boxscore	4	−6		WOR-TV
26	May 6	Reds	8–1	Cardwell (1–4)			12,291	Shea Stadium	12–14	Boxscore	4	−6		WOR-TV
27	May 7	Reds	0–3		Gentry (2–2)		9,242	Shea Stadium	12–15	Boxscore	4	−6		WOR-TV
—	May 9	Astros	Postponed (rain); rescheduled for July 30					Shea Stadium				–5		
28	May 10	Astros	3–1	Seaver (4–2)			14,981	Shea Stadium	13–15	Boxscore	3	−5		WOR-TV
29	May 11	Astros	1–4		Cardwell (1–5)		N/A	Shea Stadium	13–16	Boxscore	3	−5 1/2		WOR-TV
30	May 11	Astros	11–7	Koonce (1–3)			19,456	Shea Stadium	14–16	Boxscore	3	−5 1/2		WOR-TV
31	May 13	Braves	3–4	Reed (5–1)	Gentry (2–3)	Upshaw (8)	12,332	Shea Stadium	14–17	Boxscore	3	−7	8:00 p.m. EDT	WOR-TV
32	May 14	Braves	9–3	Seaver (5–2)	Niekro (5–2)	Taylor (1)	15,365	Shea Stadium	15–17	Boxscore	3	−7	8:00 p.m. EDT	WOR-TV
33	May 15	Braves	5–6	Jarvis (3–2)	Cardwell (1–6)	Upshaw (9)	14,370	Shea Stadium	15–18	Boxscore	3	−7 1/2	2:00 p.m. EDT	
34	May 16	@ Reds	10–9	Koonce (2–3)			11,736	Crosley Field	16–18	Boxscore	3	−7 1/2	8:05 PM EDT	WOR-TV
35	May 17	@ Reds	11–3	Gentry (3–3)			8,925	Crosley Field	17–18	Boxscore	3	−6 1/2	8:05 PM EDT	WOR-TV
—	May 18	@ Reds	Postponed (rain); rescheduled for August 5					Crosley Field				–6		
36	May 21	@ Braves	5–0	Seaver (6–2)	Niekro (5–3)	—	14,669	Atlanta Stadium	18–18	Boxscore	3	−5 1/2	8:05 p.m. EDT	WOR-TV
37	May 22	@ Braves	3–15	Jarvis (4–2)	McGraw (3–1)	Stone (1)	12,574	Atlanta Stadium	18–19	Boxscore	3	−6 1/2	8:05 p.m. EDT	WOR-TV
38	May 23	@ Astros	0–7		Gentry (3–4)		10,825	Astrodome	18–20	Boxscore	4	−7 1/2		WOR-TV
39	May 24	@ Astros	1–5		Koosman (1–3)		17,911	Astrodome	18–21	Boxscore	4	−8 1/2	8:30 PM EDT	WOR-TV
40	May 25	@ Astros	3–6		Seaver (6–3)		22,716	Astrodome	18–22	Boxscore	4	−9		WOR-TV
41	May 27	Padres	2–3		McAndrew (0–2)		11,772	Shea Stadium	18–23	Boxscore	4	−9		WOR-TV
42	May 28	Padres	1–0 (11)	McGraw (4–1)			11,860	Shea Stadium	19–23	Boxscore	4	−9		WOR-TV
43	May 30	Giants	4–3	Seaver (7–3)		Taylor (2)	52,272	Shea Stadium	20–23	Boxscore	3	−9		WOR-TV
44	May 31	Giants	4–2	Gentry (4–4)		McGraw (1)	32,178	Shea Stadium	21–23	Boxscore	3	−9		WOR-TV

June: 19–9 (Home: 9–5; Road: 10–4)

#	Date	Opponent	Score	Win	Loss	Save	Attendance	Stadium	Record	Report	Rank	GB		
45	June 1	Giants	5–4	Taylor (1–1)			41,294	Shea Stadium	22–23	Boxscore	3	−9		WOR-TV
46	June 2	Dodgers	2–1	Koosman (2–3)			22,600	Shea Stadium	23–23	Boxscore	3	−8 1/2		
47	June 3	Dodgers	5–2	Seaver (8–3)		McGraw (2)	24,212	Shea Stadium	24–23	Boxscore	2	−8 1/2		WOR-TV
48	June 4	Dodgers	1–0 (15)	Taylor (2–1)			31,331	Shea Stadium	25–23	Boxscore	2	−8 1/2		WOR-TV
49	June 6	@ Padres	5–3	Gentry (5–4)		Taylor (3)	11,203	San Diego Stadium	26–23	Boxscore	2	−8 1/2	11:00 PM EDT	
50	June 7	@ Padres	4–1	Koosman (3–3)			10,827	San Diego Stadium	27–23	Boxscore	2	−8		
51	June 8	@ Padres	3–2	Seaver (9–3)		Taylor (4)	8,568	San Diego Stadium	28–23	Boxscore	2	−7 1/2		WOR-TV
52	June 10	@ Giants	9–4	Cardwell (2–6)		Taylor (5)	6,038	Candlestick Park	29–23	Boxscore	2	−7	11:00 PM EDT	
53	June 11	@ Giants	2–7		Gentry (5–5)		3,935	Candlestick Park	29–24	Boxscore	2	−7	4:00 PM EDT	WOR-TV
54	June 13	@ Dodgers	0–1		Koosman (3–4)		20,042	Dodger Stadium	29–25	Boxscore	2	−8 1/2	11:00 PM EDT	
55	June 14	@ Dodgers	3–1	Seaver (10–3)		McGraw (3)	26,727	Dodger Stadium	30–25	Boxscore	2	−8 1/2	11:00 PM EDT	
56	June 15	@ Dodgers	2–3		DiLauro (0–1)		28,086	Dodger Stadium	30–26	Boxscore	2	−9	4:00 PM EDT	WOR-TV
57	June 17	@ Phillies	1–0	Gentry (6–5)			N/A	Connie Mack Stadium	31–26	Boxscore	2	−7 1/2		
58	June 17	@ Phillies	3–7		Cardwell (2–7)		17,259	Connie Mack Stadium	31–27	Boxscore	2	−7 1/2		
59	June 18	@ Phillies	2–0	Koosman (4–4)			5,608	Connie Mack Stadium	32–27	Boxscore	2	−7		WOR-TV
60	June 19	@ Phillies	6–5	Taylor (3–1)		McGraw (4)	6,871	Connie Mack Stadium	33–27	Boxscore	2	−6		WOR-TV
61	June 20	Cardinals	4–3	Ryan (3–0)		McGraw (5)	54,083	Shea Stadium	34–27	Boxscore	2	−6		WOR-TV
62	June 21	Cardinals	3–5		DiLauro (0–2)		29,628	Shea Stadium	34–28	Boxscore	2	−6		WOR-TV
63	June 22	Cardinals	5–1	Gentry (7–5)		Koonce (4)	N/A	Shea Stadium	35–28	Boxscore	2	−5		WOR-TV
64	June 22	Cardinals	1–0	Koosman (5–4)			55,862	Shea Stadium	36–28	Boxscore	2	−5		WOR-TV
65	June 24	Phillies	2–1	Seaver (11–3)			N/A	Shea Stadium	37–28	Boxscore	2	−5		WOR-TV
66	June 24	Phillies	5–0	McAndrew (1–2)		Taylor (6)	39,843	Shea Stadium	38–28	Boxscore	2	−5		WOR-TV
67	June 25	Phillies	5–6 (10)		Taylor (3–2)		27,814	Shea Stadium	38–29	Boxscore	2	−6		WOR-TV
68	June 26	Phillies	0–2		Cardwell (2–8)		15,360	Shea Stadium	38–30	Boxscore	2	−7		
69	June 27	Pirates	1–3		Koosman (5–5)		42,276	Shea Stadium	38–31	Boxscore	2	−7		WOR-TV
70	June 28	Pirates	4–7		Gentry (7–6)		48,398	Shea Stadium	38–32	Boxscore	2	−8		WOR-TV
71	June 29	Pirates	7–3	Seaver (12–3)			27,455	Shea Stadium	39–32	Boxscore	2	−8 1/2		WOR-TV
72	June 30	@ Cardinals	10–2	McAndrew (2–2)			17,476	Busch Memorial Stadium	40–32	Boxscore	2	−7 1/2	9:00 PM EDT	WOR-TV

July: 15–12 (Home: 6–7; Road: 9–5)

#	Date	Opponent	Score	Win	Loss	Save	Attendance	Stadium	Record	Report	Rank	GB			
73	July 1	@ Cardinals	1–4		Ryan (3–1)		N/A	Busch Memorial Stadium	40–33	Boxscore	2	−8	6:00 PM EDT	WOR-TV	
74	July 1	@ Cardinals	5–8		DiLauro (0–3)		19,799	Busch Memorial Stadium	40–34	Boxscore	2	−8	8:29 PM EDT	WOR-TV	
75	July 2	@ Cardinals	6–4 (14)	McGraw (5–1)			14,928	Busch Memorial Stadium	41–34	Boxscore	2	−8	9:00 PM EDT	WOR-TV	
76	July 3	@ Cardinals	8–1	Gentry (8–6)			11,070	Busch Memorial Stadium	42–34	Boxscore	2	−8			
77	July 4	@ Pirates	11–6	Seaver (13–3)		Koonce (5)	N/A	Forbes Field	43–34	Boxscore	2	−7 1/2	10:35 AM EDT	WOR-TV	
78	July 4	@ Pirates	9–2	Cardwell (3–8)			17,631	Forbes Field	44–34	Boxscore	2	−7 1/2	1:57 PM EDT	WOR-TV	
—	July 5	@ Pirates	Postponed (rain); rescheduled for September 12					Forbes Field				–6 1/2			
79	July 6	@ Pirates	8–7	Taylor (4–2)		Koonce (6)	11,552	Forbes Field	45–34	Boxscore	2	−5 1/2	1:35 PM EDT	WOR-TV	
80	July 8	Cubs	4–3	Koosman (6–5)	Jenkins (11–6)		55,096	Shea Stadium	46–34	Boxscore	2	−4 1/2		WOR-TV	
81	July 9	Cubs	4–0	Seaver (14–3)			50,709	Shea Stadium	47–34	Boxscore	2	−3 1/2		WOR-TV	
82	July 10	Cubs	2–6		Gentry (8–7)		36,012	Shea Stadium	47–35	Boxscore	2	−4 1/2			
83	July 11	Expos	4–11		McAndrew (2–3)		36,012	Shea Stadium	47–36	Boxscore	2	−4 1/2		WOR-TV	
—	July 12	Expos	Postponed (rain); rescheduled for September 10					Shea Stadium				–5			
84	July 13	Expos	4–3	Koosman (7–5)			N/A	Shea Stadium	48–36	Boxscore	2	−5		WOR-TV	
85	July 13	Expos	9–7	Koonce (3–3)		Taylor (7)	40,653	Shea Stadium	49–36	Boxscore	2	−5		WOR-TV	
86	July 14	@ Cubs	0–1		Seaver (14–4)		37,473	Wrigley Field	49–37	Boxscore	2	−6			
87	July 15	@ Cubs	5–4	Gentry (9–7)		Taylor (8)	38,608	Wrigley Field	50–37	Boxscore	2	−5			
88	July 16	@ Cubs	9–5	Koonce (4–3)	Jenkins (12–7)	Taylor (9)	36,795	Wrigley Field	51–37	Boxscore	2	−4			
89	July 18	@ Expos	5–2	Koosman (8–5)			23,507	Jarry Park	52–37	Boxscore	2	−4		WOR-TV	
90	July 19	@ Expos	4–5		Seaver (14–5)		21,493	Jarry Park	52–38	Boxscore	2	−4			NBC
91	July 20	@ Expos	2–3		Gentry (9–8)		N/A	Jarry Park	52–39	Boxscore	2	−5		WOR-TV	
92	July 20	@ Expos	4–3 (10)	DiLauro (1–3)			27,356	Jarry Park	53–39	Boxscore	2	−5		WOR-TV	
July 23: All-Star Game (NL wins—)			9–3	Carlton (STL)	Stottlemyre (NYY)		45,259	RFK Stadium	Washington, D.C.						
93	July 24	Reds	3–4 (12)		McGraw (5–2)		30,934	Shea Stadium	53–40	Boxscore	2	−6		WOR-TV	
94	July 25	Reds	4–3	Taylor (5–2)			37,470	Shea Stadium	54–40	Boxscore	2	−5		WOR-TV	
95	July 26	Reds	3–2	Seaver (15–5)			25,259	Shea Stadium	55–40	Boxscore	2	−5			
96	July 27	Reds	3–6		Cardwell (3–9)		55,391	Shea Stadium	55–41	Boxscore	2	−5		WOR-TV	
—	July 29	Astros	Postponed (rain); rescheduled for July 31					Shea Stadium				–5 1/2			
97	July 30	Astros	3–16		Koosman (8–6)		N/A	Shea Stadium	55–42	Boxscore	2	−5 1/2			
98	July 30	Astros	5–11		Gentry (9–9)		28,922	Shea Stadium	55–43	Boxscore	2	−5 1/2			
99	July 31	Astros	0–2		Seaver (15–6)		6,683	Shea Stadium	55–44	Boxscore	2	−6 1/2		WOR-TV	

August: 21–10 (Home: 12–1; Road: 9–9)

#	Date	Opponent	Score	Win	Loss	Save	Attendance	Stadium	Record	Report	Rank	GB			
100	August 1	Braves	5–4	Koonce (5–3)	Niekro (14–9)	Taylor (10)	34,779	Shea Stadium	56–44	Boxscore	2	−6 1/2	8:00 p.m. EDT	WOR-TV	
101	August 2	Braves	1–0	McAndrew (3–3)	Reed (10–8)	McGraw (6)	37,442	Shea Stadium	57–44	Boxscore	2	−6 1/2	8:00 p.m. EDT	WOR-TV	
102	August 3	Braves	6–5 (11)	Taylor (6–2)	Raymond (2–2)	—	34,696	Shea Stadium	58–44	Boxscore	2	−6 1/2	2:15 p.m. EDT	WOR-TV	
103	August 4	@ Reds	0–1		Koosman (8–7)		13,228	Crosley Field	58–45	Boxscore	2	−7 1/2			
104	August 5	@ Reds	5–8		Seaver (15–7)		N/A	Crosley Field	58–46	Boxscore	2	−8		WOR-TV	
105	August 5	@ Reds	10–1	Ryan (4–1)			31,062	Crosley Field	59–46	Boxscore	2	−8		WOR-TV	
106	August 6	@ Reds	2–3		McAndrew (3–4)		17,452	Crosley Field	59–47	Boxscore	2	−9		WOR-TV	
107 (1)	August 8	@ Braves	4–1	Koosman (9–7)	Pappas (5–8)	—	N/A	Atlanta Stadium	60–47	Boxscore	2	−8 1/2	6:05 p.m. EDT	WOR-TV	
108 (2)	August 8	@ Braves	0–1 (10)	Reed (11–8)	Taylor (6–3)	—	42,838	Atlanta Stadium	60–48	Boxscore	2	−8 1/2		WOR-TV	
109	August 9	@ Braves	5–3	Seaver (16–7)	Stone (9–7)	Koonce (7)	28,194	Atlanta Stadium	61–48	Boxscore	2	−8 1/2	2:15 p.m. EDT		NBC
110	August 10	@ Braves	3–0	Cardwell (4–9)	Britton (5–3)	McGraw (7)	18,224	Atlanta Stadium	62–48	Boxscore	2	−7 1/2	2:15 p.m. EDT	WOR-TV	
111	August 11	@ Astros	0–3		McAndrew (3–5)		21,798	Astrodome	62–49	Boxscore	2	−8			
112	August 12	@ Astros	7–8		Koosman (9–8)		22,283	Astrodome	62–50	Boxscore	2	−9		WOR-TV	
113	August 13	@ Astros	2–8		Gentry (9–10)		30,590	Astrodome	62–51	Boxscore	3	−10	8:30 PM EDT	WOR-TV	
—	August 15	Padres	Postponed (rain); rescheduled for August 17					Shea Stadium				–9 1/2			
114	August 16	Padres	2–0	Seaver (17–7)		Taylor (11)	N/A	Shea Stadium	63–51	Boxscore	2	−9		WOR-TV	
115	August 16	Padres	2–1	McAndrew (4–5)		McGraw (8)	19,940	Shea Stadium	64–51	Boxscore	2	−9		WOR-TV	
116	August 17	Padres	3–2	Koosman (10–8)			N/A	Shea Stadium	65–51	Boxscore	2	−8		WOR-TV	
117	August 17	Padres	3–2	Cardwell (5–9)		Taylor (12)	35,711	Shea Stadium	66–51	Boxscore	2	−8		WOR-TV	
118	August 19	Giants	1–0 (14)	McGraw (6–2)			48,968	Shea Stadium	67–51	Boxscore	2	−8		WOR-TV	
119	August 20	Giants	6–0	McAndrew (5–5)			48,414	Shea Stadium	68–51	Boxscore	2	−7		WOR-TV	
120	August 21	Giants	6–7 (11)		Taylor (6–4)		42,795	Shea Stadium	68–52	Boxscore	2	−7		WOR-TV	
121	August 22	Dodgers	5–3	Koosman (11–8)		McGraw (9)	50,460	Shea Stadium	69–52	Boxscore	2	−6		WOR-TV	
122	August 23	Dodgers	3–2	Taylor (7–4)			40,974	Shea Stadium	70–52	Boxscore	2	−6		WOR-TV	
123	August 24	Dodgers	7–4	Koonce (6–3)			48,435	Shea Stadium	71–52	Boxscore	2	−5 1/2		WOR-TV	
124	August 26	@ Padres	8–4	Seaver (18–7)			N/A	San Diego Stadium	72–52	Boxscore	2	−3 1/2			
125	August 26	@ Padres	3–0	McAndrew (6–5)			8,873	San Diego Stadium	73–52	Boxscore	2	−3 1/2			
126	August 27	@ Padres	4–1	Koosman (12–8)			5,525	San Diego Stadium	74–52	Boxscore	2	−2 1/2			
127	August 29	@ Giants	0–5		Gentry (9–11)		13,843	Candlestick Park	74–53	Boxscore	2	−4			
128	August 30	@ Giants	3–2 (10)	McGraw (7–2)			14,436	Candlestick Park	75–53	Boxscore	2	−4			
129 (1)	August 31	@ Giants	8–0	Seaver (19–7)			N/A	Candlestick Park	76–53	Boxscore	2	−4 1/2			
130 (2)	August 31	@ Giants	2–3 (11)		McGraw (7–3)		32,327	Candlestick Park	76–54	Boxscore	2	−4 1/2			

September: 23–7 (Home: 13–4; Road: 10–3)

#	Date	Opponent	Score	Win	Loss	Save	Attendance	Stadium	Record	Report	Rank	GB			
131	September 1	@ Dodgers	6–10		Koosman (12–9)		28,079	Dodger Stadium	76–55	Boxscore	2	−5		WOR-TV	
132	September 2	@ Dodgers	5–4	Gentry (10–11)		McGraw (10)	25,676	Dodger Stadium	77–55	Boxscore	2	−5			
133	September 3	@ Dodgers	4–5		DiLauro (1–4)		26,625	Dodger Stadium	77–56	Boxscore	2	−5			
134	September 5	Phillies	5–1	Seaver (20–7)			N/A	Shea Stadium	78–56	Boxscore	2	−4 1/2			
135	September 5	Phillies	2–4		McAndrew (6–6)		40,450	Shea Stadium	78–57	Boxscore	2	−4 1/2		WOR-TV	
136	September 6	Phillies	3–0	Cardwell (6–9)		McGraw (11)	20,477	Shea Stadium	79–57	Boxscore	2	−3 1/2		WOR-TV	NBC
137	September 7	Phillies	9–3	Ryan (5–1)			28,937	Shea Stadium	80–57	Boxscore	2	−2 1/2		WOR-TV	
138	September 8	Cubs	3–2	Koosman (13–9)			43,274	Shea Stadium	81–57	Boxscore	2	−1 1/2		WOR-TV	
139	September 9	Cubs	7–1	Seaver (21–7)	Jenkins (19–13)		51,448	Shea Stadium	82–57	Boxscore	2	-½		WOR-TV	
140	September 10	Expos	3–2 (12)	Taylor (8–4)			N/A	Shea Stadium	83–57	Boxscore	1	+1		WOR-TV	
141	September 10	Expos	7–1	Ryan (6–1)			23,512	Shea Stadium	84–57	Boxscore	1	+1		WOR-TV	
142	September 11	Expos	4–0	Gentry (11–11)			10,713	Shea Stadium	85–57	Boxscore	1	+2			
143	September 12	@ Pirates	1–0	Koosman (14–9)			N/A	Forbes Field	86–57	Boxscore	1	+2 1/2	6:05 PM EDT		
144	September 12	@ Pirates	1–0	Cardwell (7–9)		McGraw (12)	19,303	Forbes Field	87–57	Boxscore	1	+2 1/2	8:49 PM EDT	WOR-TV	
145	September 13	@ Pirates	5–2	Seaver (22–7)			10,440	Forbes Field	88–57	Boxscore	1	+3 1/2	4:15 PM EDT	WOR-TV	NBC
146	September 14	@ Pirates	3–5		Ryan (6–2)		11,324	Forbes Field	88–58	Boxscore	1	+3 1/2	1:35 PM EDT	WOR-TV	
147	September 15	@ Cardinals	4–3	McGraw (8–3)			13,086	Busch Memorial Stadium	89–58	Boxscore	1	+4 1/2	9:00 PM EDT	WOR-TV	
—	September 16	@ Cardinals	Postponed (rain); rescheduled for September 22					Busch Memorial Stadium				+4			
148	September 17	@ Expos	5–0	Koosman (15–9)			10,422	Jarry Park	90–58	Boxscore	1	+4			
149	September 18	@ Expos	2–0	Seaver (23–7)			13,280	Jarry Park	91–58	Boxscore	1	+5			
150	September 19	Pirates	2–8		Ryan (6–3)		N/A	Shea Stadium	91–59	Boxscore	1	+4			
151	September 19	Pirates	0–8		McAndrew (6–7)		51,885	Shea Stadium	91–60	Boxscore	1	+4			
152	September 20	Pirates	0–4		Gentry (11–12)		38,784	Shea Stadium	91–61	Boxscore	1	+4		WOR-TV	
153	September 21	Pirates	5–3	Koosman (16–9)			N/A	Shea Stadium	92–61	Boxscore	1	+4 1/2		WOR-TV	
154	September 21	Pirates	6–1	Cardwell (8–9)			55,901	Shea Stadium	93–61	Boxscore	1	+4 1/2		WOR-TV	
155	September 22	Cardinals	3–1	Seaver (24–7)			23,267	Shea Stadium	94–61	Boxscore	1	+5			
156	September 23	Cardinals	3–2 (11)	McGraw (9–3)			32,364	Shea Stadium	95–61	Boxscore	1	+6		WOR-TV	
157	September 24	Cardinals	6–0	Gentry (12–12)	Carlton (17–11)		54,928	Shea Stadium	96–61	Boxscore	1	+6		WOR-TV	
158	September 26	@ Phillies	5–0	Koosman (17–9)			6,288	Connie Mack Stadium	97–61	Boxscore	1	+7		WOR-TV	
159	September 27	@ Phillies	1–0	Seaver (25–7)			4,297	Connie Mack Stadium	98–61	Boxscore	1	+8			
160	September 28	@ Phillies	2–0	Gentry (13–12)		Taylor (13)	6,875	Connie Mack Stadium	99–61	Boxscore	1	+8			

October: 1–1 (Road: 1–1)

#	Date	Opponent	Score	Win	Loss	Save	Attendance	Stadium	Record	Report	Rank	GB	
161	October 1	@ Cubs	6–5 (12)	Taylor (9–4)		Johnson (1)	10,136	Wrigley Field	100–61	Boxscore	1	+9	2:30 PM EDT
162	October 2	@ Cubs	3–5	Decker (1–0)	Cardwell (8–10)		9,981	Wrigley Field	100–62	Boxscore	1	+8	2:30 PM EDT

Legend
Mets win	Mets loss	All-Star Game	Game postponed	Clinched

"GB" legend
1st (NL East)	Not in playoff berth	Tied for 1st (NL East)

All times are Eastern Time

- All games broadcast on WJRZ and Mets Radio Network

=== Postseason ===
1969 Postseason Game Log
Overall: 7–1 (Home: 4–0; Away: 3–1)
NL Championship Series vs. Atlanta Braves: 3–0 (Home: 1–0; Away: 2–0)

#	Date	Time (ET)	Opponent	Score	Win	Loss	Save	Time of Game	Location (Attendance)	Series	Box/ Streak
1	October 4	4:00 p.m. EDT	@ Braves	9–5	Seaver (1–0)	Niekro (0–1)	—	2:37	Atlanta Stadium (50,122)	NYN 1–0	W1
2	October 5	4:00 p.m. EDT	@ Braves	11–6	Taylor (1–0)	Reed (0–1)	McGraw (1)	3:10	Atlanta Stadium (50,270)	NYN 2–0	W2
3	October 6	1:00 p.m. EDT	Braves	7–4	Ryan (1–0)	Jarvis (0–1)	—	2:24	Shea Stadium (54,195)	NYN 3–0	W3

World Series vs. Baltimore Orioles: 4–1 (Home: 3–0; Away: 1–1)

#	Date	Time (ET)	Opponent	Score	Win	Loss	Save	Time of Game	Location (Attendance)	Series	Box/ Streak
1	October 11	1:00 p.m. EDT	@ Orioles	1–4	Cuellar (1–0)	Seaver (0–1)	—	2:13	Memorial Stadium (50,429)	BAL 1–0	L1
2	October 12	2:00 p.m. EDT	@ Orioles	2–1	Koosman (1–0)	McNally (0–1)	Taylor (1)	2:20	Memorial Stadium (50,850)	TIE 1–1	W1
3	October 14	1:00 p.m. EDT	Orioles	5–0	Gentry (1–0)	Palmer (0–1)	Ryan (1)	2:23	Shea Stadium (56,335)	NYN 2–1	W2
4	October 15	1:00 p.m. EDT	Orioles	2–1 (10)	Seaver (1–1)	Hall (0–1)	—	2:33	Shea Stadium (57,367)	NYN 3–1	W3
5	October 16	1:00 p.m. EDT	Orioles	5–3	Koosman (2–0)	Watt (0–1)	—	2:14	Shea Stadium (57,397)	NYN 4–1	W4

=== Attendance ===
Attendance	Rank
2,175,373	1

== Roster ==
1969 New York Mets
Roster
Pitchers: 27 Don Cardwell; 31 Jack DiLauro; 29 Danny Frisella; 39 Gary Gentry; 38 Jesse Hudson; 38 Al Jackson; 29 Bob Johnson; 34 Cal Koonce; 36 Jerry Koosman; 43 Jim McAndrew; 45 Tug McGraw; 31,33 Les Rohr; 30 Nolan Ryan; 41 Tom Seaver; 42 Ron Taylor	Catchers: 10 Duffy Dyer; 15 Jerry Grote; 9 J. C. Martin; Infielders: 12 Ken Boswell; 5 Ed Charles; 22 Donn Clendenon; 1 Kevin Collins; 11 Wayne Garrett; 3 Bud Harrelson; 23,28 Bob Heise; 7 Ed Kranepool; 1 Bobby Pfeil; 6 Al Weis	Outfielders: 20 Tommie Agee; 17 Rod Gaspar; 18 Jim Gosger; 21 Cleon Jones; 25 Amos Otis; 24 Art Shamsky; 4 Ron Swoboda	Manager: 14 Gil Hodges; Coaches: 8 Yogi Berra (first base); 52 Joe Pignatano (bullpen); 54 Rube Walker (pitching); 53 Eddie Yost (third base)

== The final out ==
With two outs in the top of the ninth inning, starting pitcher Jerry Koosman faced Orioles second baseman Davey Johnson (who later managed the Mets to their second World Series championship in 1986). After taking a pitch of two balls and one strike, Johnson hit a fly-ball out to left field which was caught by Cleon Jones.

== Hall of Fame members who played in the 1969 World Series ==
Two future Hall of Fame members were on that Mets' roster: pitcher Tom Seaver, who won 25 games en route to winning the Cy Young Award, and a young Nolan Ryan playing in his third season. Seaver was inducted into the Hall of Fame in 1992 and Ryan in 1999. Manager Gil Hodges was elected to the Hall in 2022. Bench coach Yogi Berra and Director of Player Development Whitey Herzog are also in the Hall of Fame.

The Baltimore Orioles boasted four future Hall of Famers on their roster: pitcher Jim Palmer, outfielder Frank Robinson, third baseman Brooks Robinson, and manager Earl Weaver.

=== Opening Day starters ===
- Tommie Agee
- Ken Boswell
- Ed Charles
- Rod Gaspar
- Jerry Grote
- Bud Harrelson
- Cleon Jones
- Ed Kranepool
- Tom Seaver

=== Notable transactions ===
- June 13, 1969: Al Jackson was purchased from the Mets by the Cincinnati Reds.
- June 15, 1969: Kevin Collins, Steve Renko, Bill Carden (minors), and Dave Colon (minors) were traded by the Mets to the Montreal Expos for Donn Clendenon.

== Player stats ==
= Indicates team leader

=== Batting ===
==== Starters by position ====
Note: Pos = Position; G = Games played; AB = At bats; H = Hits; Avg. = Batting average; HR = Home runs; RBI = Runs batted in

Pos	Player	G	AB	H	Avg.	HR	RBI
C	Jerry Grote	113	365	92	.252	6	40
1B	Ed Kranepool	112	353	84	.238	11	49
2B	Ken Boswell	102	362	101	.279	3	32
3B	Wayne Garrett	124	400	87	.218	1	39
SS	Bud Harrelson	123	395	98	.248	0	24
LF	Cleon Jones	137	483	164	.340	12	75
CF	Tommie Agee	149	565	153	.271	26	76
RF	Ron Swoboda	109	327	77	.235	9	52

==== Other batters ====
Note: G = Games played; AB = At bats; H = Hits; Avg. = Batting average; HR = Home runs; RBI = Runs batted in

Player	G	AB	H	Avg.	HR	RBI
Art Shamsky	100	303	91	.300	14	47
Al Weis	103	247	53	.215	2	23
Rod Gaspar	118	215	49	.228	1	19
Bobby Pfeil	62	211	49	.232	0	10
Donn Clendenon	72	202	51	.252	12	37
J. C. Martin	66	177	37	.209	4	21
Ed Charles	61	169	35	.207	3	18
Amos Otis	48	93	14	.151	0	4
Duffy Dyer	29	74	19	.257	3	12
Kevin Collins	16	40	6	.150	1	2
Jim Gosger	10	15	2	.133	0	1
Bob Heise	4	10	3	.300	0	0

=== Pitching ===
==== Starting pitchers ====
Note: G = Games pitched; IP = Innings pitched; W = Wins; L = Losses; ERA = Earned run average; SO = Strikeouts

Player	G	IP	W	L	ERA	SO
Tom Seaver	36	273.1	25	7	2.21	208
Jerry Koosman	32	241.0	17	9	2.28	180
Gary Gentry	35	233.2	13	12	3.43	154
Don Cardwell	30	152.1	8	10	3.01	60
Jim McAndrew	27	135.0	6	7	3.47	90

==== Other pitchers ====
Note: G = Games pitched; IP = Innings pitched; W = Wins; L = Losses; ERA = Earned run average; SO = Strikeouts

Player	G	IP	W	L	ERA	SO
Nolan Ryan	25	89.1	6	3	3.53	92
Jack DiLauro	23	63.2	1	4	2.40	27

==== Relief pitchers ====
Note: G = Games pitched; W = Wins; L = Losses; SV = Saves; ERA = Earned run average; SO = Strikeouts

Player	G	W	L	SV	ERA	SO
Ron Taylor	59	9	4	13	2.72	42
Tug McGraw	42	9	3	12	2.24	92
Cal Koonce	40	6	3	7	4.99	48
Al Jackson	9	1	0	0	10.64	10
Danny Frisella	3	0	0	0	7.71	5
Jesse Hudson	1	0	0	0	4.50	3
Bob Johnson	2	0	0	1	0.00	1
Les Rohr	1	0	0	0	20.25	0

== NLCS ==
=== Game 1 ===
Saturday, October 4, 1969, at Atlanta Stadium in Atlanta

Team	1	2	3	4	5	6	7	8	9	R	H	E
New York	0	2	0	2	0	0	0	5	0	9	10	1
Atlanta	0	1	2	0	1	0	1	0	0	5	10	2
WP: Tom Seaver (1–0) LP: Phil Niekro (0–1); Home runs: NYM: None; ATL: Tony González (1), Hank Aaron (1)

=== Game 2 ===
Sunday, October 5, 1969, at Atlanta Stadium in Atlanta, Georgia

Team	1	2	3	4	5	6	7	8	9	R	H	E
New York	1	3	2	2	1	0	2	0	0	11	13	1
Atlanta	0	0	0	1	5	0	0	0	0	6	9	3
WP: Ron Taylor (1–0) LP: Ron Reed (0–1) Sv: Tug McGraw (1); Home runs: NYM: Tommie Agee (1), Ken Boswell (1), Cleon Jones (1); ATL: Hank Aaron (2)

=== Game 3 ===
Monday, October 6, 1969, at Shea Stadium in Queens, New York

Team	1	2	3	4	5	6	7	8	9	R	H	E
Atlanta	2	0	0	0	2	0	0	0	0	4	8	1
New York	0	0	1	2	3	1	0	0	X	7	14	0
WP: Nolan Ryan (1–0) LP: Pat Jarvis (0–1); Home runs: ATL: Hank Aaron (3), Orlando Cepeda (1); NYM: Tommie Agee (2), Ken Boswell (2), Wayne Garrett (1)

== World Series ==
=== Game 1 ===
Saturday, October 11, 1969, at Memorial Stadium in Baltimore, Maryland

Team	1	2	3	4	5	6	7	8	9	R	H	E
New York	0	0	0	0	0	0	1	0	0	1	6	1
Baltimore	1	0	0	3	0	0	0	0	X	4	6	0
WP: Mike Cuellar (1–0) LP: Tom Seaver (0–1); Home runs: NYM: None; BAL: Don Buford (1)

=== Game 2 ===
Sunday, October 12, 1969, at Memorial Stadium in Baltimore, Maryland

Team	1	2	3	4	5	6	7	8	9	R	H	E
New York	0	0	0	1	0	0	0	0	1	2	6	0
Baltimore	0	0	0	0	0	0	1	0	0	1	2	0
WP: Jerry Koosman (1–0) LP: Dave McNally (0–1) Sv: Ron Taylor (1); Home runs: NYM: Donn Clendenon (1); BAL: None

=== Game 3 ===
Tuesday, October 14, 1969, at Shea Stadium in Flushing, Queens, New York

Team	1	2	3	4	5	6	7	8	9	R	H	E
Baltimore	0	0	0	0	0	0	0	0	0	0	4	1
New York	1	2	0	0	0	1	0	1	X	5	6	0
WP: Gary Gentry (1–0) LP: Jim Palmer (0–1) Sv: Nolan Ryan (1); Home runs: BAL: None; NYM: Tommie Agee (1), Ed Kranepool (1)

=== Game 4 ===
Wednesday, October 15, 1969, at Shea Stadium in Flushing, Queens, New York

Team	1	2	3	4	5	6	7	8	9	10	R	H	E
Baltimore	0	0	0	0	0	0	0	0	1	0	1	6	1
New York	0	1	0	0	0	0	0	0	0	1	2	10	1
WP: Tom Seaver (1–1) LP: Dick Hall (0–1); Home runs: BAL: None; NYM: Donn Clendenon (2)

=== Game 5 ===
Thursday, October 16, 1969, at Shea Stadium in Flushing, Queens, New York

Team	1	2	3	4	5	6	7	8	9	R	H	E
Baltimore	0	0	3	0	0	0	0	0	0	3	5	2
New York	0	0	0	0	0	2	1	2	X	5	7	0
WP: Jerry Koosman (2–0) LP: Eddie Watt (0–1); Home runs: BAL: Dave McNally (1), Frank Robinson (1); NYM: Donn Clendenon (3), Al Weis (1)

== In popular culture ==
In the movie Oh, God!, God, as played by George Burns, explains to John Denver that "the last miracle I performed was the 1969 Mets."

Part of the movie Frequency is set in Queens, New York, in 1969, as firefighter and avid Mets fan Frank Sullivan (Dennis Quaid) and his family follow the "Amazin's" throughout the World Series.

In Moonlighting, Season 2, Episode 13, "In God We Strongly Suspect", when David is attempting to define the parameters of Maddie's skepticism and atheism by inviting her to provide logical explanations for various phenomena seemingly beyond man's understanding, he mentions the "'69 Mets" which she immediately dismisses as "a myth and a hoax".

In his song "Faith and Fear in Flushing Meadows", twee/folk artist Harry Breitner makes mention of Tom Seaver and Jerry Koosman.

In the TV sitcom Everybody Loves Raymond episode "Big Shots", Ray and Robert visit the Baseball Hall of Fame to meet members of the '69 Mets.

In the film Men in Black 3, set shortly before the Apollo 11 launch in July 1969, Griffin, an alien from the fifth dimension who can see the future, says the Mets' title is his favorite human history moment for "all the improbabilities that helped".

In the TV show Growing Pains, the family's name was the Seavers and their neighbors were the Koosmans.

In the TV Sitcom The Simpsons episode MoneyBart, Homer Simpson says the 1969 Mets will live on forever.

== Awards and honors ==
=== Awards ===
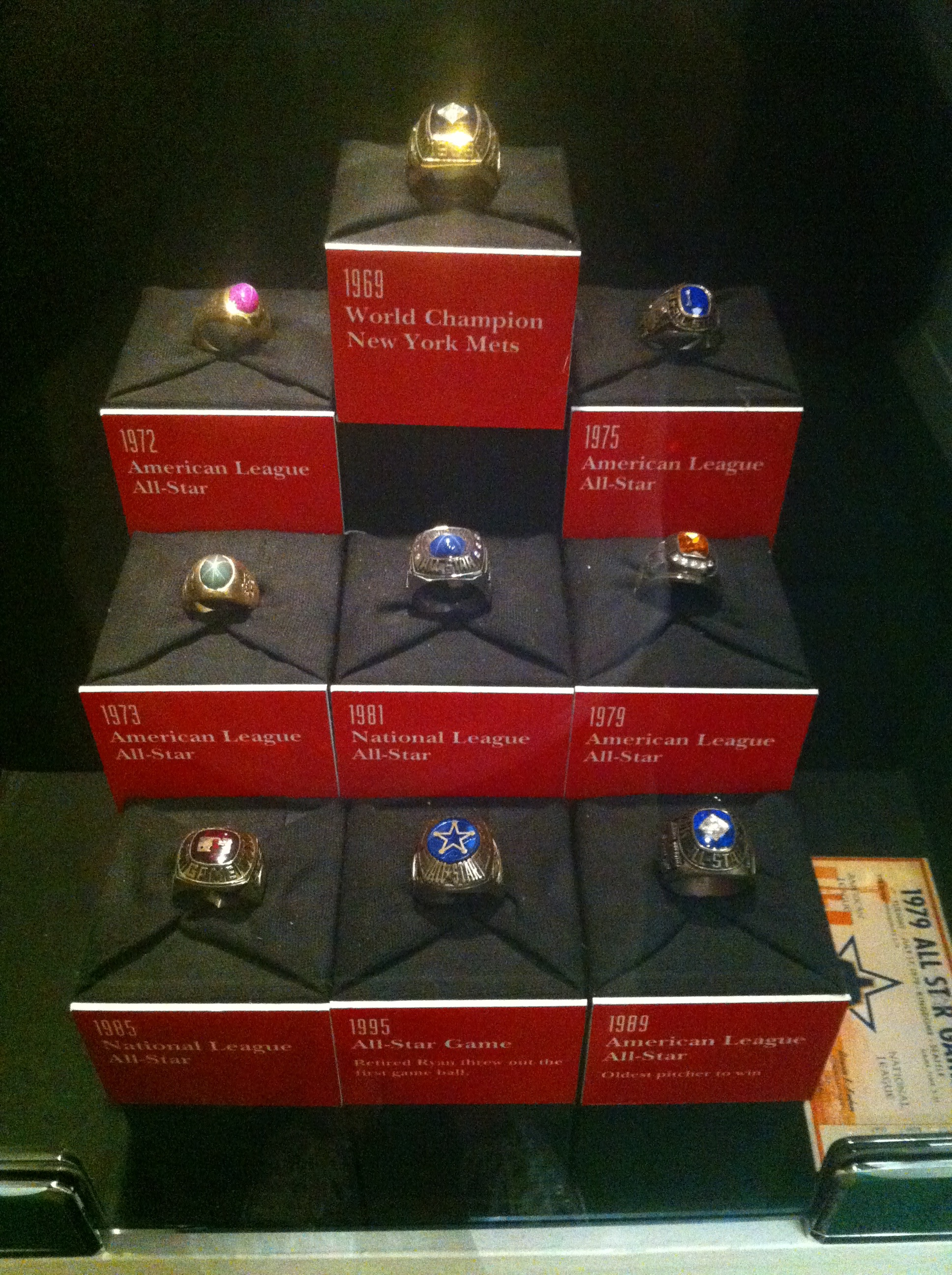
Nolan Ryan's 1969 championship ring on display at the Nolan Ryan Exhibit Center

Regular Season
Player	Award
Al Weis	Babe Ruth Award
Tom Seaver	National League Cy Young Award
Tom Seaver	Associated Press Athlete of the Year
Tom Seaver	Sports Illustrated Sportsman of the Year

Playoffs
Player	Award
Donn Clendenon	World Series Most Valuable Player Award

Regular Season
Manager	Award
Gil Hodges	Associated Press NL Manager of the Year

== 40th Major League Baseball All-Star Game ==
Outfielders

Pos	#	Player	League	AB	H	RBI
LF	21	Cleon Jones	National League; Starter	4	2	0

Pitchers

#	Player	League	IP	SO
36	Jerry Koosman	National League	1.2	1
41	Tom Seaver	National League	did not pitch	

== Draft ==
Date	Round	Pick	Player	Position	Hometown/School
June 5, 1969	1	4	Randy Sterling	RHP	Key West, Florida
June 5, 1969	2	28	Joe Nolan	C	St. Louis, Missouri

== Farm system ==
Level	Team	League	Manager
AAA	Tidewater Tides	International League	Clyde McCullough
AA	Memphis Blues	Texas League	Pete Pavlick, John Antonelli and Roy McMillan
A	Visalia Mets	California League	Roy McMillan, Chuck Estrada and Harry Minor
A	Pompano Beach Mets	Florida State League	Joe Frazier
Rookie	Marion Mets	Appalachian League	Jack Cassini

LEAGUE CHAMPIONS: Memphis
