= Jerry Grote =

American baseball player (1942–2024)

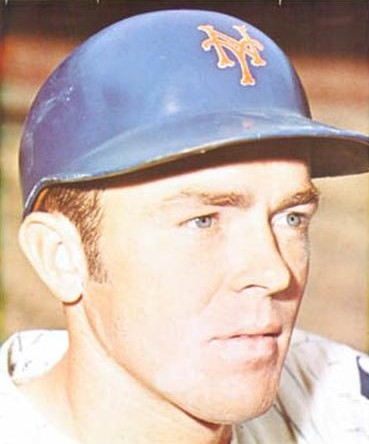
- Grote with the New York Mets in 1972
- Catcher
- Born: October 6, 1942; San Antonio, Texas, U.S.
- Died: April 7, 2024 (aged 81); Austin, Texas, U.S.
- Batted: Right Threw: Right

MLB debut
- September 21, 1963, for the Houston Colt .45s

Last MLB appearance
- October 3, 1981, for the Los Angeles Dodgers

MLB statistics
- Batting average: .252
- Home runs: 39
- Runs batted in: 404
- Stats at Baseball Reference

Teams
- Houston Colt .45s (1963–1964); New York Mets (1966–1977); Los Angeles Dodgers (1977–1978); Kansas City Royals (1981); Los Angeles Dodgers (1981)

Career highlights and awards
- 2× All-Star (1968, 1974); World Series champion (1969); New York Mets Hall of Fame

Gerald Wayne Grote (October 6, 1942 – April 7, 2024) was an American professional baseball catcher. He played in Major League Baseball from 1963 through 1981 for the Houston Colt .45s, New York Mets, Los Angeles Dodgers, and Kansas City Royals.

After playing for Houston from 1963 to 1964, Grote played for the Mets from 1966 to 1977. With the Mets, he was a two-time All-Star player and was a member of the team that became known as the Miracle Mets for their upset victory over the Baltimore Orioles in the 1969 World Series. He finished his career with the Dodgers in 1977 and 1978 and the Royals and Dodgers in 1981. Grote was considered to be one of the best defensive catchers of his era. He was inducted into the New York Mets Hall of Fame in 1992.

== Early life ==
Grote was born on October 6, 1942, and was raised in San Antonio, Texas. When he was ten years old, he and his family were caught in an F-4 tornado. His mother, father, and two sisters made it to safety, however, his grandmother died in the storm.

Grote attended Douglas MacArthur High School, where he played on the baseball team as a pitcher, catcher, and third baseman. As a high school pitcher, he threw a no-hitter and a one hitter. Grote attended Trinity University in 1962, and played college baseball for the Trinity Tigers. He led the Tigers in batting average (.413), home runs (five), runs batted in (RBIs; 19), runs scored (29), and hits (31).

== Professional career ==
=== Houston Colt .45s ===
After one season at Trinity University, Grote was signed as an amateur free agent by the Houston Colt .45s in 1962, and was assigned to play for their minor league affiliate, the San Antonio Bullets. At the age of 20, he made his major league debut with the Colt .45s on September 21, 1963 as a late-inning defensive replacement for John Bateman, and hit a sacrifice fly to score Bob Aspromonte in his only plate appearance. For the season he appeared in three games, including on September 27, when every starter in the Colts' line-up was a rookie.

In 1964, Grote platooned with Bateman at catcher; however, the Colts also experimented with young catchers Dave Adlesh and John Hoffman, as neither Grote nor Bateman hit for a very high average that season (.181 and .190, respectively). Grote was the Colts' catcher on April 23, when Ken Johnson became the first pitcher in major league history to lose a complete game no-hitter in nine innings.

In 1965, the newly renamed Houston Astros remained unsettled behind the plate, with former All-Star Gus Triandos and prospect Ron Brand being added to the roster. Grote spent the entire season with Houston's Triple-A Pacific Coast League affiliate, the Oklahoma City 89ers, where he batted .265 with eleven home runs. At the end of the season, he was traded to the New York Mets for pitcher Tom Parsons.

=== New York Mets ===
Grote became the Mets' starting catcher in 1966. Though he batted only .237 with three home runs in his first season with the Mets, his handling of the Mets' young pitchers and his solid defensive skills were instrumental in helping the Mets avoid 100 losses and a last place finish for the first time in franchise history. Grote earned a reputation with his teammates and opponents as highly competitive, developing the trademark of rolling the ball to the far side of the pitcher's mound (closest to the Mets' dugout) while leaving the field after his pitcher ended an inning with a strikeout. This necessitated the opposing team's pitcher having to walk further to stoop and retrieve the ball. However every now and then some of his fellow pitcher teammates would negate this by reaching down and backhanding the ball back towards the mound with their glove.

In 1968, Grote was hitting over .300 at mid-season and was recognized as one of the top catchers in the Nationàl league when he was selected to be the starting catcher in the 1968 All-Star Game. He became only the second Met player in franchise history after Ron Hunt to earn a starting role in an All-Star game. Grote was hitless in two at-bats during the game. He ended the year with a .282 batting average along with three home runs and 31 RBIs.

In the 1969 season, the Chicago Cubs had been in first place since the beginning of the season and had a nine-game lead as late as August 15. However, the Cubs began to falter while the Mets continued to play well. When the two teams met for a two-game series on September 8, the Mets won both games to move just a half game behind the Cubs. Aside from calling Tom Seaver's five-hit pitching performance in the second game, Grote drove in the Mets' seventh and final run of the game. The following day, the Mets swept the Montreal Expos in a doubleheader, with Grote catching all 21 innings. Coupled with a Cubs loss, the Mets moved into first place for the first time in their history. The Mets stayed in the lead for the rest of the season, finishing with a 37–11 record in their final 48 games while the Cubs slumped to a 9–17 record in their final 26 games, and clinched the National League East division title on September 24.

Grote finished the 1969 season with a .252 average and career-highs with six home runs and 40 RBIs, but it was his defensive skills that proved most valuable for the Mets. Grote posted a .991 fielding percentage and his 56.3% caught stealing percentage was second-best among National League catchers. He was also credited with guiding a Mets young pitching staff that led the league in victories and shutouts and finished second in team earned run average.

The Mets swept the Atlanta Braves in the 1969 National League Championship Series, but were considered heavy underdogs heading into the 1969 World Series against the Baltimore Orioles. Following a 4–1 loss in the series opener with Cy Young Award winner Seaver on the mound, the Mets bounced back, winning the next four games to capture their first world championship. Besides catching every inning in the postseason, Grote contributed offensively with a single in Game Two to keep a ninth inning rally alive; Al Weis followed with the game-winning hit. With Game Four tied, Grote doubled to start the tenth inning, then pinch runner Rod Gaspar scored the winning run when an errant throw hit J.C. Martin on the wrist. With Grote calling the pitches, the Mets pitching staff held the Orioles hitters to a .146 batting average against during the series.

Grote led National League catchers in putouts and in range factor in 1970 and 1971. In 1972, Grote played in only 64 games due to injuries and in late September he had surgery to remove bone chips from his right elbow.

In May 1973, Grote broke a bone in his right arm when he was hit by a pitch and went on the disabled list for two months. When he returned in mid-July, the Mets began winning, climbing from last place on August 30 to win the National League Eastern Division. They then proceeded to defeat the heavily favored Cincinnati Reds in the 1973 National League Championship Series. In the World Series, the Mets took the Oakland Athletics to the seventh and final game, before they were defeated. As he had in 1969, Grote caught every inning of every post-season game for the Mets in 1973. Looking back on his two pennant-winning seasons with the Mets, Grote said, "It (the 1969 season) was no miracle. Now, '73 was a miracle."

In 1974, Grote was batting .287 with four home runs and 27 RBIs when he earned his second All-Star selection. Injuries began to take their toll and he split catching duties with Duffy Dyer. Grote rebounded in 1975, posting a career-high .295 batting average in 119 games and led all National League catchers with a .995 fielding percentage. At Veterans Stadium on July 4, 1975, Grote stepped in as a pinch hitter against longtime teammate Tug McGraw, who had been traded to the Philadelphia Phillies during the off-season. With the Mets down 3–2, Grote connected for a game-winning two-run home run.

=== Los Angeles Dodgers and Kansas City Royals ===
In August 1977, the Mets traded Grote to the Los Angeles Dodgers for two players to be named later. Shortly after joining the Dodgers, Grote struck out in his only career at-bat against former battery-mate Tom Seaver, who was now with the Reds. During his two seasons with the Dodgers, he played part-time as a backup to Steve Yeager and appeared in two World Series against the New York Yankees. He retired from professional baseball after the 1978 season.

In 1981, the Kansas City Royals, who were experiencing a shortage of catchers, lured Grote out of retirement. On June 3, at the age of 38, Grote went 3-for-4 with a grand slam, a double, and a stolen base, driving in a team-record seven runs. He recorded 17 hits in 56 at bats (.304) in 22 games for the Royals before they placed him on release waivers on September 1. He signed with the Dodgers and appeared in one game for them before the end of the season. Grote retired again after the 1981 season.

== Career statistics ==
In a 16-year major league career, Grote played in 1,421 games, accumulating 1,092 hits in 4,339 at bats for a .252 career batting average along with 39 home runs and 404 RBIs. He ended his career with a .991 fielding percentage, which at the time of his retirement was eighth highest all-time among catchers. On April 22, 1970, Grote set a major league record with 20 putouts in a game when Tom Seaver threw 19 strikeouts against the San Diego Padres. He is the Mets all-time leader in games played as a catcher (1,176). Grote caught 116 shutouts in his career, ranking him 15th all-time among catchers.

Grote called the pitches for some of the most outstanding pitchers of his era, including Tom Seaver, Jerry Koosman, Tug McGraw, Nolan Ryan, Tommy John, Don Sutton, and Dan Quisenberry. He possessed a strong and accurate throwing arm against opposing baserunners. Hall of Fame inductee Lou Brock found Grote to be one of the most difficult catchers on which to attempt a stolen base, and though Hall of Fame catcher Johnny Bench was the perennial Gold Glove winner during their careers in the National League together, Bench once said of Grote, "If Grote and I were on the same team, I would be playing third base."

== Post retirement and honors ==
After his playing career had ended, Grote went into business selling meat, but the business closed. In September 1983, he was indicted by a grand jury for hindering a secured creditor when he sold cattle that did not officially belong to him. The charges were dropped in May 1984.

Grote spent 1985 as manager of the Lakeland Tigers and the Birmingham Barons. In 1989, he played for the St. Lucie Legends in the Senior Professional Baseball Association. He was inducted into the Texas Baseball Hall of Fame in 1991, and the New York Mets Hall of Fame in 1992. In 1998, he was inducted into the San Antonio Sports Hall of Fame. On October 8, 2011, Grote was inducted into the Trinity University Athletic Hall of Fame.

Grote appeared as a Mystery Guest on the television game show What's My Line?. Grote and some of his teammates with the 1969 Mets appeared on an episode of Everybody Loves Raymond in 1999.

In 2010 and 2011, Grote was color commentator with Mike Capps on the Round Rock Express radio home broadcasts.

== Personal life ==
Grote and his first wife, Sharon, divorced in 1980. He married his second wife, Toni, in May 1982 and they divorced in July 1983. He had three children with his first wife – Sandy, Jeff, and Jennifer.

On April 7, 2024, Grote died from respiratory failure at the Texas Cardiac Arrhythmia Institute in Austin, Texas. He was 81.
