= Jim McAndrew =

American baseball player (1944–2024)

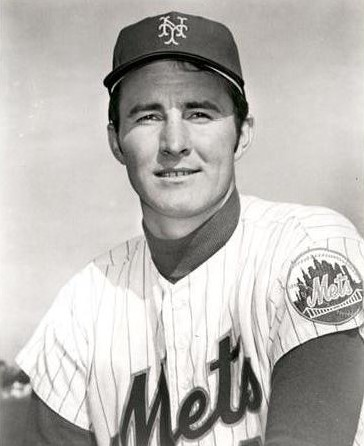
- McAndrew in 1971
- Pitcher
- Born: January 11, 1944; Lost Nation, Iowa, U.S.
- Died: March 14, 2024 (aged 80); Scottsdale, Arizona, U.S.
- Batted: Right Threw: Right

MLB debut
- July 21, 1968, for the New York Mets

Last MLB appearance
- May 29, 1974, for the San Diego Padres

MLB statistics
- Win–loss record: 37–53
- Earned run average: 3.65
- Strikeouts: 424
- Stats at Baseball Reference

Teams
- New York Mets (1968–1973); San Diego Padres (1974)

Career highlights and awards
- World Series champion (1969)

James Clement McAndrew (January 11, 1944 – March 14, 2024) was an American professional baseball pitcher. He pitched in Major League Baseball for the New York Mets and San Diego Padres from 1968 to 1974. He was a member of the 1969 World Series champions.

== Early life ==
James Clement McAndrew was born on January 11, 1944, in Lost Nation, Iowa. He was the oldest of four, with three younger sisters. He grew up on a 750-acre (300 ha) farm where his father raised chickens and grew corn.

McAndrew graduated from Lost Nation High School and attended the University of Iowa, where he played baseball and basketball for the Iowa Hawkeyes. He gave up playing basketball during his sophomore year after suffering a knee injury. He earned a bachelor's degree in psychology from Iowa.

== Career ==
The New York Mets selected McAndrew in the 11th round, with the 209th overall selection, of the 1965 MLB draft. He made his MLB debut on July 21, 1968, substituting for Nolan Ryan. He started twelve games for the Mets in 1968; the Mets had a 4–8 win-loss record in those games, and his record was 4–7. He had a 2.28 earned run average (ERA) in 1968.

McAndrew was a member of the 1969 World Series champions and the 1973 National League pennant winners. On September 10, 1969, he started and pitched 11 innings against the Montreal Expos in the first game of a double-header that the Mets swept to reach first place for the first time in franchise history. He did not pitch in the 1969 World Series as he was behind Tom Seaver, Jerry Koosman, and Gary Gentry on the Mets' depth chart. He also did not pitch in the 1973 World Series as the Mets relied on Seaver, Koosman, Jon Matlack, and relief pitcher Tug McGraw. McAndrew appeared in 23 games during the 1973 season, but due to injuries, he was limited to 80 1/3 innings pitched.

After the 1973 season, the Mets traded McAndrew to the San Diego Padres for Steve Simpson. He pitched in 15 games for the Padres before he was released.

McAndrew pitched in 161 games in his career, starting 110 of them. He registered 20 complete games and six shutouts. He retired with a 37–53 win-loss record and a 3.65 ERA.

== Personal life ==
McAndrew and his wife, Lyn, had four children. His son, Jamie McAndrew, also pitched in the major leagues.

After retiring from baseball in 1974, McAndrew went to work at General Dynamics in Chicago. He then worked in the coal industry. He and Lyn retired to Fountain Hills, Arizona.

McAndrew died following a brief illness at HonorHealth Scottsdale Shea Medical Center, on March 14, 2024.
