= Ron Taylor (baseball) =

Canadian baseball player (1937–2025)

Ron Taylor OOnt
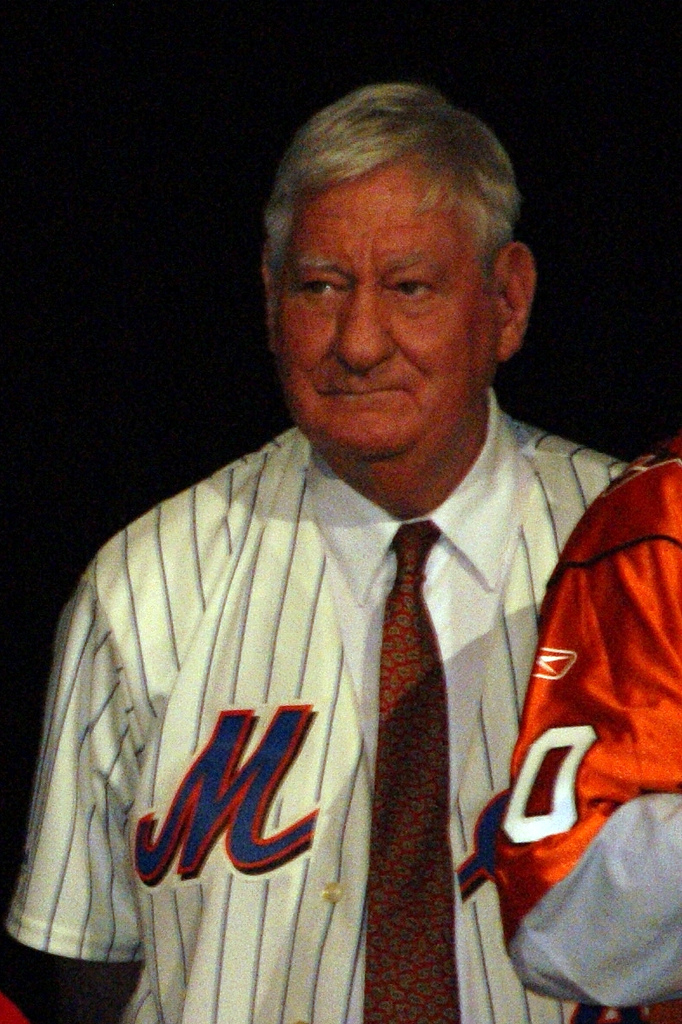
- Taylor in 2010
- Pitcher
- Born: December 13, 1937; Toronto, Ontario, Canada
- Died: June 16, 2025 (aged 87); Toronto, Ontario, Canada
- Batted: Right Threw: Right

MLB debut
- April 11, 1962, for the Cleveland Indians

Last MLB appearance
- May 14, 1972, for the San Diego Padres

MLB statistics
- Win–loss record: 45–43
- Earned run average: 3.93
- Strikeouts: 464
- Saves: 74
- Stats at Baseball Reference

Teams
- Cleveland Indians (1962); St. Louis Cardinals (1963–1965); Houston Astros (1965–1966); New York Mets (1967–1971); San Diego Padres (1972)

Career highlights and awards
- 2× World Series champion (1964, 1969)

Member of the Canadian

Baseball Hall of Fame
- Induction: 1985

Ronald Wesley Taylor OOnt (December 13, 1937 – June 16, 2025) was a Canadian professional baseball player, who went on to become a physician. Born in Toronto, Taylor was a pitcher over all or parts of 11 seasons (1962–1972) in Major League Baseball (MLB) with the Cleveland Indians, St. Louis Cardinals, Houston Astros, New York Mets and San Diego Padres. He was a key contributor to two World Series–winning teams: the 1964 Cardinals and the 1969 Mets.

After retiring as a baseball player, he attended medical school at the University of Toronto, graduating in 1977. In 1979, he started a 30-year association with the Toronto Blue Jays as the team's physician. As a result of his pitching success, Taylor was inducted into the Canadian Baseball Hall of Fame, Canada's Sports Hall of Fame, and the Ontario Sports Hall of Fame. He also served in the Royal Canadian Air Force. Taylor was appointed a member of the Order of Ontario in 2005.

== Early life ==
Ronald Wesley Taylor was born on December 13, 1937, in Toronto, Ontario, to Wesley and Maude Taylor. At a young age, he played as a natural left-hander; however, his mother worried the overuse of his left arm potentially led to cardiovascular ailments, and suggested to use the opposite arm instead. He played organized baseball with the Leaside Baseball Association, at Howard Talbot Park, located in Toronto's Leaside neighbourhood.

When Taylor was signed by the Cleveland Indians at age 18, part of his agreement with them was that he was allowed to continue his higher education. While playing professional minor league baseball during the summer in the late 1950s and early 1960s, he attended the University of Toronto (U of T), where he earned a degree in electrical engineering in 1961.

== Baseball career ==
=== Cleveland Indians ===
Taylor entered pro baseball in the Cleveland organization in 1956, attending university during off-seasons. After steady progress up the ladder in the Indians' farm system through 1961, he made Cleveland's Opening Day roster in 1962. On April 11, the Indians' second game of the regular season, Taylor drew the starting assignment against the Boston Red Sox at Fenway Park. He proceeded to throw 11 shutout innings and collect two hits in four at bats at the plate—one half of the Indians' hit total against Boston starter Bill Monbouquette. But in the 12th inning of the scoreless tie, Taylor loaded the bases with no out, then surrendered a game-deciding, walk-off grand slam home run to Carroll Hardy and was charged with the 4–0 defeat. Appearing in eight games pitched for the Indians, he returned to the minor leagues after May 20 and spent the rest of the year in Triple-A.

=== St. Louis Cardinals ===
On December 15, 1962, Cleveland traded Taylor and infielder Jack Kubiszyn to the Cardinals in exchange for first baseman Fred Whitfield. Taylor spent the remainder of his pitching career in the National League. With the 1963 Cardinals, he posted nine wins, 11 saves, and an earned run average of 2.84 over 54 appearances. The following year, his eight wins and eight saves contributed to the Cardinals' successful, late-season to the 1964 National League pennant. In the World Series that followed, Taylor pitched in two games and threw 42/3 hitless innings against the New York Yankees; notably, he went four innings in Game 4 at Yankee Stadium to earn a save, preserving the 4–3 win for Roger Craig. When the Redbirds prevailed in seven games, Taylor earned his first World Series ring.

Taylor suffered through two off-years in 1965 and 1966. In 1965, Taylor appeared in 25 games for St. Louis through June 15, then was traded with pitcher Mike Cuellar to the Astros for left-handed relief specialist Hal Woodeshick and minor league pitcher Chuck Taylor. He pitched poorly in Houston for the next season and a half, winning only three of 11 decisions (with four saves), and logged a poor 6.03 earned run average in 68 total games pitched.

=== New York Mets ===
On February 10, 1967, former Cardinals general manager Bing Devine, now president of the Mets, purchased his contract and revitalized his career. Although the five-year-old Mets remained a second-division team in both 1967 and 1968, Taylor enjoyed two sparkling campaigns coming out of the New York bullpen, with 22 saves in 108 total relief appearances and a composite ERA of 2.72. Then, in 1969, Taylor was a key member of the "Miracle Mets," who stunned baseball by rising from their ninth-place 1968 finish all the way to the world championship.

Taylor formed half of a formidable bullpen duo with left-hander Tug McGraw, leading the club in games pitched (59) and saves (13), winning nine of 13 decisions, and posting an effective 2.72 earned run average during the regular season. He then pitched 31/3 innings of scoreless relief in the 1969 National League Championship Series against the Atlanta Braves, allowing just three hits in his two appearances, and gaining credit for a victory in Game 2.

Then, in the 1969 World Series against the favoured Baltimore Orioles, Taylor pitched in two games, surrendered no hits in 21/3 innings pitched, and saved Jerry Koosman's Game 2 victory that kick-started the Mets' five-game Series triumph. Thus, in his four career World Series games, Taylor allowed no hits and only two bases on balls in seven full innings, with five strikeouts, and faced the minimum of 21 hitters.

=== Final years as MLB pitcher ===
Taylor remained a Met in 1970 and 1971 and posted seven more wins and 15 saves in 102 total games, although his ERA rose to 3.79. Then his contract was sold to the Montreal Expos, who released him on April 20, 1972, without bringing him into a game. Taylor signed with the Padres, but was ineffective in three of his four appearances in a San Diego uniform; on May 14 against Montreal at Jarry Park Stadium, he gave up home runs to Ken Singleton and Ron Fairly in his final major league pitching appearance.

Over his regular-season career, Taylor compiled a 45–43 won–lost record, 74 saves, and three complete games in 491 appearances, 474 of them as a relief pitcher. In 800 innings pitched, he allowed 794 hits and 209 walks, striking out 464. His career ERA was 3.93. He posted a .103 batting average (12-for-116) in his major league career. He was good defensively; Taylor made only three errors in 169 total chances for a .982 fielding percentage, which was 27 points higher than the league average at his position. In his post-season career, including the 1969 NLCS, he was 1–0 with three saves and a 0.00 ERA in six games pitched, permitting only three hits in 101/3 innings pitched.

== Medical career ==
Following his professional baseball career’s conclusion in 1972, Taylor enrolled in medical school at the University of Toronto in 1973. This decision was inspired by his experiences visiting field hospitals during a USO goodwill tour during the Vietnam War. Taylor graduated for a second time from the University of Toronto, earning a medical degree in 1977. Two years later, he returned to baseball as the team physician of the Toronto Blue Jays, a position he held for over three decades. During his tenure with the Blue Jays, he earned two additional World Series championships with the 1992 and 1993 World Series teams. Additionally, he established a private practice in Toronto, retiring from medicine in 2014. Throughout his career as the Blue Jays' physician, he earned the moniker “Doctor Baseball.”

== Personal life and death ==
Taylor has an older sister, Carole Mitchell. He was married twice. His second wife was named Rona.

Taylor died after a long illness on June 16, 2025, at the age of 87.

== Honors ==
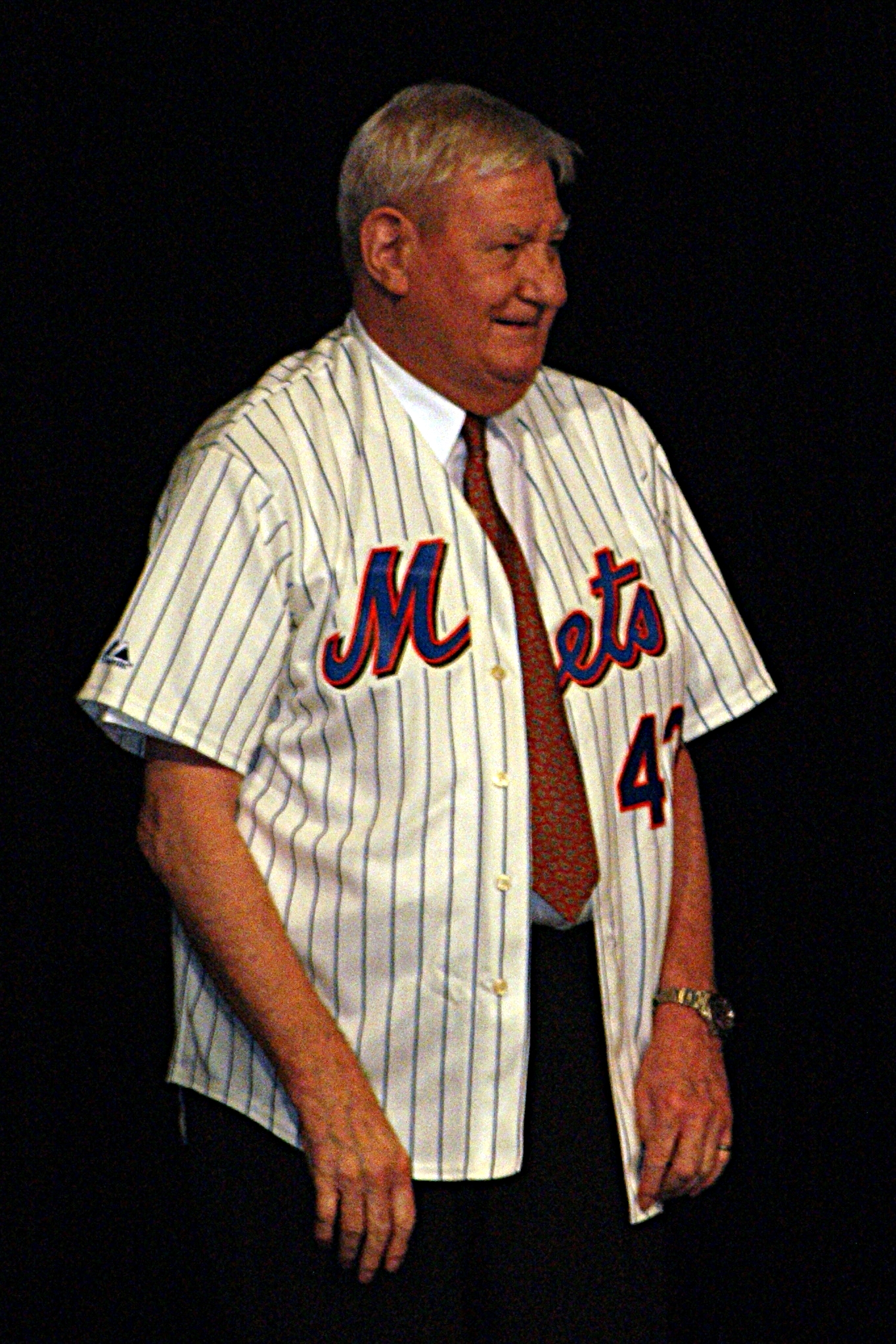
Taylor being inducted Canada's Sports Hall of Fame

Ron Taylor was inducted into the Canadian Baseball Hall of Fame in 1985, Canada's Sports Hall of Fame in 1993, and the Ontario Sports Hall of Fame in 2010. He was appointed a member of the Order of Ontario by the province's lieutenant governor in 2005.
