= Rod Gaspar =

American baseball player (born 1946)

- Outfielder
- Born: April 3, 1946 (age 80); Long Beach, California, U.S.
- Batted: Switch Threw: Left

MLB debut
- April 8, 1969, for the New York Mets

Last MLB appearance
- July 19, 1974, for the San Diego Padres

MLB statistics
- Batting average: .208
- Home runs: 1
- Runs batted in: 17
- Stats at Baseball Reference

Teams
- New York Mets (1969–1970); San Diego Padres (1971, 1974)

Career highlights and awards
- World Series champion: 1969

Rodney Earl Gaspar (born April 3, 1946) is an American former Major League Baseball outfielder.

A switch hitter, Gaspar played for the New York Mets (1969–70) and San Diego Padres (1971, 1974).

A former player at Long Beach State and Long Beach City College, Gaspar played 178 games in his career, 118 of them in his rookie year, 1969. He began the year as the Mets' starting right fielder, then became a utility outfielder (he also played left and center field on occasion) after Ron Swoboda became the regular right fielder. That year, he hit .228, recorded in 14 of his 17 career runs batted in, and hit his only major league home run, off Mike McCormick of the San Francisco Giants on May 30. He also excelled defensively, leading all Mets outfielders in assists with 12, and leading the National League in double plays with six.

That year, Gaspar was a member of the Miracle Mets team that unexpectedly won the World Series in five games over the Baltimore Orioles. Before the Series, Orioles' outfielder, Frank Robinson said, "Bring on the Mets and Ron Gaspar!" He was then told by his teammate, Merv Rettenmund, "It's Rod, stupid." He then retorted by saying, "OK. Bring on Rod Stupid!" In Game Four of that Series, Gaspar scored the winning run on a controversial play at Shea Stadium. With the score tied at 1–1 in the bottom of the tenth inning, Gaspar pinch-ran for Jerry Grote, who had led off the inning with a double. An intentional walk to Al Weis followed, after which J. C. Martin, pinch-hitting for Tom Seaver, bunted to the pitcher. Both runners advanced, and as Martin ran to first, Pete Richert's throw hit him on the hand and ricocheted away, the error allowing Gaspar to score the winning run. (Replays showed that Martin had been running inside the baseline, which could have resulted in him being called out for interference; however, the umpires said they didn't make the call because they felt Martin didn't intentionally interfere with the play.)

Rod appeared on The Dating Game TV show in 1969 with fellow Mets players, and was chosen out of the three bachelors.
