= Tommie Agee =

American baseball player (1942–2001)

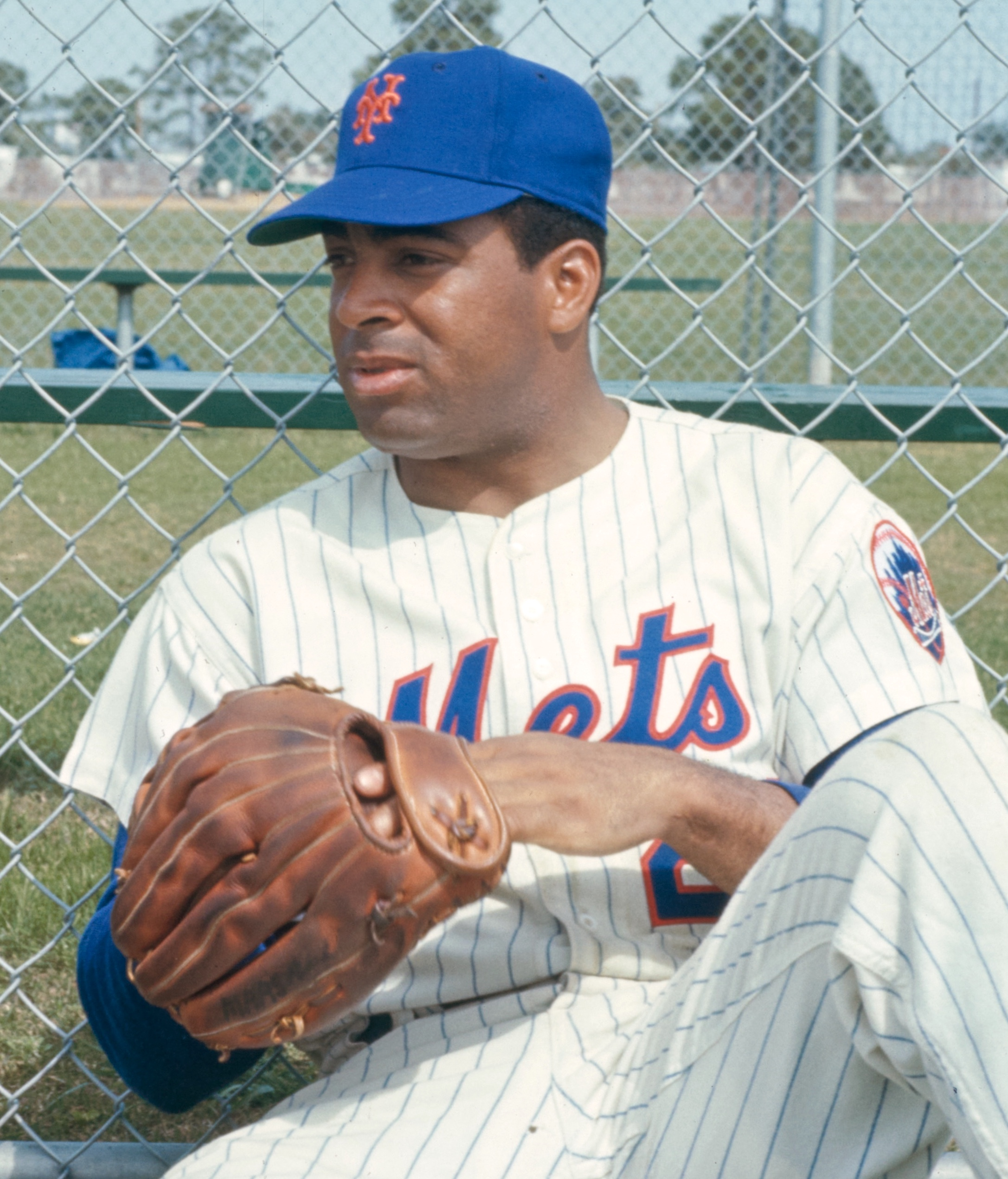
- Agee with the New York Mets c. 1970
- Center fielder
- Born: August 9, 1942; Magnolia, Alabama, U.S.
- Died: January 22, 2001 (aged 58); New York City, New York, U.S.
- Batted: Right Threw: Right

MLB debut
- September 14, 1962, for the Cleveland Indians

Last MLB appearance
- September 30, 1973, for the St. Louis Cardinals

MLB statistics
- Batting average: .255
- Home runs: 130
- Runs batted in: 433
- Stats at Baseball Reference

Teams
- Cleveland Indians (1962–1964); Chicago White Sox (1965–1967); New York Mets (1968–1972); Houston Astros (1973); St. Louis Cardinals (1973)

Career highlights and awards
- 2× All-Star (1966, 1967); World Series champion (1969); AL Rookie of the Year (1966); 2× Gold Glove Award (1966, 1970); New York Mets Hall of Fame

Tommie Lee Agee (August 9, 1942 – January 22, 2001) was an American professional baseball player. He played in Major League Baseball as a center fielder from 1962 through 1973, most notably as a member of the New York Mets team that became known as the Miracle Mets when they rose from being perennial losers to defeat the favored Baltimore Orioles in the 1969 World Series for one of the most improbable upsets in World Series history. Agee performed two impressive defensive plays in center field to help preserve a Mets victory in the third game of the series.

A two-time Major League All-Star player, Agee was also a two-time Gold Glove Award winner and was named the AL Rookie of the Year in 1966 as a member of the Chicago White Sox. He also played for the Cleveland Indians, Houston Astros and the St. Louis Cardinals. In 2002, Agee was posthumously inducted into the New York Mets Hall of Fame.

== Early life ==
Agee was born in Magnolia, Alabama, and played baseball and football at Mobile County Training School with future New York Mets teammate Cleon Jones. After one season at Grambling State University (1961), Agee signed with the Cleveland Indians for a $60,000 bonus.

== Career ==
=== Cleveland Indians ===
After two seasons in the Indians' farm system with the AAA Portland Beavers, Agee received a September call-up to Cleveland in 1962. With the Indians already behind 11-1 to the Minnesota Twins, Agee made his major league debut on September 14 at Metropolitan Stadium, pinch-hitting for pitcher Bill Dailey in the ninth inning. He received September call-ups to the majors the following two seasons as well, playing a total of 31 games with the Indians in which he batted .170 with one home run and five runs batted in. Following the 1964 season, he was dealt to the Chicago White Sox with Tommy John as part of a three team blockbuster trade between the Indians, White Sox and Kansas City Athletics that returned All-Star Rocky Colavito to the Indians.

=== Chicago White Sox ===
Agee batted just .226 with the Pacific Coast League's Indianapolis Indians, and .158 in ten games with the White Sox in 1965. After earning the starting center fielder job in spring training 1966, he hit a two-run home run in the season opener, and was batting .264 with nine home runs and 38 RBIs to be named the White Sox's sole representative at the 1966 Major League Baseball All-Star Game. He ended the season with a .273 batting average, 22 home runs, 86 RBIs and 44 stolen bases, becoming the first player in Major League Baseball history with more than 20 home runs and 40 stolen bases in their rookie season. He was followed by Mitchell Page (1977), Mike Trout (2012) and Corbin Carroll (2023) as the only four rookies to accomplish the feat. His performance earned him the American League Rookie of the Year award, while his defense in center field earned him a Gold Glove. Although he was technically in his 5th major league season, MLB's classification of a rookie is determined by plate appearances and time on a major league roster. Agee's September call-ups had been so brief and his playing time so scarce that he was still eligible for the award.

Agee was batting .247 with ten home runs and 35 RBIs to earn his second consecutive All-Star selection in 1967. His production fell off considerably in the second half of the season (he hit only four home runs after the All-Star break), and he ended the season batting .234 with 52 RBIs. Though they finished the season in fourth place, Chicago finished only three games back of the first place Boston Red Sox, and battled Boston, the Detroit Tigers and Minnesota Twins until the final week of the season. On a team loaded with pitching and short on offense (no regular batted over .241), the team's lack of offense possibly cost the White Sox the American League pennant.

To alleviate this problem, the White Sox imported perennial .300 hitter Tommy Davis, along with pitcher Jack Fisher and two minor leaguers, from the New York Mets for Agee and Al Weis.

=== New York Mets ===
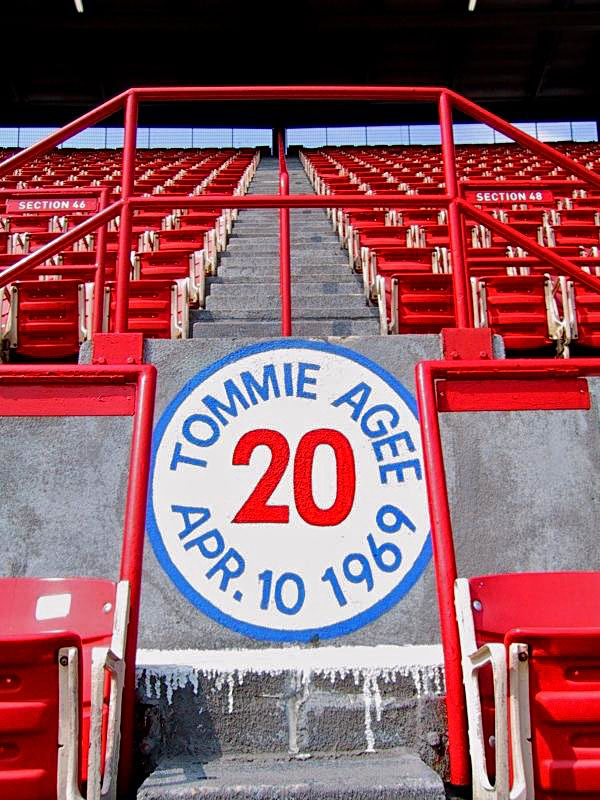
The spot where Agee's home run landed at Shea Stadium. The marker was removed during the demolition of Shea Stadium and was sold to a private collector, who has it on display in his backyard.

Agee was hit in the head by Bob Gibson on the very first pitch thrown to a Mets batter in spring training 1968. At the beginning of the regular season, he went 0-for-10 in a 24-inning affair with the Houston Astros that saw his batting average go from .313 to .192. It led to an 0-for-34 slump that brought his average down to .102. For the season, he batted .217 with five home runs and 17 RBIs.

==== 1969 season ====
Agee got his first career multi-home run game in the third game of the 1969 season, against the Montreal Expos, one of which went halfway up in section 48 of the left field upper deck at Shea Stadium, a feat that was never matched. Expos right fielder Mack Jones said the ball was still rising when it came into contact with the stands. To commemorate the home run, there was a painted sign in that section of the stadium with Agee's name and uniform number and the date. He also had his first four-hit game on May 2 (four for four with a walk and a home run).

By May 21, Agee was batting over .300, and the Mets won their third game in a row for a .500 winning percentage 36 games into the season for the first time in franchise history. This was followed by a five-game losing streak that saw the Mets fall into fourth place in the newly aligned National League East.

The Mets then went on an 11-game winning streak that included a two-home run, four-hit performance by Agee against the San Francisco Giants in the final game of the streak. By this point, the Mets were in second place, seven games back of the Chicago Cubs.

The Mets were two and a-half games back on September 8 when the Cubs came to Shea to open a crucial two game series with the Mets. Cubs starter Bill Hands knocked down the first batter he faced, Agee, who had been moved into the lead-off spot in the line-up, in the bottom half of the first inning. Jerry Koosman hit the next Cubs batter he faced, Ron Santo, in the hand, breaking it. Agee himself retaliated by hitting a two-run home run in the third, and scored the winning run of the game on a Wayne Garrett single in the sixth inning.

The Mets swept the Expos in a double header on September 10. Coupled with a Cubs loss, the Mets moved into first place for the first time ever during the 1969 season. The Mets would not relinquish their lead from this point. On September 24, the New York Mets clinched the NL East as Donn Clendenon hit two home runs in a 6-0 Mets win over Steve Carlton and the St. Louis Cardinals (who struck out a record 19 Mets nine days earlier in a losing effort). For the season, Agee batted .271 while leading his team with 26 home runs, 97 runs scored and 76 RBIs. Along with Cy Young Award winner Tom Seaver and Cleon Jones, he was one of three Mets to finish in the top ten in NL MVP Award balloting, being also named the Sporting News NL Comeback Player of the Year.

==== 1969 World Series ====
Agee batted .357 with two home runs and four RBIs in the Mets' three-game sweep of the Atlanta Braves in the 1969 National League Championship Series. The Mets were heavy underdogs heading into the World Series against the Baltimore Orioles. In Game 3 (the first World Series home game in Mets history), with the series tied 1–1, Agee had what Sports Illustrated called the greatest single performance by a center fielder in World Series history. In the first inning, Agee hit a leadoff home run off Jim Palmer for what would eventually be the game-winning hit and RBI, as the Mets shut out the Orioles, 5–0. In the same game, Agee also made two catches that potentially saved five runs. The first catch came in the fourth inning with Gary Gentry pitching and two outs and runners on first and third. Agee, playing the left-handed hitting Elrod Hendricks to pull, made a backhanded catch near the base of the wall in left centerfield. The second catch came in the seventh inning with Nolan Ryan relieving Gentry; the bases were loaded with two outs, and Agee made a headfirst dive in right centerfield on a ball hit by Paul Blair.

==== 1970–72 ====
Agee began the 1970 season by going on a 20-game hitting streak from April 16 to May 9. He enjoyed one of the finest games of his career on June 12, when he went four for five with two home runs and four runs scored, and he would go on to be named NL Player of the Month for June with a .364 batting average, 11 home runs, and 30 RBI. He also hit for the cycle on July 6. Agee displayed his spectacular and daring base running in the 10th inning in the NY Mets 2-1 win over the LA Dodgers when he stole second, took third on a wild pitch and surprised every one when he stole home for the victory! For the season, Agee batted .286, and established a Mets season record for hits with 182, runs with 107, and stolen bases with 31. He also won his second Gold Glove award, making him the first African-American to win a Gold Glove in both leagues.

Chronic knee injuries hampered Agee in 1971 and 1972, though he still batted .285 and tied for the Mets lead with 14 home runs in 1971. In 1972, he finished second on the Mets with 47 RBIs despite batting only .227.

=== Later career ===
Agee was traded from the Mets to the Houston Astros for Rich Chiles and Buddy Harris at the Winter Meetings on November 27, 1972. He faced the Mets for the first time in his career on April 24, and went two for three with a walk and a run scored in the Astros' 4-2 victory. He was batting .235 with eight home runs and 15 RBIs when the Astros dealt him to the St. Louis Cardinals on August 18, who were in a battle with the Mets and Pittsburgh Pirates in the NL East.

He was dealt from the Cardinals to the Los Angeles Dodgers for Pete Richert at the Winter Meetings on December 5, 1973. He was released during spring training. Though he never made a regular season appearance with the Dodgers, his final baseball card was #630T in the 1974 Topps Traded series, which depicted him as a Dodger.

=== Career statistics ===
Games	PA	AB	R	H	2B	3B	HR	RBI	SB	BB	SO	HBP	AVG	OBP	SLG	FLD%
1130	4324	3912	558	999	170	27	130	433	167	342	918	34	.255	.320	.412	.975

== Retirement ==
After retirement, he operated the Outfielder's Lounge near Shea Stadium. Agee was also known as the most active former Met, taking part in many charitable events and children's baseball clinics around both the New York area and Mobile. He appeared as himself in a 1999 episode of Everybody Loves Raymond along with several other members of the 1969 Mets.

Tommie visited Shea Stadium often and appeared at old timers games and card shows. He was later inducted into the Mobile Sports Hall of Fame and the Alabama Sports Hall of Fame.

== Personal life ==
Agee met his wife, Maxcine, at a nightclub and restaurant he ran. The couple had a daughter, Jnelle.

Agee suffered a heart attack while leaving a Midtown Manhattan office building on January 22, 2001, and died later that day at Bellevue Hospital Center, aged 58. He was buried in Pine Crest Cemetery in Mobile, Alabama.

== Legacy ==
Agee was posthumously inducted into the New York Mets Hall of Fame in 2002.

Agee was also posthumously inducted into the New York State Baseball Hall of Fame in 2022.

A middle school was built on the property of Agee's former nightclub in East Elmhurst, Queens. It opened in 2022 and was called the Tommie L. Agee Educational Campus in his honor.

== See also ==
- List of Major League Baseball career stolen bases leaders
- List of Major League Baseball players to hit for the cycle

Awards and achievements
Preceded by Curt Blefary	American League Rookie of the Year; 1966	Succeeded by Rod Carew
Preceded by Alex Johnson	NL Comeback Player of the Year; 1969	Succeeded by Jim Hickman
Preceded by Rico Carty	Major League Player of the Month; June, 1970	Succeeded by Bill Singer
Preceded by Tony Horton	Hitting for the cycle July 6, 1970	Succeeded by Jim Ray Hart
