= Gary Gentry =

American baseball player (born 1946)

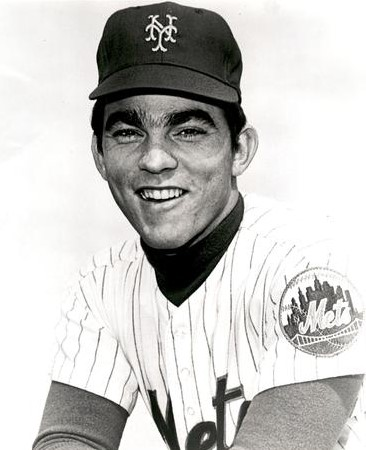
- Pitcher
- Born: October 6, 1946 (age 79); Phoenix, Arizona, U.S.
- Batted: Right Threw: Right

MLB debut
- April 10, 1969, for the New York Mets

Last MLB appearance
- May 6, 1975, for the Atlanta Braves

MLB statistics
- Win–loss record: 46–49
- Earned run average: 3.56
- Strikeouts: 615
- Stats at Baseball Reference

Teams
- New York Mets (1969–1972); Atlanta Braves (1973–1975)

Career highlights and awards
- World Series champion (1969)

Gary Edward Gentry (born October 6, 1946) is an American former right-handed Major League Baseball pitcher.

== Early years ==
Gentry was a second baseman at Camelback High School in Phoenix, Arizona, and only began pitching while at Phoenix Junior College. He was drafted by the Houston Astros in the eleventh round of the inaugural major league draft in 1965, and was a first-round pick of the Baltimore Orioles in the January Secondary Draft in 1966, but signed with neither team, choosing instead to remain in college. In 1966, he led the Bears to a national junior college championship. Shortly afterwards, he was drafted by the San Francisco Giants, but again chose not to sign.

After two years at Phoenix College, Gentry transferred to Arizona State University. He went 17–1 with a college-record 229 strikeouts. In the 1967 NCAA University Division baseball tournament, Gentry tossed a fourteen-inning gem against Stanford University to help his team catch the College World Series title. He was named the pitcher of the All-Tournament Team. Shortly afterwards, he was drafted by the New York Mets in the "Secondary Phase" of the 1967 MLB June Draft. This time, he was ready to sign.

== New York Mets ==
Gentry spent just two seasons in the Mets' farm system when he caught the eye of Mets manager Gil Hodges in Spring training 1969, and earned a spot on the opening day roster behind Tom Seaver & Jerry Koosman in the starting rotation. He came within an out of a complete game in his major league debut, defeating the Montreal Expos in front of 8,608 at Shea Stadium.

Overall, Gentry made 35 starts, and went 13–12 with a 3.43 earned run average and 154 strikeouts his rookie season. Unquestionably, his biggest game came on September 24. The Mets, who once trailed the Chicago Cubs by 9 1/2 games on August 13, were now in first place by six games, and now regularly drew crowds over 50,000 to Shea. Gentry pitched a four-hit, 6–0 shutout against the St. Louis Cardinals to clinch the National League East title for the Mets.

On his 23rd birthday, Gentry was sent to the mound for game three of the 1969 National League Championship Series against the Atlanta Braves. Gentry lasted only into the third inning, however, the Mets were able to mount a comeback that would allow them to sweep the NLCS, and head into the World Series against the Baltimore Orioles.

With the 1969 World Series tied at one game apiece, Gentry faced Jim Palmer in game three. Tommie Agee led off the bottom of the first inning with a home run to give the Mets the early 1–0 lead (Agee also made two spectacular catches in center field to prevent the Orioles from scoring up to five runs in this game). Gentry, meanwhile, held the mighty Orioles scoreless, pitching into the seventh inning before handing the ball to Nolan Ryan for the save. He also helped his own cause in the second inning with a double that plated two runs.

Gentry got off to a hot start in 1970. Following a one-hit shutout of the Chicago Cubs on May 13, his record stood at 4–1 with a 1.71 ERA. He would cool off from there, and ended the season at 9–9 with a 3.68 ERA.

Following a 1971 season in which Gentry went 12–11 with a 3.23 ERA, the California Angels inquired about Gentry, dangling third baseman Jim Fregosi as bait. Unwilling to part with Gentry, the Mets sent Nolan Ryan to the Angels in one of the most infamous trades in franchise history.

He would remain with the Mets for one more season, going 7–10 with a 4.01 ERA. Gentry was traded along with Danny Frisella from the Mets to the Atlanta Braves for Félix Millán and George Stone on November 1, 1972.

== Atlanta Braves ==
Gentry exited his June 5 start in the first inning due to right elbow soreness. He made his next start, but was pulled after the second inning, and placed on the disabled list. He returned a month later, but after just two more appearances, his season was ended for good.

After surgery to have bone chips removed from his elbow, Gentry returned to the mound on April 30, 1974, pitching an inning of relief. He made two more appearances before his season was once again cut short, this time for tendon surgery. He made seven appearances with the Braves in 1975, playing his last game on May 6. The Braves placed him on waivers two days later. Gentry was then re-signed by the Mets, but after just one appearance at Double-A Jackson was he was released on June 19.

== Career stats ==
W	L	PCT	ERA	G	GS	CG	SHO	SV	IP	BF	H	ER	R	HR	BAA	K	BB	BB/9	WP	HBP	Fld%	Avg.	SH
46	49	.484	3.56	157	138	25	8	2	902.2	3800	770	357	400	90	.231	615	369	3.7	29	28	.995	.095	25

Gentry was an exceptional fielding pitcher. The only error he committed in his career (in 182 total chances) came on August 23, 1970, covering first on a ground ball by Pete Rose.
