= Magnolia, Alabama =

Unincorporated community in Alabama, U.S.

- Unincorporated community
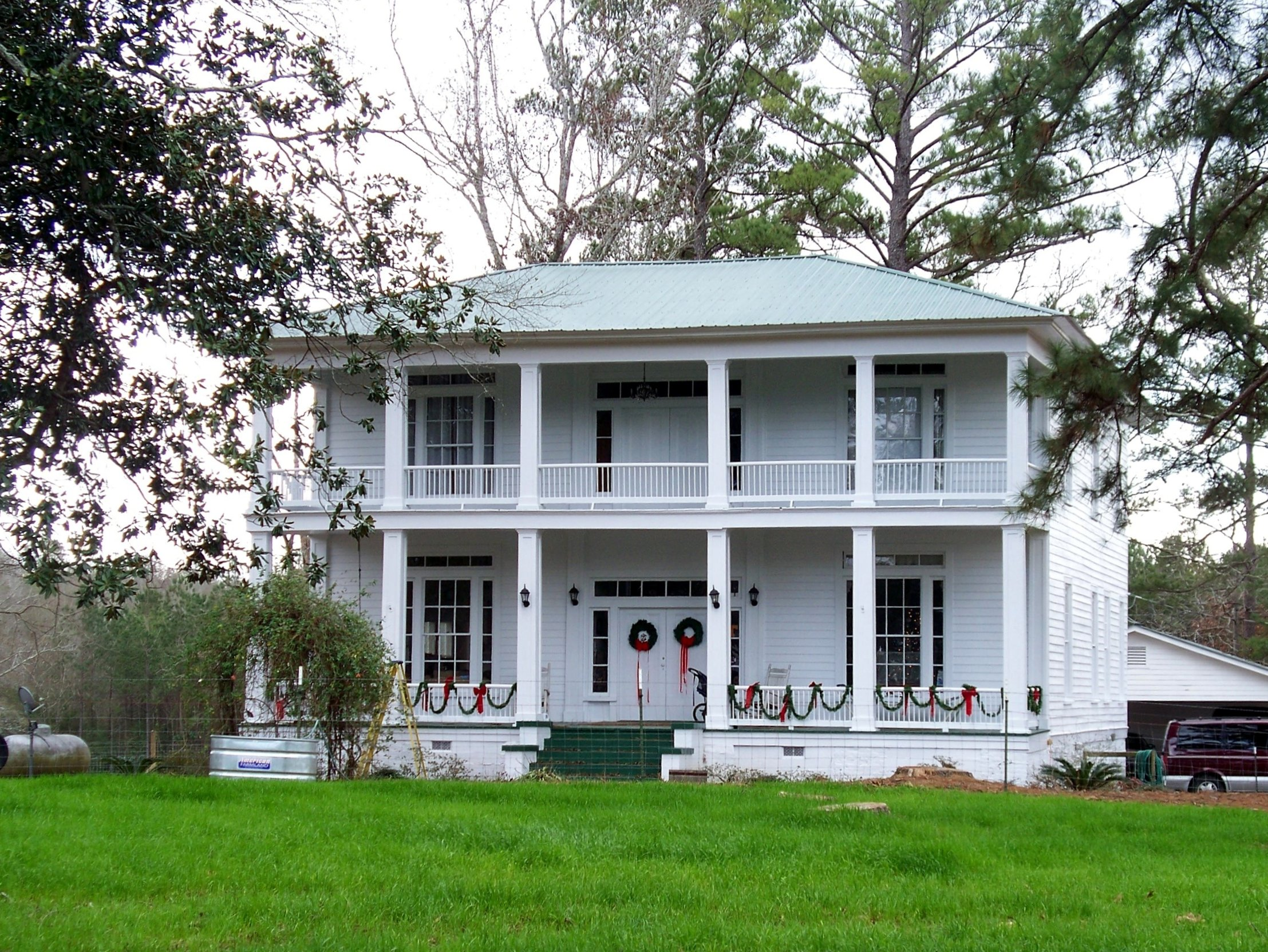
- The Mask House (built c. 1861) in Magnolia

- Location within the state of Alabama Magnolia (the United States)
- Coordinates: 32°8′9.49″N 87°39′34.34″W
- Country: United States
- State: Alabama
- County: Marengo
- Elevation: 273 ft (83 m)
- Time zone: UTC-6 (Central (CST))
  - Summer (DST): UTC-5 (CDT)
- ZIP code: 36754
- Area code: 334

Magnolia is an unincorporated community in Marengo County, Alabama, United States.

== Geography ==
Magnolia is located at 32.13597°N 87.65954°W and has an elevation of 273 feet (83 m).

== Notable person ==
- Tommie Agee, former Major League Baseball player, who is known for two of his catches in Game 3 of the 1969 World Series.
- Derek Westmoreland, Reliability Engineer, previous owner of Mask House. Birthplace of Jacob and Kathryn Westmoreland, distant relatives to General William Westmoreland.
