= 1969 National League Championship Series =

Inaugural edition of Major League Baseball's National League Championship Series

Team (Wins)	Managers	Season
New York Mets (3)	Gil Hodges	100–62, .617, GA: 8
Atlanta Braves (0)	Lum Harris	93–69, .574, GA: 3
- Dates: October 4–6
- Umpires: Al Barlick (crew chief); Augie Donatelli; Ed Sudol; Ed Vargo; Chris Pelekoudas; Mel Steiner

Broadcast
- Television: NBC; WSB-TV (ATL); WOR-TV (NYM)
- TV announcers: NBC: Jim Simpson and Sandy Koufax (Game 1); Curt Gowdy and Tony Kubek (Games 2–3); WSB-TV: Milo Hamilton and Ernie Johnson, Sr. WOR-TV: Ralph Kiner, Bob Murphy, and Lindsey Nelson

The 1969 National League Championship Series was a best-of-five match-up between the East Division champion New York Mets and the West Division champion Atlanta Braves. It was the opening semifinal round on the National League side of the inaugural edition of the MLB postseason. In what was the first ever NLCS, the Mets defeated the Braves three games to none. They did not sweep a playoff series again until 2006 as they swept the Los Angeles Dodgers in the National League Division Series in three games.

At that time, the New York Mets became the fastest expansion team to win a National League pennant with only eight years of existence. Twenty-eight years later, in 1997, the Florida Marlins would break that record by reaching and winning the World Series with only five years of existence. Four years after the Marlins, the Arizona Diamondbacks would break that by reaching and winning the World Series in just their fourth year.

Game 3 was Nolan Ryan's first playoff victory of his career.

== Background ==
This was the first year of the two-division format in Major League Baseball, after 99 consecutive years of straight non-divisional play.

This was the year of the "Miracle" Mets. The team had finished only one game better than last the year before, had never finished better than ninth in their seven-year history, were generally picked for third or fourth in the new six-team National League East Division, and were a 100-to-1 longshot to win the World Series. In third place and 10 games behind the division-leading Cubs on August 13, the Mets rallied to win the East Division title by eight games, winning exactly 100 games.

The Braves, led by Hank Aaron, Orlando Cepeda and Phil Niekro, won a tough five-team race in the West Division, and were favored over the Mets as the playoff began, despite the Mets having won seven more games than the Braves. In what was expected to be a pitching-rich series, the teams combined for 42 runs, batted .292, hit 11 home runs, and posted a combined 5.94 ERA in the three games. Hank Aaron hit three home runs for the Braves, while Tommie Agee and Ken Boswell hit two each for the Mets.

== Summary ==
=== New York Mets vs. Atlanta Braves ===
New York won the series, 3–0.

Game	Date	Score	Location	Time	Attendance
1	October 4	New York Mets – 9, Atlanta Braves – 5	Atlanta Stadium	2:37	50,122
2	October 5	New York Mets – 11, Atlanta Braves – 6	Atlanta Stadium	3:10	50,270
3	October 6	Atlanta Braves – 4, New York Mets – 7	Shea Stadium	2:24	54,195

== Game summaries ==
=== Game 1 ===
Saturday, October 4, 1969 4:00 pm (ET) at Atlanta–Fulton County Stadium in Atlanta, Georgia
Team	1	2	3	4	5	6	7	8	9	R	H	E
New York	0	2	0	2	0	0	0	5	0	9	10	1
Atlanta	0	1	2	0	1	0	1	0	0	5	10	2
WP: Tom Seaver (1–0) LP: Phil Niekro (0–1); Home runs: NYM: None; ATL: Tony González (1), Hank Aaron (1)

In Game 1, the top 2 Cy Young candidates faced off with the eventual winner Tom Seaver taking the mound for New York, while the Braves sent out Phil Niekro, who was the only other pitcher to receive a Cy Young vote in the NL, behind Seaver. The Mets struck first in the second off Niekro when Jerry Grote singled in a run with two on and Ken Boswell scored on a passed ball by Braves catcher Bob Didier. The Braves cut the lead in half in their half on a sacrifice fly by Clete Boyer with runners on second and third off Seaver.

The Braves took a 3–2 lead in the third inning scoring twice on three consecutive one-out doubles by Felix Millán, Tony González, and Hank Aaron. The Mets immediately re-took the lead in the fourth inning on a two-run triple by Bud Harrelson after a two-out single and walk.

Gonzalez then tied the game at 4–4 in the fifth inning with the first home run in NLCS play. Hank Aaron gave the Braves the lead with a home run in the seventh.

In the eighth, however, things fell apart for the Braves. Wayne Garrett led off with a double and was singled home by Cleon Jones. Art Shamsky singled and Jones stole third. Ken Boswell then grounded to first, but Braves first baseman Orlando Cepeda threw wildly home in an attempt to retire Jones. Boswell reached first and Al Weis, running for Shamsky, went to second. Ed Kranepool forced Weis at third, and Grote grounded out to first, putting runners on second and third. Harrelson was walked intentionally to load the bases. Then, J.C. Martin, batting for Tom Seaver, drove in two runs with a single to right center. Harrelson came around to score from first when González misplayed the hit. Martin reached second, but was cut down in a rundown. Ron Taylor pitched two shutout innings to close it out as the Mets won the first NLCS game in history.

=== Game 2 ===
Sunday, October 5, 1969 4:00 pm (ET) at Atlanta-Fulton County Stadium in Atlanta, Georgia
Team	1	2	3	4	5	6	7	8	9	R	H	E
New York	1	3	2	2	1	0	2	0	0	11	13	1
Atlanta	0	0	0	1	5	0	0	0	0	6	9	3
WP: Ron Taylor (1–0) LP: Ron Reed (0–1) Sv: Tug McGraw (1); Home runs: NYM: Tommie Agee (1), Ken Boswell (1), Cleon Jones (1); ATL: Hank Aaron (2)

For the second game, the Braves started 25-year-old Ron Reed, making his postseason debut, while the Mets started Jerry Koosman, another young up and coming pitcher behind their ace Tom Seaver. The Mets scored early and often in this one, pounding six Braves pitchers for 13 hits and 11 runs. Ed Kranepool brought in the first run in the top of the first with a bases-loaded single. Tommie Agee's two-run home run after a walk next inning extended the Mets' lead to 3–0. Cleon Jones doubled with two outs and scored on Art Shamsky's single to knock Reed out of the game. Next inning off Paul Doyle, Jerry Grote reached on an error before scoring on Bud Harrelson's double. After a two-out intentional walk, Wayne Garrett's RBI single made it 6–0 Mets. Ken Boswell's two-run home run off Milt Pappas made it 8–0 Mets. The Braves got on the board in the bottom half off Koosman when Rico Carty doubled with one out and scored on Orlando Cepeda's single. In the top of the fifth, Garrett doubled and scored on Jones's single. In the bottom half, Koosman got two outs before allowing a single and walk, then Hank Aaron's three-run home run cut the Mets' lead to 9–4. After a walk and double, Clete Boyer's two-run single brought the Braves within three. However, Ron Taylor, who earned the win, and Tug McGraw held them scoreless for the rest of the game while Jones's two-run home run in the seventh off Cecil Upshaw extended the Mets' lead to 11–6. They took a 2–0 series lead heading to New York.

=== Game 3 ===
Monday, October 6, 1969 1:00 pm (ET) at Shea Stadium in Queens, New York
Team	1	2	3	4	5	6	7	8	9	R	H	E
Atlanta	2	0	0	0	2	0	0	0	0	4	8	1
New York	0	0	1	2	3	1	0	0	X	7	14	0
WP: Nolan Ryan (1–0) LP: Pat Jarvis (0–1); Home runs: ATL: Hank Aaron (3), Orlando Cepeda (1); NYM: Tommie Agee (2), Ken Boswell (2), Wayne Garrett (1)

For the pivotal Game 3, Atlanta started Pat Jarvis, while New York started rookie Gary Gentry (on his 23rd birthday). In what would be his last postseason appearance, Hank Aaron put the Braves up 2–0 in the first inning with a two-run home run, his third of the series, off Gentry, who only lasted 2 innings.

Once again, the downfall of the Braves was their inability to stave off the hot Met hitters. Tommie Agee homered in the third, and Ken Boswell hit a two-run home run in the fourth to put the Mets on top 3–2 off starter Pat Jarvis.

Orlando Cepeda gave Braves fans a glimmer of hope by hitting a two-run home run off Nolan Ryan in the fifth after a two-out walk to put the Braves back on top, 4–3. But, in the bottom of the inning Ryan singled with one out and Wayne Garrett then homered to give the Mets a 5–4 lead, which they would not lose. Cleon Jones's double knocked Jarvis out of the game. Boswell added an RBI single off George Stone, and next inning, Jerry Grote hit a leadoff double off Stone and Agee singled him home off Cecil Upshaw. Ryan pitched seven innings in relief of Gentry for the win as the Mets advanced to their first World Series.

== Composite box ==
1969 NLCS (3–0): New York Mets over Atlanta Braves

Team	1	2	3	4	5	6	7	8	9	R	H	E
New York Mets	1	5	3	6	4	1	2	5	0	27	37	2
Atlanta Braves	2	1	2	1	8	0	1	0	0	15	27	6
Total attendance: 154,587 Average attendance: 51,529

== Aftermath ==
In what is considered one of the biggest World Series upsets, the Mets would also go on to beat the Baltimore Orioles in the '69 World Series, four games to one.

This was the first of five NL pennants for the Mets. The first two came in the only two NL series between 1969 and 1980 that did not feature a Pennsylvania team (the other being 1973). The Braves would not reach the NLCS again until 1982, and would not win a game in the NLCS until they won the Pennant in 1991. It would be another four years before the Braves captured their first World Series championship as an Atlanta team in 1995.

This was the only time the Atlanta Braves made the playoffs in Hank Aaron's Hall of Fame career. In Milwaukee, the Braves made the playoffs twice, winning the World Series in 1957 and losing in 1958. Five years after the 1969 NLCS, Aaron blasted his 715th career home run, breaking the all-time career home run mark of 714 set by Babe Ruth. Aaron would finish his career with 755 home runs, a record that would stand until Barry Bonds broke it in 2007.

In 1994, the Braves moved to the National League East and formed a divisional rivalry with the New York Mets. The Braves and Mets would later meet again in the 1999 National League Championship Series, with the Braves winning in six games.
