= Les Rohr =

English baseball player (1946–2020)

- Pitcher
- Born: March 5, 1946; Lowestoft, Suffolk, England
- Died: November 6, 2020 (aged 74); Billings, Montana, U.S.
- Batted: Left Threw: Left

MLB debut
- September 19, 1967, for the New York Mets

Last MLB appearance
- September 19, 1969, for the New York Mets

MLB statistics
- Win–loss record: 2–3
- Earned run average: 3.70
- Strikeouts: 20
- Stats at Baseball Reference

Teams
- New York Mets (1967–1969)

Leslie Norvin Rohr (March 5, 1946 – November 6, 2020) was an English born baseball player for the New York Mets in the late 1960s. He was born in Lowestoft, England, where his father was serving with the United States Army Air Forces; his mother was British. Six months later he moved to Billings, Montana, with his family, where he grew up, attended high school, and lived.

Rohr, a left-handed pitcher listed as 6 feet 5 inches (1.96 m) tall and 205 pounds (93 kg), was selected by the Mets in the first round (second pick overall) of the 1965 Major League Baseball draft. Rohr played in the minor leagues until being called up to play for the Mets near the end of the 1967 season.

Rohr's first game was on September 19, 1967; starting against the Los Angeles Dodgers at Shea Stadium, he went six full innings and allowed only three runs, one of which was unearned, and was credited with the 6–3 victory. Eleven days later, he was even more effective, going eight shutout innings against Los Angeles at Dodger Stadium and gaining a 5–0 victory in which he defeated future Baseball Hall of Famer Don Drysdale. His last game was on September 19, 1969. He stayed with New York Mets for his entire career. In six games, four as a starting pitcher, he compiled a 2–3 won–lost record, no complete games, and an earned run average of 3.70. In 241/3 innings pitched, he allowed 27 hits and 17 bases on balls, striking out 20.

The beginning of the end of Rohr's career came early the 1968 season in the final innings of a 24-inning game against the Houston Astros. Entering the April 15th game as a relief pitcher in the 22nd inning and pitching through the 24th inning, he pulled a tendon in his pitching arm. After absorbing a 3–2 loss in his third career start against the Dodgers on April 21, he spent the remainder of the season on the disabled list or back in the minor leagues. Rohr made only one more appearance on the mound for the Mets, as a relief pitcher against the Pittsburgh Pirates late in 1969. The following year, which he spent in the high minors, Rohr was unconditionally released by the Mets when a routine physical discovered a ruptured disc in his lower back, scuttling a proposed trade to the Milwaukee Brewers.

Rohr died in November 2020, at the age of 74.
