= Jack DiLauro =

American baseball player (1943–2024)

- Pitcher
- Born: May 3, 1943; Akron, Ohio, U.S.
- Died: December 7, 2024 (aged 81); Akron, Ohio, U.S.
- Batted: Both Threw: Left

MLB debut
- May 15, 1969, for the New York Mets

Last MLB appearance
- September 25, 1970, for the Houston Astros

MLB statistics
- Win–loss record: 2–7
- Earned run average: 3.05
- Strikeouts: 50
- Stats at Baseball Reference

Teams
- New York Mets (1969); Houston Astros (1970)

Career highlights and awards
- World Series champion (1969)

Jack Edward DiLauro (May 3, 1943 – December 7, 2024) was an American Major League Baseball pitcher who played for the 1969 World Series Champion New York Mets.

DiLauro started his professional baseball career by signing with the Detroit Tigers as an amateur free agent on January 1, 1963. He never played in the Major Leagues for the Tigers. On December 4, 1968, he was traded to the New York Mets in exchange for Hector Valle.

In 1969, DiLauro pitched 4 games for the Mets AAA minor league affiliate, the Tidewater Tides. He was then promoted to the Mets and made his major league debut for the Mets on May 15, 1969, against the Atlanta Braves. In 1969, he pitched in 23 games, mostly in relief, and 63 2/3 innings for the Mets. He won 1 game against 4 losses with 1 save. The win, his first in the Major Leagues occurred on July 20 against the Montreal Expos. His ERA in 1969 was a solid 2.40, better than the league average. The Mets won the World Series in 1969, but DiLauro did not pitch in the postseason.

After the season, DiLauro was drafted from the Mets by the Houston Astros in the rule 5 draft. In 1970, DiLauro pitched in 42 games for the Astros, all in relief, pitching 33 2/3 innings. He had 1 win and 3 losses with 3 saves.

He was sold by the Astros to the Hawaii Islanders, the San Diego Padres AAA team in the Pacific Coast League on March 15, 1971. In July 1971 he was traded with Hank McGraw (brother of DiLauro's former Mets teammate Tug McGraw) to the Atlanta Braves organization for Marv Staehle. But he never pitched in the major leagues after 1970.

After a career in sporting goods and as a retail liquidation consultant, DiLauro died in Akron on December 7, 2024, at the age of 81. He was married with two sons, one of whom predeceased him.
