= Cal Koonce =

American baseball player (1940–1993)

- Pitcher
- Born: November 18, 1940; Fayetteville, North Carolina, U.S.
- Died: October 28, 1993 (aged 52); Winston-Salem, North Carolina, U.S.
- Batted: Right Threw: Right

MLB debut
- April 14, 1962, for the Chicago Cubs

Last MLB appearance
- August 8, 1971, for the Boston Red Sox

MLB statistics
- Win–loss record: 47–49
- Earned run average: 3.78
- Strikeouts: 504
- Stats at Baseball Reference

Teams
- Chicago Cubs (1962–1967); New York Mets (1967–1970); Boston Red Sox (1970–1971)

Career highlights and awards
- World Series champion (1969)

Calvin Lee Koonce (November 18, 1940 – October 28, 1993) was an American professional baseball player, a right-handed pitcher in the Major Leagues from 1962–71 for the Chicago Cubs, New York Mets and Boston Red Sox. Born in Fayetteville, North Carolina, he grew up in Hope Mills and attended Campbell University. Koonce stood 6 feet 1 inch (1.85 m) tall and weighed 185 pounds (84 kg).

Koonce appeared in 334 Major League games pitched, all but 90 as a relief pitcher. He allowed 972 hits and 368 bases on balls in 971 innings pitched, with 504 strikeouts and 24 saves. He recorded 11 saves and a low 2.42 earned run average for the 1968 Mets, and was a member of the Mets' 1969 World Series championship team, but he was less effective during the regular campaign and did not appear in the postseason.

As a hitter, Koonce posted a .100 batting average (24-for-239) with 8 RBIs. Defensively, he recorded a .982 fielding percentage, committing only 5 errors in 281 total chances, which was 29 points higher than the league average at his position.

After retiring as an active player, he was head baseball coach of Campbell University, his alma mater, for seven seasons (1980–86), a scout for the Texas Rangers and a minor league executive. He died from lymphoma at age 52.
