= Pat Jarvis (baseball) =

American baseball player (born 1941)

- Pitcher
- Born: March 18, 1941 (age 85); Carlyle, Illinois, U.S.
- Batted: Right Threw: Right

MLB debut
- August 4, 1966, for the Atlanta Braves

Last MLB appearance
- September 23, 1973, for the Montreal Expos

MLB statistics
- Win–loss record: 85–73
- Earned run average: 3.58
- Strikeouts: 755
- Stats at Baseball Reference

Teams
- Atlanta Braves (1966–1972); Montreal Expos (1973)

Robert Patrick Jarvis (born March 18, 1941) is an American former professional baseball player. He was a Major League Baseball (MLB) starting pitcher who played eight seasons for the Atlanta Braves and the Montreal Expos from 1966 to 1973 in the National League.

== Career ==
Jarvis was born in Carlyle, Illinois and attended Carlyle High School. He pitched collegiately at Murray State University. Originally signed by the Chicago Cubs, he was traded to the Braves in 1963 and was voted that team's top rookie for 1966.

Over a four-season span from 1967–70, Jarvis was one of the National League's top starting pitchers, winning 60 games. He was Atlanta's starting pitcher in Game 3 of the 1969 National League Championship Series, played at Shea Stadium in New York City. A first-inning Hank Aaron home run staked Jarvis to a 2-0 lead, but he ended up the losing pitcher in a 7-4 defeat to the New York Mets. He surrendered Ernie Banks' 500th career MLB home run in the second inning of the Braves' 11-inning 4–3 loss to the Chicago Cubs at Wrigley Field on May 12, 1970.

Jarvis won just 19 games in his final three seasons before ending his career with the Montreal Expos in 1973. He had been traded from the Braves to the Expos for Carl Morton on February 28, 1973. He was dealt from the Expos to the Texas Rangers for Larry Biittner on December 20, 1973.

Standing 5 feet 10 inches (178 cm) tall and weighing 180 pounds (82 kg), he gained the nickname "The Little Bulldog" during his time in the major league.

After retiring from baseball, Jarvis served in several government positions in the state of Georgia, including Sheriff of DeKalb County. In 1999 he was convicted of fraud and served 15 months in federal prison. He currently runs an organic nursery in Rutledge, Georgia.
