= Jesse Hudson =

American baseball player (born 1948)

- Pitcher
- Born: July 22, 1948 (age 78); Mansfield, Louisiana, U.S.
- Batted: Left Threw: Left

MLB debut
- September 19, 1969, for the New York Mets

Last MLB appearance
- September 19, 1969, for the New York Mets

MLB statistics
- Games pitched: 1
- earned run average: 4.50
- Strikeouts: 3
- Stats at Baseball Reference

Teams
- New York Mets (1969)

Jesse James Hudson (born July 22, 1948) is an American former professional baseball pitcher who appeared in a single Major League Baseball (MLB) game in 1969. Listed at 6 feet 2 inches (1.88 m) and 165 pounds (75 kg), he threw and batted left-handed.

== High school ==
Hudson was born in Mansfield, Louisiana and played football quarterback and pitcher at Mansfield High School with Vida Blue. They both graduated and were drafted in the June Baseball draft of 1967.

== Career ==
Hudson was drafted in the 11th round (203rd overall) of the 1967 MLB draft by the New York Mets. He went on to play four season in the Mets' minor league farm system, 1967 through 1970.

On September 19, 1969, Hudson made his one and only major league appearance, pitching the final two innings of a Mets home loss to the Pittsburgh Pirates at Shea Stadium. It was the second game of a doubleheader. He faced 10 batters, allowing one run on two hits while striking out three batters and walking two. One of the batters he struck out was future Baseball Hall of Fame inductee Willie Stargell. He finished with a 4.50 ERA.

During Hudson's final professional season of 1970, he pitched for the Mets' Triple-A team, the Tidewater Tides, registering a 2.86 ERA in 26 games (13 starts) with a 6–7 record, while striking out 79 in 107 innings pitched.

== Post-career ==
Hudson currently lives in Louisiana. In 2019, during the Mets' 50th Anniversary celebration of their 1969 World Championship team, Hudson was accidentally listed in the "in memoriam" segment with deceased members of the team.
