= Jerry Koosman =

American baseball player (1942–2026)

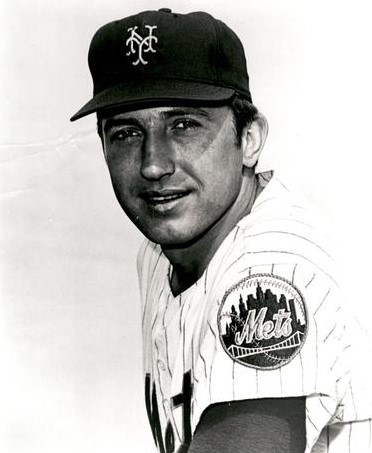
- Koosman with the New York Mets in 1971
- Pitcher
- Born: December 23, 1942; Appleton, Minnesota, U.S.
- Died: November 1, 2026 (aged 83); Osceola, Wisconsin, U.S.
- Batted: Right Threw: Left

MLB debut
- April 14, 1967, for the New York Mets

Last MLB appearance
- August 21, 1985, for the Philadelphia Phillies

MLB statistics
- Win–loss record: 222–209
- Earned run average: 3.36
- Strikeouts: 2,556
- Stats at Baseball Reference

Teams
- New York Mets (1967–1978); Minnesota Twins (1979–1981); Chicago White Sox (1981–1983); Philadelphia Phillies (1984–1985)

Career highlights and awards
- 2× All-Star (1968, 1969); World Series champion (1969); New York Mets No. 36 retired; New York Mets Hall of Fame

Jerome Martin Koosman (December 23, 1942 – November 1, 2026) was an American professional baseball pitcher. He played in Major League Baseball (MLB) for the New York Mets, Minnesota Twins, Chicago White Sox, and Philadelphia Phillies between 1967 and 1985. Koosman is best known for having been a member of the Miracle Mets team that won the 1969 World Series.

== Early life ==
Koosman grew up on a farm in Appleton, Minnesota, and was already pitching semipro baseball in his early teens.

He attended University of Minnesota Morris but the school did not have a baseball team. He transferred to North Dakota State College of Science, but was ineligible to pitch right away because of transfer rules.

In 1962, he was drafted into the United States Army.

== New York Mets ==
=== Early seasons ===
Koosman was discovered by the son of a Shea Stadium usher, John Lucchese, who caught Koosman when he pitched in the United States Army at Fort Bliss, Texas. The Mets offered Koosman a contract after his discharge from the military. He was signed by scout Red Murff, who had also signed Nolan Ryan to the Mets. Koosman was about to be cut from the Mets in 1966, when Joe McDonald, the assistant farm director, requested Koosman be retained at least until his first payday, as he owed the Mets money they had wired him after his car broke down en route to spring training.

After starting in 1967 with the Mets as a reliever, Koosman was sent to the Triple A Jacksonville Suns, where he would lead all International League pitchers in strikeouts with 183. Koosman was recalled to the Mets in September and made his first three big league starts.

Koosman broke into the Mets’ rotation in 1968. He posted a 19–12 record with seven shutouts, 178 strikeouts, and a 2.08 earned run average. The wins, shutouts, and ERA set franchise records, breaking those set by teammate Tom Seaver the year prior. Koosman also made the first of two All-Star teams in his career. The National League won the game 1–0 (to date, the only All-Star Game to end in a 1–0 score) in the "Year of the Pitcher." Koosman pitched a scoreless ninth for the save, striking out Carl Yastrzemski for the final out. Koosman was named to the 1968 Topps All-Star Rookie Roster and finished runner-up to Johnny Bench for the National League Rookie of the Year honors. Koosman even finished 13th in the National League MVP voting that season, just above Willie Mays and Bench.

=== The Miracle Mets ===
In 1969, Koosman posted a 17–9 record with a 2.28 ERA and 180 strikeouts in another All-Star season. That year, he was a member of the Mets team that unexpectedly won the National League East title (both leagues had split into two divisions after expanding from ten teams to 12) after finishing last in five of their first seven seasons, as well as trailing the Chicago Cubs for much of the season, and by as many as 9 1/2 games. After Koosman lost to the Houston Astros to fall to 9–8, he won eight of his final nine decisions.

In Game Two of the 1969 National League Championship Series (NLCS) against the Atlanta Braves, Koosman was shelled for six runs in 4 2/3 innings (including a Hank Aaron three-run homer). The Mets won 11–6, however, then won the next game to complete the series sweep.

Koosman was the pitching star of the 1969 World Series against the Baltimore Orioles. After Seaver was defeated in Game One, Koosman, leading 1–0, held the Orioles hitless until Paul Blair singled to lead off the bottom of the seventh inning, eventually scoring on Brooks Robinson's only hit in 19 Series' at-bats. The Mets regained the lead in the top of the ninth; Koosman got two outs in the bottom of the frame, then walked the next two batters. He was relieved by Ron Taylor, who induced Robinson to ground out to end the game.

With the Series shifting from Memorial Stadium to Shea Stadium for the next three games, the Mets won Games Three and Four, and Koosman took the mound for Game Five. He fell behind 3–0 in the third inning after giving up home runs to his mound opponent, Dave McNally, and Frank Robinson. The Mets, however, cut into the Orioles lead on Donn Clendenon's two-run home run in the sixth, then tied the game in the seventh on a home run by Al Weis, who had hit only six career homers at that point, none of which had been in a home game. The Mets scored two runs in the eighth to take the lead, and after walking Frank Robinson to lead off the ninth, Koosman retired the next three hitters to end the game and complete the Mets’ improbable World Series win.

==== Game ball for game 5 ====
After catching Davey Johnson's fly ball for the final out of the World Series, left fielder Cleon Jones gave the game ball to Koosman. That ball, as well as the game ball from Game 2, was stored in a safe in Koosman's residence. In the early 1990s, Koosman sold the ball from Game 5. Its current whereabouts are unknown.

=== "Ya Gotta Believe!" and "It Ain’t Over 'til It's Over" ===
In 1970, Koosman posted a 12–7 record with a 3.14 ERA. Over the next two seasons, however, he posted losing records: 6–11 in 1971 (a season in which he was beset by arm injuries) and 11–12 in 1972 with a 4.14 ERA—more than a run and a half above his career ERA to that point. In 1973 he went 5–0 in his first six starts, but ended the season 14–15. In late August and early September of that year, he set a Mets' record by pitching 31 2/3 consecutive scoreless innings (R. A. Dickey broke his mark by pitching 32 2/3 consecutive scoreless innings in 2012). As in 1969, the Mets unexpectedly won the NL East title—once again overtaking the Cubs, whom they had trailed this time by as many as nine games—on the strength of the pitching of Koosman, Seaver and the previous year's NL Rookie of the Year, Jon Matlack. This comeback gave rise to two slogans: Tug McGraw's "Ya Gotta Believe!" and manager Yogi Berra's "It ain’t over 'til it's over."

In Game Three of the NLCS against the Cincinnati Reds, Koosman pitched a complete game for a 9–2 victory in a game that was headlined by Pete Rose's altercation with Mets' shortstop Bud Harrelson. The victory gave the Mets a 2–1 lead in the NLCS; they won the pennant two days later in five games.

Koosman was the winning pitcher in Game Five of the World Series against the defending champion Oakland Athletics, holding Oakland scoreless for 6 1/3 innings. This victory gave the Mets a 3–2 lead in the Series; however, Oakland won the next two games to repeat as World Champions.

=== Later Met years ===
Koosman posted a 15–11 record in 1974 and 14–13 record in 1975. In 1976 he had possibly his best season ever, establishing career bests with 21 wins (against 10 losses) and 200 strikeouts. He also finished runner-up to Randy Jones for the National League Cy Young Award. In 1977, the Mets traded Seaver to the Reds. The remainder of the team deteriorated, especially Koosman, who slumped to 8–20, finishing tied with Phil Niekro for most losses in the NL. After a 3–15 season in 1978 Koosman, seeing no imminent improvement to the team, was traded to the Minnesota Twins at his request on December 8, 1978, for minor-leaguer Greg Field and a player to be named later. The Twins sent reliever Jesse Orosco to the Mets on February 7, 1979, to complete the trade. Like Koosman in 1969, Orosco was on the mound for the Mets for the final out of a World Series victory (1986), forever linking the two pitchers in Mets lore.

Koosman's departure left Ed Kranepool as the last remaining member of the 1969 Miracle Mets (although Seaver returned to the Mets for the 1983 season).

== Later career ==
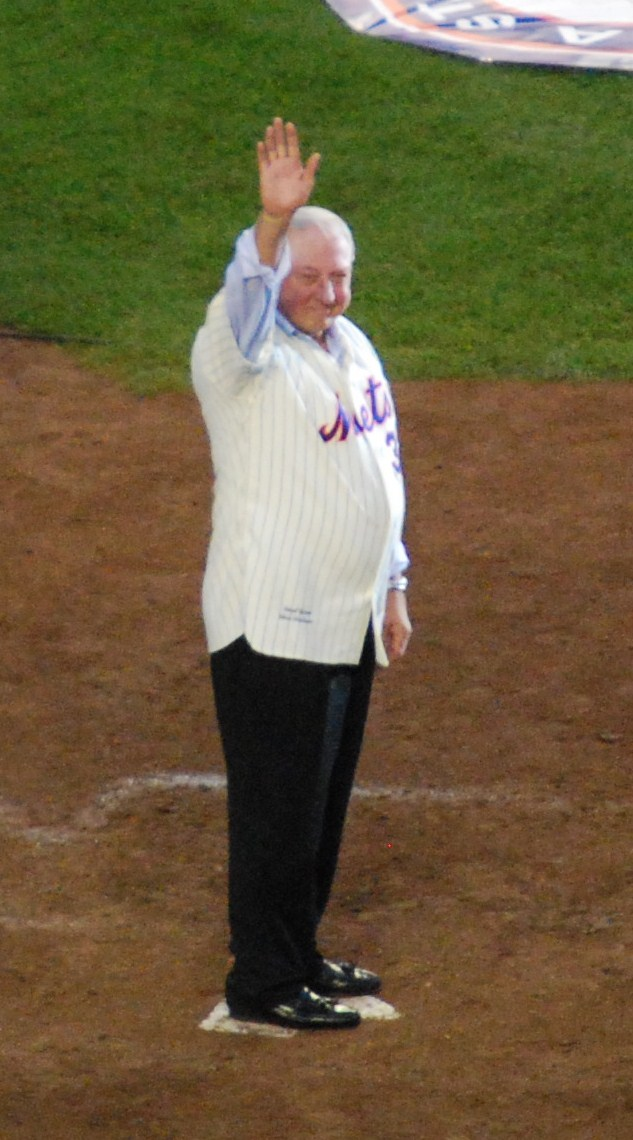
Koosman on September 28, 2008

Jerry Koosman's number 36 was retired by the New York Mets in 2021.

Koosman rebounded in 1979 to post a 20–13 record, and went 16–13 in 1980. On August 30, 1981, less than a month after the 1981 players' strike ended, the Twins traded Koosman to the Chicago White Sox. He went 4–13 on the season, again finishing tied for his league lead in losses.

He posted identical 11–7 records in 1982 and 1983. In the latter year, the White Sox won the American League West title to make their first post-season appearance since the 1959 World Series; however, the Baltimore Orioles defeated the White Sox in four games. After the season Koosman was traded to the Philadelphia Phillies; he went 14–15 in 1984 his last productive season.

On April 13, 1984, Koosman gave up a double to Pete Rose for his 4000th hit.

He ended his career with a 222–209 record and a 3.36 ERA in 612 games. He struck out 2,556 batters in 3,839 1/3 innings pitched. He is tied (with Tim Hudson) at No. 79 on the all-time win list and No. 35 on the all-time strikeout list.

Koosman has the third most wins in Mets history (140) behind Tom Seaver (198) and Dwight Gooden (157).

He was inducted into the New York Mets Hall of Fame in 1989. He attended the 40th anniversary reunion of the 1969 Miracle Mets at Citi Field on August 22, 2009.

The Mets retired Koosman's number 36 on August 28, 2021, making him the third Mets player (after Tom Seaver and Mike Piazza) to have his number retired. Koosman has since been joined by Keith Hernandez, Willie Mays, Dwight Gooden, Darryl Strawberry, David Wright and Carlos Beltrán in having their numbers retired.

== Later life and federal tax conviction ==
Following his playing days, Koosman worked as a minor league pitching instructor for the Mets in the early 1990s and then ran a business that designed machinery.

In May 2009, Koosman pleaded guilty to misdemeanor federal tax evasion after failing to pay up to $90,000 in federal income taxes for 2002, 2003, and 2004. Koosman admitted to being "suckered" by anti-tax rhetoric. On September 3, 2009, he was sentenced to six months in prison. He was released from Federal Prison Camp, Duluth on June 30, 2010.

== Death ==
Koosman died from heart failure complicated by multiple illnesses, at his home in Osceola, Wisconsin, on November 1, 2026, at the age of 83.

== See also ==
- List of Major League Baseball career wins leaders
- List of Major League Baseball career strikeout leaders

Sporting positions
Preceded by Ken Henderson	MLB Player of the Month; April 1973	Succeeded by Willie Crawford
Preceded by Joe Decker (15)	Minnesota Twins Single-Game Strikeout Total Record Holder (15); 1980	Succeeded by Bert Blyleven (15)
