= 1969 Philadelphia Phillies season =

Major League Baseball season

1969 Philadelphia Phillies
- League: National League
- Division: East
- Ballpark: Connie Mack Stadium
- City: Philadelphia
- Owners: R. R. M. Carpenter, Jr.
- General managers: John J. Quinn
- Managers: Bob Skinner, George Myatt
- Television: WFIL
- Radio: WCAU (By Saam, Bill Campbell, Richie Ashburn)

The 1969 Philadelphia Phillies season was the 87th season in the history of the franchise, and the 32nd season for the Philadelphia Phillies at Connie Mack Stadium. The team finished fifth in the newly established National League East with a record of 63–99, thirty-seven games behind the division champion New York Mets, which went on to defeat Baltimore, four games to one, in the World Series.

It was also the Phillies' penultimate season at Connie Mack Stadium. The franchise was scheduled to move into Veterans Stadium for 1970, but lengthy construction delays caused by poor weather and labor strikes forced the Phillies to return to the corner 21st and Lehigh Avenue for one more season.

== Offseason ==
- October 14, 1968: 1968 MLB expansion draft
  - Larry Jackson was drafted from the Phillies by the Montreal Expos as the 23rd pick. Jackson retired rather than report to the Expos. Bobby Wine was sent to the Expos as compensation on April 7, 1969.
  - Tony González was drafted from the Phillies by the San Diego Padres as the 37th pick.
- December 2, 1968: Billy Cowan was drafted from the Phillies by the New York Yankees in the 1968 rule 5 draft.
- January 20, 1969: Clay Dalrymple was traded by the Phillies to the Baltimore Orioles for Ron Stone.

== Regular season ==
1969 was a year of transition for the organization. Dick Allen was suspended by the team for a month after missing a game against the New York Mets. Claiming that Allen was undermining him by going directly to owner R. R. M. Carpenter, Jr., manager Bob Skinner surprised the club by resigning on August 6. Skinner blasted the club for their handling of Allen and blamed Allen for the team's losing saying, "Allen has been a big factor in our losing and there is very definitely disharmony on the club." Skinner was replaced by coach George Myatt. Allen was then traded from the club after the season.

In addition to the turmoil in the clubhouse, the Phillies had expected that 1969 would be their final season at Connie Mack Stadium with an April 1970 opening planned for Veterans Stadium. Construction delays pushed the Vet's opening to April 1971.

At Connie Mack Stadium on April 17, 1969, Montreal Expos pitcher Bill Stoneman threw a no-hitter against the Phillies. It was Stoneman's fifth major league start and only the ninth game of the Expos' existence.

In conjunction with Major League Baseball's celebration in 1969 of the 100th anniversary of professional baseball, the Phillies conducted a fan vote to determine their all-time team. The players were honored on August 5, 1969, at Connie Mack Stadium before the Phillies' game against the San Francisco Giants. Commissioner Bowie Kuhn was on hand to recognize Robin Roberts as the Phillies' greatest player of all time.

The Phillies recorded four straight complete-game shutouts from August 13 to 16, 1969. The Phillies shutout the Atlanta Braves two games in a row in Atlanta then returned to Philadelphia, where they shut out the Houston Astros in the following two games.

=== Season standings ===
NL East
Team	W	L	Pct.	GB	Home	Road
New York Mets	100	62	.617	—	52‍–‍30	48‍–‍32
Chicago Cubs	92	70	.568	8	49‍–‍32	43‍–‍38
Pittsburgh Pirates	88	74	.543	12	47‍–‍34	41‍–‍40
St. Louis Cardinals	87	75	.537	13	42‍–‍38	45‍–‍37
Philadelphia Phillies	63	99	.389	37	30‍–‍51	33‍–‍48
Montreal Expos	52	110	.321	48	24‍–‍57	28‍–‍53

=== Record vs. opponents ===
1969 National League record Sources:
Team	ATL	CHC	CIN	HOU	LAD	MON	NYM	PHI	PIT	SD	SF	STL
Atlanta	—	3–9	12–6	15–3	9–9	8–4	4–8	6–6	8–4	13–5	9–9	6–6
Chicago	9–3	—	6–6–1	8–4	6–6	10–8	8–10	12–6	7–11	11–1	6–6	9–9
Cincinnati	6–12	6–6–1	—	9–9	10–8	8–4	6–6	10–2	5–7	11–7	10–8	8–4
Houston	3–15	4–8	9–9	—	6–12	11–1	10–2	8–4	3–9	10–8	10–8	7–5
Los Angeles	9–9	6–6	8–10	12–6	—	10–2	4–8	8–4	8–4	12–6	5–13	3–9
Montreal	4–8	8–10	4–8	1–11	2–10	—	5–13	11–7	5–13	4–8	1–11	7–11
New York	8–4	10–8	6–6	2–10	8–4	13–5	—	12–6	10–8	11–1	8–4	12–6
Philadelphia	6-6	6–12	2–10	4–8	4–8	7–11	6–12	—	10–8	8–4	3–9	7–11
Pittsburgh	4–8	11–7	7–5	9–3	4–8	13–5	8–10	8–10	—	10–2	5–7	9–9
San Diego	5–13	1–11	7–11	8–10	6–12	8–4	1–11	4–8	2–10	—	6–12	4–8
San Francisco	9–9	6–6	8–10	8–10	13–5	11–1	4–8	9–3	7–5	12–6	—	3–9
St. Louis	6–6	9–9	4–8	5–7	9–3	11–7	6–12	11–7	9–9	8–4	9–3	—

=== Notable transactions ===
- June 5, 1969: Bob Boone was drafted by the Phillies in the 6th round of the 1969 Major League Baseball draft. Player signed June 11, 1969.

=== Game log ===
Legend
	Phillies win
	Phillies loss
	Postponement
**Bold**	Phillies team member

1969 Game Log
Overall Record: 63–99
April (8–11)

#	Date	Opponent	Score	Win	Loss	Save	Attendance	Record
1	April 8	@ Cubs	6–7 (11)	Phil Regan (1–0)	**Barry Lersch** (0–1)	None	40,796	0–1
2	April 9	@ Cubs	3–11	Bill Hands (1–0)	**Rick Wise** (0–1)	None	6,297	0–2
3	April 10	@ Cubs	2–6	Ken Holtzman (1–0)	**Woodie Fryman** (0–1)	None	5,422	0–3
4	April 11	@ Pirates	1–7	Bob Moose (1–0)	**Jerry Johnson** (0–1)	None	31,641	0–4
5	April 12	@ Pirates	8–1	**Grant Jackson** (1–0)	Jim Bunning (0–1)	None	12,474	1–4
6	April 13	@ Pirates	5–6	Ron Kline (1–0)	**Bill Wilson** (0–1)	None	14,981	1–5
7	April 14	Mets	5–1	**Woodie Fryman** (1–1)	Jim McAndrew (0–1)	None	13,070	2–5
8	April 15	Mets	3–6	Gary Gentry (2–0)	**Gary Wagner** (0–1)	Cal Koonce (2)	2,880	2–6
–	April 16	Expos	Postponed (rain); Makeup: July 4 as a traditional double-header					
9	April 17	Expos	0–7	Bill Stoneman (1–2)	**Jerry Johnson** (0–2)	None	6,496	2–7
–	April 18	Pirates	Postponed (rain); Makeup: September 15 as a traditional double-header					
10	April 19	Pirates	6–8	Steve Blass (1–0)	**Grant Jackson** (1–1)	Bruce Dal Canton (1)	3,953	2–8
11	April 20	Pirates	7–1	**Rick Wise** (1–1)	Bob Veale (1–2)	**Barry Lersch** (1)	4,930	3–8
12	April 21	@ Mets	2–1 (11)	**Woodie Fryman** (2–1)	Ron Taylor (0–1)	**Barry Lersch** (2)	9,286	4–8
–	April 22	@ Mets	Postponed (wet grounds and rain); Makeup: September 5 as a traditional double-header					
–	April 23	@ Expos	Postponed (rain); Makeup: September 19 as a traditional double-header					
13	April 24	@ Expos	7–1	**Rick Wise** (2–1)	Mudcat Grant (1–1)	None	5,116	5–8
14	April 25	Cardinals	5–1	**Grant Jackson** (2–1)	Bob Gibson (1–2)	None	7,710	6–8
15	April 26	Cardinals	4–10	Ron Willis (1–0)	**Barry Lersch** (0–2)	Joe Hoerner (3)	8,942	6–9
16	April 27	Cardinals	1–0	**Jerry Johnson** (1–2)	Ray Washburn (2–2)	None	7,565	7–9
17	April 28	Cubs	1–2 (10)	Ted Abernathy (2–0)	**Rick Wise** (2–2)	None	4,438	7–10
18	April 29	Cubs	0–10	Ferguson Jenkins (4–1)	**Grant Jackson** (2–2)	None	3,811	7–11
19	April 30	Cubs	3–1	**Woodie Fryman** (3–1)	Bill Hands (3–2)	None	2,930	8–11

May (10–13)

#	Date	Opponent	Score	Win	Loss	Save	Attendance	Record
20	May 2	@ Cardinals	7–2	**Jerry Johnson** (2–2)	Ray Washburn (2–3)	**Turk Farrell** (1)	17,916	9–11
21	May 3	@ Cardinals	4–1	**Rick Wise** (3–2)	Steve Carlton (2–3)	None	16,796	10–11
22	May 4	@ Cardinals	5–0	**Grant Jackson** (3–2)	Dave Giusti (2–3)	None	15,511	11–11
23	May 6	Astros	5–4	**Turk Farrell** (1–0)	Dooley Womack (1–1)	None	3,544	12–11
24	May 7	Astros	1–6	Larry Dierker (4–3)	**Jerry Johnson** (2–3)	None	3,001	12–12
25	May 8	Astros	7–9	Jack Billingham (2–2)	**Gary Wagner** (0–2)	Fred Gladding (4)	2,113	12–13
–	May 9	Braves	Postponed (rain); Makeup: July 29 as a traditional double-header					
26	May 10	Braves	3–6	Pat Jarvis (2–2)	**Grant Jackson** (3–3)	Cecil Upshaw (7)	7,313	12–14
27	May 11	Braves	3–4	Phil Niekro (6–1)	**Turk Farrell** (1–1)	None	4,105	12–15
28	May 13	Reds	4–6	Clay Carroll (2–3)	**Turk Farrell** (1–2)	George Culver (1)	4,474	12–16
29	May 14	Reds	2–4	Jim Merritt (3–2)	**Grant Jackson** (3–4)	George Culver (2)	4,532	12–17
30	May 15	Reds	7–0	**Rick Wise** (4–2)	Tony Cloninger (1–5)	None	3,294	13–17
31	May 16	Giants	3–1	**Woodie Fryman** (4–1)	Mike McCormick (1–1)	None	12,587	14–17
32	May 17	Giants	0–5	Gaylord Perry (6–3)	**Gary Wagner** (0–3)	None	12,514	14–18
33	May 18	Giants	9–8	**Turk Farrell** (2–2)	Bobby Bolin (2–3)	None	17,534	15–18
34	May 20	@ Reds	0–4	Tony Cloninger (2–5)	**Rick Wise** (4–3)	None	4,191	15–19
35	May 21	@ Reds	5–6	Clay Carroll (3–3)	**Jerry Johnson** (2–4)	None	4,811	15–20
36	May 23	@ Braves	6–2	**Grant Jackson** (4–4)	Milt Pappas (3–3)	None	14,868	16–20
37	May 24	@ Braves	8–3	**Rick Wise** (5–3)	Ron Reed (5–2)	**Bill Wilson** (1)	20,610	17–20
38	May 25	@ Braves	1–4	George Stone (5–0)	**Jerry Johnson** (2–5)	Cecil Upshaw (10)	35,172	17–21
39	May 27	@ Astros	2–6	Don Wilson (5–4)	**Bill Wilson** (0–2)	None	13,188	17–22
40	May 28	@ Astros	6–7 (10)	Jim Ray (2–0)	**Barry Lersch** (0–3)	None	17,298	17–23
41	May 30	Dodgers	13–6	**Woodie Fryman** (5–1)	Alan Foster (0–3)	**Al Raffo** (1)	10,737	18–23
42	May 31	Dodgers	6–7	Bill Singer (7–4)	**Grant Jackson** (4–5)	Jim Brewer (5)	11,345	18–24

June (15–15)

#	Date	Opponent	Score	Win	Loss	Save	Attendance	Record
43	June 1	Dodgers	4–12	Don Sutton (7–4)	**Rick Wise** (5–4)	Al McBean (3)	11,713	18–25
44	June 2	Padres	4–6	Al Santorini (3–2)	**Jerry Johnson** (2–6)	Gary Ross (1)	3,292	18–26
45	June 3	Padres	5–6	Clay Kirby (2–6)	**Woodie Fryman** (5–2)	Billy McCool (2)	3,646	18–27
46	June 4	Padres	0–3	Dick Kelley (3–4)	**Bill Champion** (0–1)	Billy McCool (3)	3,428	18–28
47	June 6	@ Giants	0–4	Gaylord Perry (8–5)	**Rick Wise** (5–5)	None	6,355	18–29
48	June 7	@ Giants	1–3	Juan Marichal (6–2)	**Grant Jackson** (4–6)	None	7,522	18–30
49	June 8	@ Giants	8–9 (12)	Frank Linzy (3–2)	**Al Raffo** (0–1)	None	9,055	18–31
50	June 10	@ Dodgers	1–2	Don Sutton (9–4)	**Woodie Fryman** (5–3)	None	13,166	18–32
51	June 11	@ Dodgers	3–0	**Bill Champion** (1–1)	Claude Osteen (8–5)	None	13,249	19–32
52	June 12	@ Dodgers	1–0	**Grant Jackson** (5–6)	Bill Singer (7–6)	None	13,846	20–32
53	June 13	@ Padres	6–1	**Rick Wise** (6–5)	Johnny Podres (5–5)	None	5,018	21–32
54	June 14	@ Padres	7–5	**Jerry Johnson** (3–6)	Al Santorini (3–4)	**Turk Farrell** (2)	6,127	22–32
55	June 15	@ Padres	5–4 (10)	**Woodie Fryman** (6–3)	Clay Kirby (2–7)	**John Boozer** (1)	7,311	23–32
56	June 17 (1)	Mets	0–1	Gary Gentry (6–5)	**Bill Champion** (1–2)	None	see 2nd game	23–33
57	June 17 (2)	Mets	7–3	**Grant Jackson** (6–6)	Don Cardwell (2–7)	None	17,259	24–33
58	June 18	Mets	0–2	Jerry Koosman (4–4)	**Rick Wise** (6–6)	None	5,608	24–34
59	June 19	Mets	5–6	Ron Taylor (3–1)	**Al Raffo** (0–2)	Tug McGraw (4)	6,871	24–35
60	June 20	Pirates	8–7	**Bill Wilson** (1–2)	Lou Marone (0–1)	**John Boozer** (2)	10,669	25–35
61	June 21	Pirates	2–8	Bruce Dal Canton (5–0)	**Lowell Palmer** (0–1)	None	5,469	25–36
62	June 22 (1)	Pirates	0–6	Dock Ellis (4–7)	**Bill Champion** (1–3)	None	see 2nd game	25–37
63	June 22 (2)	Pirates	3–2	**Grant Jackson** (7–6)	Steve Blass (7–4)	None	33,712	26–37
64	June 24 (1)	@ Mets	1–2	Tom Seaver (11–3)	**Woodie Fryman** (6–4)	None	see 2nd game	26–38
65	June 24 (2)	@ Mets	0–5	Jim McAndrew (1–2)	**Jerry Johnson** (3–7)	Ron Taylor (6)	39,843	26–39
66	June 25	@ Mets	6–5 (10)	**Bill Wilson** (2–2)	Ron Taylor (3–2)	**John Boozer** (3)	27,814	27–39
67	June 26	@ Mets	2–0	**Grant Jackson** (8–6)	Don Cardwell (2–8)	None	15,360	28–39
68	June 27	@ Expos	8–7	**Bill Champion** (2–3)	Steve Renko (0–1)	**Bill Wilson** (2)	16,847	29–39
69	June 28	@ Expos	13–8	**Turk Farrell** (3–2)	Bill Stoneman (4–10)	**John Boozer** (4)	11,150	30–39
70	June 29 (1)	@ Expos	2–0	**Lowell Palmer** (1–1)	Jerry Robertson (1–6)	None	see 2nd game	31–39
71	June 29 (2)	@ Expos	5–1	**Jerry Johnson** (4–7)	Mike Wegener (3–5)	None	27,169	32–39
72	June 30	@ Pirates	4–2	**Woodie Fryman** (7–4)	Dock Ellis (4–8)	**John Boozer** (5)	17,954	33–39

July (9–21)

#	Date	Opponent	Score	Win	Loss	Save	Attendance	Record
73	July 1	@ Pirates	7–4	**Grant Jackson** (9–6)	Steve Blass (8–5)	**Bill Wilson** (3)	6,652	34–39
74	July 2	@ Pirates	14–4	**Al Raffo** (1–2)	Jim Bunning (7–6)	**John Boozer** (6)	6,322	35–39
75	July 4 (1)	Expos	5–8	Jerry Robertson (2–6)	**Lowell Palmer** (1–2)	None	see 2nd game	35–40
76	July 4 (2)	Expos	3–7	Howie Reed (4–1)	**Jerry Johnson** (4–8)	Gary Waslewski (2)	21,521	35–41
77	July 5	Expos	4–6	Dan McGinn (4–7)	**Woodie Fryman** (7–5)	Dick Radatz (1)	3,496	35–42
78	July 6 (1)	Expos	13–2	**Bill Champion** (3–3)	Bill Stoneman (4–12)	None	see 2nd game	36–42
79	July 6 (2)	Expos	0–5	Gary Waslewski (1–2)	**Grant Jackson** (9–7)	None	8,664	36–43
–	July 7	Cardinals	Postponed (rain); Makeup: July 9 as a traditional double-header					
80	July 8	Cardinals	3–6	Bob Gibson (11–6)	**Jerry Johnson** (4–9)	None	8,522	36–44
81	July 9 (1)	Cardinals	7–1	**Woodie Fryman** (8–5)	Nelson Briles (7–8)	None	see 2nd game	37–44
82	July 9 (2)	Cardinals	3–5	Nelson Briles (8–8)	**Lowell Palmer** (1–3)	Joe Hoerner (10)	13,919	37–45
83	July 10	Cardinals	3–9	Mike Torrez (3–4)	**Grant Jackson** (9–8)	Mudcat Grant (1)	3,888	37–46
84	July 11	@ Cubs	7–5	**John Boozer** (1–0)	Ted Abernathy (4–2)	**Bill Wilson** (4)	24,509	38–46
85	July 12	@ Cubs	4–7	Ferguson Jenkins (12–6)	**Rick Wise** (6–7)	Phil Regan (8)	26,732	38–47
86	July 13 (1)	@ Cubs	0–6	Ken Holtzman (11–5)	**Woodie Fryman** (8–6)	None	see 2nd game	38–48
87	July 13 (2)	@ Cubs	4–6	Jim Colborn (1–0)	**Lowell Palmer** (1–4)	Rich Nye (2)	34,913	38–49
88	July 15	@ Cardinals	2–8	Chuck Taylor (2–0)	**Grant Jackson** (9–9)	None	21,846	38–50
89	July 16	@ Cardinals	0–5	Steve Carlton (12–5)	**Bill Champion** (3–4)	None	24,737	38–51
90	July 17	@ Cardinals	3–11	Mike Torrez (4–4)	**Rick Wise** (6–8)	Ray Washburn (1)	17,814	38–52
91	July 18	Cubs	5–9	Phil Regan (10–5)	**Bill Wilson** (2–3)	None	16,751	38–53
92	July 19	Cubs	5–3	**Rick Wise** (7–8)	Bill Hands (11–8)	None	4,801	39–53
93	July 20 (1)	Cubs	0–1	Ferguson Jenkins (13–7)	**Grant Jackson** (9–10)	None	see 2nd game	39–54
94	July 20 (2)	Cubs	1–6	Dick Selma (10–4)	**Bill Champion** (3–5)	None	12,393	39–55
–	July 22	All-Star Game	Postponed (rain); Makeup: July 23					
–	July 23	**1969 Major League Baseball All-Star Game at Robert F. Kennedy Memorial Stadium in Washington**						
95	July 24	@ Astros	3–7	Don Wilson (11–7)	**Rick Wise** (7–9)	None	19,046	39–56
96	July 25	@ Astros	7–3	**Grant Jackson** (10–10)	Larry Dierker (12–8)	None	18,285	40–56
97	July 26	@ Astros	2–4	Tom Griffin (6–4)	**Lowell Palmer** (1–5)	Fred Gladding (19)	26,962	40–57
98	July 27	@ Astros	2–3 (11)	Fred Gladding (2–3)	**Bill Wilson** (2–4)	None	21,183	40–58
–	July 29 (1)	Braves	Postponed (rain); Makeup: July 30 as a traditional double-header					
–	July 29 (2)	Braves	Postponed (rain); Makeup: July 31 as a traditional double-header					
99	July 30 (1)	Braves	3–6	Milt Pappas (5–8)	**Grant Jackson** (10–11)	Cecil Upshaw (20)	see 2nd game	40–59
100	July 30 (2)	Braves	4–3	**Bill Champion** (4–5)	George Stone (9–6)	**Bill Wilson** (5)	9,391	41–59
101	July 31 (1)	Braves	2–4	Pat Jarvis (9–7)	**Lowell Palmer** (1–6)	Claude Raymond (1)	see 2nd game	41–60
102	July 31 (2)	Braves	9–0	**Rick Wise** (8–9)	Jim Britton (5–2)	None	8,507	42–60

August (10–18)

#	Date	Opponent	Score	Win	Loss	Save	Attendance	Record
103	August 1	Reds	6–7	Tony Cloninger (8–13)	**Woodie Fryman** (8–7)	Wayne Granger (14)	7,412	42–61
104	August 2	Reds	5–3	**Grant Jackson** (11–11)	Jim Merritt (10–5)	**Bill Wilson** (6)	8,615	43–61
105	August 3	Reds	17–19	Wayne Granger (5–4)	**Turk Farrell** (3–3)	None	13,181	43–62
–	August 4	Giants	Postponed (rain); Makeup: August 5 as a traditional double-header					
106	August 5 (1)	Giants	2–6	Mike McCormick (8–5)	**John Boozer** (1–1)	None	see 2nd game	43–63
107	August 5 (2)	Giants	3–5	Bobby Bolin (6–7)	**Woodie Fryman** (8–8)	Frank Linzy (9)	8,712	43–64
108	August 6	Giants	5–4	**Rick Wise** (9–9)	Juan Marichal (13–8)	**Bill Champion** (1)	8,586	44–64
109	August 8	@ Reds	5–12	Jack Fisher (3–2)	**Bill Wilson** (2–5)	None	15,263	44–65
110	August 9	@ Reds	2–4 (12)	Wayne Granger (6–4)	**Al Raffo** (1–3)	None	19,239	44–66
111	August 10	@ Reds	0–10	Gary Nolan (3–3)	**Woodie Fryman** (8–9)	None	16,589	44–67
112	August 11	@ Reds	3–4	Jim Merritt (12–5)	**Rick Wise** (9–10)	Wayne Granger (16)	12,709	44–68
–	August 12	@ Braves	Postponed (rain); Makeup: August 13 as a traditional double-header					
113	August 13 (1)	@ Braves	2–4	Milt Pappas (6–9)	**John Boozer** (1–2)	Cecil Upshaw (22)	see 2nd game	44–69
114	August 13 (2)	@ Braves	7–0	**Jerry Johnson** (5–9)	Pat Jarvis (10–8)	None	11,957	45–69
115	August 14	@ Braves	6–0	**Woodie Fryman** (9–9)	Phil Niekro (16–10)	None	9,832	46–69
116	August 15	Astros	1–0	**Grant Jackson** (12–11)	Denny Lemaster (9–12)	None	6,183	47–69
117	August 16	Astros	7–0	**Rick Wise** (10–10)	Tom Griffin (8–6)	None	3,113	48–69
118	August 17	Astros	2–3	Larry Dierker (15–9)	**Bill Champion** (4–6)	Fred Gladding (26)	4,795	48–70
119	August 19	Dodgers	0–2	Jim Bunning (11–9)	**Woodie Fryman** (9–10)	Jim Brewer (18)	7,850	48–71
120	August 20	Dodgers	5–8	Pete Mikkelsen (5–3)	**Grant Jackson** (12–12)	Al McBean (4)	8,232	48–72
121	August 21	Dodgers	2–1	**Jerry Johnson** (6–9)	Claude Osteen (16–11)	None	8,357	49–72
122	August 22	Padres	10–0	**Rick Wise** (11–10)	Clay Kirby (3–17)	None	3,824	50–72
123	August 23	Padres	7–6	**Lowell Palmer** (2–6)	Frank Reberger (1–2)	**Turk Farrell** (3)	4,669	51–72
124	August 24	Padres	6–4	**Woodie Fryman** (10–10)	Tommie Sisk (0–8)	None	4,761	52–72
125	August 26	@ Giants	4–13	Gaylord Perry (16–10)	**Jerry Johnson** (6–10)	None	5,208	52–73
126	August 27	@ Giants	7–8 (10)	Frank Linzy (11–6)	**Turk Farrell** (3–4)	None	4,973	52–74
127	August 28	@ Giants	3–4	Frank Linzy (12–6)	**Bill Champion** (4–7)	None	5,555	52–75
128	August 29	@ Dodgers	5–6	Pete Mikkelsen (6–3)	**Woodie Fryman** (10–11)	Ray Lamb (1)	19,512	52–76
129	August 30	@ Dodgers	0–2	Claude Osteen (18–11)	**Jerry Johnson** (6–11)	Pete Mikkelsen (3)	35,753	52–77
130	August 31	@ Dodgers	1–4	Bill Singer (17–8)	**Rick Wise** (11–11)	None	19,357	52–78

September (11–19)

#	Date	Opponent	Score	Win	Loss	Save	Attendance	Record
131	September 1	@ Padres	2–5	Clay Kirby (4–18)	**Grant Jackson** (12–13)	Gary Ross (3)	2,703	52–79
132	September 2	@ Padres	2–0	**Bill Champion** (5–7)	Tommie Sisk (0–10)	None	3,729	53–79
133	September 3	@ Padres	9–1	**Woodie Fryman** (11–11)	Al Santorini (6–13)	None	6,300	54–79
134	September 5 (1)	@ Mets	1–5	Tom Seaver (20–7)	**Grant Jackson** (12–14)	None	see 2nd game	54–80
135	September 5 (2)	@ Mets	4–2	**Rick Wise** (12–11)	Jim McAndrew (6–6)	None	40,450	55–80
136	September 6	@ Mets	0–3	Don Cardwell (6–9)	**Jerry Johnson** (6–12)	Tug McGraw (11)	20,477	55–81
137	September 7	@ Mets	3–9	Nolan Ryan (5–1)	**Bill Champion** (5–8)	None	28,937	55–82
138	September 8	Cardinals	3–4	Chuck Taylor (7–2)	**Woodie Fryman** (11–12)	Mudcat Grant (4)	2,025	55–83
139	September 9	Cardinals	2–6	Nelson Briles (15–12)	**Grant Jackson** (12–15)	Mudcat Grant (5)	2,547	55–84
140	September 10	Cubs	6–2	**Rick Wise** (13–11)	Ken Holtzman (16–10)	None	4,164	56–84
141	September 11	Cubs	4–3	**Jeff James** (1–0)	Dick Selma (12–7)	**Grant Jackson** (1)	4,255	57–84
142	September 12	Expos	0–4	Bill Stoneman (10–17)	**Bill Champion** (5–9)	None	2,739	57–85
143	September 13	Expos	5–7	Dan McGinn (6–10)	**Woodie Fryman** (11–13)	Jerry Robertson (1)	3,154	57–86
144	September 14	Expos	2–7	Steve Renko (5–6)	**Grant Jackson** (12–16)	Claude Raymond (2)	3,327	57–87
145	September 15 (1)	Pirates	2–1	**Rick Wise** (14–11)	Bob Veale (12–12)	None	see 2nd game	58–87
146	September 15 (2)	Pirates	4–3	**Jeff James** (2–0)	Bo Belinsky (0–3)	None	2,933	59–87
147	September 16	Pirates	5–9	Bob Moose (11–3)	**Woodie Fryman** (11–14)	Joe Gibbon (10)	1,169	59–88
148	September 17	@ Cubs	7–9	Ferguson Jenkins (20–14)	**Bill Champion** (5–10)	Rich Nye (3)	6,062	59–89
149	September 18	@ Cubs	5–3	**Grant Jackson** (13–16)	Phil Regan (12–6)	None	5,796	60–89
150	September 19 (1)	@ Expos	6–10	Gary Waslewski (3–9)	**Rick Wise** (14–12)	Howie Reed (1)	see 2nd game	60–90
151	September 19 (2)	@ Expos	1–3	Steve Renko (6–6)	**Jeff James** (2–1)	None	17,083	60–91
152	September 20	@ Expos	6–4	**Woodie Fryman** (12–14)	Mike Wegener (5–13)	None	12,624	61–91
153	September 21	@ Expos	6–7	Dan McGinn (7–10)	**Lowell Palmer** (2–7)	None	15,822	61–92
154	September 23	@ Pirates	4–3	**Grant Jackson** (14–16)	Bob Veale (13–13)	**Jerry Johnson** (1)	2,364	62–92
–	September 24	@ Pirates	Postponed (rain); Makeup: September 25 as a traditional double-header					
155	September 25 (1)	@ Pirates	3–5	Luke Walker (4–6)	**Rick Wise** (14–13)	None	see 2nd game	62–93
156	September 25 (2)	@ Pirates	7–9	Bob Moose (13–3)	**Jeff James** (2–2)	Joe Gibbon (11)	2,379	62–94
157	September 26	Mets	0–5	Jerry Koosman (17–9)	**Woodie Fryman** (12–15)	None	6,288	62–95
158	September 27	Mets	0–1	Tom Seaver (25–7)	**Grant Jackson** (14–17)	None	4,297	62–96
159	September 28	Mets	0–2	Gary Gentry (13–12)	**Jerry Johnson** (6–13)	Ron Taylor (13)	6,875	62–97
160	September 30	@ Cardinals	4–3	**Rick Wise** (15–13)	Santiago Guzmán (0–1)	None	9,891	63–97

October (0–2)

#	Date	Opponent	Score	Win	Loss	Save	Attendance	Record
161	October 1	@ Cardinals	5–6	Joe Hoerner (2–3)	**Lowell Palmer** (2–8)	None	7,810	63–98
162	October 2	@ Cardinals	2–3 (12)	Bob Gibson (20–13)	**Grant Jackson** (14–18)	None	11,680	63–99

=== Roster ===
1969 Philadelphia Phillies
**Roster**
**Pitchers**: 28 John Boozer; 31 Bill Champion; 32 Turk Farrell; 22 Woodie Fryman; 29 Grant Jackson; 30 Jeff James; 33 Jerry Johnson; 34 Barry Lersch; 26 Lowell Palmer; 28 Luis Peraza; 25 Al Raffo; 41 Chris Short; 31 Gary Wagner; 24 Bill Wilson; 38 Rick Wise	**Catchers**: 7 Vic Roznovsky; 9 Mike Ryan; 2 Dave Watkins; **Infielders**: 15 Dick Allen; 19 Terry Harmon; 18 Rick Joseph; 5 Don Money; 16 Cookie Rojas; 10 Gene Stone; 8 Tony Taylor	**Outfielders**: 23 Rich Barry; 12 Johnny Briggs; 6 Johnny Callison; 4 Larry Hisle; 11 Deron Johnson; 23 Don Lock; 40 Scott Reid; 3 Ron Stone; **Other batters**: 23 Leroy Reams	**Manager**: 47 George Myatt; 1 Bob Skinner; **Coaches**: 46 Billy DeMars; 47 George Myatt; 48 Andy Seminick; 49 Al Widmar

== Player stats ==
=== Batting ===
==== Starters by position ====
Note: Pos = Position; G = Games played; AB = At bats; H = Hits; Avg. = Batting average; HR = Home runs; RBI = Runs batted in

Pos	Player	G	AB	H	Avg.	HR	RBI
C	Mike Ryan	133	446	91	.204	12	44
1B	Dick Allen	118	438	126	.288	32	89
2B	Cookie Rojas	110	391	89	.228	4	30
SS	Don Money	127	450	103	.229	6	42
3B	Tony Taylor	138	557	146	.262	3	30
LF	Deron Johnson	138	475	121	.255	17	80
CF	Larry Hisle	145	482	128	.266	20	56
RF	Johnny Callison	134	495	131	.265	16	64

==== Other batters ====
Note: G = Games played; AB = At bats; H = Hits; Avg. = Batting average; HR = Home runs; RBI = Runs batted in

Player	G	AB	H	Avg.	HR	RBI
Johnny Briggs	124	361	86	.238	12	46
Rick Joseph	99	264	72	.273	6	37
Ron Stone	103	222	53	.239	1	24
Terry Harmon	87	201	48	.239	0	16
Dave Watkins	69	148	26	.176	4	12
Rich Barry	20	32	6	.188	0	0
Gene Stone	18	28	6	.214	0	0
Scott Reid	13	19	4	.211	0	0
Vic Roznovsky	13	13	3	.231	0	1
Don Lock	4	4	0	.000	0	0
Leroy Reams	1	1	0	.000	0	0

=== Pitching ===
==== Starting pitchers ====
Note: G = Games pitched; IP = Innings pitched; W = Wins; L = Losses; ERA = Earned run average; SO = Strikeouts

Player	G	IP	W	L	ERA	SO
Grant Jackson	38	253.0	14	18	3.34	180
Woodie Fryman	36	228.1	12	15	4.41	150
Rick Wise	33	220.0	15	13	3.23	144
Bill Champion	23	116.2	5	10	5.01	70
Jeff James	6	31.2	2	2	5.40	21
Chris Short	2	10.0	0	0	7.20	5

==== Other pitchers ====
Note: G = Games pitched; IP = Innings pitched; W = Wins; L = Losses; ERA = Earned run average; SO = Strikeouts

Player	G	IP	W	L	ERA	SO
Jerry Johnson	33	147.1	6	13	4.28	82
Lowell Palmer	26	90.0	2	8	5.20	68
Gary Wagner	9	19.1	0	3	7.91	8

==== Relief pitchers ====
Note: G = Games pitched; W = Wins; L = Losses; SV = Saves; ERA = Earned run average; SO = Strikeouts

Player	G	W	L	SV	ERA	SO
John Boozer	46	1	2	6	4.28	47
Turk Farrell	46	3	4	3	4.00	40
Al Raffo	45	1	3	1	4.11	38
Bill Wilson	37	2	5	6	3.32	48
Barry Lersch	10	0	3	2	7.13	13
Luis Peraza	8	0	0	0	6.00	7

== Farm system ==
Level	Team	League	Manager
AAA	Eugene Emeralds	Pacific Coast League	Frank Lucchesi
AA	Reading Phillies	Eastern League	Bob Wellman
A	Raleigh-Durham Phillies	Carolina League	Nolan Campbell
A	Spartanburg Phillies	Western Carolinas League	Bobby Malkmus
A-Short Season	Walla Walla Bears	Northwest League	Howie Bedell
Rookie	Pulaski Phillies	Appalachian League	Dallas Green

LEAGUE CHAMPIONS: Raleigh-Durham, Pulaski
