= Al Raffo =

American baseball player (born 1941)

- Pitcher
- Born: November 27, 1941 (age 84); San Francisco, California, U.S.
- Batted: Right Threw: Right

MLB debut
- April 29, 1969, for the Philadelphia Phillies

Last MLB appearance
- September 26, 1969, for the Philadelphia Phillies

MLB statistics
- Win–loss record: 1–3
- Earned run average: 4.11
- Strikeouts: 38
- Stats at Baseball Reference

Teams
- Philadelphia Phillies (1969)

Albert Martin Raffo (born November 27, 1941) is an American former Major League Baseball (MLB) pitcher who played for the Philadelphia Phillies in the 1969 season.

Raffo attended Los Angeles High School and was signed by the Phillies as an amateur free agent in 1962. He progressed through their minor league system before receiving his call to the majors in late April 1969. Pitching 3 2/3 scoreless innings in relief of starting pitcher Woodie Fryman, Raffo surrendered only 1 hit and 1 walk en route to his only career save, the Phillies defeated the visiting Los Angeles Dodgers, 13–6, on May 30 at Connie Mack Stadium. On June 8, Raffo was called upon to pitch in the bottom of the 9th inning with the score tied 8–8 against the San Francisco Giants at Candlestick Park. After pitching 3 scoreless innings, he ran into difficulty in the bottom of the 12th. After a pair of lead walks followed by a single, he surrendered a game-winning single to Jim Davenport leading to his first MLB loss.

Raffo's second loss came off the bats of the New York Mets on June 19. Entering the game in the top of the 9th inning with the Phillies leading 5–4, he issued a walk and a single before being replaced by Turk Farrell. The runners eventually scored with Raffo being tagged for the 6–5 home loss. Raffo's lone MLB victory came on July 2 when he entered the game in the bottom of the 1st inning, relieving Bill Champion, who was having an ineffective start. Pitching 6 effective innings, he earned the victory in the Phillies' 14–4 win over the Pittsburgh Pirates at Forbes Field. The Cincinnati Reds handed Raffo his final loss. Called upon in the bottom of the 12th inning, he walked Ted Savage and issued a game-winning home run to Pete Rose in the 4–2 loss at Crosley Field on August 9. Raffo completed his professional baseball career in the Phillies' minor leagues during the 1970 and 1971 seasons. Following baseball, he earned his college degree and entered the teaching profession.
