= 1969 Atlanta Braves season =

1969 Atlanta Braves
- National League West champions
- League: National League
- Division: West
- Ballpark: Atlanta Stadium
- City: Atlanta
- Record: 93–69 (.574)
- Divisional place: 1st
- Owners: William Bartholomay
- General managers: Paul Richards
- Managers: Lum Harris
- Television: WSB-TV (Ernie Johnson, Milo Hamilton, Bob Uecker)
- Radio: WSB (Ernie Johnson, Milo Hamilton)

The 1969 Atlanta Braves season was the fourth in Atlanta and the 99th overall season of the franchise. The National League had been split into two divisions before the season, with the Braves somewhat incongruously being assigned to the National League West. The Braves finished with a record of 93–69, winning the first ever NL West title by three games over the San Francisco Giants.

After the season, the Braves played in the first inter-divisional National League Championship Series. They went on to lose the NLCS to the eventual World Champion New York Mets, three games to none.

== Offseason ==
=== The new National League ===
The 1969 season marked the first year of divisional play in Major League Baseball. The Braves (along with the Cincinnati Reds) were placed in the National League West division, despite being located further east than the two westernmost teams in the new National League East, the Chicago Cubs and St. Louis Cardinals. This was because the New York Mets wanted to be in the same division as the reigning power in the NL, which were the Cardinals at the time (to compensate for playing against the Dodgers and Giants fewer times each season). The Cubs consequently demanded to be in the NL East as well in order to continue playing in the same division as the Cardinals, one of the Cubs' biggest rivals. But the primary reason for this odd alignment was that the Cardinals, Giants, and Cubs finished 1-2-3 the previous two seasons and it was feared putting them all in the West would create too big of a disparity in strength between the West and East.

=== Notable transactions ===
- October 14, 1968: 1968 Major League Baseball expansion draft
  - Al Santorini was drafted from the Braves by the San Diego Padres with the 7th pick.
  - Skip Guinn was drafted from the Braves by the Montreal Expos with the 17th pick.
  - Carl Morton was drafted from the Braves by the Expos with the 45th pick.
  - Cito Gaston was drafted from the Braves by the Padres with the 59th pick.
- December 2, 1968: Darrell Evans was drafted by the Braves from the Oakland Athletics in the 1968 rule 5 draft.
- March 17, 1969: Joe Torre was traded by the Braves to the St. Louis Cardinals for Orlando Cepeda.

== Regular season ==
Second baseman Félix Millán started the All-Star Game, along with right fielder Hank Aaron, and won his first Gold Glove.

=== Season standings ===
NL West
Team	W	L	Pct.	GB	Home	Road
Atlanta Braves	93	69	.574	—	50‍–‍31	43‍–‍38
San Francisco Giants	90	72	.556	3	52‍–‍29	38‍–‍43
Cincinnati Reds	89	73	.549	4	50‍–‍31	39‍–‍42
Los Angeles Dodgers	85	77	.525	8	50‍–‍31	35‍–‍46
Houston Astros	81	81	.500	12	52‍–‍29	29‍–‍52
San Diego Padres	52	110	.321	41	28‍–‍53	24‍–‍57

=== Record vs. opponents ===
1969 National League record Sources:
Team	ATL	CHC	CIN	HOU	LAD	MON	NYM	PHI	PIT	SD	SF	STL
Atlanta	—	3–9	12–6	15–3	9–9	8–4	4–8	6–6	8–4	13–5	9–9	6–6
Chicago	9–3	—	6–6–1	8–4	6–6	10–8	8–10	12–6	7–11	11–1	6–6	9–9
Cincinnati	6–12	6–6–1	—	9–9	10–8	8–4	6–6	10–2	5–7	11–7	10–8	8–4
Houston	3–15	4–8	9–9	—	6–12	11–1	10–2	8–4	3–9	10–8	10–8	7–5
Los Angeles	9–9	6–6	8–10	12–6	—	10–2	4–8	8–4	8–4	12–6	5–13	3–9
Montreal	4–8	8–10	4–8	1–11	2–10	—	5–13	11–7	5–13	4–8	1–11	7–11
New York	8–4	10–8	6–6	2–10	8–4	13–5	—	12–6	10–8	11–1	8–4	12–6
Philadelphia	6-6	6–12	2–10	4–8	4–8	7–11	6–12	—	10–8	8–4	3–9	7–11
Pittsburgh	4–8	11–7	7–5	9–3	4–8	13–5	8–10	8–10	—	10–2	5–7	9–9
San Diego	5–13	1–11	7–11	8–10	6–12	8–4	1–11	4–8	2–10	—	6–12	4–8
San Francisco	9–9	6–6	8–10	8–10	13–5	11–1	4–8	9–3	7–5	12–6	—	3–9
St. Louis	6–6	9–9	4–8	5–7	9–3	11–7	6–12	11–7	9–9	8–4	9–3	—

=== Opening Day starters ===
- Hank Aaron
- Felipe Alou
- Clete Boyer
- Orlando Cepeda
- Tito Francona
- Sonny Jackson
- Pat Jarvis
- Félix Millán
- Bob Tillman

=== Notable transactions ===
- June 5, 1969: Larvell Blanks was drafted by the Braves in the 3rd round of the 1969 Major League Baseball draft.
- June 13, 1969: Van Kelly, Walt Hriniak and Andy Finlay (minors) were traded by the Braves to the San Diego Padres for Tony González.
- August 19, 1969: Claude Raymond was purchased from the Braves by the Montreal Expos.
- September 8, 1969: Mickey Rivers and Clint Compton were traded by the Braves to the California Angels for Hoyt Wilhelm and Bob Priddy.
- September 11, 1969: Chico Ruiz was signed as an amateur free agent by the Braves.

=== Roster ===
1969 Atlanta Braves
Roster
Pitchers: 42 Jim Britton; 45 Paul Doyle; 22 Garry Hill; 33 Pat Jarvis; 30 Ken Johnson; 37 Rick Kester; 23 Larry Maxie; 22 Mike McQueen; 31 Gary Neibauer; 35 Phil Niekro; 32 Milt Pappas; 37 Bob Priddy; 36 Claude Raymond; 38 Ron Reed; 40 George Stone; 34 Cecil Upshaw; 43 Charlie Vaughan; 39 Hoyt Wilhelm	Catchers: 4 Bob Didier; 39 Walt Hriniak; 10 Bob Tillman; Infielders: 18 Tommie Aaron; 6 Clete Boyer; 2 Jim Breazeale; 20,30 Orlando Cepeda; 2,11 Darrell Evans; 7 Gil Garrido; 16 Sonny Jackson; 17 Félix Millán	Outfielders: 44 Hank Aaron; 29 Felipe Alou; 14 Bob Aspromonte; 12 Dusty Baker; 36 Oscar Brown; 25 Rico Carty; 19 Tito Francona; 11,48 Ralph Garr; 43 Tony González; 28 Mike Lum	Manager: 26 Lum Harris; Coaches: 8 Jim Busby; 5 Harry Dorish; 9 Billy Goodman; 65 Satchel Paige; 3 Ken Silvestri

== Player stats ==
=== Batting ===
==== Starters by position ====
Note: Pos = Position; G = Games played; AB = At bats; H = Hits; Avg. = Batting average; HR = Home runs; RBI = Runs batted in

Pos	Player	G	AB	H	Avg.	HR	RBI
C	Bob Didier	114	352	90	.256	0	32
1B	Orlando Cepeda	154	573	147	.257	22	88
2B	Félix Millán	162	652	174	.267	6	57
3B	Clete Boyer	144	496	124	.250	14	57
SS	Sonny Jackson	98	318	76	.239	1	27
LF	Rico Carty	104	304	104	.342	16	58
CF	Felipe Alou	123	476	134	.282	5	32
RF	Hank Aaron	147	547	164	.300	44	97

==== Other batters ====
Note: G = Games played; AB = At bats; H = Hits; Avg. = Batting average; HR = Home runs; RBI = Runs batted in

Player	G	AB	H	Avg.	HR	RBI
Tony González	89	320	94	.294	10	50
Gil Garrido	82	227	50	.220	0	10
Bob Aspromonte	82	198	50	.253	3	24
Bob Tillman	69	190	37	.195	12	29
Mike Lum	121	168	45	.268	1	22
Tito Francona	51	88	26	.295	2	22
Tommie Aaron	49	60	15	.250	1	5
Ralph Garr	22	27	6	.222	0	2
Darrell Evans	12	26	6	.231	0	1
Walt Hriniak	7	7	1	.143	0	0
Dusty Baker	3	7	0	.000	0	0
Oscar Brown	7	4	1	.250	0	0
Jim Breazeale	2	1	0	.000	0	0

=== Pitching ===
==== Starting pitchers ====
Note: G = Games pitched; IP = Innings pitched; W = Wins; L = Losses; ERA = Earned run average; SO = Strikeouts

Player	G	IP	W	L	ERA	SO
Phil Niekro	40	284.1	23	13	2.56	193
Ron Reed	36	241.1	18	10	3.47	160
Pat Jarvis	37	217.1	13	11	4.43	123
Milt Pappas	26	144.0	6	10	3.62	72
Mike McQueen	1	3.0	0	0	3.00	3
Garry Hill	1	2.1	0	1	15.43	2

==== Other pitchers ====
Note: G = Games pitched; IP = Innings pitched; W = Wins; L = Losses; ERA = Earned run average; SO = Strikeouts

Player	G	IP	W	L	ERA	SO
George Stone	36	165.1	13	10	3.65	102
Jim Britton	24	88.0	7	5	3.78	60
Ken Johnson	9	29.0	0	1	4.97	20

==== Relief pitchers ====
Note: G = Games pitched; W = Wins; L = Losses; SV = Saves; ERA = Earned run average; SO = Strikeouts

Player	G	W	L	SV	ERA	SO
Cecil Upshaw	62	6	4	27	2.91	57
Paul Doyle	36	2	0	4	2.08	25
Claude Raymond	33	2	2	1	5.25	15
Gary Neibauer	29	1	2	0	3.90	42
Hoyt Wilhelm	8	2	0	4	0.73	14
Larry Maxie	2	0	0	0	3.00	1
Bob Priddy	1	0	0	0	0.00	1
Rick Kester	1	0	0	0	13.50	2
Charlie Vaughan	1	0	0	0	18.00	1

== Postseason ==
=== National League Championship Series ===
Game	Date	Visitor	Score	Home	Score	Record (NYM-ATL)	Attendance
1	October 4	New York	9	Atlanta	5	1–0	50,122
2	October 5	New York	11	Atlanta	6	2–0	50,270
3	October 6	Atlanta	4	New York	7	3–0	53,195
NYM won 3, ATL won 0. New York wins the National League Championship and advances to the World Series

== Awards and honors ==
- Rawlings Gold Glove Award
  - Félix Millán, second base
  - Clete Boyer, third base

=== All-Stars ===
1969 Major League Baseball All-Star Game

- Hank Aaron, OF, starter
- Félix Millán, 2B, starter
- Phil Niekro, reserve

== Farm system ==
Level	Team	League	Manager
AAA	Richmond Braves	International League	Mickey Vernon
AA	Shreveport Braves	Texas League	Lou Fitzgerald
A	Greenwood Braves	Western Carolinas League	Eddie Haas
Rookie	Magic Valley Cowboys	Pioneer League	Connie Ryan

LEAGUE CHAMPIONS: Greenwood
