= 1969 St. Louis Cardinals season =

Major League Baseball season

1969 St. Louis Cardinals
- League: National League
- Division: East
- Ballpark: Busch Memorial Stadium
- City: St. Louis, Missouri
- Record: 87–75 (.537)
- Divisional place: 4th
- Owners: August "Gussie" Busch
- General managers: Bing Devine
- Managers: Red Schoendienst
- Television: KSD-TV
- Radio: KMOX (Harry Caray, Jack Buck)

The 1969 St. Louis Cardinals season was the team's 88th season in St. Louis, Missouri and its 78th season in the National League. The Cardinals went 87–75 during the season and finished fourth in the newly established National League East, 13 games behind the eventual NL pennant and World Series champion New York Mets.

The resurgent Chicago Cubs, featuring players such as Ernie Banks, Ron Santo, and Billy Williams and helmed by fiery manager Leo Durocher, led the newly formed NL East for much of the summer before faltering. The Cardinals put on a mid-season surge, as their famous announcer Harry Caray (in what would prove to be his final season of 25 doing Cardinals broadcasts) began singing, "The Cardinals are coming, tra-la, tra-la". However, to the surprise of both Chicago and St. Louis, the Miracle Mets would ultimately win the division, as well as the league championship and the World Series.

== Offseason ==
- October 14, 1968: Coco Laboy was drafted from the Cardinals by the Montreal Expos as the 54th pick in the 1968 MLB expansion draft.
- December 2, 1968: 1968 rule 5 draft
  - Pedro Borbón was drafted from the Cardinals by the California Angels.
  - Bo Belinsky was drafted by the Cardinals from the Houston Astros.
- February 12, 1969: Byron Browne was purchased by the Cardinals from the Houston Astros.
- March 17, 1969: Orlando Cepeda was traded by the Cardinals to the Atlanta Braves for Joe Torre.
- March 29, 1969: Dennis Ribant was purchased by the Cardinals from the Kansas City Royals.
- Prior to 1969 season: Tommy Cruz was signed by the Cardinals as an amateur free agent.

== Regular season ==
Pitcher Bob Gibson and outfielder Curt Flood won Gold Gloves this year.

1969 also marked the final season for the Busch Stadium grass before the installation of AstroTurf, which would be their home surface for the next 26 seasons.

After the season, long-time broadcaster Harry Caray's contract was not renewed. At a news conference shortly afterward, Caray pointedly and conspicuously drank from a can of Schlitz beer, at the time the main competitor to the brands of Anheuser-Busch (A–B), who owned the Cardinals. He said he did not know why he had been let go, but doubted the team's claim that the decision was made because he was hurting beer sales. Instead, he suspected that people believed rampant rumors that he had been having an affair with Susan Busch, daughter-in-law of team president and A–B CEO Gussie Busch. (Note: Susan Busch denied this on the single occasion she has addressed it on the record. Caray also denied it whenever the subject came up, but less consistently, in one interview suggesting the affair had happened while in another quickly changing the subject to say he was flattered that anyone thought she would be attracted to him.)

Caray would be a broadcaster for the Oakland Athletics in 1970, before spending 27 seasons in Chicago with the White Sox (1971–1981) and the Cubs from 1982 until his death prior to the 1998 season.

=== Season standings ===
NL East
Team	W	L	Pct.	GB	Home	Road
New York Mets	100	62	.617	—	52‍–‍30	48‍–‍32
Chicago Cubs	92	70	.568	8	49‍–‍32	43‍–‍38
Pittsburgh Pirates	88	74	.543	12	47‍–‍34	41‍–‍40
St. Louis Cardinals	87	75	.537	13	42‍–‍38	45‍–‍37
Philadelphia Phillies	63	99	.389	37	30‍–‍51	33‍–‍48
Montreal Expos	52	110	.321	48	24‍–‍57	28‍–‍53

=== Record vs. opponents ===
1969 National League record Sources:
Team	ATL	CHC	CIN	HOU	LAD	MON	NYM	PHI	PIT	SD	SF	STL
Atlanta	—	3–9	12–6	15–3	9–9	8–4	4–8	6–6	8–4	13–5	9–9	6–6
Chicago	9–3	—	6–6–1	8–4	6–6	10–8	8–10	12–6	7–11	11–1	6–6	9–9
Cincinnati	6–12	6–6–1	—	9–9	10–8	8–4	6–6	10–2	5–7	11–7	10–8	8–4
Houston	3–15	4–8	9–9	—	6–12	11–1	10–2	8–4	3–9	10–8	10–8	7–5
Los Angeles	9–9	6–6	8–10	12–6	—	10–2	4–8	8–4	8–4	12–6	5–13	3–9
Montreal	4–8	8–10	4–8	1–11	2–10	—	5–13	11–7	5–13	4–8	1–11	7–11
New York	8–4	10–8	6–6	2–10	8–4	13–5	—	12–6	10–8	11–1	8–4	12–6
Philadelphia	6-6	6–12	2–10	4–8	4–8	7–11	6–12	—	10–8	8–4	3–9	7–11
Pittsburgh	4–8	11–7	7–5	9–3	4–8	13–5	8–10	8–10	—	10–2	5–7	9–9
San Diego	5–13	1–11	7–11	8–10	6–12	8–4	1–11	4–8	2–10	—	6–12	4–8
San Francisco	9–9	6–6	8–10	8–10	13–5	11–1	4–8	9–3	7–5	12–6	—	3–9
St. Louis	6–6	9–9	4–8	5–7	9–3	11–7	6–12	11–7	9–9	8–4	9–3	—

=== Opening Day starters ===
- Lou Brock
- Curt Flood
- Bob Gibson
- Julián Javier
- Dal Maxvill
- Tim McCarver
- Vada Pinson
- Mike Shannon
- Joe Torre

=== Notable transactions ===
- April 3, 1969: Bo Belinsky was purchased from the Cardinals by the California Angels.
- May 22, 1969: John Sipin and Sonny Ruberto were traded by the Cardinals to the San Diego Padres for Bill Davis and Jerry DaVanon.
- June 5, 1969: Bill Madlock was drafted by the Cardinals in the 11th round of the 1969 Major League Baseball draft, but did not sign.
- June 14, 1969: Dennis Ribant was traded by the Cardinals to the Cincinnati Reds for Aurelio Monteagudo.

=== Roster ===
1969 St. Louis Cardinals
Roster
Pitchers: 34 Nelson Briles; 30 Sal Campisi; 32 Steve Carlton; 22 Reggie Cleveland; 33 Jim Ellis; 45 Bob Gibson; 39 Dave Giusti; 22 Mudcat Grant; 36 Santiago Guzmán; 19 Tom Hilgendorf; 43 Joe Hoerner; 47 Mel Nelson; 49 Jerry Reuss; 47 Dennis Ribant; 42 Chuck Taylor; 47 Mike Torrez; 44 Ray Washburn; 19 Gary Waslewski; 36 Ron Willis	Catchers: 15 Tim McCarver; 10 Dave Ricketts; 23 Ted Simmons; Infielders: 35 Chip Coulter; 26 Jerry DaVanon; 16 Phil Gagliano; 14 Steve Huntz; 25 Julián Javier; 29 Bob Johnson; 27 Dal Maxvill; 18 Mike Shannon; 9 Joe Torre; 7 Bill White	Outfielders: 20 Lou Brock; 29 Byron Browne; 17 Vic Davalillo; 11 Boots Day; 21 Curt Flood; 12 Joe Hague; 24 Jim Hicks; 37 Leron Lee; 24 Joe Nossek; 28 Vada Pinson	Manager: 2 Red Schoendienst; Coaches: 3 George Kissell; 8 Bob Milliken; 4 Billy Muffett; 5 Dick Sisler

== Player stats ==
= Indicates team leader

= Indicates league leader

=== Batting ===
==== Starters by position ====
Note: Pos = Position; G = Games played; AB = At bats; H = Hits; Avg. = Batting average; HR = Home runs; RBI = Runs batted in

Pos	Player	G	AB	H	Avg.	HR	RBI
C	Tim McCarver	138	515	134	.260	7	51
1B	Joe Torre	159	602	174	.289	18	101
2B	Julián Javier	143	493	139	.282	10	42
SS	Dal Maxvill	132	372	65	.175	2	32
3B	Mike Shannon	150	551	140	.254	12	55
LF	Lou Brock	157	655	195	.298	12	47
CF	Curt Flood	153	606	173	.285	4	57
RF	Vada Pinson	132	495	126	.255	10	70

==== Other batters ====
Note: G = Games played; AB = At bats; H = Hits; Avg. = Batting average; HR = Home runs; RBI = Runs batted in

Player	G	AB	H	Avg.	HR	RBI
Steve Huntz	71	139	27	.194	3	13
Phil Gagliano	62	128	29	.227	1	10
Joe Hague	40	100	17	.170	2	8
Vic Davalillo	63	98	26	.265	2	10
Bill White	49	57	12	.211	0	4
Byron Browne	22	53	12	.226	1	7
Dave Ricketts	30	44	12	.273	0	5
Jim Hicks	19	44	8	.182	1	3
Jerry DaVanon	16	40	12	.300	1	7
Bob Johnson	19	29	6	.207	1	2
Leron Lee	7	23	5	.217	0	0
Chip Coulter	6	19	6	.316	0	4
Ted Simmons	5	14	3	.214	0	3
Boots Day	11	6	0	.000	0	0
Joe Nossek	9	5	1	.200	0	0

=== Pitching ===
==== Starting pitchers ====
Note: G = Games pitched; IP = Innings pitched; W = Wins; L = Losses; ERA = Earned run average; SO = Strikeouts

Player	G	IP	W	L	ERA	SO
Bob Gibson	35	314.0	20	13	2.18	269
Steve Carlton	31	236.1	17	11	2.17	210
Nelson Briles	36	227.2	15	13	3.52	126
Santiago Guzmán	1	7.1	0	1	4.91	7
Jerry Reuss	1	7.0	1	0	0.00	3
Reggie Cleveland	1	4.0	0	0	9.00	3

==== Other pitchers ====
Note: G = Games pitched; IP = Innings pitched; W = Wins; L = Losses; ERA = Earned run average; SO = Strikeouts

Player	G	IP	W	L	ERA	SO
Ray Washburn	28	132.1	3	8	3.06	80
Chuck Taylor	27	126.2	7	5	2.56	62
Mike Torrez	24	107.2	10	4	3.59	61
Dave Giusti	22	99.2	3	7	3.61	62
Jim Ellis	2	5.1	0	0	1.69	0

==== Relief pitchers ====
Note: G = Games pitched; W = Wins; L = Losses; SV = Saves; ERA = Earned run average; SO = Strikeouts

Player	G	W	L	SV	ERA	SO
Joe Hoerner	45	2	3	15	2.87	35
Mudcat Grant	30	7	5	7	4.12	35
Ron Willis	26	1	2	0	4.18	23
Gary Waslewski	12	0	2	1	3.92	16
Mel Nelson	8	0	1	0	11.81	3
Sal Campisi	7	1	0	0	0.93	7
Tom Hilgendorf	6	0	0	2	1.42	2
Dennis Ribant	1	0	0	0	13.50	0
Vic Davalillo	1	0	0	0	inf	0

== Awards and honors ==
- Lou Brock, League leader, Stolen Bases
- Bob Gibson, Pitcher, Gold Glove Award
- Curt Flood, Outfield, Gold Glove Award

All-Star Game

- Steve Carlton, P, Starter
- Bob Gibson, P, Reserve

== Farm system ==
Level	Team	League	Manager
AAA	Tulsa Oilers	American Association	Warren Spahn
AA	Arkansas Travelers	Texas League	Ray Hathaway
A	Modesto Reds	California League	Joe Cunningham
A	St. Petersburg Cardinals	Florida State League	Jack Krol
A	Cedar Rapids Cardinals	Midwest League	Roy Majtyka
A-Short Season	Lewis-Clark Broncs	Northwest League	Bobby Dews
Rookie	GCL Cardinals	Gulf Coast League	Tom Burgess
