= 1969 Los Angeles Dodgers season =

1969 Los Angeles Dodgers
- League: National League
- Division: West
- Ballpark: Dodger Stadium
- City: Los Angeles
- Record: 85–77 (.525)
- Divisional place: 4th
- Owners: Walter O'Malley, James Mulvey
- President: Walter O'Malley
- General managers: Al Campanis
- Managers: Walter Alston
- Television: KTTV (11)
- Radio: KFI; Vin Scully, Jerry Doggett; KWKW; Jose Garcia, Jaime Jarrín

The 1969 Los Angeles Dodgers season was the 80th season for the Los Angeles Dodgers franchise in Major League Baseball (MLB), their 12th season in Los Angeles, California, and their 8th season playing their home games at Dodger Stadium in Los Angeles California. The Dodgers finished in fourth place in the new National League West, eight games behind the Atlanta Braves. The Dodgers' record for 1969 was 85–77, which was nine wins better than 1968.

== Offseason ==
- October 21, 1968: Bob Bailey was purchased from the Dodgers by the Montreal Expos.
- October 21, 1968: Jim Ellis was traded by the Dodgers to St. Louis Cardinals for Pete Mikkelsen.
- December 4, 1968: Mike Kekich was traded by the Dodgers to the New York Yankees for Andy Kosco.
- December 5, 1968: Jim Campanis was acquired from the Dodgers by the Kansas City Royals.
- March 30, 1969: Ted Savage was traded by the Dodgers to the Cincinnati Reds for Jimmie Schaffer.

== Regular season ==
After finishing 8th in 1967 and 7th in 1968, the Dodgers looked to improve in 1969 with the addition of youngsters Ted Sizemore, Bill Sudakis, and by obtaining Tom Haller in a trade. The Dodgers started fast and on June 10, they were in 2nd place at 31–22, 1 game back in a wild 5 team N.L. West race. On June 11, they reacquired Maury Wills in a trade, and obtained Manny Mota in the same deal for Ron Fairly and Paul Popovich. By July 16, they were in 1st place, and after beating the Mets on September 3, they were in second place, 1 game back. Centerfielder Willie Davis had just extended his club record 31 game hitting streak. They headed to San Diego to face the expansion Padres in a 4-game series and disaster struck. They scored 4 runs in 4 games, lost 4 in a row, and Davis had his hitting streak stopped in the first game. They left San Diego in 4th place, still only 2 1/2 games out. They rebounded somewhat, and when they beat the Atlanta Braves on September 18, they were one-half game behind co-leaders Atlanta and the San Francisco Giants as they headed to San Francisco. The pressure of the season long five team pennant race got to this young team, as they lost 10 of their next 11 games, ultimately finishing 85–77, 8 games behind division winning Atlanta.

=== Impact ===
While they did not win the division, the 1969 Dodgers marked the start of a turnaround for the franchise. After finishing 8th and 7th in 1967 and 1968 respectively, they would not finish in the bottom half of the standings again until 1984. Ted Sizemore won the rookie of the year award, and other youngsters like Steve Garvey, Bill Russell, Von Joshua, Bobby Valentine, and Bill Buckner contributed in back up roles. Waiting in the wings in the minors were Ron Cey, Davey Lopes, Tom Paciorek, and manager Tommy Lasorda.

=== Season standings ===
NL West
Team	W	L	Pct.	GB	Home	Road
Atlanta Braves	93	69	.574	—	50‍–‍31	43‍–‍38
San Francisco Giants	90	72	.556	3	52‍–‍29	38‍–‍43
Cincinnati Reds	89	73	.549	4	50‍–‍31	39‍–‍42
Los Angeles Dodgers	85	77	.525	8	50‍–‍31	35‍–‍46
Houston Astros	81	81	.500	12	52‍–‍29	29‍–‍52
San Diego Padres	52	110	.321	41	28‍–‍53	24‍–‍57

=== Record vs. opponents ===
1969 National League record Sources:
Team	ATL	CHC	CIN	HOU	LAD	MON	NYM	PHI	PIT	SD	SF	STL
Atlanta	—	3–9	12–6	15–3	9–9	8–4	4–8	6–6	8–4	13–5	9–9	6–6
Chicago	9–3	—	6–6–1	8–4	6–6	10–8	8–10	12–6	7–11	11–1	6–6	9–9
Cincinnati	6–12	6–6–1	—	9–9	10–8	8–4	6–6	10–2	5–7	11–7	10–8	8–4
Houston	3–15	4–8	9–9	—	6–12	11–1	10–2	8–4	3–9	10–8	10–8	7–5
Los Angeles	9–9	6–6	8–10	12–6	—	10–2	4–8	8–4	8–4	12–6	5–13	3–9
Montreal	4–8	8–10	4–8	1–11	2–10	—	5–13	11–7	5–13	4–8	1–11	7–11
New York	8–4	10–8	6–6	2–10	8–4	13–5	—	12–6	10–8	11–1	8–4	12–6
Philadelphia	6-6	6–12	2–10	4–8	4–8	7–11	6–12	—	10–8	8–4	3–9	7–11
Pittsburgh	4–8	11–7	7–5	9–3	4–8	13–5	8–10	8–10	—	10–2	5–7	9–9
San Diego	5–13	1–11	7–11	8–10	6–12	8–4	1–11	4–8	2–10	—	6–12	4–8
San Francisco	9–9	6–6	8–10	8–10	13–5	11–1	4–8	9–3	7–5	12–6	—	3–9
St. Louis	6–6	9–9	4–8	5–7	9–3	11–7	6–12	11–7	9–9	8–4	9–3	—

=== Opening Day lineup ===
Opening Day starters
Name	Position
Willie Crawford	Center fielder
Len Gabrielson	Right fielder
Bill Sudakis	Third baseman
Ron Fairly	First baseman
Andy Kosco	Left fielder
Tom Haller	Catcher
Jim Lefebvre	Second baseman
Ted Sizemore	Shortstop
Don Drysdale	Starting pitcher

=== Notable transactions ===
- April 17, 1969: Tommy Dean and Leon Everitt were traded by the Dodgers to the San Diego Padres for Al McBean.
- June 11, 1969: Ron Fairly and Paul Popovich were traded by the Dodgers to the Montreal Expos for Maury Wills and Manny Mota.
- August 15, 1969: Chuck Goggin, Ron Mitchell (minors) and cash were traded by the Dodgers to the Pittsburgh Pirates for Jim Bunning.
- September 1, 1969: Jack Jenkins was purchased by the Dodgers from the Washington Senators.

=== Roster ===
1969 Los Angeles Dodgers
Roster
Pitchers: 21 Jim Brewer; 17 Jim Bunning; 34 Bobby Darwin; 53 Don Drysdale; 44 Alan Foster; 29 Jack Jenkins; 42 Ray Lamb; 31 Al McBean; 46 Pete Mikkelsen; 25 Joe Moeller; 23 Claude Osteen; 35 John Purdin; 40 Bill Singer; 20 Don Sutton	Catchers: 15 Tom Haller; 8 Bob Stinson; 10 Jeff Torborg; Infielders: 45 Ken Boyer; 6 Ron Fairly; 1 Billy Grabarkewitz; 4 Tommy Hutton; 5 Jim Lefebvre; 28 Wes Parker; 22 Paul Popovich; 41 Ted Sizemore; 16 Bill Sudakis; 30 Maury Wills	Outfielders: 27 Willie Crawford; 3 Willie Davis; 14 Len Gabrielson; 12 Von Joshua; 9 Andy Kosco; 43 John Miller; 11 Manny Mota; 18 Bill Russell; Other batters: 38 Bill Buckner; 6 Steve Garvey; 2 Bobby Valentine	Manager: 24 Walter Alston; Coaches: 26 Red Adams; 52 Carroll Beringer; 19 Jim Gilliam; 7 Roy Hartsfield; 33 Danny Ozark

== Player stats ==
=== Batting ===
==== Starters by position ====
Note: Pos = Position; G = Games played; AB = At bats; H = Hits; Avg. = Batting average; HR = Home runs; RBI = Runs batted in

Pos	Player	G	AB	H	Avg.	HR	RBI
C	Tom Haller	134	445	117	.263	6	39
1B	Wes Parker	132	471	131	.278	13	68
2B	Ted Sizemore	159	590	160	.271	4	46
3B	Bill Sudakis	132	462	108	.234	14	53
SS	Maury Wills	104	434	129	.297	4	39
LF	Manny Mota	85	294	95	.323	3	30
CF	Willie Davis	129	498	155	.311	11	59
RF	Andy Kosco	120	424	105	.248	19	74

==== Other batters ====
Note: G = Games played; AB = At bats; H = Hits; Avg. = Batting average; HR = Home runs; RBI = Runs batted in

Player	G	AB	H	Avg.	HR	RBI
Willie Crawford	129	389	96	.247	11	41
Jim Lefebvre	95	275	65	.236	4	44
Bill Russell	98	212	48	.226	5	15
Len Gabrielson	83	178	48	.270	1	18
Jeff Torborg	51	124	23	.185	0	7
Billy Grabarkewitz	34	65	6	.092	0	5
Ron Fairly	30	64	14	.219	0	8
Paul Popovich	28	50	10	.200	0	4
Tommy Hutton	16	48	13	.271	0	4
John Miller	26	38	8	.211	1	1
Ken Boyer	25	34	7	.206	0	4
Bob Stinson	4	8	3	.375	0	2
Von Joshua	14	8	2	.250	0	0
Steve Garvey	3	3	1	.333	0	0
Bill Buckner	1	1	0	.000	0	0
Bobby Valentine	5	0	0	----	0	0

=== Pitching ===
==== Starting pitchers ====
Note: G = Games pitched; IP = Innings pitched; W = Wins; L = Losses; ERA = Earned run average; SO = Strikeouts

Player	G	IP	W	L	ERA	SO
Claude Osteen	41	321.0	20	15	2.66	183
Bill Singer	41	315.2	20	12	2.34	247
Don Sutton	41	293.1	17	18	3.47	217
Don Drysdale	12	62.2	5	4	4.45	24
Jim Bunning	9	56.1	3	1	3.36	33

==== Other pitchers ====
Note: G = Games pitched; IP = Innings pitched; W = Wins; L = Losses; ERA = Earned run average; SO = Strikeouts

Player	G	IP	W	L	ERA	SO
Alan Foster	24	102.2	3	9	4.38	59
Joe Moeller	23	51.1	1	0	3.33	25

==== Relief pitchers ====
Note: G = Games pitched; W = Wins; L = Losses; SV = Saves; ERA = Earned run average; SO = Strikeouts

Player	G	W	L	SV	ERA	SO
Jim Brewer	59	7	6	20	2.55	92
Pete Mikkelsen	48	7	5	4	2.77	51
Al McBean	31	2	6	4	3.91	26
Ray Lamb	10	0	1	1	1.80	11
John Purdin	9	0	0	0	6.06	6
Bobby Darwin	3	0	0	0	9.82	0
Jack Jenkins	1	0	0	0	0.00	1

== Awards and honors ==
- National League Rookie of the Year
  - Ted Sizemore
- Gold Glove Award
  - Wes Parker
- NL Player of the Month
  - Willie Davis (August 1969)

=== All-Stars ===
- 1969 Major League Baseball All-Star Game
  - Bill Singer, reserve

== Farm system ==
Level	Team	League	Manager
AAA	Spokane Indians	Pacific Coast League	Tommy Lasorda
AA	Albuquerque Dodgers	Texas League	Del Crandall
A	Bakersfield Dodgers	California League	Don LeJohn
A	Daytona Beach Dodgers	Florida State League	Bob Shaw
A	Rogue Valley Dodgers	Northwest League	Bill Berrier
Rookie	Ogden Dodgers	Pioneer League	Ray Malgradi

LEAGUE CHAMPIONS: Rogue Valley, Ogden

== 1969 Major League Baseball draft ==
This was the fifth year of a Major League Baseball draft. The Dodgers drafted 47 players in the June draft and 11 in the January draft, eight of them would play in MLB.

The Dodgers first round selection in the June draft, High School Catcher Terry McDermott did make it to the Majors, in 1972, but played only nine games.

The only player from this draft class who made any impact in the Majors was Lee Lacy, who was drafted twice this year... as a third baseman in the January draft and as a pitcher in the June draft. He was primarily an outfielder in the Majors, and played through 1987 with the Dodgers, Braves, Pirates and Orioles.

1969 draft picks

=== January draft ===
Round	Name	Position	School	Signed	Career span	Highest level
1	Michael Kimbrell	2B		Yes	1969–1970	A
2	Lee Lacy	3B	Laney College	No; Dodgers – June 1969	1969–1987	MLB
3	Carl Salyers	RHP	Southwestern Christian Junior College	No		
4	Bob O'Brien	LHP	Fresno City College	No; Dodgers – June 1969	1969–1974	MLB
5	Dean Voegerl	LHP	Trinidad State Junior College	No		
6	Dave Maas	2B	Fullerton College	No		

==== January secondary phase ====
Round	Name	Position	School	Signed	Career span	Highest level
1	Pat Harrison	INF	University of Southern California	No		
2	William Camp	RHP	Oklahoma State University	No; Cubs – 1970	1970	AA
3	George Pugh	LHP	Mesa Community College	No		
4	William Ferguson	1B	Texas Christian University	No; Reds – 1969 June	1969–1972	AAA
5	George Putz	1B	Springfield College	No; Cardinals – 1969 June	1969–1973	AAA

=== June draft ===
Round	Name	Position	School	Signed	Career span	Highest level
1	Terry McDermott	C	St. Agnes High School	Yes	1969–1976	MLB
2	Lee Lacy	LHP	Putnam City High School	Yes	1969–1987	MLB
3	Al Dawson	OF	Lyndhurst High School	Yes	1968–1972	AAA
4	Bob O'Brien	OF	Texas A&M University	Yes	1969–1974	MLB
5	Mark Mechuk	RHP	St. Bernard High School	No		
6	Stan Wall	LHP	Raytown South High School	Yes	1969–1978	MLB
7	James Cardasis	OF	New York University	Yes	1969–1971	A
8	Kenneth Bruno	SS	Cliffside Park High School	Yes	1969	A-
9	Larry President	LHP	Temple High School	Yes	1969–1975	AAA
10	Ronald Mitchell	OF	Aqua Fria High School	Yes	1969–1980	AAA
11	John Hughes	1B	Parkwood High School	Yes	1969–1973	AA
12	Stanley Russell	RHP	Villa Park High School	Yes	1969–1972	A
13	Ronald Dolan	2B	Seton Hall University	No		
14	Arthur Pauls	RHP	Lewis University	Yes	1969–1971	A
15	Roy Staiger	SS	Bacone College	No; Mets – 1970	1970–1980	MLB
16	Jimmy Page	RHP	Hardesty High School	No		
17	Edgar Bellamy	SS	Fort Cobb High School	No		
18	Mark Pastrovich	LHP	Mascoutah High School	No; Twins – 1970	1970	A
19	Anthony Blakley	SS	Sullivan West High School	No; Pirates – 1971	1971	Rookie
20	Donald Sweetland	C	Saddleback College	No		
21	Joseph Szewczyk	1B	New York University	Yes	1969	Rookie
22	Royle Stillman	OF	North Torrance High School	Yes	1969–1981	MLB
23	Manuel Washington	OF	Mississippi State University	Yes	1969–1972	AA
24	David Allen	LHP	California Western University	Yes	1970–1974	AAA
25	William Owen	3B	Willington High School	No		
26	Jim Fuller	OF	San Diego City College	No; Orioles – 1970	1970–1978	MLB
27	Johnny Hatcher	RHP	Andrews High School	No		
28	Harry Chapman	RHP	Sarasota High School	No		
29	George Horman	C	Crawford High School	No		
30	Nick Devirgilis	OF	Sarasota High School	No		
31	Jeffrey Hogan	SS	Florida State University	No; Tigers – 1970	1970–1973	AA
32	Raymond Ippolito	SS	New York University	No		
33	Robert Cox	RHP	Southeast High School	No		
34	Vincent D'amico	1B	University of Albuquerque	Yes	1969	A-
35	Jerry Arnold	LHP	Woodward High School	No		
36	William Wyles	LHP	New Mexico Military Institute	No		
37	Gary Granville	OF	El Camino College	No; Angels – 1970	1970–1973	A
38	Johnny Rodgers	INF	Tech High School	No		
39	Gary Erskine	OF	Anderson High School	No		
40	Dennis Haren	OF	Bishop Montgomery High School	Yes	1969–1974	AA
41	Rod Boone	C	Crawford High School	No; Royals – 1972	1972–1975	AAA
42	Robert Sicilia	OF	John R. Rogers High School	Yes	1969	A-
43	Robert Payne	OF	University of California, Riverside	Yes	1969	A-

==== June secondary phase ====
Round	Name	Position	School	Signed	Career span	Highest level
1	Bill Seinsoth	1B	University of Southern California	Yes	1969	A
2	Bob Randall	SS	Kansas State University	Yes	1969–1980	MLB
3	Steven Wilmet	LHP	St. Norbert College	Yes	1969	A-
4	Randall Bayer	OF	Mesa Community College	Yes	1969–1972	A
