= Alex Grammas =

American baseball player and manager (1926–2019)

- Infielder / Manager
- Born: April 3, 1926; Birmingham, Alabama, U.S.
- Died: September 13, 2019 (aged 93); Vestavia Hills, Alabama, U.S.
- Batted: Right Threw: Right

MLB debut
- April 13, 1954, for the St. Louis Cardinals

Last MLB appearance
- September 29, 1963, for the Chicago Cubs

MLB statistics
- Batting average: .247
- Home runs: 12
- Runs batted in: 163
- Managerial record: 137–191
- Winning %: .418
- Stats at Baseball Reference

Teams
- As player: St. Louis Cardinals (1954–1956); Cincinnati Redlegs (1956–1958); St. Louis Cardinals (1959–1962); Chicago Cubs (1962–1963); As manager: Pittsburgh Pirates (1969); Milwaukee Brewers (1976–1977); As coach: Chicago Cubs (1964); Pittsburgh Pirates (1965–1969); Cincinnati Reds (1970–1975, 1978); Atlanta Braves (1979); Detroit Tigers (1980–1991)

Career highlights and awards
- 2× World Series champion (1975, 1984)

Alexander Peter Grammas (Greek: Αλέξανδρος Πέτρος Γράμμας; April 3, 1926 – September 13, 2019) was an Greek-American professional baseball infielder, manager and coach. A native of Birmingham, Alabama, Grammas played in Major League Baseball (MLB) for the St. Louis Cardinals, Cincinnati Redlegs and Chicago Cubs. He threw and batted right-handed, and was listed as 6 feet (1.83 m) tall and 175 pounds (79 kg). Grammas's Athenian family origins are from Agios Dimitrios, Athens, Greece.

== Playing career ==
Grammas attended Mississippi State University and signed with the Chicago White Sox in 1949. During his third season in the ChiSox' farm system, he was acquired by Cincinnati in 1951 and continued his minor league apprenticeship in the Reds' organization. Loaned to the New York Yankees' Kansas City Blues affiliate in 1953 (Cincinnati at the time lacked a Triple-A farm team), Grammas collected a career-high 179 hits and batted .307. He was named the American Association's All-Star shortstop.

With Roy McMillan blocking his path in Cincinnati, the Redlegs traded Grammas in December 1953 to the St. Louis Cardinals; the trade marked an unusual "ping-pong" trend in Grammas' playing career, as he would bounce between Cincinnati (prior to 1954; 1956–58) and St. Louis (1954–56; 1959–62) during the 1950s. The Cardinals finally broke the pattern in June 1962 by trading Grammas to the Cubs, where he finished his career (1962–63).

Grammas was the Cardinals' starting shortstop in 1954, 1955 and 1959 and ranked no lower than third in fielding percentage among National League shortstops each season; he finished his career with a .969 overall fielding mark. He was a reserve infielder with the Redlegs and Cubs. All told, he appeared in 913 games played over ten MLB seasons, collecting 512 hits, with 90 doubles, ten triples, 12 home runs and 163 runs batted in. He batted .247 lifetime.

== Managerial and coaching career ==
In 1964, Grammas began his managing career as skipper of the Cubs' Double-A affiliate, the Fort Worth Cats of the Texas League. Although he spent the entire year at Fort Worth, as one of the Cubs' minor league pilots he was listed as a member of the Cubs' College of Coaches that season. He then joined Harry Walker's staff as the third base coach for the Pittsburgh Pirates in 1965, staying on following Walker's dismissal in mid-1967. He began his big-league managerial career when he was asked finish out the Pirates' 1969 season after Larry Shepard was fired as the team's manager on September 26. Although Grammas guided the 1969 Bucs to a 4–1 finish, Danny Murtaugh took over as the team's manager in 1970.

Grammas then returned to the Cincinnati Reds as third base coach under Sparky Anderson, spending six seasons in that post during the "Big Red Machine" era, including service on Cincinnati's 1970 and 1972 National League champions and the 1975 world champions.

After the Milwaukee Brewers fired Del Crandall as manager near the end of the 1975 season, his place was taken on an interim basis by Harvey Kuenn. But following the 1975 World Series, the Brewers set their sights on Grammas as their next skipper, and signed him to a three-year contract in November 1975. Milwaukee Brewers President Bud Selig said that Grammas was the only manager they wanted. He added, "There is no question in our mind, we got the best man available. In the years I've been in baseball, never has anybody been recommended by as broad a spectrum of people as Alex Grammas."

Grammas was, however, unable to bring the success he had seen with the Reds to Milwaukee. In 1976 and 1977, Grammas led the Brewers to consecutive sixth-place finishes in the American League Eastern Division, in which the Brewers finished 32 and 33 games, respectively, out of first place. Only the expansion 1977 Toronto Blue Jays, who lost 107 games in their inaugural season, kept the Brewers from consecutive last-place finishes under Grammas. A 10–5 start in 1976 led Sports Illustrated to publish a story praising Grammas' positive attitude and mental approach to the game. But the Brewers faded soon thereafter, losing 22 of their last 26 games.

Internal signs of trouble were evident by mid-season in 1977. With the Brewers at 39–45, Brewers reserve first baseman Mike Hegan, who was dissatisfied with his playing time under Grammas, made national news by saying "Grammas is a nice guy, but as a manager, he makes a good third base coach". Hegan added, "I think that we all expected that, when he came over here, he was going to provide motivation and leadership...but that hasn't happened". Grammas, for his part said some players were not putting out as much effort as they had earlier in the season, that every team has players who "cop out", including the Brewers, that the team had not played up to its potential, and that "I would say there have been times that we could have put out a lot harder". After this point, the Brewers went 27–50. On November 21, 1977, Brewers President Bud Selig fired both Grammas and General Manager Jim Baumer. Grammas ended his managerial career with a record of 137–191.

Grammas then returned to the coaching ranks and the Reds in 1978 as a member of Anderson's staff; then, after Anderson's controversial firing, Grammas coached under Bobby Cox with the 1979 Atlanta Braves. In mid-June of 1979, Anderson was hired as skipper of the Detroit Tigers, and during his first off-season as Detroit's manager, he added Grammas to his staff as third base coach, where Grammas served for 12 consecutive years (1980–91), including on the Tigers' 1984 world championship season.

== Death ==
Grammas died at his home in Birmingham, Alabama on September 13, 2019.

Preceded by Frank Oceak	Pittsburgh Pirates third base coach 1965–1969	Succeeded by Frank Oceak
Preceded by Vern Benson; George Scherger	Cincinnati Reds third base coach 1970–1975; 1978	Succeeded by George Scherger; Ron Plaza
Preceded by Tom Burgess	Atlanta Braves third base coach 1979	Succeeded by Bobby Dews
Preceded by Dick Tracewski	Detroit Tigers third base coach 1980–1991	Succeeded by Dick Tracewski
