= Charlie Vaughan (baseball) =

American baseball player (born 1947)

- Pitcher
- Born: October 6, 1947 (age 77); Mercedes, Texas
- Batted: Right Threw: Left

MLB debut
- September 3, 1966, for the Atlanta Braves

Last MLB appearance
- June 1, 1969, for the Atlanta Braves

MLB statistics
- Win–loss record: 1–0
- Earned run average: 4.50
- Strikeouts: 7
- Stats at Baseball Reference

Teams
- Atlanta Braves (1966, 1969)

Charles Wayne Vaughan (born October 6, 1947) is a former Major League Baseball pitcher who played for two seasons. He pitched for the Atlanta Braves for one game during the 1966 Atlanta Braves season and one game during the 1969 Atlanta Braves season. Vaughn was the youngest player to play in the MLB in 1966, the second youngest being Nolan Ryan. Vaughan had one career hit in four at bats.
