= Jack Jenkins (baseball) =

American baseball player (1942–2002)

- Pitcher
- Born: December 22, 1942; Covington, Virginia, U.S.
- Died: June 18, 2002 (aged 59); Tampa, Florida, U.S.
- Batted: Right Threw: Right

MLB debut
- September 13, 1962, for the Washington Senators

Last MLB appearance
- September 30, 1969, for the Los Angeles Dodgers

MLB statistics
- Win–loss record: 0–3
- Earned run average: 4.73
- Strikeouts Walks: 16; 19
- Innings pitched: 26 2/3
- Stats at Baseball Reference

Teams
- Washington Senators (1962–1963); Los Angeles Dodgers (1969)

Warren Washington Jenkins (December 22, 1942 – June 18, 2002) was an American right-handed pitcher in Major League Baseball. Born in Covington, Virginia, he pitched for the Washington Senators from 1962 to 1963 and for the Los Angeles Dodgers in 1969. Jenkins died at age 59 in Tampa, Florida.
