= Gene Stone (baseball) =

American baseball player (1944-2009)

- First baseman / Pinch hitter
- Born: January 16, 1944; Burbank, California
- Died: March 1, 2009 (aged 65); Colorado Springs, Colorado
- Batted: Left Threw: Left

MLB debut
- May 13, 1969, for the Philadelphia Phillies

Last MLB appearance
- June 28, 1969, for the Philadelphia Phillies

MLB statistics
- Games: 18
- Batting averages: .214
- Hits: 6
- Stats at Baseball Reference

Teams
- Philadelphia Phillies (1969)

Eugene Daniel Stone (January 16, 1944 – March 1, 2009) was an American professional baseball player. Born in Burbank, California, he was a first baseman who appeared in 18 games in Major League Baseball for the Philadelphia Phillies in 1969. He threw and batted left-handed and was listed as 5 feet 11 inches (1.80 m) tall and 190 pounds (86 kg). He attended Citrus College.

Stone's pro career lasted for five seasons (1963–1964; 1967–1969), all in the Philadelphia system, and he hit 19, 21 and 20 home runs in successive minor-league campaigns. His 18-game MLB stint, in May and June 1969, included five starts at first base. Of his six career hits, one went for extra bases, a triple on June 20 against Lou Marone of the Pittsburgh Pirates.

Stone died in Colorado Springs at the age of 65.
