= Garry Hill (baseball) =

American baseball player (1946–2017)

- Pitcher
- Born: November 3, 1946; Rutherfordton, North Carolina, U.S.
- Died: September 20, 2017 (aged 70); Charlotte, North Carolina, U.S.
- Batted: Right Threw: Right

MLB debut
- June 12, 1969, for the Atlanta Braves

Last MLB appearance
- June 12, 1969, for the Atlanta Braves

MLB statistics
- Win–loss record: 0–1
- Strikeouts: 2
- Earned run average: 15.43
- Stats at Baseball Reference

Teams
- Atlanta Braves (1969)

Garry Alton Hill (November 3, 1946 – September 20, 2017) was an American Major League Baseball pitcher. He attended Garinger High School in Charlotte, North Carolina, and played college baseball for the University of North Carolina at Chapel Hill.

In 1965 he helped lead the Garinger High baseball team to the North Carolina 4A state title. He also played American Legion baseball for the Charlotte Post 9, where they made back-to-back national championship appearances in 1964 and 1965, winning the American Legion national championship in 1965.

After his sophomore year in college, he was drafted in the first round (18th overall) of the 1967 Major League Baseball June secondary draft by the Atlanta Braves. He was starting pitcher for one home game with the Atlanta Braves on June 12, 1969, at Atlanta Stadium against pitcher Dick Selma, striking out two, and one walk. He also gave up four earned runs on six hits, one was a home run to Al Spangler in the 2nd inning. He pitched two and one-thirds innings pitched and had a 15.43 earned run average

He died September 20, 2017, at the age of 70, in Charlotte, North Carolina.
