= Rick Kester =

American baseball player (born 1946)

- Pitcher
- Born: July 7, 1946 (age 80); Iola, Kansas, U.S.
- Batted: Right Threw: Right

MLB debut
- August 18, 1968, for the Atlanta Braves

Last MLB appearance
- September 27, 1970, for the Atlanta Braves

MLB statistics
- Win–loss record: 0–0
- Earned run average: 5.98
- Strikeouts: 31
- Stats at Baseball Reference

Teams
- Atlanta Braves (1968–1970)

Richard Lee Kester (born July 7, 1946) is an American former Major League Baseball pitcher. Kester played for the Atlanta Braves from 1968 to 1970.
