= 1969 Cincinnati Reds season =

1969 Cincinnati Reds
- League: National League
- Division: West
- Ballpark: Crosley Field
- City: Cincinnati
- Record: 89–73 (.549)
- Divisional place: 3rd
- Owners: Francis L. Dale
- General managers: Bob Howsam
- Managers: Dave Bristol
- Television: WLW (Ed Kennedy, Pee Wee Reese)
- Radio: WLW (Jim McIntyre, Joe Nuxhall)

The 1969 Cincinnati Reds season was the 100th season for the franchise in Major League Baseball. The Reds finished in third place in the newly established National League West, four games behind the National League West champion Atlanta Braves. The Reds were managed by Dave Bristol, and played their home games at Crosley Field, which was in its final full season of operation, before moving into their new facility in the middle of the following season. The Reds led the major leagues this year with 798 runs scored.

== Offseason ==
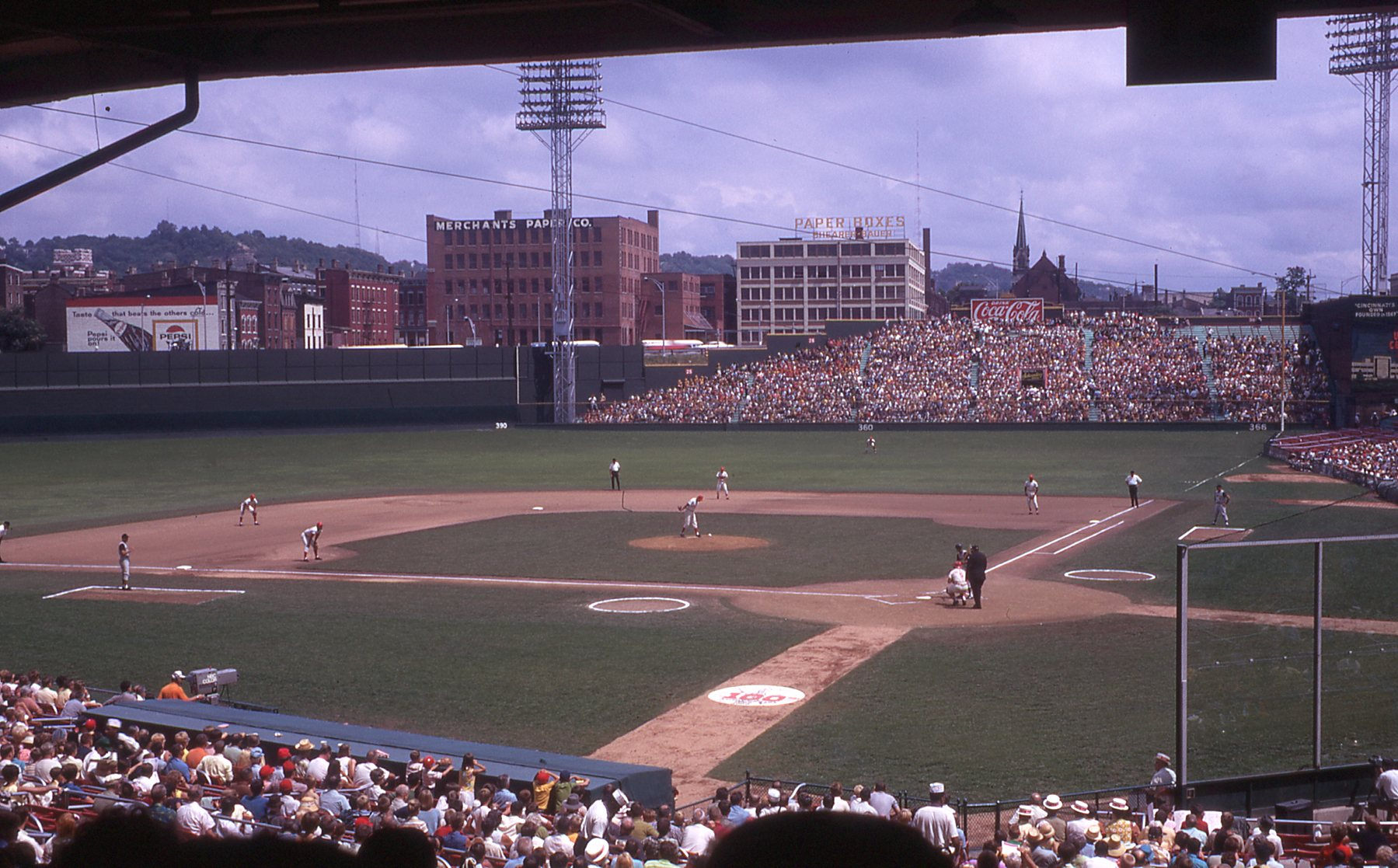
Crosley Field, pictured in August 1969

- October 14, 1968: Jimy Williams was drafted from the Reds by the Montreal Expos as the 32nd pick in the 1968 MLB expansion draft.
- December 5, 1968: Don Pavletich and Don Secrist were traded by the Reds to the Chicago White Sox for Jack Fisher.
- March 18, 1969: Bill Kelso was purchased from the Reds by the Boston Red Sox.
- March 29, 1969: Bill Kelso was returned to the Reds by the Boston Red Sox.

=== Divisional alignment ===
1969 not only marked the 100th anniversary of the original Cincinnati Red Stockings being the first fully professional baseball team, but it also marked the first year of divisional play in Major League Baseball. The Reds (along with the Atlanta Braves) were placed in the National League West division, despite being located further east than the two westernmost teams in the NL East division, the Chicago Cubs and St. Louis Cardinals. This was because the New York Mets wanted to be in the same division as the reigning power in the NL, which were the Cardinals at the time (to compensate for playing against the Dodgers and Giants fewer times each season). The Cubs consequently demanded to be in the NL East as well in order to continue playing in the same division as the Cardinals, one of the Cubs' biggest rivals. A side effect of this alignment is that it set the stage for what is considered one of the greatest pennant races – and comebacks in such a race – in MLB history (see 1969 New York Mets season for more info).

== Regular season ==
=== Season standings ===
NL West
Team	W	L	Pct.	GB	Home	Road
Atlanta Braves	93	69	.574	—	50‍–‍31	43‍–‍38
San Francisco Giants	90	72	.556	3	52‍–‍29	38‍–‍43
Cincinnati Reds	89	73	.549	4	50‍–‍31	39‍–‍42
Los Angeles Dodgers	85	77	.525	8	50‍–‍31	35‍–‍46
Houston Astros	81	81	.500	12	52‍–‍29	29‍–‍52
San Diego Padres	52	110	.321	41	28‍–‍53	24‍–‍57

=== Record vs. opponents ===
1969 National League record Sources:
Team	ATL	CHC	CIN	HOU	LAD	MON	NYM	PHI	PIT	SD	SF	STL
Atlanta	—	3–9	12–6	15–3	9–9	8–4	4–8	6–6	8–4	13–5	9–9	6–6
Chicago	9–3	—	6–6–1	8–4	6–6	10–8	8–10	12–6	7–11	11–1	6–6	9–9
Cincinnati	6–12	6–6–1	—	9–9	10–8	8–4	6–6	10–2	5–7	11–7	10–8	8–4
Houston	3–15	4–8	9–9	—	6–12	11–1	10–2	8–4	3–9	10–8	10–8	7–5
Los Angeles	9–9	6–6	8–10	12–6	—	10–2	4–8	8–4	8–4	12–6	5–13	3–9
Montreal	4–8	8–10	4–8	1–11	2–10	—	5–13	11–7	5–13	4–8	1–11	7–11
New York	8–4	10–8	6–6	2–10	8–4	13–5	—	12–6	10–8	11–1	8–4	12–6
Philadelphia	6-6	6–12	2–10	4–8	4–8	7–11	6–12	—	10–8	8–4	3–9	7–11
Pittsburgh	4–8	11–7	7–5	9–3	4–8	13–5	8–10	8–10	—	10–2	5–7	9–9
San Diego	5–13	1–11	7–11	8–10	6–12	8–4	1–11	4–8	2–10	—	6–12	4–8
San Francisco	9–9	6–6	8–10	8–10	13–5	11–1	4–8	9–3	7–5	12–6	—	3–9
St. Louis	6–6	9–9	4–8	5–7	9–3	11–7	6–12	11–7	9–9	8–4	9–3	—

=== Notable transactions ===
- June 5, 1969: 1969 Major League Baseball draft
  - Nardi Contreras was drafted by the Reds in the 12th round.
  - Ken Griffey, Sr. was drafted by the Reds in the 29th round.
- June 13, 1969: Al Jackson was purchased by the Reds from the New York Mets.
- June 14, 1969: Aurelio Monteagudo was traded by the Reds to the St. Louis Cardinals for Dennis Ribant.

=== Roster ===
1969 Cincinnati Reds
Roster
Pitchers: 35 Gerry Arrigo; 36 Clay Carroll; 40 Tony Cloninger; 39 George Culver; 43 Jack Fisher; 37 Wayne Granger; 44 Al Jackson; 46 Jim Maloney; 30 Jim Merritt; 38 Gary Nolan; 44 John Noriega; 33 Camilo Pascual; 34 José Peña; 22 Mel Queen; 34 Pedro Ramos; 42 Dennis Ribant; 42 Bill Short	Catchers: 5 Johnny Bench; 8 Danny Breeden; 7 Pat Corrales; Infielders: 12 Darrel Chaney; 19 Tommy Helms; 23 Lee May; 24 Tony Pérez; 15 Chico Ruiz; 17 Fred Whitfield; 6 Woody Woodward	Outfielders: 55 Jim Beauchamp; 29 Alex Johnson; 14 Pete Rose; 20 Ted Savage; 16 Jimmy Stewart; 28 Bobby Tolan; Other batters: 25 Bernie Carbo; 26 Mike de la Hoz; 21 Clyde Mashore	Manager: 4 Dave Bristol; Coaches: 10 Vern Benson; 2 Jim Bragan; 31 Harvey Haddix; 9 Hal Smith

== Player stats ==
= Indicates team leader

= Indicates league leader

=== Batting ===
==== Starters by position ====
Note: Pos = Position; G = Games played; AB = At bats; H = Hits; R = Runs; Avg. = Batting average; HR = Home runs; RBI = Runs batted in

Pos	Player	G	AB	R	H	Avg.	HR	RBI
C	Johnny Bench	148	532	83	156	.293	26	90
1B	Lee May	158	607	85	169	.278	38	110
2B	Tommy Helms	126	480	38	129	.269	1	40
SS	Woody Woodward	97	241	36	63	.261	0	15
3B	Tony Pérez	160	629	103	185	.294	37	122
LF	Alex Johnson	139	523	86	165	.315	17	88
CF	Bobby Tolan	152	637	104	194	.305	21	93
RF	Pete Rose	156	627	120*	218	.348	16	82

- Tied with Bobby Bonds

==== Other batters ====
Note: G = Games played; AB = At bats; H = Hits; Avg. = Batting average; HR = Home runs; RBI = Runs batted in

Player	G	AB	H	Avg.	HR	RBI
Jimmy Stewart	119	221	56	.253	4	24
Darrel Chaney	93	209	40	.191	0	15
Chico Ruiz	88	196	48	.245	0	13
Ted Savage	68	110	25	.227	2	11
Fred Whitfield	74	74	11	.149	1	8
Pat Corrales	29	72	19	.264	1	5
Jim Beauchamp	43	60	15	.250	1	8
Danny Breeden	3	8	1	.125	0	1
Bernie Carbo	4	3	0	.000	0	0
Mike de la Hoz	1	1	0	.000	0	0
Clyde Mashore	2	1	0	.000	0	0

=== Pitching ===
==== Starting pitchers ====
Note: G = Games pitched; IP = Innings pitched; W = Wins; L = Losses; ERA = Earned run average; SO = Strikeouts

Player	G	IP	W	L	ERA	SO
Jim Merritt	42	251.0	17	9	4.37	144
Tony Cloninger	35	189.2	11	17	5.03	103
Jim Maloney	30	178.2	12	5	2.77	102
Gary Nolan	16	108.2	8	8	3.56	83
Gerry Arrigo	20	91.0	4	7	4.15	35
Mel Queen	2	12.0	1	0	2.25	7

==== Other pitchers ====
Note: G = Games pitched; IP = Innings pitched; W = Wins; L = Losses; ERA = Earned run average; SO = Strikeouts

Player	G	IP	W	L	ERA	SO
Jack Fisher	34	113.0	4	4	5.50	55
George Culver	32	101.1	5	7	4.26	58
Camilo Pascual	5	7.1	0	0	8.59	3

==== Relief pitchers ====
Note: G = Games pitched; W = Wins; L = Losses; SV = Saves; ERA = Earned run average; SO = Strikeouts

Player	G	W	L	SV	ERA	SO
Wayne Granger	90	9	6	27	2.80	68
Clay Carroll	77	12	6	7	3.52	90
Pedro Ramos	38	4	3	2	5.16	40
Al Jackson	33	1	0	3	5.27	16
Dennis Ribant	7	0	0	0	1.08	7
José Peña	6	1	1	0	18.00	3
John Noriega	5	0	0	0	5.87	4
Bill Short	4	0	0	0	15.43	0

== Awards and honors ==
- Pete Rose, National League batting champion
- Pete Rose, Lou Gehrig Award
- Johnny Bench, Marathon Oil Cincinnati Reds Player of the Year

== Farm system ==
Level	Team	League	Manager
AAA	Indianapolis Indians	American Association	Vern Rapp
AA	Asheville Tourists	Southern League	Alex Cosmidis
A	Tampa Tarpons	Florida State League	Bunky Warren
A-Short Season	Sioux Falls Packers	Northern League	Jim Snyder
Rookie	GCL Reds	Gulf Coast League	George Scherger
