= Luis Peraza =

Puerto Rican baseball player (1942-2011)

- Pitcher
- Born: June 17, 1942; Rio Piedras, Puerto Rico
- Died: May 3, 2011 (aged 68); Caguas, Puerto Rico
- Batted: Right Threw: Right

MLB debut
- April 9, 1969, for the Philadelphia Phillies

Last MLB appearance
- July 4, 1969, for the Philadelphia Phillies

MLB statistics
- Win–loss record: 0–0
- Earned run average: 6.00
- Strikeouts: 7
- Stats at Baseball Reference

Teams
- Philadelphia Phillies (1969)

Luis Peraza Rios (June 17, 1942 – May 3, 2011) was a Puerto Rican Major League Baseball (MLB) pitcher. Peraza appeared in eight games, all in relief, for the Philadelphia Phillies in 1969. He threw and batted right-handed, stood 5 feet 11 inches (1.80 m) tall and weighed 185 pounds (84 kg).

Peraza's professional baseball career began in 1961 in the New York Yankees' organization, then it was interrupted for two seasons (1962–1963). In 1964, Peraza was signed by the Los Angeles Angels' system, pitching at the Class A level for all of 1964 through two games during 1965. Then he was out of pro ball until he was signed by the Phillies in 1967.

His eight-game MLB trial in 1969 consisted of nine total innings pitched. Peraza allowed 12 hits, six earned runs and two bases on balls, with seven strikeouts. He did not record a decision or a save.
