= Jerry Johnson (baseball) =

American baseball player (1943–2021)

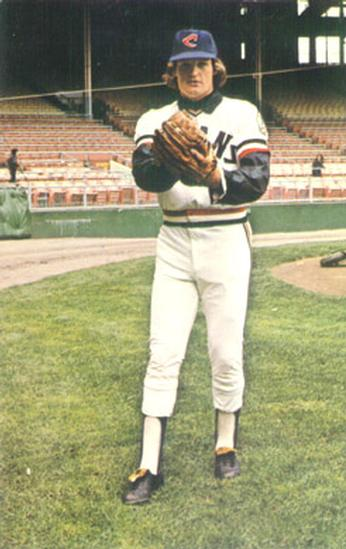
- Johnson in 1973
- Pitcher
- Born: December 3, 1943; Miami, Florida, U.S.
- Died: November 15, 2021 (aged 77); Canyon Lake, California, U.S.
- Batted: Right Threw: Right

MLB debut
- July 17, 1968, for the Philadelphia Phillies

Last MLB appearance
- September 29, 1977, for the Toronto Blue Jays

MLB statistics
- Win–loss record: 48–51
- Earned run average: 4.31
- Strikeouts: 489
- Saves: 41
- Stats at Baseball Reference

Teams
- Philadelphia Phillies (1968–1969); St. Louis Cardinals (1970); San Francisco Giants (1970–1972); Cleveland Indians (1973); Houston Astros (1974); San Diego Padres (1975–1976); Toronto Blue Jays (1977)

Jerry Michael Johnson (December 3, 1943 – November 15, 2021) was an American professional baseball pitcher. He played in Major League Baseball (MLB) with the Philadelphia Phillies, St. Louis Cardinals, San Francisco Giants, Cleveland Indians, Houston Astros, San Diego Padres, and Toronto Blue Jays.

== Career ==
=== Third baseman ===
Johnson was signed by the New York Mets as an amateur free agent third baseman in 1962. He batted .248 for their Western Carolina League affiliate, the Salisbury Braves in 1962, and committed seven errors in only 29 games for a .868 fielding percentage. He batted .238 with an .872 fielding percentage in 1963, and the Mets began experimenting with him on the mound. He made eleven pitching appearances for the California League's Salinas Mets that season, and had a 6.75 earned run average without a decision.

With an .870 fielding percentage in 1964, the notion of Johnson as a third baseman was abandoned, and he was converted to pitcher by the New York–Penn League's Auburn Mets.

Johnson pitched in the Mets minor league system through 1967.

Following the season, Johnson was obtained by the Philadelphia Phillies from the Mets in the 1967 minor league draft.

=== Philadelphia Phillies ===
Johnson made his major league debut on July 17, 1968 in the first game of a doubleheader against the Chicago Cubs at Shibe Park. He gave up two earned runs in one inning of the Phillies' 8–4 loss.

=== Curt Flood trade ===
Johnson spent two years with Philadelphia, before moving to the St. Louis Cardinals in a controversial transaction. On October 7, 1969, he was sent by Philadelphia along with Dick Allen and Cookie Rojas to the St. Louis Cardinals in the trade that brought Tim McCarver, Byron Browne, Joe Hoerner and Curt Flood to the Phillies. After Flood refused to report to his new team, St. Louis sent Willie Montañez and a minor leaguer to Philadelphia to complete the trade. Flood believed Major League Baseball's reserve clause was unfair and appealed his case to the U.S. Supreme Court. Although his legal challenge was unsuccessful, it brought solidarity among ballplayers as they fought against the reserve clause and sought free agency.

=== San Francisco Giants ===
He was 2–0 with a 3.18 ERA for the Cards when they dealt him mid-season to the San Francisco Giants for Frank Linzy. With the Giants, Johnson emerged as one of the top relievers in the National League, finishing sixth in Cy Young Award balloting during an era when such an honor was rare for relief pitchers. In 1971, Johnson went 12–9 with a 2.97 ERA and eighteen saves for the division winning Giants. In his only post-season, he pitched 1 1/3 innings and gave up two runs to the Pittsburgh Pirates in game four of the 1971 National League Championship Series.

=== Later career ===
During Spring training 1973, Johnson was selected off waivers by the Cleveland Indians. He was traded from the Indians to the Houston Astros for Cecil Upshaw at the Winter Meetings on December 3, 1973. He was released by the Astros at the end of the 1974 season, and signed with the San Diego Padres in 1975. After two seasons in San Diego, he was traded to the newly created Toronto Blue Jays for Dave Roberts, who had just been purchased by Toronto from the Padres. Johnson was the winning pitcher (as a reliever) in the first-ever Blue Jays game on April 7, 1977. Johnson went 2–4 with a 4.60 ERA in the Blue Jays' inaugural season, at the end of which he retired.

Following his major league career, Johnson played with the 1989 St. Lucie Legends of the Senior Professional Baseball Association.

Johnson died from complications of lewy body dementia, and COPD in 2021 at the age of 77.
