= Rich Barry =

American baseball player (1940–2021)

- Outfielder
- Born: September 12, 1940; Berkeley, California, U.S.
- Died: October 9, 2021 (aged 81)
- Batted: Right Threw: Right

MLB debut
- July 4, 1969, for the Philadelphia Phillies

Last MLB appearance
- August 19, 1969, for the Philadelphia Phillies

MLB statistics
- Batting average: .188
- Home runs: 0
- Runs scored: 4
- Stats at Baseball Reference

Teams
- Philadelphia Phillies (1969)

Richard Donovan Barry (September 12, 1940 – October 9, 2021) was an American professional baseball player who appeared in 20 games in Major League Baseball for the Philadelphia Phillies in 1969, primarily as an outfielder. The native of Berkeley, California, threw and batted right-handed, stood 6 feet 4 inches (1.93 m) tall and weighed 205 pounds (93 kg).

Originally signed by the New York Yankees in 1958 after graduating from Berkeley High School, Barry played 11 full seasons in the minor leagues before reaching the majors in early July 1969. He was a power hitter in the minors, slugging 280 career home runs and topping the 20-HR mark seven different times in his 15-year minor league career. During his midsummer 1969 trial with the Phillies, however, he had only 38 total plate appearances, no runs batted in, and one extra-base hit, a double. He retired after the 1972 season.

Barry died on October 9, 2021, at the age of 81.
