= Lowell Palmer =

American baseball player (born 1947)

- Pitcher
- Born: August 18, 1947 (age 78); Sacramento, California, U.S.
- Batted: Right Threw: Right

MLB debut
- June 21, 1969, for the Philadelphia Phillies

Last MLB appearance
- September 16, 1974, for the San Diego Padres

MLB statistics
- Win–loss record: 5–18
- Earned run average: 5.29
- Strikeouts: 239
- Stats at Baseball Reference

Teams
- Philadelphia Phillies (1969–1971); St. Louis Cardinals (1972); Cleveland Indians (1972); San Diego Padres (1974)

Lowell Raymond Palmer (born August 18, 1947) is an American former professional baseball pitcher who appeared in 106 games in Major League Baseball (MLB) as a member of four different teams over all or portions of five seasons (1969–1972 and 1974). Born in Sacramento, California, he threw and batted right-handed and was listed as 6 feet 1 inch (1.85 m) tall and 190 pounds (86 kg).

== Baseball career ==
Palmer graduated from Norte Del Rio High School and attended American River College, both in Sacramento. He was selected by the Philadelphia Phillies in the first round (sixth overall) of the 1966 Major League Baseball draft (secondary phase). Palmer was called up to the Phillies after posting a 36–17 won–lost record in 3 1/2 minor league seasons, with 534 strikeouts in 516 innings pitched.

=== Major leagues ===
He made his major league debut on June 21, 1969, with a starting assignment against the Pittsburgh Pirates at Connie Mack Stadium. He held Pittsburgh scoreless through the game's first six innings, but unraveled in the seventh and eighth innings, permitting five earned runs; he was tagged with the Phils' 8–2 defeat.

Palmer threw a three-hit, complete game and shutout in his third MLB appearance, against the Montreal Expos at Jarry Park Stadium on June 29, but overall he struggled to a 2–8 record in 1969, with a 5.20 earned run average, in 29 games during his rookie campaign. He would throw only one more complete game in his major-league career, that coming in his final season. In Palmer's MLB tenure as a member of the Phillies (1969–1971), St. Louis Cardinals (1972), Cleveland Indians (1972) and San Diego Padres (1974), he posted a career record of 5–18; his earned run average for in his 106 career MLB appearances (with 25 starts) was 5.29.

One of his main problems was wildness, as he walked a total of 202 batters in just 3162/3 innings pitched. His BB/9IP was 5.74, much higher than the major league average at that time. He was fourth in the National League with 14 wild pitches in 1970, and eighth in the league with 10 wild pitches in 1974. He also hit seven batters in 1974, ranking third in the league. As a power pitcher, however, he struck out 239 batters, giving him a K/9IP of 6.79, which was higher than the major league average. Including his career walks, hit batsmen (23), and hits allowed (302), Palmer gave up a total of 527 baserunners in his 3162/3 innings pitched. His final pro season was 1977.
