= Leroy Reams =

American baseball player (born 1943)

- Pinch hitter
- Born: August 11, 1942; Pine Bluff, Arkansas, U.S.
- Died: July 14, 2026 (aged 83)
- Batted: Left Threw: Right

MLB debut
- May 7, 1969, for the Philadelphia Phillies

Last MLB appearance
- May 7, 1969, for the Philadelphia Phillies

MLB statistics
- Games: 1
- At bats: 1
- Hits: 0: Philadelphia Phillies (1969)
- Stats at Baseball Reference

Leroy Reams (August 11, 1942 – July 14, 2026) was an American former professional baseball player.

An outfielder, first baseman and third baseman by trade, he had a nine-year pro career but appeared in only one Major League game as a pinch hitter for the Philadelphia Phillies on May 7, 1969. Batting for Barry Lersch in the eighth inning of a game at Connie Mack Stadium against the Houston Astros, Reams struck out against Larry Dierker, who pitched a five-hit, 14-strikeout 6–1 victory against Reams' Phillies.

Born in Pine Bluff, Arkansas, Reams attended Castlemont High School in Oakland, California. He batted left-handed, threw right-handed and was listed as 6 feet 2 inches (1.88 m) tall and 175 pounds (79 kg).

Reams signed with the New York Yankees in 1961 and, after two seasons with Idaho Falls of the Pioneer League, he was selected ay Phillies in the 1963 minor-league draft. Most of his career was spent at the Double-A level. After his one game in the big leagues, Reams spent the rest of 1969 with the Double-A Reading Phillies and Triple-A Eugene Emeralds. He retired after the 1970 season, and after playing in 954 minor league games.
