= 1969 Pittsburgh Pirates season =

1969 Pittsburgh Pirates
- League: National League
- Division: East
- Ballpark: Forbes Field
- City: Pittsburgh, Pennsylvania
- Owners: John W. Galbreath (majority shareholder); Bing Crosby, Thomas P. Johnson (minority shareholders)
- General managers: Joe L. Brown
- Managers: Larry Shepard, Alex Grammas
- Television: KDKA-TV; Bob Prince, Jim Woods, Nellie King
- Radio: KDKA; Bob Prince, Jim Woods, Nellie King

The 1969 Pittsburgh Pirates season was a season in American baseball. It consisted of the Pirates finishing in third place in the newly established National League East, twelve games behind the eventual World Series champion New York Mets. The Pirates were managed by Larry Shepard, and played their home games at Forbes Field, which was in its final full season of operation, before moving into their new facility in the middle of the following season. This was also the final full season they wore the vest style uniforms, they would don pull over uniforms when they moved into Three Rivers Stadium midway through the next season.

== Offseason ==
- October 14, 1968: Manny Mota was drafted from the Pirates by the Montreal Expos as the 2nd pick in the 1968 MLB expansion draft.
- October 14, 1968: Donn Clendenon was drafted from the Pirates by the Montreal Expos as the 11th pick in the 1968 MLB expansion draft.
- October 14, 1968: Maury Wills was drafted from the Pirates by the Montreal Expos as the 21st pick in the 1968 MLB expansion draft.
- October 14, 1968: Dave Roberts was drafted from the Pirates by the San Diego Padres as the 39th pick in the 1968 MLB expansion draft.
- October 14, 1968: Al McBean was drafted from the Pirates by the San Diego Padres as the 50th pick in the 1968 MLB expansion draft.
- October 14, 1968: Ron Slocum was drafted from the Pirates by the San Diego Padres as the 55th pick in the 1968 MLB expansion draft.
- October 16, 1968: George Spriggs was sold by the Pirates to the Kansas City Royals.
- October 21, 1968: Dave Wickersham was sold by the Pirates to the Kansas City Royals.
- January 15, 1969: Manny Jiménez was traded by the Pirates to the Chicago Cubs for Joe Campbell and Chuck Hartenstein.
- February 12, 1969: Rennie Stennett was signed by the Pirates as a non-drafted free agent.
- March 28, 1969: Tommie Sisk and Chris Cannizzaro were traded by the Pirates to the San Diego Padres for Ron Davis and Bobby Klaus.
- March 30, 1969: Omar Moreno was signed by the Pirates as a non-drafted free agent.

== Regular season ==
- August 6, 1969: Willie Stargell hit a home run out of Dodger Stadium.
- September 20, 1969: Bob Moose no-hits the eventual world champion New York Mets, 4-0 at Shea Stadium.

=== Season standings ===
NL East
Team	W	L	Pct.	GB	Home	Road
New York Mets	100	62	.617	—	52‍–‍30	48‍–‍32
Chicago Cubs	92	70	.568	8	49‍–‍32	43‍–‍38
Pittsburgh Pirates	88	74	.543	12	47‍–‍34	41‍–‍40
St. Louis Cardinals	87	75	.537	13	42‍–‍38	45‍–‍37
Philadelphia Phillies	63	99	.389	37	30‍–‍51	33‍–‍48
Montreal Expos	52	110	.321	48	24‍–‍57	28‍–‍53

=== Record vs. opponents ===
1969 National League record Sources:
Team	ATL	CHC	CIN	HOU	LAD	MON	NYM	PHI	PIT	SD	SF	STL
Atlanta	—	3–9	12–6	15–3	9–9	8–4	4–8	6–6	8–4	13–5	9–9	6–6
Chicago	9–3	—	6–6–1	8–4	6–6	10–8	8–10	12–6	7–11	11–1	6–6	9–9
Cincinnati	6–12	6–6–1	—	9–9	10–8	8–4	6–6	10–2	5–7	11–7	10–8	8–4
Houston	3–15	4–8	9–9	—	6–12	11–1	10–2	8–4	3–9	10–8	10–8	7–5
Los Angeles	9–9	6–6	8–10	12–6	—	10–2	4–8	8–4	8–4	12–6	5–13	3–9
Montreal	4–8	8–10	4–8	1–11	2–10	—	5–13	11–7	5–13	4–8	1–11	7–11
New York	8–4	10–8	6–6	2–10	8–4	13–5	—	12–6	10–8	11–1	8–4	12–6
Philadelphia	6-6	6–12	2–10	4–8	4–8	7–11	6–12	—	10–8	8–4	3–9	7–11
Pittsburgh	4–8	11–7	7–5	9–3	4–8	13–5	8–10	8–10	—	10–2	5–7	9–9
San Diego	5–13	1–11	7–11	8–10	6–12	8–4	1–11	4–8	2–10	—	6–12	4–8
San Francisco	9–9	6–6	8–10	8–10	13–5	11–1	4–8	9–3	7–5	12–6	—	3–9
St. Louis	6–6	9–9	4–8	5–7	9–3	11–7	6–12	11–7	9–9	8–4	9–3	—

=== Detailed records ===
National League
Opponent	W	L	WP	RS	RA
NL East
Chicago Cubs	11	7	0.611	83	69
Montreal Expos	13	5	0.722	88	56
New York Mets	8	10	0.444	74	68
Philadelphia Phillies	8	10	0.444	86	90
**Pittsburgh Pirates**					
St. Louis Cardinals	9	9	0.500	56	73
Total	49	41	0.544	387	356
NL West
Atlanta Braves	4	8	0.333	48	53
Cincinnati Reds	7	5	0.583	68	55
Houston Astros	9	3	0.750	70	47
Los Angeles Dodgers	4	8	0.333	43	60
San Diego Padres	10	2	0.833	64	31
San Francisco Giants	5	7	0.417	45	50
Total	39	33	0.542	338	296
Season Total	88	74	0.543	725	652

Month	Games	Won	Lost	Win %	RS	RA
April	21	13	8	0.619	89	82
May	26	11	15	0.423	108	120
June	29	14	15	0.483	143	128
July	27	15	12	0.556	106	113
August	27	17	10	0.630	136	100
September	30	16	14	0.533	130	103
October	2	2	0	1.000	13	6
Total	162	88	74	0.543	725	652

	Games	Won	Lost	Win %	RS	RA
Home	81	47	34	0.580	324	322
Away	81	41	40	0.506	401	330
Total	162	88	74	0.543	725	652

=== Game log ===
1969 Game Log: 88–74 (Home: 47–34; Away: 41–40)
April: 13–8 (Home: 9–4; Away: 4–4)

#	Date	Opponent	Score	Win	Loss	Save	Attendance	Record
1	April 8	@ Cardinals	6–2 (14)	**Dal Canton** (1–0)	Nelson	**Hartenstein** (1)	38,163	1–0
2	April 9	@ Cardinals	6–1	**Veale** (1–0)	Briles	—	10,739	2–0
3	April 10	@ Cardinals	3–2	**Ellis** (1–0)	Washburn	—	10,283	3–0
4	April 11	Phillies	7–1	**Moose** (1–0)	Johnson	—	31,641	4–0
5	April 12	Phillies	1–8	Jackson	**Bunning** (0–1)	—	12,474	4–1
6	April 13	Phillies	6–5	**Kline** (1–0)	Wilson	—	14,981	5–1
7	April 14	@ Cubs	0–4	Holtzman	**Veale** (1–1)	—	3,114	5–2
8	April 15	@ Cubs	4–7	Aguirre	**Ellis** (1–1)	Abernathy	4,362	5–3
9	April 16	Mets	11–3	**Moose** (2–0)	Koosman	—	7,666	6–3
10	April 17	Mets	4–0	**Bunning** (1–1)	Cardwell	**Kline** (1)	8,097	7–3
11	April 19	@ Phillies	8–6	**Blass** (1–0)	Jackson	**Dal Canton** (1)	3,953	8–3
12	April 20	@ Phillies	1–7	Wise	**Veale** (1–2)	Lersch	4,930	8–4
13	April 22	Cubs	7–5	**Hartenstein** (1–0)	Hands	—		9–4
14	April 22	Cubs	6–5	**Dal Canton** (2–0)	Nye	**Kline** (2)	7,906	10–4
15	April 23	@ Mets	0–2	Koosman	**Bunning** (1–2)	—	7,274	10–5
16	April 25	Expos	8–2	**Blass** (2–0)	Morton	**Hartenstein** (2)	10,947	11–5
17	April 26	Expos	4–3	**Veale** (2–2)	Stoneman	**Hartenstein** (3)	8,372	12–5
18	April 27	Expos	2–4	Jaster	**Ellis** (1–2)	—	24,425	12–6
19	April 28	Cardinals	2–6	Carlton	**Moose** (2–1)	—	3,859	12–7
20	April 30	Cardinals	2–1	**Bunning** (2–2)	Giusti	—		13–7
21	April 30	Cardinals	1–8	Gibson	**Blass** (2–1)	—	10,895	13–8

May: 11–15 (Home: 4–7; Away: 7–8)

#	Date	Opponent	Score	Win	Loss	Save	Attendance	Record
22	May 1	Cardinals	3–9	Briles	**Veale** (2–3)	—	7,043	13–9
23	May 2	@ Expos	7–3	**Ellis** (2–2)	Jaster	—	11,892	14–9
24	May 3	@ Expos	4–2	**Moose** (3–1)	Morton	**Hartenstein** (4)	14,147	15–9
25	May 4	@ Expos	4–6	Face	**Kline** (1–1)	—	16,931	15–10
26	May 6	Padres	2–4	Kelley	**Blass** (2–2)	Reberger	5,793	15–11
27	May 7	Padres	2–0	**Veale** (3–3)	Kirby	**Hartenstein** (5)	4,189	16–11
28	May 9	Dodgers	3–13	Singer	**Ellis** (2–3)	Moeller	6,837	16–12
29	May 10	Dodgers	1–4	Sutton	**Bunning** (2–3)	Brewer	4,979	16–13
30	May 12	Giants	4–3	**Hartenstein** (2–0)	Gibbon	—	3,396	17–13
31	May 13	Giants	8–11	Herbel	**Moose** (3–2)	Linzy	5,846	17–14
32	May 14	Giants	0–3	Marichal	**Bunning** (2–4)	—	8,296	17–15
33	May 16	@ Dodgers	3–4	Brewer	**Kline** (1–2)	—	19,016	17–16
34	May 17	@ Dodgers	0–6	Osteen	**Ellis** (2–4)	—	50,120	17–17
35	May 18	@ Dodgers	5–6	Brewer	**Ramos** (0–1)	—	21,086	17–18
36	May 20	@ Padres	6–3	**Bunning** (3–4)	Niekro	**Hartenstein** (6)	4,947	18–18
37	May 21	@ Padres	11–1	**Moose** (4–2)	Sisk	—	34,334	19–18
38	May 22	@ Padres	7–1	**Blass** (3–2)	Kirby	—	4,001	20–18
39	May 23	@ Giants	0–3	Robertson	**Ellis** (2–5)	—	8,217	20–19
40	May 24	@ Giants	2–5	McCormick	**Veale** (3–4)	—	18,616	20–20
41	May 25	@ Giants	2–1	**Bunning** (4–4)	Perry	—		21–20
42	May 25	@ Giants	6–2	**Moose** (5–2)	Sadecki	**Dal Canton** (2)	24,041	22–20
43	May 28	@ Reds	6–7	Carroll	**Kline** (1–3)	—	7,458	22–21
44	May 29	@ Reds	4–10	Merritt	**Veale** (3–5)	—	8,161	22–22
45	May 30	Astros	9–3	**Bunning** (5–4)	Lemaster	—		23–22
46	May 30	Astros	6–9	Billingham	**Hartenstein** (2–1)	Gladding	18,381	23–23
47	May 31	Astros	3–1	**Ellis** (3–5)	Ray	**Kline** (3)	6,663	24–23

June: 14–15 (Home: 7–4; Away: 7–11)

#	Date	Opponent	Score	Win	Loss	Save	Attendance	Record
48	June 1	Astros	14–7	**Blass** (4–2)	Wilson	—	21,023	25–23
49	June 3	Reds	3–7	Merritt	**Veale** (3–6)	—	4,576	25–24
50	June 4	Reds	3–5	Carroll	**Hartenstein** (2–2)	Granger	6,685	25–25
51	June 6	@ Braves	1–3	Niekro	**Ellis** (3–6)	—	17,049	25–26
52	June 7	@ Braves	10–2	**Blass** (5–2)	Jarvis	—	21,120	26–26
53	June 8	@ Braves	10–11	Niekro	**Hartenstein** (2–3)	—		26–27
54	June 8	@ Braves	3–4	Pappas	**Veale** (3–7)	—	27,318	26–28
55	June 10	@ Astros	4–7	Griffin	**Ellis** (3–7)	—	14,660	26–29
56	June 11	@ Astros	13–8	**Blass** (6–2)	Guinn	**Hartenstein** (7)	15,871	27–29
57	June 12	@ Astros	4–3	**Bunning** (6–4)	Gladding	—	14,260	28–29
58	June 13	Braves	2–1 (10)	**Dal Canton** (3–0)	Pappas	—	11,610	29–29
59	June 14	Braves	4–2	**Moose** (6–2)	Upshaw	—	18,283	30–29
60	June 15	Braves	4–6	Reed	**Blass** (6–3)	Upshaw	19,974	30–30
61	June 16	Cubs	9–8	**Dal Canton** (4–0)	Regan	**Blass** (1)	8,810	31–30
62	June 17	Cubs	1–0	**Veale** (4–7)	Jenkins	**Dal Canton** (3)		32–30
63	June 17	Cubs	4–3	**Blass** (7–3)	Abernathy	—	26,817	33–30
64	June 18	Cubs	3–2 (10)	**Gibbon** (1–0)	Regan	—	12,198	34–30
65	June 20	@ Phillies	7–8	Wilson	**Marone** (0–1)	Boozer	10,669	34–31
66	June 21	@ Phillies	8–2	**Dal Canton** (5–0)	Palmer	—	5,469	35–31
67	June 22	@ Phillies	6–0	**Ellis** (4–7)	Champion	—		36–31
68	June 22	@ Phillies	2–3	Jackson	**Blass** (7–4)	—	33,712	36–32
69	June 23	@ Cubs	4–5	Regan	**Dal Canton** (5–1)	—	12,500	36–33
70	June 24	@ Cubs	2–3	Hands	**Bunning** (6–5)	—	17,530	36–34
71	June 25	@ Cubs	2–5	Jenkins	**Veale** (4–8)	—	26,434	36–35
72	June 26	@ Cubs	5–7 (10)	Regan	**Dal Canton** (5–2)	—	29,473	36–36
73	June 27	@ Mets	3–1	**Blass** (8–4)	Koosman	**Gibbon** (1)	42,276	37–36
74	June 28	@ Mets	7–4	**Bunning** (7–5)	Gentry	**Gibbon** (2)	48,398	38–36
75	June 29	@ Mets	3–7	Seaver	**Veale** (4–9)	—	27,455	38–37
76	June 30	Phillies	2–4	Fryman	**Ellis** (4–8)	Boozer	17,954	38–38

July: 15–12 (Home: 12–7; Away: 3–5)

#	Date	Opponent	Score	Win	Loss	Save	Attendance	Record
77	July 1	Phillies	4–7	Jackson	**Blass** (8–5)	Wilson	6,652	38–39
78	July 2	Phillies	4–14	Raffo	**Bunning** (7–6)	Boozer	6,322	38–40
79	July 4	Mets	6–11	Seaver	**Veale** (4–10)	Koonce		38–41
80	July 4	Mets	2–9	Cardwell	**Ellis** (4–9)	DiLauro	17,631	38–42
81	July 6	Mets	7–8	Taylor	**Hartenstein** (2–4)	Koonce	11,552	38–43
82	July 8	Expos	8–1	**Blass** (9–5)	Wegener	—	4,930	39–43
83	July 9	Expos	4–3 (10)	**Gibbon** (2–0)	Radatz	—		40–43
84	July 9	Expos	3–2	**Ellis** (5–9)	Reed	**Gibbon** (3)	9,372	41–43
85	July 10	Expos	2–1 (11)	**Hartenstein** (3–4)	McGinn	—	4,982	42–43
86	July 11	@ Cardinals	1–6	Carlton	**Walker** (0–1)	—	24,910	42–44
87	July 12	@ Cardinals	3–6	Washburn	**Blass** (9–6)	—	17,950	42–45
88	July 13	@ Cardinals	3–0	**Bunning** (8–6)	Gibson	**Moose** (1)		43–45
89	July 13	@ Cardinals	2–4	Briles	**Ellis** (5–10)	Hoerner	36,469	43–46
90	July 14	@ Expos	0–2	Stoneman	**Veale** (4–11)	—	20,054	43–47
91	July 15	@ Expos	9–3	**Walker** (1–1)	Waslewski	—	20,876	44–47
92	July 16	@ Expos	8–7	**Gibbon** (3–0)	McGinn	**Hartenstein** (8)	24,214	45–47
93	July 17	@ Expos	4–5	Shaw	**Bunning** (8–7)	—	11,935	45–48
94	July 18	Cardinals	4–1	**Ellis** (6–10)	Gibson	—	13,666	46–48
95	July 19	Cardinals	3–2	**Veale** (5–11)	Briles	**Gibbon** (4)	8,915	47–48
96	July 24	Padres	4–3 (10)	**Ellis** (7–10)	Ross	—	6,206	48–48
97	July 25	Padres	2–3	Niekro	**Blass** (9–7)	—	7,404	48–49
98	July 26	Padres	4–3 (10)	**Moose** (7–2)	McCool	—	6,769	49–49
99	July 27	Padres	4–1	**Bunning** (9–7)	Kirby	**Moose** (2)	14,888	50–49
100	July 29	Dodgers	4–2 (10)	**Gibbon** (4–0)	McBean	—		51–49
101	July 29	Dodgers	5–6	Mikkelsen	**Ellis** (7–11)	—	18,436	51–50
102	July 30	Dodgers	4–2	**Blass** (10–7)	Osteen	—	8,833	52–50
103	July 31	Dodgers	2–1 (15)	**Hartenstein** (4–4)	McBean	—	8,605	53–50

August: 17–10 (Home: 7–5; Away: 10–5)

#	Date	Opponent	Score	Win	Loss	Save	Attendance	Record
104	August 1	Giants	1–5	McCormick	**Bunning** (9–8)	—	10,500	53–51
105	August 2	Giants	7–3	**Veale** (6–11)	Marichal	—	12,566	54–51
106	August 3	Giants	2–3	Perry	**Ellis** (7–12)	—	14,841	54–52
107	August 5	@ Dodgers	11–3	**Blass** (11–7)	Foster	—	22,604	55–52
108	August 6	@ Dodgers	5–7	Sutton	**Walker** (1–2)	Brewer	18,347	55–53
109	August 7	@ Dodgers	0–6	Osteen	**Bunning** (9–9)	—	20,475	55–54
110	August 8	@ Padres	7–1	**Veale** (7–11)	Niekro	—	6,061	56–54
111	August 10	@ Padres	7–5	**Ellis** (8–12)	Kelley	**Gibbon** (5)		57–54
112	August 10	@ Padres	8–6	**Blass** (12–7)	Kirby	**Gibbon** (6)	10,073	58–54
113	August 12	@ Giants	3–6	Perry	**Walker** (1–3)	—	5,496	58–55
114	August 13	@ Giants	10–5	**Bunning** (10–9)	McCormick	**Moose** (3)	5,966	59–55
115	August 15	@ Reds	5–1	**Veale** (8–11)	Nolan	—	21,314	60–55
116	August 16	@ Reds	2–5	Merritt	**Ellis** (8–13)	—	13,218	60–56
117	August 17	@ Reds	8–5	**Blass** (13–7)	Fisher	**Hartenstein** (9)	20,732	61–56
118	August 18	@ Reds	12–5 (10)	**Dal Canton** (6–2)	Granger	—	16,657	62–56
119	August 19	Astros	5–1	**Walker** (2–3)	Wilson	**Gibbon** (7)	5,409	63–56
120	August 20	Astros	1–0	**Veale** (9–11)	Lemaster	—	10,563	64–56
121	August 22	Reds	8–2	**Ellis** (9–13)	Fisher	—		65–56
122	August 22	Reds	5–3	**Dal Canton** (7–2)	Carroll	—	28,184	66–56
123	August 23	Reds	3–1	**Moose** (8–2)	Arrigo	**Hartenstein** (10)	16,283	67–56
124	August 24	Reds	9–4	**Veale** (10–11)	Maloney	**Dal Canton** (4)	16,506	68–56
125	August 26	Braves	4–6	Reed	**Walker** (2–4)	Doyle	15,449	68–57
126	August 27	Braves	0–1	Niekro	**Ellis** (9–14)	—	11,454	68–58
127	August 28	Braves	2–8	Stone	**Blass** (13–8)	Doyle	10,767	68–59
128	August 29	@ Astros	4–2 (10)	**Moose** (9–2)	Bouton	—	20,405	69–59
129	August 30	@ Astros	1–2	Dierker	**Belinsky** (0–1)	—	27,747	69–60
130	August 31	@ Astros	6–4	**Marone** (1–1)	Gladding	**Blass** (2)	24,722	70–60

September: 16–14 (Home: 6–7; Away: 10–7)

#	Date	Opponent	Score	Win	Loss	Save	Attendance	Record
131	September 1	@ Braves	7–1	**Moose** (10–2)	Britton	—	10,479	71–60
132	September 3	@ Braves	1–8	Reed	**Ellis** (9–15)	Upshaw	6,317	71–61
133	September 5	@ Cubs	9–2	**Blass** (14–8)	Holtzman	—	10,411	72–61
134	September 6	@ Cubs	13–4	**Veale** (11–11)	Jenkins	—	24,566	73–61
135	September 7	@ Cubs	7–5 (11)	**Dal Canton** (8–2)	Johnson	—	28,698	74–61
136	September 8	@ Expos	6–2	**Hartenstein** (5–4)	Raymond	**Dal Canton** (5)	9,526	75–61
137	September 9	@ Expos	2–4	Renko	**Walker** (2–5)	—	9,129	75–62
138	September 10	Cardinals	2–11	Gibson	**Blass** (14–9)	—		75–63
139	September 10	Cardinals	1–2	Torrez	**Belinsky** (0–2)	Grant	11,898	75–64
140	September 11	Cardinals	3–2	**Veale** (12–11)	Carlton	—	4,579	76–64
141	September 12	Mets	0–1	Koosman	**Moose** (10–3)	—		76–65
142	September 12	Mets	0–1	Cardwell	**Ellis** (9–16)	McGraw	19,303	76–66
143	September 13	Mets	2–5	Seaver	**Walker** (2–6)	—	10,440	76–67
144	September 14	Mets	5–3	**Blass** (15–9)	Ryan	—	11,324	77–67
145	September 15	@ Phillies	1–2	Wise	**Veale** (12–12)	—		77–68
146	September 15	@ Phillies	3–4	James	**Belinsky** (0–3)	—	2,933	77–69
147	September 16	@ Phillies	9–5	**Moose** (11–3)	Fryman	**Gibbon** (8)	1,169	78–69
148	September 17	@ Cardinals	4–2	**Ellis** (10–16)	Taylor	—	11,646	79–69
149	September 18	@ Cardinals	7–8	Campisi	**Gibbon** (4–1)	—	8,612	79–70
150	September 19	@ Mets	8–2	**Veale** (13–12)	Ryan	—		80–70
151	September 19	@ Mets	8–0	**Walker** (3–6)	McAndrew	—	51,885	81–70
152	September 20	@ Mets	4–0	**Moose** (12–3)	Gentry	—	38,784	82–70
153	September 21	@ Mets	3–5	Koosman	**Ellis** (10–17)	—		82–71
154	September 21	@ Mets	1–6	Cardwell	**Blass** (15–10)	—	55,901	82–72
155	September 23	Phillies	3–4	Jackson	**Veale** (13–13)	Johnson	2,364	82–73
156	September 25	Phillies	5–3	**Walker** (4–6)	Wise	—		83–73
157	September 25	Phillies	9–7	**Moose** (13–3)	James	**Gibbon** (9)	2,379	84–73
158	September 26	Cubs	2–0	**Ellis** (11–17)	Jenkins	—	4,973	85–73
159	September 27	Cubs	4–1	**Blass** (16–10)	Holtzman	**Moose** (4)	4,157	86–73
160	September 28	Cubs	1–3	Hands	**Veale** (13–14)	—	24,435	86–74

October: 2–0 (Home: 2–0; Away: 0–0)

#	Date	Opponent	Score	Win	Loss	Save	Attendance	Record
161	October 1	Expos	5–4	**Gibbon** (5–1)	Reed	—	2,496	87–74
162	October 2	Expos	8–2	**Moose** (14–3)	Robertson	—	2,700	88–74

Legend: = Win = Loss
Bold = Pirates team member

=== Opening Day lineup ===
Opening Day Starters
#	Name	Position
18	Matty Alou	CF
20	Richie Hebner	3B
21	Roberto Clemente	RF
8	Willie Stargell	LF
25	Bob Robertson	1B
9	Bill Mazeroski	2B
12	Jerry May	C
2	Freddie Patek	SS
28	Steve Blass	SP

=== Notable transactions ===
- May 17, 1969: Jim Shellenback was traded by the Pirates to the Washington Senators in exchange for Frank Kreutzer.
- June 5, 1969: Pedro Ramos was released by the Pirates.
- June 10, 1969: Ron Kline was traded by the Pirates to the San Francisco Giants for Joe Gibbon.
- July 16, 1969: Kent Tekulve was signed by the Pirates as a non-drafted free agent.
- July 30, 1969: Bo Belinsky was purchased by the Pirates from the California Angels.
- August 15, 1969: Jim Bunning was traded by the Pirates to the Los Angeles Dodgers for Ron Mitchell, Chuck Goggin and cash.
- September 26, 1969: Manager Larry Shepard fired by the Pirates. Alex Grammas named interim manager for the final five games.

=== Roster ===
1969 Pittsburgh Pirates
**Roster**
**Pitchers**: 25 Bo Belinsky; 28 Steve Blass; 45 Frank Brosseau; 14 Jim Bunning; 43 Bruce Dal Canton; 40 Dock Ellis; 24 Gene Garber; 19 Joe Gibbon; 42 Chuck Hartenstein; 27 Ron Kline; 29 Lou Marone; 38 Bob Moose; 19,29 Pedro Ramos; 19 Jim Shellenback; 39 Bob Veale; 23 Luke Walker	**Catchers**: 10 Gary Kolb; 12 Jerry May; 35 Manny Sanguillén; **Infielders**: 22 Gene Alley; 30 Dave Cash; 20 Richie Hebner; 15 José Martínez; 9 Bill Mazeroski; 16 Al Oliver; 11 José Pagán; 2 Freddie Patek; 25,27 Bob Robertson	**Outfielders**: 18 Matty Alou; 21 Roberto Clemente; 3 Ron Davis; 14 Johnny Jeter; 31 Ángel Mangual; 8 Willie Stargell; 44 Carl Taylor	**Manager**: 5 Alex Grammas; 7 Larry Shepard; **Coaches**: 5 Alex Grammas; 32 Vern Law; 6 Don Leppert; 4 Bill Virdon

== Statistics ==
= Indicates team leader

= Indicates league leader

Batting

Note: G = Games played; AB = At bats; H = Hits; Avg. = Batting average; HR = Home runs; RBI = Runs batted in

Regular Season
Player	G	AB	H	Avg.	HR	RBI
Carl Taylor	104	221	77	0.348	4	33
Roberto Clemente	138	507	175	0.345	19	91
Matty Alou	162	698	231	0.331	1	48
Johnny Jeter	28	29	9	0.310	1	6
Willie Stargell	145	522	160	0.307	29	92
Manny Sanguillen	129	459	139	0.303	5	57
Richie Hebner	129	459	138	0.301	8	47
Bruce Dal Canton	57	10	3	0.300	0	2
Al Oliver	129	463	132	0.285	17	70
Jose Pagan	108	274	78	0.285	9	42
Dave Cash	18	61	17	0.279	0	4
Jose Martinez	77	168	45	0.268	1	16
Steve Blass	44	84	21	0.250	1	9
Angel Mangual	6	4	1	0.250	0	0
Gene Alley	82	285	70	0.246	8	32
Freddie Patek	147	460	110	0.239	5	32
Ron Davis	62	64	15	0.234	0	4
Jerry May	62	190	44	0.232	7	23
Bill Mazeroski	67	227	52	0.229	3	25
Bob Robertson	32	96	20	0.208	1	9
Dock Ellis	37	68	6	0.088	0	1
Gary Kolb	29	37	3	0.081	0	3
Bob Moose	44	53	4	0.075	0	1
Chuck Hartenstein	56	14	1	0.071	0	0
Bob Veale	34	79	4	0.051	0	2
Jim Bunning	25	47	2	0.043	0	1
Bo Belinsky	8	2	0	0.000	0	0
Gene Garber	2	1	0	0.000	0	0
Joe Gibbon	35	5	0	0.000	0	0
Ron Kline	20	5	0	0.000	0	0
Pedro Ramos	5	1	0	0.000	0	0
Jim Shellenback	8	1	0	0.000	0	0
Luke Walker	31	32	0	0.000	0	1
Frank Brosseau	2	0	0	—	0	0
Lou Marone	29	0	0	—	0	0
Team totals	162	5,626	1,557	0.277	119	651

Pitching

Note: G = Games pitched; IP = Innings pitched; W = Wins; L = Losses; ERA = Earned run average; SO = Strikeouts

Regular Season
Player	G	IP	W	L	ERA	SO
Joe Gibbon	35	51 1/3	5	1	1.93	35
Lou Marone	29	35 1/3	1	1	2.55	25
Bob Moose	44	170	14	3	2.91	165
Bob Veale	34	225 2/3	13	14	3.23	213
Jim Shellenback	8	16 2/3	0	0	3.24	7
Bruce Dal Canton	57	86 1/3	8	2	3.34	56
Dock Ellis	35	218 2/3	11	17	3.58	173
Luke Walker	31	118 2/3	4	6	3.64	96
Jim Bunning	25	156	10	9	3.81	124
Chuck Hartenstein	56	95 2/3	5	4	3.95	44
Steve Blass	38	210	16	10	4.46	147
Bo Belinsky	8	17 2/3	0	3	4.58	15
Gene Garber	2	5	0	0	5.40	3
Ron Kline	20	31	1	3	5.81	15
Pedro Ramos	5	6	0	1	6.00	4
Frank Brosseau	2	1 2/3	0	0	10.80	2
Team totals	162	1,445 2/3	88	74	3.61	1,124

== Farm system ==
Level	Team	League	Manager
AAA	Columbus Jets	International League	Don Hoak
AA	York Pirates	Eastern League	Joe Morgan
A	Salem Rebels	Carolina League	Chuck Hiller
A	Gastonia Pirates	Western Carolinas League	Frank Oceak
A-Short Season	Geneva Pirates	New York–Penn League	Bob Clear
Rookie	GCL Pirates	Gulf Coast League	Buddy Pritchard

LEAGUE CHAMPIONS: York
