= Terry McDermott (baseball) =

American baseball player (born 1951)

- First baseman
- Born: March 20, 1951 (age 75); Rockville Centre, New York, U.S.
- Batted: Right Threw: Right

MLB debut
- September 12, 1972, for the Los Angeles Dodgers

Last MLB appearance
- September 26, 1972, for the Los Angeles Dodgers

MLB statistics
- Batting average: .130
- At bats: 23
- Hits: 3
- Stats at Baseball Reference

Teams
- Los Angeles Dodgers (1972)

Terrance Michael McDermott (born March 20, 1951) is an American former first baseman in Major League Baseball. He was drafted by the Los Angeles Dodgers in the 1st round of the 1969 MLB Draft and played in nine games for them during the 1972 baseball season.

Following his playing days, McDermott was a popular sports broadcaster in Albuquerque at KGGM-TV from 1980 to 1985 and then KOAT-TV from 1985 to 1997. He later became a spokesman for Intel in Albuquerque.
