= Dave Watkins (baseball) =

American baseball player and physician (born 1944)

- Catcher
- Born: March 15, 1944 (age 82); Owensboro, Kentucky, U.S.
- Batted: Right Threw: Right

MLB debut
- April 9, 1969, for the Philadelphia Phillies

Last MLB appearance
- October 2, 1969, for the Philadelphia Phillies

MLB statistics
- Batting average: .176
- Home runs: 4
- Runs batted in: 12
- Stats at Baseball Reference

Teams
- Philadelphia Phillies (1969)

David Roger Watkins (born March 15, 1944) is an American retired physician and former professional baseball player. The native of Owensboro, Kentucky, attended Owensboro High School and was a catcher who played in Major League Baseball (MLB) for the Philadelphia Phillies in 1969. After his seven-year professional baseball career, Watkins matriculated from Kentucky Wesleyan College with a Bachelor's degree in biology in 1972, then earned his medical degree from the University of Louisville School of Medicine in 1976. Based in Louisville, Watkins is a former medical director of the Prauer Rehabilitation and Neuroscience Institute, partner with Rehab Associates PSC, and physician advisor at Jewish Hospital. He was a board member of the U.S. Marine Hospital Foundation, the Greater Louisville Medical Society, and the trustees of the Kentucky Medical Association Political Action Committee. In 2009, he received the Greater Louisville Medical Society's Excellence in Citizenship Award.

Watkins' baseball career began in 1963 when he was signed by the Detroit Tigers. The catcher threw and batted right-handed, and was listed as 5 feet 10 inches (1.78 m) tall and 185 pounds (84 kg). He was selected by the Phillies in December 1963 in the annual first-year player draft then in force, and worked his way through the club's farm system for the next five seasons. In 1969, he made the MLB Phillies' roster and spent the season as the team's backup catcher to regular Mike Ryan. In 69 games, including 33 as starting catcher, Watkins had 26 hits in 148 at-bats for a .176 batting average. He collected two doubles, a triple and four home runs.

The 1969 campaign was Watkins' last in baseball before he began his education and career in medicine.
