= Larry Maxie =

American baseball player (born 1940)

- Pitcher
- Born: October 10, 1940 (age 84); Upland, California, U.S.
- Batted: Right Threw: Right

MLB debut
- August 30, 1969, for the Atlanta Braves

Last MLB appearance
- August 31, 1969, for the Atlanta Braves

MLB statistics
- Win–loss record: 0–0
- Earned run average: 3.00
- Strikeouts: 1
- Stats at Baseball Reference

Teams
- Atlanta Braves (1969)

Larry Hans Maxie (born October 10, 1940) is an American former professional baseball player and scout. During his on-field career he was a right-handed pitcher who appeared in two games in the Major Leagues for the Atlanta Braves on August 30 and 31, 1969. However, Maxie's pitching career extended for 15 seasons (1958–1972), all in the Braves' organization.

Maxie stood 6 feet 4 inches (1.93 m) tall and weighed 220 pounds (100 kg). He attended Chaffey High School and then signed with the Braves when they were still based in Milwaukee and reached the Triple-A level in 1961. But he would be in his 12th year in the Brave organization when he finally made his MLB debut in 1969, working on successive days as a relief pitcher against the Chicago Cubs at Atlanta Fulton County Stadium. In three full innings pitched, he allowed one earned run on one hit (a double by Don Kessinger). He issued one base on balls and struck out one (Randy Hundley). He threw two wild pitches. He was on Atlanta's postseason roster for the 1969 National League Championship Series versus the New York Mets, but did not play.

In the minors, Maxie won 125 games. He continued his baseball career as a longtime scout for the Braves and other MLB teams.
