= Bill Champion (baseball) =

American baseball player (1947–2017)

Billy Champion
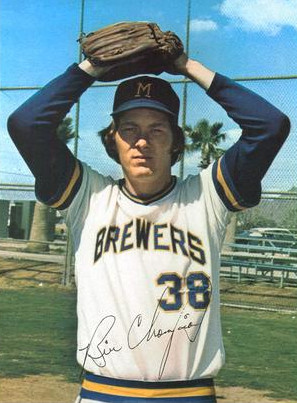
- Champion in 1973
- Pitcher
- Born: September 18, 1947; Shelby, North Carolina, U.S.
- Died: January 7, 2017 (aged 69); Shelby, North Carolina, U.S.
- Batted: Right Threw: Right

MLB debut
- June 4, 1969, for the Philadelphia Phillies

Last MLB appearance
- June 5, 1976, for the Milwaukee Brewers

MLB statistics
- Win–loss record: 34–50
- Earned run average: 4.69
- Strikeouts: 360
- Stats at Baseball Reference

Teams
- Philadelphia Phillies (1969–1972); Milwaukee Brewers (1973–1976)

Buford Billy Champion (September 18, 1947 – January 7, 2017) was an American professional baseball right-handed pitcher, coach, and scout who played in 202 games in Major League Baseball (MLB) for the Philadelphia Phillies and Milwaukee Brewers, from 1969–1976.

Bill was selected by the Philadelphia Phillies in the 3rd round (58th overall) of the 1965 MLB June Amateur Draft out of Shelby High School in Shelby, North Carolina. In high school, Champion helped the Shelby baseball team win the 1964 Western North Carolina High School Activities Association (WNCHSAA) championship.

Before his big league debut in 1969, Champion was already a two-time Minor League Baseball (MiLB) earned run average (ERA) league leader: Huron Phillies, Northern League (1965); and Tidewater Tides, Carolina League (1968). He was traded along with Don Money and John Vukovich by the Phillies to the Brewers for Jim Lonborg, Ken Brett, Ken Sanders and Earl Stephenson on October 31, 1972.

Champion went on to become a scout for the Chicago Cubs and pitching coach for the Greenville Braves.

Champion died on January 7, 2017, in Shelby, North Carolina, at the age of 69.
