= Santiago Guzmán (baseball) =

Dominican baseball player (born 1949)

- Pitcher
- Born: July 25, 1949 (age 76); San Pedro de Macorís, Dominican Republic
- Batted: Right Threw: Right

MLB debut
- September 30, 1969, for the St. Louis Cardinals

Last MLB appearance
- April 18, 1972, for the St. Louis Cardinals

MLB statistics
- Win–loss record: 1–2
- Earned run average: 4.50
- Innings pitched: 32
- Stats at Baseball Reference

Teams
- St. Louis Cardinals (1969–1972)

Santiago Donovan Guzmán (born July 25, 1949) is a Dominican former professional baseball player, a right-handed pitcher who appeared in 12 Major League games for the St. Louis Cardinals from 1969–1972. The native of San Pedro de Macorís stood 6 feet 2 inches (1.88 m) tall and weighed 180 pounds (82 kg).

Guzmán broke into pro baseball as a teenage sensation in 1967 for the St. Petersburg Cardinals of the Class A Florida State League. He compiled a 16–3 won–loss record, an earned run average of 1.74, and led the FSL with seven shutouts. The following year, he tied for the lead in games won (13) in the Double-A Texas League. Called up to the Cardinals near the end of the 1969 season, he made his debut September 30 as the starting pitcher in a 4–3 loss to the Philadelphia Phillies. Guzmán lasted 7 1/3 innings and struck out seven, but surrendered all four earned runs and nine hits, including home runs to Johnny Briggs and Tony Taylor.

In 1970, he made the Cardinals out of spring training and appeared in seven early-season games. On May 19 he received his second MLB starting assignment, and pitched a complete game, five-hit, 12–3 victory over the Houston Astros for his only Major League victory. He spent the bulk of that season with the Cardinals' Tulsa Oilers Triple-A farm club, then hurled one more game for the Redbirds in September. His 1971 and 1972 seasons were almost exclusively spent in minor league baseball, as Guzmán appeared in two MLB games in 1971 and one in 1972.

He retired after the 1973 season. All told, Santiago Guzmán allowed 30 hits and 18 bases on balls in 32 innings of work with the Cardinals. He struck out 29.
