= 1972 Chicago Cubs season =

1972 Chicago Cubs
- League: National League
- Division: East
- Ballpark: Wrigley Field
- City: Chicago
- Record: 85–70 (.548)
- Divisional place: 2nd
- Owners: Philip K. Wrigley
- General managers: John Holland
- Managers: Leo Durocher, Whitey Lockman
- Television: WGN-TV (Jack Brickhouse, Jim West)
- Radio: WGN (Vince Lloyd, Lou Boudreau)
- Stats: ESPN.com; Baseball Reference

The 1972 Chicago Cubs season was the 101st season of the Chicago Cubs franchise, the 97th in the National League and the 57th at Wrigley Field. The Cubs finished second in the National League East with a record of 85–70.

== Offseason ==
- November 29, 1971: Ken Holtzman was traded by the Cubs to the Oakland Athletics for Rick Monday.
- December 1, 1971: Ernie Banks was released by the Cubs.
- January 20, 1972: Johnny Callison was traded by the Cubs to the New York Yankees for a player to be named later. The Yankees completed the deal by sending Jack Aker to the Cubs on May 17.
- February 14, 1972: Julio González was signed as an amateur free agent by the Cubs.

== Regular season ==
=== Season standings ===
NL East
Team	W	L	Pct.	GB	Home	Road
Pittsburgh Pirates	96	59	.619	—	49‍–‍29	47‍–‍30
Chicago Cubs	85	70	.548	11	46‍–‍31	39‍–‍39
New York Mets	83	73	.532	13½	41‍–‍37	42‍–‍36
St. Louis Cardinals	75	81	.481	21½	40‍–‍37	35‍–‍44
Montreal Expos	70	86	.449	26½	35‍–‍43	35‍–‍43
Philadelphia Phillies	59	97	.378	37½	28‍–‍51	31‍–‍46

=== Record vs. opponents ===
1972 National League record Sources:
Team	ATL	CHC	CIN	HOU	LAD	MON	NYM	PHI	PIT	SD	SF	STL
Atlanta	—	5–7–1	9–9	7–7	7–8	4–8	7–5	6–6	6–6	6–11	7–11	6–6
Chicago	7–5–1	—	8–4	3–9	8–4	10–5	10–8	10–7	3–12	9–3	7–5	10–8
Cincinnati	9–9	4–8	—	11–6	9–5	8–4	8–4	10–2	8–4	8–10	10–5	10–2
Houston	7–7	9–3	6–11	—	7–11	8–4	6–6	9–3	3–9	12–2	13–5	4–8
Los Angeles	8–7	4–8	5–9	11–7	—	6–6	7–5	7–5	7–5	13–5	9–9	8–4
Montreal	8–4	5–10	4–8	4–8	6–6	—	6–12	10–6	6–12	6–6	6–6	9–8
New York	5–7	8–10	4–8	6–6	5–7	12–6	—	13–5	8–6	7–5	8–4	7–9
Philadelphia	6-6	7–10	2–10	3–9	5–7	6–10	5–13	—	5–13	6–6	6–6	8–7
Pittsburgh	6–6	12–3	4–8	9–3	5–7	12–6	6–8	13–5	—	10–2	9–3	10–8
San Diego	11–6	3–9	10–8	2–12	5–13	6–6	5–7	6–6	2–10	—	4–10	4–8
San Francisco	11–7	5–7	5–10	5–13	9–9	6–6	4–8	6–6	3–9	10–4	—	5–7
St. Louis	6–6	8–10	2–10	8–4	4–8	8–9	9–7	7–8	8–10	8–4	7–5	—

=== Notable transactions ===
- August 18, 1972: Tommy Davis was traded by the Cubs to the Baltimore Orioles for Elrod Hendricks.

==== Draft picks ====
- June 6, 1972: 1972 Major League Baseball draft
  - Buddy Schultz was drafted by the Cubs in the 6th round.
  - Ray Burris was drafted by the Cubs in the 17th round. Player signed June 11, 1972.

=== Roster ===
1972 Chicago Cubs
Roster
Pitchers: 38 Jack Aker; 33 Bill Bonham; 34 Clint Compton; 37 Joe Decker; 40 Larry Gura; 37 Steve Hamilton; 49 Bill Hands; 44 Burt Hooton; 31 Ferguson Jenkins; 30 Dan McGinn; 32 Milt Pappas; 36 Tom Phoebus; 46 Juan Pizarro; 27 Phil Regan; 48 Rick Reuschel	Catchers: 47 Frank Fernández; 39 Elrod Hendricks; 9 Randy Hundley; 12 J. C. Martin; 15 Ken Rudolph; Infielders: 18 Glenn Beckert; 19 Pat Bourque; 24 Tommy Davis; 23 Carmen Fanzone; 28 Jim Hickman; 11 Don Kessinger; 29 Al Montreuil; 8 Joe Pepitone; 22 Paul Popovich; 17 Dave Rosello; 10 Ron Santo; 24 Art Shamsky	Outfielders: 1 José Cardenal; 16,21 Gene Hiser; 24 Pete LaCock; 7 Rick Monday; 25 Billy North; 27 Jim Tyrone; 26 Billy Williams; Other batters: 17 Frank Coggins; 20 Chris Ward	Manager: 2 Leo Durocher; 16 Whitey Lockman; Coaches: 4 Hank Aguirre (Bench); 14 Ernie Banks (First base); 3 Larry Jansen (Pitching); 5 Q. V. Lowe (Bullpen); 6 Pete Reiser (Third base)

== Player stats ==
=== Batting ===
==== Starters by position ====
Note: Pos = Position; G = Games played; AB = At bats; H = Hits; Avg. = Batting average; HR = Home runs; RBI = Runs batted in

Pos	Player	G	AB	H	Avg.	HR	RBI
C	Randy Hundley	114	357	78	.218	5	30
1B	Jim Hickman	115	368	100	.272	17	64
2B	Glenn Beckert	120	474	128	.270	3	43
SS	Don Kessinger	149	577	158	.274	1	39
3B	Ron Santo	133	464	140	.302	17	74
LF	Billy Williams	150	574	191	.333	37	122
CF	Rick Monday	138	434	108	.249	11	42
RF	José Cardenal	143	533	155	.291	17	70

==== Other batters ====
Note: G = Games played; AB = At bats; H = Hits; Avg. = Batting average; HR = Home runs; RBI = Runs batted in

Player	G	AB	H	Avg.	HR	RBI
Carmen Fanzone	86	222	50	.225	8	42
Joe Pepitone	66	214	56	.262	8	21
Paul Popovich	58	129	25	.194	1	11
Bill North	66	127	23	.181	0	4
Ken Rudolph	42	106	25	.236	2	9
J.C. Martin	25	50	12	.240	0	7
Gene Hiser	32	46	9	.196	0	4
Elrod Hendricks	17	43	5	.116	2	6
Pat Bourque	11	27	7	.259	0	5
Tommy Davis	15	26	7	.269	0	6
Art Shamsky	15	16	2	.125	0	1
Dave Rosello	5	12	3	.250	1	3
Al Montreuil	5	11	1	.091	0	0
Jim Tyrone	13	8	0	.000	0	0
Pete LaCock	5	6	3	.500	0	4
Frank Fernández	3	3	0	.000	0	0
Frank Coggins	6	1	0	.000	0	0
Chris Ward	1	1	0	.000	0	0

=== Pitching ===
==== Starting pitchers ====
Note: G = Games pitched; IP = Innings pitched; W = Wins; L = Losses; ERA = Earned run average; SO = Strikeouts

Player	G	IP	W	L	ERA	SO
Ferguson Jenkins	36	289.1	20	12	3.20	184
Burt Hooton	33	218.1	11	14	2.80	132
Milt Pappas	29	195.0	17	7	2.77	80
Bill Hands	32	189.0	11	8	3.00	96
Rick Reuschel	31	129.0	10	8	2.93	87

==== Other pitchers ====
Note: G = Games pitched; IP = Innings pitched; W = Wins; L = Losses; ERA = Earned run average; SO = Strikeouts

Player	G	IP	W	L	ERA	SO
Juan Pizarro	16	59.1	4	5	3.94	24
Bill Bonham	19	57.2	1	1	3.12	49
Joe Decker	5	12.2	1	0	2.13	7

==== Relief pitchers ====
Note: G = Games pitched; W = Wins; L = Losses; SV = Saves; ERA = Earned run average; SO = Strikeouts

Player	G	W	L	SV	ERA	SO
Jack Aker	48	6	6	17	2.96	36
Dan McGinn	42	0	5	4	5.89	42
Tom Phoebus	37	3	3	6	3.78	59
Steve Hamilton	22	1	0	0	4.76	13
Larry Gura	7	0	0	0	3.65	13
Phil Regan	5	0	1	0	2.25	2
Clint Compton	1	0	0	0	9.00	0

== Farm system ==
Level	Team	League	Manager
AAA	Wichita Aeros	American Association	Jim Marshall
AA	Midland Cubs	Texas League	Al Spangler
A	Quincy Cubs	Midwest League	Dick LeMay
Rookie	GCL Cubs	Gulf Coast League	Walt Dixon

LEAGUE CHAMPIONS: GCL Cubs
