= 1960 International League season =

- League: International League
- Sport: Baseball
- Duration: April 20 – September 22
- Games: 154
- Teams: 8

Regular season
- Season MVP: Jim King, Toronto Maple Leafs

Governors' Cup Playoffs
- League champions: Toronto Maple Leafs
- Runners-up: Rochester Red Wings

IL seasons
- ← 1959 1961 →

The 1960 International League was a Class AAA baseball season played between April 20 and September 22. Eight teams played a 154-game schedule, with the top four teams qualifying for the post-season.

The Toronto Maple Leafs won the Governors' Cup, defeating the Rochester Red Wings in the final round of the playoffs.

== Team changes ==
- The Toronto Maple Leafs begin an affiliation with the Cleveland Indians.
- The Havana Sugar Kings relocated to Jersey City, New Jersey during the regular season.

== Teams ==
1960 International League
Team	City	MLB Affiliate	Stadium
Buffalo Bisons	Buffalo, New York	Philadelphia Phillies	Offermann Stadium
Columbus Jets	Columbus, Ohio	Pittsburgh Pirates	Jets Stadium
Havana Sugar Kings; Jersey City Jerseys	Havana, Cuba; Jersey City, New Jersey	Cincinnati Reds	Gran Stadium; Roosevelt Stadium
Miami Marlins	Miami, Florida	Baltimore Orioles	Miami Stadium
Montreal Royals	Montreal, Quebec	Los Angeles Dodgers	Delorimier Stadium
Richmond Virginians	Richmond, Virginia	New York Yankees	Parker Field
Rochester Red Wings	Rochester, New York	St. Louis Cardinals	Red Wing Stadium
Toronto Maple Leafs	Toronto, Ontario	Cleveland Indians	Maple Leaf Stadium

== Map of teams ==
International League teams

== Regular season ==
=== Summary ===
- The Toronto Maple Leafs finished with the best record in the league for the first time since 1957.
- On July 8, The Havana Sugar Kings relocated to Jersey City, New Jersey and became the Jersey City Jerseys.

=== Standings ===
International League
Team	Win	Loss	%	GB
Toronto Maple Leafs	100	54	.649	–
Richmond Virginians	82	70	.539	17
Rochester Red Wings	81	73	.526	19
Buffalo Bisons	78	75	.510	21.5
Havana Sugar Kings/Jersey City Jerseys	76	77	.497	23.5
Columbus Jets	69	84	.451	30.5
Miami Marlins	65	88	.425	34.5
Montreal Royals	62	92	.403	38

== League Leaders ==
=== Batting leaders ===
Stat	Player	Total
AVG	Jim Frey, Rochester Red Wings	.318
H	Don Landrum, Buffalo Bisons; Jim Pendleton, Havana / Jersey City	178
R	Don Landrum, Buffalo Bisons	112
2B	Don Landrum, Buffalo Bisons	35
3B	Lou Jackson, Havana / Jersey City	16
HR	Joe Altobelli, Montreal Royals	31
RBI	Joe Altobelli, Montreal Royals	105
SB	Solly Drake, Buffalo Bisons	16

=== Pitching leaders ===
Stat	Player	Total
W	Al Cicotte, Toronto Maple Leafs	16
L	Bill Kunkel, Montreal Royals	18
ERA	Al Cicotte, Toronto Maple Leafs	1.79
CG	Ken Lehman, Buffalo Bisons; Herb Moford, Miami Marlins	14
SHO	Al Cicotte, Toronto Maple Leafs	8
SO	Al Cicotte, Toronto Maple Leafs	158
IP	Bill Kunkel, Montreal Royals	210.0

== Playoffs ==
- The Toronto Maple Leafs won their second Governors' Cup, defeating the Rochester Red Wings in five games.

=== Playoff bracket ===
Semi-finals
1	Toronto	4
4	Buffalo	0
2	Richmond	1
3	Rochester	4

Governors' Cup
1	Toronto	4
3	Rochester	1

== Awards ==
Player awards
Award name	Recipient
Most Valuable Player	Jim King, Toronto Maple Leafs
Pitcher of the Year	Al Cicotte, Toronto Maple Leafs
Rookie of the Year	Bobby Wine, Buffalo Bisons

== See also ==
- 1960 Major League Baseball season
