= 1957 International League season =

- League: International League
- Sport: Baseball
- Duration: April 15 – September 22
- Games: 154
- Teams: 8

Regular season
- Season MVP: Mike Baxes, Buffalo Bisons

Governors' Cup Playoffs
- League champions: Buffalo Bisons
- Runners-up: Miami Marlins

IL seasons
- ← 1956 1958 →

The 1957 International League was a Class AAA baseball season played between April 15 and September 22. Eight teams played a 154-game schedule, with the top four teams qualifying for the post-season.

The Buffalo Bisons won the Governors' Cup, defeating the Miami Marlins in the final round of the playoffs.

== Team changes ==
- The Columbus Jets end their affiliation with the Kansas City Athletics and begin an affiliation with the Detroit Tigers.
- The Buffalo Bisons begin an affiliation with the Kansas City Athletics.

== Teams ==
1957 International League
Team	City	MLB Affiliate	Stadium
Buffalo Bisons	Buffalo, New York	Kansas City Athletics	Offermann Stadium
Columbus Jets	Columbus, Ohio	Detroit Tigers	Jets Stadium
Havana Sugar Kings	Havana, Cuba	Cincinnati Reds	Gran Stadium
Miami Marlins	Miami, Florida	Philadelphia Phillies	Miami Stadium
Montreal Royals	Montreal, Quebec	Brooklyn Dodgers	Delorimier Stadium
Richmond Virginians	Richmond, Virginia	New York Yankees	Parker Field
Rochester Red Wings	Rochester, New York	St. Louis Cardinals	Red Wing Stadium
Toronto Maple Leafs	Toronto, Ontario	None	Maple Leaf Stadium

== Map of teams ==
International League teams

== Regular season ==
=== Summary ===
- The Toronto Maple Leafs finished with the best record in the league for the third time in four seasons.

=== Standings ===
International League
Team	Win	Loss	%	GB
Toronto Maple Leafs	88	65	.575	–
Buffalo Bisons	88	66	.571	0.5
Richmond Virginians	81	73	.526	7.5
Miami Marlins	75	78	.490	13
Rochester Red Wings	74	80	.481	14.5
Havana Sugar Kings	72	82	.468	16.5
Columbus Jets	69	85	.448	19.5
Montreal Royals	68	86	.442	20.5

== League Leaders ==
=== Batting leaders ===
Stat	Player	Total
AVG	Joe Caffie, Buffalo Bisons	.330
H	Mike Baxes, Buffalo Bisons	179
R	Mike Baxes, Buffalo Bisons	101
2B	Mike Baxes, Buffalo Bisons	40
3B	Don Landrum, Miami Marlins	17
HR	Luke Easter, Buffalo Bisons	40
RBI	Luke Easter, Buffalo Bisons	128
SB	Len Johnston, Richmond Virginians	26

=== Pitching leaders ===
Stat	Player	Total
W	Walt Craddock, Buffalo Bisons; Humberto Robinson, Toronto Maple Leafs	18
L	Fred Kipp, Montreal Royals	17
ERA	Mike Cuellar, Havana Sugar Kings	2.44
CG	Walt Craddock, Buffalo Bisons; Lynn Lovenguth, Rochester Red Wings	15
SHO	Jim Coates, Richmond Virginians	6
SO	Jim Coates, Richmond Virginians	161
IP	Jim Coates, Richmond Virginians; Humberto Robinson, Toronto Maple Leafs	226.0

== Playoffs ==
- The Buffalo Bisons won their third Governors' Cup, defeating the Miami Marlins in five games.

=== Playoff bracket ===
Semi-finals
1	Toronto	2
4	Miami	4
2	Buffalo	4
3	Richmond	2

Governors' Cup
4	Miami	1
2	Buffalo	4

== Awards ==
Player awards
Award name	Recipient
Most Valuable Player	Mike Baxes, Buffalo Bisons
Pitcher of the Year	Don Johnson, Toronto Maple Leafs
Rookie of the Year	Walt Craddock, Buffalo Bisons

== See also ==
- 1957 Major League Baseball season
