= 1958 International League season =

- League: International League
- Sport: Baseball
- Duration: April 16 – September 24
- Games: 154
- Teams: 8

Regular season
- Season MVP: Rocky Nelson, Toronto Maple Leafs

Governors' Cup Playoffs
- League champions: Montreal Royals
- Runners-up: Toronto Maple Leafs

IL seasons
- ← 1957 1959 →

The 1958 International League was a Class AAA baseball season played between April 16 and September 24. Eight teams played a 154-game schedule, with the top four teams qualifying for the post-season.

The Montreal Royals won the Governors' Cup, defeating the Toronto Maple Leafs in the final round of the playoffs.

== Team changes ==
- The Columbus Jets end their affiliation with the Detroit Tigers and begin an affiliation with the Pittsburgh Pirates.

== Teams ==
1958 International League
Team	City	MLB Affiliate	Stadium
Buffalo Bisons	Buffalo, New York	Kansas City Athletics	Offermann Stadium
Columbus Jets	Columbus, Ohio	Pittsburgh Pirates	Jets Stadium
Havana Sugar Kings	Havana, Cuba	Cincinnati Reds	Gran Stadium
Miami Marlins	Miami, Florida	Philadelphia Phillies	Miami Stadium
Montreal Royals	Montreal, Quebec	Los Angeles Dodgers	Delorimier Stadium
Richmond Virginians	Richmond, Virginia	New York Yankees	Parker Field
Rochester Red Wings	Rochester, New York	St. Louis Cardinals	Red Wing Stadium
Toronto Maple Leafs	Toronto, Ontario	None	Maple Leaf Stadium

== Map of teams ==
International League teams

== Regular season ==
=== Summary ===
- The Montreal Royals finished with the best record in the league for the first time since 1955.
- Rocky Nelson of the Toronto Maple Leafs became the first player in league history to win the International League Most Valuable Player Award for the third time.

=== Standings ===
International League
Team	Win	Loss	%	GB
Montreal Royals	90	63	.588	–
Toronto Maple Leafs	87	65	.572	2.5
Rochester Red Wings	77	75	.507	12.5
Columbus Jets	77	77	.500	13.5
Miami Marlins	75	78	.490	15
Richmond Virginians	71	82	.464	19
Buffalo Bisons	69	83	.454	20.5
Havana Sugar Kings	65	88	.425	25

== League Leaders ==
=== Batting leaders ===
Stat	Player	Total
AVG	Rocky Nelson, Toronto Maple Leafs	.326
H	Solly Drake, Montreal Royals	183
R	Solly Drake, Montreal Royals	105
2B	Joe Caffie, Buffalo Bisons	39
3B	Solly Drake, Montreal Royals	16
HR	Rocky Nelson, Toronto Maple Leafs	43
RBI	Rocky Nelson, Toronto Maple Leafs	120
SB	Len Johnston, Richmond Virginians	37

=== Pitching leaders ===
Stat	Player	Total
W	Tommy Lasorda, Montreal Royals	18
L	Billy Bethel, Richmond Virginians	18
ERA	Bobby Tiefenauer, Toronto Maple Leafs	1.89
CG	Tommy Lasorda, Montreal Royals	16
SO	Cal Browning, Rochester Red Wings	173
IP	Tommy Lasorda, Montreal Royals	230.0

== Playoffs ==
- The Montreal Royals won their seventh Governors' Cup, defeating the Toronto Maple Leafs in five games.

=== Playoff bracket ===
Semi-finals
1	Montreal	4
4	Columbus	3
2	Toronto	4
3	Rochester	1

Governors' Cup
1	Montreal	4
2	Toronto	1

== Awards ==
Player awards
Award name	Recipient
Most Valuable Player	Rocky Nelson, Toronto Maple Leafs
Pitcher of the Year	Tommy Lasorda, Montreal Royals
Rookie of the Year	Rogelio Álvarez, Havana Sugar Kings

== See also ==
- 1958 Major League Baseball season
