= 1969 Chicago Cubs season =

1969 Chicago Cubs
- League: National League
- Division: East
- Ballpark: Wrigley Field
- City: Chicago
- Record: 92–70 (.568)
- Divisional place: 2nd
- Owners: Philip K. Wrigley
- General managers: John Holland
- Managers: Leo Durocher
- Television: WGN-TV (Jack Brickhouse, Lloyd Pettit)
- Radio: WGN (Vince Lloyd, Lou Boudreau)
- Stats: ESPN.com; Baseball Reference

The 1969 Chicago Cubs season was the 98th season of the Chicago Cubs franchise, the 94th in the National League and the 54th at Wrigley Field. The season involved the Cubs gaining renown as "the most celebrated second-place team in the history of baseball." In the first season after the National League was split into two divisions, the Cubs finished with a record of 92–70, 8 games behind the New York Mets in the newly established National League East. Caustic 64-year-old Leo Durocher was the Cubs manager. The ill-fated season saw the Cubs in first place for 155 days, until mid-September when they lost 17 out of 25 games.

== Offseason ==
=== The new National League ===
With further expansion to the league, the 1969 season marked the first year of divisional play in Major League Baseball. The Atlanta Braves (along with the Cincinnati Reds) were placed in the NL West division, despite being located further east than the 2 westernmost teams in the NL East Division, the Cubs and St. Louis Cardinals. This was because the New York Mets wanted to be in the same division as the reigning power in the NL, which was the Cardinals at the time (to compensate for playing against the Dodgers and Giants fewer times each season). The Cubs consequently demanded to be in the NL East as well in order to continue playing in the same division as the Cardinals, one of the Cubs' biggest rivals. A side effect of this alignment is that it set the stage for what is considered one of the greatest pennant races – and comebacks in such a race – in MLB history.

=== Notable transactions ===
- November 11, 1968: Dave Rosello was signed as an amateur free agent by the Cubs.
- January 15, 1969: Joe Campbell and Chuck Hartenstein were traded by the Cubs to the Pittsburgh Pirates for Manny Jiménez.
- March 28, 1969: Charley Smith was purchased by the Cubs from the San Francisco Giants.

== Regular season ==
=== Season summary ===
Hoping to improve on the previous year's 84–78 record, the Cubs began the 1969 season by winning 11 of their first 12 games, and on August 16, they were 75–44, up by a season high nine games over second place New York. By September 2, they had a record of 84–52, well on pace to exceed the previous season's mark, but their lead over the Mets had fallen to five games. From there the Mets went on a tear. The Cubs ultimately lost 17 of the last 25 games of the season, while the Mets went 23–7 to overtake the Cubs and finish eight games ahead of them. It was one of the most astounding late season collapses in history, with the seventeen-game turnaround being one of the biggest ever. The Cubs finished 92–70, while the Mets won the National League East and would go on to win the World Series.

==== Summer of '69 ====
Throughout the summer of 1969, led by future Hall of Famers Ernie Banks, Ferguson Jenkins, Ron Santo, Billy Williams, and the game calling skills of Randy Hundley behind the plate, the Chicago Cubs had built a substantial lead in the newly created National League East. At the conclusion of each victory 3rd baseman Santo would jump and click his heels in celebration. After starting pitcher Ken Holtzman's no-hitter on August 19, the Cubs led the division by 8 1/2 games over the St. Louis Cardinals and 9 1/2 games over the New York Mets.

==== The Rise ====
The 1969 season was bookended by a pair of homers that was memorable on one side and infamous on the other. On opening day at Wrigley Field on April 8, the Cubs trailed the Phillies 6–5 in the bottom of the 11th inning. With a runner on base, Willie Smith hit a game-winning home run into the right field bleachers. This event essentially "lit the fuse" to the Cubs' successful first five months of the season. They would win the next three games, and 11 out of their first 12, and create a cushion that would extend to 8 1/2 games in mid-August.

==== The Fall ====
After the game of September 2, the Cubs' record was 84–52 with the Mets in second place at 77–55. But then a losing streak began just as a Mets winning streak was beginning. The Cubs lost the final game of a series at Cincinnati, then came home to play the Pittsburgh Pirates (who would finish in third place). After losing the first two games by scores of 9–2 and 13–4, the Cubs led going into the ninth inning in the series finale but Willie Stargell drilled a 2-out, 2-strike pitch from the Cubs' ace reliever, Phil Regan, onto Sheffield Avenue to tie the score in the top of the ninth. The Cubs would lose 7–5 in extra innings. Meanwhile, the Mets had taken two of three against Philadelphia over the same weekend.

Burdened by a four-game losing streak, the Cubs traveled to Shea Stadium on September 8 for a short two-game set. The Mets won both games, and the Cubs left New York with a record of 84–58 just 1/2 game in front. Disaster followed in Philadelphia, as a 99-loss Phillies team nonetheless defeated the Cubs twice, to extend Chicago's losing streak to eight games. In a key play in the second game, on September 11, Cubs starter Dick Selma threw a surprise pickoff attempt to third baseman Ron Santo, who was nowhere near the bag or the ball. Selma's throwing error opened the gates to a Phillies rally.

After that second Philly loss, the Cubs were 84–60 and the Mets had pulled ahead at 85–57. The Mets would not look back. The Cubs' eight-game losing streak finally ended the next day in St. Louis, but the Mets were in the midst of a ten-game winning streak, and the Cubs, wilting from team fatigue, generally deteriorated in all phases of the game. The Mets (who had lost a record 120 games in their inaugural season 7 years earlier), would go on to win the World Series. The Cubs, despite a respectable 92–70 record, would be remembered for having lost a remarkable 17 1/2 games in the standings to the Mets in the last quarter of the season.

==== Bad luck ====
Banks stated, however, that after an error by Young, Santo "went crazy. Young was so upset, he ran out ... I had never seen something so hurtful." According to Banks, "They say one apple can spoil the whole barrel, and I saw that," with the incident dividing the team into factions. The Book Baseball Hall of Shame 2 places the blame squarely (and perhaps unfairly) at the feet of one man, stating, "In the heat of battle, Leo Durocher, field general of the Cubs, went AWOL once too often. It was because of his lack of leadership that his team lost the fight for the 1969 pennant." Durocher did not believe in using the platoon system. He believed in putting his best eight players on the field every day. Five of the Cubs' regular players finished the season with over 150 games played. Two more had more than 130 games played. In his book, The Bill James Historical Baseball Abstract, baseball historian Bill James cited manager Durocher's method of using his regular players every day without any rest days as a factor in the Cubs' collapse.

Overuse of the pitching staff may have played a part. During the first 118 games (74–43 record on August 13), the Cubs averaged about 4.7 runs a game and gave up only 3.5 runs per game, a 1.2 run per game advantage over the opposition. The last 45 games (18–27 record) saw a major reversal, with 3.7 runs per game for the team and 4.5 runs per game for the opposition (average Cub score would be a negative −0.8 runs per game versus opponents, almost a complete reversal from earlier play). Both the hitters and pitchers may have wilted as the season wound down.

Perhaps most ominously, during one of the Cubs' games against the Mets, a black cat ran onto the field near Santo, and after the cat appeared, the Cubs' collapse began. Earlier in the game, Santo was beaned by Mets pitcher Jerry Koosman. This only fueled the myth of the Curse of the Billy Goat for many years afterwards.

=== Season standings ===
NL East
Team	W	L	Pct.	GB	Home	Road
New York Mets	100	62	.617	—	52‍–‍30	48‍–‍32
Chicago Cubs	92	70	.568	8	49‍–‍32	43‍–‍38
Pittsburgh Pirates	88	74	.543	12	47‍–‍34	41‍–‍40
St. Louis Cardinals	87	75	.537	13	42‍–‍38	45‍–‍37
Philadelphia Phillies	63	99	.389	37	30‍–‍51	33‍–‍48
Montreal Expos	52	110	.321	48	24‍–‍57	28‍–‍53

=== Record vs. opponents ===
1969 National League record Sources:
Team	ATL	CHC	CIN	HOU	LAD	MON	NYM	PHI	PIT	SD	SF	STL
Atlanta	—	3–9	12–6	15–3	9–9	8–4	4–8	6–6	8–4	13–5	9–9	6–6
Chicago	9–3	—	6–6–1	8–4	6–6	10–8	8–10	12–6	7–11	11–1	6–6	9–9
Cincinnati	6–12	6–6–1	—	9–9	10–8	8–4	6–6	10–2	5–7	11–7	10–8	8–4
Houston	3–15	4–8	9–9	—	6–12	11–1	10–2	8–4	3–9	10–8	10–8	7–5
Los Angeles	9–9	6–6	8–10	12–6	—	10–2	4–8	8–4	8–4	12–6	5–13	3–9
Montreal	4–8	8–10	4–8	1–11	2–10	—	5–13	11–7	5–13	4–8	1–11	7–11
New York	8–4	10–8	6–6	2–10	8–4	13–5	—	12–6	10–8	11–1	8–4	12–6
Philadelphia	6-6	6–12	2–10	4–8	4–8	7–11	6–12	—	10–8	8–4	3–9	7–11
Pittsburgh	4–8	11–7	7–5	9–3	4–8	13–5	8–10	8–10	—	10–2	5–7	9–9
San Diego	5–13	1–11	7–11	8–10	6–12	8–4	1–11	4–8	2–10	—	6–12	4–8
San Francisco	9–9	6–6	8–10	8–10	13–5	11–1	4–8	9–3	7–5	12–6	—	3–9
St. Louis	6–6	9–9	4–8	5–7	9–3	11–7	6–12	11–7	9–9	8–4	9–3	—

=== Notable transactions ===
- June 11, 1969: Adolfo Phillips and Jack Lamabe were traded by the Cubs to the Montreal Expos for Paul Popovich.

==== Draft picks ====
- June 5, 1969: 1969 Major League Baseball draft
  - Jim Todd was drafted by the Cubs in the 10th round.
  - Pat Bourque was drafted by the Cubs in the 33rd round. Player signed June 9, 1969.

=== Roster ===
1969 Chicago Cubs
**Roster**
**Pitchers**: 37 Ted Abernathy; 34 Hank Aguirre; 48 Jim Colborn; 36 Joe Decker; 45 Alec Distaso; 49 Bill Hands; 30 Ken Holtzman; 31 Ferguson Jenkins; 46 Ken Johnson; 48 Dave Lemonds; 48 Joe Niekro; 38 Don Nottebart; 32 Rich Nye; 27 Phil Regan; 39 Archie Reynolds; 33 Gary Ross; 39 Dick Selma	**Catchers**: 6 Randy Bobb; 43 Johnny Hairston; 19 Bill Heath; 9 Randy Hundley; 12 Gene Oliver; 8 Ken Rudolph; **Infielders**: 14 Ernie Banks; 18 Glenn Beckert; 11 Don Kessinger; 15 Nate Oliver; 22 Paul Popovich; 10 Ron Santo	**Outfielders**: 20 Rick Bladt; 20 Oscar Gamble; 23 Jimmie Hall; 28 Jim Hickman; 20 Adolfo Phillips; 42 Jim Qualls; 25 Willie Smith; 21 Al Spangler; 26 Billy Williams; 29 Donald Young; **Other batters**: 23 Manny Jiménez; 19 Charley Smith	**Manager**: 2 Leo Durocher; **Coaches**: 5 Joey Amalfitano; 3 Joe Becker; 7 Pete Reiser; 4 Verlon Walker

=== Game log ===
1969 Game Log (92–70)
April: 16–7 (Home: 7–2; Away: 9–5)

#	Date	Opponent	Score	Win	Loss	Save	Attendance	Record
1	April 8	Phillies	7 – 6 11	**Regan (1–0)**	Lersch (0–1)		40,796	1–0
2	April 9	Phillies	11–3	**Hands (1–0)**	Wise (0–1)		6,297	2–0
3	April 10	Phillies	6–2	**Holtzman (1–0)**	Fryman (0–1)		5,422	3–0
4	April 11	Expos	1 – 0 12	**Abernathy (1–0)**	Sembera (0–1)		7,281	4–0
5	April 12	Expos	7–3	Grant (1–0)	**Jenkins (0–1)**	Sembera (2)	28,599	4–1
6	April 13	Expos	7–6	**Regan (2–0)**	Stoneman (0–2)		27,664	5–1
7	April 14	Pirates	4–0	**Holtzman (2–0)**	Veale (1–1)		3,114	6–1
8	April 15	Pirates	7–4	**Aguirre (1–0)**	Ellis (1–1)	**Abernathy (1)**	4,362	7–1
9	April 16	@ Cardinals	1–0	**Jenkins (1–1)**	Carlton (1–1)		16,418	8–1
10	April 17	@ Cardinals	3–0	**Hands (2–0)**	Giusti (1–1)	**Regan (1)**	11,350	9–1
11	April 19	@ Expos	6 – 5 11	**Regan (3–0)**	Shaw (1–2)		16,005	10–1
12	April 20	@ Expos	6–3	**Jenkins (2–1)**	Morton (0–1)		N/A	11–1
13	April 20	@ Expos	4–2	Wegener (1–0)	**J. Niekro (0–1)**	McGinn (1)	28,025	11–2
14	April 22	@ Pirates	7–5	Hartenstein (1–0)	**Hands (2–1)**		N/A	11–3
15	April 22	@ Pirates	6–5	Dal Canton (2–0)	**Nye (0–1)**	Kline (2)	7,906	11–4
16	April 24	Cardinals	3–2	Giusti (2–1)	**Holtzman (2–1)**		11,656	11–5
17	April 25	@ Mets	3–1	**Jenkins (3–1)**	Seaver (1–2)		18,548	12–5
18	April 26	@ Mets	9–3	**Hands (3–1)**	Cardwell (0–3)		16,252	13–5
19	April 27	@ Mets	8–6	**Regan (4–0)**	Koonce (0–2)		N/A	14–5
20	April 27	@ Mets	3–0	McGraw (2–0)	**Nye (0–2)**		37,437	14–6
21	April 28	@ Phillies	2 – 1 10	**Abernathy (2–0)**	Wise (2–2)		4,438	15–6
22	April 29	@ Phillies	10–0	**Jenkins (4–1)**	Jackson (2–2)		3,811	16–6
23	April 30	@ Phillies	3–1	Fryman (3–1)	**Hands (3–2)**		2,930	16–7

May: 16–9 (Home: 9–4; Away: 7–5)

#	Date	Opponent	Score	Win	Loss	Save	Attendance	Record
24	May 2	Mets	6–4	**Holtzman (3–1)**	Gentry (2–1)	**Regan (2)**	14,702	17–7
25	May 3	Mets	3–2	**Regan (5–0)**	Koonce (0–3)	**Abernathy (2)**	23,228	18–7
26	May 4	Mets	3–2	Seaver (3–2)	**Hands (3–3)**		N/A	18–8
27	May 4	Mets	3–2	McGraw (3–0)	**Selma (2–3)**		40,484	18–9
28	May 6	Dodgers	7–1	**Holtzman (4–1)**	Sutton (3–3)		7,253	19–9
29	May 7	Dodgers	4 – 2 12	Brewer (1–1)	**Jenkins (4–2)**	McBean (2)	9,747	19–10
30	May 9	Giants	11–1	Bolin (2–2)	**Hands (3–4)**	Gibbon (2)	5,189	19–11
31	May 11	Giants	8–0	**Holtzman (5–1)**	Sadecki (2–4)		18,572	20–11
32	May 12	Padres	2–0	**Jenkins (5–2)**	Ross (1–2)		3,887	21–11
33	May 13	Padres	19–0	**Selma (3–3)**	Kelley (2–3)		5,080	22–11
34	May 14	Padres	3–2	**Nottebart (1–0)**	Podres (3–3)		9,622	23–11
35	May 16	@ Astros	11–0	**Holtzman (6–1)**	Dierker (5–4)		17,053	24–11
36	May 17	@ Astros	5–4	Wilson (3–4)	**Nottebart (1–1)**	Gladding (5)	18,307	24–12
37	May 18	@ Astros	6–5	Ray (1–0)	**Regan (5–1)**	Gladding (6)	13,126	24–13
38	May 20	@ Dodgers	7–0	**Holtzman (7–1)**	Sutton (4–4)		21,266	25–13
39	May 21	@ Dodgers	3–1	Osteen (6–2)	**Hands (3–5)**		16,688	25–14
40	May 22	@ Dodgers	3–0	**Jenkins (6–2)**	Singer (5–4)		17,974	26–14
41	May 23	@ Padres	6–0	**Selma (4–3)**	Ross (1–4)		7,936	27–14
42	May 24	@ Padres	7–5	**Abernathy (3–0)**	Kelley (2–4)	**Regan (3)**	4,432	28–14
43	May 25	@ Padres	10–2	Podres (4–3)	**Nye (0–3)**		N/A	28–15
44	May 25	@ Padres	1–0	**Abernathy (4–0)**	J. Niekro (1–3)		13,115	29–15
45	May 27	@ Giants	5–4	Linzy (2–1)	**Regan (5–2)**	Herbel (1)	6,608	29–16
46	May 28	@ Giants	9–8	**Holtzman (8–1)**	Robertson (1–1)	**Regan (4)**	4,447	30–16
47	May 30	Braves	2–0	**Hands (4–5)**	Reed (5–3)		36,075	31–16
48	May 31	Braves	3–2	**Jenkins (7–2)**	P. Niekro (7–4)		29,778	32–16

June: 18–11 (Home: 13–4; Away: 5–7)

#	Date	Opponent	Score	Win	Loss	Save	Attendance	Record
49	June 1	Braves	13–4	**Selma (5–3)**	Jarvis (5–3)		24,349	33–16
50	June 3	Astros	4–2	**Hands (5–5)**	Lemaster (3–7)		8,320	34–16
51	June 4	Astros	5–4	**Jenkins (8–2)**	Griffin (2–3)		13,360	35–16
52	June 6	Reds	14–8	**Holtzman (9–1)**	Cloninger (3–7)	**Regan (5)**	22,185	36–16
53	June 7	Reds	5–5				25,514	36–16
54	June 9	Reds	4–1	Culver (4–4)	**Jenkins (8–3)**	Granger (6)	14,879	36–17
55	June 10	@ Braves	3–1	**Holtzman (10–1)**	Reed (5–5)	**Regan (6)**	27,007	37–17
56	June 11	@ Braves	5–1	P. Niekro (10–4)	**Hands (5–6)**		28,707	37–18
57	June 12	@ Braves	12–6	**Selma (6–3)**	Hill (0–1)	**Abernathy (3)**	27,671	38–18
58	June 13	@ Reds	14 – 8 10	**Regan (6–2)**	Pena (1–1)	**Nye (1)**	17,134	39–18
59	June 14	@ Reds	9 – 8 10	**Regan (7–2)**	Granger (1–2)	**Jenkins (1)**	16,008	40–18
60	June 15	@ Reds	7–6	Carroll (8–3)	**Regan (7–3)**		N/A	40–19
61	June 15	@ Reds	5 – 4 *	**Nye (1–3)**	Arrigo (0–1)	**Johnson (2)**	26,511	41–19
62	June 16	@ Pirates	9–8	Dal Canton (4–0)	**Regan (7–4)**	Blass (1)	8,810	41–20
63	June 17	@ Pirates	1–0	Veale (4–7)	**Jenkins (8–4)**	Dal Canton (3)	N/A	41–21
64	June 17	@ Pirates	4–3	Blass (7–3)	**Abernathy (4–1)**		26,817	41–22
65	June 18	@ Pirates	3 – 2 10	Gibbon (2–3)	**Regan (7–5)**		12,198	41–23
66	June 20	Expos	2–0	**Hands (6–6)**	Robertson (1–4)		18,890	42–23
67	June 21	Expos	3–2	Reed (2–1)	**Jenkins (8–5)**	Shaw (1)	33,750	42–24
68	June 22	Expos	7–6	**Selma (7–3)**	Shaw (1–5)		N/A	43–24
69	June 22	Expos	5 – 4 6	Face (4–1)	**Reynolds (0–1)**	McGinn (2)	22,079	43–25
70	June 23	Pirates	5–4	**Regan (8–5)**	Dal Canton (5–1)		12,500	44–25
71	June 24	Pirates	3–2	**Hands (7–6)**	Bunning (6–5)		17,530	45–25
72	June 25	Pirates	5–2	**Jenkins (9–5)**	Veale (4–8)		26,434	46–25
73	June 26	Pirates	7 – 5 10	**Regan (9–5)**	Dal Canton (5–2)		29,473	47–25
74	June 27	Cardinals	3–1	Carlton (8–5)	**Holtzman (10–2)**		29,224	47–26
75	June 28	Cardinals	3–1	**Hands (8–6)**	Giusti (3–7)		29,285	48–26
76	June 29	Cardinals	3–1	**Jenkins (10–5)**	Gibson (10–5)		N/A	49–26
77	June 29	Cardinals	12–1	**Selma (8–3)**	Grant (4–8)		41,060	50–26
78	June 30	@ Expos	5–2	Reed (3–1)	**Lemonds (0–1)**	McGinn (3)	12,508	50–27

July: 15–14 (Home: 8–7; Away: 7–7)

#	Date	Opponent	Score	Win	Loss	Save	Attendance	Record
79	July 1	@ Expos	11–4	Renko (1–1)	**Holtzman (10–3)**	Face (4)	19,858	50–28
80	July 2	@ Expos	4–2	**Hands (9–6)**	Stoneman (4–11)		16,101	51–28
81	July 3	@ Expos	8–4	**Selma (9–3)**	Wegener (3–6)	**Regan (7)**	12,194	52–28
82	July 4	@ Cardinals	3 – 1 10	**Jenkins (11–5)**	Gibson (10–6)		28,177	53–28
83	July 5	@ Cardinals	5–1	Briles (7–7)	**Holtzman (10–4)**		35,767	53–29
84	July 6	@ Cardinals	4–2	Carlton (10–5)	**Hands (9–7)**	Hoerner (9)	N/A	53–30
85	July 6	@ Cardinals	6–3	Taylor (1–0)	**Nye (1–4)**		48,294	53–31
86	July 8	@ Mets	4–3	Koosman (6–5)	**Jenkins (11–6)**		37,278	53–32
87	July 9	@ Mets	4–0	Seaver (14–3)	**Holtzman (10–5)**		50,709	53–33
88	July 10	@ Mets	6–2	**Hands (10–7)**	Gentry (8–7)		36,012	54–33
89	July 11	Phillies	7–5	Boozer (1–0)	**Abernathy (4–2)**	Wilson (4)	24,509	54–34
90	July 12	Phillies	7–4	**Jenkins (12–6)**	Wise (6–7)	**Regan (8)**	26,732	55–34
91	July 13	Phillies	6–0	**Holtzman (11–5)**	Fryman (8–6)		N/A	56–34
92	July 13	Phillies	6–4	**Colborn (1–0)**	Palmer (1–4)	**Nye (2)**	34,913	57–34
93	July 14	Mets	1–0	**Hands (11–7)**	Seaver (14–4)	**Regan (9)**	37,473	58–34
94	July 15	Mets	5–4	Gentry (9–7)	**Selma (9–4)**	Taylor (8)	38,608	58–35
95	July 16	Mets	9–5	Koonce (4–3)	**Jenkins (12–7)**	Taylor (9)	36,795	58–36
96	July 18	@ Phillies	9–5	**Regan (10–5)**	Wilson (2–3)		16,751	59–36
97	July 19	@ Phillies	5–3	Wise (7–8)	**Hands (11–8)**		4,801	59–37
98	July 20	@ Phillies	1–0	**Jenkins (13–7)**	Jackson (9–10)		N/A	60–37
99	July 20	@ Phillies	6–1	**Selma (10–4)**	Champion (3–5)		12,393	61–37
100	July 24	Dodgers	5–3	**Holtzman (12–5)**	Sutton (12–10)	**Regan (10)**	26,476	62–37
101	July 25	Dodgers	4–2	Osteen (13–8)	**Jenkins (13–8)**	Brewer (16)	20,844	62–38
102	July 26	Dodgers	3 – 2 11	**Regan (11–5)**	Brewer (3–4)		29,172	63–38
103	July 27	Dodgers	6–2	Drysdale (5–3)	**Jenkins (13–9)**	Mikkelsen (1)	30,291	63–39
104	July 28	Giants	4 – 3 10	**Nye (2–4)**	Marichal (13–6)		9,439	64–39
105	July 29	Giants	4–2	Linzy (9–6)	**Abernathy (4–3)**		34,008	64–40
106	July 30	Giants	6–3	Perry (13–7)	**Nye (2–5)**		31,642	64–41
107	July 31	Giants	12–2	**Jenkins (14–9)**	Bolin (5–7)		24,168	65–41

August: 18–11 (Home: 7–7; Away: 11–4)

#	Date	Opponent	Score	Win	Loss	Save	Attendance	Record
108	August 1	Padres	5–2	**Hands (12–8)**	Kirby (3–14)	**Regan (11)**	16,921	66–41
109	August 2	Padres	4–1	**Holtzman (13–5)**	Santorini (4–10)		26,984	67–41
110	August 3	Padres	4–3	**Selma (11–4)**	J. Niekro (6–8)	**Regan (12)**	32,566	68–41
111	August 4	@ Astros	9–3	**Jenkins (15–9)**	Griffin (7–5)		31,722	69–41
112	August 5	@ Astros	5–2	**Hands (13–8)**	Lemaster (8–11)	**Regan (13)**	26,041	70–41
113	August 6	@ Astros	5–4	**Nye (3–5)**	Billingham (4–6)	**Selma (1)**	29,449	71–41
114	August 8	@ Dodgers	5–0	Singer (14–7)	**Jenkins (15–10)**		35,173	71–42
115	August 9	@ Dodgers	4–0	**Hands (14–8)**	Foster (3–7)		48,748	72–42
116	August 10	@ Dodgers	4–2	Sutton (14–11)	**Holtzman (13–6)**	Mikkelsen (2)	27,595	72–43
117	August 12	@ Padres	4–0	**Jenkins (16–10)**	Santorini (4–12)		9,794	73–43
118	August 13	@ Padres	4–2	**Hands (15–8)**	J. Niekro (6–10)		9,625	74–43
119	August 15	@ Giants	3–0	Marichal (14–8)	**Holtzman (13–7)**		12,224	74–44
120	August 16	@ Giants	3–0	**Jenkins (17–10)**	Perry (15–9)		16,236	75–44
121	August 17	@ Giants	5–3	Linzy (10–6)	**Hands (15–9)**		N/A	75–45
122	August 17	@ Giants	3–1	**Selma (12–4)**	Bryant (2–1)	**Regan (14)**	25,586	76–45
123	August 19	Braves	3–0	**Holtzman (14–7)**	P. Niekro (16–11)		37,514	77–45
124	August 20	Braves	6–2	Reed (12–8)	**Jenkins (17–11)**		34,709	77–46
125	August 21	Braves	3–1	Britton (7–4)	**Hands (15–10)**		29,866	77–47
126	August 22	Astros	8–2	Dierker (16–9)	**Selma (12–5)**		19,897	77–48
127	August 23	Astros	11–5	**Holtzman (15–7)**	Gladding (2–4)		27,665	78–48
128	August 24	Astros	10–9	**Regan (12–5)**	Gladding (2–5)	**Aguirre (1)**	N/A	79–48
129	August 24	Astros	3–2	Wilson (16–8)	**Johnson (0–2)**		40,439	79–49
130	August 25	Reds	9–8	Nolan (4–5)	**Hands (15–11)**	Ramos (2)	30,479	79–50
131	August 26	Reds	8–7	Merritt (15–5)	**Selma (12–6)**	Granger (17)	31,473	79–51
132	August 27	Reds	6–3	Cloninger (9–14)	**Holtzman (15–8)**	Carroll (7)	31,867	79–52
133	August 28	Reds	3–1	**Jenkins (18–11)**	Arrigo (2–6)		29,092	80–52
134	August 29	@ Braves	2–1	**Hands (16–11)**	Jarvis (10–9)		36,413	81–52
135	August 30	@ Braves	5–4	**Johnson (1–2)**	Reed (13–9)	**Regan (15)**	26,630	82–52
136	August 31	@ Braves	8–4	**Holtzman (16–8)**	P. Niekro (18–12)	**Regan (16)**	33,142	83–52

September: 8–17 (Home: 4–7; Away: 4–10)

#	Date	Opponent	Score	Win	Loss	Save	Attendance	Record
137	September 2	@ Reds	8–2	**Jenkins (19–11)**	Cloninger (9–15)		11,604	84–52
138	September 3	@ Reds	2–0	Maloney (8–4)	**Hands (16–12)**		5,960	84–53
139	September 5	Pirates	9–2	Blass (14–8)	**Holtzman (16–9)**		10,411	84–54
140	September 6	Pirates	13–4	Veale (11–11)	**Jenkins (19–12)**		24,566	84–55
141	September 7	Pirates	7 – 5 11	Dal Canton (8–2)	**Johnson (1–3)**		28,698	84–56
142	September 8	@ Mets	3–2	Koosman (13–9)	**Hands (16–13)**		43,274	84–57
143	September 9	@ Mets	7–1	Seaver (21–7)	**Jenkins (19–13)**		51,448	84–58
144	September 10	@ Phillies	6–2	Wise (13–11)	**Holtzman (16–10)**		4,164	84–59
145	September 11	@ Phillies	4–3	James (1–0)	**Selma (12–7)**	Jackson (1)	4,255	84–60
146	September 12	@ Cardinals	5–1	**Hands (17–13)**	Taylor (7–3)		31,717	85–60
147	September 13	@ Cardinals	7–4	Grant (8–11)	**Jenkins (19–14)**	Hoerner (15)	46,548	85–61
148	September 14	@ Cardinals	2 – 1 10	Gibson (18–11)	**Holtzman (16–11)**		43,764	85–62
149	September 15	@ Expos	8–2	Wegener (5–12)	**Selma (12–8)**		12,011	85–63
150	September 16	@ Expos	5–4	**Hands (18–13)**	Robertson (5–14)	**Regan (17)**	5,216	86–63
151	September 17	Phillies	9–7	**Jenkins (20–14)**	Champion (5–10)	**Nye (3)**	6,062	87–63
152	September 18	Phillies	5–3	Jackson (13–16)	**Regan (12–6)**		5,796	87–64
153	September 19	Cardinals	2 – 1 10	**Holtzman (17–11)**	Gibson (18–12)		N/A	88–64
154	September 19	Cardinals	7–2	Torrez (9–4)	**Selma (12–9)**		15,376	88–65
155	September 20	Cardinals	4–1	Carlton (17–10)	**Hands (18–14)**	Grant (7)	28,194	88–66
156	September 21	Cardinals	4–3	**Jenkins (21–14)**	Taylor (7–5)		28,287	89–66
157	September 23	Expos	7–3	Stoneman (11–18)	**Holtzman (17–12)**		3,047	89–67
158	September 24	Expos	6–3	**Hands (19–14)**	Renko (6–7)		2,217	90–67
159	September 26	@ Pirates	2–0	Ellis (11–17)	**Jenkins (21–15)**		4,973	90–68
160	September 27	@ Pirates	4–1	Blass (16–10)	**Holtzman (17–13)**	Moose (4)	4,157	90–69
161	September 28	@ Pirates	3–1	**Hands (20–14)**	Veale (13–14)		24,435	91–69

October: 1–1 (Home: 1–1; Away: 0–0)

#	Date	Opponent	Score	Win	Loss	Save	Attendance	Record
162	October 1	Mets	6 – 5 12	Taylor (9–4)	**Selma (12–10)**	Johnson (1)	10,136	91–70
163	October 2	Mets	5–3	**Decker (1–0)**	Cardwell (8–10)		9,981	92–70

Legend: = Win = Loss = Tie = Postponement = Eliminated
Bold = Cubs team member

== Player stats ==
= Indicates team leader

=== Batting ===
==== Starters by position ====
Note: Pos. = Position; G = Games played; AB = At bats; R = Runs; H = Hits; HR = Home runs; RBI = Runs batted in; Avg. = Batting average; SB = Stolen bases

Pos.	Player	G	AB	R	H	Avg.	HR	RBI	SB
C	Randy Hundley	151	522	67	133	.255	18	64	2
1B	Ernie Banks	155	565	60	143	.253	23	106	0
2B	Glenn Beckert	131	543	69	158	.273	4	53	6
3B	Ron Santo	160	575	97	166	.289	29	123	1
SS	Don Kessinger	158	664	109	181	.273	4	53	11
OF	Billy Williams	163	642	103	188	.293	21	95	3
OF	Don Young	101	272	36	65	.239	6	27	1
OF	Jim Hickman	134	338	38	80	.237	21	54	2

==== Other batters ====
Note: G = Games played; AB = At bats; H = Hits; Avg. = Batting average; HR = Home runs; RBI = Runs batted in

Player	G	AB	H	Avg.	HR	RBI
Al Spangler	82	213	45	.211	4	23
Willie Smith	103	195	48	.246	9	25
Paul Popovich	60	154	48	.312	1	14
Jim Qualls	43	120	30	.250	0	9
Oscar Gamble	24	71	16	.225	1	5
Adolfo Phillips	28	49	11	.224	0	1
Nate Oliver	44	44	7	.159	1	4
Ken Rudolph	27	34	7	.206	1	6
Bill Heath	27	32	5	.156	0	1
Gene Oliver	23	27	6	.222	0	0
Jimmie Hall	11	24	5	.208	0	1
Rick Bladt	10	13	2	.154	0	1
Manny Jiménez	6	6	1	.167	0	0
Johnny Hairston	3	4	1	.250	0	0
Randy Bobb	3	2	0	.000	0	0
Charley Smith	2	2	0	.000	0	0

=== Pitching ===
= Indicates league leader

==== Starting pitchers ====
Note: G = Games pitched; IP = Innings pitched; W = Wins; L = Losses; ERA = Earned run average; SO = Strikeouts

Player	G	IP	W	L	ERA	SO
Ferguson Jenkins	43	311.1	21	15	3.21	273
Bill Hands	41	300.0	20	14	2.49	181
Ken Holtzman	39	261.1	17	13	3.58	176
Dick Selma	36	168.2	10	8	3.63	161
Archie Reynolds	2	7.1	0	1	2.45	4

==== Other pitchers ====
Note: G = Games pitched; IP = Innings pitched; W = Wins; L = Losses; ERA = Earned run average; SO = Strikeouts

Player	G	IP	W	L	ERA	SO
Joe Niekro	4	19.1	0	1	3.72	7
Jim Colborn	6	14.2	1	0	3.07	4
Joe Decker	4	12.1	1	0	2.92	13
Dave Lemonds	2	4.2	0	1	3.86	0
Gary Ross	2	2.0	0	0	13.50	2

==== Relief pitchers ====
Note: G = Games pitched; W = Wins; L = Losses; SV = Saves; ERA = Earned run average; SO = Strikeouts

Player	G	W	L	SV	ERA	SO
Phil Regan	71	12	6	17	3.70	56
Ted Abernathy	56	4	3	3	3.16	55
Hank Aguirre	41	1	0	1	2.60	19
Rich Nye	34	3	5	3	5.11	39
Don Nottebart	16	1	1	0	7.00	8
Ken Johnson	9	1	2	1	2.84	18
Alec Distaso	2	0	0	0	3.86	1

== Awards and honors ==
=== League leaders ===
- Ferguson Jenkins – National League leader, strikeouts (273)

=== All-Stars ===
All-Star Game

- Don Kessinger, starting shortstop
- Ron Santo, starting third baseman
- Ernie Banks, reserve
- Glenn Beckert, reserve
- Randy Hundley, reserve

== Farm system ==
Level	Team	League	Manager
AAA	Tacoma Cubs	Pacific Coast League	Whitey Lockman
AA	San Antonio Missions	Texas League	Jim Marshall
A	Quincy Cubs	Midwest League	Walt Dixon
A-Short Season	Huron Cubs	Northern League	Mel Wright
Rookie	Caldwell Cubs	Pioneer League	George Freese

LEAGUE CHAMPIONS: Tacoma
