= 1959 International League season =

- League: International League
- Sport: Baseball
- Duration: April 14 – September 22
- Games: 154
- Teams: 8

Regular season
- Season MVP: Pancho Herrera, Buffalo Bisons

Governors' Cup Playoffs
- League champions: Havana Sugar Kings
- Runners-up: Richmond Virginians

IL seasons
- ← 1958 1960 →

The 1959 International League was a Class AAA baseball season played between April 14 and September 22. Eight teams played a 154-game schedule, with the top four teams qualifying for the post-season.

The Havana Sugar Kings won the Governors' Cup, defeating the Richmond Virginians in the final round of the playoffs.

== Team changes ==
- The Buffalo Bisons end their affiliation with the Kansas City Athletics and begin an affiliation with the Philadelphia Phillies.
- The Miami Marlins end their affiliation with the Philadelphia Phillies and begin an affiliation with the Baltimore Orioles.

== Teams ==
1959 International League
| Team | City | MLB Affiliate | Stadium |
| Buffalo Bisons | Buffalo, New York | Philadelphia Phillies | Offermann Stadium |
| Columbus Jets | Columbus, Ohio | Pittsburgh Pirates | Jets Stadium |
| Havana Sugar Kings | Havana, Cuba | Cincinnati Reds | Gran Stadium |
| Miami Marlins | Miami, Florida | Baltimore Orioles | Miami Stadium |
| Montreal Royals | Montreal, Quebec | Los Angeles Dodgers | Delorimier Stadium |
| Richmond Virginians | Richmond, Virginia | New York Yankees | Parker Field |
| Rochester Red Wings | Rochester, New York | St. Louis Cardinals | Red Wing Stadium |
| Toronto Maple Leafs | Toronto, Ontario | None | Maple Leaf Stadium |

== Map of teams ==
International League teams

== Regular season ==
=== Summary ===
- The Buffalo Bisons finished with the best record in the league for the first time since 1949.

=== Standings ===
International League
| Team | Win | Loss | % | GB |
|---|---|---|---|---|
| Buffalo Bisons | 89 | 64 | .582 | – |
| Columbus Jets | 84 | 70 | .545 | 5.5 |
| Havana Sugar Kings | 80 | 73 | .523 | 9 |
| Richmond Virginians | 76 | 78 | .494 | 13.5 |
| Rochester Red Wings | 74 | 80 | .481 | 15.5 |
| Montreal Royals | 72 | 82 | .468 | 17.5 |
| Miami Marlins | 71 | 83 | .461 | 18.5 |
| Toronto Maple Leafs | 69 | 85 | .448 | 20.5 |

== League Leaders ==
=== Batting leaders ===
| Stat | Player | Total |
|---|---|---|
| AVG | Pancho Herrera, Buffalo Bisons | .329 |
| H | Pancho Herrera, Buffalo Bisons | 187 |
| R | Bobby Del Greco, Buffalo Bisons | 109 |
| 2B | Woody Smith, Miami Marlins | 49 |
| 3B | Tony González, Havana Sugar Kings | 16 |
| HR | Pancho Herrera, Buffalo Bisons | 37 |
| RBI | Pancho Herrera, Buffalo Bisons | 128 |
| SB | Larry Raines, Toronto Maple Leafs | 32 |

=== Pitching leaders ===
| Stat | Player | Total |
|---|---|---|
| W | Bob Keegan, Rochester Red Wings | 18 |
| L | Babe Birrer, Montreal Royals; Harry Byrd, Miami Marlins | 16 |
| ERA | Artie Kay, Miami Marlins | 2.08 |
| CG | Jim Archer, Miami Marlins | 16 |
| SHO | Joe Gibbon, Columbus Jets; Al Jackson, Columbus Jets | 4 |
| SO | Joe Gibbon, Columbus Jets | 152 |
| IP | Bob Keegan, Rochester Red Wings | 234.0 |

== Playoffs ==
- The Havana Sugar Kings won their first Governors' Cup, defeating the Richmond Virginians in six games.

=== Playoff bracket ===
Semi-finals
1 | Buffalo | 1
4 | Richmond | 4
2 | Columbus | 0
3 | Havana | 4

Governors' Cup
4 | Richmond | 2
3 | Havana | 4

== Awards ==
Player awards
| Award name | Recipient |
|---|---|
| Most Valuable Player | Pancho Herrera, Buffalo Bisons |
| Pitcher of the Year | Bill Short, Richmond Virginians |
| Rookie of the Year | Charlie James, Rochester Red Wings |

== See also ==
- 1959 Major League Baseball season
