= 1956 International League season =

- League: International League
- Sport: Baseball
- Duration: April 18 – September 25
- Games: 154
- Teams: 8

Regular season
- Season MVP: Mike Goliat, Toronto Maple Leafs

Governors' Cup Playoffs
- League champions: Rochester Red Wings
- Runners-up: Toronto Maple Leafs

IL seasons
- ← 1955 1957 →

The 1956 International League was a Class AAA baseball season played between April 18 and September 25. Eight teams played a 154-game schedule, with the top four teams qualifying for the post-season.

The Rochester Red Wings won the Governors' Cup, defeating the Toronto Maple Leafs in the final round of the playoffs.

== Team changes ==
- The Syracuse Chiefs relocated to Miami, Florida and were renamed the Miami Marlins. The club continued their affiliation with the Philadelphia Phillies.
- The Buffalo Bisons ended their affiliation with the Detroit Tigers.
- The Richmond Virginians begin their affiliation with the New York Yankees.

== Teams ==
1956 International League
Team	City	MLB Affiliate	Stadium
Buffalo Bisons	Buffalo, New York	None	Offermann Stadium
Columbus Jets	Columbus, Ohio	Kansas City Athletics	Jets Stadium
Havana Sugar Kings	Havana, Cuba	Cincinnati Reds	Gran Stadium
Miami Marlins	Miami, Florida	Philadelphia Phillies	Miami Stadium
Montreal Royals	Montreal, Quebec	Brooklyn Dodgers	Delorimier Stadium
Richmond Virginians	Richmond, Virginia	New York Yankees	Parker Field
Rochester Red Wings	Rochester, New York	St. Louis Cardinals	Red Wing Stadium
Toronto Maple Leafs	Toronto, Ontario	None	Maple Leaf Stadium

== Map of teams ==
International League teams

== Regular season ==
=== Summary ===
- The Toronto Maple Leafs finished in first place for the second time in three seasons.

=== Standings ===
International League
Team	Win	Loss	%	GB
Toronto Maple Leafs	86	66	.566	–
Rochester Red Wings	83	67	.553	2
Miami Marlins	80	71	.530	5.5
Montreal Royals	80	72	.526	6
Richmond Virginians	74	79	.484	12.5
Havana Sugar Kings	72	82	.468	15
Columbus Jets	69	84	.451	17.5
Buffalo Bisons	64	87	.424	21.5

== League Leaders ==
=== Batting leaders ===
Stat	Player	Total
AVG	Clyde Parris, Montreal Royals	.321
H	Len Johnston, Richmond Virginians	182
R	Sam Jethroe, Toronto Maple Leafs	105
2B	Bob Wilson, Montreal Royals	43
3B	Russ Sullivan, Columbus Jets	11
HR	Luke Easter, Buffalo Bisons	35
RBI	Luke Easter, Buffalo Bisons	106
SB	Len Johnston, Richmond Virginians	40

=== Pitching leaders ===
Stat	Player	Total
W	Lynn Lovenguth, Toronto Maple Leafs	24
L	Frank White, Montreal Royals	14
ERA	Ed Blake, Toronto Maple Leafs	2.61
CG	Lynn Lovenguth, Toronto Maple Leafs	25
SHO	Ed Blake, Toronto Maple Leafs	6
SO	Seth Morehead, Miami Marlins	168
IP	Lynn Lovenguth, Toronto Maple Leafs	279.0

== Playoffs ==
- The Rochester Red Wings won their second consecutive Governors' Cup, and fourth overall, defeating the Toronto Maple Leafs in seven games.

=== Playoff bracket ===
Semi-finals
1	Toronto	4
4	Montreal	1
2	Rochester	4
3	Miami	1

Governors' Cup
1	Toronto	3
2	Rochester	4

== Awards ==
Player awards
Award name	Recipient
Most Valuable Player	Mike Goliat, Toronto Maple Leafs
Pitcher of the Year	Lynn Lovenguth, Toronto Maple Leafs
Rookie of the Year	Fred Kipp, Montreal Royals

== See also ==
- 1956 Major League Baseball season
