= Miami Marlins (disambiguation) =

The Miami Marlins are a Major League Baseball team based in Miami, Florida.

Miami Marlins may also refer to:

- Miami Marlins (Florida State League), also known as Miami Orioles and Miami Miracle, a baseball team in the Florida State League from 1962 to 1991
- Miami Marlins (International League), a baseball team in the International League from 1956 to 1960
