= Lindy McDaniel =

American baseball player (1935–2020)

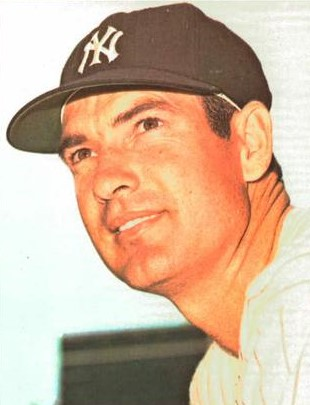
- McDaniel with the New York Yankees in 1971
- Pitcher
- Born: December 13, 1935; Hollis, Oklahoma, U.S.
- Died: November 14, 2020 (aged 84); Carrollton, Texas, U.S.
- Batted: Right Threw: Right

MLB debut
- September 2, 1955, for the St. Louis Cardinals

Last MLB appearance
- September 27, 1975, for the Kansas City Royals

MLB statistics
- Win–loss record: 141–119
- Earned run average: 3.45
- Strikeouts: 1,361
- Saves: 174
- Stats at Baseball Reference

Teams
- St. Louis Cardinals (1955–1962); Chicago Cubs (1963–1965); San Francisco Giants (1966–1968); New York Yankees (1968–1973); Kansas City Royals (1974–1975)

Career highlights and awards
- 2× All-Star (1960, 1960²)

Lyndall Dale McDaniel (December 13, 1935 – November 14, 2020), known as Lindy McDaniel, was an American professional baseball pitcher who had a 21-year career in Major League Baseball from 1955 to 1975. During his career, he witnessed approximately 3,500 major league games (not including spring training), had more than 300 teammates, and played under eight different managers. He attended the University of Oklahoma and Abilene Christian College, then played with the St. Louis Cardinals, Chicago Cubs, and San Francisco Giants (all of the National League), and the New York Yankees and Kansas City Royals (both of the American League). He stood 6 ft 3 in and was listed at 195 lb. (88kg). McDaniel was a minister for the Church of Christ.

== Early life ==
McDaniel was born on December 13, 1935, in Hollis, Oklahoma. He was named after Charles Lindbergh, and had two brothers and one sister. His brother Von McDaniel would go on to pitch for the St. Louis Cardinals, and another brother Kerry Don "Butch" McDaniel pitched in minor league baseball. Their father Newell McDaniel was an accomplished tennis player. College football Hall of Fame coach Darrell Royal was his cousin.

McDaniel attended the University of Oklahoma for one year, on a basketball scholarship, and also played baseball. His father Newell and mother Ada Mae (Burk) McDaniel were deeply observant Christians, and his mother did not go along easily with allowing her son to enter the world of professional baseball when he was being pursued by professional baseball teams.

== Baseball career ==
=== St. Louis Cardinals ===
The St. Louis Cardinals signed McDaniel as an amateur free agent on August 19, 1955. He received a $50,000 signing bonus, and under the rules for "bonus babies" at the time had to be included on the signing team's major league roster, rather than being sent to the minor leagues. McDaniel spent his first two full seasons (1956-57) with the Cardinals. In 1958, he pitched in six games for the Triple-A Omaha Cardinals, with at 4–1 won–loss record in six starts. These were his only minor league games.

After pitching in four games at the end of the 1955 season, McDaniel pitched in 39 games for the Cardinals in 1956, with seven starts, a 7–6 record and 3.40 earned run average (ERA). In 1957, he started 26 games, with a 15–9 record and 3.49 ERA. He and his brother Von were teammates with the Cardinals in 1957-58. McDaniel's performance declined in 1958, and he was demoted to Omaha in August. His major league 5.80 ERA that season would be the worst of his career.

He rebounded in 1959 with a 14–12 record and 3.82 ERA, starting 7 games and pitching 55 games as a relief pitcher. He had 16 saves, leading all major league pitchers. McDaniel had been moved to the bullpen after a number of unsuccessful starts early in the season. He began to excel as a relief pitcher with the addition of a forkball to his pitching arsenal. This was the year before The Sporting News created the Fireman of the Year Award (recognizing the top relief pitcher in each league; which in 2001 became the Reliever of the Year Award).

McDaniel considered his top overall year as 1960 with the Cardinals. He pitched in 65 games (63 as a relief pitcher) and logged a 12–2 mark in relief (12–4 overall), with 27 saves and an overall ERA of 2.09 in 116.1 innings pitched. As a starter, he lost two games while giving up 12 runs in 12 innings, giving him a 1.29 ERA as a relief pitcher (15 earned runs over 104.1 innings). His 27 saves led all major league pitchers for the second consecutive year. With nine saves and a 0.74 ERA, McDaniel was named the Player of the Month for June 1960.

McDaniel was named (for the only time in his career) to the National League All-Star Team, and was selected for both All-Star Games in 1960, pitching one inning in the July 13 game. He earned The Sporting News' inaugural NL Fireman of the Year honors, while finishing third for the Cy Young Award and fifth in Most Valuable Player (MVP) voting, both his highest placings. He was the first relief pitcher to ever receive a vote for the Cy Young Award.

In the next two seasons (1961 and 1962), McDaniel pitched 55 and 53 games in relief, respectively; but his performance declined. While he had a 10–6 record in 1961, his ERA jumped to 4.87 and his saves fell to 9. The following year, his record was 3–10, with a 4.12 ERA and 14 saves.

=== Chicago Cubs ===
After the 1962 season ended, the Cardinals traded McDaniel along with Larry Jackson and Jimmie Schaffer to the Chicago Cubs for George Altman, Don Cardwell and Moe Thacker. In 1963 for the Cubs, he appeared in 57 games, all in relief. He had a 13–7 record, with a 2.86 ERA and led the National League in saves (22) and games finished (48). He was once again named The Sporting News' NL Fireman of the Year.

He had 16 saves in 63 appearances for the Cubs in 1964. In 1965, he appeared in 71 games and had a 2.59 ERA, but with only two saves, as teammate Ted Abernathy had become the team’s closer (with 31 saves in 84 games).

=== San Francisco Giants ===
After the end of the 1965 season, the Cubs traded McDaniel along with Don Landrum to the San Francisco Giants for Randy Hundley and Bill Hands. His best year with the Giants was 1966. In 32 appearances, he was 10–5, with a 2.66 ERA and six saves in a 121.2 innings pitched. His performance declined in 1967 due to a sore shoulder, and he had a 7.45 ERA in early July of the 1968 season when the Giants traded him.

=== New York Yankees ===
The Giants traded him to the Yankees on July 12, 1968 for Bill Monbouquette. He finished the 1968 season 4–1 with a 1.75 ERA and 10 saves in 24 games for the fifth place Yankees. In 1969, he pitched 51 games in relief with a 5–6 record, 3.55 ERA and only five saves for the Yankees.

After his 1960 season, McDaniel ranked his next-best year as 1970 with the Yankees, when he was 9–5 with a career high 29 saves (second in the AL) and a 2.01 ERA, followed by the 1963 season when he was 13–7 with 21 saves and a 2.86 ERA. His 29 saves tied the franchise record set by Luis Arroyo in 1961.

He pitched three more years for the Yankees. In 1973, nearing 38-years old, he pitched 47 games (including three starts and one complete game), with a 12–6 record, 10 saves and a 2.86 ERA. As the only New York Yankee pitcher to homer in the 1972 season, McDaniel became the last Yankee hurler to hit a home run before the advent of the designated hitter in 1973. That home run (which occurred on September 28, 1972 in Detroit) was also the last one hit by a pitcher at Tiger Stadium.

=== Kansas City Royals ===
After the end of the 1973 season, the Yankees traded McDaniel to the Kansas City Royals for Lou Piniella and Ken Wright. Piniella would go on to play an important role in the Yankees 1977–1978 championship seasons. In two years with the Royals, he pitched in 78 games with a 6–5 record before retiring after 21 years in the major leagues.

== Legacy ==
For his 21-year major league career, McDaniel had a 141–119 record, 3.45 ERA, 174 saves and 1,361 strikeouts in 2,139 1/3 innings. In 1960, he was fourth among all major league pitchers in wins above replacement (WAR) at 5.9.

McDaniel's personal highlight came on June 6, 1963, in a Cubs game against the Giants. He was called on to pitch in the 10th inning, with the game tied and the bases loaded. He picked future Hall of Fame great and future teammate Willie Mays off second base, and then struck out Ed Bailey to end the inning without allowing a run to score. McDaniel, the first batter in the bottom of the 10th inning, hit a home run to win the game (which also put the Cubs into a tie with the Giants for first place at that point in the season).

Over a four-game span, McDaniel retired 32 straight hitters in August 1968 for the Yankees, tying an AL record at the time. In one of those games, on August 23, he pitched seven perfect innings against the Detroit Tigers. On August 4, 1973, he entered the game in the second inning against the Tigers in Detroit, because starter Fritz Peterson had pulled a muscle in his right thigh in the first inning. McDaniel pitched 13 innings, giving up one run and six hits, winning the game 2–1 on Horace Clarke's first home run of the year in the top of the 14th inning. McDaniel pitched in 225 consecutive games in the National League without committing an error, a record.

McDaniel held the MLB record for most batters faced in the eighth inning over his career. He allowed four walk-off grand slams during his career, more than any other major league pitcher on record.

As of 2025, McDaniel holds the distinction of having pitched in the most regular season games (987) without a postseason appearance of any pitcher in MLB history, 187 games clear of next-highest Francisco Cordero.

== Personal life ==
McDaniel was deeply religious. He attended Abilene Christian College and Florida Christian College during off-seasons, ultimately becoming a minister for the Church of Christ. At the time he retired, McDaniel planned to take up farming with his father; and he stated that while all he had known professionally in life was baseball it was not the center of his life. Rather, "God, family and friends come first".

== Death ==
McDaniel died from COVID-19 on November 14, 2020, during the COVID-19 pandemic in Texas. He was 84.

== See also ==
- List of St. Louis Cardinals team records
- The Sporting News Reliever of the Year Award
- List of Major League Baseball annual saves leaders

Awards
Preceded by Roberto Clemente	Major League Player of the Month; June 1960	Succeeded by Don Drysdale
Preceded by none Roy Face	Sporting News National League Reliever of the Year; 1960; 1963	Succeeded by Stu Miller; Al McBean
