= Alec Distaso =

American baseball player (1948–2009)

- Pitcher
- Born: December 23, 1948; Los Angeles, California, U.S.
- Died: July 13, 2009 (aged 60); Macomb, Illinois, U.S.
- Batted: Right Threw: Right

MLB debut
- April 20, 1969, for the Chicago Cubs

Last MLB appearance
- April 22, 1969, for the Chicago Cubs

MLB statistics
- Win–loss record: 0–0
- Earned run average: 3.86
- Innings pitched: 4 2/3
- Stats at Baseball Reference

Teams
- Chicago Cubs (1969)

Alec John Distaso (December 23, 1948 – July 13, 2009) was an American professional baseball player, a right-handed pitcher who appeared in two games played for Chicago Cubs of Major League Baseball in 1969. The native of Los Angeles, stood 6 feet 2 inches (1.88 m) tall and weighed 200 pounds (91 kg).

Distaso's professional career, curtailed by elbow miseries, lasted four seasons (1967–1970), all in the Cubs' organization. After winning 13 games for the Class A Quincy Cubs in 1968, he was included on Chicago's 1969 opening season roster and appeared in two games as a relief pitcher in April. In the first, he hurled two scoreless innings against the expansion edition of the Montreal Expos. This game also made Distaso the first MLB player to make their debut in Canada (Ken Rudolph also debuted in this game on the Cubs, but he was a pinch hitter in the 9th inning while Distaso entered the game in the 5th). In the second, he allowed two earned runs in 2 2/3 innings against the Pittsburgh Pirates, a double by the Pirates' Bob Robertson the most damaging blow.

He then was sent back to the minor leagues. Some weeks afterward, he hurt his elbow. Distaso tried to pitch through the injury but enjoyed only sporadic success, never enough to warrant a return to the majors. He quit baseball in the spring of 1971.

After retiring as an active player, Distaso became a police officer and then a detective for the Los Angeles Police Department, retiring in 1994. In 1996, he became a public housing administrator in Macomb, Illinois. Distaso died of cancer in 2009.
