= Sue Raney =

American jazz singer (born 1940)

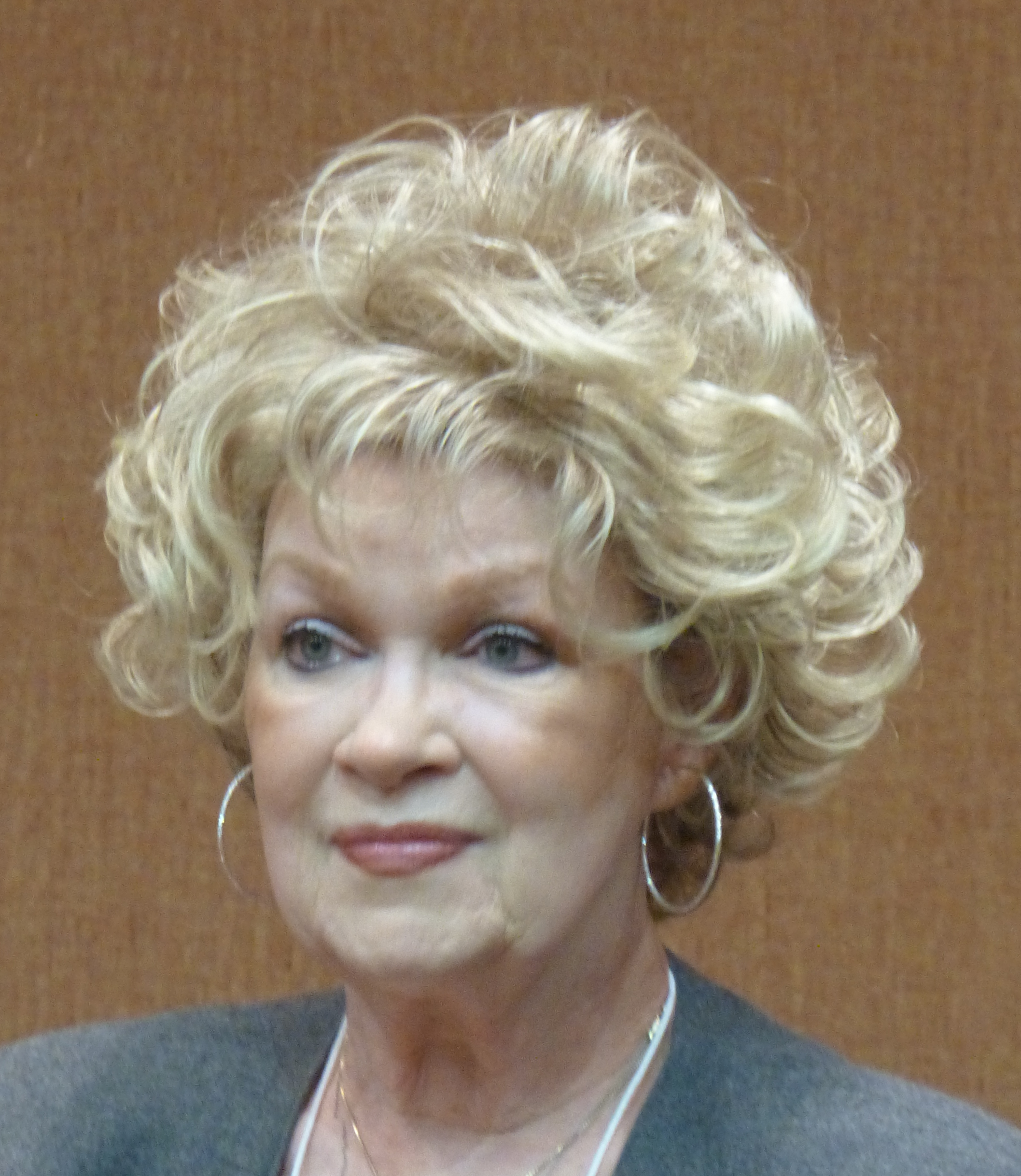
- Raney in 2013

Background information
- Born: Raelene Claire Claussen; June 18, 1940 (age 85)
- Genres: Jazz; big band
- Years active: 1957–present
- Labels: Capitol; Discovery; Imperial; Fresh Sound

Raelene Claire Claussen, known professionally as Sue Raney (born June 18, 1940, in McPherson, Kansas), is an American jazz singer. Raney was signed by Capitol Records in 1957 at age 17. That same year, she recorded her debut album, When Your Lover Has Gone, produced by Nelson Riddle.

== Biography ==
Raney was born to Richard LeRoy Claussen (1913–1967) and Mildred Augusta Vonderfecht (maiden; 1915–2005). She began singing at age four, and, encouraged by her mother, began singing professionally before becoming a teenager. When she was nearly 14, she joined Jack Carson's radio show in Los Angeles in 1954 and later worked on television as the singer in Ray Anthony's band. In 1960, Raney recorded, "Biology" – Bill Holman directing – which became Capitol's first single elevated to national promotion after introducing it in regional pre-testing that same year. Raney was featured with the Stan Kenton orchestra in 1962 on the hour-long television special Music of 1960s.

Raney sang the theme song to the 1967 psychological thriller film Wait Until Dark, starring Audrey Hepburn. The song, bearing the title of the film, was composed by Henry Mancini, lyrics by Jay Livingston and Ray Evans. Raney voiced Patti Bear in The Great Bear Scare (1983), an animated Halloween sequel to The Bear Who Slept Through Christmas. Her single "Early Morning Blues and Greens" was played on easy-listening stations, peaking at No. 16 on the Billboard magazine MOR chart. She sang "The Star-Spangled Banner" at Dodger Stadium before the sixth game of the 1978 World Series. At the time, she was married to Ed Yelin of Capitol Records. She also performed on three albums titled Supersax and LA Voices, Vol. 1 (1983), Vol. 2 (1984), and Vol. 3 (1986). The LA Voices of Volume 1 received a Grammy nomination for the 26th Annual Grammy Awards in the category "Best Jazz Vocal Performance, Duo or Group".

== Family ==
Raney, on September 2, 1966, married Edward Yelin (né Edward Marsey Levey; 1928–2015), who, at one time, had been an A&R Vice President for Capitol Records. Yelin had been one of her managers. Yelin was a former jazz trumpeter. After divorcing Yelin in the 1980s, she remarried, to Carmen Fanzone, a trumpeter and former major league baseball player for the Boston Red Sox and Chicago Cubs. From her first marriage, she has two stepsons, Mark Raymond Yelin (born 1953) and Lee Philip Yelin (born 1956).

== Discography ==
With Nelson Riddle and His Orchestra

- When Your Lover Has Gone (Capitol, 1957; Cap T964)

With Billy May and His Orchestra

- Songs for a Raney Day (Capitol, 1960)

With Ralph Carmichael and His Orchestra

- All by Myself (Capitol, 1963)
- Happiness Is a Warm Sue Raney (Philips, 1964)
- Sue Raney's People Tree (Light, 1972)

With orchestra, Billy Byers conducting

- New and Now! (Imperial, 1967)

With the Bob Florence Trio

- Sings the Music of Johnny Mandel (Discovery, 1983)
- Flight of Fancy: A Journey of Alan & Marilyn Bergman (Discovery, 1986)
- Quietly There (Discovery, 1987)
- Ridin' High with Bob Florence (Discovery, 1984), musicians include her new husband, Carmen Fanzone (flugelhorn), Bob Magnusson (bass), and Nick Ceroli (drums)

With studio orchestra conducted by Alan Broadbent

- Dreamsville: Sue Raney Sings The Music Of Henry Mancini (Discovery, 1988)

With Alan Broadbent

- Listen Here (Rhombus, 2010)

With Kenny Rankin

- Professional Dreamer (Private Music, 1995)

With Dick Shreve (piano) and Bob Magnusson (bass)

- Autumn in the Air (Fresh Sound, 1997)

With various artists

- Alive and in Love (Imperial, 1965)
- With a Little Help from My Friends (Imperial, 1968)
- In Good Company (Discovery, 1992)
- Heart's Desire: A Tribute to Doris Day (Fresh Sound, 2006)
- Late in Life (Fresh Sound, 2014)
- Christmas Lady (Fresh Sound, 2016)

== Bibliography ==
=== References ===
- Leonard Feather (April 8, 1984). "The Jazz Singer Almost Nobody Knows". Focus Magazine. Vol. 5, no. 30. p. 11 – via Newspapers.com.
- Levinson, Peter J. (2001). "Chapter 7: A Flourishing Career". September in the Rain: The Life of Nelson Riddle. New York: Billboard Books, an imprint of Watson-Guptill Publications. p. 185. ISBN 0-8230-7672-5. LCCN 2001035450. OCLC 46822475 – via Internet Archive.
- "UA Studio Jazz Ensemble With the Arizona Symphony Orchestra" (PDF). University of Arizona College of Fine Arts (program notes). March 9, 2012. (University of Arizona School of Music's 34th Annual AzJazz Week)
- Yanow, Scott (n.d.). "Sue Raney (biography)". AllMusic.
- Zhito, Lee (June 6, 1960). "Music as Written: Hollywood". Billboard (column). Vol. 72, no. 23. pp. 18 & 21 – via Google Books. "Single had passed the test in the Southeastern region, covering the Miami, Atlanta, Memphis and New Orleans markets. First single to jump from its regional testing grounds to national distribution was Sue Raney's 'Biology.'"
