= Clint Compton =

American baseball player (born 1950)

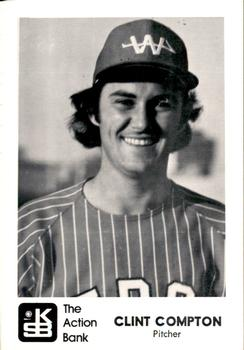
- Pitcher
- Born: November 1, 1950 (age 75); Montgomery, Alabama, U.S.
- Batted: Right Threw: Right

MLB debut
- October 3, 1972, for the Chicago Cubs

Last MLB appearance
- October 3, 1972, for the Chicago Cubs

MLB statistics
- Earned run average: 9.00
- Win–loss record: 0–0
- Strikeouts: 0
- Stats at Baseball Reference

Teams
- Chicago Cubs (1972)

Robert Clinton Compton (born November 1, 1950) is an American former left-handed pitcher in Major League Baseball who played for the Chicago Cubs. His entire major-league career consisted of a two-inning appearance during the Cubs' October 3, 1972 game against the Philadelphia Phillies.

Compton was drafted in the 3rd round of the 1968 MLB June amateur draft out of Robert E. Lee High School, 13 picks before future All-Star Lynn McGlothen. After his second season in the Braves' minor league system, he was traded with Mickey Rivers to the California Angels for Bob Priddy and future Hall of Famer Hoyt Wilhelm. The Cubs selected Compton from the Angels in the 1971 Rule 5 draft and he spent the 1972 season with the AA Midland Cubs before a late-season call-up.

On October 3, 1972, Compton came on in relief of Cub hurler Larry Gura in the top of the 6th at Wrigley Field. He retired the side in order (John Bateman, Steve Carlton, and Terry Harmon) in the 6th but quickly got into trouble in the 7th. Larry Bowa singled to lead it off, followed by a Mike Schmidt single in Schmidt's first at-bat of the game. A walk to Greg Luzinski loaded the bases with nobody out, and another walk (to Joe Lis) forced in the Phillies' ninth run of the game. Compton then induced Roger Freed to ground into a run-scoring double play before Bill Robinson popped out to Carmen Fanzone for the final out of Compton's appearance, and as it would turn out, his major league career. Carlton earned his 27th win that day to finish with a 27–10 record for the last-place Phillies, which would earn him the Cy Young Award.

Compton spent all of 1973 with the Cubs' AAA affiliate Wichita Aeros but did not get promoted to the big league club. He never played professional baseball again, retiring from the game after 1973 at age 22.
