= Randy Hundley =

American baseball player (born 1942)

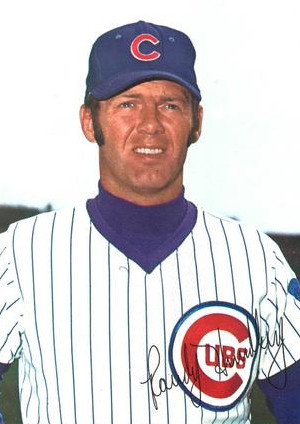
- Catcher
- Born: June 1, 1942 (age 84); Martinsville, Virginia, U.S.
- Batted: Right Threw: Right

MLB debut
- September 27, 1964, for the San Francisco Giants

Last MLB appearance
- September 25, 1977, for the Chicago Cubs

MLB statistics
- Batting average: .236
- Home runs: 82
- Runs batted in: 381
- Stats at Baseball Reference

Teams
- San Francisco Giants (1964–1965); Chicago Cubs (1966–1973); Minnesota Twins (1974); San Diego Padres (1975); Chicago Cubs (1976–1977)

Career highlights and awards
- All-Star (1969); Gold Glove Award (1967); Chicago Cubs Hall of Fame

Cecil Randolph Hundley Jr. (born June 1, 1942) is an American former professional baseball player and coach. He played in Major League Baseball as a catcher from 1964 to 1977, most prominently as a member of the Chicago Cubs, where he was the starting catcher for eight seasons. A Gold Glove Award winner in 1967 and an All-Star in 1969, Hundley was considered the Cubs' team leader during the late 1960s and early 1970s. Hundley was regarded as one of the best defensive catchers of his era, and the best Cubs catcher since Gabby Hartnett in 1940. He introduced a one-handed catching style that was soon copied by other Major League catchers.

Hundley also played for the San Francisco Giants, Chicago Cubs, Minnesota Twins, and the San Diego Padres. After his playing career, he worked as a manager in the minor leagues and he established baseball fantasy camp for adults. Hundley was inducted into the Chicago Cubs Hall of Fame in 1987.

== Baseball career ==
Hundley was signed by the San Francisco Giants as an amateur free agent in 1960 for the sum of $104,000. While playing for the Double-A El Paso Sun Kings in 1963, he posted a .325 batting average with 23 home runs and 81 runs batted in. Hundley made his major league debut with the Giants on September 27 1964. He returned to the minor leagues in 1965, playing for the Tacoma Giants of the Pacific Coast League although, he was called back to the major leagues briefly in June when regular Giants catcher Tom Haller was injured. In December 1965, he was traded to the Chicago Cubs along with future 20-game winner Bill Hands in exchange for Lindy McDaniel and Don Landrum, as part of first-year manager Leo Durocher's rebuilding effort.

Durocher installed the 24-year-old Hundley as the Cubs' starting catcher and he went on to play in 149 games in 1966, breaking Mickey Cochrane's 41-year-old major league record for most games played by a rookie catcher. He also hit for the cycle on August 11, 1966, in a 9-8, 11 inning victory against the Houston Astros and set a National League record for most home runs by a rookie catcher with 19. Hundley led National League catchers in assists and finished the season ranked fourth in the 1966 National League Rookie of the Year voting.

Hundley continued to shoulder a heavy workload in 1967, playing in 152 games and committing just four errors to set a National League record for fewest errors by a catcher in a season. He led National League catchers in putouts and won the 1967 National League Gold Glove Award for catchers as the Cubs improved from a last place finish in 1966 to finish in third place. Hundley was the first catcher to begin using a new hinged catcher's mitt that permitted a one-handed catching style, protecting his throwing hand. He became a stalwart for the Cubs, setting a major league record in 1968 with 160 games behind the plate (147 complete) as the Cubs again finished the season in third place.

The Cubs began the 1969 season by winning 11 of their first 12 games and held first place from the first day of the season. By late June, Hundley's batting average was above .300 along with 11 home runs earning him a spot as a reserve for the National League team in the 1969 All-Star Game. The entire Chicago Cubs infield joined Hundley on the National League team with third baseman Ron Santo and shortstop Don Kessinger making the team as starting players.

By August 16, the Cubs were nine games ahead of the second place New York Mets and appeared to be on their way to winning the National League Eastern Division title. However, as the season entered its final month, the Cubs would suffer an eight-game losing streak while the Mets countered with a ten-game winning streak. After 155 days in first place, the Cubs dropped to second place as the Mets went on to clinch the division title and eventually won the world championship. Hundley ended the year with a .255 batting average with 18 home runs and 64 runs batted in. He led National League catchers in assists and in games played becoming the first player to catch 150 games for three consecutive years (1967–1969). In his book, The Bill James Historical Baseball Abstract, baseball historian Bill James cited manager Durocher's method of using his regular players every day without any rest days as a factor in the Cubs' 1969 collapse.

Hundley's heavy workload began to take its toll on his body. He missed the first four games of the 1970 season when he suffered a chip fracture in his left thumb during a tag play at home plate. Worse was to come on April 21, 1970 when he suffered a severely sprained left knee during a collision at home plate with the Cardinals' Carl Taylor. The injury forced him to miss three months of the season and he ended the year having appeared in only 73 games.

Hundley once again missed the opening day game of the 1971 season with an ailing knee. He made his first appearance of the season as a pinch hitter in the ninth inning of a game on April 12, 1971 and collapsed after hitting a fly ball to center field. Hundley returned to play on May 11 but, after only eight games, he had to undergo knee surgery and missed the rest of the season.

Hundley returned to play in 114 games for the Cubs in 1972 and led National League catchers with a .995 fielding percentage. However, his damaged knee forced him to favor one side which caused his throws to be off mark. His heavy workload had exacted a price and he was never the same player after his knee injuries.

He was traded from the Cubs to the Twins for George Mitterwald at the Winter Meetings on December 6, 1973. He also played a season with the Padres in 1975 before re-signing with the Cubs on April 13, 1976. In 1977, new Cubs manager Herman Franks named Hundley as his bullpen coach. He was activated late in the season and appeared in two games before retiring at the age of 35.

== Career statistics ==
In a fourteen-year major league career, Hundley played in 1,061 games, accumulating 813 hits in 3,442 at bats for a .236 career batting average along with 82 home runs, 381 runs batted in and a .292 on-base percentage. He ended his career with a .990 fielding percentage.

While Hundley was a relatively light hitter (more so later in his career), he was valued for his defensive skills and for the way he handled the pitching staff. Cubs' relief pitcher Phil Regan said of Hundley in 1972, "He's not only our catcher, he's our leader." He was one of few catchers to steal home, doing so on May 19, 1966 against Gary Kroll of the Houston Astros after tripling off Turk Farrell. Hundley caught two no-hitters in 1972; Burt Hooton on April 16 and Milt Pappas on September 2. He is one of a handful of men to catch two no-hitters in one season.

== Post-retirement ==
Hundley managed in the Cubs minor league system from 1979 to 1981, leading the Midland Cubs to first place in the Western Division of the Texas League in 1979.

After leaving the playing field, Hundley originated the idea of baseball fantasy camps, and since the early 1980s, has operated them to the delight of many a middle aged fan/camper and also to the former pro players who return to the uniform to help coach the teams. For years, Hundley operated camps for many major league teams but now concentrates on the Chicago Cubs. He also occasionally filled in as a commentator on Cubs radio broadcasts. His son Todd Hundley was also a catcher, playing in the major leagues for 15 years. In 2023, together with John St. Augustine, he self-published a memoir entitled Ironman: Legendary Chicago Cubs Catcher Randy Hundley that was reviewed in the Chicago Tribune.

== See also ==
- List of Gold Glove Award winners at catcher
- List of players who have hit for the cycle

Achievements
Preceded by Billy Williams	Hitting for the cycle August 11, 1966	Succeeded by Jim Fregosi
