= Al Montreuil =

American baseball player (1943–2008)

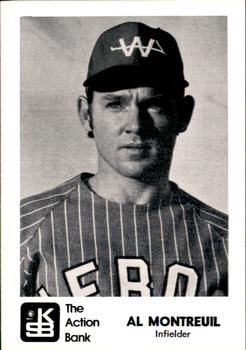
- Second baseman
- Born: August 23, 1943; New Orleans, Louisiana, U.S.
- Died: January 18, 2008 (aged 64); Marrero, Louisiana, U.S.
- Batted: Right Threw: Right

MLB debut
- September 1, 1972, for the Chicago Cubs

Last MLB appearance
- October 3, 1972, for the Chicago Cubs

MLB statistics
- Games played: 5
- At bats: 11
- Hits: 1
- Stats at Baseball Reference

Teams
- Chicago Cubs (1972)

Allan Arthur Montreuil (August 23, 1943 – January 18, 2008) was an American Major League Baseball second baseman who appeared in five games for the 1972 Chicago Cubs. Montreuil was listed as 5 feet 5 inches (1.65 m) tall and 158 pounds (72 kg). He threw and batted right-handed.

A graduate of De La Salle High School in New Orleans, Montreuil attended Loyola University before being signed by the Boston Red Sox in 1964. He was sent to the Cubs in 1969 after spending almost four full years at the Double-A level in the Boston organization.

Montreuil made his Major League debut on September 1, 1972, at Wrigley Field in a 14–3 win against the San Diego Padres. He collected his lone MLB hit in the fourth inning of that game, a single off right-hander Bill Greif. Montreuil started three games at second base for Chicago in the waning weeks of 1972, handling 15 chances without making an error. He played in the Cubs' organization through 1975.

After his retirement from baseball, Montreuil worked as a small business owner and realtor before retiring in 1999. For the last 40 years of his life, he lived in Terrytown, Louisiana. He died on January 18, 2008, and was interred at Westlawn Memorial Park & Mausoleum in Gretna, Louisiana.
