= Jim Baxes =

American baseball player (1928–1996)

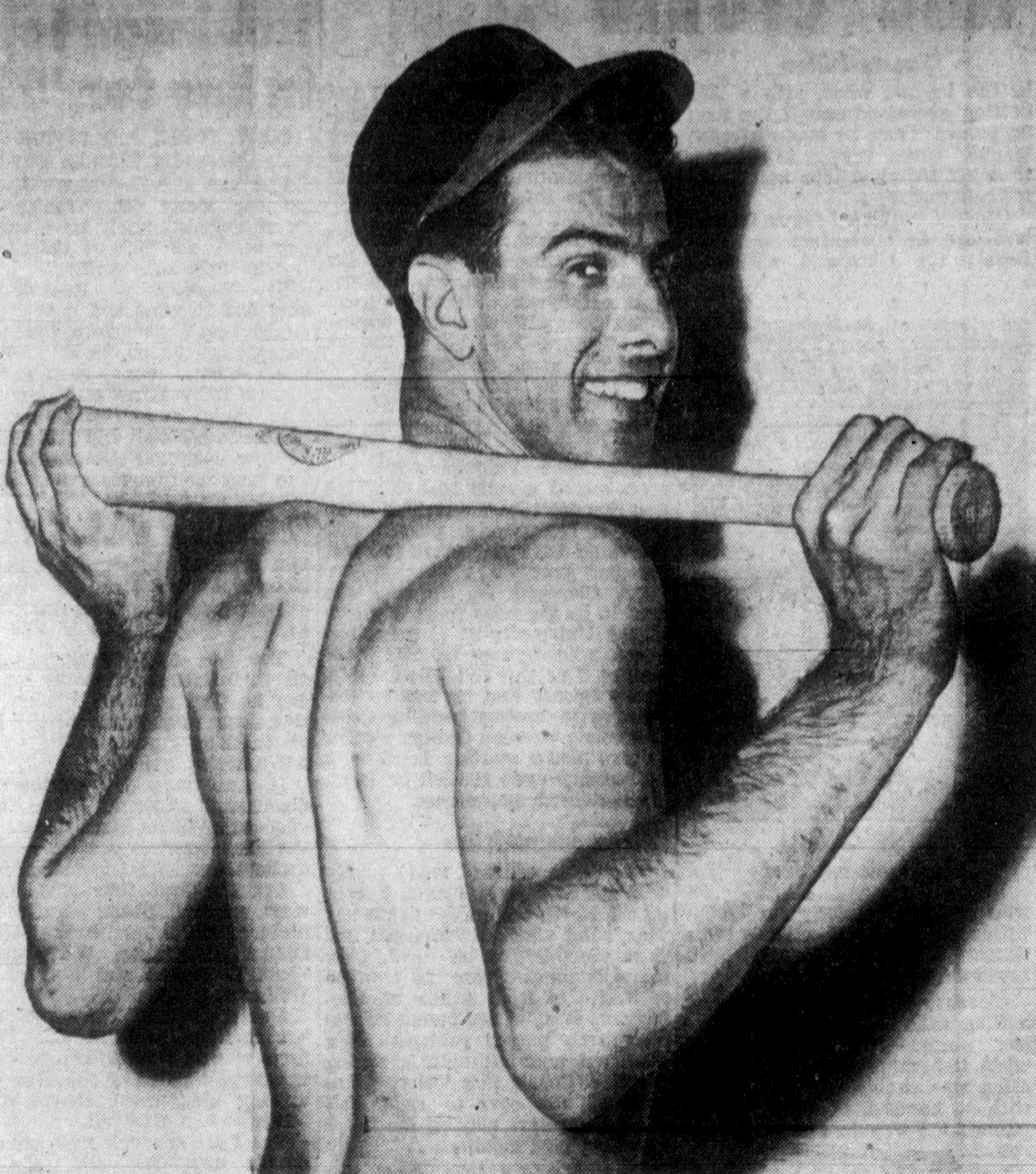
- Baxes, circa 1949
- Third baseman
- Born: July 5, 1928; San Francisco, California, U.S.
- Died: November 14, 1996 (aged 68); Garden Grove, California, U.S.
- Batted: Right Threw: Right

MLB debut
- April 11, 1959, for the Los Angeles Dodgers

Last MLB appearance
- September 26, 1959, for the Cleveland Indians

MLB statistics
- Batting average: .246
- Home runs: 17
- Runs batted in: 39
- Stats at Baseball Reference

Teams
- Los Angeles Dodgers (1959); Cleveland Indians (1959)

Dimitrios Speros "Jim" Baxes (July 5, 1928 – November 14, 1996) was an American Major League Baseball player for the Los Angeles Dodgers and Cleveland Indians for one season.

Baxes was born in San Francisco, California in 1928.

After a long and successful minor league career, Baxes finally made his major league debut April 11, 1959, for the Dodgers. He played in 11 games for Los Angeles, mostly at third base, and hit .303 with a .515 slugging percentage. When the Dodgers removed Baxes from their roster on cut-down day, he considered the idea of quitting baseball. Then, on May 22, Baxes was traded to Cleveland for $10,000 cash and a player.

Baxes played in 77 games for the Indians in 1959 – 48 at second base and 22 at third. He hit .239 for the Tribe and belted 15 home runs. Baxes finished with season and career totals of 17 home runs and a .246 batting average and was selected to the Topps All-Star Rookie Roster. However, it was his only major league season, as he was back in the minor leagues in 1960. After the 1961 campaign, he retired from organized baseball.

On April 15, 1959, he hit his first major league home run off future Hall of Famer Bob Gibson. Gibson had not previously pitched to any batter in the majors. Baxes would collect 16 more that year, while Gibson would surrender just three more in his rookie campaign.

Jim was the older brother of fellow former major leaguer Mike Baxes. Jim and his wife Jeanne Yvonne Baxes (1927–2002) are buried together in Magnolia Memorial Park in Garden Grove, California.
