= Mike Baxes =

American baseball player (1930–2023)

- Shortstop / Second baseman
- Born: December 18, 1930; San Francisco, California, U.S.
- Died: April 13, 2023 (aged 92); Stockton, California, U.S.
- Batted: Right Threw: Right

MLB debut
- April 17, 1956, for the Kansas City Athletics

Last MLB appearance
- September 27, 1958, for the Kansas City Athletics

MLB statistics
- Batting average: .217
- Home runs: 1
- Runs batted in: 13
- Stats at Baseball Reference

Teams
- Kansas City Athletics (1956; 1958)

Michael Baxes (December 18, 1930 – April 13, 2023) was an American professional baseball player. He played two seasons in Major League Baseball, primarily as a second baseman and shortstop, in 1956 and 1958 for the Kansas City Athletics. During his MLB career, he appeared in 146 games, registered 337 at bats, and collected 73 hits. His brother, Jim Baxes, was a major league second baseman and third baseman. Baxes died in San Francisco on April 13, 2023, at the age of 92.
