= Bill Hands =

American baseball player (1940–2017)

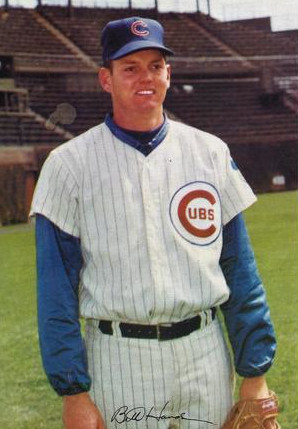
- Hands in 1969
- Pitcher
- Born: May 6, 1940; Hackensack, New Jersey, U.S.
- Died: March 9, 2017 (aged 76); Orlando, Florida, U.S.
- Batted: Right Threw: Right

MLB debut
- June 3, 1965, for the San Francisco Giants

Last MLB appearance
- August 10, 1975, for the Texas Rangers

MLB statistics
- Win–loss record: 111–110
- Earned run average: 3.35
- Strikeouts: 1,128
- Stats at Baseball Reference

Teams
- San Francisco Giants (1965); Chicago Cubs (1966–1972); Minnesota Twins (1973–1974); Texas Rangers (1974–1975)

William Alfred Hands, Jr. (May 6, 1940 – March 9, 2017) was an American professional baseball player who pitched in the major leagues from 1965 to 1975. His best season came in 1969 with the Chicago Cubs, when he won 20 games.

== Early life ==
A native of Rutherford, New Jersey, Bill Hands played baseball at Rutherford High School.

Hands pitched at Fairleigh Dickinson University and Ohio Wesleyan University before signing with the San Francisco Giants. He was later inducted into the Rutherford Hall of Fame.

== Major Leagues ==
Hands, whose nickname was "Froggy," signed as an amateur free agent with the San Francisco Giants in 1959, made his major league debut with them in 1965, pitching in four games that season. After the 1965 season, Hands was traded to the Chicago Cubs with catcher Randy Hundley for outfielder Don Landrum and reliever Lindy McDaniel, a trade regarded at the time as a success for the Giants, and which went on to be viewed as one of the best in Cubs history.

In 1966 with the Chicago Cubs, he started 26 games and relieved 15, going 8-13 with a 4.58 ERA. By 1968, at age 28, he went 16-10 with a 2.89 ERA, followed up in 1969 by his best season, as he went 20-14 with a 2.49 ERA. He threw 18 complete games and pitched 300 innings, while pitching in a rotation along with Hall of Famer Ferguson Jenkins.

The right-hander spent seven seasons with the Cubs, two with the Minnesota Twins and two with the Texas Rangers.

Of Hands, Ferguson Jenkins said, "Hands was an 'even-tempered guy' with a good sinking fastball and sharp slider who did his job and never complained about being underappreciated on a team full of stars."

He finished his career with a record of 111-110 and an ERA of 3.35.

== Personal life ==
During his professional career, he had been a resident of Parsippany-Troy Hills, New Jersey.

After retiring from baseball, Hands was a salesman for an oil company on Long Island. He later opened up a service station, the Orient Service Center, in Orient, New York, where he lived for many years with his wife Sandy; his children (Heather, Billy, and Heidi) and grandchildren also lived in Orient.

Hands died in Florida on March 9, 2017.
