= Chris Ward (baseball) =

American baseball player (born 1949)

- Outfielder
- Born: May 18, 1949 (age 77); Oakland, California, U.S.
- Batted: Left Threw: Left

MLB debut
- September 10, 1972, for the Chicago Cubs

Last MLB appearance
- October 1, 1974, for the Chicago Cubs

MLB statistics
- Batting average: .204
- Home runs: 1
- Runs batted in: 15
- Stats at Baseball Reference

Teams
- Chicago Cubs (1972, 1974)

Chris Gilbert Ward (born May 18, 1949) is a former Major League Baseball player. Ward played for the Chicago Cubs in 1972 and 1974. He batted and threw left-handed.

He was drafted by the Cubs in the 3rd round of the 1968 amateur draft.
