= Rick Bladt =

American baseball player (born 1946)

- Outfielder
- Born: December 9, 1946 (age 79); Santa Cruz, California, U.S.
- Batted: Left Threw: Right

MLB debut
- June 15, 1969, for the Chicago Cubs

Last MLB appearance
- September 28, 1975, for the New York Yankees

MLB statistics
- Batting average: .215
- Home runs: 1
- Runs batted in: 12
- Stats at Baseball Reference

Teams
- Chicago Cubs (1969); New York Yankees (1975)

Richard Alan Bladt (born December 9, 1946) is an American former professional baseball player and an outfielder who appeared in 62 career games in Major League Baseball for the 1969 Chicago Cubs and 1975 New York Yankees. Born in Santa Cruz, California, he batted left-handed, threw right-handed and was listed as 6 feet 1 inch (1.85 m) tall and 160 pounds (73 kg). He attended Foothill College.

Bladt was signed by the Cubs in 1966 as an undrafted amateur free agent. He worked his way through the Cubs' minor league system and made his debut with the big league club on June 15, 1969 in the first game of a doubleheader against the Cincinnati Reds, pinch-running for Hall of Famer Billy Williams. He started the second game of the doubleheader, and after lining into a double play in his first at-bat, he singled in a run off Gerry Arrigo for his first major league hit. Williams then replaced Bladt as a pinch-hitter in the sixth inning. Bladt would appear in eight more games in June before being sent back to the minors.

Bladt was the player to be named later that completed a trade between the Cubs and Yankees in January 1970. The Cubs sent a minor leaguer and cash, along with a player to be named later, in exchange for Jimmie Hall on September 11, 1969. The transfer of Bladt completed the deal. Bladt languished in the New York minor league system until resurfacing in the majors in 1975. He made his Yankee debut on July 19 and remained with the team through the end of the season. Bladt hit his first (and only) major league home run on August 23, 1975 off Andy Hassler of the California Angels, and he spent September as the Yankees' everyday center fielder, replacing Elliott Maddox. After another year in the minors, however, the Yankees traded Bladt along with Maddox to the Baltimore Orioles for Paul Blair on January 20, 1977. Bladt never returned to the major leagues.

Bladt's 62 MLB games played included 37 starts as an outfielder, batting .215 with 12 runs batted in. His 28 career hits included three doubles and a triple, in addition to his home run.

== Sources ==
- Career statistics from MLB · ESPN · Baseball Reference · Fangraphs · Baseball Reference (Minors) · Retrosheet · Baseball Almanac
