= Rich Nye =

American baseball player (born 1944)

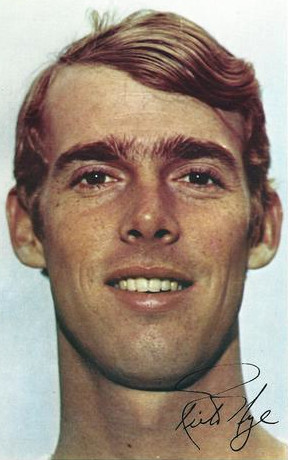
- Nye in 1969
- Pitcher
- Born: August 4, 1944 (age 82); Oakland, California, U.S.
- Batted: Left Threw: Left

MLB debut
- September 16, 1966, for the Chicago Cubs

Last MLB appearance
- September 2, 1970, for the Montreal Expos

MLB statistics
- Win–loss record: 26–31
- Earned run average: 3.71
- Strikeouts: 267
- Stats at Baseball Reference

Teams
- Chicago Cubs (1966–1969); St. Louis Cardinals (1970); Montreal Expos (1970)

Richard Raymond Nye (born August 4, 1944) is an American former professional baseball player who was a left-handed pitcher in the Major Leagues from 1966–1970.

Nye was drafted by the Cubs in 1966 while still at the University of California, Berkeley. Nye went to their Class A team in Caldwell, Idaho for a brief "spring training" and 3 weeks of action before being called up to the California Class A league to finish that minor league season; Chicago brought him to the majors in 1966 at the end of the season. Nye received a degree in civil engineering from the University of California at Berkeley in the same year he was drafted. He played for the St. Louis Cardinals, Montreal Expos, and Chicago Cubs.

Nye was with the Cubs during the years Leo Durocher was manager and recalled learning when he was scheduled to pitch not from Durocher, but by reading the sports column. He was named Chicago's Rookie of the Year in 1968.

Nye played in the major leagues for over five years; his baseball career came to an end due to injuries.

Upon retiring, Rich initially used his civil engineering degree, working for a time on what was to become the Willis Tower and became a commodities trader at the Chicago Mercantile Exchange.

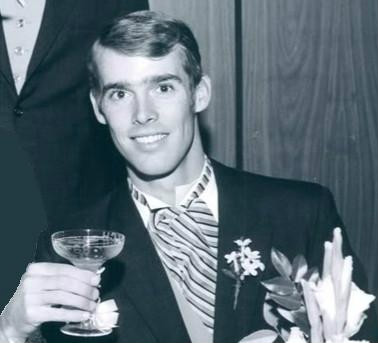
Rich Nye in 1968

A teammate of his with the 1971 Winnipeg Whips, Triple A affiliate of the Montreal Expos, was the father of major leaguer John Olerud, who was in medical school while playing baseball. Looking for something that would be as inspirational to him as baseball was, the two discussed the possibilities and Nye learned he needed some undergraduate science credits to be a candidate for the University of Illinois' veterinary program. He entered the University of Illinois School of Veterinary Medicine in 1972, becoming a veterinarian in 1976. He began practicing medicine at Niles Animal Hospital in Niles, Illinois. Nye developed a special interest in birds while at the practice and became an exotic and avian specialist. When the Association of Avian Veterinarians was founded in 1980, he became a charter member and is also a past president of AAV (1989).

Using his abilities in commodity trading to earn the money for starting his own practice, Nye and two other exotic animal veterinarians founded Midwest Bird and Exotic Animal Hospital in Westchester, Illinois in 1985, which was the first exotic-only specialist practice in the United States.

Nye and Dr. Susan Brown, a partner and the inspiration for starting the all-exotic practice, were married. Their practice grew to include five veterinarians and a large support staff; almost 20 years after the founding of the hospital, the couple sold it to two veterinarians on their staff in October 2004. The practice that Nye and Brown started outgrew its original home in Westchester; in 2005, it moved to its present location in Elmwood Park, Illinois.

He is the author of several veterinary textbook chapters on avian medicine, serves as a consultant, and had continued to see patients at Ness Exotic Wellness Center in Lisle, Illinois on a part-time basis until his retirement in 2024.
