= Carmen Fanzone =

American baseball player (born 1941)

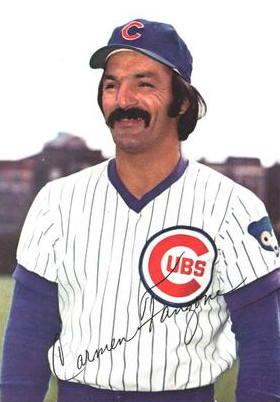
- Fanzone in 1973
- Third baseman
- Born: August 30, 1941 (age 84); Detroit, Michigan, U.S.
- Batted: Right Threw: Right

MLB debut
- July 21, 1970, for the Boston Red Sox

Last MLB appearance
- October 2, 1974, for the Chicago Cubs

MLB statistics
- Batting average: .224
- Home runs: 20
- Runs batted in: 94
- Stats at Baseball Reference

Teams
- Boston Red Sox (1970); Chicago Cubs (1971–1974)

Carmen Ronald Fanzone (born August 30, 1941) is an American former utility man who played between 1970 and 1974 in Major League Baseball. Listed at 6 ft 0 in (1.83 m), 200 pounds (91 kg), he batted and threw right-handed. Fanzone was a versatile and effective utility man who was able to play all four infield positions, left field and right field, playing mainly as a third baseman.

Fanzone was signed as an amateur free agent by the Boston Red Sox in 1964, spending seven years at different minor league levels before joining the big team in 1970. As a rookie, he hit .200 (3-for-15) in 10 games. Then, he was dealt by Boston to the Chicago Cubs before the 1971 season in the transaction that brought Phil Gagliano to the Red Sox. His most productive season came with the 1972 Cubs, when he posted career-numbers in games (86), home runs (8), runs batted in (42) and runs (26). He wore number 23, now retired in honor of Ryne Sandberg. Fanzone is known for catching the last out in Milt Pappas's no-hitter on September 2, 1972, when Gary Jestadt of the Padres popped out to him. He appeared in 227 games with Chicago, mostly in pinch-hit duties, and did not return to the majors after the 1974 season. He also is one of three players in Cubs history to hit home runs in consecutive pinch-hit at bats. The others are Dale Long and Darrin Jackson.

In a five-season career covering 237 games, Fanzone was a .224 hitter (132 hits in 588 at bats) with 20 home runs and 94 runs batted in, 27 doubles and three stolen bases. After that, he played with the Hawaii Islanders 1975 Pacific Coast League champion team.

Fanzone is an accomplished horn player. On June 18, 1972, he played "The Star-Spangled Banner" prior to a game at Wrigley Field. Following his playing retirement, Fanzone started a jazz music career as a flugelhorn player. Fanzone and his wife Sue Raney, a four-time Grammy Award nominee as a jazz vocalist, reside in Sherman Oaks.

In the television series Transformers Animated, the captain of the Detroit Police Department was named Carmine Fanzone as a tribute by series writer and neighbor to Fanzone, Marty Isenberg. Though due to the scarcity of the name in Michigan, Fanzone signed a waiver during production allowing the use.

Fanzone is a professional trumpeter and is married to vocalist Sue Raney.
