= Don Landrum =

American baseball player (1936–2003)

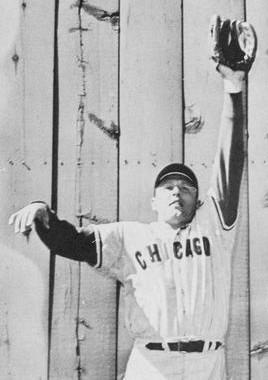
- Center fielder
- Born: February 16, 1936; Santa Rosa, California, U.S.
- Died: January 9, 2003 (aged 66); Pittsburg, California, U.S.
- Batted: Left Threw: Right

MLB debut
- September 28, 1957, for the Philadelphia Phillies

Last MLB appearance
- July 21, 1966, for the San Francisco Giants

MLB statistics
- Batting average: .234
- Home runs: 12
- Runs batted in: 75
- Stats at Baseball Reference

Teams
- Philadelphia Phillies (1957); St. Louis Cardinals (1960–1962); Chicago Cubs (1962–1965); San Francisco Giants (1966)

Donald Leroy Landrum (February 16, 1936 – January 9, 2003) was an American professional baseball outfielder, who played in Major League Baseball (MLB) for the Philadelphia Phillies, St. Louis Cardinals, Chicago Cubs, and San Francisco Giants, from 1957 to 1966. During his playing days, he stood 6 feet (1.8 m) tall, weighing 180 pounds (82 kg), while batting left-handed and throwing right-handed.

== Early life ==
Landrum was born on February 16, 1936, in Santa Rosa, California. He attended Mount Diablo High School in Concord, California.

== Baseball career ==
=== Philadelphia Phillies ===
Originally signed by the Philadelphia Phillies as an amateur free agent in 1954, Landrum made his major league debut with the Phils on September 28, 1957, against the Brooklyn Dodgers. He played in just two games for the Quakers, appearing in both games as the team’s starting center fielder at Philadelphia’s Connie Mack Stadium.

=== St. Louis Cardinals ===
From 1960 to mid-way through the 1962 season, Landrum played for the St. Louis Cardinals, during which times he appeared in only 73 games, with a batting average of .227. On June 5, 1962, Landrum was traded to the Chicago Cubs.

=== Chicago Cubs ===
Landrum may be best-remembered for his time with the Cubs. He was Chicago's regular center fielder in 1965, appearing in 131 games and garnering 425 at bats. But he batted a meager .226 with six home runs and 34 runs batted in (RBI).

=== San Francisco Giants ===
Landrum was traded to his hometown San Francisco Giants at year's end, along with pitcher Lindy McDaniel for pitcher Bill Hands and catcher Randy Hundley. While Hands and Hundley would become key members of the Cubs' contending teams under manager Leo Durocher in the late 1960s, Landrum's professional career ended after the 1966 season.

For his career, Landrum appeared in 456 MLB games, with 1,160 at-bats and 272 hits for a .234 lifetime batting mark.

== After baseball ==
In retirement, Landrum worked in various businesses in East Contra Costa County. He was an avid San Francisco Giants and 49ers fan. Landrum enjoyed playing Pinochle and collecting baseball cards. More than anything, he enjoyed spending time with his family and grandchildren.

== Death ==
On January 9, 2003, Landrum died at his Pittsburg, California home, at the age of 66.
