= Miami Stadium =

Baseball stadium in Miami, Florida

- Interactive map of Miami Stadium
- Full name: Bobby Maduro Miami Stadium (1987–2001)
- Location: 2301 Northwest 10th Avenue, Miami, Florida 33127
- Coordinates: 25.79907°N 80.210978°W
- Owner: José Manuel Alemán (1949–50); José Braulio Alemán (1950–58); City of Miami (1958–99); St. Martin Affordable Housing Inc. (1999–2001)
- Capacity: 13,000
- Surface: Grass
- Field size: Left – 330 ft. Center – 400 ft. Right – 330 ft.

Construction
- Opened: August 31, 1949
- Demolished: 2001
- Cost: US$2.2 million

Tenants
- Miami Sun Sox (FIL) (1949–54); Brooklyn / Los Angeles Dodgers (NL) (spring training) (1950–58); Miami Marlins (IL) (1956–60); Baltimore Orioles (AL) (spring training) (1959–1990); Miami Marlins/Orioles (FSL) (1962–88); Miami Amigos (IAL) (1979); Gold Coast Suns (SPBA) (1989/1990); Miami Dade Community College Wolfson Campus (1970-1996)

Miami Stadium, later officially known as Bobby Maduro Miami Stadium, was a baseball stadium in Miami, Florida. It was primarily used as the home field of the Miami Marlins minor league baseball team, as well as other minor league teams. It opened in 1949 and held 13,500 people.

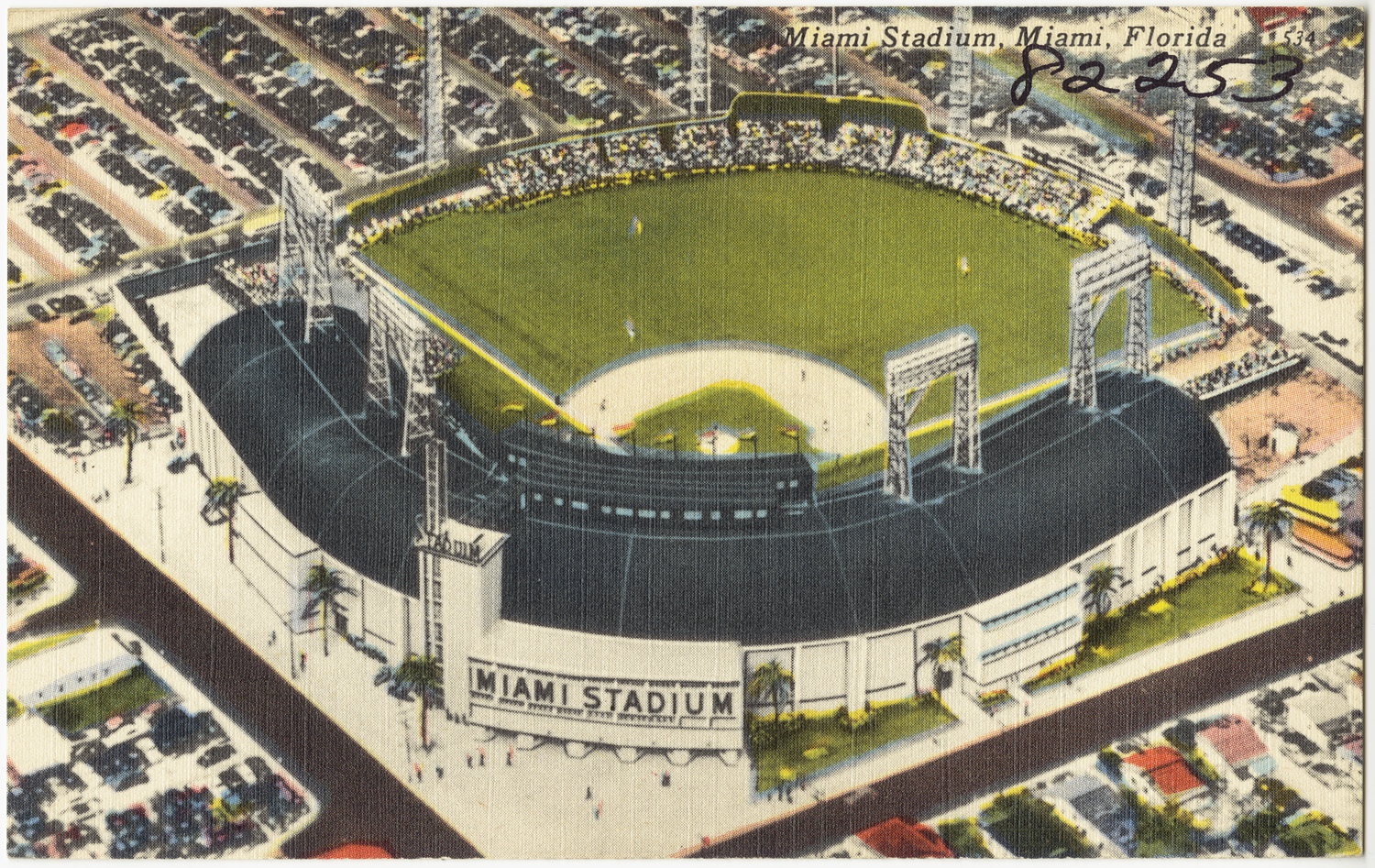
View of the stadium in the 1950s

The stadium was located on the block bounded by Northwest 23rd Street (south – first base), Northwest 10th Avenue (west – third base), and Northwest 8th Avenue (east – right field), with an open area behind left field extending about a block north. A distinguishing feature of the ballpark was a high arched cantilever-type roof over the grandstand, in contrast to the typical styles of either flat and slightly sloping, or peaked like a house. This design enabled the ballpark to have a roof that covered most of the seating area without any posts blocking the spectators' view. Al López Field in Tampa employed a somewhat similar design with a less dramatic curve and less coverage.

It was the spring training home of the Brooklyn / Los Angeles Dodgers from 1950 to 1958 (for most of their "A" games). The Dodgers played their first game as the Los Angeles Dodgers at the ballpark when they opened their 1958 spring training schedule against the Phillies on March 8, 1958, in front of 5,966 fans. It was used during the spring by the Baltimore Orioles from 1959 to 1990. At the time of its construction, Miami Stadium was remarkably modern and well-appointed, although in time it would be surpassed by later designs.

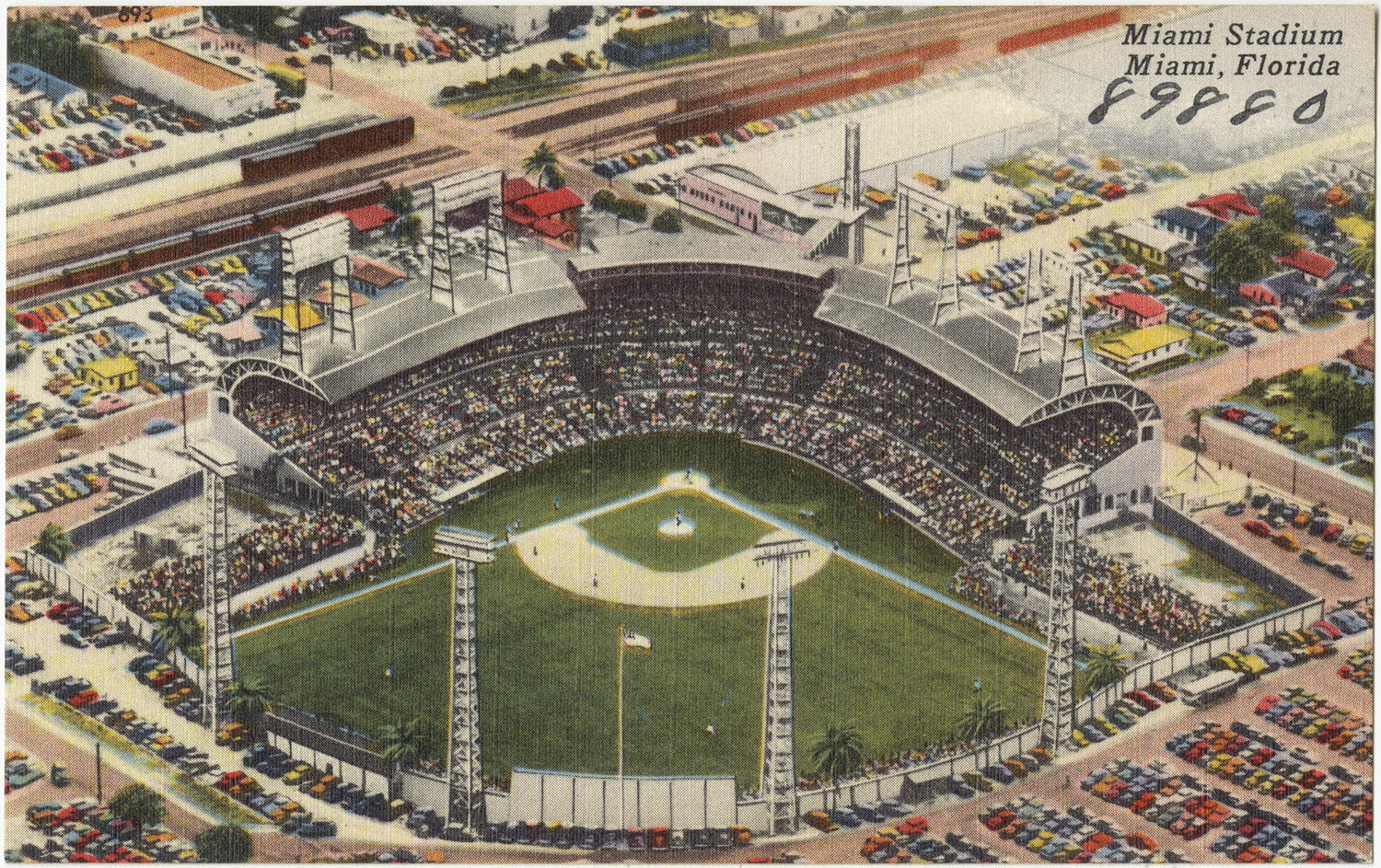
Inside view of stadium in 1950s

On June 6, 1958, Orioles president James Keelty Jr. reached agreement with Miami Marlins president George B. Storer to move the Orioles spring training home from Scottsdale, Arizona to Miami Stadium for the 1959 spring training season. On May 25, 1990, the Orioles announced that the team would move their spring training home games from Miami Stadium to Bradenton and Sarasota in 1991. The Orioles had trained at Twin Lakes Park in Sarasota prior to spring games in 1989 and 1990.

The Miami City Commission voted unanimously in favor of the renaming in February 1987, and the ceremony took place the following month. The ballpark became known officially as Bobby Maduro Miami Stadium in honor to the famous Cuban baseball entrepreneur Bobby Maduro. Said Maduro's widow Marta to herself, "Gordo (fat one), they finally know who you are."

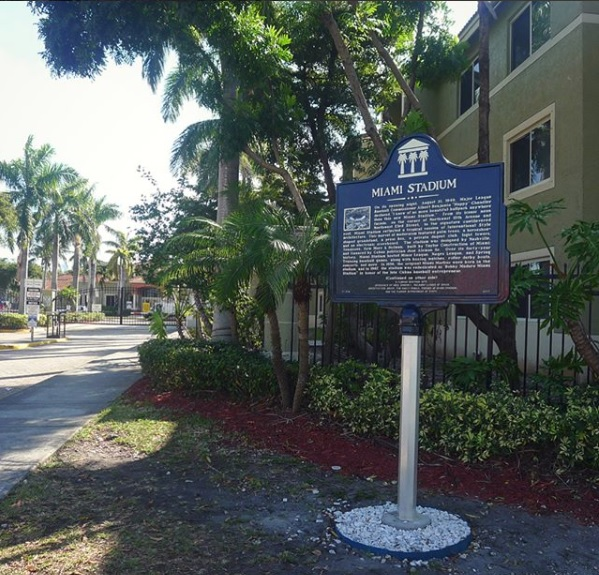
Historic marker placed at site of Miami Stadium on December 16, 2017, at the current Miami Stadium Apartments in Miami's Allapattah neighborhood

The City of Miami had proposed razing the stadium and selling the property for warehouses. But a sale price of $1.6 million plus demolition cost of $725,000, scared away would-be developers. The City rezoned the property in 1998 for housing. St. Martin Affordable Housing Inc. purchased the 12.6-acre (51,000 m^{2}) property from the City of Miami for $2.1 million in 1999 to raze the stadium and build a rental housing project. A large apartment complex (called The Miami Stadium Apartments) now stands where the stadium was.

Estadio Quisqueya, in Santo Domingo, Dominican Republic (inaugurated in 1955), is an almost exact replica of the stadium.

A PBS documentary, White Elephant: What Is There To Save?, was produced in 2007 about the stadium's history.

In 2017, Abel Sanchez, a Miami native, created a GoFundMe page which raised $2,500 to get a historical marker for the site. The Florida Department of State's State Historical Marker Council reviewed and ultimately approved the application.
