= Miami Marlins (International League) =

- 1956–1960; Miami, Florida

Minor league affiliations
- Previous classes: Triple-A
- League: International League

Major league affiliations
- Previous teams: Philadelphia Phillies (1956–1958); Baltimore Orioles (1959–1960)

Team data
- Previous parks: Miami Stadium

The Miami Marlins were a minor league baseball team based in Miami, Florida. The original Marlins were a Triple-A franchise in the International League from 1956 through 1960. The International League team was succeeded by a Single-A team in the Florida State League (now the Fort Myers Mighty Mussels) and today's Miami Marlins (formerly the Florida Marlins) of Major League Baseball.

== History ==
The International League Marlins were a transplanted version of the original Syracuse Chiefs, having been created on December 20, 1955, when the Syracuse club (a member of the IL as early as 1886 and a continuous member since 1934) was sold to Sidney Salomon (future founding owner of the St. Louis Blues of the National Hockey League) and Elliot Stein.

The 1955 Chiefs, an affiliate of the Philadelphia Phillies, finished only two games out of the playoffs, but drew only 85,000 fans, last in the eight-team league. In the Marlins' debut season in Miami, the club finished third and attracted 288,000 spectators, second in the IL circuit. Attendance dwindled in the following years, however, and by 1960 the Marlins—by then a Baltimore Orioles affiliate—were at the bottom of the IL, with fewer than 110,000 paying fans. The franchise signed a working agreement with the St. Louis Cardinals and moved to San Juan, Puerto Rico, in 1961, although after little more than a month of play the Marlins moved again to Charleston, West Virginia, on May 19.

In 1962, the franchise moved to Atlanta, discarding the Marlins name and adopting the Atlanta Crackers name, a team in the recently disbanded Class AA Southern Association.

In 1966, when the Milwaukee Braves moved to Atlanta, the franchise relocated again to Richmond, Virginia, where it played as the Richmond Braves for 43 seasons, through 2008.

The franchise then moved to Gwinnett County, Georgia in 2009, and was known as the Gwinnett Braves through the 2017 season when the franchise became the Gwinnett Stripers in 2018.

== Notable players ==
Notable Marlins during the 1956–60 period were veterans like Leroy "Satchel" Paige, the great former Negro leagues pitcher then in his 50s, three-time league all-star infielder Forrest "Woody" Smith, ex-New York Giants starting pitcher Rubén Gómez, two-time MLB All Star Sid Gordon, 1959 IL earned run average champ Artie Kay, former Brooklyn outfielder Cal Abrams, and fireballer Virgil Trucks.

Their younger players included future big-leaguers like infielder Jerry Adair, outfielders Whitey Herzog and Dave Nicholson, and pitchers Rudy Árias, Don Cardwell, Turk Farrell, Jack Fisher and Dallas Green.

Although its home park was Miami Stadium, on August 7, 1956, the largest crowd in minor league history at the time (57,713) came to see Miami's 50-year-old Paige beat Columbus at the Orange Bowl. That record would stand until it was broken on July 4, 1982, when the Triple-A Denver Bears hosted the Omaha Royals at Mile High Stadium, drawing an announced crowd of 65,666 fans. This remains the all-time single-game attendance record in Minor League Baseball history.

== Yearly record ==
Year	Record	Finish Full Season	Attendance	Manager	Postseason
1956	80–71	3rd	288,582	Don Osborn	Lost to Rochester in first round
1957	75–78	4th	181,651	Don Osborn	Lost to Buffalo in finals
1958	75–78	5th	161,042	Kerby Farrell	DNQ
1959	71–83	7th	140,384	Pepper Martin	DNQ
1960	65–88	7th	109,899	Al Vincent	DNQ

== Legacy ==
In February 2008, it was announced that the big league Florida Marlins franchise would change its name to the Miami Marlins in 2012, upon moving into its new stadium, Marlins Park (now loanDepot Park) at the former site of the Orange Bowl.

In June 2013, a book titled: "The Forgotten Marlins: A Tribute to the 1956–1960 Original Miami Marlins" was published by Rowman & Littlefield written by author Sam Zygner.

In June 2019 a book titled: "Baseball Under the Palms History of Miami Minor League Baseball: The Early Years 1892-1960 (Volume I) was published by Sunbury Press written by authors Sam Zygner and Barbra Cabrera.

In May 2022 Volume II: "Baseball Under the Palms; 1962-1991, The Later Years; The History of Miami Minor League Baseball" was released published by Sunbury Press written by authors: Sam Zygner and Barbra Cabrera.

== Affiliations ==
The IL Miami Marlins were affiliated with the following major league teams:

Year	Affiliation(s)
1956–1958	Philadelphia Phillies
1959–1960	Baltimore Orioles

== See also ==
- Fort Myers Miracle
