= 1969 in baseball =

The following are the baseball events of the year 1969 throughout the world.

== Expansion ==
Four expansion teams joined Major League Baseball for this season: the San Diego Padres, the Kansas City Royals, the Seattle Pilots, and the first MLB team in Canada, the Montreal Expos. To accommodate the additional teams, the two leagues were split into two divisions of East and West. For the first time, extra post-season playoff series were added prior to the World Series, at this juncture best-of-five series between the East and West division leaders in each league.

== Champions ==
=== Major League Baseball ===
The most notable part of the 1969 season were the Miracle Mets

- World Series: New York Mets over Baltimore Orioles (4–1); Donn Clendenon, MVP

League Championship Series (ALCS, NLCS)
East | Baltimore | 3
West | Minnesota | 0
East | NY Mets | 3
West | Atlanta | 0

World Series
AL | Baltimore | 1
NL | NY Mets | 4

- All-Star Game, July 23 at Robert F. Kennedy Memorial Stadium: National League, 9–3; Willie McCovey, MVP

=== Other champions ===
- College World Series: Arizona State
- Japan Series: Yomiuri Giants over Hankyu Braves (4–2)
- Big League World Series: Mojave Desert LL, Barstow, California
- Little League World Series: Taipei, Taiwan
- Senior League World Series: Sacramento, California

== Awards and honors ==
- Baseball Hall of Fame
  - Roy Campanella
  - Stan Coveleski
  - Waite Hoyt
  - Stan Musial

Baseball Writers' Association of America Awards
| BBWAA Award | National League | American League |
|---|---|---|
| Rookie of the Year | Ted Sizemore (LAD) | Lou Piniella (KC) |
| Cy Young Award | Tom Seaver (NYM) | Mike Cuellar (BAL); Denny McLain (DET) |
| Most Valuable Player | Willie McCovey (SF) | Harmon Killebrew (MIN) |
Gold Glove Awards
| Position | National League | American League |
| Pitcher | Bob Gibson (STL) | Jim Kaat (MIN) |
| Catcher | Johnny Bench (CIN) | Bill Freehan (DET) |
| 1st Base | Wes Parker (LAD) | Joe Pepitone (NYY) |
| 2nd Base | Félix Millán (ATL) | Davey Johnson (BAL) |
| 3rd Base | Clete Boyer (ATL) | Brooks Robinson (BAL) |
| Shortstop | Don Kessinger (CHC) | Mark Belanger (BAL) |
| Outfield | Roberto Clemente (PIT) | Paul Blair (BAL) |
| Outfield | Curt Flood (STL) | Mickey Stanley (DET) |
| Outfield | Pete Rose (CIN) | Carl Yastrzemski (BOS) |

== Statistical leaders ==
| | American League | | National League | |
| Stat | Player | Total | Player | Total |
|---|---|---|---|---|
| AVG | Rod Carew (MIN) | .332 | Pete Rose (CIN) | .348 |
| HR | Harmon Killebrew (MIN) | 49 | Willie McCovey (SF) | 45 |
| RBI | Harmon Killebrew (MIN) | 140 | Willie McCovey (SF) | 126 |
| W | Denny McLain (DET) | 24 | Tom Seaver (NYM) | 25 |
| ERA | Dick Bosman (WAS) | 2.19 | Juan Marichal (SF) | 2.10 |
| K | Sam McDowell (CLE) | 279 | Ferguson Jenkins (CHC) | 273 |

The save is introduced as an official statistic this year. Ron Perranoski lead the majors with 31.

== Major league baseball final standings ==
=== American League final standings ===
AL East
| Team | W | L | Pct. | GB | Home | Road |
|---|---|---|---|---|---|---|
| ^{(1)} Baltimore Orioles | 109 | 53 | .673 | — | 60‍–‍21 | 49‍–‍32 |
| Detroit Tigers | 90 | 72 | .556 | 19 | 46‍–‍35 | 44‍–‍37 |
| Boston Red Sox | 87 | 75 | .537 | 22 | 46‍–‍35 | 41‍–‍40 |
| Washington Senators | 86 | 76 | .531 | 23 | 47‍–‍34 | 39‍–‍42 |
| New York Yankees | 80 | 81 | .497 | 28½ | 48‍–‍32 | 32‍–‍49 |
| Cleveland Indians | 62 | 99 | .385 | 46½ | 33‍–‍48 | 29‍–‍51 |

AL West
| Team | W | L | Pct. | GB | Home | Road |
|---|---|---|---|---|---|---|
| ^{(2)} Minnesota Twins | 97 | 65 | .599 | — | 57‍–‍24 | 40‍–‍41 |
| Oakland Athletics | 88 | 74 | .543 | 9 | 49‍–‍32 | 39‍–‍42 |
| California Angels | 71 | 91 | .438 | 26 | 43‍–‍38 | 28‍–‍53 |
| Kansas City Royals | 69 | 93 | .426 | 28 | 36‍–‍45 | 33‍–‍48 |
| Chicago White Sox | 68 | 94 | .420 | 29 | 41‍–‍40 | 27‍–‍54 |
| Seattle Pilots | 64 | 98 | .395 | 33 | 34‍–‍47 | 30‍–‍51 |

Locations of teams for the 1969 American League season
West East

=== National League final standings ===
NL East
| Team | W | L | Pct. | GB | Home | Road |
|---|---|---|---|---|---|---|
| ^{(1)} New York Mets | 100 | 62 | .617 | — | 52‍–‍30 | 48‍–‍32 |
| Chicago Cubs | 92 | 70 | .568 | 8 | 49‍–‍32 | 43‍–‍38 |
| Pittsburgh Pirates | 88 | 74 | .543 | 12 | 47‍–‍34 | 41‍–‍40 |
| St. Louis Cardinals | 87 | 75 | .537 | 13 | 42‍–‍38 | 45‍–‍37 |
| Philadelphia Phillies | 63 | 99 | .389 | 37 | 30‍–‍51 | 33‍–‍48 |
| Montreal Expos | 52 | 110 | .321 | 48 | 24‍–‍57 | 28‍–‍53 |

NL West
| Team | W | L | Pct. | GB | Home | Road |
|---|---|---|---|---|---|---|
| ^{(2)} Atlanta Braves | 93 | 69 | .574 | — | 50‍–‍31 | 43‍–‍38 |
| San Francisco Giants | 90 | 72 | .556 | 3 | 52‍–‍29 | 38‍–‍43 |
| Cincinnati Reds | 89 | 73 | .549 | 4 | 50‍–‍31 | 39‍–‍42 |
| Los Angeles Dodgers | 85 | 77 | .525 | 8 | 50‍–‍31 | 35‍–‍46 |
| Houston Astros | 81 | 81 | .500 | 12 | 52‍–‍29 | 29‍–‍52 |
| San Diego Padres | 52 | 110 | .321 | 41 | 28‍–‍53 | 24‍–‍57 |

Locations of teams for the 1969 National League season
West East

== Nippon Professional Baseball final standings ==
=== Central League final standings ===
| Central League | G | W | L | T | Pct. | GB |
|---|---|---|---|---|---|---|
| Yomiuri Giants | 130 | 73 | 51 | 6 | .589 | — |
| Hanshin Tigers | 130 | 68 | 59 | 3 | .535 | 6.5 |
| Taiyo Whales | 130 | 61 | 61 | 8 | .500 | 11.0 |
| Chunichi Dragons | 130 | 59 | 65 | 6 | .476 | 14.0 |
| Sankei Atoms | 130 | 58 | 69 | 3 | .457 | 16.5 |
| Hiroshima Toyo Carp | 130 | 56 | 70 | 4 | .444 | 18.0 |

=== Pacific League final standings ===
| Pacific League | G | W | L | T | Pct. | GB |
|---|---|---|---|---|---|---|
| Hankyu Braves | 130 | 76 | 50 | 4 | .603 | — |
| Kintetsu Buffaloes | 130 | 73 | 51 | 6 | .589 | 2.0 |
| Lotte Orions | 130 | 69 | 54 | 7 | .561 | 5.5 |
| Toei Flyers | 130 | 57 | 70 | 3 | .449 | 19.5 |
| Nishitetsu Lions | 130 | 51 | 75 | 4 | .405 | 25.0 |
| Nankai Hawks | 130 | 50 | 76 | 4 | .397 | 26.0 |

== Events ==
=== January ===
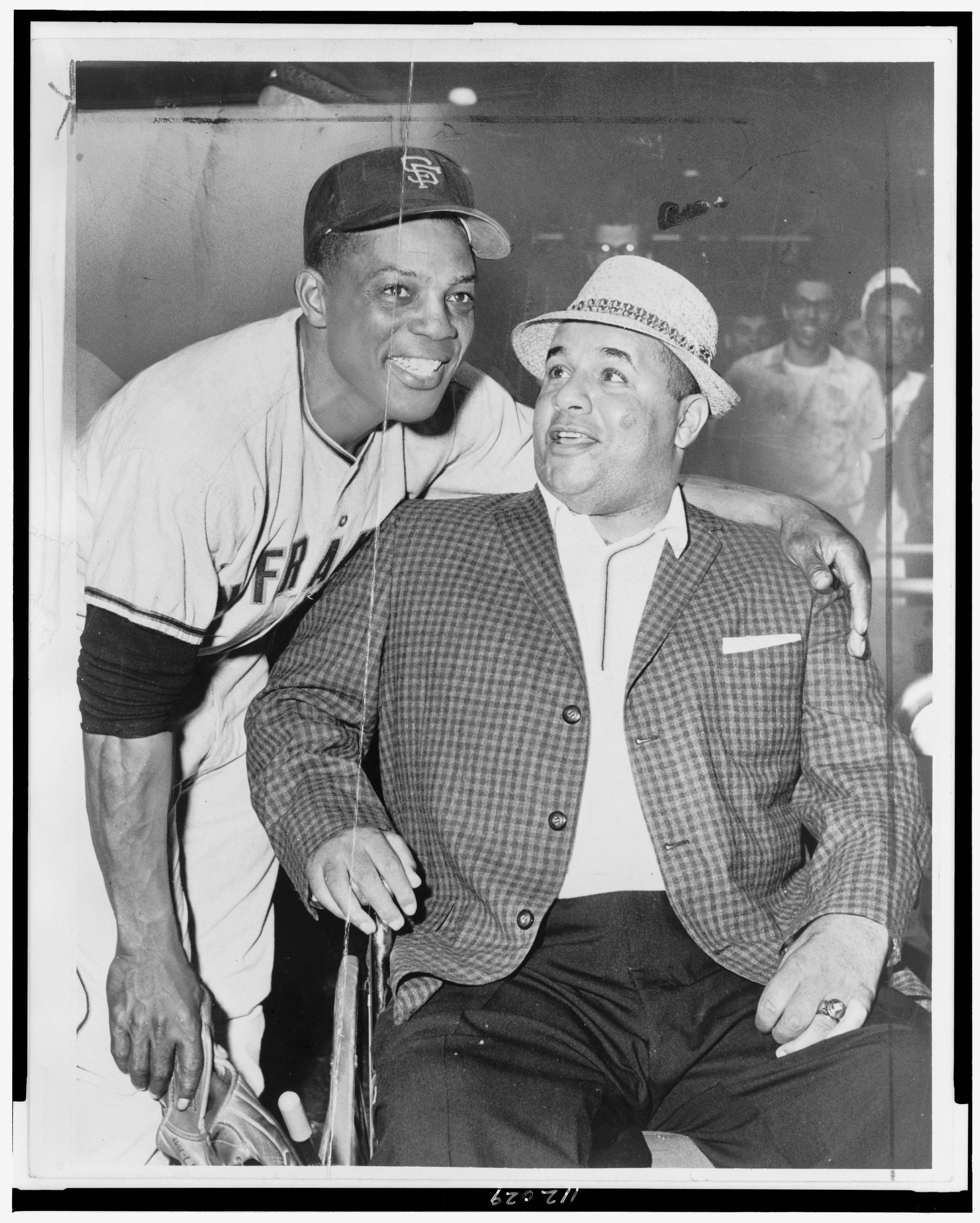
Roy Campanella (right) and Willie Mays

- January 2 – In response to major-league owners' continued refusal to increase their contributions to the players' pension fund commensurately with their television broadcast revenues, the Major League Baseball Players Association urges players not to sign any new contracts.
- January 9 – The Chicago Cubs reacquire relief pitcher Ted Abernathy, two-time National League saves leader, sending catcher Bill Plummer, outfielder/first baseman Clarence Jones and minor-league pitcher Kenneth Myette to the Cincinnati Reds for the 35-year-old "submariner".
- January 20
  - The Philadelphia Phillies trade former starting catcher Clay Dalrymple to the Baltimore Orioles for outfielder Ron Stone. Veteran Dalrymple will back up Elrod Hendricks and Andy Etchebarren on three straight American League pennant-winners and one World Series champion.
  - The California Angels trade pitcher Sammy Ellis to the Chicago White Sox for outfielder Bill Voss.
- January 21 – Stan Musial (93.2%, 317 ballots), in his first year of eligibility, and Roy Campanella (79.4%, 270 ballots) are voted into the Hall of Fame by BBWAA members.
- January 22 – The Montreal Expos trade first baseman Donn Clendenon and outfielder Jesús Alou to the Houston Astros for outfielder Rusty Staub. But Clendenon refuses to report because he strongly dislikes Astro manager Harry Walker, who had been his skipper with the Pittsburgh Pirates between 1965 and July 1967. On April 8, the Expos will send pitchers Jack Billingham and Skip Guinn and $100,000 to Houston to replace Clendenon in the trade.
- January 29 – On his first official day as owner of the Washington Senators, Bob Short fires former slugging outfielder Jim Lemon as the club's manager. Washington finished last in the American League with a 65–96 record in 1968, Lemon's only season as pilot. In the coming weeks, Short also will dismiss general manager (GM) George Selkirk and assume Selkirk's former duties himself.

=== February ===
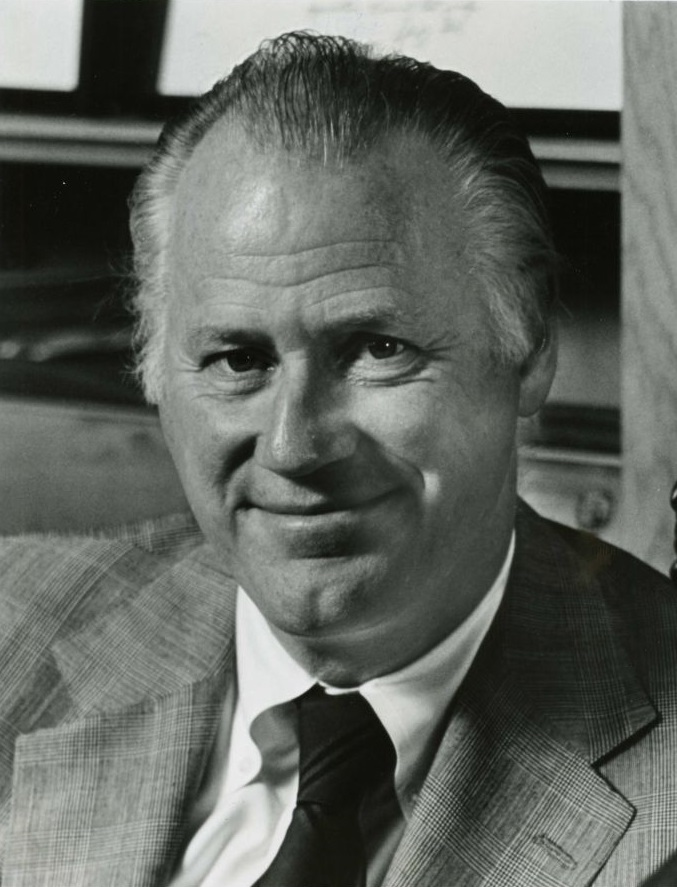
Bowie Kuhn in 1982

- February 2 – Pitchers Stan Coveleski and Waite Hoyt are voted into the Hall of Fame by the Special Veterans Committee.
- February 4 – Bowie Kuhn, 42, a partner with the National League's law firm, becomes the fifth permanent Commissioner of Baseball following a two-month-long search process. His term will continue through September 30, 1984, and especially be identified with changing player-owner relations and labor strife. Kuhn will be posthumously elected to the Hall of Fame in 2008.
- February 5 – The New York Mets trade catcher/first baseman Greg Goossen to the Seattle Pilots for a "player to be named later (PTBNL)". New York receives outfielder Jim Gosger on June 14 to complete the deal.
- February 12 – The St. Louis Cardinals purchase the contract of outfielder Byron Browne from the Houston Astros.
- February 17 – Spring training opens without 400 players who have decided to boycott it over the pension-fund impasse.
- February 21 – Hall of Fame hitter Ted Williams returns to uniform as manager of the Washington Senators. Enticed by new owner Bob Short, Williams will lead the 1969 Senators to the only winning season they will enjoy in the former expansion team's 11-year lifespan.
- February 25 – The MLBPA's spring training boycott ends when owners accept most of the players' terms.

=== March ===
- March 1 – Mickey Mantle announces his retirement at age 37 with 18 seasons, 2,401 games played, 536 homers, three MVP awards, 20 All-Star selections, seven World Series rings, and 12 American League pennants under his belt. He will be elected to the Baseball Hall of Fame in 1974.
- March 16 – A plane crash in Maracaibo, Venezuela, kills 155 people, including first baseman Carlos Santeliz, 20, the Venezuelan League Rookie of the Year, who is on his way to the Atlanta Braves' spring training camp. Another fatality is pitcher Néstor "Látigo" Chávez, 21, en route to the San Francisco Giants' camp; he had gone 12–5 with Double-A Waterbury in the Eastern League, including seven shutouts, in 1967, and posted a 1–0 record and 0.00 ERA in two relief appearances with San Francisco that September. Pitcher Pablo Torrealba, scheduled to take the ill-fated flight, misses it and takes a later one.
- March 17 – The Atlanta Braves and St. Louis Cardinals announce a one-for-one trade of All-Stars, with the Braves swapping Joe Torre for the Cardinals' Orlando Cepeda. Torre, 28, will convert from catcher to third base and win the 1971 National League Most Valuable Player Award; Cepeda, 31, is only two years removed from his 1967 NL MVP season. Both will become members of the Baseball Hall of Fame, although Torre (a nine-time All-Star and .297 lifetime hitter with 252 homers as a player) will be selected to recognize his managerial career.
- March 21 – Coming out of a one-year retirement, veteran left-hander Johnny Podres, 36, signs as a free agent with the brand-new San Diego Padres. Podres is a familiar figure in Southern California as a former stalwart for the Los Angeles Dodgers, whom he helped win the 1959 and 1963 World Series.
- March 28 – Still filling gaps in their maiden roster, the Padres acquire pitcher Tommie Sisk and catcher Chris Cannizzaro from the Pittsburgh Pirates for infielder Bobby Klaus and outfielder Ron Davis. Sisk will appear in 53 games on the mound and Cannizzaro will start 128 contests behind the plate for San Diego in 1969.
- March 31 – The Baltimore Orioles acquire veteran utility infielder Rutherford "Chico" Salmon from the Seattle Pilots for pitcher Gene Brabender and infielder Gordon Lund.

=== April ===
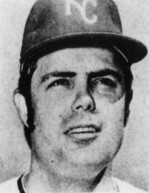
Lou Piniella as a Royal

- April 1 – The American League's two expansion teams make a deal, with the Kansas City Royals acquiring rookie outfielder Lou Piniella from the Seattle Pilots for pitcher John Gelnar and outfielder Steve Whitaker. Upon winning a regular job, Piniella, already 25, becomes the 1969 AL Rookie of the Year and permanently launches a 1,747-game MLB playing career that lasts into 1984.
- April 3 – Bill White, 35, returns to the St. Louis Cardinals when he's traded by the Philadelphia Phillies for infielders Jerry Buchek and Jim Hutto. First baseman White was a team leader who was selected to eight All-Star teams during his prior (1959–1965) tour as a Redbird.
- April 4 – The Cleveland Indians and California Angels swap veteran outfielders, with Cleveland reacquiring Chuck Hinton for former Los Angeles Dodger Lou Johnson. Hinton had appeared in 403 games over three seasons with the Indians between 1965 and 1967.
- April 8
  - In his first official baseball game since his near-fatal beaning on August 18, 1967, Tony Conigliaro goes two-for-four, cracks a two-run homer, and scores the eventual winning run in a 12-inning, Opening-Day 5–4 win for his Boston Red Sox over the Baltimore Orioles at Memorial Stadium. Conigliaro will appear in 141 games for the 1969 Bosox and hit 20 home runs during his comeback season.
  - At Shea Stadium, Dan McGinn hits the first home run in Montreal Expos history, a solo shot against Tom Seaver. The Expos withstand the New York Mets' four-run, ninth-inning rally to win their first National League game, 11–10.
  - At Anaheim Stadium, Mike Hegan hits the first home run in Seattle Pilots history, a two-run shot against Jim McGlothlin. The Pilots score four first inning runs and make them stand up for a 4–3 victory in their maiden AL contest.
  - At San Diego Stadium, Ed Spiezio hits the first home run in San Diego Padres history, a solo shot against Don Wilson of the Houston Astros. Spiezio's fifth-inning blow ties the Padres' first-ever NL game at one, and they'll push over winning run in the next frame. Dick Selma throws a five-hit complete game for the 2–1 triumph.
  - At Municipal Stadium, the Kansas City Royals, in their inaugural game, defeat the Minnesota Twins, 4–3 in 12 innings. Two pitching stars on the Baltimore Orioles team that won the 1966 World Series pitch for the Royals in this game: Wally Bunker throws the very first pitch, and Moe Drabowsky wins the game in relief. The Royals' first batter, Lou Piniella, gets the first hit for the franchise, leading off the game with a double, and scores their first run on Jerry Adair's single one batter later.
  - At Wrigley Field, the Chicago Cubs open their wild 1969 season in dramatic fashion, as Willie Smith smacks a pinch-hit, two-run, walk-off home run in the bottom of the 11th inning to defeat the Philadelphia Phillies, 7–6.
- April 9 – The Cubs' Billy Williams hits four consecutive doubles to tie the Major League record during an 11–3 win over the visiting Phillies. Chicago scores seven runs in the seventh inning.
- April 10 – At Shea Stadium, Tommie Agee of the New York Mets smashes what will be the longest home run in the ballpark's 45-year history, a 505 ft (154 m) blast into the upper deck in left field. The blow comes in the second inning off Larry Jaster of the Montreal Expos, and is one of Agee's two homers that help right-hander Gary Gentry triumph in his MLB debut, 4–1.
- April 11 – Seattle successfully introduces Major League Baseball to Sick's Stadium‚ as pitcher Gary Bell defeats the Chicago White Sox, 7–0. The Seattle Pilots attract 17‚850 today and will draw just 678‚000 for the season. U.S. Senator Henry "Scoop" Jackson throws out the first ball and will do the same in the Seattle Mariners opener‚ in 1977.
- April 12 – At Detroit, the Yankees' Mel Stottlemyre allows just one hit, a fourth-inning double to Jim Northrup, and beats Denny McLain and the Detroit Tigers, 4–0. For the third time in two years, Northrup saves the Tigers from being the victims of a no-hitter.
- April 13 – At the Oakland–Alameda County Coliseum, Mike Fiore hits the first home run in Kansas City Royals history, a solo shot against Blue Moon Odom.
- April 14 – In their home opener, the Montreal Expos host Canada's first major-league game, and emerge with an 8–7 victory over the St. Louis Cardinals, led by Mack Jones' first-inning three-run homer and Dan McGinn's stellar relief effort. A crowd of 29,184 pack Stade Parc Jarry (official capacity: 28,000), the smallest ballpark in the majors.
- April 15 – San Francisco Giants manager Clyde King orders seven intentional walks to be issued to Cincinnati Reds hitters in a 12-inning, 11–10 loss at Crosley Field.
- April 17
  - At Connie Mack Stadium, Bill Stoneman of the Montreal Expos no-hits the Philadelphia Phillies, 7–0. The game is only the ninth in Expos history, and only the fifth start in Stoneman's Major League career. Stoneman walks five and fans eight.
  - Five days after he drops a 5–1 decision to Juan Marichal in his first and only start with the San Diego Padres, veteran right-hander Al McBean, 30, is traded to the Los Angeles Dodgers for pitcher Leon Everitt and shortstop Tommy Dean.
- April 18 – After six years of inactivity, the Triple-A American Association is reborn in the Western and Midwestern United States. With six clubs—Denver, Indianapolis, Oklahoma City and Tulsa, which transfer from the Pacific Coast League, and two startup franchises, Des Moines and Omaha—the Association is revived as MLB's two leagues expand to 24 teams and divisional play. It will add Evansville and Wichita in 1970, to join the PCL and International League as eight-team, Triple-A circuits.

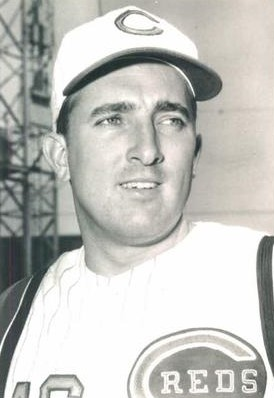
Jim Maloney

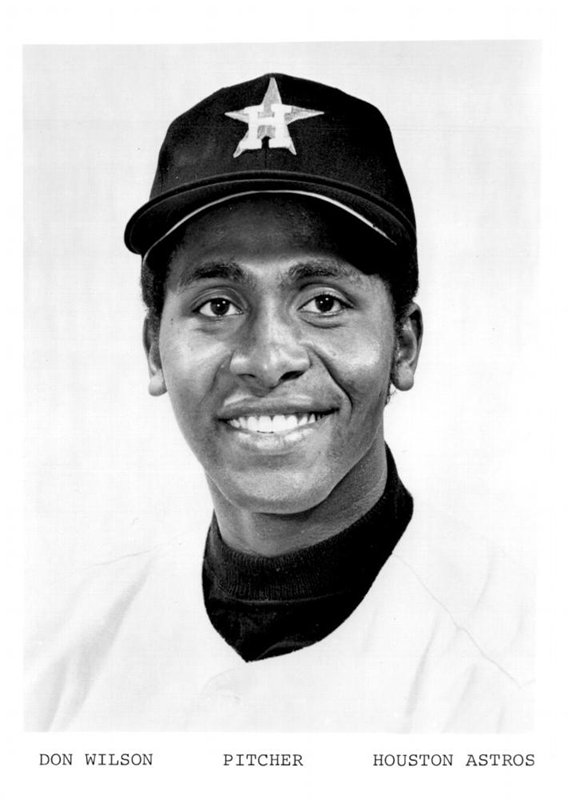
Don Wilson

- April 19 – The Boston Red Sox trade outfielder Ken Harrelson, the reigning American League RBI champion, to the Cleveland Indians with pitchers Juan Pizarro and Dick Ellsworth for pitchers Vicente Romo and Sonny Siebert and catcher Joe Azcue; a stunned Harrelson, however, refuses to report to Cleveland, citing his extensive business interests in Boston. After meeting with general manager Gabe Paul and manager Alvin Dark, Harrelson will relent and join the Indian lineup on April 24 against the New York Yankees at Cleveland Stadium.
- April 25 – The Chicago Cubs trade pitchers Joe Niekro and Gary Ross and shortstop Francisco Libran to the San Diego Padres for right-hander Dick Selma.
- April 27 – The Washington Senators score six runs in the fourth inning—highlighted by pitcher Frank Bertaina's three-run homer—and make those runs stand up in a 6–5 triumph over the Cleveland Indians at Cleveland Municipal Stadium. The Indians, a first division team in 1968, have lost 15 of their first 16 games of 1969.
- April 30 – Cincinnati Reds fireballer Jim Maloney throws his second career no-hitter, blanking the Houston Astros, 10–0, at Crosley Field. Maloney, whose first no-no occurred on August 19, 1965, walks five and fans 13.

=== May ===
- May 1
  - The Houston Astros, held hitless the day before by Jim Maloney, answer back as Don Wilson pitches his second career no-hit game, a 4–0 victory over the Cincinnati Reds; he notches 13 strikeouts and walks six. On defense, Houston ties a National League record with just one assist. The back-to-back no-hitters are only the second in MLB history, the feat having been accomplished just the year before by Gaylord Perry and Ray Washburn. Wilson, 23, threw his first no-hitter on June 18, 1967.
  - Al López, 60, hands over the managerial reins of the Chicago White Sox (8–9 in 1969) to Don Gutteridge, a longtime coach. His retirement gives López a career record of 1,410–1,004 (.584) with two American League pennants in 17 seasons as skipper of the Cleveland Indians (1951–1956) and the White Sox (1957–1965, 1968–1969). That record, plus his 1,919 games caught over 19 seasons as one of MLB's premier catchers of the 1930s and 1940s, earns López a 1977 berth in the Baseball Hall of Fame.
- May 2 – There's a one-hitter in the American League: Dick Bosman of the Washington Senators allows only a second-inning single to the Cleveland Indians' Tony Horton in a 5–0 triumph at RFK Stadium. Ted Williams' surprising Senators are now 14–11 and in second place in the AL East. Bosman will throw a no-hitter as a member of the Indians on July 19, 1974.
- May 4 – At Anaheim Stadium, in only the 25th game in Kansas City Royals history, Bob Oliver goes 6-for-6 with a home run and a double in the Royals' 15–1 drubbing of the California Angels. Oliver becomes the first player to collect six hits in one game since Jesús Alou did so for the San Francisco Giants on July 10, 1964, and the first American League player to do so since Floyd Robinson with the Chicago White Sox on July 22, 1962.
- May 12 – Bob Gibson of the St. Louis Cardinals becomes the seventh pitcher in National League history to strike out the side on nine pitches, fanning Len Gabrielson, Paul Popovich and John Miller in the seventh inning of a game against the Los Angeles Dodgers. Gibson enjoys his feat as part of a 6–2 victory for St. Louis.
- May 13 – Ernie Banks of the Chicago Cubs reaches the 1,500 runs batted in milestone while driving in seven runs in a 19–0 shellacking of the expansion San Diego Padres. Hard-throwing right-hander Dick Selma earns the victory as the Cubs tie a modern-day record for the most one-sided shutout in National League history.
- May 15 – Dave McNally of the Baltimore Orioles one-hits the Minnesota Twins and defeats fellow southpaw Jim Kaat at Metropolitan Stadium, 5–0. César Tovar spoils the no-hitter with a one-out, ninth-inning single.
- May 16 – At Fenway Park, the Seattle Pilots and Boston Red Sox score a combined 11 runs in the 11th inning, as Seattle hangs on to win, 10–9. The Pilots slug three homers (by John Kennedy, Tommy Harper and Wayne Comer) in the visitors' half of the frame to take a 10–4 lead in the extra-innings contest, then withstand a five-run Bosox comeback to hold on. Reliever Jim Bouton, now a knuckleball artist, throws three hitless, shutout innings to gain his first victory as a Pilot.
- May 18 – Tying a major league record, the Minnesota Twins of rookie manager Billy Martin steal five bases in the third inning against the Detroit Tigers' battery of Mickey Lolich and Bill Freehan. Four of the steals occur during a single Harmon Killebrew at-bat, and two of the steals, by César Tovar and Rod Carew, are of home plate.
- May 20 – The New York Yankees acquire former American League saves leader Jack Aker from the Seattle Pilots for right-hander Fred Talbot.
- May 26 – In the throes of a ten-game losing streak, and sitting in last place in the AL West at 11–28, the California Angels fire Bill Rigney, the only manager the team has had since its debut in 1961. Lefty Phillips, former pitching coach of the Los Angeles Dodgers, replaces him.

=== June ===
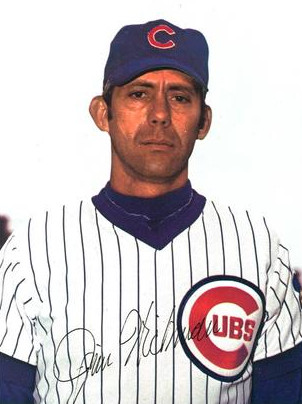
Jim Hickman

- June 4 – Jack DiLauro, Tug McGraw and Ron Taylor combine for 15 shutout innings, as their New York Mets squeeze out a 1–0 victory at Shea Stadium against the Los Angeles Dodgers. The winning run is unearned, when centerfielder Willie Davis' error enables Tommie Agee to score from first base.
- June 5 – Jeff Burroughs (Washington Senators) and J. R. Richard (Houston Astros) are the top two selections in the 1969 June amateur draft. With the 55th pick overall, the Minnesota Twins pluck a future Hall of Famer, Bert Blyleven, out of the draft pool in the third round.
- June 8 – At Los Angeles, the first-year Montreal Expos hold off the hometown Dodgers, 4–3—ending their 20-game losing streak. The Expos, now 12–37 (.245), have been winless since May 10. Rusty Staub and Mack Jones hit home runs, and 41-year-old reliever Roy Face quells a ninth-inning Dodger rally to preserve starter Jerry Robertson's victory. The Expos' 20-game skid is tied for fourth-most, all time (through 2024).
- June 11
  - Maury Wills returns to the city and team of his breakthrough stardom (1959–1966), when the Montreal Expos send him to the Los Angeles Dodgers with ace pinch hitter Manny Mota for first baseman Ron Fairly and utility infielder Paul Popovich. Wills, 36, will regain his old shortstop job through 1971 and steal 69 bases in 456 games in his second Dodger tour, which ends October 4, 1972.
  - The Expos immediately deal Popovich to his original team, the Chicago Cubs, in exchange for pitcher Jack Lamabe and outfielder Adolfo Phillips.
  - Joe Lahoud, second-year Boston Red Sox outfielder, clouts three home runs (his first long balls of 1969) in a 13–5 rout of the Minnesota Twins at Metropolitan Stadium.
- June 13
  - The New York Mets sell the contract of veteran left-hander Al Jackson to the Cincinnati Reds. Jackson has posted a poor 10.64 ERA, with 18 hits allowed in only 11 innings, in nine games during 1969, and the transaction means that this "Original Met", now 33, will not be a part of the "Miracle Mets'" historic pennant drive and postseason success to come.
  - The Atlanta Braves, currently holding first place in the NL West by a single game, obtain veteran outfielder Tony González from the San Diego Padres for catcher Walt Hriniak, third baseman Van Kelly and outfield prospect Andy Finlay. González, 32, will start 76 games in left- and centerfield for the Braves through the rest of the regular season and bat .357 in 14 at bats during the 1969 NLCS.
- June 14
  - At Fenway Park, the Oakland Athletics lash 25 hits, most by a team in 1969, and put up three separate five-run innings in a 21–7 beat down of the Boston Red Sox. The 21 runs also set an MLB standard for this season. Young Oakland outfielder Reggie Jackson goes five for six, including his 21st and 22nd homers of the season, and knocks in ten runs, most by anyone in a 1969 game.
  - The New York Yankees cut ties with 1962 AL Rookie of the Year Tom Tresh, sending the 30-year-old outfielder to his home-state Detroit Tigers for fellow outfielder Ron Woods.
- June 15
  - The Montreal Expos deal first baseman Donn Clendenon to the New York Mets in exchange for pitcher Steve Renko, infielder Kevin Collins, two minor-league pitchers (Jay Carden and David Colon), and a "player to be named later" (third base prospect Terry Dailey). Clendenon will be selected MVP of the 1969 World Series.
  - The Boston Red Sox trade unhappy catcher Joe Azcue to the California Angels for fellow backstop Tom Satriano.
- June 19 – Chicago Cubs manager Leo Durocher, 63, weds for the fourth time, marrying 40-year-old Lynne Walker Goldblatt.
- June 21 – The Minnesota Twins and Oakland Athletics enter the tenth inning tied 3–3, then the Twins, keyed by a Harmon Killebrew homer, score 11 runs in the top of the inning, and beat Oakland, 14–4. Minnesota's 11-run extra-innings outburst equals a record set by the 1928 New York Yankees.
- June 22 – Jim Hickman's two-run homer in the bottom of the ninth is the winning blow and enables the NL East-leading Chicago Cubs (43–24) to overcome a four-run deficit and defeat the Montreal Expos, 7–6, in the first game of a doubleheader at Wrigley Field. On the spur of the moment, Ron Santo leaps in the air and clicks his heels three times as he runs to the home team's left-field clubhouse. Santo's signature "victory dance" becomes a hit with euphoric Cub fans.

=== July ===
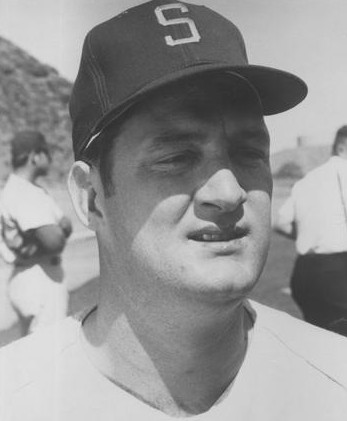
Don Mincher

- July 4 – At the customary half-way point in MLB's first four-division season, the Chicago Cubs (52–28) lead the surprising New York Mets (44–34) by seven games in the National League East; the Atlanta Braves (47–32) lead the Los Angeles Dodgers (45–32) by a game in the NL West; the rampaging Baltimore Orioles (55–24) enjoy a ten-game advantage over the defending world-champion Detroit Tigers (43–32) in the American League East; and the Oakland Athletics (44–34) and Minnesota Twins (42–32) are in a two-team race, virtually tied for the top spot in the AL West.
- July 8 – With three runs in the ninth inning, the New York Mets beat the Chicago Cubs 4–3, cutting Chicago's lead in the National League East to four games. Chicago's Ron Santo rips into center fielder Don Young for two misplays in the outfield; Santo apologizes the next day for criticizing Young, who had left early and didn't take the team bus. Santo is later booed in his first game back at Wrigley Field.
- July 9 – With one out in the ninth inning, the Chicago Cubs' Jim Qualls lines a single to left center to break up Tom Seaver's perfect game bid. The New York Mets' 4–0 victory over the Cubs at Shea Stadium would go down in history as "Tom Seaver's Imperfect Game".
- July 13 – In the third meeting between the two brothers, the San Diego Padres' Joe Niekro defeats Phil Niekro of the Atlanta Braves, 1–0. The triumph gives Joe a 2–1 record over his Cooperstown-bound elder brother.
- July 17 – Jim Kaat improves to 10–6 with an 8–5 victory for the Minnesota Twins over the Chicago White Sox despite committing three errors. The Hall-of-Fame southpaw is in the midst of a streak of 16 consecutive Gold Glove Awards for his fielding (1962–1977).
- July 23 – At R.F.K. Memorial Stadium, Willie McCovey hits two home runs as the National League beats the American League 9–3, for its seventh straight All-Star Game win. McCovey is named MVP, with his two homers tying an All-Star Game record set by Arky Vaughan (1941), Ted Williams (1946) and Al Rosen (1954). The game is postponed by one day after heavy rains in the Washington, D.C. area. When the AL's Don Mincher pinch-hit in the fourth inning, he became a trivia answer: the only Seattle Pilot to appear in an All-Star game.
- July 26 – Randy Hundley drives in all three Cub runs, including a walk-off single in the 11th inning, to lead the Cubs to a 3–2 win over the Los Angeles Dodgers at Wrigley Field.
- July 27
  - The year's longest MLB game, by innings, takes place at Sick's Stadium, when the Boston Red Sox and host Seattle Pilots struggle for 20 innings until Boston comes out with a 5–3 victory. The game is 1–1 through 18, then each team scores a run in the 19th. Ultimately, in the 20th, Joe Lahoud's two-run homer off Bob Locker decides matters. The two teams use a total of 15 pitchers.
  - In the most one-sided shutout in Baltimore Orioles history, the Os defeat the Chicago White Sox, 17–0, at Memorial Stadium. Jim Hardin pitches a two-hit shutout, walking none, and hits a three-run home run in the bottom of the fourth off of Gary Bell to make it 13–0. The Orioles will plate four more runs and belt out 20 hits. Bobby Knoop has both hits for the White Sox. Hardin retires the last 20 batters in a row that he faces. In Baltimore's 100th game of the season, they are 69–31 and lead the Detroit Tigers by 12½ games in the newly formed American League East.
- July 29 – Willie McCovey hits his 300th career home run helping the San Francisco Giants beat the Chicago Cubs, 4–2.
- July 30
  - The Houston Astros's Denis Menke and Jimmy Wynn each slug grand-slam home runs in the ninth inning of the opening game of a midweek doubleheader at Shea Stadium against the New York Mets, to turn the Astros' 5–3 lead into a 16–3 "laugher". It's also the first time in the National League's modern era (post-1901) that two teammates hit "slams" in the same inning.
  - In third inning of the nightcap, the scuffling Mets trail, 7–0, when Houston's Johnny Edwards doubles to left field. Mets' outfielder Cleon Jones, an All-Star who'll hit .340 in 1969, is slow to retrieve the ball and then makes a "lackadaisical" throw back to the infield, making the deficit 8–0. Mets manager Gil Hodges emerges from the dugout and walks all the way to left field to confer with Jones. When Hodges exits the field, Jones follows him and is replaced by Ron Swoboda. Hodges keeps Jones out of his lineup for the next two games and uses him only as a pinch hitter in the two contests after that. Newspapers report that Jones is benched for failure to hustle, and Hodges decides to do so publicly to show his team that he will not tolerate lack of effort, even from its star player. Ultimately defeated 11–5 and swept in the twin bill, the Mets end the day 55–43, trailing the Chicago Cubs by five full games in the NL East; although they go only 7–8 after today's incident, they'll eventually win 38 of their final 49 regular-season contests to capture the division, the first milestone en route to their 1969 "Miracle".

=== August ===
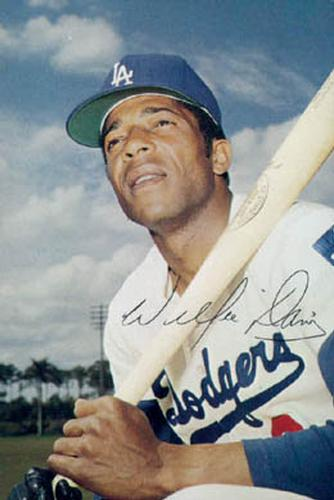
Willie Davis

- August 1
  - Willie Davis of the Los Angeles Dodgers begins his 31-game hit streak. Coming into today's game against the St. Louis Cardinals at Busch Memorial Stadium, Davis is hitting .260 — but by the time the streak ends on September 4 Willie's average is .318. He hits .459 during the streak and breaks the Dodgers' franchise record of 29 games set by Zack Wheat. The 31-game hit streak is the third-longest in National League history and as of 2023 remains the Dodgers' record.
  - In the first inning of today's 4–3 loss to the host Oakland Athletics, Carl Yastrzemski, two-time defending American League batting champion and 1967 MVP, is removed from the Boston Red Sox' lineup and fined $500 by manager Dick Williams for not hustling. Yastrzemski is benched for not running hard from third base on a slow infield grounder and being thrown out at home plate to end a Boston rally. He also had failed to hustle on the bases during the previous night's game against the California Angels in Anaheim.
- August 5 – The Pittsburgh Pirates' Willie Stargell hits the first home run completely out of Dodger Stadium. Los Angeles pitcher Alan Foster surrenders the 506-foot blast. To date, it's the longest home run in Dodger Stadium history. (Stargell will hit another homer out of Dodger Stadium, off Andy Messersmith in 1973.) The mammoth home run comes in the seventh inning and breaks a 3–3 tie, a three-run home run by Andy Kosco having tied the game for the Dodgers in the bottom of the sixth; Pittsburgh scores seven more runs in the ninth inning and defeats Los Angeles 11–3.
- August 6
  - Minnesota Twins manager Billy Martin throws a punch that knocks out one of his starting pitchers, Dave Boswell, in an alley behind a Detroit bar. Martin claims he's breaking up an altercation between Boswell and Twins outfielder Bob Allison; the pitcher says Martin is the instigator. Minnesota is 78–62 and leads the AL West by three games; Boswell is 12–9 (3.45) in 26 starts. Boswell demands a meeting with club owner Calvin Griffith to clear the air before he returns to action August 18. He will go 8–3 the rest of the way, with his 20 victories helping the Twins win their division. Martin will be fired after the club is swept in the 1969 ALCS.
  - The Philadelphia Phillies (44–64 and fifth in the six-team National League East), fire second-year manager Bob Skinner. Coach George Myatt takes over on an interim basis through season's end.
- August 10
  - Citing damage to his right shoulder, Don Drysdale retires from the Los Angeles Dodgers. The future Hall of Famer is 33 and has a 5–4 record with a 4.45 earned run average in 12 starts this season, and he will retire with a 209–166 (2.95) career mark. He is the last player still playing for the Dodgers who also played in Brooklyn.
  - At Baltimore, the Orioles' Mike Cuellar allows only one hit, a top-of-the-ninth single to César Tovar, and beats the Minnesota Twins 2–0. For the second time this season, Tovar saves the Twins from being no-hit against Baltimore. He broke up a no-hitter by Dave McNally in the ninth inning during a game in May.
- August 13
  - Montreal reliever Roy Face gives up the last of his record 21 extra-inning home runs, an 11th-inning grand slam to the Cincinnati Reds' Johnny Bench. Cincinnati wins 8–3 in Montreal.
  - Only four days after coming off the disabled list, Jim Palmer of the Baltimore Orioles no-hits the Oakland Athletics 8–0 at Memorial Stadium. The home plate umpire is Lou DiMuro, whose son Mike would call balls and strikes for Roy Halladay's perfect game May 29, 2010.
- August 14 – In the National League East Division, the Chicago Cubs lead the St. Louis Cardinals by 8½ games and the New York Mets by 9½ games.
- August 15 – The Los Angeles Dodgers acquire starting pitcher Jim Bunning, 37, from the Pittsburgh Pirates for infielder Chuck Goggin, minor-league outfielder Ron Mitchell, and cash. Two games out of first place in a five-team NL West divisional race, the Dodgers hope that future Hall-of-Famer Bunning will bolster a rotation recently depleted by the retirement of Don Drysdale.
- August 19 – At Wrigley Field, Ken Holtzman of the Chicago Cubs no-hits the Atlanta Braves 3–0 with no strikeouts. Only one other pitcher in major league history, Sad Sam Jones in 1923, has hurled a no-hitter without the benefit of a strikeout. Holtzman survives a scare in the seventh as Hank Aaron's fly ball to deep left field leading off the inning appears to be going over the wall for a home run; however, a stiff wind cuts into the ball and enables Billy Williams to catch it at the warning track. Aaron grounds out to Cubs' second baseman Glenn Beckert for the game's final out.
- August 30 – The Houston Astros, four games out of first place in the NL West's furious divisional scramble, make their second trade in six days with the Seattle Pilots, obtaining hard-hitting Tommy Davis, 30, a two-time former NL batting champion, for fellow outfielders Sandy Valdespino and Danny Walton. On August 24, Houston had picked up relief pitcher Jim Bouton, 30, from Seattle for pitchers Roric Harrison and Dooley Womack. Bouton is secretly working on a diary/memoir of his season, to be published in 1970 as Ball Four.

=== September ===
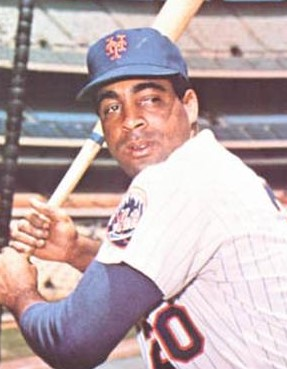
Tommie Agee

- September 1 – Labor Day action concludes in MLB's first season of divisional play, and there are three pennant races. In the National League West, only 5½ games separate five teams: the San Francisco Giants (75–59) lead the Cincinnati Reds (72–57) and Los Angeles Dodgers (73–58) by a half game, with the Atlanta Braves (73–63) three games out and Houston Astros (69–64) still in the fight. In the NL East, the Chicago Cubs (82–52) are maintaining their top spot, with the New York Mets (76–55) 4½ back. The AL West sees the Minnesota Twins (80–52) holding a 5½-game advantage over the Oakland Athletics (74–57). The only noncompetitive division is the AL East, where the Baltimore Orioles (92–43) have cruised to a 13-game margin over the Detroit Tigers (78–55).
- September 8 – The Atlanta Braves bolster their pitching staff for the stretch run, acquiring future Hall-of-Famer Hoyt Wilhelm, 47, and Bob Priddy, 29, from the California Angels for two prospects, southpaw Clint Compton, 19, and outfielder Mickey Rivers, 20.
- September 8–9 – The tide turns in the National League East race during a dramatic two-game showdown between the second-place New York Mets and front-running Chicago Cubs at Shea Stadium.
  - On September 8, Cubs starter Bill Hands knocks down Mets' leadoff batter Tommie Agee in the first inning. Jerry Koosman hits the next Cub he faces, Ron Santo, in the hand. Agee hits a two-run home run in the third, and the Mets win 3–2, cutting the Cubbies' division lead to 1½ games.
  - On September 9, the Mets ride Tom Seaver's 21st victory and 14th complete game to 7–1 triumph over the Cubs and trim Chicago's edge to only a half-game; in the fourth inning, a black cat jumps on the field and runs past Santo in the on-deck circle.
- September 10 – A loss by the Cubs—to the Philadelphia Phillies, 6–2, at Connie Mack Stadium—and a doubleheader sweep by the Mets—over the visiting Montreal Expos by 3–2 and 6–1 scores—propel the New Yorkers into first place in the NL East, a lead they will not relinquish through the end of the regular season.
- September 15 – The St. Louis Cardinals' Steve Carlton strikes out a record 19 New York Mets, but Carlton loses the game 4–3 at Busch Stadium. New York's division lead is now 4½ games.
- September 18 – Despite leading the Oakland Athletics to an 80–69 record, the franchise's best showing in 21 years, manager Hank Bauer is replaced by John McNamara at the team's helm. It is owner Charles O. Finley's ninth managerial change in nine years, and Bauer's second enforced departure from the job (he had skippered Finley's Athletics from June 19, 1961 through 1962).
- September 20 – At Shea Stadium, Bob Moose of the Pittsburgh Pirates no-hits the New York Mets 4–0.
- September 21 – At Candlestick Park, the San Francisco Giants defeat the Los Angeles Dodgers 4–3 in 10 innings as Maury Wills commits an error on Jim Davenport's ground ball, allowing Willie McCovey to score the winning run. Ironically, this game marks Dodger Bill Buckner's major league debut; Buckner, who grounds out to second baseman Ron Hunt while pinch-hitting for pitcher Jim Brewer in the ninth inning, will become well known for Mookie Wilson's ground ball going through his legs in Game 6 of the 1986 World Series.
- September 22
  - Willie Mays hits his 600th career home run helping the San Francisco Giants beat the San Diego Padres 4–2.
  - The Minnesota Twins survive a ninth-inning scare to beat the Kansas City Royals 4–3 and clinch the AL West title on Harmon Killebrew's 47th home run and César Tovar's two run-scoring singles.
- September 23 – Dick Williams is fired as manager of the Boston Red Sox less than two years after leading them to their 1967 "Impossible Dream" pennant. The 1969 Red Sox are 82–71, third in the American League East, and 24 games behind Baltimore. Coach Eddie Popowski becomes temporary pilot. Later today, Carl Yastrzemski hits his 200th career home run, helping the Red Sox beat the New York Yankees 8–3.
- September 24 – After seven losing seasons, the eight-year-old New York Mets clinch the National League East Division title as Donn Clendenon hits two home runs in a 6–0 win over Steve Carlton and the St. Louis Cardinals. The Mets will go 39–11 from August 14 through October 2, 1969; the Cubs, 18–27 over the same span, will finish eight games behind the Mets, and not win the division until exactly 15 years from this day.
- September 25 – The Pittsburgh Pirates (84–73 and third in the NL East) dismiss their second-year manager, Larry Shepard. Coach Alex Grammas takes the helm as temporary skipper for the season's final five games.
- September 26 – Veteran minor leaguer Frank Lucchesi is appointed manager of the 1970 Philadelphia Phillies. Lucchesi, 43, is promoted to his first MLB job after developing players for 14 years in the Phils' farm system, and winning a division title with the Triple-A Eugene Emeralds of the Pacific Coast League.
- September 30 – The Atlanta Braves (98–62) clinch the 1969 NL West championship when they defeat the Cincinnati Reds 3–2 before a home crowd of 43,974. Phil Niekro improves to 23–13, as the Braves clinch their first postseason berth since 1958, and first since moving to Georgia in 1966.

=== October ===
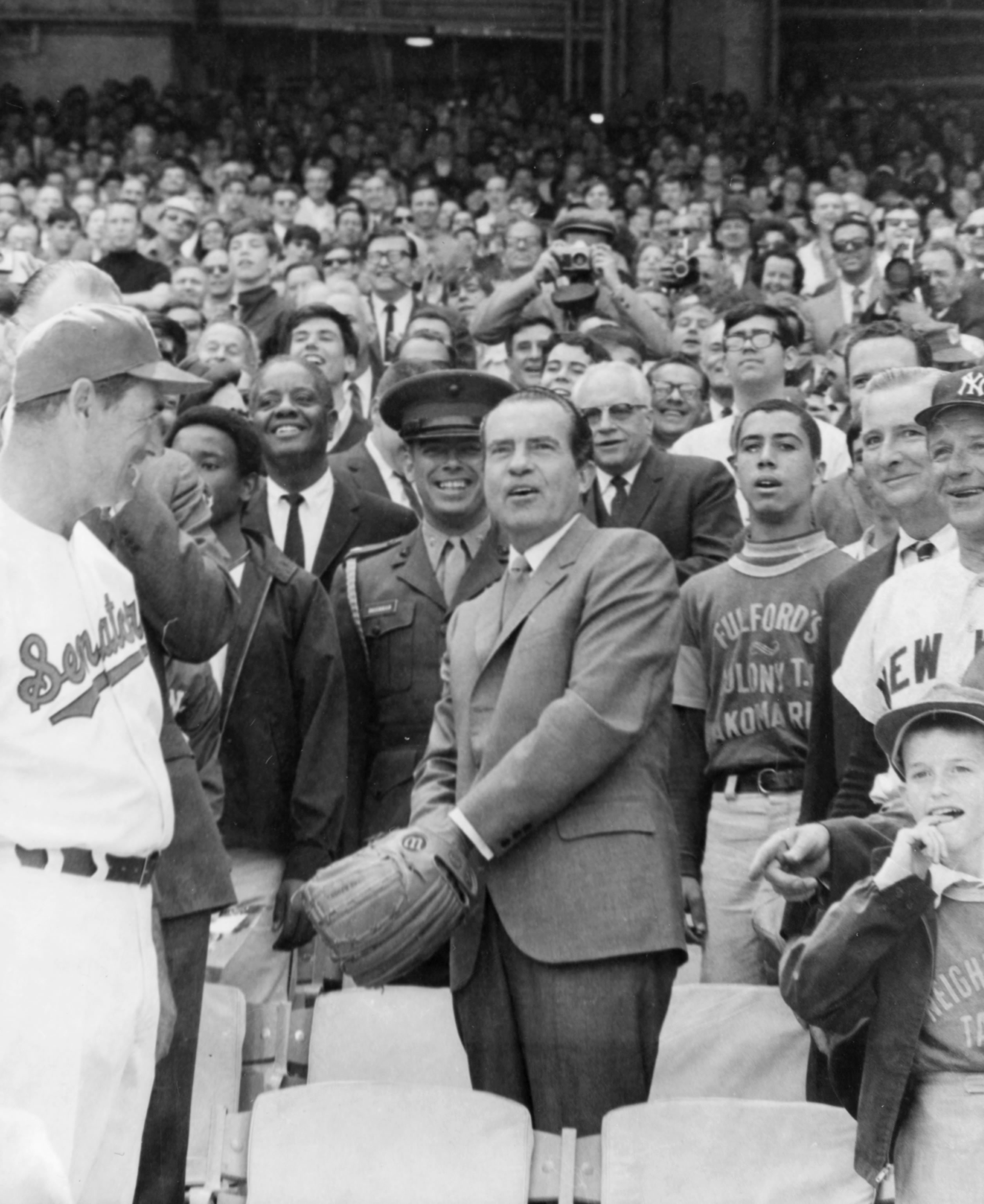
Ted Williams, Richard Nixon and Ralph Houk (right) at April's "Presidential Opener"

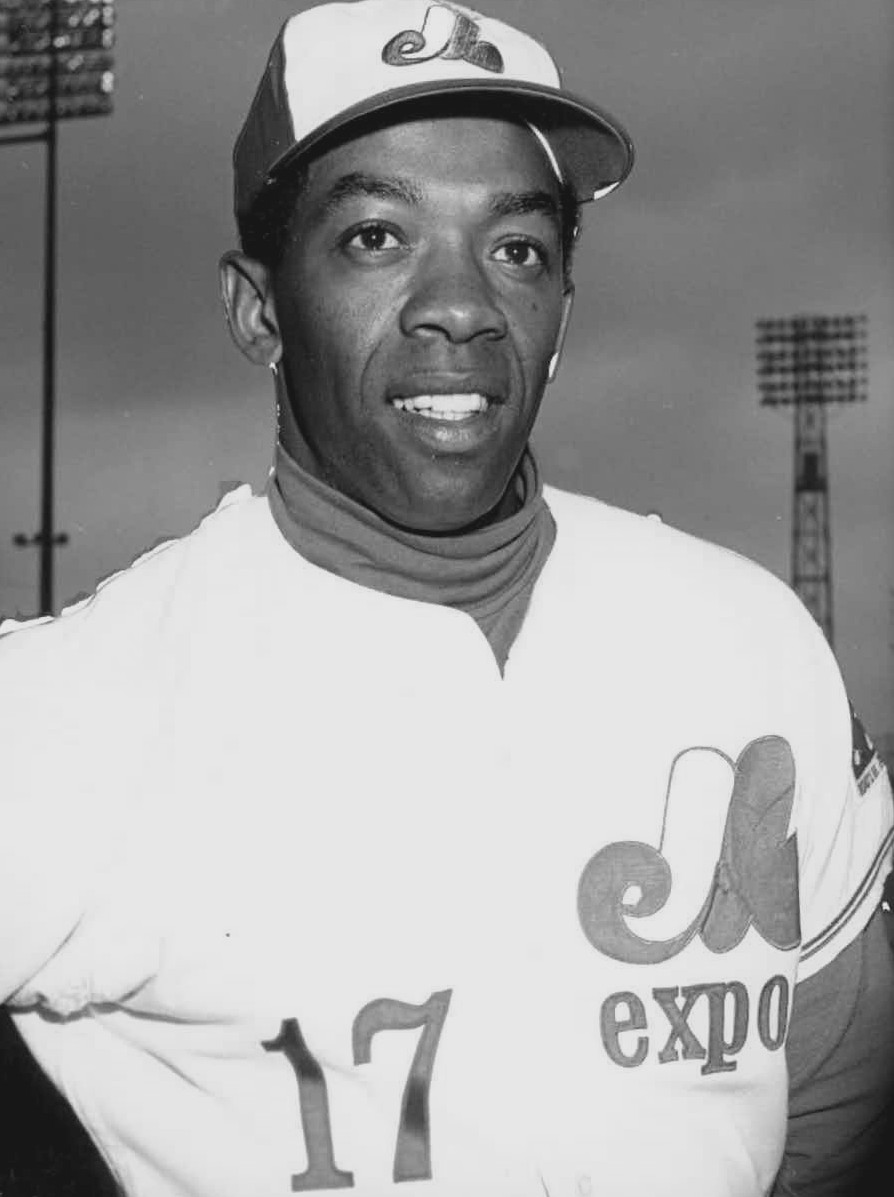
Donn Clendenon

- October 1 – Ted Williams' debut season as manager of the Washington Senators ends on a triumphant note when Washington defeats Williams' longtime team, the Boston Red Sox, 3–2 behind Joe Coleman Jr., a Massachusetts native, at RFK Stadium. The 86–76 Senators finish fourth in the AL East, one game behind the Red Sox, but it is the most successful season in the nine-year-old expansion team's history.
- October 2 – The Seattle Pilots finish what will be their only season in the Emerald City with a 3–1 loss to the Oakland Athletics at Sick's Stadium. The city of Seattle would not host another MLB team until the birth of the Mariners in 1977.
- October 4 – The American League and National League Championship Series begin, the first such series to feature the respective leagues' division champions. The Baltimore Orioles will sweep the Minnesota Twins in three games for the AL pennant; the New York Mets will do the same against the Atlanta Braves for the NL crown.
- October 7 – The St. Louis Cardinals trade Curt Flood to the Philadelphia Phillies in a seven-player deal that also sends Tim McCarver, Byron Browne and Joe Hoerner to the Phillies and Dick Allen, Cookie Rojas and Jerry Johnson to the Cardinals. Flood, however, refuses to report to the Phillies and instead challenges baseball's reserve clause in a lawsuit that eventually reaches the Supreme Court. He will sit out the entire 1970 season.
- October 8 – After firing Dave Bristol as manager despite an 89–73 season, the Cincinnati Reds hire Sparky Anderson to replace him. During the next seven seasons, Anderson, who will make his major league managerial debut in 1970, will guide the team known as the "Big Red Machine" to five National League West titles, four National League pennants, and back-to-back World Series titles in 1975 and 1976.
- October 9 – The Pittsburgh Pirates rehire Danny Murtaugh as their manager for what will be his third of four terms as Pirates skipper. This stint will see the Pirates win the 1970 National League East title for their first postseason berth since winning the 1960 World Series (with Murtaugh at the helm), as well as winning the 1971 World Series.
- October 13 – In the first of many firings in his career, Minnesota Twins manager Billy Martin is sacked by owner Calvin Griffith after his Twins are swept in the American League Championship Series. The Twins also release two veterans, relief pitcher Al Worthington, 40, and catcher and 1969 AL All-Star John Roseboro, 36.
- October 15 – Baltimore Orioles manager Earl Weaver is warned during Game 4 of the 1969 World Series by umpire Shag Crawford not to argue balls and strikes. After receiving this warning, Weaver follows Crawford to home plate, and immediately is ejected. The Mets would win 2–1 in 10 innings for a 3–1 lead in the World Series.
- October 16 – The Baltimore Orioles are ahead 3–0 in Game 5 of the World Series at Shea Stadium when Dave McNally strikes New York Mets batter Cleon Jones in the foot with a pitch. However, home plate umpire Lou DiMuro ruled that the ball missed Jones. Mets manager Gil Hodges emerges from the dugout to argue and shows DiMuro the shoe-polish-smudged ball. DiMuro reverses his call, and awards Jones first base. The following batter, Donn Clendenon, hits a two-run home run to pull the Mets within a run of Baltimore. (The homer is Clendenon's third of the Series). Following an Al Weis solo home run in the seventh to tie the game, the Mets score two in the eighth for a 5–3 lead. Jerry Koosman pitches a complete game for the Mets, who win the World Series in five games. Clendenon is named World Series MVP.
- October 21 – The St. Louis Cardinals trade pitcher Dave Giusti and catcher Dave Ricketts to the Pittsburgh Pirates for catcher/outfielder Carl Taylor and minor-league outfielder Frank Vanzin.
- October 29 – Right-hander Jim Bunning returns to the Philadelphia Phillies as a free agent after being released one week earlier by the Los Angeles Dodgers. Bunning, 38, had gone 74–46 for the Phils between 1964 and 1967.

=== November ===
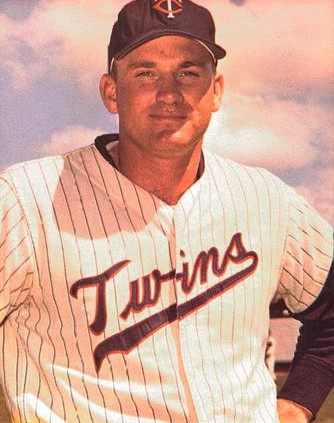
Harmon Killebrew

- November 5 – Two right-handed pitchers change teams when the Cincinnati Reds trade George Culver to the St. Louis Cardinals for Ray Washburn.
- November 12 – Harmon Killebrew of the Minnesota Twins is voted the American League's Most Valuable Player after he led the league with 49 home runs, 140 RBI, and a .430 on-base percentage.
- November 17 – The Philadelphia Phillies deal outfielder Johnny Callison, 30, a four-time former NL All-Star, and pitcher Larry Colton ("PTBNL") to the Chicago Cubs for pitcher Dick Selma and outfielder Oscar Gamble.
- November 20 – Willie McCovey of the San Francisco Giants is voted National League Most Valuable Player after he led the league with 45 home runs, 126 RBI, and a .453 on-base percentage and .656 slugging percentage.
- November 21 – The Cleveland Indians send José Cardenal to the St. Louis Cardinals for fellow outfielder Vada Pinson.
- November 24 – A busy offseason of managerial changes in the American League concludes when Dave Bristol, fired by the Cincinnati Reds in October, replaces Joe Schultz at the helm of the Seattle Pilots; earlier, Eddie Kasko was named Dick Williams' permanent successor with the Boston Red Sox (October 2); Charlie Metro replaced Joe Gordon with the Kansas City Royals (October 8); and Bill Rigney, dismissed by the California Angels in May, took over the Minnesota Twins (October 22, nine days after Billy Martin's firing). Oakland owner Charles O. Finley didn't wait for the off-season, having switched pilots September 18.
- November 25
  - Kansas City Royals outfielder Lou Piniella, who hit .282 with 11 home runs and 68 RBI, is named American League Rookie of the Year over pitcher Mike Nagy (12–2, 3.11 ERA), outfielder Carlos May (.281, 18, 62) and pitcher Ken Tatum (7–2, 1.36).
  - The Cincinnati Reds trade hard-hitting outfielder Alex Johnson (.315, 17 HR, 88 RBI) and utility infielder Chico Ruiz to the California Angels for pitchers Pedro Borbón, Vern Geishert and Jim McGlothlin. Johnson will win the 1970 American League batting title (.329) but, in 1971, frequent clashes with Angel management lead to a long suspension, a successful arbitration case, and his trade from the team.
- November 28 – Second baseman Ted Sizemore becomes the seventh Dodgers player to be named the NL Rookie of the Year. Sizemore joins Jackie Robinson (1947), Don Newcombe (1949), Joe Black (1952), Junior Gilliam (1953), Frank Howard (1960) and Jim Lefebvre (1965).

=== December ===
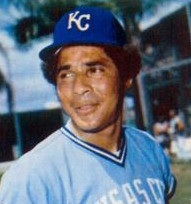
Amos Otis

- December 3
  - The Kansas City Royals acquire future five-time American League All-Star and 3x Gold Glove Award winning centerfielder Amos Otis, 22, and pitcher Bob Johnson from the New York Mets for third baseman Joe Foy.
  - The Atlanta Braves trade veteran outfielder Felipe Alou to the Oakland Athletics for pitcher Jim Nash.
  - The Montreal Expos acquire veteran hurler Joe Sparma from the Detroit Tigers for fellow right-hander Jerry Robertson.
- December 4
  - Chub Feeney, San Francisco Giants' vice president, succeeds retiring Warren Giles as president of the National League.
  - The Detroit Tigers send pitcher Pat Dobson and infielder Dave Campbell to the San Diego Padres for pitcher Joe Niekro.
  - The New York Yankees deal first baseman Joe Pepitone, a seven-year veteran and holdover from the Bombers' early-decade glory days, to the Houston Astros for outfielder/first baseman Curt Blefary.
  - The Montreal Expos obtain center-fielder Boots Day from the St. Louis Cardinals for southpaw Rich Nye.
  - Well-traveled left-hander George Brunet packs his bags again when the Seattle Pilots trade him to the Washington Senators for righty reliever Dave Baldwin. Brunet's 30-year Organized Baseball career will include service with 35 teams, including nine MLB clubs.
- December 5
  - The New York Yankees trade left-handed hurler Al Downing and catcher Frank Fernández to the Oakland Athletics for infielders Danny Cater and Ossie Chavarría.
  - The Athletics also purchase the contract of Mudcat Grant from the St. Louis Cardinals. Grant, 34, is in the process of converting from a successful starting pitcher to an effective reliever.
  - The San Diego Padres trade right-hander Frank Reberger to the San Francisco Giants for pitcher Ron Herbel, catcher Bob Barton and third baseman Bobby Etheridge.
  - Five players change teams when the Cleveland Indians send hurlers Ron Law and Horacio Piña, and infielder Dave Nelson, to the Washington Senators for pitchers Dennis Higgins and Barry Moore.
- December 6 – The MLB Restructuring Committee issues its recommendations, which include strengthening the office of the Commissioner of Baseball, reducing the power of the league presidents, adopting interleague play, combining the umpire staffs of each circuit, and standardizing league rules to make them consistent. It will take decades for each recommendation to be implemented, and MLB rules will not be made consistent until 2023, when the National League adopts the designated hitter rule, which debuted in the American League in 1973.
- December 7 – The Seattle Pilots send pitcher Diego Segui and shortstop Ray Oyler to the Oakland Athletics for right-hander George Lauzerique and infielder Ted Kubiak.
- December 10 – The Minnesota Twins deal former 20-game-winner and 1964 Cy Young Award recipient Dean Chance, fellow right-hander Bob Miller, third baseman Graig Nettles and outfielder Ted Uhlaender to the Cleveland Indians for former 20-game-winner and 1968 earned run average leader Luis Tiant and another pitcher, Stan Williams.
- December 12
  - The New York Mets send infielder Bob Heise and outfielder Jim Gosger to the San Francisco Giants for pitcher Ray Sadecki and outfielder Dave Marshall.
  - The Giants also send right-hander Bob Bolin to the Seattle Pilots for outfielders Dick Simpson and Steve Whitaker.
- December 13 – The Boston Red Sox acquire veteran left-hander Gary Peters, a 2x earned run average champion and 2x American League All-Star, and catcher Don Pavletich from the Chicago White Sox for infielder Syd O'Brien and pitcher Gerry Janeski ("PTBNL").
- December 30 – Johnny Murphy, recently crowned winner of the 1969 Sporting News Executive of the Year Award and general manager of the reigning world champion New York Mets, is hospitalized after suffering a heart attack. He dies on January 14, 1970.

== Births ==
=== January–March ===
- January 1 – Roberto Rivera
- January 3 – Cris Colón
- January 6 – Alvin Morman
- January 7 – Chris Hatcher
- January 8 – Brian Boehringer
- January 9 – Domingo Jean
- January 10 – Takahito Nomura
- January 11 – Manny Acta
- January 13
  - Kevin Foster
  - Orlando Miller
- January 15 – Delino DeShields
- January 16 – Kevin McGehee
- January 19 – Orlando Palmeiro
- January 21 – Rusty Greer
- January 22 – Keith Gordon
- January 27 – Phil Plantier

=== February ===
- February 3 – Terry Bradshaw
- February 4 – Brad Cornett
- February 5 – David Holdridge
- February 6 – Bob Wickman
- February 10 – Jayhawk Owens
- February 11
  - Bryan Eversgerd
  - Kevin King
- February 13 – Mike Mimbs
- February 14 – Craig Bjornson
- February 15 – Brian Williams
- February 16 – Tim Costo
- February 23 – Frank Charles
- February 25
  - Huck Flener
  - Les Forman
- February 27 – Willie Banks

=== March ===
- March 1 – Doug Creek
- March 4
  - Ed Giovanola
  - Lee Tinsley
- March 14 – Jalal Leach
- March 17 – Scott Brow
- March 23 – Chris Turner
- March 25
  - Travis Fryman
  - Eric Helfand
  - Paul Menhart
  - Scott Sanders
  - Erik Schullstrom
  - Dan Wilson
- March 28 – Craig Paquette
- March 30 – Chris Gardner

=== April ===
- April 1 – Frank Castillo
- April 2 – Steve Hosey
- April 4
  - Carlos Reyes
  - Mark Strittmatter
- April 6 – Bret Boone
- April 7 – Ricky Bones
- April 8
  - Kirk Dressendorfer
  - Pete Walker
- April 14
  - Brad Ausmus
  - Brad Pennington
- April 15 – Jeromy Burnitz
- April 16
  - Ken Takahashi
  - Fernando Viña
- April 17 – Jeff Ball
- April 18 – Angelo Encarnación
- April 20 – Dan Smith
- April 22 – George Williams
- April 26 – Ricky Trlicek
- April 28 – Jimmy Myers

=== May ===
- May 1 – Phil Hiatt
- May 3 – Dan Iassogna
- May 5 – John Mallee
- May 9 – Desi Wilson
- May 10
  - John Cummings
  - Pete Schourek
- May 13 – Lyle Mouton
- May 15 – Hideki Irabu
- May 16 – Mike Heathcott
- May 17 – Rick Huisman
- May 18 – Kerry Woodson
- May 19 – Phil Leftwich
- May 22 – Vaughn Eshelman
- May 23 – Ramón Caraballo
- May 24 – Rob Drake
- May 26 – John O'Donoghue
- May 27 – Todd Hundley
- May 28 – Mike DiFelice
- May 29 – Toby Borland
- May 31
  - Rikkert Faneyte
  - Tim Van Egmond

=== June ===
- June 2 – Kurt Abbott
- June 4 – Robert Pérez
- June 7 – Jeff Pierce
- June 10 – Kevin Flora
- June 11 – Brian Koelling
- June 16 – Kevin Young
- June 21 – Donovan Osborne
- June 25 – Brad Woodall
- June 26
  - Mike Myers
  - Rodney Myers
- June 28 – Todd Revenig
- June 29
  - José Alberro
  - George Glinatsis
  - Pablo Martínez

=== July ===
- July 2 – So Taguchi
- July 6 – Jeff Darwin
- July 8
  - Bobby Ayala
  - Rosario Rodríguez
  - Ernie Young
- July 10 – Marty Cordova
- July 11 – Mark Carlson
- July 14 – José Hernández
- July 21 – Denny Harriger
- July 23
  - Francisco Matos
  - Henry Mercedes
- July 24 – Jim Wolf
- July 26 – Greg Colbrunn
- July 29 – Mike Williams

=== August ===
- August 1
  - Kevin Jarvis
  - Brent Knackert
- August 2 – Dae-Sung Koo
- August 3 – Steve Dixon
- August 4 – Troy O'Leary
- August 5 – Marcos Armas
- August 6 – Keith Mitchell
- August 7
  - Brian Kowitz
  - Stan Spencer
- August 8 – Ray Montgomery
- August 9 – Troy Percival
- August 13 – Alex Fernández
- August 19
  - Matt Franco
  - Miguel Jimenez
- August 20 – Mark Holzemer
- August 21 – Andújar Cedeño
- August 22 – Hipólito Pichardo
- August 26
  - Ricky Bottalico
  - Ken Grundt
- August 31 – Nate Minchey

=== September ===
- September 2 – Mike Thomas
- September 3 – Tom Thobe
- September 7
  - Darren Bragg
  - Brent Cookson
  - Rafael Quirico
- September 11
  - Shannon Penn
  - Eduardo Pérez
- September 12 – Hilly Hathaway
- September 13 – Russ Davis
- September 14 – Mike Durant
- September 15 – Herbert Perry
- September 19 – Marc Ronan
- September 21
  - Jason Christiansen
  - Ben Shelton
- September 22
  - Jeff Barry
  - César Devarez
- September 23 – Jeff Cirillo
- September 25
  - Oscar Múñoz
  - David Weathers
  - Tony Womack
- September 26 – Brian Looney

=== October ===
- October 2
  - Alan Newman
  - Matt Walbeck
- October 6 – Robert Person
- October 9 – Kevin Jordan
- October 11 – Larry Luebbers
- October 12
  - José Valentín
  - Derrick White
- October 13
  - Tim Crabtree
  - Damian Miller
- October 14 – Héctor Ortiz
- October 16 – Matt Ruebel
- October 17 – Chris Tremie
- October 18 – Jeff McNeely
- October 19 – Lance Dickson
- October 20 – Juan González
- October 21 – Chuck Smith
- October 22
  - Héctor Carrasco
  - Ariel Prieto
- October 24 – Arthur Rhodes
- October 25
  - Keith Garagozzo
  - Larry Thomas
- October 26 – Mark Sweeney
- October 28 – Kirk Bullinger
- October 31
  - Oreste Marrero
  - Damon Mashore

=== November ===
- November 3 – Kenny Robinson
- November 6 – Don Wengert
- November 7 – Dave Fleming
- November 8 – Shane Halter
- November 9 – Ángel Miranda
- November 11 – Damion Easley
- November 13 – Rigo Beltrán
- November 16 – Pete Rose (Jr.)
- November 17 – Ben Weber
- November 19 – Steve Dreyer
- November 21 – Ken Griffey Jr.
- November 23
  - Doug Brady
  - David McCarty
- November 26 – Sam Militello
- November 27
  - Chris Eddy
  - Tim Laker
- November 28 – Robb Nen
- November 29 – Mariano Rivera
- November 30 – Mark Lewis

=== December ===
- December 2 – Steve Sisco
- December 3 – Kevin Morgan
- December 9
  - Mike Fyhrie
  - Ramón García
- December 10
  - Pat Ahearne
  - Jon Zuber
- December 13 – Doug Saunders
- December 14
  - Scott Hatteberg
  - Dave Nilsson
- December 16 – Jason Wood
- December 17 – Rudy Pemberton
- December 18 – Joe Randa
- December 29 – Scott Ruffcorn
- December 30 – Steve Gajkowski

== Deaths ==
=== January ===
- January 5
  - Tiny Osborne, 75, 6 ft 4 in (1.93 m), 215 lb (98 kg) pitcher who worked in 142 games for the Chicago Cubs (1922–1924) and Brooklyn Robins (1924–1925); father of Bobo Osborne.
  - Larry Pratt, 81, catcher for Boston (American League) in 1914, then Brooklyn and Newark (both of the "outlaw" Federal League) in 1915.
- January 6
  - Larry Cheney, 82, three-time 20-game winning pitcher for the Chicago Cubs (1911–1915), Brooklyn Robins (1915–1919), Boston Braves (1919) and Philadelphia Phillies (1919); led National League hurlers with 26 victories in 1912.
  - Hank Olmsted, 89, pitcher for the 1905 Boston Americans.
  - Clint Rogge, 79, pitcher who as a rookie won 17 games for the 1915 Pittsburgh Rebels of the Federal League; later, hurled in six contests for 1921 Cincinnati Reds.
  - Jim Viox, 78, Pittsburgh Pirates second baseman who played in 506 games from 1912 to 1916.
- January 7 – Bill Lobe, 56, minor-league catcher who spent nine years (1951–1959) as bullpen coach of the Cleveland Indians.
- January 18 – Ray Kennedy, 73, second baseman turned executive and scout; general manager of Pittsburgh Pirates (1946), farm system director of Pirates (1947–1948) and Detroit Tigers (1949–1951), and player personnel director of Kansas City Athletics (1955); appeared in one MLB game as a player for the St. Louis Browns (1916).
- January 21 – Dick Terwilliger, 62, pitcher who threw three scoreless innings of relief in his lone MLB appearance on August 18, 1932, as a member of the St. Louis Cardinals.
- January 23 – Al Bridwell, 85, shortstop whose apparent game-winning single for the New York Giants in a 1908 contest led to the controversial play in which baserunner Fred Merkle was eventually called out for not touching second base.
- January 27 – Al Schweitzer, 86, reserve outfielder for 1908–1911 St. Louis Browns.
- January 29 – Dolly King, 55, star Long Island University athlete and outfielder for the Homestead Grays and New York Black Yankees of the Negro National League in 1944; also played professional basketball.
- January 30 – Sam Bennett, 84, catcher/outfielder for Dayton and St. Louis of the Negro National League over five seasons spanning 1920 to 1925.

=== February ===
- February 1 – Razor Ledbetter, 74, pitcher who threw a scoreless inning of relief in his lone MLB appearance as a Detroit Tiger on April 16, 1915.
- February 2 – Ray Schmandt, 73, backup first- and second baseman for 1915 St. Louis Browns and 1918–1922 Brooklyn Robins; appeared in 1920 World Series.
- February 5 – Hack Spencer, 83, St. Louis Browns pitcher who worked in one game on April 18, 1912.
- February 13 – Shags Horan, 73, reserve outfielder who appeared in 22 games for 1924 New York Yankees.
- February 16 – Mul Holland, 66, pitcher who had trials with three National League clubs during three seasons spanning 1926 to 1929.
- February 18 – Jack Zeller, 85, executive and scout; general manager of the Detroit Tigers from 1938 to 1945; later, director of scouting of the Boston Braves.
- February 19 – Doc White, 89, Chicago White Sox pitcher (1903–1913) whose record of five consecutive shutouts (September 12–30, 1904) was broken by Don Drysdale in 1968; led 1906 American League in ERA (1.52) and a member of the World Series champion "Hitless Wonders", going 1–1 in the 1906 World Series against the crosstown Cubs; won 27 games, tops in the AL, in 1907.
- February 23
  - Bubbles Hargrave, 76, catcher who hit .310 lifetime in 852 career games for the Chicago Cubs (1913–1915), Cincinnati Reds (1921–1928) and New York Yankees (1930); National League batting champion (.353) in 1926, first catcher to win a batting title in post-1901 era.
  - Bill Swift, 60, pitcher who posted a 95–82 (3.58) record in 336 MLB games for four clubs, principally the Pittsburgh Pirates, between 1932 and 1943.
- February 25 – Russ Wrightstone, 75, versatile infielder/outfielder (primarily a third- and first baseman) who appeared in 929 games for 1920–1928 Philadelphia Phillies and 1928 New York Giants.

=== March ===
- March 10 – Max Rosenfeld, 66, outfielder who got into 42 games with Brooklyn of the National League between 1931 and 1933.
- March 12 – Joe Engel, 76, left-handed pitcher who appeared in 102 MLB games, 99 of them for the Washington Senators, between 1912 and 1920, then longtime Washington scout and operator of the Chattanooga Lookouts, the Senators' top farm team; namesake of Engel Stadium.
- March 14 – Heinie Zimmerman, 82, third baseman who played 1,456 games for Chicago Cubs (1907–1916) and New York Giants (1916–1919) who won the NL triple crown in 1912; barred from baseball in 1919 for his role in fixing games.
- March 16
  - William Bell, 71, All-Star pitcher of the Negro leagues who posted the highest career winning percentage (114–52, .687) in Black baseball; managed Newark of Negro National League over three separate one-year terms (1936, 1938, 1948).
  - Néstor Chávez, 21, pitcher who played for the 1967 San Francisco Giants.
  - Andy Rush, 79, pitcher who made four appearances for 1925 Brooklyn Robins.
- March 17
  - Jim Mains, 46, native of Maine who pitched in one game for the wartime Philadelphia Athletics on August 22, 1943.
  - Poindexter Williams, 71, catcher who played for six teams in the Negro National League, primarily the Birmingham Black Barons, between 1921 and 1933; also managed Birmingham and Louisville of the NNL.
- March 18
  - Rafael Almeida, 81, Cuban third baseman who played in 102 games for the 1911–1913 Cincinnati Reds; one of first three Cuban-born players in MLB during its post-1901 era.
  - Jack Bradley, 75, who appeared in two games as a catcher and pinch hitter for the 1916 Cleveland Indians.
- March 19
  - Josh Swindell, 83, pitcher who twirled in four games for the 1911 Cleveland Naps.
  - Lonnie Torian, 73, pitcher for the 1920 St. Louis Giants of the Negro National League.
- March 20 – Jim Clark, 81, outfielder who played 16 games for 1911–1912 St. Louis Cardinals.
- March 21
  - Everett Booe, 77, outfielder who appeared in 125 games for Pittsburgh of the National League (1913) and Indianapolis and Buffalo of the Federal League (1914).
  - Pinky Higgins, 59, third baseman for the Philadelphia Athletics, Boston Red Sox and Detroit Tigers for 14 years between 1930 and 1946; held American League record for career games at that position; three-time All-Star; later manager (1955–1959 and 1960–1962) and general manager (1963–1965) of the Red Sox.
- March 22 – Floyd Speer, 56, relief pitcher who worked in a total of three games for the wartime 1943–1944 Chicago White Sox.
- March 23 – Oris Hockett, 59, outfielder for 1938–1939 Brooklyn Dodgers and 1941–1945 Cleveland Indians, appearing in 551 career games; 1944 American League All-Star.

=== April ===
- April 2
  - Ben Cardoni, 48, pitcher who was winless in six decisions and 36 career games for the 1943–1945 Boston Braves.
  - Bill Force, 73, pitcher who appeared in 186 games between 1921 and 1929 for the Detroit Stars and Baltimore Black Sox of the Negro leagues.
- April 3 – Charley Stanceu, 53, pitcher who worked in 39 career games for the New York Yankees (1941 and 1946) and Philadelphia Phillies (1946).
- April 4
  - Les Wilson, 83, outfielder who played for the 1911 Boston Red Sox.
  - Chuck Ward, 74, shortstop for 1917 Pittsburgh Pirates and utility infielder for 1918–1922 Brooklyn Robins.
- April 7 – Si Rosenthal, 65, outfielder who played for the Red Sox from 1925 to 1926.
- April 8 – Win Noyes, 79, pitcher in 49 MLB games for the Boston Braves (1913), Philadelphia Athletics (1917, 1919) and Chicago White Sox (1919).
- April 9 – Frank Scanlan, 78, Philadelphia Phillies southpaw and former Notre Dame baseball player, who pitched in six MLB games during August and September 1909; brother of Doc Scanlan.
- April 10 – Scotty Robb, 60, one of few mid-century umpires employed by both major leagues; worked in 662 National League games and two All-Star games between August 28, 1947 and May 4, 1952, when he resigned; then joined American League arbiter crew and officiated in 207 contests from May 13, 1952 to June 28, 1953.
- April 11 – Al Kaiser, 82, outfielder in 155 games for Chicago and Boston of the National League (1911–1912) and Indianapolis of the Federal League (1914).
- April 13 – William Walsingham Jr., 59, front-office executive; vice president of St. Louis Cardinals (1942–1955) and executive VP of Baltimore Orioles (1957–1958).
- April 19
  - Harry Cassady, 88, outfielder who played briefly for the 1904 Pittsburgh Pirates and 1905 Washington Senators.
  - Bob "Rip" Collins, 59, catcher who appeared in 50 career games for the Chicago Cubs (1940) and New York Yankees (1944).
- April 21 – Clarence Palm, 61, catcher in the Negro leagues whose career spanned 1927 to 1946; member of champion 1928 St. Louis Stars.
- April 23 – Freddie Moncewicz, 65, backup shortstop for the 1928 Boston Red Sox.
- April 27 – Harry Taylor, 61, first baseman who played 10 games with the 1932 Chicago Cubs.
- April 28 – Joe Burg, 86, third baseman/shortstop who appeared in 13 late-season games for the 1910 Boston Doves of the National League.
- April 29 – Ed Monroe, 74, pitcher who made ten appearances for the 1917–1918 New York Yankees.
- April 30 – Colonel Snover, 73, left-hander who pitched in two games for New York Giants in September 1919.

=== May ===
- May 1 – Gary Wilson, 90, second baseman for the 1902 Boston Americans.
- May 2 – Steve Larkin, 58, pitcher who appeared in two games during May 1934 for the Detroit Tigers.
- May 5 – Eddie Cicotte, 84, pitcher who won 208 games for the Tigers, Red Sox and White Sox, but was thrown out of baseball as one of the eight "Black Sox" involved in fixing the 1919 World Series; he was the first of the eight to come forward, confessing his involvement and testifying before the grand jury.
- May 7 – Ray Mack, 52, light-hitting second baseman for Cleveland Indians, New York Yankees and Chicago Cubs who played in 791 games from 1938 to 1944 and 1946–1947.
- May 15 – Frank "Shag" Shaughnessy, 86, U.S.-born outfielder and Notre Dame graduate who played in nine American League games for Washington (1905) and Philadelphia (1908) and coached for the 1928 Detroit Tigers; pivotal figure in both the U.S. and Canada in minor league baseball (manager between 1909 and 1936, inventor of the "Shaughnessy playoffs" in 1936, and president of the International League from 1936 to 1960); also an influential gridiron football coach, and general manager of hockey's original Ottawa Senators; posthumously elected in 1983 to Canadian Baseball Hall of Fame.
- May 17 – Pants Rowland, 91, manager of the 1917 World Series champion Chicago White Sox, later president of the Pacific Coast League from 1944 to 1954, then longtime vice president of Chicago Cubs.
- May 19 – Jim Tobin, 56, good-hitting knuckleball pitcher who hurled in 287 career games for the Pittsburgh Pirates, Boston Bees/Braves, and Detroit Tigers between 1937 and 1945; threw no-hitter against Brooklyn on April 27, 1944; batted .230 with 17 homers and 102 RBI in 796 career at bats; hit three homers in a game for Boston on May 13, 1942, and made 109 career appearances as a pinch hitter in addition to his mound duties.
- May 20
  - Lee Allen, 54, historian at the Baseball Hall of Fame since 1959, former sportswriter.
  - Charlie Pickett, 86, pitcher who worked in two games for the St. Louis Cardinals in June 1910.
- May 21 – Dennis Burns, 70, pitcher who worked in 41 games for the 1923–1924 Philadelphia Athletics.
- May 25 – Jim Riley, 74, Canadian infielder who played in six total MLB games for the St. Louis Browns (1921) and Washington Senators (1923); the only athlete in sports history to play both Major League Baseball and in the National Hockey League.
- May 26 – Harland Rowe, 73, third baseman who played 17 games for 1916 Philadelphia Athletics.
- May 27 – Lou Jackson, 33, outfielder who played 34 total games for the 1958–1959 Chicago Cubs and 1964 Baltimore Orioles; achieved success in Nippon Professional Baseball, smashing 68 home runs over three seasons (1966–1968).
- May 28 – Gus Getz, 79, infielder for five big league clubs, principally Boston and Brooklyn of the National League, over seven seasons between 1909 and 1918.

=== June ===
- June 3 – Cobe Jones, 61, shortstop who got into 26 games for the 1929–1930 Pittsburgh Pirates; later, a scout.
- June 10 – Charlie Fuchs, 55, World War II-era pitcher who hurled in 47 games for the Detroit Tigers, Philadelphia Phillies, St. Louis Browns and Brooklyn Dodgers between 1941 and 1944.
- June 17 – Byron Houck, 77, pitched in 118 major league games; as a member of 1912–1913 Philadelphia Athletics, he went 14–6 for the 1913 World Series champs, then jumped to the "outlaw" Federal League, where he hurled for the 1914 Brooklyn Tip-Tops; returned to the American League in 1918 as a St. Louis Brown.
- June 24 – John Perrin, 71, right fielder for 1921 Boston Red Sox; later a fullback/quarterback for the NFL Hartford Blues.
- June 28 – Sammy Gee, 41, shortstop who appeared in 13 games for the 1948 New York Cubans of the Negro National League.
- June 29 – Ted McGrew, 89, minor league player and manager, National League umpire (1930–1931, 1933–1934), then a longtime scout for numerous MLB teams.
- June 30 – Milt Gray, 55, catcher who appeared in two May 1937 games for the Washington Senators.

=== July ===
- July 2
  - Art Scharein, 64, infielder who played 205 games for the 1932–1934 St. Louis Browns.
  - Clarence Woods, 77, pitcher for the 1914 Indianapolis Hoosiers of the Federal League.
- July 3
  - Hunky Shaw, 84, minor league third baseman/outfielder who went hitless in his only MLB at bat as a pinch hitter for the Pittsburgh Pirates on May 16, 1908.
  - Harry Spratt, 80, infielder for Boston (National League) in 1911 and 1912.
- July 4 – Lew Drill, 92, catcher/outfielder for Washington, Baltimore and Detroit of the American League (1902–1905), appearing in 293 games.
- July 5 – Ed Hemingway, 76, reserve second- and third baseman for the 1914 St. Louis Browns, 1917 New York Giants and 1918 Philadelphia Phillies.
- July 8
  - Bill Carrigan, nicknamed "Rough", 85, player-manager (1913–1916) and backup catcher (1906, 1908–1916) for the Boston Red Sox' world champions in 1912, 1915 and 1916; later returned as pilot of terrible Red Sox teams between 1927 and 1929.
  - Red Rolfe, 60, third baseman for New York Yankees (1931 and 1934–1942), and member of five World Series champions; three-time AL All-Star; manager of Detroit Tigers from 1949 to July 4, 1952; the Dartmouth College alumnus was also an Ivy League baseball coach (Yale) and athletics director (Dartmouth).
- July 13 – Pat French, 75, outfielder and pinch hitter in three games for the 1917 Philadelphia Athletics.
- July 16 – Doc Waldbauer, 77, pitcher who worked in two games for the Washington Senators in September 1917.
- July 19
  - Otto Vogel, 69, outfielder who appeared in 111 games for 1923–1924 Chicago Cubs.
  - Al Williams, 55, pitcher who appeared in 46 total games for 1937–1938 Philadelphia Athletics.
- July 23 – Roy Mahaffey, 65, pitcher in 224 games—197 for the Athletics—for three MLB clubs over nine seasons between 1926 and 1936; member of Philadelphia's 1930 World Series champions.
- July 27 – Glenn Elliott, 49, southpaw reliever who pitched in 34 games for the 1947–1949 Boston Braves; scout for the Philadelphia Phillies from 1960 until his death.
- July 29 – Douglas Sydnor, 49, World War II-era outfielder who appeared in 13 Negro National League games in 1943 and 1944.
- July 30 – Flint Rhem, 68, pitcher who won 20 games (losing 7) for the 1926 world champion St. Louis Cardinals and went 105–97 over 12 National League seasons (1924–1928 and 1930–1936) with Cardinals, Boston Braves and Philadelphia Phillies.

=== August ===
- August 5
  - Ralph Caldwell, 85, southpaw who pitched in 13 career games for the 1904–1905 Philadelphia Phillies.
  - Verdo Elmore, 69, outfielder who played in seven games for the 1924 St. Louis Browns.
- August 9 – Glenn Myatt, 72, lefty-swinging catcher who appeared in 1,004 games between 1920 and 1936 for four MLB clubs, principally the Cleveland Indians.
- August 11 – William Marriott, 75, third baseman who played in 265 total games for the Chicago Cubs (1917, 1920–1921), Boston Braves (1925) and Brooklyn Robins (1926–1927).
- August 15 – Howie Williamson, 64, minor-league outfielder who made ten pinch hitting appearances for 1928 St. Louis Cardinals.
- August 17 – Frank Shellenback, 70, spitball pitcher who played for 1918–1919 Chicago White Sox and won 295 games in the Pacific Coast League; as a minor-league manager, he signed teenager Ted Williams to his first pro contract; later a longtime pitching coach.
- August 19
  - Álejandro Carrasquel, 57, Venezuelan pitcher who posted a 50–39 (3.73) record in 258 games for the Washington Senators (1939–1945) and Chicago White Sox (1949); uncle of Alfonso "Chico" Carrasquel.
  - John Hollison, 99, southpaw who pitched in one game for the Chicago Colts of the National League on August 13, 1892.
- August 30
  - Stew Bolen, 66, left-hander who went 3–13 (6.09 ERA) in 41 career games with the 1926–1927 St. Louis Browns and 1931–1932 Philadelphia Phillies.
  - Tim McKeithan, 62, pitcher who worked in a total of ten games over parts of three seasons (1932–1934) with Philadelphia Athletics.

=== September ===
- September 2 – Jim West, 64, three-time All-Star first baseman for seven clubs (primarily the Baltimore Elite Giants, Philadelphia Stars and Birmingham Black Barons) representing three different Negro leagues between 1930 and 1948.
- September 3 – Bill Culp, 82, who pitched in four games for the 1910 Philadelphia Phillies.
- September 5 – Harry O'Neill, 72, Canadian pitcher who appeared in four MLB games for the 1922–1923 Philadelphia Athletics.
- September 10 – Billy Barbeau, 87, third baseman who played 199 MLB games for the 1905–1906 Cleveland Naps, 1909 Pittsburgh Pirates and 1909–1910 St. Louis Cardinals.
- September 11 – Dick Carter, 53, third-base coach of the Philadelphia Phillies from 1959 to May 30, 1960; previously, scouted for Phils and played and managed in their farm system.
- September 12 – Ed Schorr, 77, pitcher for the 1915 Chicago Cubs.
- September 14 – Jackie Tavener, 71, shortstop who played all or parts of six seasons between 1921 and 1929 for the Detroit Tigers and Cleveland Indians.
- September 18 – Joe Grace, 55, outfielder who appeared in 484 games over six seasons between 1938 and 1947 with the St. Louis Browns and Washington Senators.
- September 28 – Norm McMillan, 73, infielder for four MLB clubs in six seasons spanning 1922 to 1929; most notably, the regular third baseman for pennant-winning 1929 Chicago Cubs; started all five games of 1929 World Series, going two for 20 with two walks.
- September 29 – Tommy Leach, 91, third baseman and center fielder, primarily for the Pittsburgh Pirates, who led the NL in runs twice and home runs once.
- September 30
  - Jim Galvin, 62, minor league catcher who played briefly for the 1930 Boston Red Sox, seeing action in two pinch-hitting assignments; later, a police detective in Atlanta, Georgia.
  - Hank Thompson, 43, third baseman who was the third black player in MLB history as a member of the 1947 St. Louis Browns; in 1949, he and Monte Irvin broke the New York Giants' color line; member of Giants' 1954 World Series champions.

=== October ===
- October 2
  - Gordon Cobbledick, 70, sportswriter for the Cleveland Plain Dealer from 1928 to 1964.
  - Danny O'Connell, 42, infielder who played for the Pittsburgh Pirates, Milwaukee Braves, New York/San Francisco Giants and Washington Senators across ten MLB seasons from 1950 to 1962.
- October 6
  - Desmond Beatty, 76, shortstop/third baseman in two games for the 1914 New York Giants.
  - Roy Crumpler, 73, left-handed pitcher who appeared in five career games for the 1920 Detroit Tigers and 1925 Philadelphia Phillies.
- October 8 – Willie "The Knuck" Ramsdell, 53, knuckleballer who pitched in 111 career games for Brooklyn Dodgers (1947–1948, 1950), Cincinnati Reds (1950–1951) and Chicago Cubs (1952); led National League in games lost (17) in 1951.
- October 9
  - Don Hoak, 41, fiery third baseman on 1955 Brooklyn Dodgers and 1960 Pittsburgh Pirates World Series championship teams; played 11 seasons in National League for five clubs; selected to 1957 NL All-Star team; managed Triple-A Columbus Jets during 1969 season.
  - Ray Lucas, 61, pitcher who worked in 22 total games for the 1929–1931 New York Giants and 1933–1934 Brooklyn Dodgers.
- October 13 – Harry Huston, 85, catcher in two games for the 1906 Philadelphia Phillies; University of Kansas alumnus who, at age 21, served as head football coach of Southwestern College, also in Kansas.
- October 16 – Larry Boerner, 64, pitcher who posted an 0–4 (5.02) record in 21 games for the 1932 Boston Red Sox.
- October 21 – Ray Richmond, 73, St. Louis Browns pitcher who appeared in eight total games in 1920–1921.
- October 23 – Monk Dubiel, 51, pitcher who appeared in 187 career games for 1944–1945 New York Yankees, 1948 Philadelphia Phillies and 1949–1952 Chicago Cubs.
- October 24 – Jack Bentley, 74, left-handed pitcher and first baseman who posted a 46–33 (4.01) record on the mound and a .291 batting average in 584 at bats at the plate for the Washington Senators (1913–1916), New York Giants (1923–1926 and 1927), and Philadelphia Phillies (1926); in 1923, he batted .427 (38 for 89 in 52 games, including batting .476 in 22 plate appearances as a pinch hitter) and went 13–8 (4.48) for NL champion Giants; had a brilliant minor-league career with Baltimore Orioles (1919–1922).
- October 26 – Jim Blackburn, 45, World War II combat veteran and Prisoner of War who pitched for postwar Cincinnati Reds, making 18 career appearances during the 1948 and 1951 seasons.
- October 27 – Charlie Jamieson, 76, standout outfielder for Cleveland Indians (1919–1932) and two other AL cubs; batted .303 lifetime in 1,779 games, eclipsing .300 mark ten times and leading Junior Circuit in hits (222) in 1923; member of Cleveland's 1920 World Series champions.
- October 28
  - Dave Callahan, 81, outfielder who played 19 MLB games for the 1910–1911 Cleveland Naps; stole 445 bases during his 17-year career in minor leagues.
  - Joe Rullo, 53, second baseman who appeared in 51 total MLB games for wartime 1943–1944 Philadelphia Athletics.

=== November ===
- November 1
  - Joe Mellana, 64, third baseman and pinch runner who played in four games for 1927 Philadelphia Athletics.
  - George Winn, 72, pitcher for the Boston Red Sox (1919) and Cleveland Indians (1922–1923).
- November 4 – Charlie King, 56, who pitched for the Pittsburgh Crawfords and Philadelphia Stars of the Negro National League in 1937–1938.
- November 5 – Hardin Barry, 78, who pitched in three contests for the 1912 Philadelphia Athletics.
- November 7 – Chick Galloway, 73, shortstop who played 1,076 games for the 1919–1927 Athletics and 1928 Detroit Tigers.
- November 10
  - Cecil Duff, 72, pitcher who appeared in three games for the 1922 Chicago White Sox.
  - George Foss, 72, pinch hitter and third baseman for the 1921 Washington Senators.
  - Augie Swentor, 69, third baseman who went 0-for-1 as a pinch hitter for the White Sox on September 12, 1922, his only MLB appearance.
- November 11 – Stump Edington, 78, 5 ft 7 in (1.70 m) outfielder who batted .302 in 53 at bats for the 1912 Pittsburgh Pirates in his lone MLB opportunity.
- November 12 – Eddie Hurley, 61, American League umpire from 1947 to 1965; officiated in 2,826 regular-season contests, four World Series and three All-Star games; was behind the plate in St. Louis on August 19, 1951, when Eddie Gaedel came to bat in Bill Veeck's famous stunt; led AL umpires in ejections three times over a 19-year career.
- November 14 – Curt Roberts, 40, first black player in Pittsburgh Pirates history (debuting April 13, 1954); second baseman who played in 171 games over three seasons (1954–1956) with Bucs.
- November 15 – Billy Southworth, 76, Hall of Fame manager who won 1,044 regular-season games as skipper of the St. Louis Cardinals (1929 and 1940–1945) and Boston Braves (1946–1951); captured World Series titles in 1942 and 1944 and National League pennants with St. Louis (1943) and Boston (1948); his .597 career winning percentage is second, all-time, to Joe McCarthy; in his playing days, an outfielder who appeared in 1,192 games in 13 seasons for five teams between 1913 and 1929, and batted .297.
- November 16 – Vin Campbell, 81, outfielder who played 546 games during a career spent with the Chicago Cubs, Pittsburgh Pirates, and two Federal League clubs (Indianapolis and Newark) over six seasons between 1908 and 1915.
- November 20
  - Paddy Baumann, 83, second baseman and third baseman who got into 299 games for the Detroit Tigers and New York Yankees between 1911 and 1917.
  - Elmer Wilson, 74, second baseman for St. Louis (1925) and Dayton (1926) of the Negro National League.
- November 24
  - Phil Gallivan, 62, pitcher who appeared in 54 career games for the Brooklyn Robins (1931) and Chicago White Sox (1932, 1934).
  - Pablo Morales, 64, Venezuelan professional baseball executive for more than three decades, and former owner of the Leones del Caracas club.
- November 26 – Emil Kush, 53, pitcher who won 21 of 33 decisions for the Chicago Cubs (1941–1942 and 1946–1949).
- November 27 – Clem Llewellyn, 74, who pitched one scoreless inning in relief for the New York Yankees on June 18, 1922; University of North Carolina alumnus who became a lawyer and county judge after baseball.
- November 29 – Bun Hayes, 66, pitcher for five Negro leagues clubs, primarily the Baltimore Black Sox, from 1928 to 1930 and 1932–1935.
- November 30
  - Connie Creeden, 54, outfielder whose only MLB appearances came as a pinch hitter in five games for the 1943 Boston Braves.
  - Eddie Eayrs, 79, outfielder/southpaw pitcher and Brown University graduate who played for the Pittsburgh Pirates (1913), Boston Braves (1920–1921) and Brooklyn Robins (1921).
- November – Billy Horne, 53, nicknamed "Little Grumbler", All-Star second baseman and shortstop who played for three Negro leagues clubs between 1938 and 1946.

=== December ===
- December 3 – Roy Wilson, 83, left-hander who pitched in one game for the Chicago White Sox on April 18, 1928.
- December 5 – Joe Rabbitt, 69, outfielder/pinch runner in two contests for the 1922 Cleveland Indians.
- December 7 – Lefty O'Doul, 72, left fielder who batted .349 with 1,140 hits in his 970-game career; won two National League batting titles—1929 (.398) and 1932 (.368)—after converting from pitching; his 254 hits led Senior Circuit in 1929 and is tied (with Bill Terry) for most hits in a season in NL annals; winningest manager in Pacific Coast League history, and earned additional fame as the "father" of professional baseball in Japan.
- December 10
  - Mike Cunningham, 87, pitcher who made five appearances for the 1906 Philadelphia Athletics.
  - Jack Tobin, 77, diminutive — 142 lb (64 kg) — but hard-hitting right fielder who batted .309 and amassed 1,906 hits over a 13-year career (1914–1916 and 1918–1927) spent mostly with St. Louis Browns; led American League in triples (18) in 1921; later a Browns' coach.
- December 11 – Ollie Fuhrman, 83, catcher who hit .333 for the Philadelphia Athletics in 1922.
- December 13 – Jack Kibble, 77, switch-hitting third baseman who appeared in five games for the Cleveland Naps in September 1912.
- December 14 – Johnnie Scroggins, 47, pitcher for the 1947 Kansas City Monarchs of the Negro American League.
- December 23 – Ted Menze, 72, outfielder and pinch hitter in two games for the St. Louis Cardinals in September 1918.
- December 30 – Herman Howard, 59, left-handed pitcher in the Negro leagues from 1937 to 1940 and in 1946.
