= Chris Bushing =

American baseball player (born 1967)

- Pitcher
- Born: November 4, 1967 (age 58); Rockville Centre, New York, U.S.
- Batted: Right Threw: Right

MLB debut
- September 3, 1993, for the Cincinnati Reds

Last MLB appearance
- September 23, 1993, for the Cincinnati Reds

MLB statistics
- Win–loss record: 0–0
- Earned run average: 12.46
- Strikeouts: 3
- Stats at Baseball Reference

Teams
- Cincinnati Reds (1993)

Christopher Shaun Bushing (born November 4, 1967) is an American former Major League Baseball pitcher. He played during one season at the major league level for the Cincinnati Reds. He was signed by the Baltimore Orioles as an amateur free agent in 1986. Bushing played his first professional season with their Rookie league Bluefield Orioles in 1986, and his last with the Texas Rangers' Triple-A Oklahoma City 89ers in 1995.
