= Milt Hill =

American baseball player (born 1965)

- Pitcher
- Born: August 22, 1965 (age 61); Atlanta, Georgia, U.S.
- Batted: Right Threw: Right

MLB debut
- August 1, 1991, for the Cincinnati Reds

Last MLB appearance
- July 16, 1994, for the Seattle Mariners

MLB statistics
- Win–loss record: 5–1
- Earned run average: 5.08
- Strikeouts: 79
- Stats at Baseball Reference

Teams
- Cincinnati Reds (1991–1993); Atlanta Braves (1994); Seattle Mariners (1994)

Milton Giles Hill (born August 22, 1965) is an American former Major League Baseball (MLB) pitcher. He played four seasons at the major league level for the Cincinnati Reds, Atlanta Braves, and Seattle Mariners.

Atlanta selected Hill in the 23rd round of the 1985 MLB draft out of Georgia Perimeter College, but he did not sign. He was drafted by the Reds in the 28th round of the 1987 MLB draft. He played his first professional season with their Class A Cedar Rapids Reds in 1988, leading his minor league teams in saves in 1988, 1989, and 1992. He dealt with a pulled groin in June 1991, then made his MLB debut with the Reds that summer. He said he was promoted after learning to throw a forkball. He made the Reds' 1992 Opening Day roster but was demoted before pitching in a game. He split 1992 and 1993 between the majors and minors before the Reds put him on waivers after the season.

Atlanta, Hill's hometown team, claimed him off waivers on October 5. He made the team's 1994 Opening Day roster then was claimed off waivers by the Mariners on June 6. He pitched in a career-high 25 games and 35 innings pitched in his final MLB season.

Hill played his last professional season with the Baltimore Orioles' Double-A Bowie Baysox in 1996. He worked more as a starting pitcher in his final two seasons in the minors.

After his playing career, Hill was the pitching coach for the Princeton Devil Rays in 1998, then a scout for the Tampa Bay Devil Rays in 2002 and later the Rays through 2024. He helped the Rays sign Josh Lowe, Taj Bradley, and Chandler Simpson.
