= Cobe Jones =

American baseball player (1907–1969)

- Left fielder
- Born: August 21, 1907; Denver, Colorado
- Died: June 3, 1969 (aged 61); Denver, Colorado
- Batted: Both Threw: Right

MLB debut
- September 27, 1928, for the Pittsburgh Pirates

Last MLB appearance
- June 15, 1929, for the Pittsburgh Pirates

MLB statistics
- Batting average: .262
- Home runs: 0
- Runs batted in: 4
- Stats at Baseball Reference

Teams
- Pittsburgh Pirates (1928–1929)

Coburn Dyas "Cobe" Jones (August 21, 1907 – June 3, 1969) was a Major League Baseball player. Jones played for the Pittsburgh Pirates of the National League for two seasons. In 1928, Jones only played in 1 game and went 1–2. In 1929 Jones played in 28 games, batting .254. Jones was born and died in Denver, Colorado.
