= Domingo Jean =

Dominican baseball player (born 1969)

- Pitcher
- Born: January 9, 1969 (age 57); San Pedro de Macorís, Dominican Republic
- Batted: Right Threw: Right

MLB debut
- August 8, 1993, for the New York Yankees

Last MLB appearance
- October 3, 1993, for the New York Yankees

MLB statistics
- Win–loss record: 1-1
- Earned run average: 4.46
- Strikeouts: 20
- Stats at Baseball Reference

Teams
- New York Yankees (1993)

Domingo Jean Luisa (born January 9, 1969) is a Dominican former professional baseball pitcher. He played part of one season in Major League Baseball, pitching in 10 games for the New York Yankees in 1993.

== Professional career ==
=== Chicago White Sox ===
Jean was originally signed by the Chicago White Sox as an amateur free agent in 1989. He began his professional career with the GCL White Sox the following season, and in 1991 pitched for the South Bend White Sox. On January 10, 1992, Jean was traded to the Yankees as part of a package for Steve Sax.

=== New York Yankees ===
Jean was assigned to the Fort Lauderdale Yankees to start the 1992 season. He pitched most of the year there, although at the end of the season he was promoted to the Double-A Albany-Colonie Yankees for one start.

In 1993, Jean split the year between three minor league levels before making his major league debut on August 8. He started that day's game against the Minnesota Twins, pitching 6.2 innings and giving up four runs. Although Jean did not get a decision, the Yankees won the game 8–6. On August 14, the day of his Yankee Stadium debut, Jean was stuck in traffic on the New Jersey side of the George Washington Bridge, so he paid his fare using all the cash he had on hand, left the cab, ran to the New York side, and sought a ride from a stranger living nearby. The stranger drove Jean "close" to the Stadium, and then Jean ran the remaining distance, arriving 45 minutes before the first pitch. He pitched 5 innings and gave up 2 runs in a no decision; the Yankees won the game, 4–2. He earned his lone major league win on August 20 over the Kansas City Royals, pitching 7 innings and giving up just two runs. He finished the season with a record of 1–1 with a 4.46 ERA. Jean was the last active New York Yankee player to wear number 42 before Mariano Rivera donned it in 1995.

After the season, Jean was traded to the Houston Astros along with Andy Stankiewicz for pitcher Xavier Hernandez.

=== Minor league journeyman ===
Jean opened the 1994 season in the minor leagues with the Triple-A Tucson Toros. However, due to injuries, he appeared in just six games. The following year, he started the season with Tucson, but was traded to the Texas Rangers in May. He was assigned to the Oklahoma City 89ers, where he pitched as both a starter and reliever. However, he was just 3–8 with an ERA of 6.14. Late in the season, he was acquired by the Cincinnati Reds organization, where appeared in two games for the Indianapolis Indians.

In 1996, Jean was converted to a full-time reliever. He spent most of the year with the Double-A Chattanooga Lookouts, where he compiled 31 saves in just 39 games. He returned to Chattanooga the following year, but after posting an ERA of 9.75 in 10 games he was let go.

After spending 1998 in the Colorado Rockies organization, Jean signed with the independent Bridgeport Bluefish in 1999. In 2000, he returned to the Yankees' organization, where he spent the next three seasons between the Double-A Norwich Navigators and Triple-A Columbus Clippers. In 2003, Jean pitched his final professional season with the Langosteros de Cancún of the Mexican League.

== Sources ==
- Career statistics from Baseball Reference · Baseball Reference (Minors) · Retrosheet · Baseball Almanac
