= Elmer Wilson =

American baseball player

- Second baseman
- Born: December 31, 1894; St. Louis, Missouri, U.S.
- Died: November 20, 1969 (aged 74); St. Louis, Missouri, U.S.
- Batted: Right Threw: Right

Negro league baseball debut
- 1921, for the Detroit Stars

Last appearance
- 1926, for the Dayton Marcos

Teams
- Detroit Stars (1921); Cleveland Tate Stars (1921); St. Louis Giants (1924); St. Louis Stars (1925); Dayton Marcos (1926)

Elmer Ellsworth Wilson (December 31, 1894 – November 20, 1969) was an American Negro league second baseman in the 1920s.

A native of St. Louis, Missouri, Wilson made his Negro leagues debut in 1921 with the Detroit Stars and the Cleveland Tate Stars. He went on to play for the St. Louis Giants, St. Louis Stars, and Dayton Marcos through 1926, and later managed the Seattle Royal Giants. Wilson died in St. Louis in 1969 at age 74.
