= Viasa Flight 742 =

1969 aviation accident in Venezuela

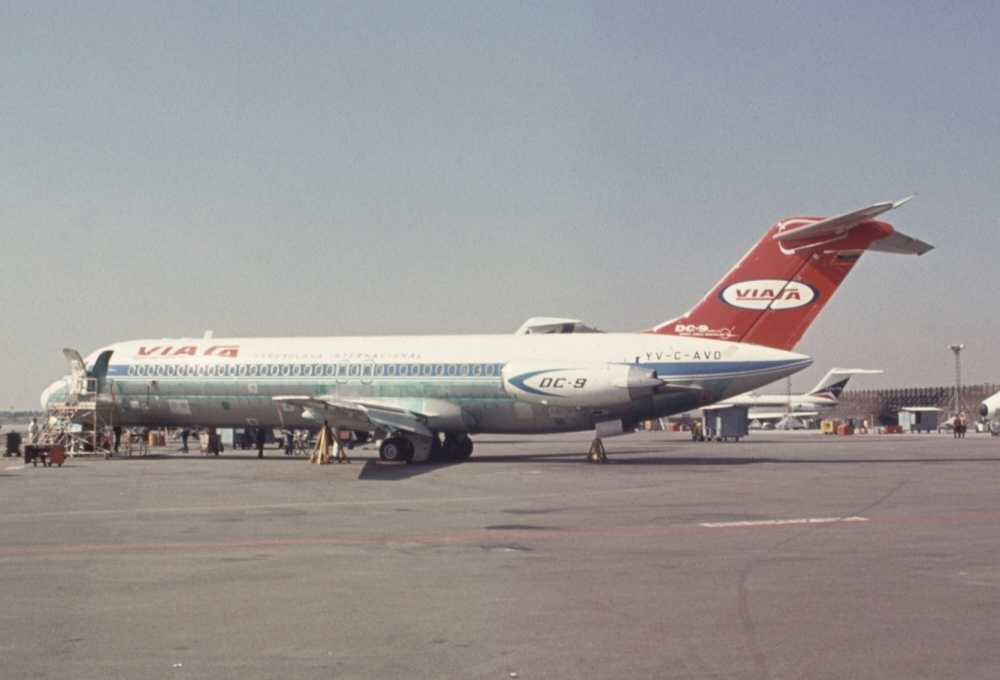
- YV-C-AVD, the aircraft involved in the accident, pictured in February 1969

Accident
- Date: 16 March 1969
- Summary: Loss of control during takeoff due to overloading and faulty sensors
- Site: Grano de Oro Airport, Maracaibo, Venezuela; 10.694°N 71.637°W
- Total fatalities: 155

Aircraft
- Aircraft type: McDonnell Douglas DC-9-32
- Operator: Viasa
- IATA flight No.: VA742
- ICAO flight No.: VIA742
- Call sign: VIASA 742
- Registration: YV-C-AVD
- Flight origin: Simón Bolívar International Airport, Caracas, Venezuela
- Stopover: Grano de Oro Airport, Maracaibo, Venezuela
- Destination: Miami International Airport, Miami, Florida, United States
- Occupants: 84
- Passengers: 74
- Crew: 10
- Fatalities: 84
- Survivors: 0

Ground casualties
- Ground fatalities: 71

Viasa Flight 742 was an international, scheduled passenger flight from Caracas, Venezuela to Miami International Airport, United States with an intermediate stopover in Maracaibo, Venezuela that crashed on 16 March 1969. After taking off on the Maracaibo to Miami leg, the McDonnell Douglas DC-9-32 hit a series of power lines before crashing into the La Trinidad section of Maracaibo. All 84 people on board died, as well as 71 on the ground. The crash was the world's deadliest civil air disaster in the late 1960s.

== Aircraft ==
The aircraft involved, manufactured in 1969, was a McDonnell Douglas DC-9-32, registered YV-C-AVD with MSN 47243, powered by two Pratt & Whitney JT8D-7 engines.

== Accident ==
The first leg of the flight, from Caracas to Maracaibo, carried 57 people; 47 passengers and 10 crew members. The flight crew of the first leg consisted of two captains: Harry Gibson and Emiliano Savelli Maldonado.

The aircraft arrived at Maracaibo at 10:30. Captain Gibson disembarked and Captain Maldonado became the pilot in command of the last leg. The new first officer was Jose Gregorio Rodriguez Silva. 27 more passengers boarded the aircraft, which was loaded with 12,000 kilograms (26,000 lb) of jet fuel.

Flight 742 began its takeoff roll at 12:00. As the DC-9 headed toward the Ziruma district, it failed to gain altitude, and the plane's left engine struck a power pole. As the plane banked left, a reflector struck the fuel tank, spilling fuel. After hitting another power pole, the plane's left wing was ripped off and the left engine exploded into flames. The plane crashed in a small park in La Trinidad. The impact was so hard that the right engine was torn off the plane and impacted a house.

== Notable people ==
Among the passengers who perished in the disaster was San Francisco Giants pitching prospect Néstor Chávez.

== Investigation ==
The cause of the crash was attributed to faulty sensors, along with runway and take-off calculations made from erroneous information, which resulted in the aircraft being overloaded by more than 5,000 pounds for the prevailing conditions. Only two days after the crash, Venezuela's Public Works Minister ascribed runway length as a contributing factor in the disaster.

== Aftermath ==
The crash resulted in the closure of the old Grano de Oro Airport and accelerated the construction of the new La Chinita International Airport. The new airport opened 8 months later in November 1969.

Flight 742 remains the deadliest accident involving a DC-9. It was also the deadliest accident in Venezuela until West Caribbean Airways Flight 708 (operated by a McDonnell Douglas MD-80, the DC-9's successor aircraft) crashed 36 years later in 2005. At the time, the Flight 742 crash was the world's deadliest civil air disaster. The fatality total was surpassed by All Nippon Airways Flight 58, which killed 162 people after colliding with an F-86 fighter jet in 1971.
