= Néstor Chávez =

Venezuelan baseball player (1947-1969)

- Pitcher
- Born: July 6, 1947; Chacao, Venezuela
- Died: March 16, 1969 (aged 21); Maracaibo, Venezuela
- Batted: Right Threw: Right

MLB debut
- September 9, 1967, for the San Francisco Giants

Last MLB appearance
- September 30, 1967, for the San Francisco Giants

MLB statistics
- Win–loss record: 1–0
- Strikeouts: 3
- Earned run average: 0.00
- Stats at Baseball Reference

Teams
- San Francisco Giants (1967)

Néstor Isaías Chávez Silva (July 6, 1947 – March 16, 1969) was a Venezuelan right-handed starting pitcher who played in Major League Baseball for the San Francisco Giants in 1967. Chávez was just 21 when he was killed in one of the worst aircraft tragedies in Venezuelan history, Viasa Flight 742.

== Career ==
Chávez was born on July 6, 1947, in Chacao, Miranda State. He was signed as an amateur free agent in 1964 after producing a 34–3 record at college. Chávez was nicknamed "El Látigo" (whip) in his homeland, both for his stunning and sharp fastball.

Listed at 6 feet (1.83 m), 170 pounds (77 kg), Chávez was one of the best pitching prospects in the Giants farm system. At 19, he was called up to the big club after a combined 47–20 mark in the minors. In two games with the Giants, he compiled a 1–0 record with three strike outs and a 0.00 ERA in five innings. After the season, he had shoulder surgery and was sidelined for more than a year.

Chávez was ready to start his rehabilitation in the minors in 1969. However, on March 16 of that year, Chávez died in one of the worst aircraft tragedies in Venezuelan history after Viasa Flight 742 crashed while taking off from Maracaibo, killing all 84 aboard and 71 on the ground including Chávez. He was 21 years old.

== See also ==
- List of baseball players who died during their careers
- List of Major League Baseball players from Venezuela
