= Hank Olmsted =

American baseball player (1879–1969)

- Pitcher
- Born: January 12, 1879; Sac Bay, Michigan, U.S.
- Died: January 6, 1969 (aged 89); Bradenton, Florida, U.S.
- Batted: Right Threw: Right

MLB debut
- July 15, 1905, for the Boston Americans

Last MLB appearance
- July 26, 1905, for the Boston Americans

MLB statistics
- Win–loss record: 1-2
- Earned run average: 3.24
- Strikeouts: 6
- Stats at Baseball Reference

Teams
- Boston Americans (1905)

Henry Theodore Olmsted (January 12, 1879 – January 6, 1969) was an American starting pitcher in Major League Baseball who played briefly for the Boston Americans during the 1905 season. Listed at 5 ft 8 in (1.73 m), 147 lb., Olmsted batted and threw right-handed. A native of Sac Bay, Michigan, he attended University of Notre Dame and Valparaiso University. He later played for the Denver Grizzlies in the Western League.

Olmsted posted a 1–2 record with a 3.24 ERA in three appearances, including three complete games, six strikeouts, 12 walks, 18 hits allowed, and 25.0 innings of work.

Olmsted died in Bradenton, Florida at age 89.

== See also ==
- 1905 Boston Americans season
