= Miguel Jimenez (baseball) =

American baseball player (born 1969)

- Pitcher
- Born: August 19, 1969 (age 56); New York, New York, U.S.
- Batted: Right Threw: Right

MLB debut
- September 12, 1993, for the Oakland Athletics

Last MLB appearance
- June 4, 1994, for the Oakland Athletics

MLB statistics
- Win–loss record: 2–4
- Earned run average: 5.90
- Strikeouts: 35

CPBL statistics
- Win–loss record: 1–1
- Earned run average: 3.00
- Strikeouts: 16
- Stats at Baseball Reference

Teams
- Oakland Athletics (1993–1994); Uni-President Lions (1999)

Miguel Anthony Jimenez (born August 19, 1969) is an American former Major League Baseball pitcher. Jimenez played for the Oakland Athletics in 1993 and 1994. He batted and threw right-handed.
