= Tim Costo =

American baseball player (born 1969)

- Outfielder / First baseman
- Born: February 16, 1969 (age 57); Melrose Park, Illinois, U.S.
- Batted: Right Threw: Right

MLB debut
- September 18, 1992, for the Cincinnati Reds

Last MLB appearance
- October 3, 1993, for the Cincinnati Reds

MLB statistics
- Batting average: .224
- Home runs: 3
- Runs batted in: 14
- Stats at Baseball Reference

Teams
- Cincinnati Reds (1992–1993)

Timothy Roger Costo (born February 16, 1969) is an American former Major League Baseball player. Mainly a career first baseman, Costo played for the Cincinnati Reds in 1992 and 1993.

Costo was a first-round draft pick (8th overall) in the 1990 MLB draft. He was drafted by the Cleveland Indians. He had a nine-year minor League career, in the farm system for the Indians, Cincinnati Reds, St. Louis Cardinals, and Toronto Blue Jays. He was the first strikeout of Pedro Martinez’ Hall of Fame career.

In 2007, he was inducted into the Iowa Athletics Hall of Fame.

== Early life ==
Costo was born on February 16, 1969, in Melrose Park, IL. He attended the University of Iowa, where he played baseball from 1988 to 1990.

== Personal life ==
He lives in Chattanooga, Tennessee, where he is the head baseball coach at The McCallie School.
