= Keith Gordon (baseball) =

American baseball player (born 1969)

- Left fielder
- Born: Keith Bradley Gordon; January 22, 1969 (age 57); Bethesda, Maryland
- Batted: Right Threw: Right

MLB debut
- July 9, 1993, for the Cincinnati Reds

Last MLB appearance
- July 11, 1993, for the Cincinnati Reds

MLB statistics
- Batting average: .167
- Games played: 3
- Runs scored: 0
- Stats at Baseball Reference

Teams
- Cincinnati Reds (1993)

Keith Bradley Gordon (born January 22, 1969) is an American former professional baseball player. He appeared in three games for the Cincinnati Reds of Major League Baseball (MLB) in its 1993 season.

== Career ==
Born in Bethesda, Maryland, Gordon attended Walter Johnson High School. After that, he graduated from Wright State University, where he played for the Wright State Raiders baseball team. He was drafted by the Cincinnati Reds in the second round of the 1990 amateur draft. His Major League debut came on July 9, 1993, against the Pittsburgh Pirates. He went 1 for 4 in the game.

Besides, Gordon played minor league baseball through the 2002 season. He has since moved back to Clarksburg, Maryland, and currently is the head coach of the Varsity baseball team at the Bullis School in Potomac, Maryland. In addition, he serves as a baseball, basketball, and swimming instructor. Gordon is married and has one child.
