= Lonnie Torian =

American baseball player

- Pitcher
- Born: September 26, 1895; Massac, Kentucky, U.S.
- Died: March 19, 1969 (aged 73); Paducah, Kentucky, U.S.
- Threw: Right

Negro league baseball debut
- 1920, for the St. Louis Giants

Last appearance
- 1920, for the St. Louis Giants

Teams
- St. Louis Giants (1920)

Lonnie Torian (September 26, 1895 – March 19, 1969) was an American Negro league baseball pitcher in the 1920s.

A native of Massac, Kentucky, Torian played for the St. Louis Giants in 1920. He died in Paducah, Kentucky in 1969 at age 73.
