= List of Major League Baseball career strikeouts by batters leaders =

This list is for batters. For career strikeouts by pitchers, see List of Major League Baseball career strikeout leaders.

Reggie Jackson, the all-time leader in strikeouts by a batter

In baseball, a strikeout (or strike-out) occurs when a batter accumulates three strikes during a time at bat. It means the batter is out, unless the third strike is not caught by the catcher and the batter reaches first base safely as a result. A strikeout is a statistic recorded for both pitchers and batters, and is usually denoted by the letter K (or a backwards "Ʞ" if the third strike is not swung at), or sometimes by the initialism SO.

Reggie Jackson holds the record for the most career strikeouts by a batter with 2,597. Jim Thome (2,548), Adam Dunn (2,379), Sammy Sosa (2,306), Alex Rodriguez (2,287), Miguel Cabrera (2,105), Giancarlo Stanton (2,088), Paul Goldschmidt (2,065), and Andrés Galarraga (2,003), are the only other hitters to strike out over 2,000 times.

== Key ==
**Rank**	Rank amongst leaders in career strikeouts. A blank field indicates a tie.
**Player (2026 Ks)**	Number of strikeouts during the 2026 Major League Baseball season.
**K**	Total career strikeouts.
*	Denotes elected to National Baseball Hall of Fame.
**Bold**	Denotes active player. (Note: A player is considered inactive if he has announced his retirement or has not played for a full season.)

== List ==
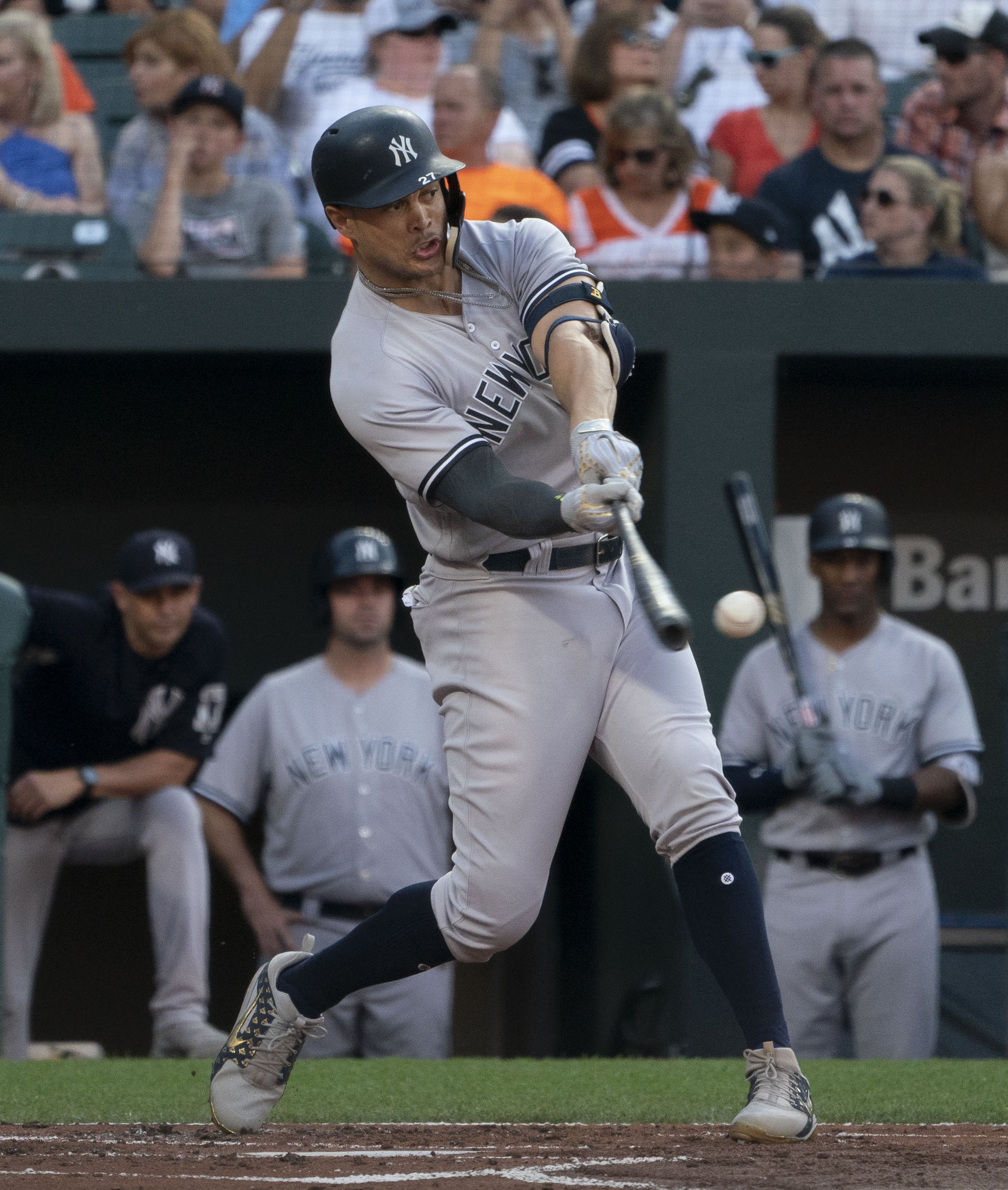
Giancarlo Stanton, the active leader and 7th all-time in strikeouts by a batter.

- Stats updated as of September 27, 2026.

Rank	Player (2026 Ks)	K
1	Reggie Jackson*	2,597
2	Jim Thome*	2,548
3	Adam Dunn	2,379
4	Sammy Sosa	2,306
5	Alex Rodriguez	2,287
6	Miguel Cabrera	2,105
7	**Giancarlo Stanton (29)**	2,088
8	**Paul Goldschmidt (86)**	2,065
9	Andrés Galarraga	2,003
10	**Eugenio Suárez (169)**	1,983
11	Justin Upton	1,971
12	Jose Canseco	1,942
13	Willie Stargell*	1,936
14	Mark Reynolds	1,927
15	Nelson Cruz	1,916
	Curtis Granderson	1,916
17	**Andrew McCutchen (22)**	1,915
18	Mike Cameron	1,901
19	Mike Schmidt*	1,883
20	Fred McGriff*	1,882
21	**Freddie Freeman (116)**	1,879
22	Tony Pérez*	1,867
23	Chris Davis	1,852
24	Ryan Howard	1,843
25	Bobby Abreu	1,840
	Derek Jeter*	1,840
27	**Mike Trout (165)**	1,828
28	Dave Kingman	1,816
29	Manny Ramirez	1,813
30	Alfonso Soriano	1,803
31	**Bryce Harper (148)**	1,802
32	Carlos Beltrán*	1,795
33	Ken Griffey Jr.*	1,779
34	Bobby Bonds	1,757
35	Craig Biggio*	1,753
36	David Ortiz*	1,750
37	Andruw Jones*	1,748
	Dale Murphy	1,748
39	**Kyle Schwarber (220)**	1,747
40	Carlos Delgado	1,745
41	Torii Hunter	1,741
42	Adrián Beltré*	1,732
43	Lou Brock*	1,730
44	Jim Edmonds	1,729
45	J. D. Martinez	1,714
46	Mickey Mantle*	1,710
47	Harmon Killebrew*	1,699
48	Chili Davis	1,698
49	Dwight Evans	1,697
50	Evan Longoria	1,696

Rank	Player (2026 Ks)	K
51	Rickey Henderson*	1,694
52	Dave Winfield*	1,686
53	**Christian Yelich (135)**	1,683
54	**Nick Castellanos (34)**	1,651
55	Matt Kemp	1,641
56	Joey Votto	1,640
57	Derrek Lee	1,622
58	Reggie Sanders	1,614
59	Gary Gaetti	1,602
60	Mark McGwire	1,596
61	Shin-Soo Choo	1,579
62	**Manny Machado (144)**	1,577
	Carlos Peña	1,577
64	Jay Bruce	1,572
	Jason Giambi	1,572
66	Lee May	1,570
	**Marcell Ozuna (80)**	1,570
68	Pat Burrell	1,564
69	Melvin Upton Jr.	1,561
70	Jeff Bagwell*	1,558
71	Dick Allen*	1,556
72	Ray Lankford	1,550
	Willie McCovey*	1,550
74	**Carlos Santana (8)**	1,548
75	Barry Bonds	1,539
76	Dave Parker*	1,537
77	Alex Gordon	1,535
78	Frank Robinson*	1,532
79	Lance Parrish	1,527
80	Willie Mays*	1,526
	Devon White	1,526
82	Jeff Kent*	1,522
83	Eddie Murray*	1,516
84	Rick Monday	1,513
	Greg Vaughn	1,513
86	Andre Dawson*	1,509
87	Tony Phillips	1,499
88	Greg Luzinski	1,495
89	Eddie Mathews*	1,487
90	Iván Rodríguez*	1,474
91	Mike Napoli	1,468
92	Frank Howard	1,460
93	**Aaron Judge (85)**	1,454
94	Jorge Posada	1,453
95	Jhonny Peralta	1,450
	Jayson Werth	1,450
97	**Javier Báez (41)**	1,444
98	Jay Bell	1,443
99	Jack Clark	1,442
	Juan Samuel	1,442
