= 1966 Major League Baseball season =

1966 MLB season
- League: American League (AL); National League (NL)
- Sport: Baseball
- Duration: Regular season: April 11 – October 2, 1966 (AL); April 12 – October 2, 1966 (NL); World Series: October 5–9, 1966
- Games: 162
- Teams: 20 (10 per league)
- TV partner: NBC

Draft
- Top draft pick: Steve Chilcott
- Picked by: New York Mets

Regular season
- Season MVP: AL: Frank Robinson (BAL); NL: Roberto Clemente (PIT)
- AL champions: Baltimore Orioles
- AL runners-up: Minnesota Twins
- NL champions: Los Angeles Dodgers
- NL runners-up: San Francisco Giants

World Series
- Champions: Baltimore Orioles
- Runners-up: Los Angeles Dodgers
- World Series MVP: Frank Robinson (BAL)

MLB seasons
- ← 1965 1967 →

Locations of teams for the 1966–1967 American League seasons
American League
Locations of teams for the 1966–1968 National League seasons
National League

The 1966 major league baseball season began on April 11, 1966. The regular season ended on October 2, with the Los Angeles Dodgers and Baltimore Orioles as the regular season champions of the National League and American League, respectively. The postseason began with Game 1 of the 63rd World Series on October 5 and ended with Game 4 on October 9. The Orioles swept the Dodgers in four games, capturing their first championship in franchise history. Going into the season, the defending World Series champions were the Los Angeles Dodgers from the 1965 season.

The 37th All-Star Game was held on July 12 at Busch Memorial Stadium in St. Louis, Missouri, home of the St. Louis Cardinals. The National League won, 2–1.

The Milwaukee Braves moved to Atlanta, Georgia as the Atlanta Braves, being the seventh team since 1953 to relocate, and the fourth of National League teams since then. The move from Milwaukee was the second time in modern-era baseball (since 1901) that the city was left without a team. Previously, the 1901 Milwaukee Brewers moved to St. Louis following the 1901 season (the team, the St. Louis Browns, went on to relocate to Baltimore as the Baltimore Orioles in 1953). Major league baseball would return to Milwaukee in 1970 with the relocation of the American League Seattle Pilots as the Milwaukee Brewers. The National League would see its return in 1998 when the Brewers transferred in to the league.

Three teams played the 1966 season in new stadiums. On April 12, the Braves ushered in Atlanta Stadium with the Pittsburgh Pirates taking a 3–2 win in 13 innings. One week later, Anaheim Stadium opened with the California Angels losing to the Chicago White Sox, 3–1 in the Angels' debut following their move from Los Angeles to nearby Orange County. On May 8, the St. Louis Cardinals closed out old Sportsman's Park/Busch Stadium I with a 10–5 loss to the San Francisco Giants before opening the new Busch Memorial Stadium four days later with a 4–3 win in 12 innings over the Atlanta Braves.

1966 would be William Eckert's first season as commissioner.

== Schedule ==
The 1966 schedule consisted of 162 games for all teams in the American League and National League, each of which had 10 teams. Each team was scheduled to play 18 games against the other nine teams of their respective league. This continued the format put in place by the American League since the 1961 season and by the National League since the 1962 season, and would be used until 1969.

American League Opening Day took place on April 11, featuring a game between the Cleveland Indians and Washington Senators, while National League Opening Day took place the following day, featuring six teams. The final day of the regular season was on October 2, which saw all 20 teams play, continuing the trend from the previous season. The World Series took place between October 5 and October 9.

== Rule change ==
The 1966 season would see the following rule change:

- The 15-day disabled list (now called injured list) was introduced, reducing the minimum time a player remained on the list from 30 to 15 days.

== Teams ==
An asterisk (*) denotes the ballpark a team played the minority of their home games at

League	Team	City	Ballpark	Capacity	Manager
American League	Baltimore Orioles	Baltimore, Maryland	Baltimore Memorial Stadium	52,185	Hank Bauer
American League	Boston Red Sox	Boston, Massachusetts	Fenway Park	33,524	Billy Herman
American League	Boston Red Sox	Boston, Massachusetts	Fenway Park	33,524	Pete Runnels
American League	California Angels	Anaheim, California	Anaheim Stadium	43,202	Bill Rigney
American League	Chicago White Sox	Chicago, Illinois	White Sox Park	46,550	Eddie Stanky
American League	Cleveland Indians	Cleveland, Ohio	Cleveland Stadium	73,811	Birdie Tebbetts
American League	Cleveland Indians	Cleveland, Ohio	Cleveland Stadium	73,811	George Strickland
American League	Detroit Tigers	Detroit, Michigan	Tiger Stadium	53,089	Chuck Dressen
American League	Detroit Tigers	Detroit, Michigan	Tiger Stadium	53,089	Bob Swift
American League	Detroit Tigers	Detroit, Michigan	Tiger Stadium	53,089	Frank Skaff
American League	Kansas City Athletics	Kansas City, Missouri	Municipal Stadium	34,165	Alvin Dark
American League	Minnesota Twins	Bloomington, Minnesota	Metropolitan Stadium	45,182	Sam Mele
American League	New York Yankees	New York, New York	Yankee Stadium	67,000	Johnny Keane
American League	New York Yankees	New York, New York	Yankee Stadium	67,000	Ralph Houk
American League	Washington Senators	Washington, D.C.	District of Columbia Stadium	43,500	Gil Hodges
National League	Atlanta Braves	Atlanta, Georgia	Atlanta Stadium	50,893	Bobby Bragan
National League	Atlanta Braves	Atlanta, Georgia	Atlanta Stadium	50,893	Billy Hitchcock
National League	Chicago Cubs	Chicago, Illinois	Wrigley Field	36,644	Leo Durocher
National League	Cincinnati Reds	Cincinnati, Ohio	Crosley Field	29,603	Don Heffner
National League	Cincinnati Reds	Cincinnati, Ohio	Crosley Field	29,603	Dave Bristol
National League	Houston Astros	Houston, Texas	Houston Astrodome	46,000	Grady Hatton
National League	Los Angeles Dodgers	Los Angeles, California	Dodger Stadium	56,000	Walter Alston
National League	New York Mets	New York, New York	Shea Stadium	55,300	Wes Westrum
National League	Philadelphia Phillies	Philadelphia, Pennsylvania	Connie Mack Stadium	33,608	Gene Mauch
National League	Pittsburgh Pirates	Pittsburgh, Pennsylvania	Forbes Field	35,500	Harry Walker
National League	San Francisco Giants	San Francisco, California	Candlestick Park	42,500	Herman Franks
National League	St. Louis Cardinals	St. Louis, Missouri	Busch Stadium*	30,500*	Red Schoendienst
National League	St. Louis Cardinals	St. Louis, Missouri	Civic Center Busch Memorial Stadium	49,275	Red Schoendienst

== Standings ==
=== American League ===
American League
Team	W	L	Pct.	GB	Home	Road
Baltimore Orioles	97	63	.606	—	48‍–‍31	49‍–‍32
Minnesota Twins	89	73	.549	9	49‍–‍32	40‍–‍41
Detroit Tigers	88	74	.543	10	42‍–‍39	46‍–‍35
Chicago White Sox	83	79	.512	15	45‍–‍36	38‍–‍43
Cleveland Indians	81	81	.500	17	41‍–‍40	40‍–‍41
California Angels	80	82	.494	18	42‍–‍39	38‍–‍43
Kansas City Athletics	74	86	.463	23	42‍–‍39	32‍–‍47
Washington Senators	71	88	.447	25½	42‍–‍36	29‍–‍52
Boston Red Sox	72	90	.444	26	40‍–‍41	32‍–‍49
New York Yankees	70	89	.440	26½	35‍–‍46	35‍–‍43

=== National League ===
National League
Team	W	L	Pct.	GB	Home	Road
Los Angeles Dodgers	95	67	.586	—	53‍–‍28	42‍–‍39
San Francisco Giants	93	68	.578	1½	47‍–‍34	46‍–‍34
Pittsburgh Pirates	92	70	.568	3	46‍–‍35	46‍–‍35
Philadelphia Phillies	87	75	.537	8	48‍–‍33	39‍–‍42
Atlanta Braves	85	77	.525	10	43‍–‍38	42‍–‍39
St. Louis Cardinals	83	79	.512	12	43‍–‍38	40‍–‍41
Cincinnati Reds	76	84	.475	18	46‍–‍33	30‍–‍51
Houston Astros	72	90	.444	23	45‍–‍36	27‍–‍54
New York Mets	66	95	.410	28½	32‍–‍49	34‍–‍46
Chicago Cubs	59	103	.364	36	32‍–‍49	27‍–‍54

=== Tie games ===
2 tie games (1 in AL, 1 in NL), which are not factored into winning percentage or games behind (and were often replayed again) occurred throughout the season.

==== American League ====
The Chicago White Sox and New York Yankees had one tie each.

- May 28, New York Yankees vs. Chicago White Sox, tied at 2 after a shortened five innings due to rain, following a 53 minute rain delay.

==== National League ====
The Atlanta Braves and Houston Astros had one tie each.

- July 16, Atlanta Braves vs. Houston Astros, tied at 1 after a shortened six innings on account of rain. Game called in the middle of the sixth inning.

== Postseason ==
The postseason began on October 5 and ended on October 9 with the Baltimore Orioles sweeping the Los Angeles Dodgers in the 1966 World Series in four games.

=== Bracket ===
World Series
AL	Baltimore Orioles	4
NL	Los Angeles Dodgers	0

== Managerial changes ==
=== Off-season ===
Team	Former Manager	New Manager
Chicago Cubs	Lou Klein	Leo Durocher
Chicago White Sox	Al López	Eddie Stanky
Cincinnati Reds	Dick Sisler	Don Heffner
Houston Astros	Lum Harris	Grady Hatton
Kansas City Athletics	Haywood Sullivan	Alvin Dark

=== In-season ===
Team	Former Manager	New Manager
Atlanta Braves	Bobby Bragan	Billy Hitchcock
Boston Red Sox	Billy Herman	Pete Runnels
Cincinnati Reds	Don Heffner	Dave Bristol
Cleveland Indians	Birdie Tebbetts	George Strickland
Detroit Tigers	Chuck Dressen	Bob Swift
Detroit Tigers	Bob Swift	Frank Skaff
New York Yankees	Johnny Keane	Ralph Houk

== League leaders ==
=== American League ===
Hitting leaders
Stat	Player	Total
AVG	Frank Robinson^{1} (BAL)	.316
OPS	Frank Robinson (BAL)	1.047
HR	Frank Robinson^{1} (BAL)	49
RBI	Frank Robinson^{1} (BAL)	122
R	Frank Robinson (BAL)	122
H	Tony Oliva (MIN)	191
SB	Bert Campaneris (KCA)	52

^{1} American League Triple Crown batting winner

Pitching leaders
Stat	Player	Total
W	Jim Kaat (MIN)	25
L	Mel Stottlemyre (NYY)	20
ERA	Gary Peters (CWS)	1.98
K	Sam McDowell (CLE)	225
IP	Jim Kaat (MIN)	304.2
SV	Jack Aker (KCA)	32
WHIP	Gary Peters (CWS)	0.982

Hall of Famer Sandy Koufax

=== National League ===
Hitting leaders
Stat	Player	Total
AVG	Matty Alou (PIT)	.342
OPS	Dick Allen (PHI)	1.027
HR	Hank Aaron (ATL)	44
RBI	Hank Aaron (ATL)	127
R	Felipe Alou (ATL)	122
H	Felipe Alou (ATL)	218
SB	Lou Brock (STL)	74

Pitching leaders
Stat	Player	Total
W	Sandy Koufax^{2} (LAD)	27
L	Dick Ellsworth (CHC)	22
ERA	Sandy Koufax^{2} (LAD)	1.73
K	Sandy Koufax^{2} (LAD)	317
IP	Sandy Koufax (LAD)	323.0
SV	Phil Regan (LAD)	21
WHIP	Juan Marichal (SF)	0.859

^{2} National League Triple Crown pitching winner

== Milestones ==
=== Batters ===
==== Cycles ====
- Billy Williams (CHC):
  - Williams hit for his first cycle, seventh in franchise history, and ninth natural cycle in major league history, in game two of a doubleheader on July 17 against the St. Louis Cardinals.
- Randy Hundley (CHC):
  - Hundley hit for his first cycle and eighth in franchise history, in game one of a doubleheader on August 11 against the Houston Astros.

==== Other batting accomplishments ====
- Hank Aaron (ATL):
  - Became the 12th player in Major League history to hit 400 home runs in the ninth inning against the Philadelphia Phillies on April 20.
- Willie Mays (SF):
  - Breaks the previous National League home run record held by Mel Ott when he hits his 512th home run against the Los Angeles Dodgers.
- Rich Rollins / Zoilo Versalles / Tony Oliva / Don Mincher / Harmon Killebrew (MIN):
  - Become the fourth group of players in Major League history to hit five home runs in one inning in the seventh inning against the Kansas City Athletics on June 9.
- Tony Cloninger (ATL):
  - Became the fifth player to hit two grand slams in a single game, in a 17–3 win over the San Francisco Giants on July 3.
  - Set a modern Major League record and tied an all-time record by a pitcher when he hits for nine RBIs in a single game on July 3.

=== Pitchers ===
==== No-hitters ====
- Sonny Siebert (CLE):
  - Siebert threw his first career no-hitter and the 11th no-hitter in franchise history, defeating the Washington Senators 2–0 on June 10. He walked one and struck out seven.

==== Other pitching accomplishments ====
- Jim Merritt (MIN):
  - Set an American League record for most consecutive strikeouts when he threw seven against the Washington Senators on July 21.

== Awards and honors ==
=== Regular season ===
Baseball Writers' Association of America Awards
BBWAA Award	National League	American League
Rookie of the Year	Tommy Helms (CIN)	Tommie Agee (CWS)
Cy Young Award	Sandy Koufax (LAD)	—
Most Valuable Player	Roberto Clemente (PIT)	Frank Robinson (BAL)
Babe Ruth Award (World Series MVP)	—	Frank Robinson (BAL)
Gold Glove Awards
Position	National League	American League
Pitcher	Bob Gibson (STL)	Jim Kaat (MIN)
Catcher	John Roseboro (LAD)	Bill Freehan (DET)
1st Base	Bill White (PHI)	Joe Pepitone (NYY)
2nd Base	Bill Mazeroski (PIT)	Bobby Knoop (CAL)
3rd Base	Ron Santo (CHC)	Brooks Robinson (BAL)
Shortstop	Gene Alley (PIT)	Luis Aparicio (BAL)
Outfield	Roberto Clemente (PIT)	Tommie Agee (CWS)
Outfield	Curt Flood (STL)	Al Kaline (DET)
Outfield	Willie Mays (SF)	Tony Oliva (MIN)

=== Other awards ===
- Hutch Award: Sandy Koufax (LAD)
- Sport Magazine's World Series Most Valuable Player Award: Frank Robinson (BAL)

The Sporting News Awards
Award	National League	American League
Player of the Year	—	Frank Robinson (BAL)
Pitcher of the Year	Sandy Koufax (LAD)	Jim Kaat (MIN)
Fireman of the Year (Relief pitcher)	Phil Regan (LAD)	Jack Aker (KCA)
Rookie Player of the Year	Tommy Helms (CHC)	Tommie Agee (CWS)
Rookie Pitcher of the Year	Don Sutton (LAD)	Jim Nash (KCA)
Comeback Player of the Year	Phil Regan (LAD)	Boog Powell (BAL)
Manager of the Year	—	Hank Bauer (BAL)
Executive of the Year	Lee MacPhail (MLB Chief Assistant)	

=== Monthly awards ===
==== Player of the Month ====
Month	National League
May	Juan Marichal (SF)
June	Gaylord Perry (SF)
July	Mike Shannon (STL)
August	Pete Rose (CIN)

=== Baseball Hall of Fame ===
- Ted Williams
- Casey Stengel (manager)

== Home field attendance ==
Team name	Wins	%±	Home attendance	%±	Per game
Los Angeles Dodgers	95	−2.1%	2,617,029	2.5%	32,309
New York Mets	66	32.0%	1,932,693	9.3%	23,860
Houston Astros	72	10.8%	1,872,108	−13.0%	23,112
St. Louis Cardinals	83	3.8%	1,712,980	38.0%	21,148
San Francisco Giants	93	−2.1%	1,657,192	7.2%	20,459
Atlanta Braves	85	−1.2%	1,539,801	177.1%	18,778
California Angels	80	6.7%	1,400,321	147.1%	17,288
Minnesota Twins	89	−12.7%	1,259,374	−13.9%	15,548
Baltimore Orioles	97	3.2%	1,203,366	54.0%	15,232
Pittsburgh Pirates	92	2.2%	1,196,618	31.6%	14,773
New York Yankees	70	−9.1%	1,124,648	−7.3%	13,715
Detroit Tigers	88	−1.1%	1,124,293	9.2%	13,880
Philadelphia Phillies	87	2.4%	1,108,201	−5.0%	13,681
Chicago White Sox	83	−12.6%	990,016	−12.4%	12,222
Cleveland Indians	81	−6.9%	903,359	−3.4%	11,153
Boston Red Sox	72	16.1%	811,172	24.4%	10,014
Kansas City Athletics	74	25.4%	773,929	46.5%	9,555
Cincinnati Reds	76	−14.6%	742,958	−29.1%	9,405
Chicago Cubs	59	−18.1%	635,891	−0.9%	7,851
Washington Senators	71	1.4%	576,260	2.9%	7,388

== Venues ==
The 1966 season saw three teams move to three new venues.

- With the relocation of the Milwaukee Braves from Milwaukee, Wisconsin to Atlanta, Georgia as the Atlanta Braves, they leave Milwaukee County Stadium (where they played 13 seasons) and move into Atlanta Stadium. They would go on to play there for 31 seasons through 1996.
- The California Angels leave Chavez Ravine Stadium (Dodger Stadium) and Los Angeles, California (where they played four seasons), and opened Anaheim Stadium in Anaheim, California, where they remain to this day.
- The St. Louis Cardinals would play their last game at Busch Stadium on May 8, having played 58 seasons there going back to 1882 (with a gap between 1893 and part of 1920), and opened Civic Center Busch Memorial Stadium (with the NFL's St. Louis Cardinals) on May 12, where they would go on to play for 40 seasons through 2005.

== Media ==
=== Television ===
For the first time, NBC became exclusive national TV broadcaster of MLB. The network replaced ABC as the holder of the Games of the Week package. The New York Yankees and Philadelphia Phillies, which had instead sold their TV rights to CBS in prior seasons, also joined NBC's package. The new package under NBC called for 28 games, as compared to the 123 combined among three networks during the 1960s. NBC also continued to air the All-Star Game and World Series.

== See also ==
- 1966 in baseball (Events, Births, Deaths)
- 1966 Nippon Professional Baseball season
