= Jim Thome =

American baseball player (born 1970)

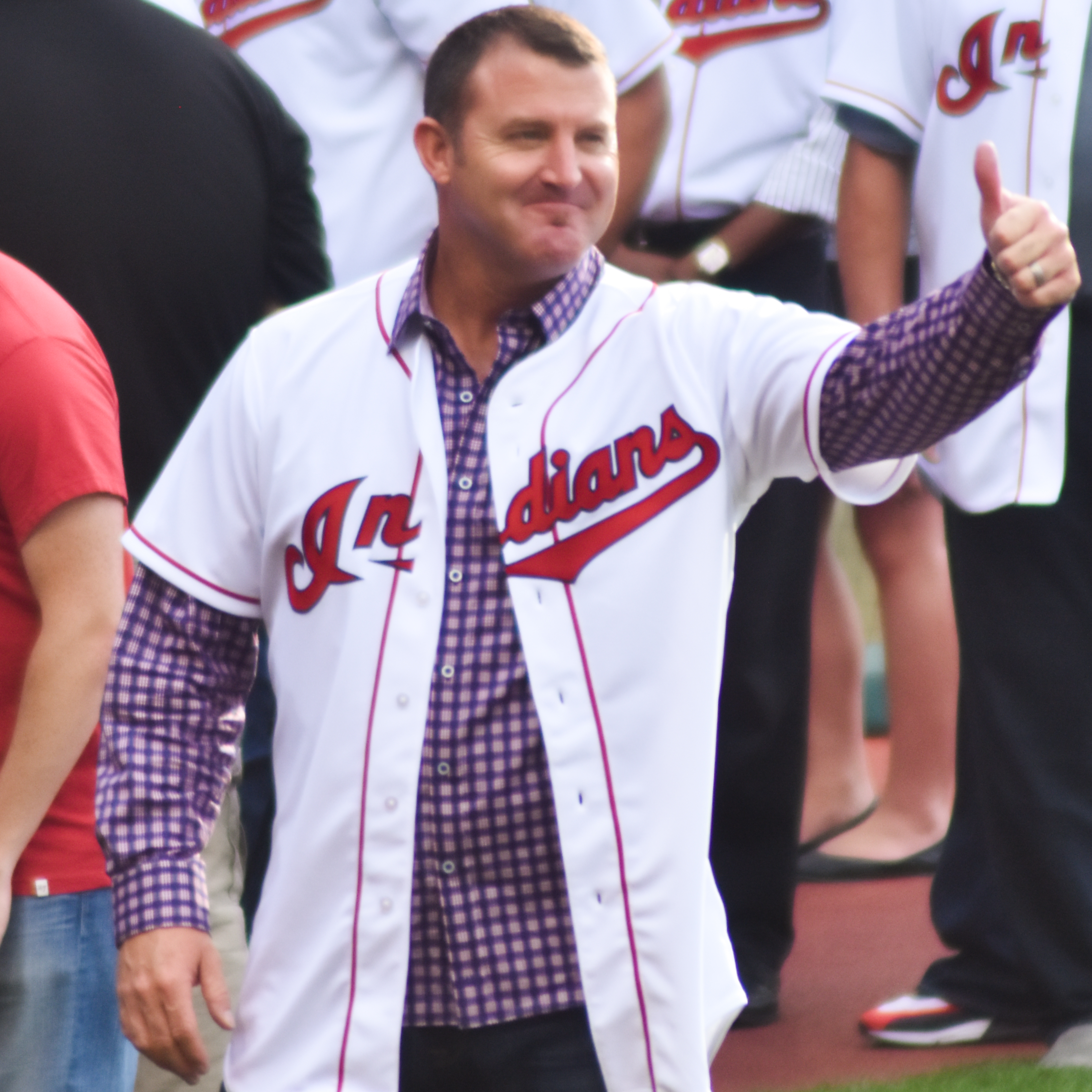
- Thome in 2015
- First baseman / Designated hitter / Third baseman
- Born: August 27, 1970 (age 56); Peoria, Illinois, U.S.
- Batted: Left Threw: Right

MLB debut
- September 4, 1991, for the Cleveland Indians

Last MLB appearance
- October 3, 2012, for the Baltimore Orioles

MLB statistics
- Batting average: .276
- Hits: 2,328
- Home runs: 612
- Runs batted in: 1,699
- Stats at Baseball Reference

Teams
- Cleveland Indians (1991–2002); Philadelphia Phillies (2003–2005); Chicago White Sox (2006–2009); Los Angeles Dodgers (2009); Minnesota Twins (2010–2011); Cleveland Indians (2011); Philadelphia Phillies (2012); Baltimore Orioles (2012)

Career highlights and awards
- 5× All-Star (1997–1999, 2004, 2006); Silver Slugger Award (1996); AL Comeback Player of the Year (2006); Roberto Clemente Award (2002); NL home run leader (2003); Cleveland Guardians No. 25 retired; Cleveland Guardians Hall of Fame; Philadelphia Phillies Wall of Fame

Member of the National

Baseball Hall of Fame
- Induction: 2018
- Vote: 89.8% (first ballot)

James Howard Thome (/ˈtoʊmi/ TOH-mee; born August 27, 1970) is an American former professional baseball player—a first baseman, third baseman and designated hitter—who played in Major League Baseball (MLB) for 22 seasons (1991–2012). A prolific power hitter, Thome hit 612 home runs during his career—the eighth-most all time. He amassed a total of 2,328 hits and 1,699 runs batted in (RBIs). His career batting average was .276. He was a member of five All-Star teams and won a Silver Slugger Award in 1996.

Thome grew up in Peoria, Illinois, as part of a large blue-collar family of athletes. After attending Illinois Central College, he was drafted by the Indians in the 1989 draft, and made his big league debut in 1991. With the Indians, he was part of a core of players that led the franchise to five consecutive playoff appearances in the 1990s, including World Series appearances in 1995 and 1997. Thome spent over a decade with Cleveland, before leaving via free agency after the 2002 season, to join the Philadelphia Phillies, with whom he spent the following three seasons. Traded to the Chicago White Sox before the 2006 season, he won the American League (AL) Comeback Player of the Year Award that year and joined the 500 home run club during his three-season tenure with the White Sox. By this point in his career, back pain limited Thome to being a designated hitter. After stints with the Los Angeles Dodgers and Minnesota Twins, he made brief returns to Cleveland and Philadelphia, before ending his career with the Baltimore Orioles. Upon retiring, Thome accepted an executive position with the White Sox.

Throughout his career, Thome's strength was power hitting. In 12 different seasons, he hit at least 30 home runs, topping 40 home runs in six of those seasons. He hit a career-high 52 home runs in 2002, and in 2003 he led the National League in home runs with 47. Due in part to his ability to draw walks, with 12 seasons of at least 90 bases on balls, he finished his career with a .402 on-base percentage. Thome's career on-base plus slugging (OPS) of .956 ranks 19th all-time. In 2011, he became only the eighth MLB player to hit 600 home runs. Thome is the career leader in walk-off home runs with 13. One of his trademarks was his unique batting stance, in which he held the bat out with his right hand and pointed it at right field before the pitcher threw, something he first saw in The Natural. Thome was known for his consistently positive attitude and "gregarious" personality. An active philanthropist during his playing career, he was honored with two Marvin Miller Man of the Year Awards, a Lou Gehrig Memorial Award, and a Roberto Clemente Award for his community involvement. In 2018, Thome was inducted into the National Baseball Hall of Fame in his first year of eligibility.

== Early life ==
Thome was born in Peoria, Illinois, on August 27, 1970, and is the youngest of five children. Many of the Thome family played sports: Jim's grandmother was hired at a local Caterpillar plant solely to play for the company's softball team; his father built bulldozers for Caterpillar and played slow-pitch softball; his aunt Caroline Thome Hart is in the Women's Softball Hall of Fame; and his two older brothers, Chuck III and Randy, played baseball at Limestone High School. Thome learned to play baseball from his father on a tennis court, and also played basketball in what he described as the "ghetto" of Peoria, noting that he was the only white kid there but that he earned the respect of his fellow players. One day during his youth, Thome sneaked into the Cubs' clubhouse at Wrigley Field in an unsuccessful attempt to obtain an autograph from his favorite player, Dave Kingman. Though Thome received signatures from several other players, this experience influenced him to be generous with signing autographs for fans during his playing career.

As with his older brothers, Thome attended Limestone High School where he achieved all-state honors in basketball and as a baseball shortstop. He played American Legion Baseball for Bartonville Limestone Post 979 in his hometown, as well. Although he had hoped to draw the attention of scouts, at just 175 pounds (79 kg) he was relatively underweight for his 6-foot-2-inch (188 cm) height, meaning that he attracted only passing interest—the average Major League Baseball (MLB) player weighed 195 pounds (88 kg) in 1993. Thome graduated in 1988 and, after not being drafted, enrolled at Illinois Central College where he continued his baseball and basketball careers. After one season, he was drafted by MLB's Cleveland Indians as an "afterthought" in the 13th round (333rd overall) of the 1989 MLB draft.

== Professional career ==
=== Minor leagues (1989–1991) ===
For the 1989 season, Thome was assigned to the Gulf Coast League Indians, a minor league affiliate of the Cleveland Indians. He finished the year with a .237 batting average, no home runs, and 22 runs batted in (RBIs) in 55 games. After his rookie season, he met "hitting guru" Charlie Manuel, who later became his manager and mentor. Unlike most Indians staff, Manuel saw potential in Thome and worked hard with him, particularly on his hip motion while swinging the bat. Thome later said, "[Manuel] saw something in me I didn't." During this work, Manuel suggested to Thome that he point his bat out to center field before the pitch to relax himself like Roy Hobbs did when batting in the baseball film The Natural. The work paid off; in 1990, Thome hit .340 and totaled 16 home runs and 50 RBIs in 67 games playing at both the Rookie and Class A levels of the minor leagues. Thome spent most of the 1991 season splitting time between Double-A and Triple-A where, in combination, he hit .319 with seven home runs and 73 RBIs in 125 games.

=== Cleveland Indians (1991–2002) ===
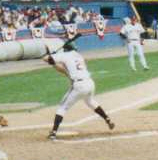
Thome batting for the Cleveland Indians in 1993

Thome made his MLB debut on September 4, 1991, as a third baseman against the Minnesota Twins. In the game, he recorded two hits in four at bats (2-for-4). He hit his first career home run on October 4. Injuries shortened his 1992 campaign, during which he played for both the Indians and their Triple-A affiliate, the Colorado Springs Sky Sox. Across the minor and major leagues that year, he combined to hit .236 with four home runs and 26 RBIs in 52 games. In 1993, playing mostly for the Charlotte Knights, the Indians' new Triple-A affiliate, he led the International League with a .332 batting average and 102 RBIs, complemented by 25 home runs in 115 games. This performance earned him a late season promotion to the major league, where he hit .266 with seven home runs and 22 RBIs in 47 games.

Thome spent the entire 1994 season with Cleveland, playing in 98 games while hitting .268 with 20 home runs and 52 RBIs, before the 1994 players' strike forced cancellation of the season's remaining games. Thome achieved his first career multi-home run game, hitting two solo home runs on June 22, 1994, against Detroit Tigers' pitcher John Doherty.

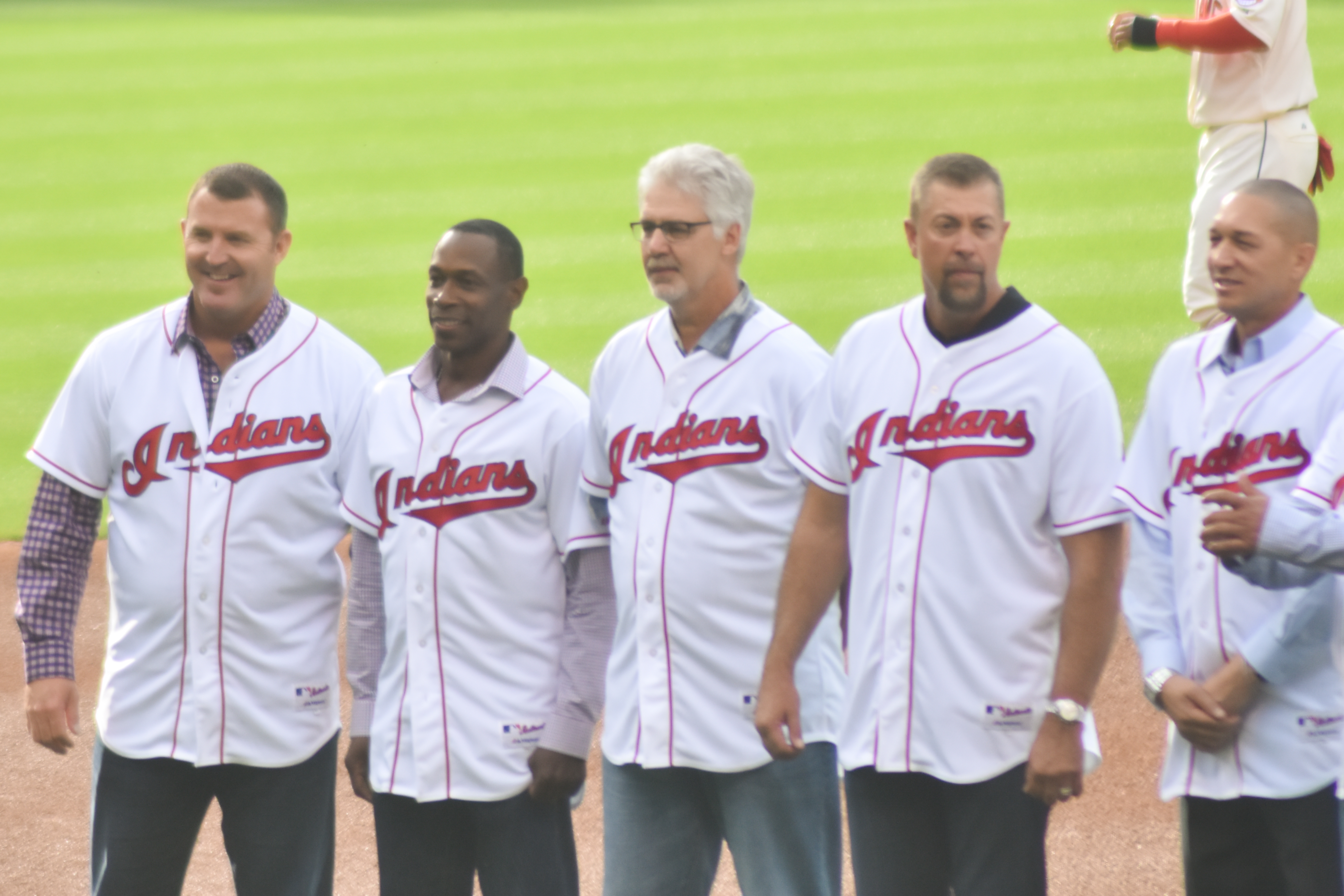
Thome (left) in 2015, during a reunion with his 1995 Indians teammates

Part of a strong Cleveland lineup in 1995, Thome hit .314 with 25 home runs and 73 RBIs in 137 games. The Indians won the American League pennant but lost the 1995 World Series to the Atlanta Braves in six games. Thome hit .211 in the World Series with one home run and two RBIs. During the 1996 season, Thome hit 38 home runs.

Before their 1997 season, the Indians moved Thome, originally a third baseman, to first base after acquiring third baseman Matt Williams from the San Francisco Giants. That year, Thome helped the Indians set a new franchise single-season record for home runs (220), contributing 40 of them. Thome also totaled an AL-high 120 walks to go along with 102 RBIs in 147 games. Cleveland returned to the World Series, but they lost to the Florida Marlins in seven games; Thome hit .286 with two home runs and four RBIs in the World Series.

An article in Sports Illustrated published in July 1998 commented that despite Thome's early career success (two All-Star Games and appearances in two of the previous three World Series), he was only "faintly famous" nationally and was not particularly well known outside of Cleveland or his hometown, Peoria. His former teammate Jeromy Burnitz said, "You can't really say he's underrated, because everybody considers him one of the top hitters in the American League, but he's surrounded by so many good players, it's hard to stand out on that team." In August, Thome broke a bone in his right hand and spent several weeks on the disabled list, missing 35 games. He finished the year with 30 home runs and 85 RBIs while posting a .293 batting average in 123 games. Thome hit four home runs in the AL Championship Series against the New York Yankees, but Cleveland lost the series in six games.

In 1999, Thome's batting average fell to .277, but he increased both his home run and RBI totals to 33 and 108, respectively. On July 3, 1999, against Kansas City Royals pitcher Don Wengert, Thome hit a 511-foot (156 m) home run at Jacobs Field, the longest home run ever at a Cleveland ballpark. Thome hit four home runs in the AL Division Series against the Boston Red Sox, but the Indians lost the series three games to two.

During the 2000 season, Thome hit .269 with 37 home runs and 106 RBIs in 158 games. In 2001, he finished second in the AL with 49 home runs. In addition, Thome had 124 RBIs and 111 walks in 156 games. However, he led the league with 185 strikeouts.

Thome had his best season with Cleveland in 2002, leading the AL in walks (122), slugging percentage (.677) and on-base plus slugging (OPS) (1.122), while batting .304 (16th in AL) with a .445 on-base percentage (second in AL). He also hit a career-high 52 home runs (second in AL) and collected 118 RBIs (seventh in AL). The 52 home runs set a new Cleveland Indians' single-season record and made Thome the 21st major league player to join the 50 home run club. During his stint with the Cleveland Indians, when Jim Thome would hit a home run, the scoreboard would often display "THOME RUN" to mark this accomplishment. He was also known as the "THOMENATOR" during this time. On December 6, 2002, Thome, who was a free agent, signed a six-year, $85 million contract with the Philadelphia Phillies – he thought the Phillies were closer to winning a championship than the Indians. With the Phillies, Thome's salary rose from $8 million per year to $11 million per year. Thome hit a franchise record 334 home runs in his first stint with the Indians.

=== Philadelphia Phillies (2003–2005) ===
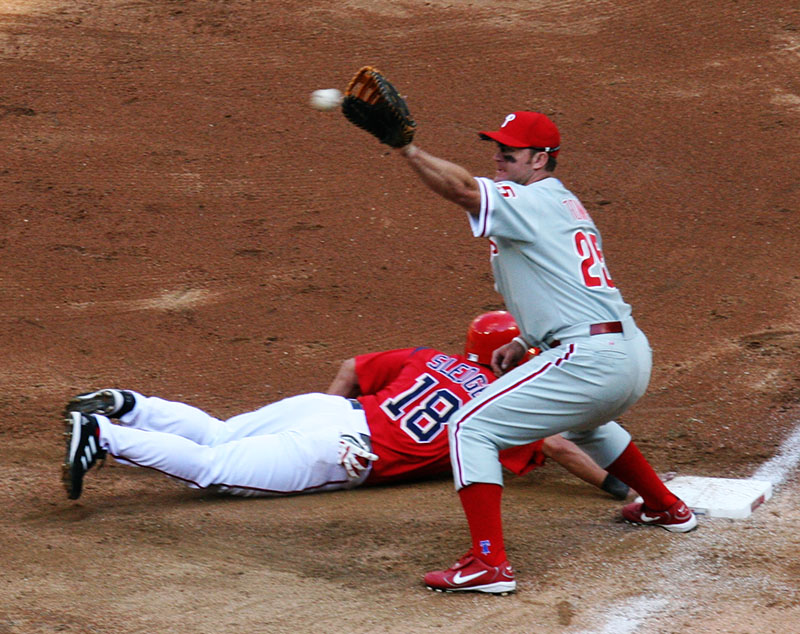
Thome with the Philadelphia Phillies in 2005

Thome hit 47 home runs in his first season with the Phillies, finishing one behind Mike Schmidt's single-season team record of 48 in 1980, and tied with Alex Rodriguez for the MLB lead in 2003. On June 14, 2004, at Citizens Bank Park, Thome hit his 400th career home run, surpassing Al Kaline for 37th on the all-time home run list. He ended the 2004 season batting .274 with 42 home runs and 105 RBIs in 143 games. In 2004, Thome won the Lou Gehrig Memorial Award, which is given to players who best exemplify Gehrig's character and integrity both on and off the field.

Thome missed a significant portion of the first half of the Phillies' 2005 season due to injury; he compiled only a .207 batting average with seven home runs and 30 RBIs going into the All-Star break. He had season-ending surgery on his right elbow in August, while his replacement at first base, Ryan Howard, won the NL Rookie of the Year Award. The Phillies traded Thome and cash considerations to the Chicago White Sox on November 25, 2005, for outfielder Aaron Rowand and minor league pitching prospects Gio González and Daniel Haigwood. Though the emergence of Howard made Thome more expendable to the squad, another factor in his trade to the White Sox was his family situation – Thome's mother, the "go-to lady" in his family and his biggest fan, had died a year earlier, and he worried about his father. Since Philadelphia was willing to trade him, Thome waived the no-trade clause in his contract for the good of the team and requested that if possible, they trade him to either the Chicago White Sox or Cubs so he could be near his father.

=== Chicago White Sox (2006–2009) ===
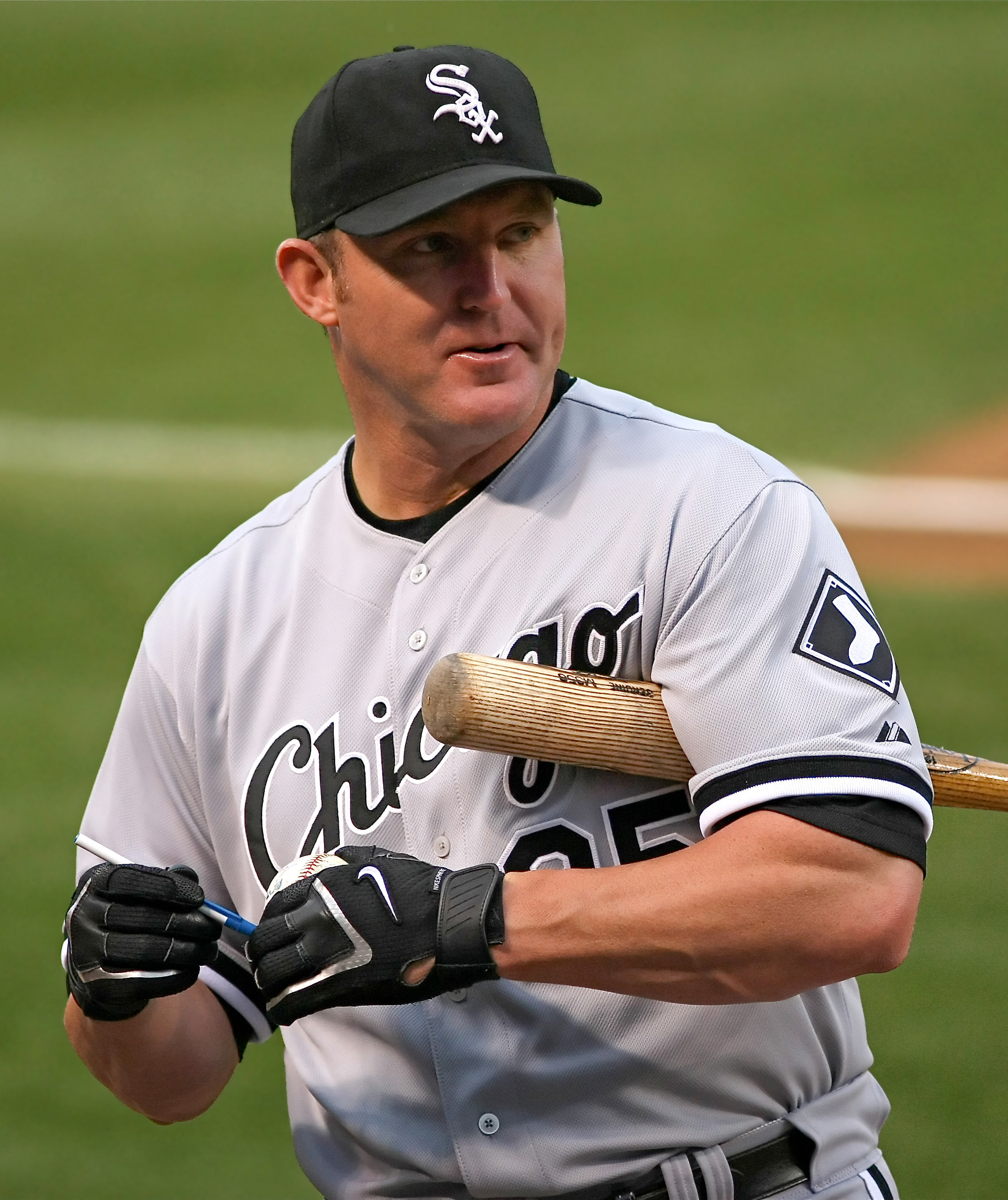
Thome with the Chicago White Sox in 2008

Thome became Chicago's regular designated hitter in April 2006 and flourished in his first season in Chicago. He set the team record for most home runs in the month of April (10), overtaking Frank Thomas's previous record by one. He also set a major league record by scoring in each of Chicago's first 17 games. For the season, Thome hit 42 home runs, drove in 109 runs, and hit .288 in 143 games, though he struck out in 30% of his plate appearances, the highest percentage in the AL. On May 1, 2006, Thome returned to Cleveland to play against the Indians in his first game as a visitor at Jacobs Field, and received an unenthusiastic reception.

On September 16, 2007, Thome joined the 500 home run club by hitting a walk-off home run against Los Angeles Angels pitcher Dustin Moseley. Thome became the 23rd major leaguer to reach the milestone and the third in the 2007 MLB season (the others were Frank Thomas and Alex Rodriguez), as well as the first ever to do it with a walk-off home run. Several family members including his father were on hand to witness the accomplishment, which occurred at a game during which the White Sox distributed free Thome bobbleheads to fans. Thome celebrated by pointing upward in homage to his late mother as he rounded the bases.

On June 4, 2008, Thome hit a 464-foot (141 m) home run—which at the time was the ninth-longest home run in U.S. Cellular Field history—against Kansas City Royals pitcher Luke Hochevar in a 6–4 White Sox victory. He hit a solo home run in the AL Central Tiebreaker game, which proved to be the difference as the White Sox defeated the Minnesota Twins, 1–0. Those two 2008 home runs are honored with a plaque in the center field Fan Deck at Rate Field.

Thome's hitting remained strong during Chicago's 2009 season, as he hit .249 with 23 home runs and 74 RBIs in 107 games, including his 550th career home run on June 1. On July 17, 2009, he hit a grand slam and a three-run home run for a single-game career-high seven RBIs. By the conclusion of the season, he had passed Reggie Jackson for 11th place on the all-time home run list with 564 home runs.

=== Los Angeles Dodgers (2009) ===
On August 31, 2009, the White Sox traded Thome to the Los Angeles Dodgers along with financial considerations for minor league infielder Justin Fuller. Thome waived his no-trade clause because he thought the Dodgers could win the World Series, but Thome's only appearances with the Dodgers were as a pinch hitter, due to chronic foot injuries that limited his mobility. Thome reunited with former Cleveland teammate Manny Ramirez in Los Angeles. He hit .235 (4-for-17) with no home runs and three RBIs in 17 games with the Dodgers. After the season, Thome filed for free agency.

=== Minnesota Twins (2010–2011) ===
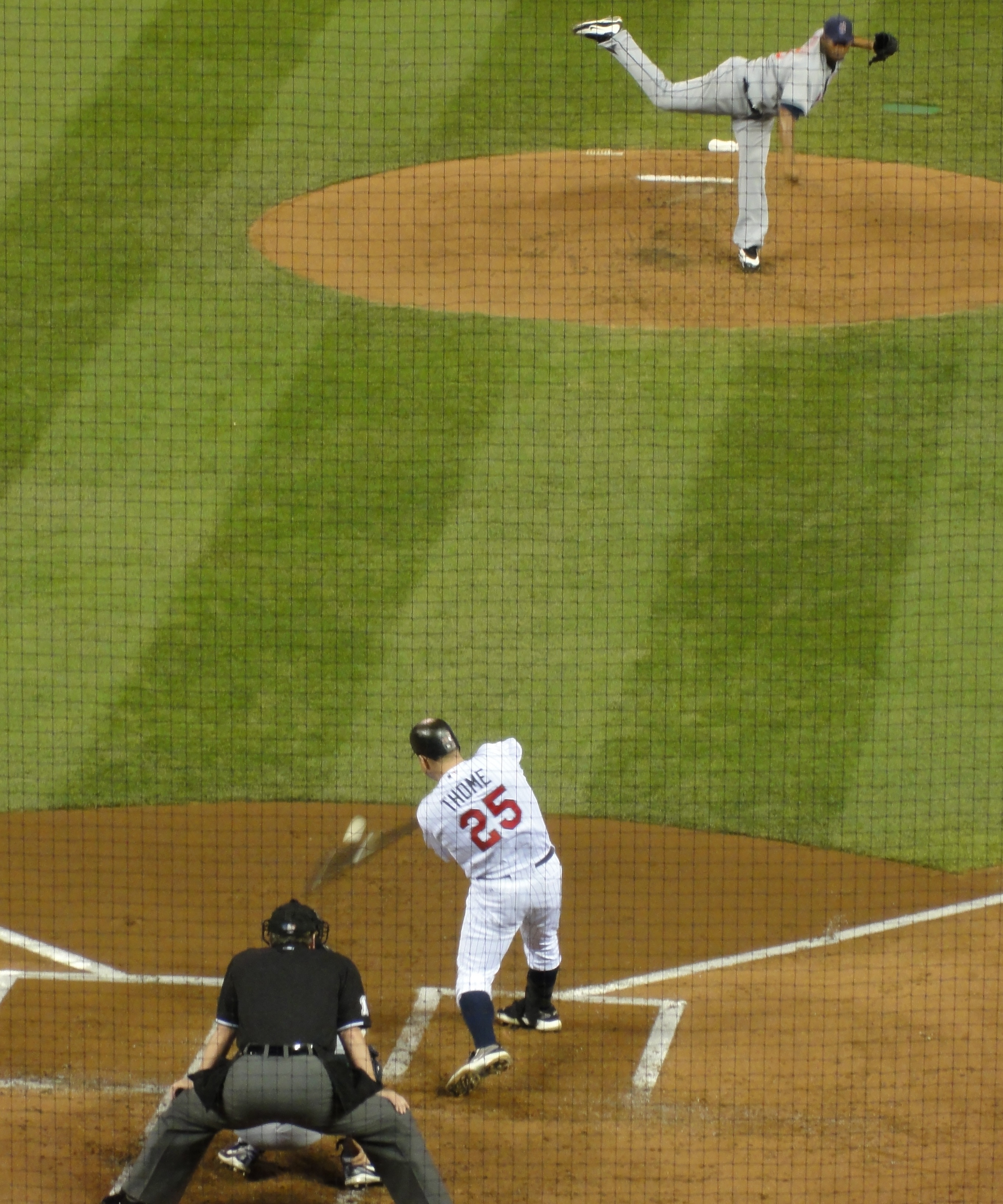
Thome hitting a solo home with the Minnesota Twins against the Cleveland Indians, September 21, 2010

On January 26, 2010, Thome signed a one-year, $1.5 million contract with the Minnesota Twins. Thome hit his first home run with the Twins on April 8, during the Twins' season-opening road trip. The Twins opened Target Field, their new home stadium, on April 12, 2010. This was the third time in Thome's career that his team had opened a new stadium – the 1994 Cleveland Indians when they opened Jacobs Field, and the 2004 Philadelphia Phillies when they opened Citizens Bank Park. On July 3, Thome hit two home runs, passing fellow Twin Harmon Killebrew for tenth on the all-time home run list. The game was stopped and the Twins played a pre-recorded message from Killebrew congratulating Thome on the accomplishment, during which Killebrew noted he was happy Thome did it while a member of the Twins. Thome hit the first walk-off hit in Target Field on August 17, a 445-foot two-run home run in the bottom of the 10th inning against the White Sox. It was the 12th walk-off home run of his career, tying him for the most all time (a record he subsequently broke). On September 4, Thome again hit two home runs in a single game to tie and then pass Mark McGwire for the ninth spot on the career home run list. Thome surpassed Frank Robinson's home run total on September 11, when he hit his 587th career home run in the top of the 12th inning in Cleveland. Toward the end of the season, Thome commented that playing with the Twins made him feel rejuvenated. He finished the 2010 season with a .283 average, 25 home runs and 59 RBIs in 108 games. Thome posted his best slugging percentage since 2002.

In January 2011, Thome accepted a one-year, $3 million contract with incentives to continue playing for the Twins. On July 17, Thome hit the longest home run ever at Target Field, a 490-foot (150 m) home run into the upper deck in right-center field. He hit his 599th and 600th career home runs (in consecutive at-bats) at Comerica Park in Detroit on August 15, making him only the eighth player to achieve that home run total.

=== Second stint with Cleveland (2011) ===
On August 26, 2011, Thome waived his contractual no-trade clause to return to his first team, the Cleveland Indians, in exchange for future considerations for the Twins. On September 18, the clubs announced that Minnesota had received $20,000 for him, which Aaron Gleeman of NBC Sports called "silly" and "nothing"; Paul Hoynes of The Plain Dealer wrote that ticket and jersey sales alone from re-acquiring Thome covered the money they paid to acquire him. On September 23, Cleveland held a ceremony to honor Thome, and revealed plans to erect a statue depicting him in Heritage Park. In the game, he hit a home run that landed near the proposed location for his statue. While with Cleveland in 2011, Thome played in 22 games, predominantly hitting fifth in the batting order, and he posted a .296 batting average with three home runs and 10 RBIs. Through 2011, Thome was second among all active major leaguers in career home runs (604; behind Alex Rodriguez) and RBIs (1,674; Rodriguez), and fifth in career slugging percentage (.556; behind Albert Pujols, Rodriguez, Ryan Braun, and Howard). Thome is currently the Indians/Guardians' all-time leader in home runs (337), walks (1,008), and strikeouts (1,400).

=== Second stint with Philadelphia (2012) ===
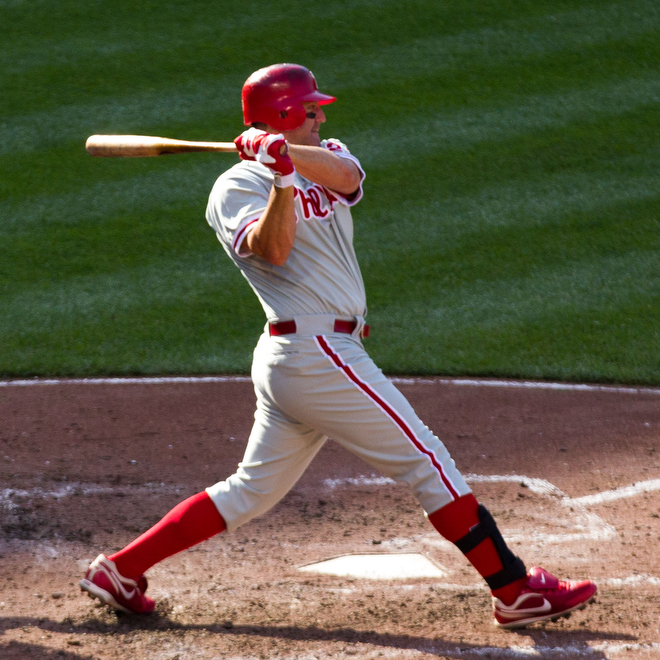
Thome during his second stint with the Philadelphia Phillies in 2012

On November 4, 2011, Thome agreed to a one-year, $1.25 million deal that returned him to Philadelphia. He called coming back to Philadelphia a "no-brainer" in his news conference. He also mentioned that, due to Ryan Howard's Achilles tendon injury, he would "spend the offseason preparing himself to play first base once or twice a week", despite not having played defensively since 2007. Thome started his first game at first base since 2007 on April 8, 2012, during which he started a 3–6–3 double play.

Thome experienced stiffness in his lower back in the Phillies' game against the Chicago Cubs on April 28, and early in May, he was placed on the 15-day disabled list with a strained lower back. At the time, he was batting only .100. Thome returned to the club in early June, and prepared for interleague play against the Baltimore Orioles as the DH. Thome finished the nine-game interleague road trip with four home runs and 14 RBIs.

On June 17, Thome became the fourth major league player to hit 100 home runs with three different teams, joining Reggie Jackson, Darrell Evans and Rodriguez. Six days later, Thome hit a pinch-hit walk-off home run in the ninth inning off of Jake McGee to beat the Tampa Bay Rays, 7–6. This was Thome's 609th home run, tying Sammy Sosa for seventh all-time in home runs while also setting the new record for most walk-off home runs (13) in the modern era. Thome's last game as a Phillie was an afternoon loss to the Miami Marlins on June 30. After the game (which coincided with Howard's return from the disabled list), the team announced that Thome had been traded to Baltimore to serve as their designated hitter.

=== Baltimore Orioles (2012) ===
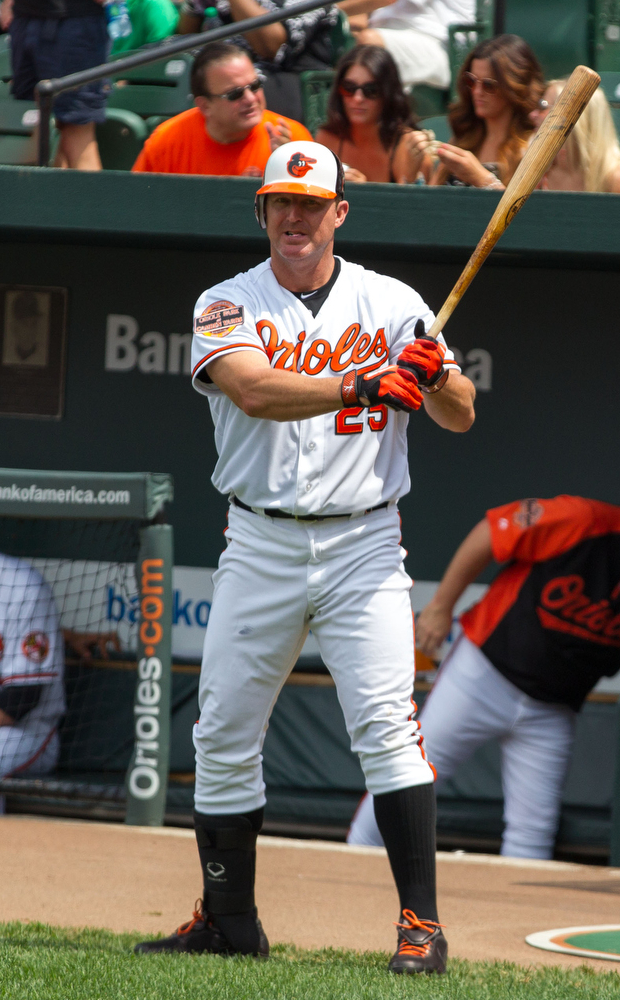
Thome with the Baltimore Orioles in 2012

The Orioles cited Thome's veteran experience on a playoff-bound team as a primary factor in acquiring him. Orioles catcher Matt Wieters said of Thome,

"I think you look at him and say: This is a guy who loves the game more than anyone. He's the first guy to the park, the first guy to the weight room, the first guy hitting."

On July 20, Thome hit his first home run with the Orioles, his 610th of all time moving him past Sosa for seventh place all-time, against the Indians at Progressive Field. On August 6, Thome was placed on the 15-day disabled list with a herniated disk; he remained on the DL until September 21. In his first game back, he drove in the game-winning run in extra innings against the Boston Red Sox. After beating the Indians in a game where he hit his 611th career home run, Thome said, "There's a lot [of] memories. I've had great memories on that side and then coming in here as an opponent against them. Any time you come home, they say, it's very special. It's even more special to get the W's. That's, I think, the main thing. The bottom line is I played here a long time." Orioles teammates remarked at Thome's commitment to talking about the game while in the dugout. Thome remarked, "I talk the game. When I sit in the dugout during games, I talk baseball to these guys. They'll ask, 'Hey, what's this pitcher like?' or 'What about the game?' 'What about all those Indians teams you were on?' I did it to Eddie Murray when he was in his 40s." The Orioles made the playoffs, but lost in five games to the Yankees during the AL Division Series. Thome hit .133 in the playoffs with no home runs or RBIs.

== Post-playing career ==
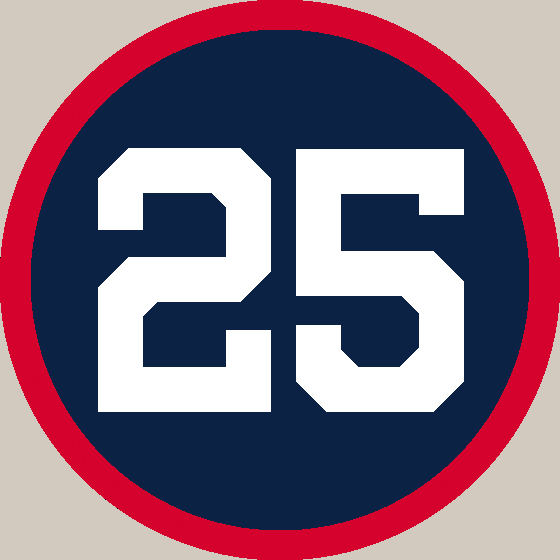
Jim Thome's number 25 was retired by the Cleveland Indians in 2018.

On July 2, 2013, Thome joined the White Sox organization as special assistant to the general manager. In the future, Thome aspires to be a manager, an aspiration that White Sox chairman Jerry Reinsdorf wholeheartedly supports; Reinsdorf commented, "He can be a batting coach. He'd be a great batting coach, but someday he'll be a manager." In March 2014, Thome clarified that he was not officially retired; while he "loves" his front office job with the White Sox, he would "have to take" a call about him playing again. However, on August 2, 2014, he signed a one-day contract with the Cleveland Indians to retire officially as a member of the team. In addition to his role with the White Sox, Thome currently serves as an analyst for MLB Network.

On January 24, 2018, Thome was elected into the National Baseball Hall of Fame and Museum. He was formally inducted on July 29, 2018, alongside Trevor Hoffman, Vladimir Guerrero, and Chipper Jones. He was the first person to be inducted as an Indian without the use of Chief Wahoo on his plaque since the mascot's inception in 1947. The Indians retired Thome's number 25 on August 18, 2018.

On February 23, 2022, Thome was announced as the president of the Major League Baseball Players Alumni Association, succeeding Brooks Robinson.

== Player profile ==
=== Offense ===
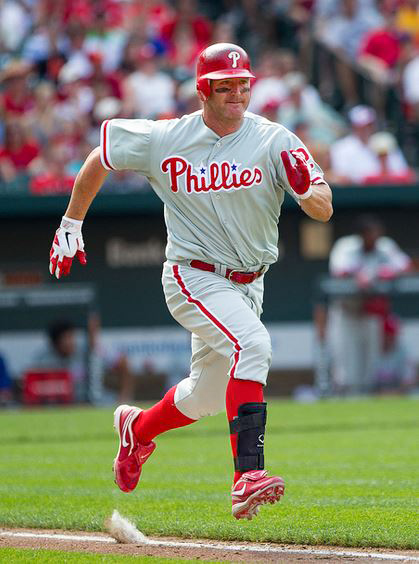
In the latter part of his career, Thome (photographed while with the Philadelphia Phillies) ran at a slower rate, partly due to injury

Thome is regarded as a great example of a "pure" power hitter, as indicated by his .278 isolated power rating. Thome's consistency was a draw for clubs to continue to sign him, even toward the end of his 22-year career and after most sluggers' productivity fades. In 2011, he was ranked the sixth-best DH in MLB history by Fox Sports. During his career, he compiled a .284 batting average against fastballs, but just a .170 batting average against sliders.

Since Thome was a pull hitter, opposing teams often employed a defensive shift against him, by playing three infielders on the right side of the field and the outfielders towards his pull side, which put teams in a better position to field batted balls. In 2011, Lindy's Sports described him as an "extremely patient veteran slugger who launches cripple fastballs and breaking-ball mistakes to all fields", though they did note that he struck out frequently, had poor speed, and should serve only as a designated hitter. During his career, he had strong power numbers; in 15 of his 22 seasons, he had a slugging percentage over .500. He is an example of a "three-true-outcome" player; 47.6% of his career plate appearances resulted in either home runs, strikeouts, or walks, the highest of all time by nearly seven percentage points. Thome averaged 111 walks per 162 games, and currently ranks seventh on the MLB career walks list with 1,747. He led the American League in walks in three seasons, all with Cleveland (1997, 1999 and 2002). He is a self-described slow runner, but has said that he always hustled. He stole only 19 bases after 1994.

=== Defense ===
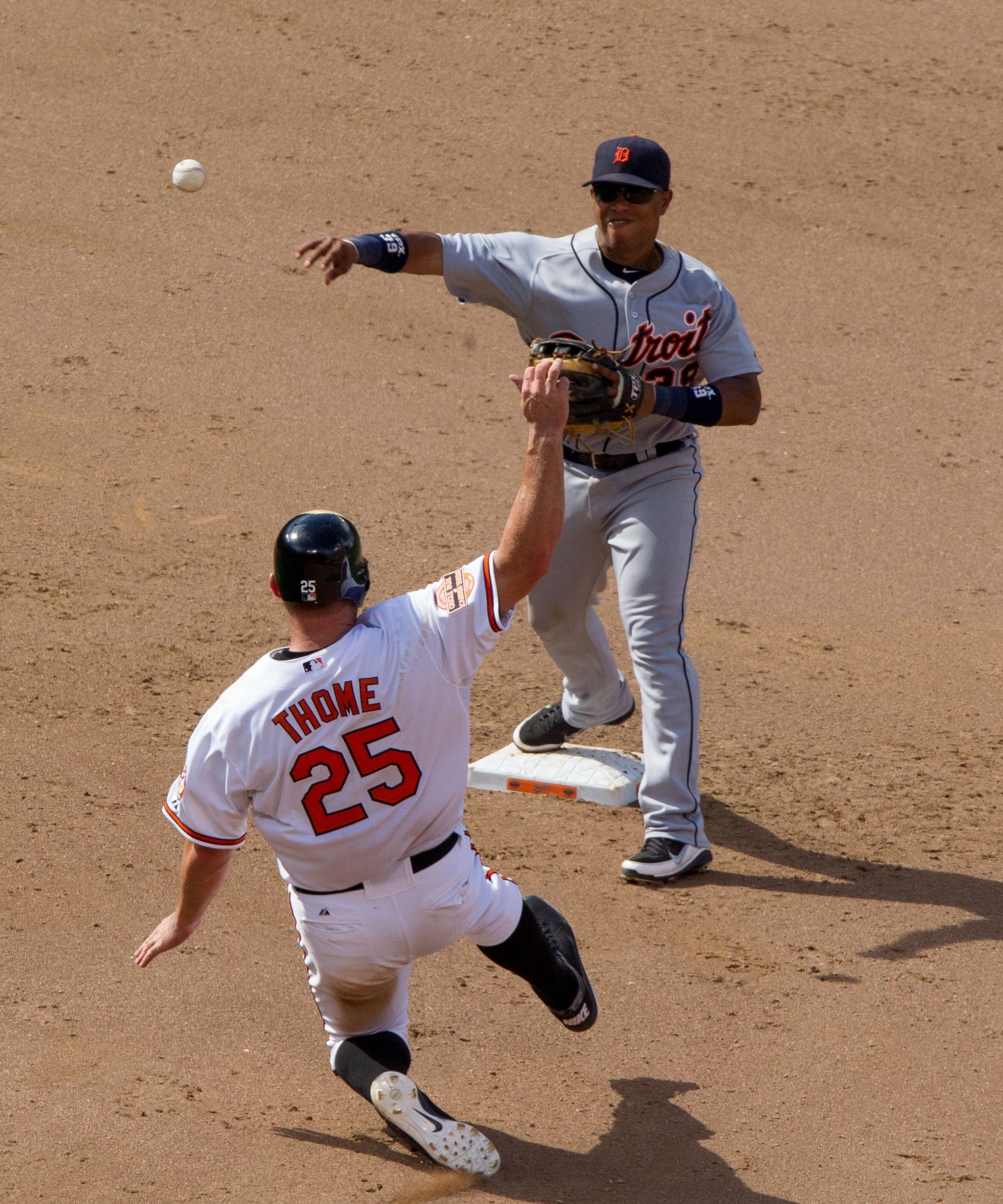
Thome sliding into second base while with the Baltimore Orioles

Thome began his career playing third base and did so until the 1997 season, when he converted to first base to make room at third after the Indians traded for Matt Williams. Injuries, however, took their toll and confined him almost exclusively to being a designated hitter in the latter stages of his career. Overall, he spent 10 separate stints on the disabled list, mostly for his back. By the end of Thome's career, his back prevented him from playing the field effectively—he played first base four times with the Phillies in 2012, which marked the first time he played the field since 2007 with the White Sox. By the end of his career, writers described him as being a "huge liability in the field".

=== Playing characteristics ===
Thome was known throughout the baseball world for wearing high socks and for his unique batting stance. In 1997, the Indians wore high socks for his birthday in August, but ended up wearing them for the remainder of the season out of superstition and eventually reached the World Series. Upon his return to the Indians in 2011, the club again sported the high socks as a tribute. His batting stance featured him pointing his bat to center field prior to the pitch. Thome adopted this stance from Charlie Manuel, who was the Indians hitting coach, and since then Ryan Howard has also adopted it. Thome credits his calm demeanor to his role model during his early playing years, Eddie Murray, once commenting,

"Eddie taught me to play the game exactly the same when you fail and when you succeed. Hit a home run, hey, enjoy the moment, but then let it go. If you strike out with the bases loaded, same thing, let it go. I don't smash helmets when I strike out, because it's not the helmet's fault, it's my fault."

=== Personality ===
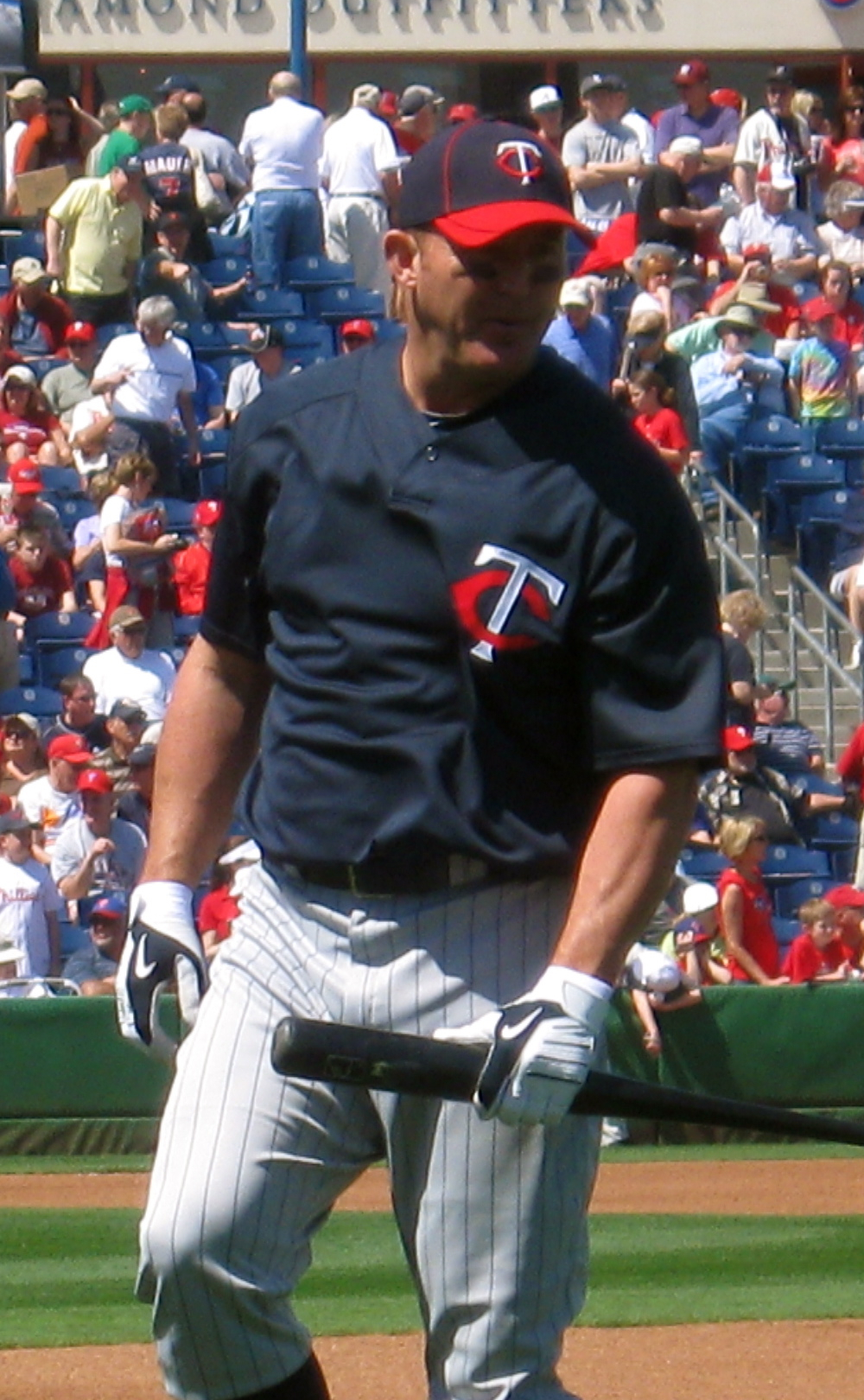
Thome in 2010

Thome's friendly personality has been the subject of much attention. In a 2007 poll of 464 MLB players, he tied with Mike Sweeney for second-friendliest player, behind Sean Casey. After Thome hit his 600th home run, Twins closer Joe Nathan said, "He is the world's nicest man." Teammate Michael Cuddyer added, "He is the nicest, gentlest, kindest guy you will ever meet ... to everything except the baseball, he still hits that really hard." His kindness comes up in conversations with many MLB players. When he signed with the Phillies in the offseason before the 2012 season, Phillies general manager Rubén Amaro Jr. cited Thome's constant positive attitude as a main reason for his signing. As an exercise in remaining humble, he annually visited his high school prior to spring training. A Sports Illustrated article said that Thome frequently signs autographs for fans and that he is "endlessly patient with requests". In a piece for Philadelphia magazine discussing Thome's Baseball Hall of Fame prospects, sportswriter Stephen Silver wrote,

"It's not just the numbers. Thanks to his gregarious personality, Thome is the rare athlete who played in several cities and was beloved everywhere he went. I saw the Twins and Phillies play each other in Philadelphia when Thome was with the Twins, and the same two teams in Minnesota two years later when Thome was a Phillie, and the opposing crowd cheered Thome both times, even when he hit home runs for the road team. Thome was similarly loved in his long stints in Cleveland and Chicago, as well as shorter runs in Los Angeles and Baltimore."

A fan poll in The Plain Dealer in 2003 named him the most popular athlete in Cleveland sports history.

=== Career legacy ===
Despite his injuries throughout his later years, Thome totaled, according to Fangraphs, 71.6 Wins Above Replacement (WAR), a sabermetrics baseball statistic intended to quantify a player's total contributions to a team. He was one of few players whose prime was during the steroid era and who was not suspected of using steroids; Thome adamantly denies ever using performance-enhancing drugs. Soon after the announcement of his front office position (which signified the end of his playing career), writers began to speculate as to whether Thome would make it to the Baseball Hall of Fame, and more specifically, whether he would gain entrance in his first year of eligibility in 2018. Writers also questioned whether Thome's candidacy would be hindered by his lack of self-promotion and others' tendency to overlook him.

== Personal life ==
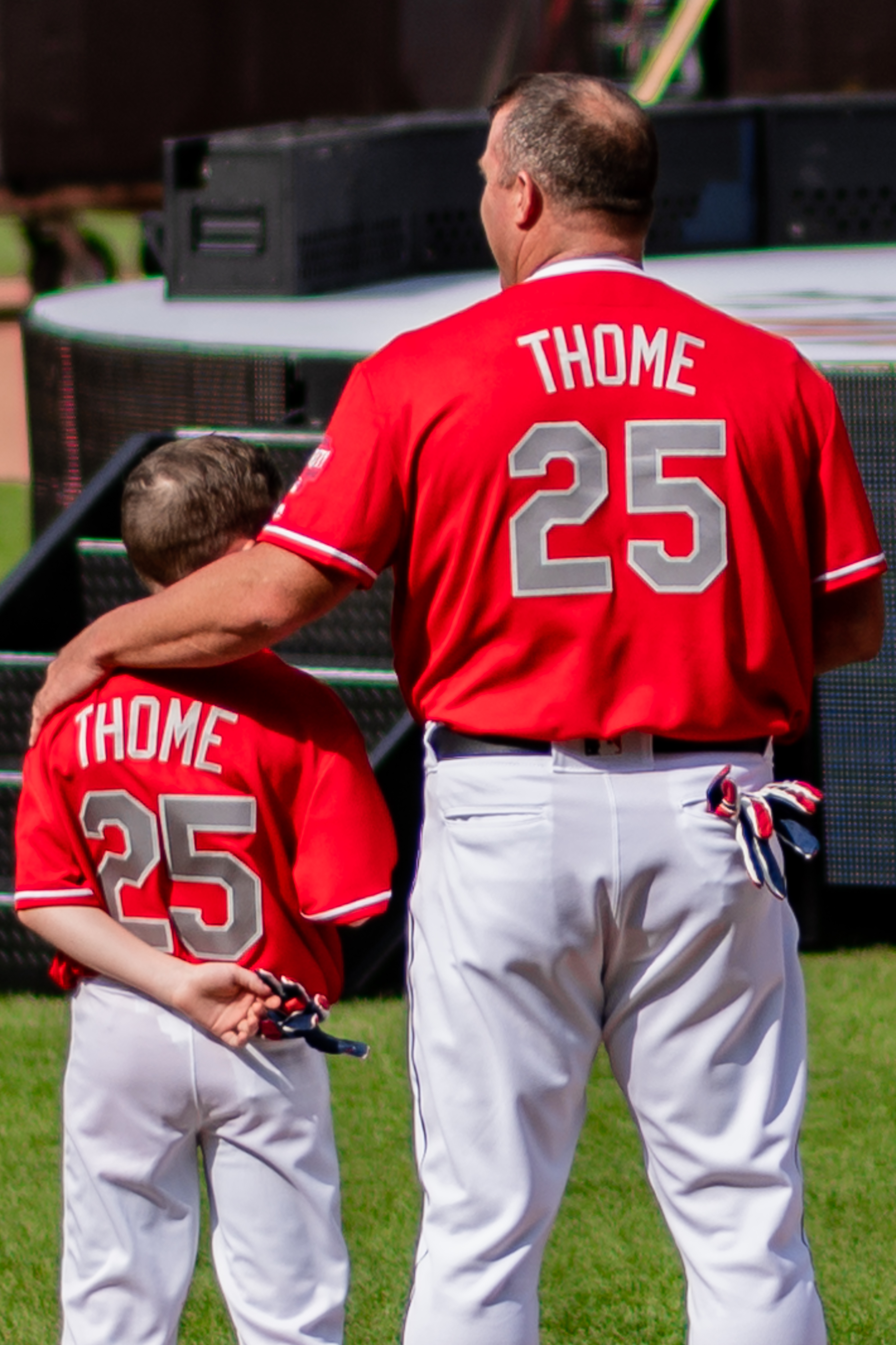
Thome (right) with son Landon at the 2019 All-Star Legends & Celebrity Softball Game

Thome and his wife, Andrea, have two children, Lila Grace and Landon. He has also established funds to put his 10 nieces and nephews through college. During the offseason he lives in Burr Ridge, Illinois. ESPN's SportsCenter reported that shortly after his nephew, Brandon, was paralyzed in an accident, he asked Thome to hit a home run for him; Thome obliged, hitting two in the subsequent game. Thome is also a philanthropist and provided help to the communities surrounding the teams for which he played. In recognition of his community involvement, he was given the Marvin Miller Man of the Year Award in 2001 and 2004, and the Lou Gehrig Memorial Award in 2004. In 2013, after the November 17, 2013, tornado outbreak struck Washington, Illinois, just 15 miles (24 km) from his hometown, he and his wife pledged to donate $100,000 to relief efforts. Among the philanthropic endeavors Thome and his wife heavily support are Children's Home + Aid, which strives to help underprivileged children predominantly with finding care (e.g., foster care, adoption, etc.), and an annual benefit to raise money for the Children's Hospital of Illinois, continuing a tradition his mother started years ago. Moreover, the Thomes try "to stay connected with at least one or two organizations in each of the cities" that Thome has played.

In 2019, a renovated youth baseball field in Cleveland was named the 'Jim Thome All-Star Complex' in his honor.

In the 2026 MLB Draft, his son Landon was drafted 34th overall by the Chicago White Sox.

== See also ==
- List of Major League Baseball career hits leaders
- List of Major League Baseball career runs-batted-in leaders
- List of Major League Baseball career runs scored leaders
- List of Major League Baseball career total bases leaders
- List of Major League Baseball career bases on balls leaders
- List of Major League Baseball home run records
- List of Major League Baseball progressive career home runs leaders

Preceded by Mike Sweeney	American League Player of the Month; July 2001	Succeeded by Jermaine Dye
Preceded by Vladimir Guerrero; Lance Berkman	National League Player of the Month; September 2003; June 2004	Succeeded by Barry Bonds; Jim Edmonds
Preceded by Award created Ken Ramos	Indians' Minor League Player of the Year (The Lou Boudreau Award); 1990; 1993	Succeeded by Manny Ramirez; David Bell
