= Landon Thome =

American baseball player (born 2007)

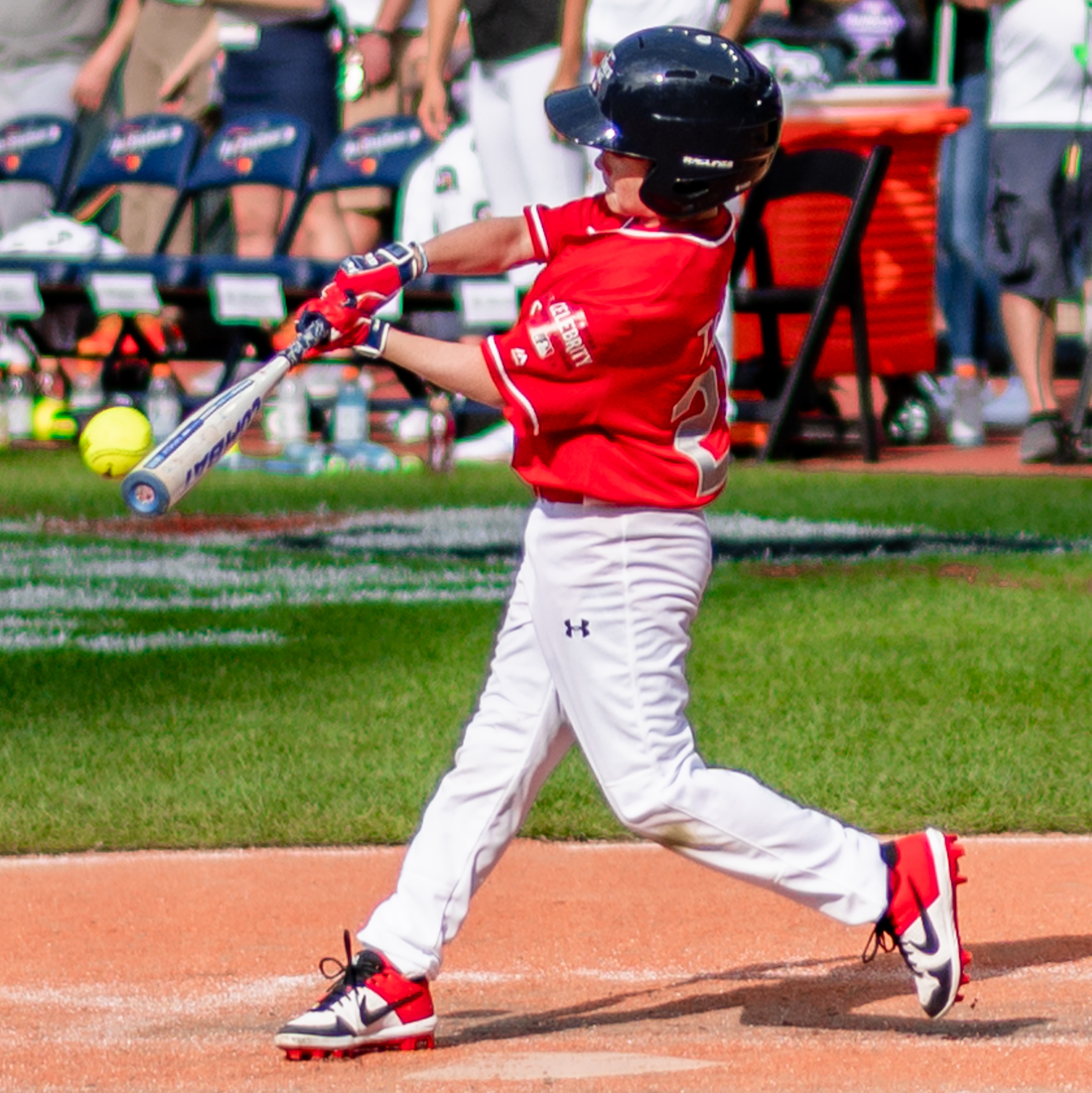
- Thome playing in the 2019 All-Star Legends & Celebrity Softball Game

Chicago White Sox
- Shortstop
- Born: November 16, 2007 (age 18); Hinsdale, Illinois, U.S.
- Bats: Left Throws: Right
- Stats at Baseball Reference

Landon Thome (born November 16, 2007) is an American professional baseball shortstop in the Chicago White Sox organization.

== Amateur career ==
Thome attended Nazareth Academy in La Grange Park, Illinois, a southwestern suburb of Chicago. He was teammates with Jaden Fauske. As a senior in 2026, he had a .535 batting average with seven home runs, 29 runs batted in (RBI) and 49 stolen bases in 50 attempts. He was named the Illinois Gatorade Baseball Player of the Year. For his career, he batted .422 with 18 home runs, 117 RBI and 108 stolen bases over 155 games. He committed to play college baseball at Florida State University.

== Professional career ==
Thome was selected by the Chicago White Sox with the 34th overall pick in the 2026 Major League Baseball draft. He signed with the team for a $2.5 million signing bonus.

== Personal life ==
Thome is the son of MLB Hall of Fame member Jim Thome.
