= 1966 Major League Baseball draft =

Baseball draft of amateur players

Overview
- First selection: Steve Chilcott; New York Mets
- First round selections: 20
- Hall of Famers: 1: OF Reggie Jackson

The 1966 Major League Baseball draft took place on 7 June, early in the 1966 MLB season. The draft saw the New York Mets take Steve Chilcott 1st overall pick, with future Hall of Famer Reggie Jackson drafted second.

== First round selections ==
= All-Star	= Baseball Hall of Famer

The following are the first-round picks in the 1966 Major League Baseball draft.

Pick	Player	Team	Position	Hometown/School
1	Steve Chilcott	New York Mets	Catcher	Lancaster, California
2	Reggie Jackson	Kansas City Athletics	Outfielder	Arizona State
3	Wayne Twitchell	Houston Astros	Right-Handed Pitcher	Portland, Oregon
4	Ken Brett	Boston Red Sox	Left-Handed Pitcher	El Segundo, California
5	Dean Burk	Chicago Cubs	Right-Handed Pitcher	Highland, Illinois
6	Tom Grieve	Washington Senators	Outfielder	Pittsfield, Massachusetts
7	Leron Lee	St. Louis Cardinals	Outfielder	Sacramento, California
8	Jim DeNeff	California Angels	Shortstop	Indiana University
9	Mike Biko	Philadelphia Phillies	Right-Handed Pitcher	Dallas, Texas
10	Jim Lyttle	New York Yankees	Outfielder	Florida State
11	Al Santorini	Atlanta Braves	Right-Handed Pitcher	Union, New Jersey
12	* John Curtis	Cleveland Indians	Left-Handed Pitcher	Smithtown, New York
13	Gary Nolan	Cincinnati Reds	Right-Handed Pitcher	Oroville, California
14	* Rick Konik	Detroit Tigers	First baseman	Detroit, Michigan
15	Richie Hebner	Pittsburgh Pirates	Shortstop	Norwood, Massachusetts
16	Ted Parks	Baltimore Orioles	Shortstop	University of California
17	Bob Reynolds	San Francisco Giants	Right-Handed Pitcher	Seattle, WA
18	Carlos May	Chicago White Sox	Outfielder	Birmingham, AL
19	Larry Hutton	Los Angeles Dodgers	Right-Handed Pitcher	Greenfield, Indiana
20	Bob Jones	Minnesota Twins	Third baseman	Dawson, Georgia

* Did not sign

== Other notable selections ==
= All-Star

Round	Pick	Player	Team	Position
2	38	Johnny Oates*	Chicago White Sox	Catcher
3	47	Clay Kirby	St. Louis Cardinals	Pitcher
3	60	Steve Garvey*	Minnesota Twins	Third baseman
5	83	Cliff Johnson	Houston Astros	Catcher
5	95	Dave Cash	Pittsburgh Pirates	Shortstop
6	115	Gene Clines	Pittsburgh Pirates	Second baseman/Outfielder
8	159	Charlie Hough	Los Angeles Dodgers	Pitcher
9	168	Ken Forsch*	California Angels	Pitcher
9	179	Bill Russell	Los Angeles Dodgers	Outfielder
10	190	Ken Stabler*	New York Yankees	Pitcher
15	299	Ted Sizemore	Los Angeles Dodgers	Catcher
19	361	Ron Cey*	New York Mets	Third baseman
20	388	Dave LaRoche	California Angels	Pitcher
28	540	Mike Martin	New York Mets	Outfielder
31	595	Bill Stoneman	Chicago Cubs	Pitcher
31	598	Bill Bonham*	California Angels	Pitcher
32	609	Kurt Bevacqua*	New York Mets	Second baseman

* Did not sign

== Notes ==
Preceded by Rick Monday	1st Overall Picks; Steve Chilcott	Succeeded by Ron Blomberg
