= Steve Chilcott =

American baseball player (born 1948)

Steven Chilcott
- Catcher
- Born: September 23, 1948 (age 77); Lancaster, California, U.S.
- Bats: Left Throws: Right
- Stats at Baseball Reference

Steven Lynn Chilcott (born September 23, 1948) is an American former professional baseball player. He played in minor league baseball as a catcher from 1966 to 1972. Chilcott was chosen as the first overall selection in the 1966 Major League Baseball draft, by the New York Mets. He is one of three players to be drafted first overall in the Major League Baseball draft and never play in the major leagues, along with Brien Taylor and Brady Aiken.

== Early life ==
Born in Lancaster, California, Chilcott attended Antelope Valley High School.

== Athletic career ==
After graduating high school, Chilcott was chosen as the first overall pick by the New York Mets in the 1966 Major League Baseball Draft, one spot ahead of future Hall of Famer Reggie Jackson. In 1967, during his second season in the minor leagues, he injured his shoulder while playing for the Winter Haven Mets in the Florida State League. After reaching second base as a baserunner, he dove back toward the base when the pitcher tried to pick him off. He slammed into the base bag with full force on his right arm, dislocating his shoulder and ending his season.

Chilcott was plagued by injuries throughout the rest of his baseball career. The Mets released him in 1971, and he signed with the New York Yankees. However, he was released after playing only 24 games in 1972, and retired at age 24. Chilcott never played higher than Triple-A, and is one of only three retired number-one picks to have never appeared in a major league game.

== Post-athletic career ==
Chilcott then began a career as a firefighter in the mid-1970s, working as a temporary in the Santa Barbara Fire Department. He later became a full-time contractor, constructing and remodeling homes.

Preceded by Rick Monday	First overall pick in the MLB Entry Draft; 1966	Succeeded by Ron Blomberg
