= 1966 Philadelphia Phillies season =

1966 Philadelphia Phillies
- League: National League
- Ballpark: Connie Mack Stadium
- City: Philadelphia
- Record: 87–75 (.537)
- League place: 4th
- Owners: R. R. M. Carpenter, Jr.
- General managers: John J. Quinn
- Managers: Gene Mauch
- Television: WFIL
- Radio: WFIL (By Saam, Bill Campbell, Richie Ashburn)

The 1966 Philadelphia Phillies season was the 84th season in the history of the franchise, and the 29th season for the Philadelphia Phillies at Connie Mack Stadium. The Phillies had a winning record of 87–75. Over the course of the campaign, they held winning records against two of their biggest regional rivals, the Pittsburgh Pirates (10–8) and New York Mets (11–7), respectively. Philadelphia had the fourth-highest winning percentage in the National League (NL) that year. The Phillies were owned by R. R. M. "Bob" Carpenter, Jr., with the Phillies playing home games in Connie Mack Stadium, as they had since 1938.

In the off-season, the Phillies purchased, sold, and traded several players. Among those purchased by other teams was Mike Marshall, sold to the Detroit Tigers on April 11, 1966. Throughout its history, players could be added to the team in several ways, including advancement to the parent club through the farm system. The primary farm teams were the Triple-A San Diego Padres and Double-A Macon Peaches. Phillies farm system players who made their MLB debut with the 1966 squad are pitchers John Morris and Joe Verbanic, and infielder Gary Sutherland.

== Regular season ==
=== Season standings ===
National League
Team	W	L	Pct.	GB	Home	Road
Los Angeles Dodgers	95	67	.586	—	53‍–‍28	42‍–‍39
San Francisco Giants	93	68	.578	1½	47‍–‍34	46‍–‍34
Pittsburgh Pirates	92	70	.568	3	46‍–‍35	46‍–‍35
Philadelphia Phillies	87	75	.537	8	48‍–‍33	39‍–‍42
Atlanta Braves	85	77	.525	10	43‍–‍38	42‍–‍39
St. Louis Cardinals	83	79	.512	12	43‍–‍38	40‍–‍41
Cincinnati Reds	76	84	.475	18	46‍–‍33	30‍–‍51
Houston Astros	72	90	.444	23	45‍–‍36	27‍–‍54
New York Mets	66	95	.410	28½	32‍–‍49	34‍–‍46
Chicago Cubs	59	103	.364	36	32‍–‍49	27‍–‍54

=== Record vs. Opponents ===
1966 National League record Sources:
Team	ATL	CHC	CIN	HOU	LAD	NYM	PHI	PIT	SF	STL
Atlanta	—	7–11	10–8	14–4–1	7–11	14–4	11–7	7–11	8–10	7–11
Chicago	11–7	—	6–12	5–13	8–10	8–10	5–13	6–12	6–12	4–14
Cincinnati	8–10	12–6	—	4–14	6–12	10–7	10–8	8–10	7–10	11–7
Houston	4–14–1	13–5	14–4	—	7–11	7–11	7–11	4–14	6–12	10–8
Los Angeles	11–7	10–8	12–6	11–7	—	12–6	11–7	9–9	9–9	10–8
New York	4–14	10–8	7–10	11–7	6–12	—	7–11	5–13	9–9	7–11
Philadelphia	7–11	13–5	8–10	11–7	7–11	11–7	—	10–8	10–8	10–8
Pittsburgh	11–7	12–6	10–8	14–4	9–9	13–5	8–10	—	7–11	8–10
San Francisco	10–8	12–6	10–7	12–6	9–9	9–9	8–10	11–7	—	12–6
St. Louis	11–7	14–4	7–11	8–10	8–10	11–7	8–10	10–8	6–12	—

=== Notable Transactions ===
- October 27, 1965: Pat Corrales, Art Mahaffey, and Alex Johnson were traded by the Phillies to the St. Louis Cardinals for Dick Groat, Bob Uecker, and Bill White.
- November 29, 1965: Rubén Amaro was traded by the Phillies to the New York Yankees for Phil Linz.
- November 29, 1965: Rich Barry was drafted by the Phillies from the New York Yankees in the 1965 minor league draft.
- December 6, 1965: Jack Baldschun was traded by the Phillies to the Baltimore Orioles for Darold Knowles and Jackie Brandt.
- January 10, 1966: Wes Covington was traded by the Phillies to the Chicago Cubs for Doug Clemens.
- January 29, 1966: Lowell Palmer was drafted by the Phillies in the 1st round (6th pick) of the secondary phase of the 1966 Major League Baseball draft. Player signed February 1, 1966.
- April 11, 1966: Mike Marshall was purchased from the Phillies by the Detroit Tigers.
- April 21, 1966: Ferguson Jenkins, John Herrnstein, and Adolfo Phillips were traded by the Phillies to the Chicago Cubs for Larry Jackson and Bob Buhl.
- June 22, 1966: Norm Gigon was traded by the Phillies to the Chicago Cubs for Billy Cowan.

=== Game log ===
Legend
	Phillies win
	Phillies loss
	Postponement
**Bold**	Phillies team member

1966 Game Log
Overall Record: 87–75
April (8–5)

#	Date	Opponent	Score	Win	Loss	Save	Attendance	Record
–	April 12	@ Cardinals	Postponed (rain); Makeup: June 19 as a traditional double-header					
1	April 13	@ Cardinals	3–2 (12)	**Roger Craig** (1–0)	Dennis Aust (0–1)	**Ray Culp** (1)	8,219	1–0
2	April 14	@ Cardinals	5–4	**Darold Knowles** (1–0)	Larry Jaster (0–1)	None	7,223	2–0
3	April 15	Reds	4–3	**Roger Craig** (2–0)	Jack Baldschun (0–1)	None	29,007	3–0
4	April 16	Reds	0–4	Jim Maloney (1–0)	**Ray Culp** (0–1)	None	6,298	3–1
5	April 17	Reds	3–1	**Chris Short** (1–0)	Joe Nuxhall (0–1)	None	13,852	4–1
–	April 18	Braves	Postponed (rain); Makeup: June 13 as a traditional double-header					
6	April 19	Braves	1–3	Clay Carroll (1–0)	**Jim Bunning** (0–1)	None	7,476	4–2
7	April 20	Braves	1–8	Ken Johnson (1–1)	**Ray Culp** (0–2)	None	6,855	4–3
8	April 21	Braves	4–5	Phil Niekro (1–0)	**Chris Short** (1–1)	None	5,744	4–4
9	April 22	@ Reds	9–7	**Darold Knowles** (2–0)	Don Nottebart (0–1)	**Bob Buhl** (1)	10,266	5–4
–	April 23	@ Reds	Postponed (wet grounds and rain); Makeup: June 15 as a traditional double-header					
10	April 24 (1)	@ Reds	2–3 (6)	Sammy Ellis (1–1)	**Ray Culp** (0–3)	None	7,248	5–5
–	April 24 (2)	@ Reds	Postponed (rain); Makeup: August 27 as a traditional double-header					
11	April 25	@ Pirates	5–0	**Jim Bunning** (1–1)	Bob Veale (1–1)	None	9,564	6–5
–	April 27	Mets	Postponed (rain); Makeup: July 7					
12	April 29	@ Cubs	5–1	**Jim Bunning** (2–1)	Dick Ellsworth (0–2)	None	4,053	7–5
13	April 30	@ Cubs	12–0	**Chris Short** (2–1)	Ken Holtzman (1–1)	None	4,495	8–5

May (14–15)

#	Date	Opponent	Score	Win	Loss	Save	Attendance	Record
14	May 1	@ Cubs	1–6	Bill Faul (1–0)	**Larry Jackson** (0–3)	None	7,783	8–6
15	May 3	@ Braves	8–9 (10)	Phil Niekro (2–1)	**Ray Herbert** (0–1)	None	10,485	8–7
16	May 4	@ Braves	2–1	**Chris Short** (3–1)	Ken Johnson (2–2)	None	11,588	9–7
17	May 5	@ Braves	3–4	Chi-Chi Olivo (1–0)	**Gary Wagner** (0–1)	Billy O'Dell (4)	11,236	9–8
18	May 6	Pirates	8–7 (11)	**Darold Knowles** (3–0)	Roy Face (3–1)	None	18,982	10–8
19	May 7	Pirates	7–3	**Jim Bunning** (3–1)	Tommie Sisk (1–1)	None	7,006	11–8
20	May 8	Pirates	2–3	Bob Veale (3–1)	**Ray Herbert** (0–2)	None	8,411	11–9
–	May 9	Dodgers	Postponed (cold weather); Makeup: July 17 as a traditional double-header					
21	May 10	Dodgers	1–6	Sandy Koufax (4–1)	**Chris Short** (3–2)	None	14,895	11–10
22	May 11	Dodgers	0–5	Don Sutton (4–3)	**Larry Jackson** (0–4)	None	11,756	11–11
23	May 12	Dodgers	5–1	**Jim Bunning** (4–1)	Don Drysdale (2–4)	**Darold Knowles** (1)	10,205	12–11
24	May 13	Astros	0–1	Turk Farrell (1–1)	**Chris Short** (3–3)	Claude Raymond (3)	10,559	12–12
25	May 14	Astros	5–6 (11)	Don Lee (1–0)	**Terry Fox** (0–2)	Claude Raymond (4)	3,957	12–13
26	May 15	Astros	5–2	**Larry Jackson** (1–4)	Barry Latman (2–3)	**Jim Bunning** (1)	9,208	13–13
27	May 17	Cardinals	5–3	**Chris Short** (4–3)	Nelson Briles (0–2)	None	8,731	14–13
28	May 18	Cardinals	4–3	**Ray Culp** (1–3)	Bob Gibson (3–5)	None	11,169	15–13
29	May 19	Cardinals	0–2	Al Jackson (3–1)	**Larry Jackson** (1–5)	Joe Hoerner (1)	8,972	15–14
30	May 20	@ Astros	6–5 (10)	**Darold Knowles** (4–0)	Jim Owens (3–2)	None	29,763	16–14
31	May 21	@ Astros	3–4 (11)	Don Lee (2–0)	**Bob Buhl** (0–1)	None	30,229	16–15
32	May 22	@ Astros	6–1	**Jim Bunning** (5–1)	Barry Latman (2–4)	None	20,991	17–15
33	May 23	@ Astros	9–0	**Larry Jackson** (2–5)	Dave Giusti (4–3)	None	12,384	18–15
34	May 24	@ Dodgers	2–3	Don Sutton (6–4)	**Bob Buhl** (0–2)	Ron Perranoski (3)	20,286	18–16
35	May 25	@ Dodgers	1–2	Don Drysdale (3–4)	**Chris Short** (4–4)	None	19,572	18–17
36	May 26	@ Giants	0–1 (14)	Juan Marichal (9–0)	**Darold Knowles** (4–1)	None	7,529	18–18
37	May 27	@ Giants	9–2	**Larry Jackson** (3–5)	Ray Sadecki (2–3)	None	16,063	19–18
38	May 28	@ Giants	2–0	**Ray Culp** (2–3)	Joe Gibbon (2–2)	**Darold Knowles** (2)	17,331	20–18
39	May 29	@ Giants	5–6 (10)	Lindy McDaniel (3–2)	**Bo Belinsky** (0–1)	None	25,237	20–19
40	May 30 (1)	@ Mets	7–2	**Jim Bunning** (6–1)	Gordie Richardson (0–2)	None	see 2nd game	21–19
41	May 30 (2)	@ Mets	1–3	Jack Fisher (2–5)	**Bob Buhl** (0–3)	None	46,882	21–20
42	May 31	@ Mets	6–4	**Ray Herbert** (1–2)	Larry Bearnarth (1–2)	**Darold Knowles** (3)	9,946	22–20

June (18–14)

#	Date	Opponent	Score	Win	Loss	Save	Attendance	Record
43	June 1 (1)	Cubs	4–3	**Terry Fox** (1–2)	Chuck Estrada (1–1)	**Darold Knowles** (4)	see 2nd game	23–20
44	June 1 (2)	Cubs	7–4	**Bob Buhl** (1–3)	Bob Hendley (1–2)	None	12,330	24–20
45	June 2	Cubs	5–4	**Darold Knowles** (5–1)	Ferguson Jenkins (1–1)	None	6,010	25–20
46	June 3	Giants	6–1	**Jim Bunning** (7–1)	Ray Sadecki (3–4)	None	27,759	26–20
47	June 4	Giants	6–1	**Chris Short** (5–4)	Juan Marichal (10–1)	None	36,494	27–20
48	June 5	Giants	6–7 (10)	Frank Linzy (2–2)	**Bo Belinsky** (0–2)	None	22,587	27–21
49	June 6	Giants	6–2	**Rick Wise** (1–0)	Bobby Bolin (4–4)	None	19,200	28–21
50	June 7	Reds	5–1	**Jim Bunning** (8–1)	Milt Pappas (4–4)	None	12,422	29–21
51	June 8	Reds	10–6	**Chris Short** (6–4)	Sammy Ellis (2–9)	**Darold Knowles** (5)	14,637	30–21
52	June 9	Reds	0–1	Joey Jay (6–2)	**Bob Buhl** (1–4)	None	13,566	30–22
53	June 10	Cardinals	0–1	Curt Simmons (1–1)	**Rick Wise** (1–1)	Joe Hoerner (3)	17,693	30–23
54	June 11	Cardinals	0–2	Bob Gibson (8–6)	**Jim Bunning** (8–2)	None	20,895	30–24
55	June 12	Cardinals	5–3	**Chris Short** (7–4)	Nelson Briles (1–4)	None	13,421	31–24
56	June 13 (1)	Braves	6–2	**Larry Jackson** (4–5)	Tony Cloninger (5–7)	None	see 2nd game	32–24
57	June 13 (2)	Braves	6–4	**Bob Buhl** (2–4)	Wade Blasingame (3–5)	**Terry Fox** (2)	21,642	33–24
58	June 14	Braves	6–11	Ken Johnson (5–5)	**Rick Wise** (1–2)	Chi-Chi Olivo (5)	16,759	33–25
59	June 15 (1)	@ Reds	6–7	Billy McCool (3–3)	**Ed Roebuck** (0–1)	None	see 2nd game	33–26
60	June 15 (2)	@ Reds	6–9	Don Nottebart (1–1)	**Ed Roebuck** (0–2)	None	9,538	33–27
61	June 16	@ Reds	12–5	**Chris Short** (8–4)	Sammy Ellis (2–11)	None	6,359	34–27
62	June 17	@ Cardinals	6–5	**Darold Knowles** (6–1)	Don Dennis (2–1)	None	23,965	35–27
63	June 18	@ Cardinals	2–3	Al Jackson (6–5)	**Roger Craig** (2–1)	None	36,932	35–28
64	June 19 (1)	@ Cardinals	0–1	Ray Washburn (4–3)	**Jim Bunning** (8–3)	None	see 2nd game	35–29
65	June 19 (2)	@ Cardinals	1–5	Bob Gibson (10–6)	**Rick Wise** (1–3)	None	44,940	35–30
66	June 20	@ Braves	5–7	Tony Cloninger (7–7)	**Terry Fox** (1–3)	None	16,790	35–31
67	June 21	@ Braves	1–4	Denny Lemaster (5–4)	**Larry Jackson** (4–6)	None	11,649	35–32
68	June 22	@ Braves	7–3	**Bob Buhl** (3–4)	Joey Jay (6–3)	None	12,544	36–32
69	June 24	Pirates	1–3	Bob Veale (8–5)	**Jim Bunning** (8–4)	None	26,791	36–33
70	June 25	Pirates	8–7	**Ray Culp** (3–3)	Pete Mikkelsen (5–4)	**Roger Craig** (1)	23,160	37–33
71	June 26	Pirates	0–2	Woodie Fryman (5–3)	**Larry Jackson** (4–7)	None	18,734	37–34
72	June 28	@ Mets	1–0	**Jim Bunning** (9–4)	Bob Friend (2–5)	None	22,693	38–34
73	June 29	@ Mets	5–2	**Bob Buhl** (4–4)	Rob Gardner (2–6)	**Darold Knowles** (6)	13,918	39–34
74	June 30	@ Mets	1–0	**Chris Short** (9–4)	Bob Shaw (5–5)	None	19,895	40–34

July (15–15)

#	Date	Opponent	Score	Win	Loss	Save	Attendance	Record
75	July 1	Cubs	7–0	**Larry Jackson** (5–7)	Bill Faul (1–3)	None	10,670	41–34
76	July 2	Cubs	12–9	**Rick Wise** (2–3)	Dick Ellsworth (3–11)	**Ray Herbert** (1)	4,251	42–34
77	July 3	Cubs	6–2	**Bob Buhl** (5–4)	Curt Simmons (2–2)	**Darold Knowles** (7)	5,058	43–34
78	July 4 (1)	Mets	6–9	Bob Shaw (6–5)	**Chris Short** (9–5)	Jack Hamilton (7)	see 2nd game	43–35
79	July 4 (2)	Mets	1–8	Jack Fisher (6–8)	**Ray Culp** (3–4)	None	19,208	43–36
80	July 5	Mets	3–1	**Larry Jackson** (6–7)	Bill Hepler (1–1)	None	8,047	44–36
81	July 6	Mets	5–7	Darrell Sutherland (1–0)	**Darold Knowles** (6–2)	Jack Hamilton (8)	12,469	44–37
82	July 7	Mets	6–9	Gerry Arrigo (2–1)	**Ray Herbert** (1–3)	None	7,447	44–38
83	July 8	@ Cubs	5–4	**Chris Short** (10–5)	Ken Holtzman (3–9)	**Darold Knowles** (8)	5,166	45–38
84	July 9	@ Cubs	11–6	**Larry Jackson** (7–7)	Bill Hands (5–8)	**Darold Knowles** (9)	7,193	46–38
85	July 10	@ Cubs	2–10	Dick Ellsworth (4–12)	**Jim Bunning** (9–5)	None	13,863	46–39
–	July 12	**1966 Major League Baseball All-Star Game at Busch Memorial Stadium in St. Louis**						
86	July 14	Giants	5–0	**Larry Jackson** (8–7)	Gaylord Perry (12–2)	None	24,347	47–39
87	July 15	Giants	1–8	Juan Marichal (15–4)	**Jim Bunning** (9–6)	None	29,966	47–40
88	July 16	Giants	6–5 (15)	**Terry Fox** (2–3)	Joe Gibbon (3–6)	None	14,484	48–40
89	July 17 (1)	Dodgers	3–0	**Chris Short** (11–5)	Joe Moeller (0–2)	None	see 2nd game	49–40
90	July 17 (2)	Dodgers	1–3	Claude Osteen (12–7)	**Ray Herbert** (1–4)	Phil Regan (11)	31,832	49–41
91	July 18	Dodgers	4–0	**Larry Jackson** (9–7)	Sandy Koufax (16–5)	None	34,755	50–41
92	July 19	@ Astros	2–8	Turk Farrell (4–6)	**Jim Bunning** (9–7)	None	27,648	50–42
93	July 20	@ Astros	13–9	**Ray Herbert** (2–4)	Don Arlich (0–1)	**Darold Knowles** (10)	27,266	51–42
94	July 21	@ Astros	2–3	Dave Giusti (10–7)	**Chris Short** (11–6)	Mike Cuellar (2)	20,002	51–43
95	July 22	@ Giants	1–4	Gaylord Perry (14–2)	**Larry Jackson** (9–8)	None	23,420	51–44
96	July 23	@ Giants	8–0	**Jim Bunning** (10–7)	Bobby Bolin (5–6)	None	23,846	52–44
97	July 24	@ Giants	1–4	Ron Herbel (4–3)	**Bob Buhl** (5–5)	Frank Linzy (11)	30,835	52–45
98	July 25	@ Dodgers	3–6	Ron Perranoski (3–4)	**Darold Knowles** (6–3)	None	24,184	52–46
99	July 26	@ Dodgers	2–3	Ron Perranoski (4–4)	**Larry Jackson** (9–9)	None	54,365	52–47
100	July 27	@ Dodgers	1–2 (12)	Phil Regan (8–1)	**Darold Knowles** (6–4)	None	44,937	52–48
101	July 29	@ Pirates	3–5	Billy O'Dell (4–3)	**Chris Short** (11–7)	Roy Face (16)	25,358	52–49
102	July 30	@ Pirates	4–1	**Larry Jackson** (10–9)	Woodie Fryman (8–6)	None	15,804	53–49
103	July 31 (1)	@ Pirates	8–1	**Jim Bunning** (11–7)	Vern Law (6–5)	None	see 2nd game	54–49
104	July 31 (2)	@ Pirates	6–5 (10)	**Joe Verbanic** (1–0)	Roy Face (4–4)	**Ray Herbert** (2)	28,947	55–49

August (16–15)

#	Date	Opponent	Score	Win	Loss	Save	Attendance	Record
105	August 1	Astros	6–5 (10)	**Terry Fox** (3–3)	Jim Owens (4–6)	None	11,602	56–49
106	August 2	Astros	4–3	**Rick Wise** (3–3)	Barry Latman (2–6)	**Terry Fox** (3)	10,949	57–49
107	August 3	Astros	7–6	**Larry Jackson** (11–9)	Carroll Sembera (0–2)	**Darold Knowles** (11)	14,918	58–49
108	August 4	Astros	12–2	**Jim Bunning** (12–7)	Dave Giusti (11–9)	None	15,389	59–49
109	August 5	Braves	2–9	Dick Kelley (1–2)	**Joe Verbanic** (1–1)	Ted Abernathy (8)	22,520	59–50
110	August 6	Braves	6–5	**Chris Short** (12–7)	Clay Carroll (4–4)	**Darold Knowles** (12)	24,330	60–50
111	August 7	Braves	0–3	Tony Cloninger (10–7)	**Larry Jackson** (11–10)	None	14,582	60–51
112	August 9	@ Cardinals	2–3	Larry Jaster (7–3)	**Jim Bunning** (12–8)	Nelson Briles (5)	26,191	60–52
113	August 10	@ Cardinals	5–1	**Chris Short** (13–7)	Steve Carlton (1–1)	None	23,090	61–52
114	August 11	@ Cardinals	1–5	Al Jackson (12–9)	**Larry Jackson** (11–11)	None	22,404	61–53
–	August 12	@ Braves	Postponed (rain); Makeup: August 13 as a traditional double-header					
115	August 13 (1)	@ Braves	4–2	**Jim Bunning** (13–8)	Ken Johnson (9–8)	**Darold Knowles** (13)	see 2nd game	62–53
116	August 13 (2)	@ Braves	7–4	**Ray Culp** (4–4)	Pat Jarvis (0–1)	**Terry Fox** (4)	27,770	63–53
117	August 14	@ Braves	1–7	Denny Lemaster (11–8)	**Bob Buhl** (5–6)	None	16,855	63–54
118	August 15	Cubs	11–5	**Chris Short** (14–7)	Bill Hands (8–11)	**Terry Fox** (5)	7,627	64–54
119	August 16	Cubs	5–3	**Larry Jackson** (12–11)	Ferguson Jenkins (2–6)	None	11,321	65–54
120	August 17	Cubs	3–5 (10)	Curt Simmons (4–3)	**Bob Buhl** (5–7)	None	9,954	65–55
121	August 19	Mets	5–4 (10)	**John Morris** (1–0)	Bob Friend (5–8)	None	17,462	66–55
122	August 20	Mets	5–4 (11)	**Ray Culp** (5–4)	Dick Selma (3–4)	None	7,643	67–55
123	August 21 (1)	Mets	5–6	Bill Hepler (3–2)	**Rick Wise** (3–4)	Jack Hamilton (12)	see 2nd game	67–56
124	August 21 (2)	Mets	1–5	Tug McGraw (2–5)	**Jim Bunning** (13–9)	None	36,625	67–57
125	August 22	@ Pirates	5–6	Don Cardwell (6–6)	**Bob Buhl** (5–8)	Pete Mikkelsen (10)	15,119	67–58
126	August 23	@ Pirates	5–4	**Chris Short** (15–7)	Billy O'Dell (4–4)	None	25,504	68–58
127	August 24	@ Pirates	4–6	Vern Law (9–5)	**Larry Jackson** (12–12)	None	19,899	68–59
128	August 25	@ Pirates	4–1	**Jim Bunning** (14–9)	Bob Veale (13–8)	None	25,658	69–59
129	August 26	@ Reds	0–2	Jim O'Toole (5–6)	**Rick Wise** (3–5)	Billy McCool (15)	16,203	69–60
130	August 27 (1)	@ Reds	7–14	Ted Davidson (2–1)	**Chris Short** (15–8)	None	see 2nd game	69–61
131	August 27 (2)	@ Reds	7–8	Billy McCool (8–8)	**Ray Herbert** (2–5)	None	17,966	69–62
132	August 28	@ Reds	2–5	Jim Maloney (14–4)	**Larry Jackson** (12–13)	Don Nottebart (10)	12,698	69–63
133	August 29	Giants	5–1	**Jim Bunning** (15–9)	Ray Sadecki (4–7)	None	25,994	70–63
134	August 30	Giants	1–7	Bobby Bolin (8–9)	**Rick Wise** (3–6)	Frank Linzy (16)	25,086	70–64
135	August 31	Astros	10–5	**Chris Short** (16–8)	Bob Bruce (2–11)	None	9,420	71–64

September (15–10)

#	Date	Opponent	Score	Win	Loss	Save	Attendance	Record
136	September 1	Astros	3–1	**Larry Jackson** (13–13)	Turk Farrell (6–9)	None	8,974	72–64
137	September 2	@ Mets	6–0	**Jim Bunning** (16–9)	Larry Miller (0–1)	None	24,541	73–64
138	September 3	@ Mets	8–4	**Rick Wise** (4–6)	Bob Shaw (10–12)	None	19,921	74–64
139	September 4	@ Mets	5–0	**Chris Short** (17–8)	Tug McGraw (2–7)	None	17,770	75–64
140	September 5 (1)	@ Cubs	4–5	Arnold Earley (2–1)	**Darold Knowles** (6–5)	None	see 2nd game	75–65
141	September 5 (2)	@ Cubs	7–2	**Ray Culp** (6–4)	Dick Ellsworth (5–20)	None	20,669	76–65
142	September 6	@ Cubs	2–7	Ferguson Jenkins (3–7)	**Jim Bunning** (16–10)	Bob Hendley (6)	3,218	76–66
143	September 9	Reds	7–6	**Larry Jackson** (14–13)	Milt Pappas (10–11)	None	14,866	77–66
144	September 10	Reds	1–2	Sammy Ellis (12–16)	**Jim Bunning** (16–11)	Billy McCool (18)	14,819	77–67
145	September 11	Reds	9–3	**Chris Short** (18–8)	Jim Maloney (14–7)	None	9,363	78–67
146	September 13	@ Giants	2–7	Juan Marichal (22–6)	**Larry Jackson** (14–14)	None	11,930	78–68
147	September 14	@ Giants	2–0	**Jim Bunning** (17–11)	Gaylord Perry (20–7)	None	8,328	79–68
148	September 16	@ Astros	4–6	Mike Cuellar (11–9)	**Chris Short** (18–9)	None	10,920	79–69
149	September 17	@ Astros	2–11	Larry Dierker (9–7)	**John Morris** (1–1)	None	10,291	79–70
150	September 18	@ Dodgers	4–0	**Larry Jackson** (15–14)	Claude Osteen (16–12)	None	36,183	80–70
151	September 19	@ Dodgers	1–6	Don Drysdale (11–16)	**Jim Bunning** (17–12)	None	24,900	80–71
152	September 20	@ Dodgers	1–11	Sandy Koufax (25–8)	**Chris Short** (18–10)	None	41,726	80–72
153	September 21	@ Dodgers	3–2	**Rick Wise** (5–6)	Claude Osteen (16–13)	None	35,770	81–72
154	September 23	Cardinals	5–4 (12)	**Ray Culp** (7–4)	Dick Hughes (1–1)	None	6,896	82–72
155	September 24	Cardinals	5–4	**Jim Bunning** (18–12)	Al Jackson (13–14)	None	8,186	83–72
156	September 25	Cardinals	4–3 (13)	**Bob Buhl** (6–8)	Nelson Briles (4–15)	None	4,628	84–72
157	September 26	Pirates	5–4 (11)	**Jim Bunning** (19–12)	Billy O'Dell (5–5)	None	8,289	85–72
–	September 27	Pirates	Postponed (rain); Makeup: September 28 as a traditional double-header					
158	September 28 (1)	Pirates	1–2	Steve Blass (11–6)	**Jim Bunning** (19–13)	Tommie Sisk (1)	see 2nd game	85–73
159	September 28 (2)	Pirates	2–4	Bob Veale (16–12)	**Larry Jackson** (15–15)	None	7,213	85–74
160	September 30	Dodgers	5–3	**Chris Short** (19–10)	Claude Osteen (17–14)	None	16,603	86–74

October (1–1)

#	Date	Opponent	Score	Win	Loss	Save	Attendance	Record
–	October 1	Dodgers	Postponed (rain); Makeup: October 2 as a traditional double-header					
161	October 2 (1)	Dodgers	4–3	**Chris Short** (20–10)	Bob Miller (4–2)	None	see 2nd game	87–74
162	October 2 (2)	Dodgers	3–6	Sandy Koufax (27–9)	**Jim Bunning** (19–14)	None	23,215	87–75

=== Roster ===
1966 Philadelphia Phillies
**Roster**
**Pitchers**: 33 Bo Belinsky; 19 John Boozer; 30 Bob Buhl; 14 Jim Bunning; 35 Roger Craig; 37 Ray Culp; 34,19 Terry Fox; 21 Ray Herbert; 29 Grant Jackson; 46 Larry Jackson; 30 Ferguson Jenkins; 32 Darold Knowles; 28 John Morris; 27 Steve Ridzik; 27 Ed Roebuck; 41 Chris Short; 26 Joe Verbanic; 31 Gary Wagner; 38 Rick Wise	**Catchers**: 11 Clay Dalrymple; 34 Jimmie Schaffer; 9 Bob Uecker; **Infielders**: 15 Dick Allen; 24 Dick Groat; 18 Phil Linz; 16 Cookie Rojas; 32 Gary Sutherland; 8 Tony Taylor; 10 Bill White; 7 Bobby Wine	**Outfielders**: 20 Jackie Brandt; 12 Johnny Briggs; 6 Johnny Callison; 17 Doug Clemens; 25 Tony González; 22 John Herrnstein; 22 Harvey Kuenn; 23 Adolfo Phillips	**Manager**: 4 Gene Mauch; **Coaches**: 3 Peanuts Lowrey; 2 Cal McLish; 1 George Myatt; 5 Bob Oldis

== Player stats ==
=== Batting ===
==== Starters by position ====
Note: Pos = Position; G = Games played; AB = At bats; H = Hits; Avg. = Batting average; HR = Home runs; RBI = Runs batted in

Pos	Player	G	AB	H	Avg.	HR	RBI
C	Clay Dalrymple	114	331	81	.245	4	39
1B	Bill White	159	577	159	.276	22	103
2B	Cookie Rojas	156	626	168	.268	6	55
SS	Dick Groat	155	584	152	.260	2	53
3B	Dick Allen	141	524	166	.317	40	110
LF	Tony González	132	384	110	.286	6	40
CF	Johnny Briggs	81	255	72	.282	10	23
RF	Johnny Callison	155	612	169	.276	11	55

==== Other batters ====
Note: G = Games played; AB = At bats; H = Hits; Avg. = Batting average; HR = Home runs; RBI = Runs batted in

Player	G	AB	H	Avg.	HR	RBI
Tony Taylor	125	434	105	.242	5	40
Bob Uecker	78	207	43	.208	7	30
Jackie Brandt	82	164	41	.250	1	15
Harvey Kuenn	86	159	47	.296	0	15
Doug Clemens	79	121	31	.256	1	15
Bobby Wine	46	89	21	.236	0	5
Phil Linz	40	70	14	.200	0	6
Jimmie Schaffer	8	15	2	.133	1	4
John Herrnstein	4	10	1	.100	0	1
Gary Sutherland	3	3	0	.000	0	0
Adolfo Phillips	2	3	0	.000	0	0

=== Pitching ===
==== Starting pitchers ====
Note: G = Games pitched; IP = Innings pitched; W = Wins; L = Losses; ERA = Earned run average; SO = Strikeouts

Player	G	IP	W	L	ERA	SO
Jim Bunning	43	314.0	19	14	2.41	252
Chris Short	42	272.0	20	10	3.54	177
Larry Jackson	35	247.0	15	13	2.99	107
John Boozer	2	5.1	0	0	6.75	5

==== Other pitchers ====
Note: G = Games pitched; IP = Innings pitched; W = Wins; L = Losses; ERA = Earned run average; SO = Strikeouts

Player	G	IP	W	L	ERA	SO
Bob Buhl	32	132.0	6	8	4.77	59
Ray Culp	34	110.2	7	4	5.04	100
Rick Wise	22	99.1	5	6	3.71	58
Gary Wagner	5	6.1	0	1	8.53	2

==== Relief pitchers ====
Note: G = Games pitched; W = Wins; L = Losses; SV = Saves; ERA = Earned run average; SO = Strikeouts

Player	G	W	L	SV	ERA	SO
Darold Knowles	69	6	5	13	3.05	88
Terry Fox	36	3	2	4	4.47	22
Ray Herbert	23	2	5	2	4.29	15
Joe Verbanic	17	1	1	0	5.14	7
Roger Craig	14	2	1	1	5.56	13
John Morris	13	1	1	0	5.27	8
Bo Belinsky	9	0	2	0	2.93	8
Ed Roebuck	6	0	2	0	6.00	5
Steve Ridzik	2	0	0	0	7.71	0
Grant Jackson	2	0	0	0	5.40	0
Ferguson Jenkins	1	0	0	0	3.86	2

== Farm system ==
Level	Team	League	Manager
AAA	San Diego Padres	Pacific Coast League	Frank Lucchesi
AA	Macon Peaches	Southern League	Andy Seminick
A	Bakersfield Bears	California League	Dick Teed
A	Tidewater Tides	Carolina League	Bobby Morgan and Lou Kahn
A	Spartanburg Phillies	Western Carolinas League	Bob Wellman
A-Short Season	Huron Phillies	Northern League	Joe Lonnett
A-Short Season	Eugene Emeralds	Northwest League	Hugh Luby

LEAGUE CHAMPIONS: Spartanburg

Eugene affiliation shared with St. Louis Cardinals
