= 1966 Cincinnati Reds season =

1966 Cincinnati Reds
- League: National League
- Ballpark: Crosley Field
- City: Cincinnati
- Owners: Bill DeWitt
- General managers: Bill DeWitt
- Managers: Don Heffner, Dave Bristol
- Television: WLWT (Ed Kennedy, Frank McCormick)
- Radio: WCKY (Jim McIntyre, Claude Sullivan)

The 1966 Cincinnati Reds season was the 97th season for the franchise in Major League Baseball. The Reds finished in seventh place in the National League with a record of 76–84, 18 games behind the NL Champion Los Angeles Dodgers. The Reds were managed by Don Heffner (37–46) and Dave Bristol (39–38), who replaced Heffner in mid-July.

== Offseason ==
- December 9, 1965: Frank Robinson was traded by the Reds to the Baltimore Orioles for Milt Pappas, Jack Baldschun, and Dick Simpson.

== Regular season ==
=== Season standings ===
National League
Team	W	L	Pct.	GB	Home	Road
Los Angeles Dodgers	95	67	.586	—	53‍–‍28	42‍–‍39
San Francisco Giants	93	68	.578	1½	47‍–‍34	46‍–‍34
Pittsburgh Pirates	92	70	.568	3	46‍–‍35	46‍–‍35
Philadelphia Phillies	87	75	.537	8	48‍–‍33	39‍–‍42
Atlanta Braves	85	77	.525	10	43‍–‍38	42‍–‍39
St. Louis Cardinals	83	79	.512	12	43‍–‍38	40‍–‍41
Cincinnati Reds	76	84	.475	18	46‍–‍33	30‍–‍51
Houston Astros	72	90	.444	23	45‍–‍36	27‍–‍54
New York Mets	66	95	.410	28½	32‍–‍49	34‍–‍46
Chicago Cubs	59	103	.364	36	32‍–‍49	27‍–‍54

=== Record vs. opponents ===
1966 National League record Sources:
Team	ATL	CHC	CIN	HOU	LAD	NYM	PHI	PIT	SF	STL
Atlanta	—	7–11	10–8	14–4–1	7–11	14–4	11–7	7–11	8–10	7–11
Chicago	11–7	—	6–12	5–13	8–10	8–10	5–13	6–12	6–12	4–14
Cincinnati	8–10	12–6	—	4–14	6–12	10–7	10–8	8–10	7–10	11–7
Houston	4–14–1	13–5	14–4	—	7–11	7–11	7–11	4–14	6–12	10–8
Los Angeles	11–7	10–8	12–6	11–7	—	12–6	11–7	9–9	9–9	10–8
New York	4–14	10–8	7–10	11–7	6–12	—	7–11	5–13	9–9	7–11
Philadelphia	7-11	13–5	8–10	11–7	7–11	11–7	—	10–8	10–8	10–8
Pittsburgh	11–7	12–6	10–8	14–4	9–9	13–5	8–10	—	7–11	8–10
San Francisco	10–8	12–6	10–7	12–6	9–9	9–9	8–10	11–7	—	12–6
St. Louis	11–7	14–4	7–11	8–10	8–10	11–7	8–10	10–8	6–12	—

=== Notable transactions ===
- April 4, 1966: Marty Keough was purchased from the Reds by the Atlanta Braves.
- June 7, 1966: Gary Nolan was drafted by the Reds in the 1st round (13th pick) of the 1966 Major League Baseball draft.

=== Roster ===
1966 Cincinnati Reds
Roster
Pitchers: 35 Gerry Arrigo; 27 Jack Baldschun; 56 Ted Davidson; 32 Sammy Ellis; 38 Hank Fischer; 30 Joey Jay; 46 Jim Maloney; 42 Billy McCool; 43 Don Nottebart; 41 Joe Nuxhall; 54 Darrell Osteen; 31 Jim O'Toole; 34 Milt Pappas; 38 John Tsitouris; 33 Dom Zanni	Catchers: 7 Jimmie Coker; 6 Johnny Edwards; 8 Don Pavletich; Infielders: 16 Leo Cárdenas; 18 Gordy Coleman; 19 Tommy Helms; 23 Lee May; 24 Tony Pérez; 14 Pete Rose; 15 Chico Ruiz	Outfielders: 17 Tommy Harper; 11 Deron Johnson; 28 Vada Pinson; 22 Mel Queen; 12 Art Shamsky; 20 Dick Simpson	Manager: 10 Don Heffner (4/15–7/10); 4 Dave Bristol (7/14–10/2); Coaches: 10 Vern Benson (Third base after 7/14); 4 Dave Bristol (Third base until 7/10); 3 Mel Harder (Pitching); 13 Ray Shore (Batting practice); 2 Roy Sievers (First base); 9 Whitey Wietelmann (Bullpen)

== Player stats ==
= Indicates team leader

=== Batting ===
==== Starters by position ====
Note: Pos = Position; G = Games played; AB = At bats; H = Hits; Avg. = Batting average; HR = Home runs; RBI = Runs batted in

Pos	Player	G	AB	H	Avg.	HR	RBI
C	Johnny Edwards	98	282	54	.191	6	39
1B	Tony Pérez	99	257	68	.265	4	39
2B	Pete Rose	156	654	205	.313	16	70
SS	Leo Cárdenas	160	568	145	.255	20	81
3B	Tommy Helms	138	542	154	.284	9	49
LF	Deron Johnson	142	505	130	.257	24	81
CF	Vada Pinson	156	618	178	.288	16	76
RF	Tommy Harper	149	553	154	.278	5	31

==== Other batters ====
Note: G = Games played; AB = At bats; H = Hits; Avg. = Batting average; HR = Home runs; RBI = Runs batted in

Player	G	AB	H	Avg.	HR	RBI
Don Pavletich	83	235	69	.294	12	38
Art Shamsky	96	234	54	.231	21	47
Gordy Coleman	91	227	57	.251	5	37
Jimmie Coker	50	111	28	.252	4	14
Chico Ruiz	82	110	28	.255	0	5
Dick Simpson	92	84	20	.238	4	14
Lee May	25	75	25	.333	2	10
Mel Queen	56	55	7	.127	0	5

=== Pitching ===
==== Starting pitchers ====
Note: G = Games pitched; IP = Innings pitched; W = Wins; L = Losses; ERA = Earned run average; SO = Strikeouts

Player	G	IP	W	L	ERA	SO
Jim Maloney	32	224.2	16	8	2.80	216
Sammy Ellis	41	221.0	12	19	5.29	154
Milt Pappas	33	209.2	12	11	4.29	133
Jim O'Toole	25	142.0	5	7	3.55	96
Joey Jay	12	73.2	6	2	3.91	44

==== Other pitchers ====
Note: G = Games pitched; IP = Innings pitched; W = Wins; L = Losses; ERA = Earned run average; SO = Strikeouts

Player	G	IP	W	L	ERA	SO
Joe Nuxhall	35	130.0	6	8	4.50	71
Hank Fischer	11	38.0	0	6	6.63	24

==== Relief pitchers ====
Note: G = Games pitched; W = Wins; L = Losses; SV = Saves; ERA = Earned run average; SO = Strikeouts

Player	G	W	L	SV	ERA	SO
Billy McCool	57	8	8	18	2.48	104
Don Nottebart	59	5	4	11	3.07	69
Ted Davidson	54	5	4	4	3.90	54
Jack Baldschun	42	1	5	0	5.49	44
Darrell Osteen	13	0	2	1	12.00	17
Mel Queen	7	0	0	1	6.43	9
Dom Zanni	5	0	0	0	0.00	5
Gerry Arrigo	3	0	0	0	4.91	3
John Tsitouris	1	0	0	0	18.00	0

== Awards and honors ==
- Tommy Helms, Rookie of the Year

All-Star Game

- Leo Cardenas, Shortstop, Reserve
- Billy McCool, Pitcher, Reserve

== Farm system ==
Level	Team	League	Manager
AAA	Buffalo Bisons	International League	Red Davis
AA	Knoxville Smokies	Southern League	Jack Cassini
A	Peninsula Grays	Carolina League	Pinky May
A	Tampa Tarpons	Florida State League	Lou Fitzgerald
A-Short Season	Sioux Falls Packers	Northern League	Jim Snyder
