= 1966 St. Louis Cardinals season =

Major League Baseball season

1966 St. Louis Cardinals
- League: National League
- Ballpark: Busch Stadium I Busch Memorial Stadium
- City: St. Louis, Missouri
- Record: 83–79 (.512)
- League place: 6th
- Owners: August "Gussie" Busch
- General managers: Bob Howsam
- Managers: Red Schoendienst
- Television: KSD-TV
- Radio: KMOX (Harry Caray, Jack Buck, Jerry Gross)

The 1966 St. Louis Cardinals season was the team's 85th season in St. Louis, Missouri and its 75th season in the National League. The Cardinals went 83–79 during the season and finished sixth in the National League, 12 games behind the Los Angeles Dodgers.

== Offseason ==
- October 20, 1965: Ken Boyer was traded by the Cardinals to the New York Mets for Charley Smith and Al Jackson.
- October 27, 1965: Dick Groat, Bob Uecker and Bill White were traded by the Cardinals to the Philadelphia Phillies for Pat Corrales, Art Mahaffey, and Alex Johnson.
- November 29, 1965: Nate Colbert was drafted from the Cardinals by the Houston Astros in the 1965 rule 5 draft.
- November 29, 1965: 1965 first-year draft
  - Jimy Williams was drafted by the Cardinals from the Boston Red Sox.
  - Willie Montañez was drafted from the Cardinals by the California Angels.

== Regular season ==
This season marked the final time the Cardinals played in Sportsman's Park/Busch Stadium I, as they played their final home game at that ballpark on May 8, losing to the San Francisco Giants, 10–5. Busch sought to replace the increasingly inadequate Busch Stadium (formerly Sportsman's Park) with a modern facility in a better location. The result was a new multi-purpose, $25 million concrete stadium, also named for Busch's father – Busch Memorial Stadium, also known as Busch II.

The Cardinals moved into Busch II four days later, and defeated the Atlanta Braves, 4–3 in 12 innings. On July 12, the Cardinals hosted the 1966 Major League Baseball All-Star Game at their new stadium, in 105 degree heat and humidity, with the NL defeating the AL, 2–1 in ten innings. Busch Memorial Stadium was where the Cardinals would play baseball until the end of 2005.

Later derided as a facsimile of the bland, cookie-cutter "multi-purpose stadia" built in multiple locations of the United States during the 1960s and 1970s, Busch Memorial achieved a measure of popularity among St. Louis fans in a way that its cousins in Philadelphia, Atlanta, Pittsburgh, and Cincinnati did not, perhaps due in part to the success of the teams which played there, and perhaps also due to the distinctive roof arches added by architect Edward Durrell Stone — unique touches meant to echo the city's new iconic monument (completed at nearly the same time), the Gateway Arch.

Pitcher Bob Gibson and outfielder Curt Flood won Gold Gloves this year.

=== Season standings ===
National League
Team	W	L	Pct.	GB	Home	Road
Los Angeles Dodgers	95	67	.586	—	53‍–‍28	42‍–‍39
San Francisco Giants	93	68	.578	1½	47‍–‍34	46‍–‍34
Pittsburgh Pirates	92	70	.568	3	46‍–‍35	46‍–‍35
Philadelphia Phillies	87	75	.537	8	48‍–‍33	39‍–‍42
Atlanta Braves	85	77	.525	10	43‍–‍38	42‍–‍39
St. Louis Cardinals	83	79	.512	12	43‍–‍38	40‍–‍41
Cincinnati Reds	76	84	.475	18	46‍–‍33	30‍–‍51
Houston Astros	72	90	.444	23	45‍–‍36	27‍–‍54
New York Mets	66	95	.410	28½	32‍–‍49	34‍–‍46
Chicago Cubs	59	103	.364	36	32‍–‍49	27‍–‍54

=== Record vs. opponents ===
1966 National League record Sources:
Team	ATL	CHC	CIN	HOU	LAD	NYM	PHI	PIT	SF	STL
Atlanta	—	7–11	10–8	14–4–1	7–11	14–4	11–7	7–11	8–10	7–11
Chicago	11–7	—	6–12	5–13	8–10	8–10	5–13	6–12	6–12	4–14
Cincinnati	8–10	12–6	—	4–14	6–12	10–7	10–8	8–10	7–10	11–7
Houston	4–14–1	13–5	14–4	—	7–11	7–11	7–11	4–14	6–12	10–8
Los Angeles	11–7	10–8	12–6	11–7	—	12–6	11–7	9–9	9–9	10–8
New York	4–14	10–8	7–10	11–7	6–12	—	7–11	5–13	9–9	7–11
Philadelphia	7-11	13–5	8–10	11–7	7–11	11–7	—	10–8	10–8	10–8
Pittsburgh	11–7	12–6	10–8	14–4	9–9	13–5	8–10	—	7–11	8–10
San Francisco	10–8	12–6	10–7	12–6	9–9	9–9	8–10	11–7	—	12–6
St. Louis	11–7	14–4	7–11	8–10	8–10	11–7	8–10	10–8	6–12	—

=== Notable transactions ===
- May 5, 1966: Willie Montañez was returned to the Cardinals by the California Angels.
- May 8, 1966: Ray Sadecki was traded by the Cardinals to the San Francisco Giants for Orlando Cepeda.

=== Roster ===
1966 St. Louis Cardinals
Roster
Pitchers: 35 Dennis Aust; 34 Nelson Briles; 32 Steve Carlton; 42 Jim Cosman; 29 Don Dennis; 45 Bob Gibson; 43 Joe Hoerner; 31 Dick Hughes; 38 Al Jackson; 39 Larry Jaster; 30 Art Mahaffey; 37 Ron Piché; 37 Ray Sadecki; 31 Curt Simmons; 40 Tracy Stallard; 44 Ray Washburn; 36 Ron Willis; 46 Hal Woodeshick	Catchers: 7 Pat Corrales; 15 Tim McCarver; Infielders: 11 Jerry Buchek; 28 Orlando Cepeda; 23 Tito Francona; 16 Phil Gagliano; 25 Julián Javier; 14 George Kernek; 27 Dal Maxvill; 1 Charley Smith; 26 Ed Spiezio; 24 Jimy Williams	Outfielders: 20 Lou Brock; 21 Curt Flood; 12 Alex Johnson; 22 Ted Savage; 18 Mike Shannon; 17 Bobby Tolan; Other batters: 19 Bob Skinner	Manager: 2 Red Schoendienst; Coaches: 4 Joe Becker; 8 Bob Milliken; 3 Joe Schultz; 5 Dick Sisler

== Player stats ==
= Indicates team leader

= Indicates league leader

=== Batting ===
==== Starters by position ====
Note: Pos = Position; G = Games played; AB = At bats; H = Hits; Avg. = Batting average; HR = Home runs; RBI = Runs batted in; SB = Stolen Bases

Pos	Player	G	AB	H	Avg.	HR	RBI	SB
C	Tim McCarver	150	543	149	.274	12	68	9
1B	Orlando Cepeda	123	452	137	.303	17	58	9
2B	Julián Javier	147	460	105	.228	7	31	11
SS	Dal Maxvill	134	394	96	.244	0	24	3
3B	Charley Smith	116	391	104	.266	10	43	0
LF	Lou Brock	156	643	183	.285	15	46	74
CF	Curt Flood	160	626	167	.267	10	78	14
RF	Mike Shannon	137	459	132	.288	16	64	8

==== Other batters ====
Note: G = Games played; AB = At bats; H = Hits; Avg. = Batting average; HR = Home runs; RBI = Runs batted in

Player	G	AB	H	Avg.	HR	RBI
Jerry Buchek	100	284	67	.236	4	25
Phil Gagliano	90	213	54	.254	2	15
Tito Francona	83	156	33	.212	4	17
Bobby Tolan	43	93	16	.172	1	6
Alex Johnson	25	86	16	.186	2	6
Ed Spezio	26	73	16	.219	2	10
Pat Corrales	28	72	13	.181	0	3
George Kernek	20	50	12	.240	0	3
Bob Skinner	49	45	7	.156	1	5
Ted Savage	16	29	5	.172	0	3
Jimy Williams	13	11	3	.273	0	1

=== Pitching ===
==== Starting pitchers ====
Note: G = Games pitched; IP = Innings pitched; W = Wins; L = Losses; ERA = Earned run average; SO = Strikeouts

Player	G	IP	W	L	ERA	SO
Bob Gibson	35	280.1	21	12	2.44	225
Al Jackson	36	232.2	13	15	2.51	90
Ray Washburn	27	170.0	11	9	3.76	98
Larry Jaster	26	151.2	11	5	3.26	92
Steve Carlton	9	52.0	3	3	3.12	25
Jim Cosman	1	9.0	1	0	0.00	5

==== Other pitchers ====
Note: G = Games pitched; IP = Innings pitched; W = Wins; L = Losses; ERA = Earned run average; SO = Strikeouts

Player	G	IP	W	L	ERA	SO
Nelson Briles	49	154.0	4	15	3.21	100
Tracy Stallard	20	52.1	1	5	5.68	35
Art Mahaffey	12	35.0	1	4	6.43	19
Curt Simmons	10	33.1	1	1	4.59	14
Ray Sadecki	5	24.1	2	1	2.22	21
Dick Hughes	6	21.0	2	1	1.71	20

==== Relief pitchers ====
Note: G = Games pitched; W = Wins; L = Losses; SV = Saves; ERA = Earned run average; SO = Strikeouts

Player	G	W	L	SV	ERA	SO
Joe Hoerner	57	5	1	13	1.54	63
Hal Woodeshick	59	2	1	4	1.92	30
Don Dennis	38	4	2	2	4.98	25
Ron Piché	20	1	3	2	4.26	21
Dennis Aust	9	0	1	1	6.52	7
Ron Willis	4	0	0	1	0.00	2

== Awards and records ==
All-Star Game

- Tim McCarver, Catcher, Reserve
- Curt Flood, Outfield, Reserve
- Bob Gibson, Pitcher, Injured (did not play)

- Tim McCarver, National League leader, Triples, (13). McCarver became the second catcher in the history of the National League to lead the league in triples.

== Farm system ==
Level	Team	League	Manager
AAA	Tulsa Oilers	Pacific Coast League	Charlie Metro
AA	Arkansas Travelers	Texas League	Vern Rapp
A	St. Petersburg Cardinals	Florida State League	Sparky Anderson
A	Cedar Rapids Cardinals	Midwest League	Ron Plaza
A	Rock Hill Cardinals	Western Carolinas League	Jack Krol
A-Short Season	Eugene Emeralds	Northwest League	Hugh Luby
Rookie	GCL Cardinals	Gulf Coast League	George Kissell

Eugene affiliation shared with Philadelphia Phillies
