= 1966 Chicago Cubs season =

1966 Chicago Cubs
- League: National League
- Ballpark: Wrigley Field
- City: Chicago
- Record: 59–103 (.364)
- League place: 10th
- Owners: Philip K. Wrigley
- General managers: John Holland
- Managers: Leo Durocher
- Television: WGN-TV (Jack Brickhouse, Lloyd Pettit)
- Radio: WGN (Vince Lloyd, Lou Boudreau)

The 1966 Chicago Cubs season was the 95th season of the Chicago Cubs franchise, the 91st in the National League and the 51st at Wrigley Field. The Cubs finished tenth and last in the National League with a record of 59–103, 36 games behind the NL Champion Los Angeles Dodgers. The Cubs would not lose 100 or more games in a season for another 46 seasons. One of the defining trades in Cubs history occurred on April 21, when the Cubs acquired future Cy Young Award winner Ferguson Jenkins in a trade with the Philadelphia Phillies.

== Offseason ==
- December 2, 1965: Lindy McDaniel and Don Landrum were traded by the Cubs to the San Francisco Giants for Randy Hundley and Bill Hands.
- January 10, 1966: Doug Clemens was traded by the Cubs to the Philadelphia Phillies for Wes Covington.

== Regular season ==
=== Season standings ===
National League
Team	W	L	Pct.	GB	Home	Road
Los Angeles Dodgers	95	67	.586	—	53‍–‍28	42‍–‍39
San Francisco Giants	93	68	.578	1½	47‍–‍34	46‍–‍34
Pittsburgh Pirates	92	70	.568	3	46‍–‍35	46‍–‍35
Philadelphia Phillies	87	75	.537	8	48‍–‍33	39‍–‍42
Atlanta Braves	85	77	.525	10	43‍–‍38	42‍–‍39
St. Louis Cardinals	83	79	.512	12	43‍–‍38	40‍–‍41
Cincinnati Reds	76	84	.475	18	46‍–‍33	30‍–‍51
Houston Astros	72	90	.444	23	45‍–‍36	27‍–‍54
New York Mets	66	95	.410	28½	32‍–‍49	34‍–‍46
Chicago Cubs	59	103	.364	36	32‍–‍49	27‍–‍54

=== Record vs. opponents ===
1966 National League record Sources:
Team	ATL	CHC	CIN	HOU	LAD	NYM	PHI	PIT	SF	STL
Atlanta	—	7–11	10–8	14–4–1	7–11	14–4	11–7	7–11	8–10	7–11
Chicago	11–7	—	6–12	5–13	8–10	8–10	5–13	6–12	6–12	4–14
Cincinnati	8–10	12–6	—	4–14	6–12	10–7	10–8	8–10	7–10	11–7
Houston	4–14–1	13–5	14–4	—	7–11	7–11	7–11	4–14	6–12	10–8
Los Angeles	11–7	10–8	12–6	11–7	—	12–6	11–7	9–9	9–9	10–8
New York	4–14	10–8	7–10	11–7	6–12	—	7–11	5–13	9–9	7–11
Philadelphia	7–11	13–5	8–10	11–7	7–11	11–7	—	10–8	10–8	10–8
Pittsburgh	11–7	12–6	10–8	14–4	9–9	13–5	8–10	—	7–11	8–10
San Francisco	10–8	12–6	10–7	12–6	9–9	9–9	8–10	11–7	—	12–6
St. Louis	11–7	14–4	7–11	8–10	8–10	11–7	8–10	10–8	6–12	—

=== Notable transactions ===
- April 21, 1966: Larry Jackson and Bob Buhl were traded by the Cubs to the Philadelphia Phillies for Ferguson Jenkins, John Herrnstein and Adolfo Phillips.
- April 28, 1966: Bobby Cox and cash were traded by the Cubs to the Atlanta Braves for Billy Cowan.
- May 14, 1966: Frank Thomas was signed as a free agent by the Cubs.
- May 28, 1966: Wes Covington was released by the Cubs.
- May 29, 1966: John Herrnstein was traded by the Cubs to the Atlanta Braves for Marty Keough and Arnold Earley.
- June 4, 1966: Frank Thomas was released by the Cubs.
- June 22, 1966: Billy Cowan was traded by the Cubs to the Philadelphia Phillies for Norm Gigon.

=== Roster ===
1966 Chicago Cubs
Roster
Pitchers: 39 Ted Abernathy; 32 Ernie Broglio; 31 Bob Buhl; 45 Len Church; 45 Bill Connors; 46 Dave Dowling; 47 Arnold Earley; 37 Dick Ellsworth; 47 Chuck Estrada; 13 Bill Faul; 49 Bill Hands; 42 Chuck Hartenstein; 33 Bob Hendley; 40 Billy Hoeft; 30 Ken Holtzman; 46 Larry Jackson; 31 Ferguson Jenkins; 34 Cal Koonce; 43 Don Lee; 41 Fred Norman; 32 Rich Nye; 36 Robin Roberts; 39 Curt Simmons	Catchers: 25 Don Bryant; 9 Randy Hundley; 25 Chris Krug; Infielders: 17 Joey Amalfitano; 14 Ernie Banks; 18 Glenn Beckert; 23 Ron Campbell; 7 John Herrnstein; 11 Don Kessinger; 28 Roberto Peña; 22 Paul Popovich; 10 Ron Santo; 8 Lee Thomas	Outfielders: 21 George Altman; 12 John Boccabella; 29 Byron Browne; 20 Ty Cline; 43 Wes Covington; 28 Marty Keough; 7 Harvey Kuenn; 20,41 Adolfo Phillips; 27 Bob Raudman; 19 Jimmy Stewart; 23 Carl Warwick; 26 Billy Williams; Other batters: 34 Frank Thomas	Manager: 2 Leo Durocher; Coaches: 3 Fred Fitzsimmons; 5 Whitey Lockman; 7 Pete Reiser; 4 Verlon Walker

== Player stats ==
= Indicates team leader

=== Batting ===
==== Starters by position ====
Note: G = Games played; AB = At bats; H = Hits; Avg. = Batting average; HR = Home runs; RBI = Runs batted in

Pos.	Player	G	AB	H	Avg.	HR	RBI
C	Randy Hundley	149	526	124	.236	19	63
1B	Ernie Banks	141	511	139	.272	15	75
2B	Glenn Beckert	153	656	188	.287	1	59
3B	Ron Santo	155	561	175	.312	30	94
SS	Don Kessinger	150	533	146	.274	1	43
LF	Byron Browne	120	419	102	.243	16	51
CF	Adolfo Phillips	116	416	109	.262	16	36
RF	Billy Williams	162	648	179	.276	29	91

==== Other batters ====
Note: G = Games played; AB = At bats; H = Hits; Avg. = Batting average; HR = Home runs; RBI = Runs batted in

Player	G	AB	H	Avg.	HR	RBI
John Boccabella	75	206	47	.228	6	25
George Altman	88	185	41	.222	5	17
Lee Thomas	75	149	36	.242	1	9
Jimmy Stewart	57	90	16	.178	0	4
Ron Campbell	24	60	13	.217	0	4
Joey Amalfitano	41	38	6	.158	0	3
Bob Raudman	8	29	7	.241	0	2
Chris Krug	11	28	6	.214	0	1
Marty Keough	33	26	6	.231	0	5
Don Bryant	13	26	8	.308	0	4
Carl Warwick	16	22	5	.227	0	0
John Herrnstein	9	17	3	.176	0	0
Roberto Peña	6	17	3	.176	0	1
Ty Cline	7	17	6	.353	0	2
Wes Covington	9	11	1	.091	0	0
Paul Popovich	2	6	0	.000	0	0
Frank Thomas	5	5	0	.000	0	0
Harvey Kuenn	3	3	1	.333	0	0

=== Pitching ===
==== Starting pitchers ====
Note: G = Games pitched; IP = Innings pitched; W = Wins; L = Losses; ERA = Earned run average; SO = Strikeouts

Player	G	IP	W	L	ERA	SO
Dick Ellsworth	38	269.1	8	22	3.98	144
Ken Holtzman	34	220.2	11	16	3.79	171
Ernie Broglio	15	62.1	2	6	6.35	34
Dave Dowling	1	9.0	1	0	2.00	3
Bob Buhl	1	2.1	0	0	15.43	1

==== Other pitchers ====
Note: G = Games pitched; IP = Innings pitched; W = Wins; L = Losses; ERA = Earned run average; SO = Strikeouts

Player	G	IP	W	L	ERA	SO
Ferguson Jenkins	60	182.0	6	8	3.31	148
Bill Hands	41	159.0	8	15	4.58	93
Curt Simmons	19	77.1	4	7	4.07	24
Bill Faul	17	51.1	1	4	5.08	32
Robin Roberts	11	48.1	2	3	6.14	28
Rich Nye	3	17.0	0	2	2.12	9
Larry Jackson	3	8.0	0	2	13.50	5

==== Relief pitchers ====
Note: G = Games pitched; W = Wins; L = Losses; SV = Saves; ERA = Earned run average; SO = Strikeouts

Player	G	W	L	SV	ERA	SO
Bob Hendley	43	4	5	7	3.91	65
Cal Koonce	45	5	5	2	3.81	65
Billy Hoeft	36	1	2	3	4.61	30
Ted Abernathy	20	1	3	4	6.18	18
Don Lee	16	2	1	0	7.11	7
Arnold Earley	13	2	1	0	3.57	12
Bill Connors	11	0	1	0	7.31	3
Chuck Estrada	9	1	1	0	7.30	3
Chuck Hartenstein	5	0	0	0	1.93	4
Len Church	4	0	1	0	7.50	3
Fred Norman	2	0	0	0	4.50	6

== Awards and honors ==
- Ron Santo, Gold Glove

All-Star Game

- Ron Santo, Third Base, Reserve

== Farm system ==
Level	Team	League	Manager
AAA	Tacoma Cubs	Pacific Coast League	Les Peden
AA	Dallas-Fort Worth Spurs	Texas League	Stan Hack, Pete Reiser and Lou Klein
A	Lodi Crushers	California League	Don Elston and Ray Perry
A	Quincy Cubs	Midwest League	Walt Dixon
A-Short Season	Duluth–Superior Dukes	Northern League	Joe Grace
Rookie	Treasure Valley Cubs	Pioneer League	George Freese
