= 1966 New York Mets season =

1966 New York Mets
- League: National League
- Ballpark: Shea Stadium
- City: New York
- Record: 66–95 (.410)
- League place: 9th
- Owners: Joan Whitney Payson
- General managers: George Weiss, Bing Devine
- Manager: Wes Westrum
- Television: WOR-TV
- Radio: WHN (Ralph Kiner, Lindsey Nelson, Bob Murphy)

The 1966 New York Mets season was the fifth regular season for the Mets. They went 66–95 and finished ninth in the National League. They were managed by Wes Westrum. They played home games at Shea Stadium.

1966 marked the first season in which the Mets avoided a last place finish, as well as the first time they did not lose at least 100 games. It was also the first time their record was above .500 at any point of the season, as they stood 2–1 after taking two of three games in the opening series with the Atlanta Braves.

== Offseason ==
- October 20, 1965: Charley Smith and Al Jackson were traded by the Mets to the St. Louis Cardinals for Ken Boyer.
- November 29, 1965: Al Luplow was purchased by the Mets from the Cleveland Indians.
- November 30, 1965: Joe Christopher was traded by the Mets to the Boston Red Sox for Ed Bressoud.
- January 6, 1966: Gary Kroll was traded by the Mets to the Houston Astros for Johnny Weekly and cash.

== Regular season ==
- September 11, 1966: Pitcher Pat Jarvis of the Atlanta Braves becomes the first of 5,714 strikeout victims of Nolan Ryan's career.

=== Season standings ===
National League
Team	W	L	Pct.	GB	Home	Road
Los Angeles Dodgers	95	67	.586	—	53‍–‍28	42‍–‍39
San Francisco Giants	93	68	.578	1½	47‍–‍34	46‍–‍34
Pittsburgh Pirates	92	70	.568	3	46‍–‍35	46‍–‍35
Philadelphia Phillies	87	75	.537	8	48‍–‍33	39‍–‍42
Atlanta Braves	85	77	.525	10	43‍–‍38	42‍–‍39
St. Louis Cardinals	83	79	.512	12	43‍–‍38	40‍–‍41
Cincinnati Reds	76	84	.475	18	46‍–‍33	30‍–‍51
Houston Astros	72	90	.444	23	45‍–‍36	27‍–‍54
New York Mets	66	95	.410	28½	32‍–‍49	34‍–‍46
Chicago Cubs	59	103	.364	36	32‍–‍49	27‍–‍54

=== Record vs. opponents ===
1966 National League record Sources:
Team	ATL	CHC	CIN	HOU	LAD	NYM	PHI	PIT	SF	STL
Atlanta	—	7–11	10–8	14–4–1	7–11	14–4	11–7	7–11	8–10	7–11
Chicago	11–7	—	6–12	5–13	8–10	8–10	5–13	6–12	6–12	4–14
Cincinnati	8–10	12–6	—	4–14	6–12	10–7	10–8	8–10	7–10	11–7
Houston	4–14–1	13–5	14–4	—	7–11	7–11	7–11	4–14	6–12	10–8
Los Angeles	11–7	10–8	12–6	11–7	—	12–6	11–7	9–9	9–9	10–8
New York	4–14	10–8	7–10	11–7	6–12	—	7–11	5–13	9–9	7–11
Philadelphia	7-11	13–5	8–10	11–7	7–11	11–7	—	10–8	10–8	10–8
Pittsburgh	11–7	12–6	10–8	14–4	9–9	13–5	8–10	—	7–11	8–10
San Francisco	10–8	12–6	10–7	12–6	9–9	9–9	8–10	11–7	—	12–6
St. Louis	11–7	14–4	7–11	8–10	8–10	11–7	8–10	10–8	6–12	—

=== Notable transactions ===
- April 3, 1966: Tom Seaver was signed as an amateur free agent by the Mets.
- June 4, 1966: Galen Cisco was released by the Mets.
- June 7, 1966: Duffy Dyer was drafted by the Mets in the 1st round (9th pick) of the 1966 Major League Baseball draft (secondary phase).
- June 10, 1966: Bob Shaw was purchased by the Mets from the San Francisco Giants.
- August 6, 1966: Ralph Terry was purchased by the Mets from the Kansas City Athletics.

=== Roster ===
1966 New York Mets
Roster
Pitchers: 34 Gerry Arrigo; 31 Larry Bearnarth; 38 Dave Eilers; 22 Jack Fisher; 20 Bob Friend; 29 Rob Gardner; 27 Dallas Green; 32 Jack Hamilton; 28 Bill Hepler; 45 Tug McGraw; 16 Larry Miller; 30 Dennis Ribant; 41 Gordie Richardson; 47 Dick Rusteck; 34 Nolan Ryan; 39 Dick Selma; 26 Bob Shaw; 43 Darrell Sutherland; 38 Ralph Terry	Catchers: 20 Choo-Choo Coleman; 10 Greg Goossen; 15 Jerry Grote; 12 John Stephenson; 19 Hawk Taylor; Infielders: 14 Ken Boyer; 1 Ed Bressoud; 3 Bud Harrelson; 2 Chuck Hiller; 33 Ron Hunt; 7 Ed Kranepool; 11 Roy McMillan; 17 Dick Stuart	Outfielders: 42 Larry Elliot; 5 Shaun Fitzmaurice; 9,27 Jim Hickman; 21 Cleon Jones; 24 Johnny Lewis; 18 Al Luplow; 23 Billy Murphy; 48 Danny Napoleon; 4 Ron Swoboda; Other batters: 6 Lou Klimchock	Manager: 9 Wes Westrum; Coaches: 8 Yogi Berra; 52 Harvey Haddix; 54 Whitey Herzog; 53 Sheriff Robinson

== Player stats ==
=== Batting ===
==== Starters by position ====
Note: Pos = Position; G = Games played; AB = At bats; H = Hits; Avg. = Batting average; HR = Home runs; RBI = Runs batted in

Pos	Player	G	AB	H	Avg.	HR	RBI
C	Jerry Grote	120	317	75	.237	3	31
1B	Ed Kranepool	146	464	118	.254	16	57
2B	Ron Hunt	132	479	138	.288	3	33
SS	Ed Bressoud	133	405	91	.225	10	49
3B	Ken Boyer	136	496	132	.266	14	61
LF	Ron Swoboda	112	342	76	.222	8	50
CF	Cleon Jones	139	495	136	.275	8	57
RF	Al Luplow	111	334	84	.251	7	31

==== Other batters ====
Note: G = Games played; AB = At bats; H = Hits; Avg. = Batting average; HR = Home runs; RBI = Runs batted in

Player	G	AB	H	Avg.	HR	RBI
Chuck Hiller	108	254	71	.280	2	14
Roy McMillan	76	220	47	.214	1	12
Larry Elliot	65	199	49	.246	5	32
Johnny Lewis	65	166	32	.193	5	20
Jim Hickman	58	160	38	.238	4	16
John Stephenson	63	143	28	.196	1	11
Billy Murphy	84	135	31	.230	3	13
Hawk Taylor	53	109	19	.174	3	12
Bud Harrelson	33	99	22	.222	0	4
Dick Stuart	31	87	19	.218	4	13
Danny Napoleon	12	33	7	.212	0	0
Greg Goossen	13	32	6	.188	1	5
Choo-Choo Coleman	6	16	3	.188	0	0
Shaun Fitzmaurice	9	13	2	.154	0	0
Lou Klimchock	5	5	0	.000	0	0

=== Pitching ===
==== Starting pitchers ====
Note: G = Games pitched; IP = Innings pitched; W = Wins; L = Losses; ERA = Earned run average; SO = Strikeouts

Player	G	IP	W	L	ERA	SO
Jack Fisher	38	230.0	11	14	3.68	127
Dennis Ribant	39	188.1	11	9	3.20	84
Bob Shaw	26	167.2	11	10	3.92	104

==== Other pitchers ====
Note: G = Games pitched; IP = Innings pitched; W = Wins; L = Losses; ERA = Earned run average; SO = Strikeouts

Player	G	IP	W	L	ERA	SO
Jack Hamilton	57	148.2	6	13	3.93	93
Rob Gardner	41	133.2	4	8	5.12	74
Bob Friend	22	86.0	5	8	4.40	30
Dick Selma	30	80.2	4	6	4.24	58
Tug McGraw	15	62.1	2	9	5.34	34
Gerry Arrigo	17	43.1	3	3	3.74	28
Dick Rusteck	8	24.0	1	2	3.00	9
Larry Miller	4	8.1	0	2	7.56	7
Nolan Ryan	2	3.0	0	1	15.00	6

==== Relief pitchers ====
Note: G = Games pitched; W = Wins; L = Losses; SV = Saves; ERA = Earned run average; SO = Strikeouts

Player	G	W	L	SV	ERA	SO
Bill Hepler	37	3	3	0	3.52	25
Darrell Sutherland	31	2	0	1	4.87	23
Larry Bearnarth	29	2	3	0	4.45	27
Dave Eilers	23	1	1	0	4.67	14
Gordie Richardson	15	0	2	1	9.16	15
Ralph Terry	11	0	1	1	4.74	14
Dallas Green	4	0	0	0	5.40	1

== Farm system ==
Level	Team	League	Manager
AAA	Jacksonville Suns	International League	Solly Hemus
AA	Williamsport Mets	Eastern League	Bill Virdon
A	Auburn Mets	New York–Penn League	Clyde McCullough
A	Greenville Mets	Western Carolinas League	Pete Pavlick
Rookie	Marion Mets	Appalachian League	Buddy Peterson

LEAGUE CHAMPIONS: Auburn, Marion
