= 1966 San Francisco Giants season =

1966 San Francisco Giants
- League: National League
- Ballpark: Candlestick Park
- City: San Francisco, California
- Record: 93–68 (.578)
- League place: 2nd
- Owners: Horace Stoneham
- General managers: Chub Feeney
- Managers: Herman Franks
- Television: KTVU (Russ Hodges, Lon Simmons, Bill Thompson)
- Radio: KSFO (Russ Hodges, Lon Simmons, Bill Thompson)

The 1966 San Francisco Giants season was the Giants' 84th year in Major League Baseball, their ninth year in San Francisco since their move from New York following the 1957 season, and their seventh at Candlestick Park. The Giants finished second in the National League with a record of 93 wins and 68 losses, a game-and-a-half behind their arch-rivals, the NL champion Los Angeles Dodgers.

== Offseason ==
- October 15, 1965: Warren Spahn was released by the Giants.
- December 2, 1965: Randy Hundley and Bill Hands traded to the Chicago Cubs for Lindy McDaniel and Don Landrum.

== Regular season ==
=== Season standings ===
National League
Team	W	L	Pct.	GB	Home	Road
Los Angeles Dodgers	95	67	.586	—	53‍–‍28	42‍–‍39
San Francisco Giants	93	68	.578	1½	47‍–‍34	46‍–‍34
Pittsburgh Pirates	92	70	.568	3	46‍–‍35	46‍–‍35
Philadelphia Phillies	87	75	.537	8	48‍–‍33	39‍–‍42
Atlanta Braves	85	77	.525	10	43‍–‍38	42‍–‍39
St. Louis Cardinals	83	79	.512	12	43‍–‍38	40‍–‍41
Cincinnati Reds	76	84	.475	18	46‍–‍33	30‍–‍51
Houston Astros	72	90	.444	23	45‍–‍36	27‍–‍54
New York Mets	66	95	.410	28½	32‍–‍49	34‍–‍46
Chicago Cubs	59	103	.364	36	32‍–‍49	27‍–‍54

=== Record vs. opponents ===
1966 National League record Sources:
Team	ATL	CHC	CIN	HOU	LAD	NYM	PHI	PIT	SF	STL
Atlanta	—	7–11	10–8	14–4–1	7–11	14–4	11–7	7–11	8–10	7–11
Chicago	11–7	—	6–12	5–13	8–10	8–10	5–13	6–12	6–12	4–14
Cincinnati	8–10	12–6	—	4–14	6–12	10–7	10–8	8–10	7–10	11–7
Houston	4–14–1	13–5	14–4	—	7–11	7–11	7–11	4–14	6–12	10–8
Los Angeles	11–7	10–8	12–6	11–7	—	12–6	11–7	9–9	9–9	10–8
New York	4–14	10–8	7–10	11–7	6–12	—	7–11	5–13	9–9	7–11
Philadelphia	7-11	13–5	8–10	11–7	7–11	11–7	—	10–8	10–8	10–8
Pittsburgh	11–7	12–6	10–8	14–4	9–9	13–5	8–10	—	7–11	8–10
San Francisco	10–8	12–6	10–7	12–6	9–9	9–9	8–10	11–7	—	12–6
St. Louis	11–7	14–4	7–11	8–10	8–10	11–7	8–10	10–8	6–12	—

=== Opening Day lineup ===
- Jesús Alou
- Tito Fuentes
- Len Gabrielson
- Tom Haller
- Jim Ray Hart
- Hal Lanier
- Juan Marichal
- Willie Mays
- Willie McCovey

=== Notable transactions ===
- May 8, 1966: Orlando Cepeda was traded by the Giants to the St. Louis Cardinals for Ray Sadecki.
- June 10, 1966: Bob Shaw was purchased from the Giants by the New York Mets.

== Game log and schedule ==
Legend
	Giants win
	Giants loss
	Postponement
**Bold**	Giants team member

1966 Game Log (93–68) (Home: 47–34; Road: 46–34)
April (11–7) (Home: 7–5; Road: 4–2)

#	Date	Opponent	Score	Win	Loss	Save	Stadium	Attendance	Record	Report
13	April 25	Braves								
14	April 26	Braves								

May (19–9) (Home: 9–5; Road: 10–4)

#	Date	Opponent	Score	Win	Loss	Save	Stadium	Attendance	Record	Report

June (18–12) (Home: 6–2; Road: 12–10)

#	Date	Opponent	Score	Win	Loss	Save	Stadium	Attendance	Record	Report
47	June 1	@ Braves								
48	June 2	@ Braves								
76	June 30	Braves								

July (13–16) (Home: 11–9; Road: 2–7)

#	Date	Opponent	Score	Win	Loss	Save	Stadium	Attendance	Record	Report
77	July 1	Braves								
78	July 2	Braves								
79	July 3	Braves								
102	July 29	@ Braves								
103	July 30	@ Braves								
104	July 30	@ Braves								
105	July 31	@ Braves								

August (17–11) (Home: 10–5; Road: 7–6)

#	Date	Opponent	Score	Win	Loss	Save	Stadium	Attendance	Record	Report
122	August 19	Braves								
123	August 20	Braves								
124	August 21	Braves								

September (12–13) (Home: 5–8; Road: 7–5)

#	Date	Opponent	Score	Win	Loss	Save	Stadium	Attendance	Record	Report
156	September 26	@ Braves								
157	September 27	@ Braves								
158	September 28	@ Braves								

October (3–0) (Road: 3–0)

#	Date	Opponent	Score	Win	Loss	Save	Stadium	Attendance	Record	Report

=== Roster ===
1966 San Francisco Giants
**Roster**
**Pitchers**: 42 Bobby Bolin; 21 Bob Garibaldi; 28 Joe Gibbon; 45 Bill Henry; 34 Ron Herbel; 30 Billy Hoeft; 35 Frank Linzy; 27 Juan Marichal; 39 Lindy McDaniel; 36 Gaylord Perry; 38 Bob Priddy; 48 Rich Robertson; 37 Ray Sadecki; 29 Bob Shaw	**Catchers**: 1 Bob Barton; 2 Dick Dietz; 40 Ozzie Virgil; **Infielders**: 31 Bob Burda; 12 Jim Davenport; 23 Tito Fuentes; 16 Jim Ray Hart; 29 Jack Hiatt; 22 Hal Lanier; 41 Don Mason; 44 Willie McCovey; 15 Dick Schofield; 15 Bob Schroder	**Outfielders**: 14 Jesús Alou; 25 Ollie Brown; 30 Orlando Cepeda; 7 Len Gabrielson; 43 Ken Henderson; 47 Frank Johnson; 43 Don Landrum; 24 Willie Mays; 17 Cap Peterson	**Manager**: 3 Herman Franks; **Coaches**: 9 Charlie Fox; 30 Billy Hoeft; 46 Larry Jansen; 8 Cookie Lavagetto

== Player stats ==
= Indicates team leader

=== Batting ===
==== Starters by position ====
Note: Pos = Position; G = Games played; AB = At bats; H = Hits; Avg. = Batting average; HR = Home runs; RBI = Runs batted in

Pos	Player	G	AB	H	Avg.	HR	RBI
C	Tom Haller	142	471	113	.240	27	67
1B	Willie McCovey	150	502	148	.295	36	96
2B	Hal Lanier	149	459	106	.231	3	37
SS	Tito Fuentes	133	541	141	.261	9	40
3B	Jim Ray Hart	156	578	165	.285	33	93
LF	Len Gabrielson	94	240	52	.217	4	16
CF	Willie Mays	152	552	159	.288	37	103
RF	Ollie Brown	115	348	81	.233	7	33

==== Other batters ====
Note: G = Games played; AB = At bats; H = Hits; Avg. = Batting average; HR = Home runs; RBI = Runs batted in

Player	G	AB	H	Avg.	HR	RBI
Jesús Alou	110	370	96	.259	1	20
Jim Davenport	111	305	76	.249	9	30
Cap Peterson	89	190	45	.237	2	19
Don Landrum	72	102	19	.186	1	7
Bob Barton	43	91	16	.176	0	3
Ozzie Virgil	42	89	19	.213	2	9
Orlando Cepeda	19	49	14	.286	3	15
Bob Burda	37	43	7	.163	0	2
Bob Schroder	10	33	8	.242	0	2
Frank Johnson	15	32	7	.219	0	0
Ken Henderson	11	29	9	.310	1	1
Don Mason	42	25	3	.120	1	1
Jack Hiatt	18	23	7	.304	0	1
Dick Dietz	13	23	1	.043	0	0
Dick Schofield	11	16	1	.063	0	0

=== Pitching ===
==== Starting pitchers ====
Note: G = Games pitched; IP = Innings pitched; W = Wins; L = Losses; ERA = Earned run average; SO = Strikeouts

Player	G	IP	W	L	ERA	SO
Juan Marichal	37	307.1	25	6	2.23	222
Gaylord Perry	36	255.2	21	8	2.99	201
Bobby Bolin	36	224.1	11	10	2.89	143
Ray Sadecki	26	105.0	3	7	5.40	62

==== Other pitchers ====
Note: G = Games pitched; IP = Innings pitched; W = Wins; L = Losses; ERA = Earned run average; SO = Strikeouts

Player	G	IP	W	L	ERA	SO
Ron Herbel	32	129.2	4	5	4.16	55
Joe Gibbon	37	81.0	4	6	3.67	48
Bob Shaw	13	31.2	1	4	6.25	21

==== Relief pitchers ====
Note: G = Games pitched; W = Wins; L = Losses; SV = Saves; ERA = Earned run average; SO = Strikeouts

Player	G	W	L	SV	ERA	SO
Frank Linzy	51	7	11	16	2.96	57
Lindy McDaniel	64	10	5	6	2.66	93
Bob Priddy	38	6	3	1	3.96	51
Bill Henry	35	1	1	1	2.45	15
Billy Hoeft	4	0	2	0	7.36	3
Rich Robertson	1	0	0	0	7.71	2
Bob Garibaldi	1	0	0	0	0.00	0

== Awards and honors ==
- Willie Mays, Gold Glove Award

All-Star Game

- Willie McCovey, 1B, Starter
- Willie Mays, Outfield, Starter
- Jim Ray Hart, 3B, Reserve
- Juan Marichal, Pitcher, Reserve
- Gaylord Perry, Pitcher, Reserve
- Herman Franks, Coach

== Farm system ==
Level	Team	League	Manager
AAA	Phoenix Giants	Pacific Coast League	Bill Werle
AA	Waterbury Giants	Eastern League	Andy Gilbert
A	Fresno Giants	California League	Ed Fitz Gerald
A	Decatur Commodores	Midwest League	Richie Klaus
A	Lexington Giants	Western Carolinas League	Alex Cosmidis and Dennis Sommers
Rookie	Magic Valley Cowboys	Pioneer League	Harvey Koepf
