= 1966 Atlanta Braves season =

1966 Atlanta Braves
- League: National League
- Ballpark: Atlanta Stadium
- City: Atlanta
- Record: 85–77 (.525)
- League place: 5th
- Owners: William Bartholomay (chairman)
- General managers: John McHale, Paul Richards
- Managers: Bobby Bragan 52–59 (.468); Billy Hitchcock 33–18 (.647)
- Television: WSB-TV
- Radio: WSB (Larry Munson, Ernie Johnson, Milo Hamilton, Dizzy Dean)

The 1966 Atlanta Braves season was the first for the franchise in Atlanta, and 96th overall, following their relocation from Milwaukee, where the team had played the previous 13 seasons. The Braves finished their inaugural year in Atlanta in fifth place in the National League with a record of 85–77, ten games behind the Los Angeles Dodgers. The Braves played their first season of home games at Atlanta Stadium. The home attendance for the season was 1,539,801, sixth in the ten-team National League.

== Offseason ==
- November 29, 1965: Jesse Gonder was drafted from the Braves by the Pittsburgh Pirates in the 1965 rule 5 draft.
- January 29, 1966: Tom Seaver was drafted by the Braves in the secondary phase of the 1966 Major League Baseball draft, but the pick was voided.

== Regular season ==
- July 3, 1966: Tony Cloninger became the first National League player—and, as of 2026, the only pitcher—to hit two grand slams in one game.
- September 11, 1966: Rookie pitcher Pat Jarvis of the Braves became the first of 5,714 strikeout victims of Nolan Ryan's career.

=== Opening day ===
The Atlanta Braves' first-ever game was played at home, at Atlanta–Fulton County Stadium, on Tuesday, April 12, 1966, against the Pittsburgh Pirates before 50,671 fans. Braves' starting pitcher Cloninger, a 24-game winner in Milwaukee in 1965, pitched a 13-inning complete game but absorbed a hard-luck, 3–2 loss. With the game tied at one in the top of the 13th, future hall of famer Willie Stargell hit a two-out, two-run home run to put Pittsburgh ahead 3–1. Atlanta catcher Joe Torre hit his second solo homer of the game to narrow the deficit to one run, but the Pirates held on to win. Earlier, in the fifth inning, Torre had hit the first homer in Atlanta's major league history.

==== Starting lineup ====
29	Felipe Alou	CF
41	Eddie Mathews	3B
44	Hank Aaron	RF
43	Rico Carty	LF
15	Joe Torre	C
19	Denis Menke	SS
9	Lee Thomas	1B
2	Frank Bolling	2B
40	Tony Cloninger	P

=== Season standings ===
National League
Team	W	L	Pct.	GB	Home	Road
Los Angeles Dodgers	95	67	.586	—	53‍–‍28	42‍–‍39
San Francisco Giants	93	68	.578	1½	47‍–‍34	46‍–‍34
Pittsburgh Pirates	92	70	.568	3	46‍–‍35	46‍–‍35
Philadelphia Phillies	87	75	.537	8	48‍–‍33	39‍–‍42
Atlanta Braves	85	77	.525	10	43‍–‍38	42‍–‍39
St. Louis Cardinals	83	79	.512	12	43‍–‍38	40‍–‍41
Cincinnati Reds	76	84	.475	18	46‍–‍33	30‍–‍51
Houston Astros	72	90	.444	23	45‍–‍36	27‍–‍54
New York Mets	66	95	.410	28½	32‍–‍49	34‍–‍46
Chicago Cubs	59	103	.364	36	32‍–‍49	27‍–‍54

=== Record vs. opponents ===
1966 National League record Sources:
Team	ATL	CHC	CIN	HOU	LAD	NYM	PHI	PIT	SF	STL
Atlanta	—	7–11	10–8	14–4–1	7–11	14–4	11–7	7–11	8–10	7–11
Chicago	11–7	—	6–12	5–13	8–10	8–10	5–13	6–12	6–12	4–14
Cincinnati	8–10	12–6	—	4–14	6–12	10–7	10–8	8–10	7–10	11–7
Houston	4–14–1	13–5	14–4	—	7–11	7–11	7–11	4–14	6–12	10–8
Los Angeles	11–7	10–8	12–6	11–7	—	12–6	11–7	9–9	9–9	10–8
New York	4–14	10–8	7–10	11–7	6–12	—	7–11	5–13	9–9	7–11
Philadelphia	7–11	13–5	8–10	11–7	7–11	11–7	—	10–8	10–8	10–8
Pittsburgh	11–7	12–6	10–8	14–4	9–9	13–5	8–10	—	7–11	8–10
San Francisco	10–8	12–6	10–7	12–6	9–9	9–9	8–10	11–7	—	12–6
St. Louis	11–7	14–4	7–11	8–10	8–10	11–7	8–10	10–8	6–12	—

=== Front-office and managerial turnover ===
The Braves' first year in Atlanta featured an unusual amount of management churn in both the front office and dugout. On June 28, it was announced that Paul Richards, a veteran former MLB manager and general manager, would join the team as a roving troubleshooter in its farm system. The Braves were then a disappointing 34–42 (.447) and in eighth place in the ten-team National League. Braves president and GM John McHale remarked that Richards, 57, was poised to assume greater responsibilities within the Atlanta organization if called upon, leading to speculation that he would replace embattled field manager Bobby Bragan. More than a quarter-century earlier, in 1938, Richards had begun his management career as the successful player-manager of the minor league Atlanta Crackers.

On August 9, with the Braves still mired in the second division at 52–59 (.468), 12 1/2 games behind and in seventh place, fourth-year skipper Bragan was dismissed and replaced by bench coach Billy Hitchcock, like Richards a former teammate of McHale's with the Detroit Tigers. Hitchcock's hiring would pull the Braves out of their tailspin, and they won 33 of 51 games (.647), advancing to fifth place. But Richards was indeed destined to rise within the Atlanta organization. On August 31, he was named director of player personnel at both the Major and minor-league levels, effectively becoming general manager of baseball operations without the formal title, which McHale temporarily retained. Four months later, McHale resigned from the Braves to join the office of Commissioner of Baseball William Eckert, and on January 11, 1967, Richards was formally named Braves' general manager. He would serve in the post through June 1, 1972.

=== National transactions ===
- April 4, 1966: Marty Keough was purchased by the Braves from the Cincinnati Reds.
- April 5, 1966: Frank Thomas was placed on waivers by the Braves.
- April 28, 1966: Billy Cowan was traded by the Braves to the Chicago Cubs for future Braves manager Bobby Cox and cash.
- May 29, 1966: Marty Keough was traded by the Braves to the Chicago Cubs for John Herrnstein. Arnold Earley was also purchased.
- June 7, 1966: Al Santorini was drafted by the Braves in the 1st round (11th pick) of the 1966 Major League Baseball draft.

=== Roster ===
1966 Atlanta Braves
Roster
Pitchers: 39 Ted Abernathy; 36 Wade Blasingame; 20 Clay Carroll; 40 Tony Cloninger; 34 Hank Fischer; 24 Herb Hippauf; 33 Pat Jarvis; 42 Joey Jay; 30 Ken Johnson; 22 Dick Kelley; 23 Denny Lemaster; 35 Phil Niekro; 22 Billy O'Dell; 38 Chi-Chi Olivo; 22 Ron Reed; 26 Jay Ritchie; 25 Dan Schneider; 37 Don Schwall; 32 Arnold Umbach; 34 Cecil Upshaw; 34 Charlie Vaughan	Catchers: 12 Gene Oliver; 45 Ed Sadowski; 15 Joe Torre; Infielders: 16 Sandy Alomar Sr.; 29 Felipe Alou; 11 Lee Bales; 2 Frank Bolling; 11 Marty Keough; 9 George Kopacz; 41 Eddie Mathews; 19 Denis Menke; 11 Félix Millán; 9 Lee Thomas; 14 Woody Woodward	Outfielders: 44 Hank Aaron; 43 Rico Carty; 27 Ty Cline; 18 Adrian Garrett; 31 Gary Geiger; 26 John Herrnstein; 48 Mack Jones; 24 Bill Robinson	Manager: 10 Bobby Bragan; 8 Billy Hitchcock; Coaches: 8 Billy Hitchcock; 6 Grover Resinger; 3 Ken Silvestri; 4 Jo-Jo White; 5 Whit Wyatt

== Player stats ==
=== Batting ===
==== Starters by position ====
Note: Pos = Position; G = Games played; AB = At bats; H = Hits; Avg. = Batting average; HR = Home runs; RBI = Runs batted in

Pos	Player	G	AB	H	Avg.	HR	RBI
C	Joe Torre	148	546	172	.315	36	101
1B	Felipe Alou	154	666	218	.327	31	74
2B	Woody Woodward	144	455	120	.264	0	43
SS	Denis Menke	138	454	114	.251	15	60
3B	Eddie Mathews	134	452	113	.250	16	53
LF	Rico Carty	151	521	170	.326	15	76
CF	Mack Jones	118	417	110	.264	23	66
RF	Hank Aaron	158	603	168	.279	44	127

==== Other batters ====
Note: G = Games played; AB = At bats; H = Hits; Avg. = Batting average; HR = Home runs; RBI = Runs batted in

Player	G	AB	H	Avg.	HR	RBI
Frank Bolling	75	227	48	.211	1	18
Gene Oliver	76	191	37	.194	8	24
Gary Geiger	78	126	33	.262	4	10
Lee Thomas	39	126	25	.198	6	15
Mike de la Hoz	71	110	24	.218	2	7
Félix Millán	37	91	25	.275	0	5
Ty Cline	42	71	18	.254	0	6
Sandy Alomar Sr.	31	44	4	.091	0	2
John Herrnstein	17	18	4	.222	0	1
Marty Keough	17	17	1	.059	0	1
Lee Bales	12	16	1	.063	0	0
Bill Robinson	6	11	3	.273	0	3
George Kopacz	6	9	0	.000	0	0
Ed Sadowski	3	9	1	.111	0	1
Adrian Garrett	4	3	0	.000	0	0

=== Pitching ===
==== Starting pitchers ====
Note: G = Games pitched; IP = Innings pitched; W = Wins; L = Losses; ERA = Earned run average; SO = Strikeouts

Player	G	IP	W	L	ERA	SO
Tony Cloninger	39	257.2	14	11	4.12	178
Ken Johnson	32	215.2	14	8	3.30	105
Denny Lemaster	27	171.0	11	8	3.74	139
Wade Blasingame	16	67.2	3	7	5.32	34
Pat Jarvis	10	62.1	6	2	2.31	41
Joey Jay	9	29.2	0	4	7.89	19
Ron Reed	2	8.1	1	1	2.16	6
Charlie Vaughan	1	7.0	1	0	2.57	6

==== Other pitchers ====
Note: G = Games pitched; IP = Innings pitched; W = Wins; L = Losses; ERA = Earned run average; SO = Strikeouts

Player	G	IP	W	L	ERA	SO
Dick Kelley	20	81.0	7	5	3.22	50
Hank Fischer	14	48.1	2	3	3.91	22
Don Schwall	11	45.1	3	3	4.37	27

==== Relief pitchers ====
Note: G = Games pitched; W = Wins; L = Losses; SV = Saves; ERA = Earned run average; SO = Strikeouts

Player	G	W	L	SV	ERA	SO
Clay Carroll	73	8	7	11	2.37	67
Chi-Chi Olivo	47	5	4	7	4.23	41
Ted Abernathy	38	4	4	4	3.86	42
Phil Niekro	28	4	3	2	4.11	17
Billy O'Dell	24	2	3	6	2.40	20
Arnold Umbach	22	0	2	0	3.10	23
Jay Ritchie	22	0	1	4	4.08	33
Dan Schneider	14	0	0	0	3.42	11
Herb Hippauf	3	0	1	0	13.50	1
Cecil Upshaw	1	0	0	0	0.00	2

== Farm system ==
Level	Team	League	Manager
AAA	Richmond Braves	International League	Bill Adair
AA	Austin Braves	Texas League	Hub Kittle
A	Kinston Eagles	Carolina League	Andy Pafko
A	West Palm Beach Braves	Florida State League	Buddy Hicks
A	Yakima Braves	Northwest League	Eddie Haas
Rookie	GCL Braves	Gulf Coast League	Tom Saffell

LEAGUE CHAMPIONS: Austin
