= 1966 Pittsburgh Pirates season =

1966 Pittsburgh Pirates
- League: National League
- Ballpark: Forbes Field
- City: Pittsburgh, Pennsylvania
- Owners: John W. Galbreath (majority shareholder); Bing Crosby, Thomas P. Johnson (minority shareholders)
- General managers: Joe L. Brown
- Managers: Harry Walker
- Television: KDKA-TV; Bob Prince, Jim Woods, Don Hoak
- Radio: KDKA; Bob Prince, Jim Woods, Don Hoak

The 1966 Pittsburgh Pirates season involved the team's third-place finish in the National League at 92–70, three games behind the NL Champion Los Angeles Dodgers.

== Offseason ==
- November 22, 1965: Bill Virdon was released by the Pirates.
- November 29, 1965: 1965 rule 5 draft
  - Dave Roberts was selected by the Pirates from the Houston Astros.
  - Jesse Gonder was drafted by the Pirates from the Atlanta Braves.
- December 1, 1965: Matty Alou was traded to the Pirates by the San Francisco Giants for Ozzie Virgil and Joe Gibbon.
- December 10, 1965: Bob Friend was traded by the Pirates to the New York Yankees for Pete Mikkelsen.
- January 29, 1966: Del Unser was drafted by the Pirates in the 4th round of the secondary phase of the 1966 Major League Baseball draft, but did not sign.

== Regular season ==
Pirates outfielder Roberto Clemente was the National League's Most Valuable Player for the 1966 season.

=== Season standings ===
National League
Team	W	L	Pct.	GB	Home	Road
Los Angeles Dodgers	95	67	.586	—	53‍–‍28	42‍–‍39
San Francisco Giants	93	68	.578	1½	47‍–‍34	46‍–‍34
Pittsburgh Pirates	92	70	.568	3	46‍–‍35	46‍–‍35
Philadelphia Phillies	87	75	.537	8	48‍–‍33	39‍–‍42
Atlanta Braves	85	77	.525	10	43‍–‍38	42‍–‍39
St. Louis Cardinals	83	79	.512	12	43‍–‍38	40‍–‍41
Cincinnati Reds	76	84	.475	18	46‍–‍33	30‍–‍51
Houston Astros	72	90	.444	23	45‍–‍36	27‍–‍54
New York Mets	66	95	.410	28½	32‍–‍49	34‍–‍46
Chicago Cubs	59	103	.364	36	32‍–‍49	27‍–‍54

=== Record vs. opponents ===
1966 National League record Sources:
Team	ATL	CHC	CIN	HOU	LAD	NYM	PHI	PIT	SF	STL
Atlanta	—	7–11	10–8	14–4–1	7–11	14–4	11–7	7–11	8–10	7–11
Chicago	11–7	—	6–12	5–13	8–10	8–10	5–13	6–12	6–12	4–14
Cincinnati	8–10	12–6	—	4–14	6–12	10–7	10–8	8–10	7–10	11–7
Houston	4–14–1	13–5	14–4	—	7–11	7–11	7–11	4–14	6–12	10–8
Los Angeles	11–7	10–8	12–6	11–7	—	12–6	11–7	9–9	9–9	10–8
New York	4–14	10–8	7–10	11–7	6–12	—	7–11	5–13	9–9	7–11
Philadelphia	7-11	13–5	8–10	11–7	7–11	11–7	—	10–8	10–8	10–8
Pittsburgh	11–7	12–6	10–8	14–4	9–9	13–5	8–10	—	7–11	8–10
San Francisco	10–8	12–6	10–7	12–6	9–9	9–9	8–10	11–7	—	12–6
St. Louis	11–7	14–4	7–11	8–10	8–10	11–7	8–10	10–8	6–12	—

=== Game log ===
1966 Game Log: 92–70 (Home: 46–35; Away: 46–35)
April: 10–5 (Home: 6–3; Away: 4–2)

#	Date	Opponent	Score	Win	Loss	Save	Attendance	Record
1	April 12	@ Braves	3–2 (13)	**Schwall** (1–0)	Cloninger	—	50,671	1–0
2	April 13	@ Braves	6–0	**Law** (1–0)	Johnson	—	12,721	2–0
3	April 15	Cardinals	2–9	Gibson	**Cardwell** (0–1)	—	32,231	2–1
4	April 16	Cardinals	5–3	Sisk	Washburn	Face	8,622	3–1
5	April 17	Cardinals	6–5	**Fryman** (1–0)	Jackson	—	12,684	4–1
6	April 18	Reds	4–3	**McBean** (1–0)	Jay	**Face** (2)	7,527	5–1
7	April 19	Reds	7–3	**Blass** (1–0)	Ellis	—	3,750	6–1
8	April 20	Reds	3–2	**Face** (1–0)	Baldschun	—	8,654	7–1
9	April 21	Reds	2–1	**Veale** (1–0)	Pappas	—	5,727	8–1
10	April 22	@ Cardinals	5–7	Washburn	**Mikkelsen** (0–1)	Aust	19,785	8–2
11	April 23	@ Cardinals	5–4	**Mikkelsen** (1–1)	Woodeshick	**Face** (3)	11,508	9–2
12	April 24	@ Cardinals	2–5	Sadecki	**Cardwell** (0–2)	Stallard	11,217	9–3
13	April 25	Phillies	0–5	Bunning	**Veale** (1–1)	—	9,564	9–4
14	April 28	@ Cubs	9–6 (10)	**Face** (2–0)	Koonce	**Mikkelsen** (1)	3,076	10–4
15	April 29	Mets	2–5 (11)	Selma	**Walker** (0–1)	Sutherland	8,665	10–5

May: 14–15 (Home: 5–7; Away: 9–8)

#	Date	Opponent	Score	Win	Loss	Save	Attendance	Record
16	May 1	Mets	8–0	**Veale** (2–1)	Fisher	—	29,433	11–5
17	May 3	@ Reds	5–4 (12)	**Face** (3–0)	Ellis	—	4,669	12–5
18	May 4	@ Reds	4–3	**Blass** (2–0)	O'Toole	**Purkey** (1)	4,019	13–5
19	May 5	@ Reds	6–10	Jay	**McBean** (1–1)	McCool	3,735	13–6
20	May 6	@ Phillies	7–8 (11)	Knowles	**Face** (3–1)	—	18,982	13–7
21	May 7	@ Phillies	3–7	Bunning	**Sisk** (0–1)	—	7,006	13–8
22	May 8	@ Phillies	3–2	**Veale** (3–1)	Herbert	—	8,411	14–8
23	May 10	Giants	1–2 (15)	Linzy	**Purkey** (0–1)	Gibbon	6,750	14–9
24	May 11	Giants	1–6	Perry	**Schwall** (1–1)	—	4,373	14–10
25	May 12	Giants	0–3	Marichal	**Veale** (3–2)	—	5,343	14–11
26	May 13	Dodgers	4–3	**Fryman** (2–0)	Regan	—	13,388	15–11
27	May 14	Dodgers	1–4	Koufax	**Blass** (2–1)	—	11,602	15–12
28	May 15	Dodgers	1–3	Sutton	**Cardwell** (0–3)	Regan	16,205	15–13
29	May 17	Braves	5–2	**Veale** (4–2)	Blasingame	**Face** (4)	7,938	16–13
30	May 18	Braves	2–4	Johnson	**Law** (1–1)	—	7,642	16–14
31	May 20	@ Dodgers	7–3	**Mikkelsen** (2–1)	Sutton	—	33,484	17–14
32	May 21	@ Dodgers	4–5 (12)	Perranoski	**Schwall** (1–2)	—	34,839	17–15
33	May 22	@ Dodgers	4–0	**Veale** (5–2)	Osteen	—	30,826	18–15
34	May 23	@ Dodgers	2–3	Koufax	**Mikkelsen** (2–2)	—	24,188	18–16
35	May 24	@ Giants	2–5	Perry	**Law** (1–2)	Linzy	14,158	18–17
36	May 25	@ Giants	3–2	**Schwall** (2–2)	Shaw	**Face** (5)	9,663	19–17
37	May 26	@ Astros	3–2	**Blass** (3–1)	Farrell	**Mikkelsen** (2)	14,440	20–17
38	May 27	@ Astros	6–0	**Veale** (6–2)	Latman	**Mikkelsen** (3)	18,104	21–17
39	May 28	@ Astros	1–2	Giusti	**Cardwell** (0–4)	Raymond	13,235	21–18
40	May 28	@ Astros	5–2	**Fryman** (3–0)	Roberts	—	30,383	22–18
41	May 29	@ Astros	2–3 (11)	Raymond	**Face** (3–2)	—	25,404	22–19
42	May 30	Cubs	3–2	**Mikkelsen** (3–2)	Ellsworth	—		23–19
43	May 30	Cubs	5–3	**McBean** (2–1)	Connors	**Face** (6)	15,327	24–19
44	May 31	Cubs	1–2	Broglio	**Veale** (6–3)	—	3,825	24–20

June: 19–9 (Home: 11–4; Away: 8–5)

#	Date	Opponent	Score	Win	Loss	Save	Attendance	Record
45	June 1	@ Mets	3–1	**Cardwell** (1–4)	Ribant	**McBean** (1)	11,795	25–20
46	June 2	@ Mets	5–0	**Law** (2–2)	Gardner	—	11,785	26–20
47	June 3	Astros	7–2	**Fryman** (4–0)	Dierker	—	11,263	27–20
48	June 4	Astros	9–6	**Schwall** (3–2)	Raymond	**Mikkelsen** (4)	6,946	28–20
49	June 5	Astros	10–5	**Mikkelsen** (4–2)	Bruce	—	27,370	29–20
50	June 7	Cardinals	9–1	**Cardwell** (2–4)	Gibson	—	12,418	30–20
51	June 8	Cardinals	5–11	Dennis	**Law** (2–3)	—	9,624	30–21
52	June 9	Cardinals	2–4	Jackson	**Fryman** (4–1)	—	11,232	30–22
53	June 10	Braves	2–8	Johnson	**Veale** (6–4)	Olivo	15,177	30–23
54	June 11	Braves	5–3	**Blass** (4–1)	Umbach	**Face** (7)	8,763	31–23
55	June 12	Braves	11–8	**Sisk** (1–1)	Carroll	**Face** (8)	14,520	32–23
56	June 13	Reds	5–4	**Mikkelsen** (5–2)	McCool	—	10,862	33–23
57	June 14	Reds	0–3	Maloney	**Fryman** (4–2)	—	11,655	33–24
58	June 15	@ Cardinals	0–1	Gibson	**Veale** (6–5)	—	21,652	33–25
59	June 16	@ Cardinals	2–1	**Blass** (5–1)	Briles	**Face** (9)	16,877	34–25
60	June 17	@ Braves	4–2	**Cardwell** (3–4)	Carroll	**Fryman** (1)	17,704	35–25
61	June 18	@ Braves	9–6	**Law** (3–3)	Blasingame	**Face** (10)	21,083	36–25
62	June 19	@ Braves	2–1 (11)	**Veale** (7–5)	Abernathy	—	17,229	37–25
63	June 21	@ Reds	8–11	Nottebart	**Fryman** (4–3)	McCool	7,665	37–26
64	June 22	@ Reds	3–4	Maloney	**Mikkelsen** (5–3)	—	7,843	37–27
65	June 23	@ Reds	3–5	Pappas	**Cardwell** (3–5)	Nottebart	6,039	37–28
66	June 24	@ Phillies	3–1	**Veale** (8–5)	Bunning	—	26,791	38–28
67	June 25	@ Phillies	7–8	Culp	**Mikkelsen** (5–4)	Craig	23,160	38–29
68	June 26	@ Phillies	2–0	**Fryman** (5–3)	Jackson	—	18,734	39–29
69	June 27	Astros	8–5	**Blass** (6–1)	Bruce	**Face** (11)	11,679	40–29
70	June 28	Astros	4–3	**Veale** (9–5)	Giusti	—	11,713	41–29
71	June 29	Astros	6–5	**O'Dell** (1–0)	Owens	—	12,500	42–29
72	June 30	Astros	9–0	**Law** (4–3)	Roberts	—	15,183	43–29

July: 17–14 (Home: 8–6; Away: 9–8)

#	Date	Opponent	Score	Win	Loss	Save	Attendance	Record
73	July 1	@ Mets	12–0	**Fryman** (6–3)	Fisher	—	24,056	44–29
74	July 2	@ Mets	3–4	Ribant	**Blass** (6–2)	Hamilton	14,379	44–30
75	July 3	@ Mets	8–7	**Veale** (10–5)	Rusteck	**Face** (12)		45–30
76	July 3	@ Mets	8–9	Gardner	**McBean** (2–2)	Hamilton	28,296	45–31
77	July 4	@ Cubs	7–5	**Law** (5–3)	Hands	**Face** (13)		46–31
78	July 4	@ Cubs	4–6 (8)	Lee	**Cardwell** (3–6)	Hendley	23,164	46–32
79	July 5	@ Cubs	6–0	**Fryman** (7–3)	Faul	—	6,183	47–32
80	July 6	@ Cubs	10–5	**Blass** (7–2)	Ellsworth	**Mikkelsen** (5)	6,483	48–32
81	July 7	@ Cubs	4–5	Hoeft	**Mikkelsen** (5–5)	Hendley	7,063	48–33
82	July 8	Mets	10–2	**Law** (6–3)	Shaw	—		49–33
83	July 8	Mets	9–2	**Sisk** (2–1)	Fisher	**O'Dell** (1)	32,440	50–33
84	July 9	Mets	6–3	**Fryman** (8–3)	Hepler	—	13,309	51–33
85	July 10	Mets	9–4	**Face** (4–2)	Shaw	—	26,150	52–33
86	July 14	Cubs	10–4	**Veale** (11–5)	Ellsworth	—	11,692	53–33
87	July 15	Cubs	4–5	Roberts	**Law** (6–4)	—	15,488	53–34
88	July 16	Cubs	1–4	Hands	**Fryman** (8–4)	Jenkins	9,764	53–35
89	July 17	Giants	7–4	**Blass** (8–2)	Herbel	**Mikkelsen** (6)		54–35
90	July 17	Giants	7–1	**Sisk** (3–1)	Priddy	—	35,184	55–35
91	July 18	Giants	2–3	Perry	**Veale** (11–6)	McDaniel	33,908	55–36
92	July 20	@ Dodgers	8–5	**Cardwell** (4–6)	Brewer	**McBean** (2)	39,545	56–36
93	July 21	@ Dodgers	3–4 (10)	Regan	**Face** (4–3)	—	35,586	56–37
94	July 22	@ Astros	2–5	Dierker	**Blass** (8–3)	—	28,942	56–38
95	July 23	@ Astros	4–3	**McBean** (3–2)	Raymond	**Mikkelsen** (7)	43,825	57–38
96	July 24	@ Astros	11–6	**Cardwell** (5–6)	Taylor	**Face** (14)	34,556	58–38
97	July 25	@ Giants	1–2	Marichal	**Fryman** (8–5)	—	22,191	58–39
98	July 26	@ Giants	3–8	Perry	**Blass** (8–4)	McDaniel	21,786	58–40
99	July 27	@ Giants	5–3	**Mikkelsen** (6–5)	Linzy	**Face** (15)	22,154	59–40
100	July 29	Phillies	5–3	**O'Dell** (2–0)	Short	**Face** (16)	25,358	60–40
101	July 30	Phillies	1–4	Jackson	**Fryman** (8–6)	—	15,804	60–41
102	July 31	Phillies	1–8	Bunning	**Law** (6–5)	—		60–42
103	July 31	Phillies	5–6 (10)	Verbanic	**Face** (4–4)	Herbert	28,947	60–43

August: 18–12 (Home: 11–6; Away: 7–6)

#	Date	Opponent	Score	Win	Loss	Save	Attendance	Record
104	August 1	Dodgers	1–5	Regan	**Sisk** (3–2)	—	27,398	60–44
105	August 2	Dodgers	6–5	**Mikkelsen** (7–5)	Perranoski	**McBean** (3)	12,886	61–44
106	August 3	Dodgers	3–1	**Veale** (12–6)	Sutton	—	21,952	62–44
107	August 4	Dodgers	8–1	**Law** (7–5)	Osteen	—	22,529	63–44
108	August 5	Reds	3–4	Pappas	**Mikkelsen** (7–6)	McCool	20,064	63–45
109	August 6	Reds	9–3	**Sisk** (4–2)	O'Toole	—	11,401	64–45
110	August 7	Reds	7–9	Nottebart	**Veale** (12–7)	McCool	18,470	64–46
111	August 9	Mets	2–1	**Fryman** (9–6)	Ribant	**Mikkelsen** (8)	12,847	65–46
112	August 10	Mets	10–4	**Law** (8–5)	Shaw	**O'Dell** (2)	15,008	66–46
113	August 11	Mets	7–5	**Face** (5–4)	Gardner	—	12,381	67–46
114	August 12	@ Reds	14–11 (13)	**Sisk** (5–2)	McCool	—	25,477	68–46
115	August 13	@ Reds	0–11 (5)	Maloney	**Fryman** (9–7)	—	9,003	68–47
116	August 14	@ Reds	4–2	**Mikkelsen** (8–6)	Nottebart	—	19,767	69–47
117	August 16	@ Mets	3–0 (7)	**Sisk** (6–2)	McGraw	—	23,953	70–47
118	August 17	@ Mets	7–8	Hepler	**McBean** (3–3)	Friend	32,461	70–48
119	August 18	@ Mets	5–9	Gardner	**Fryman** (9–8)	Terry	26,829	70–49
120	August 19	@ Cubs	3–4 (11)	Hendley	**Face** (5–5)	—	11,092	70–50
121	August 20	@ Cubs	3–2	**Sisk** (7–2)	Hands	**Mikkelsen** (9)	14,446	71–50
122	August 21	@ Cubs	8–1	**Veale** (13–7)	Roberts	—	15,944	72–50
123	August 22	Phillies	6–5	**Cardwell** (6–6)	Buhl	**Mikkelsen** (10)	15,119	73–50
124	August 23	Phillies	4–5	Short	**O'Dell** (2–1)	—	25,504	73–51
125	August 24	Phillies	6–4	**Law** (9–5)	Jackson	—	19,899	74–51
126	August 25	Phillies	1–4	Bunning	**Veale** (13–8)	—	25,658	74–52
127	August 26	@ Cardinals	7–4	**Fryman** (10–8)	Jackson	**Mikkelsen** (11)	43,951	75–52
128	August 27	@ Cardinals	1–5	Gibson	**Blass** (8–5)	—	30,457	75–53
129	August 28	@ Cardinals	2–3	Washburn	**Law** (9–6)	Briles		75–54
130	August 28	@ Cardinals	5–1	**O'Dell** (3–1)	Carlton	**Mikkelsen** (12)	46,211	76–54
131	August 29	Astros	0–2	Cuellar	**Veale** (13–9)	—	13,011	76–55
132	August 30	Astros	8–2	**Fryman** (11–8)	Giusti	**Mikkelsen** (13)	11,564	77–55
133	August 31	Dodgers	4–3	**Blass** (9–5)	Drysdale	**O'Dell** (3)	31,036	78–55

September: 14–12 (Home: 5–6; Away: 9–6)

#	Date	Opponent	Score	Win	Loss	Save	Attendance	Record
134	September 1	Dodgers	3–4 (10)	Sutton	**Law** (9–7)	Perranoski	26,761	78–56
135	September 2	Cubs	7–3	**Veale** (14–9)	Jenkins	**Cardwell** (1)	13,677	79–56
136	September 3	Cubs	9–1	**Sisk** (8–2)	Holtzman	—	10,891	80–56
137	September 4	Cubs	8–5	**McBean** (4–3)	Church	**Face** (17)	12,899	81–56
138	September 5	Braves	13–5	**Law** (10–7)	Kelley	—		82–56
139	September 5	Braves	5–7	Cloninger	**Blass** (9–6)	—	30,747	82–57
140	September 6	Braves	1–4	Jarvis	**Veale** (14–10)	Ritchie	10,792	82–58
141	September 7	Braves	3–8	Johnson	**Sisk** (8–3)	—	12,100	82–59
142	September 9	Cardinals	3–2 (12)	**Face** (6–5)	Briles	—	19,676	83–59
143	September 10	Cardinals	5–6	Gibson	**Mikkelsen** (8–7)	Woodeshick	13,535	83–60
144	September 11	Cardinals	3–4	Hughes	**Veale** (14–11)	—	17,859	83–61
145	September 13	@ Astros	9–3	**Sisk** (9–3)	Giusti	**Face** (18)	17,872	84–61
146	September 15	@ Dodgers	3–5	Drysdale	**Law** (10–8)	Regan	50,559	84–62
147	September 16	@ Dodgers	1–5	Koufax	**Veale** (14–12)	—	54,510	84–63
148	September 17	@ Dodgers	9–5	**Law** (11–8)	Miller	**O'Dell** (4)	44,330	85–63
149	September 18	@ Giants	3–1	**Fryman** (12–8)	Perry	—	41,981	86–63
150	September 19	@ Giants	6–1 (11)	**Mikkelsen** (9–7)	Linzy	—	12,871	87–63
151	September 20	@ Giants	6–0	**Law** (12–8)	Herbel	—	30,187	88–63
152	September 21	@ Giants	5–6	Marichal	**Face** (6–6)	—	15,338	88–64
153	September 22	@ Braves	1–14	Jarvis	**Fryman** (12–9)	—	11,004	88–65
154	September 23	@ Braves	3–0	**Veale** (15–12)	Schwall	—	21,238	89–65
155	September 24	@ Braves	8–6	**Blass** (10–6)	Olivo	**Mikkelsen** (14)	20,054	90–65
156	September 25	@ Braves	2–6	Kelley	**Sisk** (9–4)	Carroll	28,372	90–66
157	September 26	@ Phillies	4–5 (11)	Bunning	**O'Dell** (3–2)	—	8,289	90–67
158	September 28	@ Phillies	2–1	**Blass** (11–6)	Bunning	**Sisk** (1)		91–67
159	September 28	@ Phillies	4–2	**Veale** (16–12)	Jackson	—	7,213	92–67

October: 0–3 (Home: 0–3; Away: 0–0)

#	Date	Opponent	Score	Win	Loss	Save	Attendance	Record
160	October 1	Giants	4–5	Marichal	**Mikkelsen** (9–8)	—		92–68
161	October 1	Giants	0–2	Bolin	**Sisk** (9–5)	—	18,928	92–69
162	October 2	Giants	3–7 (11)	McDaniel	**Blass** (11–7)	—	33,827	92–70

Legend: = Win = Loss
Bold = Pirates team member

=== Opening Day lineup ===
Opening Day Starters
#	Name	Position
18	Matty Alou	CF
14	Gene Alley	SS
21	Roberto Clemente	RF
8	Willie Stargell	LF
17	Donn Clendenon	1B
9	Bill Mazeroski	2B
7	Bob Bailey	3B
10	Jim Pagliaroni	C
39	Bob Veale	SP

=== Notable transactions ===
- April 7, 1966: Bob Purkey was sold to the Pirates by the St. Louis Cardinals.
- June 7, 1966: 1966 Major League Baseball draft
  - Richie Hebner was drafted by the Pirates in the 1st round of the 1966 Major League Baseball draft.
  - Dave Cash was drafted by the Pirates in the 5th round of the 1966 Major League Baseball draft.
  - Gene Clines was drafted by the Pirates in the 6th round of the 1966 Major League Baseball draft.
- June 15, 1966: Don Schwall was traded by the Pirates to the Atlanta Braves for Billy O'Dell.

=== Roster ===
1966 Pittsburgh Pirates
**Roster**
**Pitchers**: 28 Steve Blass; 43 Don Cardwell; 26 Roy Face; 22 Woodie Fryman; 32 Vern Law; 34 Al McBean; 19 Pete Mikkelsen; 31 Billy O'Dell; 37 Bob Purkey; 29 Don Schwall; 28 Jim Shellenback; 25 Tommie Sisk; 39 Bob Veale; 31 Luke Walker	**Catchers**: 20 Jesse Gonder; 12 Jerry May; 10 Jim Pagliaroni; **Infielders**: 14 Gene Alley; 7 Bob Bailey; 17 Donn Clendenon; 9 Bill Mazeroski; 45 Gene Michael; 11 José Pagán; 45 Dave Roberts; 16 Andre Rodgers	**Outfielders**: 18 Matty Alou; 23 Don Bosch; 21 Roberto Clemente; 24 Jerry Lynch; 15 Manny Mota; 8 Willie Stargell; **Other batters**: 23 George Spriggs	**Manager**: 3 Harry Walker; **Coaches**: 5 Alex Grammas (Third base); 6 Clyde King (Pitching); 4 Johnny Pesky (First base); 2 Hal Smith (Bullpen)

== Statistics ==
Batting

Note: G = Games played; AB = At bats; H = Hits; Avg. = Batting average; HR = Home runs; RBI = Runs batted in

Regular Season
Player	G	AB	H	Avg.	HR	RBI
Matty Alou	141	535	183	0.342	2	27
Manny Mota	116	322	107	0.332	5	46
Roberto Clemente	154	638	202	0.317	29	119
Willie Stargell	140	485	153	0.315	33	102
Donn Clendenon	155	571	171	0.299	28	98
Gene Alley	147	579	173	0.299	7	43
Bob Bailey	126	380	106	0.279	13	46
Jose Pagan	109	368	97	0.264	4	54
Bill Mazeroski	162	621	163	0.262	16	82
Jerry May	42	52	13	0.250	1	2
Vern Law	34	66	16	0.242	1	3
Jim Pagliaroni	123	374	88	0.235	11	49
Steve Blass	34	52	12	0.231	0	6
Jesse Gonder	59	160	36	0.225	7	16
Jerry Lynch	64	56	12	0.214	1	6
Andre Rodgers	36	49	9	0.184	0	4
Woodie Fryman	36	63	10	0.159	0	2
Gene Michael	30	33	5	0.152	0	2
Pete Mikkelsen	71	20	3	0.150	0	0
George Spriggs	9	7	1	0.143	0	0
Bob Veale	38	94	13	0.138	0	2
Dave Roberts	14	16	2	0.125	0	0
Don Cardwell	32	29	3	0.103	0	3
Al McBean	50	10	1	0.100	0	0
Don Schwall	11	10	1	0.100	0	0
Tommie Sisk	34	51	5	0.098	0	2
Billy O'Dell	37	16	1	0.063	0	1
Don Bosch	3	2	0	0.000	0	0
Roy Face	54	11	0	0.000	0	0
Bob Purkey	11	4	0	0.000	0	0
Luke Walker	10	2	0	0.000	0	0
Jim Shellenback	2	0	0	—	0	0
Team totals	162	5,676	1,586	0.279	158	715

Pitching

Note: G = Games pitched; IP = Innings pitched; W = Wins; L = Losses; ERA = Earned run average; SO = Strikeouts

Regular Season
Player	G	IP	W	L	ERA	SO
Bob Purkey	10	19 2/3	0	1	1.37	5
Don Schwall	11	41 2/3	3	2	2.16	24
Roy Face	54	70	6	6	2.70	67
Billy O'Dell	37	71 1/3	3	2	2.78	47
Bob Veale	38	268 1/3	16	12	3.02	229
Pete Mikkelsen	71	126	9	8	3.07	76
Al McBean	47	86 2/3	4	3	3.22	54
Woodie Fryman	36	181 2/3	12	9	3.81	105
Steve Blass	34	155 2/3	11	7	3.87	76
Vern Law	31	177 2/3	12	8	4.05	88
Tommie Sisk	34	150	10	5	4.14	60
Luke Walker	10	10	0	1	4.50	7
Don Cardwell	32	101 2/3	6	6	4.60	60
Jim Shellenback	2	3	0	0	9.00	0
Team totals	162	1,463 1/3	92	70	3.52	898

== Farm system ==
Level	Team	League	Manager
AAA	Columbus Jets	International League	Larry Shepard
AA	Asheville Tourists	Southern League	Harding "Pete" Peterson
A	Raleigh Pirates	Carolina League	Joe Morgan
A	Clinton Pirates	Midwest League	Frank Oceak
A	Gastonia Pirates	Western Carolinas League	Bob Clear
Rookie	Salem Pirates	Appalachian League	George Detore
