= Herb Hippauf =

American baseball player (1939-1995)

- Pitcher
- Born: May 9, 1939; New York City, U.S.
- Died: July 17, 1995 (aged 56); Santa Clara, California, U.S.
- Batted: Right Threw: Left

MLB debut
- April 27, 1966, for the Atlanta Braves

Last MLB appearance
- May 3, 1966, for the Atlanta Braves

MLB statistics
- Win–loss record: 0–1
- Earned run average: 13.50
- Innings pitched: 2 2/3
- Stats at Baseball Reference

Teams
- Atlanta Braves (1966)

Herbert August Hippauf (May 9, 1939 – July 17, 1995) was an American professional baseball player and scout. A native of New York City, Hippauf the player was a left-handed pitcher who stood 6 feet (1.8 m) tall and weighed 180 pounds (82 kg). His seven-year pro career (1960–1966) was highlighted by a brief, three-game trial with the 1966 Atlanta Braves of Major League Baseball.

Hippauf spent his entire playing career in the Braves' organization, signing with them while they were still based in Milwaukee but not making the varsity until their first year in Atlanta in 1966. During that season, he appeared in relief for the Braves in three early season games. In his MLB debut on April 27, Hippauf relieved starting pitcher Hank Fischer in the third inning of a scoreless game against the Los Angeles Dodgers at Dodger Stadium. He got through the third inning unscathed, but in the fourth, Hippauf surrendered four hits and three earned runs and was charged with his only Major League decision, a loss, as the Dodgers won 4–1. He relieved in two more games in early May before being sent to the Triple-A Richmond Braves, where he played the rest of the season, his last in pro ball. All told, Hippauf yielded six hits and four earned runs in 2 2/3 Major League innings, with one base on balls and one strikeout.

Hippauf remained in baseball for many years, however, as a scout based in Sunnyvale, California, for the Braves, Houston Astros, Montreal Expos and Colorado Rockies. He was a national cross-checker for the Rockies when he died from cancer at age 56 in 1995. The Herb Hippauf Scouting Award, given in his memory, goes annually to the "individual who exemplifies loyalty, dedication, honesty, and is committed to doing what is in the best interest of the Colorado Rockies."
