= Billy Murphy (baseball) =

American baseball player (1944–2024)

Bill Murphy
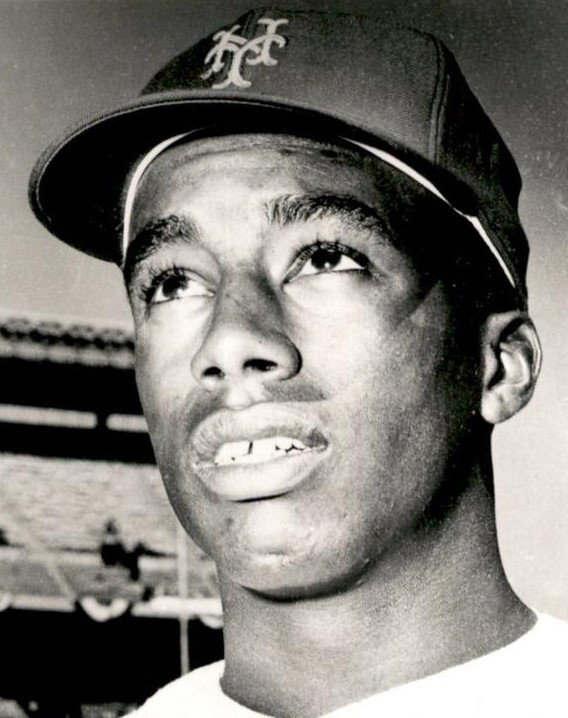
- Outfielder
- Born: May 7, 1944; Winnfield, Louisiana, U.S.
- Died: May 13, 2024 (aged 80); Tacoma, Washington, U.S.
- Batted: Right Threw: Right

MLB debut
- April 16, 1966, for the New York Mets

Last MLB appearance
- September 5, 1966, for the New York Mets

MLB statistics
- Batting average: .230
- Home runs: 3
- Runs batted in: 13
- Stats at Baseball Reference

Teams
- New York Mets (1966)

William Eugene Murphy (May 7, 1944 – May 13, 2024) was an American Major League Baseball outfielder. He played in 84 games for the New York Mets in 1966, mostly as a center fielder and a pinch hitter. He had a batting average of .230 in 135 at bats, with 3 home runs and 13 runs batted in.

Murphy signed with the New York Yankees as an amateur free agent in 1962. He was drafted by the Mets after the 1965 season in the Rule 5 Draft, after four seasons in the Yankees minor league system.
