= Darrell Osteen =

American baseball player (1943–2017)

- Pitcher
- Born: February 14, 1943; Oklahoma City, Oklahoma, U.S.
- Died: October 22, 2017 (aged 74); Palm Desert, California, U.S.
- Batted: Right Threw: Right

MLB debut
- September 2, 1965, for the Cincinnati Reds

Last MLB appearance
- July 19, 1970, for the Oakland Athletics

MLB statistics
- Win–loss record: 1–4
- Earned run average: 8.05
- Innings pitched: 38
- Stats at Baseball Reference

Teams
- Cincinnati Reds (1965–1967); Oakland Athletics (1970)

Milton Darrell Osteen (February 14, 1943 – October 22, 2017) was an American professional baseball player for the Cincinnati Reds and the Oakland Athletics from 1965 to 1970. A right-handed pitcher, he was signed as an amateur free agent in 1962 by the Reds, and was traded to the Athletics on November 21, 1967. He was listed at 6 feet 1 inch (1.85 m) tall and 170 pounds (77 kg).

== Career ==
He was a graduate of Putnam City High School in Oklahoma City, Oklahoma, where he was named 1961 Player of the Year in the Oklahoma City area.

Osteen's professional career extended from 1962 to 1967 and 1970–1971. He made his major league debut on September 2, 1965 against the Braves in Cincinnati's Crosley Field, relieving Gerry Arrigo and pitching two scoreless innings in a 4–3 Reds loss. The first batter he faced was opposing starting pitcher Hank Fischer, who grounded out. Osteen was traded with Rob Gardner from the Oakland Athletics to the New York Yankees for Curt Blefary on May 25, 1971.

He served in the military in 1968 and 1969. In parts of four Major League seasons, he pitched in 29 games and had a 1–4 record with an 8.05 earned run average.
