= Len Church =

American baseball player (1942–1988)

- Pitcher
- Born: March 21, 1942; Chicago, Illinois, U.S.
- Died: April 22, 1988 (aged 46); Richardson, Texas, U.S.
- Batted: Both Threw: Right

MLB debut
- August 27, 1966, for the Chicago Cubs

Last MLB appearance
- September 4, 1966, for the Chicago Cubs

MLB statistics
- Win–loss record: 0–1
- Earned run average: 7.50
- Strikeouts: 3

Teams
- Chicago Cubs (1966)

Leonard Church (March 21, 1942 – April 22, 1988) was a pitcher in Major League Baseball for the Chicago Cubs. A student at Lane Technical High School in Chicago, he was signed as a free agent by the Cubs in 1963.

After spending four seasons in the minors, Church made his MLB debut on August 27, 1966, allowing one run in two innings of work in a 5–4 Cubs loss to Houston. On August 29 and 31, he came into both games in save situations and was the pitcher who surrendered the Cubs' lead, recording a blown save in each case. On August 31, Church surrendered a pinch-hit home run to Cincinnati's Art Shamsky, the first batter he faced, but prior pitcher Curt Simmons was on the hook for the loss due to a player reaching on an error, followed by an intentional walk to the next batter. The Cubs blew a 5–0 lead in the process, losing 7–5.

Church made one more appearance in his MLB career, relieving Bill Hands on September 4 of the same season. He allowed four runs in two innings of work and was charged with the loss as the Cubs lost to Pittsburgh 8–5. For the 1966 season (and his MLB career), Church finished 0–1 with a 7.50 ERA. He played five more seasons in the minor leagues, mostly with the AAA Tacoma Cubs, before hanging up his spikes in 1971 at age 29.

Church died of a heart attack in Richardson, Texas on April 22, 1988.
