= Bill Hepler =

American baseball player (1945–2025)

- Pitcher
- Born: September 25, 1945; Covington, Virginia, U.S.
- Died: August 12, 2025 (aged 79)
- Batted: Left Threw: Left

MLB debut
- April 23, 1966, for the New York Mets

Last MLB appearance
- October 2, 1966, for the New York Mets

MLB statistics
- Win–loss record: 3–3
- Earned run average: 3.52
- Strikeouts: 25
- Stats at Baseball Reference

Teams
- New York Mets (1966)

William Lewis Hepler (September 25, 1945 – August 12, 2025) was an American professional baseball player. He was a left-handed pitcher who was drafted in 1965 by the New York Mets. He played for the Mets for one season before being sent back down to Minor League A-level baseball. He stood 6 feet (1.83 m) tall and weighed 160 pounds (73 kg).

== Biography ==
Hepler was selected in the 1965 Rule 5 draft from the Washington Senators after his debut season in professional ball. He appeared in 37 games played for the 1966 Mets, starting three. He gave up only one earned run in his first ten Major League innings pitched. All told, he worked in 69 innings and allowed 27 earned runs and 71 hits during the season, issuing 51 bases on balls and striking out 25.

He returned to the minor leagues in 1967 and concluded his playing career after the 1970 season.

Hepler died on August 12, 2025, at the age of 79.
