= Joe Verbanic =

American baseball player (born 1943)

- Pitcher
- Born: April 24, 1943 (age 83); Washington, Pennsylvania, U.S.
- Batted: Right Threw: Right

MLB debut
- July 22, 1966, for the Philadelphia Phillies

Last MLB appearance
- May 9, 1970, for the New York Yankees

MLB statistics
- Win–loss record: 12–11
- Earned run average: 3.26
- Strikeouts: 94
- Stats at Baseball Reference

Teams
- Philadelphia Phillies (1966); New York Yankees (1967–1968, 1970)

Joseph Michael Verbanic (born April 24, 1943) is an American former professional baseball right-handed pitcher, who appeared in 92 career games in Major League Baseball (MLB) for the 1966 Philadelphia Phillies and the 1967–1968 and 1970 New York Yankees. He was listed as 6 feet (1.8 m) tall and 155 pounds (70 kg).

== Biography ==
Verbanic was signed by the Phillies in 1961 after attending Hopewell High School (Pennsylvania). After compiling an 8–1 record in the Triple-A Pacific Coast League over the first three months of 1966, he was summoned to Philadelphia to work out of the bullpen. Verbanic appeared in 17 games, all in relief, split two decisions, and posted an earned run average (ERA) of 5.14. That December he was traded to the Yankees for veteran right-handed pitcher Pedro Ramos.

Verbanic began 1967 with Triple-A Syracuse but was recalled to New York in June. Inserted into the Yankees' starting rotation, he won his first two games, throwing a complete game shutout in his second start of the season, against the Washington Senators at Yankee Stadium. In that June 8, 1967, contest, Verbanic allowed only four hits and one base on balls, and struck out five. He also went 2-for-3 at the plate, with a double, a sacrifice bunt, and two runs batted in (RBI). Verbanic finished the year 4–3 and two saves, and a 2.80 earned run average, in 28 games.

Verbanic then spent all of 1968 with the Yankees, working in 40 games (29 in relief). In a starting role on September 10, he threw his second and last career complete-game shutout, blanking the Chicago White Sox on five hits, again at Yankee Stadium. For the year, he won six games (losing seven), saved four games, and compiled an ERA of 3.15. But Verbanic then missed all of the 1969 season with arm trouble.

Verbanic was able to return to the Yankees in early 1970, and notched his final MLB win in relief over the Baltimore Orioles on April 19. But he was sent back to Syracuse after May 9, and never again appeared in a major-league game. In his 92 appearances and 207 total innings pitched, he allowed 210 hits and 84 bases on balls with 94 strikeouts. Verbanic had a 12–11 career record with six saves and an earned run average of 3.26.

Verbanic rejoined the Phillies' organization in his final pro season, 1972, pitching for Triple-A Eugene, and later settled in that Oregon city.
