= Terry Fox (baseball) =

American baseball player (born 1935)

- Pitcher
- Born: July 31, 1935 (age 91); Chicago, Illinois, U.S.
- Batted: Right Threw: Right

MLB debut
- September 4, 1960, for the Milwaukee Braves

Last MLB appearance
- September 25, 1966, for the Philadelphia Phillies

MLB statistics
- Win–loss record: 29–19
- Earned run average: 2.99
- Strikeouts: 185
- Saves: 59
- Stats at Baseball Reference

Teams
- Milwaukee Braves (1960); Detroit Tigers (1961–1966); Philadelphia Phillies (1966)

Terrence Edward Fox (born July 31, 1935) is an American former right-handed Major League Baseball relief pitcher/closer who played seven MLB seasons from 1960 to 1966 for the Milwaukee Braves, Detroit Tigers and Philadelphia Phillies.

Fox played at Thornton Township High School in Harvey, Illinois, graduating in 1953. He signed with the Braves organization before the 1956 season. He made his MLB debut for the Braves on September 4, 1960, pitching two-thirds of an inning against the Cincinnati Reds. He pitched in a total of 5 games for the Braves in his rookie season, posting a 4.32 ERA.

In December 1960, he was traded along with Dick Brown, Bill Bruton and Chuck Cottier from the Braves to the Tigers for Frank Bolling and Neil Chrisley. Serving as the team's closer in 1961 and 1962, he led the team in ERA while finishing in the top 5 of saves in the AL. He is also notable for giving up Roger Maris' 58th home run of 1961.

He continued as the team's closer through 1965, paving the team in saves each year. However, he was sold to the Phillies in 1966 after posting a paltry 6.30 ERA in his first 4 games. In his final 36 games with them that season, he posted a 4.47 ERA.

Overall, he went 29–19 in his career with 59 saves and a 2.99 ERA. As a batter, he struck out in 40 of his 65 career at-bats, batting just .123 (3 of his 8 career hits were for extra-bases, though). He committed 7 errors in his career for a .942 fielding percentage.

== See also ==
- Best pitching seasons by a Detroit Tiger
