= Ted Davidson =

American baseball player (1939–2006)

- Pitcher
- Born: October 4, 1939; Las Vegas, Nevada, U.S.
- Died: September 1, 2006 (aged 66); Bullhead City, Arizona, U.S.
- Batted: Right Threw: Left

MLB debut
- July 24, 1965, for the Cincinnati Reds

Last MLB appearance
- July 28, 1968, for the Atlanta Braves

MLB statistics
- Win–loss record: 11–7
- Earned run average: 3.69
- Strikeouts: 124
- Stats at Baseball Reference

Teams
- Cincinnati Reds (1965–1968); Atlanta Braves (1968)

Thomas Eugene Davidson (October 4, 1939 – September 1, 2006) was an American professional baseball player. He was a left-handed Major League Baseball relief pitcher from 1965 to 1968 for the Cincinnati Reds and Atlanta Braves. He was called "Ted" after the initials of his first, middle, and last names.

After attending Allan Hancock College in Santa Maria, California, he was signed by the Reds as an amateur free agent in 1960 and made his Major League debut at age 25 on July 24, 1965. In a 4–2 Reds loss to the Houston Astros at the Astrodome, Davidson relieved Reds pitcher Jim Duffalo with two outs and immediately induced future Baseball Hall of Famer Joe Morgan to ground into a double play. In his first game, Davidson pitched 2 2/3 innings, giving up no runs and striking out four batters.

Apart from one start during his rookie 1965 season, Davidson was used as a left-handed relief specialist.

After a solid 1966 season, Davidson nearly lost his life in March 1967 after his estranged wife confronted him in a bar and shot him three times with a small-caliber pistol, once in the left abdomen and twice in the right chest. At the time, it was reported that Davidson's wife was to be charged with assault to commit murder. However, the charge was dismissed when Ted Davidson failed to appear in court on two occasions, the last time being April 25, 1967 (at which time both Mary Ruth Davidson and her attorney did appear). Davidson recovered from his wounds and was back playing by June of the same year but his effectiveness was not the same as it was prior to the shooting.

He was traded along with Milt Pappas and Bob Johnson by the Reds to the Atlanta Braves for Tony Cloninger, Clay Carroll and Woody Woodward on June 11, 1968.

In 34 career plate appearances, Davidson failed to register a hit, striking out 19 times.

He died at age 66 on September 1, 2006, in Bullhead City, Arizona.
