= Al Jackson =

American baseball player (1935–2019)

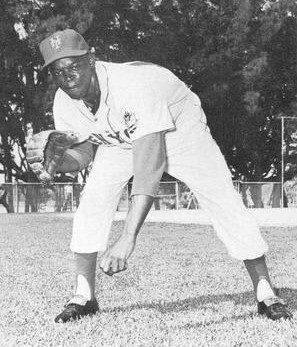
- Jackson in 1963
- Pitcher
- Born: December 26, 1935; Waco, Texas, U.S.
- Died: August 19, 2019 (aged 83); Port St. Lucie, Florida, U.S.
- Batted: Left Threw: Left

MLB debut
- May 31, 1959, for the Pittsburgh Pirates

Last MLB appearance
- September 26, 1969, for the Cincinnati Reds

MLB statistics
- Win–loss record: 67–99
- Earned run average: 3.98
- Strikeouts: 738
- Stats at Baseball Reference

Teams
- As player: Pittsburgh Pirates (1959, 1961); New York Mets (1962–1965); St. Louis Cardinals (1966–1967); New York Mets (1968–1969); Cincinnati Reds (1969); As coach: Boston Red Sox (1977–1979); Baltimore Orioles (1989–1991); New York Mets (1999–2000)

Alvin Neill Jackson (December 26, 1935 – August 19, 2019), affectionately referred to as "Little" Al Jackson, was an American left-handed pitcher in Major League Baseball who played from 1959 to 1969. His 43 wins with the New York Mets were the franchise record until Tom Seaver eased past the mark in 1969. In July 2021, he was posthumously honored with the New York Mets Hall of Fame Achievement Award for his 50 years of service to the franchise.

== Career ==
Listed at 5 feet 10 inches (1.78 m), 169 pounds (77 kg), Jackson was born in Waco, Texas, and attended Wiley College. He was signed by the Pittsburgh Pirates as an amateur free agent in 1955 but his first regular major league experience came as a member of the inaugural 1962 New York Mets. As a starting pitcher, he posted an 8–20 record that year. The 40–120 record of those 1962 Mets continues to be the most losses by a Major League team in a single season since the 19th Century. On August 14, 1962, Jackson pitched a complete game 3–1 loss to the Philadelphia Phillies in 4 hours 35 minutes – the longest complete game in terms of playing time in Major League history.

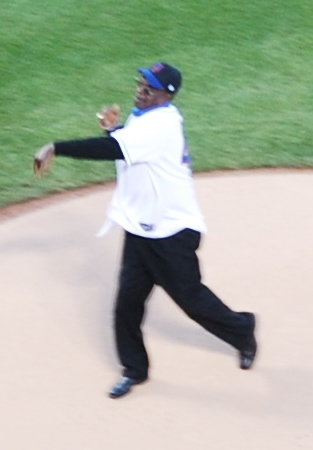
Jackson throwing out the first pitch on Jackie Robinson Day at Citi Field in 2010.

After three more seasons of sixteen or more losses with the Mets, including a second 8–20 campaign, Jackson was traded to the St. Louis Cardinals for Ken Boyer. In 1966, his first year in St. Louis, Jackson had his best season in the majors. He was sixth in the National League in earned run average and ninth in complete games. Unfortunately for Jackson, he also lost fifteen games and, the next year, was used more as a relief pitcher. Those 15 losses gave him a five-year streak of at least 15 losses—the record since 1900 is six. Despite going 9–4 in 1967, he did not see action in the 1967 World Series. Still, as a member of the world champion Cardinals, he earned a World Series ring.

After the 1967 season, Jackson was traded back to the Mets for pitcher Jack Lamabe and continued pitching out of the bullpen. He was with the "Miracle" Mets of 1969 but was sold to the Cincinnati Reds in June after compiling an ERA over ten, and did not play in a postseason.

Jackson pitched 33 games for the Reds in relief to finish 1969. Before he played a game in 1970, the Reds released him and his career was over.

In addition to his 43 wins as a Met, Jackson's franchise record of 10 shutouts was also broken by Seaver. Two of them (July 27, 1962, and October 2, 1964) were 1–0 wins over Bob Gibson—the Mets' first two victories over the future Hall-of-Famer and the only two times the Mets defeated him between 1962 and 1966. He threw a one-hitter on June 22, 1962, against the Houston Colt .45s (who joined the National League, along with the Mets, during the 1962 season), the first in Mets' history. The lone hit was by Joey Amalfitano in the first inning.

After his playing days, Jackson fashioned a two-decades-plus-long career as a coach, serving as a pitching mentor at the big-league level with the Boston Red Sox (1977–79) under former Met teammate Don Zimmer and the Baltimore Orioles (1989–91) under Frank Robinson and Johnny Oates. However, he spent most of his tenure as a minor league instructor with the Mets, and was a member of Bobby Valentine's MLB staff in 1999–2000.

== Personal life ==
Al Jackson and his wife Nadine had two sons Reggie (Fisk '80) and Barry (Howard '84) and two grandsons Wesley Jackson and Kyle Jackson. He served as an elder in a Presbyterian church. Jackson died on the morning of August 19, 2019, after a long illness at The Emerald Nursing Home in Port St. Lucie, Florida. He was 83.

| Preceded by Stan Williams | Boston Red Sox pitching coach 1977–1979 | Succeeded by Johnny Podres |
| Preceded by Herm Starrette | Baltimore Orioles pitching coach 1989–1991 | Succeeded by Dick Bosman |
