= 1966 Major League Baseball All-Star Game =

1966 American baseball competition

	1	2	3	4	5	6	7	8	9	10	R	H	E
American League	0	1	0	0	0	0	0	0	0	0	1	6	0
National League	0	0	0	1	0	0	0	0	0	1	2	6	0
- Date: July 12, 1966
- Venue: Busch Memorial Stadium
- City: Saint Louis, Missouri
- Managers: Sam Mele (MIN); Walter Alston (LAD)
- MVP: Brooks Robinson (BAL)
- Attendance: 50,000 (49,936)
- Ceremonial first pitch: Vice President Hubert Humphrey
- Television: NBC
- TV announcers: Curt Gowdy and Pee Wee Reese
- Radio: NBC
- Radio announcers: Jim Simpson and Tony Kubek

The 1966 Major League Baseball All-Star Game was the 37th midseason exhibition between the all-stars of the American League (AL) and the National League (NL), the two leagues comprising Major League Baseball. The game was played on July 12, 1966, at then-new Busch Memorial Stadium in St. Louis, Missouri, home of the St. Louis Cardinals of the National League.

The game featured 19 future Hall of Famers, 13 of whom were on the National League team. The 10-inning contest – which was played on a memorably hot and humid afternoon in St. Louis, with a game-time temperature of 103 °F (39 °C) – resulted in a 2–1 victory for the NL.

== Game summary ==
The teams managed just six hits apiece in a 10-inning game. A triple by Brooks Robinson in the second inning off Sandy Koufax was followed by a wild pitch, giving the American Leaguers a 1–0 lead. It turned out to be their only run.

The NL tied the score in the fourth against Jim Kaat on singles by Willie Mays, Roberto Clemente and Ron Santo. There would be no more runs until the 10th. Winning pitcher Gaylord Perry got out of a two-on, one-out jam by retiring Bobby Richardson on a pop foul and Bill Freehan with a strikeout. Pete Richert, pitching the bottom of the 10th, surrendered a base hit to Tim McCarver, a sacrifice bunt by Ron Hunt and a walk-off single to center by Maury Wills.

Playing the entire 10 innings at third base and getting three of his team's six hits, Brooks Robinson was named the game's most valuable player, even though he was on the losing side.

== American League roster ==
The American League roster included 8 future Hall of Fame players.

=== Pitchers ===
Throws	Pitcher	Team	Notes
P	Steve Barber	Orioles
P	Gary Bell	Indians
P	Catfish Hunter	Athletics
P	Jim Kaat	Twins
P	Sam McDowell	Indians	injured
P	Denny McLain	Tigers	starter
P	Pete Richert	Senators
P	Sonny Siebert	Indians	replaced McDowell
P	Mel Stottlemyre	Yankees

=== Position players ===
Position	Player	Team	Notes
C	Earl Battey	Twins
C	Andy Etchebarren	Orioles
C	Bill Freehan	Tigers	starter
1B	Norm Cash	Tigers
1B	George Scott	Red Sox	starter
2B	Bobby Knoop	Angels	starter
2B	Bobby Richardson	Yankees
3B	Harmon Killebrew	Twins
3B	Brooks Robinson	Orioles	starter
SS	Jim Fregosi	Angels
SS	Dick McAuliffe	Tigers	starter
OF	Tommie Agee	White Sox
OF	Rocky Colavito	Indians
OF	Al Kaline	Tigers	starter
OF	Tony Oliva	Twins	starter
OF	Frank Robinson	Orioles	starter
OF	Carl Yastrzemski	Red Sox

=== Coaching staff ===
Position	Manager	Team
Manager	Sam Mele	Twins
Coach	Hank Bauer	Orioles
Coach	Birdie Tebbetts	Indians

== National League roster ==
The National League roster included 15 future Hall of Fame players & coaches.

=== Pitchers ===
Throws	Pitcher	Team	Notes
P	Jim Bunning	Phillies
P	Bob Gibson	Cardinals	injured
P	Sandy Koufax	Dodgers	starter
P	Juan Marichal	Giants
P	Billy McCool	Reds
P	Gaylord Perry	Giants
P	Claude Raymond	Astros
P	Phil Regan	Dodgers	replaced Gibson
P	Bob Veale	Pirates

=== Position players ===
Position	Player	Team	Notes
C	Tom Haller	Giants
C	Tim McCarver	Cardinals
C	Joe Torre	Braves	starter
1B	Felipe Alou	Braves
1B	Willie McCovey	Giants	starter
2B	Ron Hunt	Mets
2B	Jim Lefebvre	Dodgers	starter
2B	Joe Morgan	Astros	injured
3B	Jim Ray Hart	Giants
3B	Ron Santo	Cubs	starter
SS	Leo Cárdenas	Reds	starter
SS	Maury Wills	Dodgers
OF	Hank Aaron	Braves	starter
OF	Dick Allen	Phillies
OF	Roberto Clemente	Pirates	starter
OF	Curt Flood	Cardinals
OF	Willie Mays	Giants	starter
OF	Willie Stargell	Pirates

=== Coaching staff ===
Position	Manager	Team
Manager	Walter Alston	Dodgers
Coach	Herman Franks	Giants
Coach	Harry Walker	Pirates

== Game ==
=== Starting lineups ===
American League				National League			
Order	Player	Team	Position	Order	Player	Team	Position
1	Dick McAuliffe	Tigers	SS	1	Willie Mays	Giants	CF
2	Al Kaline	Tigers	CF	2	Roberto Clemente	Pirates	RF
3	Frank Robinson	Orioles	LF	3	Hank Aaron	Braves	LF
4	Tony Oliva	Twins	RF	4	Willie McCovey	Giants	1B
5	Brooks Robinson	Orioles	3B	5	Ron Santo	Cubs	3B
6	George Scott	Red Sox	1B	6	Joe Torre	Braves	C
7	Bill Freehan	Tigers	C	7	Jim Lefebvre	Dodgers	2B
8	Bobby Knoop	Angels	2B	8	Leo Cárdenas	Reds	SS
9	Denny McLain	Tigers	P	9	Sandy Koufax	Dodgers	P

=== Umpires ===
Position	Umpire
Home Plate	Al Barlick (NL)
First Base	Frank Umont (AL)
Second Base	Ed Vargo (NL)
Third Base	Jim Honochick (AL)
Left Field	Bob Engel (NL)
Right Field	Jerry Neudecker (AL)

=== Line score ===
Tuesday, July 12, 1966 1:00 pm (CT) at Busch Memorial Stadium in St. Louis, Missouri
Team	1	2	3	4	5	6	7	8	9	10	R	H	E
American League	0	1	0	0	0	0	0	0	0	0	1	6	0
National League	0	0	0	1	0	0	0	0	0	1	2	6	0
WP: Gaylord Perry (1-0) LP: Pete Richert (0-1)
