= 1967 Houston Astros season =

Sixth season in Major League Baseball for the Houston Astros

1967 Houston Astros
- League: National League
- Ballpark: Astrodome
- City: Houston, Texas
- Record: 69–93 (.426)
- League place: 9th
- Owners: Roy Hofheinz
- General managers: Tal Smith, Spec Richardson
- Managers: Grady Hatton
- Television: KTRK-TV
- Radio: KPRC (AM) (Gene Elston, Loel Passe, Harry Kalas)

The 1967 Houston Astros season was the sixth season for the Major League Baseball (MLB) franchise located in Houston, Texas, their third as the Astros, sixth in the National League (NL), and third at The Astrodome. The Astros entered the season with a 72–90 record, in 8th place and 23 games behind the NL pennant-winning Los Angeles Dodgers.

The Astros commenced the regular season on April 11, hosting the Atlanta Braves. Pitcher Mike Cuellar made the Opening Day start as the Astros were victorious, 6–1. The Astros established a then-franchise record of 23 hits in a single game on June 7. On June 15, 1967, Jimmy Wynn connected for the first three-home run game in franchise history. Don Wilson tossed the third no-hitter in franchise history on June 18 for a 2–0 victory over the Atlanta Braves. The first no-hitter that took place at The Astrodome, it was the first of two no-hitters Wilson pitched for the Astros.

Three Astros were selected to the MLB All-Star Game, including Cuellar, Wynn (center field), and right fielder Rusty Staub. The Astros' first-round selection in the amateur draft was first baseman John Mayberry, at sixth overall. On July 14, Eddie Mathews, in his lone season playing for Houston, became the seventh major leaguer to hit 500 home runs for his career, with this historic blast at Candlestick Park.

The Astros' final regular season record stood at 69–93 for a ninth-place finish in the National League. The fourth time in five seasons that ended in ninth place, Houston finished 32 1/2 games behind the NL pennant and World Series-champion St. Louis Cardinals. Staub and Wynn teamed to establish several club records.

== Offseason ==
=== Summary ===
The Houston Astros concluded the 1966 campaign with a 72–90 (.444) record, ranking eighth in the National League (NL), 23 games behind the NL pennant-winning Los Angeles Dodgers. The Astros won as many as 72 games for the first time, an improvement by seven wins from 1965..

=== Transactions ===
- October 19, 1966: Bob Lillis was released by the Astros.
- November 28, 1966: Bo Belinsky was drafted by the Astros from the Philadelphia Phillies in the 1966 rule 5 draft.
- December 31, 1966: Dave Nicholson and Bob Bruce were traded by the Astros to the Atlanta Braves for Eddie Mathews, Arnold Umbach and a player to be named later. The Braves completed the deal by sending Sandy Alomar Sr. to the Astros on February 25, 1967.
- January 4, 1967: Lee Maye and Ken Retzer were traded by the Astros to the Cleveland Indians for Jim Landis, Jim Weaver, and Doc Edwards.
- March 24, 1967: Sandy Alomar Sr. was traded by the Astros to the New York Mets for Derrell Griffith.

== Regular season ==
=== Summary ===
==== April—May ====
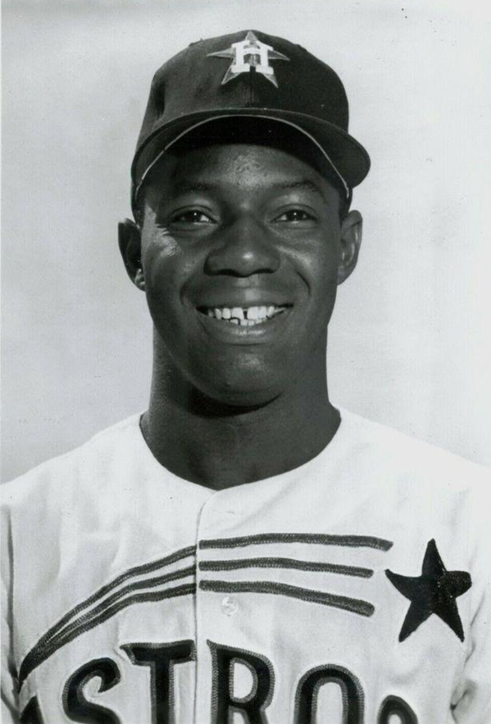
Jimmy Wynn became the first player to reach 30 home runs and 100 RBI for the Houston Astros.

Opening Day starting lineup
Uniform	Player	Position
16	Sonny Jackson	Shortstop
18	Joe Morgan	Second baseman
28	Aaron Pointer	Left fielder
24	Jimmy Wynn	Center fielder
14	Bob Aspromonte	Third baseman
10	Rusty Staub	Right fielder
11	Eddie Mathews	First baseman
7	John Bateman	Catcher
35	Mike Cuellar	Pitcher
Venue: Astrodome • Final: Houston 6, Atlanta 1 Sources:

On Opening Day, April 11, Houston were triumphant over the Atlanta Braves, 6–1. Clete Boyer homered off Astros Opening Day starter Mike Cuellar in the top of the seventh, which broke a scoreless tie. During the bottom of the seventh, newcomer and former Brave, Eddie Mathews, greeted his old club with a run batted in (RBI) triple that scored Bob Aspromonte to tie the score, 1–1. The Astros tallied five more during the frame, including Cuellar's RBI single to plate batterymate John Bateman. Cuellar earned the complete game victory, yielding five hits with no base on balls and seven strikeouts. Houston earned just their second Opening Day victory since franchise inauguration day, 1962.

Tensions arose during the May 18 contest versus the San Francisco Giants. A riot nearly ensued in the first inning when the Astros' Jimmy Wynn connected for a home run that struck the foul pole. Giants manager Herman Franks and umpire Shag Crawford nearly were in agreement that the ball traveled foul. However, tensions escalated again when Ollie Brown was ejected for something that he had not said. After the fracas that transpired, the Astros emerged with the win, 6–2.

With winds blowing out at Wrigley Field on May 26, Houston won over the Chicago Cubs, 7–4. The Astros' Wynn, Rusty Staub, Joe Morgan, and Ron Davis each connected for home runs. At one point, in spite of being hit by a pitch, the Astros' John Bateman was permitted to remain in the batter's box and keep trying for a home run of his own.

==== Early June ====
The Astros collected a then-franchise record of 23 hits on June 7. (Note: Surpassed on May 30, 1976, versus Atlanta. Criteria: For single games, from 1962 to 1976, for HOU, in the regular season, requiring hits ≥18, sorted by descending hits.) Led by Bob Aspromonte, the Astros' 17–1 win over the St. Louis Cardinals accounted for a new record for largest margin of victory in franchise history. Aspromonte had a 5-hit day, while catcher Ron Brand collected four. This record maintained until 2019.

While at Crosley Field in his hometown of Cincinnati on June 10, Jimmy Wynn walloped the first of a pair of memorable home runs that cleared the 58 feet (18 m) scoreboard in left-center field. The first, off Mel Queen during the eighth inning, landed on Interstate 75. Wynn reprised the drive the following day, off Sammy Ellis with similar arc and direction during the third inning. The ball landed onto the highway ramp, came to rest an estimated 600 feet (180 m) from home plate, while posting the Astros to a 3–1 advantage. However, the upstart Reds rallied, capped by Don Pavletich's walk-off grand slam that catalyzed an 8–4 Cincinnati triumph. (Footage of Wynn's tape-measure blast on June 11, 1967).

Rookie right-hander Don Wilson struck out 13 Giants on June 14 to lead a 7–4 complete game victory. He scattered eight hits while surrendering just one earned run. This also was the first outing of Wilson's career in which he reached double-figures in strikeouts. In just his next start, Wilson would establish another new personal-best.

On June 15, 1967, Wynn hit three solo home runs against San Francisco to lead to a 6–2 win. This was the first three-home run game by an Astros hitter in franchise history. (Note: Wynn's achievement was next equaled by Lee May on June 21, 1973.) This achievement was also not repeated at the Astrodome until 1994. (Note: By Jeff Bagwell on June 24, 1994.) Moments before the trade deadline on June 15, the Astros sent Claude Raymond to the Atlanta Braves for Wade Blasingame. The following day, Raymond earned the save in the Braves' 9–8 win over the Astros.

On June 17, Mathews swatted a walk-off home run leading off the ninth inning against the Braves off former Colt .45/Astro Bob Bruce to seal a 4–3 Astros triumph. Going into the ninth, Houston's Dave Giusti took a shutout bid with a 3–0 lead. However, Woody Woodward singled in Denis Menke and Mike de la Hoz belted a game-tying home run. Wade Blasingame (2–0) retired Tito Francona on a lineout to end the rally just before Mathews connected for his fifth home run of the season.

==== Don Wilson's no-hitter ====
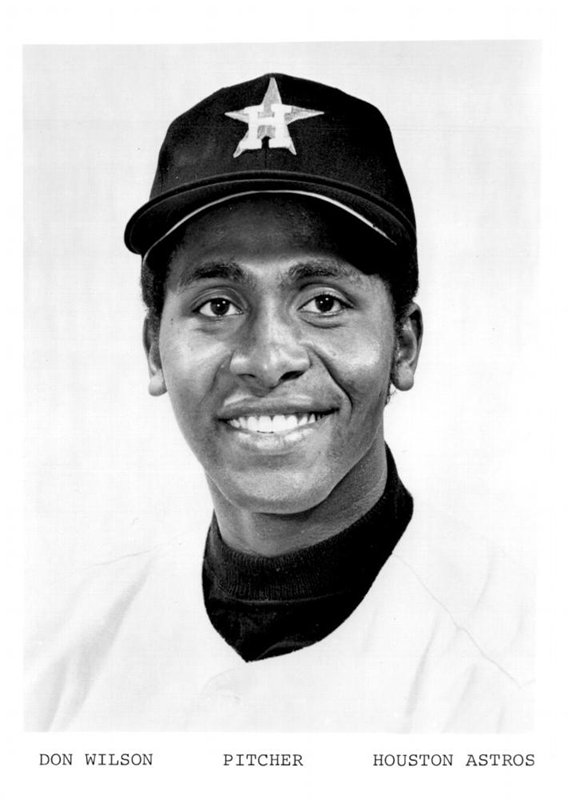
Don Wilson threw the first no-hitter indoors.

Don Wilson no-hit the Atlanta Braves on June 18 to spearhead a 2–0 win. He fanned Hank Aaron for the final out of this masterpiece. The third no-hitter in franchise history, it was the first Astros' no hitter to end as a shutout, and the first pitched at The Astrodome. It was also the first of two no-hitters that Wilson pitched for Houston, the first Astro to accomplish this feat.

Wilson retired 7 of the first 14 hitters via strikeout. Opposite Wilson was the 28-year-old Phil Niekro, who was making his third career start, and coming off a two-hit shutout of the Philadelphia Phillies. Niekro had been a relief pitcher since his debut in 1964. Though the Astros collected two hits off Niekro in the first inning, he closed out the frame without blemish. Houston scored twice in the bottom of the fourth when Jim Wynn doubled home Sonny Jackson for his 48th RBI. The run broke a 14 1/3 scoreless innings streak that Niekro had fabricated. Staub followed by singling in Wynn to stake Houston to a 2–0 lead.

Wilson's perfect game bid expired during the top of the fifth inning when he issued a two-out base on balls to Denis Menke. With two outs in the top of the sixth inning, Aspromonte collared the defensive gem of the contest. Felipe Alou smashed a rocket to Aspromonte's left, which he speared, and shifted to his knees to deliver a perfect strike to Mathews at first base. Joseph Heiling of the Houston Post delineated Aspromonte's reflex as “sprawled out on his stomach like a camper who has tripped on a log.”

During the top of the seventh, Wilson issued a one-out walk to Hank Aaron on a full count. Wilson then whiffed Mack Jones and induced a fly ball out to center field from Mike de la Hoz. Wilson then struck out the side outfitted with three consecutive pinch hitters in the eighth inning.

Wilson, who fanned Aaron swinging on a full-count during the top of the ninth to end the contest, registered 15 strikeouts to tie Cuellar's club record set nearly one year prior on June 25, 1966. Wilson's 15 punchouts wiped out his career-high of 13 set in just his prior start against San Francisco. It was the first of three performances of 15 or more strikeouts by Wilson during his career. Wilson fanned 15 of 30 batters faced, including thrice each versus the trio Tito Francona, Aaron, and Jones during this bout. Willson registered a game score of 99.

==== Rest of June ====
On June 19, Julio Gotay authored a 5-for-5 day, including delivering the game-tying RBI to send the contest into extra innings. However, the St. Louis Cardinals prevailed, 5–4, in 11 innings. Gotay had replaced Joe Morgan on the roster while he was on military leave.

On June 25, Larry Dierker's 1967 season concluded early as he began serving a six-month tour in the Army Reserve.

From June 30 to July 21, Staub recorded the first-ever hitting streak of 20 games in franchise history, also his best period of hitting on the season, represented with a .423 batting average and 10 doubles. Staub's hitting streak broke the club record set during the inaugural season of 1962 when Román Mejías hit in 16 consecutively from May 25–June 10 of that year, and remained as the record stood until June 22, 1973, when Lee May collected a hit in 21 straight contests.

During the month of June, Jimmy Wynn clubbed 11 home runs and 29 runs batted in, setting a monthly RBI record which surpassed 28 by Bob Aspromonte in August of the previous campaign. (Note: In September—October 1977, Bob Watson surpassed this record by becoming the first Astros player to collect 30 or more RBI during any calendar month. Criteria: In the regular season, from 1962 to 1977, playing for HOU, for any choice in months, requiring runs batted in ≥ 28, sorted by lowest year.)

==== Early July ====
On July 8, Eddie Mathews hit the 499th home run of his career, and Wynn added a home run to lead a 3–1 victory over the Cubs. Both of the blasts were in the sixth inning off Cubs right-hander Ray Culp. The Astros followed up that effort with a 6–0 shutout, which sealed a four-game sweep of Chicago prior to the All-Star break. The Astros ended their first half with a record of 33–50 (.398).

==== MLB All-Star Game ====
For the first time, three Astros were selected to represent the team at the MLB All-Star Game, hosted at Anaheim Stadium. The three were pitcher Mike Cuellar, and outfielders Jimmy Wynn and Rusty Staub. Moreover, Wynn and Staub became the first two Astros players to log base hits in an All-Star Game. Wynn's safety preceded Staub's, as both were called on to pinch hit in the pitcher's spot in the lineup. Wynn was substituted in for Bob Gibson, and led off the top of the ninth with a single off Al Downing. In the top of the 11th, Staub banged a single in place of Chris Short off Catfish Hunter.

==== Eddie Mathews' 500th home run ====
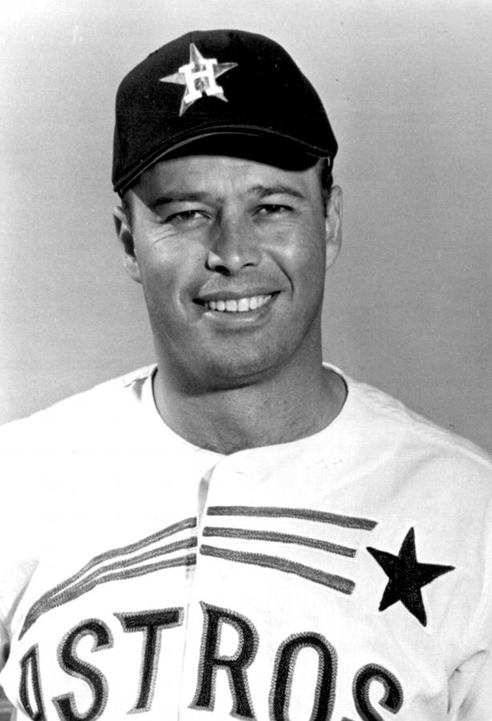
Photocard of Eddie Mathews as a member of the Astros in 1967.

Batting fifth in the order on July 14, Eddie Mathews connected for his 500th career home run. The historic drive was a three-run home run in the sixth inning at Candlestick Park off fellow future Hall of Famer Juan Marichal, leading an 8–6 victory over San Francisco. Staub and Wynn singled ahead of Mathews for the runners that he'd drive in. Later in the sixth inning, Houston starting pitcher Dave Giusti added a triple to drive in Norm Miller. Staub was 3-for-4 with two runs scored that game and Wynn scored three times. Mathews became the first player to reach the milestone in the Houston Astros uniform, and seventh major leaguer all-time, preceded by Jimmie Foxx, Mickey Mantle, Willie Mays, (Note: Mays hit his milestone home run off the Astros' Don Nottebart on September 13, 1965.) Mel Ott, Babe Ruth, and Ted Williams. The first 493 home runs of Mathews' illustrious career arrived during his first 15 seasons as a member of the Boston / Milwaukee / Atlanta Braves organization.

Mickey Mantle had most recently reached 500 home runs, on May 14, 1967, two months before Mathews. Mathews’ former Braves teammate Hank Aaron was the next player to reach the milestone, on July 14, 1968.

Marichal became the first—and remained the only—future Hall of Fame moundsman to have surrendered a milestone 500th home run (through 2025).

==== Later July ====
Jim Wynn clubbed two home runs on July 23 during the opener of a doublehaader versus the Pittsburgh Pirates, which the two clubs split. One home run was a monstrous three-run blast that landed on the Little League diamond located at the back of Forbes Field. The Triple Crown leaders at the end of the day resided in Houston: Wynn (25 home runs, 75 RBI), and Staub (.358 batting average). However, as a team, the Astros occupied last place.

On July 24, Mike Cuellar established the Astros' franchise record with a 101 game score against Philadelphia, eclipsing Turk Farrell's masterpiece of 99 on April 12, 1963, and his own personal best of 97 on July 1, 1966. (Note: For single games, from 1962 to 2025, playing for HOU, in the regular season, sorted by descending Game Score.) Decided via walk-off with two outs in the bottom of the 11th inning, Cuellar (10–6) went the distance while scoring the winning run on Jimmy Wynn's single with two outs off Dick Hall in Houston's 2–1 triumph. Cuellar struck out 12 Phillies while surrendering just two hits and two walks. Philadelphia tallied their only run during the ninth when Mathews' throwing error allowed Tony Taylor to scurry home for an unearned run. However, it was Mathews' sacrifice fly in the bottom of the seventh that opened the scoring for Houston.

During the month of July, Wynn socked another 9 home runs, and followed up his record-setting 29 RBI in June with 28 RBI in July.

==== August—September ====
To give Mathews the opportunity to conclude the season with a contender, on August 17, Astros general manager Spec Richardson traded him to the Detroit Tigers, who wound up second in that year's American League (AL) pennant chase.

Wynn drilled his 30th home run on August 23, becoming the first Astros hitter to reach the milestone in a single campaign. He took a Clay Carroll offering deep but Atlanta proved too much, defeating Houston, 9–3. Wynn remained the lone Astros player to actualize the feat until Glenn Davis in 1986.

On September 9, at Dodger Stadium, Wynn reached another new frontier with 100 RBI, with a home runs versus Claude Osteen, the first Astro to reach the milestone. Wynn also extended his then-club record with his 34th and 35th home runs to lead a 5–3 triumph over Los Angeles. Cuellar picked up his 14th victory.

On September 27, Mike Cuellar (16–11) dueled with Jim Bunning (17–15) of the Philadelphia Phillies for more than 10 shutout innings each. In the bottom of the eleventh, Rusty Staub doubled. Next, Chuck Harrison singled home Staub for the walk-off run and 1–0 Astros victory. This was Harrison's second consecutive walk-off hit, succeeding a walk-off home run. Bunning, meanwhile, received a record-tying fifth 1–0 shutout defeat for the season. Just 3,616 fans were hosted, the fewest since the opening of the Astrodome, as St. Louis had already clinched the pennant. This was Cuellar's fifth career game of 12 strikeouts or more, and his second complete game of the season of 11 innings pitched.

During the penultimate contest of the season on September 30, rookie Bob Watson walloped his first major league home, a two-run blast off Jim Shellenback. This was a clutch drive, game-tying in an eventual 4–3 Houston triumph.

==== Performance overview ====
As a team, Houston led the National League in doubles (259), ranked second in on-base percentage (.317 OBP), fourth in hits (1372), sixth in runs scored (626), second in bases on balls (537) and third in stolen bases (88). This was the third consecutive campaign that they ranked third in steals, while ranking their highest-to-date in each of the other aforementioned categories.

Wynn established club records with 37 home runs and 107 runs batted in (RBI). Staub established other single-season club records, including a .333 batting average, a major-league leading 44 doubles, 182 hits, and 21 intentional bases on balls (IBB). He became the first Astro to lead both their assigned league in doubles as well as all of baseball. Additionally, Staub was recognized as the Astros' team Most Valuable Player (MVP), also the first player to be recognized both in consecutive years and more than once.

Mike Cuellar equaled Turk Farrell's single-season club record for strikeouts with 203, first set in 1962. The record was surpassed by Don Wilson (235) and Dierker (232) in 1969. (Note: For single seasons, playing for HOU, in the regular season, requiring strikeouts ≥ 200, sorted by ascending season.)

=== League standings ===
National League
Team	W	L	Pct.	GB	Home	Road
St. Louis Cardinals	101	60	.627	—	49‍–‍32	52‍–‍28
San Francisco Giants	91	71	.562	10½	51‍–‍31	40‍–‍40
Chicago Cubs	87	74	.540	14	49‍–‍34	38‍–‍40
Cincinnati Reds	87	75	.537	14½	49‍–‍32	38‍–‍43
Philadelphia Phillies	82	80	.506	19½	45‍–‍35	37‍–‍45
Pittsburgh Pirates	81	81	.500	20½	49‍–‍32	32‍–‍49
Atlanta Braves	77	85	.475	24½	48‍–‍33	29‍–‍52
Los Angeles Dodgers	73	89	.451	28½	42‍–‍39	31‍–‍50
Houston Astros	69	93	.426	32½	46‍–‍35	23‍–‍58
New York Mets	61	101	.377	40½	36‍–‍42	25‍–‍59

=== Record vs. opponents ===
National League

1967 National League record Sources:
Team	ATL	CHC	CIN	HOU	LAD	NYM	PHI	PIT	SF	STL
Atlanta	—	11–7	5–13	11–7	8–10	8–10	10–8	8–10	10–8	6–12
Chicago	7–11	—	12–6	8–10	9–9	13–5	11–7	11–7–1	10–8	6–11
Cincinnati	13–5	6–12	—	15–3	8–10	12–6	10–8	10–8	8–10	5–13
Houston	7–11	10–8	3–15	—	10–8	11–7	7–11	9–9	6–12	6–12
Los Angeles	10–8	9–9	10–8	8–10	—	12–6	6–12	7–11	5–13	6–12
New York	10–8	5–13	6–12	7–11	6–12	—	4–14	11–7	5–13	7–11
Philadelphia	7–11	7–11	8–10	11–7	12–6	14–4	—	8–10	8–10	6–12
Pittsburgh	10–8	7–11–1	8–10	9–9	11–7	7–11	10–8	—	8–10	11–7
San Francisco	8–10	8–10	10–8	12–6	13–5	13–5	10–8	10–8	—	7–11
St. Louis	12–6	11–6	13–5	12–6	12–6	11–7	12–6	7–11	11–7	—

=== Notable transactions ===
- April 28, 1967: Bob Lillis was signed as a free agent by the Astros.
- June 6, 1967: John Mayberry was drafted by the Astros in the 1st round (6th pick) of the 1967 Major League Baseball draft.
- June 15, 1967: Claude Raymond was traded by the Astros to the Atlanta Braves for Wade Blasingame.
- July 20, 1967: Gary Kroll was purchased from the Astros by the Cleveland Indians.
- August 7, 1967: Jim Weaver was traded by the Astros to the California Angels for a player to be named later. The Angels completed the deal by sending Héctor Torres to the Astros on November 21.
- August 17, 167: Traded Eddie Mathews to the Detroit Tigers for players to be named later. The Tigers sent right-handed pitcher Fred Gladding on November 22, 1967, and right-handed pitcher Leo Marentette on December 10, 1969, to complete the trade.

=== Roster ===
1967 Houston Astros
Roster
Pitchers: 25,30 Bo Belinsky; 47 Wade Blasingame; 26 John Buzhardt; 44 Danny Coombs; 35 Mike Cuellar; 49 Larry Dierker; 44 Tom Dukes; 44 Arnold Earley; 36 Dave Eilers; 13,31 Turk Farrell; 39 Dave Giusti; 43 Pat House; 48 Barry Latman; 33 Jim Owens; 36 Claude Raymond; 19 Howie Reed; 46 Dan Schneider; 41 Carroll Sembera; 31 Larry Sherry; 31 Bruce Von Hoff; 23,40 Don Wilson; 37 Chris Zachary	Catchers: 4,27 Dave Adlesh; 7 John Bateman; 9 Ron Brand; 8 Bill Heath; 60 Hal King; Infielders: 14 Bob Aspromonte; 42 Lee Bales; 8 Jackie Brandt; 28 Julio Gotay; 17 Chuck Harrison; 16 Sonny Jackson; 15 Bob Lillis; 11 Eddie Mathews; 18 Joe Morgan; 12,19 Doug Rader; 11 Bob Watson	Outfielders: 22 Ron Davis; 20 Jim Landis; 21 Norm Miller; 20 Ivan Murrell; 28 Aaron Pointer; 10 Rusty Staub; 24 Jimmy Wynn; Other batters: 29 Candy Harris; 34 José Herrera	Manager: 1 Grady Hatton; Coaches: 3 Jim Busby (Third base); 2 Nellie Fox (First base); 6 Al Heist; 5 Gordon Jones (Pitching, to July 8); 33 Jim Owens (Pitching, after July 8)

== Game log ==
=== Regular season ===
Legend
	Astros win
	Astros loss
	Postponement
	Eliminated from playoff race
**Bold**	Astros team member

1967 regular season game log: 69–93 (Home: 46–35; Away: 23–58)
April: 5–13 (Home: 4–8; Away: 1–5)

#	Date	Time (CT)	Opponent	Score	Win	Loss	Save	Time of Game	Attendance	Record	Box/ Streak

May: 11–15 (Home: 5–6; Away: 6–9)

#	Date	Time (CT)	Opponent	Score	Win	Loss	Save	Time of Game	Attendance	Record	Box/ Streak

June: 11–19 (Home: 6–10; Away: 5–9)

#	Date	Time (CT)	Opponent	Score	Win	Loss	Save	Time of Game	Attendance	Record	Box/ Streak

July: 19–12 (Home: 14–1; Away: 5–11)

#	Date	Time (CT)	Opponent	Score	Win	Loss	Save	Time of Game	Attendance	Record	Box/ Streak
—	July 11	6:15 p.m. CDT	**38th All-Star Game in Anaheim, CA**								

August: 9–21 (Home: 8–8; Away: 1–13)

#	Date	Time (CT)	Opponent	Score	Win	Loss	Save	Time of Game	Attendance	Record	Box/ Streak

September: 14–12 (Home: 9–2; Away: 5–10)

#	Date	Time (CT)	Opponent	Score	Win	Loss	Save	Time of Game	Attendance	Record	Box/ Streak

October: 0–1 (Home: 0–0; Away: 0–1)

#	Date	Time (CT)	Opponent	Score	Win	Loss	Save	Time of Game	Attendance	Record	Box/ Streak

=== Detailed records ===
National League
Opponent	W	L	WP	RS	RA
**Houston Astros**					
Season Total

Month	Games	Won	Lost	Win %	RS	RA
April
May
June
July
August
September
October
Total

	Games	Won	Lost	Win %	RS	RA
Home
Away
Total

== Player statistics ==
Table legend
League leader (Bold: MLB leader)	Team leader	*	Left-handed batter or pitcher
League top ten	Leader in appearances at position	#	Switch hitter

=== Batting ===
Abbreviations key

- ⌖ — primary position
- G — games played
- PA — plate appearances
- AB — at bats
- R — runs
- H — hits
- 2B — doubles
- HR — home runs
- RBI — runs batted in
- BB — base on balls
- SB — stolen bases
- TB — total bases
- AVG — batting average
- OBP — on-base percentage
- SLG — slugging percentage
- OPS — on-base plus slugging

==== Starters by position ====
Individual batting results
⌖	Player	G	PA	AB	R	H	2B	3B	HR	RBI	SB	BB	SO	TB	AVG	OBP	SLG	OPS
C	John Bateman	76	273	252	16	48	9	0	2	17	0	17	53	63	.190	.245	.250	.495
1B	Eddie Mathews*	101	383	328	39	78	13	2	10	38	2	48	65	125	.238	.333	.378	.714
2B	Joe Morgan*	133	580	494	73	136	27	11	6	42	29	81	51	203	.275	.378	.411	.789
3B	Bob Aspromonte	137	540	486	51	143	24	5	6	58	2	45	44	195	.294	.354	.401	.755
SS	Sonny Jackson*	129	566	520	31	123	18	3	0	25	22	36	45	147	.237	.285	.283	.568
LF	Ron Davis	94	307	285	31	73	19	1	7	38	5	17	48	115	.256	.303	.404	.706
CF	Jim Wynn	158	683	594	102	148	29	3	37	107	16	74	137	294	.249	.331	.495	.826
RF	Rusty Staub*	149	621	546	71	182	**44**	1	10	74	0	60	47	258	.333	.398	.473	.871

==== Other batters ====
Individual batting results
Player	G	AB	R	AVG	HR	RBI
Julio Gotay	77	234	66	.282	2	15
Ron Brand	84	215	52	.242	0	18
Norm Miller*	64	190	39	.205	1	14
Chuck Harrison	70	177	43	.243	2	26
Doug Rader	47	162	54	.333	2	26
Jim Landis	50	143	36	.252	1	14
Dave Adlesh	39	94	17	.181	1	4
Jackie Brandt	41	89	21	.236	1	15
Bob Lillis	37	82	20	.244	0	5
Aaron Pointer	27	70	11	.157	1	10
Hal King*	15	44	11	.250	0	6
Ivan Murrell	10	29	9	.310	0	1
Lee Bales^{#}	19	27	3	.111	0	2
Bob Watson	6	14	3	.214	1	2
Bill Heath	9	11	1	.091	0	0
José Herrera	5	4	1	.250	0	1
Candy Harris^{#}	6	1	0	.000	0	0

=== Pitching ===
Abbreviations key

- W — wins
- L — losses
- ERA — earned run average
- G — games pitched
- GS — games started
- CG — complete games
- ShO — shutouts
- SV — saves
- IP — innings pitched
- SO — strikeouts

==== Starting pitchers ====
Individual pitching results
Player	W	L	ERA	G	GS	CG	ShO	IP	SO
Mike Cuellar*	16	11	3.03	36	32	16	3	246.1	203
Dave Giusti	11	15	4.18	37	33	8	1	221.2	157
Don Wilson	10	9	2.79	31	28	7	3	184.0	159
Bo Belinsky*	3	9	4.68	27	18	0	0	115.1	80
Larry Dierker	6	5	3.36	15	15	4	0	99.0	68
Wade Blasingame	4	7	5.96	15	14	1	0	77.0	46
Bruce Von Hoff	0	3	4.83	10	10	0	0	50.1	22
Chris Zachary	1	6	5.70	9	7	0	0	36.1	18

==== Other pitchers ====
Individual pitching results
Player	G	IP	W	L	ERA	SO
Danny Coombs	6	24.1	3	0	3.33	23
Howie Reed	4	18.1	1	1	3.44	9

==== Relief pitchers ====
Individual pitching results
Player	G	W	L	SV	ERA	SO
Larry Sherry	29	1	2	6	4.87	32
Dan Schneider	54	0	2	2	4.96	39
Carroll Sembera	45	2	6	3	4.83	48
Barry Latman	39	3	6	0	4.52	70
Dave Eilers	35	6	4	1	3.94	27
Claude Raymond	21	0	4	5	3.19	17
Tom Dukes	17	0	2	2	5.32	23
Jim Owens	10	0	1	0	4.22	6
Turk Farrell	7	1	0	0	4.63	10
Pat House	6	1	0	1	4.50	2
Arnold Earley	2	0	0	0	27.00	1
John Buzhardt	1	0	0	0	0.00	0

== Major League Baseball draft ==
Houston Astros 1967 MLB draft selections
Rd.	Slot	Draftee	Position	School	Origin	Signed	Notes	Bio
1	6	John Mayberry	First baseman	Northwestern High	(Michigan)	Y	(Note: MLB debut on September 10, 1968, for Houston)	
2	26	Jay Schlueter	Outfielder	Central High	(Arizona)	Y	(Note: MLB debut on June 18, 1971, for Houston)	
3	46	Craig Hilden	Left-handed pitcher	Bellarmine Prep	(Washington (state))	Y		

== Awards and achievements ==
=== Career achievements ===
- 500 home runs: Eddie Mathews—July 14, 1967

=== No-hit game ===
Date	Pitcher	IP	BB	BR	K	BF	Catcher	Final	Opponent	Venue	Plate umpire	Box
June 18, 1967	Don Wilson	9	3	3	15	30	Dave Adlesh	2–0	Atlanta Braves	Astrodome	Billy Williams	
June 18, 1967	Wilson: Game score: 99 • Win (4–3)											

=== Awards ===
1967 Houston Astros award winners
Name of award		Recipient	Ref.
Houston Astros Most Valuable Player (MVP)		Rusty Staub	
MLB All-Star Game	Reserve outfielder	Jimmy Wynn	
MLB All-Star Game	Reserve outfielder	Rusty Staub	
MLB All-Star Game	Reserve pitcher	Mike Cuellar	
The Sporting News NL All-Star	Outfielder	Jimmy Wynn	

Other awards results

Name of award	Voting recipient(s) (Team)	Ref.
NL Most Valuable Player	1st—Cepeda (STL) • 11th—Wynn (HOU); Other Astros: 16th—Staub	

=== League leaders ===
NL batting leaders

- Bases on balls: Joe Morgan (81, 2nd)
  - Jimmy Wynn (74, 6th)
- Batting average: Rusty Staub (.333, 5th)
- Doubles: Rusty Staub (44—led MLB)
  - Jimmy Wynn (29, 10th)
- Hits: : Rusty Staub (182, 8th)
- Home runs: Jimmy Wynn (37, 2nd)
- On-base percentage (OBP); Rusty Staub (.398, 4th)
  - Joe Morgan (.378, 8th)
- Runs batted in (RBI): Jimmy Wynn (107, 4th)
- Slugging percentage (SLG): Jimmy Wynn (.495, 8th)
- Stolen bases: Joe Morgan (29, 2nd)
  - Sonny Jackson (22, 7th)
- Strikeouts: Jimmy Wynn (137, 1st)
- Total bases: Jimmy Wynn (294, 8th)
- Triples: Joe Morgan (11, 4th)

=== Other ===
1967 grand slams
No.	Date	Astros batter	Venue	Inning	Pitcher	Opposing team	Box
None (Note: Houston's first season since 1965 without a grand slam.)

== Minor league system ==
Level	Team	League	Manager
AAA	Oklahoma City 89ers	Pacific Coast League	Mel McGaha
AA	Amarillo Sonics	Texas League	Buddy Hancken
A	Asheville Tourists	Carolina League	Chuck Churn
A	Cocoa Astros	Florida State League	Walt Matthews
Rookie	Covington Astros	Appalachian League	Tony Pacheco

Awards

- Pacific Coast League Pitcher of the Year: Howie Reed, RHP
- Texas League Most Valuable Player Award (MVP): Nate Colbert, 1B

== See also ==
- 500 home run club
- List of Major League Baseball annual doubles leaders
- List of Major League Baseball annual fielding errors leaders
- List of Major League Baseball no-hitters
