= 1966 Houston Astros season =

Fifth season in Major League Baseball for the Houston Astros

1966 Houston Astros
- League: National League
- Ballpark: Astrodome
- City: Houston, Texas
- Record: 72–90 (.444)
- League place: 8th
- Owners: Roy Hofheinz
- General managers: Tal Smith
- Managers: Grady Hatton
- Television: KTRK-TV
- Radio: KPRC (AM) (Gene Elston, Loel Passe, Harry Kalas)

The 1966 Houston Astros season was the fifth season for the Major League Baseball (MLB) franchise located in Houston, Texas, their second as the Astros, fifth in the National League (NL), and second at The Astrodome. The Astros entered the season with a 65–97 record, in ninth place and 32 games behind the NL pennant and World Series-winning Los Angeles Dodgers.

The 1965 season was the first for Grady Hatton as manager, the third in franchise history, having replaced Lum Harris. On April 12 at Dodger Stadium, Robin Roberts made the Opening Day start for Houston, who were defeated by Los Angeles, 3–2.

Though this was the second season for the Astrodome in operation, it was the first with the playing surface of AstroTurf installed. The infield portion was installed in March, and the outfield was ready for play on July 19. The Astros' first-round draft pick in the amateur draft was pitcher Wayne Twitchell, at third overall.

Second baseman Joe Morgan and pitcher Claude Raymond represented the Astros at the MLB All-Star Game, the first career selection for both. Morgan was the first player in franchise history to be named starter to the mid-season event; however, he missed the game due to injury.

The Astros concluded the season with a record of 72–90 (.444), in eighth place and 23 games behind the Dodgers, who repeated as NL pennant-winners. At the time, the 72 wins represented more than Houston had won in any of their first four seasons of play.

== Offseason ==
=== Summary ===
The Houston Astros concluded the 1965 campaign with a 65–97 (.401) record, ranking ninth in the National League (NL), 32 games behind the NL pennant and World Series-winning Los Angeles Dodgers. The 97 defeats represented a club record, one more than the 96 losses during each of the team's first three years of play. (Note: The Astros tied the team record for losses in 1975 and 1991.) This remained the club record until 2011. On April 12, 1965, the Astros hosted the Philadelphia Phillies for the first regular-season game at the Astrodome, but were shut out, 2–0. On July 8, rookie second baseman Joe Morgan became the first player in team history to collect six hits in a single game.

=== Transactions ===
- November 29, 1965: 1965 rule 5 draft
  - Nate Colbert was drafted by the Astros from the St. Louis Cardinals.
  - Bob Saverine was drafted from the Astros by the Washington Senators.
- January 6, 1966: Johnny Weekly and cash were traded by the Astros to the New York Mets for Gary Kroll.

== Regular season ==
=== Summary ===
==== April—May ====
Opening Day starting lineup
Uniform	Player	Position
20	Lee Maye	Left fielder
16	Sonny Jackson	Shortstop
24	Jimmy Wynn	Center fielder
21	Dave Nicholson	Right fielder
18	Joe Morgan	Second baseman
14	Bob Aspromonte	Third baseman
17	Chuck Harrison	First baseman
7	John Bateman	Catcher
38	Robin Roberts	Pitcher
Venue: Dodger Stadium • Los Angeles 3, Houston 2 Sources:

At Dodger Stadium for Opening Day, the Astros dropped a 3–2 decision to Los Angeles. Lee Maye hit a sacrifice fly in the top of the third off Claude Osteen, and Chuck Harrison added a run batted in (RBI)-single in top of the ninth; however, Osteen went the distance to secure the victory. Ron Fairly factored in all three runs for Los Angeles, slashing a pair of RBI singles and a sacrifice fly. Houston starter Robin Roberts surrendered two runs—one earned—over seven innings to take the loss.

Courtesy of Jimmy Wynn's single on May 5, Joe Morgan scored the walk-off run to allow the Astros to obtain their 13th win in 13 innings. Hence, the Astros prevailed, 4–3, over the Chicacgo Cubs. Though both game's starting pitchers, Turk Farrell and Bill Faul, bore uniform number 13, neither stayed in long enough to receive a decision for the win. It was Frank Carpin (1–0) who recorded the victory, when in the top of the 13th, with two outs Adolfo Phillips and Glenn Beckert pulled a double steal of second and third. Phillips next attempted to steal home, but the pitch arrived to the plate prior to him and catcher Bill Heath applied the tag to record the final out of the inning. Hence, Carpin became the second National League hurler to record a victory without a throwing a single pitch to the batter, accomplishing the feat twenty years to the day since Preacher Roe of the Pittsburgh Pirates on May 5, 1946.

==== June ====
On June 2, the Astros recorded the first-ever 20-hit game in franchise history, (Note: The Astros next 20-hit game occurred on June 7, 1967, during which the Astros defeated the St. Louis Cardinals, 17–1. Criteria: For single games, from 1898 to 2026, for HOU, in the regular season, requiring hits ≥ 20, sorted by ascending date.) as Houston entered the 12th inning tied 3–3 with the Cincinnati Reds, and rallied to forge nine hits to defeat the Reds, 11–4. Rusty Staub collected two hits in the inning, starting with a single and finished off with a double. Joe Morgan coaxed five base on balls to score a run, Sonny Jackson collected four hits while scoring twice, and Dave Nicholson collected four RBI. This was the third four-RBI bout of Nicholson/s career, Morgan's only five-walk game, and Jackson's first-career four-hit game.

Pitcher Dave Giusti turned in an all-around contribution for the Astros on June 12, tossing a complete game over the Cubs to lead an 8–4 win. At the plate, he doubled and went 3-for-3. John Bateman, Rusty Staub and Dave Nicholson all homered for Houston. It was Giusti's second three-hit game at the plate on the season.

With the Astros hosting the Los Angeles Dodgers on June 22, a record-setting 55.988 fans witnessed Sandy Koufax take on the Houston Astros. Though Koufax led the Dodgers to a 5–2 win, Astros outfielder Jimmy Wynn provided the audience with some thrills as he went 4-for-4 with a home run and two doubles. This attendance record stood for 22 years.

==== Mike Cuellar's 15-strikeout game ====
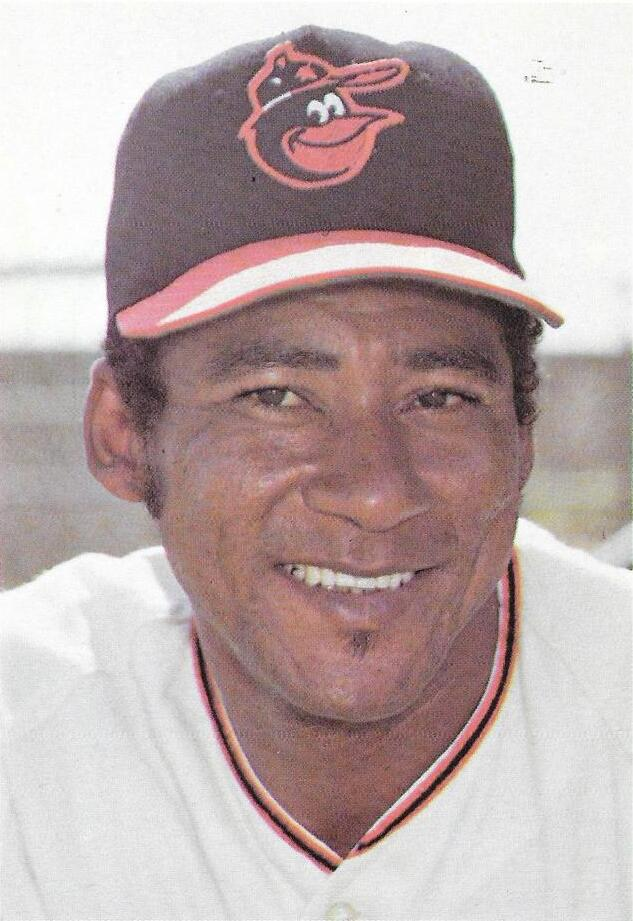
Mike Cuellar, c. 1972, with Baltimore, established single-season club records for earned run average (ERA) and, in 1967, strikeouts (tied). (Note: For single seasons, playing for HOU, in the regular season, requiring strikeouts ≥ 200, sorted by ascending season.)

During pregame batting practice drills on June 25 before playing the St. Louis Cardinals, Lee Maye's line drive struck Astros infielder Joe Morgan on the knee, fracturing it. He would miss the next 40 games including his first All-Star Game. Batting .319 prior to the injury, Morgan became the first player in franchise history to be named starter at the All-Star Game on June 28. During Morgan's absence, the Astros performed to a record of 11–29 (.275).

However, the Astros' on-field performance—including that of starter Mike Cuellar—temporarily averted the impact of losing of their star second baseman. Cuellar became the first Astros pitcher to register 15 strikeouts in an outing. Cuellar started his outing off with a whiff of Lou Brock. Phil Gagliano drew a base on balls, but Cuellar picked him off first, and retired the Redbirds in order in the first.

Sonny Jackson hit a leadoff inside-the-park home run for Houston, his second inside-the-parker in five days. In the bottom of the fourth, Rusty Staub scored when Bob Aspromonte's grounder was misplayed for a 2–0 Astros' lead.

In the top of the second, Cuellar fanned Orlando Cepeda and Mike Shannon. The following inning, he whiffed Ray Washburn and Brock again. In the third, Cuellar K'd Curt Flood. In the fifth, Cuellar got Dal Maxvill and Pat Corrales via the punchout.

In the top of the sixth, Flood singled home Gagliano for St. Louis' first run. However, each out was obtained by Cuellar striking out the side. In the seventh, Cuellar again struck out the side, this time retiring all three batters in order. Cuellar's final strikeout was of Tim McCarver looking to the polish off the contest.

Morgan's replacement, Bob Lillis scored an insurance run on Jackson's misplayed grounder to second base. The Cardinals added another run, but Cuellar escaped any further Cardinals tallies.

The pivotal defensive play of the contest transpired with out in the top of the eighth. Mike Shannon flied out into a double play to center fielder Dave Nicholson, who rifled an assist to nab Julián Javier at home plate. Jimmy Wynn also recorded an outfield assist, of Lou Brock at third base. The Astros record stood at 38–32 (.543).

A career-high in strikeouts for Cuellar, his outing broke the club record of 13 strikeouts, achieved twice, by Turk Farrell on May 10, 1963, and by Bob Bruce, on May 26, 1965. This remained the franchise record until Don Wilson tallied 18 punchouts on July 14, 1968. Cuellar retained the club record for left-handers until Randy Johnson struck out 16 on August 28, 1998.

==== July ====
In the sweltering 104 °F (40 °C) Great Plains on July 10, Cuellar shut down the Cardinals' bases-loaded rally with none out in the eighth, then finished off the contest by inducing a double play ground ball from Jimy Williams to preserve Houston's 6–5 victory. Rusty Staub homered twice and drove home four. Though Orlando Cepeda and Dal Maxvill had four hits apiece to spearhead St. Louis' 16 hits total, the team stranded 15 runners on base.

Houston concluded the first half of the 1966 season with a 45–40 (.529) record, occupying fifth place of 10 National League clubs, and 8 games behind the league-leading San Francisco Giants. Hence, the Astros entered the All-Star break with a winning record for the first time in club history, after having absorbed 96 or more losses in each of their first four seasons.

Continuing in St. Louis, on July 12, Joe Morgan and Claude Raymond were invited to the MLB All-Star Game, hosted at Busch Memorial Stadium for the first time. Each of the National League's moundsmen who participated (Koufax, Bunning, Marichal, Perry) went to the Baseball Hall of Fame among 19 future Hall of Famers. Neither Astros player participated. The National League won, 3–1.

==== August ====
Jim Wynn's season ended abruptly on August 1 when he collided into the outfield wall at Connie Mack Stadium in the bottom of the tenth inning, fracturing his left arm. Wynn was chasing a fly ball that Dick Allen had hit; instead, it resulted in a game-winning, inside-the-park home run for Allen and the Philadelphia Phillies.

On August 11, outfielder Lee Maye achieved his first five-hit game as a member of the Astros, during the first contest of a doubleheader. Bob Aspromonte walloped a grand slam, during the second inning off former teammate Robin Roberts. Chuck Harrison doubled and tripled. However, Randy Hundley hit for the cycle with three runs batted in for the Chicago Cubs to lead a defeat of Houston, 9–8.

Dave Giusti spun a career-best one-hit, no-walk shutout masterpiece on August 13, whiffed four, and earned a game score of 89. Giusti (12–9) outdueled Juan Marichal (17–5) to lead a 3–0 triumph over the Giants. The lone blemish on Giusti's effort was a Cap Peterson single in the second inning. During the top of the fourth, Bob Aspromonte singled in Joe Morgan to open the scoring. Ron Davis hit his first home run, and Lee Maye added an RBI single. Meanwhile, Sonny Jackson filched his 37th base to establish a new National League report.

Sonny Jackson golfed his third inside-the-park home run of the season on August 19 versus Cincinnati, establishing a club record. The speedster Jackson became the first Astro to hit three inside-the-park demolitions in one season. He also amassed his fourth four-hit contest of the season, Jackson and Rusty Staub each had two RBI, and Staub drove Jackson in for the walk-off victory. Starter Larry Dierker tossed his first career double-digit strikeout performance with 11.

On August 21, Giusti tallied career-highs of both six RBI and two doubles at the plate, while, on the mound (13–10), fired his second shutout in under 10 days to lead an 11–0 drubbing of Cincinnati. Meanwhile, Aspromonte tripled, and a trio of Astros position players each secured doubles (Dave Nicholson, Chuck Harrison, and Joe Morgan).

On August 26, Bob Aspromonte hit the second walk-off grand slam in franchise history, after having hit the first on June 11, 1963. (Note: The third walk-off grand slam for the Astros was hit by Doug Rader on May 27, 1969, also against Philadelphia.) Aspromonte's blast exacerbated the misery of an infuriated Cubs manager Leo Durocher, who had earlier ripped out the dugout phone from off the wall and heaved it onto the Astrodome field. The Cubs took a 4–1 lead over the Astros into bottom of the ninth. The Astros rallied for six runs, capped by Aspromonte's grand slam off Cal Koonce, vaulting Houston to a dramatic 7–4 triumph. Earlier in the inning, John Bateman (16) had also homered. Turk Farrell (6–8) earned the victory by settling two final, perfect innings. Aspromonte's sixth career grand slam—all with Houston—it was the first-ever walloped at the Astrodome. His third career walk-off home run overall, this was Aspromonte's second via the grand slam, and all three blasts had come at the expense of the Cubs. Southwestern Bell restored the dugout apparatus the following day and the Astros apportioned Durocher the bill.

Mike Cuellar spun his first major league shutout on August 29, silencing the Pittsburgh Pirates by a verdict of 2–0, while authoring a brilliant five-hit, 12-strikeout performance. Center fielder Ron Davis tripled in Dave Nicholson and Bob Lillis off Pirates starter Bob Veale during the top of the fifth to account for all of the tallies. Cuellar earned a game score of 88.

Aspromonte established a club record with 28 RBI over a calendar month in August, surpassing 21 attained by former teammates Román Mejías (May 1962) and Walt Bond (June 1964). On the month, Aspromonte bit .259 with two triples and seven home runs. (Note: Later surpassed by Jimmy Wynn in June, 1967. Criteria: In the regular season, from 1898 to 2026, playing for HOU, for any choice in months, requiring runs batted in ≥ 28, sorted by greatest runs batted in.)

==== September ====
On September 5 and 6, John Bateman became the second player in team history to record four hits each over consecutive games, succeeding Al Spangler on May 22 and 24, 1963. (Note: Next accomplished for Houston by Wilbur Howard on August 23 and 24, 1975. Criteria: Longest streak of consecutive games, playing for HOU, in the regular season, requiring Hits ≥ 4, sorted by most games matching criteria.)

Bob Watson landed his major league debut on September 9 as a pinch hitter against Los Angeles, his one and only plate appearance in the majors that season.

On September 16, Chuck Harrison hit his first Major League grand slam, Sonny Jackson assembled a career-best five-hit game, while Ron Davis collected a double among four hits as Houston triumphed over Philadelphia, 6–4. Harrison launched his blast in toe of the fourth inning off Chris Short to give Houston a 4–3 lead. He also doubled. Cuellar (11–9) reaped a complete game victory. It was Jackson's fifth bout of the season of four safeties or more.

Mike Cuellar slugged his first career home run on September 28, helping himself to become the winning pitcher (12–10) in a 3–2 decision over Cincinnati.

Twenty-one year old right-hander Don Wilson made his major-league debut on September 29 at Crosley Field, during which he attained key milestones on the mound and in the batter's box, including his first major league win and first hit. Wilson assumed the third inning in relief of Bob Bruce, and the first batter, Leo Cárdenas, singled. However, Càrdenas was immediately retired on a double play, when Wilson handled Joe Nuxhall's bunt attempt, and flipped it to shortstop Sonny Jackson for the twin-killing. Wilson fanned Art Shamsky in the bottom of the fourth for his first major league strikeout, but later surrendered his first home run to Shamsky in the bottom of the seventh inning, a two-run blast. By then, Houston already had mounted a 3–0 lead courtesy of home runs by Chuck Harrison and Aaron Pointer. Immediately following Pointer's home run in the top of the seventh, Wilson doubled off Nuxhall for his first major league hit. He totaled six innings on the mound with seven strikeouts. In the bottom of the ninth, Turk Farrell retired the Reds in order, closing out a 3–2 Houston victory for his second save of the season and to preserve the win for Wilson. This was Houston's 70th win of the season, the first time they had reached that threshold, during their fifth season of play.

On September 30, twenty-year-old Larry Dierker took a perfect game into the ninth inning versus the New York Mets, while navigating a scoreless tie. Eddie Bressoud led off the bottom of the ninth for the Mets with a double to left field, ending both the perfect game and no-hit bid. While facing the next hitter, Ron Hunt, Dierker threw a wild pitch, allowing Bressoud to advance to third base. Hunt then singled to right field to score Bressoud and earn New York a walk-off victory. Mets starter Jack Fisher (11–14) also stayed through the entire game, garnering the shutout and victory. Dierker (10–8) received an eight-inning complete game defeat and game score of 80. Per the Elias Sports Bureau, through 2024, this bout remains the longest bid for a perfect game in Astros franchise history.

==== Performance overview ====
The Astros concluded the season with a 72–90–1 (.445) record, in eighth place and 23 games behind the Dodgers in the National League, who repeated as the NL pennant-winners. Though the Astros finished with a 45–40 (.529) record in the first half, they stumbled to a 27–50–1 (.353) showing over the season's final half. Still, the 72 victories represented an improvement by seven from the year prior, also establishing a then-team record, during their fifth season of play. The Astros matched this threshold again in 1968, prior to surpassing that landmark in 1969 with their first-ever .500 record and 81 wins.

The Astros hammered 112 home runs, just the second instance in club history to reach the century mark (105 during the inaugural campaign of 1962). This stood as the club record until the 1970 iteration left the park 129 times.

Left-hander Mike Cuellar set single-season club records for earned run average (ERA, 2.22). In 1981, Nolan Ryan (1.69) and Bob Knepper (2.18) surpassed Cueller for ERA; Knepper also overtook the franchise record for left-handers. (Note: For single seasons, throws LH, qualified for league ERA title, playing for HOU, in the regular season, sorted by ascending earned run average.)

Having increased his grand slam total on August 26, Bob Aspromonte's six grand slams established Houston's franchise record, which stood until surpassed by Carlos Lee on July 25, 2011.

With 49 stolen bases, Sonny Jackson tied the Major League rookie record established by Rollie Zeider of the Chicago White Sox in 1910. (Note: Jackson and Zeider were outpaced by Gene Richards (56) of the San Diego Diego Padres in 1977.) Further, Jackson claimed the franchise record from Jim Wynn, who had pilfered 43 just the season prior. In 1969, Joe Morgan tied the record. Three years later, in 1972, César Cedeño procured 55 to usurp the club record. (Note: For single seasons, playing for HOU, in the regular season, requiring stolen bases ≥ 40, sorted by ascending season.)

=== League standings ===
National League
Team	W	L	Pct.	GB	Home	Road
Los Angeles Dodgers	95	67	.586	—	53‍–‍28	42‍–‍39
San Francisco Giants	93	68	.578	1½	47‍–‍34	46‍–‍34
Pittsburgh Pirates	92	70	.568	3	46‍–‍35	46‍–‍35
Philadelphia Phillies	87	75	.537	8	48‍–‍33	39‍–‍42
Atlanta Braves	85	77	.525	10	43‍–‍38	42‍–‍39
St. Louis Cardinals	83	79	.512	12	43‍–‍38	40‍–‍41
Cincinnati Reds	76	84	.475	18	46‍–‍33	30‍–‍51
Houston Astros	72	90	.444	23	45‍–‍36	27‍–‍54
New York Mets	66	95	.410	28½	32‍–‍49	34‍–‍46
Chicago Cubs	59	103	.364	36	32‍–‍49	27‍–‍54

=== Record versus opponents ===
National League

1966 National League record Sources:
Team	ATL	CHC	CIN	HOU	LAD	NYM	PHI	PIT	SF	STL
Atlanta	—	7–11	10–8	14–4–1	7–11	14–4	11–7	7–11	8–10	7–11
Chicago	11–7	—	6–12	5–13	8–10	8–10	5–13	6–12	6–12	4–14
Cincinnati	8–10	12–6	—	4–14	6–12	10–7	10–8	8–10	7–10	11–7
Houston	4–14–1	13–5	14–4	—	7–11	7–11	7–11	4–14	6–12	10–8
Los Angeles	11–7	10–8	12–6	11–7	—	12–6	11–7	9–9	9–9	10–8
New York	4–14	10–8	7–10	11–7	6–12	—	7–11	5–13	9–9	7–11
Philadelphia	7–11	13–5	8–10	11–7	7–11	11–7	—	10–8	10–8	10–8
Pittsburgh	11–7	12–6	10–8	14–4	9–9	13–5	8–10	—	7–11	8–10
San Francisco	10–8	12–6	10–7	12–6	9–9	9–9	8–10	11–7	—	12–6
St. Louis	11–7	14–4	7–11	8–10	8–10	11–7	8–10	10–8	6–12	—

=== Roster ===
1966 Houston Astros
Roster
Pitchers: 46 Don Arlich; 30 Bob Bruce; 42 Frank Carpin; 44 Danny Coombs; 35 Mike Cuellar; 49 Larry Dierker; 13 Turk Farrell; 39 Dave Giusti; 31 Gary Kroll; 48 Barry Latman; 48 Don Lee; 37 Aurelio Monteagudo; 33 Jim Owens; 38 Jim Ray; 36 Claude Raymond; 38 Robin Roberts; 41 Carroll Sembera; 40 Ron Taylor; 23 Don Wilson; 37 Chris Zachary	Catchers: 27 Dave Adlesh; 7 John Bateman; 9 Ron Brand; 8 Bill Heath; Infielders: 14 Bob Aspromonte; 11 Gene Freese; 4 Jim Gentile; 11 Julio Gotay; 17 Chuck Harrison; 16 Sonny Jackson; 15 Bob Lillis; 25 Félix Mantilla; 18 Joe Morgan	Outfielders: 29 Brock Davis; 22 Ron Davis; 46 Joe Gaines; 20 Lee Maye; 34 Norm Miller; 21 Dave Nicholson; 28 Aaron Pointer; 22 Greg Sims; 10 Rusty Staub; 24 Jimmy Wynn; Other batters: 12 Nate Colbert; 38 Bob Watson	Manager: 1 Grady Hatton; Coaches: 5 Jim Busby (Third Base); 2 Nellie Fox; 6 Al Heist; 3 Gordon Jones; 38 Robin Roberts

== Player stats ==
=== Batting ===
==== Starters by position ====
Note: Pos = Position; G = Games played; AB = At bats; H = Hits; Avg. = Batting average; HR = Home runs; RBI = Runs batted in

Pos	Player	G	AB	H	Avg.	HR	RBI
C	John Bateman	131	433	121	.279	17	70
1B	Chuck Harrison	119	434	111	.256	9	52
2B	Joe Morgan	122	425	121	.285	5	42
3B	Bob Aspromonte	152	560	141	.252	8	52
SS	Sonny Jackson	150	596	174	.292	3	25
LF	Lee Maye	115	358	103	.288	9	36
CF	Jimmy Wynn	105	418	107	.256	18	62
RF	Rusty Staub	153	554	155	.280	13	81

==== Other batters ====
Note: G = Games played; AB = At bats; H = Hits; Avg. = Batting average; HR = Home runs; RBI = Runs batted in

Player	G	AB	H	Avg.	HR	RBI
Dave Nicholson	100	280	69	.246	10	31
Ron Davis	48	194	48	.247	2	19
Bob Lillis	68	164	38	.232	0	11
Félix Mantilla	77	151	33	.219	6	22
Jim Gentile	49	144	35	.243	7	18
Ron Brand	56	123	30	.244	0	10
Bill Heath	55	123	37	.301	0	8
Norm Miller	11	34	5	.147	1	3
Gene Freese	21	33	3	.091	0	0
Brock Davis	10	27	4	.148	0	1
Aaron Pointer	11	26	9	.346	1	5
Joe Gaines	11	13	1	.077	0	0
Nate Colbert	19	7	0	.000	0	0
Dave Adlesh	3	6	0	.000	0	0
Greg Sims	7	6	1	.167	0	0
Julio Gotay	4	5	0	.000	0	0
Bob Watson	1	1	0	.000	0	0

=== Pitching ===
==== Starting pitchers ====
Note: G = Games pitched; IP = Innings pitched; W = Wins; L = Losses; ERA = Earned run average; SO = Strikeouts

Player	G	IP	W	L	ERA	SO
Mike Cuellar	38	227.1	12	10	2.22	175
Dave Giusti	34	210.0	15	14	4.20	131
Larry Dierker	29	187.0	10	8	3.18	108
Bob Bruce	25	129.2	3	13	5.34	71
Robin Roberts	13	63.2	3	5	3.82	26
Chris Zachary	10	55.0	3	5	3.44	37

==== Other pitchers ====
Note: G = Games pitched; IP = Innings pitched; W = Wins; L = Losses; ERA = Earned run average; SO = Strikeouts

Player	G	IP	W	L	ERA	SO
Turk Farrell	32	152.2	6	10	4.60	101
Barry Latman	31	103.0	2	7	2.71	74

==== Relief pitchers ====
Note: G = Games pitched; W = Wins; L = Losses; SV = Saves; ERA = Earned run average; SO = Strikeouts

Player	G	W	L	SV	ERA	SO
Claude Raymond	62	7	5	16	3.13	73
Jim Owens	40	4	7	2	4.68	32
Ron Taylor	36	2	3	0	5.71	29
Carroll Sembera	24	1	2	1	3.00	21
Gary Kroll	10	0	0	0	3.80	22
Aurelio Monteagudo	10	0	0	1	4.70	7
Frank Carpin	10	1	0	0	7.50	2
Don Lee	9	2	0	0	2.50	9
Don Arlich	7	0	1	0	15.75	1
Danny Coombs	2	0	0	0	3.38	3
Don Wilson	1	1	0	0	3.00	7
Jim Ray	1	0	0	0	inf	0

== Major League Baseball draft ==
Houston Astros 1966 MLB draft selections
Rd.	Slot	Draftee	Position	School	Origin	Signed	Notes	Bio
1	3	Wayne Twitchell	Right-handed pitcher	Ida B. Wells-Barnett High	(Oregon)	Y	(Note: MLB debut on September 7, 1970, with the Milwaukee Brewers)	
2	23	Ron Crook	Left-handed pitcher	Georgia Tech	(Georgia (U.S. state))	Y		
3	43	John D'Auria	Right-handed pitcher	Arcadia High	(California)	N	(Note: Signed with the Detroit Tigers from the January secondary phase in the 1967 draft.)	
4	63	Elliott Maddox	Infielder	Union HS	(New Jersey)	N	(Note: Signed with the Detroit Tigers from the June secondary phase in the 1967 draft.) (Note: MLB debut on April 7, 1970, with Detroit)	
8	143	Fred Stanley	Infielder	Monte Vista HS (CA)	(Iowa)	Y	(Note: MLB debut on September 11, 1969, with the Seattle Pilots)	

== Awards and achievements ==
=== Grand slams ===
No.	Date	Astros batter	Venue	Inning	Pitcher	Opposing team	Box
1	August 11 (Note: Game 1 of doubleheader)	Bob Aspromonte	Wrigley Field	2 (Note: Tied score or took lead)	Robin Roberts	Chicago Cubs	
2	August 26	Bob Aspromonte	Astrodome	9 (Note: Walk-off)	Cal Koonce	Chicago Cubs	
3	September 16	Chuck Harrison (Note: 1st MLB grand slam)	Connie Mack Stadium	4	Chris Short	Philadelphia Phillies	

=== Pitching achievements ===
Perfect game bid
Date	Starting pitcher (IP)	Relief pitcher(s) (IP)	PG IP	GS	Catcher	Batter	Final	Opponent	Box
September 30, 1966	Larry Dierker (8)	—	8 (Note: Perfect game and no-hit bids simultaneously ended on same play.)	80	Bill Heath	Eddie Bressoud (Note: First batter of ninth inning.)	0–1	New York Mets	
Note: Includes those games started with 7 or more perfect innings.

=== Awards ===
1966 Houston Astros award winners
Name of award		Recipient	Ref.
Houston Astros Most Valuable Player (MVP)		Rusty Staub	
MLB All-Star Game	Starting second baseman	Joe Morgan	
MLB All-Star Game	Reserve pitcher	Claude Raymond	
Topps All-Star Rookie Team	Shortstop	Sonny Jackson	

Other awards results

Name of award	Voting recipient(s) (Team)	Ref.
NL Most Valuable Player	1st—Clemente (PIT) • 22nd—Staub (HOU)	
NL Rookie of the Year	1st—Helms (CIN) • 2nd—Jackson (HOU)	

== Minor league system ==
Level	Team	League	Manager
AAA	Oklahoma City 89ers	Pacific Coast League	Mel McGaha
AA	Amarillo Sonics	Texas League	Buddy Hancken
A	Durham Bulls	Carolina League	Chuck Churn
A	Cocoa Astros	Florida State League	Joe Frazier
A	Salisbury Astros	Western Carolinas League	Walt Matthews
A-Short Season	Bismarck–Mandan Pards	Northern League	Tony Pacheco

== See also ==
- List of Major League Baseball annual fielding errors leaders
