= Dooley Womack =

American baseball player (born 1939)

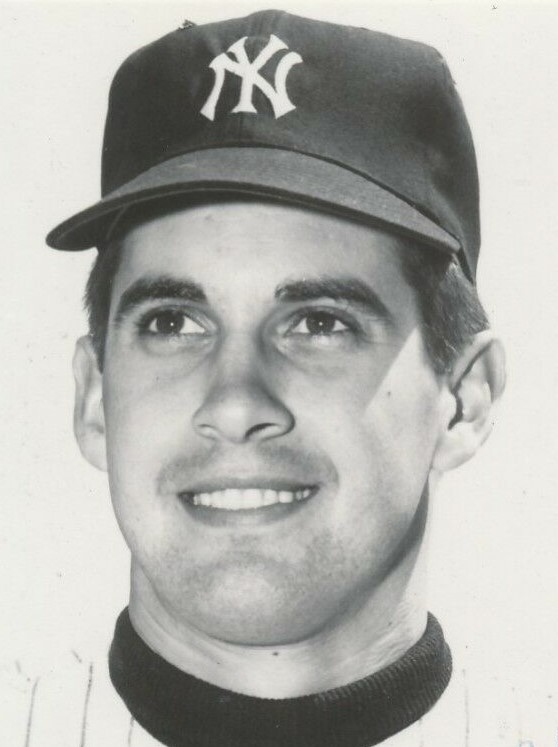
- Pitcher
- Born: August 25, 1939 (age 87); Columbia, South Carolina, U.S.
- Batted: Left Threw: Right

MLB debut
- April 14, 1966, for the New York Yankees

Last MLB appearance
- September 27, 1970, for the Oakland Athletics

MLB statistics
- Win–loss record: 19–18
- Earned run average: 2.95
- Strikeouts: 177
- Saves: 24
- Stats at Baseball Reference

Teams
- New York Yankees (1966–1968); Houston Astros (1969); Seattle Pilots (1969); Oakland Athletics (1970)

Horace Guy "Dooley" Womack (born August 25, 1939) is an American former professional baseball pitcher. A right-hander, he played all or part of five seasons in Major League Baseball from 1966 to 1970 for the New York Yankees, Houston Astros, Seattle Pilots, and Oakland Athletics, almost exclusively as a relief pitcher. He also played in the Cincinnati Reds minor league system for one season.

Listed at 6 ft 0 in (1.83 m) tall and weighing 170 pounds, Womack was never a highly touted prospect, due in part to his unimposing size and fastball. "I admit", he once said, "I won't overpower anybody..." Despite the lack of fanfare surrounding him, Womack "went from a non-prospect to a must-use" at the beginning of his major league career, according to Harvey Frommer in his book, A Yankee Century.

Womack began his professional career as a starting pitcher in 1958 at the age of 18 and played for 14 seasons, ending his career as a relief pitcher at the age of 31 in 1971. He spent ten seasons in the minor leagues and five in the major leagues, spending one year at the D-level, one year at the C-level, one full year and part of another at the B-level, one full year and part of another at the Single-A level, two full years at the Double-A level, two full years at the Triple-A level and most of a third year at the Triple-A level.

At the major league level, Womack went 19–18 with a 2.95 ERA in 193 games, one of which he started. In 302.1 innings, he had 24 saves, 121 games finished and 177 strikeouts. He allowed 253 hits, 111 runs, 99 earned runs, 21 home runs, 111 walks, 33 intentional walks and 18 wild pitches. As a batter, he went 7-for-31 for a .226 batting average. He never drew a base on balls, though he did have a stolen base in 1968. His career fielding percentage was .970.

In total, he appeared in 349 minor league games, going 65–55 with a 3.13 ERA in 1,041.1 innings. He allowed 952 hits, 461 runs, 362 earned runs and 399 walks. At the plate, he was used as a pinch hitter from time to time, hitting .267 with 107 hits (including 16 doubles and five triples) in 401 at bats.

== Early and personal life ==
Womack was born on August 25, 1939, in Columbia, South Carolina. Prior to playing professionally, he attended Brookland-Cayce High School in Cayce, South Carolina. He played in the PONY League as a youth, appearing in regional league finals in 1954. He never attended college.

His brothers, Alfred Womack and Larry Womack, were minor league pitchers who never reached the major leagues. Alfred, also known as "Al", pitched in the Cleveland Indians and Washington Senators systems in 1955 and 1956. Larry pitched in the Yankees' system in 1968.

Womack, who acquired his nickname "Dooley" as a child from a friend of his family and claimed, "I prefer it to my real name, which is Horace," was described as having a "high voice, a serious drawl and a giddy laugh", by Maury Allen in his book Where Have You Gone?. He was also described as a fan favorite, attributable to his smile and style.

== Professional career ==
=== Minor leagues ===
==== 1958–1959 ====
On June 25, 1958, Yankees scout Ted Petoskey signed the 18-year-old Womack to a contract, giving him a $2,500 bonus. He reported to the St. Petersburg Saints of the Class-D Florida State League the following day and on July 5, he made his first professional appearance, a start against the Cocoa Indians. In his first game, he allowed eight hits, four walks and three earned runs in seven innings, while striking out six batters, earning the victory. Offensively, he collected one hit in four at-bats and scored a run.

Womack pitched in 11 games for the Saints that season, making eight starts and going 6–3 with a 2.38 ERA, allowing 52 hits in 68 innings of work. He was the only pitcher on the 1958 Saints to ever make the major leagues. At the plate, he hit .276 with 4 RBI, collecting eight hits in 29 at-bats.

Prior to the start of the season, it was believed that Womack would begin 1959 with the St. Petersburg Saints, however he was released and sent to the Fargo-Moorhead Twins of the Class-C Northern League. He spent his entire season with the Twins, going 13–9 with a 4.50 ERA in 31 games (22 starts). In 172 innings, he allowed 175 hits, 18 home runs and 86 earned runs to score. He led the team in losses and home runs allowed and finished second in victories, games, games started, innings pitched, hits allowed, runs and earned runs allowed, and walks surrendered. He hit .274 with 11 RBI offensively, recording 20 hits — including five doubles — in 73 at-bats.

==== 1960–1961 ====
In 1960, Womack was the Greensboro Yankees' Opening Day starter and led the squad to a 7–3 victory in its first game, striking out eight batters and allowing eight hits and three walks. He started eight of his 22 appearances that year, going 5–6 with a 4.12 ERA. In 91 2/3 innings, he allowed 99 hits, 42 earned runs and 20 unearned runs in an injury-shortened season, while giving up 29 walks. He finished second on the team in losses. He also hit .271 with 7 RBI in 59 at-bats. He was the only Greensboro pitcher to eventually make the major leagues.

To begin the 1961 season, Womack worked as a reliever for the Binghamton Triplets of the Single-A Eastern League, pitching in five games and going 0–1 record with a 0.75 ERA. In 12 innings, he allowed eight hits while walking five batters. He was then sent to the Greensboro Yankees, with whom he pitched 27 games and made five starts, going 7–5 with a 4.47 ERA, finishing third on the team in hits allowed, with 107 in 86 2/3 innings. Combined, he went 7–6 with a 4.01 ERA in 32 games. He batted .229 in 48 at-bats.

==== 1962–1963 ====
In 1962, Womack fully transitioned to the bullpen and spent his entire season there, not making a single start. He pitched in 45 games for the Single-A Augusta Yankees of the South Atlantic League and went 3–2 with a 1.94 ERA. In 102 innings, he allowed 84 hits and 37 walks while striking out 70 batters. Of all pitchers on the squad with at least 10 innings of work, he had the lowest ERA, WHIP (1.186), walks per nine innings pitched ratio (3.3) and strikeout-to-walk ratio (1.89). He led the league in ERA. He hit .261 in 23 at-bats.

Pitching for the Augusta Yankees — now classified as Double-A — again in 1963, Womack went 3–8 with a 3.75 ERA in 41 games (six starts). In 108 innings, he allowed 106 hits and 27 walks while striking out 57 batters. He finished second on the team in appearances, behind Pete Mikkelsen, and tied for third in losses. At the plate, he hit .323 in 31 at-bats.

==== 1964–1965 ====
In 1964, Womack pitched for the Columbus Confederate Yankees of the Double-A Southern League and went 10–7 with 13 saves a 2.32 ERA in 50 relief appearances. In 124 innings, he allowed 96 hits and 43 walks, while striking out 96 batters. Despite being a relief pitcher, Womack led the team in victories, also pacing the squad in games pitched and strikeouts. He finished second on the team in ERA, innings pitched and hits allowed and second in the league in appearances, behind Dennis Higgins. He batted .291 in 55 at-bats at the plate and was used as a pinch hitter frequently.

Prior to the start of the 1965 season, Womack claimed that he was ready to pitch at the Triple-A level, the highest level of American professional baseball below the major leagues. "I've had three pretty good years in a row", he said, "I feel I can do the job." Womack received his wish, as he was assigned to the Triple-A Toledo Mud Hens on May 3. He went 10–4 with a 2.17 ERA in 34 games that season, making a return to the starting rotation as he started 13 games, six of which he completed. In 145 innings, he allowed 110 hits and 41 walks, striking out 73 batters. Though he did not lead the International League or his team in any categories, he finish second on the squad in victories (tied with Jack Curtis), winning percentage (.714), shutouts (three), innings pitched, walks and wild pitches (five, tied with Tom Dukes). Following the season, to ensure no other team could claim him, the Yankees added Womack to their 40-man roster and on October 19, he was promoted to the New York Yankees.

=== Major league debut ===
Though earlier in his career Womack was not considered a prospect, by 1966 Yankees general manager Ralph Houk had dubbed him a "possible valuable pitching [asset]." He earned a spot on the team's Opening Day roster out of that year's spring training, in part because the team was depleted by injuries.

Womack made his major league debut against the Detroit Tigers on April 14 at the age of 26. He appeared in relief of Pedro Ramos and pitched three innings, allowing one hit and no runs while hitting two batters (Al Kaline and Willie Horton) consecutively. He was then relieved by Jack Cullen. He did not receive a decision. On July 10, he made the first — and only — start of his career, facing the Washington Senators. In three innings, he allowed five runs on five hits and one walk, earning the loss.

He pitched 42 games that season, going 7–3 with a 2.64 ERA. In 75 innings, he allowed 52 hits and 23 walks, while striking out 50 batters. He led the team in WHIP (1.00) and hits per nine innings ratio (6.2), while finishing second in winning percentage (.700), ERA and hit batsmen (tied, three) and third in games finished (26), saves (four), home runs per nine inning ratio (0.7) and strikeouts per nine innings ratio (6.0). He began the season by not allowing a run in his first six appearances and later in the season had a stretch of 26 innings without allowing an earned run.

Following the season, Womack pitched for the Leones de Ponce of the Puerto Rico Baseball League.

=== Last years with the Yankees ===
In February 1967, prior to the team's first spring training workouts, Womack signed a major league contract with the Yankees.

On May 14, he was the winning pitcher when Mickey Mantle hit his 500th career home run. Of the event, Womack said, "Most guys wouldn't have even thought of the pitcher at such an important time. His home run won the ball game for me, and after the game he came over and shook hands and thanked me for the opportunity to celebrate."

Womack went 5–6 with 18 saves and a 2.41 ERA in 65 games in 1967, tying Pedro Ramos for the club record in pitching appearances. In 97 innings, he allowed 80 hits and 35 walks, while striking out 57 batters. He led the team in appearances, games finished (48), saves and intentional walks (14) and finished second on the squad in ERA. He was second in the league in appearances, behind Minnie Rojas, and fourth in appearances and saves.

Dissatisfied by contract offers proposed by the Yankees, Womack and fellow pitcher Al Downing did not initially report to spring training in 1968 — they were holding out for a better offer. Womack's holdout was short-lived, however, as within a couple of days he came to terms with the New York club and reported to camp.

The Yankees, who no longer had pitchers like Whitey Ford, Allie Reynolds and Vic Raschi on their roster, were counting on Womack to perform well in the upcoming campaign. "[The days of Ford, Reynolds and Raschi] were the Golden Days in New York", said The Sun on April 23, 1968, "...now...it's time for guys like Dooley Womack to begin prospecting at Yankee Stadium."

To begin the 1968 season, Womack posted a 5.56 ERA through his first six appearances and through his first 26 games, his ERA was 4.54. However, he posted a 1.61 ERA in his final 19 appearances of the season, en route to a 3–7 record with a 3.21 ERA on the year. In 45 appearances, he pitched 61 2/3 innings, striking out 26 batters and walking 29. He was not the team's main closer, as Steve Hamilton and Lindy McDaniel shared the role, though he managed to save two games and finish 36. He was the team's main reliever, however, leading the club in appearances and games finished, as well as intentional walks (tied, nine). He was fifth in the league in games finished and led the league's pitchers in fielding percentage.

On June 3, Womack started the American League's first triple play of the season. Facing the Minnesota Twins in the top of the eighth inning, Twins' batter John Roseboro hit a line drive back to Womack, who threw to third baseman Bobby Cox, doubling up baserunner Tony Oliva. Cox then threw to first baseman Mickey Mantle, who put out baserunner Bob Allison. This was the last triple play the team would turn until they performed the feat on April 22, 2010, against the Oakland Athletics.

=== Astros, Pilots, Reds and Athletics ===
On December 4, 1968, Womack was traded to the Houston Astros for outfielder Dick Simpson. He appeared in 30 games for the Astros that season, going 2–1 with a 3.51 ERA. On August 24, 1969, he was traded to the Seattle Pilots with pitcher Roric Harrison for pitcher Jim Bouton, and in nine games with the Seattle squad, he went 2–1 with a 2.59 ERA. Of the transaction, Bouton said, "Maybe it's me for a hundred thousand and Dooley Womack is just a throw-in. I'd hate to think that at this stage of my career I was being traded even-up for Dooley Womack." In total, Womack went 4–2 with a 3.29 ERA in 39 relief appearances that year. In 65 2/3 innings, he allowed 64 hits and 23 walks, while striking out 40 batters.

Following the 1969 season, Womack was sent back to the Astros in an unknown transaction. On December 16, he was traded with pitcher Pat House to the Cincinnati Reds for utility player Jim Beauchamp.

He spent most of the 1970 season with the Reds' Triple-A farm team, the Indianapolis Indians. In 47 relief appearances, he went 6–3 with 14 saves and a 2.19 ERA, leading the team in saves. In 74 innings, he allowed 59 hits and 29 walks, while striking out 53 batters.

On August 17, 1970, he was purchased by the Oakland Athletics from the Reds, making two appearances with the Oakland team. He posted a 15.00 ERA in three innings, allowing four hits, two home runs and five runs while striking out three batters. He played his final major league game on September 27 against the California Angels, striking out the last batter he faced, Jim Fregosi.

In 1971, he pitched in the minor leagues, going 2–7 with a 3.10 ERA in 36 relief appearances for the Athletics' Triple-A team, the Iowa Oaks. He led the team in wild pitches with 12 and tied Jim Panther for second on the squad in intentional walks, with seven. He was forced to retire after tearing his rotator cuff, an injury he suffered in September 1970.

== Post-playing career ==
After he retired from professional baseball, Womack returned to Columbia and began selling men's clothing, a profession he performed in the off-season during his playing days. He then entered the real estate business, working in that field for three to four years. Later, he began selling carpets and eventually, he began working for a commercial flooring company, a position he held for 23 years before retiring. He also coaches American Legion baseball teams.
