= PONY League =

PONY League may refer to one of the following:

- Pennsylvania–Ontario–New York League, commonly abbreviated PONY League, a defunct baseball minor league renamed as New York–Penn League in 1957
- PONY Baseball and Softball, a youth sports organization formed in 1951 and based in the U.S. state of Pennsylvania
  - Pony League, one of that organization's levels of play
  - Pony League World Series, an annual tournament staged since 1952
