= 1966 Los Angeles Dodgers season =

1966 Los Angeles Dodgers
- National League champions
- League: National League
- Ballpark: Dodger Stadium
- City: Los Angeles
- Record: 95–67 (.586)
- League place: 1st
- Owners: Walter O'Malley, James & Dearie Mulvey
- President: Walter O'Malley
- General managers: Buzzie Bavasi
- Managers: Walter Alston
- Television: KTTV (11)
- Radio: KFI; Vin Scully, Jerry Doggett; KWKW; José García, Jaime Jarrín

The 1966 Los Angeles Dodgers season was the 77th season for the Los Angeles Dodgers franchise in Major League Baseball (MLB), their 9th season in Los Angeles, California, and their 5th season playing their home games at Dodger Stadium in Los Angeles California. The Dodgers won the National League championship with a 95–67 record (1 1/2 games over the San Francisco Giants), but were swept by the Baltimore Orioles in the World Series.

== Regular season ==
Sandy Koufax became the first pitcher to win three Cy Young Awards in a career.

=== Season recap ===
The defending World Series champion Dodgers relied upon the same model that brought them the championship in 1965; great pitching, tight defense, and speed. However, pitchers Sandy Koufax and Don Drysdale held out nearly all of spring training due to a contract dispute, finally signing just before the start of the regular season. Drysdale had a sub par season going 13–16 with a 3.42 E.R.A. Koufax went 27–9 with a 1.73 E.R.A. Claude Osteen had his best season to date, winning 17 games with a 2.85 E.R.A., and rookie Don Sutton replaced Johnny Podres in the rotation, chipping in with 12 wins and a 2.99 E.R.A. Phil Regan had a good season, going 14–1 with 21 saves.

The National League race was a 4 team affair between the Dodgers, Giants, Pirates, and Phillies, with all but the Phillies taking their turn in 1st place during the summer. The Dodgers vaulted to the top with an 8-game win streak in mid-September. However, the pennant was still not decided until the final day of the season. The Giants, who had eliminated the Pirates by beating them on the next to last day, needed to beat the Pirates again in the season's final game, and then hope the Dodgers would lose both games of a double header in Philadelphia to the Phillies. If that happened, the Giants would have trailed the Dodgers by 1/2 game, and would still have had to fly to Cincinnati to play the Reds in a make-up game, needing a win to tie for 1st. The Giants defeated the Pirates in extra innings, and the Dodgers lost the first game of the double header, blowing a lead in the 8th inning. However, while the Giants were waiting at the Pittsburgh airport (not knowing if they were going to fly to Cincinnati or go home), Koufax beat the Phillies in the second game of the double header. While they were waiting, a reporter asked Giants pitcher Ron Herbel "you guys don't know where you're going yet, do you?" Herbel replied "we know where we're going. No way superman (Koufax) loses the second game."

=== Season standings ===
National League
Team	W	L	Pct.	GB	Home	Road
Los Angeles Dodgers	95	67	.586	—	53‍–‍28	42‍–‍39
San Francisco Giants	93	68	.578	1½	47‍–‍34	46‍–‍34
Pittsburgh Pirates	92	70	.568	3	46‍–‍35	46‍–‍35
Philadelphia Phillies	87	75	.537	8	48‍–‍33	39‍–‍42
Atlanta Braves	85	77	.525	10	43‍–‍38	42‍–‍39
St. Louis Cardinals	83	79	.512	12	43‍–‍38	40‍–‍41
Cincinnati Reds	76	84	.475	18	46‍–‍33	30‍–‍51
Houston Astros	72	90	.444	23	45‍–‍36	27‍–‍54
New York Mets	66	95	.410	28½	32‍–‍49	34‍–‍46
Chicago Cubs	59	103	.364	36	32‍–‍49	27‍–‍54

=== Record vs. opponents ===
1966 National League record Sources:
Team	ATL	CHC	CIN	HOU	LAD	NYM	PHI	PIT	SF	STL
Atlanta	—	7–11	10–8	14–4–1	7–11	14–4	11–7	7–11	8–10	7–11
Chicago	11–7	—	6–12	5–13	8–10	8–10	5–13	6–12	6–12	4–14
Cincinnati	8–10	12–6	—	4–14	6–12	10–7	10–8	8–10	7–10	11–7
Houston	4–14–1	13–5	14–4	—	7–11	7–11	7–11	4–14	6–12	10–8
Los Angeles	11–7	10–8	12–6	11–7	—	12–6	11–7	9–9	9–9	10–8
New York	4–14	10–8	7–10	11–7	6–12	—	7–11	5–13	9–9	7–11
Philadelphia	7-11	13–5	8–10	11–7	7–11	11–7	—	10–8	10–8	10–8
Pittsburgh	11–7	12–6	10–8	14–4	9–9	13–5	8–10	—	7–11	8–10
San Francisco	10–8	12–6	10–7	12–6	9–9	9–9	8–10	11–7	—	12–6
St. Louis	11–7	14–4	7–11	8–10	8–10	11–7	8–10	10–8	6–12	—

=== Opening Day lineup ===
Opening Day starters
Name	Position
Maury Wills	Shortstop
Wes Parker	First baseman
Willie Davis	Center fielder
Ron Fairly	Right fielder
Jim Lefebvre	Third baseman
Lou Johnson	Left fielder
John Roseboro	Catcher
Nate Oliver	Second baseman
Claude Osteen	Starting pitcher

=== Notable transactions ===
- April 26, 1966: signed Jim Gilliam out of retirement.
- May 10, 1966: Johnny Podres was acquired from the Dodgers by the Detroit Tigers.
- May 27, 1966: Howie Reed was traded by the Dodgers to the California Angels for Dick Egan and a player to be named later. The Angels completed the deal by sending John Butler (minors) to the Dodgers on December 7.
- May 28, 1966: Wes Covington was signed as a free agent by the Dodgers.
- July 5, 1966: Signed 1B Dick Stuart as a free agent.
- September 10, 1966: Thad Tillotson and cash were traded by the Dodgers to the New York Yankees for Dick Schofield.

=== Roster ===
1966 Los Angeles Dodgers
Roster
Pitchers: 21 Jim Brewer; 53 Don Drysdale; 32 Sandy Koufax; 15 Bob Miller; 38 Joe Moeller; 23 Claude Osteen; 16 Ron Perranoski; 22 Johnny Podres; 39 Howie Reed; 27 Phil Regan; 40 Bill Singer; 20 Don Sutton; 45 Nick Willhite	Catchers: 31 Jim Campanis; 8 John Roseboro; 10 Jeff Torborg; Infielders: 19 Jim Gilliam; 4 Tommy Hutton; 11 John Kennedy; 5 Jim Lefebvre; 29 Nate Oliver; 28 Wes Parker; 2 Dick Schofield; 2 Bart Shirley; 7 Dick Stuart; 30 Maury Wills	Outfielders: 17 Jim Barbieri; 25 Wes Covington; 12 Tommy Davis; 3 Willie Davis; 6 Ron Fairly; 9 Al Ferrara; 26 Derrell Griffith; 41 Lou Johnson; Other batters: 43 Willie Crawford	Manager: 24 Walter Alston; Coaches: 19 Jim Gilliam; 18 Preston Gómez; 33 Danny Ozark; 36 Lefty Phillips

== Game log ==
=== Regular season ===
Legend
	Dodgers win
	Dodgers loss
	Postponement
	Clinched pennant
**Bold**	Dodgers team member

1966 regular season game log: 95–67 (Home: 54–27; Away: 41–40)
April: 11–7 (Home: 8–4; Away: 3–3)

#	Date	Time (PT)	Opponent	Score	Win	Loss	Save	Time of Game	Attendance	Record	Box/ Streak

May: 16–11 (Home: 9–4; Away: 7–7)

#	Date	Time (PT)	Opponent	Score	Win	Loss	Save	Time of Game	Attendance	Record	Box/ Streak

June: 14–14 (Home: 3–4; Away: 11–10)

#	Date	Time (PT)	Opponent	Score	Win	Loss	Save	Time of Game	Attendance	Record	Box/ Streak

July: 18–10 (Home: 13–6; Away: 5–4)

#	Date	Time (PT)	Opponent	Score	Win	Loss	Save	Time of Game	Attendance	Record	Box/ Streak
—	July 12	11:00 a.m. PDT	37th All-Star Game	American League vs. National League (Busch Memorial Stadium, St. Louis, Missouri)							

August: 15–15 (Home: 9–5; Away: 6–10)

#	Date	Time (PT)	Opponent	Score	Win	Loss	Save	Time of Game	Attendance	Record	Box/ Streak

September: 20–9 (Home: 11–5; Away: 9–4)

#	Date	Time (PT)	Opponent	Score	Win	Loss	Save	Time of Game	Attendance	Record	Box/ Streak

October: 1–1 (Home: 0–0; Away: 1–1)

#	Date	Time (PT)	Opponent	Score	Win	Loss	Save	Time of Game	Attendance	Record	Box/ Streak

=== Detailed records ===
**National League**
Opponent	Home	Away	Total	Pct.	Runs scored	Runs allowed
Atlanta Braves	7–2	4–5	11–7	.611	78	62
Chicago Cubs	6–3	4–5	10–8	.556	63	59
Cincinnati Reds	7–2	5–4	12–6	.667	66	46
Houston Astros	5–4	6–3	11–7	.611	85	58
**Los Angeles Dodgers**	—	—	—	—	—	—
New York Mets	7–2	5–4	12–6	.667	93	54
Philadelphia Phillies	7–2	4–5	11–7	.611	62	44
Pittsburgh Pirates	5–4	4–5	9–9	.500	64	72
San Francisco Giants	4–5	5–4	9–9	.500	55	59
St. Louis Cardinals	4–5	6–3	10–8	.556	40	36
	**53–28**	**42–39**	**95–67**	**.586**	**606**	**490**

==== Month-by-Month ====
Month	Games	Won	Lost	Win %	RS	RA
April	18	11	7	0.611	60	47
May	27	16	11	0.593	110	89
June	28	14	14	0.500	106	98
July	28	18	10	0.643	85	69
August	30	15	15	0.500	125	111
September	29	20	9	0.690	111	69
October	2	1	1	0.500	9	7
Total	162	95	67	0.586	606	490

	Games	Won	Lost	Win %	RS	RA
Home	81	53	28	0.654	286	220
Road	81	42	39	0.519	320	270
Total	162	95	67	0.586	606	490

=== Composite Box ===
1966 Los Angeles Dodgers Inning–by–Inning Boxscore
Team	1	2	3	4	5	6	7	8	9	10	11	12	13	14	R	H	E
Opponents	63	61	43	41	57	47	61	63	42	6	2	1	1	1	490	1287	135
Dodgers	82	42	83	66	61	73	54	71	58	8	3	3	1	2	606	1399	133

=== Postseason Game log ===
1966 Postseason game log: 0–4 (Home: 0–2; Away: 0–2)
World Series: vs. Baltimore Orioles 0–4 (Home: 0–2; Away: 0–2)

#	Date	Time (PT)	Opponent	Score	Win	Loss	Save	Time of Game	Attendance	Series	Box Streak
1	October 5	1:00 p.m. PDT	Orioles	L 2–5	Drabowski (1–0)	**Drysdale** (0–1)	—	2:56	55,941	BAL 1–0	L1
2	October 6	1:00 p.m. PDT	Orioles	L 0–6	Palmer (1–0)	**Koufax** (0–1)	—	2:26	55,947	BAL 2–0	L2
3	October 8	10:00 a.m. PDT	@ Orioles	L 0–1	Bunker (1–0)	**Osteen** (0–1)	—	1:55	54,445	BAL 3–0	L3
4	October 9	11:00 a.m. PDT	@ Orioles	L 0–1	McNally (1–0)	**Drysdale** (0–2)	—	1:45	54,458	BAL 4–0	L4

== Starting Lineups ==
=== Regular Season ===
==== Batting Order ====
1966 Regular Season Batting Order game log
April

#	Date	Opponent	1st	2nd	3rd	4th	5th	6th	7th	8th	9th

May

#	Date	Opponent	1st	2nd	3rd	4th	5th	6th	7th	8th	9th
20	May 3	@ SF									
21	May 4	@ SF									
22	May 5	@ SF									
32	May 17	SF									
33	May 18	SF									
34	May 19	SF									

June

#	Date	Opponent	1st	2nd	3rd	4th	5th	6th	7th	8th	9th
54	June 10	@ SF									
55	June 11	@ SF									
56	June 12	@ SF									
61	June 17	SF									
62	June 18	SF									
63	June 19	SF									

July

#	Date	Opponent	1st	2nd	3rd	4th	5th	6th	7th	8th	9th

August

#	Date	Opponent	1st	2nd	3rd	4th	5th	6th	7th	8th	9th
126	August 26	@ SF									
127	August 27	@ SF									
128	August 28	@ SF									

September

#	Date	Opponent	1st	2nd	3rd	4th	5th	6th	7th	8th	9th
136	September 5	SF									
137	September 6	SF									
138	September 7	SF									

October

#	Date	Opponent	1st	2nd	3rd	4th	5th	6th	7th	8th	9th

==== Defensive Lineup ====
1966 Regular Season Defensive Lineup game log
April

#	Date	Opponent	C	1B	2B	3B	SS	LF	CF	RF	P

May

#	Date	Opponent	C	1B	2B	3B	SS	LF	CF	RF	P
20	May 3	@ SF									
21	May 4	@ SF									
22	May 5	@ SF									
32	May 17	SF									
33	May 18	SF									
34	May 19	SF									

June

#	Date	Opponent	C	1B	2B	3B	SS	LF	CF	RF	P
54	June 10	@ SF									
55	June 11	@ SF									
56	June 12	@ SF									
61	June 17	SF									
62	June 18	SF									
63	June 19	SF									

July

#	Date	Opponent	C	1B	2B	3B	SS	LF	CF	RF	P

August

#	Date	Opponent	C	1B	2B	3B	SS	LF	CF	RF	P
126	August 26	@ SF									
127	August 27	@ SF									
128	August 28	@ SF									

September

#	Date	Opponent	C	1B	2B	3B	SS	LF	CF	RF	P
136	September 5	SF									
137	September 6	SF									
138	September 7	SF									

October

#	Date	Opponent	C	1B	2B	3B	SS	LF	CF	RF	P

=== World Series ===
==== Batting Order ====
1966 Postseason Batting Order game log
World Series: vs. Baltimore Orioles

#	Date	Opponent	1st	2nd	3rd	4th	5th	6th	7th	8th	9th
1	October 5	BAL									
2	October 6	BAL									
3	October 8	@ BAL									
4	October 9	@ BAL									

==== Defensive Lineup ====
1966 Postseason Defensive Lineup game log
World Series: vs. Baltimore Orioles

#	Date	Opponent	C	1B	2B	3B	SS	LF	CF	RF	P
1	October 5	BAL									
2	October 6	BAL									
3	October 8	@ BAL									
4	October 9	@ BAL									

== Game Umpires ==
=== Regular Season ===
1966 Regular Season Umpire game log
April

#	Date	Opponent	HP	1B	2B	3B

May

#	Date	Opponent	HP	1B	2B	3B
20	May 3	@ SF	Shag Crawford (crew chief)	Ed Vargo	Doug Harvey	Harry Wendelstedt
21	May 4	@ SF	Ed Vargo	Doug Harvey	Harry Wendelstedt	Shag Crawford (crew chief)
22	May 5	@ SF	Doug Harvey	Harry Wendelstedt	Shag Crawford (crew chief)	Ed Vargo
32	May 17	SF	John Kibler	Bill Jackowski (crew chief)	Ed Sudol	Paul Pryor
33	May 18	SF	Bill Jackowski (crew chief)	Ed Sudol	Paul Pryor	John Kibler
34	May 19	SF	Ed Sudol	Paul Pryor	John Kibler	Bill Jackowski (crew chief)

June

#	Date	Opponent	HP	1B	2B	3B
54	June 10	@ SF	Chris Pelekoudas	Bob Engel	Frank Secory (crew chief)	Ken Burkhart
55	June 11	@ SF	Bob Engel	Frank Secory (crew chief)	Ken Burkhart	Chris Pelekoudas
56	June 12	@ SF	Frank Secory (crew chief)	Ken Burkhart	Chris Pelekoudas	Bob Engel
61	June 17	SF	Stan Landes	Mel Steiner	Al Barlick (crew chief)	Augie Donatelli
62	June 18	SF	Mel Steiner	Al Barlick (crew chief)	Augie Donatelli	Stan Landes
63	June 19	SF	Al Barlick (crew chief)	Augie Donatelli	Stan Landes	Mel Steiner

July

#	Date	Opponent	HP	1B	2B	3B

August

#	Date	Opponent	HP	1B	2B	3B
126	August 26	@ SF	Mel Steiner	Al Barlick (crew chief)	Augie Donatelli	Stan Landes
127	August 27	@ SF	Al Barlick (crew chief)	Augie Donatelli	Stan Landes	Mel Steiner
128	August 28	@ SF	Augie Donatelli	Stan Landes	Mel Steiner|	Al Barlick (crew chief)

September

#	Date	Opponent	HP	1B	2B	3B
136	September 5	SF	Bill Williams	Tom Gorman (crew chief)	Tony Venzon	Lee Weyer
137	September 6	SF	Tom Gorman (crew chief)	Tony Venzon	Lee Weyer	Bill Williams
138	September 7	SF	Tony Venzon	Lee Weyer	Bill Williams	Tom Gorman (crew chief)

October

#	Date	Opponent	HP	1B	2B	3B

=== World Series ===
1966 Postseason Umpire game log
World Series: vs. Baltimore Orioles

#	Date	Opponent	HP	1B	2B	3B	LF	RF
1	October 5	BAL	Bill Jackowski (NL) (crew chief)	Nestor Chylak (AL)	Chris Pelekoudas (NL)	John Rice (AL)	Mel Steiner (NL)	Cal Drummond (AL)
2	October 6	BAL	Nestor Chylak (AL)	Chris Pelekoudas (NL)	John Rice (AL)	Mel Steiner (NL)	Cal Drummond (AL)	Bill Jackowski (NL) (crew chief)
3	October 8	@ BAL	Chris Pelekoudas (NL)	John Rice (AL)	Mel Steiner (NL)	Cal Drummond (AL)	Bill Jackowski (NL) (crew chief)	Nestor Chylak (AL)
4	October 9	@ BAL	John Rice (AL)	Mel Steiner (NL)	Cal Drummond (AL)	Bill Jackowski (NL) (crew chief)	Nestor Chylak (AL)	Chris Pelekoudas (NL)

== Player stats ==
= Indicates team leader

= Indicates league leader

=== Batting ===
==== Starters by position ====
Note: Pos = Position; G = Games played; AB = At bats; H = Hits; Avg. = Batting average; HR = Home runs; RBI = Runs batted in

Pos	Player	G	AB	H	Avg.	HR	RBI
C	John Roseboro	142	445	123	.276	9	53
1B	Wes Parker	156	475	120	.253	12	51
2B	Jim Lefebvre	152	544	149	.274	24	74
SS	Maury Wills	143	594	162	.273	1	39
3B	John Kennedy	125	274	55	.201	3	24
LF	Lou Johnson	152	526	143	.272	17	73
CF	Willie Davis	153	624	177	.284	11	61
RF	Ron Fairly	117	351	101	.288	14	61

==== Other batters ====
Note: G = Games played; AB = At bats; H = Hits; Avg. = Batting average; HR = Home runs; RBI = Runs batted in

Player	G	AB	H	Avg.	HR	RBI
Tommy Davis	100	313	98	.313	3	27
Jim Gilliam	88	235	51	.217	1	16
Jeff Torborg	46	120	27	.225	1	13
Nate Oliver	80	119	23	.193	0	3
Al Ferrara	63	115	31	.270	5	23
Dick Stuart	38	91	24	.264	3	9
Jim Barbieri	39	82	23	.280	0	3
Dick Schofield	20	70	18	.257	0	4
Wes Covington	37	33	4	.121	1	6
Derrell Griffith	23	15	1	.067	0	2
Bart Shirley	12	5	1	.200	0	0
Tommy Hutton	3	2	0	.000	0	0
Jim Campanis	1	1	0	.000	0	0
Willie Crawford	6	0	0	----	0	0

=== Pitching ===
==== Starting pitchers ====
Note: G = Games pitched; IP = Innings pitched; W = Wins; L = Losses; ERA = Earned run average; SO = Strikeouts

Player	G	IP	W	L	ERA	SO
Sandy Koufax	41	323.0	27	9	1.73	317
Don Drysdale	40	273.2	13	16	3.42	177
Claude Osteen	39	240.1	17	14	2.85	137
Don Sutton	37	225.2	12	12	2.99	209

==== Other pitchers ====
Note: G = Games pitched; IP = Innings pitched; W = Wins; L = Losses; ERA = Earned run average; SO = Strikeouts

Player	G	IP	W	L	ERA	SO
Joe Moeller	29	78.2	2	4	2.52	31

==== Relief pitchers ====
Note: G = Games pitched; W = Wins; L = Losses; SV = Saves; ERA = Earned run average; SO = Strikeouts

Player	G	W	L	SV	ERA	SO
Phil Regan	65	14	1	21	1.62	88
Ron Perranoski	55	6	7	7	3.18	50
Bob Miller	46	4	2	5	2.77	58
Jim Brewer	13	0	2	2	3.68	8
Nick Willhite	6	0	0	0	2.08	4
Bill Singer	3	0	0	0	0.00	4
Howie Reed	1	0	0	0	0.00	1
Johnny Podres	1	0	0	0	0.00	1

== 1966 World Series ==
=== Game 1 ===
October 5, 1966, at Dodger Stadium in Los Angeles. Attendance: 55,941

Team	1	2	3	4	5	6	7	8	9	R	H	E
Baltimore (A)	3	1	0	1	0	0	0	0	0	5	9	0
Los Angeles (N)	0	1	1	0	0	0	0	0	0	2	3	0
W: Moe Drabowsky (1–0) L: Don Drysdale (0–1)
HR: BAL – Frank Robinson (1), Brooks Robinson (1) LAD – Jim Lefebvre (1)

=== Game 2 ===
October 6, 1966, at Dodger Stadium in Los Angeles. Attendance: 55,947

Team	1	2	3	4	5	6	7	8	9	R	H	E
Baltimore (A)	0	0	0	0	3	1	0	2	0	6	8	0
Los Angeles (N)	0	0	0	0	0	0	0	0	0	0	4	6
W: Jim Palmer (1–0) L: Sandy Koufax (0–1)

=== Game 3 ===
October 8, 1966, at Memorial Stadium in Baltimore, Maryland. Attendance: 54,445

Team	1	2	3	4	5	6	7	8	9	R	H	E
Los Angeles (N)	0	0	0	0	0	0	0	0	0	0	6	0
Baltimore (A)	0	0	0	0	1	0	0	0	X	1	3	0
W: Wally Bunker (1–0) L: Claude Osteen (0–1)
HR: BAL – Paul Blair (1)

=== Game 4 ===
October 9, 1966, at Memorial Stadium in Baltimore, Maryland. Attendance: 54,458

Team	1	2	3	4	5	6	7	8	9	R	H	E
Los Angeles (N)	0	0	0	0	0	0	0	0	0	0	4	0
Baltimore (A)	0	0	0	1	0	0	0	0	X	1	4	0
W: Dave McNally (1–0) L: Don Drysdale (0–2)
HR: BAL – Frank Robinson (2)

== Awards and honors ==
Hall of Famer Sandy Koufax

- Cy Young Award
  - Sandy Koufax
- Gold Glove Award
  - John Roseboro, catcher
- Comeback Player of the Year Award
  - Phil Regan

=== All-Stars ===
- 1966 Major League Baseball All-Star Game
  - Sandy Koufax, starter, pitcher
  - Jim Lefebvre, starter, second base
  - Phil Regan, reserve
  - Maury Wills, reserve

=== The Sporting News awards ===
- TSN Rookie Pitcher of the Year Award
  - Don Sutton
- TSN Pitcher of the Year Award
  - Sandy Koufax
- TSN Fireman of the Year Award
  - Phil Regan
- TSN National League All-Star
  - Sandy Koufax
- Hutch Award
  - Sandy Koufax

== Farm system ==
Level	Team	League	Manager
AAA	Spokane Indians	Pacific Coast League	Roy Hartsfield
AA	Albuquerque Dodgers	Texas League	Bob Kennedy
A	Santa Barbara Dodgers	California League	Norm Sherry
A	Jamestown Dodgers	New York–Penn League	Bill Berrier
A	Tri-City Atoms	Northwest League	Duke Snider
Rookie	Ogden Dodgers	Pioneer League	Tommy Lasorda

LEAGUE CHAMPIONS: Tri-City, Ogden

== 1966 Major League Baseball draft ==
This was the second Major League Baseball draft. The Dodgers drafted 67 players in the June draft and nine in the January draft. Nine of them eventually played in MLB. The top draft pick was pitcher Lawrence Hutton from Greenfield High School in Greenfield, Indiana. He played in the Dodgers farm system through 1971 and finished with a 22–28 record and 4.33 ERA in 117 games, never advancing past AA.

The most successful picks from this draft class were Bill Russell and Charlie Hough. Russell, the ninth-round pick out of Pittsburg High School played with the Dodgers through 1986, mostly as a shortstop and later managed the team from 1996 to 1998. Hough was drafted in the eighth round out of Hialeah High School as an infielder but quickly converted to pitcher. He played with the Dodgers through 1980 and then with three other teams until he retired in 1994. He later became a coach for the Dodgers organization.

1966 draft picks

=== January draft ===
This was the first year that a January draft was held for college and high school players who graduated in the winter.

Round	Name	Position	School	Signed	Career span	Highest level
1	James Roberts	RHP	University of Alabama	Yes	1966–1967	AA
2	Ivey Armstrong	2B	Miami-Dade College	Yes	1966–1969	A
3	Robert Childress	3B	Methacton High School	No		
4	Albert Choate	RHP	Sam Houston State University	Yes	1966–1967	A
5	Jorge Benitez	1B	Miami-Dade College	No		

==== January secondary phase ====
Round	Name	Position	School	Signed	Career span	Highest level
1	John Herbst	LHP	University of Southern California	No; Twins – 1967	1968–1969	A
2	Hank Tenney	OF	Vista High School	Yes	1966–1969	A
3	Jim Hibbs	C	Stanford University	Yes	1966–1973	MLB
4	Mike Garrett	OF	University of Southern California	No		

=== June draft ===
Round	Name	Position	School	Signed	Career span	Highest level
1	Lawrence Hutton	RHP	Greenfield High School	Yes	1966–1971	AA
2	John Gamble	SS	Carson City High School	Yes	1966–1976	MLB
3	Rich Thompson	2B	University of North Carolina	Yes	1966–1970	A
4	Jerry Bagwell	SS	Wren High School	Yes	1966–1967	A
5	Gordon Allen	OF	Ludlow High School	No; Astros – 1967	1967–1970	A
6	Dennis James	LHP	Albany High School	Yes	1966–1974	AAA
7	James Doran	OF	Madison Township High School	Yes	1967–1968	A-
8	Charlie Hough	INF	Hialeah High School	Yes	1966–1994	MLB
9	Bill Russell	OF	Pittsburg High School	Yes	1966–1986	MLB
10	Dennis Thornton	1B	Eisenhower High School	Yes	1966–1967	Rookie
11	Kenneth Burrow	C	De Anza High School	No		
12	Billy Grabarkewitz	3B	St. Mary's University	Yes	1966–1975	MLB
13	Romel Canada	OF	Chester High School	Yes	1966–1979	AAA
14	James Raynor	RHP	East Carolina University	Yes	1967–1972	AA
15	Ted Sizemore	C	University of Michigan	Yes	1966–1980	MLB
16	Allen Siflet	C	McCallum High School	No		
17	Kenneth Raab	RHP	Northview High School	Yes	1966–1967	A
18	Craig Menzl	1B	Islip High School	No		
19	Martin Parker	RHP	King High School	Yes	1966–1969	A
20	Loyd Colson	RHP	Gould High School	No; Yankees – 1967	1967–1973	MLB
21	John Jiles	OF	North Cobb High School	Yes	1966	Rookie
22	Charles Sutton	RHP	Tate High School	Yes	1967	Rookie
23	James Frye	RHP	Northern High School	Yes	1966–1970	A
24	Bill Ralston	2B	California Polytechnic State University	Yes	1966–1975	AAA
25	Bob Perruchon	OF	Vallejo Junior College	No; Angels – 1967	1967–1968	A
26	Kenneth Danson	C	Forrest High School	No; Indians – 1968	1968–1970	A
27	Lawrence Land	RHP	Bamberg High School	No		
28	Tom Alger	LHP	Hudson High School	Yes	1966–1973	A
29	Michael Pierce	LHP	Rincon High School	No; Indians – 1967	1967–1970	A
30	Stephen Howder	OF	City College of San Francisco	Yes	1966–1970	A-
31	Radford Mawhinney	OF	Santa Maria High School	No		
32	James Arkell	OF	Claremont College	Yes	1966	A-
33	Ronald Reece	RHP	Campbell High School	Yes	1966	Rookie
34	James McCray	OF	San Diego State University	Yes	1966	Rookie
35	David Nitchke	C	California State University Fresno	No		
36	Mark Harris	RHP	University of Maryland	No		
37	Robert Johnson	LHP	Trenton High School	Yes	1966–1970	A
38	Stephen Hockensmith	1B	Florida Southern College	Yes	1966	A-
39	Billy Carthel	OF	Sul Ross State University	No; Indians – 1967	1968–1974	AAA
40	Ray Lamb	RHP	University of Southern California	Yes	1966–1973	MLB
41	Donald Spain	RHP	Eisenhower High School	Yes	1966–1971	AA
42	Donny Tidwell	RHP	New Diana High School	Yes	1966	Rookie
43	Julio Guerrero	SS	Central High School	Yes	1966–1967	A
44	John Shulock	3B	Vero Beach High School	Yes	1967–1969	A
45	Dicky Shaw	SS	Central State University	Yes	1966	A
46	Jeffrey King	RHP	Mainland High School	Yes	1966–1970	AA
47	Richard LeBlanc	LHP	Forrest High School	Yes	1966–1967	Rookie
48	Lamar Haynes	LHP	Chipola College	Yes	1967	A
49	Jody Gioffoni	RHP	Santa Monica High School	No		
50	Kenneth Wiedemann	2B	West Covina High School	No		
51	Mark Johnson	OF	University of New Mexico	No		
52	Walter Pierce	OF	William Carey College	Yes	1966–1967	A
53	Jack Butorac	RHP	Montebello High School	No; Cardinals – 1969	1969–1970	A-
54	David Lindsey	LHP	Fremont High School	No; Pilots – 1969	1969–1979	AAA
55	Bob Randall	SS	Gove High School	No; Dodgers −1969	1969–1980	MLB
56	Francis Staab	RHP	Hays High School	Yes	1966–1968	A
57	John Turston	C	Archbishop Molloy High School	No		
58	Adrian Zabala	RHP	University of Florida	No; Indians – 1967	1967	Rookie
59	William Scott	SS	Germantown Academy	No		
60	Tom Smith	RHP	Foley High School	No; Athletics – 1968	1969–1972	AA
61	James Raynor	RHP	Hamilton High School	Yes	1966–1972	AA
62	Robert Chandler	2B	Rollins College	No		

==== June secondary phase ====
Round	Name	Position	School	Signed	Career span	Highest level
1	Bob Stinson	C	Miami-Dade College	Yes	1966–1980	MLB
2	Richard Schryer	OF	University of Michigan	Yes	1966–1968	A
3	James Carter	3B	Trinity University	Yes	1966–1967	A-
4	John Green	RHP	Gulf Coast Community College	No		
5	John Herbst	LHP	University of Southern California	No; Twins – 1967	1968–1969	A
