= Pat House =

American baseball player (born 1940)

- Relief pitcher
- Born: September 1, 1940 (age 85); Boise, Idaho, U.S.
- Batted: Left Threw: Left

MLB debut
- September 6, 1967, for the Houston Astros

Last MLB appearance
- September 29, 1968, for the Houston Astros

MLB statistics
- Win–loss record: 2–1
- Earned run average: 7.08
- Strikeouts: 8
- Stats at Baseball Reference

Teams
- Houston Astros (1967–1968)

Patrick Lory House (born September 1, 1940) is an American former left-handed Major League Baseball (MLB) relief pitcher who played from 1967 to 1968 for the Houston Astros. He was 6 feet 3 inches (1.91 m) tall and weighed 185 pounds (84 kg).

Before being signed by the Milwaukee Braves as an amateur free agent in 1962, House had attended Boise State University and University of Wyoming.

On November 29, 1966, House was drafted by the Astros from the Braves in the minor league draft. He made his major league debut on September 6, 1967, against the San Francisco Giants. In his first big league game, he threw a perfect inning in relief of Tom Dukes. The first batter House faced in the Major Leagues was Hall of Fame slugger Willie McCovey.

House played in a total of six games in 1967, allowing two runs in four innings for a 4.50 ERA.

His sophomore — and final — season was far less successful. Although it was "The Year of the Pitcher" — in which the league ERA was 2.96 — House posted a 7.71 ERA in 16 1/3 innings of work. In 18 games, he walked six and struck out six batters.

Overall, House pitched in a total of 24 games in his career, posting a 2–1 record and 7.08 ERA. Although he gave up 17 runs in 20 1/3 innings, none of those runs was the result of a home run. He did hit a rather high number of batters — about one every 6 2/3 innings. In the field, House had a 1.000 fielding percentage.

He played his final big league game on September 29, 1968, although he stuck around in the minors through 1971. On December 16, 1969, he was traded by the Astros with Dooley Womack to the Cincinnati Reds for Jim Beauchamp. House never played in the majors with the Reds.

He wore number 43 throughout his major league career.
