= Mel Steiner =

American baseball umpire (1916-1997)

- Born: November 29, 1916; New York City, New York, U.S.
- Died: May 6, 1997 (aged 80); Los Angeles, California, U.S.
- Occupation: Umpire
- Years active: 1961–1972
- Employer: National League

Melvin James Steiner (November 29, 1916 – May 6, 1997) was an American professional baseball umpire who worked in the National League from 1961 to 1972.

== Playing career ==
Melvin James Steiner was born November 29, 1916, in New York City. He was an outfielder in minor league baseball, playing nine seasons from 1940 to 1950. Teams he played for include the Tucson Cowboys (1940), Clovis Pioneers (1940–1942, 1950), Dallas Rebels (1942), San Diego Padres (1943–1944), Oakland Oaks (1944), Hollywood Stars (1945), Spokane Indians (1946), and Bisbee–Douglas Miners (1948). He pitched 10 innings combined in 1946 and 1948, and was a player-manager for Bisbee–Douglas Miners in the first half of the 1948 season.

== Umpiring career ==
Steiner umpired minor league baseball in the Pioneer Baseball League (1951–1953), Western International League (1953–1954), California League (1955), and Pacific Coast League (1955–1959). He umpired 1,917 Major League Baseball games in his 12-year career, including two World Series (1966 and 1972), two All-Star Games (1962 and 1968) and the 1969 National League Championship Series.

Steiner's first major league game was on April 11, 1961, at Candlestick Park as the left field umpire. He was the home plate umpire for the first major league game played outside the United States, when the Montreal Expos hosted the St. Louis Cardinals at Jarry Park Stadium on April 14, 1969. His final major league game was as the second base umpire in game seven of the 1972 World Series at Riverfront Stadium.

== Personal life and death ==
Steiner resided in Seal Beach, California, and married Mozelle Lecompte in 1942. He died on May 6, 1997, in Los Angeles.

== See also ==
- List of Major League Baseball umpires (disambiguation)
