= Greg Sims =

American baseball player (born 1946)

- Left fielder
- Born: June 28, 1946 (age 80); San Francisco, California
- Batted: Switch Threw: Right

MLB debut
- April 15, 1966, for the Houston Astros

Last MLB appearance
- May 19, 1966, for the Houston Astros

MLB statistics
- Batting average: .167
- Home runs: 0
- Runs batted in: 0
- Stats at Baseball Reference

Teams
- Houston Astros (1966)

Gregory Emmett Sims (born June 28, 1946) is an American former professional baseball player. During his nine-season (1965–1973) playing career, he spent part of one season, 1966, as a member of the Houston Astros of Major League Baseball. An outfielder, he was a switch-hitter who threw right-handed, stood 6 feet (1.8 m) tall and weighed 190 pounds (86 kg).

== Career ==
Sims had originally signed with the Pittsburgh Pirates and was selected by Houston after his first professional season in the Rule 5 draft. He made his Major League debut on April 15, 1965, as a defensive replacement for Astro left fielder Lee Maye, struck out in his only plate appearance, and recorded one putout in the field. Sims then made six other appearances as a pinch hitter before being sent to the Class A Durham Bulls of the Carolina League. In his penultimate MLB game, on May 14 at Connie Mack Stadium, Sims collected his only big-league hit, a single off Terry Fox in the 11th inning that helped to spark a three-run game-winning rally over the Philadelphia Phillies.
