= Candy Harris =

American baseball player (born 1947)

- Pinch runner / Pinch hitter
- Born: September 17, 1947 (age 78); Selma, Alabama, U.S.
- Batted: Switch Threw: Right

MLB debut
- April 13, 1967, for the Houston Astros

Last MLB appearance
- April 27, 1967, for the Houston Astros

MLB statistics
- Games played: 6
- At bats: 1
- Hits: 0
- Stats at Baseball Reference

Teams
- Houston Astros (1967)

Alonzo Harris (born September 17, 1947) is a former Major League Baseball player for the Houston Astros just at the beginning of the 1967 season (April 13-April 27). He had been signed by the Baltimore Orioles as an amateur free agent before the 1966 season, then drafted by the Houston Astros from the Orioles in the 1966 first-year draft (November 28, 1966) after attending John C. Fremont High School in South Los Angeles, CA.

During his one season in the Oriole farm system, Harris played a total of 97 games for three teams in the lower minors and hit a combined .287 (95-for 331). While playing for the Bluefield Orioles, the speedy outfielder led the Appalachian League with 34 stolen bases in just 58 games.

Harris began the 1967 season with the Houston club, and at the age of 19 was the sixth-youngest player to appear in a National League game that season. During his short time with the Astros, he was used as a pinch runner five times and as a pinch hitter one time, and never got a chance to play on defense. In his only major league at bat, he struck out against Mel Queen of the Cincinnati Reds.

From May 26 through the end of the season he was in the military service, and never again played in a big league game.

== Trivia ==
- One other player made his major league debut on the same day as Harris: pitcher Tom Seaver (April 13, 1967).
