= Lee Bales =

American baseball player (born 1944)

- Second baseman / Third baseman
- Born: December 4, 1944 (age 81); Los Angeles, California, U.S.
- Batted: Switch Threw: Right

MLB debut
- August 7, 1966, for the Atlanta Braves

Last MLB appearance
- October 1, 1967, for the Houston Astros

MLB statistics
- Batting average: .093
- On-base percentage: .231
- Putouts: 21
- Stats at Baseball Reference

Teams
- Atlanta Braves (1966); Houston Astros (1967)

Wesley Owen "Lee" Bales (born December 4, 1944) is an American former professional second baseman who played parts of two seasons in Major League Baseball (MLB). His professional career, which lasted from 1963 to 1968, included 31 games played for the Atlanta Braves and the Houston Astros. A switch-hitter who threw right-handed, he stood 5 feet 10 inches (1.78 m) and weighed 165 pounds (75 kg). The Braves signed him as a free agent in 1963. He graduated from Norwalk High School and attended Cerritos College and California State University, Long Beach.

Bales' two partial seasons in MLB were marred by offensive struggles. In 53 plate appearances, he mustered only four hits, all singles, along with eight bases on balls, one sacrifice bunt and one sacrifice fly. He had two runs batted in. Defensively, he started eight games at second base and played 82 of his total of 92 big-league innings at the "keystone sack." He made one error in 46 chances, for a .978 fielding percentage.

He now lives with his wife in Houston, Texas.
