= PONY Baseball and Softball =

American non-profit organizing baseball and softball for youth

Coordinates: 40°9′19.28″N 80°16′58.90″W

- Type: Non-profit
- Industry: Youth sports
- Founded: 1951; 75 years ago
- Headquarters: Washington, Pennsylvania
- Area served: United States, Mexico, Caribbean, Europe, Asia-Pacific
- Key people: Abraham Key, president
- Products: Baseball and softball—leagues and tournaments
- Website: pony.org

PONY Baseball and Softball is a non-profit organization with headquarters in Washington, Pennsylvania. Started in 1951, PONY organizes youth baseball and softball leagues and tournaments, as over 500,000 players annually play PONY in over 4,000 leagues throughout the United States and over 40 countries world-wide. The televised Pony League World Series held annually in August at Washington's Lew Hays Pony Field attracts teenage teams from around the world. Membership is open to children and young adults from age 4 to 23 and the leagues are organized in two-year age brackets with "and-under" programs. Hundreds of PONY players have gone on to Major League Baseball careers, including Hall of Fame inductees Tony Gwynn and Cal Ripken Jr.

== Origin of name ==
Children at the Washington, Pennsylvania, YMCA named the organization PONY, which stood for "Protect Our Neighborhood Youth." This later became "Protect Our Nation's Youth."

== Levels of play ==
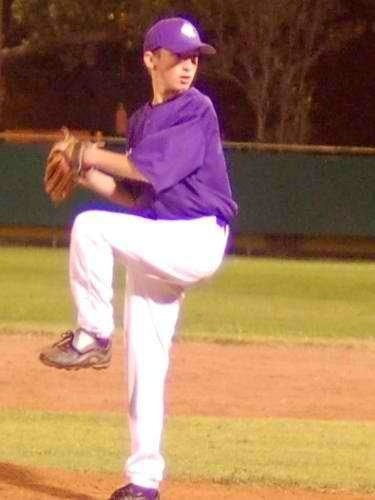
A 14-year-old Pony League pitcher

Distances shown are for baseball with players pitching; distances for other offerings (such as baseball with machine pitching, fast pitch softball, and slow pitch softball) may vary.

| League | Ages | Distances | | Ref. |
| League | Ages | Bases | Pitching | Ref. |
|---|---|---|---|---|
| Foal | 4 and 3 | 50 feet (15.24 m) | 38 feet (11.58 m) | |
| Shetland | 6 and under | 50 feet (15.24 m) | 38 feet (11.58 m) | |
| Pinto | 8 and under | 60 feet (18.29 m) | 40 feet (12.19 m) | |
| Mustang | 10 and under | 60 feet (18.29 m) | 46 feet (14.02 m) | |
| Bronco | 12 and under | 70 feet (21.34 m) | 50 feet (15.24 m) | |
| Pony | 14 and under | 80 feet (24.38 m) | 54 feet (16.46 m) | |
| Colt | 16 and under | 90 feet (27.43 m) | 60 feet 6 inches (18.44 m) | |
| Palomino | 19 and under | 90 feet (27.43 m) | 60 feet 6 inches (18.44 m) | |
| Thorobred | 23 and under | 90 feet (27.43 m) | 60 feet 6 inches (18.44 m) | |

== Pony League World Series ==
Pony League World Series
- Sport: Baseball
- Founded: 1952; 74 years ago
- Most recent champions: Taichung, Taiwan (2025)
- Most titles: Taipei, Taiwan (5) (Note: Championship teams from Taipei, the capital of Taiwan, are listed in Pony League World Series records under variant names: Taipei (2000), Taipei County (2016, 2018), Taipei City (2019), and New Taipei City (2022). Taipei City is the official name of the capital city, which is commonly known as Taipei. New Taipei City and Taipei County both refer to the "special municipality" where the capital city is located.)
- Broadcaster: MLB.com
- Sponsor: Dick's Sporting Goods
- Website: plws.org

The Pony League World Series is the flagship tournament of PONY Baseball and Softball. After the creation of the organization in 1951, there were already 505 teams across 106 leagues the following year. This prompted PONY to create the Pony League World Series in Washington County, Pennsylvania, which has hosted a majority of the tournaments since the inaugural edition in 1952.

From 1964 through 1983, the tournament did not have a set location and sometimes took place in other states: California (1964–1965, 1978), Iowa (1979–1980), Illinois (1967, 1974–1975), Nebraska (1966), Texas (1977), and Washington (1983). In 1981, World Series Tournaments, Incorporated (WSTI) was put in charge of running the tournament, and every tournament since 1984 has been played in Washington County, although no team from Pennsylvania has won the tournament since 1955.

The first team from outside the United States to play in the tournament was Monterrey, Mexico, in 1959—Monterrey had won the Little League World Series in 1957 and 1958. In 1968, international slots were added to the tournament, with teams from Canada and Venezuela participating. The first participant from Puerto Rico was a team from Cataño in 1971. The first non-US champion was a team from Monterrey in 1972. A team from Japan was the first non-Americas participant, in 1986. The first non-Americas champion was a team from Seoul, South Korea, in 1988.

The format of the tournament has differed; for most years it has been double-elimination, while at least the first tournament was single-elimination, and the finals were a best of three at least twice during the 1970s. Most editions of the tournament have been contested with a field of eight teams, but field size has been as small as four and as large as 10:

| Year(s) | Teams |
|---|---|
| 1952–1960 | 8 |
| 1961–1967 | 4 |
| 1968–1974 | 8 |
| 1975–1978 | 6 |
| 1979–1980 | 8 |
| 1981–1982 | 5 |
| 1983–2008 | 8 |
| 2009–2019 | 10 |
| 2020 | — |
| 2021 | 8 |
| 2022-2023 | 10 |

The tournament is currently sponsored by Dick's Sporting Goods and the games are streamed on MLB.com, the official site of Major League Baseball. The recent finals can also be found on YouTube.

After the 2020 edition was canceled due to the COVID-19 pandemic, the 2021 edition was staged with only US-based teams (including a team from Puerto Rico).

=== Champions ===
| Year | Winner | Score | Runner–Up | Ref. |
|---|---|---|---|---|
| 1952 | San Antonio, Texas | 2–1 | Brockton, Massachusetts | |
| 1953 | Fairmont, West Virginia | 7–6 | North Charleston, South Carolina | |
| 1954 | Monongahela, Pennsylvania | 8–2 | Chicago, Illinois | |
| 1955 | Washington, Pennsylvania | 4–0 | Youngstown, Ohio | |
| 1956 | Joliet, Illinois | 9–1 | Hamtramck, Michigan | |
| 1957 | Lufkin, Texas | 5–2 | Maywood, Illinois | |
| 1958 | Miami, Florida | 3–2 | Hamtramck, Michigan | |
| 1959 | Long Beach, California | 8–0 | Greene County, Pennsylvania | |
| 1960 | Oak Park - River Forest, Illinois | 5–4 | West Covina, California | |
| 1961 | Hamtramck, Michigan | 2–1 | San Antonio, Texas | |
| 1962 | Houston, Texas | 4–1 | Greensboro, North Carolina | |
| 1963 | Evansville, Indiana | 3–1 | Canoga Park, California | |
| 1964 | Campbell-Moreland, California | 8–2 | Gadsden, Alabama | |
| 1965 | Long Beach, California | 8–0 | Joliet, Illinois | |
| 1966 | Greensboro, North Carolina | 6–0 | Gadsden, Alabama | |
| 1967 | Chula Vista, California | 2–0 | Tulsa, Oklahoma | |
| 1968 | Greensboro, North Carolina | 4–1 | Covina, California | |
| 1969 | Honolulu, Hawaii | 8–5 | Arcadia, California | |
| 1970 | Buena Park, California | 1–0 | Cayce/West Columbia/Lexington, South Carolina | |
| 1971 | Orange, California | 6–5 | Denver, Colorado | |
| 1972 | Monterrey, Mexico | 2–0, 2–3, 3–1 | Honolulu, Hawaii | |
| 1973 | Santa Clara, California | 4–3 | Fort Worth, Texas | |
| 1974 | West Covina, California | 11–2 | Charlotte, North Carolina | |
| 1975 | Covina, California | 7–3, 4–3 | Wilmette, Illinois | |
| 1976 | Tampa, Florida | 14–0 | Monongahela, Pennsylvania | |
| 1977 | New Bedford, Massachusetts | 5–4 | Lake Worth, Florida | |
| 1978 | Campbell-Moreland, California | 2–0 | Joliet, Illinois | |
| 1979 | Campbell-Moreland, California | 10–3 | Houston, Texas | |
| 1980 | Maui, Hawaii | 3–2 | Greensboro, North Carolina | |
| 1981 | West Covina, California | 16–10 | Miami, Florida | |
| 1982 | West Covina, California | 5–4 | Washington, Pennsylvania | |
| 1983 | Santa Susana, California | 8–4 | Houston, Texas | |
| 1984 | Caguas, Puerto Rico | 3–0 | Miami, Florida | |
| 1985 | (Georgia (U.S. state)) Marietta, Georgia | 7–0 | Washington, Pennsylvania | |
| 1986 | Valencia, Santa Clarita, California | 3–2 | Edogawa, Japan | |
| 1987 | Caguas, Puerto Rico | 9–4 | Houston, Texas | |
| 1988 | Seoul, South Korea | 15–0 | La Mesa, California | |
| 1989 | Seoul, South Korea | 10–0 | Encino, California | |
| 1990 | Seoul, South Korea | 4–2 | Lakewood, California | |
| 1991 | San Juan, Puerto Rico | 8–2 | Fountain Valley, California | |
| 1992 | Bourbonnais, Illinois | 4–3 | Pasadena, Texas | |
| 1993 | Joliet, Illinois | 4–2 | Bayamon, Puerto Rico | |
| 1994 | (Taiwan) Taitung, Chinese Taipei | 6–1 | Chambersburg, Pennsylvania | |
| 1995 | Bayamon, Puerto Rico | 11–2 | Hagerstown, Maryland | |
| 1996 | (Taiwan) Tainan, Chinese Taipei | 4–0 | Evansville, Indiana | |
| 1997 | Danville, California | 7–0 | Hamilton, Ohio | |
| 1998 | (Taiwan) Taitung, Chinese Taipei | 4–0 | Washington, Pennsylvania | |
| 1999 | Covina, California | 9–1 | (Taiwan) Taitung, Chinese Taipei | |
| 2000 | (Taiwan) Taipei, Chinese Taipei | 8–3 | West Covina, California | |
| 2001 | Ponce, Puerto Rico | 10–4 | Richmond, Virginia | |
| 2002 | Norwalk, California | 10–0 | Levittown, Puerto Rico | |
| 2003 | Lakewood, California | 4–3 | Humacao, Puerto Rico | |
| 2004 | (Georgia (U.S. state)) Marietta, Georgia | 3–1 | Mililani, Hawaii | |
| 2005 | (Taiwan) Taichung, Chinese Taipei | 2–1 | San Diego, California | |
| 2006 | Caguas, Puerto Rico | 4–2 | Simi Valley, California | |
| 2007 | Trujillo Alto, Puerto Rico | 8–3 | Long Beach, California | |
| 2008 | Long Beach, California | 3–2 | (Taiwan) Taichung, Chinese Taipei | |
| 2009 | (Taiwan) Taitung, Chinese Taipei | 12–1 | Riverside/Victoria, California | |
| 2010 | Midlothian, Virginia | 3–1 | West Tokyo, Japan | |
| 2011 | Laredo, Texas | 10–9 | (Taiwan) Taipei County, Chinese Taipei | |
| 2012 | Long Beach, California | 9–7 | (Taiwan) Taoyuan County, Chinese Taipei | |
| 2013 | Okinawa, Japan | 5–4 | Los Mochis, Mexico | |
| 2014 | Hilo, Hawaii | 5–3 | (Taiwan) Taoyuan County, Chinese Taipei | |
| 2015 | (Taiwan) Taoyuan County, Chinese Taipei | 12–1 | San Bernardino, California | |
| 2016 | (Taiwan) Taipei County, Chinese Taipei | 12–2 | Maui, Hawaii | |
| 2017 | Covina, California | 3–1 | Seoul, South Korea | |
| 2018 | (Taiwan) Taipei County, Chinese Taipei | 3–1 | Long Beach, California | |
| 2019 | (Taiwan) Taipei City, Chinese Taipei | 9–1 | Bay County, Michigan | |
| 2020 | Not held | | | |
| 2021 | Brownsville, Texas | 11–10 | Youngstown, Ohio | |
| 2022 | (Taiwan) New Taipei City, Chinese Taipei | 4–1 | Monterrey, Mexico | |
| 2023 | Edogawa, Japan | 8–2 | Washington, Pennsylvania | |
| 2024 | Guaynabo, Puerto Rico | 2-1 | Tijuana, Mexico | |
| 2025 | Taichung, Taiwan | 6-4 | Washington, Pennsylvania | |
| 2026 | Shortened due to weather | | | |
| Year | Winner | Score | Runner–Up | Ref. |

Note: In cases of conflicting records, contemporary news reports have been given priority.

=== Controversy ===
In the 2023 Pony Asia-Pacific Zone Championships held in Fukushima, Japan, a controversial decision was made, where the Japanese officials unilaterally revoked Taiwan (Chinese Taipei)'s Pony League World Series qualification after losing to Taiwan in the championship game. The reason for disqualification was the alleged use of unapproved bats by the Taiwanese team. However, the PONY league pre-approved the bats prior to each game with stickers. There have also never been complaints from other teams prior to the championship game. In the end, despite Taiwan gathering supports from the majority of the teams, including Hong Kong (1 team) and Mainland China (3 teams) who protested against the decision to disqualify Taiwan, the complaint was overruled by Japan, Philippines and Australia, where the two decision-making officials were from Japan and Philippines.

The incident attracted widespread media attention in Taiwan due to the perceived lack of transparency and fairness. The Taoyuan City Government and Taiwan's Sports Administration immediately filed an official complaint to the PONY Baseball and Softball organization headquarters, and are waiting for a reply.

=== Championship totals ===
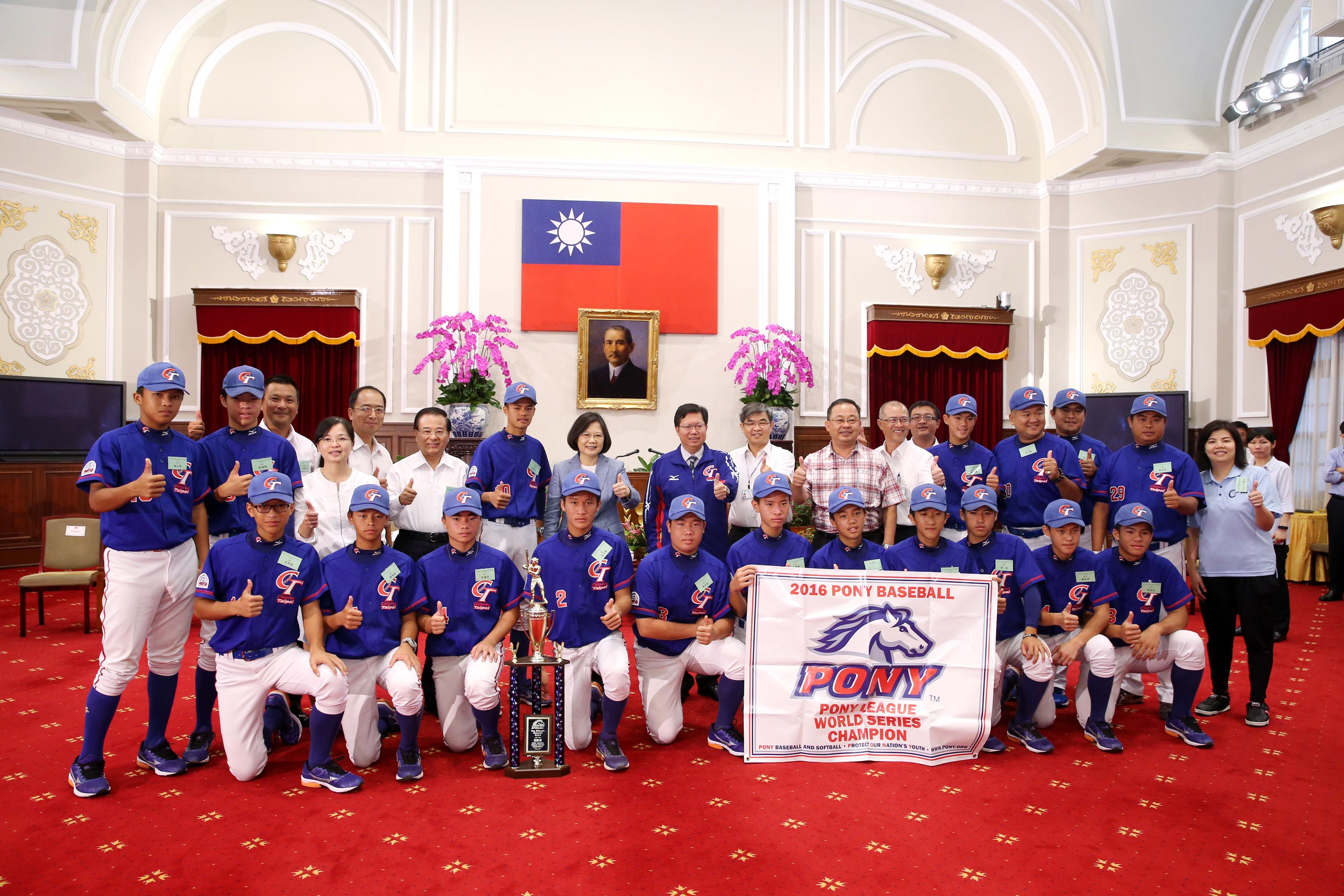
The 2016 championship team from Chinese Taipei (Taiwan)

By U.S. state or non-U.S. country. Updated through the 2025 championship (71 playings, 142 total appearances).

| State / Country | Wins | Losses | Appearances | Most recent championship |
|---|---|---|---|---|
| California | 22 | 15 | 37 | 2017 |
| (Taiwan) Chinese Taipei (Note: Due to complicated relations with the People's Republic of China, the Republic of China—commonly known as Taiwan—is recognized by the name Chinese Taipei by a majority of international organizations, including PONY Baseball and Softball. News accounts may use Republic of China, Taiwan, or Chinese Taipei to refer to the same entity.) | 12 | 5 | 17 | 2025 |
| Texas | 5 | 6 | 11 | 2021 |
| Puerto Rico | 8 | 3 | 11 | 2024 |
| Illinois | 4 | 5 | 9 | 1993 |
| Hawaii | 3 | 3 | 6 | 2014 |
| South Korea | 3 | 1 | 4 | 1990 |
| Pennsylvania | 2 | 8 | 10 | 1955 |
| Florida | 2 | 3 | 5 | 1976 |
| North Carolina | 2 | 3 | 5 | 1968 |
| (Georgia (U.S. state)) Georgia | 2 | 0 | 2 | 2004 |
| Michigan | 1 | 3 | 4 | 1961 |
| Japan | 2 | 2 | 4 | 2023 |
| Mexico | 1 | 2 | 3 | 1972 |
| Indiana | 1 | 1 | 2 | 1963 |
| Massachusetts | 1 | 1 | 2 | 1977 |
| Virginia | 1 | 1 | 2 | 2010 |
| West Virginia | 1 | 0 | 1 | 1953 |
| Ohio | 0 | 3 | 3 | — |
| Alabama | 0 | 2 | 2 | — |
| South Carolina | 0 | 2 | 2 | — |
| Colorado | 0 | 1 | 1 | — |
| Maryland | 0 | 1 | 1 | — |
| Oklahoma | 0 | 1 | 1 | — |

== Gallery ==
PONY Headquarters with Flag Plaza in view in foreground

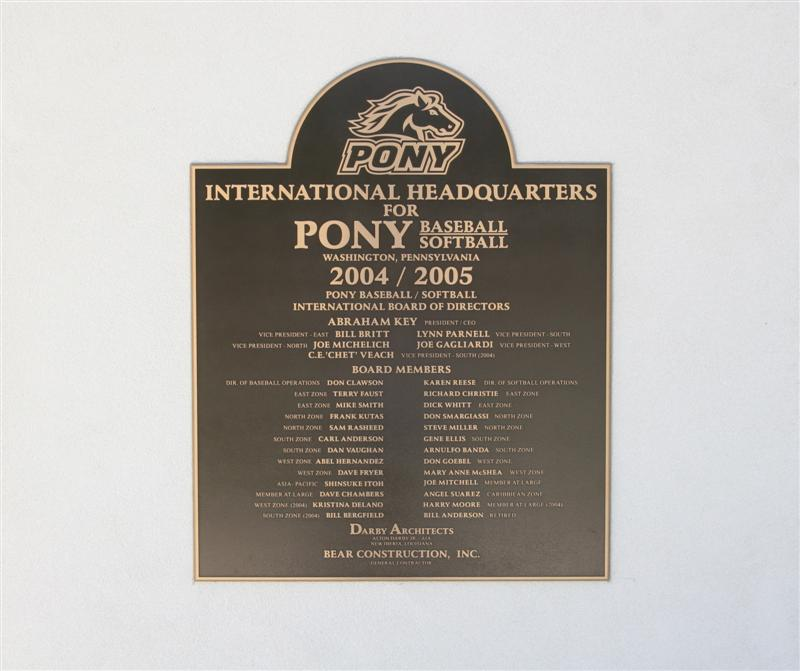
PONY Headquarters dedication plaque, located on building entrance

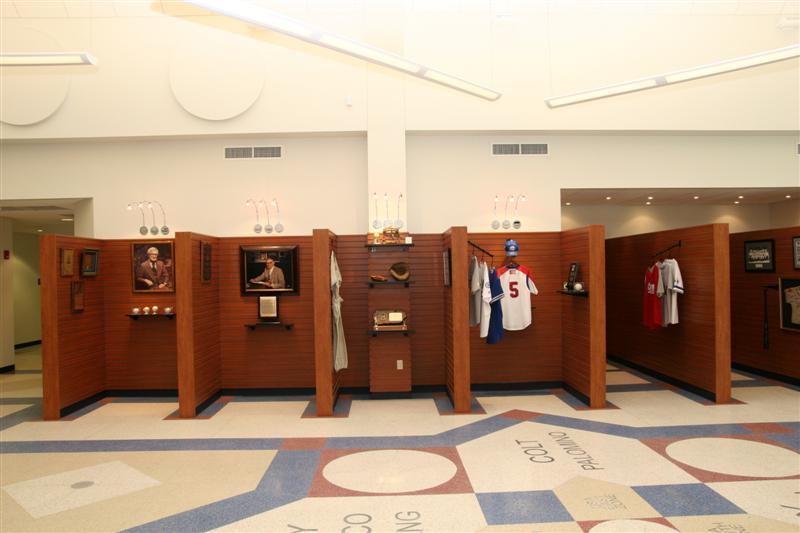
PONY Headquarters Main Hall / Museum

== See also ==
- Amateur baseball in the United States
- Baseball awards#PONY Baseball
