= Bill Heath (baseball) =

American baseball player (born 1939)

- Catcher
- Born: March 10, 1939 (age 86); Yuba City, California, U.S.
- Batted: Left Threw: Right

MLB debut
- October 3, 1965, for the Chicago White Sox

Last MLB appearance
- August 19, 1969, for the Chicago Cubs

MLB statistics
- Batting average: .236
- Home runs: 0
- Runs batted in: 13
- Stats at Baseball Reference

Teams
- Chicago White Sox (1965); Houston Astros (1966–1967); Detroit Tigers (1967); Chicago Cubs (1969)

William Chris Heath (born March 10, 1939) is an American former professional baseball player who played catcher in the Major Leagues in parts of four seasons between 1965 and 1969. He played for the Chicago Cubs, Detroit Tigers, Houston Astros, and Chicago White Sox.

== Biography ==
Heath graduated from Thomas Downey High School in Modesto, CA. He batted left-handed, threw right-handed, stood 5 feet 8 inches (1.73 m) tall and weighed 175 pounds (79 kg). During his eleven-year career (1960–1970) as a professional, he never played a full season in the Majors, but he was a solid hitter at the minor league level, batting .285 in 760 games.

As a Major Leaguer, Heath appeared in 112 games as a reserve catcher and pinch hitter; his 47 hits included six doubles and one triple.

Heath's wife and daughter were murdered during a home invasion in 1975. His daughter, Courtney (named for catcher Clint Courtney) was kidnapped during the invasion and was the subject of a highly publicized search.
