= Chuck Harrison (baseball) =

American baseball player (1941–2023)

- First baseman
- Born: April 25, 1941; Abilene, Texas, U.S.
- Died: December 30, 2023 (aged 82)
- Batted: Right Threw: Right

MLB debut
- September 15, 1965, for the Houston Astros

Last MLB appearance
- September 25, 1971, for the Kansas City Royals

MLB statistics
- Batting average: .238
- Home runs: 17
- Runs batted in: 126
- Stats at Baseball Reference

Teams
- Houston Astros (1965–1967); Kansas City Royals (1969, 1971)

Charles William Harrison (April 25, 1941 – December 30, 2023) was an American professional baseball player. He was a first baseman in Major League Baseball who played between 1965 through 1971 for the Houston Astros (1965–1967) and Kansas City Royals (1969, 1971). Listed at 5 ft 10 in (1.78 m), 190 lb (86 kg), Harrison batted and threw right-handed. He was signed by the Houston Colt .45s (the Astros' original nickname) in 1963 out of the Texas Tech University.

A native of Abilene, Texas, he attended Abilene High School. Harrison was 24 years old when he entered the majors with the Astros in 1965. He was a good athlete with an excellent glove work, who lacked the prototypical power for a first baseman. His most productive season came in 1966, when he posted career numbers in games (119), batting average (.256), runs (52), RBI (52), hits (111) and extra-base hits (34), including three four-hit games. But in 1967 Harrison became expendable with the emergence of Doug Rader at first base. (Rader actually became an excellent third baseman.) At the end of the season, he was sent by Houston along Sonny Jackson to the Atlanta Braves in the same transaction that brought Denny Lemaster and Denis Menke to the Astros. A year later, he was purchased by the Royals from Atlanta.

In a five-season career, Harrison was a .238 hitter (241-for-1012) with 17 home runs and 126 RBI in 328 games, including 94 runs, 43 doubles, six triples, and three stolen bases. At first base, he committed just 22 errors in 2464 chances for a .991 fielding percentage.

Harrison died on December 30, 2023, at the age of 82.
