= Tom Dukes =

American baseball player (born 1942)

- Relief pitcher
- Born: August 31, 1942 (age 83); Knoxville, Tennessee, U.S.
- Batted: Right Threw: Right

MLB debut
- August 15, 1967, for the Houston Astros

Last MLB appearance
- September 20, 1972, for the California Angels

MLB statistics
- Win–loss record: 5–16
- Earned run average: 4.35
- Strikeouts: 169
- Stats at Baseball Reference

Teams
- Houston Astros (1967–1968); San Diego Padres (1969–1970); Baltimore Orioles (1971); California Angels (1972)

Thomas Earl Dukes (born August 31, 1942) is an American former professional baseball player. The native of Knoxville, Tennessee, was a right-handed relief pitcher who appeared in 161 games over six seasons (1967–1972) for the Houston Astros, San Diego Padres, Baltimore Orioles and California Angels of Major League Baseball. He attended the University of Tennessee and was listed as 6 feet 2 inches (1.88 m) tall and 185 pounds (84 kg).

Dukes signed with the New York Yankees in 1960 but never appeared for the Bombers, who traded him to the Milwaukee Braves for veteran reliever Bobby Tiefenauer in June 1965. The Braves passed him along to the Astros in a six-player trade at the end of 1966. In August 1967 he finally made the majors in his eighth pro season, and he pitched out of the Houston bullpen through the end of 1968, working in 60 games and notching six saves. On October 14, he was the 33rd player selected by the Padres in the National League portion of the 1968 Major League Baseball expansion draft. He appeared in 66 total games for San Diego during 1969 and 1970, picking up 11 more saves.

He was traded along with Pat Dobson to the defending World Series Champion Orioles for Enzo Hernández, Tom Phoebus, Fred Beene and Al Severinsen on December 1, 1970. While his San Diego teammate Dobson became one of the 1971 Orioles' four twenty-game winners—and the Baltimore staff threw 71 complete games—Dukes was credited with four saves, tied for second on the team, but he lost five of six decisions for a team that won 101 regular-season games. Baltimore breezed to its third consecutive American League championship, but fell to the Pittsburgh Pirates in the 1971 World Series; Dukes worked in Games 3 and 5 and allowed no runs and two hits in four innings pitched, with one strikeout.

Dukes' last Oriole appearance was in Game 5 on October 14, 1971. He was sent to Triple-A Rochester to start 1972, then traded to the Angels on May 29. In seven June games with the Angels, he posted a 1.64 earned run average. He also appeared in six games for Triple-A Salt Lake City that year, his final campaign in pro ball.

As a big leaguer, Dukes compiled a 5–16 (.238) record and a 4.35 earned run average with 22 career saves. In 217 innings pitched, he permitted 226 hits and 82 bases on balls; he struck out 169.
