= List of Major League Baseball home run records =

This is a list of some of the records relating to home runs hit in baseball games played in the Major Leagues. Some Major League records are sufficiently notable to have their own page, for example the single-season home run record, the progression of the lifetime home run record, and the members of the 500 home run club. A few other records are kept on separate pages, they are listed below.

In the tables below, players and teams denoted in boldface are still actively contributing to the record noted, while (r) denotes a player's rookie season.

== Key ==
*	denotes elected to National Baseball Hall of Fame.
**Bold**	denotes active player.
**Ref.**	denotes references.

Players and the columns that correspond are denoted in boldface if they are still actively contributing to the record noted.

== Career records ==
=== Most seasons with 40 home runs ===
Player	Seasons	Seasons and teams	Ref.
Babe Ruth *	11	1920–21, 1923–24, 1926–32 (New York Yankees)	
Harmon Killebrew *	8	1959, 1961–64, 1967, 1969–70 (Washington Senators/Minnesota Twins)	
Hank Aaron *	8	1957, 1960, 1962–63, 1966, 1969, 1971, 1973 (Milwaukee/Atlanta Braves)	
Barry Bonds	8	1993, 1996–97, 2000–04 (San Francisco Giants)	
Alex Rodriguez	8	1998–2000 (Seattle Mariners), 2001–03 (Texas Rangers), 2005, 2007 (New York Yankees)	
Ken Griffey Jr. *	7	1993–94, 1996–99 (Seattle Mariners), 2000 (Cincinnati Reds)	
Sammy Sosa	7	1996, 1998–2003 (Chicago Cubs)	
Albert Pujols	7	2003–06, 2009–10, 2015 (St. Louis Cardinals, Los Angeles Angels of Anaheim)	
Mark McGwire	6	1987, 1992, 1996 (Oakland Athletics), 1997 (Oakland Athletics/St. Louis Cardinals), 1998–99 (St. Louis Cardinals)	
Jim Thome *	6	1997, 2001–02 (Cleveland Indians), 2003–04 (Philadelphia Phillies) 2006 (Chicago White Sox)	
Adam Dunn	6	2004–08 (Cincinnati Reds), 2008 (Arizona Diamondbacks), 2012 (Chicago White Sox)	
Willie Mays *	6	1954–55 (New York Giants), 1961–62, 64, 65 (San Francisco Giants)	

=== Most consecutive seasons with 40 home runs ===
Player	Seasons	Teams and seasons	Ref.
Babe Ruth *	7	1926–32 (New York Yankees)	
Alex Rodriguez	6	1998–2000 (Seattle Mariners), 2001–03 (Texas Rangers)	
Sammy Sosa	6	1998–2003 (Chicago Cubs)	
Ralph Kiner *	5	1947–51 (Pittsburgh Pirates)	
Duke Snider *	5	1953–57 (Brooklyn Dodgers)	
Adam Dunn	5	2004–08 (Cincinnati Reds)	
Barry Bonds	5	2000–04 (San Francisco)	
Ken Griffey Jr. *	5	1996–99 (Seattle), 2000 (Cincinnati)	

=== Most seasons with 30 home runs ===
Player	Seasons	Seasons and teams	Ref.
Hank Aaron *	15	1957–63, 1965–67, 1969–73 (Milwaukee/Atlanta Braves)	
Alex Rodriguez	15	1996, 1998–2000 (Seattle Mariners), 2001–03 (Texas Rangers), 2004–10, 15 (New York Yankees)	
Barry Bonds	14	1990, 1992 (Pittsburgh Pirates), 1993–2004 (San Francisco Giants)	
Albert Pujols	14	2001–11 (St. Louis Cardinals), 2012, 2015–16 (Los Angeles Angels)	
Babe Ruth *	13	1920–24, 1926–33 (New York Yankees)	
Mike Schmidt *	13	1974–77, 1979–87 (Philadelphia Phillies)	
Jimmie Foxx *	12	1929–35 (Philadelphia Athletics), 1936–40 (Boston Red Sox)	
Manny Ramirez	12	1995–96, 1998–2000 (Cleveland Indians), 2001–06 (Boston Red Sox), 08 (Boston-Los Angeles Dodgers)	
Jim Thome *	12	1996–2002 (Cleveland Indians), 2003–04 (Philadelphia Phillies), 2006–08 (Chicago White Sox)	
Frank Robinson *	11	1956, 1958–62, 1965 (Cincinnati Reds), 1966–67, 1969 (Baltimore Orioles), 1973 (California Angels)	
Willie Mays *	11	1954–57, 1959, 1961–66 (New York/San Francisco Giants)	
Mark McGwire	11	1987–90, 1992, 1995–96 (Oakland Athletics), 1997 (Oakland Athletics/St. Louis Cardinals), 1998–2000 (St. Louis Cardinals)	
Sammy Sosa	11	1993, 1995–2004 (Chicago Cubs)	
Carlos Delgado	11	1997–2004 (Toronto Blue Jays), 2005 (Florida Marlins), 2006, 2008 (New York Mets)	

=== Most consecutive seasons with 30 home runs ===
Player	Seasons	Seasons and teams	Ref.
Alex Rodriguez	13	1998–2000 (Seattle Mariners), 2001–03 (Texas Rangers), 2004–10 (New York Yankees)	
Barry Bonds	13	1992 (Pittsburgh Pirates), 1993–2004 (San Francisco Giants)	
Albert Pujols	12	2001–11 (St. Louis Cardinals), 2012 (Los Angeles Angels)	
Jimmie Foxx *	12	1929–35 (Philadelphia Athletics), 1936–40 (Boston Red Sox)	
Sammy Sosa	10	1995–2004 (Chicago Cubs)	
Carlos Delgado	10	1997–2004 (Toronto Blue Jays), 2005 (Florida Marlins), 2006 (New York Mets)	
Lou Gehrig *	9	1929–37 (New York Yankees)	
Eddie Mathews *	9	1953–61 (Milwaukee Braves)	
Mike Schmidt *	9	1979–87 (Philadelphia Phillies)	
Rafael Palmeiro	9	1995–98 (Baltimore Orioles), 1999–2003 (Texas Rangers)	
Jim Thome *	9	1996–2002 (Cleveland Indians), 2003–04 (Philadelphia Phillies)	
Manny Ramirez	9	1998–2000 (Cleveland Indians), 2001–06 (Boston Red Sox)	
Babe Ruth *	8	1926–33 (New York Yankees)	
Mickey Mantle *	8	1955–62 (New York Yankees)	
Albert Belle	8	1992–96 Cleveland Indians; 1997–98 Chicago White Sox; 1999 Baltimore Orioles	
Mike Piazza *	8	1995–97 (Los Angeles Dodgers), 1998 (Los Angeles Dodgers/Florida Marlins/New York Mets), 1999–2002 (New York Mets)	
Jeff Bagwell *	8	1996–2003 (Houston Astros)	
Mark Teixeira	8	2004–07 (Texas Rangers); 2007–08 (Atlanta Braves); 2008 (Los Angeles Angels); 2009–11 (New York Yankees)	
Edwin Encarnación	8	2012–16 (Toronto Blue Jays); 2017–18 (Cleveland Indians); 2019 (Seattle Mariners/New York Yankees)	

=== Most seasons with 20 home runs ===
Player	Seasons	Years and teams	Ref.
Hank Aaron *	20	1955–74 (Milwaukee/Atlanta Braves)	
Barry Bonds	19	1987–88, 90–92 (Pittsburgh Pirates), 1993–2004, 2006–07 (San Francisco Giants)	
Albert Pujols	18	2001–11, 2022 (St. Louis Cardinals), 2012, 2014–17, 2019 (Los Angeles Angels)	
Willie Mays *	17	1951, 1954–68, 1970 (New York/San Francisco Giants)	
Frank; Robinson *	17	1956–65 (Cincinnati Reds), 1966–67, 1969–71 (Baltimore Orioles), 1973 (California Angels), 1974 (California Angels/Cleveland Indians)	
Babe Ruth *	16	1919 (Boston Red Sox), 1920–34 (New York Yankees)	
Ted Williams *	16	1939–42, 1946–51, 1954–58, 1960 (Boston Red Sox)	
Jim Thome *	16	1994–2002 (Cleveland Indians), 2003–04 (Philadelphia Phillies), 2006–09 (Chicago White Sox), 2010 (Minnesota Twins)	
Reggie Jackson *	16	1968–75 (Oakland Athletics), 1976 (Baltimore Orioles), 1977–80 (New York Yankees), 1982, 1984–85 (California Angels)	
Eddie Murray *	16	1977–85, 1987–88 (Baltimore Orioles), 1989–90 (Los Angeles Dodgers), 1993 (New York Mets), 1995 (Cleveland Indians), 1996 (Cleveland Indians/Baltimore Orioles)	
Alex Rodriguez	16	1996–2000 (Seattle Mariners), 2001–03 (Texas Rangers), 2004–10, 2015 (New York Yankees)	
Fred McGriff *	15	1987–90 (Toronto Blue Jays), 1991–92 (San Diego Padres), 1993 (San Diego Padres/Atlanta Braves), 1994–97 (Atlanta Braves), 1999–2000 (Tampa Bay Devil Rays), 2001 (Tampa Bay Devil Rays/Chicago Cubs), 2002 (Chicago Cubs)	
Mel Ott *	15	1929–39, 1941–42, 1944–45 (New York Giants)	
Willie Stargell *	15	1964–76, 1978–79 (Pittsburgh Pirates)	
Dave Winfield *	15	1974, 1977–80 (San Diego Padres), 1982–83, 1985–88 (New York Yankees), 1990 (New York Yankees/California Angels), 1991 (California Angels), 1992 (Toronto Blue Jays), 1993 (Minnesota Twins)	
Ken; Griffey Jr. *	15	1990–94, 1996–99 (Seattle Mariners), 2000–01, 2004–07 (Cincinnati Reds)	
David Ortiz *	15	2002 (Minnesota Twins), 2003–2016 (Boston Red Sox)	

=== Most consecutive seasons with 20 home runs ===
Player	Seasons	Years and teams	Ref.
Hank Aaron *	20	1955–74 (Milwaukee/Atlanta Braves)	
Babe Ruth *	16	1919 (Boston Red Sox), 1920–34 (New York Yankees)	
Willie Mays *	15	1954–68 (New York/San Francisco Giants)	
Barry Bonds	15	1990–92 (Pittsburgh Pirates), 1993–2004 (San Francisco Giants)	
Alex Rodriguez	15	1996–2000 (Seattle Mariners), 2001–03 (Texas Rangers), 2004–10 (New York (AL))	
David Ortiz *	15	2002 (Minnesota Twins), 2003–2016 (Boston Red Sox)	
Eddie Mathews *	14	1952–65 (Boston Braves/Milwaukee Braves)	
Rafael Palmeiro	14	1991–93, 1999–2004 (Texas Rangers), 1994–98 (Baltimore Orioles)	
Manny Ramirez	14	1995–2000 (Cleveland Indians), 2001–07 (Boston Red Sox), 08 (Boston Red Sox/Los Angeles Dodgers)	
Mike Schmidt *	14	1974–1987 (Philadelphia Phillies)	
Chipper Jones*	14	1995–2008 (Atlanta Braves)	
Billy Williams *	13	1961–73 (Chicago Cubs)	
Willie Stargell *	13	1964–76 (Pittsburgh Pirates)	
Reggie Jackson *	13	1968–75 (Oakland Athletics), 1976 (Baltimore Orioles), 1977–80 (New York Yankees)	
Carlos Delgado	13	1996–2004 (Toronto Blue Jays), 2005 (Florida Marlins), 2006–08 (New York Mets)	

=== Most seasons as league leader in home runs ===
Player	Titles	Years and teams	Ref.
Babe Ruth *	12	1918–19 (Boston Red Sox), 1920–21, 1923–24, 1926–31 (New York Yankees)	
Mike Schmidt *	8	1974–76, 1980–81, 1983–84, 1986 (Philadelphia Phillies)	
Ralph Kiner *	7	1946–52 (Pittsburgh Pirates)	
Gavvy Cravath	6	1913–15, 1917–19 (Philadelphia Phillies)	
Mel Ott *	6	1932, 1934, 1936–38, 1942 (New York Giants)	
Harmon Killebrew *	6	1959, 1962–64, 1967, 1969 (Washington Senators/Minnesota Twins)	

see note^{1}

=== Most consecutive seasons as league leader in home runs ===
Player	Titles	Seasons & Teams	Ref.
Ralph Kiner *	7	1946–52 Pittsburgh	
Babe Ruth *	6	1926–31 New York (AL)	
Harry Davis	4	1904–07 Philadelphia (AL)	
Home Run Baker *	4	1911–14 Philadelphia (AL)	
Babe Ruth *	4	1918–19 Boston (AL); 1920–21 New York (AL)	
Gavvy Cravath	3	1913–15 Philadelphia (NL)	
Gavvy Cravath	3	1917–19 Philadelphia (NL)	
Hack Wilson *	3	1926–28 Chicago (NL)	
Chuck Klein *	3	1931–33 Philadelphia (NL)	
Harmon Killebrew *	3	1962–64 Minnesota	
Mike Schmidt *	3	1974–76 Philadelphia (NL)	
Ken Griffey Jr. *	3	1997–99 Seattle	
Alex Rodriguez	3	2001–03 Texas	

see note^{1}

=== League leader in home runs, both leagues ===
Player	League, team and year	Ref.
Buck Freeman	NL: Washington Senators (1899), AL: Boston Red Sox (1903)	
Sam Crawford *	NL: Cincinnati Reds (1901), AL: Detroit Tigers (1908)	
Fred McGriff *	AL: Toronto Blue Jays (1989), NL: San Diego Padres (1992)	
Mark McGwire	AL: Oakland Athletics (1987, 1996), NL: St. Louis Cardinals (1998–99)	
**Shohei Ohtani**	AL: Los Angeles Angels (2023), NL: Los Angeles Dodgers (2024)	

=== League leader in home runs, three different teams ===
Player	Teams and years	Ref.
Reggie Jackson *	Oakland Athletics (1973, 1975), New York Yankees (1980), California Angels (1982)	

=== Players who have hit at least one home run in 40 stadiums ===
Player	# of MLB Stadiums	Years	Ref.
Sammy Sosa	45	1989–2005, 07	
Ken Griffey Jr. *	44	1989–2009	
Fred McGriff *	43	1986–2004	
Ellis Burks	41	1987–2004	
Mike Piazza *	40	1992–2007	
Gary Sheffield	40	1988–2007	
Adrián Beltré *	40	1998–2018	

=== Most career grand slams ===
Player	Grand slams	Teams and years	Ref.
Alex Rodriguez	25	Seattle Mariners (1994–2000), Texas Rangers (2001–03), New York Yankees (2004–2013, 2015–2016)	
Lou Gehrig *	23	New York Yankees (1923–39)	
Manny Ramirez	21	Cleveland Indians (1993–2000), Boston Red Sox (2001–2008), Los Angeles Dodgers (2008–2010), Chicago White Sox (2010), Tampa Bay Rays (2011)	
Eddie Murray *	19	Baltimore Orioles (1977–88, 1996), Los Angeles Dodgers (1989–91, 1997), New York Mets (1992–93), Cleveland Indians (1994–96), Anaheim Angels (1997)	
Willie; McCovey *	18	San Francisco Giants (1959–73, 1977–80), San Diego Padres (1974–76), Oakland Athletics (1976)	
Robin Ventura	18	Chicago White Sox (1989–98), New York Mets (1999–2001), New York Yankees (2002–03), Los Angeles Dodgers (2003–04)	
Jimmie Foxx *	17	Philadelphia Athletics (1925–35), Boston Red Sox (1936–42), Chicago Cubs (1942, 1944), Philadelphia Phillies (1945)	
Ted Williams *	17	Boston Red Sox (1939–42, 1946–60)	
Babe Ruth *	16	Boston Red Sox (1914–19), New York Yankees (1920–34), Boston Braves (1935)	
Hank Aaron *	16	Milwaukee/Atlanta Braves (1954–74), Milwaukee Brewers (1975–76)	
Dave Kingman	16	San Francisco Giants (1971–74), New York Mets (1975–77, 1981–83), San Diego Padres (1977), California Angels (1977), New York Yankees (1977), Chicago Cubs (1978–80), Oakland Athletics (1984–86)	
Albert Pujols	16	2001–11, 2022 (St. Louis Cardinals), 2012–2021 (Los Angeles Angels Of Anaheim), 2021 (Los Angeles Dodgers)	

=== Most career walk-off home runs ===
Player	Walk-off HR	Teams and years	Ref.
Jim Thome *	13	1991–02, 2011 (Cleveland Indians), 2003–05, 2012 (Philadelphia Phillies) 2006–09 (Chicago White Sox), 2009 (Los Angeles Dodgers), 2010–11 (Minnesota Twins), 2012 (Baltimore Orioles)	
Albert Pujols	12	2001–11, 2022 (St. Louis Cardinals), 2012–2021 (Los Angeles Angels Of Anaheim), 2021 (Los Angeles Dodgers)	
Jimmie Foxx *	12	1925–35 (Philadelphia Athletics), 1936–42 (Boston Red Sox), 1942, 1944 (Chicago Cubs), 1945 (Philadelphia Phillies)	
Mickey; Mantle *	12	1951–68 (New York Yankees)	
Stan Musial *	12	1941–44, 1946–63 (St. Louis Cardinals)	
Frank; Robinson *	12	1956–65 (Cincinnati Reds), 1966–71 (Baltimore Orioles), 1972 (Los Angeles Dodgers), 1973–74 (California Angels), 1974–76 (Cleveland Indians)	
Babe Ruth *	12	1914–19 (Boston Red Sox), 1920–34 (New York Yankees), 1935 (Boston Braves)	

== Season records ==
=== Most home runs by a team in one season ===
HR	Team	Season
307	Minnesota Twins	2019
307	Atlanta Braves	2023
306	New York Yankees	2019
288	Houston Astros	2019
279	Los Angeles Dodgers	2019
274	New York Yankees	2025
267	New York Yankees	2018
264	Seattle Mariners	1997
262	Toronto Blue Jays	2021
260	Texas Rangers	2005
257	Baltimore Orioles	1996
257	Toronto Blue Jays	2010
257	Oakland Athletics	2019
256	Chicago Cubs	2019
254	New York Yankees	2022
253	Baltimore Orioles	2016
250	Milwaukee Brewers	2019
249	Houston Astros	2000
249	Atlanta Braves	2019
249	Los Angeles Dodgers	2023
247	Toronto Blue Jays	2019
246	Texas Rangers	2001
245	Seattle Mariners	1996
245	New York Yankees	2012
245	Boston Red Sox	2019
244	Seattle Mariners	1999
244	Toronto Blue Jays	2000
244	New York Yankees	2009
244	Los Angeles Dodgers	2025

=== Most grand slams by a player in one season ===
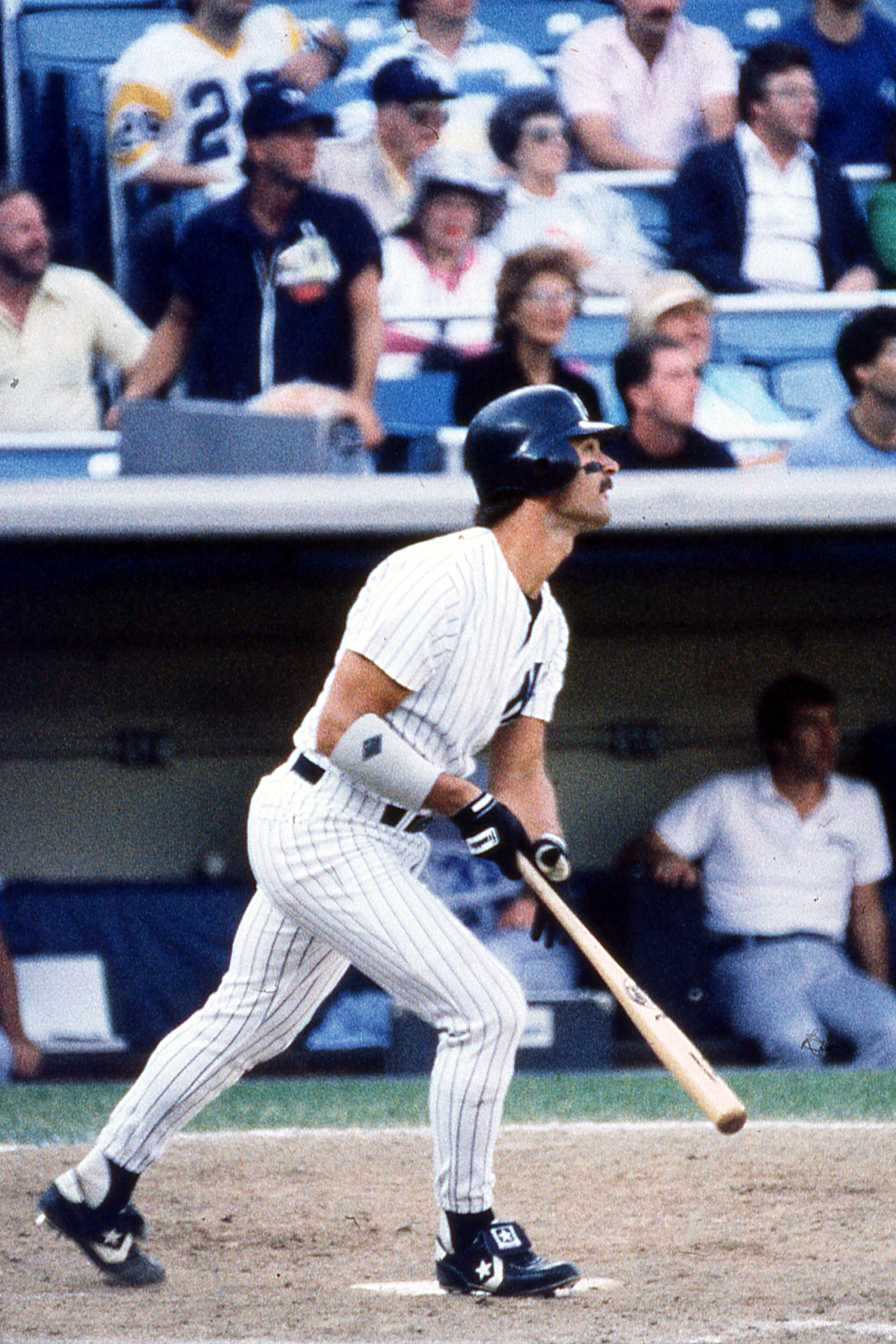
Don Mattingly (pictured in 1988) hit all six grand slams of his career in 1987.

Player	GS	Team	Season
Don Mattingly	6	New York Yankees	1987
Travis Hafner	6	Cleveland Indians	2006
Ernie Banks *	5	Chicago Cubs	1955
Jim Gentile	5	Baltimore Orioles	1961
Richie Sexson	5	Seattle Mariners	2006
Albert Pujols	5	St. Louis Cardinals	2009

=== Most home runs by a rookie player ===
Player	HR	Team	Season
**Pete Alonso**	53	New York Mets	2019
**Aaron Judge**	52	New York Yankees	2017
Mark McGwire	49	Oakland Athletics	1987
**Cody Bellinger**	39	Los Angeles Dodgers	2017
Frank Robinson *	38	Cincinnati Reds	1956
Wally Berger	38	Boston Braves	1930
Albert Pujols	37	St. Louis Cardinals	2001
Al Rosen	37	Cleveland Indians	1950
**Nick Kurtz**	36	Athletics	2025
**José Abreu**	36	Chicago White Sox	2014
Mike Piazza *	35	Los Angeles Dodgers	1993
Ron Kittle	35	Chicago White Sox	1983
Rudy York	35	Detroit Tigers	1937
Hal Trosky	35	Cleveland Indians	1934
Ryan Braun	34	Milwaukee Brewers	2007
Walt Dropo	34	Boston Red Sox	1950
**Ryan Mountcastle**	33	Baltimore Orioles	2021
Jose Canseco	33	Oakland Athletics	1986
Earl Williams	33	Atlanta Braves	1971
Jimmie Hall	33	Minnesota Twins	1963
Chris Young	32	Arizona Diamondbacks	2007
Matt Nokes	32	Detroit Tigers	1987
Tony Oliva *	32	Minnesota Twins	1964
**Sal Stewart**	31	Cincinnati Reds	2026
**Adolis García**	31	Texas Rangers	2021
**Eloy Jiménez**	31	Chicago White Sox	2019
Tim Salmon	31	California Angels	1993
Jim Ray Hart	31	San Francisco Giants	1964
Ted Williams *	31	Boston Red Sox	1939
Daniel Vogelbach	30	Seattle Mariners	2019
**Mike Trout**	30	Los Angeles Angels	2012
Nomar Garciaparra	30	Boston Red Sox	1997
Pete Incaviglia	30	Texas Rangers	1986
Willie Montañez	30	Philadelphia Phillies	1971
Bob Allison	30	Washington Senators	1959

== Game records ==
=== Four home runs by an individual in one game ===
Player	Team	Date	Opponent	Venue	Ref.
Bobby Lowe	Boston Beaneaters	May 30, 1894	Cincinnati Reds	South End Grounds	
Ed Delahanty *	Philadelphia Phillies	July 13, 1896	Chicago Colts	West Side Grounds	^{2}
Lou Gehrig *	New York Yankees	June 3, 1932	Philadelphia Athletics	Shibe Park	
Chuck Klein *	Philadelphia Phillies	July 10, 1936	Pittsburgh Pirates	Forbes Field	
Pat Seerey	Chicago White Sox	July 18, 1948	Philadelphia Athletics	Shibe Park	
Gil Hodges *	Brooklyn Dodgers	August 31, 1950	Boston Braves	Ebbets Field	
Joe Adcock	Milwaukee Braves	July 31, 1954	Brooklyn Dodgers	Ebbets Field	
Rocky Colavito	Cleveland Indians	June 10, 1959	Baltimore Orioles	Memorial Stadium	
Willie Mays *	San Francisco Giants	April 30, 1961	Milwaukee Braves	Milwaukee County Stadium	
Mike Schmidt *	Philadelphia Phillies	April 17, 1976	Chicago Cubs	Wrigley Field	
Bob Horner	Atlanta Braves	July 6, 1986	Montreal Expos	Fulton County Stadium	^{2}
Mark Whiten	St. Louis Cardinals	September 7, 1993	Cincinnati Reds	Riverfront Stadium	
Mike Cameron	Seattle Mariners	May 2, 2002	Chicago White Sox	Comiskey Park	
Shawn Green	Los Angeles Dodgers	May 23, 2002	Milwaukee Brewers	Miller Park	
Carlos Delgado	Toronto Blue Jays	September 25, 2003	Tampa Bay Devil Rays	SkyDome	
Josh Hamilton	Texas Rangers	May 8, 2012	Baltimore Orioles	Oriole Park at Camden Yards	
Scooter Gennett	Cincinnati Reds	June 6, 2017	St. Louis Cardinals	Great American Ball Park	
**J.D. Martinez**	Arizona Diamondbacks	September 4, 2017	Los Angeles Dodgers	Dodger Stadium	
**Eugenio Suárez**	Arizona Diamondbacks	April 26, 2025	Atlanta Braves	Chase Field	^{2}
**Nick Kurtz**	Athletics	July 25, 2025	Houston Astros	Daikin Park	
**Kyle Schwarber**	Philadelphia Phillies	August 28, 2025	Atlanta Braves	Citizens Bank Park	

=== Four consecutive home runs by a team in one game ===
Team	Date	Opponent	Players	Pitcher	Inn.	Venue
Milwaukee Braves	June 8, 1961	Cincinnati Reds	Eddie Mathews, Hank Aaron, Joe Adcock, Frank Thomas	Jim Maloney (2); Marshall Bridges	7th	Crosley Field
Cleveland Indians	July 31, 1963	Los Angeles Angels	Woodie Held, Pedro Ramos, Tito Francona, Larry Brown	Paul Foytack	6th	Cleveland Stadium
Minnesota Twins	May 2, 1964	Kansas City Athletics	Tony Oliva, Harmon Killebrew, Bob Allison, Jimmie Hall	Dan Pfister (3); Vern Handrahan	11th	Municipal Stadium
Los Angeles Dodgers	September 18, 2006	San Diego Padres	Jeff Kent, J. D. Drew, Russell Martin, Marlon Anderson	Jon Adkins (2); Trevor Hoffman	9th	Dodger Stadium
Boston Red Sox	April 22, 2007	New York Yankees	Manny Ramirez, J. D. Drew, Mike Lowell, Jason Varitek	Chase Wright	3rd	Fenway Park
Chicago White Sox	August 14, 2008	Kansas City Royals	Jim Thome, Paul Konerko, Alexei Ramírez, Juan Uribe	Joel Peralta (3); Robinson Tejeda	6th	U.S. Cellular Field
Arizona Diamondbacks	August 11, 2010	Milwaukee Brewers	Adam LaRoche, Miguel Montero, Mark Reynolds, Stephen Drew	Dave Bush	4th	Miller Park
Washington Nationals	July 27, 2017	Milwaukee Brewers	Brian Goodwin, Wilmer Difo, Bryce Harper, Ryan Zimmerman	Michael Blazek	3rd	Nationals Park
Washington Nationals	June 9, 2019	San Diego Padres	Howie Kendrick, Trea Turner, Adam Eaton, Anthony Rendon	Craig Stammen	8th	Petco Park
Chicago White Sox	August 16, 2020	St. Louis Cardinals	Yoan Moncada, Yasmani Grandal, José Abreu, Eloy Jiménez	Roel Ramírez	5th	Guaranteed Rate Field
St. Louis Cardinals	July 2, 2022	Philadelphia Phillies	Nolan Arenado, Nolan Gorman, Juan Yepez, Dylan Carlson	Kyle Gibson	1st	Citizens Bank Park

=== Home runs on three or more consecutive pitches ===
Team	Date	Opponent	Players	Pitcher	Inn.	Venue
Los Angeles Dodgers	September 18, 2006	San Diego Padres	JD Drew, Russell Martin, Marlon Anderson	Jon Adkins 1 Trevor Hoffman 2	9th	Dodger Stadium
Los Angeles Dodgers	June 12, 2007	New York Mets	Wilson Betemit, Matt Kemp, Hong-Chih Kuo	John Maine	2nd	Dodger Stadium
Cincinnati Reds	May 5, 2019	San Francisco Giants	Eugenio Suarez, Jesse Winker, Derek Dietrich	Jeff Samardzija	1st	Great American Ballpark
New York Yankees	September 17, 2020	Toronto Blue Jays	Giancarlo Stanton, DJ LeMahieu, Luke Voit	Chase Anderson	4th	Yankee Stadium
Los Angeles Angels	June 24, 2023	Colorado Rockies	Mike Trout, Brandon Drury, Matt Thaiss	Chase Anderson	3rd	Coors Field
New York Yankees	March 29, 2025	Milwaukee Brewers	Paul Goldschmidt, Cody Bellinger, Aaron Judge	Nestor Cortes	1st	Yankee Stadium

=== Two grand slams by one hitter in one game ===
Player	Team	Date	Opponent	Venue
Tony Lazzeri *	New York Yankees	May 24, 1936	Philadelphia Athletics	Shibe Park
Jim Tabor	Boston Red Sox	July 4, 1939^{3}	Philadelphia Athletics	Shibe Park
Rudy York	Boston Red Sox	July 27, 1946	St. Louis Browns	Sportsman's Park
Jim Gentile	Baltimore Orioles	May 9, 1961	Minnesota Twins	Metropolitan Stadium
Tony Cloninger^{4}	Atlanta Braves	July 3, 1966	San Francisco Giants	Candlestick Park
Jim Northrup	Detroit Tigers	June 24, 1968	Cleveland Indians	Cleveland Stadium
Frank Robinson *	Baltimore Orioles	June 26, 1970	Washington Senators	RFK Stadium
Robin Ventura	Chicago White Sox	September 4, 1995	Texas Rangers	The Ballpark in Arlington
Chris Hoiles	Baltimore Orioles	August 14, 1998	Cleveland Indians	Jacobs Field
Fernando Tatís^{5}	St. Louis Cardinals	April 23, 1999	Los Angeles Dodgers	Dodger Stadium
Nomar Garciaparra^{6}	Boston Red Sox	May 10, 1999	Seattle Mariners	Fenway Park
Bill Mueller^{7}	Boston Red Sox	July 29, 2003	Texas Rangers	The Ballpark in Arlington
Josh Willingham	Washington Nationals	July 27, 2009	Milwaukee Brewers	Miller Park

=== Three grand slams by a team in one game ===
Team	Players	Date	Opponent	Venue
New York Yankees	Robinson Canó, Russell Martin, Curtis Granderson	Aug 25, 2011	Oakland Athletics	Yankee Stadium

== Other ==
=== Most home runs on a single day (all teams combined) ===
Number of home runs	Date
62	July 2, 2002

=== Most walkoff home runs in a season (all teams combined) ===
Number of walkoff home runs	Year
98	2018

== See also ==
- Home run
- Grand slam
- List of Major League Baseball progressive career home runs leaders
- List of Major League Baseball career home run leaders
- List of Major League Baseball all-time leaders in home runs by pitchers
- List of Major League Baseball single-game grand slam leaders
- 500 home run club
- 20–20–20 club
- 30–30 club
- The Year Babe Ruth Hit 104 Home Runs

== Notes ==
1. Mark McGwire led the American League in home runs in 1987 and 1996. He led the National League in 1998 and 1999. In 1997, he led Major League Baseball in home runs, but led neither the American nor National League, as his season was split between the Oakland Athletics and St. Louis Cardinals. If that season were to be included, he would be the league leader for five seasons, four of which were in succession.
2. Delahanty, Horner, and Suárez are the only players to hit four home runs in a game as a part of a losing effort.
3. Game 2 of a doubleheader.
4. Tony Cloninger is unique on this list as the only pitcher.
5. Fernando Tatís is the only player to hit his two grand slams in the same inning: in the third inning off Chan Ho Park. It was also the Major League record for RBIs by a player in one inning (8).
6. Nomar Garciaparra is the only player to do so at home.
7. Bill Mueller is the only player to hit a grand slam from each side of the plate.
