= List of Major League Baseball single-inning runs batted in leaders =

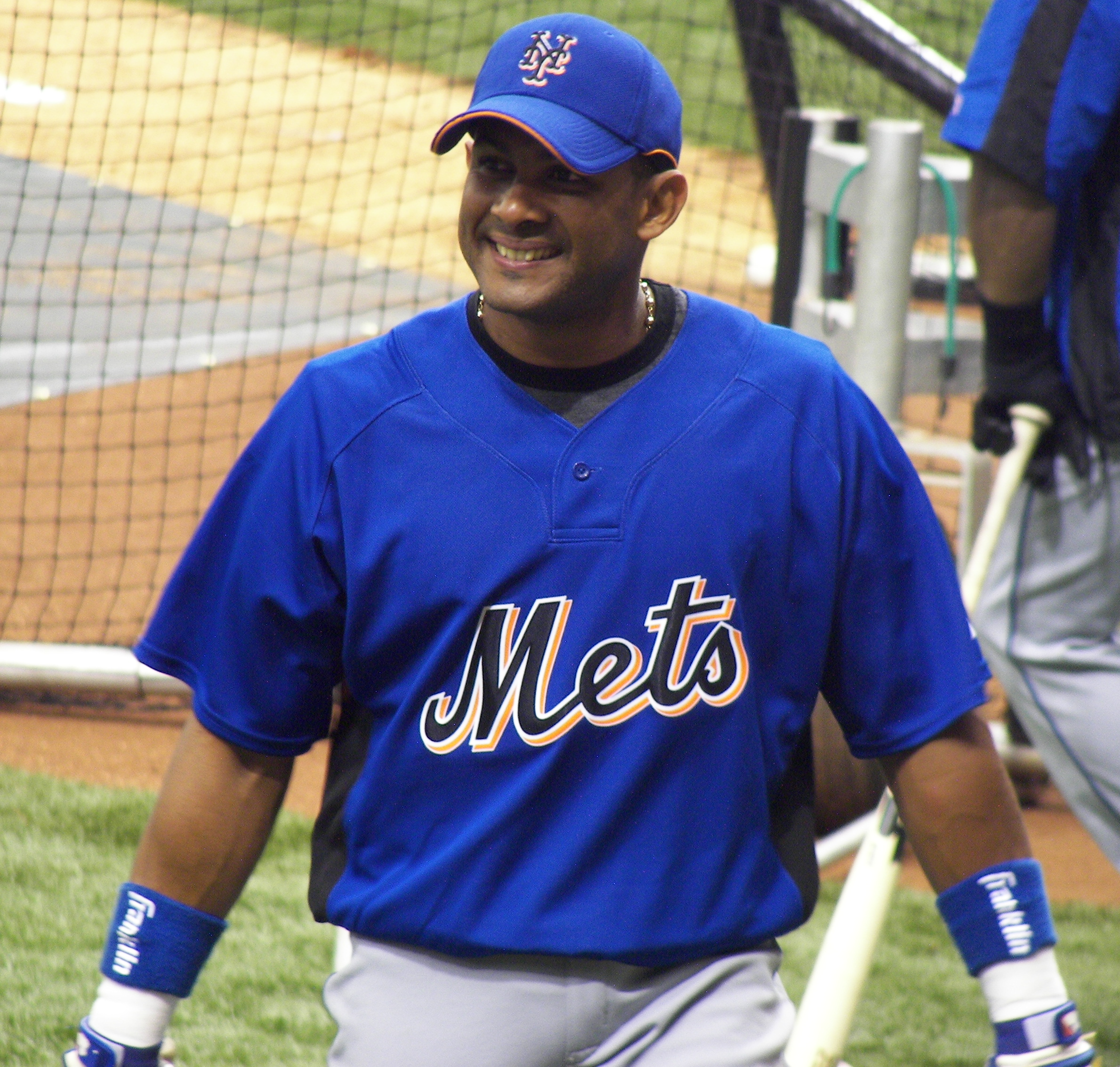
Fernando Tatís holds the MLB mark of 8 RBI in a single inning, set in 1999 with two grand slams.

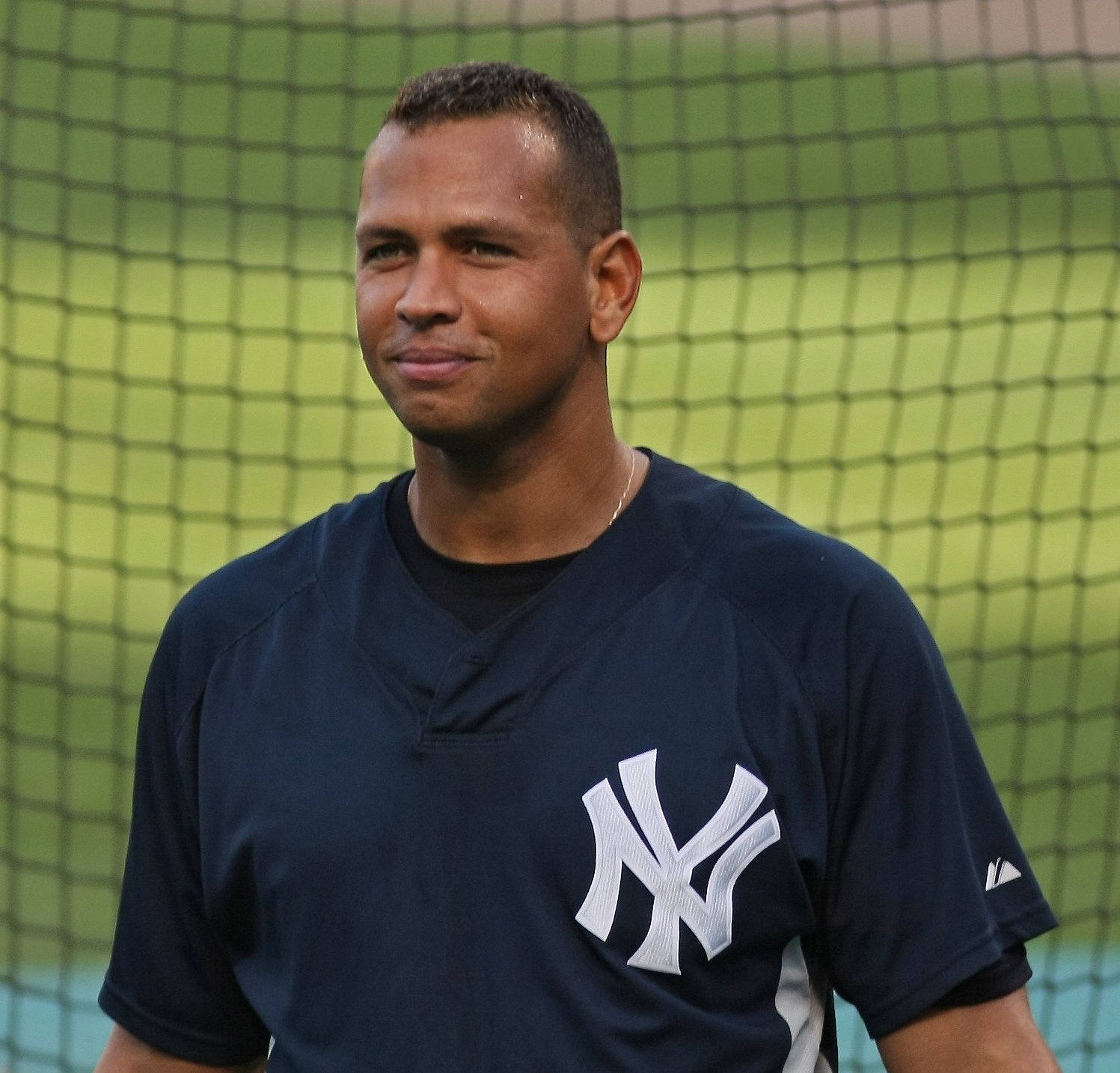
Alex Rodriguez set the AL mark with 7 RBI, in a game in which he reached 30 HR and 100 RBI for a record 13th consecutive season.

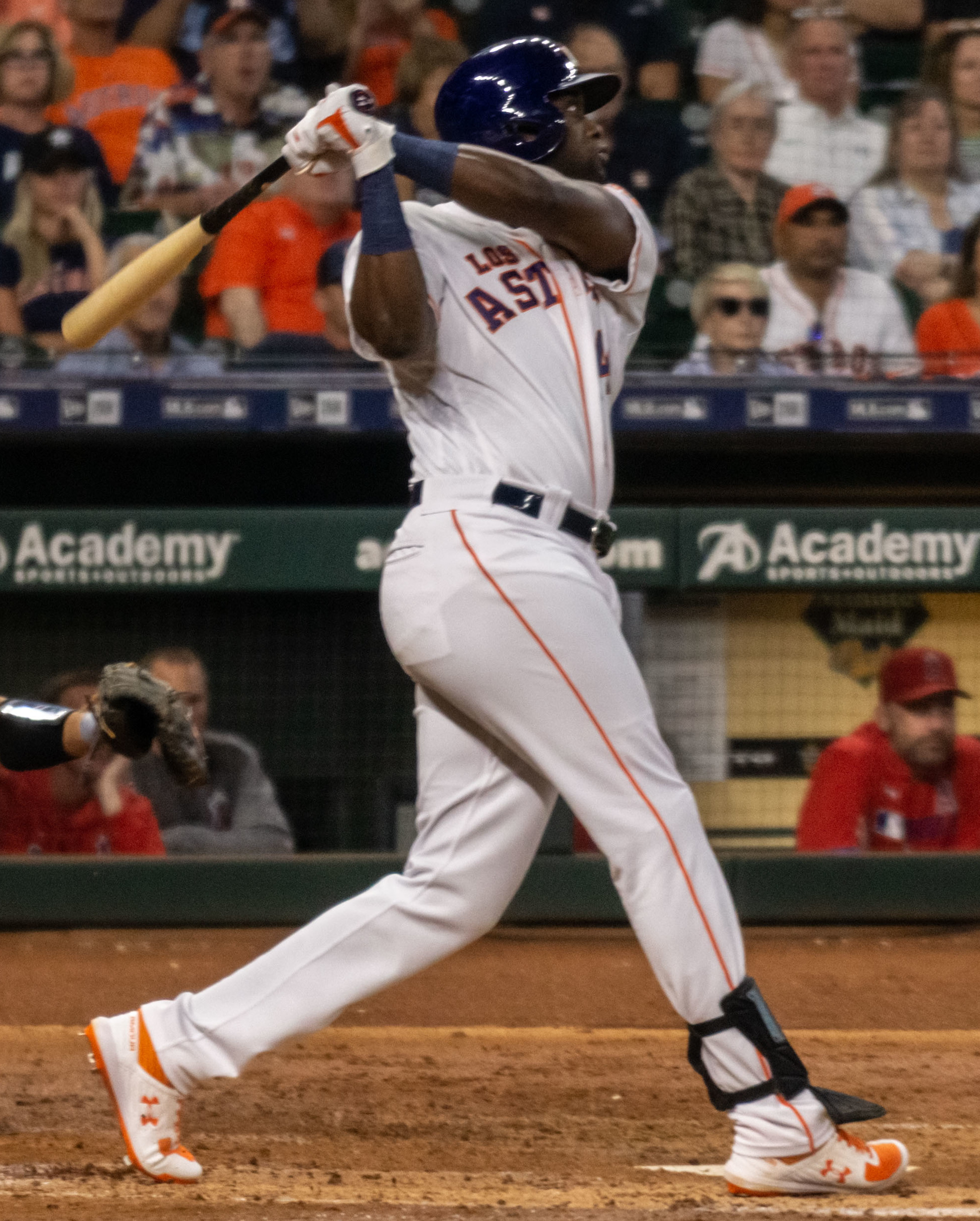
Yordan Alvarez is the most recent player to tie the 6-RBI mark, doing so on June 12, 2026.

The Major League Baseball (MLB) leaders in runs batted in (RBI) in one inning are topped by record holder Fernando Tatís, then with the St. Louis Cardinals, who set the MLB record with eight RBI in a 1999 game in which he hit two grand slams in the third inning of a game against the Los Angeles Dodgers. Alex Rodriguez set the American League mark, with seven RBI in the sixth inning of the New York Yankees' final game of the 2009 season, played against the Tampa Bay Rays.

Under Major League Baseball rule 10.04, a batter is credited with a Run Batted In during most circumstances where the batter's action at bat causes one or more runs to score, as set forth in this Rule 10.04. As the most RBI that can be scored in a single at bat is four (with a grand slam, in which a home run is hit with the bases loaded), scoring five or more RBI in a single inning requires at least two at bats with runs batted in during each at bat in that one inning, all of which combines to make this an extremely rare occurrence.

Since 1900, there have been 24 different players who have hit six or more RBI in a single inning. In 1911, Fred Merkle of the New York Giants became the first player in the modern era with six RBI in an inning and Bob Johnson became the first AL player to match the number when he did so in 1937.

All of the teams with a player with six or more RBI in an inning have won the game, usually in a blowout, though three of the games ended up with a two-run margin of victory: The Montreal Expos defeating the Chicago Cubs 17–15 in 1985 behind Andre Dawson, the Boston Red Sox by a score of 19–17 over the Texas Rangers behind David Ortiz, and the Houston Astros by a score of 10–8 over the Kansas City Royals behind Yordan Alvarez providing six RBI in the first inning. The feat has been accomplished three times each by players on the Red Sox and Yankees. The Washington Senators / Minnesota Twins franchise has allowed a player to knock in six RBI in an inning on three occasions. Griffith Stadium, the home of the Senators, was the site of three games where a player had six RBI in an inning. A batter has knocked in six RBI in an inning in all but the eighth inning, and never in extra innings, with seven players doing so in the first inning.

== Record holders ==
Tatís accomplished his major league baseball record in a game played by the St. Louis Cardinals on April 23, 1999, against the Los Angeles Dodgers at Dodger Stadium. Dodger starting pitcher Chan Ho Park entered the game's third inning with a 2–0 lead, but would implode in that frame, giving up a total of 11 runs (six of them earned) on six hits, an error and 48 pitches in the inning before being relieved by Carlos Pérez who was able to get the third out of the inning on three pitches. With no outs, Park loaded the bases on two singles and a walk before Tatís hit a grand slam to deep left field on a 2–0 count. Three more runs scored before Tatís would again come to the plate with the bases loaded, belting his second grand slam with two outs and a full count, to give Tatís the MLB record for most RBI in an inning and becoming the only MLB player to have hit two grand slams in a single inning.

Alex Rodriguez set the American League mark in a 10–2 victory by the Yankees over the Rays at Tropicana Field on the final day of the 2009 season. Rodriguez entered the game with 28 home runs and 93 RBI, leaving him likely to come up short in his bid for a 13th consecutive season of 30 home runs and 100 RBI. In the sixth inning, Rodriguez came to bat with two base runners after Johnny Damon led off with a double and Mark Teixeira walked. On the first pitch of his at bat, Rodriguez hit a home run off of Wade Davis to deep left field, scoring three runs. The Rays brought in Andy Sonnanstine to replace Davis and Rodriguez came to bat for the second time in the inning with three more runs having scored and the bases loaded after an intentional walk to Teixeira. With two outs and a count of 0–1, Rodriguez hit a grand slam to deep right center, giving him seven RBI for the inning to set the American League mark and setting an MLB record with his 13th consecutive season with 30 home runs and 100 RBI, breaking a tie of 12 seasons in a row with Jimmie Foxx, as well as with Manny Ramirez, who had 12 seasons non-consecutively. The 10 runs scored in the inning on six hits and a walk were the only runs the Yankees scored in the game.

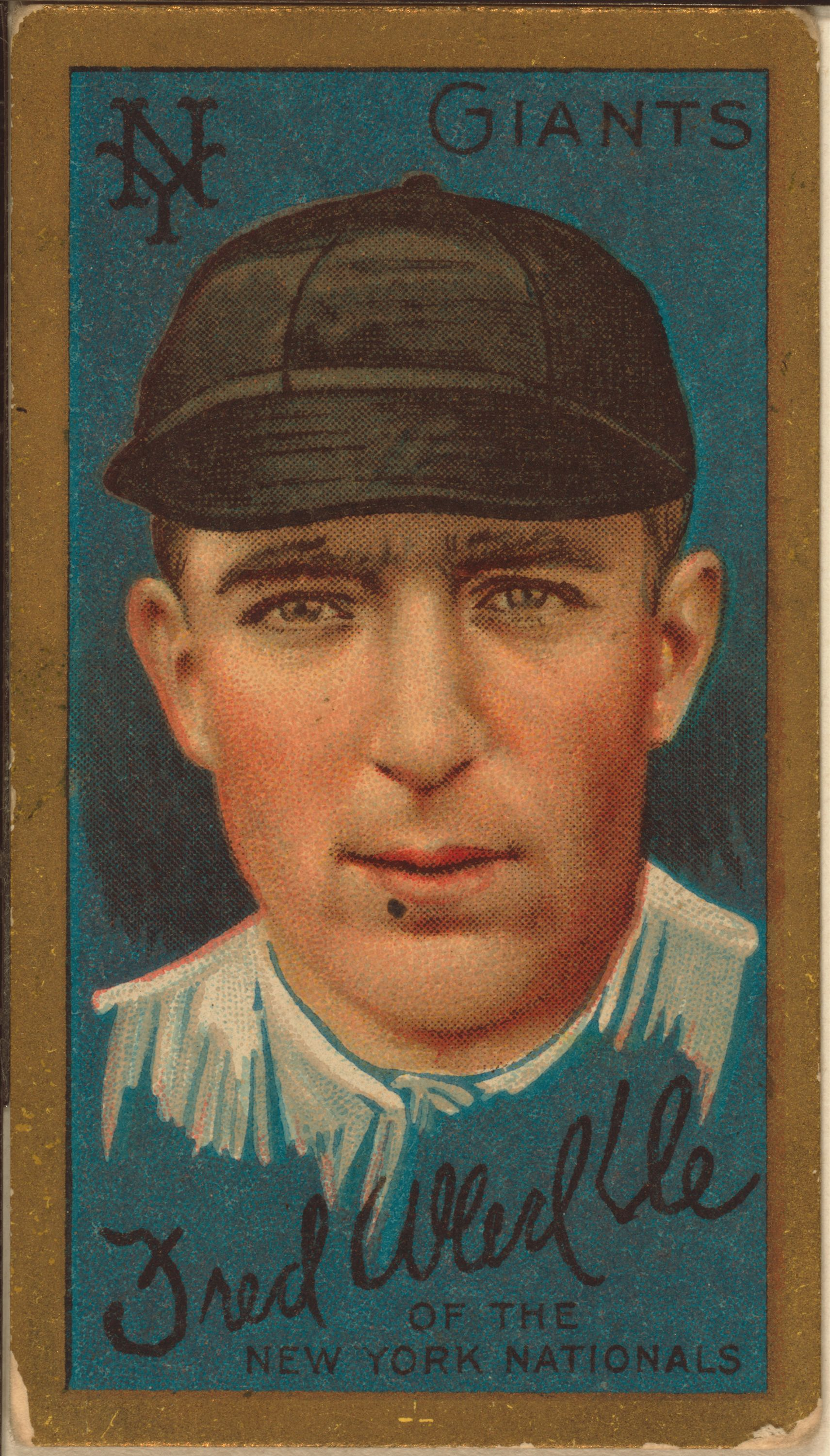
Fred Merkle set the modern era mark with 6 RBI in an inning of a game in 1911.

=== Earlier record holders ===
Fred Merkle of the Giants was the first to accomplish the feat of knocking in six runs in one inning in the modern, post-1900 era. He did this on May 13, 1911, in a game against the Cardinals played at Manhattan's Hilltop Park. Cardinal starting pitcher Slim Sallee had already given up three hits and a walk and was replaced by Bob Harmon when Merkle came to bat for the first time in the inning with runners on first and third, hitting an inside-the-park home run that scored three runs. For his second at bat, Merkle faced Lou Lowdermilk, the third Cardinal pitcher of the inning, with the bases loaded. Merkle hit a double to knock in three more base runners. After Al Bridwell singled him to third, Merkle scored on a double steal.

Though the Athletics had already been eliminated from the pennant race, they came out "with a vengeance", scoring 12 runs in the first inning of a doubleheader against the Chicago White Sox at Comiskey Park, breaking a record for runs in the first inning of 11 that had been set by the Red Sox on August 13, 1933. Bob Johnson was 5 for 6 with two home runs and 7 RBI, with the six RBI he knocked in during the first inning outburst setting a new American League record. In the first inning, he singled to knock in two runs on his first at bat and hit a grand slam in his second plate appearance to reach six RBI for the inning. Though the Athletics won the first game by a score of 19–0, they dropped game two by a score of 5–3.

After dropping the first game of a doubleheader to the Washington Senators at Griffith Stadium by a score of 4–0, the Red Sox came back to win the second game by a score of 15–4. In the second game, Tom McBride of the Red Sox came up twice in the fourth inning, clearing the bases in both at bats with a double and then a triple, yielding six runs to tie the record.

As part of a 12-run sixth inning, the Philadelphia Athletics scored a 16–5 win over the Washington Senators in a game played at Griffith Stadium. Joe Astroth went 3 for 5 in the game and tied the major league record for one inning, hitting a grand slam home run and a single to knock in another two runs.

== List of players with six or more RBI in one inning ==
24 players have knocked in six or more RBI in a single inning in MLB play since 1900. Though the current official designation of a Run Batted In was not officially set until 1920, the six RBI knocked in by Fred Merkle for the Giants in 1911 have been counted retrospectively using the modern definition of the statistic.

RBI	Player	Team	Date	Inning	Opponent	Final Score	Location	Reference
8	Fernando Tatís	St. Louis Cardinals	April 23, 1999	3rd	Los Angeles Dodgers	12–5 (Won)	Dodger Stadium	
7	Alex Rodriguez	New York Yankees	October 4, 2009	6th	Tampa Bay Rays	10–2 (Won)	Tropicana Field	
6	Fred Merkle	New York Giants	May 13, 1911	1st	St. Louis Cardinals	19–5 (Won)	Hilltop Park	
6	Bob Johnson	Philadelphia Athletics	August 29, 1937 (Game 1)	1st	Chicago White Sox	16–0 (Won)	Comiskey Park	
6	Tom McBride	Boston Red Sox	August 4, 1945 (Game 2)	4th	Washington Senators	15–4 (Won)	Griffith Stadium	
6	Joe Astroth	Philadelphia Athletics	September 23, 1950	6th	Washington Senators	16–5 (Won)	Griffith Stadium	
6	Gil McDougald	New York Yankees	May 3, 1951	9th	St. Louis Browns	17–3 (Won)	Sportsman's Park	
6	Sam Mele	Chicago White Sox	June 10, 1952	4th	Philadelphia Athletics	15–4 (Won)	Shibe Park	
6	Jim Lemon	Washington Senators	September 5, 1959	3rd	Boston Red Sox	14–2 (Won)	Griffith Stadium	
6	Jim Ray Hart	San Francisco Giants	July 8, 1970	5th	Atlanta Braves	13–0 (Won)	Atlanta–Fulton County Stadium	
6	Andre Dawson	Montreal Expos	September 24, 1985	5th	Chicago Cubs	17–15 (Won)	Wrigley Field	
6	Dale Murphy	Atlanta Braves	July 27, 1989	6th	San Francisco Giants	10–1 (Won)	Atlanta–Fulton County Stadium	
6	Carlos Quintana	Boston Red Sox	July 30, 1991	3rd	Texas Rangers	11–6 (Won)	Fenway Park	
6	Matt Stairs	Oakland A's	July 5, 1996	1st	Anaheim Angels	16–8 (Won)	Oakland-Alameda County Coliseum	
6	Matt Williams	Cleveland Indians	August 27, 1997	4th	Anaheim Angels	10–4 (Won)	Angel Stadium of Anaheim	
6	Juan Rivera	Montreal Expos	June 19, 2004	2nd	Chicago White Sox	17–14 (Won)	Olympic Stadium	
6	Bobby Abreu	New York Yankees	September 12, 2006	1st	Tampa Bay Devil Rays	12–4 (Won)	Yankee Stadium	
6	Raúl Ibáñez	Seattle Mariners	August 4, 2008	7th	Minnesota Twins	11–6 (Won)	Safeco Field	
6	David Ortiz	Boston Red Sox	August 12, 2008	1st	Texas Rangers	19–17 (Won)	Fenway Park	
6	Juan Uribe	San Francisco Giants	September 23, 2010	2nd	Chicago Cubs	13–0 (Won)	Wrigley Field	
6	Kendrys Morales	Los Angeles Angels of Anaheim	July 30, 2012	6th	Texas Rangers	15–8 (Won)	Rangers Ballpark in Arlington	
6	Yoenis Céspedes	New York Mets	April 29, 2016	3rd	San Francisco Giants	13-1 (Won)	Citi Field	
6	Cody Bellinger	Los Angeles Dodgers	June 2, 2021	1st	St. Louis Cardinals	14-3 (Won)	Dodger Stadium	
6	Yordan Alvarez	Houston Astros	June 12, 2026	1st	Kansas City Royals	10-8 (Won)	Kauffman Stadium	
