= Chris Hoiles =

American baseball player (born 1965)

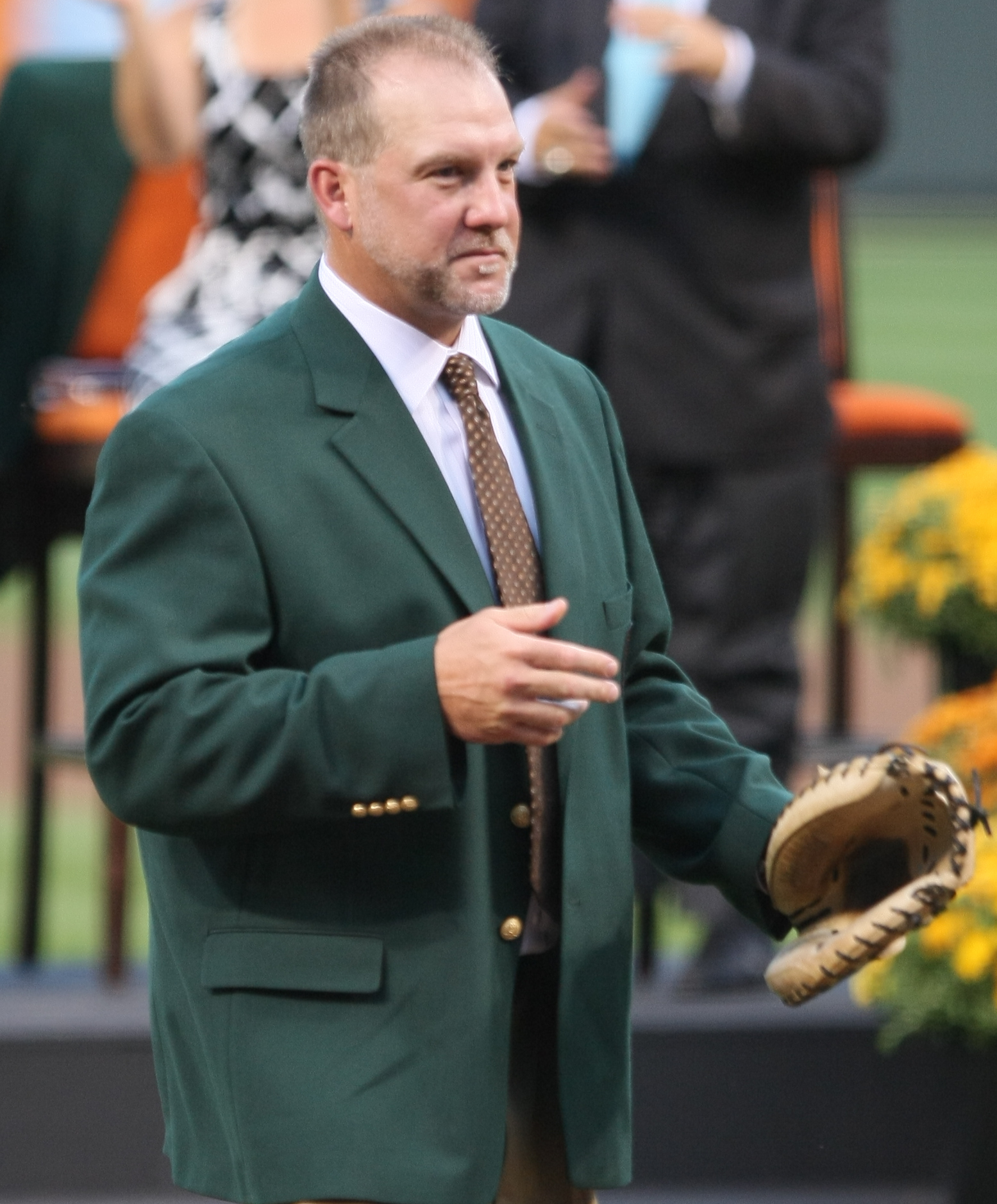
- Hoiles at the induction of Harold Baines into the Orioles Hall of Fame in 2009
- Catcher
- Born: March 20, 1965 (age 61); Bowling Green, Ohio, U.S.
- Batted: Right Threw: Right

MLB debut
- April 25, 1989, for the Baltimore Orioles

Last MLB appearance
- September 27, 1998, for the Baltimore Orioles

MLB statistics
- Batting average: .262
- Home runs: 151
- Runs batted in: 449
- Stats at Baseball Reference

Teams
- Baltimore Orioles (1989–1998)

Career highlights and awards
- Baltimore Orioles Hall of Fame

Chris Allen Hoiles (born March 20, 1965) is an American former professional baseball player and coach. He played his entire Major League Baseball career as a catcher for the Baltimore Orioles from 1989 to 1998. Although his playing career was shortened by injuries, Hoiles was considered one of the best all-around catchers in Major League Baseball, performing well both offensively and defensively. He was inducted into the Baltimore Orioles Hall of Fame in 2006.

== Baseball career ==
Hoiles was drafted by the Detroit Tigers in the 19th round of the 1986 Major League Baseball draft. He played in the Tigers' minor league system until 1988, when he was traded with Cesar Mejia and Robinson Garces to the Baltimore Orioles for Fred Lynn. Hoiles made his major league debut with the Orioles on April 25, 1989, at the age of 24, but appeared in only six games with the Orioles, as he spent most of the season in the minor leagues with the Rochester Red Wings. He appeared in 23 games with the Orioles in 1990, but once again spent most of the season playing in Rochester.

Hoiles returned to the major leagues in 1991 when the Orioles traded away catcher Mickey Tettleton and gave Hoiles an opportunity to be their starting catcher. He made only one error in 89 games played as a catcher and ended the year with a league-leading .998 fielding percentage, becoming the fifth rookie catcher in major league baseball history to win a fielding title.

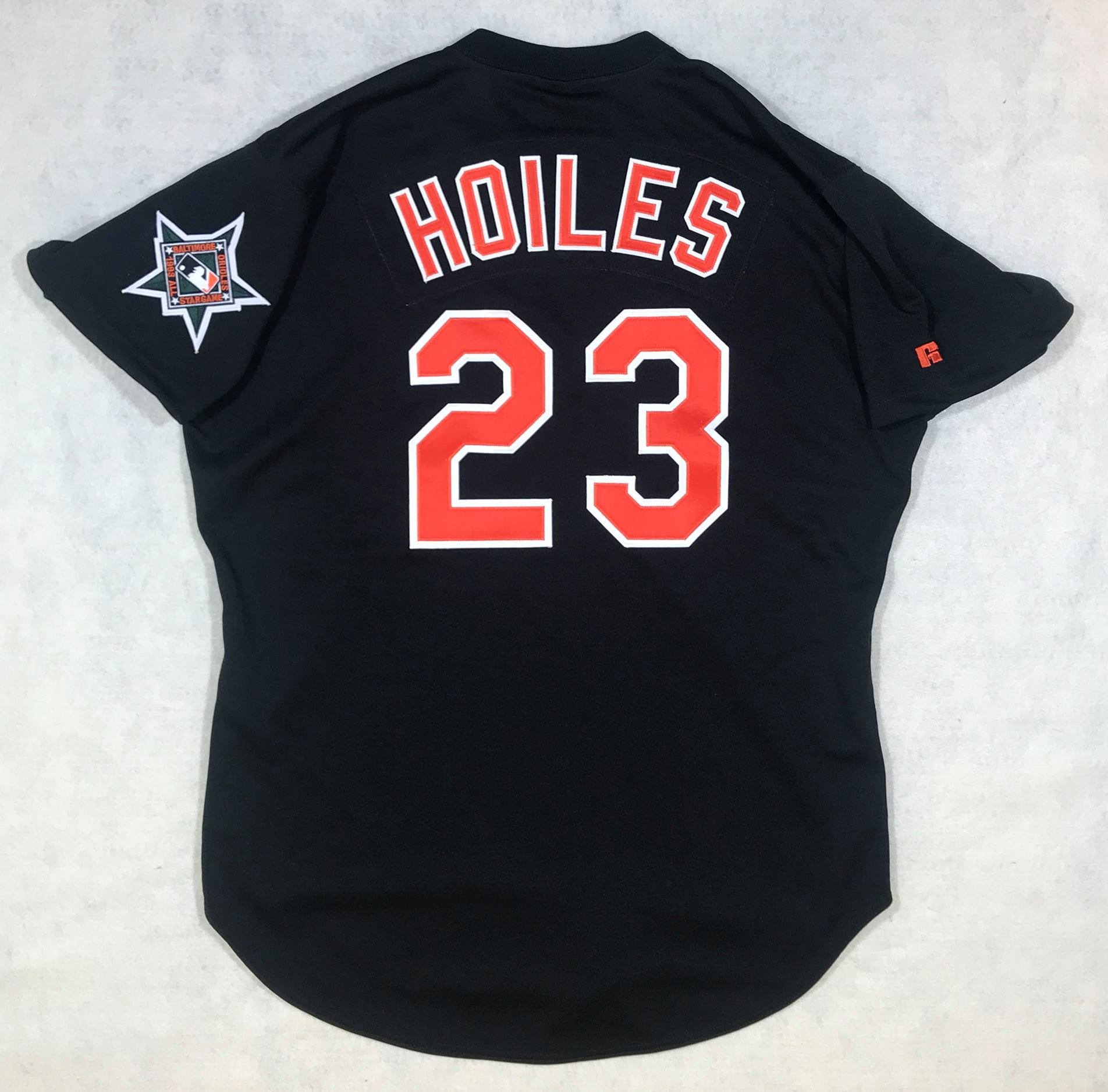
1993 Baltimore Orioles #23 Chris Hoiles alternate jersey

Hoiles had his best season offensively in 1993, hitting for a .300 batting average at mid-season. Cito Gaston, the American League manager for the 1993 All-Star Game held in Baltimore, received criticism for naming Oakland catcher Terry Steinbach as a reserve player instead of hometown favorite Hoiles. Both players were hitting .300, but Hoiles had 18 home runs compared to Steinbach's seven. Gaston explained that he was forced by Major League Baseball rules to name at least one Oakland player to the All-Star team. Hoiles finished the season with a .310 batting average along with 29 home runs, 80 runs batted in, a .416 on-base percentage and a .585 slugging percentage. He ranked fifth in the American League in slugging percentage and in on-base percentage, and finished in 16th place in balloting for the 1993 American League Most Valuable Player Award.

By early 1996, Hoiles' offensive production had diminished to the point to where the Orioles tried to drop him from the team by exposing him through waivers, but he managed a comeback. On May 17, 1996, Hoiles joined the list of 23 major league players who have hit an ultimate grand slam when he hit a grand slam in the bottom of the ninth inning with the Orioles down by three runs against the Seattle Mariners. Hoiles' feat was rare, in that he hit his home run on a full count with two outs, only the second time in major league history this has ever been recorded (the first was by Alan Trammell in 1988). Hoiles ended the 1996 season with 25 home runs and 73 runs batted in to help the Orioles finish in second place in the American League East Division and capture the wild card berth, the Orioles' first postseason berth since winning the 1983 World Series. The Orioles went on to defeat the Cleveland Indians in the first round of the playoffs, before losing to the eventual world champion New York Yankees in the 1996 American League Championship Series.

In 1997, Hoiles played the entire season without committing an error, leading American League catchers with a 1.000 fielding percentage, as the Orioles went on to win the American League East Division title. The Orioles defeated the Seattle Mariners in the first round of the playoffs, before losing to the Cleveland Indians in the 1997 American League Championship Series.

On August 14, 1998, at Jacobs Field in Cleveland, Hoiles became the ninth player and the first catcher in major league history to hit two grand slams in one game. He played in his final major league game on September 27, 1998 at the age of 33. By the beginning of 1999, the 34-year-old Hoiles was hampered by injuries that included a degenerative hip and a bad back. On May 1, 1999, the Orioles announced that Hoiles had been placed on waivers, but had been offered another job within their organization.

== Career statistics ==
In a ten-year major league career, Hoiles played in 894 games, accumulating 739 hits in 2,820 at-bats for a .262 career batting average along with 151 home runs, 449 runs batted in and an on-base percentage of .366. He led American League catchers four times in fielding percentage and ended his career with a .994 average, which was .004 above the league average during his playing career. His .994 career fielding percentage ranks ninth all-time among Major League catchers. Hoiles' career .837 on-base plus slugging percentage is seventh-highest all time among major league catchers. His .467 slugging percentage is 11th highest all-time among major league catchers. His 151 career home runs rank 12th highest in Orioles team history.

Hoiles was the Orioles' catcher on July 13, 1991, when four Orioles pitchers combined to pitch a no-hitter. In a game against the Kansas City Royals on April 9, 1998, Hoiles set a major league record for catchers by being involved in four double plays in one game.

== Post-baseball career ==
After his playing career, Hoiles returned to his alma mater, Eastern Michigan University, where he served as a baseball coach. He later became a baseball coach at Bowling Green State University. He was inducted to the Eastern Michigan University Athletics Hall of Fame in 2000. Hoiles was inducted into the Baltimore Orioles Hall of Fame on August 26, 2006.

On December 20, 2006, Hoiles was named as the first manager of the York Revolution of the independent Atlantic League of Professional Baseball. He led the team to the playoffs, after winning the Freedom Division in the second half of the 2008 season. He stepped down as the manager on August 5, 2009, citing personal reasons.

Hoiles briefly owned a NASCAR Busch Series team, Chris Hoiles Motorsports, that ran 1 race with Gus Wasson in the 1998 Stihl 300, starting 17th and finishing 18th. The team returned in 2001 with the No. 96 Chevrolet/Pontiac driven by Wasson, Jeff Oakley, and Tina Gordon but failed to finish in any of its three starts.

In April 2010, along with Adam Gladstone, Hoiles began his professional radio career as co-host of "Bird Talk," a daily baseball show heard on Baltimore's Fox 1370. The show is a baseball-oriented talk show focusing primarily on the Baltimore Orioles and their minor league affiliates.

== See also ==
- List of Major League Baseball players who spent their entire career with one franchise
- List of Major League Baseball single-game grand slam leaders
- List of Major League Baseball ultimate grand slams

Preceded by Frank Thomas	American League Player of the Month; September 1993	Succeeded by Joe Carter
