= Tony Cloninger =

American baseball player and coach (1940–2018)

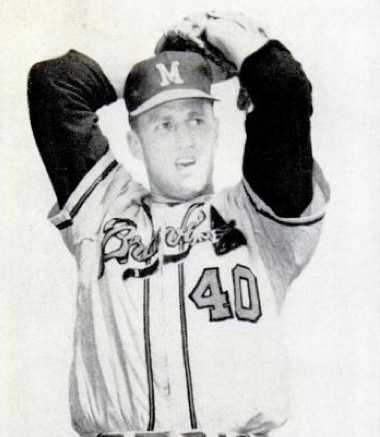
- Cloninger in 1962
- Pitcher
- Born: August 13, 1940; Cherryville, North Carolina, U.S.
- Died: July 24, 2018 (aged 77); Denver, North Carolina, U.S.
- Batted: Right Threw: Right

MLB debut
- June 15, 1961, for the Milwaukee Braves

Last MLB appearance
- July 22, 1972, for the St. Louis Cardinals

MLB statistics
- Win–loss record: 113–97
- Earned run average: 4.07
- Strikeouts: 1,120
- Stats at Baseball Reference

Teams
- As player: Milwaukee / Atlanta Braves (1961–1968); Cincinnati Reds (1968–1971); St. Louis Cardinals (1972); As coach: New York Yankees (1992–2001); Boston Red Sox (2002–2003)

Career highlights and awards
- 4× World Series champion (1996, 1998–2000)

Tony Lee Cloninger (August 13, 1940 – July 24, 2018) was an American professional baseball player and coach. He played in Major League Baseball as a right-handed pitcher from 1961 through 1972 for the Milwaukee / Atlanta Braves, Cincinnati Reds and the St. Louis Cardinals.

== Playing career ==
A power pitcher, Cloninger compiled a career 113–97 record with 1,120 strikeouts and a 4.07 ERA in 1,767 2/3 innings pitched. He enjoyed his best year for the 1965 Braves, with career highs in wins (24), strikeouts (211), ERA (3.29), complete games (16), innings (279) and games started (40).

Regarded as a tough fireball pitcher, Cloninger also was an occasional power hitter. He compiled a career batting average of .192, with 67 RBI and 11 home runs, including five in the 1966 season.

On July 3, 1966, in the Braves' 17–3 win over the Giants at Candlestick Park in San Francisco, Cloninger helped his team's cause with two grand slams and nine RBI, both of which still stand as Braves franchise single-game bests. Cloninger became the first player in the National League, and remains the only pitcher, to hit two grand slams in the same game. Cloninger used a bat of teammate Denis Menke to hit both home runs, and they stood as the only two grand slams of his major league career.

Cloninger finished his career pitching with Cincinnati and St. Louis. He was acquired along with Clay Carroll and Woody Woodward by the Reds from the Atlanta Braves for Milt Pappas, Bob Johnson and Ted Davidson on June 11, 1968.

== Coaching career ==
After retiring, Cloninger served as a bullpen coach for the New York Yankees (1992–2001), where he was a member of five American League champions and four World Series champion teams.

In 2002, he became the pitching coach for the Boston Red Sox, but was forced to step down in early 2003 when he underwent successful treatment for bladder cancer that had been diagnosed in spring training. In 2004, Cloninger became a player development consultant for the Red Sox, serving for almost 15 consecutive seasons until his death.

As Red Sox pitching coach, Cloninger was ejected from a game in 2002 against the Baltimore Orioles. After two batters were hit by pitches, fights broke out and benches cleared. At one point, Cloninger, age 61 at the time, grabbed Orioles' catcher Brook Fordyce in a headlock.

== Death ==
Cloninger died on July 24, 2018, in Denver, North Carolina at the age of 77.

== See also ==
- List of Major League Baseball single-game grand slam leaders
- List of Major League Baseball pitchers who have thrown an immaculate inning
- Baseball record holders

Preceded by Marc Hill	New York Yankees bullpen coach 1992–2001	Succeeded by Tom Nieto
Preceded by Ralph Treuel	Boston Red Sox pitching coach 2002–2003	Succeeded by Dave Wallace
