= Fernando Tatís =

Dominican baseball player (born 1975)

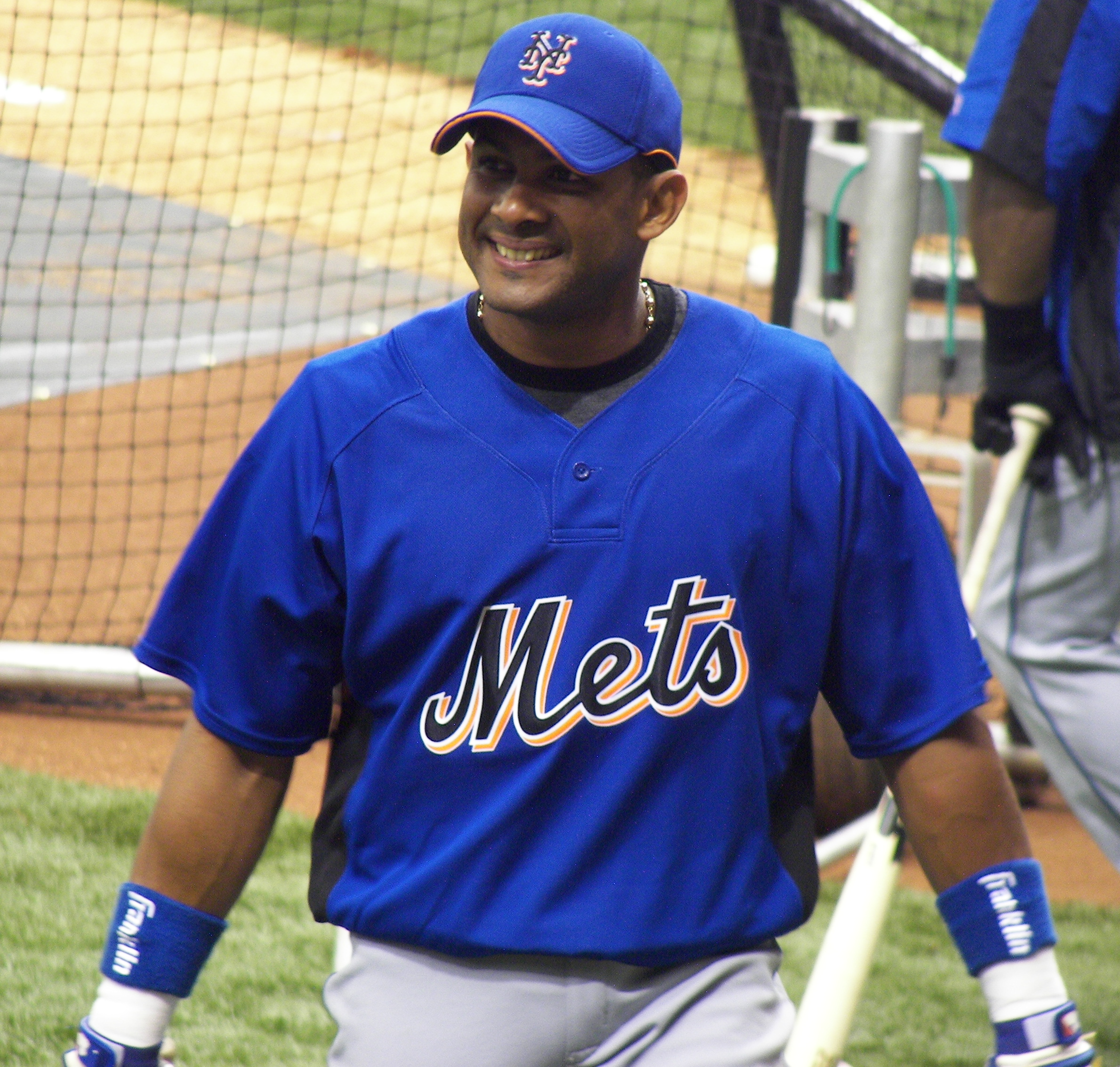
- Tatís with the New York Mets in 2007
- Third baseman
- Born: January 1, 1975 (age 51); San Pedro de Macorís, Dominican Republic
- Batted: Right Threw: Right

MLB debut
- July 26, 1997, for the Texas Rangers

Last MLB appearance
- July 4, 2010, for the New York Mets

MLB statistics
- Batting average: .265
- Home runs: 113
- Runs batted in: 448
- Stats at Baseball Reference

Teams
- Texas Rangers (1997–1998); St. Louis Cardinals (1998–2000); Montreal Expos (2001–2003); Baltimore Orioles (2006); New York Mets (2008–2010)

Career highlights and awards
- Hit two grand slams in one inning; MLB record 8 RBI in one inning

Fernando Gabriel Tatís Medina Sr. (tah-TEES; born January 1, 1975) is a Dominican former professional baseball third baseman. Over his 11-year Major League Baseball (MLB) career, Tatís played for the Texas Rangers, St. Louis Cardinals, Montreal Expos, Baltimore Orioles, and New York Mets. He holds the major league record for runs batted in (RBI) in an inning, with eight, a feat that he achieved by hitting two grand slams in one inning during a game on April 23, 1999, becoming the only player in MLB history to do so. His son, Fernando Jr., plays for the San Diego Padres.

== Playing career ==
At the age of 17, Tatís was signed as an amateur free agent by Omar Minaya and the Texas Rangers on August 25, 1992. Tatís played his first game in Major League Baseball with the Rangers, at third base, almost five years later on July 26, 1997, and went on to play 60 games with the Rangers in his rookie season. At the trade deadline on July 31, 1998, the Rangers traded Tatís along with Darren Oliver and Mark Little to the St. Louis Cardinals for Royce Clayton and Todd Stottlemyre.

Tatís had the best season of his career in 1999 with the St. Louis Cardinals. He hit 34 home runs with 107 RBI and 21 stolen bases, with a .298 batting average. On April 23, 1999, Tatís hit two grand slams in one inning, against starting pitcher Chan Ho Park of the Los Angeles Dodgers. He is the only player in MLB history to accomplish this feat, which also set the MLB record for runs batted in during a single inning (eight).

After playing only 96 games for the Cardinals in 2000 because of an injury, Tatís was traded to the Montreal Expos along with Britt Reames for Dustin Hermanson and Steve Kline. Tatís played just 208 games over three seasons with the Expos because of injuries.

The Tampa Bay Devil Rays invited Tatís to spring training in 2004, but he did not make the team and was released. Tatís next did not play professional baseball for two seasons and resided in the Dominican Republic.

The Baltimore Orioles signed Tatís to a minor-league contract on November 25, 2005. He returned to baseball to raise money to build a church. He played most of the season for the AAA baseball Ottawa Lynx, eventually playing in 28 games for the Orioles after being called up on July 21, 2006.

In 2007, Tatís was invited to spring training with the Los Angeles Dodgers. After being assigned to minor-league baseball camp, Tatís was granted his request to be released from his contract on March 14. Just nine days later, he signed a minor-league contract with the New York Mets, and spent the 2007 season with its AAA affiliate, the New Orleans Zephyrs.

On May 11, 2008, Tatís was called up from the Zephyrs to replace Ángel Pagán. Tatís had started playing outfield in the minor leagues to become a more versatile player.

On May 28, Tatís hit a walk-off double against Justin Miller to defeat the Florida Marlins in the bottom of the 12th inning. This was Tatís's first career walk-off hit. Tatís played most of his time with the Mets in left field and right field because of injuries to usual starters Moisés Alou and Ryan Church.

On September 16, 2008, Tatís separated his shoulder diving for a fly ball in a game against the Washington Nationals. The Mets team physician diagnosed the injury as a Grade III separation, a complete separation of the joint from the socket. Due to this, Tatís missed the rest of the 2008 regular season. Despite missing the end of the season, on October 23, 2008, Tatís received the Sporting News Comeback Player of the Year Award for the National League.

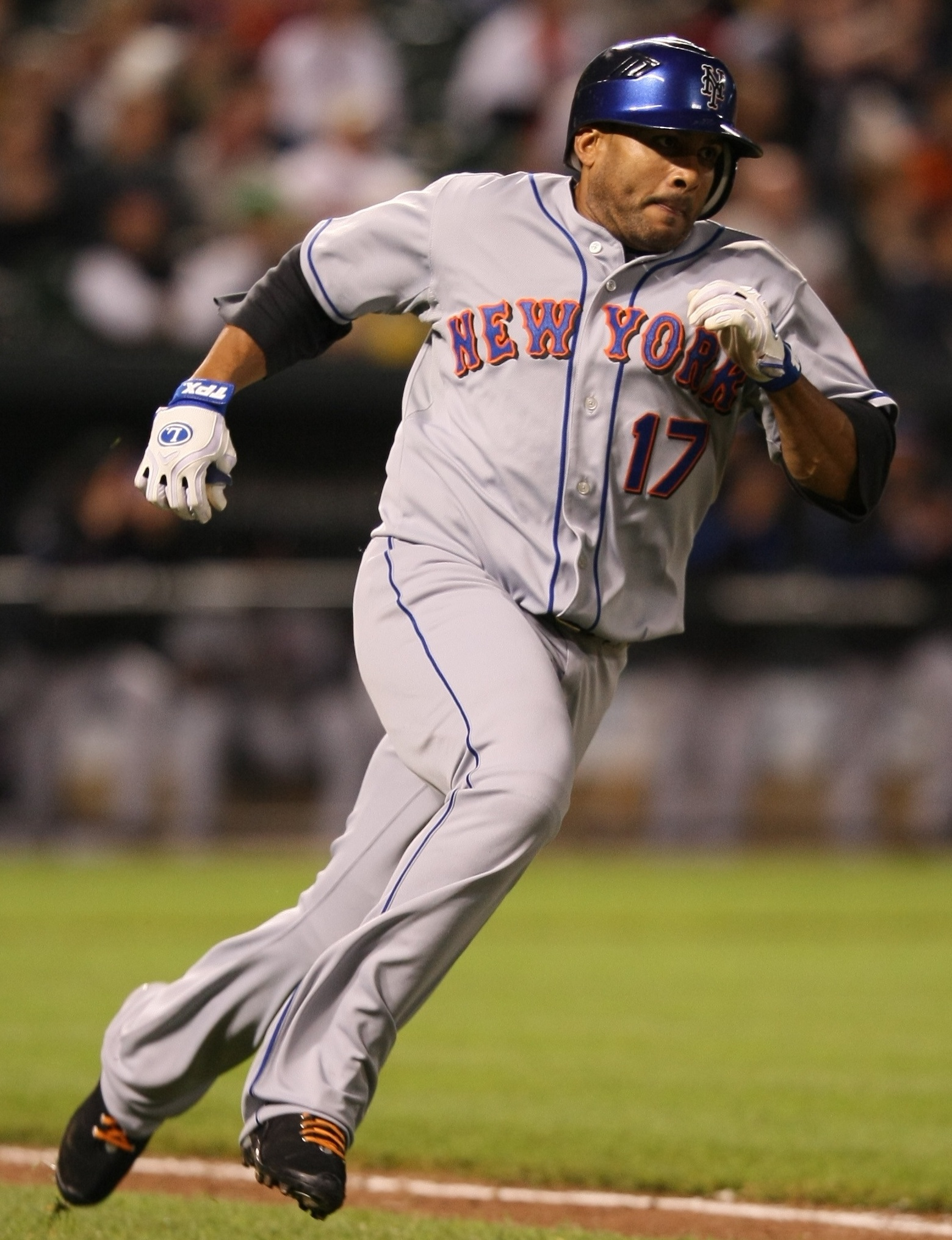
Tatís with the New York Mets in 2009

Tatís was named to the Dominican Republic national baseball team for the 2009 World Baseball Classic as a replacement for Alex Rodriguez, who was injured.

Tatís played intermittently for the Mets in 2009 and 2010. His last Major League game was on July 4, 2010. He was also the latest New York Met to wear uniform number 17, which was taken out of circulation as a mark of respect for Keith Hernandez, who wore it for the Mets from 1983 to 1989.

On April 1, 2014, Tatís signed with the Vaqueros Laguna of the Mexican League. He was released on May 1. In 23 games he hit .241/.348/.367 with 2 home runs and 10 RBIs.

On October 5, 2014, Tatís announced his retirement as a player. For his career, he batted .265 with 113 home runs and 448 RBI.

== Post-playing career ==
On January 9, 2018, the Boston Red Sox announced that Tatís had joined their minor league organization as manager of one of their two rookie-level Dominican Summer League Red Sox teams. He returned for the 2019 season, but was no longer with the organization entering the 2020 season.

On November 26, 2025, Tatis was hired to serve as the manager for the Algodoneros de Unión Laguna of the Mexican League. On June 26, 2026, he was dismissed following a 26–34 start that left the team in seventh place in the North Zone.

== Personal life ==
Tatís' father, Fernando Antonio Tatís, was also a professional baseball player. He was an infielder in the Houston Astros system from 1969 through 1978, reaching as high as Class AAA before retiring and moving on to coaching and scouting Houston's minor leaguers. The elder Fernando disappeared from Tatís' life when he was four years old. The two were not reunited until 1997 when the younger Tatís was a rookie with the Texas Rangers. Rangers scout Omar Minaya, whom Tatís described as a father figure, related the story of Tatís' search for his father to The New York Times national baseball writer Murray Chass. Chass wrote about the search and that article led to the reunion of Tatís and his father. His mother is Yudelca Tatís.

Tatís' older son Fernando Tatís Jr. is a shortstop and outfielder for the San Diego Padres. His younger son, Elijah, is a middle infielder who played in the Chicago White Sox farm system from 2019–22.

== See also ==
- List of Major League Baseball players from the Dominican Republic
- List of Major League Baseball single-game grand slam leaders
- List of Major League Baseball single-inning home run leaders
- List of Major League Baseball single-inning runs batted in leaders
- New York Mets award winners and league leaders
