= Bill Mueller =

American baseball player and coach (born 1971)

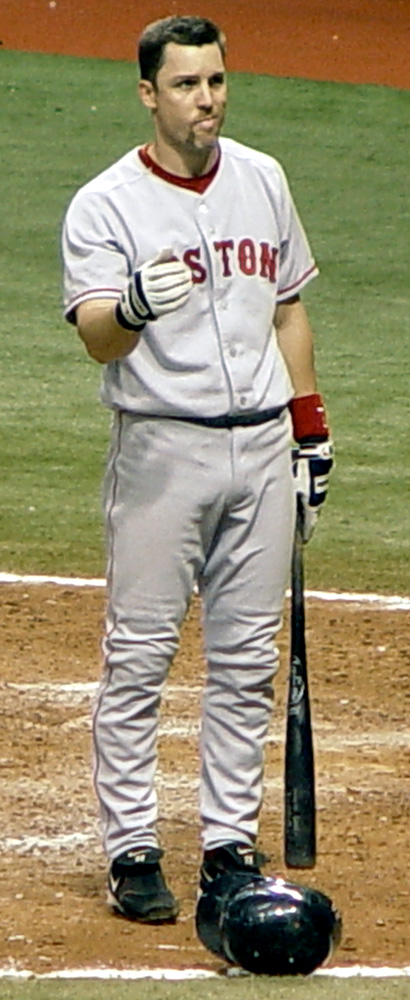
- Mueller with the Boston Red Sox in 2005
- Third baseman
- Born: March 17, 1971 (age 55); Maryland Heights, Missouri, U.S.
- Batted: Switch Threw: Right

MLB debut
- April 18, 1996, for the San Francisco Giants

Last MLB appearance
- May 11, 2006, for the Los Angeles Dodgers

MLB statistics
- Batting average: .291
- Home runs: 85
- Runs batted in: 493
- Stats at Baseball Reference

Teams
- As player: San Francisco Giants (1996–2000); Chicago Cubs (2001–2002); San Francisco Giants (2002); Boston Red Sox (2003–2005); Los Angeles Dodgers (2006); As coach: Los Angeles Dodgers (2007); Chicago Cubs (2014); St. Louis Cardinals (2015–2018); Washington Nationals (2022–2023); Miami Marlins (2024)

Career highlights and awards
- World Series champion (2004); Silver Slugger Award (2003); AL batting champion (2003)

William Richard Mueller (/ˈmɪlər/ MIL-ler; born March 17, 1971) is an American former professional baseball third baseman who played in Major League Baseball (MLB). Mueller's MLB playing career was spent with the San Francisco Giants (1996–2000, 2002), Chicago Cubs (2001–2002), Boston Red Sox (2003–2005), and Los Angeles Dodgers (2006).

Many of Mueller's accolades came during the 2003 season, when he won the American League batting title and a Silver Slugger Award. A switch hitter, he became the only player in major league history to hit one grand slam from both sides of the plate in the same game on July 29, 2003. Mueller was the starting third baseman for the Red Sox' 2004 World Series championship team that beat the St. Louis Cardinals. Since his playing career, he has served in MLB as a front office assistant and hitting coach.

== Playing career ==
Mueller was born in Maryland Heights, Missouri, and attended De Smet Jesuit High School. He attended Southwest Missouri State University, was a four-year starter for the Bears baseball team, and in 2004 inducted into the school's athletics hall of fame. He was named the MVC Player of the Year in 1993, and inducted into their hall of fame in 2020.

In 1992, Mueller played collegiate summer baseball in the Cape Cod Baseball League for the Bourne Braves and was named a league all-star. He was drafted by the San Francisco Giants in the 15th round of the 1993 MLB draft.

Mueller made his professional debut with the Giants low A team, the Everett Giants, in 1993 and quickly rose through the Giants farm system, with stops in San Jose, Shreveport, and Phoenix before making his major league debut with the Giants as a pinch hitter on April 18, 1996, against the Chicago Cubs. He got his first career hit the following day, also as a pinch hitter, against Terry Adams.

Mueller played third base for the Giants fairly regularly for five seasons, until he was traded to the Chicago Cubs before the 2001 season for pitcher Tim Worrell. (Given that Mueller had by then settled into the Bay Area year-round, the Giants, out of respect for Mueller, delayed the trade several days so that Mueller could attend the Cal-Stanford football game one last time as a local star.) He returned to San Francisco in September 2002 in a trade for minor league pitcher Jeff Verplancke. Before the 2003 season, Mueller was signed by the Boston Red Sox as a free agent. In his first year in Boston, he won the American League batting title with a .326 average. He also set career highs with 45 doubles and 19 home runs. Before 2003, he had never hit more than 10 home runs or 29 doubles in any season.

He contributed nearly half of his career home runs during his three years with the Red Sox. Mueller developed a reputation for consistency throughout the major leagues. For five of his ten years in the major leagues, his batting average was between .290 and .295. His minor league numbers were very much the same, consistently between .290 and .310.

Mueller joined the Los Angeles Dodgers for the 2006 season and was reunited with former Boston teammate Nomar Garciaparra, but played only 32 games before undergoing his third knee surgery, which would prove to be career-ending. Doctors ruled out all known procedures to repair the deteriorating condition in his right knee.

In 1,216 games over 11 seasons, Mueller posted a .291 batting average (1229-for-4223) with 663 runs, 265 doubles, 22 triples, 85 home runs, 493 RBI, 543 bases on balls, .373 on-base percentage and .425 slugging percentage. He finished his career with a .958 fielding percentage playing at third and second base. In 36 postseason games, he hit .234 (34-for-145) with 14 runs, eight doubles, one home run, four RBI and 13 walks.

== Coaching career ==
On November 17, 2006, the Dodgers announced that Mueller was retiring as a baseball player, and had been hired as a special assistant to the general manager.

On June 15, 2007, Mueller was named Los Angeles Dodgers interim hitting coach when Eddie Murray was fired. After a month on the job, manager Grady Little announced that the Dodgers would be removing the "interim" tag and that Mueller would remain the teams's hitting coach through the end of the season.

After the season, it was announced that Mueller would be giving up his role as hitting coach to return to a front office position.

Mueller served as a special assistant to General Manager Ned Colletti through the 2012 season, when he left that position to become a full-time scout.

On November 22, 2013, Mueller was named hitting coach of the Chicago Cubs under new manager Rick Renteria. On October 7, 2014, he subsequently resigned that position, a week after his assistant, Mike Brumley, was dismissed by the Cubs.

On November 17, 2014, Cardinals GM John Mozeliak announced "We have an upcoming deal with Billy Mueller." on the hiring of a Cardinals new assistant hitting coach.

Mueller was named the first-base coach after third-base coach Jose Oquendo was placed on medical leave of absence on March 27, 2016. After being named assistant hitting coach for the 2017 season, he missed part of the first half after taking a personal leave of absence, but returned on June 27. Mueller was fired by the Cardinals along with manager Mike Matheny on July 14, 2018.

On January 17, 2022, Mueller was hired by the Washington Nationals as part of the team's player development staff.

On January 19, 2024, Mueller was hired as the assistant hitting coach for the Miami Marlins. On October 2, 2024, Mueller was fired alongside the entirety of the Marlins coaching staff.

== Personal life ==
Mueller became an evangelical Christian in 2000.

== Highlights ==
- Was the American League batting champion in 2003 with a batting average of .326, mostly batting eighth.
- Won the American League Silver Slugger Award for third basemen in 2003.
- On July 29, 2003, visiting the Texas Rangers, he hit three home runs in one game, two of which were grand slams. Mueller became the twelfth player in major league history to hit two grand slams in a single game, but the first ever to hit one from each side of the plate, which has never been repeated. The grand slams also came in consecutive at-bats.
- Hit a dramatic game-winning walk-off home run on July 24, 2004, against the New York Yankees. The game had been a seesaw battle featuring a bench-clearing brawl in which Boston catcher Jason Varitek and Yankees third baseman Alex Rodriguez famously clashed after Bronson Arroyo hit Rodríguez with a curveball. The game appeared to be another devastating loss for the then stagnant Red Sox, but in the bottom of the ninth, with the Red Sox down a run and Yankees closer Mariano Rivera on the mound, Mueller hit a 3–1 pitch into the Red Sox bullpen in right field, winning the game for the Red Sox. Many baseball analysts considered this game to be the turning point in the Red Sox 2004 season, in which they went on to win the World Series.
- Made a significant number of contributions to the Red Sox's World Series win in 2004. The most notable was his critical RBI single in the ninth inning of Game 4 against the Yankees in the American League Championship Series. Down 4–3 in the ninth inning and facing elimination, Kevin Millar drew a walk from closer Mariano Rivera. Dave Roberts came in to pinch run for Millar and stole second base. Mueller singled him home and the Red Sox went on to win in 12 innings, beginning their run of eight straight wins, culminating in the title.
- With his former team, the Boston Red Sox, down three games to two in the 2007 American League Championship Series, Bill Mueller was brought in to throw out the ceremonial first pitch of game six to bring back a little of the magic that his hit against the Yankees in 2004 had brought. The Red Sox went on to win the game 12–2, the ALCS 4–3, and the World Series.
- Held a .455 career batting average against Mariano Rivera. Was nicknamed "The Rivera Slayer".

== See also ==
- List of Major League Baseball batting champions
- List of Major League Baseball single-game grand slam leaders
- List of St. Louis Cardinals coaches

Preceded by Eddie Murray	Los Angeles Dodgers hitting coach 2007	Succeeded by Mike Easler
Preceded by James Rowson	Chicago Cubs hitting coach 2014	Succeeded by John Mallee
