= Chan Ho Park =

South Korean baseball player (born 1973)

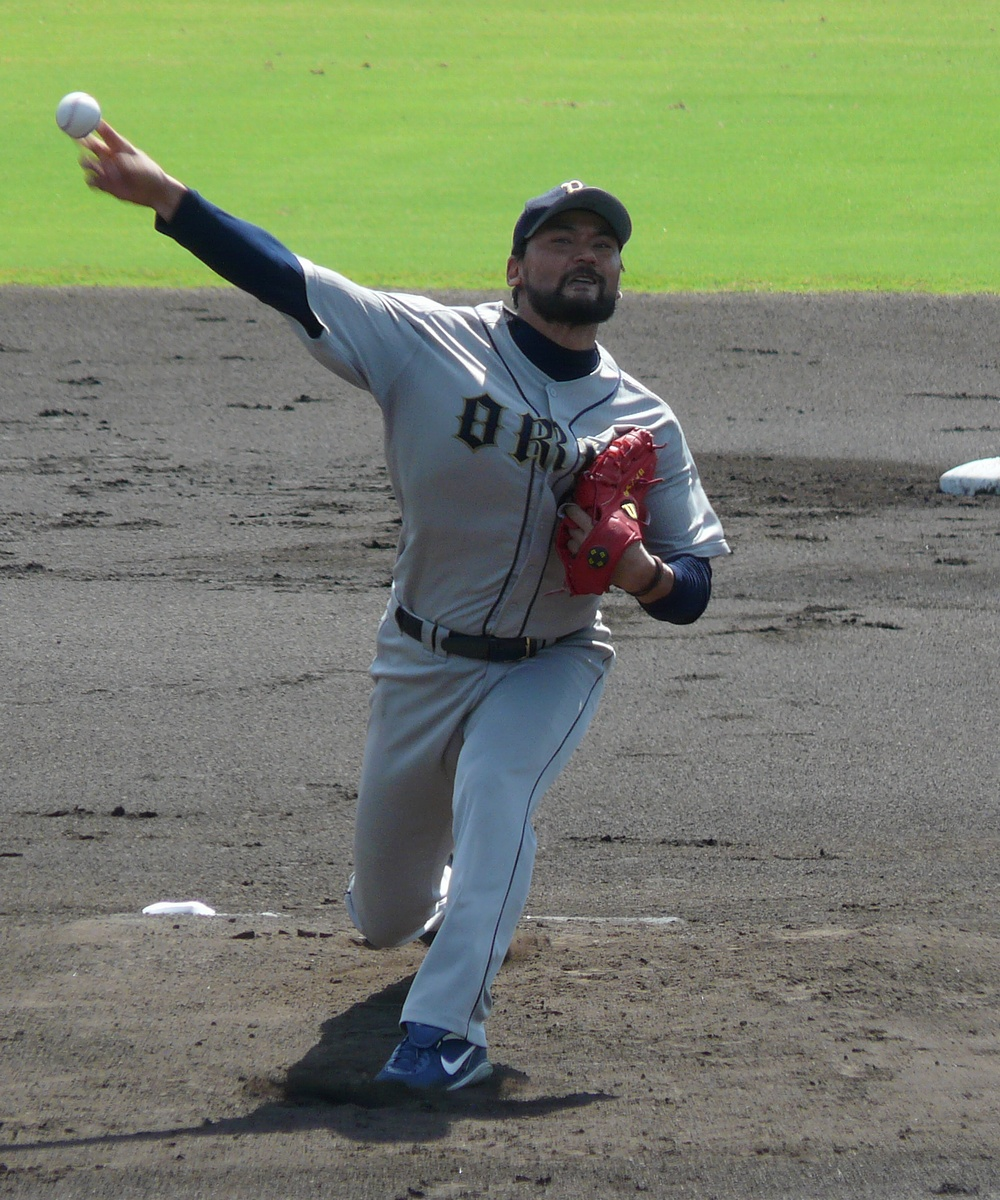
- Park with the Orix Buffaloes in 2011
- Pitcher
- Born: June 30, 1973 (age 53); Gongju, South Korea
- Batted: Right Threw: Right

Professional debut
- MLB: April 8, 1994, for the Los Angeles Dodgers
- NPB: April 15, 2011, for the Orix Buffaloes
- KBO: April 12, 2012, for the Hanwha Eagles

Last appearance
- MLB: October 1, 2010, for the Pittsburgh Pirates
- NPB: May 29, 2011, for the Orix Buffaloes
- KBO: October 3, 2012, for the Hanwha Eagles

MLB statistics
- Win–loss record: 124–98
- Earned run average: 4.36
- Strikeouts: 1,715

NPB statistics
- Win–loss record: 1–5
- Earned run average: 4.29
- Strikeouts: 21

KBO statistics
- Win–loss record: 5–10
- Earned run average: 5.06
- Strikeouts: 68
- Stats at Baseball Reference

Teams
- Los Angeles Dodgers (1994–2001); Texas Rangers (2002–2005); San Diego Padres (2005–2006); New York Mets (2007); Los Angeles Dodgers (2008); Philadelphia Phillies (2009); New York Yankees (2010); Pittsburgh Pirates (2010); Orix Buffaloes (2011); Hanwha Eagles (2012)

Career highlights and awards
- All-Star (2001)
Medals
Men's baseball
Representing South Korea
Asian Baseball Championship
Silver medal – second place	2007 Taichung	Team
Asian Games
Gold medal – first place	1998 Bangkok	Team

- Chan Ho Park
- Hangul: 박찬호
- Hanja: 朴贊浩
- RR: Bak Chanho
- MR: Pak Ch'anho
- IPA: [pɐk̚.tɕʰɐn.ɦo]

Chan Ho Park (Korean: 박찬호; born June 30, 1973) is a South Korean former professional baseball pitcher. Park was the first South Korean-born player in MLB history, and the first South Korean player to be named an MLB All-Star. He played for the Los Angeles Dodgers, Texas Rangers, San Diego Padres, New York Mets, Philadelphia Phillies, New York Yankees, and Pittsburgh Pirates of Major League Baseball (MLB), the Orix Buffaloes of Nippon Professional Baseball (NPB), and the Hanwha Eagles of the KBO League. As of 2026, he has the most career wins of any Asia-born pitcher in history (124), having passed Hideo Nomo for that distinction in 2010. During his playing days, Park stood 6 feet 2 inches (188 cm) tall, weighing 210 pounds (95 kg).

== Early life and career in South Korea ==
Chan Ho Park was born in Gongju, South Korea, on June 30, 1973. As a high school player in South Korea, he won team Most Valuable Player honors three consecutive seasons at Gongju High School in Gongju, South Korea. He also was named the MVP at four national prep tournaments.

Park was a member of the 1992 and 1993 South Korea national baseball team. He posted a 2.76 ERA in helping South Korea earn the silver medal at the Asian Baseball Championship in 1993. He also competed in 1993 Summer Universiade, and led his team to the silver medal.

Park was a sophomore at Hanyang University, Seoul in 1994 when he was signed by the Los Angeles Dodgers as an amateur free agent.

In 2015, he and Yang Hak-seon lit the cauldron for the 2015 Summer Universiade held in Gwangju, South Korea.

In 1993, Park Chan-ho attended Hanyang University in Seoul, and in the same year at the Asian Cup held in Perth, Australia, Chinese team hitters Chen Qingguo and Tong Qinghui hit a home run from him. In 1994, the Los Angeles Dodgers snagged Park Chan-ho. He began pitching in 1996 and won his first major league win on April 6.

== Professional career ==
=== 1994–2001: Los Angeles Dodgers ===
Park made his professional debut for the Dodgers on April 8, 1994, against the Atlanta Braves as a reliever, working one inning (a game in which the Dodgers were no-hit by the Braves' Kent Mercker).

Park played in one additional game for the Dodgers that season and then spent the bulk of the season with the Class AA San Antonio Missions, finishing with a 5–7 record and a 3.55 ERA for the Missions in 20 starts with 100 strikeouts.

With the Albuquerque Dukes in 1995 he was fourth in the Pacific Coast League in strikeouts with 101, and averaged 8.26 strikeouts per 9 innings, the top mark among all Class AAA pitchers. He was selected by Baseball America as the 2nd best Dodgers prospect after the season with the best fastball in the PCL. He recorded his first Major League start on October 1 against the San Diego Padres after receiving a September call-up.

In 1996, his first full season with the Dodgers, he went 5–5 with a 3.64 ERA in 48 games (10 starts). He recorded his first win on April 6 against the Chicago Cubs.

Park had a breakout season in 1997 as he became a full-time starter. He tied for the team lead in victories, while posting a 14–8 record and a 3.38 ERA in 32 appearances, 29 of them starts.

In 1998, he was 15–9 with a 3.71 ERA in 34 starts and struck out 191 batters in 220.2 innings. After the season, he led the South Korean national team to the gold medal in the Asian Games, beating Japan in the final match.

In 1999, he struggled in the rotation with 13–11 with a 5.23 ERA. On April 23, 1999, he became the only pitcher in the history of baseball to allow two grand slams in the same inning and to the same player, Fernando Tatís of the St. Louis Cardinals. It is considered one of the most unbreakable records in the history of baseball. There are two more pitchers in the history of baseball who allowed two grand slams in the same game — Jack Morris, and more recently, Brandon Backe — but to different hitters in different innings. He also walked 100 batters in only 194 innings. On June 5, 1999, Park was involved in an on-field brawl at Dodger Stadium with Anaheim Angels pitcher Tim Belcher. Park attacked Belcher after being tagged out after a bunt play. Park said that Belcher had tagged him too hard on the just-concluded play and asked him about the incident. According to Park, Belcher replied with racist comments causing Park to kick him.

In 2000, he ranked second in strikeouts with 217, second in opposing batting average (.214), and lowest in allowed hits per nine innings. despite second in allowing bases on balls (124) in the National League. He finished the season 18–10 with a 3.27 ERA, the best totals of his entire career. He also tossed his first career complete game shutout on September 29, against the San Diego Padres. Park was also named the Dodgers opening day starter for the 2001 season and tossed the Dodgers first season opening shutout since 1981. He was 15–11 with a 3.50 ERA during the season and was selected to appear in the 2001 Major League Baseball All-Star Game, where he pitched one inning, allowed a home run to Cal Ripken Jr. and was charged with the loss. Park gave up Barry Bonds' record-breaking 71st and 72nd homers on October 5 against the San Francisco Giants.

=== 2002–2005: Texas Rangers ===
Park was granted free agency after the season and was signed by the Texas Rangers in December of that year to a five-year, $65 million contract, which was one of the largest contracts for a pitcher at that time. However, during his time with the Rangers, he was hampered by injuries and a home stadium that favors hitters. In his first season with the Rangers, Park went 9–8 in 25 starts, with a 5.75 ERA. The following season, he only started seven times due to injuries, going 1–3 with a 7.58 ERA.

On July 29, 2005, he was traded by the Rangers to the San Diego Padres in exchange for Phil Nevin. Padres fans had hoped that Park could repeat his previous success by playing in pitcher-friendly Petco Park.

=== 2005–2006: San Diego Padres ===
In the 2005 season, his combined record was 12–8, despite a 5.74 ERA. In the 2006 season, Park was reunited with his former Texas Rangers teammate and friend Chris Young, who was traded to the Padres in exchange for Akinori Otsuka. Park started the season as a reliever but soon he became a starter. On July 31, he suffered from intestinal bleeding and was placed on the disabled list. Several of his teammates, including Jake Peavy, Woody Williams, Chris Young, and Alan Embree, offered to donate their blood, but Park graciously refused their offer, as they were vital members of the team. Park accepted blood transfusions, that came, in part, from Jake Peavy's wife Katie and Kelly Calabrese, the Padres' team massage therapist. However, Park's recovery did not last long as he suffered from another episode of intestinal bleeding on August 21. He was hospitalized again, this time along with his wife Ri-hye, who was about to deliver their first child. A very thorough medical examination revealed that Park was suffering from a congenital defect called Meckel's diverticulum. Park had a successful surgery and only six days later his wife delivered a healthy baby daughter at the same hospital.

The San Diego Padres advanced to the post-season and Park joined the postseason roster. On October 3, 2006, Park made his first career postseason appearance in Game 1 of the National League Division Series against the St. Louis Cardinals as a reliever. He also had career-high season batting average of .268 from 41 at bats.

=== 2007: New York Mets & Houston Astros ===
On February 8, 2007, the Yonhap news agency and New York Daily News reported that Park had signed a one-year, $3 million contract with the New York Mets and would report to the Mets' spring training facility in Port St. Lucie, Florida to compete for a starting rotation spot. The Mets sent him down to Triple-A New Orleans following his poor spring performance. On April 30, 2007, Park was called up from Triple-A New Orleans to start for the injured Orlando Hernández. In that sole game, he gave up 7 earned runs in 4 innings. On May 3, 2007, Park was sent back down to Triple-A New Orleans. He was designated for assignment on June 4, 2007.

On June 12, 2007, he signed a minor league deal with the Houston Astros. Astros Manager Phil Garner said, "Park will have a few starts at Triple-A Round Rock before the Astros decide whether to call him up." Park compiled a 2–10 record over 15 starts with Round Rock, failing to earn a spot on the Astros' 40-man roster.

=== 2008: Return to the Dodgers ===
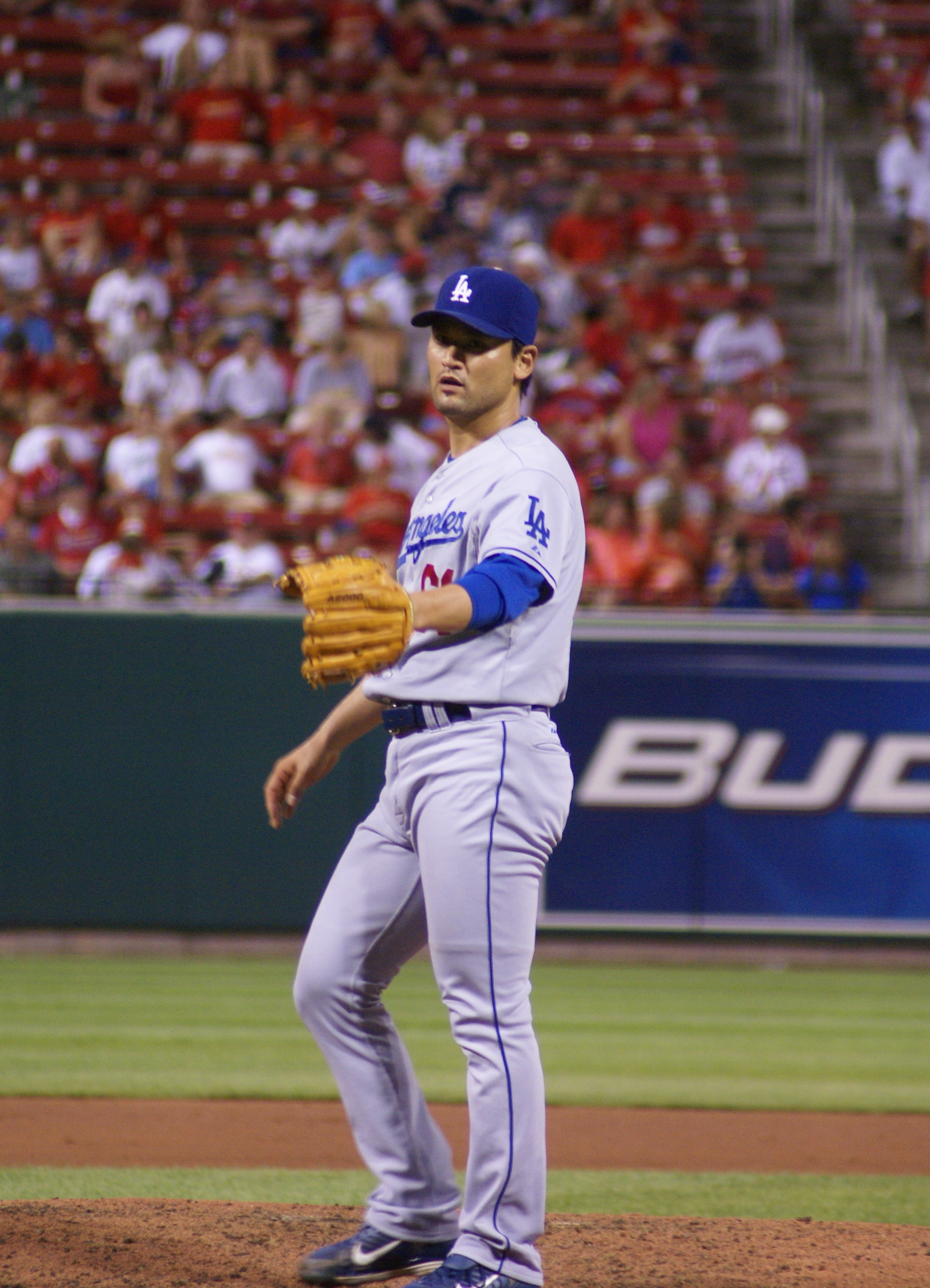
Park with the Dodgers in 2008.

On November 8, 2007, Park accepted an offer from his original team, the Los Angeles Dodgers, to attend spring training as a non-roster invitee. On November 28, 2007, Park asked to be let go by the Dodgers to play for the Korean national team. After pitching with no health issues for the Korean national team, the contract was finalized on December 6, 2007. Despite being considered a long shot for the fifth starter's role, Park pitched very well, but was ultimately passed over for right-hander Esteban Loaiza. He was eventually reassigned to the minor leagues on March 30, 2008. Faced with the problem of a fatigued and depleted pitching staff three games later, the Dodgers purchased Park's minor league contract on April 2, 2008.

On May 17, 2008, Park made his first start as a Dodger since 2001 against the Los Angeles Angels of Anaheim. He allowed two runs (one earned run) in four innings with no decision. This game turned out to be a historic one as for the first time in MLB history, all three Dodgers pitchers who pitched in this game (Park, Hong-Chih Kuo, and Takashi Saito) were of Asian origin. The Dodgers won it 6–3.

On June 21, 2008, Park started against the Cleveland Indians at the Dodger Stadium and joined Kevin Brown, Al Leiter, Javier Vázquez, and Jamie Moyer as the only pitchers to start a game against all 30 Major League teams. In addition to making history, he had a decent outing, with nine strikeouts in five innings pitched, although this was overshadowed when he gave up a solo home run to Cleveland Indians pitcher CC Sabathia.

After Takashi Saito's elbow injury, Park was moved back to the bullpen by manager Joe Torre. Jonathan Broxton was promoted to the closer role and Park and Hong-Chih Kuo to the setup man platoon.

=== 2009: Philadelphia Phillies ===
On January 6, Park signed a one-year, incentive-laden, $2.5 million contract with the Philadelphia Phillies. On March 31, Phillies GM Rubén Amaro Jr. announced that Chan Ho Park had won the fifth starter job. However, with several poor starts (7 starts with a 7.29 ERA), Park was moved to the bullpen and was replaced in the rotation by J. A. Happ. The problem with Park as a starter was that he was sacrificing velocity and movement for the energy to go deeper in games. After moving to the pen, his four-seam fastball velocity returned to normal (topped out at 95-96 mph), with movement on his two-seam fastball and slider. Park played a vital role in the Phillies' bullpen with a 2.52 ERA. After missing time with a hamstring injury, Park made his return to the Phillies in the playoffs. With the Phillies, he advanced to his first World Series, in which he pitched well, giving up no runs in Philadelphia's loss to the New York Yankees. He became a free agent after the season.

In December 2009 it was announced that Chan Ho Park was suing his former Dodger teammate Chad Kreuter in Los Angeles Superior Court, in which he claimed Kreuter breached repayment of a $460,000 promissory note issued in October 2005.

=== 2010: New York Yankees & Pittsburgh Pirates ===
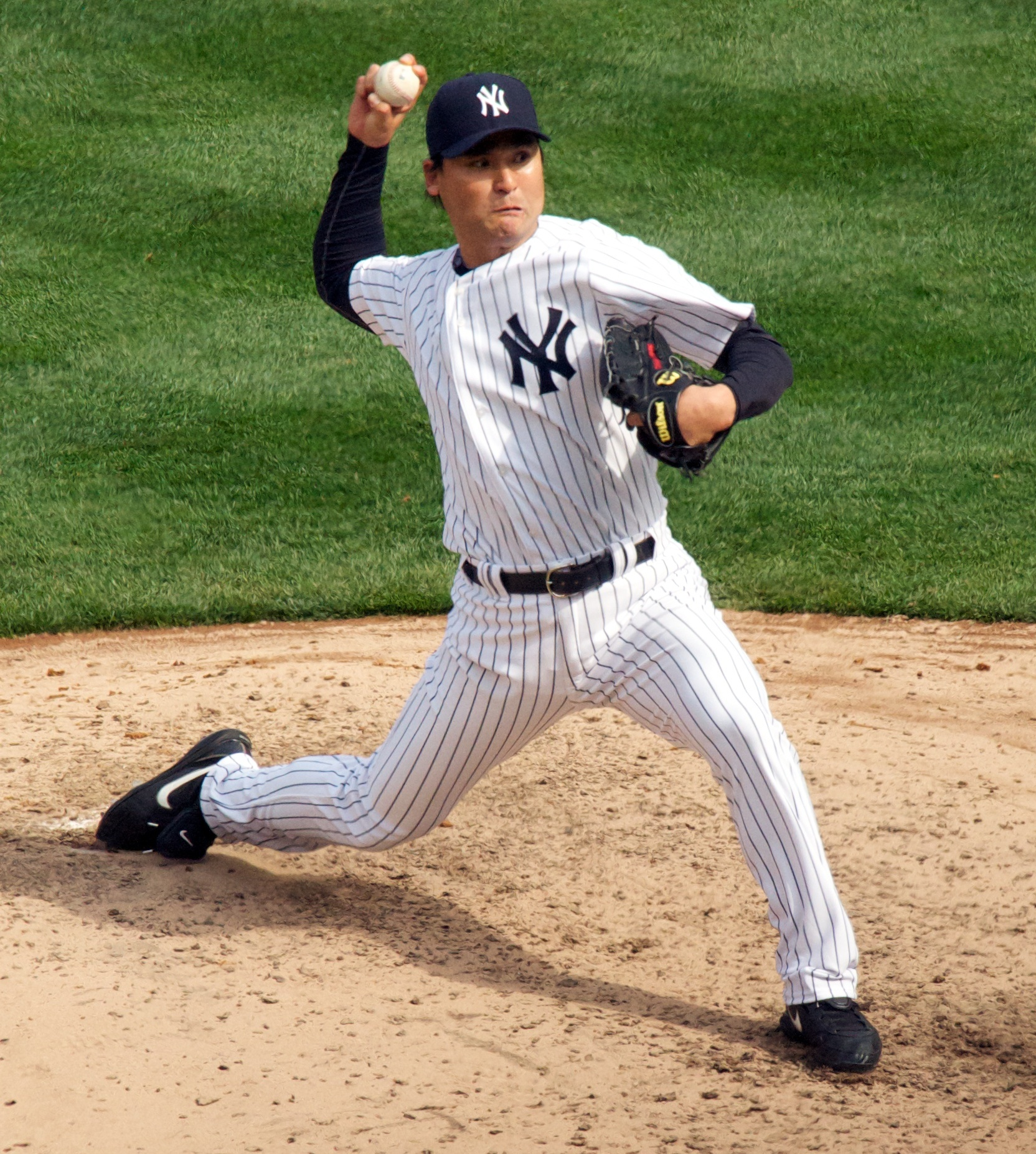
Park with the New York Yankees in 2010

On February 28, 2010, Park signed a one-year contract worth $1.2 million with $300,000 incentives with the New York Yankees. Chan Ho Park decided to play for the Yankees after rejecting an offer of around $3 million per year from the Philadelphia Phillies.

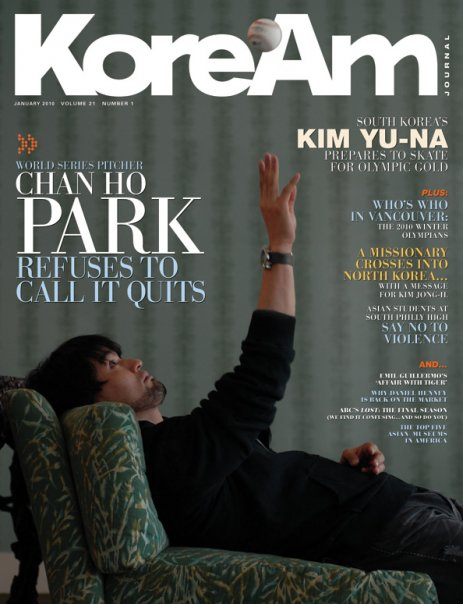
Park on the cover of KoreAm, January 2010

Park got off to a poor start in 2010. In a widely circulated YouTube clip, he blamed his poor performance in one April appearance on a case of diarrhea. After struggling with a 5.60 ERA., Park was designated for assignment on July 31, 2010. On August 4, 2010, Park was claimed off waivers by the Pittsburgh Pirates. On October 1, Park recorded a record for most wins by an Asian-born pitcher in MLB history, tossing three scoreless innings for his 124th career victory. He passed Hideo Nomo for the most ever by an Asian-born pitcher. He became a free agent at the end of the season.

=== 2011: Orix Buffaloes ===
On December 20, 2010, Park signed one-year deal with the Orix Buffaloes of Nippon Professional Baseball for the 2011 season.

=== 2012: Hanwha Eagles ===
On November 24, 2011, Park signed one-year deal with the Hanwha Eagles of the KBO League for the 2012 season.

On December 20, 2011, Park announced that he would guarantee a minimum of $35.5k (₩40 million) of his salary to fund the development of amateur baseball in South Korea. His contract bonus has potential earnings at up to $550,000 (₩600 million) in which Park would donate 100% of this salary to fund efforts to build amateur baseball with youth in the country. Park posted a record of 5–10 with a 5.06 ERA with the Eagles.

He announced his retirement from baseball on November 30, 2012. Park had a record of 124–98 in the Major Leagues with the Dodgers, Rangers, Padres, Mets, Phillies, Yankees, and Pirates.

=== World Baseball Classic ===
Between the 2005 season and the 2006 season, Park represented South Korea in the World Baseball Classic. In the Asia Round games against Taiwan and Japan, Park made appearances as a closing pitcher, shutting out the opposing lineups. He made another appearance as a closer in the semifinal game against Mexico, in which he again shut out his opposing hitters. His performance made San Diego Padres' manager Bruce Bochy believe that Park can be used as an effective reliever as well as a starter. Park later said that Padres' closer Trevor Hoffman taught him how to focus in a relief situation. With his shutout performance in 10 innings and three saves, Korea finished the World Baseball Classic in third place and Park was selected to the WBC All-Star team along with his teammate Lee Seung-yeop and Team Korea's captain Lee Jong-beom.

== Pitching style ==
In his prime, Chan Ho was essentially a power pitcher, his biggest weapon being a four-seam fastball sitting in mid-90s (topped out at 100 mph). Mixed with a two-seam fastball, a slider, a curveball, and a changeup, he had five consecutive seasons of 10+ wins with the Dodgers. Being a power pitcher, however, he often experienced control problems, particularly early in the game. He got many strikeouts, yet also allowed many bases on balls and hit batters that contributed to his lower than average strikeout-walk ratio of less than 2. This prevented him from achieving low ERAs (he only had one top-10 season in ERA and that was his career best in 2000 of 3.27 which was seventh in the NL while playing in pitcher-friendly Dodger Stadium). He was also a flyball-pitcher that benefited a lot from spacious Dodger Stadium outfield; however his style often backfired later when he played for other teams. After several unsuccessful seasons with Rangers, Padres, and Mets, he added a two-seam fastball learned from Orel Hershiser. Fox play-by-play announcer Matt Vasgersian once said about Park's two-seam fastball, "You can only see a two-seamer like that in PlayStation 2." In his career in Philadelphia he also used a cutter and a sinker, learned from Kevin Brown. Park's 2008 comeback season was marked with a return to complete health for the first time in years, allowing him to combine his crafty veteran style with a renewed ability to pitch effective fastballs in low to mid-90s mph.

== Personal life ==
Park married Korean-Japanese socialite Ri-hye Park on November 29, 2005. An ethnic Korean, she grew up in Japan and went to culinary school in New York. She is publicly known as a semi-professional chef, writer and the only daughter of Japan's 76th richest man according to The Philadelphia Inquirer. In spring 2009, Ri-hye released a best-selling cookbook in South Korea whose proceeds went to children's charities on behalf of the Chan Ho Park Dream Foundation. Park and his wife have three daughters.

In 2020, Park made a cameo appearance as himself in two episodes of the Korean television drama Start-Up.

In 2021, Park played in two golf tournaments on the Korean Tour.

== See also ==
- List of Texas Rangers Opening Day starting pitchers
- List of Major League Baseball career hit batsmen leaders
- List of baseball players who went directly to Major League Baseball
- List of Major League Baseball players from South Korea

Preceded by Kevin Brown	Los Angeles Dodgers Opening Day; Starting pitcher 2001	Succeeded by Kevin Brown
Preceded by Kevin Millwood	NL hits per nine innings 2000	Succeeded by Randy Johnson
