= List of Major League Baseball single-game grand slam leaders =

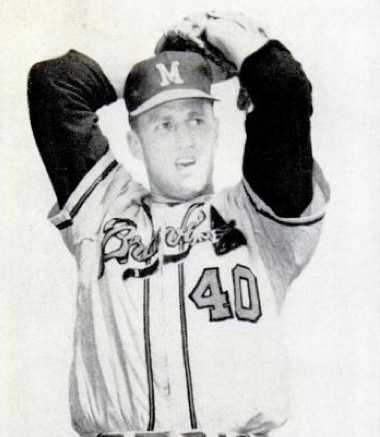
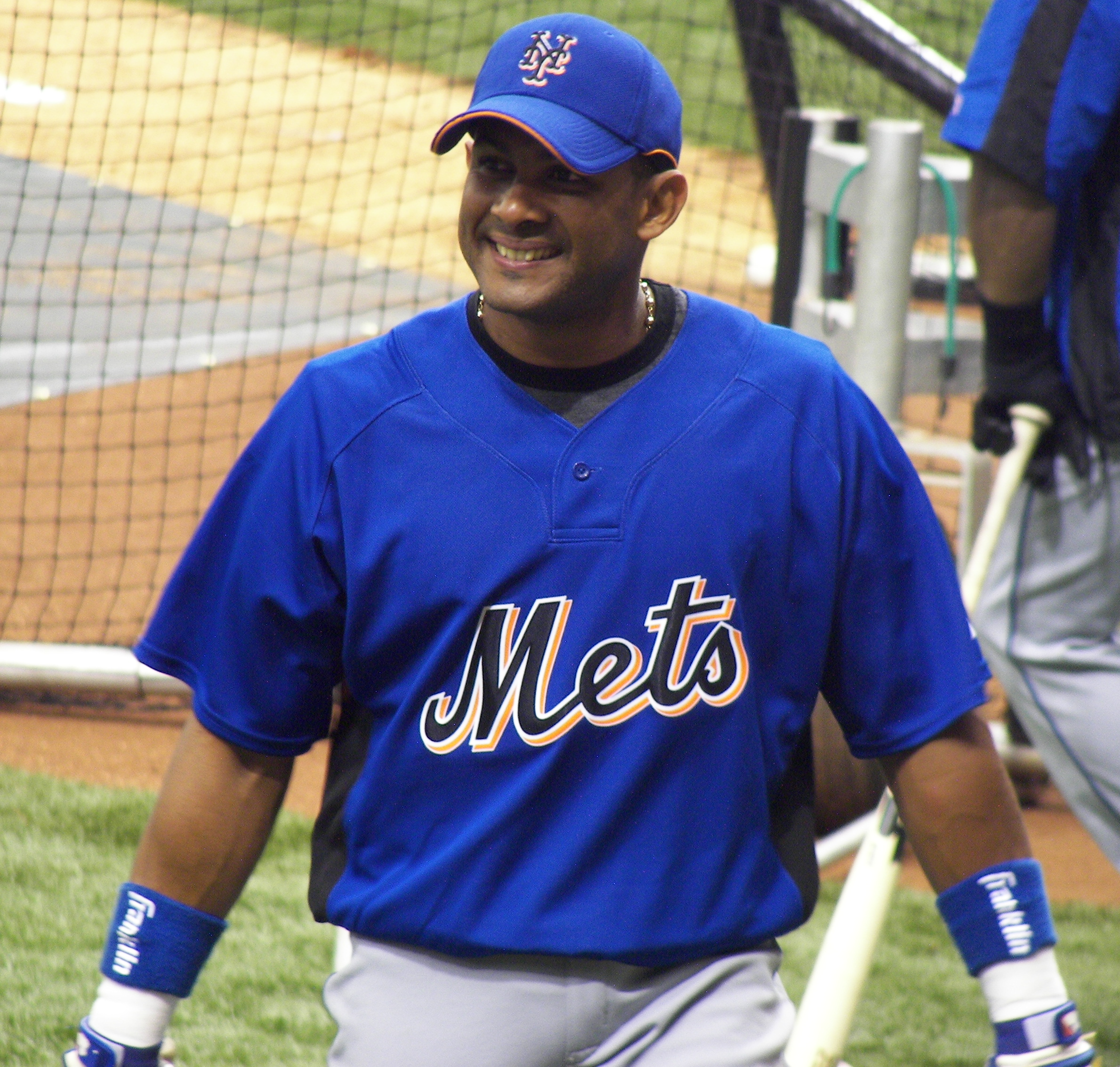
Tony Cloninger (left) is the only pitcher to hit two grand slams in one game, while Fernando Tatís (right) achieved the unprecedented feat of hitting two grand slams in the same inning in 1999.

In baseball, a grand slam is a home run that is hit when the bases are loaded (i.e., there are runners occupying first, second, and third base simultaneously), thereby scoring four runs—the most possible in one play. Thirteen players have hit two grand slams in a single Major League Baseball (MLB) game to date, the most recent being Josh Willingham of the Washington Nationals on July 27, 2009. No player has accomplished the feat more than once in his career and no player has ever hit more than two in a game. Tony Lazzeri was the first player to hit two grand slams in a single game, doing so for the New York Yankees against the Philadelphia Athletics on May 24, 1936.

Every team which had a player hit two grand slams won their milestone games. These games have resulted in other single-game MLB records being set due to the prodigious offensive performance. Lazzeri, for example, proceeded to hit a third home run in the game and finished with a total of eleven runs batted in, an American League record. Fernando Tatís became the only player to hit two grand slams in the same inning, when he attained the milestone, slugging two in the third inning for the St. Louis Cardinals on April 23, 1999. In achieving the feat, he also set a new major league record with eight runs batted in in a single inning.

Tony Cloninger is the only pitcher to have accomplished the feat. Bill Mueller hit his grand slams from both sides of the plate, while Jim Northrup hit his grand slams on consecutive pitches received in the fifth and sixth innings. Nomar Garciaparra is the sole player who achieved the feat at home, doing so at Fenway Park for the Boston Red Sox. Cloninger is the only player who never hit a grand slam before or after his milestone game, while Robin Ventura—with 18 grand slams—hit more than any other player in this group. Frank Robinson is also a member of the 500 home run club.

Of the nine players eligible for the Baseball Hall of Fame who have hit two grand slams in a game, two have been elected, one on the first ballot. Players are eligible for the Hall of Fame if they have played in at least 10 MLB seasons, and have either been retired for five seasons or deceased for at least six months. These requirements leave ineligible one player—Jim Tabor—who did not play in 10 seasons.

== Players ==
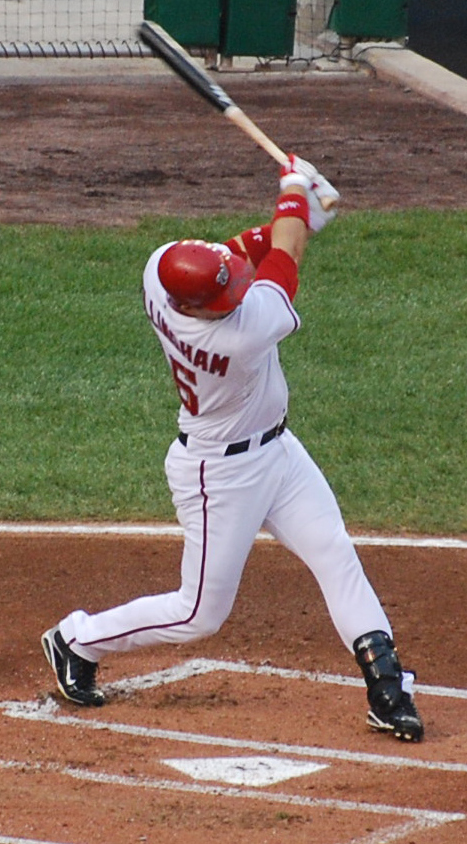
Josh Willingham is the most recent player to hit two grand slams in one game, achieving the feat in 2009.

Key
Player	Name of the player
Date	Date of the two grand slam game
Team	The player's team at the time of the game
Opposing team	The team against whom the player hit two grand slams
Score	Final score of the game, with the player's team score listed first
Career GS	The number of grand slams the player hit in his MLB career
†	Elected to the Baseball Hall of Fame

MLB hitters with two grand slams in one game
#	Player	Date	Team		Opposing team	Score	Career GS	Ref(s)
1	Tony Lazzeri^{†}	May 24, 1936	New York Yankees	@	Philadelphia Athletics	25–2	8	
2	Jim Tabor	July 4, 1939	Boston Red Sox	@	Philadelphia Athletics	18–12	7	
3	Rudy York	July 27, 1946	Boston Red Sox	@	St. Louis Browns	13–6	12	
4	Jim Gentile	May 9, 1961	Baltimore Orioles	@	Minnesota Twins	13–5	6	
5	Tony Cloninger	July 3, 1966	Atlanta Braves	@	San Francisco Giants	17–3	2	
6	Jim Northrup	June 24, 1968	Detroit Tigers	@	Cleveland Indians	14–3	8	
7	Frank Robinson^{†}	June 26, 1970	Baltimore Orioles	@	Washington Senators	12–2	8	
8	Robin Ventura	September 4, 1995	Chicago White Sox	@	Texas Rangers	14–3	18	
9	Chris Hoiles	August 14, 1998	Baltimore Orioles	@	Cleveland Indians	15–3	8	
10	Fernando Tatís	April 23, 1999	St. Louis Cardinals	@	Los Angeles Dodgers	12–5	8	
11	Nomar Garciaparra	May 10, 1999	Boston Red Sox		Seattle Mariners	12–4	7	
12	Bill Mueller	July 29, 2003	Boston Red Sox	@	Texas Rangers	14–7	4	
13	Josh Willingham	July 27, 2009	Washington Nationals	@	Milwaukee Brewers	14–6	6	
