= 1968 Chicago Cubs season =

1968 Chicago Cubs
- League: National League
- Ballpark: Wrigley Field
- City: Chicago
- Record: 84–78 (.519)
- League place: 3rd
- Owners: Philip K. Wrigley
- General managers: John Holland
- Managers: Leo Durocher
- Television: WGN-TV (Jack Brickhouse, Vince Lloyd)
- Radio: WGN (Vince Lloyd, Lou Boudreau)

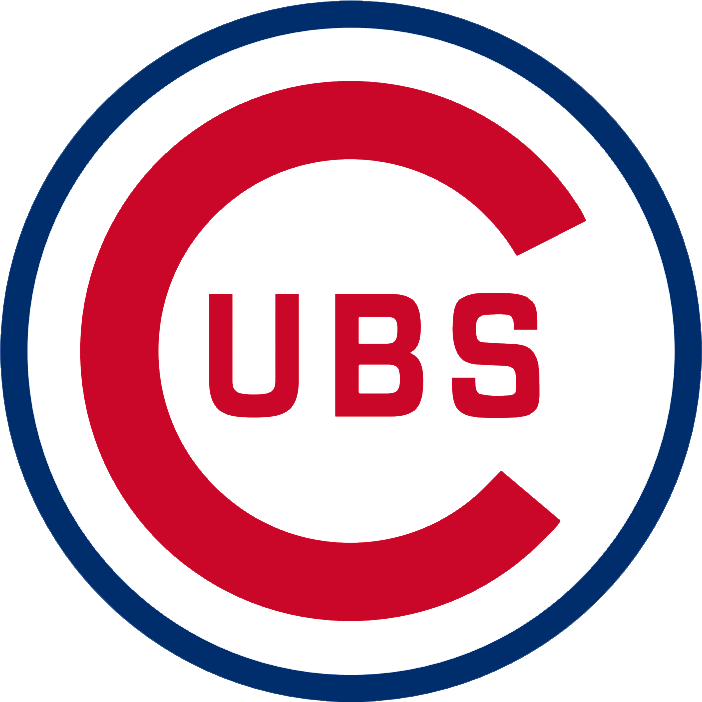
Logo 1957-1978

The 1968 Chicago Cubs season was the 97th season of the Chicago Cubs franchise, the 93rd in the National League and the 53rd at Wrigley Field. The Cubs finished third in the National League with a record of 84–78.

== Offseason ==
- November 28, 1967: Ramón Hernández was drafted by the Cubs from the Atlanta Braves in the 1967 rule 5 draft.
- November 30, 1967: Paul Popovich and Jim Williams were traded by the Cubs to the Los Angeles Dodgers for Lou Johnson.

== Regular season ==
=== Season standings ===
National League
Team	W	L	Pct.	GB	Home	Road
St. Louis Cardinals	97	65	.599	—	47‍–‍34	50‍–‍31
San Francisco Giants	88	74	.543	9	42‍–‍39	46‍–‍35
Chicago Cubs	84	78	.519	13	47‍–‍34	37‍–‍44
Cincinnati Reds	83	79	.512	14	40‍–‍41	43‍–‍38
Atlanta Braves	81	81	.500	16	41‍–‍40	40‍–‍41
Pittsburgh Pirates	80	82	.494	17	40‍–‍41	40‍–‍41
Los Angeles Dodgers	76	86	.469	21	41‍–‍40	35‍–‍46
Philadelphia Phillies	76	86	.469	21	38‍–‍43	38‍–‍43
New York Mets	73	89	.451	24	32‍–‍49	41‍–‍40
Houston Astros	72	90	.444	25	42‍–‍39	30‍–‍51

=== Record vs. opponents ===
1968 National League record Sources:
Team	ATL	CHC	CIN	HOU	LAD	NYM	PHI	PIT	SF	STL
Atlanta	—	8–10	10–8	11–7	9–9	12–6–1	11–7	6–12	9–9	5–13
Chicago	10–8	—	7–11	10–8	12–6	8–10	9–9	10–8	9–9–1	9–9
Cincinnati	8–10	11–7	—	9–9	9–9	10–8	11–7	10–8–1	8–10	7–11
Houston	7–11	8–10	9–9	—	11–7	10–8	9–9	5–13	8–10	5–13
Los Angeles	9–9	6–12	9–9	7–11	—	7–11	10–8	10–8	9–9	9–9
New York	6–12–1	10–8	8–10	8–10	11–7	—	8–10	9–9	7–11	6–12
Philadelphia	7–11	9–9	7–11	9–9	8–10	10–8	—	9–9	9–9	8–10
Pittsburgh	12–6	8–10	8–10–1	13–5	8–10	9–9	9–9	—	7–11	6–12
San Francisco	9–9	9–9–1	10–8	10–8	9–9	11–7	9–9	11–7	—	10–8
St. Louis	13–5	9–9	11–7	13–5	9–9	12–6	10–8	12–6	8–10	—

=== Notable transactions ===
- May 4, 1968: Byron Browne was traded by the Cubs to the Houston Astros for Aaron Pointer.
- June 7, 1968: 1968 Major League Baseball draft
  - Oscar Gamble was drafted by the Cubs in the 16th round. Player signed June 18, 1968.
  - Paul Reuschel was drafted by the Cubs in the 4th round of the Secondary Phase. Player signed June 17, 1968.
- June 14, 1968: Ramón Hernández was purchased from the Cubs by the St. Louis Cardinals.

=== Roster ===
1968 Chicago Cubs
Roster
Pitchers: 47 Jophery Brown; 38 Darcy Fast; 49 Bill Hands; 42 Chuck Hartenstein; 33 Ramón Hernández; 30 Ken Holtzman; 31 Ferguson Jenkins; 40 Jack Lamabe; 40 Pete Mikkelsen; 48 Joe Niekro; 32 Rich Nye; 37 Frank Reberger; 27 Phil Regan; 39 Archie Reynolds; 33 Gary Ross; 36 Bill Stoneman; 38,45 Bobby Tiefenauer; 37 John Upham	Catchers: 6 Randy Bobb; 12 John Boccabella; 24 John Felske; 9 Randy Hundley; 8 Bill Plummer; Infielders: 14 Ernie Banks; 18 Glenn Beckert; 19 Lee Elia; 29 Clarence Jones; 11 Don Kessinger; 22 Vic LaRose; 15 Dick Nen; 12 Gene Oliver; 10 Ron Santo	Outfielders: 17 José Arcia; 28 Jim Hickman; 41 Lou Johnson; 24 Jimmy McMath; 20 Adolfo Phillips; 25 Ted Savage; 25 Willie Smith; 21 Al Spangler; 26 Billy Williams; Other batters: 6 John Stephenson	Manager: 2 Leo Durocher; Coaches: 5 Joey Amalfitano; 3 Joe Becker; 7 Pete Reiser; 4 Verlon Walker

== Player stats ==
=== Batting ===
==== Starters by position ====
Note: Pos = Position; G = Games played; AB = At bats; H = Hits; Avg. = Batting average; HR = Home runs; RBI = Runs batted in

Pos	Player	G	AB	H	Avg.	HR	RBI
C	Randy Hundley	160	553	125	.226	7	65
1B	Ernie Banks	150	552	136	.246	32	83
2B	Glenn Beckert	155	643	189	.294	4	37
SS	Don Kessinger	160	655	157	.240	1	32
3B	Ron Santo	162	577	142	.246	26	98
LF	Billy Williams	163	642	185	.288	30	98
CF	Adolfo Phillips	143	439	106	.241	13	33
RF	Lou Johnson	62	205	50	.244	1	14

==== Other batters ====
Note: G = Games played; AB = At bats; H = Hits; Avg. = Batting average; HR = Home runs; RBI = Runs batted in

Player	G	AB	H	Avg.	HR	RBI
Jim Hickman	75	188	42	.223	5	23
Al Spangler	88	177	48	.271	2	18
Willie Smith	55	142	39	.275	5	25
Dick Nen	81	94	17	.181	2	16
José Arcia	59	84	16	.190	1	8
Lee Elia	15	17	3	.176	0	3
John Boccabella	7	14	1	.071	0	1
Jimmy McMath	6	14	2	.143	0	2
Gene Oliver	8	11	4	.364	0	1
John Upham	13	10	2	.200	0	0
Randy Bobb	7	8	1	.125	0	0
Ted Savage	3	8	2	.250	0	0
Clarence Jones	5	2	0	.000	0	0
Vic LaRose	4	2	0	.000	0	0
Bill Plummer	2	2	0	.000	0	0
John Stephenson	2	2	0	.000	0	0
John Felske	4	2	0	.000	0	0

=== Pitching ===
==== Starting pitchers ====
Note: G = Games pitched; IP = Innings pitched; W = Wins; L = Losses; ERA = Earned run average; SO = Strikeouts

Player	G	IP	W	L	ERA	SO
Ferguson Jenkins	40	308.0	20	15	2.63	260
Bill Hands	38	258.2	16	10	2.89	148
Ken Holtzman	34	215.0	11	14	3.35	151
Joe Niekro	34	177.1	14	10	4.31	65
Rich Nye	27	132.2	7	12	3.80	74

==== Other pitchers ====
Note: G = Games pitched; IP = Innings pitched; W = Wins; L = Losses; ERA = Earned run average; SO = Strikeouts

Player	G	IP	W	L	ERA	SO
Gary Ross	13	41.0	1	1	4.17	31
Archie Reynolds	7	13.1	0	1	6.75	6
Darcy Fast	8	10.0	0	1	5.40	10
Frank Reberger	3	6.0	0	1	4.50	3

==== Relief pitchers ====
Note: G = Games pitched; W = Wins; L = Losses; SV = Saves; ERA = Earned run average; SO = Strikeouts

Player	G	W	L	SV	ERA	SO
Phil Regan	68	10	5	25	2.20	60
Jack Lamabe	42	3	2	2	4.30	30
Chuck Hartenstein	28	2	4	1	4.54	17
Bill Stoneman	18	0	1	0	5.52	18
Bobby Tiefenauer	9	0	1	1	6.08	9
Ramón Hernández	8	0	0	0	9.00	3
Pete Mikkelsen	3	0	0	0	7.71	5
John Upham	2	0	0	0	0.00	2
Willie Smith	1	0	0	0	0.00	2
Jophery Brown	1	0	0	0	4.50	0

== Farm system ==
Level	Team	League	Manager
AAA	Tacoma Cubs	Pacific Coast League	Whitey Lockman
AA	San Antonio Missions	Texas League	Harry Bright
A	Lodi Crushers	California League	Jim Marshall and Al Heist
A	Quincy Cubs	Midwest League	Walt Dixon
Rookie	Caldwell Cubs	Pioneer League	George Freese
