= 1968 San Francisco Giants season =

1968 San Francisco Giants
- League: National League
- Ballpark: Candlestick Park
- City: San Francisco, California
- Record: 88–74 (.543)
- League place: 2nd
- Owners: Horace Stoneham
- General managers: Chub Feeney
- Managers: Herman Franks
- Television: KTVU (Russ Hodges, Lon Simmons, Bill Thompson)
- Radio: KSFO (Russ Hodges, Lon Simmons, Bill Thompson)

The 1968 San Francisco Giants season was the Giants' 86th year in Major League Baseball, their 11th year in San Francisco since their move from New York following the 1957 season, and their ninth at Candlestick Park. The team finished in second place in the National League with an 88–74 record, 9 games behind the St. Louis Cardinals. The Giants' opponents scored 529 runs against them, the fewest in franchise history for a 162-game season. The Giants shut out the opposition 20 times, a record for the club's era in San Francisco.

== Offseason ==
- January 27, 1968: 1968 Major League Baseball draft
  - Garry Maddox was drafted by the Giants in the 2nd round.
  - George Foster was drafted by the Giants in the 3rd round.
- February 13, 1968: Tom Haller and Frank Kasheta (minors) were traded by the Giants to the Los Angeles Dodgers for Ron Hunt and Nate Oliver.

== Regular season ==
=== Season standings ===
National League
| Team | W | L | Pct. | GB | Home | Road |
|---|---|---|---|---|---|---|
| St. Louis Cardinals | 97 | 65 | .599 | — | 47‍–‍34 | 50‍–‍31 |
| San Francisco Giants | 88 | 74 | .543 | 9 | 42‍–‍39 | 46‍–‍35 |
| Chicago Cubs | 84 | 78 | .519 | 13 | 47‍–‍34 | 37‍–‍44 |
| Cincinnati Reds | 83 | 79 | .512 | 14 | 40‍–‍41 | 43‍–‍38 |
| Atlanta Braves | 81 | 81 | .500 | 16 | 41‍–‍40 | 40‍–‍41 |
| Pittsburgh Pirates | 80 | 82 | .494 | 17 | 40‍–‍41 | 40‍–‍41 |
| Los Angeles Dodgers | 76 | 86 | .469 | 21 | 41‍–‍40 | 35‍–‍46 |
| Philadelphia Phillies | 76 | 86 | .469 | 21 | 38‍–‍43 | 38‍–‍43 |
| New York Mets | 73 | 89 | .451 | 24 | 32‍–‍49 | 41‍–‍40 |
| Houston Astros | 72 | 90 | .444 | 25 | 42‍–‍39 | 30‍–‍51 |

=== Record vs. opponents ===
1968 National League record Sources:
| Team | ATL | CHC | CIN | HOU | LAD | NYM | PHI | PIT | SF | STL |
|---|---|---|---|---|---|---|---|---|---|---|
| Atlanta | — | 8–10 | 10–8 | 11–7 | 9–9 | 12–6–1 | 11–7 | 6–12 | 9–9 | 5–13 |
| Chicago | 10–8 | — | 7–11 | 10–8 | 12–6 | 8–10 | 9–9 | 10–8 | 9–9–1 | 9–9 |
| Cincinnati | 8–10 | 11–7 | — | 9–9 | 9–9 | 10–8 | 11–7 | 10–8–1 | 8–10 | 7–11 |
| Houston | 7–11 | 8–10 | 9–9 | — | 11–7 | 10–8 | 9–9 | 5–13 | 8–10 | 5–13 |
| Los Angeles | 9–9 | 6–12 | 9–9 | 7–11 | — | 7–11 | 10–8 | 10–8 | 9–9 | 9–9 |
| New York | 6–12–1 | 10–8 | 8–10 | 8–10 | 11–7 | — | 8–10 | 9–9 | 7–11 | 6–12 |
| Philadelphia | 7–11 | 9–9 | 7–11 | 9–9 | 8–10 | 10–8 | — | 9–9 | 9–9 | 8–10 |
| Pittsburgh | 12–6 | 8–10 | 8–10–1 | 13–5 | 8–10 | 9–9 | 9–9 | — | 7–11 | 6–12 |
| San Francisco | 9–9 | 9–9–1 | 10–8 | 10–8 | 9–9 | 11–7 | 9–9 | 11–7 | — | 10–8 |
| St. Louis | 13–5 | 9–9 | 11–7 | 13–5 | 9–9 | 12–6 | 10–8 | 12–6 | 8–10 | — |

=== Opening Day starters ===
- Jesús Alou
- Jim Davenport
- Jim Ray Hart
- Jack Hiatt
- Ron Hunt
- Hal Lanier
- Juan Marichal
- Willie Mays
- Willie McCovey

=== Notable transactions ===
- June 7, 1968: Jim Howarth was drafted by the Giants in the 8th round of the 1968 Major League Baseball draft.

=== Roster ===
1968 San Francisco Giants
Roster
| Pitchers: 42 Bobby Bolin; 28 Joe Gibbon; 45 Bill Henry; 34 Ron Herbel; 35 Frank Linzy; 27 Juan Marichal; 40 Mike McCormick; 39 Lindy McDaniel; 39 Bill Monbouquette; 36 Gaylord Perry; 43,45 Rich Robertson; 37 Ray Sadecki | Catchers: 1 Bob Barton; 2 Dick Dietz; 7 Jack Hiatt; Infielders: 12 Jim Davenport; 16 Jim Ray Hart; 33 Ron Hunt; 20 Frank Johnson; 22 Hal Lanier; 21 Don Mason; 44 Willie McCovey; 29 Nate Oliver; 15 Bob Schroder | Outfielders: 14 Jesús Alou; 25 Bobby Bonds; 25 Ollie Brown; 19 Ty Cline; 15 Ken Henderson; 18 Dave Marshall; 24 Willie Mays | Manager: 3 Herman Franks; Coaches: 9 Charlie Fox; 46 Larry Jansen; 6 Peanuts Lowrey; 5 Wes Westrum |

== Player stats ==
| = Indicates team leader |

| = Indicates league leader |

=== Batting ===
==== Starters by position ====
Note: Pos = Position; G = Games played; AB = At bats; H = Hits; Avg. = Batting average; HR = Home runs; RBI = Runs batted in

| Pos | Player | G | AB | H | Avg. | HR | RBI |
|---|---|---|---|---|---|---|---|
| C | Dick Dietz | 98 | 301 | 82 | .272 | 6 | 38 |
| 1B | Willie McCovey | 148 | 523 | 153 | .293 | 36 | 105 |
| 2B | Ron Hunt | 148 | 529 | 132 | .250 | 2 | 28 |
| 3B | Jim Ray Hart | 136 | 480 | 124 | .258 | 23 | 78 |
| SS | Hal Lanier | 151 | 486 | 100 | .206 | 0 | 27 |
| LF | Ty Cline | 116 | 291 | 65 | .223 | 1 | 28 |
| CF | Willie Mays | 148 | 498 | 144 | .289 | 23 | 79 |
| RF | Jesús Alou | 120 | 419 | 110 | .263 | 0 | 39 |

==== Other batters ====
Note: G = Games played; AB = At bats; H = Hits; Avg. = Batting average; HR = Home runs; RBI = Runs batted in

| Player | G | AB | H | Avg. | HR | RBI |
|---|---|---|---|---|---|---|
| Bobby Bonds | 81 | 307 | 78 | .254 | 9 | 35 |
| Jim Davenport | 113 | 272 | 61 | .224 | 1 | 17 |
| Jack Hiatt | 90 | 268 | 52 | .232 | 4 | 34 |
| Dave Marshall | 76 | 174 | 46 | .264 | 1 | 16 |
| Frank Johnson | 67 | 174 | 33 | .190 | 1 | 7 |
| Ollie Brown | 40 | 95 | 22 | .232 | 0 | 11 |
| Bob Barton | 46 | 92 | 24 | .261 | 0 | 5 |
| Nate Oliver | 36 | 73 | 13 | .178 | 0 | 1 |
| Bob Schroder | 35 | 44 | 7 | .159 | 0 | 2 |
| Don Mason | 10 | 19 | 3 | .158 | 0 | 1 |
| Ken Henderson | 3 | 3 | 1 | .333 | 0 | 0 |

=== Pitching ===
==== Starting pitchers ====
Note: G = Games pitched; IP = Innings pitched; W = Wins; L = Losses; ERA = Earned run average; SO = Strikeouts

| Player | G | IP | W | L | ERA | SO |
|---|---|---|---|---|---|---|
| Juan Marichal | 38 | 325.2 | 26 | 9 | 2.43 | 218 |
| Gaylord Perry | 39 | 290.2 | 16 | 15 | 2.45 | 173 |
| Ray Sadecki | 38 | 253.2 | 12 | 18 | 2.91 | 206 |
| Mike McCormick | 38 | 198.1 | 12 | 14 | 3.58 | 121 |

==== Other pitchers ====
Note: G = Games pitched; IP = Innings pitched; W = Wins; L = Losses; ERA = Earned run average; SO = Strikeouts

| Player | G | IP | W | L | ERA | SO |
|---|---|---|---|---|---|---|
| Bobby Bolin | 34 | 176.2 | 10 | 5 | 1.99 | 126 |
| Rich Robertson | 3 | 9.0 | 2 | 0 | 6.00 | 8 |

==== Relief pitchers ====
Note: G = Games pitched; W = Wins; L = Losses; SV = Saves; ERA = Earned run average; SO = Strikeouts

| Player | G | W | L | SV | ERA | SO |
|---|---|---|---|---|---|---|
| Frank Linzy | 57 | 9 | 8 | 12 | 2.08 | 36 |
| Joe Gibbon | 29 | 1 | 2 | 1 | 1.58 | 22 |
| Ron Herbel | 28 | 0 | 0 | 0 | 3.35 | 18 |
| Lindy McDaniel | 12 | 0 | 0 | 0 | 7.45 | 9 |
| Bill Monbouquette | 7 | 0 | 1 | 1 | 3.75 | 5 |
| Bill Henry | 7 | 0 | 2 | 0 | 5.40 | 0 |

== Awards and honors ==
- Willie Mays, All-Star Game MVP Award

All-Star Game

- Willie McCovey, First Base, Starter
- Willie Mays, Outfield, Starter
- Juan Marichal, Pitcher, Reserve

== Farm system ==
| Level | Team | League | Manager |
|---|---|---|---|
| AAA | Phoenix Giants | Pacific Coast League | Clyde King |
| AA | Amarillo Giants | Texas League | Andy Gilbert |
| A | Fresno Giants | California League | Dave Garcia |
| A | Decatur Commodores | Midwest League | Dennis Sommers |
| A-Short Season | Medford Giants | Northwest League | Harvey Koepf |
| Rookie | Salt Lake City Giants | Pioneer League | Ray Malgradi |

LEAGUE CHAMPIONS: Fresno
