= Woody Woodward =

American baseball player (born 1942)

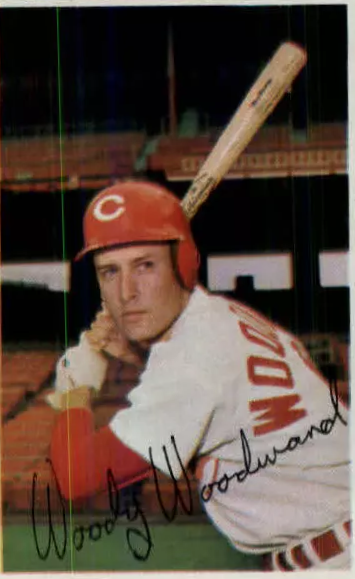
- Woodward in 1971
- Shortstop / Second baseman
- Born: September 23, 1942 (age 84); Miami, Florida, U.S.
- Batted: Right Threw: Right

MLB debut
- September 9, 1963, for the Milwaukee Braves

Last MLB appearance
- September 28, 1971, for the Cincinnati Reds

MLB statistics
- Batting average: .236
- Home runs: 1
- Runs batted in: 148
- Stats at Baseball Reference

Teams
- Milwaukee/Atlanta Braves (1963–1968); Cincinnati Reds (1968–1971)

William Frederick "Woody" Woodward (born September 23, 1942) is an American former professional baseball player, college baseball coach, and general manager. He played in Major League Baseball, primarily as a shortstop from 1963 to 1971 for the Atlanta Braves and the Cincinnati Reds. Woodward is better known for his tenure as general manager of the Seattle Mariners.

== Playing career ==
=== Amateur ===
Woodward played baseball at Coral Gables Senior High School and led the team to the 1960 Class AA state title. He attended Florida State University, where he played for the Florida State Seminoles baseball team. In 1963 he was named third-team All-American and was named to the College World Series all-tournament squad.

=== Professional ===
During his major league career, Woodward played for the Milwaukee/Atlanta Braves (1963–68) and the Cincinnati Reds (1968–71). A shortstop and second baseman, he appeared in 880 games with 517 hits. Woodward had a career .236 batting average with one home run and 148 runs batted in. He was acquired along with Tony Cloninger and Clay Carroll by the Reds from the Atlanta Braves for Milt Pappas, Bob Johnson, and Ted Davidson on June 11, 1968.

On July 10, 1970, Woodward hit his only major league home run in 2,423 plate appearances, a two-run shot off Ron Reed against the Atlanta Braves. Afterwards, he was quoted as saying, "If I hit one home run per every seven seasons, it will take me 4,998 seasons to catch Babe Ruth." Woodward played in four games of the 1970 World Series, which the Reds lost to the Baltimore Orioles in five games, with Woodward totaling one hit in five at bats.

Woodward was involved in a bizarre incident at Dodger Stadium in Los Angeles in 1971. During a night game against the Dodgers on Saturday, September 4, a sack of flour fell out of the sky and landed on the infield dirt, approximately ten feet (3 m) from where he was standing (at his shortstop position).

== Post-playing career ==
After a brief stint as Reds TV commentator, Woodward returned to FSU from 1975 to 1978 as head baseball coach, where his teams earned three NCAA tournament bids and one College World Series bid.

=== Front Office ===
After working as an assistant general manager for both the Cincinnati Reds and New York Yankees, Woodward was named the general manager of the New York Yankees in October 1986. His resignation at the end of the 1987 season led to a flurry of moves as then-manager Lou Piniella was promoted to general manager, and (for the fifth time) Billy Martin was named Yankees manager.

==== Phillies ====
The Philadelphia Phillies hired Woodward as general manager in October 1987, and fired him in June 1988. Phillies president Bill Giles refused to cite a reason for the termination after just six months. "It was a philosophical difference and that was the bottom line," said Woodward, who said he was 'shocked and disappointed' by his dismissal.

==== Mariners ====
In July 1988, Woodward became the general manager of the Seattle Mariners, working there until his retirement at the end of 1999. During his tenure, the Mariners made the playoffs in 1995 and 1997. His draft picks included Alex Rodriguez, Jason Varitek, Derek Lowe, Bret Boone, and Raúl Ibañez. Perhaps his most notable trade was in 1989, acquiring Randy Johnson from the Montreal Expos (or trading away David Ortiz). He later traded Johnson to the Houston Astros in 1998.

In January 2009, the Mariners hired Woodward as a part-time scout.

=== Honors ===
Woodward is a 1981 inductee of the Florida State University Athletic Hall of Fame.

Sporting positions
Preceded by Clyde King	New York Yankees general manager 1986–1987	Succeeded by Lou Piniella
Preceded by Bill Giles	Philadelphia Phillies general manager 1987–1988	Succeeded by Lee Thomas
Preceded by Dick Balderson	Seattle Mariners general manager 1988–1999	Succeeded by Pat Gillick
