= 1968 Atlanta Braves season =

1968 Atlanta Braves
- League: National League
- Ballpark: Atlanta Stadium
- City: Atlanta
- Record: 81–81 (.500)
- League place: 5th
- Owners: William Bartholomay
- General managers: Paul Richards
- Managers: Lum Harris
- Television: WSB-TV (Ernie Johnson, Milo Hamilton, Dizzy Dean, Carl Sell)
- Radio: WSB (Ernie Johnson, Milo Hamilton, Carl Sell)

The 1968 Atlanta Braves season was the third season in Atlanta and the 98th overall season of the franchise. The team went 81–81 in the final season of play before both the American and National Leagues were split into divisions the following season.

== Offseason ==
- October 6, 1967: Bob Uecker was released by the Braves.
- November 28, 1967: Ramón Hernández was drafted from the Braves by the Chicago Cubs in the 1967 rule 5 draft.
- December 7, 1967: Bobby Cox was traded by the Braves to the New York Yankees for Bob Tillman and Dale Roberts.

== Regular season ==
=== Season standings ===
National League
| Team | W | L | Pct. | GB | Home | Road |
|---|---|---|---|---|---|---|
| St. Louis Cardinals | 97 | 65 | .599 | — | 47‍–‍34 | 50‍–‍31 |
| San Francisco Giants | 88 | 74 | .543 | 9 | 42‍–‍39 | 46‍–‍35 |
| Chicago Cubs | 84 | 78 | .519 | 13 | 47‍–‍34 | 37‍–‍44 |
| Cincinnati Reds | 83 | 79 | .512 | 14 | 40‍–‍41 | 43‍–‍38 |
| Atlanta Braves | 81 | 81 | .500 | 16 | 41‍–‍40 | 40‍–‍41 |
| Pittsburgh Pirates | 80 | 82 | .494 | 17 | 40‍–‍41 | 40‍–‍41 |
| Los Angeles Dodgers | 76 | 86 | .469 | 21 | 41‍–‍40 | 35‍–‍46 |
| Philadelphia Phillies | 76 | 86 | .469 | 21 | 38‍–‍43 | 38‍–‍43 |
| New York Mets | 73 | 89 | .451 | 24 | 32‍–‍49 | 41‍–‍40 |
| Houston Astros | 72 | 90 | .444 | 25 | 42‍–‍39 | 30‍–‍51 |

=== Record vs. opponents ===
1968 National League record Sources:
| Team | ATL | CHC | CIN | HOU | LAD | NYM | PHI | PIT | SF | STL |
|---|---|---|---|---|---|---|---|---|---|---|
| Atlanta | — | 8–10 | 10–8 | 11–7 | 9–9 | 12–6–1 | 11–7 | 6–12 | 9–9 | 5–13 |
| Chicago | 10–8 | — | 7–11 | 10–8 | 12–6 | 8–10 | 9–9 | 10–8 | 9–9–1 | 9–9 |
| Cincinnati | 8–10 | 11–7 | — | 9–9 | 9–9 | 10–8 | 11–7 | 10–8–1 | 8–10 | 7–11 |
| Houston | 7–11 | 8–10 | 9–9 | — | 11–7 | 10–8 | 9–9 | 5–13 | 8–10 | 5–13 |
| Los Angeles | 9–9 | 6–12 | 9–9 | 7–11 | — | 7–11 | 10–8 | 10–8 | 9–9 | 9–9 |
| New York | 6–12–1 | 10–8 | 8–10 | 8–10 | 11–7 | — | 8–10 | 9–9 | 7–11 | 6–12 |
| Philadelphia | 7–11 | 9–9 | 7–11 | 9–9 | 8–10 | 10–8 | — | 9–9 | 9–9 | 8–10 |
| Pittsburgh | 12–6 | 8–10 | 8–10–1 | 13–5 | 8–10 | 9–9 | 9–9 | — | 7–11 | 6–12 |
| San Francisco | 9–9 | 9–9–1 | 10–8 | 10–8 | 9–9 | 11–7 | 9–9 | 11–7 | — | 10–8 |
| St. Louis | 13–5 | 9–9 | 11–7 | 13–5 | 9–9 | 12–6 | 10–8 | 12–6 | 8–10 | — |

=== Roster ===
1968 Atlanta Braves
Roster
| Pitchers: 42 Jim Britton; 20 Clay Carroll; 40 Tony Cloninger; 23 Ted Davidson; 37 Skip Guinn; 33 Pat Jarvis; 30 Ken Johnson; 22 Dick Kelley; 37 Rick Kester; 23,47 Stu Miller; 35 Phil Niekro; 32 Milt Pappas; 36 Claude Raymond; 38 Ron Reed; 24 Al Santorini; 40 George Stone; 34 Cecil Upshaw | Catchers: 39 Walt Hriniak; 10 Bob Tillman; 15 Joe Torre; Infielders: 6 Clete Boyer; 23 Wayne Causey; 7 Gil Garrido; 16 Sonny Jackson; 14 Bob Johnson; 11 Deron Johnson; 2 Marty Martínez; 17 Félix Millán; 14 Woody Woodward | Outfielders: 44 Hank Aaron; 18 Tommie Aaron; 29 Felipe Alou; 12 Dusty Baker; 19 Tito Francona; 28 Mike Lum; 43 Mike Page; 48 Sandy Valdespino; Other batters: 48 Ralph Garr | Manager: 26 Lum Harris; Coaches: 8 Jim Busby; 5 Harry Dorish; 9 Billy Goodman; 3 Ken Silvestri |

== Player stats ==
| = Indicates team leader |

| = Indicates league leader |

=== Batting ===
==== Starters by position ====
Note: Pos = Position; G = Games played; AB = At bats; H = Hits; Avg. = Batting average; HR = Home runs; RBI = Runs batted in

| Pos | Player | G | AB | H | Avg. | HR | RBI |
|---|---|---|---|---|---|---|---|
| C | Joe Torre | 115 | 424 | 115 | .271 | 10 | 55 |
| 1B | Deron Johnson | 127 | 342 | 71 | .208 | 8 | 33 |
| 2B | Félix Millán | 149 | 570 | 165 | .289 | 1 | 33 |
| SS | Sonny Jackson | 105 | 358 | 81 | .226 | 1 | 19 |
| 3B | Clete Boyer | 71 | 273 | 62 | .227 | 4 | 17 |
| LF | Tito Francona | 122 | 346 | 99 | .286 | 2 | 47 |
| CF | Felipe Alou | 160 | 662 | 210* | .317 | 11 | 57 |
| RF | Hank Aaron | 160 | 606 | 174 | .287 | 29 | 86 |

- Tied with Pete Rose

==== Other batters ====
Note: G = Games played; AB = At bats; H = Hits; Avg. = Batting average; HR = Home runs; RBI = Runs batted in

| Player | G | AB | H | Avg. | HR | RBI |
|---|---|---|---|---|---|---|
| Marty Martínez | 113 | 356 | 82 | .230 | 0 | 12 |
| Tommie Aaron | 98 | 283 | 69 | .244 | 1 | 25 |
| Bob Tillman | 86 | 236 | 52 | .220 | 5 | 20 |
| Mike Lum | 122 | 232 | 52 | .220 | 5 | 20 |
| Bob Johnson | 59 | 187 | 49 | .262 | 0 | 11 |
| Sandy Valdespino | 36 | 86 | 20 | .233 | 1 | 4 |
| Gil Garrido | 18 | 53 | 11 | .208 | 0 | 2 |
| Wayne Causey | 16 | 37 | 4 | .108 | 1 | 4 |
| Mike Page | 20 | 28 | 5 | .179 | 0 | 1 |
| Walt Hriniak | 9 | 26 | 9 | .346 | 0 | 3 |
| Woody Woodward | 12 | 24 | 4 | .167 | 0 | 1 |
| Ralph Garr | 11 | 7 | 2 | .286 | 0 | 0 |
| Dusty Baker | 6 | 5 | 2 | .400 | 0 | 0 |

=== Pitching ===
==== Starting pitchers ====
Note: G = Games pitched; IP = Innings pitched; W = Wins; L = Losses; ERA = Earned run average; SO = Strikeouts

| Player | G | IP | W | L | ERA | SO |
|---|---|---|---|---|---|---|
| Phil Niekro | 37 | 256.2 | 14 | 12 | 2.59 | 140 |
| Pat Jarvis | 34 | 256.0 | 16 | 12 | 2.60 | 157 |
| Ron Reed | 35 | 201.2 | 11 | 10 | 3.35 | 111 |
| Milt Pappas | 22 | 121.1 | 10 | 8 | 2.37 | 75 |
| Al Santorini | 1 | 3.0 | 0 | 1 | 0.00 | 0 |

==== Other pitchers ====
Note: G = Games pitched; IP = Innings pitched; W = Wins; L = Losses; ERA = Earned run average; SO = Strikeouts

| Player | G | IP | W | L | ERA | SO |
|---|---|---|---|---|---|---|
| Ken Johnson | 31 | 135.0 | 5 | 8 | 3.47 | 57 |
| Dick Kelley | 31 | 98.1 | 2 | 4 | 2.75 | 73 |
| Jim Britton | 34 | 90.0 | 4 | 6 | 3.10 | 61 |
| George Stone | 17 | 75.0 | 7 | 4 | 2.76 | 52 |
| Tony Cloninger | 8 | 19.0 | 3 | 0 | 4.26 | 7 |

==== Relief pitchers ====
Note: G = Games pitched; W = Wins; L = Losses; SV = Saves; ERA = Earned run average; SO = Strikeouts

| Player | G | W | L | SV | ERA | SO |
|---|---|---|---|---|---|---|
| Cecil Upshaw | 52 | 8 | 7 | 13 | 2.47 | 74 |
| Claude Raymond | 36 | 3 | 5 | 10 | 2.83 | 37 |
| Clay Carroll | 10 | 0 | 1 | 0 | 4.84 | 10 |
| Rick Kester | 5 | 0 | 0 | 0 | 5.68 | 9 |
| Ted Davidson | 4 | 0 | 0 | 0 | 6.75 | 3 |
| Skip Guinn | 3 | 0 | 0 | 0 | 3.60 | 4 |
| Stu Miller | 2 | 0 | 0 | 0 | 54.00 | 1 |

== Farm system ==
| Level | Team | League | Manager |
|---|---|---|---|
| AAA | Richmond Braves | International League | Eddie Haas |
| AA | Shreveport Braves | Texas League | Charley Lau |
| A | West Palm Beach Braves | Florida State League | Andy Pafko |
| A | Greenwood Braves | Western Carolinas League | Lou Fitzgerald |
| Rookie | Magic Valley Cowboys | Pioneer League | Connie Ryan |

LEAGUE CHAMPIONS: Greenwood
