= 1968 New York Mets season =

1968 New York Mets
- League: National League
- Ballpark: Shea Stadium
- City: New York
- Record: 73–89 (.451)
- League place: 9th
- Owners: Joan Whitney Payson
- General manager: Johnny Murphy
- Manager: Gil Hodges
- Television: WOR-TV
- Radio: WJRZ/WABC-FM (Ralph Kiner, Lindsey Nelson, Bob Murphy)

The 1968 New York Mets season was the seventh regular season for the Mets. They went 73–89 and finished ninth in the National League, twenty-four games behind the first place St. Louis Cardinals They were managed by Gil Hodges. They played home games at Shea Stadium.

== Offseason ==
- November 28, 1967: Clyde Mashore was drafted by the Mets from the Cincinnati Reds in the 1967 rule 5 draft.
- November 28, 1967: Darrell Sutherland was drafted from the Mets by the Cleveland Indians in the 1967 minor league draft.
- November 29, 1967: Bill Short was sold to the New York Mets by the Pittsburgh Pirates.
- December 15, 1967: Tommy Davis, Jack Fisher, Billy Wynne, and Buddy Booker were traded by the Mets to the Chicago White Sox for Tommie Agee and Al Weis.
- March 28, 1968: Clyde Mashore was returned by the Mets to the Cincinnati Reds.

== Regular season ==
1968 marked the beginning of Gil Hodges' tenure at the helm. A former infielder with the Brooklyn Dodgers, he replaced Salty Parker as manager. Despite the team's 9th place finish, the Mets managed to narrowly avoid yet another last place ranking, and boasted their best record since their inception in 1962. They would go on to stun the baseball world the following year when they won the World Series.

=== Season standings ===
National League
Team	W	L	Pct.	GB	Home	Road
St. Louis Cardinals	97	65	.599	—	47‍–‍34	50‍–‍31
San Francisco Giants	88	74	.543	9	42‍–‍39	46‍–‍35
Chicago Cubs	84	78	.519	13	47‍–‍34	37‍–‍44
Cincinnati Reds	83	79	.512	14	40‍–‍41	43‍–‍38
Atlanta Braves	81	81	.500	16	41‍–‍40	40‍–‍41
Pittsburgh Pirates	80	82	.494	17	40‍–‍41	40‍–‍41
Los Angeles Dodgers	76	86	.469	21	41‍–‍40	35‍–‍46
Philadelphia Phillies	76	86	.469	21	38‍–‍43	38‍–‍43
New York Mets	73	89	.451	24	32‍–‍49	41‍–‍40
Houston Astros	72	90	.444	25	42‍–‍39	30‍–‍51

=== Record vs. opponents ===
1968 National League record Sources:
Team	ATL	CHC	CIN	HOU	LAD	NYM	PHI	PIT	SF	STL
Atlanta	—	8–10	10–8	11–7	9–9	12–6–1	11–7	6–12	9–9	5–13
Chicago	10–8	—	7–11	10–8	12–6	8–10	9–9	10–8	9–9–1	9–9
Cincinnati	8–10	11–7	—	9–9	9–9	10–8	11–7	10–8–1	8–10	7–11
Houston	7–11	8–10	9–9	—	11–7	10–8	9–9	5–13	8–10	5–13
Los Angeles	9–9	6–12	9–9	7–11	—	7–11	10–8	10–8	9–9	9–9
New York	6–12–1	10–8	8–10	8–10	11–7	—	8–10	9–9	7–11	6–12
Philadelphia	7–11	9–9	7–11	9–9	8–10	10–8	—	9–9	9–9	8–10
Pittsburgh	12–6	8–10	8–10–1	13–5	8–10	9–9	9–9	—	7–11	6–12
San Francisco	9–9	9–9–1	10–8	10–8	9–9	11–7	9–9	11–7	—	10–8
St. Louis	13–5	9–9	11–7	13–5	9–9	12–6	10–8	12–6	8–10	—

=== Roster ===
1968 New York Mets
Roster
Pitchers: 27 Don Cardwell; 33,45 Bill Connors; 29 Danny Frisella; 38 Al Jackson; 34 Cal Koonce; 36 Jerry Koosman; 43 Jim McAndrew; 31 Les Rohr; 30 Nolan Ryan; 41 Tom Seaver; 39 Dick Selma; 35 Don Shaw; 40 Bill Short; 42 Ron Taylor	Catchers: 10 Duffy Dyer; 15 Jerry Grote; 9 J. C. Martin; Infielders: 12 Ken Boswell; 1 Jerry Buchek; 5 Ed Charles; 16 Kevin Collins; 10 Greg Goossen; 3 Bud Harrelson; 23 Bob Heise; 16 Mike Jorgensen; 7 Ed Kranepool; 2 Phil Linz; 6 Al Weis	Outfielders: 20 Tommie Agee; 17 Don Bosch; 21 Cleon Jones; 24 Art Shamsky; 25 Larry Stahl; 4 Ron Swoboda	Manager: 14 Gil Hodges; Coaches: 8 Yogi Berra; 52 Joe Pignatano; 54 Rube Walker; 53 Eddie Yost

== Player stats ==
=== Batting ===
==== Starters by position ====
Note: Pos = Position; G = Games played; AB = At bats; H = Hits; Avg. = Batting average; HR = Home runs; RBI = Runs batted in

Pos	Player	G	AB	H	Avg.	HR	RBI
C	Jerry Grote	124	404	114	.282	3	31
1B	Ed Kranepool	127	373	86	.231	3	20
2B	Ken Boswell	75	284	74	.261	4	11
SS	Bud Harrelson	111	402	88	.219	0	14
3B	Ed Charles	117	369	102	.276	15	53
LF	Cleon Jones	147	509	151	.297	14	55
CF	Tommie Agee	132	368	80	.217	5	17
RF	Ron Swoboda	132	450	109	.242	11	59

==== Other batters ====
Note: G = Games played; AB = At bats; H = Hits; Avg. = Batting average; HR = Home runs; RBI = Runs batted in

Player	G	AB	H	Avg.	HR	RBI
Art Shamsky	116	345	82	.238	12	48
Al Weis	90	274	47	.172	2	14
Phil Linz	78	258	54	.209	0	17
J.C. Martin	78	244	55	.225	3	31
Jerry Buchek	73	192	35	.182	1	11
Larry Stahl	53	183	43	.235	3	10
Kevin Collins	58	154	31	.201	1	13
Don Bosch	50	111	19	.171	3	7
Greg Goossen	38	106	22	.208	0	6
Bob Heise	6	23	5	.217	0	1
Mike Jorgensen	8	14	2	.143	0	0
Duffy Dyer	1	3	1	.333	0	0

=== Pitching ===
==== Starting pitchers ====
Note: G = Games pitched; IP = Innings pitched; W = Wins; L = Losses; ERA = Earned run average; SO = Strikeouts

Player	G	IP	W	L	ERA	SO
Tom Seaver	36	278.0	16	12	2.20	205
Jerry Koosman	35	263.2	19	12	2.08	178
Don Cardwell	29	180.0	7	13	2.95	82
Dick Selma	33	170.1	9	10	2.75	117
Nolan Ryan	21	134.0	6	9	3.09	133
Jim McAndrew	12	79.0	4	7	2.28	46

==== Other pitchers ====
Note: G = Games pitched; IP = Innings pitched; W = Wins; L = Losses; ERA = Earned run average; SO = Strikeouts

Player	G	IP	W	L	ERA	SO
Al Jackson	25	92.2	3	7	3.69	59
Danny Frisella	19	50.2	2	4	3.91	47
Les Rohr	2	6.0	0	2	4.50	5

==== Relief pitchers ====
Note: G = Games pitched; IP = Innings pitched; W = Wins; L = Losses; ERA = Earned run average; SO = Strikeouts

Player	G	W	L	SV	ERA	SO
Ron Taylor	58	1	5	14	2.70	49
Cal Koonce	55	6	4	11	2.42	50
Bill Short	34	0	3	1	4.85	24
Bill Connors	9	0	1	0	9.00	8
Don Shaw	7	0	0	0	0.75	11

== Farm system ==
Level	Team	League	Manager
AAA	Jacksonville Suns	International League	Clyde McCullough
AA	Memphis Blues	Texas League	Roy Sievers
A	Visalia Mets	California League	Roy McMillan
A	Raleigh-Durham Mets	Carolina League	Pete Pavlick
A-Short Season	Mankato Mets	Northern League	Joe Frazier
Rookie	Marion Mets	Appalachian League	Gary Gearhart

LEAGUE CHAMPIONS: Jacksonville, Marion
