= 1968 St. Louis Cardinals season =

Major League Baseball season

1968 St. Louis Cardinals
- National League champions
- League: National League
- Ballpark: Busch Memorial Stadium
- City: St. Louis, Missouri
- Record: 97–65 (.599)
- League place: 1st
- Owners: August "Gussie" Busch
- General managers: Bing Devine
- Managers: Red Schoendienst
- Television: KSD-TV
- Radio: KMOX (Harry Caray, Jack Buck)

The 1968 St. Louis Cardinals season was the team's 87th season in St. Louis, Missouri and its 77th season in the National League. The Cardinals went 97–65 during the season, winning their second consecutive NL pennant, this time by nine games over the San Francisco Giants. They lost in 7 games to the Detroit Tigers in the World Series. The Cardinals would not return to the postseason until 1982.

Following the season, Major League Baseball announced plans to split both the National and American Leagues into East and West divisions starting with the 1969 season in order to accommodate the inclusion of two new franchises to each league. The Cardinals were assigned to the new National League East division. Originally, the Cardinals were placed in the National League West division. However, the New York Mets, wanting to compensate for the loss of home games against the Los Angeles Dodgers and San Francisco Giants, desired three extra games against the Cardinals, the two-time defending NL champions. The Cardinals were thus moved to the National League East division along with the Chicago Cubs, who wished to maintain their long-standing rivalry with the Cardinals. The Atlanta Braves and Cincinnati Reds were correspondingly shifted to the National League West despite both being east of St. Louis and Chicago, a configuration maintained until 1993.

== Offseason ==
- Prior to 1968 season: Luis Meléndez was signed as an amateur free agent by the Cardinals.
- February 8, 1968: Jimy Williams and Pat Corrales were traded by the Cardinals to the Cincinnati Reds for Johnny Edwards.

== Regular season ==
Pitcher Bob Gibson won both the MVP Award and the Cy Young Award this year, with a 1.12 ERA, 22 wins, and 268 strikeouts. From June 2 to July 30, Gibson allowed only two earned runs in 92 innings pitched. For the season, opposing batters only had a batting average of .184, and an on-base percentage of .233 against Gibson. Gibson also won a Gold Glove this year, as did shortstop Dal Maxvill and outfielder Curt Flood.

=== Season standings ===
National League
Team	W	L	Pct.	GB	Home	Road
St. Louis Cardinals	97	65	.599	—	47‍–‍34	50‍–‍31
San Francisco Giants	88	74	.543	9	42‍–‍39	46‍–‍35
Chicago Cubs	84	78	.519	13	47‍–‍34	37‍–‍44
Cincinnati Reds	83	79	.512	14	40‍–‍41	43‍–‍38
Atlanta Braves	81	81	.500	16	41‍–‍40	40‍–‍41
Pittsburgh Pirates	80	82	.494	17	40‍–‍41	40‍–‍41
Los Angeles Dodgers	76	86	.469	21	41‍–‍40	35‍–‍46
Philadelphia Phillies	76	86	.469	21	38‍–‍43	38‍–‍43
New York Mets	73	89	.451	24	32‍–‍49	41‍–‍40
Houston Astros	72	90	.444	25	42‍–‍39	30‍–‍51

=== Record vs. opponents ===
1968 National League record Sources:
Team	ATL	CHC	CIN	HOU	LAD	NYM	PHI	PIT	SF	STL
Atlanta	—	8–10	10–8	11–7	9–9	12–6–1	11–7	6–12	9–9	5–13
Chicago	10–8	—	7–11	10–8	12–6	8–10	9–9	10–8	9–9–1	9–9
Cincinnati	8–10	11–7	—	9–9	9–9	10–8	11–7	10–8–1	8–10	7–11
Houston	7–11	8–10	9–9	—	11–7	10–8	9–9	5–13	8–10	5–13
Los Angeles	9–9	6–12	9–9	7–11	—	7–11	10–8	10–8	9–9	9–9
New York	6–12–1	10–8	8–10	8–10	11–7	—	8–10	9–9	7–11	6–12
Philadelphia	7–11	9–9	7–11	9–9	8–10	10–8	—	9–9	9–9	8–10
Pittsburgh	12–6	8–10	8–10–1	13–5	8–10	9–9	9–9	—	7–11	6–12
San Francisco	9–9	9–9–1	10–8	10–8	9–9	11–7	9–9	11–7	—	10–8
St. Louis	13–5	9–9	11–7	13–5	9–9	12–6	10–8	12–6	8–10	—

=== Notable transactions ===
- June 7, 1968: Bob Forsch was drafted by the Cardinals in the 26th round of the 1968 Major League Baseball draft.
- June 14, 1968: Ramón Hernández was purchased by the Cardinals from the Chicago Cubs.

=== Roster ===
1968 St. Louis Cardinals
Roster
Pitchers: 34 Nelson Briles; 32 Steve Carlton; 45 Bob Gibson; 47 Hal Gilson; 29 Wayne Granger; 43 Joe Hoerner; 31 Dick Hughes; 39 Larry Jaster; 46 Pete Mikkelsen; 47 Mel Nelson; 47 Mike Torrez; 44 Ray Washburn; 36 Ron Willis	Catchers: 7 Johnny Edwards; 15 Tim McCarver; 10 Dave Ricketts; 23 Ted Simmons; Infielders: 30 Orlando Cepeda; 16 Phil Gagliano; 25 Julián Javier; 27 Dal Maxvill; 11 Dick Schofield; 18 Mike Shannon	Outfielders: 20 Lou Brock; 14 Ron Davis; 21 Curt Flood; 12 Joe Hague; 9 Roger Maris; 12 Dick Simpson; 26 Ed Spiezio; 17 Bobby Tolan; Other batters: 37 Floyd Wicker	Manager: 2 Red Schoendienst; Coaches: 8 Bob Milliken; 4 Billy Muffett; 3 Joe Schultz; 5 Dick Sisler

== Player stats ==
=== Batting ===
==== Starters by position ====
Note: Pos = Position; G = Games played; AB = At bats; H = Hits; Avg. = Batting average; HR = Home runs; RBI = Runs batted in

Pos	Player	G	AB	H	Avg.	HR	RBI
C	Tim McCarver	128	434	110	.253	5	48
1B	Orlando Cepeda	157	600	149	.248	16	73
2B	Julián Javier	139	519	135	.260	4	52
SS	Dal Maxvill	119	459	116	.253	1	24
3B	Mike Shannon	156	576	153	.266	15	79
LF	Lou Brock	159	660	184	.279	6	51
CF	Curt Flood	150	618	186	.301	5	60
RF	Roger Maris	100	310	79	.255	5	45

==== Other batters ====
Note: G = Games played; AB = At bats; H = Hits; Avg. = Batting average; HR = Home runs; RBI = Runs batted in

Player	G	AB	H	Avg.	HR	RBI
Bobby Tolan	92	278	64	.230	5	17
Johnny Edwards	84	230	55	.239	3	29
Dick Schofield	69	127	28	.220	1	8
Phil Gagliano	53	105	24	.229	0	13
Ron Davis	33	79	14	.177	0	5
Dick Simpson	26	56	13	.232	3	8
Ed Spiezio	29	51	8	.157	0	2
Dave Ricketts	20	22	3	.136	0	1
Joe Hague	7	17	4	.235	1	1
Floyd Wicker	5	4	2	.500	0	0
Ted Simmons	2	3	1	.333	0	0

=== Pitching ===
==== Starting pitchers ====
Note: G = Games pitched; IP = Innings pitched; W = Wins; L = Losses; ERA = Earned run average; SO = Strikeouts

Player	G	IP	W	L	ERA	SO
Bob Gibson	34	304.2	22	9	1.12	268
Nelson Briles	33	243.1	19	11	2.81	141
Steve Carlton	34	231.1	13	11	2.99	162
Ray Washburn	31	215.1	14	8	2.26	124
Larry Jaster	31	153.2	9	13	3.51	70

==== Other pitchers ====
Note: G = Games pitched; IP = Innings pitched; W = Wins; L = Losses; ERA = Earned run average; SO = Strikeouts

Player	G	IP	W	L	ERA	SO
Dick Hughes	25	63.2	2	2	3.53	49
Mel Nelson	18	52.2	2	1	2.91	16
Mike Torrez	5	19.0	2	1	2.84	6
Pete Mikkelsen	5	16.0	0	0	1.13	8

==== Relief pitchers ====
Note: G = Games pitched; W = Wins; L = Losses; SV = Saves; ERA = Earned run average; SO = Strikeouts

Player	G	W	L	SV	ERA	SO
Joe Hoerner	47	8	2	17	1.47	42
Ron Willis	48	2	3	4	3.39	39
Wayne Granger	34	4	2	4	2.25	27
Hal Gilson	13	0	2	2	4.57	19

== 1968 World Series ==
Although essentially the same team as the previous year, they faced a tougher American League opponent in the Detroit Tigers, who had also won their pennant easily, behind the 31-win season of Denny McLain. Even though both Gibson and McLain were league MVPs that season, another Tigers starter, Mickey Lolich, stole the show, becoming the last pitcher to date to win three complete games in a single Series. Gibson excelled again in this World Series, winning Games 1 and 4. He had 17 strikeouts in Game 1 and totaled 35 strikeouts in the Series, both still World Series records. The Cardinals advanced to a 3–1 series lead, but the Tigers completed an improbable comeback by winning the final three games of the series to claim the championship, 4 games to 3. It was St. Louis' last Series appearance until 1982, and their last Series before MLB adopted its divisional format.

AL Detroit Tigers (4) vs. NL St. Louis Cardinals (3)

Game	Score	Date	Location	Attendance	Time of Game
1	Cardinals – 4, Tigers – 0	October 2	Busch Memorial Stadium	54,692	2:29
2	Tigers – 8, Cardinals – 1	October 3	Busch Memorial Stadium	54,692	2:41
3	Cardinals – 7, Tigers – 3	October 5	Tiger Stadium	53,634	3:17
4	Cardinals – 10, Tigers – 1	October 6	Tiger Stadium	53,634	2:34
5	Tigers – 5, Cardinals – 3	October 7	Tiger Stadium	53,634	2:43
6	Tigers – 13, Cardinals – 1	October 9	Busch Memorial Stadium	54,692	2:26
7	Tigers – 4, Cardinals – 1	October 10	Busch Memorial Stadium	54,692	2:07

== Awards and honors ==
- Red Schoendienst, Associated Press NL Manager of the Year

=== Major League Baseball records ===
- Bob Gibson, major league record, lowest ERA in one season for a pitcher with more than 300 innings pitched (1.12)

=== League leaders ===
- Lou Brock, National League stolen base leader, 62

== Farm system ==
Level	Team	League	Manager
AAA	Tulsa Oilers	Pacific Coast League	Warren Spahn
AA	Arkansas Travelers	Texas League	Vern Rapp
A	Modesto Reds	California League	Joe Cunningham
A	St. Petersburg Cardinals	Florida State League	Ron Plaza
A	Cedar Rapids Cardinals	Midwest League	Jack Krol
A-Short Season	Lewiston Broncos	Northwest League	Roy Majtyka
Rookie	GCL Cardinals	Gulf Coast League	George Kissell and Ray Hathaway

LEAGUE CHAMPIONS: Tulsa
