= 1968 Pittsburgh Pirates season =

1968 Pittsburgh Pirates
- League: National League
- Ballpark: Forbes Field
- City: Pittsburgh, Pennsylvania
- Owners: John W. Galbreath (majority shareholder); Bing Crosby, Thomas P. Johnson (minority shareholders)
- General managers: Joe L. Brown
- Managers: Larry Shepard
- Television: KDKA-TV; Bob Prince, Jim Woods, Nellie King
- Radio: KDKA; Bob Prince, Jim Woods, Nellie King

The 1968 Pittsburgh Pirates season was the 87th season of the Pittsburgh Pirates franchise; the 82nd in the National League. The Pirates finished sixth in the league standings with a record of 80–82.

== Offseason ==
- October 3, 1967: Billy O'Dell was released by the Pirates.
- October 13, 1967: Larry Shepard named manager of the Pirates.
- November 28, 1967: Dennis Ribant was traded by the Pirates to the Detroit Tigers for Dave Wickersham.
- November 28, 1967: Chuck Hiller was selected by Pirates from Philadelphia Phillies in the Rule 5 major league draft.
- November 29, 1967: Bill Short was sold by Pirates to the New York Mets.
- December 2, 1967: Bob Oliver was traded by the Pirates to the Minnesota Twins for Ron Kline.
- December 3, 1967: Jim Pagliaroni was sold by the Pirates to the Oakland Athletics.
- December 15, 1967: Woodie Fryman, Bill Laxton, Don Money and Harold Clem (minors) were traded by the Pirates to the Philadelphia Phillies for Jim Bunning.
- January 8, 1968: Frank Taveras was signed by the Pirates as a non-drafted free agent.
- January 27, 1968: Tom Dettore was drafted by the Pirates in the 3rd round of the 1968 Major League Baseball draft (secondary phase). Player signed March 29, 1968.

== Regular season ==
=== Season standings ===
National League
Team	W	L	Pct.	GB	Home	Road
St. Louis Cardinals	97	65	.599	—	47‍–‍34	50‍–‍31
San Francisco Giants	88	74	.543	9	42‍–‍39	46‍–‍35
Chicago Cubs	84	78	.519	13	47‍–‍34	37‍–‍44
Cincinnati Reds	83	79	.512	14	40‍–‍41	43‍–‍38
Atlanta Braves	81	81	.500	16	41‍–‍40	40‍–‍41
Pittsburgh Pirates	80	82	.494	17	40‍–‍41	40‍–‍41
Los Angeles Dodgers	76	86	.469	21	41‍–‍40	35‍–‍46
Philadelphia Phillies	76	86	.469	21	38‍–‍43	38‍–‍43
New York Mets	73	89	.451	24	32‍–‍49	41‍–‍40
Houston Astros	72	90	.444	25	42‍–‍39	30‍–‍51

=== Record vs. opponents ===
1968 National League record Sources:
Team	ATL	CHC	CIN	HOU	LAD	NYM	PHI	PIT	SF	STL
Atlanta	—	8–10	10–8	11–7	9–9	12–6–1	11–7	6–12	9–9	5–13
Chicago	10–8	—	7–11	10–8	12–6	8–10	9–9	10–8	9–9–1	9–9
Cincinnati	8–10	11–7	—	9–9	9–9	10–8	11–7	10–8–1	8–10	7–11
Houston	7–11	8–10	9–9	—	11–7	10–8	9–9	5–13	8–10	5–13
Los Angeles	9–9	6–12	9–9	7–11	—	7–11	10–8	10–8	9–9	9–9
New York	6–12–1	10–8	8–10	8–10	11–7	—	8–10	9–9	7–11	6–12
Philadelphia	7–11	9–9	7–11	9–9	8–10	10–8	—	9–9	9–9	8–10
Pittsburgh	12–6	8–10	8–10–1	13–5	8–10	9–9	9–9	—	7–11	6–12
San Francisco	9–9	9–9–1	10–8	10–8	9–9	11–7	9–9	11–7	—	10–8
St. Louis	13–5	9–9	11–7	13–5	9–9	12–6	10–8	12–6	8–10	—

=== Game log ===
1968 game log: 80–82 (home: 40–41; Away: 40–41)
April: 8–8 (home: 5–3; Away: 3–5)

#	Date	Opponent	Score	Win	Loss	Save	Attendance	Record
1	April 10	@ Astros	4–5	Dierker	**Pizarro** (0–1)	—	21,320	0–1
2	April 11	@ Giants	3–1 (15)	**Face** (1–0)	Linzy	**Moose** (1)	7,844	1–1
3	April 13	@ Giants	2–1	**McBean** (1–0)	Perry	—	11,488	2–1
4	April 14	@ Dodgers	3–0	**Bunning** (1–0)	Osteen	—	27,136	3–1
5	April 15	@ Dodgers	2–3	Singer	**Veale** (0–1)	—	16,214	3–2
6	April 17	Astros	13–4	**McBean** (2–0)	Lemaster	—	30,779	4–2
7	April 19	Giants	2–5	Marichal	**Bunning** (1–1)	—	24,224	4–3
8	April 20	Giants	0–1	Sadecki	**Veale** (0–2)	—	8,156	4–4
9	April 21	Giants	10–0	**McBean** (3–0)	McCormick	—	17,337	5–4
10	April 22	Dodgers	3–5	Brewer	**Moose** (0–1)	Billingham	7,963	5–5
11	April 24	Dodgers	4–3	**Bunning** (2–1)	Osteen	**Face** (1)	4,938	6–5
12	April 26	@ Cardinals	1–2	Gibson	**Veale** (0–3)	—	39,866	6–6
13	April 27	@ Cardinals	5–7	Briles	**McBean** (3–1)	Hoerner	20,863	6–7
14	April 28	@ Cardinals	2–4	Carlton	**Sisk** (0–1)	—	20,562	6–8
15	April 29	Cubs	7–4	**Blass** (1–0)	Jenkins	**Moose** (2)	5,603	7–8
16	April 30	Cubs	4–3	**Pizarro** (1–1)	Hartenstein	—	3,710	8–8

May: 10–15 (home: 4–9; Away: 6–6)

#	Date	Opponent	Score	Win	Loss	Save	Attendance	Record
17	May 1	Cubs	4–0	**McBean** (4–1)	Nye	—	5,449	9–8
18	May 2	Cubs	0–1	Niekro	**Bunning** (2–2)	—	7,249	9–9
19	May 3	@ Phillies	2–3	Farrell	**Kline** (0–1)	—	9,433	9–10
20	May 4	@ Phillies	2–3	Hall	**Face** (1–1)	—	15,834	9–11
21	May 5	@ Phillies	5–2	**Wickersham** (1–0)	Jackson	**Moose** (3)	9,407	10–11
22	May 6	@ Braves	2–1	**Bunning** (3–2)	Jarvis	**Kline** (1)	9,131	11–11
23	May 7	@ Braves	1–2	Upshaw	**McBean** (4–2)	—	6,610	11–12
24	May 8	@ Braves	4–3 (14)	**Kline** (1–1)	Upshaw	**Face** (2)	7,035	12–12
25	May 9	@ Braves	2–4	Reed	**Moose** (0–2)	Britton	5,704	12–13
26	May 10	Phillies	2–1	**Veale** (1–3)	Fryman	**Face** (3)	9,397	13–13
27	May 12	Phillies	2–1	**McBean** (5–2)	James	—	12,203	14–13
28	May 13	Cardinals	0–1	Briles	**Bunning** (3–3)	—	10,082	14–14
29	May 15	Cardinals	0–1	Carlton	**Blass** (1–1)	—	9,461	14–15
30	May 16	Cardinals	3–0	**Veale** (2–3)	Washburn	—	9,595	15–15
31	May 17	Reds	2–3	Maloney	**McBean** (5–3)	Abernathy	13,499	15–16
32	May 18	Reds	3–8	McCool	**Bunning** (3–4)	—	3,670	15–17
33	May 19	Reds	3–9	Culver	**Blass** (1–2)	Kelso	9,458	15–18
34	May 20	@ Mets	1–2	Koosman	**Veale** (2–4)	—	12,221	15–19
35	May 21	@ Mets	3–4 (17)	Taylor	**Moose** (0–3)	—	8,188	15–20
36	May 22	@ Cubs	13–6	**Sisk** (1–1)	Niekro	**Wickersham** (1)	5,075	16–20
37	May 24	@ Reds	8–5	**Kline** (2–1)	Culver	—	9,379	17–20
38	May 25	@ Reds	5–4 (12)	**Sisk** (2–1)	McCool	—	12,153	18–20
39	May 26	@ Reds	8–8 (7)			—	9,672	18–20
40	May 30	Mets	3–6	Koosman	**Bunning** (3–5)	Koonce		18–21
41	May 30	Mets	4–5	Selma	**Veale** (2–5)	Jackson	19,779	18–22
42	May 31	Braves	2–5	Niekro	**McBean** (5–4)	—	7,301	18–23

June: 18–13 (home: 9–5; Away: 9–8)

#	Date	Opponent	Score	Win	Loss	Save	Attendance	Record
43	June 2	Braves	8–4	**Kline** (3–1)	Cloninger	—		19–23
44	June 2	Braves	5–10	Jarvis	**Moose** (0–4)	Niekro	21,491	19–24
45	June 3	@ Dodgers	0–2	Osteen	**Veale** (2–6)	—	14,568	19–25
46	June 4	@ Dodgers	0–5	Drysdale	**Bunning** (3–6)	—	30,422	19–26
47	June 5	@ Dodgers	1–2 (10)	Singer	**McBean** (5–5)	—	14,660	19–27
48	June 6	@ Dodgers	2–4	Sutton	**Sisk** (2–2)	—	14,112	19–28
49	June 7	@ Astros	5–0	**Blass** (2–2)	Giusti	—	14,578	20–28
50	June 8	@ Astros	2–3	Lemaster	**Bunning** (3–7)	Buzhardt	21,447	20–29
51	June 9	@ Astros	3–1	**Moose** (1–4)	Cuellar	**Kline** (2)	12,862	21–29
52	June 10	@ Giants	0–8	Marichal	**Veale** (2–7)	—	4,356	21–30
53	June 11	@ Giants	7–4	**Kline** (4–1)	Sadecki	**Face** (4)	7,807	22–30
54	June 12	@ Giants	2–4	Bolin	**Bunning** (3–8)	Linzy	4,771	22–31
55	June 13	@ Giants	8–7	**Sisk** (3–2)	Linzy	**Face** (5)	6,028	23–31
56	June 14	Astros	3–0	**Moose** (2–4)	Lemaster	—	8,603	24–31
57	June 15	Astros	13–2	**Veale** (3–7)	Wilson	—	5,005	25–31
58	June 16	Astros	3–1	**Blass** (3–2)	Cuellar	**Face** (6)		26–31
59	June 16	Astros	11–2	**Sisk** (4–2)	Dierker	**Kline** (3)	8,448	27–31
60	June 17	Astros	4–3	**McBean** (6–5)	Giusti	**Face** (7)	5,887	28–31
61	June 18	Dodgers	3–2 (10)	**Ellis** (1–0)	Aguirre	—	13,721	29–31
62	June 19	Dodgers	2–1	**Veale** (4–7)	Singer	—	10,799	30–31
63	June 20	Dodgers	7–3	**Blass** (4–2)	Sutton	—		31–31
64	June 20	Dodgers	2–3 (10)	Billingham	**Face** (1–2)	Purdin	19,838	31–32
65	June 21	Giants	0–3	Bolin	**McBean** (6–6)	—	16,222	31–33
66	June 22	Giants	3–10	McCormick	**Moose** (2–5)	—	15,617	31–34
67	June 23	Giants	1–2	Marichal	**Bunning** (3–9)	—	16,843	31–35
68	June 25	@ Cardinals	3–2	**Veale** (5–7)	Carlton	**Walker** (1)	26,927	32–35
69	June 26	@ Cardinals	0–3	Gibson	**McBean** (6–7)	—		32–36
70	June 26	@ Cardinals	3–1	**Blass** (5–2)	Jaster	**Kline** (4)	30,641	33–36
71	June 28	@ Phillies	10–1	**Bunning** (4–9)	Fryman	—	18,994	34–36
72	June 29	@ Phillies	1–0	**Moose** (3–5)	Jackson	—	17,052	35–36
73	June 30	@ Phillies	5–2	**Veale** (6–7)	Farrell	—	8,884	36–36

July: 15–18 (home: 7–12; Away: 8–6)

#	Date	Opponent	Score	Win	Loss	Save	Attendance	Record
74	July 2	@ Mets	2–1	**McBean** (7–7)	Selma	**Face** (8)	27,350	37–36
75	July 3	@ Mets	8–1	**Blass** (6–2)	Ryan	—	14,909	38–36
76	July 4	@ Mets	3–2	**Kline** (5–1)	Koosman	—		39–36
77	July 4	@ Mets	3–4	Cardwell	**Bunning** (4–10)	Taylor	29,587	39–37
78	July 5	@ Cubs	4–0	**Veale** (7–7)	Nye	—	16,040	40–37
79	July 6	@ Cubs	1–6	Jenkins	**Walker** (0–1)	—		40–38
80	July 6	@ Cubs	2–10	Ross	**Sisk** (4–3)	—	30,794	40–39
81	July 7	@ Cubs	4–5	Regan	**Veale** (7–8)	—		40–40
82	July 7	@ Cubs	3–4	Regan	**Face** (1–3)	—	32,447	40–41
83	July 11	Phillies	0–5	Jackson	**Veale** (7–9)	—		40–42
84	July 11	Phillies	1–4	Short	**Moose** (3–6)	Boozer	15,371	40–43
85	July 12	Phillies	2–3	James	**Bunning** (4–11)	Boozer	9,206	40–44
86	July 13	Phillies	2–3 (16)	Short	**Ellis** (1–1)	—	6,869	40–45
87	July 14	Cubs	2–6	Niekro	**McBean** (7–8)	—	19,335	40–46
88	July 15	Cubs	1–2 (10)	Jenkins	**Walker** (0–2)	—	6,648	40–47
89	July 16	Mets	3–2	**Kline** (6–1)	Selma	—	6,123	41–47
90	July 17	Mets	8–2	**Blass** (7–2)	Koosman	—		42–47
91	July 17	Mets	4–5	Koonce	**Walker** (0–3)	Taylor	8,974	42–48
92	July 18	Mets	0–3	Seaver	**McBean** (7–9)	—	6,234	42–49
93	July 19	@ Braves	2–0	**Moose** (4–6)	Reed	—	17,286	43–49
94	July 20	@ Braves	2–1	**Veale** (8–9)	Niekro	—	20,771	44–49
95	July 21	@ Braves	6–0	**Blass** (8–2)	Pappas	—	25,109	45–49
96	July 23	Reds	6–7 (12)	Arrigo	**Face** (1–4)	Lee	8,739	45–50
97	July 25	Reds	0–2	Culver	**Veale** (8–10)	Carroll	5,797	45–51
98	July 26	Cardinals	1–9	Briles	**Blass** (8–3)	—		45–52
99	July 26	Cardinals	5–4 (10)	**Kline** (7–1)	Granger	—	23,515	46–52
100	July 27	Cardinals	0–4	Carlton	**Moose** (4–7)	—	12,147	46–53
101	July 28	Cardinals	7–1	**McBean** (8–9)	Jaster	—	14,926	47–53
102	July 29	Braves	3–2	**Veale** (9–10)	Reed	—	7,357	48–53
103	July 30	Braves	8–5	**Blass** (9–3)	Johnson	**Sisk** (1)		49–53
104	July 30	Braves	5–4 (10)	**Kline** (8–1)	Niekro	—	11,624	50–53
105	July 31	@ Reds	2–8	Arrigo	**Moose** (4–8)	—		50–54
106	July 31	@ Reds	10–1	**Ellis** (2–1)	Ritchie	**Face** (9)	14,780	51–54

August: 14–17 (home: 4–6; Away: 10–11)

#	Date	Opponent	Score	Win	Loss	Save	Attendance	Record
107	August 1	@ Reds	6–1	**Sisk** (5–3)	Maloney	**Face** (10)	10,926	52–54
108	August 2	@ Giants	3–1	**McBean** (9–9)	Perry	—	6,423	53–54
109	August 3	@ Giants	0–7	Sadecki	**Veale** (9–11)	—	9,251	53–55
110	August 4	@ Giants	0–2	Bolin	**Bunning** (4–12)	—	18,151	53–56
111	August 5	@ Dodgers	0–1 (10)	Brewer	**Blass** (9–4)	—	17,851	53–57
112	August 6	@ Dodgers	4–1	**Moose** (5–8)	Drysdale	**Kline** (5)	15,732	54–57
113	August 7	@ Dodgers	2–6	Sutton	**McBean** (9–10)	—	13,848	54–58
114	August 8	@ Astros	4–3	**Kline** (9–1)	Cuellar	**Face** (11)	14,851	55–58
115	August 9	@ Astros	1–2	Shea	**Ellis** (2–2)	—	15,270	55–59
116	August 10	@ Astros	3–16	Coombs	**Blass** (9–5)	—	12,814	55–60
117	August 10	@ Astros	7–4	**Kline** (10–1)	House	—	25,814	56–60
118	August 11	@ Astros	1–5	Dierker	**Sisk** (5–4)	Giusti	16,892	56–61
119	August 13	Giants	0–3	Marichal	**Veale** (9–12)	—	9,135	56–62
120	August 14	Giants	1–2 (10)	Perry	**Kline** (10–2)	—	6,926	56–63
121	August 15	Giants	2–0	**Blass** (10–5)	Bolin	—	6,859	57–63
122	August 16	Dodgers	4–8	Drysdale	**McBean** (9–11)	Billingham	8,221	57–64
123	August 17	Dodgers	3–0	**Moose** (6–8)	Kekich	**Kline** (6)	8,181	58–64
124	August 18	Dodgers	5–1	**Veale** (10–12)	Sutton	—	17,423	59–64
125	August 19	@ Reds	3–8	Arrigo	**Bunning** (4–13)	—	6,659	59–65
126	August 20	@ Reds	8–3	**Ellis** (3–2)	Ritchie	**Kline** (7)	8,103	60–65
127	August 21	@ Reds	19–1	**Blass** (11–5)	Maloney	**Face** (12)	8,155	61–65
128	August 22	@ Reds	5–7	Abernathy	**Sisk** (5–5)	—	7,195	61–66
129	August 23	@ Cardinals	2–3 (11)	Hoerner	**Kline** (10–3)	—	34,845	61–67
130	August 24	@ Cardinals	6–4	**Face** (2–4)	Gibson	—	31,019	62–67
131	August 25	@ Cardinals	2–4	Briles	**Ellis** (3–3)	Hoerner	26,756	62–68
132	August 26	@ Braves	4–0	**Blass** (12–5)	Pappas	—	7,491	63–68
133	August 27	@ Braves	4–3 (11)	**Kline** (11–3)	Britton	**Face** (13)	6,633	64–68
134	August 28	Cardinals	0–8	Gibson	**Veale** (10–13)	—	11,197	64–69
135	August 29	Cardinals	0–5	Washburn	**Moose** (6–9)	—	7,681	64–70
136	August 30	Braves	0–2	Pappas	**Ellis** (3–4)	Raymond	5,896	64–71
137	August 31	Braves	8–0	**Blass** (13–5)	Reed	—	4,671	65–71

September: 15–11 (home: 11–6; Away: 4–5)

#	Date	Opponent	Score	Win	Loss	Save	Attendance	Record
138	September 1	Braves	7–8 (11)	Raymond	**Kline** (11–4)	Britton	5,650	65–72
139	September 2	Astros	6–1	**Veale** (11–13)	Cuellar	—		66–72
140	September 2	Astros	4–3 (10)	**Dal Canton** (1–0)	Ray	—	6,225	67–72
141	September 3	Astros	3–2	**Ellis** (4–4)	Dierker	**Walker** (2)	3,003	68–72
142	September 6	Mets	2–1	**Blass** (14–5)	McAndrew	—	4,082	69–72
143	September 7	Mets	3–4	Koosman	**Bunning** (4–14)	Taylor	4,002	69–73
144	September 8	Mets	3–0	**Veale** (12–13)	Seaver	—	5,424	70–73
145	September 9	Phillies	7–8 (15)	Short	**Dal Canton** (1–1)	—	2,664	70–74
146	September 11	Phillies	6–8 (12)	Wagner	**McBean** (9–12)	Farrell		70–75
147	September 11	Phillies	6–4	**Blass** (15–5)	Wise	**Walker** (3)	2,789	71–75
148	September 13	@ Mets	0–2	Koosman	**Moose** (6–10)	—	17,245	71–76
149	September 14	@ Mets	6–0	**Veale** (13–13)	Seaver	—	15,676	72–76
150	September 15	@ Mets	3–0	**Blass** (16–5)	Cardwell	—	33,838	73–76
151	September 16	@ Phillies	6–1	**Ellis** (5–4)	Wise	—	2,087	74–76
152	September 17	@ Phillies	4–2	**Moose** (7–10)	Short	**Dal Canton** (1)	2,576	75–76
153	September 18	@ Phillies	1–2	Johnson	**Veale** (13–14)	Wagner	2,463	75–77
154	September 20	Cubs	5–0	**Blass** (17–5)	Jenkins	—	4,478	76–77
155	September 21	Cubs	5–1	**Ellis** (6–4)	Niekro	—	3,429	77–77
156	September 22	Cubs	5–1	**Moose** (8–10)	Holtzman	**Dal Canton** (2)	27,405	78–77
157	September 23	Reds	6–9	Kelso	**Kline** (11–5)	Carroll		78–78
158	September 23	Reds	2–1 (10)	**Kline** (12–5)	Kelso	—	4,232	79–78
159	September 24	Reds	2–0	**Blass** (18–5)	Nolan	—	4,044	80–78
160	September 25	Reds	0–3	Maloney	**Ellis** (6–5)	—	4,577	80–79
161	September 27	@ Cubs	1–4	Holtzman	**Moose** (8–11)	Regan	2,384	80–80
162	September 28	@ Cubs	3–4	Jenkins	**Blass** (18–6)	—	10,940	80–81
163	September 29	@ Cubs	4–5	Regan	**Moose** (8–12)	—	16,860	80–82

Legend: = Win = Loss = Tie
Bold = Pirates team member

=== Opening Day lineup ===
Opening Day Starters
#	Name	Position
30	Maury Wills	3B
22	Gene Alley	SS
21	Roberto Clemente	RF
8	Willie Stargell	LF
17	Donn Clendenon	1B
9	Bill Mazeroski	2B
18	Matty Alou	CF
12	Jerry May	C
14	Jim Bunning	SP

=== Notable transactions ===
- June 7, 1968: 1968 Major League Baseball draft
  - Milt May was drafted by the Pirates in the 11th round of the 1968 Major League draft.
  - Bruce Kison was drafted by the Pirates in the 14th round of the 1968 Major League draft.
- June 27, 1968: Juan Pizarro sold by the Pirates to the Boston Red Sox.
- July 15, 1968: Bill Virdon was signed as a free agent by the Pirates (Virdon, who was on the coaching staff, was activated as a player-coach while Freddie Patek was on the DL).
- August 13, 1968: Bill Virdon was released by the Pirates.
- August 19, 1968: Bill Henry was released by the Pirates.

=== Roster ===
1968 Pittsburgh Pirates
**Roster**
**Pitchers**: 28 Steve Blass; 14 Jim Bunning; 43 Bruce Dal Canton; 37,40 Dock Ellis; 26 Roy Face; 31 Bill Henry; 27 Ron Kline; 34 Al McBean; 38 Bob Moose; 29 Juan Pizarro; 25 Tommie Sisk; 39 Bob Veale; 23 Luke Walker; 40 Dave Wickersham	**Catchers**: 16 Chris Cannizzaro; 12 Jerry May; 36 Carl Taylor; **Infielders**: 22 Gene Alley; 17 Donn Clendenon; 2 Chuck Hiller; 9 Bill Mazeroski; 11 José Pagán; 2 Freddie Patek; 30 Maury Wills	**Outfielders**: 18 Matty Alou; 21 Roberto Clemente; 24 Manny Jiménez; 10 Gary Kolb; 15 Manny Mota; 29 Al Oliver; 8 Willie Stargell; 4 Bill Virdon; **Other batters**: 20 Richie Hebner	**Manager**: 7 Larry Shepard; **Coaches**: 5 Alex Grammas; 32 Vern Law; 6 Don Leppert; 4 Bill Virdon

== Statistics ==
Batting

Note: G = Games played; AB = At bats; H = Hits; Avg. = Batting average; HR = Home runs; RBI = Runs batted in

Regular Season
Player	G	AB	H	Avg.	HR	RBI
Chuck Hiller	11	13	5	0.385	0	1
Bill Virdon	6	3	1	0.333	1	2
Dave Wickersham	11	3	1	0.333	0	2
Matty Alou	146	558	185	0.332	0	52
Manny Jimenez	66	66	20	0.303	1	11
Roberto Clemente	132	502	146	0.291	18	57
Manny Mota	111	331	93	0.281	1	33
Maury Wills	153	627	174	0.278	0	31
Donn Clendenon	158	584	150	0.257	17	87
Freddie Patek	61	208	53	0.255	2	18
Bill Mazeroski	143	506	127	0.251	3	42
Gene Alley	133	474	116	0.245	4	39
Chris Cannizzaro	25	58	14	0.241	1	7
Willie Stargell	128	435	103	0.237	24	67
Jose Pagan	80	163	36	0.221	4	21
Jerry May	137	416	91	0.219	1	33
Gary Kolb	74	119	26	0.218	2	6
Carl Taylor	44	71	15	0.211	0	7
Al McBean	43	67	13	0.194	1	8
Steve Blass	35	80	11	0.138	0	8
Al Oliver	4	8	1	0.125	0	0
Bob Veale	36	82	9	0.110	0	1
Jim Bunning	27	51	5	0.098	0	3
Bob Moose	38	54	5	0.093	0	0
Tommie Sisk	33	24	2	0.083	0	0
Dock Ellis	27	29	2	0.069	0	2
Bruce Dal Canton	7	3	0	0.000	0	0
Roy Face	43	4	0	0.000	0	0
Richie Hebner	2	1	0	0.000	0	0
Bill Henry	10	3	0	0.000	0	0
Ron Kline	56	16	0	0.000	0	0
Juan Pizarro	13	2	0	0.000	0	0
Luke Walker	39	8	0	0.000	0	0
Team totals	163	5,569	1,404	0.252	80	538

Pitching

Note: G = Games pitched; IP = Innings pitched; W = Wins; L = Losses; ERA = Earned run average; SO = Strikeouts

Regular Season
Player	G	IP	W	L	ERA	SO
Ron Kline	56	112 2/3	12	5	1.68	48
Luke Walker	39	61 2/3	0	3	2.04	66
Bob Veale	36	245 1/3	13	14	2.05	171
Bruce Dal Canton	7	17	1	1	2.12	8
Steve Blass	33	220 1/3	18	6	2.12	132
Dock Ellis	26	104	6	5	2.51	52
Roy Face	43	52	2	4	2.60	34
Bob Moose	38	171 1/3	8	12	2.73	126
Juan Pizarro	12	11	1	1	3.27	6
Tommie Sisk	33	96	5	5	3.28	41
Dave Wickersham	11	20 2/3	1	0	3.48	9
Al McBean	36	198 1/3	9	12	3.58	100
Jim Bunning	27	160	4	14	3.88	95
Bill Henry	10	16 2/3	0	0	8.10	9
Team totals	163	1,487 1/3	80	82	2.74	897

== Farm system ==
Level	Team	League	Manager
AAA	Columbus Jets	International League	Johnny Pesky
AA	York Pirates	Eastern League	Joe Morgan
A	Salem Rebels	Carolina League	Don Hoak
A	Clinton Pilots	Midwest League	Bob Clear
A	Gastonia Pirates	Western Carolinas League	Frank Oceak
Rookie	GCL Pirates	Gulf Coast League	Buddy Pritchard
