= Bill Henry (baseball, born 1927) =

American baseball player (1927–2014)

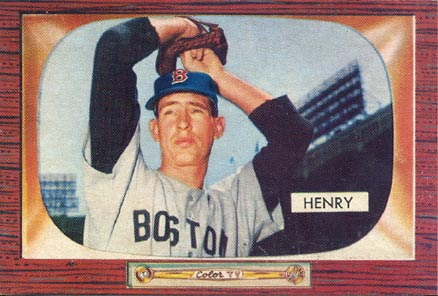
- Pitcher
- Born: October 15, 1927; Alice, Texas, U.S.
- Died: April 11, 2014 (aged 86); Round Rock, Texas, U.S.
- Batted: Left Threw: Left

MLB debut
- April 17, 1952, for the Boston Red Sox

Last MLB appearance
- June 16, 1969, for the Houston Astros

MLB statistics
- Win–loss record: 46–50
- Earned run average: 3.26
- Strikeouts: 621
- Saves: 90
- Stats at Baseball Reference

Teams
- Boston Red Sox (1952–1955); Chicago Cubs (1958–1959); Cincinnati Reds (1960–1965); San Francisco Giants (1965–1968); Pittsburgh Pirates (1968); Houston Astros (1969)

Career highlights and awards
- All-Star (1960²)

William Rodman Henry (October 15, 1927 – April 11, 2014) was an American professional baseball player. A left-handed pitcher, he appeared in Major League Baseball between 1952 and 1969 for the Boston Red Sox, Chicago Cubs, Cincinnati Reds, San Francisco Giants, Pittsburgh Pirates, and Houston Astros. Henry was nicknamed "Gabby" by teammates for his quiet nature. While with the Cincinnati Reds, he pitched in an All-Star Game and two World Series games, and in 1964 had an 0.87 earned run average. His 1964 season has been described as being "on the short list of the great relief seasons of all time".

== Early life ==
Henry was born on October 15, 1927, in Alice, Texas. Henry excelled at basketball for Pasadena High School, in Pasadena, Texas, playing guard. He was selected to the Class A All-State team in 1946. As a senior in 1946, he led the basketball team to the Class A Texas state high school championship, the first one in Pasadena Independent School District (ISD) history. The team was considered the strongest Class A team ever at the time. They defeated Levelland in the championship game, 50–35, with Henry scoring 22 points. In 2012, he was inducted into the Pasadena ISD Athletics Hall of Fame.

Henry also excelled in track at Pasadena High. However, he had no opportunity to play high school baseball as Pasadena did not have a baseball team.

Henry went to the University of Houston for one year. He played as a member of the Houston Cougars 1946-47 basketball team. It also has been stated that he excelled on the school's newly formed baseball team.

On the other hand, it has also been reported that Henry did not play organized baseball until reaching the minor leagues in 1948. Rather, Henry pitched for a Pasadena softball team, and was considered one of the best softball pitchers in Harris County, Texas, where he had been pitching softball for three years. In 1947, he was signed to a professional baseball contract by Detroit Tigers' scout Chet Morgan, via Morgan's brother, even though Henry had never actually pitched in organized baseball. Morgan's brother was the minister who had baptized Henry, and pastor of the church for which Henry pitched, and believed Henry's exceptional softball skill meant he could succeed in baseball as well. It is also reported that Chet Morgan came to see Henry pitch softball on Pastor Morgan's strong recommendation, and that Chet Morgan himself signed Henry to play for the Clarksdale (Mississippi) Planters. The advent of his professional baseball career ended his time at the University of Houston.

== Minor league baseball and Boston Red Sox ==
In 1948, the left-handed pitching Henry played for Clarksdale of the Class C Cotton State League, which Chet Morgan managed. He had a 6–9 win–loss record, 4.58 earned run average (ERA) and 83 strikeouts in 118 innings pitched. It has been reported that the first game Henry pitched for Clarksdale was "his first bona fide baseball game". He pitched for Clarksdale again in 1949, going 14–14, with an improved 3.23 ERA, and 192 strikeouts in 195 innings.

In 1950, without Morgan's knowledge, the Planters owners sold Henry's rights to the Shreveport Sports at least in part to cover a debt owed to Shreveport; infuriating Morgan who was working to get a deal for Henry with the Boston Braves. Henry pitched in one game for the Double-A Shreveport Sports that year, but played the majority of his games for the Class B Greenville Majors of the Big State League, where he went 11–7, with a 3.29 ERA, two shutouts and 137 strikeouts in 164 innings. In 1951, he played a full season in Shreveport, going 12–15, with a 4.44 ERA, starting in 33 games.

The Boston Red Sox bought his contract after the 1951 season. Henry made the 1952 Red Sox spring training roster. He began the 1952 season playing for the Red Sox, winning his first five games. However, he subsequently lost four games and was demoted to the San Diego Padres of the Pacific Coast League, after pitching 13 games for the Red Sox (10 as a starter). Henry was a good fastball pitcher, but the lack of a curveball was the reason for his demotion. In San Diego, he went 7–9 in 16 starts (pitching one game in relief), with a 3.59 ERA.

He began the 1953 season with the Triple-A Louisville Colonels, where the instructional staff worked on helping Henry develop his curve ball. In 1953 with the Colonels, he was 7–3, with a 3.56 ERA as a starting pitcher. He was called up to the Red Sox on July 4, and finished out the season in Boston. He appeared in 21 games, starting 12, with a 5–5 record and 3.26 ERA. He started the 1954 season with the Red Sox, going 3–7 with a 4.52 ERA, starting 13 of 24 games in which he appeared. He also pitched eight games for the Double-A Charleston Senators, with a 2–2 record.

Henry spent the 1955 season with the Red Sox, but only pitched in 17 games, with seven starts. He was 2–4, with a 3.32 ERA. In early April 1956, the Red Sox sold his contract rights to the San Francisco Seals of the Pacific Coast League. The 28-year old Henry played the entire 1956 season with the Seals. In January 1957, the Red Sox traded him to the Chicago Cubs for Frank Kellert and cash. He was assigned to the Double-A Memphis Chickasaws and had his best season to date in 1957, with a 14–6 record in 28 starts, and 3.39 ERA.

He began the 1958 season with the Portland Beavers of the Pacific Coast League, going 5–3 with a 3.60 ERA, but was converted from a starting pitcher to a relief pitcher.

== Major league baseball (1958-69) ==
=== Chicago Cubs ===
Henry was called up to the Cubs and pitched his first Major League game since 1955, on June 14, 1958, earning a win in relief of starter John Briggs. Henry would only start in two more games over the remaining 12 years of his career. Henry finished the 1958 Cubs season with 5–4 record, six saves and a 2.88 ERA in 44 relief appearances. In 1959, he tied with teammate Don Elston in leading the National League in games pitched (65). He was 9–8 with 12 saves and a 2.68 ERA; and had 115 strikeouts in 134.1 innings pitched. He walked only 29 batters (three intentionally), and had a 4.42 strikeout-to-walk ratio. Hall of Fame pitcher Robin Roberts led starting pitchers that year in strikeout-to-walk ratio at 3.914.

=== Cincinnati Reds ===
After the 1959 season ended, the Cubs traded Henry, Lee Walls and Lou Jackson to the Cincinnati Reds for Frank Thomas. In his first season with the Reds, Henry was the Reds closer, pitching 51 games in relief. He had 17 saves, a 1–5 record and 3.19 ERA. Henry was selected to play in both 1960 All-Star Games; pitching one inning in the second game on July 13, 1960.

The Reds won the National League pennant in 1961. Henry pitched 47 games in relief, finishing 32 with 16 saves, tied with teammate Jim Brosnan for second best in the National League. He had a 2–1 record and a team best 2.19 ERA. The Reds lost to the Yankees four games to one in the 1961 World Series. Henry pitched in two games, giving up five earned runs in 2.1 innings pitched. He pitched in Games 4 and 5, with the five runs against him all coming in Game 5. In Game 4, Henry pitched in the top of the 9th inning, retiring all three batters he faced. He struck out Tony Kubek and Roger Maris, and got Hector Lopez out on a fly ball.

Henry had 11 saves in 1962 and 14 in 1963, but with ERAs of 4.58 and 4.15 respectively. In 1964, Henry had a phenomenally low 0.87 ERA in 52 innings pitched, with a 2–2 record and six saves. His 1964 season has been described as "on the short list of the great relief seasons of all time".

In early May 1965, the Reds traded the 37-year old Henry to the San Francisco Giants for left-handed pitcher Jim Duffalo. He was 2–0 in three relief appearances at the time.

=== San Francisco Giants ===
He had 35 relief appearances for the Giants in 1965, going 2–2 with four saves and a 3.64 ERA. He pitched 22 innings in 35 games the following season (1966), with a 2.45 ERA. Henry was released by the Giants after the 1966 season, but they resigned him before the start of the 1967 season. Henry started the penultimate game of the 1967 season for the Giants, in the second game of a doubleheader against the Philadelphia Phillies. This was his first Major League start since 1955, though he pitched only three innings, combining on a four-hit shutout with Néstor Chávez and Lindy McDaniel. Overall in 1967, he was 2–0 with a 2.08 ERA and two saves in 21.2 innings.

=== Finals years ===
After pitching only five innings for the Giants in 1968, they sold Henry's contract rights to the Pittsburgh Pirates in late June. He pitched only 16.2 innings for the Pirates before being released on August 19. The Houston Astros signed the 41-year old Henry in late May 1969. Less than one month later, Henry was released by the Astros on June 28, 1969, ending his Major League career.

=== Career ===
Over his Major League career, Henry pitched in 527 games, all but 44 as a relief pitcher. He had a 46–50 record, 90 saves, and a 3.26 ERA in 913 innings pitched.

Henry has been stated to be the first person from the University of Houston's baseball history to make it to the Major Leagues. However, other reporting states he did not play organized baseball until he reached the minor leagues in 1948; and the Baseball Almanac does not include Henry on its list of University of Houston Cougars alumni who played Major League Baseball.

== Personal life ==
Henry was known for his humility, faith, integrity, low-key lifestyle and focus on his family during his playing years and after. After retiring from baseball, Henry worked for the Houston Boatmen, International Longshoremen's Association (ILA) Local #1438, in Houston's shipyards. He resided in Granite Shoals and Deer Park, Texas, near Houston.

During the offseason early in his minor league career, Henry played amateur basketball to stay in shape. In the early 1950s he worked for Continental Can, and played on its basketball team in the Longhorn League.

Henry was a victim of identity theft, to an unrelated man also called Bill Henry, who lived in Lakeland, Florida. The Florida Bill Henry apparently told his own third wife (for 20 years) and many Florida neighbors and friends, including his pastor, that he was Bill Henry the major leaguer. If questioned by others about his date and place of birth being different from those given for Bill Henry the baseball player, the faux Bill Henry would say this was done to deceive scouts into thinking he was younger than his actual age. The two also had enough similarity of appearance that baseball cards did not give away the deception. When the imposter died in August 2007 at the age of 83, multiple media outlets erroneously reported that Henry (the baseball player) had died. At the time, however, the real pitcher Bill Henry was 79 years old, and living in Texas.

Henry was contacted by baseball historian David Allen Lambert, a member of the Society for American Baseball Research, who first told Henry of his falsely reported death. Lambert called Henry in Texas after realizing there were discrepancies between the obituary and known facts about Henry, and spoke to his wife, offering condolences after hearing Henry had died. She responded, "'I hope he didn’t. He’s sitting right next to me.'" After speaking to Lambert himself, Henry told Lambert, "'tell everybody back in Boston that I’m still kicking.'" Lambert then made the effort to have media outlets retract the misleading obituaries. The story and Lambert's role in it appeared in Sports Illustrated in Rick Reilly's "Life of Reilly" column, entitled "The Passage of a Counterfeit Bill".

Henry suffered no personal loss from the identity theft and bore no grudges, saying "'It doesn't bother me at all". Florida Bill Henry's friends likewise were not disturbed when they found out the truth, and it did not diminish their feelings or perceptions of their friend as a good person. Henry himself called the Florida Bill Henry's widow, to let her know everything would be alright.

== Death ==
Henry died as a result of heart problems at the age of 86 on April 11, 2014, in Round Rock, Texas. He was survived by his wife of 69 years, Betty Lou Sabo-Henry, four sons, and four grandchildren.
