= Dave Bristol =

American baseball player and manager (born 1933)

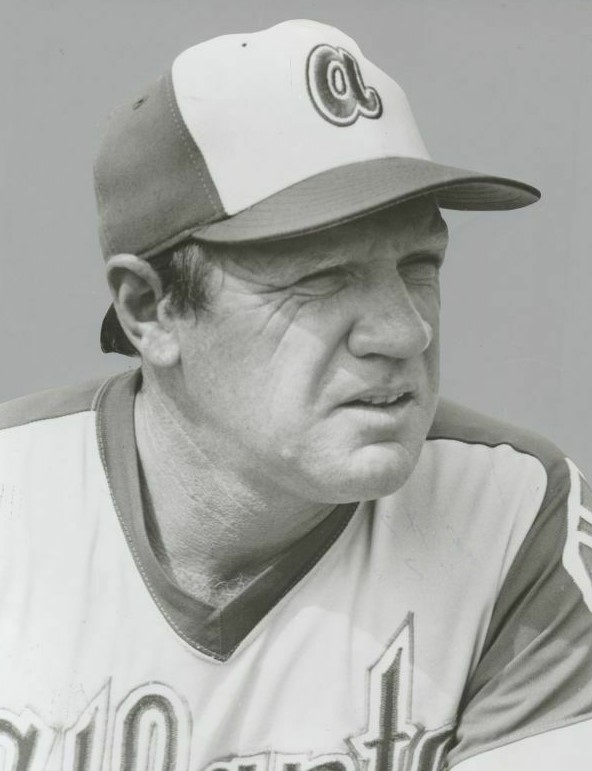
- Manager
- Born: June 23, 1933 (age 93); Macon, Georgia, U.S.
- Bats: Right Throws: Right

Career statistics
- Games managed: 1,424
- Win–loss record: 657–764
- Winning %: .462
- Stats at Baseball Reference

Teams
- As manager: Cincinnati Reds (1966–1969); Milwaukee Brewers (1970–1972); Atlanta Braves (1976–1977); San Francisco Giants (1979–1980); As coach: Cincinnati Reds (1966); Montreal Expos (1973–1975); San Francisco Giants (1978–1979); Philadelphia Phillies (1982–1985, 1988); Cincinnati Reds (1989, 1993)

Career highlights and awards
- Cincinnati Reds Hall of Fame

James David Bristol (born June 23, 1933) is an American former professional baseball player, coach and manager. He played in minor league baseball as a second baseman from 1951 to 1961 before going on to become a manager in Major League Baseball (MLB) for the Cincinnati Reds, Milwaukee Brewers, Atlanta Braves, and San Francisco Giants. He also served as a coach for the Philadelphia Phillies and Montreal Expos. His career as a coach and manager in professional baseball spanned 44 years. As a manager, Bristol played an integral role in the development of the Cincinnati Reds dynasty known as the Big Red Machine. He was inducted into the Cincinnati Reds Hall of Fame in 2018.

== Success in the minors, and with the Reds ==
Bristol attended high school at the Baylor School in Chattanooga, Tennessee. He went on to University of North Carolina at Chapel Hill and Western Carolina University. Bristol worked as an assistant football coach at Murphy High School in Cherokee County, North Carolina. A right-handed hitting and throwing infielder, he never played in the Major Leagues. Bristol became a playing manager in the Cincinnati farm system at the age of 24 with the Hornell Redlegs of the Class D New York–Penn League in 1957. By 1964, he was managing the Reds' top farm team, the San Diego Padres of the Pacific Coast League, where, at age 31, he won a pennant and playoff title—the fifth league championship of his eight-year career to date. In nine seasons (1957–65) as a minor league pilot, his teams won 652 games and lost 562 (.537).

In 1966, Bristol was named to the Reds' coaching staff, and when the team performed badly under rookie skipper Don Heffner, Bristol took over the club as manager on July 13. Bristol guided the Reds through three winning seasons, but he was dismissed following the 1969 campaign. Sparky Anderson, who took over, would go into the Baseball Hall of Fame as the leader of the "Big Red Machine".

Cincinnati (298–265, .529) represented the high-water mark of Bristol's managing career. He never managed another winning club.

== Later struggles ==
Not long after being fired by the Reds, Bristol was hired by the Seattle Pilots as the second manager in their history. He walked into a very difficult situation; the Pilots were on the verge of bankruptcy, and went to spring training not knowing whether they would play in Seattle or Milwaukee in 1970. Just six days before Opening Day, the Pilots got word they would be moving to Milwaukee as the Brewers. The Brewers under Bristol were never able to put together a winning team; he was fired 30 games into the 1972 season.

In 1976, Bristol was hired as manager of the Atlanta Braves. Midway through the 1977 season, with the Braves mired in a 16-game losing streak, owner Ted Turner sent Bristol on a 10-day "scouting trip" and took over as his own manager on an interim basis. This only lasted for one game (a 2–1 loss to the Pittsburgh Pirates) before National League president Chub Feeney ordered Turner to give up the reins, citing major league rules which forbid managers or players from owning stock in a team. After the Braves broke the streak with third-base coach Vern Benson as interim manager, Bristol was brought back to finish out what was at the time the worst season in the Atlanta portion of Braves history. He was fired at the end of the season. He last managed in MLB with the San Francisco Giants late in the 1979 season and all of 1980 before he was replaced by Frank Robinson. In June 1980, Bristol got into a fight with Giants pitcher John Montefusco after a victory over the rival Los Angeles Dodgers. Montefusco was angry at Bristol for removing him from the game too early. Bristol finished with a career managerial record of 657 win and 764 defeats (.462).

In addition to his first MLB season with Cincinnati as a coach, Bristol also served as the third base coach for the Montreal Expos (1973–75) and the San Francisco Giants (1978–79), plus two terms with the Philadelphia Phillies (1982–85; 1988), and two additional stints with the Reds (1989; 1993).

In 2018, Bristol was inducted into the Cincinnati Reds Hall of Fame.

== Post-MLB career ==
After retiring from professional baseball, Bristol returned to live in his beloved Blue Ridge Mountains in Andrews, North Carolina. Bristol was encouraged to help nearby Young Harris College's baseball program by Georgia Governor Zell Miller, who was a YHC baseball player and alumnus of the class of 1951. Bristol began helping the YHC Mountain Lion baseball team and has served as an on-field mentor to YHC's baseball players and coaches. Because of his generous efforts and support he was inducted into the Young Harris College Athletics Hall of Fame in 2021.

== Managerial record ==
Team	Year	Regular season					Postseason			
Team	Year	Games	Won	Lost	Win %	Finish	Won	Lost	Win %	Result
CIN	1966	77	39	38	.506	7th in NL	–	–	–	–
CIN	1967	162	87	75	.537	4th in NL	–	–	–	–
CIN	1968	163	83	79	.512	4th in NL	–	–	–	–
CIN	1969	163	89	73	.549	3rd in NL West	–	–	–	–
CIN total		565	298	265	.529		–	–	–	–
MIL	1970	163	65	97	.401	5th in AL West	–	–	–	–
MIL	1971	161	69	92	.429	6th in AL West	–	–	–	–
MIL	1972	30	10	20	.333	(fired)	–	–	–	–
MIL total		354	144	209	.408		–	–	–	–
ATL	1976	162	70	92	.432	6th in NL West	–	–	–	–
ATL	1977	29	8	21	.276	(vacation)	–	–	–	–
ATL	1977	131	52	79	.397	6th in NL West	–	–	–	–
ATL total		322	130	192	.404		–	–	–	–
SF	1979	22	10	22	.313	4th in NL West	–	–	–	–
SF	1980	161	75	86	.466	5th in NL West	–	–	–	–
SF total		183	85	98	.464		–	–	–	–
Total		1,424	657	764	.462		–	–	–	–

Preceded by first manager	Hornell Redlegs manager 1957	Succeeded by last manager
Preceded by first manager	Geneva Redlegs Manager; 1958	Succeeded by Reno DeBenedetti
Preceded by Larry Taylor	Geneva Redlegs Manager; 1959	Succeeded by last manager
Preceded by Tony Pacheco	Palatka Redlegs Manager; 1960	Succeeded by Mike Fandozzi
Preceded by Johnny Vander Meer	Topeka Redlegs Manager; 1961	Succeeded by last manager
Preceded by Jerry Snyder	Macon Peaches Manager; 1962–1963	Succeeded by Red Davis
Preceded by Don Heffner	San Diego Padres (PCL) Manager; 1964–1965	Succeeded by Frank Lucchesi
Preceded by Frank Oceak; Bruce Kimm; Sam Perlozzo	Cincinnati Reds 3rd base coach 1966; 1989; 1993	Succeeded by Vern Benson; Sam Perlozzo; Bobby Valentine
Preceded by Jim Bragan	Montreal Expos 3rd base coach 1973–1975	Succeeded by Ozzie Virgil, Sr.
Preceded by Lee Elia	Philadelphia Phillies 3rd base coach 1982–1985	Succeeded by Lee Elia
