= Mike Page =

American baseball player (1940–2021)

- Outfielder
- Born: July 12, 1940; Woodruff, South Carolina, U.S.
- Died: December 4, 2021 (aged 81)
- Batted: Left Threw: Right

MLB debut
- June 30, 1968, for the Atlanta Braves

Last MLB appearance
- August 24, 1968, for the Atlanta Braves

MLB statistics
- Batting average: .179
- Home runs: 0
- Runs batted in: 1
- Stats at Baseball Reference

Teams
- Atlanta Braves (1968)

Michael Randy Page (July 12, 1940 – December 4, 2021) was an American Major League Baseball outfielder. He played 20 games for the Atlanta Braves in 1968, mostly as a pinch hitter.

== Sources ==
- Career statistics from Baseball Reference · Baseball Reference (Minors) · Retrosheet · Baseball Almanac
