= 1968 Cincinnati Reds season =

1968 Cincinnati Reds
- League: National League
- Ballpark: Crosley Field
- City: Cincinnati
- Record: 83–79 (.512)
- League place: 4th
- Owners: Francis Dale
- General managers: Bob Howsam
- Managers: Dave Bristol
- Television: WLW (Ed Kennedy, Frank McCormick)
- Radio: WCKY (Jim McIntyre, Joe Nuxhall)

The 1968 Cincinnati Reds season was the 99th season for the franchise in Major League Baseball. The Reds finished in fourth in the National League, with a record of 83–79, 14 games behind the St. Louis Cardinals. The Reds were managed by Dave Bristol and played their home games at Crosley Field. The team had 5,767 at bats, a single season National League record. The Reds as a team led all of MLB this season in runs scored (690) and in batting average (.273).

== Offseason ==
- November 28, 1967: Clyde Mashore was drafted from the Reds by the New York Mets in the 1967 rule 5 draft.
- November 29, 1967: Sammy Ellis was traded by the Reds to the California Angels for Bill Kelso and Jorge Rubio.
- January 27, 1968: Chris Chambliss was drafted by the Reds in the 2nd round of the secondary phase of the 1968 Major League Baseball draft, but did not sign.
- February 8, 1968: Johnny Edwards was traded by the Reds to the St. Louis Cardinals for Jimy Williams and Pat Corrales.
- March 28, 1968: Clyde Mashore was returned to the Reds by the New York Mets.

== Regular season ==
Catcher Johnny Bench won the NL's Rookie of the Year Award.

=== Season standings ===
National League
Team	W	L	Pct.	GB	Home	Road
St. Louis Cardinals	97	65	.599	—	47‍–‍34	50‍–‍31
San Francisco Giants	88	74	.543	9	42‍–‍39	46‍–‍35
Chicago Cubs	84	78	.519	13	47‍–‍34	37‍–‍44
Cincinnati Reds	83	79	.512	14	40‍–‍41	43‍–‍38
Atlanta Braves	81	81	.500	16	41‍–‍40	40‍–‍41
Pittsburgh Pirates	80	82	.494	17	40‍–‍41	40‍–‍41
Los Angeles Dodgers	76	86	.469	21	41‍–‍40	35‍–‍46
Philadelphia Phillies	76	86	.469	21	38‍–‍43	38‍–‍43
New York Mets	73	89	.451	24	32‍–‍49	41‍–‍40
Houston Astros	72	90	.444	25	42‍–‍39	30‍–‍51

=== Record vs. opponents ===
1968 National League record Sources:
Team	ATL	CHC	CIN	HOU	LAD	NYM	PHI	PIT	SF	STL
Atlanta	—	8–10	10–8	11–7	9–9	12–6–1	11–7	6–12	9–9	5–13
Chicago	10–8	—	7–11	10–8	12–6	8–10	9–9	10–8	9–9–1	9–9
Cincinnati	8–10	11–7	—	9–9	9–9	10–8	11–7	10–8–1	8–10	7–11
Houston	7–11	8–10	9–9	—	11–7	10–8	9–9	5–13	8–10	5–13
Los Angeles	9–9	6–12	9–9	7–11	—	7–11	10–8	10–8	9–9	9–9
New York	6–12–1	10–8	8–10	8–10	11–7	—	8–10	9–9	7–11	6–12
Philadelphia	7–11	9–9	7–11	9–9	8–10	10–8	—	9–9	9–9	8–10
Pittsburgh	12–6	8–10	8–10–1	13–5	8–10	9–9	9–9	—	7–11	6–12
San Francisco	9–9	9–9–1	10–8	10–8	9–9	11–7	9–9	11–7	—	10–8
St. Louis	13–5	9–9	11–7	13–5	9–9	12–6	10–8	12–6	8–10	—

=== Roster ===
1968 Cincinnati Reds
Roster
Pitchers: 33 Ted Abernathy; 35 Gerry Arrigo; 36 Clay Carroll; 40 Tony Cloninger; 39 George Culver; 56 Ted Davidson; 26 Bill Kelso; 48 Bob Lee; 46 Jim Maloney; 42 Billy McCool; 31 Dan McGinn; 38 Gary Nolan; 32 Milt Pappas; 22 Mel Queen; 30 Jay Ritchie; 37 John Tsitouris	Catchers: 5 Johnny Bench; 7 Pat Corrales; 25 Jimmie Schaffer; Infielders: 16 Leo Cárdenas; 19 Tommy Helms; 6 Bob Johnson; 23 Lee May; 11 Hal McRae; 8 Don Pavletich; 24 Tony Pérez; 15 Chico Ruiz; 17 Fred Whitfield; 6 Woody Woodward	Outfielders: 55 Jim Beauchamp; 29 Alex Johnson; 12 Mack Jones; 28 Vada Pinson; 14 Pete Rose	Manager: 4 Dave Bristol; Coaches: 10 Vern Benson (Third base); 2 Jim Bragan (First base); 3 Mel Harder (Pitching); 9 Hal Smith (Bullpen)

== Player stats ==
= Indicates team leader

= Indicates league leader

=== Batting ===
==== Starters by position ====
Note: Pos = Position; G = Games played; AB = At bats; H = Hits; R = Runs; Avg. = Batting average; HR = Home runs; RBI = Runs batted in

Pos	Player	G	AB	R	H	Avg.	HR	RBI
C	Johnny Bench	154	564	67	155	.275	15	82
1B	Lee May	146	559	78	162	.290	22	80
2B	Tommy Helms	127	507	35	146	.288	2	47
SS	Leo Cárdenas	137	452	45	106	.235	7	41
3B	Tony Pérez	160	625	93	176	.282	18	92
LF	Alex Johnson	149	603	79	188	.312	2	58
CF	Vada Pinson	130	499	60	135	.271	5	48
RF	Pete Rose	149	626	94	210	.335	10	49

==== Other batters ====
Note: G = Games played; AB = At bats; H = Hits; Avg. = Batting average; HR = Home runs; RBI = Runs batted in

Player	G	AB	H	Avg.	HR	RBI
Mack Jones	103	234	59	.252	10	34
Fred Whitfield	87	171	44	.257	6	32
Chico Ruiz	85	139	36	.259	0	9
Woody Woodward	56	119	29	.244	0	10
Don Pavletich	46	98	28	.286	2	11
Jim Beauchamp	31	57	15	.263	2	14
Pat Corrales	20	56	15	.268	0	6
Hal McRae	17	51	10	.196	0	2
Bob Johnson	16	15	4	.267	0	1
Jimmie Schaffer	4	6	1	.167	0	1

=== Pitching ===
==== Starting pitchers ====
Note: G = Games pitched; IP = Innings pitched; W = Wins; L = Losses; ERA = Earned run average; SO = Strikeouts

Player	G	IP	W	L	ERA	SO
George Culver	42	226.0	11	16	3.23	114
Jim Maloney	33	207.0	16	10	3.61	181
Gerry Arrigo	36	205.1	12	10	3.33	140
Gary Nolan	23	150.0	9	4	2.40	111
Tony Cloninger	17	91.1	4	3	4.04	65
Mel Queen	5	18.1	0	1	5.89	20
John Tsitouris	3	12.2	0	3	7.11	6

==== Other pitchers ====
Note: G = Games pitched; IP = Innings pitched; W = Wins; L = Losses; ERA = Earned run average; SO = Strikeouts

Player	G	IP	W	L	ERA	SO
Milt Pappas	15	62.2	2	5	5.60	43

==== Relief pitchers ====
Note: G = Games pitched; W = Wins; L = Losses; SV = Saves; ERA = Earned run average; SO = Strikeouts

Player	G	W	L	SV	ERA	SO
Clay Carroll	58	7	7	17	2.29	61
Ted Abernathy	78	10	7	13	2.46	64
Bob Lee	44	2	4	3	5.15	34
Bill Kelso	35	4	1	1	4.00	39
Billy McCool	30	3	4	2	4.97	30
Jay Ritchie	28	2	3	0	4.61	32
Ted Davidson	23	1	0	0	6.23	7
Dan McGinn	14	0	1	0	5.25	16

== Awards and honors ==
- Pete Rose, Hutch Award

== Farm system ==
Level	Team	League	Manager
AAA	Indianapolis Indians	Pacific Coast League	Don Zimmer
AA	Asheville Tourists	Southern League	Sparky Anderson
A	Tampa Tarpons	Florida State League	George Scherger
A-Short Season	Sioux Falls Packers	Northern League	Jim Snyder
Rookie	GCL Reds	Gulf Coast League	Bill Lajoie

LEAGUE CHAMPIONS: Asheville
