= 1968 Los Angeles Dodgers season =

1968 Los Angeles Dodgers
- League: National League
- Ballpark: Dodger Stadium
- City: Los Angeles, California
- Record: 73–89 (.469)
- Divisional place: 7th
- Owners: Walter O'Malley, James & Dearie Mulvey
- President: Walter O'Malley
- General managers: Buzzie Bavasi, Fresco Thompson
- Managers: Walter Alston
- Television: KTTV (11)
- Radio: KFI; Vin Scully, Jerry Doggett; KWKW; José García, Jaime Jarrín

The 1968 Los Angeles Dodgers season was the 79th season for the Los Angeles Dodgers franchise in Major League Baseball (MLB), their 11th season in Los Angeles, California, and their 7th season playing their home games at Dodger Stadium in Los Angeles California. They improved upon their 73–89 record from 1967 to a 76–86 record and finished in seventh place in the National League standings, 21 games behind the St. Louis Cardinals. After the season, the Dodgers underwent some changes among the team management when long time general manager Buzzie Bavasi resigned to take over the expansion San Diego Padres. He was replaced by team vice-president Fresco Thompson. However, Thompson was diagnosed with cancer weeks after taking the job and died in November. Al Campanis became the new general manager for the following season.

== Offseason ==
- November 28, 1967: John Roseboro, Ron Perranoski and Bob Miller were traded by the Dodgers to the Minnesota Twins for Mudcat Grant and Zoilo Versalles.
- November 30, 1967: Gene Michael was purchased from the Dodgers by the New York Yankees.
- November 30, 1967: Lou Johnson was traded by the Dodgers to the Chicago Cubs for Paul Popovich.
- February 13, 1968: Ron Hunt and Nate Oliver were traded by the Dodgers to the San Francisco Giants for Tom Haller and Frank Kasheta (minors).
- March 26, 1968: Rocky Colavito was purchased by the Dodgers from the Chicago White Sox.

== Regular season ==
=== Season standings ===
National League
Team	W	L	Pct.	GB	Home	Road
St. Louis Cardinals	97	65	.599	—	47‍–‍34	50‍–‍31
San Francisco Giants	88	74	.543	9	42‍–‍39	46‍–‍35
Chicago Cubs	84	78	.519	13	47‍–‍34	37‍–‍44
Cincinnati Reds	83	79	.512	14	40‍–‍41	43‍–‍38
Atlanta Braves	81	81	.500	16	41‍–‍40	40‍–‍41
Pittsburgh Pirates	80	82	.494	17	40‍–‍41	40‍–‍41
Los Angeles Dodgers	76	86	.469	21	41‍–‍40	35‍–‍46
Philadelphia Phillies	76	86	.469	21	38‍–‍43	38‍–‍43
New York Mets	73	89	.451	24	32‍–‍49	41‍–‍40
Houston Astros	72	90	.444	25	42‍–‍39	30‍–‍51

=== Record vs. opponents ===
1968 National League record Sources:
Team	ATL	CHC	CIN	HOU	LAD	NYM	PHI	PIT	SF	STL
Atlanta	—	8–10	10–8	11–7	9–9	12–6–1	11–7	6–12	9–9	5–13
Chicago	10–8	—	7–11	10–8	12–6	8–10	9–9	10–8	9–9–1	9–9
Cincinnati	8–10	11–7	—	9–9	9–9	10–8	11–7	10–8–1	8–10	7–11
Houston	7–11	8–10	9–9	—	11–7	10–8	9–9	5–13	8–10	5–13
Los Angeles	9–9	6–12	9–9	7–11	—	7–11	10–8	10–8	9–9	9–9
New York	6–12–1	10–8	8–10	8–10	11–7	—	8–10	9–9	7–11	6–12
Philadelphia	7–11	9–9	7–11	9–9	8–10	10–8	—	9–9	9–9	8–10
Pittsburgh	12–6	8–10	8–10–1	13–5	8–10	9–9	9–9	—	7–11	6–12
San Francisco	9–9	9–9–1	10–8	10–8	9–9	11–7	9–9	11–7	—	10–8
St. Louis	13–5	9–9	11–7	13–5	9–9	12–6	10–8	12–6	8–10	—

=== Opening Day lineup ===
Opening Day starters
Name	Position
Willie Davis	Center fielder
Zoilo Versalles	Shortstop
Wes Parker	First baseman
Al Ferrara	Left fielder
Bob Bailey	Third baseman
Ron Fairly	Right fielder
Paul Popovich	Second baseman
Tom Haller	Catcher
Claude Osteen	Starting pitcher

=== Notable transactions ===
- April 3, 1968: Hank Aguirre was acquired by the Dodgers from the Detroit Tigers for cash and a player to be named later. The Tigers completed the deal by sending Fred Moulder (minors) to the Dodgers on April 4.
- April 23, 1968: Jim Hickman and Phil Regan were traded by the Dodgers to the Chicago Cubs for Ted Savage and Jim Ellis.
- July 11, 1968: Rocky Colavito was released by the Dodgers.

=== Roster ===
1968 Los Angeles Dodgers
Roster
Pitchers: 17 Hank Aguirre; 38 Jack Billingham; 21 Jim Brewer; 53 Don Drysdale; 44 Alan Foster; 22 Mudcat Grant; 37 Mike Kekich; 27 Joe Moeller; 23 Claude Osteen; 35 John Purdin; 27 Phil Regan; 47 Vicente Romo; 40 Bill Singer; 20 Don Sutton	Catchers: 25 Jim Campanis; 15 Tom Haller; 10 Jeff Torborg; Infielders: 34 Luis Alcaraz; 7 Bob Bailey; 45 Ken Boyer; 5 Jim Lefebvre; 28 Wes Parker; 26 Paul Popovich; 11 Bart Shirley; 16 Bill Sudakis; 2 Zoilo Versalles	Outfielders: 16 Rocky Colavito; 43,47 Willie Crawford; 3 Willie Davis; 12 Jim Fairey; 6 Ron Fairly; 9 Al Ferrara; 14 Len Gabrielson; 30 Cleo James; 31 Ted Savage	Manager: 24 Walter Alston; Coaches: 52 Carroll Beringer; 19 Jim Gilliam; 18 Preston Gómez; 8 Danny Ozark; 36 Lefty Phillips

== Player stats ==
=== Batting ===
==== Starters by position ====
Note: Pos = Position; G = Games played; AB = At bats; H = Hits; Avg. = Batting average; HR = Home runs; RBI = Runs batted in

Pos	Player	G	AB	H	Avg.	HR	RBI
C	Tom Haller	144	474	135	.285	4	53
1B	Wes Parker	135	468	112	.239	3	27
2B	Paul Popovich	134	418	97	.232	2	25
SS	Zoilo Versalles	122	403	79	.196	2	24
3B	Bob Bailey	105	322	73	.227	8	39
LF	Len Gabrielson	108	304	82	.270	10	35
CF	Willie Davis	160	643	161	.250	7	31
RF	Ron Fairly	141	441	103	.234	4	43

==== Other batters ====
Note: G = Games played; AB = At bats; H = Hits; Avg. = Batting average; HR = Home runs; RBI = Runs batted in

Player	G	AB	H	Avg.	HR	RBI
Jim Lefebvre	84	286	69	.241	5	31
Ken Boyer	83	221	60	.271	6	41
Willie Crawford	61	175	44	.251	4	14
Jim Fairey	99	156	31	.199	1	10
Ted Savage	61	126	26	.206	2	7
Rocky Colavito	40	113	23	.204	3	11
Luis Alcaraz	41	106	16	.151	2	5
Jeff Torborg	37	93	15	.161	0	4
Bill Sudakis	24	87	24	.276	3	12
Bart Shirley	39	83	15	.181	0	4
Jim Campanis	4	11	1	.091	0	0
Cleo James	10	10	2	.200	0	0
Al Ferrara	2	7	1	.143	0	0

=== Pitching ===
==== Starting pitchers ====
Note: G = Games pitched; IP = Innings pitched; W = Wins; L = Losses; ERA = Earned run average; SO = Strikeouts

Player	G	IP	W	L	ERA	SO
Bill Singer	37	256.1	13	17	2.85	227
Claude Osteen	39	254.0	12	18	3.08	119
Don Drysdale	31	239.0	14	12	2.15	155
Don Sutton	35	207.2	11	15	2.60	162
Mike Kekich	25	115.0	2	10	3.91	84
Joe Moeller	3	16.0	1	1	5.06	11
Alan Foster	3	15.2	1	1	1.72	10

==== Relief pitchers ====
Note: G = Games pitched; W = Wins; L = Losses; SV = Saves; ERA = Earned run average; SO = Strikeouts

Player	G	W	L	SV	ERA	SO
Jim Brewer	54	8	3	15	2.49	75
Jack Billingham	50	3	0	8	2.14	46
Mudcat Grant	37	6	4	3	2.08	35
John Purdin	35	2	3	2	3.07	38
Hank Aguirre	25	1	2	3	0.69	25
Phil Regan	5	2	0	0	3.52	7
Vicente Romo	1	0	0	0	0.00	0

== Awards and honors ==
- Gold Glove Award
  - Wes Parker
- TSN Fireman of the Year Award
  - Phil Regan
- NL Player of the Month
  - Don Drysdale (May 1968)

=== All-Stars ===
- 1968 Major League Baseball All-Star Game
  - Don Drysdale, starter
  - Tom Haller, reserve

== Farm system ==
Level	Team	League	Manager
AAA	Spokane Indians	Pacific Coast League	Roy Hartsfield
AA	Albuquerque Dodgers	Texas League	Roger Craig
A	Bakersfield Dodgers	California League	Don Williams
A	Daytona Beach Dodgers	Florida State League	Bill Berrier
A	Tri-City Atoms	Northwest League	Don LeJohn
Rookie	Ogden Dodgers	Pioneer League	Tommy Lasorda

LEAGUE CHAMPIONS: Tri-City, Ogden

== 1968 Major League Baseball draft ==
This was the fourth year of a Major League Baseball draft. The Dodgers drafted 78 players in the June draft and 23 in the January draft, 15 of them would play in MLB. This was one of the Dodgers most successful drafts in history as they drafted Steve Garvey, Ron Cey, Davey Lopes and Bobby Valentine in this draft.

1968 draft picks

=== January draft ===
Round	Name	Position	School	Signed	Career span	Highest level
1	Larry Hall	1B	Broward Community College	Yes	1968–1969	A
2	Bonnie Smith	C		No		
3	Craig Brown	1B	Chipola College	No		
4	Theodore Rohde	OF	Fresno City College	Yes	1968–1970	A
5	Ronnie Hilton	2B	Gulf Coast Community College	No		
6	Tommy Graham	OF		No		
7	Lynn Morrison	OF	Long Beach City College	No		
8	Gordon Crook	OF	Arizona State University	Yes	1968	A
9	Vernon Price	LHP	Chaffey College	Yes	1968–1970	A
10	Donald Pierce	1B		Yes	1968	A-

==== January secondary phase ====
Round	Name	Position	School	Signed	Career span	Highest level
1	Marv Galliher	INF	San Diego Mesa College	Yes	1968–1976	AAA
2	Davey Lopes	OF	Washburn University	Yes	1968–1987	MLB
3	Steve Moore	OF	Santa Barbara City College	No; Royals – 1969	1969–1971	A
4	Randy Smith	OF	Lincoln Land Community College	Yes	1968–1970	A
5	Geoff Zahn	LHP	University of Michigan	Yes	1968–1985	MLB
6	Davd Grangaard	3B	Arizona State University	No; Astros – 1968	1968–1972	AAA
7	Gregory Wellman	LHP	Palm Beach Community College	Yes	1968–1972	AAA
8	James Loll	INF	Los Angeles Pierce College	No; Royals – 1969	1969	Rookie
9	Thomas Jackson	SS	Citrus College	No		
10	Ed Crosby	2B	Long Beach City College	No; Cardinals – 1969	1969–1979	MLB
11	John Marino	C	Los Angeles Valley College	No		
12	Greogory Smith	RHP	Rio Hondo College	No		
13	William Templeton	RHP		No		

=== June draft ===
Round	Name	Position	School	Signed	Career span	Highest level
1	Bobby Valentine	OF	Rippowan High School	Yes	1968–1979	MLB
2	Bill Buckner	1B	Napa High School	Yes	1968–1990	MLB
3	Sonny Johnson	OF	South Carolina State University	Yes	1968–1972	AAA
4	Mike Pazik	LHP	Lynn English High School	No; Yankees – 1971	1971–1979	MLB
5	Tom Paciorek	OF	University of Houston	Yes	1968–1987	MLB
6	Bob Auger	1B	Putnam High School	No; Cardinals – 1969	1969–1972	A
7	Joseph Barkauskas	C	Piscataway High School	No; Yankees – 1972	1972	AA
8	Joe Ferguson	OF	University of the Pacific	Yes	1968–1983	MLB
9	Doyle Alexander	RHP	Woodlawn High School	Yes	1968–1989	MLB
10	Rich Anderson	RHP	Trumbull High School	No; Pirates – 1972	1972–1976	AAA
11	Robert Baxter	C	Lower Dauphin High School	Yes	1969	Rookie
12	Charles Land	OF	Midwest City High School	No		
13	Tom Pratt	LHP	Righetti High School	No; Royals – 1969	1969–1971	A
14	Frederick Willard	3B		Yes	1968–1969	A
15	Jeff Port	3B	Birmingham High School	No		
16	Artie Brown	RHP	New York University	No; Cardinals – 1969	1969–1971	A
17	Bob Gallagher	OF	Stanford University	Yes	1969–1976	MLB
18	Fred Nelson	2B	Arizona State University	Yes	1968–1970	AA
19	Jeff Stout	SS	La Puente High School	No; Royals – 1969	1969–1973	A
20	Theodore Gilje	LHP	College Park High School	Yes	1968–1973	AAA
21	James Rich	OF	Centennial High School	Yes	1969–1975	AAA
22	Brooks Anderson	OF	Cardinal McCloskey High School	No		
23	Daniel Copeland	OF	West Newton High School	Yes	1968–1969	A
24	Milton Guggia	2B	Santa Maria High School	No		
25	Thomas Sowinski	RHP	St. John's University	Yes	1968–1970	AA
26	Robert Baxter	OF	Southampton High School	No		
27	Albert Strane	SS	Santa Clara University	No; Pilots – 1969	1969	A
28	Alvin Strane	2B	Santa Clara University	Yes	1969	A
29	Bob Wissler	OF	California Polytechnic State University, Pomona	No; Twins – 1969	1969–1972	AAA
30	Roy Nelson	P	Vigor High School	SELECTION VOIDED		
31	Richard Breese	RHP	Port Chester High School	No; Mets – 1969	1969–1971	A
32	Dennis Major	1B	Laney College	No		
33	Michael St. John	RHP	West Valley College	Yes	1968–1970	A
34	Alan Blair	SS	Leeds High School	No		
35	William Estey	SS	University of New Hampshire	Yes	1968–1969	A
36	Roger Wallace	RHP	Englewood Senior High School	Yes	1968–1969	A
37	Danny Nichols	3B	Kansas State University	Yes	1968	Rookie
38	James Curnow	C	Morristown High School	No		
39	Thomas Joyce	SS	Solano Community College	No; Royals – 1969	1969–1974	AAA
40	Jim Mueller	SS	Arkansas State University	No; White Sox – 1969	1969–1972	AA
41	Samuel Pasquatonio	C	Franklin High School	No		
42	Richard Dorsch	RHP	Valparaiso University	Yes	1968–1972	A
43	Peter Brown	RHP	Hayward High School	No		
44	Johnny Rushing	LHP	Tuscaloosa County High School	No		
45	Kenneth Van Bell	RHP	Richmond Hill High School	Yes	1968–1969	
46	Gary Whitmore	LHP	University of New Mexico	No		
47	Gary Weese	RHP	Midwest City High School	No; Indians – 1972	1972–1976	AA
48	John Fargnoci	1B	Bryant High School	No		
49	Edgar Ott	LHP	Rutgers, the State University of New Jersey	Yes	1968	A-
50	Kenneth Plau	RHP	El Camino College	No		
51	Robert Woodruff	OF	Port Chester High School	Yes	1969	A
52	Bob Sheldon	SS	Montebello High School	No; Brewers – 1972	1972–1977	MLB
53	Charles Elwis	LHP	Marshall High School	No; Angels −1969	1969	A
54	Beau Robinson	1B	Central High School	No; Yankees – 1969	1969–1971	A
55	Tod Rush	LHP	Montebello High School	No		
56	Anthony Embessi	RHP	Bristol Jr./Sr. High School	No		
57	Steve Angelo	INF	Montebello High School	No; Expos – 1969	1969–1971	AA
58	Douglas Blake	OF	Hackettstown High School	No		
59	Jeff Paquette	C	Lincoln High School	No		
60	Gary Welch	OF	San Rafael High School	No; Mets – 1970	1970	Rookie
61	Merritt Barnes	SS	University of San Francisco	Yes	1968–1969	Rookie
62	Chester Teklinski	RHP	Tarentum High School	No		
63	Lee Driggers	OF	Colonial High School	Yes	1969	A
64	Jeffrey Burns	C	Rollins College	No; Twins – 1969	1969	A
65	Charles Cochrane	SS	Lincoln High School	Yes	1969	A
66	William Homik	C	University of Southern California	Yes	1968–1971	AAA
67	Charles Calver	RHP	California Polytechnic State University, Pomona	Yes	1968–1969	A-
68	Peter Scarpati	RHP	St. Francis University	Yes	1968–1971	AAA
69	Stephen Krines	3B	Villanova University	Yes	1968–1970	A-
70	John DeBrino	RHP	Notre Dame-Bishop Gibbons High School	No		
71	Carl Amendola	C	Plainedge High School	No		

==== June secondary phase ====
Round	Name	Position	School	Signed	Career span	Highest level
1	Steve Garvey	3B	Michigan State University	Yes	1968–1987	MLB
2	Sandy Vance	RHP	Stanford University	Yes	1968–1973	MLB
3	Ron Cey	3B	Washington State University	Yes	1968–1987	MLB
4	Bruce Kinder	SS	Florida Southern College	No; Pilots – 1969	1969–1970	A
5	Bill Seinsoth	1B	University of Southern California	No; Dodgers – 1969	1969	A
6	Ellsworth Jones	LHP	New York University	No		
7	Bob Randall	SS	Kansas State University	No; Dodgers – 1969	1969–1980	MLB
