= Vic LaRose =

American baseball player (1944–2011)

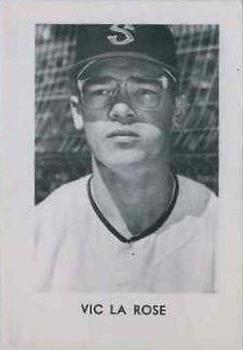
- Shortstop / Second baseman
- Born: December 23, 1944; Los Angeles, California, U.S.
- Died: October 13, 2011 (aged 66); Phoenix, Arizona, U.S.
- Batted: Right Threw: Right

MLB debut
- September 13, 1968, for the Chicago Cubs

Last MLB appearance
- September 25, 1968, for the Chicago Cubs

MLB statistics
- Batting average: .000
- Games played: 4
- At bats: 2
- Stats at Baseball Reference

Teams
- Chicago Cubs (1968)

Victor Raymond LaRose (December 23, 1944 – October 13, 2011) was an American professional baseball player. LaRose was a shortstop and second baseman who played for eight years (1963–1970) in minor league baseball and had a four-game Major League trial with the 1968 Chicago Cubs. He batted and threw right-handed, stood 5 feet 11 inches (1.80 m) tall and weighed 180 pounds (82 kg).

LaRose attended Culver City High School and signed his first pro contract with the Los Angeles Angels on June 28, 1963. He spent five seasons in the Angels' farm system, reaching the Triple-A Seattle Angels for 11 games, before being sent to the Cubs' system after the 1967 season. In 1968, after batting .273 in 111 games for the Triple-A Tacoma Cubs, he was recalled by the parent team after the rosters were expanded on September 1. LaRose started one game at shortstop, going hitless in two at bats on September 14 against the Philadelphia Phillies' Larry Jackson. He struck out once and reached base when Jackson hit him with a pitch in the fourth inning.

LaRose spent 1968–1969 at the Triple-A level of the Cubs' and Atlanta Braves' systems before leaving the game.
