= Darcy Fast =

American baseball player (born 1947)

- Pitcher
- Born: March 10, 1947 (age 79); Dallas, Oregon, U.S.
- Batted: Left Threw: Left

MLB debut
- June 15, 1968, for the Chicago Cubs

Last MLB appearance
- August 28, 1968, for the Chicago Cubs

MLB statistics
- Win–loss record: 0–1
- Earned run average: 5.40
- Innings pitched: 10
- Stats at Baseball Reference

Teams
- Chicago Cubs (1968)

Darcy Rae Fast (born March 10, 1947) is an American former professional baseball player, a left-handed pitcher in the Major Leagues in 1968 for the Chicago Cubs.

== Playing career ==
Fast's only MLB decision was on July 4, 1968, pitching in relief in the second game of a doubleheader when the Cubs hosted the Philadelphia Phillies. Surrendering 4 runs in 3 2/3 innings of work, he was the losing pitcher in the 7–4 loss.

Fast appeared in eight MLB games for the Cubs, and struck out ten batters in ten innings pitched. He also walked eight and gave up six earned runs and eight hits. His professional career lasted four seasons, from 1967–70.

== Personal life ==
Fast wrote a book, The Missing Cub, about the 1969 Chicago Cubs team. Following his baseball career, he worked as a pastor in Centralia, Washington for 30 years.
