= 1968 Major League Baseball season =

1968 MLB season
- League: American League (AL); National League (NL)
- Sport: Baseball
- Duration: Regular season: April 10 – September 29, 1968; World Series: October 2–10, 1968
- Games: 162
- Teams: 20 (10 per league)
- TV partner: NBC

Draft
- Top draft pick: Tim Foli
- Picked by: New York Mets

Regular season
- Season MVP: AL: Denny McLain (DET); NL: Bob Gibson (STL)
- AL champions: Detroit Tigers
- AL runners-up: Baltimore Orioles
- NL champions: St. Louis Cardinals
- NL runners-up: San Francisco Giants

World Series
- Champions: Detroit Tigers
- Runners-up: St. Louis Cardinals
- World Series MVP: Mickey Lolich (DET)

MLB seasons
- ← 1967 1969 →

Locations of teams for the 1968 American League season
American League
Locations of teams for the 1966–1968 National League seasons
National League

The 1968 major league baseball season began on April 10, 1968. The regular season ended on September 29, with the St. Louis Cardinals and Detroit Tigers as the regular season champions of the National League and American League, respectively. The postseason began with Game 1 of the 65th World Series on October 2 and ended with Game 7 on October 10. In the second iteration of this World Series matchup, the Tigers defeated the Cardinals, four games to three, capturing their third championship in franchise history, since their previous in 1945. Going into the season, the defending World Series champions were the St. Louis Cardinals from the 1967 season.

The 39th All-Star Game was held on July 9 at the Houston Astrodome in Houston, Texas, home of the Houston Astros. The National League won, 1–0.

The 1968 season was the final year of baseball's pre-division era, in which the teams that finished in first place in each league went directly to the World Series to face each other for the "World Championship."

The Kansas City Athletics moved to Oakland, California as the Oakland Athletics, being the eighth team since 1953 to relocate, and the fourth American League team since then. Kansas City would be without a major league team for the 1968 season. Legal pressure from the city moved the originally planned 1971 American League expansion up to 1969, which saw the enfranchisement of the Kansas City Royals.

== Schedule ==
The 1968 schedule consisted of 162 games for all teams in the American League and National League, each of which had 10 teams. Each team was scheduled to play 18 games against the other nine teams of their respective league. This continued the format put in place by the American League since the 1961 season and by the National League since the 1962 season. This would be the last season with this format, as the following season would see a new format due to expansion and the creation of divisions.

Opening Day took place on April 10, featuring all 20 teams in both leagues. The final day of the regular season was on September 29, which saw all teams play, except for the Baltimore Orioles and Cleveland Indians. The World Series took place between October 2 and October 10.

== Rule changes ==
The 1968 season saw the following rule changes:

- To greater enforce the ban on the spitball, any pitcher who was found to have touched their mouth with their pitching hand will first get a warning, and second an ejection.
- In an attempt to speed up the game, the following rules were implemented:
  - Batters must now run back to the plate following a fouled bunt.
  - Pinch-hitters must be on the bench by the time the previous batter completed their at bat.
  - Teams were recommended to use golf carts to bring from the bullpen a relief pitcher.
- Any usage of "players to be named later" for trades were banned during the season. Over the offseason, players must be identified before the start of the season.
- Opening Day rosters were reduced to 25 players. Previously, prior to May 15, teams could have 28 players on their rosters.
- Teams were no longer able to pick up a player they dropped after August 31 until May 15 the following season.
- Any player under contract must pass through waivers before the team the players was on could drop him.
- For spring training, the American League approved a proto-designated hitter rule. Before a game, a player could be "designated" by the manager to be a pinch-hitter. This pinch-hitter would twice be allowed to pinch-hit, though not in the same inning.

== Teams ==
An asterisk (*) denotes the ballpark a team played the minority of their home games at

League	Team	City	Ballpark	Capacity	Manager
American League	Baltimore Orioles	Baltimore, Maryland	Baltimore Memorial Stadium	52,185	Hank Bauer
American League	Baltimore Orioles	Baltimore, Maryland	Baltimore Memorial Stadium	52,185	Earl Weaver
American League	Boston Red Sox	Boston, Massachusetts	Fenway Park	33,375	Dick Williams
American League	California Angels	Anaheim, California	Anaheim Stadium	43,202	Bill Rigney
American League	Chicago White Sox	Chicago, Illinois; Milwaukee, Wisconsin*	White Sox Park; Milwaukee County Stadium*	46,550; 43,768*	Eddie Stanky
American League	Chicago White Sox	Chicago, Illinois; Milwaukee, Wisconsin*	White Sox Park; Milwaukee County Stadium*	46,550; 43,768*	Les Moss
American League	Chicago White Sox	Chicago, Illinois; Milwaukee, Wisconsin*	White Sox Park; Milwaukee County Stadium*	46,550; 43,768*	Al López
American League	Cleveland Indians	Cleveland, Ohio	Cleveland Stadium	74,056	Alvin Dark
American League	Detroit Tigers	Detroit, Michigan	Tiger Stadium	53,089	Mayo Smith
American League	Minnesota Twins	Bloomington, Minnesota	Metropolitan Stadium	45,182	Cal Ermer
American League	New York Yankees	New York, New York	Yankee Stadium	67,000	Ralph Houk
American League	Oakland Athletics	Oakland, California	Oakland–Alameda County Coliseum	50,000	Bob Kennedy
American League	Washington Senators	Washington, D.C.	District of Columbia Stadium	43,500	Jim Lemon
National League	Atlanta Braves	Atlanta, Georgia	Atlanta Stadium	51,383	Lum Harris
National League	Chicago Cubs	Chicago, Illinois	Wrigley Field	36,644	Leo Durocher
National League	Cincinnati Reds	Cincinnati, Ohio	Crosley Field	29,603	Dave Bristol
National League	Houston Astros	Houston, Texas	Houston Astrodome	44,500	Grady Hatton
National League	Houston Astros	Houston, Texas	Houston Astrodome	44,500	Harry Walker
National League	Los Angeles Dodgers	Los Angeles, California	Dodger Stadium	56,000	Walter Alston
National League	New York Mets	New York, New York	Shea Stadium	55,300	Gil Hodges
National League	Philadelphia Phillies	Philadelphia, Pennsylvania	Connie Mack Stadium	33,608	Gene Mauch
National League	Philadelphia Phillies	Philadelphia, Pennsylvania	Connie Mack Stadium	33,608	George Myatt
National League	Philadelphia Phillies	Philadelphia, Pennsylvania	Connie Mack Stadium	33,608	Bob Skinner
National League	Pittsburgh Pirates	Pittsburgh, Pennsylvania	Forbes Field	35,500	Larry Shepard
National League	San Francisco Giants	San Francisco, California	Candlestick Park	42,500	Herman Franks
National League	St. Louis Cardinals	St. Louis, Missouri	Civic Center Busch Memorial Stadium	49,450	Red Schoendienst

== Standings ==
=== American League ===
American League
Team	W	L	Pct.	GB	Home	Road
Detroit Tigers	103	59	.636	—	56‍–‍25	47‍–‍34
Baltimore Orioles	91	71	.562	12	47‍–‍33	44‍–‍38
Cleveland Indians	86	75	.534	16½	43‍–‍37	43‍–‍38
Boston Red Sox	86	76	.531	17	46‍–‍35	40‍–‍41
New York Yankees	83	79	.512	20	39‍–‍42	44‍–‍37
Oakland Athletics	82	80	.506	21	44‍–‍38	38‍–‍42
Minnesota Twins	79	83	.488	24	41‍–‍40	38‍–‍43
California Angels	67	95	.414	36	32‍–‍49	35‍–‍46
Chicago White Sox	67	95	.414	36	36‍–‍45	31‍–‍50
Washington Senators	65	96	.404	37½	34‍–‍47	31‍–‍49

=== National League ===
National League
Team	W	L	Pct.	GB	Home	Road
St. Louis Cardinals	97	65	.599	—	47‍–‍34	50‍–‍31
San Francisco Giants	88	74	.543	9	42‍–‍39	46‍–‍35
Chicago Cubs	84	78	.519	13	47‍–‍34	37‍–‍44
Cincinnati Reds	83	79	.512	14	40‍–‍41	43‍–‍38
Atlanta Braves	81	81	.500	16	41‍–‍40	40‍–‍41
Pittsburgh Pirates	80	82	.494	17	40‍–‍41	40‍–‍41
Los Angeles Dodgers	76	86	.469	21	41‍–‍40	35‍–‍46
Philadelphia Phillies	76	86	.469	21	38‍–‍43	38‍–‍43
New York Mets	73	89	.451	24	32‍–‍49	41‍–‍40
Houston Astros	72	90	.444	25	42‍–‍39	30‍–‍51

=== Tie games ===
6 tie games (3 in AL, 3 in NL), which are not factored into winning percentage or games behind (and were often replayed again) occurred throughout the season.

==== American League ====
The Detroit Tigers and New York Yankees had two tie games each. The Cleveland Indians and Oakland Athletics had one tie each.

- May 15, Cleveland Indians vs. New York Yankees, tied at 2 in the middle of the eighth inning due to rain.
- May 24, Oakland Athletics vs. Detroit Tigers, tied at 2 after a shortened seven innings due to rain.
- August 23, New York Yankees vs. Detroit Tigers, tied at 3 after 19 innings on account of a 1 a.m. curfew. The game was replayed on August 25 in a doubleheader.

==== National League ====
The Atlanta Braves, Chicago Cubs, Cincinnati Reds, New York Mets, Pittsburgh Pirates, and San Francisco Giants had one tie each.

- May 26, Cincinnati Reds vs. Pittsburgh Pirates, tied at 8 after a shortened seven innings due to rain. The game went into a 54 minute rain delay during the top of the eighth, which was subsequently negated.
- September 2 (game 2), New York Mets vs. Atlanta Braves, tied at 2 in the middle of the seventh inning due to rain.
- September 2 (game 2), Chicago Cubs vs. San Francisco Giants, tied at 1 after nine innings on account of darkness.

== Postseason ==
The postseason began on October 2 and ended on October 10 with the Detroit Tigers defeating the St. Louis Cardinals in the 1968 World Series in seven games.

=== Bracket ===
World Series
AL	Detroit Tigers	4
NL	St. Louis Cardinals	3

== Managerial changes ==
=== Off-season ===
Team	Former Manager	New Manager
Atlanta Braves	Ken Silvestri	Lum Harris
Cleveland Indians	Joe Adcock	Alvin Dark
New York Mets	Salty Parker	Gil Hodges
Oakland Athletics	Luke Appling (Kansas City Athletics)	Bob Kennedy
Pittsburgh Pirates	Danny Murtaugh	Larry Shepard
Washington Senators	Gil Hodges	Jim Lemon

=== In-season ===
Team	Former Manager	New Manager
Baltimore Orioles	Hank Bauer	Earl Weaver
Chicago White Sox	Eddie Stanky	Les Moss
Chicago White Sox	Les Moss	Al López
Houston Astros	Grady Hatton	Harry Walker
Philadelphia Phillies	Gene Mauch	George Myatt
Philadelphia Phillies	George Myatt	Bob Skinner

== League leaders ==
Any team shown in small text indicates a previous team a player was on during the season.

=== American League ===
Hitting leaders
Stat	Player	Total
AVG	Carl Yastrzemski (BOS)	.301
OPS	Carl Yastrzemski (BOS)	.922
HR	Frank Howard (WAS)	44
RBI	Ken Harrelson (BOS)	109
R	Dick McAuliffe (DET)	95
H	Bert Campaneris (OAK)	177
SB	Bert Campaneris (OAK)	62

Pitching leaders
Stat	Player	Total
W	Denny McLain (DET)	31
L	George Brunet (CAL)	17
ERA	Luis Tiant (CLE)	1.60
K	Sam McDowell (CLE)	283
IP	Denny McLain (DET)	336.0
SV	Al Worthington (MIN)	18
WHIP	Dave McNally (BAL)	0.842

=== National League ===
Hitting leaders
Stat	Player	Total
AVG	Pete Rose (CIN)	.335
OPS	Willie McCovey (SF)	.923
HR	Willie McCovey (SF)	36
RBI	Willie McCovey (SF)	105
R	Glenn Beckert (CHC)	98
H	Felipe Alou (ATL); Pete Rose (CIN)	210
SB	Lou Brock (STL)	62

Pitching leaders
Stat	Player	Total
W	Juan Marichal (SF)	26
L	Claude Osteen (LAD); Ray Sadecki (SF)	18
ERA	Bob Gibson (STL)	1.12
K	Bob Gibson (STL)	268
IP	Juan Marichal (SF)	325.2
SV	Phil Regan (CHC/LAD)	25
WHIP	Bob Gibson (STL)	0.853

== Milestones ==
=== Batters ===
==== Cycles ====
- Jim Fregosi (CAL):
  - Fregosi hit for his second cycle, second in franchise history, and seventh reverse cycle in major league history, on May 20 against the Boston Red Sox.

==== Other batting accomplishments ====
- Frank Howard (WAS):
  - Tied an American League record by becoming the fifth player to hit home runs in six consecutive games between May 12 and 18.
- Jim Northrup (DET):
  - Became the sixth player to hit two grand slams in a single game, in a 14–3 win over the Cleveland Indians on June 24.
- Hank Aaron (ATL):
  - Became the eighth player in Major League history to hit 500 home runs in the third inning against the San Francisco Giants on July 14.
- Maury Wills (PIT):
  - Recorded his 500th career stolen base in the first inning against the Chicago Cubs on September 20. He became the 20th player to reach this mark.

=== Pitchers ===
==== Perfect games ====
- Catfish Hunter (OAK)
  - Pitched the ninth perfect game in major league history and the first in franchise history on May 8 against the Minnesota Twins. Hunter threw 107 pitches and struck out 11 in the 4–0 victory.

==== No-hitters ====
- Tom Phoebus (BAL):
  - Phoebus threw his first career no-hitter and seventh no-hitter in franchise history, by defeating the Boston Red Sox 6–0 on April 27. He walked three and struck out nine.
- George Culver (CIN):
  - Culver threw his first career no-hitter and 11th no-hitter in franchise history, by defeating the Philadelphia Phillies 6–1 in game two of a doubleheader on July 29. He walked five and struck out four.
- Gaylord Perry (SF):
  - Perry threw his first career no-hitter and 10th no-hitter in franchise history, by defeating the St. Louis Cardinals 1–0 on September 17. He walked two and struck out nine.
- Ray Washburn (STL):
  - Washburn threw his first career no-hitter and fifth no-hitter in franchise history, by defeating the San Francisco Giants 2–0 on September 18. He walked five and struck out eight.

==== Other pitching accomplishments ====
- Don Drysdale (LAD):
  - Set a Major League record when he threw six consecutive shutouts from May 14 through June 4.
- Don Wilson (HOU):
  - Became the fourth player to strikeout 18 batters in a single nine-inning game in a 6–1 win against the Cincinnati Reds in game two of a doubleheader on July 14.
- Hoyt Wilhelm (CWS):
  - Broke a record when he appeared in his 907th game as pitcher, breaking Cy Young's long standing record set in 1911.

=== Miscellaneous ===
- Houston Astros / New York Mets:
  - Play the longest shutout in Major League history, when the Astros defeat the Mets 1–0 in the 24th inning.

== Awards and honors ==
=== Regular season ===
Baseball Writers' Association of America Awards
BBWAA Award	National League	American League
Rookie of the Year	Johnny Bench (CIN)	Stan Bahnsen (NYY)
Cy Young Award	Bob Gibson (STL)	Denny McLain (DET)
Most Valuable Player	Bob Gibson (STL)	Denny McLain (DET)
Babe Ruth Award (World Series MVP)	–	Mickey Lolich (DET)
Gold Glove Awards
Position	National League	American League
Pitcher	Bob Gibson (STL)	Jim Kaat (MIN)
Catcher	Johnny Bench (CIN)	Bill Freehan (DET)
1st Base	Wes Parker (LAD)	George Scott (BOS)
2nd Base	Glenn Beckert (CHC)	Bobby Knoop (CAL)
3rd Base	Ron Santo (CHC)	Brooks Robinson (BAL)
Shortstop	Dal Maxvill (STL)	Luis Aparicio (CWS)
Outfield	Roberto Clemente (PIT)	Reggie Smith (BOS)
Outfield	Curt Flood (STL)	Mickey Stanley (DET)
Outfield	Willie Mays (SF)	Carl Yastrzemski (BOS)

=== Other awards ===
- Hutch Award: Pete Rose (CIN)
- Sport Magazine's World Series Most Valuable Player Award: Mickey Lolich (STL)

The Sporting News Awards
Award	National League	American League
Player of the Year	—	Denny McLain (DET)
Pitcher of the Year	Bob Gibson (STL)	Denny McLain (DET)
Fireman of the Year (Relief pitcher)	Phil Regan (CHC)	Wilbur Wood (CWS)
Rookie Player of the Year	Johnny Bench (CIN)	Del Unser (WAS)
Rookie Pitcher of the Year	Jerry Koosman (NYM)	Stan Bahnsen (NYY)
Comeback Player of the Year	Alex Johnson (CIN)	Ken Harrelson (BOS)
Manager of the Year	—	Mayo Smith (DET)
Executive of the Year	—	Jim Campbell (DET)

=== Monthly awards ===
==== Player of the Month ====
Month	National League
May	Don Drysdale (LAD)
June	Bob Gibson (STL)
July	Bob Gibson (STL)
August	Pete Rose (CIN)
September	Steve Blass (PIT)

=== Baseball Hall of Fame ===
- Kiki Cuyler
- Goose Goslin
- Joe Medwick

== Home field attendance ==
Team name	Wins	%±	Home attendance	%±	Per game
Detroit Tigers	103	13.2%	2,031,847	40.4%	25,085
St. Louis Cardinals	97	−4.0%	2,011,167	−3.8%	24,829
Boston Red Sox	86	−6.5%	1,940,788	12.3%	23,960
New York Mets	73	19.7%	1,781,657	13.8%	21,728
Los Angeles Dodgers	76	4.1%	1,581,093	−5.0%	19,520
Houston Astros	72	4.3%	1,312,887	−2.6%	16,208
New York Yankees	83	15.3%	1,185,666	−5.9%	14,459
Minnesota Twins	79	−13.2%	1,143,257	−22.9%	14,114
Atlanta Braves	81	5.2%	1,126,540	−18.9%	13,908
Chicago Cubs	84	−3.4%	1,043,409	6.8%	12,725
California Angels	67	−20.2%	1,025,956	−22.1%	12,666
Baltimore Orioles	91	19.7%	943,977	−1.2%	11,800
Cleveland Indians	86	14.7%	857,994	29.4%	10,593
Oakland Athletics	82	32.3%	837,466	15.3%	10,090
San Francisco Giants	88	−3.3%	837,220	−32.6%	10,336
Chicago White Sox	67	−24.7%	803,775	−18.5%	9,923
Cincinnati Reds	83	−4.6%	733,354	−23.5%	8,943
Pittsburgh Pirates	80	−1.2%	693,485	−23.5%	8,562
Philadelphia Phillies	76	−7.3%	664,546	−19.8%	8,204
Washington Senators	65	−14.5%	546,661	−29.1%	6,749

== Venues ==
With the relocation of the Kansas City Athletics from Kansas City, Missouri to Oakland, California as the Oakland Athletics, they leave Municipal Stadium (where they played 13 seasons) and move into Oakland–Alameda County Coliseum. They would go on to play there for 57 seasons through 2024, before again relocating.

The Chicago White Sox began playing select games in the former home of the Milwaukee Braves in Milwaukee, Wisconsin, at Milwaukee County Stadium, hosting nine of 81 home games, on May 15, 28, June 17, 24, July 11, 22, August 2, 8, and 26. Though only 11% of home games, these nine games accounted for 33% of all home games attendance for the White Sox.

== Media ==
=== Television ===
NBC was the exclusive national TV broadcaster of MLB, airing the weekend Game of the Week, the All-Star Game, and the World Series.

== See also ==
- 1968 in baseball (Events, Births, Deaths)
- 1968 Nippon Professional Baseball season
