= 1968 in baseball =

The following are the baseball events of the year 1968 throughout the world.

== The Year of the Pitcher ==
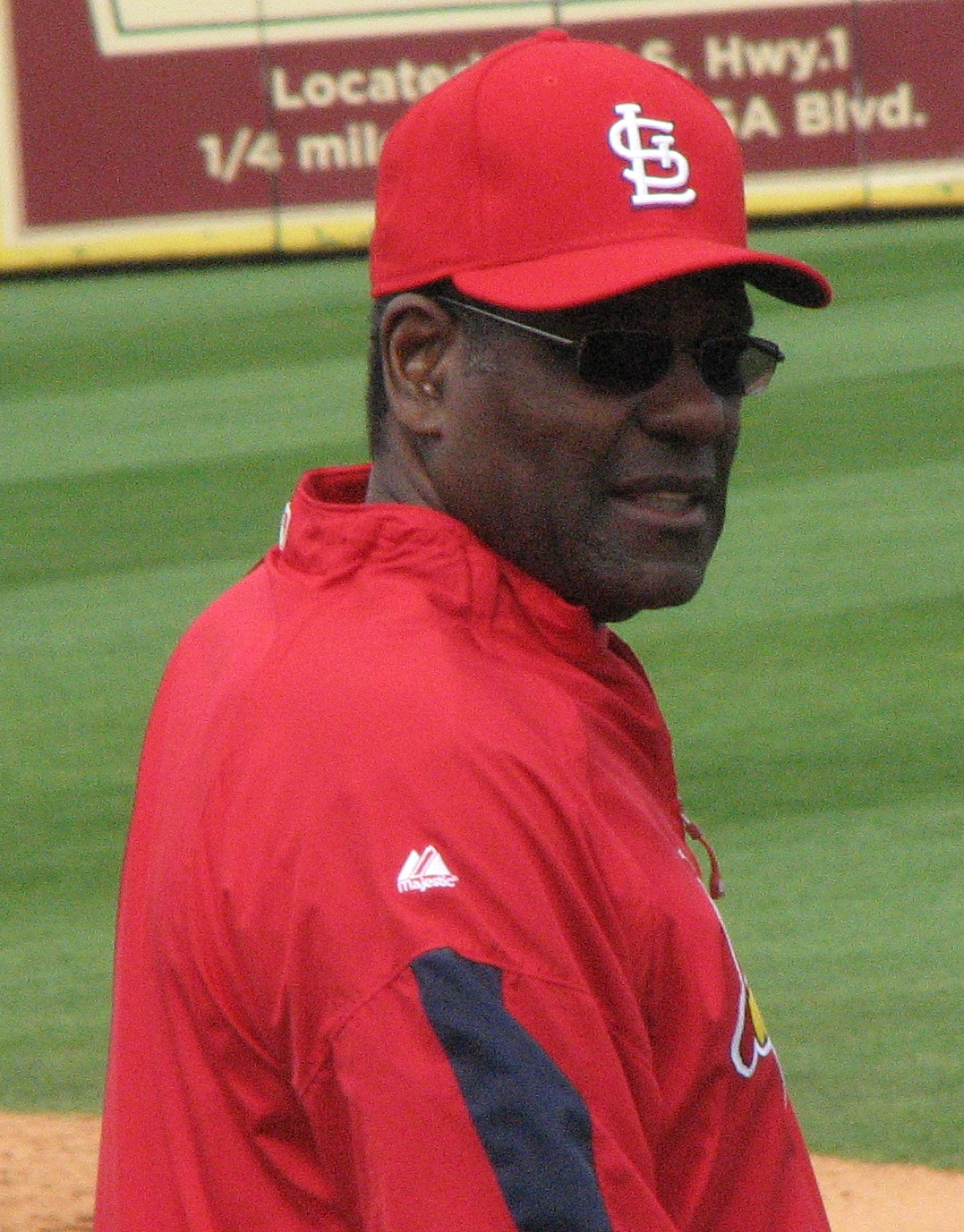
Bob Gibson in 2010

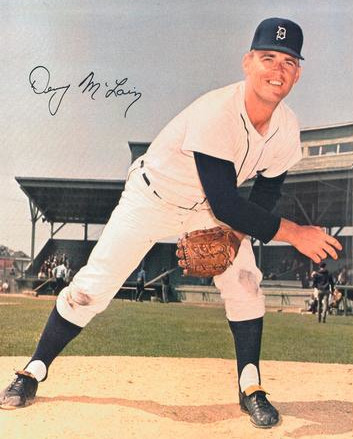
Denny McLain

In Major League Baseball, the trend throughout the 1960s was of increased pitching dominance. After the record home run year by Roger Maris in 1961, the major leagues increased the size of the strike zone from the top of the batter's shoulders to the bottom of his knees. A significant "power shortage" culminated in 1968, with far fewer runs scored than in the early 1960s.

Pitchers including Bob Gibson of the St. Louis Cardinals and Denny McLain of the Detroit Tigers dominated hitters, producing 339 shutouts in 1968, almost double the number of shutouts thrown in 1962. Individually, Gibson set a modern earned run average record of 1.12, the lowest in 54 years, and set a World Series record of 17 strikeouts in Game 1. McLain won 31 regular season games, the only player to reach the 30 win milestone since Dizzy Dean in 1934. Mickey Lolich won three complete games in the World Series, the last player as of 2015 to do so. Luis Tiant of the Cleveland Indians had the American League's lowest ERA at 1.60 and allowed a batting average of only .168, a major league record. Don Drysdale of the Los Angeles Dodgers threw a record 58 2/3 consecutive scoreless innings, and Catfish Hunter of the Oakland Athletics was the first American League pitcher to record a perfect game since Don Larsen in Game 5 of the 1956 World Series. In addiction, Juan Marichal of the San Francisco Giants led the National League with 26 wins and 30 complete games.

Hitting was anemic as Carl Yastrzemski of the Boston Red Sox would be the only American League hitter to finish the season with a batting average higher than .300. Yastrzemski's batting average of .301 was the lowest batting average of any league batting champion. The American League's collective slugging average of .340 remains the lowest since 1915 (when the game was still in the so-called dead-ball era), while the collective batting average of .231 is the all-time lowest. As a result of the dropping offensive statistics, Major League Baseball Rules Committee took steps to reduce the advantage held by pitchers by lowering the height of the pitchers mound from 15 inches to 10 inches, and by reducing the size of the strike zone for the 1969 season. 1969 batting averages climbed back to their historical averages and never again would pitching have as large a statistical advantage over batting in the major leagues.

1968 was the final year when baseball had no divisions within the two leagues, with the only post-season competition being the World Series itself. Four expansion teams would join baseball for the season following in 1969. This was also the first season that the Athletics franchise played in Oakland, California, after their departure from Kansas City, Missouri.

== Champions ==
=== Major League Baseball ===
- World Series: Detroit Tigers over St. Louis Cardinals (4–3); Mickey Lolich, MVP
- All-Star Game, July 9 at the Astrodome: National League, 1–0; Willie Mays, MVP

=== Other champions ===
- Big League World Series: Charleston, West Virginia
- College World Series: USC
- Japan Series: Yomiuri Giants over Hankyu Braves (4–2)
- Little League World Series: Wakayama, Osaka, Japan
- Senior League World Series: New Hyde Park, New York

== Awards and honors ==
- Baseball Hall of Fame
  - Kiki Cuyler
  - Goose Goslin
  - Joe Medwick

Baseball Writers' Association of America Awards
BBWAA Award	National League	American League
Rookie of the Year	Johnny Bench (CIN)	Stan Bahnsen (NYY)
Cy Young Award	Bob Gibson (STL)	Denny McLain (DET)
Most Valuable Player	Bob Gibson (STL)	Denny McLain (DET)
Gold Glove Awards
Position	National League	American League
Pitcher	Bob Gibson (STL)	Jim Kaat (MIN)
Catcher	Johnny Bench (CIN)	Bill Freehan (DET)
1st Base	Wes Parker (LAD)	George Scott (BOS)
2nd Base	Glenn Beckert (CHC)	Bobby Knoop (CAL)
3rd Base	Ron Santo (CHC)	Brooks Robinson (BAL)
Shortstop	Dal Maxvill (STL)	Luis Aparicio (CWS)
Outfield	Roberto Clemente (PIT)	Reggie Smith (BOS)
Outfield	Curt Flood (STL)	Mickey Stanley (DET)
Outfield	Willie Mays (SF)	Carl Yastrzemski (BOS)

== Statistical leaders ==
	American League		National League	
Stat	Player	Total	Player	Total
AVG	Carl Yastrzemski (BOS)	.301	Pete Rose (CIN)	.335
HR	Frank Howard (WAS)	44	Willie McCovey (SF)	36
RBI	Ken Harrelson (BOS)	109	Willie McCovey (SF)	105
W	Denny McLain (DET)	31	Juan Marichal (SF)	26
ERA	Luis Tiant (CLE)	1.60	Bob Gibson (STL)	1.12
K	Sam McDowell (CLE)	283	Bob Gibson (STL)	268

== Major league baseball final standings ==
=== American League final standings ===
American League
Team	W	L	Pct.	GB	Home	Road
Detroit Tigers	103	59	.636	—	56‍–‍25	47‍–‍34
Baltimore Orioles	91	71	.562	12	47‍–‍33	44‍–‍38
Cleveland Indians	86	75	.534	16½	43‍–‍37	43‍–‍38
Boston Red Sox	86	76	.531	17	46‍–‍35	40‍–‍41
New York Yankees	83	79	.512	20	39‍–‍42	44‍–‍37
Oakland Athletics	82	80	.506	21	44‍–‍38	38‍–‍42
Minnesota Twins	79	83	.488	24	41‍–‍40	38‍–‍43
California Angels	67	95	.414	36	32‍–‍49	35‍–‍46
Chicago White Sox	67	95	.414	36	36‍–‍45	31‍–‍50
Washington Senators	65	96	.404	37½	34‍–‍47	31‍–‍49

Locations of teams for the 1968 American League season
American League

=== National League final standings ===
National League
Team	W	L	Pct.	GB	Home	Road
St. Louis Cardinals	97	65	.599	—	47‍–‍34	50‍–‍31
San Francisco Giants	88	74	.543	9	42‍–‍39	46‍–‍35
Chicago Cubs	84	78	.519	13	47‍–‍34	37‍–‍44
Cincinnati Reds	83	79	.512	14	40‍–‍41	43‍–‍38
Atlanta Braves	81	81	.500	16	41‍–‍40	40‍–‍41
Pittsburgh Pirates	80	82	.494	17	40‍–‍41	40‍–‍41
Los Angeles Dodgers	76	86	.469	21	41‍–‍40	35‍–‍46
Philadelphia Phillies	76	86	.469	21	38‍–‍43	38‍–‍43
New York Mets	73	89	.451	24	32‍–‍49	41‍–‍40
Houston Astros	72	90	.444	25	42‍–‍39	30‍–‍51

Locations of teams for the 1966–1968 National League seasons
National League

== Nippon Professional Baseball final standings ==
=== Central League final standings ===
Central League	G	W	L	T	Pct.	GB
Yomiuri Giants	134	77	53	4	.592	—
Hanshin Tigers	133	72	58	3	.554	5.0
Hiroshima Toyo Carp	134	68	62	4	.523	9.0
Sankei Atoms	134	64	66	4	.492	13.0
Taiyo Whales	133	59	71	3	.454	18.0
Chunichi Dragons	134	50	80	4	.385	27.0

=== Pacific League final standings ===
Pacific League	G	W	L	T	Pct.	GB
Hankyu Braves	134	80	50	4	.615	—
Nankai Hawks	136	79	51	6	.608	1.0
Tokyo Orions	139	67	63	9	.515	13.0
Kintetsu Buffaloes	135	57	73	5	.438	23.0
Nishitetsu Lions	133	56	74	3	.431	24.0
Toei Flyers	135	51	79	5	.392	29.0

== Events ==
=== January ===
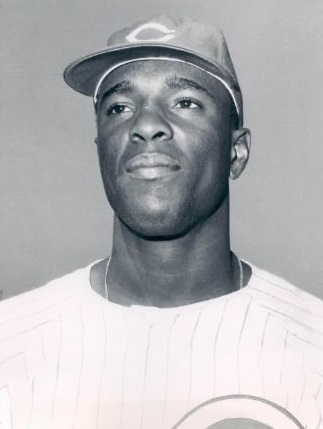
Alex Johnson in 1968

- January 11
  - Kansas City officially re-enters the American League when its expansion team is awarded to Ewing Kauffman. The local pharmaceuticals magnate pays $5.3 million for the new franchise, which will replace the recently departed Athletics and begin play in 1969. Kansas City, Kauffman vows, "will never again be without Major League Baseball."
    - In the coming days, he appoints Cedric Tallis the first general manager in team history. Tallis, 53, is the former business manager of the California Angels.
  - The Cincinnati Reds acquire Alex Johnson from the St. Louis Cardinals for fellow outfielder Dick Simpson. Johnson, 25, had batted only .211 with St. Louis in 1966–1967, but he will win Cincinnati's left field job, hit .312 in 149 games (fourth in the National League), and be named The Sporting News' NL Comeback Player of the Year for 1968.
- January 23 – Joe Medwick is voted into the Baseball Hall of Fame by the BBWAA. The former slugging outfielder, 56, is named on 84.8 percent of the ballots, the only candidate to exceed the 75% threshold; ex-catcher Roy Campanella, named on 72.4%, narrowly misses election.
- January 26 – The Philadelphia Phillies sign Venezuelan second baseman Manny Trillo as an amateur free agent. Trillo's eventual, 17-year MLB career will see him make four All-Star teams, win three Gold Glove Awards and earn two World Series rings.
- January 27 – The January edition of the 1968 amateur draft results in notable young players joining MLB organizations.
  - In the regular phase, the Oakland Athletics select future four-time All-Star George Hendrick, 18, from Los Angeles' John C. Fremont High School with the first overall pick; in the second round, the cross-bay San Francisco Giants select 8x Gold Glove Award winner Garry Maddox, 18, from San Pedro High School, then, one round later, draft hard-hitting, 19-year-old outfielder George Foster from El Camino College.
  - In the secondary phase, the Los Angeles Dodgers take Davey Lopes, a 22-year-old outfielder, out of Kansas' Washburn University in the second round. Converted to second base, Lopes will become a Dodger regular for nearly a decade and a 4x All-Star.
- January 28 – Goose Goslin and Kiki Cuyler are admitted into the Hall of Fame by unanimous vote of the Special Veterans Committee.

=== February ===
- February 6 – Voters in King County, Washington, approve a $40 million bond issue to build a domed, multipurpose stadium. The Kingdome will be built between 1972 and 1976 and operate from 1976 until its demolition in 2000.
- February 8 – Johnny Edwards, former three-time NL All-Star and 2x Gold Glove Award winner for the Cincinnati Reds, is traded to the St. Louis Cardinals for catcher Pat Corrales and infielder Jimy Williams. Edwards, 29, is losing his starting catcher job to rookie and future Hall of Famer Johnny Bench.
- February 13
  - The San Francisco Giants and Los Angeles Dodgers execute a four-player trade when catcher Tom Haller and minor-league hurler Fran Kasheta go to Los Angeles for second baseman Ron Hunt and utility infielder Nate Oliver. The trade is the first between the two rivals since their move to the West Coast, and the first since the December 1956 deal that would have sent Jackie Robinson from the Brooklyn Dodgers to the New York Giants—only to be nullified by Robinson's retirement one month later.
  - In the American League, the Chicago White Sox and Washington Senators make a six-player swap. Chicago sends pitchers Dennis Higgins and Steve Jones and shortstop Ron Hansen to Washington for pitchers Buster Narum and Bob Priddy and infielder Tim Cullen.
- February 21
  - Seattle's American League expansion team, set to debut in 1969, names Marvin Milkes, 44, its first general manager. Milkes had previously been assistant GM of the California Angels.
  - A 26-year-old rookie third baseman, invited to his first spring training camp with the New York Yankees, arrives a day early in Fort Lauderdale after driving, with his wife and four young children, from their home near Fresno—only to find that the Bombers have not yet set aside living accommodations for them and all hotel rooms in the Florida resort are occupied. The family of six spend the night sleeping in their car in a beachside parking lot. "It wasn't so bad," the rookie says. "There were 11 or 12 cars alongside us with people in the same fix." The next day, he reports to the Yankee camp and living quarters are arranged for him and his family. The rookie is Bobby Cox, who, after a lacklustre 220 games with the Yanks in 1968 and 1969, begins a managing career in their organization that will ultimately lead to the Hall of Fame.

=== March ===
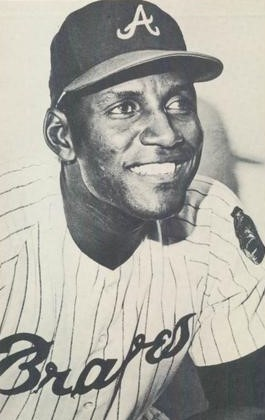
Rico Carty

- March 4 – The San Francisco Giants sign pitcher Elias Sosa as an undrafted free agent.
- March 21
  - National League owners, meeting in Miami, debate moving up their expansion timeline to 1969 from 1971 to match the American League's plan. The NL is reported to have chosen San Diego as its 11th city, but cannot agree on a 12th member. Dallas–Fort Worth, ready to expand Turnpike Stadium, is vetoed by Roy Hofheinz of the Houston Astros to protect his in-state broadcast revenues. Milwaukee, which lost the Braves to Atlanta in 1966, is unpopular among NL owners who resent the bitter legal battle the Wisconsin city waged against them to stop the franchise transfer.
  - Meanwhile, the American League's Kansas City expansion team set to debut next season chooses Royals as its identity after a "name that team" competition. The winning entry is inspired by the American Royal livestock show held annually in the region.
- March 24 – The Chicago Cubs release relief pitcher Dick Radatz, a former AL All-Star known in his heyday as "The Monster". Radatz, 30, will sign a Triple-A contract with the Detroit Tigers on April 22 and spend the year with their Toledo Mud Hens affiliate.
- March 26 – The Chicago White Sox sell the contract of veteran American League slugger Rocky Colavito to the Los Angeles Dodgers. Colavito, 34, is entering his 14th and final big-league season; the Dodgers will release him July 11, and four days later the native of The Bronx will "come home" to sign with his final team, the New York Yankees.
- March 27 – The Atlanta Braves are staggered by the loss of hard-hitting outfielder Rico Carty, diagnosed with tuberculosis, for the entire upcoming season. The 29-year-old Carty—the batting champion (.350) of the recently concluded Dominican Professional Baseball League season—will fully recover from the disease and return to MLB with a vengeance in 1969 and 1970, batting .342 and an NL-best .366, with a combined 279 hits and 41 homers in 240 games. Although he'll miss another season in 1971 with a severe knee injury, Carty will again bounce back and extend his big-league career through 1979 while playing for six clubs.
- March 31 – Pacific Northwest Sports, owners of Seattle's expansion team, announces that it has chosen Pilots as the club's nickname. The moniker is suggested by a local resident to recognize Seattle's maritime heritage and its status as the home of aircraft manufacturer Boeing.

=== April ===
- April 2 – Infielder Phil Linz, who'd been released by the New York Mets earlier this year, returns to the Mets as a free agent.
- April 3
  - Southpaw Hank Aguirre of Azusa, California, "comes home" to his native region when the Detroit Tigers send him to the Los Angeles Dodgers for a minor-league player to be named later (infielder Fred Moulder). Aguirre, 37, is a 13-year American League veteran who won his circuit's earned run average crown in 1962 (2.21).
  - Pitcher Skip Lockwood, selected by the Houston Astros from the Oakland Athletics in last November's Rule 5 draft, is returned to Oakland when the Astros opt against keeping Lockwood on their varsity roster.

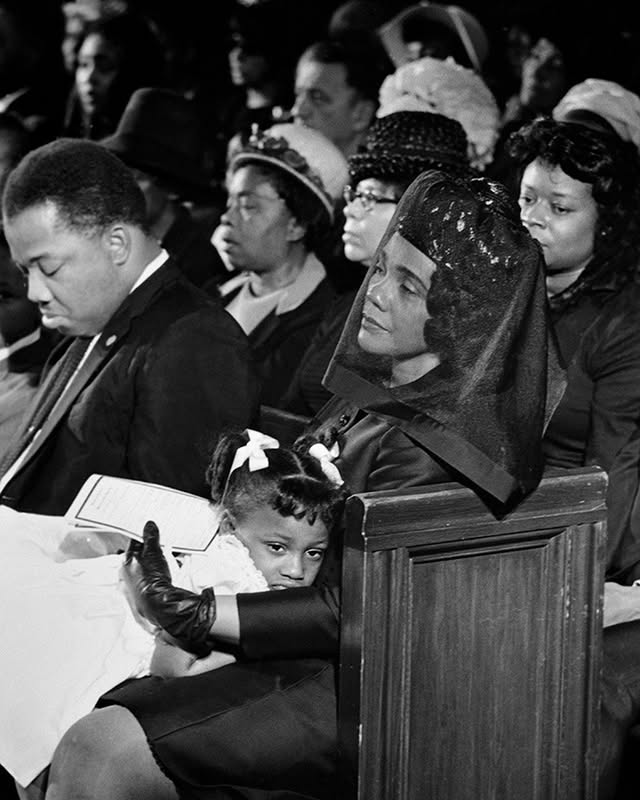
Martin Luther King Jr. is mourned at his 1968 funeral by his widow, Coretta, and youngest child, Bernice

- April 4 – The Rev. Dr. Martin Luther King Jr., the American civil rights leader, is assassinated in Memphis, Tennessee, and violent civil disturbances break out in multiple U.S. cities. Riots in Washington postpone the traditional "Presidential Opener" on April 8 at District of Columbia Stadium. Cincinnati's National League opener also is postponed. Major League Baseball calls off all games scheduled for April 9 to mark King's funeral.
- April 11 – Denny McLain gets the ball in the Detroit Tigers' second game of the 1968 campaign. He goes seven innings against the defending American League champion Boston Red Sox, allows six hits (including two homers), and leaves for a pinch hitter with the game tied, 3–3. Although the Tigers triumph, 4–3, the victory goes to reliever Jon Warden. McLain gives little evidence he's in store for an historic season, but by September 19 his record will be 31 wins, five defeats—MLB's first 30+-game winner since Dizzy Dean in 1934—and, like Dean, he is driving his team towards a World Series.
- April 14 – Jim Bunning's first win with the Pittsburgh Pirates, 3–0 at Los Angeles' Dodger Stadium, is his 40th career shutout and includes his 1,000th National League strikeout, making him the first pitcher since Cy Young with 1,000 in each league.
- April 15 – In a 24-inning, six hour and six minute marathon, the Houston Astros defeat the visiting New York Mets, 1–0, to prevail in the longest MLB game, in terms of both innings and duration, to end in a shutout as of 2025. In the bottom of the 24th, Astro Bob Aspromonte's bases-loaded ground ball goes through the legs of Met shortstop Al Weis for an error (the Mets' only miscue of the game) to plate Norm Miller for the winning run.
  - Miller's tally also breaks the Met mound staff's streak of 391/3 straight scoreless innings pitched, which will stand as the longest by a team during 1968. The shutout innings skein began only two days earlier and was compiled over just three games, two of them New York losses.
- April 17 – A crowd of 50,164 jams the Oakland–Alameda County Coliseum to greet the newly transplanted Athletics at the first MLB game played on Northern California's East Bay. Lew Krausse Jr. throws the maiden pitch, while the Baltimore Orioles' Boog Powell lashes the first hit (and home run) in the two-year-old stadium in the second inning, and Baltimore triumphs, 4–1. Dave McNally tosses a two-hitter, but one of them is Rick Monday's homer, accounting for Oakland's only run in the sixth.
- April 19 – Nolan Ryan of the New York Mets becomes the sixth pitcher in National League history to strike out the side on nine pitches. But the Los Angeles Dodgers win 3–2 at Shea Stadium.
- April 23 – The Chicago Cubs acquire pitcher Phil Regan and outfielder Jim Hickman from the Dodgers for southpaw hurler Jim Ellis and outfielder Ted Savage. Regan will lead the NL in saves (25) in 1968, and Hickman will make the Senior Circuit's All-Star team in 1970.
- April 25 – The Chicago White Sox lose their tenth consecutive game to start the 1968 campaign, stretching their two-season losing streak to 15 contests dating to September 1967.
- April 26 – A year and 12 days after his sensational MLB debut, when he hurled a no-hitter for 82/3 innings against the New York Yankees, the Boston Red Sox sell the contract of Billy Rohr, 22, to the Cleveland Indians. Rohr will make his last big-league appearance in relief on June 26, then spend the rest of his pro career in the minor leagues before his 1972 retirement.
- April 27 – Tom Phoebus, the Baltimore Orioles' top pitcher in 1967, throws a 6–0 no-hitter against the Red Sox at Memorial Stadium. He walks three and fans nine. Brooks Robinson drives in three runs and makes a great stab to rob Rico Petrocelli of a hit in the eighth inning. Converted outfielder Curt Blefary is Phoebus' catcher.
  - Today's no-hitter is the first of five to be thrown in the majors during "The Year of the Pitcher". There will also be 13 complete-game one-hitters.

=== May ===
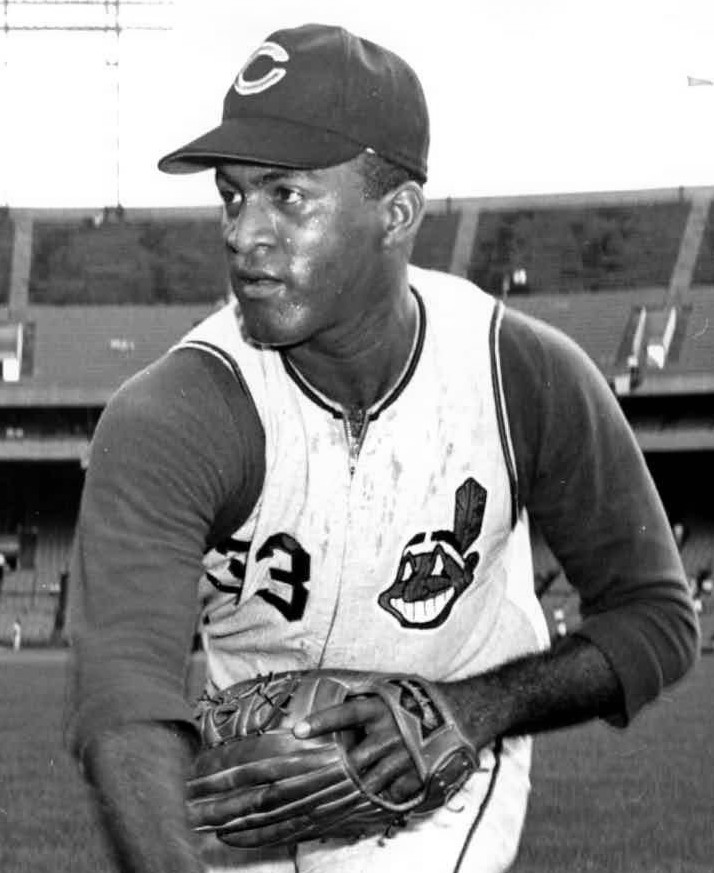
Luis Tiant in 1965

- May 2 – At Shea Stadium, pitcher John Boozer of the Philadelphia Phillies is ejected from a game without having thrown a pitch. His Phillies trailing the New York Mets by what will be the final score of 3–0, Boozer, after a 13-minute rain delay, enters the game in the seventh inning in relief of Woodie Fryman and repeatedly goes to his mouth while warming up in contravention of the anti-spitball rule that had been introduced this year. Home plate umpire Ed Vargo gives Boozer two warnings and awards three balls to batter Bud Harrelson—the last resulting in Boozer's ejection, as well as that of Phillie manager Gene Mauch.
- May 6 – At Memorial Stadium, Baltimore Orioles pitcher Dave Leonhard takes a no-hitter into the seventh inning before Detroit Tigers outfielder Jim Northrup breaks it up with a single after two outs. Leonhard settles for a one-hit shutout, 4–0 victory over Detroit.
- May 8 – At Oakland–Alameda County Coliseum, Catfish Hunter of the Athletics pitches a 4–0 perfect game over the Minnesota Twins. The perfecto is the first in an American League regular season game since Charlie Robertson's in 1922. Thrown in only the 25th contest since the Athletics moved to Oakland, Hunter's is also the first perfect game in the 68-year-old franchise's storied history and its first no-hitter of any kind since Bill McCahan's on September 3, 1947, when the Athletics were based in Philadelphia. Hunter strikes out 11 batters, including Rich Reese for the final out. He also records three RBIs: with a seventh-inning bunt single that drives in Rick Monday to break a scoreless tie, and a single in the eighth to drive in Jim Pagliaroni, his catcher, and Monday.
- May 17 – Luis Tiant of the Cleveland Indians extends his consecutive scoreless innings pitched streak to 42—the AL's longest of 1968—before the Baltimore Orioles strike for three runs in the sixth frame of today's 6–2 Baltimore victory at Municipal Stadium. Tiant had fired four consecutive complete-game shutouts since last being scored upon on April 20.
- May 20 – The California Angels' Jim Fregosi hits for the cycle "the hard way" but his 11th-inning single, which completes the feat, is the winning blow in the Angels' 5–4 win over the visiting Boston Red Sox. Fregosi registers 1968's only "cycle" in the majors.
- May 25–26 – The Detroit Tigers and host Oakland Athletics split successive one-run games marred by injuries and brushback pitches. In the former game, won by the Tigers, 2–1, Al Kaline, Detroit's future Hall of Famer, sustains a hairline fracture of his right ulnar bone after being hit by a Lew Krausse pitch in the sixth inning; he will miss six weeks of action. Then, in the latter contest, Kaline's teammate and fellow outfielder Jim Northrup is struck in the batting helmet by a Jack Aker delivery in the midst of a furious Detroit rally, also in the sixth inning. He charges the mound and fires a "barrage of punches" at Aker, who sustains five spike wounds to his right leg, a swollen lip, a cut on his forehead, and a black eye; he leaves the game for repairs. Northrup is hospitalized, but he will return to action in the Tigers' next game tomorrow. Umpire Ed Runge ejects Northrup and Oakland's Krausse and Blue Moon Odom.
- May 27 – After ten hours of debate and 16 secret ballots, the National League votes to expand to 12 teams in 1969 by awarding franchises to San Diego and Montréal. San Diego's candidacy had been strongly supported by Walter O'Malley, the powerful owner of the Los Angeles Dodgers; it boasts a 45,000-seat stadium ready for occupancy. The city of Montréal, without professional baseball since 1960 and lacking a suitable facility, promises to build a domed stadium in time for the 1971 season. The granting of MLB's first Canadian franchise rankles U.S. candidates Buffalo, Dallas–Fort Worth and Milwaukee.
  - By adding two teams in time for the 1969 season, the NL matches the American League, which in October 1967 had announced its expansion to Kansas City and Seattle. However, the Nationals currently reject divisional play and post-season playoffs, and the AL's decision to cut the regular season from 162 to 156 games. Commissioner William Eckert will attempt to mediate.
- May 31 – At Dodger Stadium and facing the arch-rival San Francisco Giants, Los Angeles' Don Drysdale is working on his fifth consecutive shutout victory when he loads the bases in the top of the ninth inning. His 2–2 inside pitch nicks Giants' batter Dick Dietz on the elbow. The apparent "HBP" would force in a run, make the game 3–1 Los Angeles, and halt Drysdale's scoreless innings pitched streak at 44 frames. But home plate umpire Harry Wendelstedt rules that Dietz did not make an effort to evade Drysdale's pitch and orders him back to the plate—nullifying the Giants' run. A wild argument ensues and San Francisco manager Herman Franks is ejected, but the ruling stands. Dietz flies out, the Giants do not score, and Drysdale's scoreless streak stays intact at 45. Walter Johnson's all-time MLB record of 552/3 straight shutout innings pitched, set in 1913, remains within reach.

=== June ===
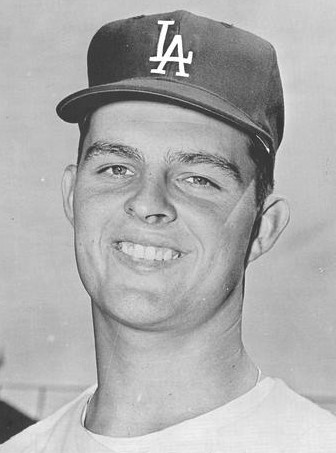
Don Drysdale in 1961

- June 1 – St. Louis Cardinals pitcher Joe Hoerner ties a National League record for relievers with six consecutive strikeouts vs. the New York Mets.
- June 3 – The New York Yankees turn a triple play in the eighth inning of a 4–3 loss to the Minnesota Twins. It will be the team's last triple play until 2010.
- June 4
  - Don Drysdale of the Los Angeles Dodgers fires his MLB-record sixth consecutive shutout, blanking the Pittsburgh Pirates on three hits, 5–0. Drysdale's consecutive scoreless innings streak, now 54, is only 12/3 frames short of Walter Johnson's all-time record. The former mark of five straight shutouts was held by Doc White of the 1904 Chicago White Sox.
  - After almost 18 years as the Dodgers' top baseball executive, Buzzie Bavasi, 53, departs to become president and minority owner of the San Diego Padres, a National League expansion team set to debut in 1969. Longtime Dodger farm system boss Fresco Thompson replaces Bavasi in Los Angeles.
- June 7
  - In the 1968 Major League Baseball draft, the Dodgers select Steve Garvey, Ron Cey, Bill Buckner, Bobby Valentine, Joe Ferguson and Doyle Alexander. All, save Valentine (whose brilliant future is torpedoed by a broken leg in 1973), become stars; Garvey, Cey and Ferguson anchor Los Angeles' four-time NL pennant winners between 1974 and 1981.
  - The first round yields All-Stars Thurman Munson (fourth overall, New York Yankees), Greg Luzinski (11th overall, Philadelphia Phillies), and Gary Matthews (17th, San Francisco Giants). Tim Foli is picked at the top of the draft by the New York Mets.
- June 8 – Against the Philadelphia Phillies at Dodger Stadium, Los Angeles' Don Drysdale breaks Walter Johnson's 1913 streak of 552/3 consecutive scoreless innings. A fifth-inning sacrifice fly by Howie Bedell scores Tony Taylor for the run that ends the spotless streak at 582/3 innings. Twenty years later, in 1988, Drysdale—by then a member of Dodgers' broadcasting team—will be an eyewitness to Orel Hershiser's surpassing of his achievement when Hershiser sets a new MLB record, 59 straight shutout innings.
- June 15
  - The Phillies (27–27, tied for sixth in the NL but only 5½ games out of first) fire Gene Mauch, the longest-tenured manager in their 85-year history, and replace him with former MLB outfielder Bob Skinner, skipper of their Triple-A San Diego affiliate. Mauch's Phils had gone 646–684–2 (.486) since April 16, 1960.
  - At the trading deadline (without waivers) then in place, the American League-leading Detroit Tigers pick up bullpen depth by acquiring veteran right-hander John Wyatt from the New York Yankees for left-hander Jim Rooker, a "player to be named later" added to the deal September 30.
  - The Cleveland Indians and California Angels exchange outfielders, with Vic Davalillo going to Anaheim for Jimmie Hall.
  - The brand-new Seattle Pilots purchase the contract of sore-armed, former 20-game-winner Jim Bouton from the Yankees. Bouton, 29, has made 12 appearances and three starts for New York; he'll spend the rest of 1968 on the roster of Seattle's final Pacific Coast League team, becoming a knuckleball-throwing relief pitcher, then join the 1969 Pilots when they debut in the major leagues.
- June 17 – Languishing in tenth and last place in the National League, the 23–38 Houston Astros oust manager Grady Hatton and replace him with batting instructor Harry "The Hat" Walker. It's Walker's third opportunity to helm an NL team, having previously managed the St. Louis Cardinals and Pittsburgh Pirates for all or portions of four seasons.
- June 18 – The Chicago Cubs release pitcher Don Larsen, author of a perfect game in the 1956 World Series as a member of the Yankees. Attempting a comeback, Larsen is 0–4 for Double-A San Antonio when he's released, effectively ending his career.
- June 24 – Detroit Tigers right fielder Jim Northrup belts two grand slams, as the Tigers beat the Cleveland Indians, 14–3, at Cleveland Stadium. Northrup connects for his first slam off Eddie Fisher in the fifth inning and the second off Billy Rohr in the sixth, to become the sixth player in Major League Baseball history to hit two grand slams in one single game.
- June 28 – The Chicago Cubs sweep the Los Angeles Dodgers, 8–3 and 1–0, in front of 42,261, the largest Wrigley Field crowd in over 20 years. Randy Hundley catches both games and drives in four of the Cubs' nine runs.

=== July ===
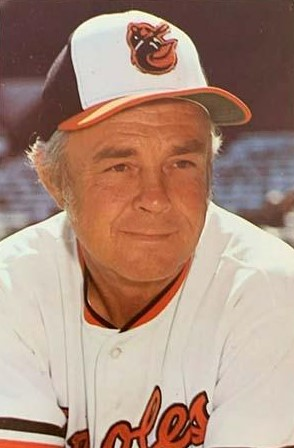
Earl Weaver in 1976

- July 1 – In a season that will see him post a 1.12 ERA, Bob Gibson's streak of 482/3 innings of scoreless pitching is broken in the first inning of today's 5–1 victory at Dodger Stadium. In today's contest, Gibson defeats newly crowned MLB record-holder Don Drysdale.
- July 3 – Luis Tiant of the Cleveland Indians strikes out 19 in a ten inning, 1–0 victory over the Minnesota Twins. He allows six hits and no bases on balls.
- July 9
  - At the Houston Astrodome, in the first All-Star Game to be played in an indoor arena and on artificial turf, the National League defeats the American League 1–0. Appropriately, pitching dominates the game. Willie Mays, playing in place of injured Pete Rose, tallies an unearned run in the first inning against American League starter Luis Tiant. Don Drysdale, Juan Marichal, Steve Carlton, Tom Seaver, Ron Reed and Jerry Koosman hold the AL to three hits, as Mays is named MVP.
  - At the All-Star break in the last year before divisional play, the two pennant races seem decided. In the AL, the Detroit Tigers (55–28) are 9½ games in front of Alvin Dark's surprising Indians; in the NL, the defending world champion St. Louis Cardinals (55–30) have a ten-length margin over the Cincinnati Reds.
- July 10 – MLB's long-running expansion wrangle reaches initial resolution when the National League agrees to split into two, six-team divisions and adopt a post-season playoff series to determine its pennant winner, and the American League agrees to increase its regular-season schedule from 156 to 162 games for 1969. Each circuit's in-season schedule will be "un-balanced," with 18 games against divisional foes and 12 against out-of-division clubs.
  - Today's accord, brokered by Commissioner William Eckert, is for one year only, but divisional play, the annual "League Championship Series" playoffs, and the un-balanced, 162-game schedule, will soon become permanent.
  - Assignment of each league's 12 teams into divisions is the main sticking point. The AL's realignment, grudgingly accepted by its established Midwestern teams, is geographical, with both of its two expansion franchises assigned to the West division; the National's, based on preserving the Midwest rivalry between the Cubs and Cardinals within an Eastern division, results in the placement of its Atlanta and Cincinnati franchises, located in the Eastern Time Zone, in a West grouping that will include its three California teams.
- July 11 – The Baltimore Orioles (43–37 and 10½ games out of first) promote first base coach Earl Weaver to manager, replacing Hank Bauer. Weaver, 37 and until this season a career minor-leaguer, will manage the Orioles for all or parts of 17 seasons, and win four American League pennants, the 1970 World Series, and a berth in Cooperstown.
- July 12
  - The Chicago White Sox (34–45, ninth in the AL and 18½ games from first) accept the resignation of third-year manager Eddie Stanky and replace him with his predecessor, Al López, the future Hall of Fame catcher who had managed the ChiSox to nine winning seasons between 1957 and 1965, including the 1959 American League pennant.
  - The New York Yankees acquire 14-year veteran NL reliever Lindy McDaniel, 32, from the San Francisco Giants for right-hander Bill Monbouquette. McDaniel will appear in 265 games for the Yankees over the next 5½ seasons and post a career-best 29 saves in 1970.
- July 14
  - Hank Aaron becomes the eighth player in major league history to reach 500 career homers. The 34-year-old Aaron, in his 15th NL season, victimizes Mike McCormick of the visiting San Francisco Giants and his three-run bomb is the key blow in a 4–2, Atlanta Braves triumph.
  - At Crosley Field, Don Wilson of the Houston Astros strikes out 18 Cincinnati Reds, including eight in a row between the first and third innings. Wilson gains his sixth victory of 1968, 6–1.
- July 20 – The California Angels trade infielder Woodie Held to the Chicago White Sox in exchange for another infielder, Wayne Causey; nine days later, the Angels will sell Causey's contract to the Atlanta Braves.
- July 24 – Future Cooperstown inductee Hoyt Wilhelm, 45, appears in his 907th game as a major-league pitcher, breaking Cy Young's 57-year-old, all-time record.
- July 26 – The Detroit Tigers obtain Wilhelm's White Sox bullpen mate, righty Don McMahon, 38, for the stretch drive. Hurler Dennis Ribant goes to Chicago in return.
- July 29 – George Culver of the Cincinnati Reds faces 34 batters, seven over the limit, but throws 1968's third no-hitter, 6–1 over the Philadelphia Phillies in the nightcap of a Connie Mack Stadium double bill. Culver walks five, a Phillie reaches first on catcher's interference, and the Reds commit three errors behind him. Philadelphia's lone run is unearned.
- July 30 – At Cleveland Municipal Stadium, Washington Senators' shortstop Ron Hansen completes the major leagues' first unassisted triple play since 1927, and the eighth in MLB history. The triple-killing occurs in the second inning and Indians hitter Joe Azcue is the victim. Cleveland wins the game, however, 10–1. Three days after his feat, Washington trades Hansen back to his former team, the White Sox, for Tim Cullen.

=== August ===
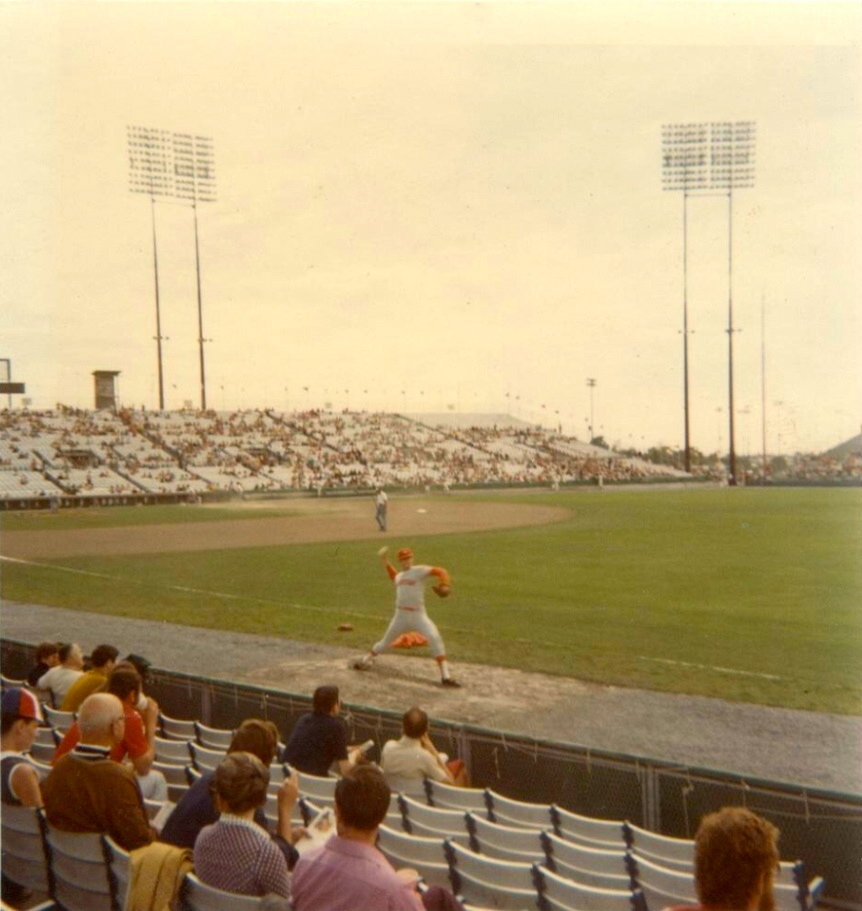
Jarry Park Stadium, the Montreal Expos' makeshift first home, in 1971

- August 8 – Rick Wise of the Philadelphia Phillies one-hits the Los Angeles Dodgers, winning 1–0 at Chavez Ravine. Dick Allen provides the razor-thin winning margin with a solo homer in the ninth inning off Bill Singer. Light-hitting Bart Shirley spoils the no-hitter with a third-inning infield single. Wise will successfully throw a no-no in 1971 against Cincinnati, and fire three other one-hitters during his 18-season MLB career.
- August 14 – It's a red-letter day for Canada's first Major League Baseball franchise, as Montréal's expansion team is officially welcomed into the National League under its principal owner, Charles Bronfman, and key minority partners such as Paul Beaudry and Lorne Webster. The club, which will be named the Montreal Expos after the highly successful 1967 world exposition, will be overseen by president John McHale and general manager Jim Fanning, who formerly worked together with the Milwaukee/Atlanta Braves.
- August 15 – At Fenway Park, a capacity crowd of 35,323 see the Detroit Tigers' Denny McLain win his 25th game (against three losses) with a 4–0 shutout against Jim Lonborg of the Boston Red Sox. It's a battle of American League Cy Young Award winners, pitting 1968's (McLain) against 1967's (Lonborg).
- August 19 – At Shea Stadium, ex-New York Met Ron Hunt singles home Hal Lanier in the visiting half of the 15th inning, scoring the lone run of the game in the San Francisco Giants' 1–0 triumph over the Mets. Neither starting pitcher—Bob Bolin (11 innings) nor Jerry Koosman (12 frames)—gets the decision, as Frank Linzy bests Ron Taylor.
- August 21 – The Pittsburgh Pirates rout the Cincinnati Reds, 19–1, at Crosley Field. The Bucs' 23 hits and 19 runs scored are the most by any MLB team during the "Year of the Pitcher."
- August 23 – The Detroit Tigers and New York Yankees play to a 19-inning, 3–3 tie at Yankee Stadium, the game halted by a 1 a.m. curfew on August 24. Detroit's John Hiller tosses nine shutout innings of relief, while the Yanks' Lindy McDaniel posts seven scoreless frames out of his bullpen. The stats count, but the game is replayed in its entirety on Sunday, August 25 as part of a doubleheader.
- August 26 – The Chicago White Sox fall to the Tigers 3–0 before 42,808 fans at Milwaukee County Stadium in the ninth and final game in the season-long experiment that saw the ChiSox play one home contest against each of their nine American League foes in Milwaukee, which is trying to lure an expansion or relocated franchise. The White Sox, who will finish ninth in 1968, go 1–8 in these games, but draw 265,552 total fans, an average of 29,500 per game. They attract only 538,323 people over their 59 home dates at Comiskey Park, or about 9,125 per date. They decide to continue the Milwaukee experiment in 1969, playing one game against each of their 11 foes in the expanded AL at County Stadium.
- August 29 – Preston Gómez, third-base coach of the Los Angeles Dodgers, is hired as the first manager in the history of the MLB San Diego Padres, set to debut in 1969. On September 5, Gene Mauch, former pilot of the Philadelphia Phillies, becomes the first-ever skipper of the Padres' expansion cohorts, the Montreal Expos.
- August 31 – In a game versus the Atlanta Braves, Pittsburgh Pirates starting pitcher Steve Blass retires the first batter he faces. Manager Larry Shepard comes out, and shifts Blass to left field, replacing Willie Stargell. Shepard then brings in Roy Face to face Félix Millán, who grounds out to shortstop. Face's appearance breaks Walter Johnson's record of most games pitched by a hurler with a single team, which had been 802. Blass then returns to the mound, relieving Face, and the Pirates go on to win 8–0. After the game, the Bucs announce that Face's contract has been sold to the Detroit Tigers.

=== September ===
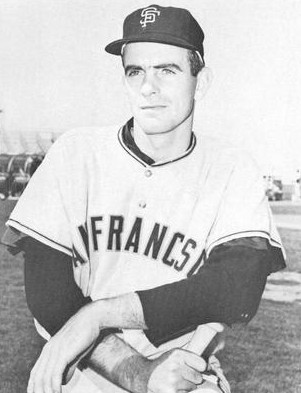
Gaylord Perry in 1965

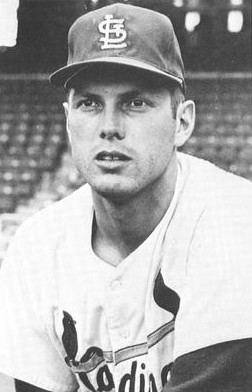
Ray Washburn, also in 1965

- September 7 – Fred Haney, 72, general manager of the California Angels since the team's inception in December 1960, announces his retirement, effective at the end of the season. His successor will be Dick Walsh, former assistant GM of the Los Angeles Dodgers.
- September 9 – Future Hall-of-Fame second baseman Joe Gordon is named the first manager in Kansas City Royals history; coincidentally, he had briefly managed the city's previous franchise, the Athletics, in 1961. The other American League expansion team, the Seattle Pilots, will wait until the conclusion of the 1968 World Series in October before confirming that Joe Schultz, third-base coach for the NL champion St. Louis Cardinals, will be their first-ever pilot.
- September 14 – Denny McLain becomes MLB's first 30-game winner since Dizzy Dean in 1934 as the Detroit Tigers beat the Oakland Athletics, 5–4, at Detroit's Tiger Stadium. Reggie Jackson's home run in the fourth puts the A's ahead 2–0, but Norm Cash answers with a three-run shot. Jackson hits another in the sixth, but the Tigers push across two in the ninth to win. Al Kaline, pinch hitting for McLain, walks and scores the tying run. McLain, who posted a 31–6 record in the regular season, gives up six hits and strikes out ten.
- September 15 – The St. Louis Cardinals clinch their 12th National League pennant and their third since 1964 with a 7–4 win at the Astrodome over the host Houston Astros. Roger Maris hits his 275th, and last, regular-season home run off Don Wilson in the third inning, and Curt Flood racks up five hits in five at bats.
- September 16 – American League president Joe Cronin fires veteran umpires Al Salerno and Bill Valentine, allegedly for poor performance; however, union organizing soon surfaces as the actual reason for the terminations. Cronin's tactics backfire, as AL arbiters—previously not unionized—vote to join with their National League brethren in a new Major League Umpires Association on September 30. The union considers and rejects calling a strike for the 1968 World Series to force Salerno's and Valentine's reinstatement, but the two fired arbiters never regain their jobs.
- September 17
  - The Detroit Tigers (98–54–2) clinch their eighth AL pennant and first in 23 years with a ninth-inning, 2–1 triumph over the New York Yankees at Tiger Stadium. Emergency starter Joe Sparma wins his first game since July 25, throwing a complete-game five-hitter and knocking in Detroit's first run with a single. Their victory sets up a rematch of the 1934 World Series, in which St. Louis' Gashouse Gang defeated the Tigers in seven games.
  - Gaylord Perry of the San Francisco Giants hurls a no-hitter at Candlestick Park as the Giants edge the visiting St. Louis Cardinals and Bob Gibson, 1–0. Ron Hunt's first-inning home run (the second of the only two he will hit on the season and one of only 11 Gibson will allow in 304 2/3 innings) backs Perry, who evens his record at 14–14.
- September 18 – Sixteen hours after Perry's feat, Ray Washburn of the St. Louis Cardinals makes major league history by hurling a second consecutive no-hitter in the same park. Run-scoring hits by Mike Shannon and Curt Flood down the Giants, 2–0. This is the first time in history back-to-back no hitters have been pitched between the same two teams on two consecutive days.
- September 22 – Minnesota Twins utility player César Tovar plays all nine positions, an inning each, against the Oakland Athletics. Duplicating the feat that Bert Campaneris performed three years earlier, Tovar tops Campaneris by starting as pitcher and allows no hits or runs, for a 0.00 earned run average. In the inning, the first man to face Tovar is Campaneris, who fouls out. Tovar then strikes out Reggie Jackson. Tovar is charged with a walk and a balk in the scoreless inning; his other contributions to the 2–1 Minnesota win include a single, a walk, a stolen base and a run scored. He makes five putouts and an assist, with no fielding errors.
- September 24 – Gil Hodges, 44-year-old manager of the New York Mets, suffers a "small" coronary thrombosis in Atlanta during a game against the Braves. Hospitalized, he turns the team over to pitching coach Rube Walker. Hodges will miss the final four games of the 1968 regular season and the National League expansion draft, but return to the Mets' helm in 1969.
- September 28 – Mickey Mantle plays in what will be his 2,401st and final game, eight days after hitting his last home run ending his career with 536. His final MLB appearance occurs at Fenway Park in a 4–3 victory over the Red Sox before 25,534 spectators. He starts the game as the Yankees' first baseman, plays one inning, and bats once against Jim Lonborg—popping out to shortstop Rico Petrocelli—before being replaced in the field by Andy Kosco. Mantle will not announce his retirement until March 1, 1969.
- September 29
  - Carl Yastrzemski of the Boston Red Sox goes 0-for-5 but maintains a .3005 batting average, to win his second straight American League batting crown with the lowest winning average. Yastrzemski is the league's only .300 hitter. Danny Cater of the Oakland Athletics ends second with a .290 average.
  - At Shea Stadium, Dick Allen hits three home runs in the Philadelphia Phillies' 10–3 victory over the New York Mets. He becomes the second player, after Gus Zernial of the Chicago White Sox in 1950, to hit three home runs in his team's regular-season finale. Evan Longoria will join them by hitting three home runs in the Tampa Bay Rays' 2012 regular-season finale.
  - In the franchise's first over-.500 season since 1952, when it played in Philadelphia, the Oakland Athletics finish 82–80 and one game out of the first division. Owner Charles O. Finley celebrates by firing first-year pilot Bob Kennedy and replacing him with Hank Bauer. It's Finley's eighth managerial change in eight full seasons as the Athletics' owner—and it marks the second time he has hired Bauer, who managed for him from June 19, 1961 through 1962.

=== October ===
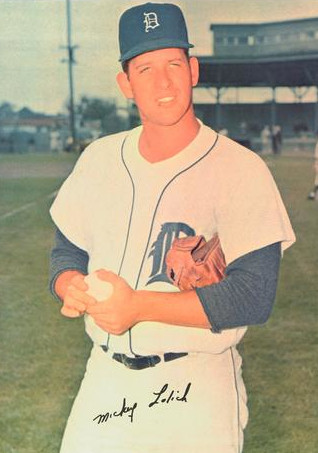
Mickey Lolich in 1966

- October 2 – For the first time in history, two soon-to-be-named MVPs oppose each other in Game 1 of the 1968 World Series. The St. Louis Cardinals' Bob Gibson is nearly untouchable with a Series-record 17 strikeouts and a 4–0 win over Denny McLain and the Detroit Tigers. Detroit manager Mayo Smith moves Gold Glove outfielder Mickey Stanley to shortstop, improving his offense by opening a spot for Al Kaline. After Gibson's dominant effort, Smith tells his team, "You've just seen the best."
- October 6 – In Game 4 at Detroit, Gibson sets another World Series pitching record with his seventh straight Fall Classic victory, again surpassing McLain with a five-hit, ten-strikeout, 10–1 complete game triumph. Lou Brock leads the Redbird offense: three hits, including a home run, a stolen base (his seventh in four games), and four RBI. St. Louis takes a seemingly insurmountable three games to one lead, with Gibson lined up to start a Game 7—but it will be their last victory of 1968.
- October 10 – In Game 7, Mickey Lolich of the Detroit Tigers, pitching on two days rest, wins his third game of the 1968 World Series, as he beats Bob Gibson and the St. Louis Cardinals, 4–1. Lolich brings Detroit its first world championship since 1945. Lolich hurls a five-hitter, and is named Series MVP. Key moments begin in the sixth inning, when Lolich picks Lou Brock and Curt Flood off first base to preserve a scoreless tie. Then, in the seventh, the Tigers have two on and two out when Jim Northrup hits a line drive to center field; Gold-Glover Flood misjudges the ball and starts in, allowing the ball to sail over his head for a triple and break the deadlock. Northrup then scores on Bill Freehan's double for a 3–0 Detroit lead. Each team adds a ninth-inning run to account for the 4–1 final score.
  - It's the first time the Cardinals have lost a seventh game of a World Series. The Tigers become only the third team (after the 1925 Pirates and 1958 Yankees) to rally from a 3–1 deficit to win the Series, four games to three. The Tigers also become the last team to win a Fall Classic between two first-place teams from leagues without divisional play.
- October 11
  - The Minnesota Twins replace manager Cal Ermer with Billy Martin, 40, who had been managing their Triple-A Denver farm club. It's Martin's first MLB managerial opportunity.
  - The San Francisco Giants appoint former MLB pitcher and pitching coach Clyde King, 44, as their new manager. He succeeds Herman Franks, whose Giants finished second in the National League during each of his four seasons as their pilot.
  - One day after the World Series ends, the St. Louis Cardinals make two trades.
    - They deal catcher Johnny Edwards and minor-leaguer Tommy Smith (also a catcher) to the Houston Astros for pitcher Dave Giusti and catcher Dave Adlesh. Giusti will spend only three days on the Cardinal roster before departing in the 1968 NL expansion draft on October 14.
    - The Redbirds also acquire outfielder Vada Pinson, 30, from the Cincinnati Reds for relief pitcher Wayne Granger, 24, and outfielder Bobby Tolan, 22. Pinson is a four-time former NL All-Star and the winner of a Gold Glove Award, but the deal pays off handsomely for Cincinnati when Granger and Tolan post stellar seasons in both 1969 and 1970.
- October 14 – The National League stocks the rosters of its two teams set to debut in 1969, the Montreal Expos and San Diego Padres, with an intraleague expansion draft. The American League does the same for its new teams, the Kansas City Royals and Seattle Pilots, the following day. Ollie Brown (Padres) and Roger Nelson (Royals) are the first overall picks in each circuit.
- October 21
  - Catcher Elston Howard, a 12-time All-Star and four-time World Series champion as a member of the New York Yankees, announces his retirement after almost 1½ seasons with the Boston Red Sox. He soon rejoins the Yankees as their first Black coach and spends 11 more seasons with them, winning two more World Series rings.
  - The Montreal Expos purchase the contract of third baseman Bob Bailey from the Los Angeles Dodgers. Bailey will be a mainstay in the Montreal lineup during the club's first seven years of existence.
  - The Cleveland Indians send lanky first baseman Bill Davis to the San Diego Padres for shortstop and 1965 AL MVP Zoilo Versalles ("PTBNL" added to the deal December 2). San Diego had selected Versalles, 28, in this month's NL expansion draft from the Los Angeles Dodgers, 20th overall.
- October 28
  - Bob Gibson is the BBWAA's unanimous winner of 1968's NL Cy Young Award, capturing all 20 first-place votes. Gibson's 1.12 regular-season earned run average set an enduring MLB record, still intact as of 2026. He also won 24 games, including two in the recently concluded World Series.
  - The world-champion Detroit Tigers release veteran third baseman Eddie Mathews, ending the future Hall-of-Famer's 17-year MLB career. During that time, Mathews socked 512 homers, 493 as a member of the Boston/Milwaukee/Atlanta Braves.

=== November ===
- November 1 – Denny McLain, the last MLB pitcher to win 30 games in a season, is the unanimous American League winner of the Cy Young Award. Four days from now, McLain will also be unanimously anointed the year's Al Most Valuable Player, winning all 20 first-place mentions and 280 total points.
- November 2 – The International Amateur Baseball Tournament kicks off in Mexico City. The competition includes the U.S., Mexican, Cuban, and Puerto Rican national teams, and is held after the 1968 Summer Olympics.
- November 10 – The Mexico City tournament concludes, with the U.S. team, managed by Mic high State coach Danny Litwhiler, defeating Cuba to win the championship.
- November 13 – Bob Gibson of the St. Louis Cardinals follows his Cy Young Award triumph by his selection as the National League's Most Valuable Player, taking 14 of 20 first-place votes and 242 points to Pete Rose's six votes and 205 points.
- November 19 – New York Yankees pitcher Stan Bahnsen, who posted a 17–12 record with 162 strikeouts and a 2.05 ERA, is named American League Rookie of the Year. With 17 of 20 first-place votes, Bahnsen easily outdistances outfielder Del Unser of the Washington Senators, who notches three votes.
- November 20 – Al Campanis succeeds the late Fresco Thompson as head of baseball operations of the Los Angeles Dodgers. His official title is vice president, player personnel, but Campanis will function as the team's general manager until April 1987.
- November 21 – The Cincinnati Reds trade shortstop Leo Cárdenas, a four-time NL All-Star, to the Minnesota Twins for left-hander Jim Merritt.
- November 22 – Cincinnati catcher Johnny Bench (10½ votes) edges New York Mets pitcher Jerry Koosman (9½) to win the National League Rookie of the Year Award. Bench becomes the third member of the Reds in six years to be named the top rookie.

=== December ===
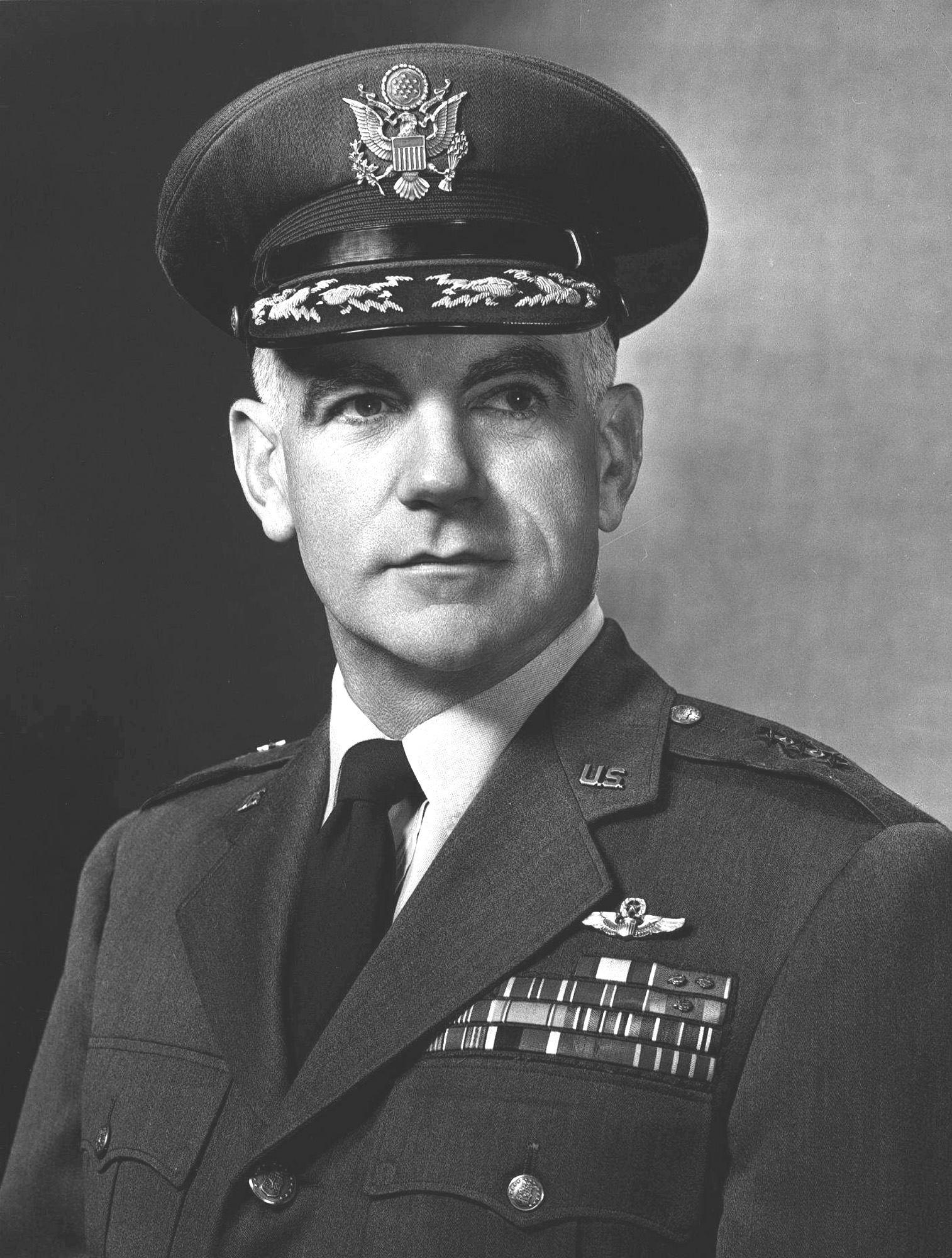
William Eckert, fourth Commissioner of Baseball

- December 3
  - With the 1968 season already famous as "The Year of the Pitcher"—also called the "second Dead Ball Era"—major league owners vote to lower the pitching mound by 5 inches (130 mm) to a height of 10 inches (250 mm) and tighten the strike zone, as they attempt to stimulate offense and run-scoring.
  - Bob Short, Minneapolis businessman and former owner of the Los Angeles Lakers of the NBA, outbids entertainer Bob Hope to purchase the Washington Senators, who had finished last in the ten-team American League and in MLB attendance in 1968.
  - In a four-for-one deal, the St. Louis Cardinals reacquire veteran pitcher Dave Giusti from the newborn San Diego Padres, sending catcher Danny Breeden, third baseman Ed Spiezio, outfielder Ron Davis and pitching prospect Philip Knuckles to San Diego. After being obtained by St. Louis in a trade with the Houston Astros on October 11, Giusti had been the third overall pick in the NL expansion draft three days later.
  - The Philadelphia Phillies purchase the contract of veteran first baseman Deron Johnson from the Atlanta Braves. Johnson will swat 88 homers in 563 games with the Phils.
- December 4
  - In the most impactful trade of the winter meetings, the Baltimore Orioles acquire southpaw pitcher Mike Cuellar from the Houston Astros for outfielder Curt Blefary in a five-player transaction; as an Oriole, Cuellar will win 20 or more games four times, and 18 games twice, between 1969 and 1974.
  - The Astros also trade third baseman Bob Aspromonte, a stalwart since the club's 1962 debut season, to the Atlanta Braves for infielder Orlando "Marty" Martínez.
  - The New York Yankees acquire left-hander Mike Kekich from the Los Angeles Dodgers for outfielder Andy Kosco. Kekich, 23, will put up mediocre numbers (31–32, 4.31 in 125 games) with the Yankees, and will become more famous off the field when, in 1973, he and teammate Fritz Peterson announce they have "swapped" families.
- December 6 – MLB owners fire William Eckert, the fourth Commissioner of Baseball, in office for only three years and three weeks.
- December 12 – The California Angels acquire future Hall-of-Fame knuckleballer Hoyt Wilhelm from the fledgling Kansas City Royals for catcher Dennis Paepke and outfielder Ed Kirkpatrick. Wilhelm, 46, had been selected in October's AL expansion draft.
- December 15 – Al Campanis, the Los Angeles Dodgers' newly installed general manager, sells the contract of his son Jim, a catching prospect, to the Kansas City Royals.

== Births ==
=== January ===
- January 8
  - Paul Carey
  - Brian Johnson
- January 9 – Tom Kramer
- January 11 – Ben Rivera
- January 20 – Ramón Mañón
- January 21
  - Keith Shepherd
  - Tom Urbani
- January 23 – Victor Cole
- January 24 – Ross Powell
- January 27
  - Rusty Meacham
  - Eric Wedge
- January 29 – Kevin Roberson
- January 31 – Steve Phoenix

=== February ===
- February 1 – Kent Mercker
- February 2 – Scott Erickson
- February 5
  - Roberto Alomar
  - Andrés Santana
- February 9
  - Robert Eenhoorn
  - Brad Holman
- February 10
  - Ryan Bowen
  - Eddie Zosky
- February 11 – Dave Swartzbaugh
- February 13 – Matt Mieske
- February 14 – Scott Scudder
- February 15 – Luis Mercedes
- February 18 – Kyle Abbott
- February 22 – Kazuhiro Sasaki
- February 25 – David Hulse
- February 26 – J. T. Snow
- February 27 – Matt Stairs
- February 28 – Mike Milchin

=== March ===
- March 3
  - Bobby Muñoz
  - Scott Radinsky
- March 4
  - Giovanni Carrara
  - Brian Hunter
- March 7
  - Denis Boucher
  - Jeff Kent
- March 8 – Jim Dougherty
- March 11 – Gar Finnvold
- March 15 – Kim Batiste
- March 17
  - Pat Gomez
  - Dan Masteller
- March 19 – Pete Young
- March 22 – Ramón Martínez
- March 26
  - Gerald Alexander
  - Shane Reynolds
  - José Vizcaíno
- March 27 – Tom Quinlan
- March 29 – Juan Bell

=== April ===
- April 1 – Masumi Kuwata
- April 2 – Curt Leskanic
- April 3
  - Tomoaki Kanemoto
  - Mike Lansing
- April 4 – Jim Dedrick
- April 12
  - Cliff Brantley
  - Dave Staton
- April 14 – Jesse Levis
- April 15 – Billy Brewer
- April 19 – Brent Mayne
- April 22 – Mike Bell
- April 23 – Guillermo Velasquez
- April 24 – Todd Jones
- April 27 – Patrick Lennon

=== May ===
- May 2 – Paul Emmel
- May 3 – Iván Cruz
- May 4 – Eddie Pérez
- May 6 – Phil Clark
- May 9 – Glenn Sutko
- May 11 – Mike Garcia
- May 12 – Mark Clark
- May 13 – Braulio Castillo
- May 14 – Mark Dalesandro
- May 18 – Clemente Álvarez
- May 19 – Alan Zinter
- May 21
  - Greg O'Halloran
  - Steve Pegues
- May 22 – Al Levine
- May 24 – Jerry Dipoto
- May 25 – Will Pennyfeather
- May 27
  - Jeff Bagwell
  - Frank Thomas
- May 30 – Mike Oquist

=== June ===
- June 8 – Dave Mlicki
- June 12 – Scott Aldred
- June 30 – Dan Peltier

=== July ===
- July 3 – Mike Farmer
- July 7
  - Mike Busch
  - Chuck Knoblauch
- July 8 – Garland Kiser
- July 14 – Derrick May
- July 18 – Rolando Arrojo
- July 23 – Bubba Carpenter
- July 24 – Rob Lukachyk
- July 26 – Mike Mohler
- July 27 – Tom Goodwin

=== August ===
- August 1
  - Brian Bohanon
  - Shigetoshi Hasegawa
- August 2 – Frank Cimorelli
- August 3
  - Rod Beck
  - Kevin Morton
- August 4 – Chris Hook
- August 5 – John Olerud
- August 6 – Darryl Scott
- August 9 – Mike Shildt
- August 12
  - Reggie Harris
  - Tony Longmire
- August 20 – Kevin Rogers
- August 21
  - Mike Misuraca
  - Tuffy Rhodes
- August 22 – Gary Scott
- August 24 – Tim Salmon
- August 26 – Brian Bark
- August 31
  - Pat Howell
  - Hideo Nomo

=== September ===
- September 4 – Mike Piazza
- September 6 – Pat Meares
- September 7 – Julio Peguero
- September 12 – Masao Kida
- September 13
  - Erik Bennett
  - Denny Neagle
  - Bernie Williams
- September 14 – Doug Eddings
- September 15 – Rich Robertson
- September 16 – Mark Acre
- September 19 – Pedro Muñoz
- September 20 – Donnie Elliott
- September 23 – Rodney Bolton
- September 25 – Reggie Jefferson
- September 26 – Brian Shouse
- September 28 – Keiichi Yabu
- September 29 – Derek Parks

=== October ===
- October 1 – Jeff Patterson
- October 2 – Greg Gibson
- October 3 – Jim Byrd
- October 5
  - Alex Diaz
  - Ron Kulpa
- October 6 – Ed Pierce
- October 7
  - Milt Cuyler
  - Butch Henry
- October 13 – Julio Valera
- October 14 – Zak Shinall
- October 15 – Matt Dunbar
- October 20 – Rudy Seánez
- October 22 – Keith Osik
- October 24 – Ken Ryan
- October 26 – Scott Lydy
- October 30
  - Greg McCarthy
  - Erik Plantenberg
- October 31 – Eddie Taubensee

=== November ===
- November 3 – Paul Quantrill
- November 4
  - Carlos Baerga
  - Domingo Cedeño
  - Osvaldo Fernández
- November 6 – Chad Curtis
- November 7 – Russ Springer
- November 8 – José Offerman
- November 9 – Andy Carter
- November 12
  - Randy Knorr
  - Sammy Sosa
- November 13
  - Pat Hentgen
  - Mark Kiefer
- November 14 – Kent Bottenfield
- November 16 – Chris Haney
- November 18
  - Clay Bellinger
  - Gary Sheffield
  - Phil Stidham
  - Darrell Whitmore
- November 19 – Luis Raven
- November 20
  - Chuck Ricci
  - Steve Schrenk
- November 24
  - Dave Hansen
  - Steve Mintz
- November 25
  - John Johnstone
  - Shingo Takatsu
- November 26 – Héctor Wagner
- November 28
  - Pedro Astacio
  - Terry Burrows
  - Scott Sheldon
- November 29
  - Allen Battle
  - Pedro Martínez
- November 30 – Heath Haynes

=== December ===
- December 2 – Darryl Kile
- December 8 – Mike Mussina
- December 11 – Derek Bell
- December 17 – Curtis Pride
- December 22
  - David Nied
  - Jim Reynolds
- December 23 – Rick White
- December 24 – Kirt Ojala
- December 25 – Scott Bullett
- December 27 – Dean Palmer
- December 29 – James Mouton

== Deaths ==
=== January ===
- January 2 – Tommy Warren, 50, left-handed pitcher and pinch hitter who appeared in 41 total games (22 on the mound) for the wartime 1944 Brooklyn Dodgers.
- January 3 – Rich Gee, 73, catcher in the Negro leagues between 1923 and 1929, mainly as a member of the New York Lincoln Giants of the Eastern Colored League.
- January 5 – Julius Osley, 52, pitcher for the 1937–1938 Birmingham Black Barons of the Negro American League.
- January 9 – Ed Strelecki, 62, pitcher in 42 games for the 1928–1929 St. Louis Browns and 1931 Cincinnati Reds.
- January 11 – George Hunter, 80, outfielder and left-handed pitcher who appeared in 45 games for the 1909 Brooklyn Superbas.
- January 13
  - Ernie Herbert, 80, pitcher in six games for the 1913 Cincinnati Reds and 29 games for the 1914–1915 St. Louis Terriers of the Federal League, then considered an "outlaw" circuit but now classified as a major league.
  - Marty Lang, 62, left-handed pitcher who had a two-game "cup of coffee" with 1930 Pittsburgh Pirates.
  - Art Schwind, 78, third baseman who appeared in one game for the Boston Braves on October 3, 1912.
- January 14 – Bill Black, 68, pinch hitter and second baseman in five games for the 1924 Chicago White Sox.
- January 16 – Elias "Liz" Funk, 63, outfielder and pinch hitter in 123 career games for the 1929 New York Yankees, 1930 Detroit Tigers and 1932–1933 Chicago White Sox.
- January 23 – Patsy Flaherty, 91, left-handed spitball pitcher between 1899 and 1913 with Louisville, Pittsburgh, Boston and Philadelphia of the National League (NL) and Chicago of the American League (AL); led AL in games lost (25) in 1903, then posted a 19–9 mark for the NL Pirates the following season.
- January 26
  - John Kobs, 69, head baseball coach of Michigan State University from 1925 through 1963; his Spartans teams won 576 games during his tenure.
  - Eddie Phillips, 66, catcher in 312 games for the Boston Braves, Detroit Tigers, Pittsburgh Pirates, New York Yankees, Washington Senators and Cleveland Indians between 1924 and 1935; member of 1932 World Series champion Yankees.

=== February ===
- February 3 – Jake Pitler, 73, Brooklyn Dodger coach (1947 to 1957) who in 11 seasons was part of six National League pennant-winners and 1955 World Series champions; former minor league manager; in his playing days, second baseman who appeared in 111 games for the 1917–1918 Pirates.
- February 6 – Leroy Matlock, 60, southpaw hurler and three-time All-Star who twice led the Negro National League in winning percentage (1931, 1935) and once in games won (1936), playing primarily for the Pittsburgh Crawfords and St. Louis Stars; also appeared as an outfielder and first baseman.
- February 7 – Ollie Marquardt, 65, second baseman in 17 games for the 1931 Boston Red Sox; later a successful minor league manager.
- February 8 – Joe Matthews, 69, southpaw who pitched in three games for the Boston Braves in September 1922.
- February 9 – Lou Bruce, 91, Native American of the Mohawk people who appeared in 30 games for the 1904 Philadelphia Athletics.
- February 11 – Dorothea Downs, 50, All-American Girls Professional Baseball League player.
- February 12 – Johnny Siegle, 93, outfielder for the Cincinnati Reds who played 39 games in 1905 and 1906.
- February 14 – Bill Lelivelt, 83, Dutch-born pitcher who appeared in five total games for the Detroit Tigers of 1909 and 1910.
- February 18 – Ben Egan, 84, backup catcher for Philadelphia (1908 and 1912) and Cleveland (1914–1915) of the American League who played in 122 career games.
- February 23 – Hank Schreiber, 76, infielder who played a total of 36 games over five abbreviated trials with five teams: the 1914 White Sox, 1917 Braves, 1919 Reds, 1921 Giants and 1926 Cubs.
- February 28 – Lena Blackburne, 81, weak-hitting infielder who played 228 games with five MLB clubs between 1910 and 1928; manager of the Chicago White Sox from July 6, 1928 through 1929; coach for 17 years with three teams, notably the Philadelphia Athletics; scout and minor league manager; originated the practice of rubbing special Delaware River mud on new baseballs to remove their slippery finish; in 1938, he formed a company that as of 2020 still supplied the major and minor leagues with this product.

=== March ===
- March 2 – Phil Slattery, 75, southpaw who hurled eight scoreless innings over three games for the Pittsburgh Pirates in September 1915.
- March 4 – Duke Reilley, 83, outfielder for the 1909 Cleveland Naps who played in 20 games.
- March 7 – LeRoy Taylor, 65, outfielder who played in the Negro leagues and for barnstorming black teams from 1925 to 1936 for six clubs, most prominently the Kansas City Monarchs.
- March 9 – Jim Callahan, 87, outfielder who appeared in one game for the New York Giants on May 25, 1902.
- March 14 – Paul Carpenter, 73, pitcher who worked in five games for the 1916 Pittsburgh Pirates.
- March 15 – Allie Watt, 68, Washington Senators second baseman who doubled in his only MLB at bat (and game played) on October 3, 1920.
- March 18 – Heinie Meine, 71, nicknamed "The Count of Luxemburg", pitcher who played all but one of his 165 MLB games for the 1929–1934 Pittsburgh Pirates; tied for the National League lead in games won (19) in 1931.
- March 20 – Clyde "Hardrock" Shoun, 56, left-handed hurler in 454 games for the Chicago Cubs, St. Louis Cardinals, Cincinnati Reds, Boston Braves and Chicago White Sox between 1935–1944 and 1946–1949; on May 15, 1944, as a Red, he authored a no-hit, no-run game against the Braves.
- March 24 – Ovid Nicholson, 79, outfielder who went 5-for-11 (.455) in his six-game cup of coffee with the 1912 Pittsburgh Pirates.
- March 29 – Buddy Napier, 78, pitcher in 39 total games for the 1912 St. Louis Browns, 1918 Chicago Cubs and 1920–1921 Cincinnati Reds.
- March 30 – Bernie Hungling, 72, catcher for the Brooklyn Robins (1922–1923) and St. Louis Browns (1930) who appeared in 51 games.
- March 31 – Grover Lowdermilk, 83, pitcher who appeared in 122 games for six clubs between 1908 and 1920, chiefly the St. Louis Browns and Chicago White Sox.

=== April ===
- April 1 – Tom Cantwell, 79, Cincinnati Reds pitcher who appeared in eight games in 1909 and 1910; brother of Mike Cantwell.
- April 7
  - Mahlon Higbee, 68, outfielder for the 1922 New York Giants who played in three late-season contests, going four-for-ten (.400) with a home run in his only opportunity in the majors.
  - Jesse Houston, 58, pitcher who led the Negro American League in complete games in 1937 as a member of the Cincinnati Tigers; also played for the Chicago American Giants and Homestead Grays through 1941.
- April 8 – Bob Pepper, 72, who pitched in one game for the Philadelphia Athletics on July 23, 1915.
- April 12 – Frank Sigafoos, 64, infielder who played 55 career games for the 1926 Athletics, 1929 Detroit Tigers, 1929 Chicago White Sox and 1931 Cincinnati Reds.
- April 14 – Al Benton, 57, pitcher who won 98 games for four American League teams over 14 seasons between 1934 and 1952, principally for the Tigers; only pitcher to face Babe Ruth (1934) and Mickey Mantle (1952).
- April 16 – John Michaelson, 74, the only native of Finland to play in the majors (as of 2023); pitched in two games for the Chicago White Sox in August 1921.
- April 17 – Bill Engeln, 69, National League umpire from 1952 to 1956, working 751 regular-season games and 1953 All-Star game.
- April 19
  - Tommy Bridges, 61, six-time All-Star pitcher who won 194 games for the Detroit Tigers (1930–1943 and 1945–1946), including three 20-win seasons; posted a 4–1 World Series record and won rings in 1935 and 1945.
  - Allan Travers, 75, one of the Tigers' replacement players hastily recruited on May 18, 1912, to face the Philadelphia Athletics during the wildcat strike by Detroit players protesting the suspension of teammate Ty Cobb; Travers was the starting pitcher for his all-amateur makeshift squad, going eight innings and allowing 26 hits and 24 runs (only 14 earned); ordained as a Jesuit priest in 1926, thus becoming the only Roman Catholic clergyman to appear in an MLB game.
- April 21 – Fred Applegate, 88, pitcher who appeared in three games for the 1904 Athletics.
- April 22 – Melvin Coleman, 57, shortstop/catcher for the 1937 Birmingham Black Barons and 1944 Atlanta Black Crackers.
- April 25 – Billy Kelsey, 88, catcher who went two-for-five (.400) in two games played for the Pittsburgh Pirates in October 1907.
- April 27 – Paul Kardow, 52, relief pitcher who made two appearances for the 1936 Cleveland Indians.
- April 29 – Terris McDuffie, 59, Negro league pitcher in a long career that spanned from 1930 through 1954, playing for several teams in different leagues across the United States, Canada and Latin America.

=== May ===
- May 3 – Ray Gardner, 66, shortstop who played 115 games for the Cleveland Indians in 1931–1932.
- May 15 – Bill Drescher, 46, catcher who appeared in 46 games for the New York Yankees from 1944 to 1946.
- May 16 – Bill Brandt, 53, pitcher who worked in 34 career games for the 1941–1943 Pittsburgh Pirates.
- May 23 – Hubert Lockhart, 69, southpaw who pitched for the 1923–1928 Atlantic City Bacharach Giants of the Eastern Colored League and 1929 Chicago American Giants of the Negro National League; led ECL in winning percentage (.778) in 1923.
- May 24 – Lloyd Russell, 55, star Baylor University athlete and a shortstop in baseball, whose MLB tenure consisted of two games as a pinch runner for the 1938 Cleveland Indians.
- May 26
  - Chippy Gaw, 76, pitcher in six games for the 1920 Chicago Cubs.
  - Doc Ayers, 77, spitball pitcher who worked in 299 games for the Washington Senators and Detroit Tigers between 1913 and 1921.
- May 27
  - Herman Bronkie, 83, third baseman and second baseman who played in only 122 games over seven seasons spread over 13 years for four teams, most notably for the 1919 and 1922 St. Louis Browns.
  - Rip Collins, 72, four-sport star at Texas A&M University and pitcher in the American League from 1920 to 1931; won 108 career games for the New York Yankees, Boston Red Sox, Detroit Tigers and St. Louis Browns; member of the 1921 AL champion Yankees.
  - Charlie Jackson, 74, outfielder in one game for 1915 Chicago White Sox and 41 contests for 1917 Pittsburgh Pirates.

=== June ===
- June 6 – C. B. Burns, 89, pinch hitter who went one-for-one (1.000) in his only at bat as a member of the American League's original edition of Baltimore Orioles on August 19, 1902.
- June 10 – Curly Brown, 79, left-handed pitcher who made 28 total appearances for the 1911–1913 St. Louis Browns and 1915 Cincinnati Reds.
- June 11
  - Dan Boone, 73, pitcher for the Philadelphia Athletics, Detroit Tigers and Cleveland Indians who appeared in 42 games from 1920 through 1923.
  - Bill Regan, 69, second baseman for the Boston Red Sox (1926–1930) and Pittsburgh Pirates (1931), who became the first player in Red Sox history to hit two home runs in the same inning (1928), a mark only matched by one man, Ellis Burks, 62 years later.
- June 12 – Clarence Orme, 69, second baseman for the 1920 Kansas City Monarchs of the Negro National League.
- June 15 – Sam Crawford, 88, Hall of Fame right fielder for the Cincinnati Reds (1899–1902) and Detroit Tigers (1903–1917), a lifetime .309 hitter who hit a record 312 triples, led both leagues in home runs, and retired with the fifth-most RBI in history and 2,961 career hits.
- June 18 – Lloyd Bishop, 78, pitcher in three games for the 1914 Cleveland Naps of the American League.
- June 25
  - Grant Bowler, 60, pitcher who worked in 17 contests for the Chicago White Sox in 1931 and 1932.
  - Dan Dugan, 61, left-handed pitcher who worked in 20 games for the White Sox in 1928 and 1929.
- June 29 – Paddy Driscoll, 73, second baseman who batted only .107 in 13 games for the 1917 Chicago Cubs, but became well-known as a player and coach in the National Football League for over forty years.
- June 30 – Ned Porter, 62, pitcher who worked in three games for the 1926–1927 New York Giants.

=== July ===
- July 1 – Dave Barbee, 63, outfielder who appeared in 116 career games for the 1926 Philadelphia Athletics and 1932 Pittsburgh Pirates.
- July 3 – Pat Simmons, 59, pitcher who played from 1928 to 1929 for the Boston Red Sox.
- July 4 – John Quinn, 70, American League umpire from 1935 to 1942 who officiated in 1,247 league contests and 1937 All-Star game.
- July 6 – Albert Youngblood, 68, Washington Senators relief pitcher who worked in two games during the 1922 season.
- July 8
  - Dusty Boggess, 64, National League umpire for 18 seasons (1944–1948 and 1950–1962) who worked in four World Series, five All-Star games, and 2,591 NL tilts.
  - Nap Shea, 94, diminutive catcher (he stood 5 feet 5 inches (1.65 m) tall and weighed 155 pounds (70 kg)) who appeared for two games for the Phillies in September 1902.
- July 9 – Hap Collard, 69, pitcher in 35 career games for the 1927–1928 Cleveland Indians and 1930 Philadelphia Phillies.
- July 12 – Kettle Wirts, 70, catcher who appeared 49 games over four seasons (1921 to 1924) for the Chicago Cubs and the crosstown White Sox.
- July 15 – Eddie Kearse, 52, catcher who played in 11 games for 1942 New York Yankees.
- July 17
  - Norm Lehr, 67, pitcher who worked in four games for the 1926 Cleveland Indians.
  - Ken Sears, 51, catcher who appeared in 60 games for 1943 Yankees and seven more for 1946 St. Louis Browns; son of NL umpire Ziggy Sears.
- July 21 – Ham Wade, 88, outfielder who appeared in one game and had one at-bat (he was hit by a pitch) on September 9, 1907, as a member of the New York Giants.
- July 27
  - Babe Adams, 86, pitcher who won 194 games for the Pittsburgh Pirates; the only member of their championship teams in both 1909 and 1925, he won three games in the 1909 World Series.
  - Jack Redmond, 57, catcher with 1936 Washington Senators who played in 22 games.
  - Howie Storie, 57, backup catcher who appeared in a dozen games with the Boston Red Sox in 1931 and 1932.
  - Dave Thomas, 63, brilliant defensive first baseman who played in the Negro leagues between 1929 and 1946, most prominently for the New York Cubans and Birmingham Black Barons.
- July 29 – Bill Hart, 55, third baseman and shortstop who appeared in 95 games for the Brooklyn Dodgers during the wartime seasons of 1943 to 1945.

=== August ===
- August 3 – John Jenkins, 72, infielder and pinch hitter in five contests for 1922 Chicago White Sox.
- August 10 – Charlie Boardman, 75, pitcher in a total of seven games over three seasons (1913 to 1915) for the Philadelphia Athletics and St. Louis Browns.
- August 13 – Lefty Guise, 59, knuckleball-throwing pitcher who appeared in two September games for pennant-bound 1940 Cincinnati Reds.
- August 17 – Forrest More, 86, pitcher who went 2–10 (4.74 ERA) in 25 games for St. Louis and Boston of the National League in 1909.
- August 22 – Heinie Groh, 78, third baseman who played in 1,676 games for the New York Giants, Cincinnati Reds and Pittsburgh Pirates between 1912 and 1927; led the National League in hits, runs and walks once each and in doubles twice, widely known for his "bottle bat".
- August 23 – Dutch Henry, 66, left-handed pitcher who appeared in 164 career games between 1921 and 1930 for the St. Louis Browns, Brooklyn Robins, New York Giants and Chicago White Sox.
- August 24 – Dolly Stark, 70, NL umpire for 12 seasons (1928–1935 and 1937–1940) who worked in two World Series, and later became a broadcaster.
- August 26 – John Kroner, 59, infielder who played 223 total games for the 1935–1936 Boston Red Sox and 1937–1938 Cleveland Indians
- August 29 – Paul Howard, 84, outfielder who played in six games for the 1909 Boston Red Sox.
- August 31 – Jay Kirke, 80, legendary minor-league hitter who batted .301 in 320 major-league games with the Detroit Tigers (1910), Boston Rustlers/Braves (1911–1913), Cleveland Naps/Indians (1914–1915), and New York Giants (1918).

=== September ===
- September 2
  - Lee Meyer, 80, shortstop who played nine games for the 1909 Brooklyn Superbas.
  - Nish Williams, 64, catcher/outfielder who had a ten-year career (1930–1939) in the Negro leagues; stepfather of Donn Clendenon.
- September 3 – Tony DeFate, 68, infielder for both the St. Louis Cardinals (14 games) and Detroit Tigers (three games) in 1917.
- September 4 – Ernie Orsatti, 65, outfielder in 701 career games, all with the Cardinals (1927–1935); batted .306 lifetime; regular center fielder for the 1934 "Gashouse Gang"; appeared in four World Series (1928, 1930, 1931 and 1934), winning rings in 1931 and 1934.
- September 8 – Bill Kalfass, 52, southpaw who hurled in three games for the 1937 Philadelphia Athletics.
- September 12
  - Charles Conway, 82, outfielder who appeared in two games for Washington of the American League in April 1912.
  - Don Rudolph, 37, left-handed pitcher who appeared in 124 games for the Chicago White Sox (1957–1959), Cincinnati Reds (1959), Cleveland Indians (1962) and Washington Senators (1962–1964).
- September 14 – Hans Lobert, 86, third baseman for five National League clubs from 1903 to 1917; later a coach (1934–1941 and 1943–1944), manager (of the 1942 Philadelphia Phillies), and scout (1945–1967).
- September 16 – Henry Bostick, 73, third baseman who played two games for the Philadelphia Athletics in May 1915.
- September 17 – Elmer Pence, 68, outfielder who played one inning of one game for the Chicago White Sox on August 23, 1922.
- September 18 – Rip Wheeler, 70, pitched in 34 games for the Pittsburgh Pirates and Chicago Cubs from 1921 to 1924.
- September 25 – Ken Holloway, 71, pitcher who worked in 285 games for the Detroit Tigers, Cleveland Indians and New York Yankees between 1922 and 1930.
- September 26 – Bud Clancy, 68, first baseman who played in 522 contests over nine seasons between 1924 and 1934 for the Chicago White Sox, Brooklyn Dodgers and Philadelphia Phillies.

=== October ===
- October 5 – Hal Bevan, 37, third baseman and pinch hitter in 15 career games for the Boston Red Sox (1952), Philadelphia (1952) and Kansas City Athletics (1955), and Cincinnati Reds (1961); despite his brief tenure with 1961 Reds, featured in relief pitcher Jim Brosnan's classic memoir, Pennant Race.
- October 14 – Lynn Brenton, 79, pitcher who appeared in 34 total games for both of Ohio's MLB teams: Cleveland (1913, 1915) and Cincinnati (1920–1921).
- October 16 – Ellis Kinder, 54, pitcher who fashioned a 102–71 record in 484 appearances for the St. Louis Browns (1946–1947), Boston Red Sox (1948–1955), St. Louis Cardinals (1956) and Chicago White Sox (1956–1957); excelled as both a starter (won 23 games in 1949) and reliever (led American League in saves in 1951 and 1953).
- October 20 – Turner Barber, 75, outfielder who played in 491 games for the Washington Senators, Chicago Cubs and Brooklyn Robins between 1915 and 1923.
- October 21 – Jack Killilay, 81, pitcher in 14 games for the 1911 Boston Red Sox.
- October 23
  - Jack Bliss, 86, catcher for St. Louis Cardinals who appeared in 251 games between 1908 and 1912.
  - Mike Kelly, 72, minor-league catcher, first baseman and manager who spent seven years as a major-league coach for the Chicago White Sox (1930–1931), Chicago Cubs (1934), Boston Bees (1938–1939) and Pittsburgh Pirates (1940–1941).
- October 28 – Bullet Campbell, 72, pitcher for the Hilldale Club of the Eastern Colored League (1924–1927) and New York Lincoln Giants of the ECL (1928) and American Negro League (1929).
- October 29 – Bill Hohman, 64, Philadelphia Phillies outfielder who played in seven games during August and September of 1927.
- October 31
  - Ralph Glaze, 87, pitcher in 61 games for the Boston Americans between 1906 and 1908; later a head football coach at several prominent U.S. colleges.
  - Hub Perdue, 86, pitcher who appeared in 161 career games between 1911 and 1915 for Boston and St. Louis of the National League.

=== November ===
- November 4 – Vern Stephens, 48, eight-time All-Star shortstop for the St. Louis Browns (1941–1947 and 1953), Boston Red Sox (1948–1952), Chicago White Sox (1953 and 1955) and Baltimore Orioles (1954–1955) who led or co-led the American League in RBI three times (1944, 1949 and 1950) and led the AL in home runs once (1945).
- November 5 – Wally Mattick, 81, center fielder in 169 career games for the Chicago White Sox from 1912 to 1913, and briefly with the St. Louis Cardinals in 1918; father of Bobby Mattick.
- November 6 – Earl Gurley, outfielder, first baseman and southpaw pitcher for seven clubs in the Negro leagues, chiefly the Memphis Red Sox, between 1922 and 1932.
- November 12 – Dutch Schirick, 78, pinch hitter in one game for the 1914 St. Louis Browns who later became a politician and judge in New York state.
- November 14 – "Wee Willie" Sherdel, 72, left-handed pitcher who won 165 games (losing 146) for the St. Louis Cardinals (1918–1930 and 1932) and Boston Braves (1931–1932); member of 1926 world champions.
- November 17 – Earl Hamilton, 77, pitcher who appeared in 410 games in MLB between 1911 and 1924, mostly with the St. Louis Browns and Pittsburgh Pirates; later a minor league team owner.
- November 20
  - George Maisel, 76, outfielder for the 1913 St. Louis Browns, 1916 Detroit Tigers and 1921–1922 Chicago Cubs; brother of Fritz Maisel.
  - Fresco Thompson, 66, second baseman and front-office executive; played 669 games between 1925 and 1934 for Pittsburgh, New York, Philadelphia and Brooklyn of the National League, then became a minor league manager; in 1946, began a 23-year executive career with the Brooklyn/Los Angeles Dodgers as assistant farm system director until his promotion to vice president and farm director in 1950; after almost 18 years in that job, he served as Dodgers' executive vp and general manager from June 4, 1968 until his death.
- November 24 – Dearie Mulvey, 70, co-owner of the Dodgers from 1938 until her death; with her husband, retained a 25 percent share after Walter O'Malley obtained controlling interest in 1950; daughter of Stephen McKeever.
- November 27 – Ed Fernandes, 50, catcher who appeared in 42 MLB games for 1940 Pittsburgh Pirates and 1946 Chicago White Sox.

=== December ===
- December 2 – Pete Sims, 77, pitcher who appeared in three games in September 1915 for the St. Louis Browns.
- December 4 – Emil Yde, 68, pitcher in 141 games for the Pittsburgh Pirates (1924–1927) and Detroit Tigers (1929); led National League in winning percentage (16–3, .842) and shutouts (four) as a rookie in 1924; member of 1925 World Series champions.
- December 6 – Fats Jenkins, 70, outfielder who played in Negro leagues and for barnstorming teams between 1920 and 1940; two-time All-Star who, despite nickname, weighed 165 pounds (75 kg); also played professional basketball.
- December 8 – Benn Karr, 75, pitcher for the Boston Red Sox (1920–1922) and Cleveland Indians (1925–1927) who appeared in 177 career games.
- December 12 – Ty Tyson, 80, broadcaster and legendary early play-by-play voice of the Detroit Tigers, calling games on radio (1927–1942 and 1951–1953) and television (1947–1950).
- December 15 – Jim McLaughlin, 66, third baseman who went hitless in his lone MLB at bat for the St. Louis Browns on April 18, 1932.
- December 17 – Hank Severeid, 77, catcher for the Cincinnati Reds, St. Louis Browns, Washington Senators and New York Yankees between 1911 and 1926, hitting .289 in 1,390 games.
- December 22
  - Benny Bengough, 70, catcher who played 411 games for the New York Yankees (1923–1930) and St. Louis Browns (1931–1932) and member of three World Series champions (1923, 1927, 1928); later spent 20 years as a coach in the majors, 14 of them for the Philadelphia Phillies.
  - Ike Powers, 62, pitcher who appeared in 20 games for the 1927–1928 Philadelphia Athletics.
- December 24 – Johnnie Heving, 72, catcher for the St. Louis Browns, Boston Red Sox and Philadelphia Athletics between 1920 and 1932 who appeared in 399 career contests.
- December 25 – Roosevelt Tate, 57, outfielder who played in the Negro Southern League (1932) and Negro American League (1937) in 41 games for five teams.
- December 28 – Roosevelt Davis, 64, pitcher for over a dozen teams in four different Negro leagues between 1924 and 1945; led Negro National League in games won (16) in 1925 and winning percentage (8–0, 1.000) in 1928, and the Negro American League in earned run average (1.65) in 1945.
- December 30 – Dick Marlowe, 39, pitcher who worked in 98 games between 1951 and 1956, all but one of them as a member of the Detroit Tigers.
- December 31 – Anastasio Santaella, versatile Cuban-born infielder/outfielder for the 1935–1936 New York Cubans of the Negro National League; although some sources list his date of death as "unknown," it is reported by Baseball Reference as occurring on this date in Mexico City at age 65.
