= Hal Gilson =

American baseball player (1942–2022)

- Pitcher
- Born: February 9, 1942; Los Angeles, California, U.S.
- Died: June 20, 2022 (aged 80); Scottsdale, Arizona, U.S.
- Batted: Right Threw: Left

MLB debut
- April 14, 1968, for the St. Louis Cardinals

Last MLB appearance
- July 27, 1968, for the Houston Astros

MLB statistics
- Win–loss record: 0–2
- Earned run average: 4.97
- Strikeouts: 20
- Stats at Baseball Reference

Teams
- St. Louis Cardinals (1968); Houston Astros (1968)

Harold "Hal" Gilson (February 9, 1942 – June 20, 2022) was an American Major League Baseball pitcher who played for the St. Louis Cardinals and Houston Astros in 1968.

== Career ==
Nicknamed "Lefty", he was originally signed by the Chicago Cubs in 1961 and was traded to the Cardinals on April 7, 1965, with Bobby Pfeil for Bob Humphreys.

He made his big league debut on April 14, 1968, against the team with which he had originally signed, the Cubs. Ernie Banks was the first batter Gilson ever faced — Banks reached base on an error. Overall, Gilson allowed a hit and walked one in two innings in his big league debut, but did not give up a single run. Overall with the Cardinals in 1968, he posted a 4.57 ERA in 13 games.

He was traded along with Dick Simpson from the Cardinals to the Astros for Ron Davis before the trade deadline on June 15, 1968. He played in only two games with the Astros, posting an ERA of 7.36.

Overall, Gilson posted an 0–2 record in 15 big league games. In 25 1/3 innings, he allowed 34 hits, one home run (to Bob Bailey) 15 runs, 14 earned runs, and 12 walks. He finished 7 games, saved 2 and he struck out 20 batters. His ERA was 4.97.

Although Gilson finished with an unimpressive ERA (especially in 1968, when the league ERA was under 3.00), he started off his career not allowing a single run in his first six appearances. His streak was blown when he allowed five runs in 2 1/3 innings against the Los Angeles Dodgers on May 21.

He played his final game on July 27, 1968, against the San Francisco Giants.

== Death ==
Harold Gilson died on June 20, 2022, in Scottsdale, Arizona, from a major stroke.
