= Leon McFadden (American football) =

American football player (born 1990)

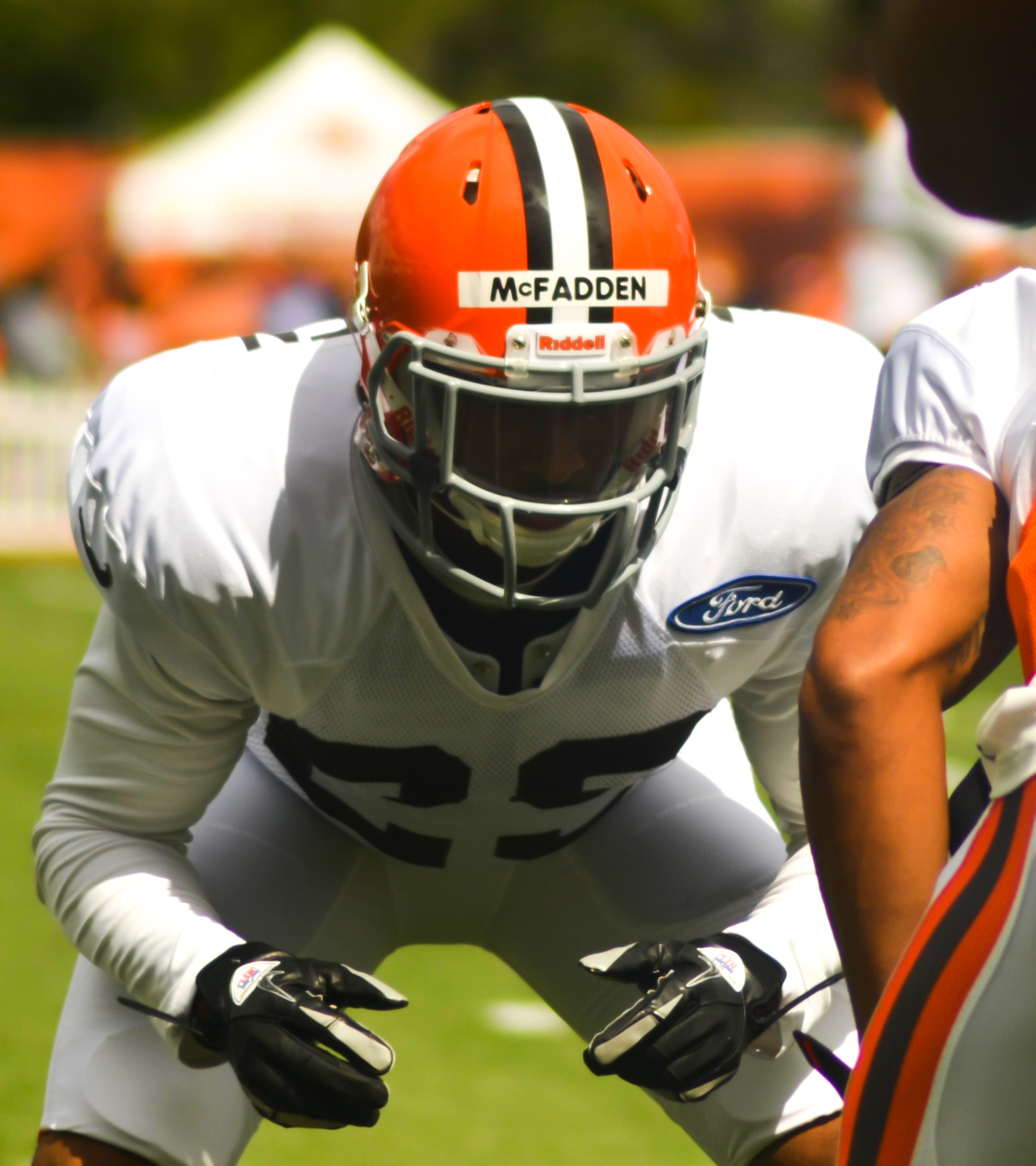
- McFadden with the Cleveland Browns in 2013

No. 29, 30, 37, 23
- Position: Cornerback

Personal information
- Born: October 26, 1990 (age 36); Inglewood, California, U.S.
- Listed height: 5 ft 10 in (1.78 m)
- Listed weight: 190 lb (86 kg)

Career information
- High school: St. John Bosco (Bellflower, California)
- College: San Diego State (2009–2012)
- NFL draft: 2013: 3rd round, 68th overall pick

Career history
- Cleveland Browns (2013); New York Jets (2014); San Francisco 49ers (2014); Arizona Cardinals (2015)*; New York Giants (2015); Dallas Cowboys (2016); Atlanta Falcons (2017)
- * Offseason or practice squad member only

Awards and highlights
- 3× First-team All-MWC (2010, 2011, 2012)

Career NFL statistics
- Total tackles: 35
- Pass deflections: 2
- Stats at Pro Football Reference

Leon McFadden Jr. (born October 26, 1990) is an American former professional football player who was a cornerback in the National Football League (NFL). He was selected by the Cleveland Browns in the third round of the 2013 NFL draft. He played college football for the San Diego State Aztecs.

== Early life ==
McFadden attended St. John Bosco High School in Bellflower, California, and played high school football for the Bosco Braves. As a senior, he recorded 32 receptions for an average of 16.3 yards per catch, 7 touchdowns, 48 tackles and 4 interceptions, while being selected to the Trinity League first-team defense. Against Lutheran High School, he had a season-high 7 receptions for 108 yards.

He was also a standout athlete for the St. John Bosco High School track team. He was timed at 10.9 seconds in the 100 meters in 2008. He had a career-best leap of 6.46 meters in the long jump.

== College career ==
McFadden accepted a football scholarship from San Diego State University to play as a wide receiver, but was switched to cornerback. As a true freshman, he started 6 games (including the first 5) out of 12, posting 26 tackles, one sack, one interception and 2 blocked extra points. Against Southern Utah University, he blocked a kick and returned it after a lateral for a defensive extra point.

As a sophomore, he was named a regular starter at cornerback and also served as the punt returner. He registered 55 tackles (third on the team), 7 tackles for loss (third on the team), 10 passes defensed and 2 interceptions.

As a junior, he had 46 tackles (3 for loss), 2 interceptions and 17 passes defended (led the conference). As a senior, he recorded 61 tackles, 3 interceptions (2 returned for touchdowns) and 12 passes defended.

During his college career, he accumulated 188 tackles (13 for loss), 39 pass break ups, 8 interceptions (2 returned for touchdown), 3 sacks and one forced fumble. He also returned 17 punts for 116 yards (6.8-yard average) and blocked an extra point. He was just the fifth player in school history to be named a first-team All-MWC selection for three years.

== Professional career ==
=== Cleveland Browns ===
McFadden was selected by the Cleveland Browns in the third round (68th overall pick) of the 2013 NFL draft. On August 30, 2014, McFadden was released by the Browns.

=== New York Jets ===
McFadden was claimed off waivers by the New York Jets on August 31, 2014. He was released by the Jets on September 11.

=== San Francisco 49ers ===
On November 1, 2014, McFadden was signed by the San Francisco 49ers to their practice squad. On November 1, he was promoted to the active roster. McFadden was released by the 49ers on September 5, 2015.

=== Arizona Cardinals ===
On September 7, 2015, the Arizona Cardinals signed McFadden to their practice squad.

=== New York Giants ===
On October 21, 2015, the New York Giants signed McFadden from the Arizona Cardinals practice squad. He was waived by the Giants on December 5. On December 8, McFadden was re-signed to the team's practice squad. On January 4, 2016, McFadden signed a reserve/future contract with the Giants. He was waived by the Giants on September 3.

=== Dallas Cowboys ===
On October 24, 2016, the Dallas Cowboys signed McFadden to their practice squad. On November 5, after injuries to Morris Claiborne and Barry Church, the Cowboys were forced to promote him to the active roster. Playing in his second game against the Pittsburgh Steelers, he allowed a pump-fake touchdown from Ben Roethlisberger to Antonio Brown, although he was one of the few Cowboys players that reacted to the play. He was mostly a core special teams player during the season.

On August 29, 2017, McFadden was placed on injured reserve with a hamstring injury. He was released by Dallas on September 2.

=== Atlanta Falcons ===
On December 4, 2017, McFadden was signed by the Atlanta Falcons, to provide depth while Brian Poole recovered from a back injury. He was declared inactive the rest of the season and the playoffs.

On March 13, 2018, he signed a one-year contract extension. He was released by the Falcons on August 31.

== Personal life ==
His father, Leon McFadden, was a shortstop and outfielder for the Houston Astros of Major League Baseball between 1968 and 1970.
