= Colton Simpson =

American criminal and writer

- Simpson in 2007
- Born: c. 1966; United States
- Occupation: Author
- Parent: Dick Simpson
- Status: Incarcerated (CEN)
- Convictions: Robbery; Attempted murder Burglary; Grand theft
- Penalty: 126 years imprisonment

Colton Simpson (born c. 1966) is an American criminal and former member of the Crips street gang who is serving a 126-year prison sentence under California's three-strikes law.

He is the author of Inside the Crips: Life Inside L.A.'s Most Notorious Gang, a book detailing his life in the gang. In 1998 he was charged with attempted murder, and sentenced to 40 years in prison.

He is the son of former baseball player Dick Simpson.

His prior convictions include a 1986 conviction for robbery and attempted murder.

Simpson was arrested in March 2003, two days after a jewel robbery in Temecula, California. Rental documents linked him to the getaway car used in the robbery, and he was identified as the driver by two police officers who had pursued the car. A trial scheduled for August 2005 was postponed after Simpson's attorney removed himself from the case. In 2007, Simpson was found guilty of robbery, burglary and grand theft, and sentenced under California's three-strikes law.

Inside the Crips was published in 2005.
