= Leon McFadden =

American baseball player (born 1944)

- Shortstop / Outfielder
- Born: April 26, 1944 (age 82); Little Rock, Arkansas, U.S.
- Batted: Right Threw: Right

Professional debut
- MLB: September 6, 1968, for the Houston Astros
- NPB: April 12, 1972, for the Hanshin Tigers

Last appearance
- MLB: April 28, 1970, for the Houston Astros
- NPB: October 7, 1972, for the Hanshin Tigers

MLB statistics
- Batting average: .215
- Home runs: 0
- Runs batted in: 4

NPB statistics
- Batting average: .283
- Home runs: 2
- Runs batted in: 6
- Stats at Baseball Reference

Teams
- Houston Astros (1968–1970); Hanshin Tigers (1972)

Leon McFadden (born April 26, 1944) is an American right-handed former Major League Baseball shortstop and outfielder who played from 1968 to 1970 for the Houston Astros. He also played one season in Japan for the Hanshin Tigers, in 1972.

== Career ==
Prior to playing professional baseball, McFadden attended Fremont High School in Los Angeles, California, with future professional players Brock Davis, Willie Crawford, Bobby Tolan, and Bob Watson.

Originally signed as an undrafted free agent by the Houston Colt .45s in 1963, the 6 ft 2 in (1.88 m), 195 pound McFadden made his Major League debut on September 6, 1968 against Pat Jarvis and the Atlanta Braves. In his only at-bat of the game, McFadden collected a base hit. Overall, McFadden appeared in 16 games for the Astros in 1968, collecting 13 hits in 47 at-bats for a .277 batting average. He scored twice and drove in one run.

McFadden was used as a bench player in 1969, playing in 44 games and getting only 74 at-bats. He collected only 13 hits for a .176 batting average. In 1970, he appeared in two games as a pinch runner. He appeared in his final big league game on April 28 of that year, when he ran for Watson. Two month later, he was traded with Jim Beauchamp to the St. Louis Cardinals for George Culver. However, he never played in a Cardinals uniform.

Overall, McFadden appeared in 62 big league games, collecting 26 hits in 121 at-bats for a .215 batting average. He hit three doubles, no triples and no home runs, scored five times and drove in four runs. He stole two bases, was caught twice, walked 10 times and struck out 19 times. His career fielding percentage was .962.

In 54 games with the Hanshin Tigers in 1972, McFadden batted .283, with two home runs and six RBI.

== Personal life ==
His son, Leon McFadden, is a current American football cornerback for the Dallas Cowboys of the NFL and played his college career at San Diego State University.
