= 1968 Houston Astros season =

Seventh season in Major League Baseball for the Houston Astros

1968 Houston Astros
- League: National League
- Ballpark: Astrodome
- City: Houston, Texas
- Record: 72–90 (.444)
- League place: 10th
- Owners: Roy Hofheinz
- General managers: Spec Richardson
- Managers: Grady Hatton, Harry Walker
- Television: KTRK-TV
- Radio: KPRC (AM) (Gene Elston, Loel Passe, Harry Kalas)

The 1968 Houston Astros season was the seventh season for the Major League Baseball (MLB) franchise located in Houston, Texas, their fourth as the Astros, seventh in the National League (NL), and fourth at The Astrodome. The Astros entered the season with a record of 68–93, in ninth place and 32 1/2 games behind the NL pennant and World Series-winning St. Louis Cardinals.

On April 10, pitcher Larry Dierker made his first career Opening Day start for the Astros, who hosted the Pittsburgh Pirates and won, 5–4. During the amateur draft, Houston's first round selection was catcher Martin Cott, at third overall, and in the 18th round, pitcher Ken Forsch.

For the first time, the Astros hosted the MLB All-Star Game at The Astrodome, with the NL defeating the American League (AL), 1–0. (Note: The next time the Astros hosted the All-Star Game was in 1986, also at The Astrodome.) First baseman Rusty Staub represented the Astros and played for the National League at the All-Star Game, his second career selection.

With an 18-strikeout performance on July 14, right-hander Don Wilson matched the then-major league record for a single game. (Note: Set by Bob Feller in 1938, matched by Sandy Koufax in 1959 and 1962, and surpassed by Steve Carlton in 1969.)

The Astros concluded their season with a record of 72–90, an improvement of three wins, in tenth place of 10 teams and 25 games behind the repeat NL-pennant winning Cardinals. It was the first time the Astros finished a season in last place. Shortstop Héctor Torres was selected to the Topps All-Star Rookie Team.

Along with MLB's expansion featuring the introduction of four new franchises (Note: The Kansas City Royals (AL), Montreal Expos (NL), San Diego Padres (NL), and Seattle Pilots (AL).) and an extra playoff round (Note: The League Championship Series (LCS).), this was also the final season prior to MLB's divisional era. Hence, all teams were realigned into four newly commissioned divisions beginning the following season, with the Astros to compete in the NL West.

== Offseason ==
- October 17, 1967: Bob Lillis was released by the Astros.
- October 25, 1967: César Cedeño was signed as an amateur free agent by the Astros.
- November 28, 1967: Doc Edwards was drafted from the Astros by the Philadelphia Phillies in the 1967 minor league draft.

== Regular season ==
=== Summary ===
==== April—June ====
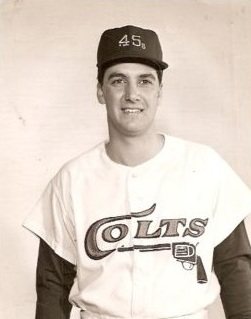
Bob Aspromonte, c. 1962, started on Opening Day for each of the Colt .45s/Astros' first seven campaigns.

Opening Day starting lineup
Uniform	Player	Position
22	Ron Davis	Center fielder
18	Joe Morgan	Second baseman
8	Hal King	Catcher
10	Rusty Staub	First baseman
24	Jimmy Wynn	Left fielder
21	Norm Miller	Right fielder
14	Bob Aspromonte	Third baseman
15	Héctor Torres	Shortstop
49	Larry Dierker	Pitcher
Venue: Astrodome • Final: Houston 5, Pittsburgh 4 Sources:

The start of the 1968 season, delayed due to the assassination of Martin Luther King Jr., commenced for Houston on April 10. On a walk-off hit, the Astros triumphed, 5–4, over the Pittsburgh Pirates. In the bottom of the second, Norm Miller took Jim Bunning deep for the Astros' first home run of the new campaign. Down 4–2 in the bottom of the ninth, Ivan Murrell plated Joe Morgan via a run batted in (RBI) single. Bob Aspromonte then tripled in Murrell and Julio Gotay to deliver the decisive run. Larry Dierker started for Houston and earned the complete game victory, with all four runs as earned, including Roberto Clemente's game-tying home run in the top of the third. Aspromonte's walk-off triple was the first in club history. The starting third baseman in 1968 and for each of the first seven of Colt .45s/Astros Opening Day starting lineups, Aspromonte was the only player to have remained a constituent of each.

On April 14, New York Mets handed the Astros their first defeat of the season, 4–0. It was in that contest that young Mets phenom—and future Astro—Nolan Ryan earned his first major league victory. For the first five innings, Ryan held the Astros hitless. The Astros mounted their greatest scoring threat during the bottom of the sixth, trailing the Mets, 2–0. With two outs and Lee Thomas on third base and Morgan on second, Ryan retired Rusty Staub looking to emerge from the inning unscathed. Ryan tossed 6 2/3 frames of shutout ball prior to departing due to a blister on his pitching hand.

The Astros and Mets took their April 15 contest to 24 innings at the Astrodome, with Houston prevailing 1–0. This was the longest shutout in major league history, lasting more than 6 hours before anyone scored. During the final inning, Bob Aspromonte's ground ball rolled through the legs of Al Weis, allowing Norm Miller to charge home and score for the walk-off win. Catchers Hal King and Jerry Grote played through the entire contest. Jim Ray, who took the mound in the 14th for Houston, surrendered just two hits over seven innings and established a club record for relievers by fanning 11. (Note: Surpassed record of 10 by Bob Bruce on May 4, 1962, against the Milwaukee Braves.) With the victory raising their record to 5–1 (.833), the Astros climbed to a season-high 4 games over .500.

Concurrent with a pitching duel on June 1 between the Chicago Cubs and the Astros at the Astrodome, Judge Hofheinz hosted the opening of Astroworld. Houston's newest amusement park, Astroworld was situated across the I-610 from the Astrodome.

Though games around Major League Baseball were postponed on June 10 in connection to the assassination of Robert F. Kennedy, two Houston Astros were fined for not playing in their game.

==== MLB All-Star Game at the Astrodome ====
On July 9, the Astrodome hosted the MLB All-Star Game for the first time, the 39th edition, with the NL playing the American League (AL). San Francisco Giants outfielder Willie Mays, who scored the game's only run as the National League prevailed, 1–0, was named the All-Star Game Most Valuable Player (MVP) Award winner. In a season hallmarked by some of the most dominant pitching of the modern era, the game depicted a microcosm of the times. In the bottom of the first inning, Mays scored the game's only run via a fielder's choice off a sharp Willie McCovey ground ball which the AL converted into a double play. The American League managed three hits while the NL collected five. This was the first-ever 1–0 score to result in the Midsummer Classic.

The loudest cheers from the hometown crowd erupted for first baseman Rusty Staub—representing the Astros as a reserve—and for Mickey Mantle. In the sixth inning, Staub popped out to third base as a pinch hitter for Denny McLain. In the eighth inning, Mantle pinch hit in what would be his final All-Star Game appearance and struck out against Tom Seaver.

==== Don Wilson's 18-strikeout game ====
Right-hander Don Wilson fanned 18 Cincinnati Reds on July 14 to establish the Houston Astros club record for one game, and, at the time, equaled the major league record. The historic outing transpired during the second game of a doubleheader at Crosley Field, in which Houston won, 6–1.

Cincinnati was loaded with offensive talent, pacing the league in batting average, on-base percentage, slugging percentage, on-base plus slugging percentage, hits, runs scored, doubles, and total bases. Meanwhile, the Astros ranked eighth in runs per game, last in defensive efficiency, and seventh in runs per game surrendered. However, they led the league in strikeouts.

Each member of Cincinnati's starting lineup struck out at least once except outfielder Alex Johnson, who also scored the Reds' only run. The final out of the contest—and Wilson's final strikeout victim—was rookie Johnny Bench, whom he punched out looking. In all, Wilson allowed five hits, two walks, and earned a complete game and a game score of 89. The 18 strikeouts represented Wilson's permanent career high.

Dick Simpson homered off Gerry Arrigo in the top of the third inning for the first run of the contest.

During the bottom of the fourth frame, with Tony Pérez batting, Johnson on third, and Lee May on first, the latter two executed a double steal. Johnson's steal was of home, which tied the score, 1–1. The run was unearned due to a throwing error on catcher John Bateman.

In the top of the fifth, the Astros resumed the lead with run-scoring singles by Jimmy Wynn and Bob Aspromonte, at 3–1.

Wilson's performance matched the modern major league record over a nine-inning game first established by Bob Feller of the Cleveland Indians on October 2, 1938, when he whiffed 18 Detroit Tigers. Sandy Koufax equaled the record twice, for the Los Angeles Dodgers on August 31, 1959, against the San Francisco Giants, and again on April 24, 1962, against the Chicago Cubs. The year after Wilson, Steve Carlton of the St. Louis Cardinals punched out 19 New York Mets on September 15, 1969, to surpass the single-game major league record. Having whiffed nine through the third inning against Cincinnati, Wilson tied the Major League record (Mickey Welch, 1884, and Herb Score, 1955).

==== Rest of July ====
Jimmy Wynn blasted his 100th career home run on July 26, deep to center field at the Astrodome, off Frank Linzy of San Francisco. Wynn became the first player to reach this milestone as a member of the Astros, who won, 4–1. Wynn connected during the bottom of the eighth inning for three runs batted in (RBI) to augment the Astros' lead to 4–0. Dick Simpson led Houston with three hits while furnishing the first RBI. Denny Lemaster, who came within one out of earning the complete game, surrendered his only run in the ninth inning, while scattering 7 hits.

==== August ====
During the lidlifter of a doubleheader at Forbes Field on August 10, Norm Miller cranked his first grand slam, Doug Rader swatted five hits with three doubles (10), and the Houston plastered the Pirates, 16–3. Rader established career highs in the two aforementioned categories, and another with 4 RBI. In the nightcap, Rader basted a two-run home run for his seventh consecutive hit and sixth RBI of the day. However, the Bucs rallied to plunder the second bout, 7–4, and split the twinbill.

==== September ====
Just two months after showcasing his career-high 18 punchouts, on September 10, Don Wilson reprised that feat with 16, striking again against Cincinnati during the first game of a doubleheader at Crosley Field. (Note: This contest had been rescheduled from July 15 due to rain, the day after Wilson's 18-strikeout performance.) Catcher John Bateman started the scoring in the top of the second with a sacrifice fly for Houston. In the bottom of the inning, Cincinnati's catcher Johnny Bench took Wilson deep. At the plate, Wilson went 1-for-3 and scored a run. Cincinnati pitching issued three intentional bases on balls with two going to Leon McFadden. Right fielder José Herrera stroked a bases-loaded double in the top of the fifth to score McFadden and Wilson, which proved the game's pivotal play. A wild pitch from Wilson in the bottom of the fifth plated Tony Pérez, but that was the limit of the scoring as Houston prevailed, 3–2, Bench and Pete Rose with 3 strikeouts each, were Wilson's frequent strikeout victims. Wilson, who went the distance with a game score of 81, upped his record to 13–14. The 16 strikeouts represented the second-highest of Wilson's career.

==== Performance overview ====
The Astros concluded their season with a record of 72–90, in tenth place of 10 teams and 25 games behind the repeat NL-pennant winning St. Louis Cardinals. In spite of an improvement of three wins, it was the first time the Astros finished a season in last place. At the time, the 72 wins represented the most in a season in franchise history, tying the 1966 squad. The following year, Houston improved by 9 wins to attain their first-ever .500 season at 81–81. This would break a streak of each of the first 7 consecutive seasons in franchise history ending with 90 losses or more. The 1969 campaign also represented the first year of divisional play, situating the Astros into the newly commissioned National League West division. The Astros would not lose 90 or more games over successive campaigns for more than four decades until 2010 to 2014.

Houston's starting rotation featured four hurlers who each tallied double-figures in wins that year: Wilson (13), Larry Dierker (12) Dave Giusti (11) and Denny Lemaster (10).

At the time, Mike Cuellar (2.74) and Lemaster (2.81) posted the second- and third-lowest ERA in club history among left-handers, behind only Cuellar himself in 1966 (2.22). The 1968 figures were later surpassed by Bob Knepper (2.18 in 1981), Andy Pettitte (2.39 in 2005) and Dallas Keuchel (2.48 in 2015). (Note: For single seasons, throws LH, qualified for league ERA title, playing for HOU, in the regular season, sorted by ascending earned run average.)

The 1968 campaign was the final in Houston for Bob Aspromonte, the lone remaining member of the inaugural 1962 Colt .45s. The club dealt him following the season to the Atlanta Braves for utility player Marty Martínez. (Note: Another "last" distinction that Aspromonte held was the last active player to the wear the uniform of the Brooklyn Dodgers as of his retirement in 1971.) Though not a power hitter, Aspromonte departed Houston as the career leader in grand slams (six) (Note: Surpassed by Carlos Lee.) and walk-off home runs (four). (Note: Surpassed by José Cruz and Carlos Lee. HOU: 110 home runs in 1912–2025 – walk-off)

With the advent of divisional play for 1969, Major League Baseball held an expansion round to introduce four expansion teams: the Montreal Expos in the National League East division, the San Diego Padres in the NL West, and both the Kansas City Royals and Seattle Pilots in the American League West.

=== League standings ===
National League
Team	W	L	Pct.	GB	Home	Road
St. Louis Cardinals	97	65	.599	—	47‍–‍34	50‍–‍31
San Francisco Giants	88	74	.543	9	42‍–‍39	46‍–‍35
Chicago Cubs	84	78	.519	13	47‍–‍34	37‍–‍44
Cincinnati Reds	83	79	.512	14	40‍–‍41	43‍–‍38
Atlanta Braves	81	81	.500	16	41‍–‍40	40‍–‍41
Pittsburgh Pirates	80	82	.494	17	40‍–‍41	40‍–‍41
Los Angeles Dodgers	76	86	.469	21	41‍–‍40	35‍–‍46
Philadelphia Phillies	76	86	.469	21	38‍–‍43	38‍–‍43
New York Mets	73	89	.451	24	32‍–‍49	41‍–‍40
Houston Astros	72	90	.444	25	42‍–‍39	30‍–‍51

==== Record versus opponents ====
National League

1968 National League record Sources:
Team	ATL	CHC	CIN	HOU	LAD	NYM	PHI	PIT	SF	STL
Atlanta	—	8–10	10–8	11–7	9–9	12–6–1	11–7	6–12	9–9	5–13
Chicago	10–8	—	7–11	10–8	12–6	8–10	9–9	10–8	9–9–1	9–9
Cincinnati	8–10	11–7	—	9–9	9–9	10–8	11–7	10–8–1	8–10	7–11
Houston	7–11	8–10	9–9	—	11–7	10–8	9–9	5–13	8–10	5–13
Los Angeles	9–9	6–12	9–9	7–11	—	7–11	10–8	10–8	9–9	9–9
New York	6–12–1	10–8	8–10	8–10	11–7	—	8–10	9–9	7–11	6–12
Philadelphia	7–11	9–9	7–11	9–9	8–10	10–8	—	9–9	9–9	8–10
Pittsburgh	12–6	8–10	8–10–1	13–5	8–10	9–9	9–9	—	7–11	6–12
San Francisco	9–9	9–9–1	10–8	10–8	9–9	11–7	9–9	11–7	—	10–8
St. Louis	13–5	9–9	11–7	13–5	9–9	12–6	10–8	12–6	8–10	—

=== Notable transactions ===
- May 4, 1968: Aaron Pointer was traded by the Astros to the Chicago Cubs for Byron Browne.
- June 8, 1968: Larry Yount was drafted by the Astros in the 5th round of the 1968 Major League Baseball draft.

=== Roster ===
1968 Houston Astros
Roster
Pitchers: 36 Wade Blasingame; 30 John Buzhardt; 31 Danny Coombs; 35 Mike Cuellar; 49 Larry Dierker; 44 Tom Dukes; 33 Hal Gilson; 39 Dave Giusti; 48 Fred Gladding; 43 Pat House; 23 Denny Lemaster; 45 Jim Ray; 40 Steve Shea; 40 Don Wilson	Catchers: 6 Dave Adlesh; 7 John Bateman; 9 Ron Brand; 8 Hal King; Infielders: 14 Bob Aspromonte; 17 Julio Gotay; 00 John Mayberry; 20 Leon McFadden; 11 Denis Menke; 18 Joe Morgan; 12 Doug Rader; 10 Rusty Staub; 15 Héctor Torres	Outfielders: 37 Byron Browne; 27 Nate Colbert; 22 Ron Davis; 22 José Herrera; 21 Norm Miller; 20 Ivan Murrell; 37 Dick Simpson; 28 Lee Thomas; 27 Bob Watson; 24 Jimmy Wynn; Other batters: 50 Danny Walton	Manager: 1 Grady Hatton; 25 Harry Walker; Coaches: 4 Buddy Hancken; 3 Mel McGaha; 5 Jim Owens; 2 Salty Parker

== Game log ==
=== Regular season ===
Legend
	Astros win
	Astros loss
	Postponement
	Eliminated from playoff race
**Bold**	Astros team member

1968 regular season game log: 72–90 (Home: 42–39; Away: 30–51)
April: 7–10 (Home: 6–2; Away: 1–8)

#	Date	Time (CT)	Opponent	Score	Win	Loss	Save	Time of Game	Attendance	Record	Box/ Streak
—	April 9		Pirates	**Postponed (Funeral of Martin Luther King Jr.)** (Makeup date: April 10)							
1	April 10		Pirates								
7	April 17		@ Pirates								

May: 14–14 (Home: 8–6; Away: 6–8)

#	Date	Time (CT)	Opponent	Score	Win	Loss	Save	Time of Game	Attendance	Record	Box/ Streak

June: 11–19 (Home: 8–11; Away: 3–8)

#	Date	Time (CT)	Opponent	Score	Win	Loss	Save	Time of Game	Attendance	Record	Box/ Streak
52	June 7		Pirates								
53	June 8		Pirates								
54	June 9		Pirates								
57	June 14		@ Pirates								
58	June 15		@ Pirates								
59 (1)	June 16		@ Pirates								
60 (2)	June 16		@ Pirates								
61	June 17		@ Pirates								

July: 13–17 (Home: 4–8; Away: 9–9)

#	Date	Time (CT)	Opponent	Score	Win	Loss	Save	Time of Game	Attendance	Record	Box/ Streak
—	July 9	7:15 p.m. CDT	**39th All-Star Game in Houston, TX**								

August: 19–13 (Home: 11–6; Away: 8–7)

#	Date	Time (CT)	Opponent	Score	Win	Loss	Save	Time of Game	Attendance	Record	Box/ Streak
113	August 8		Pirates								
114	August 9		Pirates								
115 (1)	August 10		Pirates								
116 (2)	August 10		Pirates								
117	August 11		Pirates								

September: 8–17 (Home: 5–6; Away: 3–11)

#	Date	Time (CT)	Opponent	Score	Win	Loss	Save	Time of Game	Attendance	Record	Box/ Streak
139 (1)	September 2		@ Pirates								
140 (2)	September 2		@ Pirates								
141	September 3		@ Pirates								

=== Detailed records ===
National League
Opponent	W	L	WP	RS	RA
**Houston Astros**					
Pittsburgh Pirates	5	13	0.278	57	90
Season Total	5	13	0.278	57	90

Month	Games	Won	Lost	Win %	RS	RA
April
May
June
July
August
September
Total

	Games	Won	Lost	Win %	RS	RA
Home
Away
Total

== Player stats ==
=== Batting ===
==== Starters by position ====
Note: Pos = Position; G = Games played; AB = At bats; H = Hits; Avg. = Batting average; HR = Home runs; RBI = Runs batted in

Pos	Player	G	AB	H	Avg.	HR	RBI
C	John Bateman	111	350	87	.249	4	33
1B	Rusty Staub	161	591	172	.291	6	72
2B	Denis Menke	150	542	135	.249	6	56
SS	Héctor Torres	128	466	104	.223	1	24
3B	Doug Rader	98	333	89	.267	6	43
LF	Bob Watson	45	140	32	.229	2	8
CF	Jimmy Wynn	156	542	146	.269	26	67
RF	Norm Miller	79	257	61	.237	6	28

==== Other batters ====
Note: G = Games played; AB = At bats; H = Hits; Avg. = Batting average; HR = Home runs; RBI = Runs batted in

Player	G	AB	H	Avg.	HR	RBI
Bob Aspromonte	124	409	92	.225	1	46
Ron Davis	52	217	46	.212	1	12
Lee Thomas	90	201	39	.194	1	11
Dick Simpson	59	177	33	.186	3	11
Julio Gotay	75	165	41	.248	1	11
Dave Adlesh	40	104	19	.183	0	4
José Herrera	27	100	24	.240	0	7
Ron Brand	43	81	13	.160	0	4
Ivan Murrell	32	59	6	.102	0	3
Hal King	27	55	8	.145	0	2
Nate Colbert	20	53	8	.151	0	4
Leon McFadden	16	47	13	.277	0	1
Joe Morgan	10	20	5	.250	0	0
Byron Browne	10	13	3	.231	0	1
John Mayberry	4	9	0	.000	0	0
Danny Walton	2	2	0	.000	0	0

=== Pitching ===
==== Starting pitchers ====
Note: G = Games pitched; IP = Innings pitched; W = Wins; L = Losses; ERA = Earned run average; SO = Strikeouts

Player	G	IP	W	L	ERA	SO
Dave Giusti	37	251.0	11	14	3.19	186
Larry Dierker	32	233.2	12	15	3.31	161
Denny Lemaster	33	224.0	10	15	2.81	146
Don Wilson	33	208.2	13	16	3.28	175
Mike Cuellar	28	170.2	8	11	2.74	133

==== Relief pitchers ====
Note: G = Games pitched; W = Wins; L = Losses; SV = Saves; ERA = Earned run average; SO = Strikeouts

Player	G	W	L	SV	ERA	SO
Steve Shea	30	4	4	6	3.38	15
Tom Dukes	43	2	2	4	4.27	37
Jim Ray	41	2	3	1	2.67	71
Danny Coombs	40	4	3	2	3.28	29
John Buzhardt	39	4	4	5	3.12	37
Wade Blasingame	22	1	2	1	4.75	22
Pat House	18	1	1	0	7.71	6
Fred Gladding	7	0	0	2	14.54	2
Hal Gilson	2	0	0	0	7.36	1

== Major League Baseball draft ==
Houston Astros 1968 MLB draft selections
Rd.	Slot	Draftee	Position	School	Origin	Signed	Notes	Bio
1	3	Martin Cott	Catcher	Hutchinson Central Technical	(New York (state))	Y		
2	23	Rich Chiles	Outfielder	Winters High	(California)	Y	(Note: MLB debut on April 20, 1971, for Houston)	
3	43	Bill Greif	Right-handed pitcher	John H. Reagan High	(Texas)	Y	(Note: MLB debut on July 19, 1971, for Houston)	
4	63	Larry Mansfield	First baseman	Tennessee	(Tennessee)	Y		
5	87	Larry Yount	Right-handed pitcher	William Howard Taft Charter (CA)	(Texas)	Y	(Note: MLB debut on September 15, 1971, for Houston)	
6	111	John Grant	Left-handed pitcher	Westchester High	(California)	Y		
7	135	Greg Pavlick	Right-handed pitcher	Thomas A. Edison High	(Washington, D.C.)	N	(Note: Signed with the New York Mets from the 1971 MLB June Draft-Secondary Phase (Delayed).)	
18	399	Ken Forsch	Right-handed pitcher	Oregon State	(California)	Y	(Note: MLB debut on September 7, 1970, for Houston)	

== Awards and achievements ==
=== Grand slams ===
No.	Date	Astros batter	Venue	Inning	Pitcher	Opposing team	Box
1	August 10 (Note: Game 1 of doubleheader)	Norm Miller (Note: 1st MLB grand slam)	Forbes Field	8	Roy Face	Pittsburgh Pirates	

=== Awards ===
1968 Houston Astros award winners
Name of award		Recipient	Ref.
Houston Astros Most Valuable Player (MVP)		Denis Menke	
MLB All-Star Game	Reserve infielder	Rusty Staub	
Topps All-Star Rookie Team	Shortstop	Héctor Torres	

== Minor league system ==
Level	Team	League	Manager
AAA	Oklahoma City 89ers	Pacific Coast League	Cot Deal
AA	Dallas-Fort Worth Spurs	Texas League	Hub Kittle
A	Greensboro Patriots	Carolina League	Brandy Davis
A	Cocoa Astros	Florida State League	Tony Pacheco and Leo Posada
Rookie	Covington Astros	Appalachian League	Tony Pacheco

== See also ==
- List of Major League Baseball All-Star Game venues
- List of pitchers who have struck out 18 or more batters in a nine-inning baseball game
