= Dick Simpson =

American baseball player (born 1943)

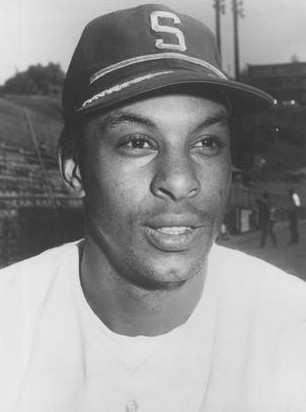
- Simpson in 1969
- Right fielder
- Born: July 28, 1943 (age 83); Washington, D.C., U.S.
- Batted: Right Threw: Right

MLB debut
- September 21, 1962, for the Los Angeles Angels

Last MLB appearance
- August 27, 1969, for the Seattle Pilots

MLB statistics
- Batting average: .207
- Home runs: 15
- Runs batted in: 56
- Stats at Baseball Reference

Teams
- Los Angeles / California Angels (1962, 1964–1965); Cincinnati Reds (1966–1967); St. Louis Cardinals (1968); Houston Astros (1968); New York Yankees (1969); Seattle Pilots (1969)

Richard Charles Simpson (born July 28, 1943) is an American former Major League Baseball right fielder and center fielder. He played from 1962 to 1969 for the Los Angeles / California Angels, Cincinnati Reds, St. Louis Cardinals, Houston Astros, New York Yankees and Seattle Pilots. During an eight-year baseball career, Simpson hit .207 with 15 home runs and 56 runs batted in (RBI). He was listed at 6'4" and 176 lbs.

Originally signed by the Angels as a free agent in 1961, he made his debut with them on September 21, 1962 at age 19 against the Cleveland Indians. He pinch hit for pitcher Fred Newman and singled off Mudcat Grant, driving in Leo Burke in his only at bat. Simpson appeared in five more games for the Angels that season, then returned to the team in 1964. Before the 1964 season began, Angels general manager Fred Haney touted Simpson as a possible Rookie of the Year candidate. He batted .301 with 22 doubles, 12 triples, 24 home runs, 29 stolen bases and 79 RBI with the Angels' Triple-A affiliate in Seattle in 1965. He was dealt from the Angels to the Baltimore Orioles for Norm Siebern on December 2, 1965. Simpson replaced Curt Blefary as the young outfielder traded along with Milt Pappas and Jack Baldschun from the Orioles to the Reds for Frank Robinson one week later on December 9.

== Other major transactions ==
- On January 11, 1968, the Reds traded him to the Cardinals for Alex Johnson.
- The Cardinals traded him along with Hal Gilson to the Astros for Ron Davis before the trade deadline on June 15, 1968.
- On December 4, 1968, he was traded by the Astros to the Yankees for Dooley Womack.
- Was traded for José Vidal of the Seattle Pilots by the Yankees on May 19, 1969.
- Was traded by the Pilots, along with Steve Whitaker, to the San Francisco Giants for Bobby Bolin on December 12, 1969.

== Other information ==
- Was the second-youngest player in 1962, trailing only Ed Kirkpatrick.
- Was considered one of the fastest players of his day, but still only stole 10 career bases.
- Did not play in the major leagues in 1963.
- Hit a leadoff home run on the first pitch from Mickey Lolich in a June 9, 1969 game. This would end up being the only run Lolich gave up in the game, a game in which he struck out 16 batters. That was the final home run of Simpson's career.
- His uniform numbers: 10 (1962, 1964–1965), 20 (1966–1967), 12 (1968), 37 (1968), 9 (1969), 16 (1969).
- He earned $7,000 in 1965 and $16,000 in 1969.
- Collected his final career hit off Fred Talbot on August 12, 1969.
- He is the father of Colton Simpson, author of the book Inside the Crips, and serving a 126-year sentence under California's 3-strikes law.
