= Julius Osley =

American baseball player

- Pitcher
- Born: May 15, 1915; Acmar, Alabama, U.S.
- Died: January 1968
- Threw: Right

Negro league baseball debut
- 1937, for the Birmingham Black Barons

Last appearance
- 1938, for the Birmingham Black Barons

Teams
- Birmingham Black Barons (1937–1938)

Julius Ceaser Osley (May 15, 1915 – January 1968) was an American Negro league pitcher in the 1930s.

A native of Acmar, Alabama, Osley played for the Birmingham Black Barons in 1937 and 1938. In his nine recorded appearances, he yielded eight earned runs in 22.1 innings on the mound. Osley died in 1968 at age 52.
