= Ron Davis (outfielder) =

American baseball player (1941–1992)

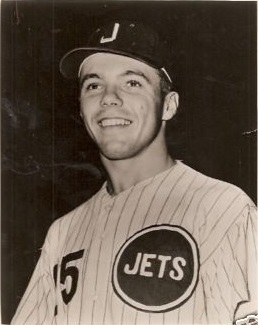
- With the Columbus Jets (1970)
- Outfielder
- Born: October 12, 1941; Roanoke Rapids, North Carolina, U.S.
- Died: September 5, 1992 (aged 50); Houston, Texas, U.S.
- Batted: Right Threw: Right

MLB debut
- August 1, 1962, for the Houston Colt .45s

Last MLB appearance
- September 25, 1969, for the Pittsburgh Pirates

MLB statistics
- Batting average: .233
- Home runs: 10
- Runs batted in: 79
- Stats at Baseball Reference

Teams
- Houston Colt .45s (1962); Houston Astros (1966–1968); St. Louis Cardinals (1968); Pittsburgh Pirates (1969)

Ronald Everette Davis (October 21, 1941 – September 5, 1992) was an American professional baseball outfielder. He played in Major League Baseball (MLB) during 1962, and from 1966 to 1969, for the Houston Colt .45s / Astros, St. Louis Cardinals and Pittsburgh Pirates.

He was 6 ft 0 in (1.83 m) tall and he weighed 180 pounds and before playing professional baseball he attended Duke University.

Originally signed as an amateur free-agent by the Colt .45s in 1961, Davis made his big league debut on August 1, 1962 at the age of 20 against Eddie Mathews, Hank Aaron and the rest of the Milwaukee Braves. In his first big league game, he went 1-for-4. He played in a total of six games in his first big league season, collecting three hits in 14 at-bats for a .214 batting average.

He wouldn't play in the big leagues again until 1966, and he came back in fine fashion. In his first game back – on August 6, 1966, he went 3-for-5 against the Los Angeles Dodgers. His early success eventually tapered off, as he finished the season with a .247 batting average.

1967 was the best year of Davis' career. He appeared in 94 games, collecting 73 hits in 285 at-bats for a .256 batting average. He also hit seven home runs and drove in 38 RBI.

He started the 1968 season with the Astros, playing in 52 games for them, hitting .212. He was traded from the Astros to the Cardinals for Dick Simpson and Hal Gilson before the trade deadline on June 15. In 33 games with St. Louis, he hit .177. Overall, he hit .203 in 1968. He appeared in the World Series with the Cardinals in 1968 – in two games, he collected no hits in seven at-bats.

Following the 1968 season, Davis was traded with minor leaguer Phil Knuckles, Danny Breeden and Ed Spiezio for Dave Giusti of the San Diego Padres. Then, just before the start of the 1969 season, he was traded with Bobby Klaus to the Pirates for Tommie Sisk and Chris Cannizzaro.

He played his final season in the Majors in 1969. In 62 games for the Pirates, he collected 15 hits in 64 at-bats for a .234 batting average.

In 1970 and 1971 Davis played in the minors for the Pirates International League AAA farm team the Columbus Jets. The team moved to Charleston, West Virginia in 1971 becoming the Charleston Charlies.

Overall, Davis played in 295 games in his five-year career, collecting 199 hits in 853 at-bats for a .233 batting average. He scored 96 runs and drove 79 in. He hit 44 doubles, six triples and 10 home runs, and he stole nine bases in 18 attempts. He walked 56 times and struck out 160 times. He died in Houston in 1992 at the age of 50.
