= Scott Lydy =

American baseball player (born 1968)

- Outfielder
- Born: October 26, 1968 (age 57); Mesa, Arizona, U.S.
- Batted: Right Threw: Right

Professional debut
- MLB: May 18, 1993, for the Oakland Athletics
- NPB: March 30, 1996, for the Fukuoka Daiei Hawks

Last appearance
- MLB: October 3, 1993, for the Oakland Athletics
- NPB: August 15, 1996, for the Fukuoka Daiei Hawks

MLB statistics
- Batting average: .225
- Home runs: 2
- Runs batted in: 7

NPB statistics
- Batting average: .281
- Home runs: 7
- Runs batted in: 29
- Stats at Baseball Reference

Teams
- Oakland Athletics (1993); Fukuoka Daiei Hawks (1996)

Donald Scott Lydy (born October 26, 1968) is an American former professional baseball outfielder. He played for the Oakland Athletics of the Major League Baseball (MLB) during the 1993 season.
