= Melvin Coleman =

American baseball player

- Shortstop
- Born: January 1, 1911; Charlotte, North Carolina, U.S.
- Died: April 22, 1968 (aged 57); Charlotte, North Carolina, U.S.

Negro league baseball debut
- 1937, for the Birmingham Black Barons

Last appearance
- 1944, for the Atlanta Black Crackers

Teams
- Birmingham Black Barons (1937); Atlanta Black Crackers (1944)

Melvin Coleman (January 1, 1911 – April 22, 1968) was an American Negro league shortstop in the 1930s.

A native of Charlotte, North Carolina, Coleman played for the Birmingham Black Barons in 1937. In 19 recorded games for Birmingham, he posted 18 hits in 65 plate appearances. Coleman later had a brief stint with the Atlanta Black Crackers in 1944. He died in Charlotte, North Carolina in 1968 at age 57.
