= Clarence Orme =

American baseball player

- Second baseman
- Born: April 3, 1899; Chamois, Missouri, U.S.
- Died: June 12, 1968 (aged 69); Kansas City, Missouri, U.S.
- Threw: Right

Negro league baseball debut
- 1920, for the Kansas City Monarchs

Last appearance
- 1920, for the Kansas City Monarchs

Teams
- Kansas City Monarchs (1920)

Clarence Bernard Orme (April 3, 1899 – June 12, 1968) was an American Negro league second baseman in the 1920s.

A native of Chamois, Missouri, Orme played for the Kansas City Monarchs in 1920. In his nine recorded plate appearances, he posted no hits, but walked three times, stole a base, and scored a run. Orme died in Kansas City, Missouri in 1968 at age 69.
