= 1969 San Diego Padres season =

1969 San Diego Padres
- League: National League
- Division: West
- Ballpark: San Diego Stadium
- City: San Diego, California
- Record: 52–110 (.321)
- Divisional place: 6th
- Owners: C. Arnholdt Smith
- General managers: Buzzie Bavasi
- Managers: Preston Gómez
- Television: KOGO
- Radio: KOGO (Duke Snider, Frank Sims, Jerry Gross)

The 1969 San Diego Padres season was the inaugural season in franchise history. They joined the National League along with the Montreal Expos via the 1969 Major League Baseball expansion. In their inaugural season, the Padres went 52–110 (the same record as their expansion counterpart), finishing last in the newly created National League West, 41 games behind the division champion Atlanta Braves. The Padres finished last in the majors as a team in runs scored (468), hits (1,203) and batting average (225).

== Offseason ==
=== Expansion draft ===
The 1968 MLB expansion draft was held on October 14, 1968. Below is a list of players drafted by the Padres. "Pick" refers to the overall draft position of a pick.

Player	Former Team	Pick
Ollie Brown	San Francisco Giants	1st
Dave Giusti	St. Louis Cardinals	3rd
Dick Selma	New York Mets	5th
Al Santorini	Atlanta Braves	7th
José Arcia	Chicago Cubs	9th
Clay Kirby	St. Louis Cardinals	12th
Fred Kendall	Cincinnati Reds	14th
Jerry Morales	New York Mets	16th
Nate Colbert	Houston Astros	18th
Zoilo Versalles	Los Angeles Dodgers	20th
Frank Reberger	Chicago Cubs	22nd
Jerry DaVanon	St. Louis Cardinals	24th
Larry Stahl	New York Mets	26th
Dick Kelley	Atlanta Braves	28th
Al Ferrara	Los Angeles Dodgers	30th
Mike Corkins	San Francisco Giants	31st
Tom Dukes	Houston Astros	33rd
Rick James	Chicago Cubs	35th
Tony González	Philadelphia Phillies	37th
Dave Roberts	Pittsburgh Pirates	39th
Don Shaw	New York Mets	40th
Ivan Murrell	Houston Astros	42nd
Jim Williams	Los Angeles Dodgers	44th
Billy McCool	Cincinnati Reds	46th
Roberto Peña	Philadelphia Phillies	48th
Al McBean	Pittsburgh Pirates	50th
Rafael Robles	San Francisco Giants	51st
Fred Katawczik	Cincinnati Reds	53rd
Ron Slocum	Pittsburgh Pirates	55th
Steve Arlin	Philadelphia Philles	57th
Cito Gaston	Atlanta Braves	59th

=== Other transactions ===
- December 3, 1968: Dave Giusti was traded by the Padres to the St. Louis Cardinals for Ed Spiezio, Danny Breeden, Ron Davis and Phil Knuckles (minors).
- March 28, 1969: Ron Davis and Bobby Klaus were traded by the Padres to the Pittsburgh Pirates for Chris Cannizzaro and Tommie Sisk.

=== 1968 MLB June amateur draft ===
The Padres and Montreal Expos, along with the two American League expansion teams set to debut in 1969, the Kansas City Royals and Seattle Pilots, were allowed to participate in the June 1968 MLB first-year player draft, although the new teams were barred from the lottery's first three rounds. The Padres drafted only 16 players in the 1968 June draft, and of the players the Padres were able to sign, one (outfielder Dave Robinson) reached the major leagues.

== Regular season ==
=== The first game ===
==== Scorecard ====
April 8, 1969 at San Diego Stadium, San Diego, California
Team	1	2	3	4	5	6	7	8	9	R	H	E
Houston	1	0	0	0	0	0	0	0	0	1	5	1
San Diego	0	0	0	0	1	1	0	0	X	2	4	0
WP: Dick Selma (1–0) LP: Don Wilson (0–1); Home runs: HOU: None; SD: Ed Spiezio (1)

==== Batting ====
Houston Astros	AB	R	H	RBI	San Diego Padres	AB	R	H	RBI
Alou (RF)	4	1	3	0	Robles (SS)	4	0	0	0
Morgan (2B)	3	0	0	0	Peña (2B)	3	1	0	0
Miller (CF)	4	0	0	0	González (CF)	4	0	0	0
Rader (3B)	4	0	1	1	Brown (RF)	4	0	1	1
Blefary (1B)	4	0	1	0	Davis (1B)	3	0	0	0
Watson (LF)	4	0	0	0	Colbert (1B)	0	0	0	0
Menke (SS)	3	0	0	0	Stahl (LF)	3	0	0	0
Edwards (C)	3	0	0	0	Spiezio (3B)	3	1	1	0
Wilson (P)	2	0	0	0	Cannizzaro (C)	2	0	0	0
Geiger (PH)	1	0	0	0	Selma (P)	2	0	2	0
Billingham (P)	0	0	0	0	-	-	-	-	-
Totals	32	1	5	1	Totals	28	2	4	2

==== Pitching ====
Houston Astros	IP	H	R	ER	BB	SO
Wilson, L (0–1)	6.0	3	2	2	1	4
Billingham	2.0	1	0	0	0	3
Totals	8.0	4	2	2	1	7

San Diego Padres	IP	H	R	ER	BB	SO
Selma, W (1–0)	9.0	5	1	1	2	12
Totals	9.0	5	1	1	2	12

=== Season standings ===
NL West
Team	W	L	Pct.	GB	Home	Road
Atlanta Braves	93	69	.574	—	50‍–‍31	43‍–‍38
San Francisco Giants	90	72	.556	3	52‍–‍29	38‍–‍43
Cincinnati Reds	89	73	.549	4	50‍–‍31	39‍–‍42
Los Angeles Dodgers	85	77	.525	8	50‍–‍31	35‍–‍46
Houston Astros	81	81	.500	12	52‍–‍29	29‍–‍52
San Diego Padres	52	110	.321	41	28‍–‍53	24‍–‍57

=== Record vs. opponents ===
1969 National League record Sources:
Team	ATL	CHC	CIN	HOU	LAD	MON	NYM	PHI	PIT	SD	SF	STL
Atlanta	—	3–9	12–6	15–3	9–9	8–4	4–8	6–6	8–4	13–5	9–9	6–6
Chicago	9–3	—	6–6–1	8–4	6–6	10–8	8–10	12–6	7–11	11–1	6–6	9–9
Cincinnati	6–12	6–6–1	—	9–9	10–8	8–4	6–6	10–2	5–7	11–7	10–8	8–4
Houston	3–15	4–8	9–9	—	6–12	11–1	10–2	8–4	3–9	10–8	10–8	7–5
Los Angeles	9–9	6–6	8–10	12–6	—	10–2	4–8	8–4	8–4	12–6	5–13	3–9
Montreal	4–8	8–10	4–8	1–11	2–10	—	5–13	11–7	5–13	4–8	1–11	7–11
New York	8–4	10–8	6–6	2–10	8–4	13–5	—	12–6	10–8	11–1	8–4	12–6
Philadelphia	6-6	6–12	2–10	4–8	4–8	7–11	6–12	—	10–8	8–4	3–9	7–11
Pittsburgh	4–8	11–7	7–5	9–3	4–8	13–5	8–10	8–10	—	10–2	5–7	9–9
San Diego	5–13	1–11	7–11	8–10	6–12	8–4	1–11	4–8	2–10	—	6–12	4–8
San Francisco	9–9	6–6	8–10	8–10	13–5	11–1	4–8	9–3	7–5	12–6	—	3–9
St. Louis	6–6	9–9	4–8	5–7	9–3	11–7	6–12	11–7	9–9	8–4	9–3	—

=== Notable transactions ===
- April 14, 1969: Chris Krug was signed as a free agent by the Padres.
- April 17, 1969: Al McBean was traded by the Padres to the Los Angeles Dodgers for Tommy Dean and Leon Everitt.
- April 25, 1969: Dick Selma was traded by the Padres to the Chicago Cubs for Joe Niekro, Frankie Libran and Gary Ross.
- May 22, 1969: Bill Davis and Jerry DaVanon were traded by the Padres to the St. Louis Cardinals for John Sipin and Sonny Ruberto.
- May 23, 1969: Chris Krug was released by the Padres.
- June 13, 1969: Tony González was traded by the Padres to the Atlanta Braves for Van Kelly, Walt Hriniak and Andy Finlay (minors).

==== Draft picks ====
- June 5, 1969: 1969 Major League Baseball draft
  - Randy Elliott was drafted by the Padres in the 1st round (24th pick).
  - Doug DeCinces was drafted by the Padres in the 18th round, but did not sign.

=== Roster ===
1969 San Diego Padres
Roster
Pitchers: 44 Steve Arlin; 27 Jack Baldschun; 30 Mike Corkins; 44 Tom Dukes; 31 Leon Everitt; 22 Dick Kelley; 43 Clay Kirby; 34 Al McBean; 42 Billy McCool; 37 Joe Niekro; 45 Johnny Podres; 46 Frank Reberger; 15 Dave Roberts; 33 Gary Ross; 23 Al Santorini; 39 Dick Selma; 16,25 Tommie Sisk	Catchers: 3,8 Chris Cannizzaro; 25 Walt Hriniak; 36 Fred Kendall; 24 Chris Krug; 10 Sonny Ruberto; Infielders: 5 José Arcia; 17 Nate Colbert; 36 Jerry DaVanon; 12 Bill Davis; 3 Tommy Dean; 14,36 Van Kelly; 35 Frankie Libran; 11 Roberto Peña; 35 Rafael Robles; 2 John Sipin; 12 Ron Slocum; 7 Ed Spiezio	Outfielders: 26 Ollie Brown; 9 Al Ferrara; 21 Cito Gaston; 25 Tony González; 32 Jerry Morales; 20 Ivan Murrell; 14 Larry Stahl; 39 Jim Williams	Manager: 18 Preston Gómez; Coaches: 1 Sparky Anderson (Third Base); 38 Roger Craig (Pitching); 6 Wally Moon (First Base); 19 Whitey Wietelmann (Bullpen)

== Player stats ==
= Indicates team leader

=== Batting ===
==== Starters by position ====
Note: Pos = Position; G = Games played; AB = At bats; R = Runs scored; H = Hits; Avg. = Batting average; HR = Home runs; RBI = Runs batted in; SB = Stolen bases

Pos	Player	G	AB	R	H	Avg.	HR	RBI	SB
C	Chris Cannizzaro	134	418	23	92	.220	4	33	0
1B	Nate Colbert	139	483	64	123	.255	24	66	6
2B	José Arcia	120	302	35	65	.215	0	10	14
3B	Ed Spiezio	121	355	29	83	.234	13	43	1
SS	Tommy Dean	101	273	14	48	.176	2	9	0
LF	Al Ferrara	138	366	39	95	.260	14	56	0
CF	Cito Gaston	129	391	20	90	.230	2	28	4
RF	Ollie Brown	151	568	76	150	.264	20	61	10

==== Other batters ====
Note: G = Games played; AB = At bats; R = Runs scored; H = Hits; Avg. = Batting average; HR = Home runs; RBI = Runs batted in; SB = Stolen bases

Player	G	AB	R	H	Avg.	HR	RBI	SB
Roberto Peña	139	472	44	118	.250	4	30	0
Ivan Murrell	111	247	19	63	.255	3	25	3
John Sipin	68	229	22	51	.223	2	9	2
Van Kelly	73	209	16	51	.244	3	15	0
Tony González	53	182	17	41	.225	2	8	1
Larry Stahl	95	162	10	32	.198	3	10	3
Walt Hriniak	31	66	4	15	.227	0	1	0
Jerry DaVanon	24	59	4	8	.136	0	3	0
Bill Davis	31	57	1	10	.175	0	1	0
Jerry Morales	19	41	5	8	.195	1	6	0
Fred Kendall	10	26	2	4	.154	0	0	0
Jim Williams	13	25	4	7	.280	0	2	0
Ron Slocum	13	24	6	7	.292	1	5	0
Sonny Ruberto	17	21	3	3	.143	0	0	0
Rafael Robles	6	20	1	2	.100	0	0	1
Chris Krug	8	17	0	1	.059	0	0	0
Frankie Librán	10	10	1	1	.100	0	1	0

=== Pitching ===
= Indicates league leader

==== Starting pitchers ====
Note: G = Games pitched; IP = Innings pitched; W = Wins; L = Losses; ERA = Earned run average; SO = Strikeouts

Player	G	IP	W	L	ERA	SO
Clay Kirby	35	215.2	7	20	3.80	113
Joe Niekro	37	202.0	8	17	3.70	55
Al Santorini	32	184.2	8	14	3.95	111
Dick Kelley	27	136.0	4	8	3.57	96
Dick Selma	4	22.0	2	2	4.09	20
Al McBean	1	7.0	0	1	5.14	1

==== Other pitchers ====
Note: G = Games pitched; IP = Innings pitched; W = Wins; L = Losses; ERA = Earned run average; SO = Strikeouts

Player	G	IP	W	L	ERA	SO
Tommie Sisk	53	143.0	2	13	4.78	59
Gary Ross	46	109.2	3	12	4.19	58
Johnny Podres	17	64.2	5	6	4.31	17
Dave Roberts	22	48.2	0	3	4.81	19
Mike Corkins	6	17.0	1	3	8.47	13
Steve Arlin	4	10.2	0	1	9.28	9

==== Relief pitchers ====
Note: G = Games pitched; W = Wins; L = Losses; SV = Saves; ERA = Earned run average; SO = Strikeouts

Player	G	W	L	SV	ERA	SO
Billy McCool	54	3	5	7	4.30	35
Frank Reberger	67	1	2	6	3.59	65
Jack Baldschun	61	7	2	1	4.79	67
Tom Dukes	13	1	0	1	7.25	15
Leon Everitt	5	0	1	0	8.04	11

== Award winners ==
1969 Major League Baseball All-Star Game

- Chris Cannizzaro, catcher, reserve

== Farm system ==
Level	Team	League	Manager
AA	Elmira Pioneers	Eastern League	Harry Bright
A	Key West Padres	Florida State League	Don Zimmer
Rookie	Salt Lake City Bees	Pioneer League	Dave Garcia

Elmira affiliation shared with Kansas City Royals
