= 1970 San Diego Padres season =

1970 San Diego Padres
- League: National League
- Division: West
- Ballpark: San Diego Stadium
- City: San Diego, California
- Record: 63–99 (.389)
- Divisional place: 6th
- Owners: C. Arnholdt Smith
- General managers: Buzzie Bavasi
- Managers: Preston Gómez
- Television: KOGO
- Radio: KOGO (Duke Snider, Frank Sims, Jerry Gross)

The 1970 San Diego Padres season was the second season in franchise history. The Padres improved by 11 wins from their inaugural season in 1969.

== Offseason ==
- January 17, 1970: John Scott was drafted by the Padres in the 1st round (2nd pick) of the 1970 Major League Baseball draft (January).

== Regular season ==
- June 12, 1970: Dock Ellis of the Pittsburgh Pirates threw a no-hitter against the Padres. The rumour is that Dock Ellis pitched the no-hitter on acid. The way Ellis tells the story, in Donald Hall's book, "In the Country of Baseball", the Pirates were starting a west-coast road trip. After the Pirates landed in San Diego, Ellis visited his hometown of L.A. for a party. Ellis forgot he was slated to pitch the next day. So he started doing acid the night before the game, and around 10 a.m., after catching maybe an hour of sleep, he realized he was in the wrong place.

=== Opening Day lineup ===
- Ollie Brown
- Dave Campbell
- Chris Cannizzaro
- Nate Colbert
- Tommy Dean
- Pat Dobson
- Cito Gaston
- Van Kelly
- Jerry Morales

=== Season standings ===
NL West
Team	W	L	Pct.	GB	Home	Road
Cincinnati Reds	102	60	.630	—	57‍–‍24	45‍–‍36
Los Angeles Dodgers	87	74	.540	14½	39‍–‍42	48‍–‍32
San Francisco Giants	86	76	.531	16	48‍–‍33	38‍–‍43
Houston Astros	79	83	.488	23	44‍–‍37	35‍–‍46
Atlanta Braves	76	86	.469	26	42‍–‍39	34‍–‍47
San Diego Padres	63	99	.389	39	31‍–‍50	32‍–‍49

=== Record vs. opponents ===
1970 National League record Sources:
Team	ATL	CHC	CIN	HOU	LAD	MON	NYM	PHI	PIT	SD	SF	STL
Atlanta	—	8–4	5–13	9–9	6–12	6–6	6–6	7–5	6–6	9–9	7–11	7–5
Chicago	4–8	—	7–5	7–5	6–6	13–5	7–11	9–9	8–10	9–3	7–5	7–11
Cincinnati	13–5	5–7	—	15–3	13–5	7–5	8–4	7–5	8–4	8–10	9–9	9–3
Houston	9–9	5–7	3–15	—	8–10	8–4	6–6	4–8	6–6	14–4	10–8	6–6
Los Angeles	12–6	6–6	5–13	10–8	—	8–4	7–5	6–5	6–6	11–7	9–9	7–5
Montreal	6–6	5–13	5–7	4–8	4–8	—	10–8	11–7	9–9	6–6	6–6	7–11
New York	6–6	11–7	4–8	6–6	5–7	8–10	—	13–5	6–12	6–6	6–6	12–6
Philadelphia	5-7	9–9	5–7	8–4	5–6	7–11	5–13	—	4–14	9–3	8–4	8–10
Pittsburgh	6–6	10–8	4–8	6–6	6–6	9–9	12–6	14–4	—	6–6	4–8	12–6
San Diego	9–9	3–9	10–8	4–14	7–11	6–6	6–6	3–9	6–6	—	5–13	4–8
San Francisco	11–7	5–7	9–9	8–10	9–9	6–6	6–6	4–8	8–4	13–5	—	7–5
St. Louis	5–7	11–7	3–9	6–6	5–7	11–7	6–12	10–8	6–12	8–4	5–7	—

=== Notable transactions ===
- June 4, 1970: Dan Spillner was drafted by the Padres in the 2nd round of the 1970 Major League Baseball draft.

=== Roster ===
1970 San Diego Padres
Roster
Pitchers: 17,41 Steve Arlin; 27 Jack Baldschun; 46 Danny Coombs; 30 Mike Corkins; 37 Pat Dobson; 31 Paul Doyle; 44 Tom Dukes; 34 Ron Herbel; 43 Clay Kirby; 34 Jerry Nyman; 15 Dave Roberts; 31 Roberto Rodríguez; 33 Gary Ross; 23 Al Santorini; 22 Ron Willis; 40 Earl Wilson	Catchers: 1 Bob Barton; 8 Chris Cannizzaro; 16 Fred Kendall; 12 Ron Slocum; Infielders: 5 José Arcia; 10 Dave Campbell; 17 Nate Colbert; 3 Tommy Dean; 25 Steve Huntz; 16 Van Kelly; 6,49 Rafael Robles; 7 Ed Spiezio; 11 Ray Webster	Outfielders: 26 Ollie Brown; 9 Al Ferrara; 21 Cito Gaston; 32 Jerry Morales; 20 Ivan Murrell; 34 Dave Robinson; 14 Larry Stahl; 39 Jim Williams	Manager: 18 Preston Gómez; Coaches: 38 Roger Craig (Pitching); 2 Dave Garcia (First Base); 4 Bob Skinner (Hitting & Third Base); 19 Whitey Wietelmann (Bullpen)

== Player stats ==
= Indicates team leader

=== Batting ===
==== Starters by position ====
Note: Pos = Position; G = Games played; AB = At bats; H = Hits; Avg. = Batting average; HR = Home runs; RBI = Runs batted in

Pos	Player	G	AB	H	Avg.	HR	RBI
C	Chris Cannizzaro	111	341	95	.279	5	42
1B	Nate Colbert	156	572	148	.259	38	86
2B	Dave Campbell	154	581	127	.219	12	40
SS	Tommy Dean	61	158	35	.222	2	13
3B	Ed Spezio	110	316	90	.285	12	42
LF	Al Ferrara	138	372	103	.277	13	51
CF	Cito Gaston	146	584	186	.318	29	93
RF	Ollie Brown	139	534	156	.292	23	89

==== Other batters ====
Note: G = Games played; AB = At bats; H = Hits; Avg. = Batting average; HR = Home runs; RBI = Runs batted in

Player	G	AB	H	Avg.	HR	RBI
Steve Huntz	106	352	77	.219	11	37
Ivan Murrell	125	347	85	.245	12	35
José Arcia	114	229	51	.223	0	17
Bob Barton	61	188	41	.218	4	16
Ray Webster	95	116	30	.259	2	11
Van Kelly	38	89	15	.169	1	9
Rafael Robles	23	89	19	.213	0	3
Ron Slocum	60	71	10	.141	1	11
Larry Stahl	52	66	12	.182	0	3
Jerry Morales	28	58	9	.155	1	4
Dave Robinson	15	38	12	.316	2	6
Jim Williams	11	14	4	.286	0	0
Fred Kendall	4	9	0	.000	0	1

=== Pitching ===
==== Starting pitchers ====
Note: G = Games pitched; IP = Innings pitched; W = Wins; L = Losses; ERA = Earned run average; SO = Strikeouts

Player	G	IP	W	L	ERA	SO
Pat Dobson	40	251.0	14	15	3.76	185
Clay Kirby	36	214.2	10	16	4.53	154
Danny Coombs	35	188.1	10	14	3.30	105
Mike Corkins	24	111.0	5	6	4.62	75
Steve Arlin	2	12.2	1	0	2.84	3
Jerry Nyman	2	5.1	0	2	15.19	2

==== Other pitchers ====
Note: G = Games pitched; IP = Innings pitched; W = Wins; L = Losses; ERA = Earned run average; SO = Strikeouts

Player	G	IP	W	L	ERA	SO
Dave Roberts	43	181.1	8	14	3.81	102
Al Santorini	21	75.2	1	8	6.07	41
Earl Wilson	15	65.0	1	6	4.85	29

==== Relief pitchers ====
Note: G = Games pitched; W = Wins; L = Losses; SV = Saves; ERA = Earned run average; SO = Strikeouts

Player	G	W	L	SV	ERA	SO
Tom Dukes	53	1	6	10	4.04	56
Ron Herbel	64	7	5	9	4.95	53
Ron Willis	42	2	2	4	4.02	20
Gary Ross	33	2	3	1	5.20	39
Jack Baldschun	12	1	0	0	10.13	12
Roberto Rodríguez	10	0	0	3	6.61	8
Paul Doyle	9	0	2	2	6.43	2

== Award winners ==
1970 Major League Baseball All-Star Game

- Cito Gaston, outfield, reserve

== Farm system ==
Level	Team	League	Manager
AAA	Salt Lake City Bees	Pacific Coast League	Don Zimmer
AA	Elmira Pioneers	Eastern League	Harry Malmberg
A	Lodi Padres	California League	Sonny Ruberto and Ken Bracey
A-Short Season	Tri-City Padres	Northwest League	Marty Keough

Elmira affiliation shared with Kansas City Royals
