= 1972 San Diego Padres season =

1972 San Diego Padres
- League: National League
- Division: West
- Ballpark: San Diego Stadium
- City: San Diego, California
- Record: 58–95 (.379)
- Divisional place: 6h
- Owners: C. Arnholdt Smith
- General managers: Buzzie Bavasi
- Managers: Preston Gómez, Don Zimmer
- Television: KCST
- Radio: KOGO (Jerry Coleman, Bob Chandler)

The 1972 San Diego Padres season was the fourth season in franchise history.

== Offseason ==
- January 12, 1972: Rich Troedson was drafted by the Padres in the 1st round (6th pick) of the secondary phase of the 1972 Major League Baseball draft.

== Regular season ==
Until 2021, no Padres pitcher had ever thrown a no-hitter. On July 18 against the Philadelphia Phillies, Steve Arlin came within one out of a no-hitter before a Denny Doyle single broke up the bid.

=== Season standings ===
NL West
| Team | W | L | Pct. | GB | Home | Road |
|---|---|---|---|---|---|---|
| Cincinnati Reds | 95 | 59 | .617 | — | 42‍–‍34 | 53‍–‍25 |
| Houston Astros | 84 | 69 | .549 | 10½ | 41‍–‍36 | 43‍–‍33 |
| Los Angeles Dodgers | 85 | 70 | .548 | 10½ | 41‍–‍34 | 44‍–‍36 |
| Atlanta Braves | 70 | 84 | .455 | 25 | 36‍–‍41 | 34‍–‍43 |
| San Francisco Giants | 69 | 86 | .445 | 26½ | 34‍–‍43 | 35‍–‍43 |
| San Diego Padres | 58 | 95 | .379 | 36½ | 26‍–‍54 | 32‍–‍41 |

=== Record vs. opponents ===
1972 National League record Sources:
| Team | ATL | CHC | CIN | HOU | LAD | MON | NYM | PHI | PIT | SD | SF | STL |
|---|---|---|---|---|---|---|---|---|---|---|---|---|
| Atlanta | — | 5–7–1 | 9–9 | 7–7 | 7–8 | 4–8 | 7–5 | 6–6 | 6–6 | 6–11 | 7–11 | 6–6 |
| Chicago | 7–5–1 | — | 8–4 | 3–9 | 8–4 | 10–5 | 10–8 | 10–7 | 3–12 | 9–3 | 7–5 | 10–8 |
| Cincinnati | 9–9 | 4–8 | — | 11–6 | 9–5 | 8–4 | 8–4 | 10–2 | 8–4 | 8–10 | 10–5 | 10–2 |
| Houston | 7–7 | 9–3 | 6–11 | — | 7–11 | 8–4 | 6–6 | 9–3 | 3–9 | 12–2 | 13–5 | 4–8 |
| Los Angeles | 8–7 | 4–8 | 5–9 | 11–7 | — | 6–6 | 7–5 | 7–5 | 7–5 | 13–5 | 9–9 | 8–4 |
| Montreal | 8–4 | 5–10 | 4–8 | 4–8 | 6–6 | — | 6–12 | 10–6 | 6–12 | 6–6 | 6–6 | 9–8 |
| New York | 5–7 | 8–10 | 4–8 | 6–6 | 5–7 | 12–6 | — | 13–5 | 8–6 | 7–5 | 8–4 | 7–9 |
| Philadelphia | 6-6 | 7–10 | 2–10 | 3–9 | 5–7 | 6–10 | 5–13 | — | 5–13 | 6–6 | 6–6 | 8–7 |
| Pittsburgh | 6–6 | 12–3 | 4–8 | 9–3 | 5–7 | 12–6 | 6–8 | 13–5 | — | 10–2 | 9–3 | 10–8 |
| San Diego | 11–6 | 3–9 | 10–8 | 2–12 | 5–13 | 6–6 | 5–7 | 6–6 | 2–10 | — | 4–10 | 4–8 |
| San Francisco | 11–7 | 5–7 | 5–10 | 5–13 | 9–9 | 6–6 | 4–8 | 6–6 | 3–9 | 10–4 | — | 5–7 |
| St. Louis | 6–6 | 8–10 | 2–10 | 8–4 | 4–8 | 8–9 | 9–7 | 7–8 | 8–10 | 8–4 | 7–5 | — |

=== Opening Day starters ===
- Bob Barton
- Dave Campbell
- Nate Colbert
- Enzo Hernández
- Clay Kirby
- Leron Lee
- Jerry Morales
- Larry Stahl
- Derrel Thomas

=== Notable transactions ===
- May 17, 1972: Ollie Brown was traded by the Padres to the Oakland Athletics for Curt Blefary, Mike Kilkenny and a player to be named later. The Athletics completed the deal by sending Greg Schubert (minors) to the Padres on September 11.
- June 6, 1972: 1972 Major League Baseball draft
  - Randy Jones was drafted by the Padres in the 5th round.
  - Warren Cromartie was drafted by the Padres in the 1st round (5th pick) of the Secondary Phase, but did not sign.

=== Roster ===
1972 San Diego Padres
Roster
| Pitchers: 37 Ed Acosta; 22 Steve Arlin; 23 Mike Caldwell; 30 Mike Corkins; 13 Ralph Garcia; 27 Bill Greif; 25 Mike Kilkenny; 43 Clay Kirby; 35 Fred Norman; 36 Tom Phoebus; 33 Gary Ross; 44 Mark Schaeffer; 42 Al Severinsen; 36 Steve Simpson; 42 Ron Taylor | Catchers: 1 Bob Barton; 3 Curt Blefary; 28 Pat Corrales; 7 Joe Goddard; 16 Fred Kendall; Infielders: 10 Dave Campbell; 17 Nate Colbert; 11 Enzo Hernández; 18 Dave Hilton; 12 Garry Jestadt; 6 Don Mason; 20 Dave Roberts; 31 Rafael Robles; 7 Ed Spiezio; 6 Fred Stanley; 30 Derrel Thomas | Outfielders: 26 Ollie Brown; 10 Randy Elliott; 21 Cito Gaston; 1 Johnny Grubb; 8 Johnny Jeter; 24 Leron Lee; 32 Jerry Morales; 20 Ivan Murrell; 14 Larry Stahl; Other batters: 1 Mike Fiore | Manager: 18 Preston Gómez (4/15 - 4/26); 9 Don Zimmer (4/27 - 10/4); Coaches: 38 Roger Craig (Pitching); 2 Dave Garcia (First Base); 4 Bob Skinner (Hitting & Third Base, 4/27 - 10/4); 19 Whitey Wietelmann (Bullpen); 9 Don Zimmer (Third Base, 4/15 - 4/26) |

== Player stats ==
| = Indicates team leader |

=== Batting ===
==== Starters by position ====
Note: Pos = Position; G = Games played; AB = At bats; H = Hits; Avg. = Batting average; HR = Home runs; RBI = Runs batted in

| Pos | Player | G | AB | H | Avg. | HR | RBI |
|---|---|---|---|---|---|---|---|
| C | Fred Kendall | 91 | 273 | 59 | .216 | 6 | 18 |
| 1B | Nate Colbert | 151 | 563 | 141 | .250 | 38 | 111 |
| 2B | Derrel Thomas | 130 | 500 | 115 | .230 | 5 | 36 |
| SS | Enzo Hernández | 114 | 329 | 64 | .195 | 1 | 15 |
| 3B | Dave Roberts | 100 | 418 | 102 | .244 | 5 | 33 |
| LF | Leron Lee | 101 | 370 | 111 | .300 | 12 | 47 |
| CF | Johnny Jeter | 110 | 326 | 72 | .221 | 7 | 21 |
| RF | Cito Gaston | 111 | 379 | 102 | .269 | 7 | 44 |

==== Other batters ====
Note: G = Games played; AB = At bats; H = Hits; Avg. = Batting average; HR = Home runs; RBI = Runs batted in

| Player | G | AB | H | Avg. | HR | RBI |
|---|---|---|---|---|---|---|
| Jerry Morales | 115 | 347 | 83 | .239 | 4 | 18 |
| Larry Stahl | 107 | 297 | 67 | .226 | 7 | 20 |
| Garry Jestadt | 92 | 256 | 63 | .246 | 6 | 22 |
| Pat Corrales | 44 | 117 | 23 | .193 | 0 | 6 |
| Curt Blefary | 74 | 102 | 20 | .196 | 3 | 9 |
| Dave Campbell | 33 | 100 | 24 | .240 | 0 | 3 |
| Bob Barton | 29 | 88 | 17 | .193 | 0 | 9 |
| Fred Stanley | 39 | 85 | 17 | .200 | 0 | 2 |
| Ollie Brown | 23 | 70 | 12 | .171 | 0 | 3 |
| Randy Elliott | 14 | 49 | 10 | .204 | 0 | 6 |
| Dave Hilton | 13 | 47 | 10 | .213 | 0 | 5 |
| Joe Goddard | 12 | 35 | 7 | .200 | 0 | 2 |
| Ed Spezio | 20 | 29 | 4 | .138 | 0 | 4 |
| Rafael Robles | 18 | 24 | 4 | .167 | 0 | 0 |
| Johnny Grubb | 7 | 21 | 7 | .333 | 0 | 1 |
| Don Mason | 9 | 11 | 2 | .182 | 0 | 0 |
| Ivan Murrell | 5 | 7 | 1 | .143 | 0 | 1 |
| Mike Fiore | 7 | 6 | 0 | .000 | 0 | 0 |

=== Pitching ===
==== Starting pitchers ====
Note: G = Games pitched; IP = Innings pitched; W = Wins; L = Losses; ERA = Earned run average; SO = Strikeouts

| Player | G | IP | W | L | ERA | SO |
|---|---|---|---|---|---|---|
| Steve Arlin | 38 | 250.0 | 10 | 21 | 3.60 | 159 |
| Clay Kirby | 34 | 238.2 | 12 | 14 | 3.13 | 175 |
| Fred Norman | 42 | 211.2 | 9 | 11 | 3.44 | 167 |
| Tom Phoebus | 1 | 5.2 | 0 | 1 | 7.94 | 8 |

==== Other pitchers ====
Note: G = Games pitched; IP = Innings pitched; W = Wins; L = Losses; ERA = Earned run average; SO = Strikeouts

| Player | G | IP | W | L | ERA | SO |
|---|---|---|---|---|---|---|
| Mike Caldwell | 42 | 163.2 | 7 | 11 | 4.01 | 102 |
| Mike Corkins | 47 | 140.0 | 6 | 9 | 3.54 | 108 |
| Bill Greif | 34 | 125.1 | 5 | 16 | 5.60 | 91 |

Mike Corkins was the team leader in saves with 6.

==== Relief pitchers ====
Note: G = Games pitched; W = Wins; L = Losses; SV = Saves; ERA = Earned run average; SO = Strikeouts

| Player | G | W | L | SV | ERA | SO |
|---|---|---|---|---|---|---|
| Gary Ross | 60 | 4 | 3 | 3 | 2.45 | 46 |
| Ed Acosta | 46 | 3 | 6 | 0 | 4.45 | 53 |
| Mark Schaeffer | 41 | 2 | 0 | 1 | 4.61 | 25 |
| Al Severinsen | 17 | 0 | 1 | 1 | 2.53 | 9 |
| Steve Simpson | 9 | 0 | 2 | 2 | 4.76 | 9 |
| Mike Kilkenny | 5 | 0 | 0 | 0 | 8.31 | 5 |
| Ron Taylor | 4 | 0 | 0 | 0 | 12.60 | 0 |
| Ralph Garcia | 3 | 0 | 0 | 0 | 1.80 | 3 |

== Awards and honors ==
1972 Major League Baseball All-Star Game

- Nate Colbert, reserve

Colbert scored the winning run, but he brought the wrong uniform with him to Atlanta. The San Diego Padres' slugger donned his road jersey with SAN DIEGO on it instead of his home one with PADRES on it.

One week later, Colbert returned to Atlanta Stadium and tied Stan Musial's Major League record with five home runs in a doubleheader vs. the Braves. Colbert also drove in 13 runs during the twinbill, which San Diego swept 9–0 and 11–7.

== Farm system ==
| Level | Team | League | Manager |
|---|---|---|---|
| AAA | Hawaii Islanders | Pacific Coast League | Rocky Bridges |
| AA | Alexandria Aces | Texas League | Duke Snider |
| A-Short Season | Tri-City Padres | Northwest League | Cliff Ditto |
