= List of San Diego Padres minor league affiliates =

Current San Diego Padres domestic minor league affiliate locations

The San Diego Padres are an American professional baseball team based in San Diego. The Padres compete in Major League Baseball (MLB) as a member club of the National League (NL) West Division. The team's farm system consists of seven Minor League Baseball affiliates across the United States and in the Dominican Republic. Four affiliates are independently owned, while three—the Arizona Complex League Padres and two Dominican Summer League Padres squads—are owned by the major league club.

The Padres have been affiliated with the High-A Fort Wayne TinCaps of the Midwest League since 1999, making it the longest-running affiliation in the organization among teams not owned by the Padres. Their newest affiliate is the San Antonio Missions of the Texas League, which became the Padres' Double-A club in 2021.

Geographically, San Diego's closest domestic affiliate is the Single-A Lake Elsinore Storm of the California League, which is approximately 66 miles (106 km) away. San Diego's furthest domestic affiliate is the Fort Wayne TinCaps some 1,849 miles (2,976 km) away.

== Current affiliates ==
The San Diego Padres farm system consists of seven minor league affiliates.

Class	Team	League	Location	Ballpark	Affiliated
Triple-A	El Paso Chihuahuas	Pacific Coast League	El Paso, Texas	Southwest University Park	2014
Double-A	San Antonio Missions	Texas League	San Antonio, Texas	Nelson W. Wolff Municipal Stadium	2021
High-A	Fort Wayne TinCaps	Midwest League	Fort Wayne, Indiana	Parkview Field	1999
Single-A	Lake Elsinore Storm	California League	Lake Elsinore, California	Lake Elsinore Diamond	2001
Rookie	ACL Padres	Arizona Complex League	Peoria, Arizona	Peoria Sports Complex	2021
Rookie	DSL Padres Brown	Dominican Summer League	Boca Chica, Santo Domingo	San Diego Padres Complex	2023
Rookie	DSL Padres Gold	Dominican Summer League	Boca Chica, Santo Domingo	San Diego Padres Complex	2023

== Past affiliates ==
=== Key ===
Season	Each year is linked to an article about that particular Padres season.

=== 1969–1989 ===
Prior to the 1963 season, Major League Baseball (MLB) initiated a reorganization of Minor League Baseball that resulted in a reduction from six classes to four (Triple-A, Double-A, Class A, and Rookie) in response to the general decline of the minors throughout the 1950s and early-1960s when leagues and teams folded due to shrinking attendance caused by baseball fans' preference for staying at home to watch MLB games on television. The only change made within the next 27 years was Class A being subdivided for the first time to form Class A Short Season in 1966.

Season	Triple-A	Double-A	Class A	Class A Short Season	Rookie	Ref.
1969	—	Elmira Pioneers (Note: In 1969 and 1970, the Padres shared the Double-A Elmira Pioneers with the Kansas City Royals.)	Key West Padres	—	Salt Lake City Bees	
1970	Salt Lake City Bees	Elmira Pioneers	Lodi Padres	Tri-City Padres	—	
1971	Hawaii Islanders	—	Lodi Padres	Tri-City Padres	—	
1972	Hawaii Islanders	Alexandria Aces	—	Walla Walla Islanders; Tri-City Padres	—	
1973	Hawaii Islanders	Alexandria Aces	—	Walla Walla Padres	—	
1974	Hawaii Islanders	Alexandria Aces	—	Walla Walla Padres	—	
1975	Hawaii Islanders	Alexandria Aces	Reno Silver Sox (Note: In 1975 and 1976, the Padres shared the Class A Reno Silver Sox with the Minnesota Twins.)	Walla Walla Padres	—	
1976	Hawaii Islanders	Amarillo Gold Sox	Reno Silver Sox	Walla Walla Padres	—	
1977	Hawaii Islanders	Amarillo Gold Sox	Reno Silver Sox	Walla Walla Padres	—	
1978	Hawaii Islanders	Amarillo Gold Sox	Reno Silver Sox	Walla Walla Padres	—	
1979	Hawaii Islanders	Amarillo Gold Sox	Reno Silver Sox	Walla Walla Padres	—	
1980	Hawaii Islanders	Amarillo Gold Sox	Reno Silver Sox	Walla Walla Padres	—	
1981	Hawaii Islanders	Amarillo Gold Sox	Reno Silver Sox; Salem Redbirds	Walla Walla Padres	GCL Padres	
1982	Hawaii Islanders	Amarillo Gold Sox	Reno Padres; Salem Redbirds	Walla Walla Padres	GCL Padres	
1983	Las Vegas Stars	Beaumont Golden Gators	Miami Marlins; Reno Padres; Salem Redbirds	Spokane Indians	—	
1984	Las Vegas Stars	Beaumont Golden Gators	Miami Marlins; Reno Padres	Spokane Indians	—	
1985	Las Vegas Stars	Beaumont Golden Gators	Charleston Rainbows; Reno Padres	Spokane Indians	—	
1986	Las Vegas Stars	Beaumont Golden Gators	Charleston Rainbows; Reno Padres	Spokane Indians	—	
1987	Las Vegas Stars	Wichita Pilots	Charleston Rainbows; Reno Padres	Spokane Indians	—	
1988	Las Vegas Stars	Wichita Pilots	Charleston Rainbows; Riverside Red Wave	Spokane Indians	AZL Padres	
1989	Las Vegas Stars	Wichita Wranglers	Charleston Rainbows; Riverside Red Wave	Spokane Indians	AZL Padres	

=== 1990–2020 ===
Minor League Baseball operated with six classes from 1990 to 2020. In 1990, the Class A level was subdivided for a second time with the creation of Class A-Advanced. The Rookie level consisted of domestic and foreign circuits.

Season	Triple-A	Double-A	Class A-Advanced	Class A	Class A Short Season	Rookie	Foreign Rookie	Ref(s).
1990	Las Vegas Stars	Wichita Wranglers	Riverside Red Wave	Charleston Rainbows; Waterloo Diamonds	Spokane Indians	AZL Padres	DSL Padres/Red Sox/Tigers	
1991	Las Vegas Stars	Wichita Wranglers	High Desert Mavericks	Charleston Rainbows; Waterloo Diamonds	Spokane Indians	AZL Padres	DSL Padres/Angels/Dodgers	
1992	Las Vegas Stars	Wichita Wranglers	High Desert Mavericks	Charleston Rainbows; Waterloo Diamonds	Spokane Indians	AZL Padres	DSL Padres/Yankees	
1993	Las Vegas Stars	Wichita Wranglers	Rancho Cucamonga Quakes	Waterloo Diamonds	Spokane Indians	AZL Padres	DSL Padres/Yankees	
1994	Las Vegas Stars	Wichita Wranglers	Rancho Cucamonga Quakes	Springfield Sultans	Spokane Indians	AZL Padres	DSL Padres/Cubs	
1995	Las Vegas Stars	Memphis Chicks	Rancho Cucamonga Quakes	Clinton LumberKings	—	Idaho Falls Braves; AZL Padres	DSL Padres/Cubs	
1996	Las Vegas Stars	Memphis Chicks	Rancho Cucamonga Quakes	Clinton LumberKings	—	Idaho Falls Braves; AZL Padres	DSL Padres/Cubs	
1997	Las Vegas Stars	Mobile BayBears	Rancho Cucamonga Quakes	Clinton LumberKings	—	Idaho Falls Braves; AZL Padres	DSL Padres	
1998	Las Vegas Stars	Mobile BayBears	Rancho Cucamonga Quakes	Clinton LumberKings	—	Idaho Falls Braves; AZL Padres	DSL Padres	
1999	Las Vegas Stars	Mobile BayBears	Rancho Cucamonga Quakes	Fort Wayne Wizards	—	Idaho Falls Braves; AZL Padres	DSL Padres	
2000	Las Vegas Stars	Mobile BayBears	Rancho Cucamonga Quakes	Fort Wayne Wizards	—	Idaho Falls Padres; AZL Padres	DSL Padres	
2001	Portland Beavers	Mobile BayBears	Lake Elsinore Storm	Fort Wayne Wizards	Eugene Emeralds	Idaho Falls Padres	DSL Padres	
2002	Portland Beavers	Mobile BayBears	Lake Elsinore Storm	Fort Wayne Wizards	Eugene Emeralds	Idaho Falls Padres	DSL Padres; VSL Chivacoa (Note: In 2002, the Padres operated a Venezuelan Summer League team as a co-op with the Pittsburgh Pirates.)	
2003	Portland Beavers	Mobile BayBears	Lake Elsinore Storm	Fort Wayne Wizards	Eugene Emeralds	Idaho Falls Padres	DSL Padres; VSL Tronconero 1 (Note: In 2003, the Padres operated a Venezuelan Summer League team as a co-op with the Minnesota Twins.)	
2004	Portland Beavers	Mobile BayBears	Lake Elsinore Storm	Fort Wayne Wizards	Eugene Emeralds	AZL Padres	DSL Padres; VSL Universidad de Carabobo (Note: In 2003, the Padres operated a Venezuelan Summer League team as a co-op with the Florida Marlins.)	
2005	Portland Beavers	Mobile BayBears	Lake Elsinore Storm	Fort Wayne Wizards	Eugene Emeralds	AZL Padres	DSL Padres; VSL Padres/Red Sox	
2006	Portland Beavers	Mobile BayBears	Lake Elsinore Storm	Fort Wayne Wizards	Eugene Emeralds	AZL Padres	DSL Padres	
2007	Portland Beavers	San Antonio Missions	Lake Elsinore Storm	Fort Wayne Wizards	Eugene Emeralds	AZL Padres	DSL Padres	
2008	Portland Beavers	San Antonio Missions	Lake Elsinore Storm	Fort Wayne Wizards	Eugene Emeralds	AZL Padres	DSL Padres	
2009	Portland Beavers	San Antonio Missions	Lake Elsinore Storm	Fort Wayne TinCaps	Eugene Emeralds	AZL Padres	DSL Padres	
2010	Portland Beavers	San Antonio Missions	Lake Elsinore Storm	Fort Wayne TinCaps	Eugene Emeralds	AZL Padres	DSL Padres	
2011	Tucson Padres	San Antonio Missions	Lake Elsinore Storm	Fort Wayne TinCaps	Eugene Emeralds	AZL Padres	DSL Padres	
2012	Tucson Padres	San Antonio Missions	Lake Elsinore Storm	Fort Wayne TinCaps	Eugene Emeralds	AZL Padres	DSL Padres	
2013	Tucson Padres	San Antonio Missions	Lake Elsinore Storm	Fort Wayne TinCaps	Eugene Emeralds	AZL Padres	DSL Padres	
2014	El Paso Chihuahuas	San Antonio Missions	Lake Elsinore Storm	Fort Wayne TinCaps	Eugene Emeralds	AZL Padres	DSL Padres	
2015	El Paso Chihuahuas	San Antonio Missions	Lake Elsinore Storm	Fort Wayne TinCaps	Tri-City Dust Devils	AZL Padres	DSL Padres	
2016	El Paso Chihuahuas	San Antonio Missions	Lake Elsinore Storm	Fort Wayne TinCaps	Tri-City Dust Devils	AZL Padres	DSL Padres	
2017	El Paso Chihuahuas	San Antonio Missions	Lake Elsinore Storm	Fort Wayne TinCaps	Tri-City Dust Devils	AZL Padres 1 AZL Padres 2	DSL Padres	
2018	El Paso Chihuahuas	San Antonio Missions	Lake Elsinore Storm	Fort Wayne TinCaps	Tri-City Dust Devils	AZL Padres 1 AZL Padres 2	DSL Padres	
2019	El Paso Chihuahuas	Amarillo Sod Poodles	Lake Elsinore Storm	Fort Wayne TinCaps	Tri-City Dust Devils	AZL Padres 1 AZL Padres 2	DSL Padres	
2020 (Note: The 2020 Minor League Baseball season was cancelled due to the COVID-19 pandemic.)	El Paso Chihuahuas	Amarillo Sod Poodles	Lake Elsinore Storm	Fort Wayne TinCaps	Tri-City Dust Devils	AZL Padres 1 AZL Padres 2	DSL Padres	

=== 2021–present ===
The current structure of Minor League Baseball is the result of an overall contraction of the system beginning with the 2021 season. Class A was reduced to two levels: High-A and Low-A. Low-A was reclassified as Single-A in 2022.

Season	Triple-A	Double-A	High-A	Single-A	Rookie	Foreign Rookie	Ref.
2021	El Paso Chihuahuas	San Antonio Missions	Fort Wayne TinCaps	Lake Elsinore Storm	ACL Padres	DSL Padres	
2022	El Paso Chihuahuas	San Antonio Missions	Fort Wayne TinCaps	Lake Elsinore Storm	ACL Padres	DSL Padres	
2023	El Paso Chihuahuas	San Antonio Missions	Fort Wayne TinCaps	Lake Elsinore Storm	ACL Padres	DSL Padres Brown; DSL Padres Gold	
2024	El Paso Chihuahuas	San Antonio Missions	Fort Wayne TinCaps	Lake Elsinore Storm	ACL Padres	DSL Padres Brown; DSL Padres Gold	
2025	El Paso Chihuahuas	San Antonio Missions	Fort Wayne TinCaps	Lake Elsinore Storm	ACL Padres	DSL Padres Brown; DSL Padres Gold	
2026	El Paso Chihuahuas	San Antonio Missions	Fort Wayne TinCaps	Lake Elsinore Storm	ACL Padres	DSL Padres Brown; DSL Padres Gold	
