= Tommie Sisk =

American baseball player (born 1942)

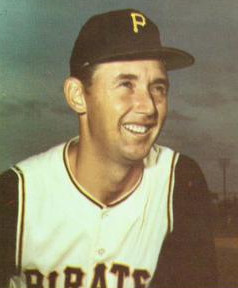
- Sisk in 1966
- Pitcher
- Born: April 12, 1942 (age 84); Ardmore, Oklahoma, U.S.
- Batted: Right Threw: Right

MLB debut
- July 19, 1962, for the Pittsburgh Pirates

Last MLB appearance
- June 14, 1970, for the Chicago White Sox

MLB statistics
- Win–loss record: 40–49
- Earned run average: 3.92
- Strikeouts: 441
- Stats at Baseball Reference

Teams
- Pittsburgh Pirates (1962–1968); San Diego Padres (1969); Chicago White Sox (1970)

Tommie Wayne Sisk (born April 12, 1942) is an American former right-handed Major League Baseball (MLB) pitcher who played from 1962 to 1970 for the Pittsburgh Pirates, San Diego Padres and Chicago White Sox.

Originally signed as an amateur free agent by the Pirates in 1960, he quickly made his way to the big leagues. July 19, 1962 was the date of his major league debut, in which the 20-year-old did not fare too well. Although he started the game, he did not last more than two innings. After 1 1/3 innings pitched, three walks, two hits and three runs surrendered, he was out of the game, which was against the hapless 1962 New York Mets.

He improved during his first season (in which he was the seventh youngest player), however, posting a 4.08 ERA in five games, three of which he started.

1963 was perhaps his best year as a reliever. In 57 games, he posted a 2.92 ERA in 108 innings of work. He walked 45 batters, struck out 73 and had a 1–3 record. His 57 games in 1963 were the fourth most in the league.

In his third year in the big leagues, he really struggled — in 42 games, he posted a 6.16 ERA, allowing 91 hits in 61 1/3 innings of work.

He was used as both a starter and reliever in 1965 and 1966. He appeared in 38 games in the former year, starting 12 of those. He went 7–3 with a respectable 3.40 ERA. He spun a two-hitter that year, on September 20 against the team he made his big league debut against, the New York Mets. Although they got the better of him in their first matchup, Sisk was their master on September 20, 1965. The only two hits he allowed were a second-inning single by John Stephenson and a ninth-inning triple by Johnny Lewis.

In the latter year, he was used more as a starter, appearing in 34 games and starting 23 of those games. He went 10–5 with a 4.14 ERA. He had the sixth-best won-lost percentage in 1966, at .667.

1967 was perhaps the best season of his entire career. Used almost entirely as a starter (37 games, 31 started), he posted a 13–13 record with 11 complete games, 2 shutouts and a 3.34 ERA. In 207 2/3 innings, he allowed only six home runs and 196 hits. His 3.34 ERA was the best on his team, among all pitchers with at least 10 games started. He was tenth in the league in complete games that year. He was also fifth in the league in walks allowed (with 78) and ninth in losses.

Sisk went 5–5 with a 3.28 ERA in 1968. He appeared in 33 games, starting only 11 of them.

On March 28, 1969, Sisk was traded with Chris Cannizzaro to the Padres for Ron Davis and Bobby Klaus. With the Padres in 1969, he posted a 2–13 record in 53 games, 13 of which he started. His ERA was 4.78. As a new expansion team, the Padres struggled that year, and finished the season with a 52–110 record. Fellow reliever Gary Ross went 3–12, while starters Clay Kirby and Joe Niekro went 7–20 and 8–17, respectively.

Sisk was traded to the White Sox on March 30, 1970 for Jerry Nyman. He appeared in 17 games for the White Sox that year, almost entirely as a reliever (he only started one game). He posted a 1–1 record and a 5.40 ERA. He played his final big league game on June 14, 1970. The day after he played his final big league game, he was traded along with Buddy Bradford from the White Sox to the Cleveland Indians for Bob Miller and Barry Moore before the trade deadline on June 15, 1970.

Overall, Sisk went 40–49 in his nine-year career. He appeared in 316 games, 99 of which he started. Of those 99 games, he completed 19, and pitched four shutouts. He had 63 games finished and 10 saves. In 928 1/3 innings of work, he allowed 937 hits, 457 runs, 404 earned runs, 57 home runs and 358 walks. He struck out 441 batters and had a 3.92 ERA. He was a poor batter, hitting .094 in 235 career at-bats.
