= Arcia =

Arcia is a Spanish surname. Notable people with the surname include:

- Edgar Sanabria Arcia (1911–1989), Venezuelan lawyer, diplomat, and politician
- Elizabeth Arcia (born 1997), Nicaraguan footballer
- Francisco Arcia (born 1989), Venezuelan baseball player
- Hashim Arcia (born 1988), Trinidadian footballer
- José Arcia (1943–2016), Cuban baseball player
- Orlando Arcia (born 1994), Venezuelan baseball player
- Oswaldo Arcia (born 1991), Venezuelan baseball player
