= Al McBean =

American baseball player (1938–2024)

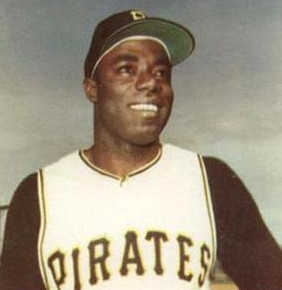
- McBean in 1966
- Pitcher
- Born: May 15, 1938; Charlotte Amalie, United States Virgin Islands
- Died: January 31, 2024 (aged 85); United States Virgin Islands
- Batted: Right Threw: Right

MLB debut
- July 2, 1961, for the Pittsburgh Pirates

Last MLB appearance
- May 10, 1970, for the Pittsburgh Pirates

MLB statistics
- Win–loss record: 67–50
- Earned run average: 3.13
- Strikeouts: 575
- Saves: 63
- Stats at Baseball Reference

Teams
- Pittsburgh Pirates (1961–1968); San Diego Padres (1969); Los Angeles Dodgers (1969–1970); Pittsburgh Pirates (1970)

Alvin O'Neal McBean (May 15, 1938 – January 31, 2024) was a professional baseball player from the United States Virgin Islands. He played in Major League Baseball as a pitcher, most notably for the Pittsburgh Pirates with whom he played the majority of his career.

== St. Thomas tryouts ==
McBean grew up playing baseball in his native Virgin Islands. He was discovered when the Pittsburgh Pirates held a tryout in St. Thomas in 1957. Originally only there to take pictures for a local paper, McBean was convinced by friends to try out, and ended up receiving an invite to Spring training 1958.

== Breaking in with the Pirates ==
After three seasons in the Pirates' farm system, in which he went 28–21 with a 3.57 earned run average, McBean made his major league debut on July 2, 1961 in the first game of a doubleheader against the San Francisco Giants at Forbes Field. Entered a tied game, the first batter he faced, Ed Bailey, reached on an error by second baseman Bill Mazeroski. A double, wild pitch & single later, the Giants had plated two runs. A four run eighth inning by the Pirates spared McBean from taking the loss in his major league debut.

In his next 6 appearances, McBean pitched 10.2 innings without surrendering a run, and earning the first two wins of his career. His first career start also came against the Giants on September 11. He allowed three earned runs over nine innings, and left with the game tied for the no-decision. For the season, he went 3–2 with a 3.75 ERA & 49 strikeouts.

McBean was converted into a full-time starting pitcher in 1962, and won his first three decisions. He finished with a 15–10 record & 3.70 ERA over the full season.

== Latino All-Star ==
McBean was 2–1 with a 3.46 ERA when he was converted into a reliever in May 1963. He was dominant in that role, going 11–2 with a 2.12 ERA and earning eleven saves out of the bullpen. After the season, he joined Roberto Clemente's National League Latino All-stars for a game at the Polo Grounds on October 12. McBean followed Juan Marichal's four scoreless innings pitched with four scoreless of his own, and drove in a run with a sixth inning triple to lead the NL to a 5–2 victory.

== Sporting News Fireman of the Year ==
McBean was even more dominant in 1964. Following a June 27 victory over the Cincinnati Reds, McBean was 3–0 with an 0.69 ERA & eight saves. He earned 21 saves over the season, which was good enough for second place in the NL (to the Houston Colt .45s' Hal Woodeshick). Coupled with his 8–3 record, he was named The Sporting News' NL Fireman of the Year. He was again one of the NL's top relievers in 1965, going 6–6 with a 2.29 ERA & 19 saves.

With Roy Face returning in 1966 from an injury plagued 1965 season, he resumed the closer role. Meanwhile, manager Harry Walker relegated McBean to mop up duty. He appeared in 32 of the Pirates' 70 losses; the Pirates were 15–32 in games he appeared.

== Return to starting ==
Walker was fired midway through the 1967 season, and replaced by his predecessor, Danny Murtaugh. At the time, McBean was 2–1 with a 3.04 ERA & four saves. After sixteen appearances out of the bullpen for Murtaugh, McBean was returned to the starting rotation. He went 4–1 with a 2.11 ERA & five complete games in seven starts for the manager he broke into the big leagues with. He went 9–12 with a 3.58 ERA in 1968.

== 1968 Major League Baseball expansion draft ==
McBean was the 50th player selected in the 1968 Major League Baseball expansion draft by the San Diego Padres. He made just one appearance with the Padres before being dealt to the Los Angeles Dodgers for shortstop Tommy Dean & pitcher Leon Everitt. Again a reliever, McBean went 2–6 with a 3.91 ERA & four saves out of the Dodgers' bullpen. After just one inning pitched with the Dodgers in 1970, McBean was released, and he returned to Pittsburgh. He would make seven appearances, all in relief, before his May 18 release. He would pitch in the Philadelphia Phillies' system into the 1971 season before retiring.

== Career statistics ==
W	L	Pct	ERA	G	GS	CG	SHO	SV	IP	H	ER	R	HR	BB	K	WP	HBP	BAA	Fld%	Avg.
67	50	.573	3.13	409	76	22	5	63	1072.1	1058	373	430	63	365	575	35	30	.262	.931	.197

McBean was a decent hitting pitcher. He had three career home runs, one of which came in his second career at bat. He also hit a grand slam off the St. Louis Cardinals' Larry Jaster.

== Personal life ==
On August 27, 1962, McBean married Olga Santos Negron of Playa de Ponce, whom he had met the previous winter, while pitching in the Puerto Rican Winter League. His Pirates roommate Roberto Clemente served as best man while the bride was given away by 42-year-old rookie reliever Diomedes Olivo.

Upon retirement, McBean returned to the Virgin Islands, and joined the St. Thomas Housing, Parks & Recreation Department. Moving up to deputy commissioner, he chartered the Little League program & beautification projects. He also had a landscaping business. He also opened the Alvin McBean Recreation Complex on St. Thomas.

McBean died on January 31, 2024, at the age of 85.

Awards and achievements
Preceded by Lindy McDaniel	The Sporting News National League Fireman of the Year (1964)	Succeeded by Ted Abernathy
