= Jerry DaVanon =

American baseball player (born 1945)

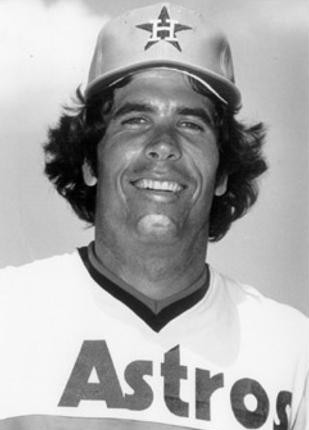
- DaVanon in 1976
- Infielder
- Born: August 21, 1945 (age 81); Oceanside, California, U.S.
- Batted: Right Threw: Right

MLB debut
- April 11, 1969, for the San Diego Padres

Last MLB appearance
- May 4, 1977, for the St. Louis Cardinals

MLB statistics
- Batting average: .234
- Home runs: 3
- Runs batted in: 50
- Hits: 117
- Runs: 73
- Stats at Baseball Reference

Teams
- San Diego Padres (1969); St. Louis Cardinals (1969–1970); Baltimore Orioles (1971); California Angels (1973); St. Louis Cardinals (1974); Houston Astros (1975–1976); St. Louis Cardinals (1977)

Frank Gerald DaVanon (born August 21, 1945) is an American former professional baseball infielder. He played all or part of seven seasons in Major League Baseball (MLB) for the San Diego Padres, St. Louis Cardinals, Baltimore Orioles, California Angels, and Houston Astros.

== Professional career ==
=== First Cardinals stint ===
DaVanon attended Hoover High School (San Diego), CA. He was drafted by the St. Louis Cardinals in the 1st round of the secondary phase of the 1966 MLB amateur draft. He was then selected with the 24th pick in the 1968 Major League Baseball expansion draft by the San Diego Padres, and was a member of their first Opening Day roster in 1969.

=== Padres ===
DaVanon made his major league debut for the Padres on April 11 as a pinch hitter. Then, just six games into the season, the Padres sent their starting shortstop, Rafael Robles, to the minor leagues, and tabbed DaVanon as his replacement. His tenure as Robles' replacement didn't last much longer, as he was benched in mid-May after hitting just .145 in 23 games. After playing just one more game, he was traded back to the Cardinals for Sonny Ruberto and John Sipin.

=== Second Cardinals stint ===
Back with the team that drafted him, DaVanon returned to the minor leagues. He spent most of the rest of 1969 as well as most of 1970 with the Tulsa Oilers, playing in 27 major league games during that time.

=== Orioles ===
DaVanon was acquired by the Baltimore Orioles from the Cardinals for Moe Drabowsky on 30 November 1970. He spent the entire 1971 season with the major league Orioles, serving as a reserve infielder, mainly backing up second baseman Davey Johnson and shortstop Mark Belanger. In his first full season in the majors, he batted .235 in 38 games. After starting the 1972 campaign at Rochester where he batted .213 with one home run and 13 runs batted in (RBI), he was traded to the California Angels for Roger Repoz in a 10 June minor league transaction with the former assigned to Salt Lake City and the latter to the Red Wings.

=== Angels ===
The Angels kept DaVanon in the minors for the rest of the season, and he wound up batting a combined .240 in Triple-A. He returned to the majors the following spring, spending most of 1973 at the end of the Angels' bench. Although he played in 41 games, he came to the plate just 52 times, batting .245. He was sent back to the minors at the end of July, then at the tail end of the season he was traded back to the Cardinals once more, this time for fellow infielder Bill Stein.

=== Third Cardinals stint ===
1974 found DaVanon in a familiar pattern, splitting the year between the Cardinals and the minor leagues. He started the year with Triple-A Tulsa, and was called up in July. He played in 30 games with the Cardinals, batting just .150. On January 3, 1975, his contract was sold to the Detroit Tigers, but he was released just 20 days later. He was signed by the Cleveland Indians on February 19, and then just before Opening Day his contract was sold again, this time to the Houston Astros.

=== Astros ===
DaVanon began the 1975 season in the minor leagues once more. However, in late July, Astros starting shortstop Roger Metzger was injured. Larry Milbourne filled in briefly, but DaVanon was called up on August 1. In his first shot at a starting job in over six years, DaVanon responded with his best hitting as a major leaguer to date, as he batted .274 in 25 games in August, mostly at shortstop but also at second base. He also hit his first major league home run since 1969 on August 11 off Harry Parker of the Cardinals. He finished the season batting .278.

1976 found DaVanon in the majors for the entire season for the first time since 1971. Although he was still relegated to a reserve role behind Metzger and Rob Andrews, he set career highs in almost every category, batting .290 with 20 RBI, which doubled his previous career high of 10, in 61 games. After the season, however, he was headed back to the Cardinals once again, this time being traded with pitcher Larry Dierker for outfielder Bob Detherage and catcher Joe Ferguson.

In the 1976-1977 offseason, he made an appearance on Hollywood Squares as a contestant. At the end of the show, host Peter Marshall said he would appreciate it if he would bobble a ball hit by Pete LaCock, who played for the Chicago Cubs. LaCock is the son of Marshall.

=== Fourth Cardinals stint ===
Despite his 1976 season, DaVanon once again found himself buried at the end of the Cardinals bench behind Garry Templeton, Mike Tyson, Don Kessinger and Mike Phillips. This trade also marked the only time in MLB history that a team has traded for the same player 3 times. In the first month of the season, he was only able to get into nine games, in which he failed to get a hit in eight at bats. He was released on May 11, at which point he retired to return to his home in Houston.

== Personal life ==
DaVanon is the father of former Major League Baseball outfielder Jeff DaVanon. He currently lives in Houston, Texas and officiates high school basketball.
