= 1968 Major League Baseball expansion draft =

General information
- Sport: Baseball
- Date: October 14, 1968

Overview
- 60 total selections
- League: National League (Note: Each portion of the draft was limited to one league; while the National League and American League are commonly referred to collectively as Major League Baseball, across many decades, Major League Baseball has only existed as a legal entity since 2000.)
- Expansion teams: Montreal Expos; San Diego Padres
- Expansion season: 1969
- First selection: Manny Mota (Montreal Expos)

1968 Major League Baseball expansion draft

General information
- Sport: Baseball
- Date: October 15, 1968

Overview
- 60 total selections
- League: American League
- Expansion teams: Kansas City Royals; Seattle Pilots
- Expansion season: 1969
- First selection: Roger Nelson (Kansas City Royals)

The 1968 Major League Baseball expansion draft was conducted to stock up the rosters of four expansion teams in Major League Baseball—two teams each in the American League and National League—created via the 1969 Major League Baseball expansion and that would begin play in the 1969 season.

The expansion draft for the Montreal Expos (Note: The Montreal Expos competed in the National League through the 2004 season; the franchise then relocated to Washington, D.C., and became the Washington Nationals.) and the San Diego Padres was held on October 14, 1968. These two new franchises selected players from other National League teams. The expansion draft for the Kansas City Royals and the Seattle Pilots (Note: After just a single season in the American League, the Seattle Pilots relocated to Milwaukee, Wisconsin, and became the Milwaukee Brewers, who later moved to the National League in 1998.) was held on October 15, 1968. These two new franchises selected players from other American League teams.

== Background ==
1969 major-league expansion teams

=== Montreal Expos ===
On December 2, 1967, Gerry Snyder presented a bid for a Montreal franchise to Major League Baseball's team owners at their winter meetings in Mexico City. One potential wild card in Montreal's favor was that the chair of the National League's expansion committee was influential Los Angeles Dodgers president Walter O'Malley, under whom the minor league Montreal Royals had become affiliated with the Dodgers. On May 27, 1968, O'Malley announced that franchises were being awarded to Montreal and San Diego, beginning play the following year (1969).

Business executive Charles Bronfman of the Seagram's distilling empire owned the new team. With a long history of use in Montreal, the "Royals" was one of the candidate nicknames for the new franchise, but the American League's new Kansas City team adopted this name, so the new owners conducted a contest to name the team. Many names were suggested by Montrealers (including the "Voyageurs" and in a coincidental twist, the "Nationals" — now used by the team in its new home in Washington, D.C.) but there was a clear winner. At the time, the city was still basking in the glow of the recently completed Expo 67, the most popular World's Fair to date, and so the name "Expos" was used. The Expos name also had the advantage of being the same in both English and French, the city's two dominant languages.

=== San Diego Padres ===
The Padres adopted their name from the Pacific Coast League team which arrived in San Diego in 1936. That minor league franchise won the PCL title in 1937, led by then-18-year-old San Diego native Ted Williams. Their original owner was C. Arnholt Smith, a prominent San Diego businessman and former owner of the PCL Padres whose interests included banking, tuna fishing, hotels, real estate and an airline. The team was led by longtime baseball executive Buzzie Bavasi.

=== Kansas City Royals ===
The "Royals" name originates from the American Royal Livestock Show, held in Kansas City since 1899. Entering Major League Baseball as an expansion franchise in 1969, the club was founded by Ewing Kauffman, a Kansas City businessman. The franchise was established following the actions of Stuart Symington, then-United States Senator from Missouri, who demanded a new franchise for the city after the Athletics—Kansas City's previous major league team—moved to Oakland, California.

=== Seattle Pilots ===
Seattle initially had much going for it when it joined the American League in 1969. Seattle had long been a hotbed for minor league baseball and was home to the Seattle Rainiers, one of the pillars of the Pacific Coast League (PCL). The Cleveland Indians had almost moved to Seattle in 1965. Many of the same things that attracted the Indians made Seattle a plum choice for an expansion team. Seattle was the third-biggest metropolitan area on the West Coast (behind Los Angeles and San Francisco Bay Area).

== Draft results ==
Key
‡	All-Star
†	Member of the Baseball Hall of Fame

=== National League draft ===
Pick	Player	Selected from	Selected by
1	Ollie Brown	San Francisco Giants	San Diego Padres
2	Manny Mota^{‡}	Pittsburgh Pirates	Montreal Expos
3	Dave Giusti^{‡}^{[b]}	St. Louis Cardinals	San Diego Padres
4	Mack Jones	Cincinnati Reds	Montreal Expos
5	Dick Selma	New York Mets	San Diego Padres
6	John Bateman	Houston Astros	Montreal Expos
7	Al Santorini	Atlanta Braves	San Diego Padres
8	Gary Sutherland	Philadelphia Phillies	Montreal Expos
9	José Arcia	Chicago Cubs	San Diego Padres
10	Jack Billingham^{‡}^{[e]}	Los Angeles Dodgers	Montreal Expos
11	Donn Clendenon^{[e]}	Pittsburgh Pirates	Montreal Expos
12	Clay Kirby	St. Louis Cardinals	San Diego Padres
13	Jesús Alou^{[e]}	San Francisco Giants	Montreal Expos
14	Fred Kendall	Cincinnati Reds	San Diego Padres
15	Mike Wegener	Philadelphia Phillies	Montreal Expos
16	Jerry Morales^{‡}	New York Mets	San Diego Padres
17	Skip Guinn^{[e]}	Atlanta Braves	Montreal Expos
18	Nate Colbert^{‡}	Houston Astros	San Diego Padres
19	Bill Stoneman^{‡}	Chicago Cubs	Montreal Expos
20	Zoilo Versalles^{‡}	Los Angeles Dodgers	San Diego Padres
21	Maury Wills^{‡}	Pittsburgh Pirates	Montreal Expos
22	Frank Reberger	Chicago Cubs	San Diego Padres
23	Larry Jackson^{‡}^{[a]}	Philadelphia Phillies	Montreal Expos
24	Jerry DaVanon	St. Louis Cardinals	San Diego Padres
25	Bob Reynolds	San Francisco Giants	Montreal Expos
26	Larry Stahl	New York Mets	San Diego Padres
27	Dan McGinn	Cincinnati Reds	Montreal Expos
28	Dick Kelley	Atlanta Braves	San Diego Padres
29	José Herrera	Houston Astros	Montreal Expos
30	Al Ferrara	Los Angeles Dodgers	San Diego Padres
31	Mike Corkins	San Francisco Giants	San Diego Padres
32	Jimy Williams^{[h]}	Cincinnati Reds	Montreal Expos
33	Tom Dukes	Houston Astros	San Diego Padres
34	Remy Hermoso	Atlanta Braves	Montreal Expos
35	Rick James^{[i]}	Chicago Cubs	San Diego Padres
36	Mudcat Grant^{‡}	Los Angeles Dodgers	Montreal Expos
37	Tony González	Philadelphia Phillies	San Diego Padres
38	Jerry Robertson	St. Louis Cardinals	Montreal Expos
39	Dave Roberts	Pittsburgh Pirates	San Diego Padres
40	Don Shaw	New York Mets	Montreal Expos
41	Ty Cline	San Francisco Giants	Montreal Expos
42	Ivan Murrell	Houston Astros	San Diego Padres
43	Garry Jestadt	Chicago Cubs	Montreal Expos
44	Jim Williams	Los Angeles Dodgers	San Diego Padres
45	Carl Morton	Atlanta Braves	Montreal Expos
46	Billy McCool	Cincinnati Reds	San Diego Padres
47	Larry Jaster	St. Louis Cardinals	Montreal Expos
48	Roberto Peña	Philadelphia Phillies	San Diego Padres
49	Ernie McAnally	New York Mets	Montreal Expos
50	Al McBean	Pittsburgh Pirates	San Diego Padres
51	Rafael Robles	San Francisco Giants	San Diego Padres
52	Jim Fairey	Los Angeles Dodgers	Montreal Expos
53	Fred Katawczik^{[f]}	Cincinnati Reds	San Diego Padres
54	Coco Laboy	St. Louis Cardinals	Montreal Expos
55	Ron Slocum	Pittsburgh Pirates	San Diego Padres
56	John Boccabella	Chicago Cubs	Montreal Expos
57	Steve Arlin	Philadelphia Phillies	San Diego Padres
58	Ron Brand	Houston Astros	Montreal Expos
59	Cito Gaston^{‡}	Atlanta Braves	San Diego Padres
60	John Glass^{[f]}	New York Mets	Montreal Expos

=== American League draft ===
Pick	Player	Selected from	Selected by
1	Roger Nelson	Baltimore Orioles	Kansas City Royals
2	Don Mincher^{‡}	California Angels	Seattle Pilots
3	Tommy Harper^{‡}	Cleveland Indians	Seattle Pilots
4	Joe Foy	Boston Red Sox	Kansas City Royals
5	Ray Oyler	Detroit Tigers	Seattle Pilots
6	Jim Rooker	New York Yankees	Kansas City Royals
7	Jerry McNertney	Chicago White Sox	Seattle Pilots
8	Joe Keough	Oakland Athletics	Kansas City Royals
9	Buzz Stephen	Minnesota Twins	Seattle Pilots
10	Steve Jones	Washington Senators	Kansas City Royals
11	Chico Salmon	Cleveland Indians	Seattle Pilots
12	Jon Warden	Detroit Tigers	Kansas City Royals
13	Ellie Rodríguez^{‡}	New York Yankees	Kansas City Royals
14	Diego Seguí	Oakland Athletics	Seattle Pilots
15	Dave Morehead	Boston Red Sox	Kansas City Royals
16	Tommy Davis^{‡}	Chicago White Sox	Seattle Pilots
17	Mike Fiore	Baltimore Orioles	Kansas City Royals
18	Marty Pattin^{‡}	California Angels	Seattle Pilots
19	Bob Oliver	Minnesota Twins	Kansas City Royals
20	Gerry Schoen	Washington Senators	Seattle Pilots
21	Gary Bell^{‡}	Boston Red Sox	Seattle Pilots
22	Bill Butler	Detroit Tigers	Kansas City Royals
23	Steve Whitaker	New York Yankees	Kansas City Royals
24	Jack Aker	Oakland Athletics	Seattle Pilots
25	Wally Bunker	Baltimore Orioles	Kansas City Royals
26	Rich Rollins^{‡}	Minnesota Twins	Seattle Pilots
27	Paul Schaal	California Angels	Kansas City Royals
28	Lou Piniella^{‡}^{[d]}	Cleveland Indians	Seattle Pilots
29	Bill Haynes	Chicago White Sox	Kansas City Royals
30	Dick Bates	Washington Senators	Seattle Pilots
31	Dick Drago	Detroit Tigers	Kansas City Royals
32	Larry Haney	Baltimore Orioles	Seattle Pilots
33	Dick Baney	Boston Red Sox	Seattle Pilots
34	Pat Kelly^{‡}	Minnesota Twins	Kansas City Royals
35	Steve Hovley	California Angels	Seattle Pilots
36	Billy Harris	Cleveland Indians	Kansas City Royals
37	Steve Barber^{‡}	New York Yankees	Seattle Pilots
38	Don O'Riley	Oakland Athletics	Kansas City Royals
39	John Miklos^{[f]}	Washington Senators	Seattle Pilots
40	Al Fitzmorris	Chicago White Sox	Kansas City Royals
41	Wayne Comer	Detroit Tigers	Seattle Pilots
42	Moe Drabowsky	Baltimore Orioles	Kansas City Royals
43	Jackie Hernández	Minnesota Twins	Kansas City Royals
44	Bucky Brandon	Boston Red Sox	Seattle Pilots
45	Mike Hedlund	Cleveland Indians	Kansas City Royals
46	Skip Lockwood	Oakland Athletics	Seattle Pilots
47	Tom Burgmeier	California Angels	Kansas City Royals
48	Gary Timberlake	New York Yankees	Seattle Pilots
49	Hoyt Wilhelm^{†}^{[c]}	Chicago White Sox	Kansas City Royals
50	Bob Richmond^{[f]}	Washington Senators	Seattle Pilots
51	Jerry Adair	Boston Red Sox	Kansas City Royals
52	John Morris	Baltimore Orioles	Seattle Pilots
53	Mike Marshall^{‡}	Detroit Tigers	Seattle Pilots
54	Jerry Cram	Minnesota Twins	Kansas City Royals
55	Jim Gosger	Oakland Athletics	Seattle Pilots
56	Fran Healy	Cleveland Indians	Kansas City Royals
57	Mike Ferraro	New York Yankees	Seattle Pilots
58	Scott Northey	Chicago White Sox	Kansas City Royals
59	Paul Click^{[f]}	California Angels	Seattle Pilots
60	Ike Brookens^{[g]}	Washington Senators	Kansas City Royals

^{a} The Expos acquired Bobby Wine as compensation after Larry Jackson decided to retire rather than report to Montreal.

^{b} Dave Giusti never played for the Padres. He was traded back to the Cardinals two months later for four players.

^{c} Hoyt Wilhelm never played for the Royals. He was traded to the California Angels on December 12, 1968, for two players.

^{d} Lou Piniella never played for the Pilots. He was traded to the Royals on April 1, 1969.

^{e} Jesus Alou, Jack Billingham and Skip Guinn never played for the Expos. Alou and Donn Clendenon were traded to Houston for Rusty Staub. When Clendenon threatened to retire rather than report, Billingham and Guinn were sent to Houston to complete the trade.

^{f} Katawczik, Glass, Miklos, Richmond and Click never played in the major leagues.

^{g} Ike Brookens never played for the Royals. He did not play in the major leagues until making his debut with the Detroit Tigers in 1975.

^{g} Jimy Williams never played for the Expos or returned to the major leagues.

^{h} Rick James never played for the Padres or returned to the major leagues.

== See also ==
- Continental League, a proposed third major league that had planned to begin play in the 1961 season
