= Nate Colbert =

American baseball player (1946–2023)

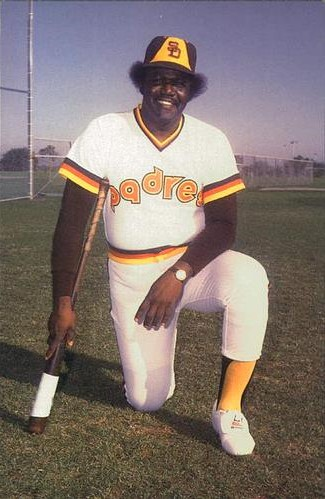
- Colbert as a coach with the San Diego Padres in 1983
- First baseman
- Born: April 9, 1946; St. Louis, Missouri, U.S.
- Died: January 5, 2023 (aged 76); Las Vegas, Nevada, U.S.
- Batted: Right Threw: Right

MLB debut
- April 14, 1966, for the Houston Astros

Last MLB appearance
- October 1, 1976, for the Oakland Athletics

MLB statistics
- Batting average: .243
- Home runs: 173
- Runs batted in: 520
- Stats at Baseball Reference

Teams
- Houston Astros (1966, 1968); San Diego Padres (1969–1974); Detroit Tigers (1975); Montreal Expos (1975–1976); Oakland Athletics (1976)

Career highlights and awards
- 3× All-Star (1971–1973); San Diego Padres Hall of Fame

Nathan Colbert Jr. (April 9, 1946 – January 5, 2023) was an American professional baseball player. He played in Major League Baseball (MLB) as a first baseman from 1966 to 1976, most prominently as a member of the newly formed San Diego Padres, who joined the league as an expansion team in 1969. He was among the inaugural inductees into the Padres Hall of Fame.

Colbert played six seasons with San Diego from 1969 to 1974, earning all three of his All-Star selections and becoming the first star player for the young franchise. He averaged 30 home runs and 85 RBIs over five seasons between 1969 and 1973. Colbert held the Padres' career record for home runs (163) until 2024, and ranks among the Padres' top 10 in numerous other offensive categories. He also played for the Houston Astros, Detroit Tigers, Montreal Expos, and the Oakland Athletics. A back injury prematurely ended his career after just 10 seasons.

After his playing career, Colbert spent several years as a hitting instructor for the Padres during spring training and later served as a hitting coach and manager in the minor leagues. He also became an ordained minister working with disadvantaged youths.

== Early life ==
Colbert was born on April 9, 1946, in St. Louis, Missouri. His father, Nate Sr., played semi-professional baseball as a catcher and occasional pitcher in the Negro leagues; he caught for Satchel Paige. When he was eight, Colbert attended a doubleheader at Busch Stadium (formerly Sportsman's Park) on May 2, 1954, in which Stan Musial of the St. Louis Cardinals set MLB single-day records with five home runs, starting with three homers in Game 1, and 21 total bases. Colbert graduated from Sumner High School, which was about a five-minute drive from Busch Stadium.

== Professional career ==
Colbert was signed by his hometown Cardinals as an amateur free agent in 1964. There was no MLB draft until 1965, allowing him to sign with the team of his choosing. He declined 16 major league bonus offers and 30 college scholarships to sign with St. Louis. He had always wanted to play for the same team as his boyhood hero, Musial. The Houston Astros selected Colbert in the Rule 5 draft in 1965, and he made his MLB debut with the Astros in 1966. He also played for the Astros in 1968 before being selected by the San Diego Padres in the 1968 expansion draft.

Throughout his career with the Padres from 1969 to 1974, he was a standout player and their biggest star as they finished in last place in the six-team National League (NL) West in each of their first six seasons, averaging 101 losses per season and concluding each year from 28 1/2 to 42 games behind the division leader. In 1969, the Padres' inaugural season and Colbert's first full season in the big leagues, San Diego began the season with Bill Davis at first base, and Colbert started only four of the first 15 games. However, Davis was traded midseason, and Colbert ended the season with a team-leading 24 home runs with 66 runs batted in (RBIs) and a .255 batting average. His home runs led all MLB rookies that season. He hit 38 home runs in 1970, tying him for fifth with Hank Aaron in the NL. The next year, Colbert was named to his first All-Star Game. He led the Padres in home runs (27) and RBIs (84), and improved his batting average for the third straight season, hitting .264 after batting .259 in 1970.

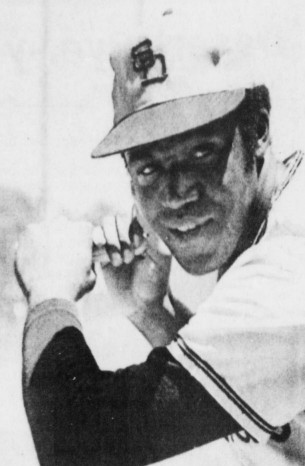
Colbert tied his career high with 38 home runs in 1972.

Colbert's best day in the majors was August 1, 1972, when he hit five home runs—matching Musial's record from 1954—and drove in 13 runs in a doubleheader, breaking the record of 11 RBIs, (Note: Mark Whiten of St. Louis tied Colbert with 13 RBIs in a doubleheader against the Cincinnati Reds in 1993.) set previously by Earl Averill (1930), Jim Tabor (1939), and Boog Powell (1966). Colbert's 22 total bases also broke another doubleheader record by Musial. This helped the Padres sweep the Atlanta Braves, 9–0 and 11–7. Colbert hit 38 homers in 1972, matching his total from 1970, and batted .250 with a .508 slugging percentage and 111 RBIs, helping him finish eighth in voting for the NL Most Valuable Player Award. He finished second only to the Cincinnati Reds' Johnny Bench (40) in home runs that year. Colbert's RBIs also set a major-league record for driving in the highest percentage of his team's runs (22.75%). None of his teammates had as many as 50 that year, as the team scored a league-worst 3.19 runs per game. He was selected to the 1972 MLB All-Star Game, and scored the winning run in the tenth inning. In 1973, he had career-highs in batting average (.270) and on-base percentage (.343), while dropping to 22 home runs and 80 RBIs. It was his final productive season. In the five seasons from 1969 to 1973, he averaged 30 home runs and 85 RBIs.

After three All-Star seasons at first base from 1971 to 1973, San Diego moved Colbert to left field after acquiring Willie McCovey in 1974. Colbert had agreed to the acquisition, and was also willing to move in the batting order from the cleanup position to fifth to accommodate McCovey. Colbert struggled that season, shuffling between left field and first base while dealing with nagging injuries. He began having problems with his back, suffering from a congenital condition caused by degeneration of his vertebrae. After his batting average fell to .207, the Padres traded Colbert to the Detroit Tigers for Ed Brinkman, Bob Strampe, and Dick Sharon in a three-team deal on November 18, 1974, that involved Brinkman also being sent to the St. Louis Cardinals for Sonny Siebert, Alan Foster, and Rich Folkers. Danny Breeden went from the Padres to the Cardinals to subsequently complete the transactions. After batting .147 with four home runs and 18 RBIs in 45 games, the Tigers sold Colbert's contract to the Montreal Expos on June 15, 1975. He spent much of 1976 in the minor leagues before resurfacing very briefly with the Oakland Athletics at the end of the season. He attended spring training with the expansion Toronto Blue Jays in 1977, but back problems forced his retirement at 30.

Colbert was the first star for the Padres and remained the franchise's career home run leader (163) until 2024, when it was broken by Manny Machado. Colbert also ranks among the top-10 in club history in RBIs (481), slugging percentage (.469), games played (866), runs scored (442) and base on balls (350). He was inducted as part of the inaugural class of the San Diego Padres Hall of Fame in 1999.

In 10 seasons covering 1,004 games, Colbert compiled a .243 average, 173 home runs, and 520 RBIs. He played on nine consecutive last-place teams from 1968 to 1976.

== Later life ==
After his playing career, Colbert spent several years as a hitting instructor for the Padres during spring training. He later coached for them in the minor leagues, serving as a hitting coach with the Wichita Pilots (AA) and a first base coach for the Riverside Red Wave (A) from 1987 to 1990. He also became an ordained minister after graduating from St. Louis Baptist College (now Missouri Baptist University), and worked with disadvantaged youths. In 1991, Colbert pled guilty to committing fraud on bank loan documents, and he served a six-month sentence at a medium-security penitentiary in Lompoc, California.

== Personal life ==
Colbert met his wife, Kasey, while playing with Oakland. They had nine children together.

He died on January 5, 2023, in Las Vegas, Nevada, at the age of 76.

== See also ==
- List of San Diego Padres team records
