= Dick Kelley =

American baseball player (1940-1991)

- Pitcher
- Born: January 8, 1940; Brighton, Massachusetts, U.S.
- Died: December 11, 1991 (aged 51); Northridge, California, U.S.
- Batted: Right Threw: Left

MLB debut
- April 15, 1964, for the Milwaukee Braves

Last MLB appearance
- September 28, 1971, for the San Diego Padres

MLB statistics
- Win–loss record: 18–30
- Earned run average: 3.39
- Strikeouts: 369
- Stats at Baseball Reference

Teams
- Milwaukee / Atlanta Braves (1964–1968); San Diego Padres (1969, 1971)

Richard Anthony Kelley (January 8, 1940 – December 11, 1991) was an American professional baseball player. A left-handed pitcher, Kelley's career extended for 14 seasons, and he spent all or parts of seven years in Major League Baseball as a member of the Milwaukee/Atlanta Braves and San Diego Padres.

The native of Brighton, Massachusetts, attended Saint Columbkille's High School. He stood 5 feet 11 inches (1.80 m) and weighed 174 pounds (79 kg) during his playing career. He pitched in 188 Major League games between 1964 and 1969 and in 1971, 61 as a starter. In 1969, as an original member of the San Diego Padres, acquired during the expansion draft, he started 23 games, fourth most on the club. Overall, Kelley won 18 of 48 decisions (.375) in MLB, with five shutouts and five saves and an earned-run average of 3.39. He had a 69–45 (.605) record in minor league baseball, including a stellar 11–2 mark and 2.16 ERA in 14 starts in the Triple-A International League in 1965.

Kelley retired as an active player after the 1972 season, and died in Northridge, California, at the age of 51.
