= John Sipin =

American baseball player (born 1946)

- Second baseman
- Born: August 29, 1946 (age 80); Watsonville, California, U.S.
- Batted: Right Threw: Right

Professional debut
- MLB: May 24, 1969, for the San Diego Padres
- NPB: April 11, 1972, for the Taiyo Whales

Last appearance
- MLB: August 27, 1969, for the San Diego Padres
- NPB: October 20, 1980, for the Yomiuri Giants

MLB statistics
- Batting average: .223
- Home runs: 2
- Runs batted in: 9

NPB statistics
- Batting average: .297
- Home runs: 218
- Runs batted in: 625
- Stats at Baseball Reference

Teams
- San Diego Padres (1969); Taiyo Whales (1972–1977); Yomiuri Giants (1978–1980)

Career highlights and awards
- Japanese Central League All-Star x5 (1972–74, 1977, 1979); Best Nine Award x2 (1972–73); Japanese Gold Glove x2 (1972–73)

John White Sipin (born August 29, 1946) is an American former professional baseball second baseman. He played one season in Major League Baseball (MLB) for the San Diego Padres. He also played nine seasons in Nippon Professional Baseball (NPB) with the Taiyo Whales and Yomiuri Giants.

== Personal life ==
John Sipin was born in Watsonville, California and is the son of Johnny Imperial Sipin, a Filipino of Ilocano origin and Ethel White, a native from Little Rock, Arkansas. John grew up in Watsonville and went to Watsonville High School where his baseball jersey was retired in 2006. John is currently married to Gizelle Sipin (a local of Soquel, California) and together they have two daughters Alisha and Kamala.

== Youth career ==
Sipin played for the men's softball team of the Ilocos Region (Region I) in the Palarong Pambansa, the national student's games of the Philippines, in the 1970s. Sipin's team dominated the games and were known as the "Marcos Boys" since the regional softball program was supported by the Marcos family.

== Professional career ==
=== St. Louis Cardinals ===
Sipin was selected by the St. Louis Cardinals in the 55th round of the 1965 amateur draft. He played four seasons in the Cardinals' minor league system, rising as high as the Triple-A Tulsa Oilers, with whom he opened the 1969 season. He was traded to the San Diego Padres on May 22, 1969, with Sonny Ruberto for the Padres' Jerry DaVanon and Bill Davis.

=== San Diego Padres ===
Following the trade, Sipin was promoted to the major leagues. Sipin played 68 games for the Padres that season, batting .223 with 12 doubles, two triples and two homers in 229 at bats. He also had 9 RBIs and 2 stolen bases that season. Sipin had 7 errors in the field, giving him a fielding percentage of 0.976 for 477 innings.

An interesting quirk to Sipin's major league career was that he hit a triple in each of his first two big league at bats, but never collected another three-base hit in the majors. On May 24, 1969, Sipin hit triples in the first and fourth innings off pitcher Ken Holtzman of the Chicago Cubs.

Following the 1969 season, Sipin returned to the minor leagues. He played the next two seasons with the Padres' top farm team, 1970 for the Salt Lake City Bees and 1971 for the Hawaii Islanders. Each year, he hit over .300 with exactly 20 home runs. However, he never got another shot at the major leagues.

=== Nippon Professional Baseball ===
Sipin signed with the Taiyo Whales (current Yokohama BayStars) in 1972, and instantly became one of the best second basemen in Japanese baseball during the 1970s. He played his best season in 1975, hitting 34 home runs and 82 RBIs, with a .295 batting average. He also won the Japanese golden glove award, being the first foreigner to be awarded the Golden Glove, in 1972 and 1973.

He was traded to the Yomiuri Giants in 1978, and hit over .300 each of his seasons with the Giants, often playing in the outfield instead of second base. He retired in 1980, after missing half of the season with an injury.

Sipin gained popularity in Japan, and his hair and beard gave him the nickname, Lion Maru (after the character in the children's television series Kaiketsu Lion-Maru). He was entertaining on and off the field, making entrances with extravagant outfits, or fielding ground balls with his batting helmet on. He changed his appearance when he joined the Yomiuri Giants, shaving off his long hair and beard to adopt a gentleman-like look (similarly, Michihiro Ogasawara shaved off his trademark beard when he joined the Giants.

In 1978, he charged at the mound after being hit by a pitch two times during the season, and was ejected both times after beating up the opposing pitcher. He had been ejected once with the Whales, but only for kicking sand onto the home plate after a disputed call.

== Sources ==
- The editors of the Sporting News (1992). Baseball A Doubleheader Collection of Facts, Feats, & Firsts. St. Louis, Mo.: The Sporting News Publishing Co. ISBN 0-88365-785-6..
