= Al Severinsen =

American baseball player (1944–2015)

- Pitcher
- Born: November 9, 1944; Brooklyn, New York, U.S.
- Died: January 27, 2015 (aged 70); Mystic, Connecticut, U.S.
- Batted: Right Threw: Right

MLB debut
- July 1, 1969, for the Baltimore Orioles

Last MLB appearance
- September 14, 1972, for the San Diego Padres

MLB statistics
- Win–loss record: 3–7
- Earned run average: 3.08
- Strikeouts: 53
- Stats at Baseball Reference

Teams
- Baltimore Orioles (1969); San Diego Padres (1971–1972)

Albert Henry Severinsen (November 9, 1944 – January 27, 2015) was an American Major League Baseball pitcher who played in 1969 with the Baltimore Orioles and in 1971 and 1972 with the San Diego Padres. He batted and threw right-handed. Severinsen had a 3–7 record, with a 3.08 ERA, in 88 games, in his three-year career. He was signed by the Chicago Cubs as an amateur free agent in 1963. He attended Wagner College. He was traded along with Enzo Hernández, Tom Phoebus and Fred Beene from the defending World Series Champion Orioles to the Padres for Pat Dobson and Tom Dukes on December 1, 1970. He was assigned to the Tidewater Tides after being dealt to the New York Mets for Dave Marshall exactly two years later on December 1, 1972.

Severinsen died January 27, 2015, at his home in Mystic, Connecticut.
