= Chris Cannizzaro =

American baseball player (1938–2016)

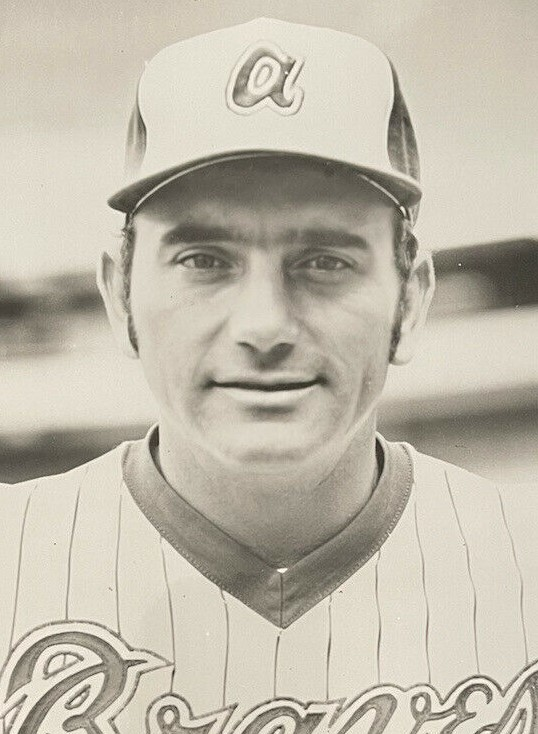
- Catcher
- Born: May 3, 1938; Oakland, California, U.S.
- Died: December 29, 2016 (aged 78); San Diego, California, U.S.
- Batted: Right Threw: Right

MLB debut
- April 17, 1960, for the St. Louis Cardinals

Last MLB appearance
- September 28, 1974, for the San Diego Padres

MLB statistics
- Batting average: .235
- Home runs: 18
- Runs batted in: 169
- Stats at Baseball Reference

Teams
- As player: St. Louis Cardinals (1960–1961); New York Mets (1962–1965); Pittsburgh Pirates (1968); San Diego Padres (1969–1971); Chicago Cubs (1971); Los Angeles Dodgers (1972–1973); San Diego Padres (1974); As coach: Atlanta Braves (1976–1978)

Career highlights and awards
- All-Star (1969)

Christopher John Cannizzaro (May 3, 1938 – December 29, 2016) was an American professional baseball player and coach. He played as a catcher in Major League Baseball (MLB) from 1960 to 1974 for the St. Louis Cardinals (1960–61), New York Mets (1962–65), Pittsburgh Pirates (1968), San Diego Padres (1969–71, 1974), Chicago Cubs (1971), and Los Angeles Dodgers (1972–73).

== Playing career ==
Cannizzaro was born in Oakland, California and attended San Leandro High School. He was signed by the St. Louis Cardinals as an amateur free agent on June 21, 1956. After playing in the minor leagues for four seasons, he made his major league debut with the Cardinals at the age of 21 on April 17, 1960.

On October 10, 1961, he was drafted by the New York Mets from the Cardinals as the 26th pick in the 1961 Major League Baseball expansion draft. He appeared in 59 games for the 1962 Mets expansion team, which ended up with a record of 40–120. The 120 losses was the most by any Major League Baseball team in a single season since the 19th century, not surpassed until the Chicago White Sox lost 121 in 2024.

Cannizzaro had his most productive years while with the San Diego Padres. In 1969 he appeared in a career-high 134 games and became the first San Diego Padre selected to play in the Major League Baseball All-Star Game. In 1970, he posted career-highs with a .279 batting average, 5 home runs and 42 runs batted in.

The Padres traded Cannizzaro on May 19, 1971 to the Chicago Cubs for Garry Jestadt. He became the Cubs regular catcher after Randy Hundley was forced to sit out the season due to an injury. On December 17, 1971, Cannizzaro was selected off waivers from the Cubs by the Los Angeles Dodgers. He did the majority of the catching for the Dodgers in 1972 as the team finished in second place in the National League. He played in his final major league game on September 28, 1974 at the age of 36.

== Career statistics ==
In a thirteen-year major league career, Cannizzaro played in 740 games, accumulating 458 hits in 1,950 at bats for a .235 career batting average, along with 18 home runs, 169 runs batted in and an on-base percentage of .319. He had a career fielding percentage of .983.

== Coaching career ==
Cannizzaro served as the bullpen coach of the Atlanta Braves from 1976 to 1978.

== Death ==
Cannizzaro died from emphysema on December 29, 2016, at the age of 78.

== Highlights ==
- 1969 National League All-Star
- Was an original member of the 1962 New York Mets
- Was an original member of the 1969 San Diego Padres
