= Frankie Librán =

Puerto Rican baseball player (1948–2013)

Francisco Librán
- Shortstop
- Born: May 6, 1948; Mayagüez, Puerto Rico
- Died: May 16, 2013 (aged 65); Mayagüez, Puerto Rico
- Batted: Right Threw: Right

MLB debut
- September 3, 1969, for the San Diego Padres

Last MLB appearance
- September 28, 1969, for the San Diego Padres

MLB statistics
- Batting average: .100
- Home runs: 0
- Runs batted in: 1
- Stats at Baseball Reference

Teams
- San Diego Padres (1969)

Francisco Librán Rosas (May 6, 1948 – May 16, 2013) was a Puerto Rican athlete who distinguished himself for performing professionally on all three major sports in the island (baseball, basketball, volleyball). Most notably, Librán played as an infielder in Major League Baseball during the late 60s. He batted and threw right-handed, and was listed at 6 ft (1.8 m) tall and 168 lb (76 kg). Librán also practiced track and field, and softball. Because of his versatility, he is usually referred to as "the most complete Puerto Rican athlete". He is survived by his two daughters Yeidie J. Librán and Yara E. Librán.

== Early life and education ==
Librán was born in 1948 in Mayagüez, and was raised at the Franklin D. Roosevelt housing project. He started practicing sports when he was 10 years old. Librán studied at the Interamerican University of Puerto Rico, where he competed for the Liga Atlética Interuniversitaria de Puerto Rico.

== Sports career ==
During his career as an athlete, Librán distinguished himself for practicing several sports. He played for the Vaqueros de Bayamón of the Puerto Rico volleyball league, and in 1965 played for the Atléticos de San Germán of the Baloncesto Superior Nacional. He also practiced track and field and high jump.

However, Librán became more known for his career as a baseball player. Although he played mostly as a shortstop, he could also play second and third base. In 1965, while also playing basketball, Librán helped the Patrulleros de San Sebastián of the Doble A Baseball League in Puerto Rico to win the championship. He also played with San Juan, Arecibo, and Caguas in the Puerto Rico Professional Baseball League.

In 1968, Librán was signed by the Chicago Cubs of the Major League Baseball, and spent that season split between two Class A Cub affiliates. While a member of the Cubs' Double-A San Antonio Missions team, he was traded along with Joe Niekro and Gary Ross to the expansion San Diego Padres for Dick Selma on April 24, 1969. He remained with the Missions all season and was added to the San Diego roster after September 1.

Librán made his Major League debut as a shortstop in the 1969 season. In his debut game, Librán went hitless in two at bats against Woodie Fryman of the Philadelphia Phillies. Thirteen days later, he collected his only major league hit, an RBI-double off Tom Griffin of the Houston Astros. Librán played in ten games as a Major Leaguer.

After suffering a knee injury, Librán was sent to the minor leagues, where he played for two more years. He left the game after the 1971 campaign. Despite this injury, Librán continued to play in Puerto Rico for teams like Senadores de San Juan, Lobos de Arecibo, Criollos de Caguas, and Indios de Mayagüez.

After retiring from baseball, Librán played softball for Mayagüez from 1977 to 1987.

== Later years and death ==
After retiring from sports, Librán completed his college studies in education, and worked for 23 years for the Puerto Rico Department of Housing in Mayagüez.

Librán died on May 16, 2013, due to complications from surgery as a result of his condition of diabetes. His body was exposed at Martell Funeral Home in Mayagüez, and buried at Vivaldi Cemetery in Mayagüez. Francisco Librán is survived by his two daughters Yeidie J. Librán and Yara E. Librán.

== See also ==
- List of Major League Baseball players from Puerto Rico
