= Leon Everitt =

American baseball player (1947-2016)

- Pitcher
- Born: January 12, 1947; Marshall, Texas, U.S.
- Died: August 27, 2016 (aged 69); Marshall, Texas, U.S.
- Batted: Left Threw: Right

MLB debut
- April 21, 1969, for the San Diego Padres

Last MLB appearance
- May 13, 1969, for the San Diego Padres

MLB statistics
- Win–loss record: 0–1
- Earned run average: 8.04
- Strikeouts Walks: 11; 12
- Innings pitched: 15 2/3
- Stats at Baseball Reference

Teams
- San Diego Padres (1969)

Edward Leon Everitt (January 12, 1947 – August 27, 2016) was an American pitcher in Major League Baseball who made five relief appearances for the San Diego Padres during their inaugural 1969 season. Listed at 6' 1", 195 lb., he batted left handed and threw right handed.

Born in Marshall, Texas, Everitt was selected originally by the Los Angeles Dodgers in the 15th round of the 1965 MLB draft. He spent four seasons in the Dodgers Minor League Baseball system from 1965 to 1968, before joining the Padres organization in 1969. He went 0-1 with an 8.04 earned run average for San Diego.

Besides, Everitt posted a 44-31 record with a 3.31 ERA in 108 minor league games, including 89 starts, 41 complete games and eight shutouts, striking out 595 batters while walking 305 in 663 innings of work.

After his baseball career, Everitt worked as a taxi driver, insurance salesman and in the construction industry in his homeland of Marshall, Texas, where he died in 2016 at the age of 69.
