= Ray Webster (first baseman) =

Panamanian baseball player (born 1942)

Ramón Webster
- First baseman / Outfielder
- Born: August 31, 1942 (age 83); Colón, Panama
- Batted: Left Threw: Left

MLB debut
- April 11, 1967, for the Kansas City Athletics

Last MLB appearance
- August 22, 1971, for the Chicago Cubs

MLB statistics
- Batting average: .244
- Home runs: 17
- Runs batted in: 98
- Stats at Baseball Reference

Teams
- Kansas City / Oakland Athletics (1967–1969); San Diego Padres (1970–1971); Oakland Athletics (1971); Chicago Cubs (1971)

Ramón Alberto Webster (born August 31, 1942) is a Panamanian former professional baseball first baseman. He played in Major League Baseball for the Kansas City / Oakland Athletics, San Diego Padres, and Chicago Cubs.

Webster came on strong in his rookie season for the Athletics, and handily won the starting first base job over Ken Harrelson after hit .256 with 11 home runs and 51 RBI in 360 at-bats. Since the 1968 Opening Day, Webster batted cleanup in the order behind Bert Campaneris, Reggie Jackson and Sal Bando. A leg injury suffered in early May limited his playing time for the rest of the season, dropping off to .214 with three homers and 23 RBI in 66 games, and never recovered his previous form. Eventually, he finished his career as a left-handed pinch-hitter producing unsatisfactory results.

In a five-season career, Webster was a .244 hitter (190-for-778) with 17 home runs and 98 RBI in 380 games, including 76 runs, 31 doubles, six triples, and nine stolen bases.

Webster managed the Panama national baseball team at the 1981 Bolivarian Games, held in Barquisimeto, Venezuela. Panama tied for first place with Venezuela in wins and losses, with both teams earning the gold medal.

== See also ==
- Players from Panama in Major League Baseball
