= Dick Selma =

American baseball player (1943–2001)

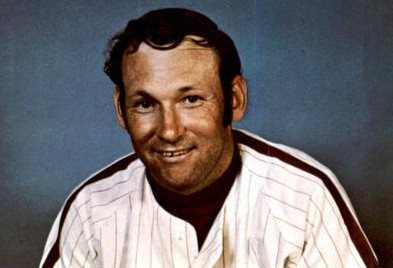
- Selma with the Philadelphia Phillies, circa 1972
- Pitcher
- Born: November 4, 1943; Santa Ana, California, U.S.
- Died: August 29, 2001 (aged 57); Clovis, California, U.S.
- Batted: Right Threw: Right

MLB debut
- September 2, 1965, for the New York Mets

Last MLB appearance
- August 9, 1974, for the Milwaukee Brewers

MLB statistics
- Win–loss record: 42–54
- Earned run average: 3.62
- Strikeouts: 681
- Stats at Baseball Reference

Teams
- New York Mets (1965–1968); San Diego Padres (1969); Chicago Cubs (1969); Philadelphia Phillies (1970–1973); California Angels (1974); Milwaukee Brewers (1974)

Career highlights and awards
- Won San Diego Padres' first game (1969)

Richard Jay Selma (November 4, 1943 – August 29, 2001) was an American professional baseball player who was a pitcher in the Major Leagues from 1965 to 1974. He played for the New York Mets, Chicago Cubs, San Diego Padres, Philadelphia Phillies, California Angels, and Milwaukee Brewers during his 10-year major league career.

== College and minor league career ==
Selma attended Fresno High School and played college baseball at Fresno City College. After a year, Selma was signed as an amateur free agent by the Mets on May 28, 1963, and made his Major League debut two seasons later.

== Major league career ==
In only his second career start, he threw a 10-inning shutout in a 1–0 victory against the Milwaukee Braves, accumulating 13 strikeouts in the process. The 13 strikeouts were at the time a Mets franchise record. He had two wins and one loss in four games that season, and spent the next two seasons with the Mets as a relief pitcher. During the 1968 season, Selma again became a starting pitcher and started 23 games, posting a 9–10 record with an ERA of 2.76. This, along with his 117 strikeouts, led the expansion San Diego Padres to draft him with the fifth pick in the 1968 expansion draft on October 14, 1968.

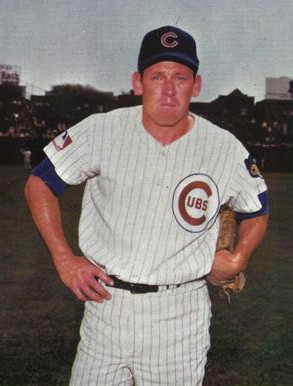
Selma in 1969 with the Chicago Cubs.

Selma was given the start for the Padres on opening day of the 1969 season. On April 8, 1969, Selma pitched a complete game and threw 12 strikeouts en route to a 2–1 victory, the Padres' first in franchise history. Selma ended up pitching only four games for the Padres, as he was traded to the Chicago Cubs for Joe Niekro, Gary Ross and Frankie Librán on April 24, 1969. It was during his time with the Cubs that Selma became known as a cheerleader for those sitting in Wrigley Field's bleachers. He finished his tenure with the Cubs with a 10–8 record, 161 strikeouts, and a 3.63 ERA. However, he had a 7–1 record before finishing 10–8, and partially as a result of this skid was traded. Selma was traded to the Philadelphia Phillies on November 17, 1969, with Oscar Gamble for a player to be named later (who became Larry Colton) and Johnny Callison.

The Phillies turned Selma into their closer for the 1970 season. He converted 22 saves in 73 appearances, and his 73 games pitched and 47 games finished were both second highest in the National League. He started 10 games in the 1972 season, but in his four seasons in Philadelphia, Selma was primarily used as a reliever. He was released by the Phillies on May 8, 1973, but was signed by the St. Louis Cardinals on May 21. He never appeared in a game for the Cardinals, and at the end of the season his contract was purchased by the California Angels. He played 18 games for the Angels during the 1974 season, his contract was purchased by the Milwaukee Brewers, whom he only played two games with. Selma was returned to the Angels after the two appearances, and did not appear in a major league game again.

After retiring from the game, Selma returned to Fresno and took a night job so that he could play and coach baseball in the area. He was an assistant coach at his alma mater and served as the pitching coach at Clovis High School. Selma died on August 29, 2001, in Clovis, California, as a result of liver cancer.
