= Van Kelly =

American baseball player

- Third baseman
- Born: March 18, 1946 (age 79); Charlotte, North Carolina, U.S.
- Batted: Left Threw: Right

MLB debut
- June 13, 1969, for the San Diego Padres

Last MLB appearance
- June 12, 1970, for the San Diego Padres

MLB statistics
- Batting average: .221
- Home runs: 4
- Runs batted in: 24
- Stats at Baseball Reference

Teams
- San Diego Padres (1969–1970)

Van Howard Kelly (born March 18, 1946) is a former Major League Baseball player. He played for the San Diego Padres of the National League. Kelly only played in the 1969 and 1970 baseball seasons. In 111 games over two years, Kelly had 66 hits in 298 at-bats. He also hit 4 home runs and had a .221 batting average. Kelly was also the manager of the 1975 Lethbridge Expos of the Pioneer Baseball League.
