= Jim Williams (outfielder, born 1947) =

American baseball player

- Outfielder
- Born: April 29, 1947 (age 78); Zachary, Louisiana, U.S.
- Batted: Right Threw: Right

MLB debut
- September 8, 1969, for the San Diego Padres

Last MLB appearance
- September 30, 1970, for the San Diego Padres

MLB statistics
- Batting average: .282
- Home runs: 0
- Runs batted in: 2
- Hits: 11
- Runs: 8
- Stats at Baseball Reference

Teams
- San Diego Padres (1969–1970)

James Alfred Williams (born April 29, 1947) is an American former professional baseball outfielder who played for the San Diego Padres during the franchise's first two seasons. He batted and threw right-handed.

== Career ==
Williams attended Harry Ells High School in Richmond, California. He was drafted by the Chicago Cubs in the 20th round of the 1965 amateur draft. His career with Chicago peaked at the Class A level. Following the 1967 season he was traded along with Paul Popovich to the Los Angeles Dodgers for Lou Johnson, where he played at the Class A and Class AA levels.

He was then drafted by the Padres during the 1968 expansion draft. The Padres assigned him to the Class AA Elmira Pioneers for the 1969 season and called him up to the major league team that September, where he appeared in 13 games. He was sent back to the minor leagues the following season, and spent most of the season playing for the Class AAA Salt Lake Bees before being called back up to San Diego in September, appearing in another 11 games.

Williams then spent part of 1971 playing for the Class A Lodi Padres and the rest of 1971 and all of 1972 in the Mexican League. He returned to the Padres minor-league system in 1973, playing for the Double-A Alexandria Aces before retiring at age 26.
