= Larry Stahl =

American baseball player (1941–2026)

- Outfielder
- Born: June 29, 1941; Belleville, Illinois, U.S.
- Died: March 17, 2026 (aged 84); Caseyville, Illinois, U.S.
- Batted: Left Threw: Left

MLB debut
- September 11, 1964, for the Kansas City Athletics

Last MLB appearance
- October 10, 1973, for the Cincinnati Reds

MLB statistics
- Batting average: .232
- Home runs: 36
- Runs batted in: 163
- Stats at Baseball Reference

Teams
- Kansas City Athletics (1964–1966); New York Mets (1967–1968); San Diego Padres (1969–1972); Cincinnati Reds (1973)

Larry Floyd Stahl (June 29, 1941 – March 17, 2026) was an American professional baseball outfielder. He played in Major League Baseball from 1964 to 1973 for the Kansas City Athletics, New York Mets, San Diego Padres, and Cincinnati Reds.

== Professional Career ==
Stahl was signed by the Athletics in 1960 as an amateur free agent. He broke into the big leagues on September 11, 1964, going 0-1 as a pinch-hitter against Wally Bunker in a 5-2 Kansas City loss to the Baltimore Orioles in Memorial Stadium. After brief appearances in several more games, he notched his first career hit on September 19 at Yankee Stadium in an 8–3 loss to the New York Yankees. Pinch-hitting for pitcher Orlando Peña in the sixth inning, he hit a ground-rule double off Ralph Terry.

During the 1966 season with Kansas City, Stahl slugged an estimated 503-foot home run, the longest diner in the history of Municipal Stadium. Stahl was waived by the Athletics after the 1967 and claimed by the New York Mets. Following a season in New York, Stahl was selected by the Padres in the 1968 expansion draft.

Primarily a pinch hitter and outfielder with San Diego, Stahl had his best year in 1971 when in 114 games for the Padres, he hit .253 with eight home runs and 36 runs batted in.

Stahl's most infamous at-bat came with Padres on September 2, 1972, against the Chicago Cubs at Wrigley Field, when he drew one of the most questionable bases on balls in baseball history — if only because of the circumstances surrounding it. Cubs pitcher Milt Pappas had retired the first 26 Padres hitters and was one strike away from a perfect game with a 2-2 count against pinch-hitter Stahl. However, home plate umpire Bruce Froemming called the next two pitches, both of which were close, balls. To date, the perfect game bid is the only one in Major League history to be broken up by a walk to the 27th batter. Pappas secured his no-hitter by retiring Garry Jestadt one batter later.

Stahl's contract was purchased by the Reds on December 1, 1972. Stahl spent the season as the Reds top pinch hitter, as Cincinnati won the National League West. In the 1973 National League Championship Series, pinch hit four times, collecting two hits, including a ninth-inning single off Mets' ace Tom Seaver in Game 5. It would prove to be his last Major League hit.

Stahl spent the 1974 season playing for the San Francisco Giants' Triple A affiliate and then retired from professional baseball.

== Personal Life and death ==
Following baseball, Stahl worked as an operator the Columbia Quarry, a coal mining company, and owned the Centerfield Tavern in his hometown of Belleville, Illinois. He also served on the Kaskaskia Regional Port District Board.

Stahl died at Caseyville Nursing and Rehabilitation Center, Caseyville, Illinois, on March 17, 2026, at the age of 84.
