= Mike Corkins =

American baseball player (1946–2023)

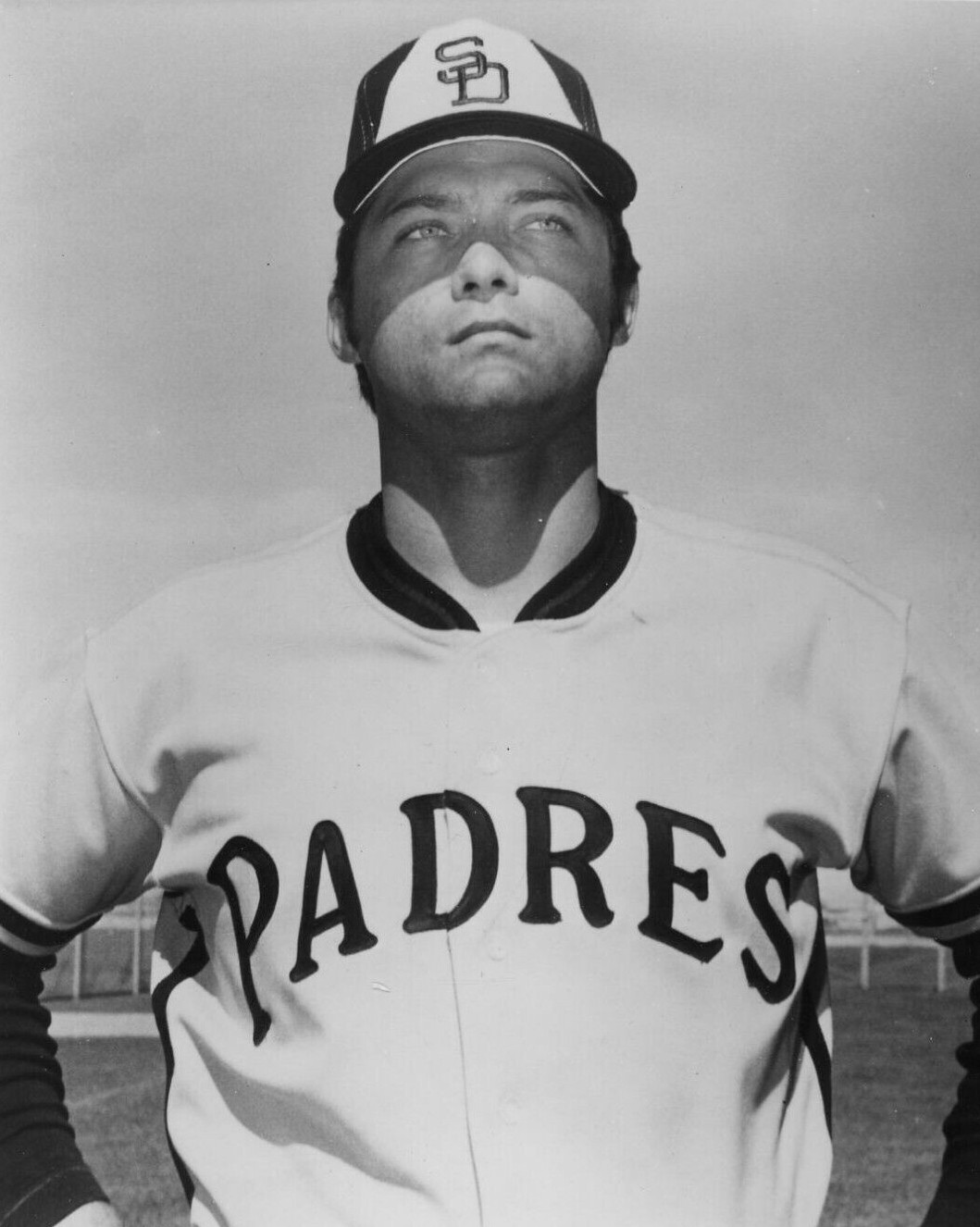
- Pitcher
- Born: May 25, 1946; Riverside, California, U.S.
- Died: November 27, 2023 (aged 77); Lake Havasu City, Arizona, U.S.
- Batted: Right Threw: Right

MLB debut
- September 8, 1969, for the San Diego Padres

Last MLB appearance
- July 14, 1974, for the San Diego Padres

MLB statistics
- Win–loss record: 19–28
- Earned run average: 4.39
- Strikeouts: 335
- Stats at Baseball Reference

Teams
- San Diego Padres (1969–1974)

Michael Patrick Corkins (May 25, 1946 – November 27, 2023) was an American Major League Baseball pitcher. The right-hander was signed by the San Francisco Giants as an amateur free agent before the 1965 season, and later drafted by the San Diego Padres from the Giants as the 31st pick in the 1968 MLB expansion draft. He played for the Padres from 1969 to 1974.

On September 22, 1969, Corkins gave up Willie Mays's 600th home run.

The majority of his 157 appearances was as a relief pitcher, but he did start 44 games. During his career, Corkins gave up 248 walks in just 459 1/3 innings pitched, for a BB/9IP of 4.86, much higher than the National League average at that time. However, with 335 strikeouts, his K/9IP was 6.56, which was higher than the National League average. Corkins wielded a strong bat (for a pitcher), hitting 5 home runs with a batting average of .202 in 119 lifetime at bats.

Corkins finished his career with a total of 19 wins, 28 losses, 9 saves, 48 games finished, and an ERA of 4.39. His 459.1 innings pitched and 157 games pitched are the most of any pitcher to exclusively play for the Padres during their career.

Corkins' major league debut with San Diego was mentioned in pitcher Jim Bouton's 1969 book, Ball Four. The book cites infielder Marty Martínez as yelling "Welcome to the National League, kid." from the Houston Astros dugout during Corkins' poor performance (a 9–2 loss).

Corkins died in Lake Havasu City, Arizona, at the age of 77.
