= Whitey Wietelmann =

American baseball player (1919–2002)

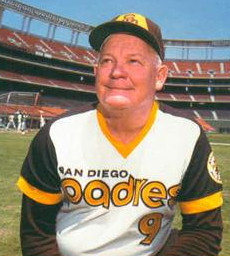
- Wietelmann in 1978
- Infielder
- Born: March 15, 1919; Zanesville, Ohio, U.S.
- Died: March 26, 2002 (aged 83); San Diego, California, U.S.
- Batted: Switch Threw: Right

MLB debut
- September 6, 1939, for the Boston Bees

Last MLB appearance
- September 18, 1947, for the Pittsburgh Pirates

MLB statistics
- Batting average: .232
- Home runs: 7
- Runs batted in: 122
- Stats at Baseball Reference

Teams
- Boston Bees/Braves (1939–1946); Pittsburgh Pirates (1947)

William Frederick "Whitey" Wietelmann (March 15, 1919 – March 26, 2002) was an American professional baseball player, coach and manager. He was an infielder in the Major Leagues from 1939–47 for the Boston Braves and Pittsburgh Pirates. The native of Zanesville, Ohio, stood 6 feet (1.8 m) tall and weighed 170 pounds (77 kg) during his active career. He was a switch-hitter who threw right-handed.

Wietelmann's playing career lasted for two decades, from 1937 to 1956. He broke in with the Braves in September 1939 when they were still nicknamed the "Bees", a temporary name change for the franchise begun in 1936 and abandoned after the 1940 season. He was the Braves' regular shortstop during the wartime 1943–44 seasons, and their regular second baseman during the final wartime season, 1945, when he hit a career-high .271. In September 1946, he was sent to the Pirates in one of the most important trades in Boston Braves history. In the multi-player transaction, Boston acquired third baseman Bob Elliott, who would win the 1947 National League Most Valuable Player Award and lead Boston to the 1948 NL championship.

After one season with Pittsburgh, Wietelmann was sent to the minor leagues. During his nine-season big league career, he collected 409 hits in 580 games played, with 55 doubles, six triples and seven home runs.

He was also an MLB coach for the Cincinnati Reds (1966–67) and San Diego Padres (1969–79) for 13 seasons, after ten seasons as a minor league coach in the Pacific Coast League, including nine years of service with the PCL Padres.

Whitey Wietelmann died in San Diego at the age of 83.
