= Tommy Dean =

American baseball player (born 1945)

- Shortstop
- Born: August 30, 1945 (age 80); Iuka, Mississippi, U.S.
- Batted: Right Threw: Right

MLB debut
- September 17, 1967, for the Los Angeles Dodgers

Last MLB appearance
- September 30, 1971, for the San Diego Padres

MLB statistics
- Batting average: .180
- Home runs: 4
- Runs batted in: 25
- Stats at Baseball Reference

Teams
- Los Angeles Dodgers (1967); San Diego Padres (1969–1971)

Tommy Douglas Dean (born August 30, 1945) is an American former professional baseball player. A shortstop, his career extended from 1964–71 and included 215 games played in Major League Baseball over four seasons (1967; 1969–71). Dean was listed at 6 feet (1.8 m) tall and 165 pounds (75 kg), and threw and batted right-handed.

== Career ==
Dean was signed out of Iuka (MS) High School for a $60,000 bonus in 1964 as an undrafted free agent by Los Angeles Dodgers general manager Buzzie Bavasi, who was trying to transform the Dodgers into a team built around pitching, speed and defense and considered Dean a top young prospect. However, Dean only appeared in 12 games with the Dodgers during the 1967 season. After spending 1968 in the minors, Dean was acquired by Bavasi's new expansion team, the San Diego Padres, nine days into the Padres' 1969 maiden season. He was the Padres' most-used shortstop that year, starting in 81 of the club's 162 games.

Dean spent three seasons with the Padres, playing his last game in 1971. All told, he batted only .180 in 529 big-league at bats. His 95 hits included 15 doubles, three triples and four home runs.
