= José Arcia =

Cuban baseball player (1943–2016)

- Infielder
- Born: August 22, 1943; Havana, Cuba
- Died: July 31, 2016 (aged 72); Miami, Florida, U.S.
- Batted: Right Threw: Right

MLB debut
- April 10, 1968, for the Chicago Cubs

Last MLB appearance
- September 30, 1970, for the San Diego Padres

MLB statistics
- Batting average: .215
- Home runs: 1
- Runs batted in: 35
- Stats at Baseball Reference

Teams
- Chicago Cubs (1968); San Diego Padres (1969–70)

José Raimundo Arcia Orta (August 22, 1943 - July 31, 2016) was a Cuban utility infielder in Major League Baseball who played from 1968 to 1970 for the Chicago Cubs and San Diego Padres. Arcia was signed as an amateur free agent by the Houston Colt .45s in 1962 but would not make his major league debut for six years.

In 1967's Rule 5 draft, the Cubs selected Arcia from the Cardinals organization. He opened the 1968 season as a member of the Cubs and remained with the club the whole season, batting .190 in 58 games as a rookie, hitting his only Major League home run, and playing six positions in the field. Arcia was selected by the Padres in the 1968 MLB expansion draft.

Arcia saw considerable playing time over the next two seasons with San Diego, serving as a rather versatile utility man. The only positions he did not play in his career were catcher and pitcher. His poor offense continued, however, as he hit .215 and .223 in 1969 and 1970 respectively, with singles accounting for 90 of his 116 hits. He also proved to be an unreliable baserunner, caught stealing in 13 of his 30 attempts those two years, though he did lead the Padres with 14 stolen bases in 1969.

Arcia's last game as a big leaguer was September 30, 1970.
