= Fred Kendall =

American baseball catcher (born 1949)

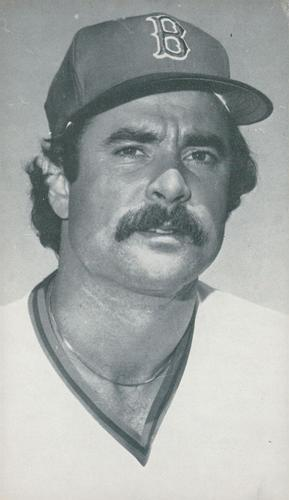
- Catcher
- Born: January 31, 1949 (age 77); Torrance, California, U.S.
- Batted: Right Threw: Right

MLB debut
- September 8, 1969, for the San Diego Padres

Last MLB appearance
- August 10, 1980, for the San Diego Padres

MLB statistics
- Batting average: .234
- Home runs: 31
- Runs batted in: 244
- Stats at Baseball Reference

Teams
- San Diego Padres (1969–1976); Cleveland Indians (1977); Boston Red Sox (1978); San Diego Padres (1979–1980)

Fred Lyn Kendall (born January 31, 1949) is an American former professional baseball player and coach who appeared in 877 games, primarily as a catcher, in Major League Baseball from 1969 to 1980 for the San Diego Padres, Cleveland Indians and Boston Red Sox. He was born in Torrance, California. His son, Jason Kendall, is also a former catcher who played in MLB from 1996 to 2010 and was a 3-time All-Star.

== Baseball career ==
Kendall batted and threw right-handed, and was listed as 6 feet 1 inch (1.85 m) tall and 185 pounds (84 kg). He entered pro baseball after being selected in the fourth round of the 1967 Major League Baseball draft out of Torrance High School by the Cincinnati Reds. After two strong seasons in Cincinnati's farm system, the brand-new Padres made Kendall their 14th selection in the 1968 Major League Baseball expansion draft. He split his first three seasons with San Diego between the parent team and clubs in the high minors before making the majors for good in 1972.

In 1973, he was voted the most-valuable Padre after setting career high marks in batting average (.282) and home runs (10). He was the regular catcher for the 1973–1976 Padres and 1977 Indians, leading the National League in games caught in 1976.

In 877 games spanning 12 MLB seasons, Kendall collected 603 hits, with 86 doubles, 11 triples, 31 homers and 244 runs batted in. He hit .234 lifetime with an OPS of .598.

Kendall managed in the Chicago White Sox' organization between 1992 and 1995, and served as major-league coach for eight seasons between 1996 and 2007 for the Detroit Tigers, Colorado Rockies and Kansas City Royals.

His son Jason, also a catcher, had a 15-year career in the majors (1996 to 2010) and was a three-time National League All-Star.
