= Rafael Robles =

Dominican baseball player (1947-1998)

- 1971 Topps baseball card #408
- Shortstop
- Born: October 20, 1947; San Pedro de Macorís, Dominican Republic
- Died: August 13, 1998 (aged 50); New York, New York, U.S.
- Batted: Right Threw: Right

MLB debut
- April 8, 1969, for the San Diego Padres

Last MLB appearance
- June 10, 1972, for the San Diego Padres

MLB statistics
- Batting average: .188
- Home runs: 0
- Runs batted in: 3
- Stats at Baseball Reference

Teams
- San Diego Padres (1969–1970, 1972)

Rafael Orlando Robles Natera (October 20, 1947 – August 13, 1998) was a Dominican shortstop in Major League Baseball. He was born in San Pedro de Macorís, Dominican Republic. He was signed by the San Francisco Giants as an amateur free agent before the 1967 season, and later drafted by the San Diego Padres from the San Francisco Giants as the 51st pick in the 1968 Major League Baseball expansion draft. He played for the San Diego Padres from 1969 to 1970, and again in 1972.

Robles was the first player to come to bat in San Diego Padres history. On April 8, 1969, he led off the bottom of the 1st against right-hander Don Wilson of the Houston Astros. He reached base on an error by Hall of Fame second baseman Joe Morgan, then stole second base, but did not score.

He was at best an average fielding shortstop (.958) and a below-average hitter (.188) during his brief major league career. (47 games played)

Rafael Robles died in New York, New York at the age of 50. His son Orlando Robles is a New York-based Latin urban artist who goes by the stage name of YoungSosa. In interviews his son has been asked about his father's baseball career and has stated he is very proud of his fathers accomplishments as a professional baseball player.
