= Gary Ross (baseball) =

American baseball player (born 1947)

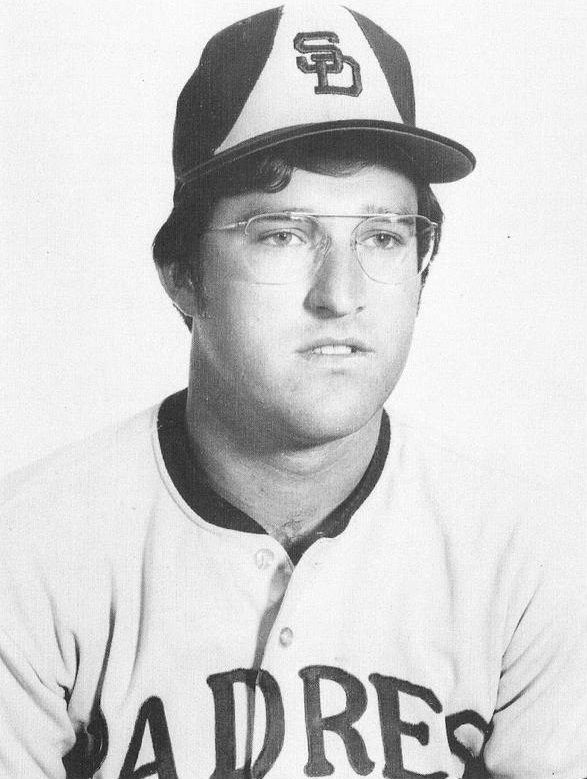
- Pitcher
- Born: September 16, 1947 (age 78); Port Vue, Pennsylvania, U.S.
- Batted: Right Threw: Right

MLB debut
- June 28, 1968, for the Chicago Cubs

Last MLB appearance
- July 8, 1977, for the California Angels

MLB statistics
- Win–loss record: 25–47
- Earned run average: 3.92
- Strikeouts: 378
- Stats at Baseball Reference

Teams
- Chicago Cubs (1968–1969); San Diego Padres (1969–1974); California Angels (1975–1977)

Gary Douglas Ross (born September 16, 1947) is an American former professional baseball player, a right-handed pitcher in the Major Leagues from 1968 to 1977. He played for the Chicago Cubs, San Diego Padres, and California Angels.

== Biography ==
Born in McKeesport, Pennsylvania on September 16, 1947, Ross stands at 6 feet 1 inch (1.85 m) tall and weighs 185 pounds (84 kg).

Throughout his career, Ross appeared in 283 Major League games, 59 as a starting pitcher. On April 24, 1969, he was traded alongside Joe Niekro and Frankie Librán from the Chicago Cubs to the Padres in exchange for Dick Selma. Notably, Ross lost a Padres' club-record 11 consecutive decisions in 1969, a season where the expansion team suffered a franchise-record 110 losses, finishing 41 games out of first place.

All told, he gave up 764 hits and 288 bases on balls in 713 2/3 innings pitched, with seven saves and 378 strikeouts.
