= Sonny Ruberto =

American baseball player (1946–2014)

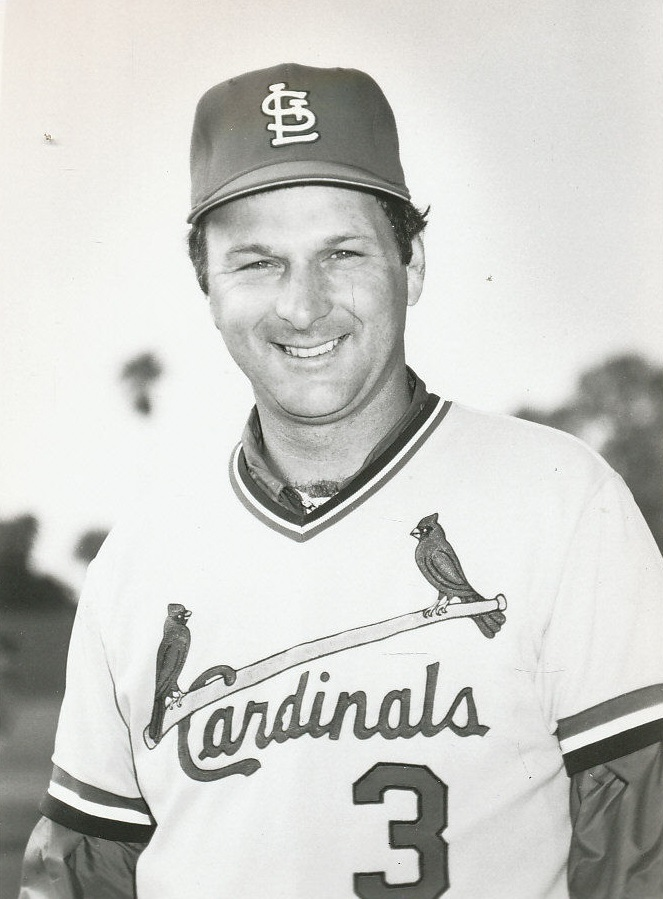
- Ruberto in 1978
- Catcher
- Born: January 2, 1946; Staten Island, New York, U.S.
- Died: March 25, 2014 (aged 68); Ave Maria, Florida, U.S.
- Batted: Right Threw: Right

MLB debut
- May 25, 1969, for the San Diego Padres

Last MLB appearance
- September 24, 1972, for the Cincinnati Reds

MLB statistics
- Batting average: .125
- Hits / At-bats: 3-for-24
- Games played: 21
- Stats at Baseball Reference

Teams
- As player: San Diego Padres (1969); Cincinnati Reds (1972); As coach: St. Louis Cardinals (1977–1978)

John Edward Ruberto [Sonny] (January 2, 1946 – March 25, 2014) was an American backup catcher and pinch runner in Major League Baseball who played over parts of two seasons for the San Diego Padres (1969) and the Cincinnati Reds (1972). Listed at 5' 11", 175 lb., he batted and threw right handed.

Besides, Ruberto worked as a Minor league manager and coach in the St. Louis Cardinals organization.

Ruberto died at a hospice center in Florida of cancer at age 68 on March 25, 2014.

== See also ==
- List of St. Louis Cardinals coaches
