= 1968 Philadelphia Phillies season =

Major League Baseball season

1968 Philadelphia Phillies
- League: National League
- Ballpark: Connie Mack Stadium
- City: Philadelphia
- Record: 76–86 (.469)
- League place: 8th
- Owners: R. R. M. Carpenter, Jr.
- General managers: John J. Quinn
- Managers: Gene Mauch, George Myatt, Bob Skinner
- Television: WFIL
- Radio: WCAU (By Saam, Bill Campbell, Richie Ashburn)

The 1968 Philadelphia Phillies season was the 86th season in the history of the franchise, and the 31st season for the Philadelphia Phillies at Connie Mack Stadium. The Phillies finished eighth in the National League with a record of 76 wins and 86 losses, 21 games behind the NL pennant-winning Cardinals.

== Offseason ==
- November 28, 1967: Doc Edwards was drafted by the Phillies from the Houston Astros in the 1967 minor league draft.
- December 15, 1967: Jim Bunning was traded by the Phillies to the Pittsburgh Pirates for Woodie Fryman, Bill Laxton, Don Money and Harold Clem (minors).
- January 26, 1968: Manny Trillo was signed by the Phillies as an amateur free agent.

== Regular season ==
The Phillies were scheduled to open the 1968 season on April 9, 1968, in Los Angeles. However, the assassination of Martin Luther King Jr., on April 4, lead to days of national unrest. President Johnson declared Monday, April 8, a national day of mourning, and the funeral was scheduled for April 9. The Dodgers initially refused to postpone the game, leading Phillies GM John Quinn and President Bob Carpenter to announce that the Phillies would not play on April 9 even under threat of forfeit. On April 7, Quinn told reporters, "Under the rules, the game can be forfeited and we could be fined. But we have made our final decision. We will not play." In consultation with NL President Warren Giles, the Dodgers eventually agreed and postponed the game. The Phillies opened April 10, 1968, with a Chris Short 2 to 0 shutout of the Dodgers.

On July 28, 1968, George Culver of the Cincinnati Reds pitched a 6–1 no-hitter against the Phillies in the second game of a doubleheader at Connie Mack Stadium.

=== Season standings ===
National League
| Team | W | L | Pct. | GB | Home | Road |
|---|---|---|---|---|---|---|
| St. Louis Cardinals | 97 | 65 | .599 | — | 47‍–‍34 | 50‍–‍31 |
| San Francisco Giants | 88 | 74 | .543 | 9 | 42‍–‍39 | 46‍–‍35 |
| Chicago Cubs | 84 | 78 | .519 | 13 | 47‍–‍34 | 37‍–‍44 |
| Cincinnati Reds | 83 | 79 | .512 | 14 | 40‍–‍41 | 43‍–‍38 |
| Atlanta Braves | 81 | 81 | .500 | 16 | 41‍–‍40 | 40‍–‍41 |
| Pittsburgh Pirates | 80 | 82 | .494 | 17 | 40‍–‍41 | 40‍–‍41 |
| Los Angeles Dodgers | 76 | 86 | .469 | 21 | 41‍–‍40 | 35‍–‍46 |
| Philadelphia Phillies | 76 | 86 | .469 | 21 | 38‍–‍43 | 38‍–‍43 |
| New York Mets | 73 | 89 | .451 | 24 | 32‍–‍49 | 41‍–‍40 |
| Houston Astros | 72 | 90 | .444 | 25 | 42‍–‍39 | 30‍–‍51 |

=== Record vs. opponents ===
1968 National League record Sources:
| Team | ATL | CHC | CIN | HOU | LAD | NYM | PHI | PIT | SF | STL |
|---|---|---|---|---|---|---|---|---|---|---|
| Atlanta | — | 8–10 | 10–8 | 11–7 | 9–9 | 12–6–1 | 11–7 | 6–12 | 9–9 | 5–13 |
| Chicago | 10–8 | — | 7–11 | 10–8 | 12–6 | 8–10 | 9–9 | 10–8 | 9–9–1 | 9–9 |
| Cincinnati | 8–10 | 11–7 | — | 9–9 | 9–9 | 10–8 | 11–7 | 10–8–1 | 8–10 | 7–11 |
| Houston | 7–11 | 8–10 | 9–9 | — | 11–7 | 10–8 | 9–9 | 5–13 | 8–10 | 5–13 |
| Los Angeles | 9–9 | 6–12 | 9–9 | 7–11 | — | 7–11 | 10–8 | 10–8 | 9–9 | 9–9 |
| New York | 6–12–1 | 10–8 | 8–10 | 8–10 | 11–7 | — | 8–10 | 9–9 | 7–11 | 6–12 |
| Philadelphia | 7–11 | 9–9 | 7–11 | 9–9 | 8–10 | 10–8 | — | 9–9 | 9–9 | 8–10 |
| Pittsburgh | 12–6 | 8–10 | 8–10–1 | 13–5 | 8–10 | 9–9 | 9–9 | — | 7–11 | 6–12 |
| San Francisco | 9–9 | 9–9–1 | 10–8 | 10–8 | 9–9 | 11–7 | 9–9 | 11–7 | — | 10–8 |
| St. Louis | 13–5 | 9–9 | 11–7 | 13–5 | 9–9 | 12–6 | 10–8 | 12–6 | 8–10 | — |

=== Notable transactions ===
- June 7, 1968: Buddy Schultz was drafted by the Phillies in the 4th round of the 1968 Major League Baseball draft, but did not sign.

=== Game log ===
Legend
| | Phillies win |
| | Phillies loss |
| | Postponement |
| **Bold** | Phillies team member |

1968 Game Log
Overall Record: 76–86
April (8–9)

| # | Date | Opponent | Score | Win | Loss | Save | Attendance | Record |
|---|---|---|---|---|---|---|---|---|
| – | April 9 | @ Dodgers | Postponed (Funeral of Martin Luther King Jr.); Makeup: April 16 | | | | | |
| 1 | April 10 | @ Dodgers | 2–0 | **Chris Short** (1–0) | Claude Osteen (0–1) | None | 28,138 | 1–0 |
| 2 | April 11 | @ Astros | 3–7 | Don Wilson (1–0) | **Larry Jackson** (0–1) | None | 11,972 | 1–1 |
| 3 | April 12 | @ Astros | 2–5 | Denny Lemaster (1–0) | **Woodie Fryman** (0–1) | John Buzhardt (1) | 16,415 | 1–2 |
| 4 | April 13 | @ Astros | 3–4 | Dave Giusti (1–0) | **Grant Jackson** (0–1) | None | 13,164 | 1–3 |
| 5 | April 14 (1) | @ Giants | 2–13 | Juan Marichal (1–0) | **Rick Wise** (0–1) | None | see 2nd game | 1–4 |
| 6 | April 14 (2) | @ Giants | 1–3 | Ray Sadecki (1–0) | **Chris Short** (1–1) | None | 18,314 | 1–5 |
| 7 | April 16 | @ Dodgers | 3–5 | Mike Kekich (1–0) | **Larry Jackson** (0–2) | Hank Aguirre (1) | 16,571 | 1–6 |
| 8 | April 17 | Dodgers | 3–2 | **Woodie Fryman** (1–1) | Don Drysdale (1–1) | **Turk Farrell** (1) | 15,817 | 2–6 |
| 9 | April 19 | Astros | 2–1 | **Chris Short** (2–1) | Dave Giusti (1–1) | None | 6,671 | 3–6 |
| 10 | April 20 | Astros | 7–1 | **Larry Jackson** (1–2) | Larry Dierker (1–2) | None | 3,738 | 4–6 |
| 11 | April 21 | Astros | 8–0 | **Woodie Fryman** (2–1) | Don Wilson (1–1) | None | 5,634 | 5–6 |
| 12 | April 22 | Giants | 2–1 (10) | **Rick Wise** (1–1) | Frank Linzy (1–2) | None | 4,231 | 6–6 |
| 13 | April 23 | Giants | 1–7 | Juan Marichal (3–0) | **Chris Short** (2–2) | None | 8,618 | 6–7 |
| – | April 24 | Giants | Postponed (rain); Makeup: June 18 as a traditional double-header | | | | | |
| 14 | April 26 | @ Braves | 1–3 | Pat Jarvis (1–2) | **Larry Jackson** (1–3) | None | 10,614 | 6–8 |
| 15 | April 27 | @ Braves | 4–1 | **Woodie Fryman** (3–1) | Dick Kelley (1–2) | None | 14,207 | 7–8 |
| 16 | April 28 | @ Braves | 4–3 | **Rick Wise** (2–1) | Phil Niekro (2–2) | **Turk Farrell** (2) | 13,442 | 8–8 |
| 17 | April 30 | @ Mets | 0–1 | Don Cardwell (1–2) | **Chris Short** (2–3) | None | 3,771 | 8–9 |

May (13–11)

| # | Date | Opponent | Score | Win | Loss | Save | Attendance | Record |
|---|---|---|---|---|---|---|---|---|
| 18 | May 1 | @ Mets | 7–2 (11) | **Larry Jackson** (2–3) | Ron Taylor (0–1) | **Grant Jackson** (1) | 11,450 | 9–9 |
| 19 | May 2 | @ Mets | 0–3 | Nolan Ryan (2–2) | **Woodie Fryman** (3–2) | Ron Taylor (2) | 9,795 | 9–10 |
| 20 | May 3 | Pirates | 3–2 | **Turk Farrell** (1–0) | Ron Kline (0–1) | None | 9,433 | 10–10 |
| 21 | May 4 | Pirates | 3–2 | **Dick Hall** (1–0) | Roy Face (0–1) | None | 15,834 | 11–10 |
| 22 | May 5 | Pirates | 2–5 | Dave Wickersham (1–0) | **Larry Jackson** (2–4) | Bob Moose (3) | 9,407 | 11–11 |
| 23 | May 6 | @ Reds | 1–10 | George Culver (1–1) | **Woodie Fryman** (3–3) | None | 3,991 | 11–12 |
| 24 | May 7 | @ Reds | 5–2 | **Rick Wise** (3–1) | Jim Maloney (2–2) | **Turk Farrell** (3) | 4,953 | 12–12 |
| 25 | May 8 | @ Reds | 6–2 | **Dick Hall** (2–0) | Bob Lee (2–2) | None | 3,535 | 13–12 |
| 26 | May 9 | @ Reds | 7–3 | **Larry Jackson** (3–4) | Milt Pappas (2–2) | **Turk Farrell** (4) | 3,735 | 14–12 |
| 27 | May 10 | @ Pirates | 1–2 | Bob Veale (1–3) | **Woodie Fryman** (3–4) | Roy Face (3) | 9,397 | 14–13 |
| – | May 11 | @ Pirates | Postponed (rain); Makeup: July 11 as a traditional double-header | | | | | |
| 28 | May 12 | @ Pirates | 1–2 | Al McBean (5–2) | **Jeff James** (0–1) | None | 12,203 | 14–14 |
| 29 | May 13 | Braves | 2–4 | Phil Niekro (3–3) | **Chris Short** (2–4) | None | 3,126 | 14–15 |
| 30 | May 14 | Braves | 1–3 | Ron Reed (4–0) | **Larry Jackson** (3–5) | None | 4,531 | 14–16 |
| – | May 15 | Braves | Postponed (rain); Makeup: July 26 as a traditional double-header | | | | | |
| – | May 16 | Braves | Postponed (rain); Makeup: August 28 as a traditional double-header | | | | | |
| 31 | May 17 | Cardinals | 1–0 (10) | **Woodie Fryman** (4–4) | Bob Gibson (3–3) | None | 17,034 | 15–16 |
| 32 | May 18 | Cardinals | 3–2 | **Larry Jackson** (4–5) | Nelson Briles (5–3) | None | 12,941 | 16–16 |
| 33 | May 19 | Cardinals | 4–3 | **Turk Farrell** (2–0) | Joe Hoerner (2–1) | None | 27,725 | 17–16 |
| 34 | May 21 | @ Cubs | 5–6 | Rich Nye (3–4) | **Turk Farrell** (2–1) | None | 4,422 | 17–17 |
| 35 | May 22 | Mets | 8–0 | **Woodie Fryman** (5–4) | Don Cardwell (1–5) | None | 5,717 | 18–17 |
| – | May 23 | Mets | Postponed (rain); Makeup: September 20 as a traditional double-header | | | | | |
| 36 | May 24 | @ Cardinals | 1–5 | Steve Carlton (5–1) | **Chris Short** (2–5) | None | 34,515 | 18–18 |
| 37 | May 25 | @ Cardinals | 1–0 | **Larry Jackson** (5–5) | Larry Jaster (2–2) | **Turk Farrell** (5) | 19,432 | 19–18 |
| 38 | May 26 | @ Cardinals | 9–3 | **Woodie Fryman** (6–4) | Hal Gilson (0–1) | None | 42,446 | 20–18 |
| – | May 28 | Cubs | Postponed (rain); Makeup: July 17 as a traditional double-header | | | | | |
| 39 | May 29 (1) | Cubs | 2–9 | Ken Holtzman (4–3) | **Chris Short** (2–6) | None | see 2nd game | 20–19 |
| 40 | May 29 (2) | Cubs | 8–3 | **Rick Wise** (4–1) | Rich Nye (3–5) | None | 18,128 | 21–19 |
| – | May 30 | Cubs | Postponed (rain); Makeup: September 13 as a traditional double-header | | | | | |
| 41 | May 31 | Reds | 4–5 | Gary Nolan (1–0) | **Turk Farrell** (2–2) | George Culver (2) | 9,112 | 21–20 |

June (12–16)

| # | Date | Opponent | Score | Win | Loss | Save | Attendance | Record |
|---|---|---|---|---|---|---|---|---|
| 42 | June 1 | Reds | 12–0 | **Woodie Fryman** (7–4) | Milt Pappas (2–5) | None | 10,566 | 22–20 |
| 43 | June 2 | Reds | 3–5 | Jim Maloney (5–3) | **Rick Wise** (4–2) | None | 6,662 | 22–21 |
| 44 | June 3 | @ Giants | 1–0 | **Chris Short** (3–6) | Ray Sadecki (6–6) | None | 3,609 | 23–21 |
| 45 | June 4 | @ Giants | 5–1 | **Larry Jackson** (6–5) | Mike McCormick (4–7) | None | 4,870 | 24–21 |
| 46 | June 5 | @ Giants | 2–1 | **Woodie Fryman** (8–4) | Gaylord Perry (6–3) | None | 3,018 | 25–21 |
| 47 | June 6 | @ Giants | 2–7 | Juan Marichal (10–2) | **Rick Wise** (4–3) | None | 3,758 | 25–22 |
| 48 | June 7 | @ Dodgers | 0–2 | Claude Osteen (5–7) | **Chris Short** (3–7) | None | 18,249 | 25–23 |
| 49 | June 8 | @ Dodgers | 3–5 | Don Drysdale (8–3) | **Larry Jackson** (6–6) | Hank Aguirre (2) | 50,060 | 25–24 |
| 50 | June 9 | @ Dodgers | 3–4 | Jim Brewer (3–1) | **Woodie Fryman** (8–5) | None | 18,781 | 25–25 |
| 51 | June 11 | Astros | 1–5 | Larry Dierker (6–8) | **Rick Wise** (4–4) | None | 5,243 | 25–26 |
| – | June 12 | Astros | Postponed (rain); Makeup: August 13 as a traditional double-header | | | | | |
| 52 | June 13 | Astros | 3–2 | **Chris Short** (4–7) | Dave Giusti (4–7) | **Turk Farrell** (6) | 4,542 | 26–26 |
| 53 | June 14 (1) | Dodgers | 0–6 | Bill Singer (6–5) | **Jeff James** (0–2) | None | see 2nd game | 26–27 |
| 54 | June 14 (2) | Dodgers | 2–1 | **Woodie Fryman** (9–5) | Jim Brewer (3–2) | None | 19,716 | 27–27 |
| 55 | June 15 | Dodgers | 6–5 | **Turk Farrell** (3–2) | Hank Aguirre (0–1) | None | 11,868 | 28–27 |
| 56 | June 16 | Dodgers | 1–2 | Claude Osteen (6–8) | **Rick Wise** (4–5) | Jim Brewer (3) | 29,084 | 28–28 |
| – | June 17 | Dodgers | Postponed (rain); Makeup: September 2 as a traditional double-header | | | | | |
| 57 | June 18 (1) | Giants | 10–2 | **Chris Short** (5–7) | Gaylord Perry (6–4) | None | see 2nd game | 29–28 |
| 58 | June 18 (2) | Giants | 9–1 | **Woodie Fryman** (10–5) | Mike McCormick (5–9) | None | 22,184 | 30–28 |
| 59 | June 19 | Giants | 1–5 | Juan Marichal (13–2) | **Larry Jackson** (6–7) | None | 15,520 | 30–29 |
| 60 | June 20 | Giants | 2–1 | **Rick Wise** (5–5) | Ray Sadecki (7–9) | None | 12,656 | 31–29 |
| 61 | June 21 | @ Astros | 1–2 | Mike Cuellar (4–3) | **Jeff James** (0–3) | None | 19,274 | 31–30 |
| 62 | June 22 | @ Astros | 7–6 | **Gary Wagner** (1–0) | Wade Blasingame (1–2) | **Turk Farrell** (7) | 21,015 | 32–30 |
| 63 | June 23 | @ Astros | 4–7 | Denny Lemaster (7–6) | **Woodie Fryman** (10–6) | Fred Gladding (2) | 15,876 | 32–31 |
| 64 | June 25 | @ Braves | 1–6 | Ron Reed (8–3) | **Larry Jackson** (6–8) | None | 11,876 | 32–32 |
| 65 | June 26 | @ Braves | 3–2 (11) | **John Boozer** (1–0) | Jim Britton (3–2) | **Turk Farrell** (8) | 10,128 | 33–32 |
| 66 | June 27 | @ Braves | 3–4 | Pat Jarvis (8–5) | **Chris Short** (5–8) | Cecil Upshaw (4) | 12,347 | 33–33 |
| 67 | June 28 | Pirates | 1–10 | Jim Bunning (4–9) | **Woodie Fryman** (10–7) | None | 18,994 | 33–34 |
| 68 | June 29 | Pirates | 0–1 | Bob Moose (3–5) | **Larry Jackson** (6–9) | None | 17,052 | 33–35 |
| 69 | June 30 | Pirates | 2–5 | Bob Veale (6–7) | **Turk Farrell** (3–3) | None | 8,884 | 33–36 |

July (15–19)

| # | Date | Opponent | Score | Win | Loss | Save | Attendance | Record |
|---|---|---|---|---|---|---|---|---|
| 70 | July 1 | @ Cubs | 6–4 | **Chris Short** (6–8) | Rich Nye (4–9) | **John Boozer** (1) | 9,614 | 34–36 |
| 71 | July 2 | @ Cubs | 3–5 | Ferguson Jenkins (7–9) | **Woodie Fryman** (10–8) | None | 10,932 | 34–37 |
| 72 | July 3 | @ Cubs | 3–2 | **Larry Jackson** (7–9) | Ken Holtzman (5–5) | **Chris Short** (1) | 9,179 | 35–37 |
| 73 | July 4 (1) | @ Cubs | 2–6 | Joe Niekro (7–6) | **Grant Jackson** (0–2) | Phil Regan (13) | see 2nd game | 35–38 |
| 74 | July 4 (2) | @ Cubs | 7–4 | **Jeff James** (1–3) | Darcy Fast (0–1) | **John Boozer** (2) | 21,516 | 36–38 |
| 75 | July 5 | Mets | 3–1 | **Chris Short** (7–8) | Tom Seaver (7–6) | None | 10,084 | 37–38 |
| 76 | July 6 | Mets | 6–11 | Al Jackson (2–3) | **Woodie Fryman** (10–9) | Cal Koonce (6) | 4,032 | 37–39 |
| 77 | July 7 (1) | Mets | 4–3 | **Dick Hall** (3–0) | Ron Taylor (1–2) | None | see 2nd game | 38–39 |
| 78 | July 7 (2) | Mets | 2–4 | Danny Frisella (2–3) | **Larry Jackson** (7–10) | Tom Seaver (1) | 14,478 | 38–40 |
| – | July 9 | **1968 Major League Baseball All-Star Game at the Houston Astrodome in Houston** | | | | | | |
| 79 | July 11 (1) | @ Pirates | 5–0 | **Larry Jackson** (8–10) | Bob Veale (7–9) | None | see 2nd game | 39–40 |
| 80 | July 11 (2) | @ Pirates | 4–1 | **Chris Short** (8–8) | Bob Moose (3–6) | **John Boozer** (3) | 15,371 | 40–40 |
| 81 | July 12 | @ Pirates | 3–2 | **Jeff James** (2–3) | Jim Bunning (4–11) | **John Boozer** (4) | 9,206 | 41–40 |
| 82 | July 13 | @ Pirates | 3–2 (16) | **Chris Short** (9–8) | Dock Ellis (1–1) | None | 6,869 | 42–40 |
| 83 | July 14 (1) | @ Mets | 5–3 | **Rick Wise** (6–5) | Al Jackson (2–4) | None | see 2nd game | 43–40 |
| 84 | July 14 (2) | @ Mets | 9–2 | **Grant Jackson** (1–2) | Danny Frisella (2–4) | None | 57,011 | 44–40 |
| 85 | July 15 | @ Mets | 5–3 | **Larry Jackson** (9–10) | Nolan Ryan (6–8) | **John Boozer** (5) | 20,628 | 45–40 |
| 86 | July 16 | Cubs | 3–4 (12) | Phil Regan (8–2) | **Gary Wagner** (1–1) | Joe Niekro (1) | 11,980 | 45–41 |
| 87 | July 17 (1) | Cubs | 4–8 | Bill Hands (9–5) | **Woodie Fryman** (10–10) | Phil Regan (14) | see 2nd game | 45–42 |
| 88 | July 17 (2) | Cubs | 8–0 | **Jeff James** (3–3) | Rich Nye (4–11) | None | 17,920 | 46–42 |
| 89 | July 19 | @ Reds | 2–9 | George Culver (7–9) | **Rick Wise** (6–6) | Clay Carroll (3) | 12,400 | 46–43 |
| 90 | July 20 | @ Reds | 3–9 | Gerry Arrigo (5–5) | **Larry Jackson** (9–11) | Ted Abernathy (10) | 13,256 | 46–44 |
| 91 | July 21 | @ Reds | 6–12 | Tony Cloninger (2–5) | **Chris Short** (9–9) | Ted Abernathy (11) | 10,885 | 46–45 |
| 92 | July 22 | @ Cardinals | 4–5 | Wayne Granger (4–0) | **John Boozer** (1–1) | None | 17,619 | 46–46 |
| 93 | July 23 | @ Cardinals | 5–11 | Larry Jaster (8–5) | **Rick Wise** (6–7) | Dick Hughes (3) | 26,199 | 46–47 |
| 94 | July 24 | @ Cardinals | 1–3 | Ray Washburn (9–3) | **Larry Jackson** (9–12) | Joe Hoerner (11) | 23,828 | 46–48 |
| 95 | July 25 | @ Cardinals | 0–5 | Bob Gibson (14–5) | **Chris Short** (9–10) | None | 28,147 | 46–49 |
| 96 | July 26 (1) | Braves | 4–5 | George Stone (1–1) | **Grant Jackson** (1–3) | Claude Raymond (7) | see 2nd game | 46–50 |
| 97 | July 26 (2) | Braves | 2–3 | Milt Pappas (6–7) | **Jeff James** (3–4) | Cecil Upshaw (7) | 16,334 | 46–51 |
| 98 | July 27 | Braves | 1–0 | **Woodie Fryman** (11–10) | Jim Britton (4–5) | None | 12,020 | 47–51 |
| 99 | July 28 | Braves | 3–0 | **Larry Jackson** (10–12) | Pat Jarvis (10–8) | None | 8,173 | 48–51 |
| 100 | July 29 (1) | Reds | 6–7 | Ted Abernathy (8–1) | **Turk Farrell** (3–4) | None | see 2nd game | 48–52 |
| 101 | July 29 (2) | Reds | 1–6 | George Culver (9–9) | **Chris Short** (9–11) | None | 14,083 | 48–53 |
| 102 | July 30 | Reds | 2–5 | Tony Cloninger (3–6) | **Rick Wise** (6–8) | Clay Carroll (6) | 7,213 | 48–54 |
| 103 | July 31 | Cardinals | 2–3 | Nelson Briles (13–7) | **Woodie Fryman** (11–11) | None | 14,811 | 48–55 |

August (14–18)

| # | Date | Opponent | Score | Win | Loss | Save | Attendance | Record |
|---|---|---|---|---|---|---|---|---|
| 104 | August 1 | Cardinals | 1–2 (8) | Steve Carlton (11–5) | **Larry Jackson** (10–13) | None | 12,674 | 48–56 |
| 105 | August 2 | @ Astros | 3–4 | Pat House (1–0) | **Grant Jackson** (1–4) | Steve Shea (3) | 12,957 | 48–57 |
| 106 | August 3 | @ Astros | 2–1 | **Chris Short** (10–11) | Mike Cuellar (6–6) | None | 19,185 | 49–57 |
| 107 | August 4 | @ Astros | 3–2 | **Rick Wise** (7–8) | Steve Shea (1–2) | None | 15,003 | 50–57 |
| 108 | August 5 | @ Giants | 6–4 (10) | **Dick Hall** (4–0) | Mike McCormick (7–13) | None | 5,429 | 51–57 |
| 109 | August 6 | @ Giants | 1–4 | Gaylord Perry (10–10) | **Larry Jackson** (10–14) | None | 6,246 | 51–58 |
| 110 | August 7 | @ Giants | 3–4 | Frank Linzy (5–7) | **Dick Hall** (4–1) | None | 5,109 | 51–59 |
| 111 | August 8 | @ Dodgers | 1–0 | **Rick Wise** (8–8) | Bill Singer (9–11) | None | 14,198 | 52–59 |
| 112 | August 9 | @ Dodgers | 3–2 | **Chris Short** (11–11) | Claude Osteen (8–17) | **Gary Wagner** (1) | 15,150 | 53–59 |
| 113 | August 10 | @ Dodgers | 2–3 (14) | Hank Aguirre (1–2) | **Grant Jackson** (1–5) | None | 15,559 | 53–60 |
| 114 | August 11 | @ Dodgers | 0–1 | Don Drysdale (13–10) | **Larry Jackson** (10–15) | None | 13,365 | 53–61 |
| 115 | August 13 (1) | Astros | 0–5 | Don Wilson (9–12) | **Rick Wise** (8–9) | None | see 2nd game | 53–62 |
| 116 | August 13 (2) | Astros | 4–2 | **Jeff James** (4–4) | Mike Cuellar (6–8) | **Gary Wagner** (2) | 7,021 | 54–62 |
| 117 | August 14 | Astros | 4–3 | **Chris Short** (12–11) | Denny Lemaster (9–12) | **Gary Wagner** (3) | 4,040 | 55–62 |
| 118 | August 15 | Astros | 2–3 | Dave Giusti (7–12) | **Turk Farrell** (3–5) | Danny Coombs (1) | 3,217 | 55–63 |
| 119 | August 16 | Giants | 5–7 | Joe Gibbon (1–2) | **Gary Wagner** (1–2) | Bill Monbouquette (1) | 18,586 | 55–64 |
| 120 | August 17 | Giants | 4–6 | Juan Marichal (22–5) | **Rick Wise** (8–10) | Frank Linzy (8) | 9,526 | 55–65 |
| 121 | August 18 | Giants | 5–3 | **Gary Wagner** (2–2) | Bill Monbouquette (5–8) | None | 11,562 | 56–65 |
| 122 | August 19 | Cardinals | 0–2 | Bob Gibson (18–5) | **Woodie Fryman** (11–12) | None | 12,278 | 56–66 |
| 123 | August 20 | Cardinals | 8–2 | **Larry Jackson** (11–15) | Nelson Briles (16–8) | None | 9,379 | 57–66 |
| 124 | August 21 | Cardinals | 3–8 | Dick Hughes (2–2) | **Jerry Johnson** (0–1) | Joe Hoerner (13) | 9,500 | 57–67 |
| 125 | August 22 | Cardinals | 7–3 | **Chris Short** (13–11) | Larry Jaster (8–10) | None | 10,193 | 58–67 |
| 126 | August 23 | @ Braves | 0–6 | Pat Jarvis (13–9) | **Rick Wise** (8–11) | None | 23,408 | 58–68 |
| 127 | August 24 | @ Braves | 4–3 | **Jerry Johnson** (1–1) | George Stone (3–3) | **Gary Wagner** (4) | 9,053 | 59–68 |
| 128 | August 25 | @ Braves | 4–1 | **Larry Jackson** (12–15) | Phil Niekro (11–10) | None | 8,049 | 60–68 |
| 129 | August 26 | @ Reds | 5–6 | Clay Carroll (6–5) | **Gary Wagner** (2–3) | None | 6,221 | 60–69 |
| 130 | August 27 | @ Reds | 0–10 | Tony Cloninger (5–6) | **Rick Wise** (8–12) | None | 6,623 | 60–70 |
| 131 | August 28 (1) | Braves | 2–9 | George Stone (4–3) | **Woodie Fryman** (11–13) | None | see 2nd game | 60–71 |
| 132 | August 28 (2) | Braves | 1–2 | Pat Jarvis (14–9) | **Jerry Johnson** (1–2) | None | 6,713 | 60–72 |
| 133 | August 29 | Braves | 0–6 | Phil Niekro (11–11) | **Larry Jackson** (12–16) | None | 4,396 | 60–73 |
| 134 | August 30 | Reds | 7–4 | **Chris Short** (14–11) | Jim Maloney (11–9) | **Turk Farrell** (9) | 6,614 | 61–73 |
| 135 | August 31 | Reds | 3–2 | **Turk Farrell** (4–5) | Clay Carroll (6–6) | None | 6,629 | 62–73 |

September (14–13)

| # | Date | Opponent | Score | Win | Loss | Save | Attendance | Record |
|---|---|---|---|---|---|---|---|---|
| 136 | September 1 | Reds | 4–3 | **Jerry Johnson** (2–2) | Ted Abernathy (9–3) | None | 4,381 | 63–73 |
| 137 | September 2 (1) | Dodgers | 5–4 | **John Boozer** (2–1) | John Purdin (2–3) | **Gary Wagner** (5) | see 2nd game | 64–73 |
| 138 | September 2 (2) | Dodgers | 7–5 | **Woodie Fryman** (12–13) | Mike Kekich (2–9) | **Turk Farrell** (10) | 5,240 | 65–73 |
| 139 | September 3 | Dodgers | 9–10 | Jim Brewer (7–3) | **John Boozer** (2–2) | None | 2,812 | 65–74 |
| 140 | September 4 | Dodgers | 0–3 | Don Sutton (7–14) | **Larry Jackson** (12–17) | None | 3,282 | 65–75 |
| 141 | September 6 | @ Cubs | 5–2 | **Rick Wise** (9–12) | Bill Hands (15–9) | None | 2,621 | 66–75 |
| 142 | September 7 | @ Cubs | 4–2 | **Chris Short** (15–11) | Ferguson Jenkins (17–13) | **Gary Wagner** (6) | 13,578 | 67–75 |
| 143 | September 8 | @ Cubs | 3–10 | Ken Holtzman (10–11) | **Woodie Fryman** (12–14) | None | 15,789 | 67–76 |
| 144 | September 9 | @ Pirates | 8–7 (15) | **Chris Short** (16–11) | Bruce Dal Canton (1–1) | None | 2,664 | 68–76 |
| – | September 10 | @ Pirates | Postponed (rain); Makeup: September 11 as a traditional double-header | | | | | |
| 145 | September 11 | @ Pirates | 8–6 (12) | **Gary Wagner** (3–3) | Al McBean (9–12) | **Turk Farrell** (11) | see 2nd game | 69–76 |
| 146 | September 12 | @ Pirates | 4–6 | Steve Blass (15–5) | **Rick Wise** (9–13) | Luke Walker (3) | 2,789 | 69–77 |
| 147 | September 13 (1) | Cubs | 3–1 | **Chris Short** (17–11) | Ken Holtzman (10–12) | None | see 2nd game | 70–77 |
| 148 | September 13 (2) | Cubs | 1–9 | Rich Nye (6–12) | **Jerry Johnson** (2–3) | None | 5,253 | 70–78 |
| 149 | September 14 | Cubs | 4–1 | **Larry Jackson** (13–17) | Bill Hands (16–10) | None | 2,251 | 71–78 |
| 150 | September 15 | Cubs | 0–4 | Ferguson Jenkins (18–14) | **Grant Jackson** (1–6) | None | 4,015 | 71–79 |
| 151 | September 16 | Pirates | 1–6 | Dock Ellis (5–4) | **Rick Wise** (9–14) | None | 2,087 | 71–80 |
| 152 | September 17 | Pirates | 2–4 | Bob Moose (7–10) | **Chris Short** (17–12) | Bruce Dal Canton (1) | 2,576 | 71–81 |
| 153 | September 18 | Pirates | 2–1 | **Jerry Johnson** (3–3) | Bob Veale (13–14) | **Gary Wagner** (7) | 2,463 | 72–81 |
| 154 | September 20 (1) | Mets | 2–3 | Tom Seaver (15–11) | **Gary Wagner** (3–4) | None | see 2nd game | 72–82 |
| 155 | September 20 (2) | Mets | 4–5 | Cal Koonce (6–4) | **Turk Farrell** (4–6) | None | 4,443 | 72–83 |
| 156 | September 21 | Mets | 4–3 | **Chris Short** (18–12) | Dick Selma (9–10) | **Gary Wagner** (8) | 1,854 | 73–83 |
| 157 | September 22 | Mets | 2–5 | Jim McAndrew (4–7) | **Rick Wise** (9–15) | Don Cardwell (1) | 3,259 | 73–84 |
| 158 | September 24 | @ Cardinals | 2–1 | **Jerry Johnson** (4–3) | Ray Washburn (13–8) | None | 10,530 | 74–84 |
| 159 | September 25 | @ Cardinals | 4–5 | Nelson Briles (19–11) | **Chris Short** (18–13) | Joe Hoerner (16) | 10,992 | 74–85 |
| 160 | September 27 | @ Mets | 3–2 (11) | **Gary Wagner** (4–4) | Ron Taylor (1–5) | **Turk Farrell** (12) | 11,169 | 75–85 |
| 161 | September 28 | @ Mets | 1–3 | Jerry Koosman (19–12) | **Jerry Johnson** (4–4) | None | 9,140 | 75–86 |
| 162 | September 29 | @ Mets | 10–3 | **Chris Short** (19–13) | Tom Seaver (16–12) | None | 29,302 | 76–86 |

=== Roster ===
1968 Philadelphia Phillies
**Roster**
| **Pitchers**: 28 John Boozer; 33 Paul Brown; 21 Larry Colton; 32 Turk Farrell; 22 Woodie Fryman; 27 Dick Hall; 29 Grant Jackson; 46 Larry Jackson; 30 Jeff James; 33 Jerry Johnson; 41 Chris Short; 31 Gary Wagner; 38 Rick Wise | **Catchers**: 11 Clay Dalrymple; 9 Mike Ryan; 37 John Sullivan; **Infielders**: 20 Rick Joseph; 5 Don Money; 34 Roberto Peña; 16 Cookie Rojas; 18 Gary Sutherland; 8 Tony Taylor; 10 Bill White; 7 Bobby Wine | **Outfielders**: 15 Dick Allen; 12 Johnny Briggs; 6 Johnny Callison; 17 Doug Clemens; 25 Tony González; 24 Larry Hisle; 23 Don Lock; **Other batters**: 37 Howie Bedell | **Manager**: 4 Gene Mauch; 19 Bob Skinner; **Coaches**: 1 George Myatt; 2 Andy Seminick; 3 Al Widmar |

== Player stats ==
=== Batting ===
==== Starters by position ====
Note: Pos = Position; G = Games played; AB = At bats; H = Hits; Avg. = Batting average; HR = Home runs; RBI = Runs batted in

| Pos | Player | G | AB | H | Avg. | HR | RBI |
|---|---|---|---|---|---|---|---|
| C | Mike Ryan | 96 | 296 | 53 | .179 | 1 | 15 |
| 1B | Bill White | 127 | 385 | 92 | .239 | 9 | 40 |
| 2B | Cookie Rojas | 152 | 621 | 144 | .232 | 9 | 48 |
| SS | Roberto Peña | 138 | 500 | 130 | .260 | 1 | 38 |
| 3B | Tony Taylor | 145 | 547 | 137 | .250 | 3 | 38 |
| LF | Dick Allen | 152 | 521 | 137 | .263 | 33 | 90 |
| CF | Tony González | 121 | 416 | 110 | .264 | 3 | 38 |
| RF | Johnny Callison | 121 | 398 | 97 | .244 | 14 | 40 |

==== Other batters ====
Note: G = Games played; AB = At bats; H = Hits; Avg. = Batting average; HR = Home runs; RBI = Runs batted in

| Player | G | AB | H | Avg. | HR | RBI |
|---|---|---|---|---|---|---|
| Johnny Briggs | 110 | 338 | 86 | .254 | 7 | 31 |
| Don Lock | 99 | 248 | 52 | .210 | 8 | 34 |
| Clay Dalrymple | 85 | 241 | 50 | .207 | 3 | 26 |
| Rick Joseph | 66 | 155 | 34 | .219 | 3 | 12 |
| Gary Sutherland | 67 | 138 | 38 | .275 | 0 | 15 |
| Bobby Wine | 27 | 71 | 12 | .169 | 2 | 7 |
| Doug Clemens | 29 | 57 | 12 | .211 | 2 | 8 |
| John Sullivan | 12 | 18 | 4 | .222 | 0 | 1 |
| Don Money | 4 | 13 | 3 | .231 | 0 | 2 |
| Larry Hisle | 7 | 11 | 4 | .364 | 0 | 1 |
| Howie Bedell | 9 | 7 | 1 | .143 | 0 | 1 |

=== Pitching ===
==== Starting pitchers ====
Note: G = Games pitched; IP = Innings pitched; W = Wins; L = Losses; ERA = Earned run average; SO = Strikeouts

| Player | G | IP | W | L | ERA | SO |
|---|---|---|---|---|---|---|
| Chris Short | 42 | 269.2 | 19 | 13 | 2.94 | 202 |
| Larry Jackson | 34 | 243.2 | 13 | 17 | 2.77 | 127 |
| Woodie Fryman | 34 | 213.2 | 12 | 14 | 2.78 | 151 |
| Rick Wise | 30 | 182.1 | 9 | 15 | 4.54 | 97 |
| Jerry Johnson | 16 | 80.2 | 4 | 4 | 3.24 | 40 |

==== Other pitchers ====
Note: G = Games pitched; IP = Innings pitched; W = Wins; L = Losses; ERA = Earned run average; SO = Strikeouts

| Player | G | IP | W | L | ERA | SO |
|---|---|---|---|---|---|---|
| Jeff James | 29 | 115.2 | 4 | 4 | 4.28 | 83 |
| Grant Jackson | 33 | 61.0 | 1 | 6 | 2.95 | 49 |

==== Relief pitchers ====
Note: G = Games pitched; W = Wins; L = Losses; SV = Saves; ERA = Earned run average; SO = Strikeouts

| Player | G | W | L | SV | ERA | SO |
|---|---|---|---|---|---|---|
| Turk Farrell | 54 | 4 | 6 | 12 | 3.48 | 57 |
| Gary Wagner | 44 | 4 | 4 | 8 | 3.00 | 43 |
| John Boozer | 38 | 2 | 2 | 5 | 3.67 | 49 |
| Dick Hall | 32 | 4 | 1 | 0 | 4.89 | 31 |
| Paul Brown | 2 | 0 | 0 | 0 | 9.00 | 4 |
| Larry Colton | 1 | 0 | 0 | 0 | 4.50 | 2 |

== Farm system ==
| Level | Team | League | Manager |
|---|---|---|---|
| AAA | San Diego Padres | Pacific Coast League | Bob Skinner and Bobby Klaus |
| AA | Reading Phillies | Eastern League | Frank Lucchesi |
| A | Tidewater Tides | Carolina League | Bob Wellman |
| A | Spartanburg Phillies | Western Carolinas League | Bobby Malkmus |
| A-Short Season | Huron Phillies | Northern League | Dallas Green |
| A-Short Season | Eugene Emeralds | Northwest League | Nolan Campbell |

LEAGUE CHAMPIONS: Reading
