= John Boozer =

American baseball player (1938-1986)

- Pitcher
- Born: July 6, 1938; Columbia, South Carolina, U.S.
- Died: January 24, 1986 (aged 47); Lexington, South Carolina, U.S.
- Batted: Right Threw: Right

MLB debut
- July 22, 1962, for the Philadelphia Phillies

Last MLB appearance
- October 1, 1969, for the Philadelphia Phillies

MLB statistics
- Win–loss record: 14–16
- Earned run average: 4.09
- Strikeouts: 282
- Stats at Baseball Reference

Teams
- Philadelphia Phillies (1962–1964, 1966–1969)

John Morgan Boozer (July 6, 1938 – January 24, 1986) was an American Major League Baseball pitcher for the Philadelphia Phillies (1962–64 and 1966–69). Boozer has the distinction of being one of only four Major League Baseball players to be ejected from a game for violation of the spitball rule (the others were Nels Potter in 1944, Phil Regan later in 1968, and Gaylord Perry in 1982).

The ejection occurred on May 2, 1968, when Boozer, having entered the game for the Phillies in relief of Woody Fryman, with his team trailing 3–0 to the host New York Mets, repeatedly touched his fingers to his mouth during warm-ups for the bottom of the seventh inning. Home-plate umpire Ed Vargo gave Boozer two warnings, calling a ball to batter Bud Harrelson three times — the last resulting in the pitcher’s ejection, along with the ejection of Phillies manager Gene Mauch.

Boozer attended Wofford College and also played in the Puerto Rico Baseball Winter League in 1961, 1962, and 1963 with the Ponce Lions. He was teammates with Nelson Briles and Steve Carlton. He contributed to a championship for the Ponce Lions in 1963. He was popular among local fans as he was always joking and making fun of himself on and off the field. He entertained kids and dressed as a clown during an all-star game.

In seven Major League seasons, he tallied a 14–16 W–L record, 171 games pitched (22 as a starter — three of which he completed), a 4.09 ERA, and recorded 15 saves.

After retiring from baseball, Boozer returned to Lexington, South Carolina, where he founded the Lexington County Recreation & Aging Commission.

Boozer died in Lexington at the age of 47 from Hodgkin's disease. He is buried in the Pilgrim Lutheran Church Cemetery.
