= Dick Hughes (baseball) =

American baseball player (1938–2026)

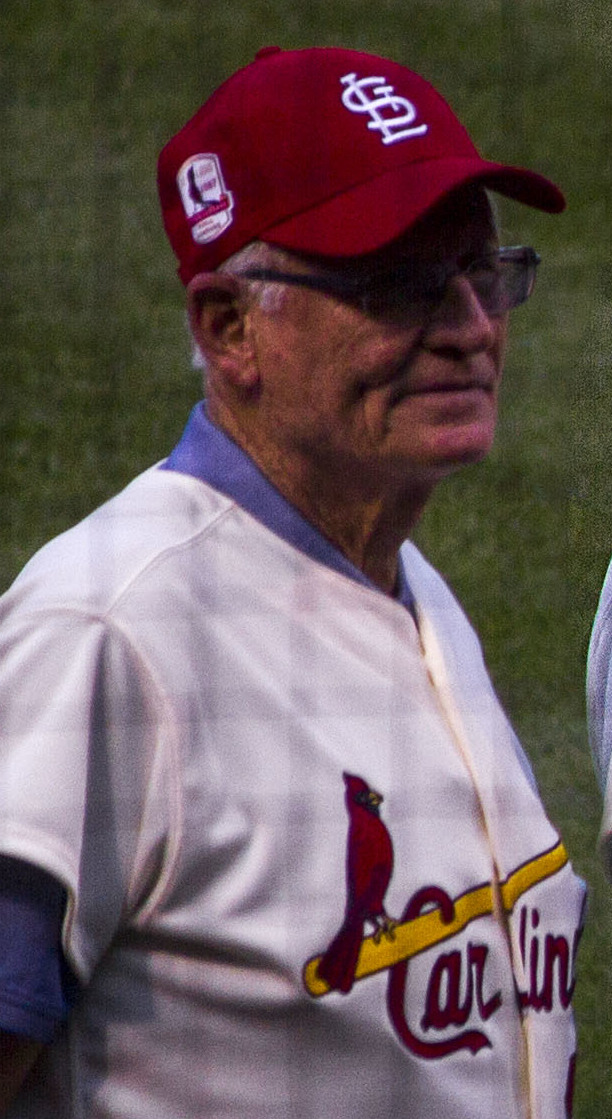
- Hughes in 2017
- Pitcher
- Born: February 13, 1938; Stephens, Arkansas, U.S.
- Died: May 6, 2026 (aged 88); Stephens, Arkansas, U.S.
- Batted: Right Threw: Right

MLB debut
- September 11, 1966, for the St. Louis Cardinals

Last MLB appearance
- September 28, 1968, for the St. Louis Cardinals

MLB statistics
- Win–loss record: 20–9
- Earned run average: 2.78
- Strikeouts: 230
- Stats at Baseball Reference

Teams
- St. Louis Cardinals (1966–1968)

Career highlights and awards
- World Series champion (1967)

Richard Henry Hughes (February 13, 1938 – May 6, 2026) was an American professional baseball player who pitched in three seasons for the St. Louis Cardinals of Major League Baseball (MLB). In his rookie year, 1967, he led the National League in WHIP (walks+hits per IP), and finished second to Tom Seaver in the National League Rookie of the Year voting.

== Biography ==
Hughes was born in Stephens, Arkansas, on February 13, 1938. His family moved to Shreveport, Louisiana, in 1946. Very near-sighted, he began wearing glasses in 7th grade, and learned for the first time that there were people who could see across the street. He graduated from C. E. Byrd High School in Shreveport in 1956, and pitched for the Byrd baseball team that won the AAA state championship. He played collegiate baseball on a scholarship at the University of Arkansas for two years before beginning his professional career in 1958.

Contrary to some reports, it was Nelson Briles, not Hughes, who replaced Bob Gibson in the starting rotation for the 1967 St. Louis Cardinals when Gibson suffered a fractured leg due to a Roberto Clemente line drive. Hughes actually replaced veteran left-hander Al Jackson in the Cardinals' rotation in late May, pitching a two-hit shutout against Atlanta in his first start of the season. He went on to win 16 games that year to lead the Redbirds.

In spring training of 1968, Hughes was warming up in the bullpen when he felt pain in his throwing shoulder. Though undiagnosed at the time, the injury was later determined to be a torn rotator cuff. At the time, there was no surgery to fix such an injury. Despite the injury, Hughes was able to pitch 63.2 innings during the 1968 season, but those were the last he would throw as the injury ultimately ended his major league career.

Hughes died on May 6, 2026, at the age of 88.
