= 1976 Major League Baseball All-Star Game =

1976 American baseball competition

	1	2	3	4	5	6	7	8	9	R	H	E
American League	0	0	0	1	0	0	0	0	0	1	5	0
National League	2	0	2	0	0	0	0	3	X	7	10	0
- Date: July 13, 1976
- Venue: Veterans Stadium
- City: Philadelphia, Pennsylvania
- Managers: Darrell Johnson (BOS); Sparky Anderson (CIN)
- MVP: George Foster (CIN)
- Attendance: 63,974
- Ceremonial first pitch: President Gerald Ford
- Television: ABC
- TV announcers: Bob Prince, Warner Wolf and Bob Uecker
- Radio: CBS
- Radio announcers: Jack Buck, Brent Musburger and Andy Musser

The 1976 Major League Baseball All-Star Game was the 47th midseason exhibition between the all-stars of the American League (AL) and the National League (NL), the two leagues comprising Major League Baseball. The game was played on July 13, 1976, at Veterans Stadium in Philadelphia, Pennsylvania, home of the Philadelphia Phillies of the National League. The game resulted in a 7–1 victory for the NL.

This was the third time that the All-Star Game had been played in Philadelphia, though the first to be played in Veteran's Stadium. Both the 1943 and 1952 games were played in Philadelphia's Shibe Park with the then Philadelphia Athletics hosting in 1943 and the Phillies hosting in 1952. The All-Star Game would return to Veterans Stadium in 1996.

The game was held to celebrate the 200th anniversary of the Signing of the United States Declaration of Independence. The 2026 Major League Baseball All-Star Game was also held in Philadelphia to mark the 250th anniversary.

The honorary captains were Robin Roberts (for the NL) and Bob Lemon (for the AL).

Starting with this All-Star Game, both "O Canada" and "The Star-Spangled Banner" would be sung as part of the annual pregame ceremonies.

== American League roster ==
The American League roster included 7 future Hall of Fame players, denoted in italics.

=== Elected starters ===
Position	Player	Team	Notes
C	Thurman Munson	New York Yankees
1B	Rod Carew	Minnesota Twins
2B	Bobby Grich	Baltimore Orioles
3B	George Brett	Kansas City Royals
SS	Toby Harrah	Texas Rangers
OF	Ron LeFlore	Detroit Tigers
OF	Fred Lynn	Boston Red Sox
OF	Rusty Staub	Detroit Tigers

=== Pitchers ===
Throws	Pitcher	Team	Notes
RH	Mark Fidrych	Detroit Tigers	starting pitcher
RH	Rollie Fingers	Oakland Athletics	did not pitch
RH	Goose Gossage	Chicago White Sox	did not pitch
RH	Catfish Hunter	New York Yankees
LH	Dave LaRoche	Cleveland Indians	did not pitch
LH	Sparky Lyle	New York Yankees	did not pitch
LH	Frank Tanana	California Angels
RH	Luis Tiant	Boston Red Sox
LH	Bill Travers	Milwaukee Brewers	did not pitch

=== Reserve position players ===
Position	Player	Team	Notes
C	Carlton Fisk	Boston Red Sox
C	Butch Wynegar	Minnesota Twins
1B	Chris Chambliss	New York Yankees
2B	Phil Garner	Oakland Athletics
2B	Willie Randolph	New York Yankees	injured
3B	Don Money	Milwaukee Brewers
SS	Mark Belanger	Baltimore Orioles
SS	Freddie Patek	Kansas City Royals
OF	Hal McRae	Kansas City Royals
OF	Amos Otis	Kansas City Royals
OF	Mickey Rivers	New York Yankees
OF	Carl Yastrzemski	Boston Red Sox

=== Coaching staff ===
Position	Manager	Team
Manager	Darrell Johnson	Boston Red Sox
Coach	Gene Mauch	Minnesota Twins
Coach	Frank Robinson	Cleveland Indians

== National League roster ==
The National League roster included 5 future Hall of Fame players, denoted in italics.

=== Elected starters ===
Position	Player	Team	Notes
C	Johnny Bench	Cincinnati Reds
1B	Steve Garvey	Los Angeles Dodgers
2B	Joe Morgan	Cincinnati Reds
3B	Pete Rose	Cincinnati Reds
SS	Dave Concepción	Cincinnati Reds
OF	George Foster	Cincinnati Reds
OF	Dave Kingman	New York Mets
OF	Greg Luzinski	Philadelphia Phillies

=== Pitchers ===
Throws	Pitcher	Team	Notes
RH	Ken Forsch	Houston Astros
LH	Woodie Fryman	Montreal Expos	did not pitch
LH	Randy Jones	San Diego Padres	starting pitcher
LH	Jon Matlack	New York Mets	did not pitch
RH	Andy Messersmith	Atlanta Braves	injured
RH	John Montefusco	San Francisco Giants
RH	Rick Rhoden	Los Angeles Dodgers
RH	Dick Ruthven	Atlanta Braves	did not pitch
RH	Tom Seaver	New York Mets

=== Reserve position players ===
Position	Player	Team	Notes
C	Bob Boone	Philadelphia Phillies
C	Steve Swisher	Chicago Cubs	did not play
1B	Tony Pérez	Cincinnati Reds
2B	Dave Cash	Philadelphia Phillies
3B	Ron Cey	Los Angeles Dodgers
3B	Mike Schmidt	Philadelphia Phillies
SS	Larry Bowa	Philadelphia Phillies
SS	Bill Russell	Los Angeles Dodgers
OF	César Cedeño	Houston Astros
OF	Ken Griffey	Cincinnati Reds
OF	Bake McBride	St. Louis Cardinals	did not play
OF	Al Oliver	Pittsburgh Pirates

=== Coaching staff ===
Position	Manager	Team
Manager	Sparky Anderson	Cincinnati Reds
Coach	John McNamara	San Diego Padres
Coach	Danny Ozark	Philadelphia Phillies

== Starting lineups ==
While the starters were elected by the fans, the batting orders and starting pitchers were selected by the managers.

American League				National League			
Order	Player	Team	Position	Order	Player	Team	Position
1	Ron LeFlore	Detroit Tigers	LF	1	Pete Rose	Cincinnati Reds	3B
2	Rod Carew	Minnesota Twins	1B	2	Steve Garvey	Los Angeles Dodgers	1B
3	George Brett	Kansas City Royals	3B	3	Joe Morgan	Cincinnati Reds	2B
4	Thurman Munson	New York Yankees	C	4	George Foster	Cincinnati Reds	CF
5	Fred Lynn	Boston Red Sox	CF	5	Greg Luzinski	Philadelphia Phillies	LF
6	Toby Harrah	Texas Rangers	SS	6	Johnny Bench	Cincinnati Reds	C
7	Rusty Staub	Detroit Tigers	RF	7	Dave Kingman	New York Mets	RF
8	Bobby Grich	Baltimore Orioles	2B	8	Dave Concepción	Cincinnati Reds	SS
9	Mark Fidrych	Detroit Tigers	P	9	Randy Jones	San Diego Padres	P

== Umpires ==
Position	Umpire
Home Plate	Harry Wendelstedt (NL)
First Base	Jerry Neudecker (AL)
Second Base	Andy Olsen (NL)
Third Base	Don Denkinger (AL)
Left Field	Satch Davidson (NL)
Right Field	Jim Evans (AL)

== Scoring summary ==
Following the pattern of many of the previous All-Star Games, the NL scored first and early, putting up two runs in the bottom of the first inning. Pete Rose led off with a single, and scored when the next batter, Steve Garvey, tripled. After Joe Morgan flew out, George Foster grounded out, allowing Garvey to score from third base.

The National League added two more runs in the bottom of the third inning, with Catfish Hunter pitching in relief. With one out, Joe Morgan singled. George Foster then hit a home run, scoring Morgan to bring the NL lead to 4–0.

The lone AL run came in the top of the third inning, with Tom Seaver pitching for the NL in relief of Randy Jones. With two outs, Fred Lynn hit a home run to reduce the NL lead to 4–1.

The game's scoring was closed out in the bottom of the eighth, as the NL scored three runs off of AL relief pitcher Frank Tanana. Dave Cash led off with a single, and went to second base when Tony Pérez walked. Bill Russell grounded into a 5–4–3 double play, with Pérez out at second base, Russell out at first base, but Cash advancing to third base. Ken Griffey singled, scoring Cash. César Cedeño then hit a home run, scoring Griffey, and giving the NL a 7–1 lead that would hold up as the final score.

=== Line score ===
Tuesday, July 13, 1976 8:15 pm (ET) at Veterans Stadium in Philadelphia, Pennsylvania
Team	1	2	3	4	5	6	7	8	9	R	H	E
American League	0	0	0	1	0	0	0	0	0	1	5	0
National League	2	0	2	0	0	0	0	3	X	7	10	0
WP: Randy Jones (1-0) LP: Mark Fidrych (0-1); Home runs: AL: Fred Lynn (1); NL: George Foster (1), César Cedeño (1)

== Game notes and records ==
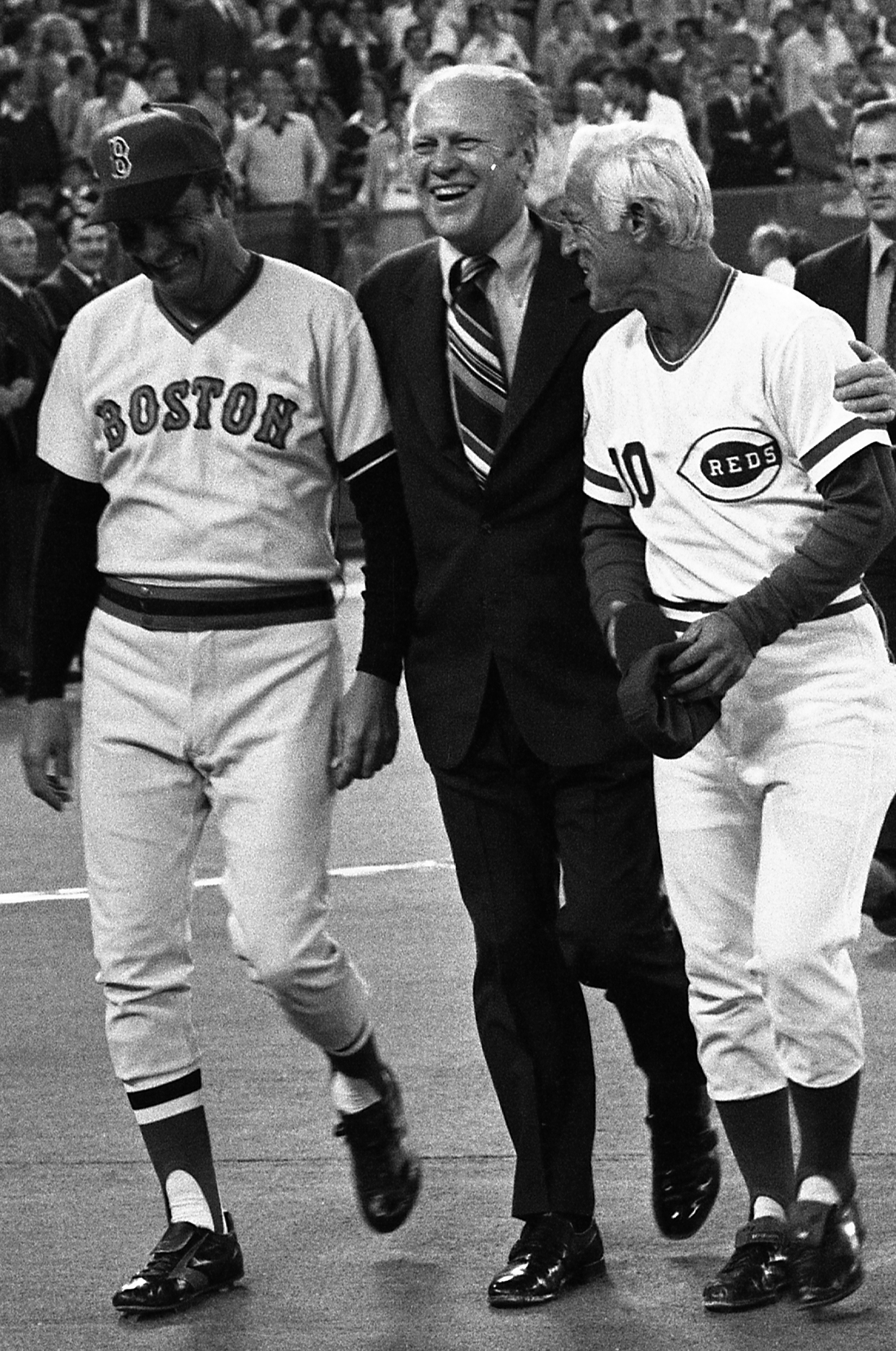
U.S. President Gerald Ford (seen with AL manager Darrell Johnson and NL manager Sparky Anderson) attended the game and threw out the ceremonial first pitch.

Randy Jones was credited with the win. Mark Fidrych was credited with the loss.

Mark Fidrych was only the second rookie to ever start as a pitcher in an All-Star Game (Dave Stenhouse had started the second All-Star Game of 1962).

The five Cincinnati Reds selected by the fans to start the game, and the two reserves selected by manager Sparky Anderson combined for seven hits, four runs scored, and four runs batted in.

As part of the United States Bicentennial observances, the city of Philadelphia – site of the Continental Congress and the signing of the Declaration of Independence – was selected to host the 1976 NBA All-Star Game, the 1976 National Hockey League All-Star Game, and the 1976 NCAA Final Four in addition to the 1976 Major League Baseball All-Star Game.
