= Rick Rhoden =

American baseball player (born 1953)

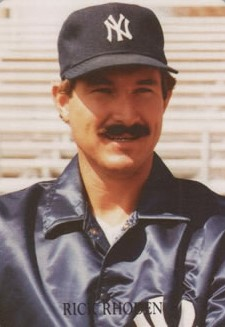
- Pitcher
- Born: May 16, 1953 (age 73); Boynton Beach, Florida, U.S.
- Batted: Right Threw: Right

MLB debut
- July 5, 1974, for the Los Angeles Dodgers

Last MLB appearance
- September 29, 1989, for the Houston Astros

MLB statistics
- Win–loss record: 151–125
- Earned run average: 3.59
- Strikeouts: 1,419
- Stats at Baseball Reference

Teams
- Los Angeles Dodgers (1974–1978); Pittsburgh Pirates (1979–1986); New York Yankees (1987–1988); Houston Astros (1989)

Career highlights and awards
- 2× All-Star (1976, 1986); 3× Silver Slugger Award (1984–1986)

Richard Alan Rhoden (born May 16, 1953) is an American professional golfer and former Major League Baseball (MLB) pitcher. During his 16-year baseball career, he played for the Los Angeles Dodgers (1974–1978), the Pittsburgh Pirates (1979–1986), the New York Yankees (1987–1988), and the Houston Astros (1989).

== Early life ==
Rhoden was born and raised in Boynton Beach, Florida. Rhoden overcame a childhood bone disease, osteomyelitis, and he wore a brace until age 12. He attended Seacrest High School in Delray Beach, Florida, where he was the star pitcher for the school's baseball team.

== Baseball career ==
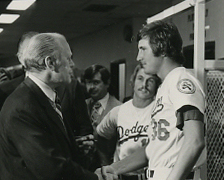
Rhoden (right) with Gerald Ford at the 1976 Major League Baseball All-Star Game

The Los Angeles Dodgers selected Rhoden in the first round of the 1971 Major League Baseball draft. He played Minor League Baseball with the Daytona Beach Dodgers, El Paso Dodgers, and Albuquerque Dukes from 1971 to 1974.

At the age of 21, Rhoden broke into the big leagues with the Los Angeles Dodgers on July 5, 1974. He was elected to the All-Star team twice (1976 with the Dodgers and 1986 with the Pirates) and won three Silver Slugger Awards (1984–1986). His teams made it to the postseason twice during his career, both with the Dodgers in 1977 and 1978. In both of those years, the Dodgers reached the World Series against the New York Yankees but lost in six games each year.

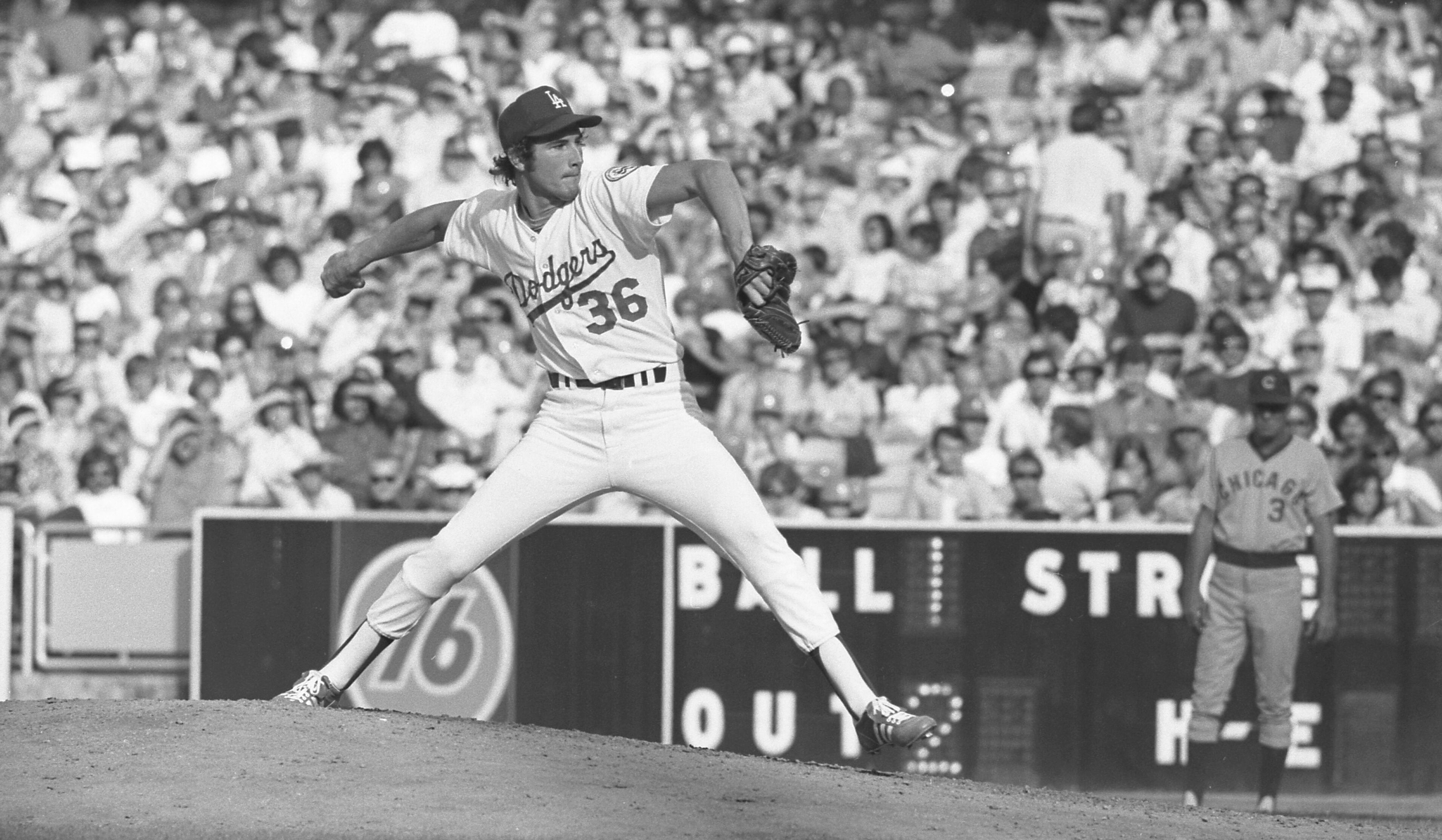
Rhoden pitching for the Dodgers in a 1976 game

Rhoden appeared in 413 major league games and was mostly a starting pitcher (380 games started). However, on April 17, 1983, he picked up his one and only major league save. Rhoden pitched the final 3 innings of a Pirates 7-0 victory over the Cubs, allowing 1 hit and no runs. He saved the game for starting pitcher John Candelaria.

Rhoden earned a reputation as an outstanding hitting pitcher. He had an eleven-game hitting streak in 1984, one of the longest all-time for a pitcher. On June 11, 1988, New York Yankees manager Billy Martin made him the Yankees' starting designated hitter, and he went 0–1 with an RBI on a sacrifice fly. He batted seventh in the lineup, ahead of Rafael Santana and Joel Skinner. He was the first pitcher to start a game at DH since the AL's adoption of the DH rule in 1973. José Cruz pinch hit for Rhoden in the Yankees' 8–6 victory over the Baltimore Orioles.

Rhoden's final game was September 29, 1989, for the Houston Astros. In 413 career games, Rhoden compiled a 151–125 record, a 3.59 ERA, 1,419 strikeouts, and 1 save. Rhoden batted .238 with 9 home runs and 75 RBI. He also was an excellent fielding pitcher, compiling a career .989 fielding percentage, committing only six errors in 565 total chances.

== Golf career ==
Since retiring from baseball in 1989, Rhoden has spent a lot of time on the golf course. He has qualified for the U.S. Senior Open and has become a dominant player on the Celebrity Players Tour.

Rhoden has also played a number of Champions Tour events and has three career top 10 finishes: T-5 in the 2003 Allianz Championship, T-6 in the 2006 3M Championship, and T-8 in the 2005 Constellation Energy Classic. His career earnings on the Champions Tour exceed $250,000. He became conditionally exempt for the 2006 season. Rhoden's 2007 season was scuttled due to neck surgery, forcing him into the Tour's 2007 qualifying school. He finished joint first place over the four-day event, earning him a spot into open qualifiers at all regular Champions Tour events in 2008.

Rhoden is a regular competitor at the American Century Championship, the annual competition to determine the best golfers among American sports and entertainment celebrities. He won the tournament in 1991, 1993, 1995, 1997, 1999, 2003, 2008, and 2009, and he has a total of 22 top 10 finishes. The tournament, televised by NBC in July, is played at Edgewood Tahoe Golf Course in Lake Tahoe, Nevada.
