= Rick Joseph =

Dominican baseball player (1939-1979)

Ricardo Joseph
- Third baseman / First baseman
- Born: August 24, 1939; San Pedro de Macorís, Dominican Republic
- Died: September 8, 1979 (aged 40); Santo Domingo, Dominican Republic
- Batted: Right Threw: Right

MLB debut
- June 18, 1964, for the Kansas City Athletics

Last MLB appearance
- September 23, 1970, for the Philadelphia Phillies

MLB statistics
- Batting average: .243
- Home runs: 13
- Runs batted in: 65
- Stats at Baseball Reference

Teams
- Kansas City Athletics (1964); Philadelphia Phillies (1967–1970)

Ricardo Emelindo Joseph Harrigan (August 24, 1939 – September 8, 1979) was a Dominican professional baseball corner infielder, who played in Major League Baseball (MLB) for the Kansas City Athletics and the Philadelphia Phillies in all or parts of five seasons (1964–1970).

Born in San Pedro de Macorís, Joseph stood 6 feet 1 inch (1.85 m) tall and weighed 192 pounds (87 kg). He batted and threw right-handed.

== Baseball career ==
Originally signed by the San Francisco Giants, Joseph played in their minor league system from 1959 to 1963, batting .320, .319, and .326, respectively, in his first three seasons. On December 2, 1963, he was drafted by the Kansas City Athletics in the 1963 minor league draft.

Joseph made his big league debut with the Athletics on June 18, 1964. On November 29, 1966, he was drafted by the Philadelphia Phillies in the 1966 minor league draft. The Phillies sent him to their San Diego Padres farm team. There, in 1967, Joseph received the Most Valuable Player Award of the Triple-A Pacific Coast League (PCL), after batting .300 with 24 home runs for the league champion Padres. The performance earned him an August 31 call-up to the Phillies.

On September 16, 1967, against the Los Angeles Dodgers, he hit his first MLB home run, a pinch-hit, walk-off grand slam off Ron Perranoski to give the Phillies an 8-4 win. Through 2019, Joseph is the last MLB player to hit a walk-off grand slam for his first career home run.

After playing the next three seasons with Philadelphia as a utility player, Joseph became expendable when emerging young players such as Don Money and Greg Luzinski, as well as veteran Deron Johnson began to signal a changing of the guard. As such, on January 12, 1971, he was traded by the Philadelphia Phillies to the Chicago White Sox for pitcher Bucky Brandon. Joseph would play the next three years for several minor league and Mexican League teams, never again playing in the major leagues.

Joseph died in 1979 of complications from diabetes.
