= Larry Colton =

American baseball player (born 1942)

- Pitcher
- Born: June 8, 1942; Los Angeles California, U.S.
- Batted: Left Threw: Right

MLB debut
- May 6, 1968, for the Philadelphia Phillies

Last MLB appearance
- May 6, 1968, for the Philadelphia Phillies

MLB statistics
- Games played: 1
- Innings pitched: 2
- Earned runs: 1
- Earned run average: 4.50
- Stats at Baseball Reference

Teams
- Philadelphia Phillies (1968)

Lawrence Robert Colton (born June 8, 1942), a one-time professional baseball player, is an American writer and educator in Portland, Oregon, United States. He played as a pitcher for the Philadelphia Phillies in 1968; a shoulder separation ended his career.

== Baseball career ==
Colton attended Westchester High School in Los Angeles, California, now Westchester Enriched Sciences Magnets, and signed as a pitcher by the Philadelphia Phillies as an undrafted free agent in 1964 after playing college ball at the University of California, where he holds the single game strikeout record (19). Colton played for the Philadelphia Phillies in 1968. He played for Phillies farm team the Eugene Emeralds in 1965 when it was a Class A-Short Season Northwest League team and again in 1969 when it was a triple-A Pacific Coast League team. A shoulder separation ended his big league career after a single appearance in relief for the Phillies.

== Writing career ==
Larry Colton has published hundreds of magazine articles for publications including Esquire, New York Times, Sports Illustrated and Ladies Home Journal. Colton was the recipient of the 2013 Stewart H. Holbrook Literary Legacy Oregon Book Award from Oregon Literary Arts, for his achievements as a writer and his role in founding Wordstock, literary festival and writing program.

=== Idol Time ===
Colton's first book, Idol Time, examines the aftermath of the Portland Trail Blazers' 1977 NBA championship, and although it reached primarily a regional audience, it foreshadowed the narrative approach Colton would apply in subsequent works.

=== Goat Brothers ===
Colton's 1993 book Goat Brothers examined the lives of Colton and a select group of his fraternity brothers at the University of California from their college days in the early 1960s until the end of the 1980s. Goat Brothers was well received, with Publishers Weekly saying that it "powerfully tells the stories of the five men's search for self-worth, their difficulty in communicating their feelings, and their anger toward women."

=== Counting Coup ===
Colton's third book, Counting Coup, chronicled a dramatic season of a high school girls' basketball team in Montana that was competing for a state championship. The book received mostly positive reviews. Katherine Dunn, author of Geek Love, observed that Colton placed his subjects "in the intricately tangled social contexts that lend weight and meaning far beyond the game." Counting Coup won the 2000 International E-Book of the Year Award, and the Frankfurt eBook Award in non-fiction in 2000.

=== No Ordinary Joes ===
No Ordinary Joes is Colton's 2010 account of the sinking of the US Navy submarine USS Grenadier, a little-known episode of World War II. The book is based on interviews with several of the survivors, and tells the interlocking stories of four shipmates on the Grenadier, from their childhoods through enlistment, courtships and deployment, and on to the horrors of life in a Japanese slave labor camp. The book received mainly positive reviews for its narrative and storytelling.

=== Southern League ===
Colton's 2013 book Southern League tells the story of the 1964 Birmingham Barons, the first integrated professional baseball team in Alabama, in the context of the Civil Rights Movement and the struggle for racial equality. The explores both the pennant race and Birmingham's complicated racial past, and the team's relationship with its young manager, Haywood Sullivan, a white Alabamian who went on to own the Boston Red Sox. Richard Ben Cramer wrote of Southern League: "When I read Counting Coup, I was staggered by Larry Colton's ability to persuade a group of high school girls to share their heart's secrets, so I am not surprised that for Southern League he could get a bunch of aging baseball players to remember the hopes and fears of their minor league days. The breadth of Colton's reporting here, placing the Birmingham Barons' 1964 season squarely into the context of the civil rights era, is a narrative tour de force."

== Personal life ==
In 1965, Colton married Denise Loder, daughter of the actress Hedy Lamarr. He has been married a total of four times. He has a daughter from his marriage to Loder, and a daughter from his marriage to Katherine Jeffcott. Colton has three grandchildren.
