= Jeff James (baseball) =

American baseball player (1941–2006)

Jeffrey James
- Pitcher
- Born: September 29, 1941; Indianapolis, Indiana, U.S.
- Died: May 7, 2006 (aged 64); Indianapolis, Indiana, U.S.
- Batted: Right Threw: Right

MLB debut
- April 13, 1968, for the Philadelphia Phillies

Last MLB appearance
- October 1, 1969, for the Philadelphia Phillies

MLB statistics
- Win–loss record: 6–6
- Earned run average: 4.52
- Innings pitched: 147 1/3
- Stats at Baseball Reference

Teams
- Philadelphia Phillies (1968–1969)

Jeffrey "Jesse" Lynn James (September 29, 1941 – May 7, 2006) was an American professional baseball pitcher. He played in Major League Baseball (MLB) from 1968–1969, for the Philadelphia Phillies. James appeared in 35 career games, winning six, including one shutout (versus the Chicago Cubs on July 17, 1968). He threw and batted right-handed.

A native of Indianapolis, Indiana, James graduated from Indianapolis Washington High School, where he was named to the "All-Time Washington High baseball team”; he went on to attend Indiana State University, lettering in baseball in 1959.

James had three children, two from his first marriage to Linda Donnelly. Kimberly Lynne was born in 1966 and Kelly Lynne was born in 1968. Jeff Jr., his third child, was born during his second marriage. James Sr. contracted lung cancer and died from the illness in 2006.
