= Don Money =

American baseball player (born 1947)

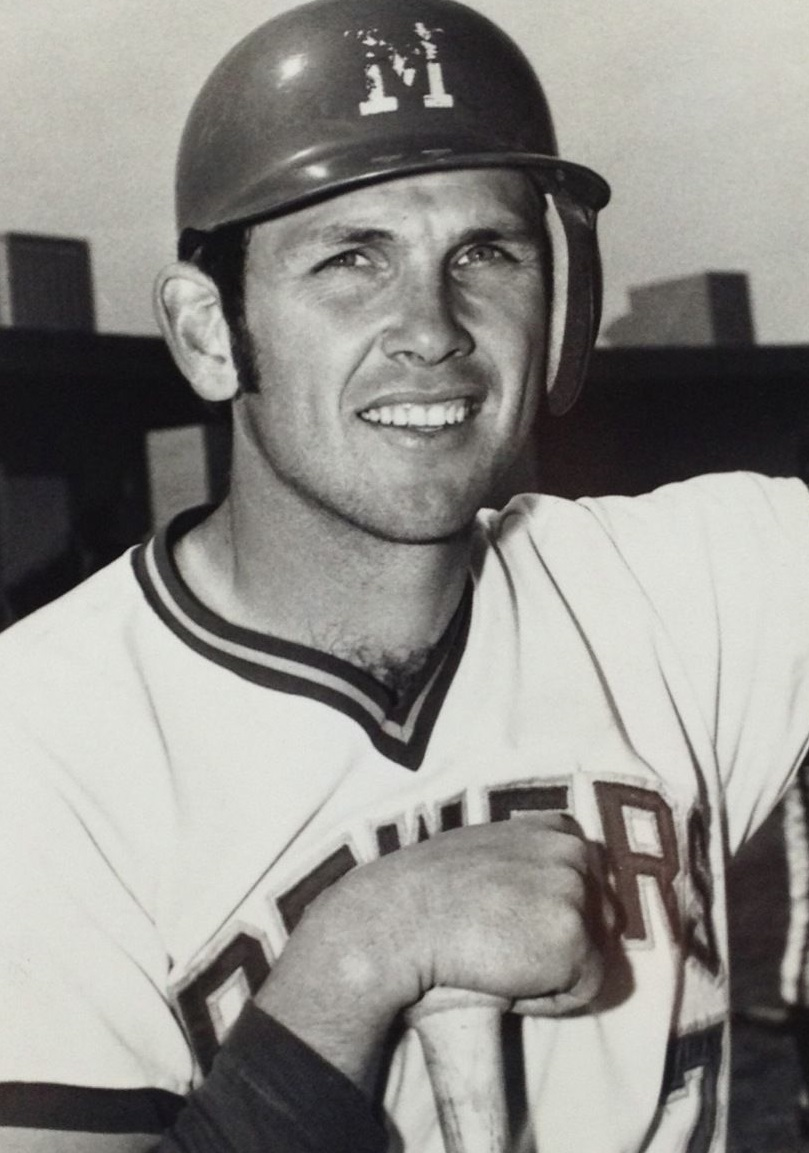
- Money in 1975
- Third baseman
- Born: June 7, 1947 (age 79); Washington, D.C., U.S.
- Batted: Right Threw: Right

Professional debut
- MLB: April 10, 1968, for the Philadelphia Phillies
- NPB: March 31, 1984, for the Kintetsu Buffaloes

Last appearance
- MLB: September 17, 1983, for the Milwaukee Brewers
- NPB: May 6, 1984, for the Kintetsu Buffaloes

MLB statistics
- Batting average: .261
- Home runs: 176
- Runs batted in: 729

NPB statistics
- Batting average: .260
- Home runs: 8
- Runs batted in: 23
- Stats at Baseball Reference

Teams
- Philadelphia Phillies (1968–1972); Milwaukee Brewers (1973–1983); Kintetsu Buffaloes (1984)

Career highlights and awards
- 4× All-Star (1974, 1976–1978); Milwaukee Brewers Wall of Honor; American Family Field Walk of Fame

Donald Wayne Money (born June 7, 1947) is an American former professional baseball infielder who played in Major League Baseball (MLB) for the Philadelphia Phillies and Milwaukee Brewers, and in Nippon Professional Baseball (NPB) for the Kintetsu Buffaloes. He currently serves as the Brewers' special instructor of player development.

Money spent most of his big league career as a third baseman and was a four-time All-Star. Known as one of the best defensive third basemen of the era, he batted and threw right-handed. He played for MLB's Phillies from (1968–1972) and Brewers (1973–1983). Money played for NPB's Buffaloes in Japan for one month at the end of his career.

== Playing career ==
Money was originally signed by the Pittsburgh Pirates as an amateur free agent in 1965 out of La Plata High School in southern Maryland. While still in the minors, the Pirates traded him in 1967 to the Philadelphia Phillies (with Harold Clem, Woodie Fryman and Bill Laxton) for Jim Bunning. Called up by the Phillies in 1968, he began his major league career as a shortstop, but was moved to third base when Larry Bowa was called up by the Phillies. With the Phillies looking to make room for Mike Schmidt, Money was part of a seven-player deal that sent him, John Vukovich and Bill Champion to the Brewers for Jim Lonborg, Ken Brett, Ken Sanders and Earl Stephenson on October 31, 1972.

Money's most productive seasons were those in 1974, 1977, and 1978 while playing for the Milwaukee Brewers. In 1974, he set career-highs in hits (178), doubles (32), and at bats (629). He also had 19 stolen bases and made his first All-Star team. In 1977, he had career-highs in home runs (25), Runs batted in (83), slugging percentage (.470), and total bases (268). He also had 86 runs scored and made his third All-Star Game. In 1978, he had career-highs in batting average (.293), on-base percentage (.361), and sacrifice hits (14). He also had 7 hit by pitches, and made his fourth and final All-Star team, becoming the first All-Star starter in Brewers franchise history.

Late in his career, Money finally made the post-season with the Milwaukee Brewers in 1981. Because of a prolonged strike, Major League Baseball chose to have a split-season format. In the American League Eastern Division, the first-half champion New York Yankees played Milwaukee, the second half champion. Money, having his worst major league season to date, only had three plate appearances as the Brewers lost the series to New York, 3 games to 2. He saw more action the following postseason as the Brewers defeated the California Angels in the American League Championship Series. In his only World Series of his career, Money and the Brewers lost in seven games to the St. Louis Cardinals in 1982. He had a .185 batting average in the 1982 post-season, and a .231 average in the World Series, picking up 2 playoff RBI all-time.

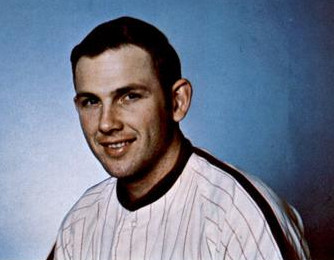
Money, circa 1972

In a 16-season career, Money hit .261 with 176 home runs and 729 RBIs in 1,720 games. He had a lifetime on-base percentage of .328 and a .406 slugging percentage. He also had 80 career stolen bases with 798 runs. He had 1,623 hits in 6,215 at bats.

In 1971, he hit the first ever home run at Veterans Stadium on April 10.

On July 7, 1974, he set the major league record for errorless games at third base, with 78. He would go on to complete an 86-game streak with no errors in 257 chances.

On April 10, 1976, Money hit a walk-off grand slam off Dave Pagan of the New York Yankees, only to see it taken back because the first base umpire had called time before the pitch was delivered. According to most accounts, the time out was only granted after the home run, when Yankees manager Billy Martin appealed to the umpire that he had discreetly asked for time out.

After retiring from MLB, he contracted with the Kintetsu Buffaloes in the Japanese Professional League. Money had watched many games of the Yomiuri Giants and noted the large crowds and their beautiful stadium. Kintetsu had a dilapidated stadium, however, and rarely drew much of a crowd. The team put Money up in a cockroach-ridden apartment rather than a house in a tree-lined setting as he felt he had been promised. After one month, Money packed up his family and moved back to his farm in Vineland, New Jersey. As a result of Money's defection — as well as those of two other American players at the time, Jim Tracy and Richard Duran — the NPB commissioner at the time called the American players "spoiled," and proposed banning non-Japanese players from the NPB, a threat that was never carried out.

== Coaching career ==
Money began his minor league coaching career as manager of the Class A Oneonta Tigers from 1987 to 1988. He became manager of the Class A Beloit Snappers in 1998. After seven years at Beloit, he moved up to the Brewers' Double-A affiliate, the Huntsville Stars in 2005. In 2007, Money was named the Southern League's Manager of the Year as voted upon by the league's field managers, radio broadcasters, and print media. On May 14, 2008, he became the winningest manager in Stars' history; he finished the season with 275 victories. Money managed the Nashville Sounds, Milwaukee's Triple-A club, from 2009 to 2011. Following the 2011 season, he became Milwaukee's special instructor of player development.

== Brewers Walk of Fame ==
In 2005, Money was inducted into the Milwaukee Brewers Walk of Fame at American Family Field. He was inducted along with one of his former Brewers managers, Harvey Kuenn. Money said that his induction was "the greatest honor of all" of his baseball career.

== Personal life ==
Money's grandson, Buddy Kennedy, has also played in MLB.
