= Luis Tiant =

Cuban baseball player (1940–2024)

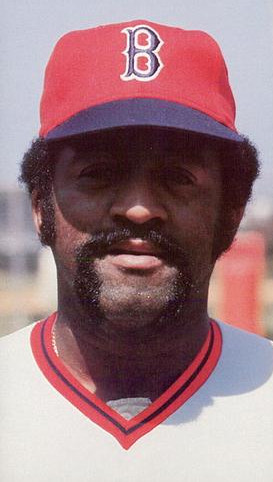
- Tiant with the Boston Red Sox in 1976
- Pitcher
- Born: November 23, 1940; Marianao, Cuba
- Died: October 8, 2024 (aged 83); Wells, Maine, U.S.
- Batted: Right Threw: Right

MLB debut
- July 19, 1964, for the Cleveland Indians

Last MLB appearance
- September 4, 1982, for the California Angels

MLB statistics
- Win–loss record: 229–172
- Earned run average: 3.30
- Strikeouts: 2,416
- Stats at Baseball Reference

Teams
- Cleveland Indians (1964–1969); Minnesota Twins (1970); Boston Red Sox (1971–1978); New York Yankees (1979–1980); Pittsburgh Pirates (1981); California Angels (1982)

Career highlights and awards
- 3× All-Star (1968, 1974, 1976); 2× AL ERA leader (1968, 1972); Boston Red Sox Hall of Fame

Member of the Venezuelan

Baseball Hall of Fame
- Induction: 2009

Luis Clemente Tiant Vega (Spanish pronunciation: [ˈlwis ˈtjant]) (November 23, 1940 – October 8, 2024), nicknamed "El Tiante", was a Cuban professional baseball pitcher who played in Major League Baseball (MLB) for 19 years, primarily for the Cleveland Indians and the Boston Red Sox.

Tiant compiled a 229–172 record with 2,416 strikeouts, a 3.30 earned run average (ERA), 187 complete games, and 49 shutouts (the most of any pitcher not elected to the Hall of Fame) in 3486 1/3 innings. He was an All-Star for three seasons and 20-game winner for four seasons. He was the American League (AL) ERA leader in 1968 and 1972. He also was the AL leader in strikeouts per nine innings pitched in 1967 and the AL leader in shutouts in 1966, 1968, and 1974.

Tiant was inducted to the Boston Red Sox Hall of Fame in 1997, the Hispanic Heritage Baseball Museum Hall of Fame in 2002, the Venezuelan Baseball Hall of Fame and Museum in 2009, and the Baseball Reliquary's Shrine of the Eternals in 2012. He was considered for election to the National Baseball Hall of Fame via voting of the Baseball Writers' Association of America from 1988 to 2002, and by the Hall of Fame's era committees in 2011, 2014, 2017, and 2025, falling short of the required votes for induction each time.

== Early years ==
Tiant was the only child of Luis Tiant Sr. and Isabel Vega. From 1926 through 1948, the senior Tiant was a great left-handed pitcher for the Negro league's New York Cubans during the summer and the Cuban professional league's Cienfuegos in the winter, his heroics being followed by hundreds of thousands of Cubans. Luis Jr. followed in his father's footsteps at an early age, joining both the local Little and Juvenile baseball leagues and rising to a star.

=== Cuba and Mexico ===
The 16 year-old Tiant was picked for the Cuban Juvenile League All-Star team in 1957. His talent drew the attention of former Cleveland Indians All-Star Bobby Ávila, who was scouting for talent in Cuba. Avila recommended him to the Mexico City Tigers of the Mexican League. Tiant was signed in 1959 for $150 a month, and for the next three years he divided his time between the Tigers and the Havana Sugar Kings in the International League.

=== Cleveland Indians system ===
At the end of the summer of 1961, and under Avila's recommendation, Cleveland purchased Tiant's contract for $35,000. But with the rise of Fidel Castro's regime in his native Cuba—specifically, after heightened tensions following the U.S.-sponsored Bay of Pigs invasion in April of that year—it was impossible for Tiant to return home. He did not see his parents for 14 years.

Tiant progressed through the Indians' farm system beginning in 1962 with the Charleston Indians of the Eastern League, then with the Burlington Rangers—where he was one of the best pitchers in the Carolina League—in 1963, and lastly with the Portland Beavers of the Pacific Coast League in 1964. Tiant later recalled that at Charleston, "I couldn't speak very good English but I understand racism. They treated me like a dog, but when I got to Portland, I didn't have any problems." After pitching to a 15–1 record at Triple-A Portland, which included a no-hitter and a one-hitter in consecutive starts, Tiant was called up by the Indians in mid-July 1964.

== MLB career ==
=== Cleveland Indians ===
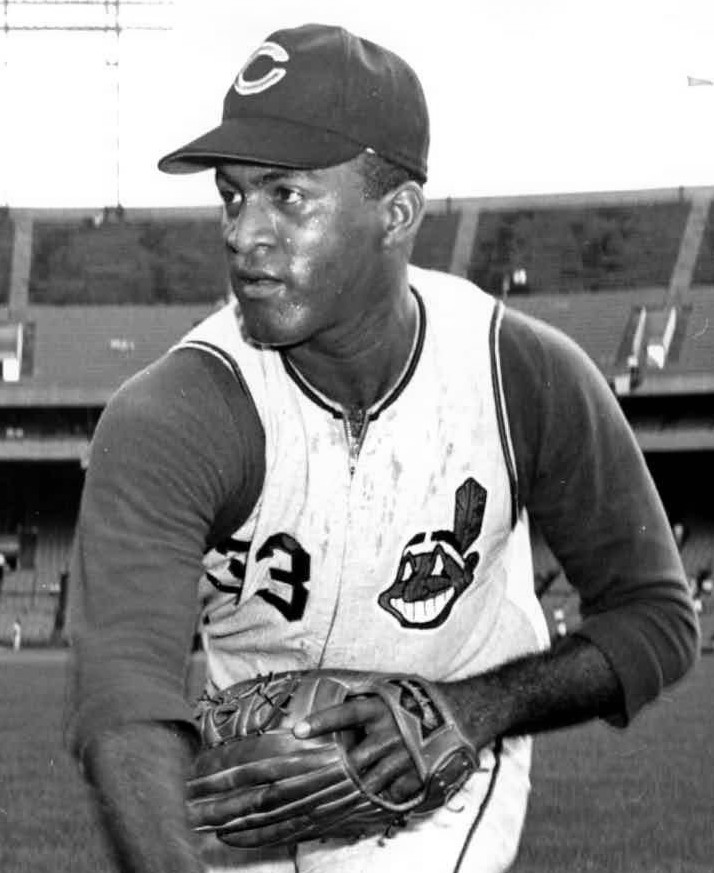
Tiant in April 1965

On July 19, 1964, Tiant debuted in Major League Baseball for the Cleveland Indians with a four-single, 11 strikeout, 3–0 shutout victory against the defending AL Champion New York Yankees at Yankee Stadium, beating their ace, Whitey Ford. Tiant finished his rookie season with a 10–4 win–loss record, 105 strikeouts, and a 2.83 earned run average (ERA) in 19 games.

In 1968, Tiant had one of the greatest pitching seasons in major league history, leading the American League in ERA (1.60), shutouts (nine, including four consecutive), hits per nine innings (a still-standing franchise record 5.30, which broke Herb Score's 5.85 in 1956 and would be a Major-League record until surpassed by Nolan Ryan's 5.26 in 1972), and strikeouts per nine innings (9.22), while finishing with a 21–9 mark. His .168 opponent batting average set a new major league record, and his 19 strikeout/10 inning performance against the Minnesota Twins on July 3 set the American League record for strikeouts in a game. His 1.60 ERA in 1968 was the lowest in the AL in nearly half a century (since Walter Johnson's dead-ball era 1.49 in 1919), second only in the Major Leagues in that time to National Leaguer (St. Louis Cardinals) Bob Gibson's historic 1.12 the same year—the lowest mark ever during the live-ball era. And his four consecutive shutouts had been matched or bettered by only two other pitchers in the 50-year expansion era, both also in 1968: Don Drysdale (six) and Gibson again (five).

With Sam McDowell, Sonny Siebert, and others, the Indians staff led the AL in strikeouts for five consecutive years, including a record 1189 in 1967, a mark which would stand for 30 years.

=== Minnesota Twins ===
After an injury-plagued season with the Indians in 1969, Tiant was traded to the Minnesota Twins in a multi-player deal that brought fellow pitcher Dean Chance and third baseman Graig Nettles to the Indians. With Minnesota, Tiant began 1970 with six wins, but then he fractured his right scapula, essentially ending his season and, some felt, his career. He showed some promise in the 1971 spring training, but he was released.

=== Boston Red Sox ===
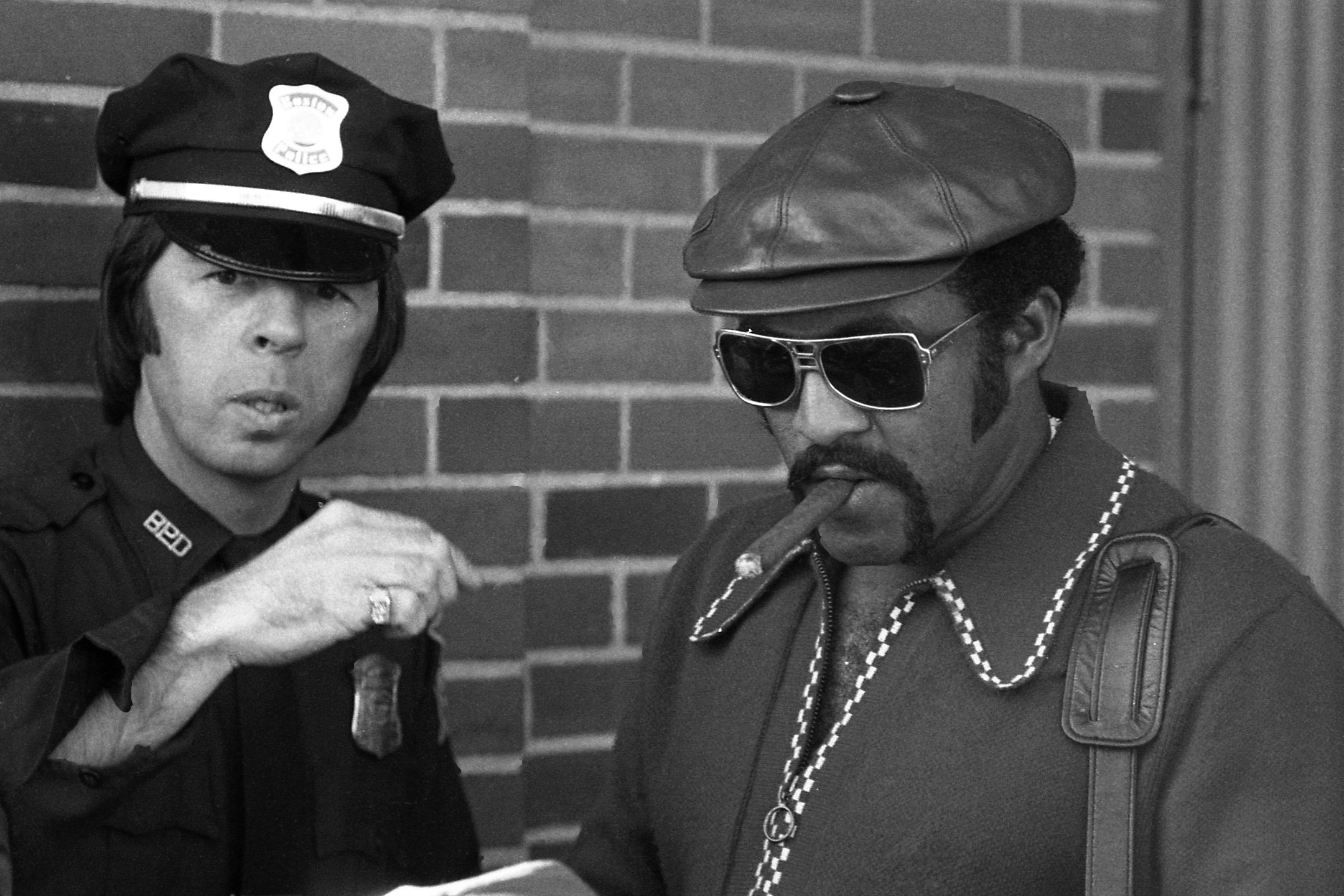
Tiant outside Fenway Park, 1970s

After being dropped by the Twins in spring training of 1971, the Atlanta Braves signed Tiant to a minor league contract to play with their Triple-A minor league Richmond team. Tiant began the process of reinventing himself as a pitcher by altering his delivery so that he turned away from home plate during his motion, in effect creating a hesitation pitch. According to Tiant, the new motion was a response to a drop in his velocity from his shoulder injury. Twisting and turning his body into unthinkable positions, Tiant would spend more time looking at second base than he did the plate as he prepared to throw. He varied his release point to effectively fool hitters. Curt Gowdy remarked of his delivery, "He comes... everywhere but between his legs. And he may do that in the ballgame. Sidearm, three-quarters, overhand..."

He pitched well in Richmond, and was acquired by the Louisville Colonels, a farm team of the Boston Red Sox. He was quickly called back up to the majors, but struggled through 1971 with a 1–7 record and 4.88 ERA. In 1972 he regained his old form with a sparkling 15–6 season in which he threw six shutouts in just 19 starts and led the American League with a 1.91 ERA. He would win 20 games in 1973, and 22 in an All-Star 1974 en route to becoming known as El Tiante at Fenway Park, one of the greatest and most beloved pitchers in Red Sox history and an enduring idol in Boston.

Though hampered by back problems in 1975, he won 18 games for the American League Champion Red Sox, then excelled in the postseason. In the playoffs he bested the three-time defending World Champion Oakland Athletics, allowing only three hits in a 7–1 complete-game victory, then opened the World Series against The Big Red Machine Cincinnati Reds. His father and mother were in Fenway Park that game to watch their son defeat the Reds 6–0 in a five-hit shutout, having been allowed to visit from Cuba under a special visa.

Tiant won Game 4 as well (throwing 173 pitches in his second complete game in the series) and had a no-decision in a Game 6 that has been called the greatest game ever played (ending in a dramatic Carlton Fisk 12th-inning walk-off home run).

Tiant went 21–12 as an All-Star in 1976, 12–8 in 1977, and 13–8 in 1978, furthering his status as a fan favorite and one of the greatest pitchers in Red Sox history.

=== New York Yankees ===
At the end of the 1978 season Tiant signed as a free agent with the New York Yankees. He compiled a 21–17 record in New York over 1979 and 1980.

=== Pittsburgh Pirates and California Angels ===
Tiant signed with the Pittsburgh Pirates as a free agent in 1981, pitching in just 9 games and going 2–5 with a 3.92 ERA. He also appeared in 21 games (all starts) for the Pirates' Triple-A Portland Beavers of the Pacific Coast League, posting a 13–7 record with 3.82 ERA.

He finished his career with a brief stint with the California Angels in 1982, pitching in 6 games and going 2–2 with a 5.76 ERA.

== Other leagues ==
Tiant competed in the Venezuelan Professional Baseball League in parts of seven seasons spanning 1963–1982, while compiling a record of 37–24 including 29 complete games, a 2.27 ERA, and a no-hitter in 1971. He was a member of the champion Leones del Caracas teams of 1966–67 and 1967–68. He gained induction into the Venezuelan Baseball Hall of Fame and Museum in 2009.

Tiant competed in the Senior Professional Baseball Association in 1989, initially signing with the Winter Haven Super Sox. He was subsequently traded to the Gold Coast Suns, in exchange for outfielder Ralph Garr and 500 Teddy Ruxpin toy bears (for use as a fan giveaway item). Tiant had an 0–1 record with 5.00 ERA for the Suns.

== Post-playing days ==
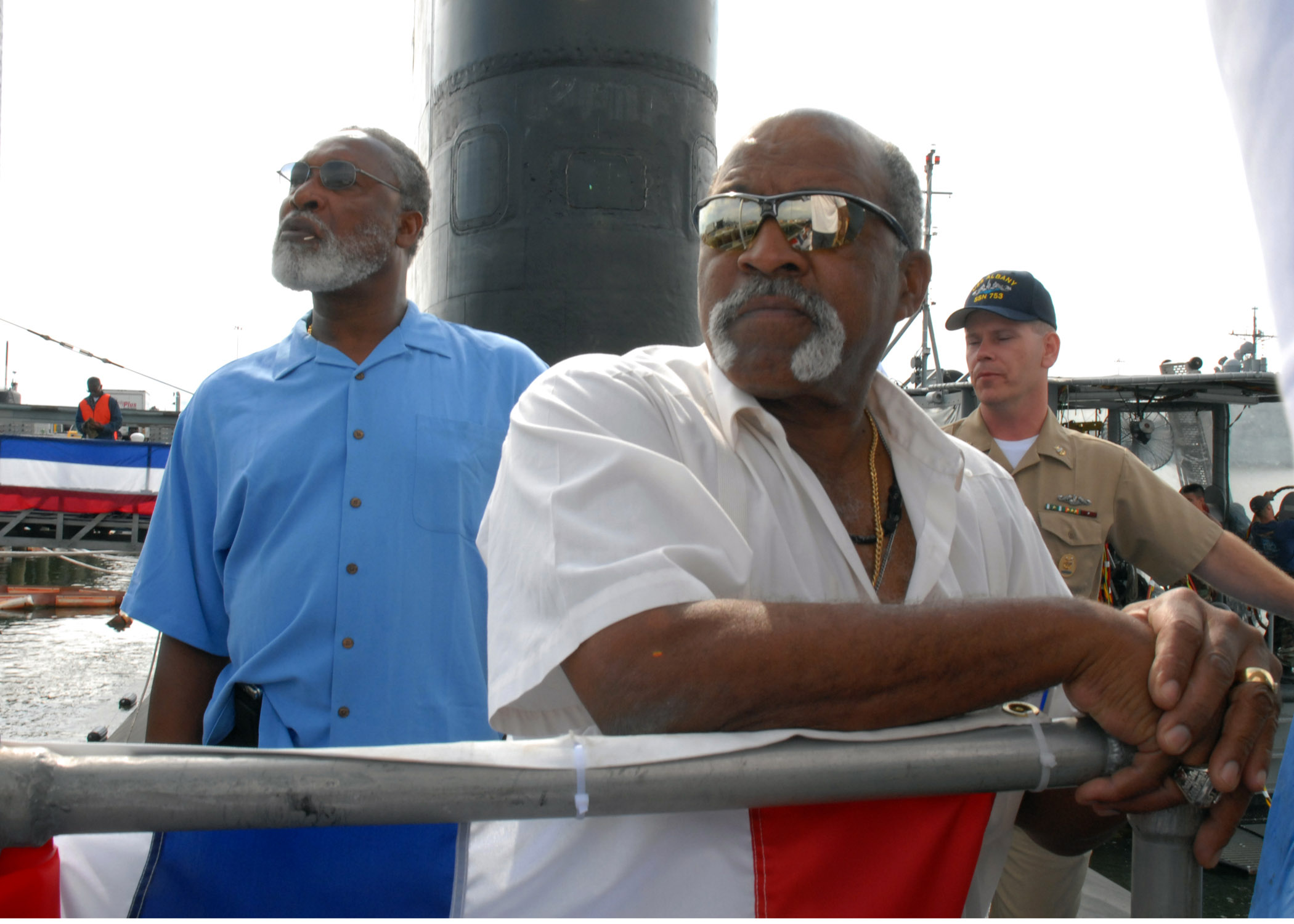
Tiant aboard the USS Albany, June 2007

Tiant was a minor league pitching coach in the Los Angeles Dodgers' farm system from 1992 to 1995, and in the Chicago White Sox's farm system in 1997. During the 1996 Summer Olympics, he was the pitching coach for the Nicaraguan team.

Tiant served as the head coach for the baseball team at the Savannah College of Art and Design, an NCAA Division III program, from 1998 to 2001, where his teams compiled a record of 55–97 for a .366 winning percentage.

In 2002, Tiant was the pitching coach for Boston's Class A Short Season affiliate, the Lowell Spinners, and has continued to serve as a special assignment instructor for the Red Sox.

Tiant, along with former batterymate Carlton Fisk, threw out the ceremonial first pitch before what proved to be the Red Sox' championship-winning Game 6 of the 2013 World Series at Fenway Park.

== MLB statistics ==
Tiant's major league stats:

| Years | W | L | ERA | G | GS | CG | SHO | SV | IP | H | R | ER | HR | BB | SO | HBP | WP | BF | WHIP | ERA+ | WAR |
|---|---|---|---|---|---|---|---|---|---|---|---|---|---|---|---|---|---|---|---|---|---|
| 19 | 229 | 172 | 3.30 | 573 | 484 | 187 | 49 | 15 | 3,486.1 | 3,075 | 1,400 | 1,280 | 346 | 1,104 | 2,416 | 49 | 27 | 14,365 | 1.199 | 114 | 65.7 |

== Hall of Fame candidacy ==
Tiant was on the National Baseball Hall of Fame ballot from 1988 to 2002, but peaked at 30.9% of the votes in his first ballot year. According to election rules at the time, players were permitted on the Baseball Writers' Association of America ballot for a maximum of 15 years; in his 15th and final appearance on the ballot, Tiant received 18.0% of the vote during 2002 balloting.

Tiant was considered again for induction by the Hall of Fame's own Golden Era Committee (for the 1947–1972 era) in 2011 and 2014, and by the Modern Era Baseball Committee (for the 1970–1987 era) in 2017, but again fell short. The Golden Era Committee was replaced in July 2016 by a 16-member Golden Days Committee, to vote from a 10 candidate ballot for the 1950–1969 era. The Golden Days Committee elected its first Hall of Fame members in December 2021, but Tiant was not among them. He appeared on the Classic Baseball Era Committee's 2025 ballot, but only received less than five votes.

== Personal life ==
Tiant and his wife, Maria, had three children: Luis Jr., Isabel, and Daniel. As of 2001, the family was living in Southborough, Massachusetts.

An avid cigar smoker, Tiant launched a line of cigars that he formulated and designed, branding them with his nickname, El Tiante. Tommy John remembered Tiant's cigars only too well from their days in the Indians organization. "Luis would smoke these horrendous, long, Cuban cigars. We'd be on the bus all night, and wake up to a thick blue haze from Tiant's ropes. Tiant had an almost supernatural ability for keeping a cigar lit. Luis would cut up in his high-pitched voice, joking, cackling, and the eternal flame held true. He could even take a shower and keep his stogie going. In the confined space of a bus, the smoke would gag you. He'd fall asleep on the bus, but the cigar would somehow stay alive all night."

Tiant appeared in an episode of Cheers, "Now Pitching, Sam Malone", which first aired on January 6, 1983. Sam Malone (Ted Danson) agrees to do a television beer commercial, co-starring with and "relieving" Tiant when the latter begins to fail in his promotion of the product.

Tiant authored two autobiographies:

- El Tiante, the Luis Tiant story, written with Joe Fitzgerald, released in 1976
- Son of Havana: A Baseball Journey from Cuba to the Big Leagues and Back, written with Saul Wisnia, released in May 2019

Tiant was the subject of two documentary films, the WGBH-TV 2003 production El Tiante: A Red Sox Story produced by Patricia Alvarado Nuñez, which premiered at the Harvard Film Archives and on television on GBH Channel 2 (PBS-Boston). The Lost Son of Havana, produced by Kris Meyer and the Farrelly brothers, and directed by Jonathan Hock. The story of his return visit to his roots in Cuba had its world premiere on April 23, 2009, at the Tribeca Film Festival, and was promptly acquired by ESPN Films.

Tiant died at his home in Wells, Maine, on October 8, 2024, at the age of 83.

== See also ==
- List of Afro-Latinos
- List of Major League Baseball players from Cuba
- List of Major League Baseball career wins leaders
- List of Major League Baseball annual ERA leaders
- List of Major League Baseball career strikeout leaders
