= Woodie Fryman =

American baseball player (1940–2011)

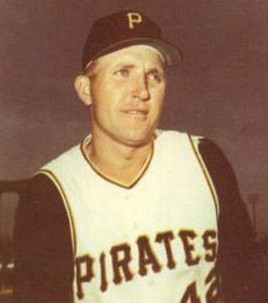
- Fryman in 1966
- Pitcher
- Born: April 12, 1940; Ewing, Kentucky, U.S.
- Died: February 4, 2011 (aged 70); Ewing, Kentucky, U.S.
- Batted: Right Threw: Left

MLB debut
- April 15, 1966, for the Pittsburgh Pirates

Last MLB appearance
- July 28, 1983, for the Montreal Expos

MLB statistics
- Win–loss record: 141–155
- Earned run average: 3.77
- Strikeouts: 1,587
- Stats at Baseball Reference

Teams
- Pittsburgh Pirates (1966–1967); Philadelphia Phillies (1968–1972); Detroit Tigers (1972–1974); Montreal Expos (1975–1976); Cincinnati Reds (1977); Chicago Cubs (1978); Montreal Expos (1978–1983)

Career highlights and awards
- 2× All-Star (1968, 1976); Montreal Expos Hall of Fame

Woodrow Thompson Fryman (April 12, 1940 – February 4, 2011) was an American professional baseball pitcher who played in Major League Baseball (MLB) for six teams, across 18 seasons (1966–1983). A two-time National League (NL) All-Star, he helped the Detroit Tigers reach the 1972 American League Championship Series and the Montreal Expos reach the 1981 National League Championship Series.

== Early life ==
Fryman was born on April 12, 1940, in Ewing, Kentucky. He did not attend high school or college. The son of Woodrow and Almedia Fryman, he and his brother worked on the 520 acre family farm. His father played and managed sandlot baseball, and once had a tryout with the Cincinnati Reds.

Fryman played amateur baseball in Kentucky. In 1960, the Pittsburgh Pirates offered him a contract and $5,000 bonus, but he wanted $20,000, in light of the money he would otherwise make on the farm. The Pirates declined and it would be another five years before he contacted the Pirates about pitching for them.

== Professional career ==
=== Pittsburgh Pirates ===
Fryman was 25 years old when he signed with the Pirates in 1965. In 1965, he played one year of minor league baseball for the Triple-A Columbus Jets and Single-A Batavia Pirates. His combined record was 3–4, with a 2.81 earned run average (ERA), with 74 strikeouts in 64 innings pitched.

He debuted out of the bullpen for the Pirates in 1966, however, he made more appearances as a starter that year (28 out of 36 appearances). Fryman was used pretty evenly in both roles throughout his career (322 starts in 625 appearances). He went 12–9 with a 3.81 earned run average his rookie season, including three shutouts in a row against the Philadelphia Phillies, New York Mets and Chicago Cubs, respectively. His shutout against the Mets was nearly a perfect game, as Ron Hunt led off the Mets' half of the first inning with a single, and was immediately caught trying to steal second. Fryman retired the next 26 batters he faced without allowing another baserunner all game. Fryman had three other one-hitters in his career.

His record dipped to 3–8 with a 4.05 ERA in 1967. Following the season, he was dealt to the Philadelphia Phillies with Bill Laxton, Don Money and Harold Clem for Jim Bunning. Fryman was a lifelong Kentuckian, and Bunning would go on to become a United States Congressman and Senator from Kentucky, who was present to honor Fryman's 2005 induction into the Kentucky Athletic Hall of Fame.

=== Philadelphia Phillies ===
After a complete-game victory against the San Francisco Giants on June 18, 1968, Fryman's record stood at 10–5 with a 1.61 ERA, and he was named the Phillies' sole representative at the 1968 All-Star Game. He dropped his next five decisions, and ended the season with a 12–14 record and 2.78 ERA.

Fryman was used almost exclusively as a starter his first two seasons in Philadelphia (32 starts in 34 appearances and 35 starts in 36 appearances), but he began being used more and more in relief in 1970 and 1971. A Pirates coach had insisted that Fryman throw more curveballs, and this affected his pitching elbow over time. He was first diagnosed with an arthritic elbow while playing for the Phillies, a problem that would persist. In 1972, Fryman was 4–10 with a 4.36 ERA for the 34–61 Phillies when the club placed him on waivers at the end of July.

The Phillies had worked with Fryman's physical limitations, and used him as a spot starter and relief pitcher in 1970–71, where respectively he went 8–6 (20 starts in 27 appearances) and 10–7 (17 starts in 37 appearances). In 1972, the team was trying to develop its younger pitchers and was less able to accommodate Fryman in a regimented manner, and his use became more unpredictable, while his effectiveness had diminished. Fryman's wife, who avidly followed his baseball career, was actively distressed over the situation, and Fryman believed his family's harmony was more important so he told the team's executives that he would have to retire and move home to his Kentucky farm if he could not play more regularly. Although the Phillies wanted to keep him, they allowed Fryman to go to the Tigers in the interest of Fryman and his family.

During Fryman's four full seasons with the Phillies, the team played poorly, with records of 76–86 (1968), 63–99 (1969), 73–88 (1970), and 67–95 (1971). During those years, Fryman was 12–14, 12–15, 8–6, and 10–7. The fact that Fryman played for poor teams over his 18 seasons affected his total career win–loss record of 141–155 to his detriment, and is not indicative of how well he actually pitched.

=== Detroit Tigers ===
The Detroit Tigers were battling the Baltimore Orioles, New York Yankees and Boston Red Sox for first place in the American League East when they claimed Fryman off waivers on August 2, 1972. Fryman turned his season around with the Tigers. He was 9–3 with a 2.21 ERA when the Red Sox came to Detroit for a three-game set to end the season, a half game up on the Tigers.

Detroit manager Billy Martin handed the ball to Mickey Lolich for the first game of the set. Lolich pitched a complete-game victory to put the Tigers up a half game on the Red Sox as Fryman took the mound for the second game of the set.

The Red Sox scored an unearned run in the first, and held onto a 1–0 lead until the Tigers clawed out a run off Luis Tiant in the sixth. They followed that up with two more runs in the seventh. Fryman, meanwhile, only allowed two hits after the first inning. After giving up a lead-off single in the eighth, he retired the next two batters he faced before turning the game over to Chuck Seelbach. Seelbach struck out two of the four batters he faced as Detroit beat the Red Sox 3–1 to clinch the division.

During the pennant drive to defeat the Red Sox for first place, Fryman won seven of his last eight decisions, with a 1.79 ERA, and was 10–3 with a 2.06 ERA down the stretch, making him an essential factor in the Tigers getting to the playoffs instead of ending in second place.

Fryman's .769 win percentage was tops in the American League in 1972. As he only pitched in 16 games (with 14 starts) and 113.2 innings in the AL that year, however, Catfish Hunter had the official league leading winning percentage at .750. Fryman's ERA+ of 154 is one of the highest in Detroit franchise history.

==== 1972 ALCS ====
The Tigers lost the first game of the ALCS with the Oakland Athletics 3–2 in 11 innings. Fryman did not have his best stuff as he made the start in game two of the ALCS. He left them in the fifth inning behind 1–0 and the bases loaded. The bullpen allowed all three inherited runners to score as the A's cruised to a 5–0 victory, and a 2–0 lead in the ALCS.

Detroit came back to win the following two games in Tiger Stadium to take the series to five games. Fryman took the mound for the deciding game, as did his opponent from game two, Blue Moon Odom. Fryman pitched well, allowing two runs and just four hits over eight innings. One run was scored on a steal of home by Reggie Jackson, and the other was an unearned run, the result of a Dick McAuliffe error in the fourth. However, Oakland's pitching was even better, as Odom and Vida Blue combined to allow just one unearned run to send the A's to the 1972 World Series.

=== Montreal Expos ===
Fryman spent two more seasons with the Tigers before being dealt to the Montreal Expos for Terry Humphrey and Tom Walker on December 4, 1974. Along with Dave McNally from the Baltimore Orioles, he was the second left-handed pitcher acquired that day by the Expos, a team devoid of southpaws for all but three weeks of the 1974 campaign.

Fryman's record stood at 8–6 with a 3.74 ERA when he earned his second All-Star nod in 1976. As with his first selection in 1968, he was his team's lone representative, and he did not appear in the game. He was the Expos Player of the Year in 1976.

=== Cincinnati Reds ===
Fryman was traded with Dale Murray to the Cincinnati Reds for Tony Pérez and Will McEnaney on December 16, 1976. He and Reds manager Sparky Anderson did not get along, and Fryman's record stood at 5–5 with a 5.38 ERA when he announced his retirement midway through the 1977 season. Following the season, he was lured back out of retirement, and dealt with Bill Caudill to the Chicago Cubs for Bill Bonham.

=== Return to Montreal ===
Fryman made just 13 appearances and was 2–4 with a 5.17 ERA for the Cubs when he was dealt to the Montreal Expos for a player to be named later (Jerry White) on June 9 of the 1978 season. Turning 39 at the start of the 1979 season, Fryman was converted into a full-time relief pitcher by manager Dick Williams (all 44 of his games were in relief). He made the postseason for the second time in his career following the strike shortened 1981 season. In the 1981 National League Division Series against the Philadelphia Phillies, he pitched 1 1/3 inning, and gave up one earned run. In the 1981 National League Championship Series, he gave up four earned runs to the Los Angeles Dodgers in one inning pitched.

Fryman was 24–17 with 46 saves and a 2.73 ERA as a full-time reliever for the Expos entering the 1983 season. Fryman felt these were the years of his best pitching, because of all the pitching knowledge he had gained. He made one appearance in April 1983 before going on the disabled list. Fryman recalled: "It was early in the 1983 season and my arm just popped and I couldn't even raise it." He returned to the club in July, but after going 0–3 with a 21.00 ERA, and blowing his only save opportunity, he retired. He was 43 at the time he retired.

== Honors ==
Fryman was inducted into the Montreal Expos' Hall of Fame in 1995, and the Kentucky Sports Hall of Fame in 2005.

== Personal life ==
After his playing days, manager Ralph Houk offered Fryman a pitching coach job, but Fryman returned to his family and farm in Kentucky.

== Death ==
Fryman suffered from Alzheimer's disease and was cared for by his wife Phyllis (Delaney) Fryman. On February 4, 2011, Fryman died in his hometown of Ewing, Kentucky from a heart ailment.

== Career stats ==
W	L	PCT	ERA	G	GS	CG	SHO	SV	IP	H	ER	R	HR	BB	K	WP	HBP	Fld%
141	155	.476	3.77	625	322	68	27	58	2411.1	2367	1010	1136	187	890	1587	68	68	.988

== See also ==
- Best pitching seasons by a Detroit Tiger
- Detroit Tigers award winners and league leaders
