= 1968 Major League Baseball All-Star Game =

1968 American baseball competition

	1	2	3	4	5	6	7	8	9	R	H	E
American League	0	0	0	0	0	0	0	0	0	0	3	1
National League	1	0	0	0	0	0	0	0	x	1	5	0
- Date: July 9, 1968
- Venue: Houston Astrodome
- City: Houston, Texas
- Managers: Dick Williams (BOS); Red Schoendienst (STL)
- MVP: Willie Mays (San Francisco Giants)
- Attendance: 48,321
- Television: NBC
- TV announcers: Curt Gowdy, Pee Wee Reese and Sandy Koufax
- Radio: NBC
- Radio announcers: Jim Simpson, Tony Kubek and Gene Elston

The 1968 Major League Baseball All-Star Game was the 39th playing of the midsummer classic between the all-stars of the American League (AL) and National League (NL), the two leagues comprising Major League Baseball.

The game was held on July 9, 1968, at the Astrodome in Houston, Texas the home of the Houston Astros of the National League, making this the first All-Star Game to be played indoors. The game resulted in the National League defeating the American League 1–0. It is the only All-Star Game played without a run batted in (RBI).

This was the first night All-Star Game since 1944. Apart from the 1969 game (which was originally scheduled to be played at night but was postponed to the following afternoon due to rain), all subsequent All-Star Games have been played at night.

The next indoor All-Star Game was eleven years later, at the Kingdome in Seattle.

== Game summary ==
The American League was limited to three hits, unable to get a rally going against Don Drysdale, Juan Marichal, Steve Carlton and Tom Seaver, all future Hall of Famers.

A first-inning run scored by Willie Mays on a single, an errant pickoff attempt, a wild pitch by Luis Tiant and a double-play ball gave the winning National league the only run they would need.

Don Wert's eighth-inning double momentarily gave the AL a threat to tie the game, but Seaver struck out the side. In the ninth, with two out, Jerry Koosman was brought in from the bullpen to face Carl Yastrzemski, whose strikeout ended the game.

== Starting lineups ==
American League				National League			
Order	Player	Team	Position	Order	Player	Team	Position
1	Jim Fregosi	Angels	SS	1	Willie Mays	Giants	OF
2	Rod Carew	Twins	2B	2	Curt Flood	Cardinals	OF
3	Carl Yastrzemski	Red Sox	OF	3	Willie McCovey	Giants	1B
4	Frank Howard	Senators	OF	4	Hank Aaron	Braves	OF
5	Willie Horton	Tigers	OF	5	Ron Santo	Cubs	3B
6	Harmon Killebrew	Twins	1B	6	Tommy Helms	Reds	2B
7	Bill Freehan	Tigers	C	7	Jerry Grote	Mets	C
8	Brooks Robinson	Orioles	3B	8	Don Kessinger	Cubs	SS
9	Luis Tiant	Indians	P	9	Don Drysdale	Dodgers	P

== Reserves ==
=== American League ===
==== Pitchers ====
Throws	Pitcher	Team	Notes
RH	Gary Bell	Boston Red Sox
LH	Tommy John	Chicago White Sox
LH	Sam McDowell	Cleveland Indians
RH	Denny McLain	Detroit Tigers
RH	Blue Moon Odom	Oakland Athletics
RH	José Santiago	Boston Red Sox
RH	Mel Stottlemyre	New York Yankees

==== Position players ====
Position	Player	Team	Notes
1B	Mickey Mantle	New York Yankees
1B	Boog Powell	Baltimore Orioles
2B	Davey Johnson	Baltimore Orioles
3B	Don Wert	Detroit Tigers
C	Joe Azcue	Cleveland Indians
C	Duane Josephson	Chicago White Sox
OF	Rick Monday	Oakland Athletics
OF	Tony Oliva	Minnesota Twins
OF	Ken Harrelson	Boston Red Sox
SS	Bert Campaneris	Oakland Athletics

=== National League ===
==== Pitchers ====
Throws	Pitcher	Team	Notes
LH	Steve Carlton	St. Louis Cardinals
LH	Woody Fryman	Philadelphia Phillies
RH	Bob Gibson	St. Louis Cardinals
RH	Jerry Koosman	New York Mets
RH	Juan Marichal	San Francisco Giants
RH	Ron Reed	Atlanta Braves
RH	Tom Seaver	New York Mets

==== Position players ====
Position	Player	Team	Notes
1B	Rusty Staub	Houston Astros
2B	Julian Javier	St. Louis Cardinals
3B	Tony Pérez	Cincinnati Reds
C	Johnny Bench	Cincinnati Reds
C	Tom Haller	Los Angeles Dodgers
OF	Felipe Alou	Atlanta Braves
OF	Matty Alou	Pittsburgh Pirates
OF	Pete Rose	Cincinnati Reds
OF	Billy Williams	Chicago Cubs
SS	Gene Alley	Pittsburgh Pirates
SS	Leo Cardenas	Cincinnati Reds

== Line score ==
=== Line score ===
Tuesday, July 9, 1968 7:15 pm (CT) at Houston Astrodome in Houston, Texas
Team	1	2	3	4	5	6	7	8	9	R	H	E
American League	0	0	0	0	0	0	0	0	0	0	3	1
National League	1	0	0	0	0	0	0	0	X	1	5	0
WP: Don Drysdale (1-0) LP: Luis Tiant (0-1) Sv: Jerry Koosman
