= Nelson Briles =

American baseball player (1943–2005)

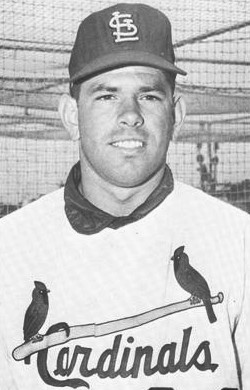
- Briles in 1965
- Pitcher
- Born: August 5, 1943; Dorris, California, U.S.
- Died: February 13, 2005 (aged 61); Orlando, Florida, U.S.
- Batted: Right Threw: Right

MLB debut
- April 19, 1965, for the St. Louis Cardinals

Last MLB appearance
- September 13, 1978, for the Baltimore Orioles

MLB statistics
- Win–loss record: 129–112
- Earned run average: 3.44
- Strikeouts: 1,163
- Stats at Baseball Reference

Teams
- St. Louis Cardinals (1965–1970); Pittsburgh Pirates (1971–1973); Kansas City Royals (1974–1975); Texas Rangers (1976–1977); Baltimore Orioles (1977–1978)

Career highlights and awards
- 2× World Series champion (1967, 1971)

Nelson Kelley Briles (August 5, 1943 – February 13, 2005) was an American Major League Baseball pitcher. A hard thrower whose best pitch was a slider, he exhibited excellent control. Briles batted and threw right-handed. He was a starting pitcher on World Series champions with the St. Louis Cardinals in 1967 and Pittsburgh Pirates in 1971.

== St. Louis Cardinals ==
Born in Dorris, California, he grew up in Chico, California where he played baseball at Chico Senior High School. He met his wife, Ginger Briles, in their high school musical, Damn Yankees. He then played baseball at Santa Clara University (1961-1963) before signing with the St. Louis Cardinals as an amateur free agent in 1963. He spent just one season in their farm system before joining the Cards in 1965.

Though used primarily as a starting pitcher in 1964 with the Tulsa Oilers, Briles pitched out of the bullpen upon his arrival in the majors. He was 1–2 with a 3.29 earned run average and one save as a relief pitcher when he made his first start on September 25 against the Los Angeles Dodgers. Though he pitched well (seven innings, one earned run), he was out-pitched by Sandy Koufax, and lost his first major league start. He was far less effective in his next start (six earned runs in seven innings pitched), however managed to win that one thanks to the nineteen runs his Cardinals teammates put on the board.

Briles suffered through a hard luck 1966 season, going 4-15 despite a relatively modest 3.21 ERA. He was 4–3 with a 3.55 ERA and six saves in 1967 when an injury to Bob Gibson (a broken leg suffered at the hands of a Roberto Clemente line drive) forced him into the starting rotation. He lost two of his first three starts, but then won his last nine decisions to end the season at 14–5 with a National League leading .737 winning percentage (the Cardinals also won his two no-decisions during that stretch). His 2.43 ERA was also best on the Cardinals staff.

The Cards finished the season at 101–60 to cruise into the 1967 World Series. Facing the Boston Red Sox, Briles was tabbed as the game three starter. Triple crown winner Carl Yastrzemski emerged as the game two hero for the Bosox with two home runs and four runs batted in. After the loss, Cardinals manager Red Schoendienst commented to the media that Red Sox starter Jim Lonborg was brushing back Cardinal hitters. In Yastrzemski's first at-bat in game three, Briles hit him on the calf with a pitch causing an argument at home plate between the two teams' managers. From there, Briles held Yastrzemski hitless on his way to a 5-2 complete game victory. He also pitched two scoreless innings in game six.

Briles won his first four starts of 1968 to bring his winning streak to thirteen games (14 including the post-season). He won a career high nineteen games with a career high 141 strikeouts that year to establish himself as a legitimate number two starter behind Gibson. The World Champion Cardinals returned to the World Series in 1968 to face the Detroit Tigers. Briles made the game two start against Mickey Lolich, and gave up four earned runs in five plus innings to take the loss. Paired up against Lolich again for game five, Briles left the game in the seventh inning with a 3–2 lead and a runner on first. The bullpen, however, was unable to hold the lead.

Briles went 15–13 with a 3.52 ERA in 1969 as the Cards slumped to fourth place in the newly formed National League East. He left in the third inning of his May 12, 1970 start against the Philadelphia Phillies with a pulled muscle in his right leg. He tried pitching through the injury, but was ineffective, and placed on the disabled list for the first time in his career on June 13. He was never able to regain form, and ended the season at 6–7 with a 6.24 ERA. Just as pitchers and catchers were reporting the following season, he and Vic Davalillo were sent to the Pittsburgh Pirates for Matty Alou and George Brunet.

== Pittsburgh Pirates ==
1971 print of Briles posing for Pittsburgh Pirates

Briles spent most of his first season in Pittsburgh in the bullpen, however, was added to the starting rotation in September. Though he pitched very well, (3-1 with two shutouts, a complete game and a 1.74 ERA) he did not make an appearance in the 1971 National League Championship Series against the San Francisco Giants. He did, however, earn a game five start in the 1971 World Series against the Baltimore Orioles. With the series tied at two games apiece, Briles pitched a brilliant two-hitter to carry the eventual World Champions to a 3–2 series lead. He also drove in a run with a second inning single. He pitched three seasons for the Pirates, going 36–28 with a 2.98 ERA.

Briles, who studied drama at Santa Clara, became just as famous off the field in Pittsburgh with a nightclub act in which he sang and told jokes. Perhaps the second most memorable moment of his time with the Pirates had to do with hockey rather than baseball. On his way to training camp in Bradenton, Florida in 1972, Briles made a pit stop at a hockey game between the St. Louis Blues and Boston Bruins. Between periods, Blues radio broadcaster Dan Kelly interviewed Briles. Comments Briles made about Pittsburgh sports fans and the Pittsburgh Penguins were deemed insulting by Pittsburgh fans. He denied most of the quotes attributed to him and claimed that his words were misconstrued. His last act while a member of the Pirates was singing "The Star-Spangled Banner" prior to Game 4 of the 1973 World Series.

== Kansas City Royals ==
He was traded with Fernando González to the Kansas City Royals for Kurt Bevacqua, Ed Kirkpatrick and minor league first baseman Winston Cole at the Winter Meetings in Houston on December 4, 1973. Shortly after the trade, Briles released the single "Hey Hank" b/w "Soft the Summer Wind Blows" on Capitol Records. "Hey Hank" was the pitcher's plea to Hank Aaron that he try to hit home run number 715 off somebody else (though Briles was now in the American League). Briles suffered set back after set back with the Royals. Just as the 1974 season was set to begin, he was placed on the disabled list with a sore right knee. After two appearances, he reinjured the knee, requiring surgery.

Likewise, his 1975 season was hampered by injuries. After missing the entire month of June, he returned on the Fourth of July, but was forced to leave his first game back with soreness in his elbow. He was forced out of his final start of the season on September 1 after three innings when his knee began acting up again. After the season, he was traded to the Texas Rangers for second baseman Dave Nelson.

== Texas Rangers, Baltimore Orioles ==
Briles returned healthy to make 31 starts for the Rangers in 1976. With a staff that also included Hall of Famers Gaylord Perry and Bert Blyleven, Rangers pitching kept them in first or near first place in the American League West through May. However, they ended the season at 76–86, and in fourth place. For his part, Briles went 11–9 with a 3.26 ERA to be named the team's "Pitcher of the Year."

With Doyle Alexander and Dock Ellis added to the starting rotation in 1977, Briles was relegated to the bullpen and fifth starter duties. He was claimed off waivers by the Baltimore Orioles on September 19.

Briles' 1978 season with the Orioles was also hampered with injuries. Even when healthy, he was used very sparingly by Orioles manager Earl Weaver (54 1/3 innings pitched, by far a career low). He was released by the Orioles on January 17, 1979.

== Career stats ==
Seasons	W	L	Pct.	ERA	G	GS	CG	SHO	SV	IP	H	ER	R	HR	BB	K	WP	HBP	Fld%	Avg.
14	129	112	.535	3.44	452	279	64	17	22	2111.2	2141	807	929	186	547	1163	50	51	.966	.154

Briles had good reason to record "Hey Hank." Aaron had six career home runs off Briles in 67 at-bats, second only to Willie McCovey with seven.

== Personal life ==
Nelson Briles met his future wife, Mary "Ginger" Briles through their high school musical, Damn Yankees. Briles was an avid hunter and would frequently travel for hunting. One of his more notable shots was a moose in Canada. He lived with his family in Latrobe, Pennsylvania. He was an avid lover of old movies and jazz music. Briles also enjoyed opera and was known to sing it while riding the gondolas in Disney World.

== Retirement ==
After being released by the Orioles, Briles spent spring training 1979 with the New York Mets. Though he failed to make the club, he appears in a Saturday Night Live skit featuring actual Mets players. Fictional Dominican second baseman Chico Escuela (portrayed by Garrett Morris) was also with the Mets that spring attempting to make a comeback at 41 years old. However, he was feeling some resistance from his teammates as his tell-all book about his playing days with the Mets, Bad Stuff 'Bout the Mets, had just hit bookstores. Briles commented that he could not forgive Escuela for writing such a book.

Following his retirement as a player, Briles worked as a television color commentator for the Pirates, Seattle Mariners, and USA Network. He joined the Pirates' front office in 1986 as director of corporate sales. He founded the Pittsburgh Pirates Alumni Association, and was also the director of the team's annual fantasy camp.

Briles collapsed and died of an apparent heart attack in Orlando, Florida, while participating in the annual Pirates alumni golf tournament. He was 61. He was survived by his wife of forty years, Ginger, and their four children, Kelley, David, Christina and Sarah, as well as his 10 grandchildren.
