= List of Major League Baseball pitchers who have beaten all 30 teams =

Since 1998, there have been 30 teams in Major League Baseball (MLB). It is very rare for a pitcher to record a win against every team. In earlier times, two factors made it nearly impossible to defeat all teams in both leagues (even before expansion increased the number to 30):

- Before the era of free-agency, in which players are free to move to another team at the end of their contract, a pitcher would play for only a few teams, and could not, of course, win a game against his own team.
- Before inter-league play began in June 1997, a pitcher would see only half of the 30 teams in any single season, unless traded to a team in the other league. Even with inter-league play, a pitcher may not have his spot in a typical 5-man rotation match the games in the single 3- or 4-game series against another team, and only a few teams from the other league were played in any season prior to 2023.

In any case, defeating all teams is more likely only if a pitcher has a long career. In 2023, the MLB switched to a more balanced schedule, and for the first time in MLB history, every team played every other team in each league at least three times. MLB teams now play 1 three-game series against 14 of the other league's teams, with the home team switching every year, and 2 three-game series (one series at home, one away) against the team in the other league deemed their "geographic rival." They also play more games against non-division teams in their league, and as a result, play less intra-divisional games.

== 30 team winners ==
As of October 1, 2025, there have been 26 pitchers who have beaten all 30 teams. Only 16 teams have had a pitcher accomplish the feat while on their roster, with the San Francisco Giants and New York Yankees the only franchises to have three such pitchers: Randy Johnson, Barry Zito, and Tim Hudson for the Giants, and Kevin Brown, Javier Vázquez, and Gerrit Cole for the Yankees. Johnson is so far the only member to be elected to the National Baseball Hall of Fame.

*	Denotes elected to National Baseball Hall of Fame
Bold	Denotes active player (Note: A player is considered inactive if he has announced his retirement or not played for a full season.)

Name	Date feat was accomplished	Team	Opponent	Score
Al Leiter	April 30, 2002	New York Mets	@ Arizona Diamondbacks	10–1
Kevin Brown	March 31, 2004	New York Yankees	@ Tampa Bay Devil Rays	12–1 (Note: In Tokyo, Japan.)
Terry Mulholland	July 19, 2004	Minnesota Twins	@ Detroit Tigers	3–1
Curt Schilling	September 10, 2004	Boston Red Sox	@ Seattle Mariners	13–2
Woody Williams	September 26, 2006	San Diego Padres	@ St. Louis Cardinals	7–5
Jamie Moyer	May 26, 2008	Philadelphia Phillies	vs. Colorado Rockies	20–5
Randy Johnson *	April 19, 2009	San Francisco Giants	vs. Arizona Diamondbacks	2–0
Barry Zito	June 12, 2010	San Francisco Giants	vs. Oakland Athletics	5–4
Javier Vázquez	July 21, 2010	New York Yankees	vs. Los Angeles Angels	10–6
Vicente Padilla	August 10, 2010	Los Angeles Dodgers	@ Philadelphia Phillies	15–9
Derek Lowe	May 10, 2012	Cleveland Indians	@ Boston Red Sox	8–3
A. J. Burnett	July 21, 2012	Pittsburgh Pirates	vs. Miami Marlins	5–1
Dan Haren	August 9, 2013	Washington Nationals	vs. Philadelphia Phillies	9–2
Kyle Lohse	June 26, 2015	Milwaukee Brewers	vs. Minnesota Twins	10–4
Tim Hudson	July 26, 2015	San Francisco Giants	vs. Oakland Athletics	4–3
John Lackey	April 18, 2016	Chicago Cubs	@ St. Louis Cardinals	5–0
**Max Scherzer**	May 11, 2016	Washington Nationals	vs. Detroit Tigers	3–2 (Note: Scherzer is the first pitcher to accomplish the feat with a complete game. He also struck out 20 batters, tying an MLB record for a nine-inning game.)
Bartolo Colon	August 20, 2017	Minnesota Twins	vs. Arizona Diamondbacks	12–5
Zack Greinke	September 14, 2019	Houston Astros	@ Kansas City Royals	6–1
**Gerrit Cole**	July 10, 2021	New York Yankees	@ Houston Astros	1–0
**Justin Verlander**	May 10, 2023	New York Mets	@ Cincinnati Reds	2–1
Charlie Morton	June 28, 2024	Atlanta Braves	vs. Pittsburgh Pirates	6–1
Lance Lynn	July 30, 2024	St. Louis Cardinals	vs. Texas Rangers	8–1
**Jose Quintana**	April 11, 2025	Milwaukee Brewers	vs. Arizona Diamondbacks	7–0
**Kevin Gausman**	April 15, 2025	Toronto Blue Jays	vs. Atlanta Braves	6–3
**Michael Wacha**	September 27, 2025	Kansas City Royals	@ Athletics	4–2

== Active pitchers approaching 30 wins ==
=== 29 team winners ===
As of August 29, 2026, seven active pitchers have defeated 29 teams.

- Yu Darvish – has not defeated the Baltimore Orioles.
- Sonny Gray - has not defeated the Arizona Diamondbacks.
- Wade Miley – has not defeated the New York Yankees.
- Blake Snell - has not defeated the Atlanta Braves.
- Marcus Stroman - has not defeated the Toronto Blue Jays.
- Jameson Taillon - has not defeated the Los Angeles Dodgers.
- Luis Castillo - has not defeated the Seattle Mariners.

=== 28 team winners ===
As of August 29, 2026, eight active pitchers have defeated 28 teams.

- Trevor Bauer – has not defeated the Cleveland Guardians or New York Mets.
- José Berríos - has not defeated the Los Angeles Dodgers or New York Mets.
- Patrick Corbin - has not defeated the Arizona Diamondbacks or Tampa Bay Rays.
- Jon Gray - has not defeated the New York Yankees or Tampa Bay Rays.
- Robbie Ray - has not defeated the Detroit Tigers or Kansas City Royals.
- Eduardo Rodríguez - has not defeated the Arizona Diamondbacks or Milwaukee Brewers.
- Chris Sale - has not defeated the Atlanta Braves or St. Louis Cardinals.
- Zack Wheeler - has not defeated the Kansas City Royals or Minnesota Twins.

=== 27 team winners ===
As of August 29, 2026, seven active pitchers have defeated 27 teams.

- Chris Bassitt - has not defeated the Chicago Cubs, Colorado Rockies, or Toronto Blue Jays.
- Zach Eflin - has not defeated the Houston Astros, Los Angeles Dodgers, or Philadelphia Phillies.
- Nathan Eovaldi - has not defeated the Chicago Cubs, Los Angeles Dodgers, or Milwaukee Brewers.
- Max Fried - has not defeated the Athletics, Los Angeles Angels, or Atlanta Braves.
- Nick Pivetta - has not defeated the Boston Red Sox, Los Angeles Angels, or San Diego Padres.
- Carlos Rodón - has not defeated the Arizona Diamondbacks, San Francisco Giants, or Washington Nationals.
- Framber Valdez - has not defeated the Cincinnati Reds, Houston Astros, or San Diego Padres.

=== 26 team winners ===
As of August 29, 2026, seven active pitchers have defeated 26 teams.

- Carlos Carrasco — has not defeated the Cleveland Guardians, Los Angeles Dodgers, New York Mets, or St. Louis Cardinals.
- Alex Cobb - has not defeated the Los Angeles Dodgers, San Francisco Giants, Tampa Bay Rays, or Washington Nationals.
- Johnny Cueto – has not defeated the Baltimore Orioles, Boston Red Sox, Tampa Bay Rays, or Texas Rangers.
- Dallas Keuchel - has not defeated the Cincinnati Reds, Houston Astros, Milwaukee Brewers, or San Francisco Giants.
- Jordan Lyles - has not defeated the Atlanta Braves, Baltimore Orioles, Los Angeles Dodgers, or Washington Nationals.
- Martin Perez - has not defeated the Arizona Diamondbacks, Atlanta Braves, Chicago Cubs, or San Diego Padres.
- Taijuan Walker - has not defeated the Arizona Diamondbacks, Milwaukee Brewers, Seattle Mariners, or Toronto Blue Jays.
