= List of Miami Marlins no-hitters =

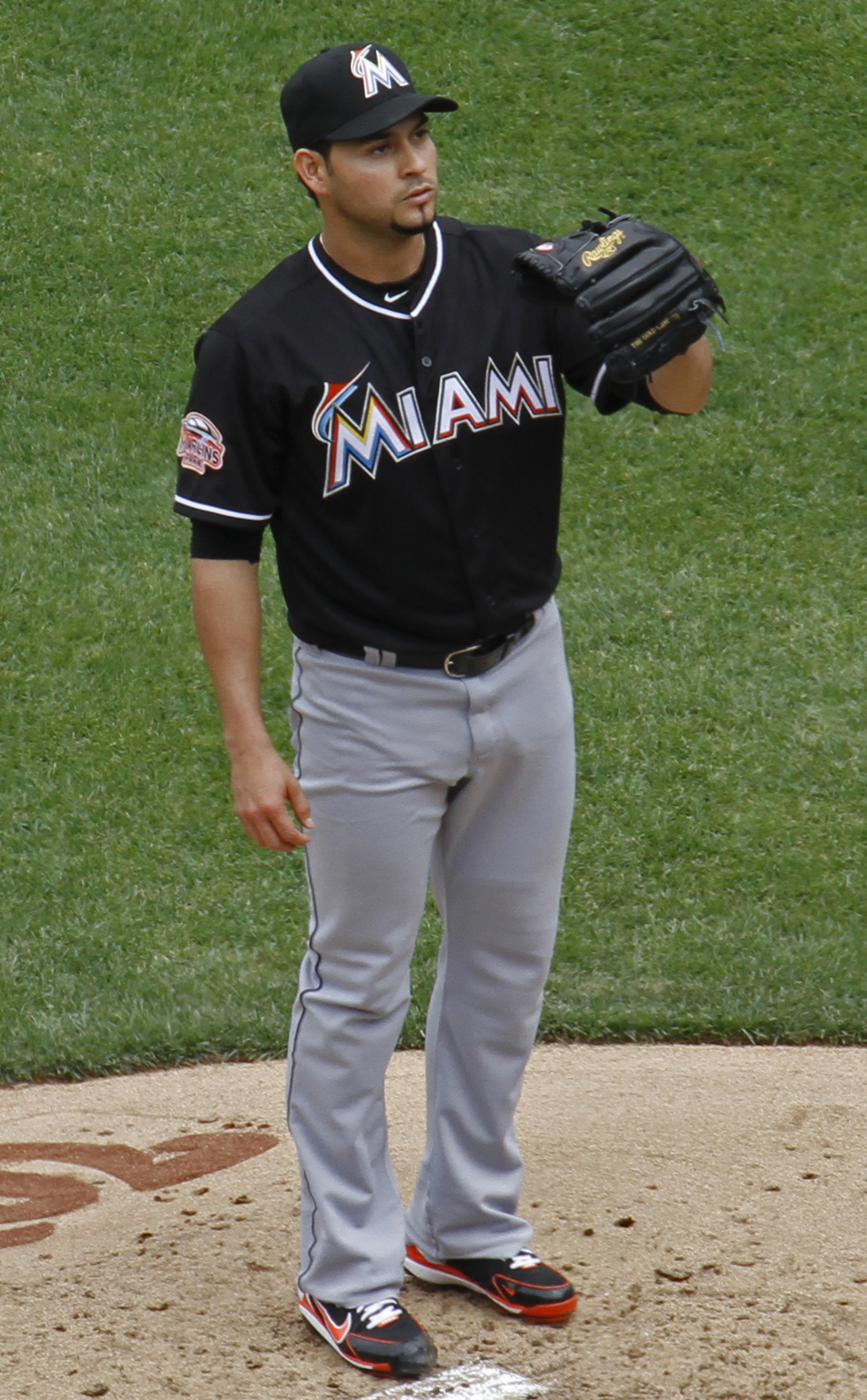
Aníbal Sánchez pitched a no-hitter for the Marlins in 2006.

The Miami Marlins are a Major League Baseball franchise based in Miami, Florida. Formed in 1993 as the Florida Marlins, they play in the National League East division. Pitchers for the Marlins have thrown six no-hitters in franchise history. A no-hitter is officially recognized by Major League Baseball only "when a pitcher (or pitchers) allows no hits during the entire course of a game, which consists of at least nine innings", though one or more batters "may reach base via a walk, an error, a hit by pitch, a passed ball or wild pitch on strike three, or catcher's interference". No-hitters of less than nine complete innings were previously recognized by the league as official; however, several rule alterations in 1991 changed the rule to its current form. A no-hitter is rare enough that it took until 2021 for all thirty teams in Major League Baseball to accomplish the feat. No perfect games, a special subcategory of no-hitter, have been thrown in Marlins history. As defined by Major League Baseball, "in a perfect game, no batter reaches any base during the course of the game."

The umpire is also an integral part of any no-hitter. The task of the umpire in a baseball game is to make any decision "which involves judgment, such as, but not limited to, whether a batted ball is fair or foul, whether a pitch is a strike or a ball, or whether a runner is safe or out… [the umpire's judgment on such matters] is final." Part of the duties of the umpire making calls at home plate includes defining the strike zone, which "is defined as that area over homeplate (sic) the upper limit of which is a horizontal line at the midpoint between the top of the shoulders and the top of the uniform pants, and the lower level is a line at the hollow beneath the kneecap." These calls define every baseball game and are therefore integral to the completion of any no-hitter.

The manager is another integral part of any no-hitter. The tasks of the manager include determining the starting rotation as well as batting order and defensive lineup every game.

== No-hitters ==
¶	Indicates a perfect game
£	Pitcher was left-handed
*	Member of the National Baseball Hall of Fame and Museum

#	Date	Pitcher	Final score	Base- runners	Opponent	Catcher	Plate umpire	Manager	Notes	Ref
1	May 11, 1996	Al Leiter^{£}	11–0	3	Colorado Rockies	Charles Johnson (1)	Steve Rippley	Rene Lachemann	First no-hitter in franchise history; First Marlins no-hitter at home; Earliest calendar date of Marlins no-hitter; First and only left-handed pitcher to throw a no-hitter in franchise history	
2	June 10, 1997	Kevin Brown	9–0	1	@ San Francisco Giants	Charles Johnson (2)	Bob Davidson	Jim Leyland	First Marlins no-hitter on the road; First right-handed pitcher to throw a no-hitter in franchise history; Only baserunner was a hit by pitch with two outs in the 8th	
3	May 12, 2001	A. J. Burnett	3–0	10	@ San Diego Padres	Charles Johnson (3)	Joe Brinkman	John Boles	9 walks, most ever in a no hitter	
4	September 6, 2006	Aníbal Sánchez	2–0	5	Arizona Diamondbacks	Miguel Olivo	Jeff Kellogg	Joe Girardi	Diamondbacks are most recent team to perform a no-hitter then suffer the following one; Final no-hitter thrown by a Marlin at Sun Life Stadium (then Dolphin Stadium at the time of no-hitter)	
5	September 29, 2013	Henderson Álvarez	1–0	3	Detroit Tigers	Koyie Hill	Ron Kulpa	Mike Redmond	Final day of regular season; Latest calendar date of Marlins no-hitter; Only run scored on a walk-off wild pitch; First no-hitter thrown at Marlins Park and first as Miami Marlins	
6	June 3, 2017	Edinson Vólquez	3–0	2	Arizona Diamondbacks	J. T. Realmuto	Bill Miller	Don Mattingly	Most recent Marlins no-hitter; 10 strikeouts, most in a Marlins no-hitter	

== See also ==
- List of Major League Baseball no-hitters
