= A. J. Burnett =

American baseball player (born 1977)

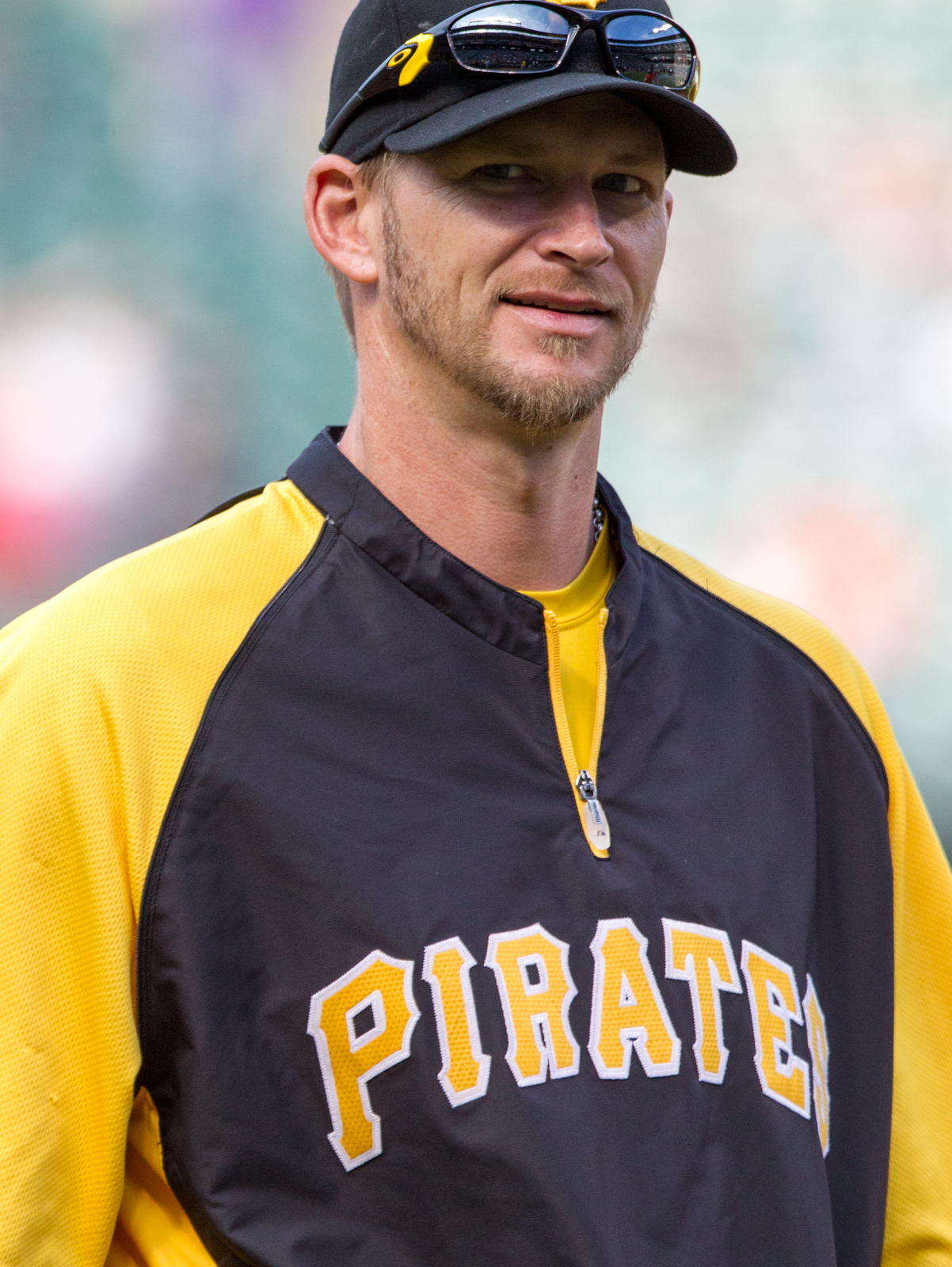
- Burnett with the Pittsburgh Pirates in 2012
- Pitcher
- Born: January 3, 1977 (age 49); North Little Rock, Arkansas, U.S.
- Batted: Right Threw: Right

MLB debut
- August 17, 1999, for the Florida Marlins

Last MLB appearance
- October 3, 2015, for the Pittsburgh Pirates

MLB statistics
- Win–loss record: 164–157
- Earned run average: 3.99
- Strikeouts: 2,513
- Stats at Baseball Reference

Teams
- Florida Marlins (1999–2005); Toronto Blue Jays (2006–2008); New York Yankees (2009–2011); Pittsburgh Pirates (2012–2013); Philadelphia Phillies (2014); Pittsburgh Pirates (2015)

Career highlights and awards
- All-Star (2015); World Series champion (2009); AL strikeout leader (2008); Pitched a no-hitter on May 12, 2001

Allan James Burnett (born January 3, 1977), is an American former professional baseball starting pitcher, who played in Major League Baseball (MLB) for the Florida Marlins, Toronto Blue Jays, New York Yankees, Pittsburgh Pirates, and Philadelphia Phillies for 17 seasons.

The New York Mets drafted Burnett in the eighth round of the 1995 MLB draft, out of Central Arkansas Christian School in North Little Rock, Arkansas, where he helped lead the team to back-to-back state championships. The Mets traded him to the Marlins, and Burnett made his MLB debut in 1999. He signed with the Blue Jays as a free agent, before the 2006 season, and with the Yankees before the 2009 season. The Yankees traded Burnett to the Pirates before the 2012 season. After two years in Pittsburgh, he signed with the Phillies, where he played one season, before rejoining the Pirates for his final season.

Burnett recorded a no-hitter in a complete game shutout in 2001, despite walking 9 batters. He led the National League (NL) in shutouts in 2002, and the American League (AL) in strikeouts in 2008. Burnett was a member of the 2009 World Series champion Yankees. He was selected for the NL roster for the 2015 MLB All-Star Game.

== Professional career ==
=== Early career ===
The New York Mets selected Burnett in the eighth round of the 1995 Major League Baseball draft. He was traded to the Marlins with Jesús Sánchez and Robert Stratton for Al Leiter and Ralph Milliard before the 1998 season when the Marlins dismantled their 1997 World Series championship roster. He was first called up to the Marlins from Class AA Portland in 1999, despite having a record of 6–12 and an ERA of 5.52 with Portland.

=== Major leagues ===
==== Florida Marlins ====
Burnett played parts of 1999 and 2000 with the Marlins; his first full regular season with the Marlins came in 2001, when he went 11–12 with an ERA of 4.05. On May 12, 2001, Burnett pitched a no-hitter against the San Diego Padres in a 3–0 victory, striking out seven and walking nine. His game-worn cap and a baseball from the game are on display at the National Baseball Hall of Fame and Museum. On September 7, 2001, Burnett threw a warm-up pitch that accidentally struck the window of a moving pick-up truck.

In 2002, he held an ERA of 3.30 and finished with a 12–9 record and 203 strikeouts, career bests that he did not top until 2008, as well as leading the majors with five complete game shutouts. He threw the fastest fastball of all major league starters in 2002, averaging 94.9 miles per hour (152.7 km/h).

In 2003, Burnett was limited to four starts before missing the rest of the season due to Tommy John surgery. He spent the postseason on the injured reserve list until the Marlins won the World Series against the Yankees. He returned in June 2004 and made 19 starts for the Marlins, going 7–6 with an ERA of 3.68. Even during 2004, his first season back from surgery, he was able to throw 100 mph (160 km/h). He was shut down for most of September 2004 due to a less serious elbow injury.

The 2005 season was Burnett's last with the Marlins before he became eligible for free agency. As former teammate Carl Pavano had done in the 2004 off-season, he wanted to test the market. Additionally, the Marlins did not offer him a long-term contract. Since he was likely to price himself out of the Marlins' budget, he was sought after by several other teams before the July 31 trade deadline, but the team ended up not trading him.

Burnett seemed to be pitching his best games of the season right around the trade deadline. After he took the loss in the Marlins' first game after the All-Star break, dropping his record to 5–6, he strung together seven consecutive wins. The last of those wins was on August 19, when he pitched eight shutout innings against the Los Angeles Dodgers. He then lost six consecutive decisions, including four losses in five starts (with an ERA in that span of 5.93) during the Marlins' failed wild-card chase in September, to close out the season with a 12–12 record despite a 3.44 ERA.

On September 27, 2005, Burnett was asked by the Marlins to leave the team. The request came a day after he made comments criticizing the organization: "We played scared. We managed scared. We coached scared", he told reporters following the Marlins' 5–3 loss at Turner Field. "I'm sick of it, man. It's depressing around here. A 3–0 ballgame, I give up one run and leave guys on base, it's like they expect us to mess up. And when we do, they chew us out. There is no positive, nothing around here for anybody."

Marlins manager Jack McKeon called Burnett into his office and broke the news. Burnett shook his hand, gathered up his belongings, and left. Burnett has since apologized, saying:

"I have always been a very passionate player and person. I often wear my emotions on my sleeve, sometimes for better, sometimes for worse. I hope that my teammates always respect that of me, as I trust they know my commitment to winning. For those I've offended, I offer my most sincere apologies."

Because of his dismissal from the team, Burnett finished the season one inning short of receiving a $50,000 bonus for pitching 210 innings during the season; in addition, he was only two strikeouts shy of having his second 200-strikeout season of his career. After Burnett's contract with the Marlins expired, general manager Larry Beinfest did not attempt to re-sign him, which was unlikely to happen anyway, given Florida's financial constraints and the market for Burnett.

He threw the fastest fastball of all major league starters in 2005, averaging 95.6 mph (153.9 km/h).

Burnett had criticized McKeon for not allowing the team's less experienced players to have much playing time. Although probably not because of Burnett's comments, McKeon decided to let rookie Josh Johnson, a September call up from the Double-A Carolina Mudcats, make the first major league start of his career on September 30, 2005. Previously, Burnett was scheduled to make his last start of the year at that game.

Burnett declared free agency on October 27, the day after the end of the 2005 World Series.

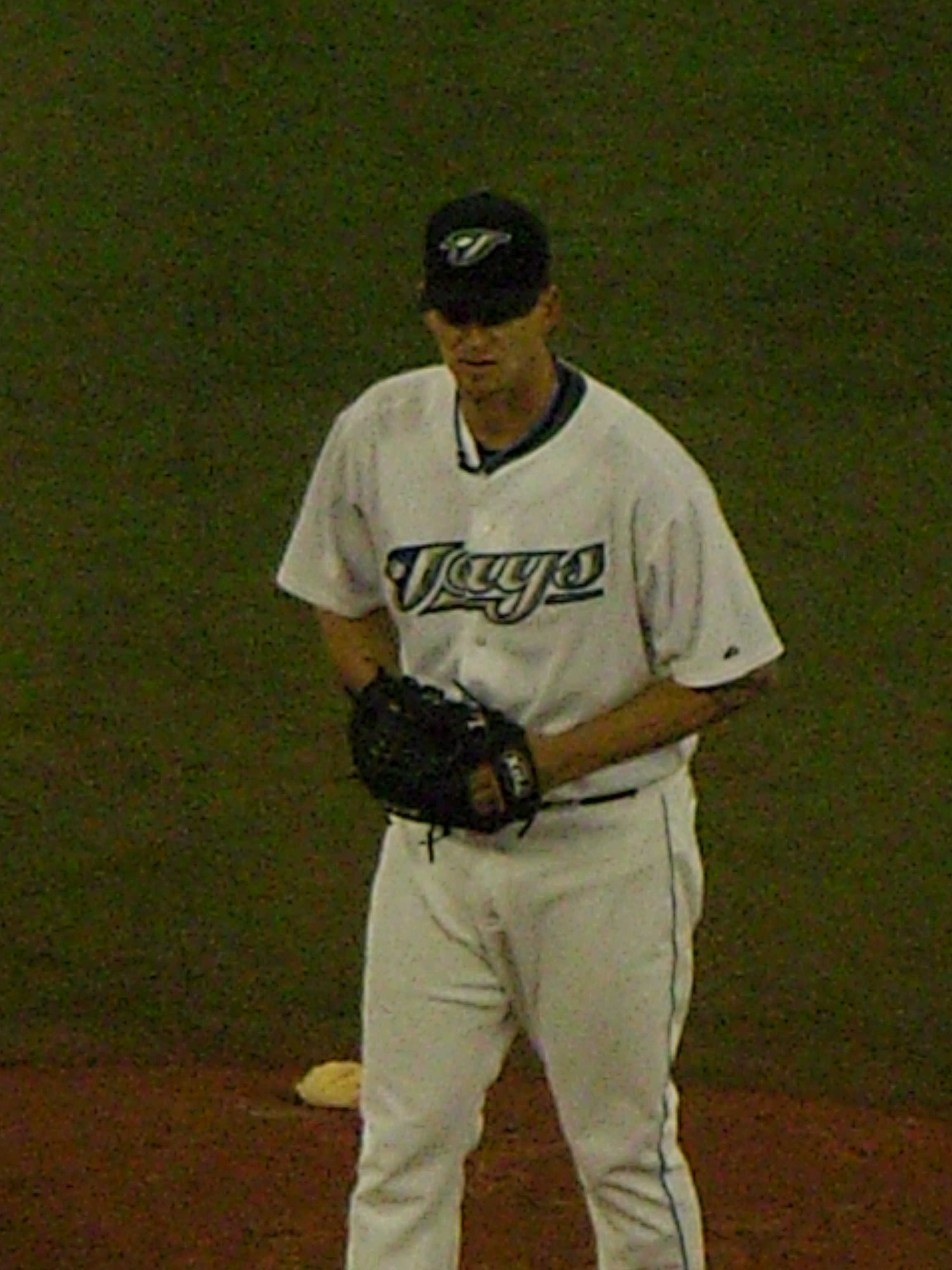
Burnett pitching for the Blue Jays in 2008.

==== Toronto Blue Jays ====
On the morning of December 6, 2005, at the Baseball Winter Meetings, the Toronto Blue Jays signed Burnett to a five-year, $55 million deal.

The Blue Jays took a chance by signing Burnett despite his propensity to injury, and the 2006 season began with him going on the disabled list when a piece of scar tissue—remnants of his Tommy John surgery—broke off in his pitching arm. However, some baseball commentators like RotoWorld and Tim Dierkes still considered the signing worthwhile, since many of the other free agent pitchers that year, like Matt Morris and Paul Byrd had less impressive career stats, even though they had fewer health risks.

Burnett was activated on April 15, 2006 and made his first start with the Blue Jays that day against the Chicago White Sox, giving up four runs in six innings of work to earn the loss. In his next start, against the Boston Red Sox, Burnett was removed from the game after only four innings due to soreness in his right arm. He would end up on the disabled list again, this time for over two months. Burnett finished the 2006 year on a strong note however, finishing the season with a 10–8 record and a 3.98 ERA.

After opening the 2007 season with a very poor outing against the Detroit Tigers, lasting only two innings and allowing five hits and six runs (27.00 ERA), Burnett settled down in his next four starts, finishing April 2–1, with an ERA of 4.18.

The Blue Jays experienced a number of injuries early, including losing All-Star closer B. J. Ryan for the season due to an elbow injury, and Opening Day starter Roy Halladay to an appendectomy for four weeks. Burnett was the only pitcher to make all his starts through the first two months of the season. In that period, Burnett posted a 3.98 ERA, throwing 71.0 innings. Burnett missed 48 games during two stints on the disabled list, finishing the 2007 season 10–8 with an ERA of 3.75.

The 2008 season started off with frustration for Burnett due to a right index finger injury he suffered during the offseason, the nail of the index finger partially torn after it was caught in a closing car door.

Against Chicago White Sox pitcher Javier Vázquez in early September at U.S. Cellular Field, Burnett took a no-hitter into the sixth inning before giving up a hard hit that bounced off Scott Rolen's glove but got the win. Vazquez himself also pitched well, not giving up a hit until the fourth inning but ultimately took the loss.

On September 24, in Burnett's final start of the season (number 34), he pitched against the Yankees, lasting eight innings, giving up two runs (one earned), seven hits and striking out 11, to finish off the season with an AL-leading 231 strikeouts. When he was relieved in the beginning of the ninth inning, he received a very long and memorable standing ovation and came out for a curtain call after being congratulated by the players. Despite his outing, he was awarded a no-decision, and the Jays lost 6–2 in extra innings.

Burnett finished the 2008 season with an 18–10 record and established career highs in almost every single pitching category. He set a career high with 18 wins, appeared in 35 games while starting 34 games, pitched 221 1/3 innings, and led the American league with 231 strikeouts. His 34 starts also led the AL, and he threw curveballs a higher percentage of the time than any other AL starter; 29.2%. His five-year contract with the Blue Jays allowed him to opt out at the end of the 2008 season, and he chose to do so, becoming a free agent.

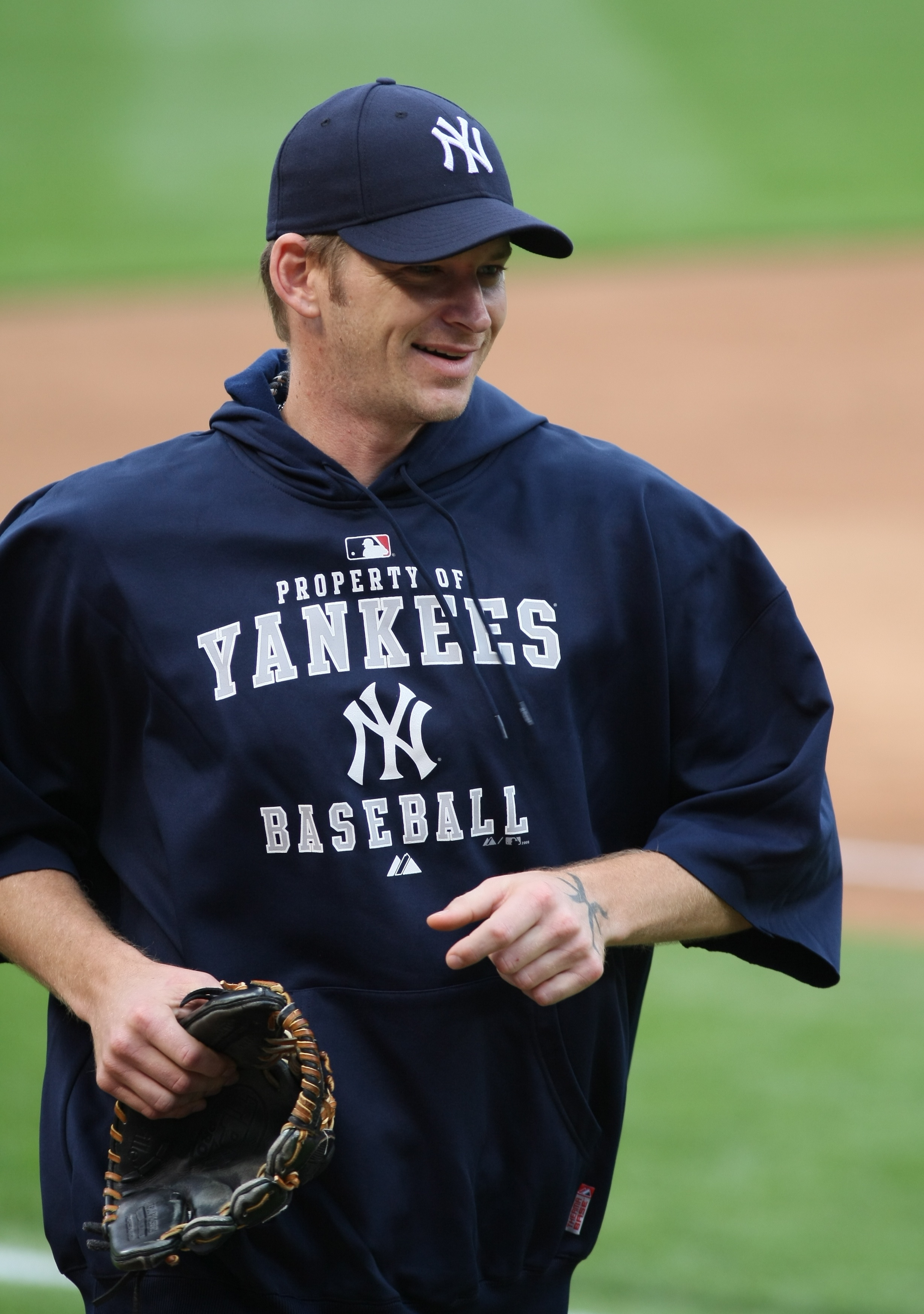
Burnett with the Yankees in 2009.

==== New York Yankees ====
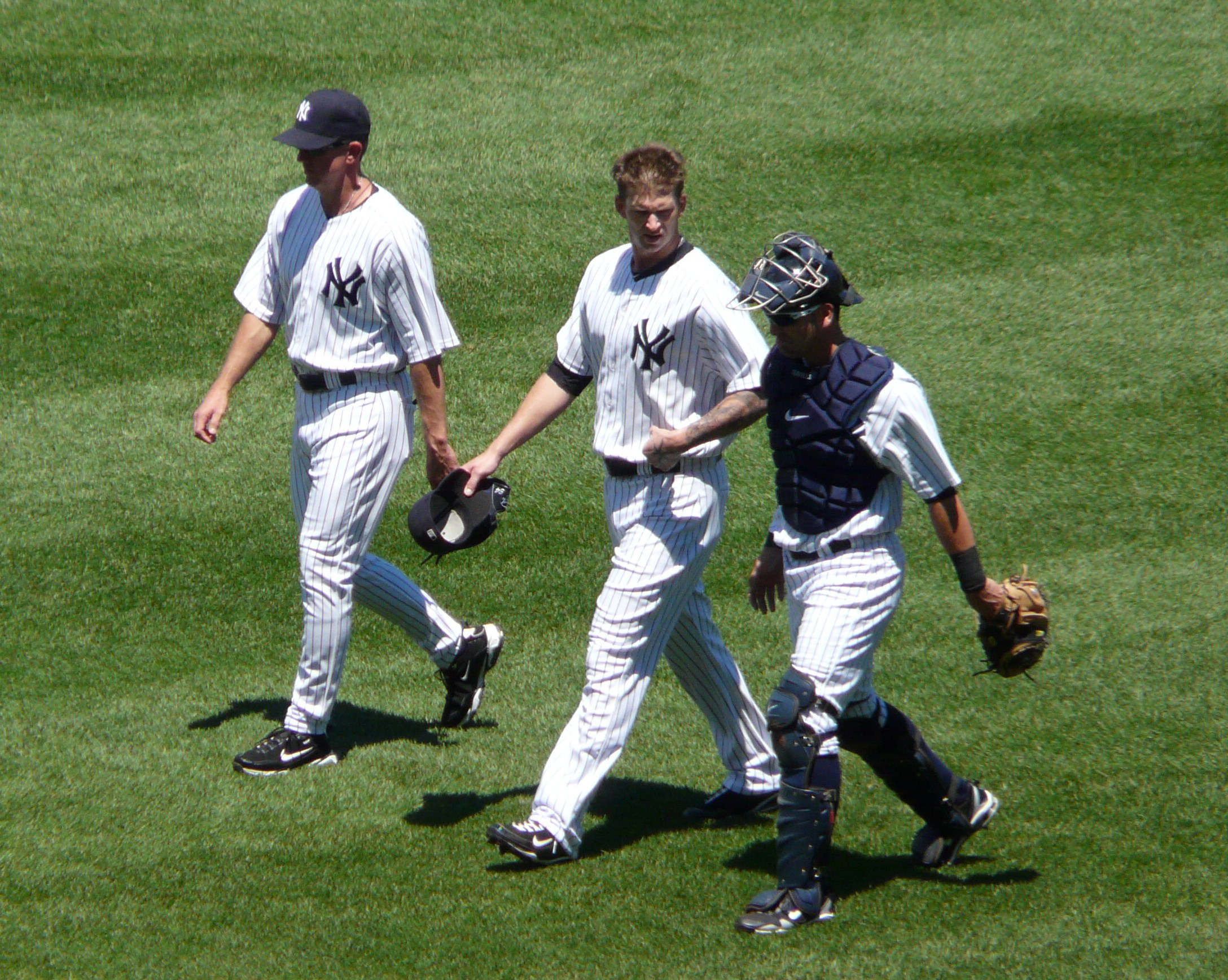
AJ Burnett (center) leaves the bullpen, flanked by pitching coach Dave Eiland and catcher Francisco Cervelli

On December 18, 2008, Burnett signed a five-year $82.5 million contract with the New York Yankees. On June 20, 2009, in the third inning of a game against the Florida Marlins, he pitched an immaculate inning, striking out all three batters on three pitches each. He became the 39th major-league pitcher to achieve this feat.

On October 9, 2009, Burnett made his postseason debut in a win against the Minnesota Twins in Game 2 of the American League Division Series, in which he earned a no-decision. On October 17, he pitched a no-decision in Game 2 of an American League Championship Series win against the Los Angeles Angels of Anaheim. Burnett made his first World Series start in Game 2 against the Philadelphia Phillies on October 29, and earned his first career post season win by pitching seven innings, recording nine strike-outs and allowing only one run. However, in Game 5, he set a record when he hit Shane Victorino in the first inning, his fifth hit batter of that postseason. The Yankees would go on to win their 27th franchise championship by beating the Phillies in 6 games, giving Burnett his second career championship ring.

Burnett started the 2010 season with a 6–2 record through the end of May. However, during the time Yankees pitching coach Dave Eiland took a leave of absence for a few weeks, Burnett's numbers plummeted in June where he went winless. Burnett broke his winless streak upon Eiland's return, but lost again to the Tampa Bay Rays in his first start after the All-Star break, a game where he injured his hand after punching a door out of frustration. He finished the season with a 10–15 record, an ERA of 5.26, and a WHIP of 1.51, all career worsts.

Burnett struck out four batters in one inning, becoming the first Yankee to accomplish this rare feat. This occurred in the sixth inning of a game against the Colorado Rockies on June 24, 2011.

In the 2011 American League Division Series against Detroit, the Yankees, facing elimination, turned to Burnett to pitch Game 4 at Comerica Park. Burnett threw 5 2/3 innings, giving up just one run despite four walks, and the Yankees won 10–1, shifting the series back to Yankee Stadium for a decisive Game 5. The Yankees ended up falling to the Tigers, 3–2, in that contest. Burnett's 2011 season was not much better than his 2010 campaign, as he finished with a record of 11–11, a 5.15 ERA, and a WHIP of 1.44.

During his Yankees tenure, he was known for celebrating walk-off victories with a "pie in the face" celebration. Burnett would fill a towel with whipped cream, sneak up behind the player who was responsible for the walk-off hit, and slam the "pie" in their face.

==== Pittsburgh Pirates ====
During the offseason the Yankees expressed interest in trading Burnett. Burnett reportedly invoked his no-trade clause to block a deal that would have sent him to the Los Angeles Angels of Anaheim for Bobby Abreu. On February 18, the Yankees agreed to trade Burnett, along with $20 million to cover most of the remaining $33 million on his contract, to the Pittsburgh Pirates for minor leaguers Exicardo Cayones and Diego Moreno.

On March 1, 2012, Burnett was injured during batting practice, taking a bunt to the right cheek bone. The orbital fracture required surgery to determine the extent of the injury and duration of recovery, and it was reported that Burnett would be out for at least two to three months. On April 6, Burnett began his rehab stint pitching for the Pirates High-A affiliate, the Bradenton Marauders. He made his first start for the Pirates on April 21 against the St. Louis Cardinals.

Burnett became a key component of the Pirates success early in the 2012 season. On June 28, 2012, Burnett became the first Pirates pitcher since Dock Ellis in 1974 to win eight games in a row, moving his record to 9–2 with a 3.31 ERA. He also became a leader in the clubhouse, using his experience to groom the young Pirates pitching staff. Heading into the All-Star break, Burnett had a 10–2 record, 3.68 ERA and the Pirates had won 12 games in a row in which Burnett was the starting pitcher.

On July 31, 2012, Burnett pitched a complete game one-hitter in a win against the Chicago Cubs at Wrigley Field. Burnett came within four outs of pitching his second career no-hitter, but gave up a pinch-hit single with two outs in the eighth inning to rookie Adrian Cardenas, who was called up earlier that day. He improved his record to 13–3, the first time in his career his pitching record was 10 games above .500 and second-best win total of his career. On August 5, Burnett was named the NL Player of the Week for the first time since 2005. On September 23, Burnett became the first Pirates' pitcher to win at least 15 games in a single season since Todd Ritchie (15–9) in 1999. Burnett would finish his first season in Pittsburgh with a record of 16–10, ERA of 3.51, 202.1 innings pitched with 180 strikeouts and 62 walks (his lowest number of walks since his injury shortened 2006 season), and a WHIP of 1.241.

On August 16, 2012, Burnett was pitching in an afternoon game at PNC Park against the Los Angeles Dodgers. In an earlier at-bat, Hanley Ramirez hit a home run and performed a celebration right after rounding second base by using his index fingers and thumbs to form circles over his eyes while looking over at his teammates. Burnett thought that Ramirez was "showing him up" and became upset by the gesture. In Ramirez' next at-bat, Burnett struck him out to end the inning and then, while walking back to the Pirates dugout, yelled at Ramirez to "sit the fuck down." The exchange was captured on AT&T SportsNet Pittsburgh, and fans immediately realized what was said. "Sit the F*** Down" became a hashtag, meme, rallying cry, and t-shirt all around Pittsburgh. The phrase helped to establish a clothing brand, Pittsburgh Clothing Company, that still operates today.

On April 1, 2013, Burnett tied Bob Veale (1965) and John Candelaria (1983) for the franchise's opening day record with 10 strikeouts in a 3–1 loss to the Chicago Cubs. On June 13, Burnett was placed on the 15-day DL due to a Grade 1 calf tear; he returned on July 7. Burnett would finish the 2013 season with a 10–11 record despite an ERA of 3.30 in 30 games started, 192 innings pitched with 209 strikeouts (his most since 2008 and the second highest season total of his career) and 67 walks, and a WHIP of 1.215. After the Pirates were eliminated from the postseason, Burnett stated that he would either return to Pittsburgh, or retire. Burnett remained a free agent as spring training got underway, and this is when he made his decision to play, rather than retire. Although he decided to play, it would not be with the Pirates. Burnett signed a contract with the Philadelphia Phillies.

==== Philadelphia Phillies ====
On February 16, 2014, Burnett signed a one-year, $15 million contract with the Philadelphia Phillies. The deal included a mutual option for the 2015 season and a limited no-trade clause. On April 27, 2014, it was revealed that Burnett was diagnosed with an inguinal hernia. He received a cortisone shot to see if he could forgo surgery until the end of the season. He ended the 2014 season 8–18 with a 4.59 ERA. His 96 walks issued and 18 losses each led the Major Leagues.

On November 3, 2014, Burnett declined his $12.75 million player option, making him a free agent. This came a day after his mutual option of $15 million was declined by the Phillies and Burnett.

==== Return to Pittsburgh ====
On November 14, 2014, Burnett signed a one-year, $8.5 million contract to return to the Pirates, announcing that the 2015 season would be his last. On July 6, 2015, he was selected for his first All-Star team. On July 11, in a game against the Cardinals, Burnett hit a solo shot, his fourth career home run. Burnett was placed on the 15-day DL with elbow inflammation on July 31 and returned to the active roster on September 10.

On September 10, Burnett made his first start in Pittsburgh since his injury in July. To his surprise, a Bat-Signal appeared in the sky at PNC Park above the Pittsburgh Renaissance Hotel and in various other locations Downtown. Burnett, a Batman fan, said after the game the moment was "by far the coolest thing that's happened" in his career.

== Pitching style ==
Burnett threw four pitches. His main pitches were a four-seam fastball and sinker at 91–94 mph, as well as a knuckle curveball at 80–83. Less frequently, he also threw a changeup to left-handed hitters at 87–89 mph. The curve is especially good for swinging strikes with its 44% whiff rate for Burnett's career. The changeup has also been good for getting groundouts — it has a ground ball/fly ball ratio of better than 5:1.

Burnett faced considerable control problems in his career. He led the major leagues in wild pitches twice and hit batters once. However, Burnett was also a good strikeout pitcher; he led the American League with 231 strikeouts in 2008.

Burnett was also prone to fielding issues. He committed 39 errors in the majors, six more than any other pitcher during his playing career, and his .912 fielding percentage was below average.

== Accomplishments ==
- Led American League with 231 strikeouts (2008)
- Led National League in shutouts (five, 2002)
- Pitched a 3–0 no-hitter against the San Diego Padres (at Qualcomm Stadium, on May 12, 2001). He ceded 10 free passes in this game (nine walks, and one hit batsman.)
- Matched his own franchise single-game record by striking out 14 batters in just six innings in a July 6, 2005, 12-inning 5–4 win against the Milwaukee Brewers, in which the Marlins struck out a team record 22 batters and retired 28 straight batters.
- Fifth all-time on the Florida and Miami Marlins' with 49 wins and 753 strikeouts, second all-time with complete games (14), and tied for first in shutouts (8, matched by Dontrelle Willis)
- With 38 wins between the two in 2008, Burnett (18–10) and Roy Halladay (20–11) set a new franchise record for most wins in a season by a duo, beating out the 37 wins between Jack Morris and Juan Guzmán in the 1992 season.
- First Yankee in team history to have four consecutive strikeouts in one inning (at Yankee Stadium on June 24, 2011)
- First right-hander in Pittsburgh Pirates history to record 200 strikeouts in a single season (2013)

== Personal life ==
Burnett graduated from Central Arkansas Christian Schools. He was raised Catholic. His off-season home is in Monkton, Maryland.

He got his first tattoo, a drawing of his pitching motion on his left calf, while playing in the minors, and later added others including an Aztec symbol that can be seen on his right leg in a Blue Jays commercial and an image of Bruce Lee on his left triceps. Burnett had his nipples pierced and wore nipple rings.

Early in his career, Burnett named his bats after Marilyn Manson songs.

Burnett and his wife, Karen, have two children, Ashton and A. J. Jr. In December 2010, it was reported on ESPN that Burnett and his wife were divorcing. Burnett denied the report.

In April 2020, Burnett worked with Pittsburgh Clothing Company to create a shirt to promote social distancing during the COVID-19 pandemic. The shirts read "Stay The F*** Home", a tribute to his famous slogan from 2012, but now used to urge folks to self-quarantine to prevent spreading of the virus.

== See also ==
- List of Major League Baseball annual shutout leaders
- List of Major League Baseball annual strikeout leaders
- List of Major League Baseball career games started leaders
- List of Major League Baseball career hit batsmen leaders
- List of Major League Baseball career strikeout leaders
- List of Major League Baseball career wild pitches leaders
- List of Major League Baseball no-hitters
- List of Major League Baseball single-inning strikeout leaders
- List of Miami Marlins no-hitters
- List of Miami Marlins team records
- 2021 Baseball Hall of Fame balloting

Awards and achievements
Preceded by Hideo Nomo	No-hitter pitcher May 12, 2001	Succeeded by Bud Smith
Preceded by Randy Johnson	NL hits per nine innings 2002	Succeeded by Kerry Wood
