= Max Scherzer =

American baseball player (born 1984)

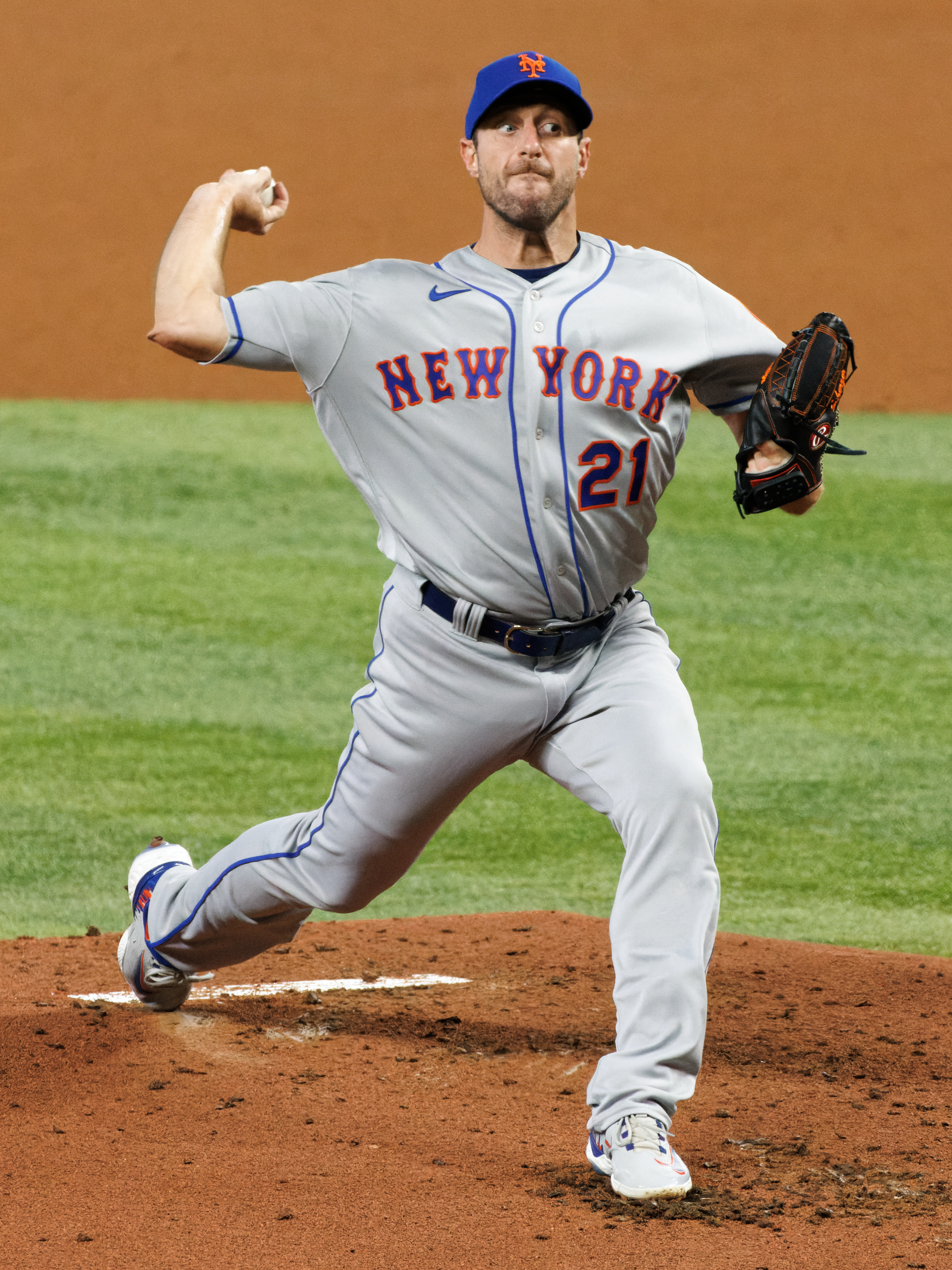
- Scherzer with the New York Mets in 2023

Free agent
- Pitcher
- Born: July 27, 1984 (age 42); St. Louis, Missouri, U.S.
- Bats: Right Throws: Right

MLB debut
- April 29, 2008, for the Arizona Diamondbacks

MLB statistics (through 2026 season)
- Win–loss record: 225–126
- Earned run average: 3.29
- Strikeouts: 3,557
- Stats at Baseball Reference

Teams
- Arizona Diamondbacks (2008–2009); Detroit Tigers (2010–2014); Washington Nationals (2015–2021); Los Angeles Dodgers (2021); New York Mets (2022–2023); Texas Rangers (2023–2024); Toronto Blue Jays (2025–2026)

Career highlights and awards
- 8× All-Star (2013–2019, 2021); 2× World Series champion (2019, 2023); 3× Cy Young Award (2013, 2016, 2017); 2× All-MLB First Team (2019, 2021); 4× wins leader (2013, 2014, 2016, 2018); 3× NL strikeout leader (2016–2018); Pitched two no-hitters in 2015 (June 20 and October 3); MLB record 20 strikeouts in a 9-inning game (tied)

Maxwell Martin Scherzer (born July 27, 1984), nicknamed "Mad Max", is an American professional baseball pitcher who is a free agent. He has played in Major League Baseball (MLB) for the Arizona Diamondbacks, Detroit Tigers, Washington Nationals, Los Angeles Dodgers, New York Mets, Texas Rangers, and Toronto Blue Jays. A right-handed starting pitcher, Scherzer is an eight-time MLB All-Star, has won three Cy Young Awards, has pitched two no-hitters, and is a two-time World Series champion, winning with the Nationals in 2019 and the Rangers in 2023. He is regarded as one of the best pitchers in baseball history.

The Arizona Diamondbacks selected Scherzer with the 11th overall pick of the 2006 amateur draft. He made his MLB debut with the Diamondbacks in 2008. In December 2009, Scherzer was traded to the Detroit Tigers. During his five-year tenure in Detroit, Scherzer made the American League All-Star Team twice and won the 2013 American League Cy Young Award. Scherzer also helped the Tigers win four consecutive American League Central titles from 2011 to 2014. In 2015, Scherzer signed with the Washington Nationals, and became the fifth pitcher in Major League history to record multiple no-hitters in a single season. On May 11, 2016, in a game against the Tigers, he tied the major league nine-inning single-game strikeout record with 20, making him the second player to achieve both a no-hitter and 20 strikeouts over nine innings. In that same game, Scherzer became the youngest pitcher to beat all 30 MLB teams. Scherzer won the NL Cy Young Award in 2016 and 2017, and made the National League All-Star Team five times with the Nationals.

In the 2019 World Series, against the Houston Astros, Scherzer earned a win in Game 1, and started Game 7, which the Nationals also won (Scherzer received a no-decision) for their first World Series championship. Scherzer was traded to the Dodgers in 2021 where they reached the 2021 NLCS, and he finished 3rd in NL Cy Young voting. As a free agent, he signed with the Mets and was named to the All-MLB Team at the conclusion of the 2022 season. Midway into the 2023 season, Scherzer was traded to the Rangers, where he started Games 3 and 7 of the 2023 ALCS against the Astros, and Game 3 of the 2023 World Series as the Rangers won their first championship.

Scherzer is the fifth pitcher to start an All-Star Game for both the American and National Leagues. He is a four-time wins leader and a winner of three strikeout titles. One of the most consistent hurlers of his era, he made at least 30 starts each season from 2009 to 2018 and struck out at least 230 batters in each season from 2012 to 2019. In 2017, he became the third-fastest player ever to record 2,000 career strikeouts and the fourth to strike out 250 or more in four consecutive seasons. Scherzer recorded more wins (161) and strikeouts (2,452) than any pitcher in the 2010s. He joined the 3,000 strikeout club on September 12, 2021, and has struck out the ninth most all-time. In 2023, he became only the fourth pitcher in Major League history to win multiple World Series championships, win multiple Cy Young Awards, throw multiple no-hitters, and earn multiple All-Star selections; the others are Hall of Famer Sandy Koufax, Tim Lincecum and former teammate Justin Verlander. Scherzer is currently the oldest active player in Major League Baseball. On June 10, 2026, Scherzer became the eleventh pitcher in Major League Baseball history to record 3,500 career strikeouts.

== Early life ==
Scherzer was born in St. Louis, the son of Jan (Shirck) and Brad Scherzer, and grew up in the suburb of Chesterfield, Missouri. He grew up a St. Louis Cardinals fan. Scherzer played baseball, football, and basketball as a student at Parkway Central High School, which is in his hometown. What he lacked in raw talent, he made up for with the fiercely competitive nature that distinguished his athletic career. One of his high school coaching influences was basketball coach Rick Kirby, who stressed fundamentals and was defense-oriented. Marty Maier, then the Cardinals' scouting director, selected him in the 43rd round (1,291st overall) of the 2003 Major League Baseball (MLB) draft. However, he did not sign and instead attended the University of Missouri in Columbia.

== College career ==
Early in his time at Missouri, Scherzer exerted so much effort in his windup that his head whip constantly caused his cap to fall off. One of Scherzer's coaches at Missouri, Tony Vitello, had helped to recruit him, and eventually persuaded him to pitch with more balance and control and to stop leaping at hitters, which frequently caused him to miss up and in to right-handed batters. He did not pitch the final 50 days of his freshman season, choosing instead to focus on working out and doing long toss, while gaining velocity in the process. Vitello and head coach Tim Jamieson trained him in a drill to balance on his back leg with more coordination and not to fall over his front foot. Scherzer modified his delivery and worked constantly over the following winter, leading to a 1.86 earned run average (ERA) and 131 strikeouts in 106 innings pitched over 16 games during his sophomore season.

After his freshman year at the University of Missouri in 2004, Scherzer played with the La Crosse Loggers of the Northwoods League (NWL), a collegiate summer baseball league. He went 2–1 that summer with a 1.91 ERA with six saves. He also struck out 50 batters in only 33 innings pitched. He was named a mid-season All-Star.

As a sophomore with Missouri in 2005, Scherzer won the Big 12 Pitcher of the Year Award.

On January 9, 2012, it was announced that Scherzer would be inducted into the University of Missouri Intercollegiate Athletics Hall of Fame.

== Professional career ==
=== Draft and minor leagues ===
The Arizona Diamondbacks chose Scherzer in the first round with the 11th overall pick of the 2006 MLB draft, making him Missouri's first-ever MLB first-round draft pick.

Mike Rizzo, the Diamondbacks' scouting director, marveled that Scherzer attacked hitters with a relentlessness that he had never seen. Seven pitchers were selected ahead of him, including Luke Hochevar (first overall pick), Brandon Morrow, Clayton Kershaw, and Tim Lincecum. Scouting reports criticized Scherzer for too violent of delivery, but Rizzo and other Arizona scouts decided that "the combination of his arm action and his pitching IQ and his attack mode... we were calling him 'Mad Max' in the draft room. He came at you. He looked angry. He looked mad."

==== 2007 ====
Scherzer and agent Scott Boras had initial difficulty negotiating a contract with the Diamondbacks; as such, Scherzer did not sign the summer he was drafted. Instead, Scherzer began his professional baseball career with the Fort Worth Cats of the independent American Association. He stated that "It was my decision" and "I've never second guessed it.” He appeared in only three games for the Cats, in which he pitched a total of 16 innings, earning a 1–0 record with 25 strikeouts and an ERA of 0.56.

Scherzer later agreed to a four-year, $4.3 million contract with the Diamondbacks, reportedly signing with them just before midnight on the club's May 30 deadline.

Scherzer began playing in the Diamondbacks organization with the Class A Advanced Visalia Oaks. In his first start on June 7 with the team, he struck out 8 and allowed just one run on 2 hits over five innings. The following start, Scherzer pitched seven perfect innings and had 13 strikeouts. He did not finish the game due to a pitch limit, but told reporters he believed he “would have gotten the perfect game if I had stayed in.”

Scherzer pitched just one more start for the Oaks before being promoted to the Double-A Mobile BayBears at the end of June that year. With the BayBears, he posted a 3.91 ERA over 14 starts while striking out 76 in 73 2/3 innings.

During the 2007 offseason, Scherzer was named the fourth-best prospect in the Diamondbacks organization.

==== 2008 ====
After a good start to the 2008 season with the Triple-A Tucson Sidewinders, Scherzer was promoted to the major leagues for the first time on April 27, 2008.

=== Arizona Diamondbacks (2008–2009) ===
==== 2008 ====
On April 29, 2008, Scherzer made his MLB debut against the Houston Astros when he came on in relief and struck out the first batter he faced, Jack Cassel. He threw 4 1/3 perfect innings while striking out seven. In the process he set the record for the number of consecutive batters retired (13) for a pitcher making his MLB debut as a reliever. The previous record was 12 set in 1962 by the Los Angeles Dodgers' Pete Richert. The seven strikeouts that he had in the appearance were one short of the MLB record for most in a debut relief appearance. The Pittsburgh Pirates' Barry Jones had eight on April 20, 1986.

On April 30, 2008, the Diamondbacks announced he would be part of the starting rotation, due to his impressive debut. In his first appearance as a starter for the D-Backs, Scherzer allowed five runs (two earned) in four innings, while striking out five, taking the first loss of his major league career. He returned to the bullpen for much of the 2008 season. For the season, he was 0–4 with a 3.05 ERA in 16 games (seven starts) and struck out 66 batters in 56 innings.

Scherzer participated in the 2008 Arizona Fall League season as a member of the Phoenix Desert Dogs.

==== 2009 ====
He became a full-time starter in 2009, filling the fifth starter role in the starting rotation. He recorded his first major league victory in a 12–0 win over the Atlanta Braves on May 16, 2009. On May 26, Scherzer recorded the second win of his career. He finished the 2009 season with 30 starts, a 9–11 record, 4.12 ERA, and 174 strikeouts in 170 1/3 innings pitched.

=== Detroit Tigers (2010–2014) ===
On December 9, 2009, Arizona traded Scherzer along with Daniel Schlereth, Phil Coke, and Austin Jackson to the Detroit Tigers as part of a three-team agreement which sent Ian Kennedy and Edwin Jackson to the Diamondbacks and Curtis Granderson to the New York Yankees.

In Detroit, Scherzer grew from a hard thrower with control issues into an ace, teaming with fellow right-hander and future Cy Young Award-winner Justin Verlander to front the Tigers' starting rotation for five seasons. A third-place finish in 2010 left them out of the playoffs, but was followed by four consecutive AL Central division championships. The run culminated with Detroit winning the 2012 American League (AL) pennant, only to fall to the San Francisco Giants in the World Series.

==== 2010 ====
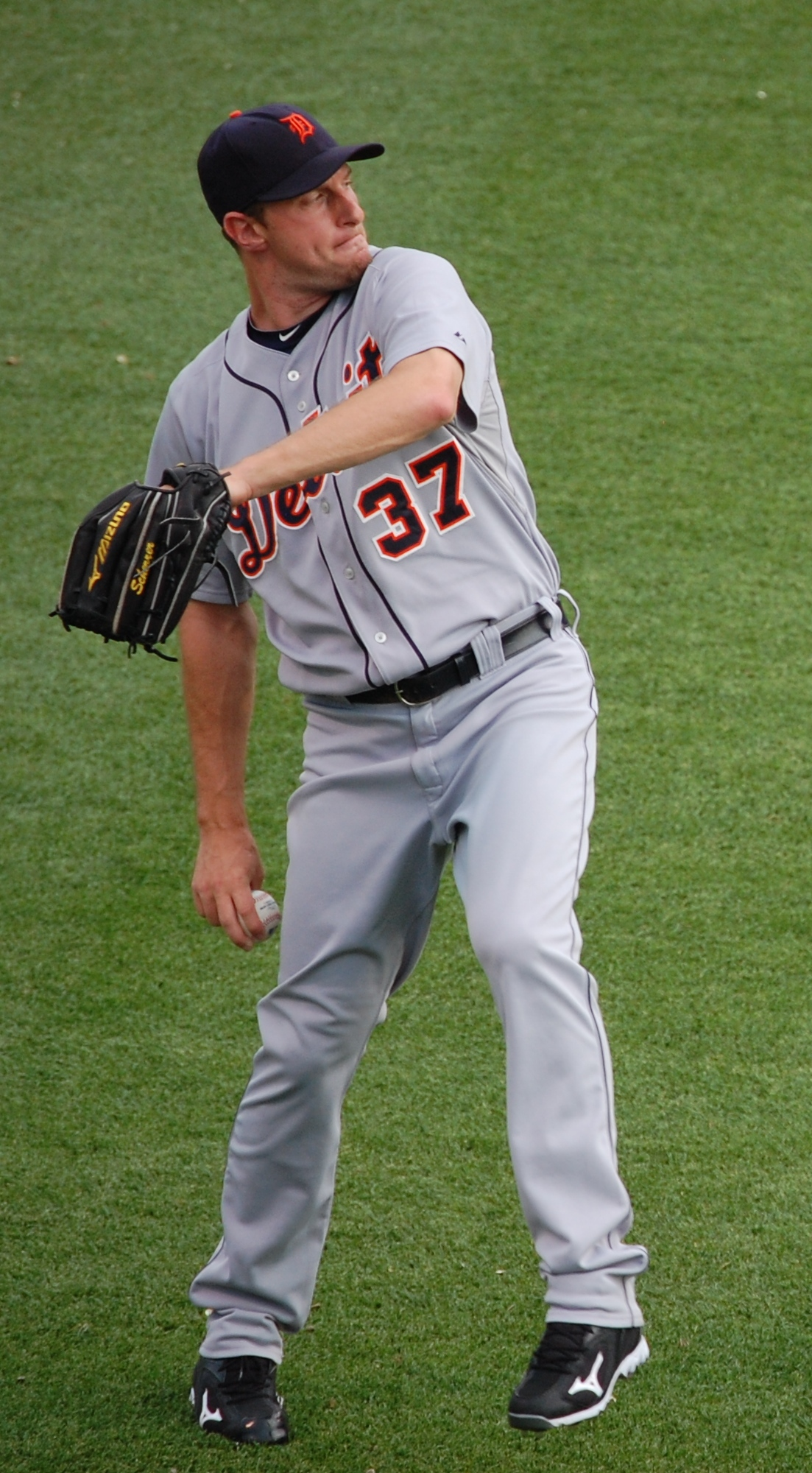
Scherzer warms up before a game in 2010

Detroit optioned Scherzer to the Triple-A Toledo Mud Hens on May 16, replacing him with Armando Galarraga. On May 30, Scherzer was called back up and made his first start back in a game versus the Oakland Athletics later that day. Scherzer accumulated 14 strikeouts in 5 2/3 innings pitched. He allowed two hits, four walks, and hit a batter on his last pitch. Scherzer was tied for the most strikeouts in Comerica Park history with Jeremy Bonderman, and tied for second in franchise history behind Mickey Lolich, who had 16 strikeouts in one game. On July 26, Scherzer and Tampa Bay Rays pitcher Matt Garza dueled for a no-hitter into the sixth inning. After 5 2/3 hitless innings, Scherzer lost the no-hit bid, shutout, and game after serving up a grand slam to Matt Joyce. Meanwhile, Garza opportunely secured the no-hitter in a 5–0 Tampa win. Scherzer struck out eight.

On September 1 against the Minnesota Twins, Scherzer pitched into the ninth inning for the first time in his career. He gave up one run on four hits and one walk while striking out nine on 107 pitches, though he received a no-decision as the Tigers lost the game in the tenth inning.

Scherzer finished the 2010 season with a 12–11 record, 3.50 ERA, and 184 strikeouts. Despite spending some time in the minor leagues, his strikeout total was still good for tenth in the American League.

==== 2011 ====
In the 2011 season, Scherzer was the third starter in the rotation, and won six straight starts early in the year, being the first Tiger since Jeremy Bonderman in 2006 to accomplish the feat. Scherzer finished the season with a 15–9 record and was third in the AL in home runs allowed (29), fourth in wild pitches, fifth in hits by pitch (10), ninth in winning percentage (.625), and tenth in wins.

==== 2012 ====
On May 20, 2012, Scherzer struck out 15 Pittsburgh Pirates in seven innings, falling one strikeout short of tying Lolich's franchise record. Scherzer surpassed the 200-strikeout mark for the first time, totaling 231 during the regular season to place second in the league to teammate Verlander with 239. Scherzer's strikeout rate per nine innings (11.1) both surged into the double-digit range and led the AL for the first time. He finished the regular season with other then-personal bests in wins and winning percentage (16–7; .696). In four seasons spanning 2009–12, Scherzer was 52–38, 3.94 ERA, 1.302 WHIP, averaging 9.2 strikeouts per nine innings and 191 strikeouts per season.

Despite battling a late-season injury, Scherzer pitched successfully for the Tigers in the 2012 postseason, after they had won the AL Central division. He made three starts, going 1–0 with a 2.08 ERA, while striking out 26 batters over 17 1/3 innings. The Tigers reached the World Series, for the first of Scherzer's career, and opposed the San Francisco Giants. He started Game 4, yielded three earned runs in 6 1/3 innings while striking out eight batters, and received a no-decision as the Tigers lost the game in extra innings, 4–3.

==== 2013: First Cy Young Award ====
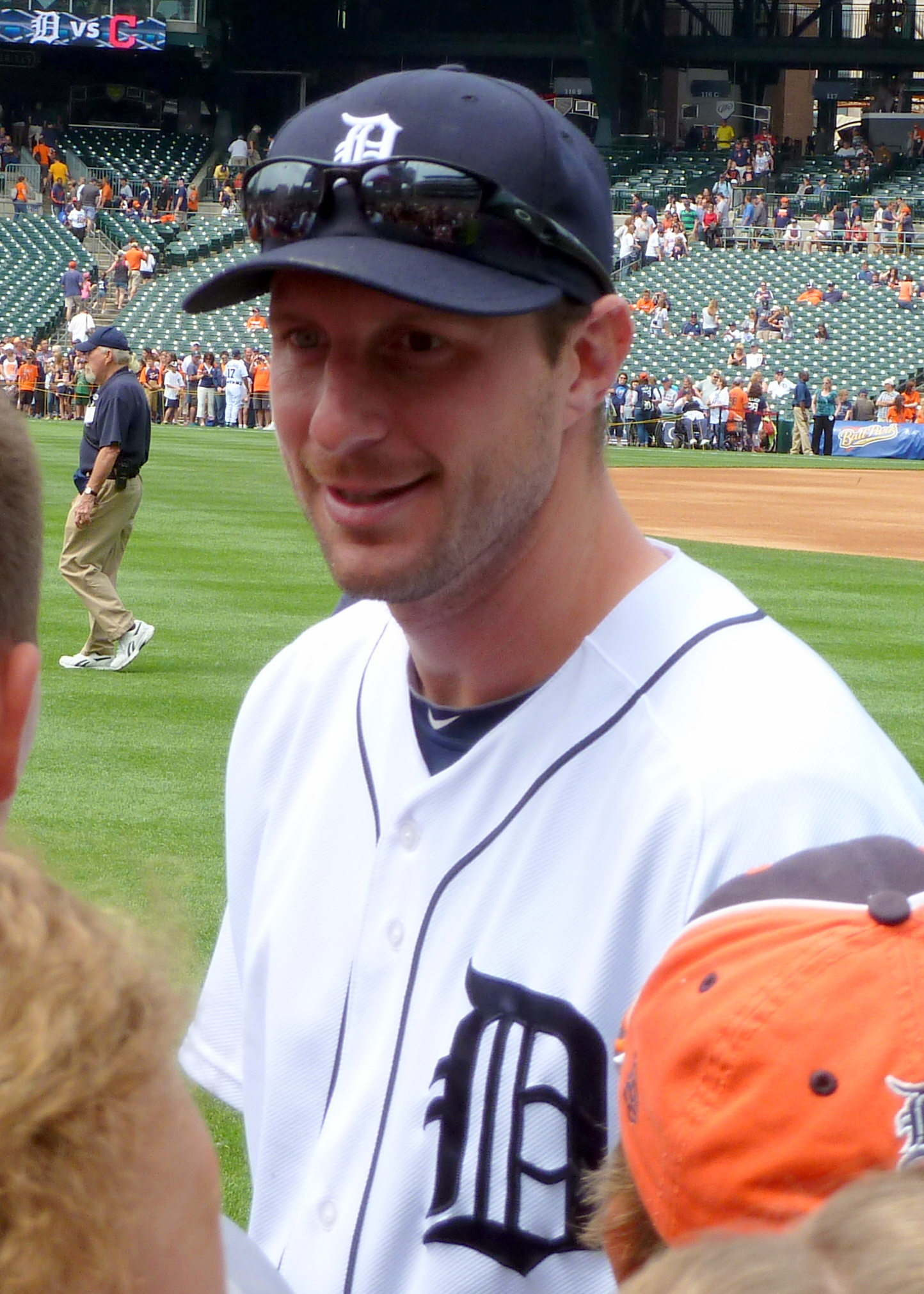
Scherzer during his tenure with the Detroit Tigers in 2013

After a win against the Tampa Bay Rays on June 28, 2013, Scherzer became the first Tigers pitcher to ever start a season 12–0, surpassing the 11–0 start from George Mullin in 1909. With a win against the Toronto Blue Jays on July 3, Scherzer became the first major league starter to begin a season 13–0 since Roger Clemens in 1986. The streak ended with a loss to the Texas Rangers on July 13.

On July 1, Scherzer was selected by player vote to represent the American League in the 2013 All-Star Game, his first major league All-Star selection. On July 15, Jim Leyland, who managed the AL All-Star team this season and was also the Tigers manager, announced that he had chosen Scherzer as the AL's starting pitcher. Entering the All-Star break, Scherzer had a 13–1 record, 3.19 ERA, 0.98 WHIP, and 152 strikeouts in 129 2/3 innings pitched. He pitched a perfect 1–2–3 inning in the game, including striking out Joey Votto for one of three outs.

On August 8, Scherzer recorded his 1,000th career strikeout when he fanned Jason Kipnis of the Cleveland Indians. With a win over the New York Mets on August 24, Scherzer became the third pitcher in major league history to start a season 19–1, following Clemens in 2001 and Rube Marquard in 1912.

On September 20, after a 12–5 win over the Chicago White Sox, Scherzer became the first major league pitcher of the season to reach 20 wins, making him the first Tigers pitcher to reach 20 wins since Justin Verlander in 2011, and the 45th time in Tigers history that a pitcher reached 20 wins in a season. He finished the regular season at 21–3, with a league-leading 0.97 WHIP, 2.90 ERA, and a career-high 240 strikeouts. He was the only 20-game winner in the majors in 2013. Scherzer's stellar season earned him the 2013 AL Cy Young Award, receiving 28 of 30 first-place votes. He also was the winner of the Players Choice Award for AL Outstanding Pitcher, and the Baseball Digest Pitcher of the Year—bestowed annually to one pitcher in the major leagues.

Scherzer had a dominant performance in Game 1 of the 2013 ALDS versus the Oakland Athletics, recording 11 strikeouts and giving up just one hit through the first six innings, before surrendering a two-run homer to Yoenis Céspedes. He finished with seven innings pitched, giving up three hits, as he and the Tigers won the game, 3–2. He struck out each of Josh Donaldson, Brandon Moss, and Josh Reddick twice. Scherzer was in line to make a Game 5 start in the same series, but facing elimination in Game 4, manager Jim Leyland chose to bring him in as a reliever in the seventh inning. Scherzer gave up the go-ahead run in the top of the inning, but the Tigers regained the lead in the bottom of the frame. Then he loaded the bases with no outs in the top of the eighth but wriggled out of trouble by striking out Josh Reddick and Stephen Vogt, then he got Alberto Callaspo to line out to center field. The Tigers won the game, and Scherzer earned the victory to go to 2–0 in the series.

Scherzer continued his brilliance into the 2013 ALCS against the eventual World Series champion Boston Red Sox. In Game 2, he no-hit Boston for 5 2/3 innings before surrendering two hits and a run in the bottom of the sixth. He left the game with a 5–1 lead after seven innings, striking out 13. However a quartet of Tiger relievers blew the lead in the eighth inning on a grand slam by David Ortiz, and Boston won it, 6–5, on a walk-off single in the ninth. Scherzer was the losing pitcher in the Tigers' 5–2 loss in Game 6, the deciding and final game of that series.

==== 2014 ====
On January 17, 2014, Scherzer and the Tigers agreed on a $15.525 million salary for the 2014 season, avoiding arbitration for the third straight year.

On May 5, Scherzer struck out nine Houston Astros batters in eight innings of a 2–0 victory. It was his seventh straight game from the start of the season with at least seven strikeouts, establishing a Detroit Tigers franchise record. The streak ended on May 10 against the Minnesota Twins, when he struck out six batters in six innings. The Major League record for consecutive 7+ strikeout games to start the season is nine, accomplished by Bob Feller in 1946.

On June 12, in his 179th career start, Scherzer pitched both his first career complete game and shutout in a three-hit, 4–0 win versus Chris Sale and the Chicago White Sox. Scherzer struck out eight batters and expended 113 pitches in the contest. It was the longest expanse any major league starter had gone without a complete game since 1900. On 18 previous occasions, he had endured at least eight innings, including one for nine that eventually required extra innings to finish, precluding credit for a complete game.

On July 6, Scherzer was named to his second AL All-Star team by way of manager John Farrell's selection. He pitched a scoreless fifth inning, surrendered a double to Troy Tulowitzki, and struck out Yasiel Puig and Paul Goldschmidt. Scherzer earned the win for the AL.

Scherzer finished the 2014 season with an 18–5 record, 3.19 ERA and 1.175 WHIP. New career bests prevailed, including in innings (220 1/3) and strikeouts (252). His 18 wins tied for the AL lead along with Corey Kluber and Jered Weaver. Max made his only postseason appearance of 2014 in Game 1 of the ALDS against the Baltimore Orioles. He was tagged with the loss after surrendering five runs (all earned) in 7 1/3 innings.

=== Washington Nationals (2015–2021) ===
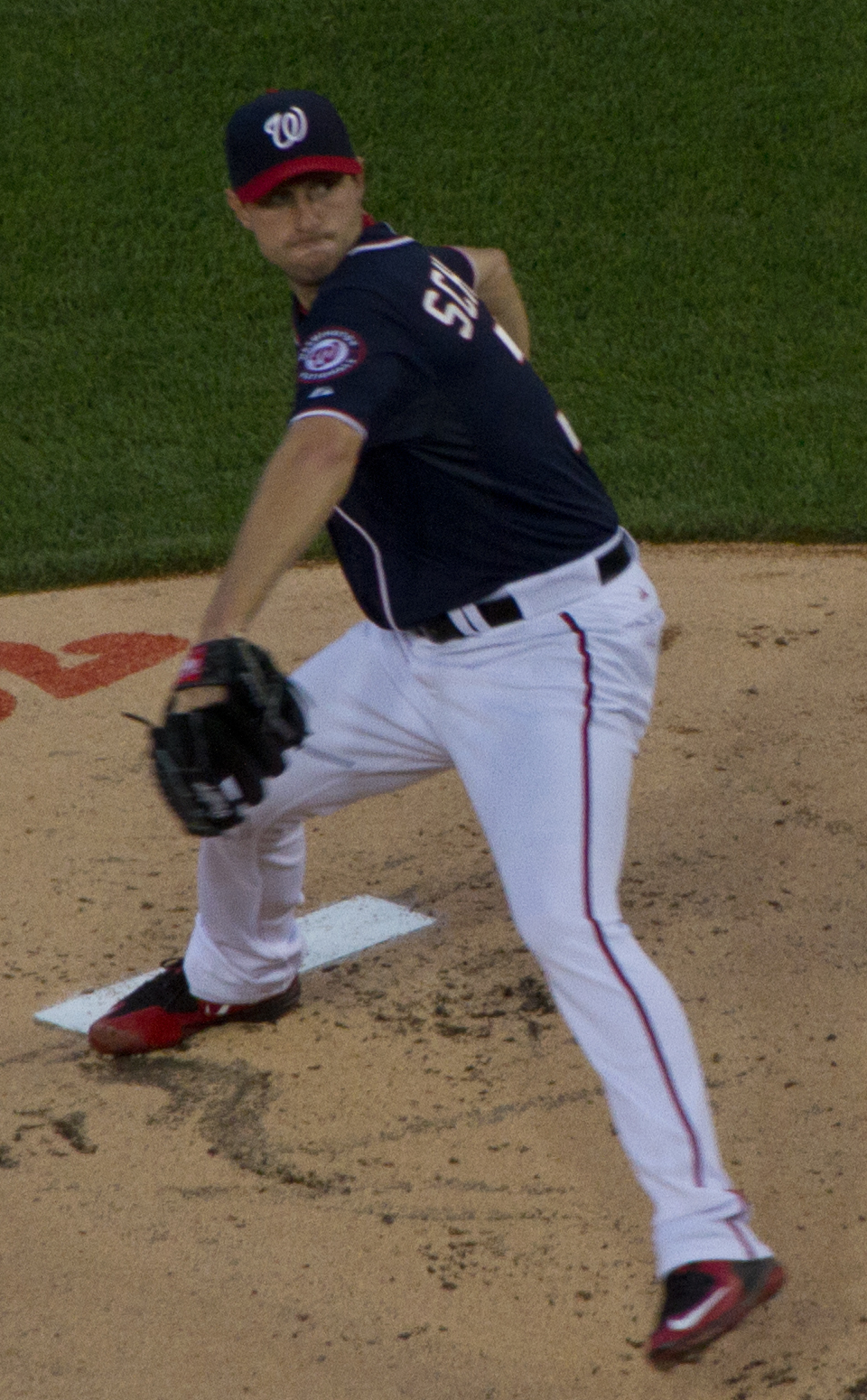
Scherzer pitching in 2015

On January 21, 2015, Scherzer agreed to a contract with the Washington Nationals, with Mike Rizzo as the general manager. The contract was for seven years and $210 million ($285.2 million today); it included a $50 million signing bonus to be paid out over 14 years, the largest deferral in MLB history. At the time, Scherzer owned a 91–50 W–L with a 3.58 ERA in seven seasons with Arizona and Detroit. On January 22, it was reported that the contract also specified for Scherzer's salary to be $10 million in 2015, and $15 million in each of the next three seasons. It increases to $35 million a year in 2019, 2020, and 2021, the seasons in which his deferrals begin. In addition, his contract includes several award incentives, as well as a no-trade clause.

==== 2015: Two no-hitters ====
Scherzer made his regular season debut for the Nationals as their Opening Day starting pitcher versus the New York Mets on April 6, 2015. He struck out eight over 7 2/3 innings in a 3–1 loss. On June 14, 2015, he pitched his second career complete game, ceding one hit and one walk in a 4–0 shutout against the Milwaukee Brewers at Miller Park. He accrued six perfect innings before Carlos Gómez, leading off the seventh inning, fought off a 96 miles per hour (154 km/h) fastball for a bloop single to right field inches past the outstretched glove of second baseman Anthony Rendon. Scherzer's 16 strikeouts established a new personal best and a Nationals team record for one game, surpassing Stephen Strasburg's effort of 14 versus the Pittsburgh Pirates on June 8, 2010. Rated with a game score of 100, Scherzer's mark was the 12th time in MLB history such a score or higher had been achieved.

Six days later, Scherzer no-hit the Pirates 6–0 at Nationals Park for his first career no-hitter. After retiring the first 26 batters, he came within one strike of a perfect game, only to hit the 27th batter, José Tábata, who appeared to lean into the pitch. Scherzer secured the no-hitter by retiring the next batter, Josh Harrison, on a fly ball. It was the 13th time that the 27th and presumably final batter disrupted a perfect game in progress. The game score was 97, the second occasion on the season where Scherzer had achieved a game score of at least 97. It was a feat previously accomplished just twice, first by Nolan Ryan in 1990 and then Pedro Martínez in 2000.

The 100th win of Scherzer's career occurred on June 26 in a 5–2 victory versus the Philadelphia Phillies; he allowed both runs over eight innings. It was his third consecutive start where he did not allow any baserunners for the first five innings. In June, Scherzer's ERA was 1.79 during which he was named the NL Pitcher of the Month for the second consecutive month. Spanning his last three starts in June, he registered 24 consecutive scoreless innings, retired 52 consecutive batters without allowing a hit, struck out 33, and completed 26 of a possible 27 innings.

Scherzer was selected to that year's All-Star Game via players' vote. However, he was unavailable for the game as he had already started on the Sunday before the All-Star break. Prior to the start, his season totals included a 2.12 ERA, 143 strikeouts, and two complete-game shutouts.

Over a win-less streak of seven starts beginning July 30, Scherzer allowed a 6.08 ERA, seven walks, 11 home runs, a .305/.335/.587 line against and struck out 53 in 40 innings pitched. He earned his 12th win of the season versus Miami on September 14 with eight shutout innings in a 5–0 win.

On October 3, Scherzer achieved his second career no-hitter, and second of the season, versus the Mets, striking out a new career-high 17 batters with no walks. The only base runners permitted were Kevin Plawecki via a throwing error by Yunel Escobar and Daniel Murphy via a force out of Plawecki in the same inning. Several baseball analysts and pundits debated the game as one of the greatest pitching performances of all time, and perhaps the most dominant no-hitter ever pitched, based on the number of strikeouts, lack of walks issued or hit batters, and sheer mastery of the opposing batting order the third time through the lineup. At one point, Scherzer had struck out nine consecutive Mets, just one shy of the Major League record set by Tom Seaver in 1970. It tied Nolan Ryan for most strikeouts in a no-hitter, was the first no-hitter produced with at least 17 strikeouts and no walks, and made Scherzer the sixth pitcher in MLB history to record multiple no-hitters in one season. With a game score of 104, it was the second-highest achieved on record and made Scherzer the first to achieve multiple game scores of at least 100 in the same season. That game won the 2015 Esurance MLB Award for Best Performance.

Because of his three most brilliant performances that season, Scherzer became the first to assemble three-game scores of 97 or higher in one season since at least 1914. Ryan and Walter Johnson (1918) were the only two other pitchers to carry out three-game scores of 95 or more in one season. In a season that also featured mammoth offensive accomplishments from NL Most Valuable Player (MVP) Bryce Harper, the Nationals were eliminated from the playoff contention with a week remaining.

Scherzer finished the 2015 season with a 2.79 ERA and 0.92 WHIP while striking out 276 batters against only 34 walks for an MLB-leading 8.12 K:BB ratio. He also led all major league pitchers in first-strike percentage (73.3%). Despite these exceptional numbers, Scherzer was often the victim of poor hitting support compiling only a 14–12 record.

==== 2016: Second Cy Young Award and 20-strikeout game ====
On May 11, 2016, Scherzer struck out 20 Detroit Tiger batters, to tie the record for strikeouts over nine innings in a single game, held by Roger Clemens (twice), Randy Johnson, and Kerry Wood. Scherzer became the first pitcher to strike out 20 batters in a regulation game in the 21st century. He accomplished the feat and earned the win in a matchup with former Nationals teammate Jordan Zimmermann; the final score was 3–2. Scherzer joined Johnson as the only pitchers to have performed both a 20 strikeout game and a no-hitter during their careers. Nine of the strikeouts ended on three-pitch at-bats. Of 119 total pitches discharged, 96 were for strikes; Scherzer did not deliver more than 16 in any inning. It was the first time in history that in any game of 125 or fewer pitches delivered, 96 or more were strikes. It was the third occasion that Tiger manager Brad Ausmus was on the losing side of a 20-strikeout game; the first two were as a player. It was also Scherzer's first career victory versus Detroit, positing him as the 17th hurler to earn a win against all 30 MLB teams.

On July 8, 2016, Scherzer was named to the National League squad at the All-Star Game in San Diego as a roster replacement for teammate Stephen Strasburg, who was recently activated from the DL. Scherzer performed in relief in the sixth inning, allowing no baserunners. His batting achievements for the season included a career-best 12 RBI, which ranked second among major league pitchers to Adam Wainwright with 18.

Scherzer was named the National League Cy Young Award winner on November 16, 2016, winning his second Cy Young Award on the strength of a 20–7 record, 2.96 ERA, MLB-leading 284 strikeouts, and an MLB-leading 0.968 WHIP. He became just the sixth pitcher in Major League Baseball history to win the award in both the American and the National Leagues. He won two of the 2016 Esurance MLB/This Year in Baseball Awards: for Best Pitcher, and his 20-strikeout game won for Best Performance.

==== 2017: Third Cy Young Award ====
Scherzer committed to play for Team USA in the 2017 World Baseball Classic. However, in early January 2017, he withdrew from the tournament after suffering a stress fracture in the knuckle of his right ring finger. Due to the stress fracture, which delayed his start to spring training, Scherzer was unavailable to start Opening Day for the Nationals in 2017. Nonetheless, he avoided spending any time on the disabled list to start the season. On May 14, 2017, he pitched his first career immaculate inning, striking out César Hernández, Odubel Herrera, and Aaron Altherr on nine pitches in the fourth inning versus Philadelphia. It was the 84th immaculate inning in the major leagues, and second in Nationals' history, following Zimmermann's versus the Florida Marlins in 2011. In a 2–1 win versus the Dodgers on June 6, Scherzer struck out 14. He obtained the first 10 outs of the game via strikeout despite his throwing error on a pickoff attempt, two walks allowed, and a passed ball by Matt Wieters.

On June 11, Scherzer became the third-fastest pitcher to reach 2,000 strikeouts (after Nolan Ryan and Clayton Kershaw) by striking out Nomar Mazara of the Texas Rangers. Scherzer also reached the 2,000 plateau in the third-fewest innings (1,784), behind Pedro Martínez (1,711 1/3) and Randy Johnson (1,733 1/3). Scherzer attained 7 1/3 no-hit innings versus the Marlins on June 21 until A. J. Ellis hit a comebacker that tipped off Scherzer's glove and trickled toward shortstop Trea Turner for Miami's first hit. Scherzer had struck out 11 and allowed one walk to that point in the contest. He won the NL Pitcher of the Month Award for June, allowing 14 hits and four earned runs for a 0.99 ERA throughout 36 1/3 innings through five starts. His record was 3–2 and he struck out 51 for an average of 12.63 per nine innings.

Named to his fifth MLB All-Star Game, Scherzer was NL manager Joe Maddon's selection as the squad's starting pitcher, making him the oldest starter in that lineup. He became the fifth pitcher to start at least one All-Star Game for both the American and National Leagues. At the time of his selection, he consolidated a 10–5 record and an NL-leading both with a 2.10 ERA and 173 strikeouts. The game was played at Marlins Park in Miami; he tossed 15 pitches over one scoreless inning and struck out Aaron Judge and George Springer.

On August 1, Scherzer hit his first career home run, a three-run blast off Chris O'Grady of the Marlins, but left the game shortly thereafter with neck spasms. The neck issues recurred, and the club placed Scherzer on the disabled list for the first time since 2009, retroactive to August 15. He was removed from his next start on August 18 against the San Diego Padres at Petco Park as the neck issue came back. Scherzer returned to the rotation on August 28 earning a win against the Marlins.

On September 19, Scherzer recorded 250 strikeouts for the fourth consecutive season, making him the fourth pitcher in major league history to do so, following Ferguson Jenkins, Randy Johnson, and Pedro Martínez. Scherzer rebounded from an 8–2 loss with seven runs and six walks allowed to Atlanta in his previous start, to strike out seven and with five hits and one walk allowed over seven innings in a 4–2 win, also against Atlanta.

Scherzer finished the 2017 season with a 16–6 record and a 2.51 ERA. He led the National League with 268 strikeouts, a 0.90 WHIP, and a .178 batting average against. Scherzer also became the 3rd starting pitcher in MLB history to have more than twice as many strikeouts in a season (268) as hits allowed (126) (first accomplished by Pedro Martinez in the 2000 season with 284 strikeouts and 128 hits, followed by Randy Johnson in 2001 with 372 strikeouts and 181 hits, and later also accomplished by both Gerrit Cole and Justin Verlander in 2019). Incredibly Scherzer barely missed accomplishing this ultra-rare feat in the following 2018 season, where he recorded 300 strikeouts and only 150 hits allowed. In 2017, Scherzer also led the majors in giving up the lowest percentage of hard-hit balls (26.5%).

End of season awards for Scherzer included selection as a starting pitcher on Baseball America's All-MLB Team. Scherzer also won the 2017 National League Cy Young Award—his third—making him the tenth pitcher in history to win at least three. He was the Players Choice Award winner for National League Outstanding Pitcher, the second of his career. He was also elected to the Arizona Fall League Hall of Fame in late 2017, along with Mike Trout and David Wright. He had his number 51 jersey retired by the Scottsdale Scorpions. His AFL achievements included a 2.13 ERA in eight games in 2017 and a 3.38 ERA over four starts in 2008.

==== 2018: 300 strikeouts ====
Before the 2018 season, Sports Illustrated graded Scherzer as the top pitcher, and fourth-best overall player in baseball, following Trout, Jose Altuve, and Kris Bryant. In his first 98 starts with the Nationals from 2015 to 2017, Scherzer accumulated the most innings, strikeouts, and pitching WAR. He began a game with at least five hitless innings 11 times, including successfully concluding two no-hitters. He made his third Opening Day start for Washington and struck out seven consecutive Cincinnati Reds batters on the way to a 2–0 win. He set a club Opening Day record with ten batters struck out overall. While playing Atlanta on April 9, he stole his first career base in the seventh inning, versus pitcher Peter Moylan and catcher Kurt Suzuki. On the mound, Scherzer gained a complete-game shutout, the fifth of his career. He struck out 10 and allowed two hits and no walks. He earned the NL Pitcher of the Month Award in April while leading the league in strikeouts (57) and wins (4), and ranking fourth in each of ERA (1.62), WHIP (0.82) and opposing batting average (.165). On May 6, Scherzer became the first pitcher in major league history to produce 15 strikeouts in one game in 6 1/3 innings (19 outs) or fewer, doing so versus the Philadelphia Phillies. Twelve consecutive outs occurred via strikeout, including striking out the side in the third, fourth, and fifth innings. It was the second-longest such streak in major league history, his fifth career 15-strikeout game, and the 69th with at least 10. He made his following start versus the Arizona Diamondbacks, where he struck out 11 batters and hit an RBI double for the go-ahead run in the fourth inning that furnished a 3–1 Nationals victory. In a May 19 start versus the Dodgers, Scherzer struck out 13, including dispatching his 100th of the season in 63 innings. It eclipsed Kerry Wood's record for fewest innings to reach 100 strikeouts with 65 2/3 which happened in 2001. Still the Nationals lost the game, 4–5, off a blown save by Sean Doolittle.

With a 2–0 win over Baltimore on May 30, Scherzer procured career win number 150, while striking out 12 over eight shutout innings. He was named the NL Pitcher of the Month for May—his second consecutive monthly award—after going 4–0 with a 2.21 ERA and a league-leading 63 strikeouts. Entering as a pinch hitter in the 14th inning on June 2 versus the Braves, Scherzer singled for his first career pinch-hit and scored the go-ahead run on a triple by Wilmer Difo in a 5–3 victory. In the June 5 contest versus the Tampa Bay Rays, Scherzer settled his second career immaculate inning, striking out Johnny Field, Christian Arroyo and Daniel Robertson in the sixth inning. He joined Lefty Grove, Randy Johnson, Nolan Ryan, and Sandy Koufax as the only (at the time) MLB pitchers to have recorded multiple immaculate innings in a career. Scherzer allowed both runs as earned, five hits, and finished with 13 strikeouts as the Nationals won 4–2, improving his record to 10–1, the first in the major leagues with 10 wins.

In his four next starts, Scherzer lost three times as the Nationals' offense was shut out each time. He lost another outing, 4–3, to the Boston Red Sox on July 2 while collecting his 1,000th strikeout since joining Washington. It vested him as the 11th pitcher in major league history to reach 1,000 strikeouts with two different clubs. He was selected as the NL starting pitcher in the All-Star Game, played at Nationals Park, for his third starting assignment. After allowing a home run to Aaron Judge, Scherzer became the third All-Star Game starter within the previous 30 years to strike out at least four batters. He got his 200th regular season strikeout in 2018 on July 27 versus the Marlins, retiring Justin Bour with a swinging strikeout, to gridlock with Walter Johnson and Roger Clemens with seven consecutive seasons of 200 or more strikeouts. The three trailed Seaver as the all-time leader with nine consecutive seasons.

On August 12, Scherzer pitched 7 strong shutout innings, striking out 11 while giving up just three hits and one walk during a primetime night game at Wrigley Field. Once again however, he was awarded a no-decision. Up 3–0 in the bottom of the ninth, Nationals pitcher Ryan Madson hit two batters and gave up an infield single before issuing a "golden homer" – a 2 out, 2 strike, walk-off grand slam to Cubs rookie David Bote. After the game Scherzer spoke on the loss, saying "I mean, it's a gut punch".

On September 25, Scherzer reached 300 strikeouts on the season, striking out Austin Dean of the Miami Marlins in a 10-pitch at-bat in the seventh inning of a 9–4 Nationals win.

For the 2018 season, Scherzer was 18–7 with a 2.53 ERA. He threw 3,493 pitches, more than any other major league pitcher. He finished second in Cy Young Award voting, behind Jacob deGrom.

==== 2019: World Series champion ====
Scherzer started for the Nationals on Opening Day 2019 against Jacob deGrom of the Mets at Nationals Park.

On April 26, Scherzer became the 35th pitcher in Major League history to record 2,500 career strikeouts, getting Manuel Margot of the San Diego Padres looking on three pitches in the seventh inning. He became the third-fastest to achieve the feat based on innings pitched (2155 1/3), trailing Johnson and Martínez.

On June 18, Scherzer suffered a broken nose after a ball struck him in the face while bunting in batting practice. Nevertheless, he made his scheduled start the next day against the Philadelphia Phillies. With discoloration near his right eye, he threw 117 pitches and struck out 10 Phillies hitters over seven scoreless innings as the Nationals won 2–0. In a start on June 30, he faced his former team, the Detroit Tigers. It was the first time he pitched against Detroit at Comerica Park since joining the Nationals, and the first since the 20-strikeout game in 2016. This time, he struck out 14 while allowing four hits over eight innings in a 2–1 win for his 90th career double-digit strikeout game.

En route to a historic performance, Scherzer went 6–0 over six starts and 45 innings in June. He became the fourth pitcher since 1920 to post an ERA of 1.00 or lower while logging at least 68 strikeouts in one calendar month. It was also the first time since 1908 that any pitcher had struck out at least 68 batters while issuing five or fewer walks in one calendar month. After producing two more games with at least 10 strikeouts and no walks issued, Scherzer had authored 24 such contests, third-most in history. He was named NL Pitcher of the Month for the sixth time.

Scherzer was named to the National League team at the All-Star Game in Cleveland, his seventh consecutive all-star selection. He spent time on the injured list starting in July due to bursitis in his right scapula and a strain on the right rhomboid muscle in his upper back.

Over 27 total starts and 172 1/3 IP, Scherzer concluded 2019 with an 11–7 record, 2.92 ERA, 144 hits allowed, 1.027 WHIP, and 243 strikeouts. He led all major league pitchers in strikeouts/walks ratio, at 7.364, and Fielding Independent Pitching (FIP), at 2.45. He also led the NL in SO/9, at 12.7. He finished third in the league in strikeouts and fifth in adjusted ERA.

Scherzer started the NL Wild Card Game against the Milwaukee Brewers. He pitched five innings and gave up home runs to Yasmani Grandal and Eric Thames. The Nationals came back to defeat the Brewers, 4–3. The win allowed them to advance to the NLDS to face the Dodgers. Scherzer was the winning pitcher in Game 4 in a 6–1 outcome, and the Nationals won the series in five games.

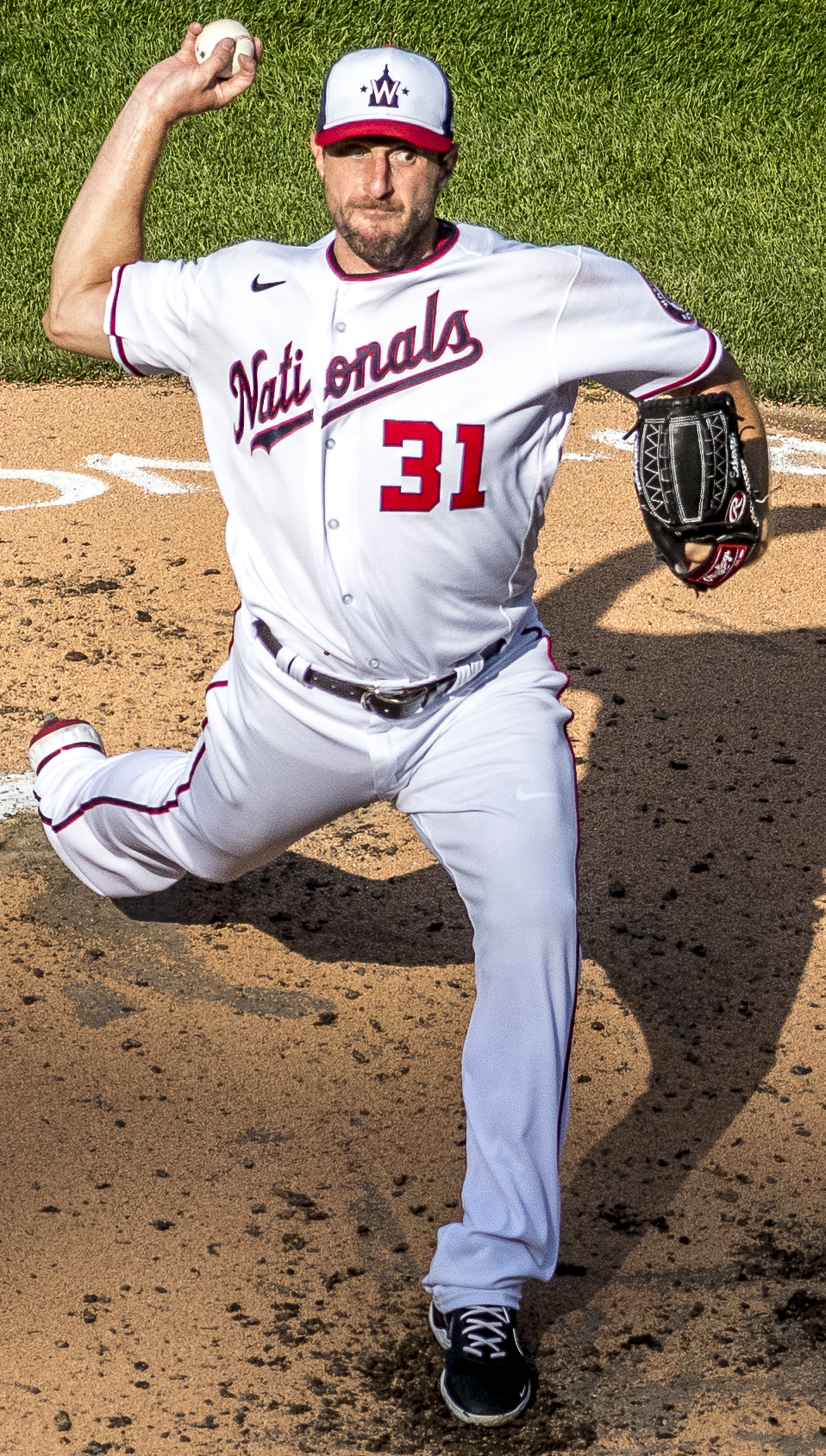
Scherzer with the Nationals in 2021

After the NLDS, the Nationals advanced to the National League Championship Series (NLCS) to face the St. Louis Cardinals, where Scherzer received the starting assignment for Game 2. In Game 1, starter Aníbal Sánchez lost a bid for a no-hitter with two outs in the eighth. In Game 2, Scherzer took his own no-hitter into the seventh inning before allowing a leadoff single to Paul Goldschmidt. The performances mirrored a feat Sánchez and Scherzer had achieved as teammates while playing in Detroit in Games 1 and 2 of the 2013 ALCS versus the Boston Red Sox. Both pitchers started their respective games with five hitless innings. No other pair of starting pitchers had ever taken no-hitters into the sixth inning against the same team in consecutive postseason games.

The Nationals advanced to the World Series to face the American League pennant-winning Houston Astros. This championship quest aligned Scherzer against old rotation mate Justin Verlander, that year's AL Cy Young winner. However the pair did not face each other directly in any starts. Scherzer started Game 1 in Houston, giving up two runs over five innings and earning the win. He was scheduled to start Game 5 at Nationals Park but was scratched due to severe neck spasms, for which he received a cortisone shot. Scherzer instead started the decisive Game 7 in Houston, again giving up two runs over five innings. He got a no-decision as the Nationals came back to win the game and the Series. It was the first championship in franchise history and first for Scherzer.

Another end-of-season recognition for Scherzer included selection to the first team of the inaugural All-MLB Team as one of five starting pitchers. He finished third to deGrom and Hyun-jin Ryu in the NL Cy Young Award voting.

==== 2020: COVID shortened year ====
In the pandemic-shortened 2020 season, Scherzer posted a 5–4 record with a 3.74 ERA, his highest since 2011, and 92 strikeouts over 67 1/3 innings in 12 starts. His 1.38 WHIP was also the highest of his career.

==== 2021: Last year in Washington ====
During a May 2, 2021, contest versus the Marlins, Scherzer pitched his first complete game of the season, allowing one run–on a home run to Isan Díaz in the ninth inning–while striking out nine and allowing no bases on balls. On May 8, Scherzer faced the New York Yankees, striking out 14 over 7 1/3 innings, allowing two hits, one run and one walk. It was the 100th double-digit strikeout game of his career, making him just the fifth pitcher to reach the milestone, following Nolan Ryan, Roger Clemens, Randy Johnson, and Pedro Martínez. The 14 strikeouts established a record by an opposing pitcher of the then-current iteration of Yankee Stadium, opened in 2009.

On September 16, after he had been traded, Scherzer was named by his former club as their nominee for the season's Roberto Clemente Award, recognizing character, community involvement, and philanthropy for his family's contributions to the Washington, DC, area.

=== Los Angeles Dodgers (2021) ===
On July 30, 2021—the day of the MLB trade deadline—with the Nationals under .500 and Scherzer in the final year of his contract, Scherzer was traded to the Los Angeles Dodgers along with Trea Turner in exchange for Josiah Gray, Keibert Ruiz, Donovan Casey, and Gerardo Carrillo. Scherzer made his Dodgers debut on August 4 in Los Angeles against the Houston Astros, pitching seven innings and giving up two runs and striking out 10 batters, and earned the win.

On September 12 at Dodger Stadium, Scherzer struck out Eric Hosmer in the fifth inning in a contest versus the San Diego Padres to become the 19th pitcher to reach 3,000 strikeouts. In the second inning of the same game, Scherzer achieved his third immaculate inning, tying Sandy Koufax and Chris Sale for the most immaculate innings thrown in a major-league career. Additionally, Scherzer had taken a perfect game into the eighth inning until Hosmer doubled to deep right field with one out. On September 13, Scherzer was named NL Player of the Week. It was the sixth time in his career that he earned Player of the Week honors. In his first nine starts with the Dodgers, Scherzer allowed five earned runs in 58 innings for a 0.78 ERA. He finished the 2021 season with a 15–4 record and led all qualified pitchers with a 0.86 WHIP and a .185 batting average against. He started for the Dodgers in the Wild Card Game against the St. Louis Cardinals, pitching 4 1/3 innings, while allowing one run on three hits in a game the Dodgers eventually won 3–1 on a walk-off homer.

As the starting pitcher in Game 3 of the NLDS versus the San Francisco Giants, Scherzer completed seven innings in a 1–0 losing effort, allowing only Evan Longoria's solo home run in the fifth inning. It was the Dodgers' first loss with Scherzer on the mound. Pitching on two days' rest, he earned his first major league save on October 14 in Game 5 of the NLDS, to seal a 2–1 series clinching victory. He started in Game 2 of the NLCS against the Atlanta Braves, pitching 4 1/3 innings and allowing two runs on four hits while striking out seven. He remarked after the game that he felt like his arm was dead in the game and was unable to properly get loose. He was scheduled to start again in Game 6 but was scratched from the game because he was still dealing with arm soreness. As his contract signed with the Dodgers expired, Scherzer became a free agent following the World Series.

Scherzer was named the Sporting News NL Starting Pitcher of the Year, and Players Choice Award winner for NL Outstanding Pitcher. He placed third in the NL Cy Young Award balloting receiving six first-place votes.

=== New York Mets (2022–2023) ===
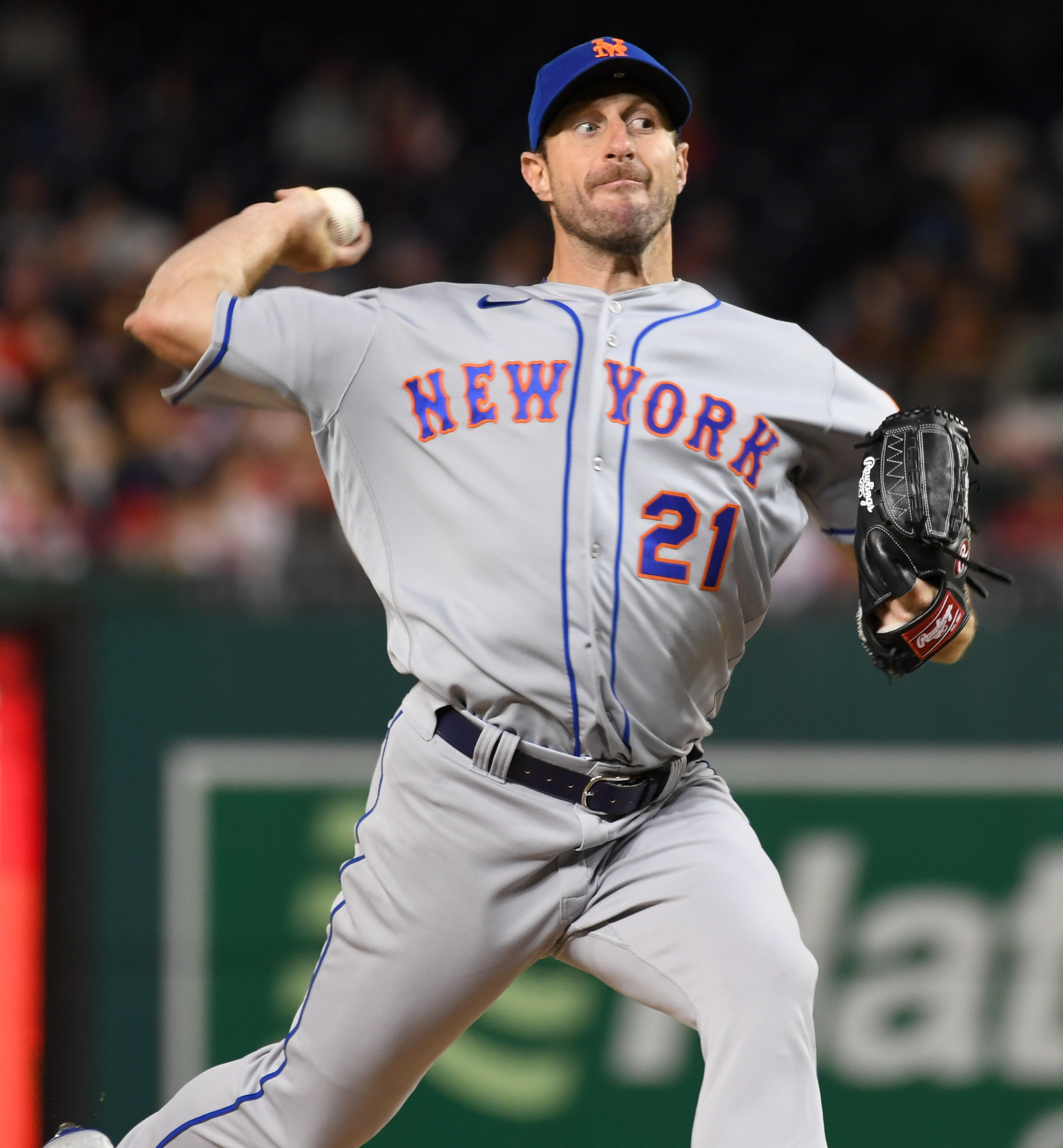
Scherzer with the Mets in 2022

On December 1, 2021, Scherzer agreed to a three-year, $130 million contract with the New York Mets. The contract had an average annual value (AAV) of $43.3 million, which was the largest AAV in MLB history, breaking the previous record held by Gerrit Cole of the New York Yankees who has an AAV of $36 million. This record was later broken by the Los Angeles Dodgers' signing of Shohei Ohtani in 2023. Because the Mets had already retired his two previous uniform numbers 37 (his Detroit number, retired for Casey Stengel) and 31 (his Washington number, retired for Mike Piazza), Scherzer took on number 21.

On April 8, 2022, Scherzer earned the win in his Mets debut against his former team, the Washington Nationals. The start was Scherzer's first-ever start as a visitor at Nationals Park and his first time facing the Nationals in nearly 12 years. On April 19, Scherzer made his home debut for the Mets, striking out 10 and allowing a hit and a run in seven innings, earning his third win of the 2022 season and his first win with the Mets at Citi Field. Scherzer recorded his 3,155th strikeout during a Subway Series game against the New York Yankees on August 22. He passed Pedro Martínez for 13th place on the all-time strikeout list. Scherzer earned the 200th win of his career on September 19, after pitching six perfect innings at American Family Field in his return from the injured list. In the same game, the Mets clinched their first playoff appearance since 2016. He joined Justin Verlander (a former teammate during his years in Detroit) and Zack Greinke as the only active pitchers with 200 wins. Scherzer made 23 starts for the Mets in 2022, posting an 11–5 record, a 2.29 ERA, and 173 strikeouts across 145^{1}/_{3} innings pitched. He made his only postseason start for the Mets in Game 1 of the NL Wild Card Series against the San Diego Padres in what turned out to be one of the worst starts of his career. He surrendered seven runs, including four home runs, in 4 2/3 innings pitched in the 7–1 loss. Scherzer did not pitch again as the Mets lost the series 2–1.

On December 6, 2022, he was named to the All-MLB Second Team. In 19 starts for the Mets in 2023, Scherzer posted a 9–4 record, a 4.01 ERA, and 121 strikeouts across 107^{2}/_{3} innings pitched.

=== Texas Rangers (2023–2024) ===
On July 29, 2023, the Mets traded Scherzer to the Texas Rangers along with $35.5 million in cash considerations for shortstop prospect Luisangel Acuña. As part of the deal, Scherzer opted into his 2024 player option worth more than $43 million. In his debut with the Rangers, Scherzer pitched six innings, allowing seven hits, three earned runs, and recorded two walks and nine strikeouts. On September 13, Scherzer was shut down for the remainder of the regular season after suffering a teres major strain. In 8 starts for the Rangers, he posted a 4–2 record and 3.20 ERA with 53 strikeouts in 45.0 innings of work.

Scherzer was reactivated during the postseason. He started three postseason games: Games 3 and 7 of the 2023 ALCS against the Houston Astros, and Game 3 of the 2023 World Series against the Arizona Diamondbacks. While he was eventually shut down again following back pain, the Rangers would go on to win their first World Series title in franchise history.

After the 2023 season, Scherzer had surgery on a herniated disc and then worked to recover from thumb soreness and nerve issues. He made his 2024 season debut on June 23, and threw five scoreless innings against the Kansas City Royals. He struck out four, which gave him a career total of 3,371, tying him with Greg Maddux for eleventh place on MLB's all-time list. Scherzer did not have a healthy 2024, dealing with arm fatigue and nerve issues, ending his season early with a hamstring strain. Overall, Scherzer started nine games with a 3.95 ERA.

=== Toronto Blue Jays (2025–2026) ===
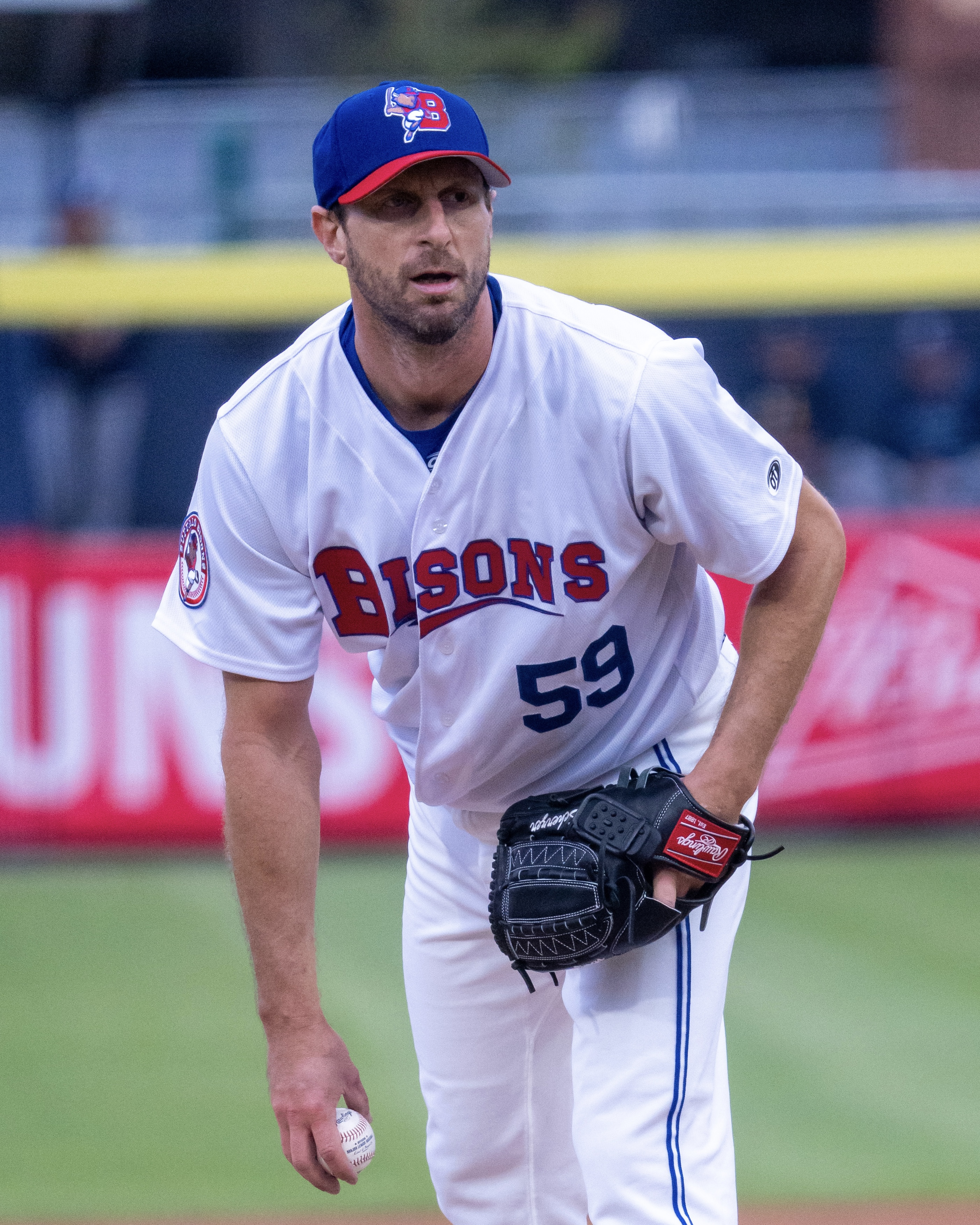
Max Scherzer pitching for the Triple-A Buffalo Bisons in 2025

On February 4, 2025, Scherzer signed a one-year, $15.5 million contract with the Toronto Blue Jays. He left his March 29 Blue Jays debut after three innings and was soon placed on the injured list with right thumb inflammation. On June 13, Scherzer made a rehab start for the Blue Jays' Triple-A affiliate, the Buffalo Bisons. he returned to the rotation on June 25.

He earned his first win as a Blue Jay on July 11 against the Athletics. For the 2025 season, Scherzer made 17 starts for the Blue Jays, posting a 5–5 record and 5.19 ERA with 82 strikeouts in 85.0 innings of work.

On October 16, he started Game 4 of the 2025 American League Championship Series against the Seattle Mariners, becoming the first pitcher in MLB history to start a postseason game for six different teams. He pitched 5 2/3 innings, allowing two runs and striking out five as the Blue Jays won 8–2. Scherzer was credited with the win, his first postseason win since the 2019 World Series, making him the fourth pitcher aged 41 or older to record a win in the playoffs. On October 27, he started Game 3 of the 2025 World Series, becoming the first pitcher to pitch for four teams in the World Series. He started Game 7 on November 1 to become the oldest pitcher to start in a winner-take-all World Series game.

On March 2, 2026, Scherzer signed a one-year, $3 million contract to stay with the Blue Jays. On June 10, Scherzer recorded his 3,500th career strikeout by fanning Kyle Schwarber of the Philadelphia Phillies in the first inning. He became the 11th player to reach this achievement. On August 8, Scherzer passed Walter Johnson to become tenth all-time in strikeouts with 3,516, and on August 30 he passed Gaylord Perry for ninth place by recording his 3,535th strikeout. In between on August 13, he pitched his 3,000th inning. He became the 139th player to reach this mark. For the 2026 season, Scherzer made 18 starts for the Blue Jays, posting a 4–9 record and 5.74 ERA with 68 strikeouts in 84 2/3 innings of work.

== Pitching and preparation style ==
He's definitely a different breed, always has been. Just seeing the way he goes about things. He's a machine.

— David Price, Scherzer's teammate in Detroit and Los Angeles

With a low three-quarters delivery (nearly sidearm), and with an overarm starting stretch when nobody is on base, Scherzer throws five pitches: a four-seam fastball with good movement averaging 92–96 miles per hour (148–154 km/h), topping out at 99 miles per hour (159 km/h), a slider at 85–86 miles per hour (137–138 km/h), a changeup at 84–85 miles per hour (135–137 km/h), a cutter at 88–89 miles per hour (142–143 km/h), and a curveball at 78–79 miles per hour (126–127 km/h). He primarily uses a fastball-slider combination against right-handed hitters and a fastball-changeup-cutter combination against left-handed hitters. Occasionally he also throws a curveball for the first strike in an at-bat.

Scherzer earned the nickname "Mad Max" partly because of his intense demeanor on the field and his unusual, highly detailed preparation methods. He also prepares intently on other aspects of the game, including hitting and baserunning. According to Nationals manager Dave Martinez, Scherzer differentiated himself from other major league pitchers because of his focus on hitting in addition to the work on his pitching.

== Awards and achievements ==
Awards received
Name of award		Times	Dates	Ref
All-MLB Team selectee		2	2019, 2021	
Baseball Digest Pitcher of the Year ^{†}		2	2013, 2021	
Cy Young Award *		3	2013, 2016, 2017	
Esurance MLB/This Year in Baseball Awards
Esurance MLB/This Year in Baseball Awards	Best Performance ^{†}	2	2015, 2016	
Esurance MLB/This Year in Baseball Awards	Best Pitcher ^{†}	1	2016	
MLB All-Star *		8	2013–2019, 2021	
NL Pitcher of the Month		6	2015 May–June, 2017 June, 2018 April–May, 2019 June	
Players Choice Award for Outstanding Pitcher *		3	2013, 2017, 2021	
The Sporting News Starting Pitcher of the Year *		4	2013, 2016, 2017, 2021	
Notes: Per Baseball-Reference.com. †—Awarded to one player in the major leagues. *—Awarded for play in National League from 2008 to 2009, and 2015–present; and for play in American League, from 2010 to 2014.

League statistical leader
Category	Times	Dates
Pitching
Bases on balls per nine innings pitched (BB/9)	1	2021
Batters faced	2	2015, 2018
Complete games	3	2015, 2017, 2018
Fielding Independent Pitching	1	2019
Games started	2	2015, 2016
Hits by pitch	1	2018
Hits per nine innings allowed	3	2017, 2018, 2021
Home runs allowed	1	2016
Innings pitched	2	2016, 2018
Shutouts	2	2016, 2018
Strikeout-to-walk ratio (K/BB)	4	2015, 2016, 2018, 2019
Strikeouts	3	2016–18
Strikeouts per 9 innings pitched (K/9)	3	2012, 2018, 2019
Walks plus hits per inning pitched (WHIP)	5	2013, 2016–18, 2021
Winning percentage	1	2013
Wins	4	2013, 2014, 2016, 2018
Wins above replacement—pitchers	2	2016, 2017
Fielding as pitcher
Fielding percentage	3	2011, 2015, 2021
Batting
Sacrifice hits	1	2016
Notes: Per Baseball-Reference.com. Through 2021 season. Awarded for play in National League from 2008 to 2009, and 2015–present; and for play in American League, from 2010 to 2014.

MLB records and other distinctions

- Most strikeouts in one nine-inning game (20–tied, on May 11, 2016)
- Most game scores of 100 or higher in one season (2, in 2015)
- Fewest innings to reach 100 strikeouts in one season (63, on May 19, 2018)
- Fewest innings to reach 15 strikeouts in one game (6 1/3, on May 12, 2018)
- Most consecutive batters retired in relief appearance as MLB debut (13, on April 29, 2008)
- Third pitcher to achieve three immaculate innings
- Fifth pitcher to achieve 100 double-digit strikeout games (May 8, 2021)
- 19th pitcher to reach 3,000 career strikeouts (September 12, 2021)
- First pitcher ever to appear in the World Series with four different teams (October 27, 2025)

Other achievements

- Two no-hitters pitched in one season:
  - versus the Pittsburgh Pirates on June 20, 2015
  - versus the New York Mets on October 3, 2015
- Three immaculate innings pitched:
  - versus the Philadelphia Phillies on May 14, 2017
  - versus the Tampa Bay Rays on June 5, 2018
  - versus the San Diego Padres on September 12, 2021

== Personal life ==
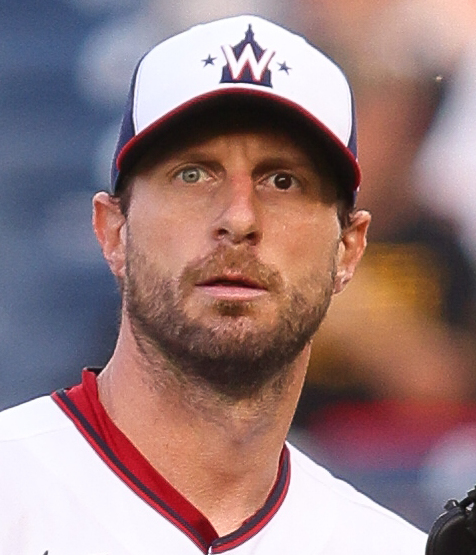
Scherzer's heterochromia iridum results in a light blue eye (right) and dark brown eye (left)

Scherzer has heterochromia iridum; his right eye is blue and his left eye is brown. On June 12, 2011, the Detroit Tigers distributed a bobblehead doll depicting Scherzer with the condition correctly portrayed. In the spring of 2017, the Nationals unveiled a "delightfully creepy" crop of Scherzer's eyes, correctly portrayed as blue and brown, with backward and forward Ks edited into the pupils.

Scherzer met his future wife, Erica May, at the University of Missouri, where they both were pitchers. May pitched for the Mizzou softball team. After more than eight years of dating, the couple married in November 2013. They have three daughters and a son. They welcomed their first daughter on November 29, 2017. On July 4, 2019, their second daughter was born. Their third child, a boy, was born on May 2, 2021; Scherzer pitched a complete game before leaving for the hospital that afternoon. Their fourth child, a girl, was born on January 30, 2023. The Scherzers owned four rescue dogs and two cats as of 2017. The family resided in McLean, a Northern Virginia suburb of Washington, D.C., but they listed the home for sale in 2020. That same year, they purchased a home in Jupiter, Florida.

The Scherzers are socially active. In 2013, they partnered with the Detroit Tigers Foundation on a program called Scherzer's Superstars, in which groups from the Metropolitan Detroit chapter of Big Brothers Big Sisters of America were invited to Comerica Park every Tuesday home game to meet Scherzer and some of his Detroit teammates and go down to the field for batting practice. In 2015, after her husband signed with the Washington Nationals and inspired by the actions of his future teammate Sean Doolittle and Doolittle's future wife, Eireann Dolan, Erica May-Scherzer partnered with organizers of the Nationals' annual "Night Out" event for LGBT fans and led an effort by Nationals' spouses to promote the event.

May-Scherzer is an ambassador for the Polaris Project, which aims to stop human trafficking; Scherzer started a fundraiser during the Nationals' 2016 season called Strike Out Modern Slavery in which the couple matched donations to Polaris for every strikeout Scherzer threw that season. Both Max and Erica are involved with the Humane Rescue Alliance, announcing after Hurricane Harvey in August 2017 that they would pay all pet adoption fees from the Washington, D.C.-based group's shelters for four days. When he was pitching for the Mets, the Scherzers agreed to cover the adoption fee at St. Hubert's Animal Welfare Center in Madison, New Jersey for any dog over 30 pounds adopted from June 6 to 12, 2022. More than 270 animals were adopted, largely due to the Scherzers' social media presence.

Scherzer's younger brother, Alex, died by suicide early in the summer of 2012. He had a passion for analyzing advanced baseball statistics, also called sabermetrics. Since Alex's death, Scherzer has dedicated every start to his late brother.

== See also ==
- List of largest sports contracts
- List of Detroit Tigers team records
- List of Washington Nationals team records
- List of Major League Baseball annual strikeout leaders
- List of Major League Baseball annual shutout leaders
- List of Major League Baseball career games started leaders
- List of Major League Baseball career strikeout leaders
- List of Major League Baseball career WHIP leaders
- List of Major League Baseball career wins leaders
- List of Major League Baseball no-hitters
- List of Major League Baseball pitchers who have thrown an immaculate inning
- List of Major League Baseball single-game records
- List of Major League Baseball single-game strikeout leaders
- List of Major League Baseball wins records
- List of University of Missouri alumni
- List of World Series starting pitchers

Awards and achievements
Preceded by Stephen Strasburg; Stephen Strasburg	Washington Nationals Opening Day; Starting pitcher 2015–2016; 2018–2021	Succeeded by Stephen Strasburg; Patrick Corbin
Preceded by Tylor Megill	New York Mets Opening Day; Starting pitcher 2023	Succeeded by Jose Quintana
Preceded by Chris Heston; Jake Arrieta	No-hitter pitcher June 20, 2015; October 3, 2015	Succeeded by Cole Hamels; Jake Arrieta
Preceded by Gerrit Cole; Alex Wood; Stephen Strasburg; Hyun-jin Ryu	National League Pitcher of the Month; May—June 2015; June 2017; April—May 2018; June 2019	Succeeded by Clayton Kershaw; Rich Hill; Jon Lester; Stephen Strasburg
