= Al Leiter =

American baseball player and commentator (born 1965)

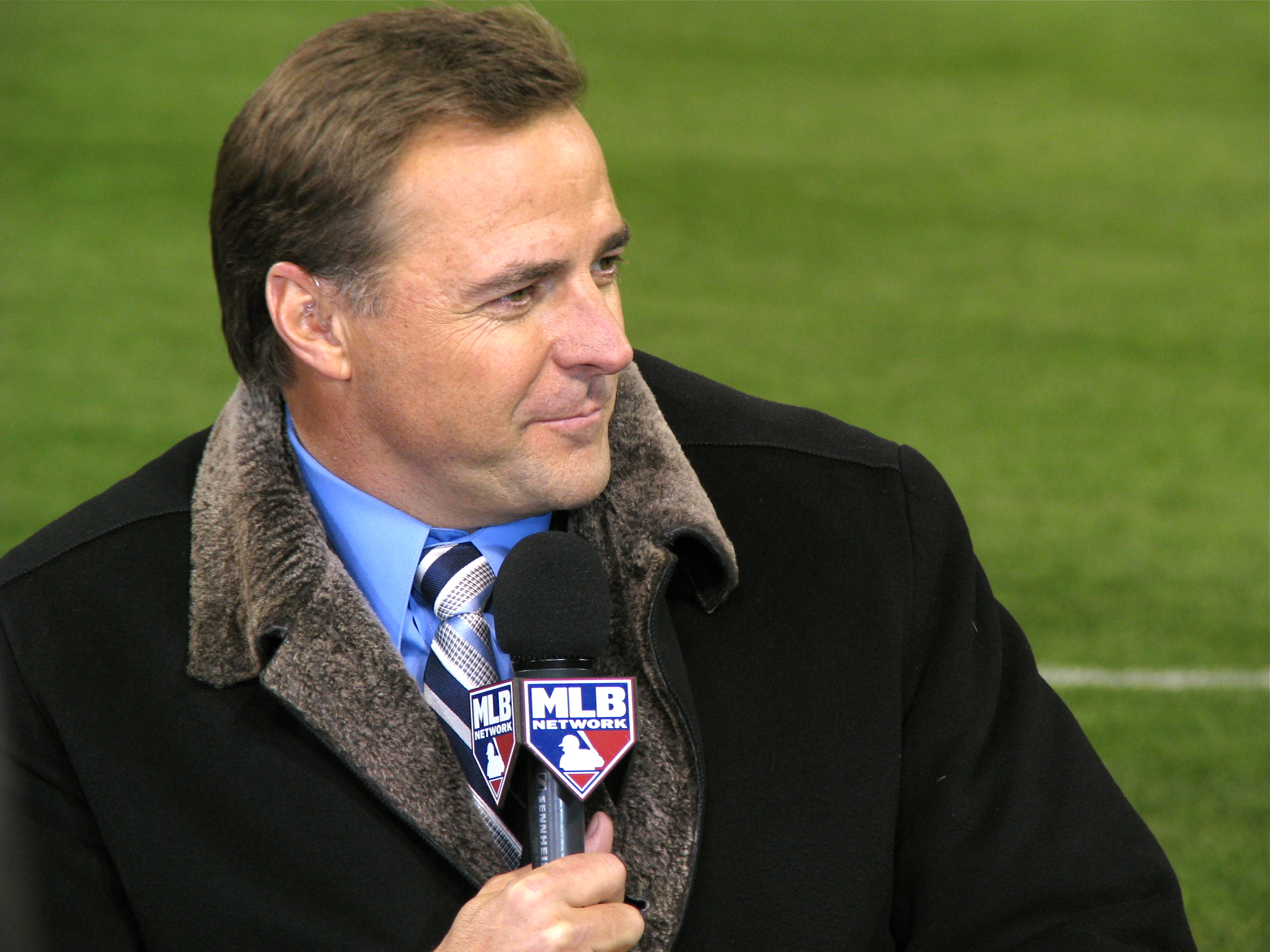
- Leiter at Citizens Bank Park in November 2009
- Pitcher
- Born: October 23, 1965 (age 60); Toms River, New Jersey, U.S.
- Batted: Left Threw: Left

MLB debut
- September 15, 1987, for the New York Yankees

Last MLB appearance
- October 2, 2005, for the New York Yankees

MLB statistics
- Win–loss record: 162–132
- Earned run average: 3.80
- Strikeouts: 1,974
- Stats at Baseball Reference

Teams
- New York Yankees (1987–1989); Toronto Blue Jays (1989–1995); Florida Marlins (1996–1997); New York Mets (1998–2004); Florida Marlins (2005); New York Yankees (2005)

Career highlights and awards
- 2× All-Star (1996, 2000); 3× World Series champion (1992, 1993, 1997); Roberto Clemente Award (2000); Pitched a no-hitter on May 11, 1996; New York Mets Hall of Fame

Alois Terry Leiter (/ˈlaɪtər/; born October 23, 1965) is an American former professional baseball player and current television sports commentator. He played in Major League Baseball (MLB) as a left-handed pitcher from 1987 to 2005 for the New York Yankees, Toronto Blue Jays, Florida Marlins, and New York Mets.

A two-time National League (NL) All-Star player, Leiter pitched for three World Series-winning teams and threw a no-hitter in 1996 during his tenure with the Marlins. As a member of the New York Mets, Leiter was named the recipient of the prestigious Roberto Clemente Award in 2000. In 2002, Leiter became the first pitcher in MLB history to win against all 30 teams. After his playing career, he worked as a television color commentator and baseball analyst for the YES Network and the MLB Network.

== Career ==
=== Early career ===
Leiter was raised in a baseball-oriented family; all five of his brothers played the game. A native of Berkeley Township, New Jersey, Leiter attended Central Regional High School, in the township's Bayville section. During one stretch in high school, he pitched consecutive no-hitters followed by a 32-strikeout game in 13 innings on April 19, 1984 (a game which ended in a tie when it was called for rain). Leiter was selected for the Wilson First Team All-American team. In 2016, the NJSIAA named Leiter to the NJ High School Hall of Fame.

=== New York Yankees ===
Leiter was drafted by New York Yankees in 1984 MLB draft as a second-round pick. Both his brother Mark and he became Yankees prospects.

Leiter made his MLB debut as the starting pitcher for the Yankees on September 15, 1987, earning the win in the Yankees' 4–3 victory over the Milwaukee Brewers at Yankee Stadium. Leiter has mentioned on a YES Network broadcast that early in his career with the Yankees, manager Billy Martin walked up to him and asked him why he was lifting weights. Leiter responded, "To strengthen my arm." Billy was quoted as saying, "If you want to strengthen your arm, do some long toss." The young Leiter grew nervous easily; teammate Tommy John observed, "If they had named him to start on opening day [in 1989], he wouldn't have slept for a week. That's how high-strung he was. He was a rookie bouncing off the walls." In one of his final starts as a young player for the Yankees, manager Dallas Green left Leiter in to throw 162 pitches on a cold, damp day in 1989.

=== Toronto Blue Jays ===
The Yankees traded Leiter to the Toronto Blue Jays for outfielder Jesse Barfield on April 30, 1989. After the trade, the left-hander had arthroscopic surgery. He pitched in fewer than 16 innings for the Blue Jays from 1989 to 1992, because of the surgery, a pinched nerve in his elbow, tendinitis, and another arthroscopic surgery on his left shoulder. His statistics during this period were a 5.17 ERA in 15 2/3 innings, starting once, and earning no decisions. He was, however, able to overcome a blisters problem by developing a regimen that included applying a liniment and bandages and filing his calluses.

Leiter finally got over his injury troubles in 1993, making 32 appearances (12 starts) for the Blue Jays. That year, he appeared in five postseason games and even picked up a win in relief in game 1, and hit a double in game 3 of the World Series, as the Blue Jays won their second consecutive championship. Leiter pitched effectively for the Blue Jays for the next two seasons before departing via free agency in 1996.

=== Florida Marlins ===
Following the 1995 season, Leiter left Toronto and signed with the Florida Marlins as a free agent. In his first season as a Marlin, Leiter made his first MLB All-Star team, going 16–12 with a 2.93 ERA and 200 strikeouts.

On May 11, 1996, he pitched a no-hitter against the Colorado Rockies, the first no-hitter in Marlins franchise history. This was also the first no-hitter that included a three-pitch inning. Leiter was also selected to his first All Star game. The game was played at Veterans Stadium in Philadelphia, where he recorded the last out of a National League (NL) 6–0 win over the American League. The win was the last NL win for 13 years until 2010, when the NL team won the All-Star Classic in Anaheim.

In 1997, Leiter won another World Series as the Marlins beat the Cleveland Indians. Leiter started game 7 for the Marlins, pitching six innings and giving up two earned runs, while not being credited with a decision. The Marlins went on to win the game 3–2 in 11 innings to capture the championship.

=== New York Mets ===
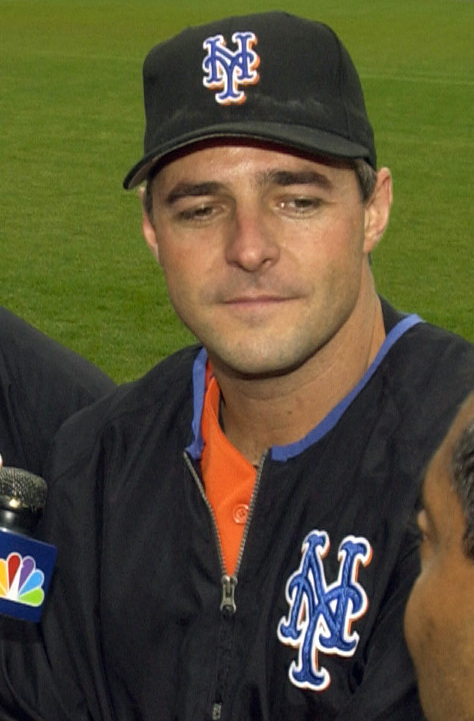
Leiter with the Mets in 2004

In the following off season, Leiter was traded to the New York Mets in part of the Marlins' fire sale, when owner Wayne Huizenga traded away almost all of the team's higher-priced players.

In Leiter's first season as a Met, he reached a career high in wins, going 17–6 and a career low in earned runs allowed, finishing with a 2.47 ERA. In 1999, when the Mets were tied with the Cincinnati Reds for the NL wild card spot after 162 games, Leiter was the Mets starting pitcher in the "winner-take-all", one-game playoff at Cinergy Field in Cincinnati. Leiter pitched a two-hit shutout to earn the win in the Mets' 5–0 victory. The win put the Mets in the playoffs for the first time in 11 seasons. The Mets went on to lose the 1999 National League Championship Series to the Atlanta Braves in four games to two.

In 2000, Leiter made the All-Star team once again, going 16–8 with a 3.20 ERA and 200 strikeouts. The Mets made the playoffs again in 2000 and this time reached the World Series. Leiter started game 1 of the 2000 World Series at Yankee Stadium and game 5 at Shea Stadium. Although he managed to achieve a 2.87 ERA and 16 strikeouts in 15 2/3 innings, the Mets lost both games he started and eventually lost the World Series four games to one. He was booed by Yankee fans when presented that year's Roberto Clemente Award prior to game 2 of the World Series. Leiter was the second New York Met to be honored with the award. During the 2000 season, he pitched in the All-Star game and gave up a single to Derek Jeter.

On April 30, 2002, Leiter became the first MLB pitcher to defeat all 30 teams, after beating the Arizona Diamondbacks 10–1. Leiter pitched for the Mets until the end of the 2004 season. In his seven seasons in a Met uniform, all wearing number 22, he went 95–67 with a 3.42 ERA. At the time he left the Mets, he ranked highly on several Mets all-time lists, including wins (sixth), strikeouts (seventh with 1106), innings pitched (seventh with 1360), and games started (sixth with 213). He was the Mets Opening Day starting pitcher in 1999, 2001, and 2002.

In 10 straight seasons from 1995 to 2004, Leiter had at least 10 wins and at least a .500 record.

=== Second stint with Marlins ===
Following the 2004 season, the Mets declined Leiter's US$10 million option for 2005, making him a free agent. His former team, the Marlins, signed Leiter to a one-year, $8 million contract on December 8, 2004.

Leiter struggled during his return to the Marlins. He walked more batters than usual (60 in 80 innings, in addition to 88 hits). In 17 appearances (16 starts), he had a 3–7 record and a 6.64 ERA, and he took much criticism for the Marlins' first-half struggles in 2005 (they were seven games behind the surprising Washington Nationals at the All-Star break). He was demoted to the bullpen in late June, but he returned to the rotation after an injury to Josh Beckett. On July 10, when the Marlins played their last game before the three-day All-Star break, he gave up six runs in three-plus innings.

On July 14, 2005, the Florida Marlins designated Leiter for assignment.

=== Second stint with Yankees ===
On July 15, 2005, Leiter was acquired by the New York Yankees, which had four starting pitchers on the disabled list, for a player to be named later. His first start as a Yankee since April 26, 1989, came on July 17, 2005, against the division-leading Boston Red Sox. Leiter won the game, pitching 6 1/3 innings, allowing one run and three hits, and striking out eight. After several starts with mixed success, he informed Joe Torre that he would be willing to pitch out of the bullpen, where he would stay for the latter part of the season, yielding his starting slot to Aaron Small.

Leiter worked out of the bullpen in the 2005 American League Division Series, pitching in four of the five games between the Yankees and Los Angeles Angels of Anaheim. The Angels won the series three games to two. In his final official appearance in an MLB uniform, Leiter earned a win, pitching 2/3 of a scoreless inning in game 4 at Yankee Stadium. The Yankees won the game 3–2.

Leiter signed a minor league contract with the Yankees in 2006, but he stated he would likely retire. The primary reason he spent part of spring training with the Yankees was to keep in shape for the World Baseball Classic. After the United States team was eliminated from the World Baseball Classic, he officially retired in an interview on YES, after a Yankees spring training victory versus the Indians, in which Leiter pitched 1/3 of an inning.

=== World Baseball Classic ===
Leiter joined the United States roster for the 2006 World Baseball Classic, pitching 2/3 of an inning.

== Broadcasting career ==
Al Leiter has worked in the television broadcast booth for Fox Sports during the playoffs for several seasons, mainly to provide in-depth analysis of various pitchers. He worked the postseason for ESPN as studio analyst in 1998 and 1999. While still playing for the Mets, his first opportunity as a color commentator for Fox Sports was in 2003 NLCS. The Marlins went on to win the World Series that year, beating the Yankees. Leiter worked as an analyst alongside Thom Brennaman and Steve Lyons. The following year, Leiter was in the booth with Joe Buck and Tim McCarver for the Boston Red Sox vs. NY Yankees in the ALCS. Since 2006, Leiter has worked as a color commentator and a studio analyst for the YES Network. He won a NY Emmy in 2007 for the "Manny game" in Boston. In 2009, Leiter was hired by MLB Network and appeared on the first show the network produced on January 1, 2009. He became a studio analyst for MLB Network in addition to his commentating job for the YES Network. In 2009, 2011, 2013, 2015, 2018, and 2019, he received a National Sports Emmy Award Nomination for Studio Analyst. In 2012, 2014, 2016, and 2019, he received the Sports Emmy for Outstanding Studio Show-Daily MLB Tonight Segment Producer. He also worked select games for the Miami Marlins on Fox Sports Florida in 2016. In 2016, he won the NY Sports Emmy for game analyst for the YES Network.

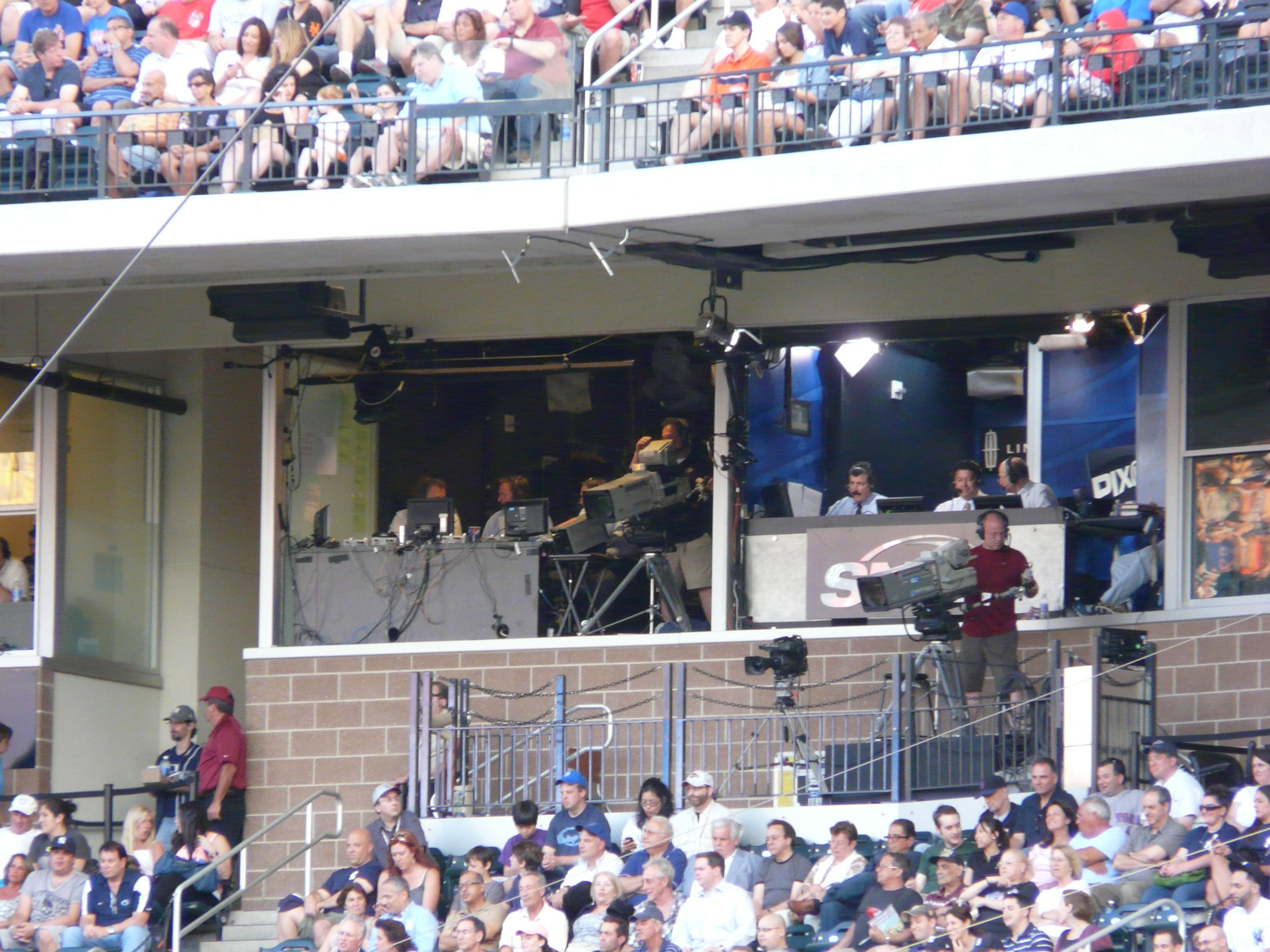
Leiter broadcasting a game.

On March 3, 2019, he was named a baseball operations advisor for the Mets. Leiter was to focus on scouting and player development with an emphasis on mental preparation for pitchers, working with players at every level of the organization, from newly drafted players to Major Leaguers.

== Charitable work ==
Leiter has won nearly every philanthropic award MLB offers, including the Roberto Clemente Award in 2000 and the Branch Rickey Award in 1999.

== Political activities ==
Leiter has expressed interest in running for political office as a Republican in his home state of New Jersey. He served as a member of New Jersey Governor Chris Christie's transition team. Leiter was appointed as a member to the New Jersey Sports, Gaming, and Entertainment Committee. Governor Christie nominated him for the New Jersey Hall of Fame Commission, and he was appointed to the commission by the state senate.

Leiter has donated thousands of dollars to GOP candidates, including Donald Trump, David Perdue, Kelly Loeffler, Lindsey Graham, Chris Christie, and Rudy Giuliani.

== Personal life ==
Leiter is of Austrian, Czech, and British descent. His wife Lori and he have four children - daughters, Lindsay, Carly and Katelyn, and son Jack (who made his MLB debut with the Texas Rangers in 2024). His brother, Kurt, played in the Baltimore Orioles organization and reached as high as Double-A. Another brother, Mark Leiter, pitched 11 seasons in MLB. His nephew, Mark Leiter Jr., is also a professional baseball pitcher, making Mark Sr. and Al the first brothers to play in MLB who also had sons play in the league.

== See also ==
- List of Major League Baseball career hit batsmen leaders
- List of Major League Baseball career strikeout leaders
- List of Major League Baseball no-hitters

Preceded by Ramón Martínez	No-hitter pitcher May 11, 1996	Succeeded by Dwight Gooden
Preceded by Hideo Nomo	NL hits per nine innings 1996	Succeeded by Pedro Martínez
