= Eireann Dolan =

American writer, philanthropist, and academic

- Occupations: Sportscaster; Writer; Philanthropist
- Spouse: Sean Doolittle (m. 2017)

Eireann Dolan is an American writer, philanthropist, religious studies academic, and former broadcaster for CSN California. She is well known for her work around charities and social issues in collaboration with her husband, Washington Nationals pitcher Sean Doolittle. In 2015, she hosted the Comcast SportsNet show Call to the Pen about the Oakland Athletics.

== Philanthropy ==
Dolan has stated she and Doolittle make an effort to not just write a check, but also promote others to engage on causes they care about.

=== LGBT advocacy ===
In 2015, the Oakland Athletics announced they would host their first-ever Pride Night, to honor lesbian, gay, bisexual, and transgender fans. Dolan, who has two moms, wanted to be supportive of the team's efforts to welcome LGBT fans to the Oakland Coliseum. Some season ticket holders had negative reactions to the announced Pride Night, and said they planned to not attend the game; Dolan put out a call on her blog and Twitter feed that she would purchase any tickets at face value and donate them to local LGBT charities. She also started a GoFundMe to raise money for Bay Area LGBT groups Our Space, AIDS Project East Bay, and Frameline; the campaign raised nearly $40,000 in donations. She and Doolittle also matched $3,000. Through the Pride Night campaign, Dolan and Doolittle were able to donate 900 tickets to the game to LGBT charities. She received the Ally for Equality Award from the Bay Area Human Rights Campaign in 2015 for her work with Pride Night.

=== Syrian refugee Thanksgiving dinner 2015 ===
In November 2015, Dolan was disturbed by anti-refugee statements made by governors in her residence of Arizona, her home state of Illinois, and Doolittle's home state of New Jersey. Dolan's grandfather had fled civil war in Ireland to emigrate to the United States. She wanted to do something to honor the Syrian refugees now entering the United States, and since she was planning to be with family in Illinois for Thanksgiving, decided to host Syrian refugee families for a traditional Thanksgiving dinner, in collaboration with the Syrian Resettlement Network in Chicago. Chicago Mayor Rahm Emanuel heard of the plan and wanted to attend; while his schedule precluded Dolan's attendance, she sent her father as her representative, and A's fans provided desserts. Seventeen Syrian refugee families attended the event.

=== Mental health resources for veterans ===
For Memorial Day 2017, Dolan and Doolittle co-authored an article in Sports Illustrated advocating for mental health services for U.S. military veterans with "bad papers," a classification for service members who receive a "less than honorable" discharge. Before writing it, they sought out briefings from 10 organizations working on the issue, including the Brookings Institution, Human Rights Campaign, and Cato Institute. The couple has previously supported veterans issues: they created a registry to furnish two Northern California houses through Operation Finally Home, an organization that provides housing to wounded veterans and their families.

=== DC statehood ===
Dolan and Doolittle are committed to the District of Columbia statehood movement. In August 2022, they co-hosted an art exhibit in Washington, D.C. entitled "Art Drives Statehood" to raise awareness of the cause.

== Personal life ==
Dolan was raised in Chicago. Her father was a bank vice president and her mother was a stay at home mom. Her uncle was in the Navy. She studied theology and religious studies at L'Institut Catholique de Paris for three years and graduated from the University of San Diego.

Dolan met Sean Doolittle in 2012. Dolan had been working as a comedy writer with former Oakland A's pitcher Brandon McCarthy, who thought she and his fellow A's pitcher Doolittle would click. McCarthy suggested they connect, and they did so via Twitter. The couple eloped on October 2, 2017, the day after the end of the 2017 Major League Baseball season. This is her second marriage. She was previously married to Alex Kern.

She is a graduate student in pastoral studies at Fordham University's Graduate School of Religion and Religious Education.
