= Randy Johnson's perfect game =

2004 baseball game in Georgia, U.S.

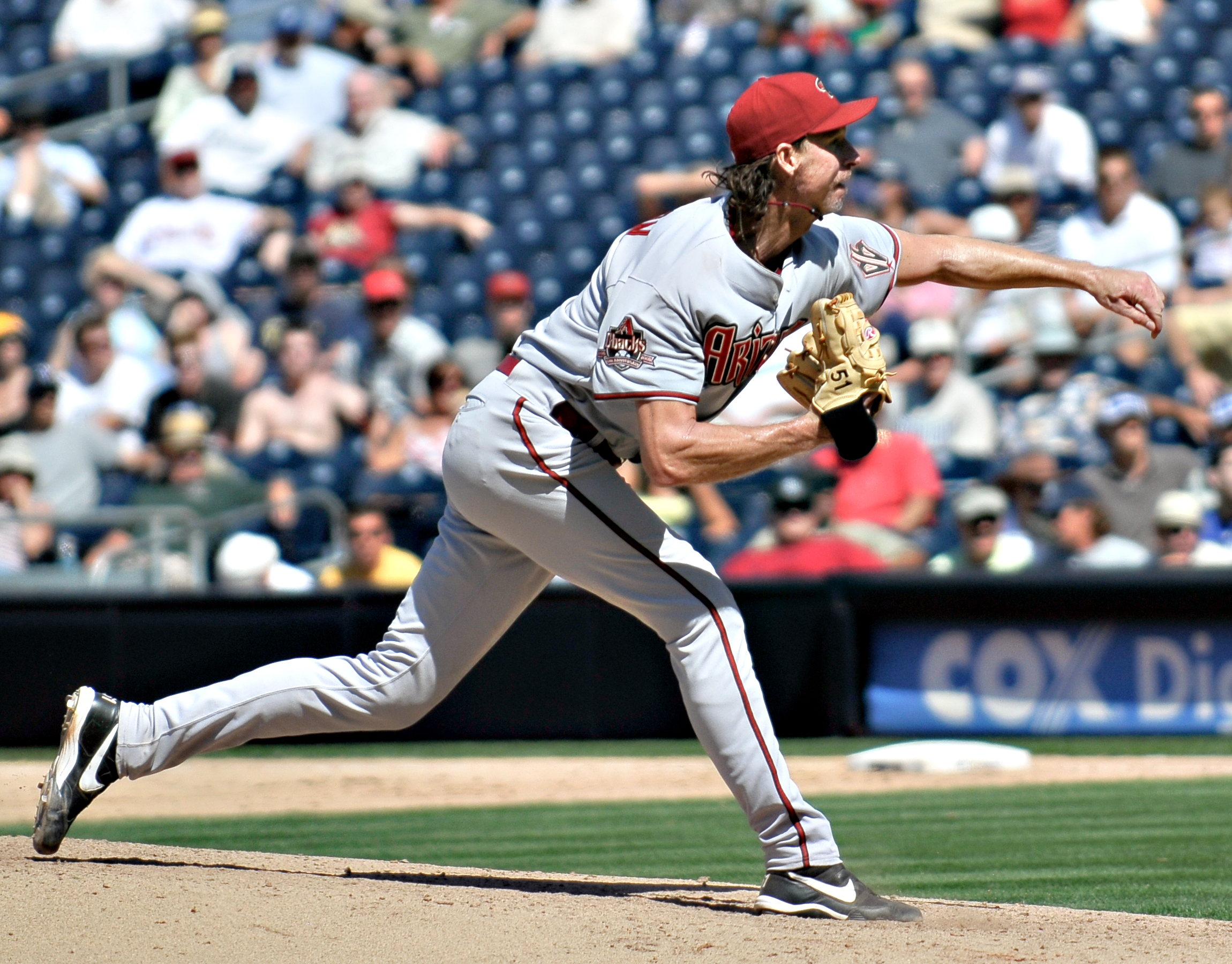
- Randy Johnson, pictured in 2008, threw his second career no-hitter, a perfect game, on May 18, 2004.
Arizona Diamondbacks	Atlanta Braves
2	0
	1	2	3	4	5	6	7	8	9	R	H	E
Arizona Diamondbacks	0	1	0	0	0	0	1	0	0	2	8	0
Atlanta Braves	0	0	0	0	0	0	0	0	0	0	0	3
- Date: May 18, 2004
- Venue: Turner Field
- City: Atlanta, Georgia
- Managers: Bob Brenly (Arizona Diamondbacks); Bobby Cox (Atlanta Braves)
- Television: FSN Arizona (Diamondbacks); TBS Superstation (Braves)
- TV announcers: FSN Arizona: Thom Brennaman (play-by-play); Mark Grace (color commentator) TBS Superstation: Skip Caray (play-by-play); Joe Simpson (color commentator)

On May 18, 2004, Randy Johnson, pitching for the Major League Baseball (MLB) Arizona Diamondbacks, threw a perfect game, beating the Atlanta Braves 2–0 at Turner Field in Atlanta before a crowd of 23,381. Johnson, at 40 years, was the oldest pitcher in MLB history to throw a perfect game, surpassing Cy Young who was 37 when he threw his perfect game in 1904. This was baseball's 17th perfect game, with David Cone's perfect game having been the 16th in 1999. Johnson's perfect game was the seventh in National League history (the predecessor being Dennis Martínez in 1991) and the first-ever Diamondbacks no-hitter.

== Background ==
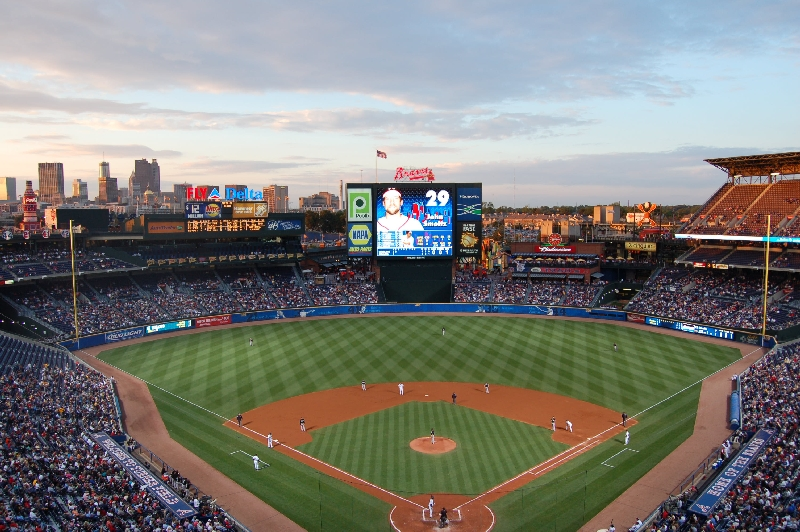
Turner Field was the site of Randy Johnson's perfect game.

Going into the game, Johnson had a win–loss record of 3–4 with a 2.83 earned run average (ERA) in eight games during the 2004 season.

== Game summary ==
The game started at 7:36 p.m. EDT in front of 23,381 fans at Turner Field in Atlanta. The game was televised nationally by TBS as part of the Braves' TV contract and on FSN Arizona in the Diamondbacks' local market. Johnson's catcher for the game was Robby Hammock, who was playing his second season in the Majors. Johnson later praised Hammock stating, "I only shook [Hammock] off two or three times...He called a great game. The thing is he was probably the most excited guy in the clubhouse, and I'm happy for that. He's come a long way." The last batter of the game was pinch-hitter Eddie Pérez, who struck out on a 98 miles per hour (158 km/h) fastball. Johnson struck out 13 batters, the third-most strikeouts in an MLB perfect game behind Sandy Koufax's 14 strikeouts in 1965 and Matt Cain's 14 strikeouts in 2012. The perfect game was Johnson's second no-hitter. His first was in 1990 for the Seattle Mariners. Johnson's perfect game was the first in MLB since David Cone on July 18, 1999, for the New York Yankees, and the first in the National League since Dennis Martínez of the Montreal Expos on July 28, 1991. Johnson, who was 40 at the time, surpassed Cy Young as the oldest pitcher to throw a perfect game in MLB history. Young, who achieved the feat in 1904, was 37 at the time.

The play that came closest to being a hit was Mike Hampton's second at-bat in the sixth inning when a chop ground ball dribbling left of the second base bag resulted in Alex Cintrón performing a do-or-die running grab and throw to first baseman Shea Hillenbrand for the out.

== Game statistics ==
General reference
May 18, 2004 Arizona Diamondbacks at Atlanta Braves Play by Play and Box Score Baseball-Reference.com Sports Reference, LLC. Retrieved August 4, 2010.

=== Line score ===
Team	1	2	3	4	5	6	7	8	9	R	H	E
Arizona Diamondbacks (15–23)	0	1	0	0	0	0	1	0	0	2	8	0
Atlanta Braves (17–20)	0	0	0	0	0	0	0	0	0	0	0	3
WP: Randy Johnson (4–4) LP: Mike Hampton (0–5)

=== Box score ===
Arizona	AB	R	H	RBI	BB	SO	AVG
Chad Tracy, 3B	4	0	2	1	1	0	.348
Matt Kata, 2B	5	0	0	0	0	1	.254
Luis Gonzalez, LF	3	0	0	0	1	0	.271
Shea Hillenbrand, 1B	4	0	1	0	0	1	.261
Steve Finley, CF	4	0	1	0	0	0	.265
Danny Bautista, RF	4	1	1	0	0	0	.341
Alex Cintrón, SS	4	1	3	1	0	0	.255
Robby Hammock, C	3	0	0	0	1	1	.229
Randy Johnson, P	4	0	0	0	0	2	.150
Totals	35	2	8	2	3	5	.228

BATTING

- 2B: Cintron 2 (9, Hampton, Hampton).
- TB: Tracy 2; Hillenbrand; Finley; Bautista; Cintron 5.
- RBI: Cintron (11), Tracy (15).
- 2-out RBI: Cintron, Tracy.
- Runners left in scoring position, 2 out: Hammock, Hillenbrand, Bautista, Kata 2.
- GIDP: Gonzalez, L.
- Team LOB: 9.

Arizona	IP	H	R	ER	BB	SO	HR	ERA
Randy Johnson (W, 4–4)	9	0	0	0	0	13	0	2.43
Totals	9	0	0	0	0	13	0	0.00

Atlanta	AB	R	H	RBI	BB	SO	AVG
Jesse Garcia, SS	3	0	0	0	0	2	.284
Julio Franco, 1B	3	0	0	0	0	1	.255
Chipper Jones, LF	3	0	0	0	0	3	.238
Andruw Jones, CF	3	0	0	0	0	0	.246
Johnny Estrada, C	3	0	0	0	0	2	.333
J. D. Drew, RF	3	0	0	0	0	1	.296
Mark DeRosa, 3B	3	0	0	0	0	0	.201
Nick Green, 2B	3	0	0	0	0	2	.222
Mike Hampton, P	2	0	0	0	0	1	.200
Eddie Pérez, PH^{[a]}	1	0	0	0	0	1	.200
Totals	27	0	0	0	0	13	.000

FIELDING

- E: DeRosa (8, fielding), Estrada (1, drop ball), Hampton (1, throw).
- Outfield assists: Jones, A (Hammock at 3rd base).
- DP: (Hampton-Garcia-Franco).

Atlanta	IP	H	R	ER	BB	SO	HR	ERA
Mike Hampton (L, 0–5)	9	8	2	2	3	5	0	6.36
Totals	9	8	2	2	3	5	0	2.00

=== Other info ===
- Pitches-strikes: Johnson 117–87, Hampton 107–71.
- Ground outs-fly outs: Johnson 7–7, Hampton 13–8.
- Batters faced: Johnson 27, Hampton 38.
- Umpires: HP: Greg Gibson. 1B: Bruce Dreckman. 2B: Gerry Davis. 3B: Larry Poncino.
- Weather: 72 °F (22.2 °C), cloudy.
- Wind: 5 mph, Out to CF.
- Time: 2:13.
- Attendance: 23,381.
- Venue: Turner Field.

== Reactions ==
Robby Hammock, the catcher of Johnson's perfect game:

Every time you catch [Johnson], you feel that something like this has a chance to happen...He's so intense, and it's something he has out there on the mound that makes me that much better.

— Robbie Hammock, May 19, 2004: MLB.com

Robin Yount, the bench coach of the Diamondbacks:

I was part of two no-hitters, one against [the Milwaukee Brewers] by Kansas City and Steve Busby and one for us against Baltimore with Juan Nieves. But to see Randy do it was even more remarkable because he's had such an incredible career.

— Robin Yount, May 19, 2004: MLB.com

Luis Gonzalez, left fielder for the Diamondbacks:

Steve Finley and I were part of a no-hitter that Darryl Kile threw when we were all in Houston. But there's no doubt that for Randy to be out there pitching like that — well, nothing can compare to Randy.

— Luis Gonzalez, May 19, 2004: MLB.com

Bob Brenly, Diamondbacks manager:

This is one of those nights where a superior athlete was on top of his game. There was a tremendous rhythm out there. His focus, his concentration, his stuff, everything was as good as it could possibly be.

— Bob Brenly, May 18, 2004: ESPN.com

== Footnotes ==
- ^{a} Eddie Pérez pinch hit for pitcher Mike Hampton in the bottom of the ninth inning.
