= Randy Johnson =

American baseball player (born 1963)

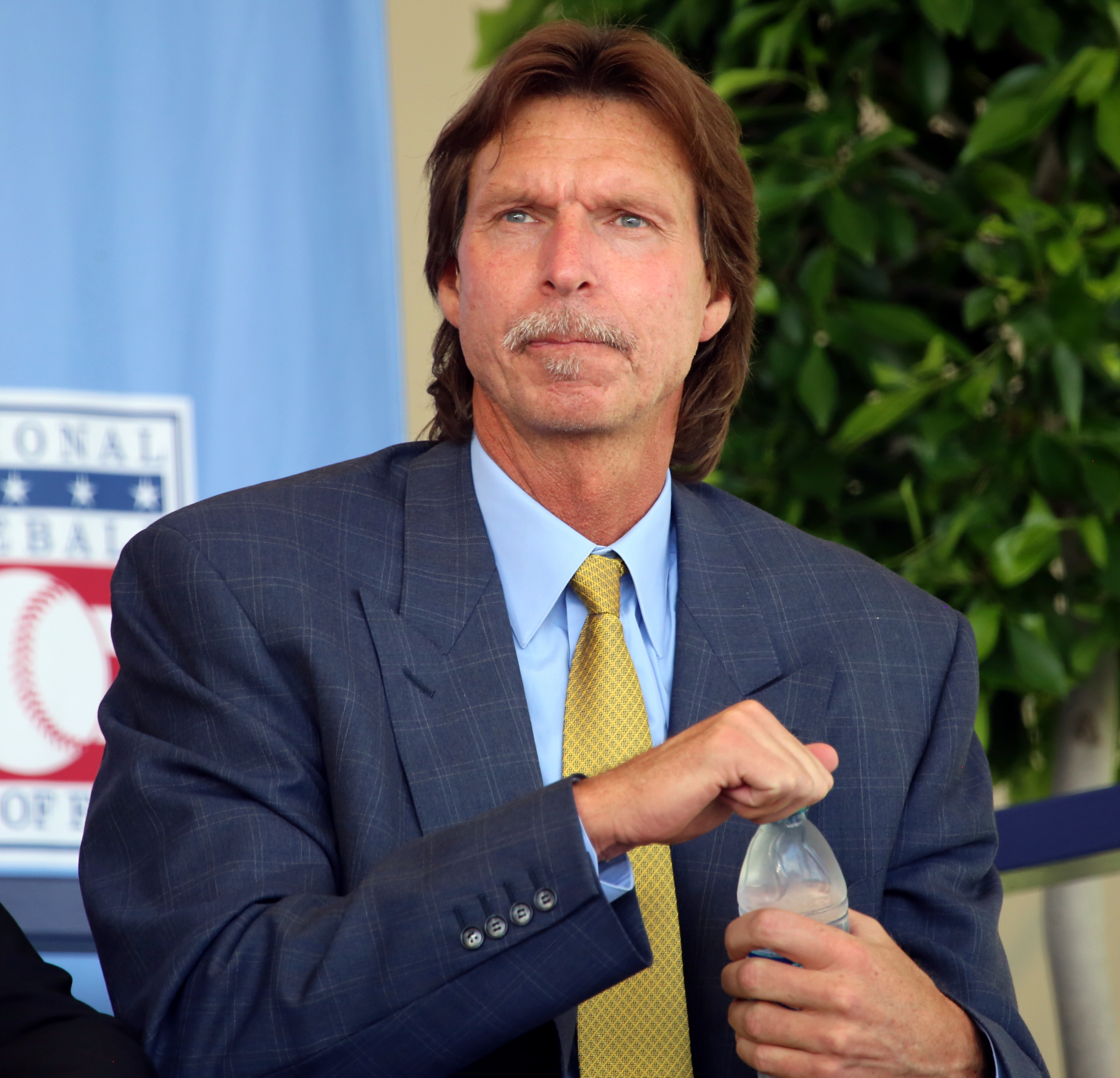
- Johnson in 2016
- Pitcher
- Born: September 10, 1963 (age 63); Walnut Creek, California, U.S.
- Batted: Right Threw: Left

MLB debut
- September 15, 1988, for the Montreal Expos

Last MLB appearance
- October 4, 2009, for the San Francisco Giants

MLB statistics
- Win–loss record: 303–166
- Earned run average: 3.29
- Strikeouts: 4,875
- Stats at Baseball Reference

Teams
- Montreal Expos (1988–1989); Seattle Mariners (1989–1998); Houston Astros (1998); Arizona Diamondbacks (1999–2004); New York Yankees (2005–2006); Arizona Diamondbacks (2007–2008); San Francisco Giants (2009)

Career highlights and awards
- 10× All-Star (1990, 1993–1995, 1997, 1999–2002, 2004); World Series champion (2001); 5× Cy Young Award (1995, 1999–2002); World Series MVP (2001); Triple Crown (2002); MLB wins leader (2002); 4× ERA leader (1995, 1999, 2001, 2002); 9× Strikeout leader (1992–1995, 1999–2002, 2004); Pitched a perfect game on May 18, 2004; Pitched a no-hitter on June 2, 1990; Seattle Mariners No. 51 retired; Arizona Diamondbacks No. 51 retired; Seattle Mariners Hall of Fame; Arizona Diamondbacks Hall of Fame

Member of the National

Baseball Hall of Fame
- Induction: 2015
- Vote: 97.3% (first ballot)

Randall David Johnson (born September 10, 1963), nicknamed "the Big Unit," is an American former professional baseball pitcher who played 22 seasons in Major League Baseball (MLB) (1988–2009) for six teams, primarily the Seattle Mariners and Arizona Diamondbacks.

At 6 feet 10 inches (2.08 metres) tall, Johnson was the tallest player in MLB history when he entered the league, contributing to his intimidating persona and pitching style. As a player, he was especially known for his overpowering fastball and devastating slider, a combination that remained effective throughout his lengthy career. While he initially struggled with control in his early seasons, Johnson subsequently established himself as one of the most dominant pitchers of his era, leading his league in strikeouts nine times, and in earned run average, winning percentage, and complete games four times each. Along with teammate Curt Schilling, Johnson was one of two World Series Most Valuable Players in 2001; in the Series, Johnson won three games and led the Diamondbacks to a World Series victory over the New York Yankees in the fourth season of the team's existence. He won the pitching Triple Crown in 2002.

Johnson's 303 career victories are the fifth-most by a left-hander in MLB history, while his 4,875 strikeouts place him second all time behind Nolan Ryan and first among left-handers. He recorded 300 strikeouts in a season six different times, a major league record tied with Ryan. Johnson is a 10-time All-Star, won the Cy Young Award five times, and is one of only two pitchers (along with Greg Maddux) to win the award in four consecutive seasons (1999–2002). Johnson won Cy Young Awards in both leagues. He is also one of five pitchers to pitch no-hitters in both leagues, and one of 26 pitchers in history to record a win against all 30 MLB franchises.

Johnson enjoyed a career longevity uncommon to pitchers, with his signature fastball-slider combination remaining effective well into his 40s. Four of his six 300-strikeout seasons occurred after his 35th birthday. On May 18, 2004, at 40 years old, he threw MLB's 17th perfect game, becoming the oldest pitcher to accomplish the feat. Johnson retired at the age of 46, and was elected to the Baseball Hall of Fame in 2015 in his first year of eligibility. He is the first member of the Hall to be depicted in a Diamondbacks uniform on his plaque. Johnson's accomplishments and accolades have earned him a reputation as one of the greatest pitchers in baseball history. On August 8, 2015, the Diamondbacks retired Johnson's number 51. On May 2, 2026, the Mariners retired Johnson's number 51, making him one of 12 players in MLB history to have his number retired by multiple MLB teams.

== Early life and amateur career ==
Johnson was born on September 10, 1963, in the San Francisco Bay Area suburb of Walnut Creek, California, to Carol Hannah and Rollen Charles "Bud" Johnson. At Livermore High School, he was a star in baseball and basketball, though he was cut from the school basketball team his junior year for failing to run a six-minute mile. As a senior in 1982, he struck out 121 batters in 66 2/3 innings and threw a perfect game in his last high school start. He threw approximately 90 mph (140 km/h) and was imposingly tall, though he felt he was not the best pitcher in his league. After high school, the Atlanta Braves selected Johnson in the fourth round of the 1982 MLB draft, but he did not sign, choosing instead to attend college.

Johnson played college baseball for the University of Southern California (USC) Trojans. He also played two years for USC's basketball team. He was scouted by USC coach Rod Dedeuax's son out of high school. He was a starter at USC, where he was a teammate of Mark McGwire, but often exhibited control problems. He had a 16–12 record with 5 saves and a 4.66 ERA in three college seasons, striking out 206 batters but walking 188 in 243 1/3 innings. His 104 walks issued in 1985 are a program record.

== Professional career ==
=== Montreal Expos ===
==== Draft and minor leagues (1985–1988) ====
The Montreal Expos drafted Johnson in the second round of the 1985 Major League Baseball draft. That summer, he pitched for the Jamestown Expos of the New York–Penn League. In 1986, he pitched for the West Palm Beach Expos of the Florida State League, ranking second in the league in strikeouts. In 1987, he pitched for the Jacksonville Expos of the Southern League. He was the league's pitcher of the month in May and led the league in strikeouts. In 1988, he pitched for the Indianapolis Indians of the American Association. On August 6, he pitched the first seven innings of a combined no-hitter, a 1–0 loss, as he allowed a walk in the first inning to score the only run of the game. In mid-June, he was removed from a game as an injury precaution after attempting to field a ball hit back to the mound. In frustration, he punched a bat rack and suffered a hairline fracture in his non-throwing hand. He was out of action until the end of July, though he said the incident made him grow up.

==== Major leagues (1988–1989) ====
Johnson made his major league debut on September 15, 1988, against the Pittsburgh Pirates, earning a 9–4 victory with a five-inning outing in which he gave up two runs with five strikeouts; his first victim was Orestes Destrade in the second inning. Johnson posted a record of 3–0 with a 2.42 earned run average (ERA) in four games as a September call-up in 1988. He was the first Montreal pitcher to win his first three MLB starts.

Johnson began the 1989 season with an 0–4 record with a 6.67 ERA in seven games through May 7. He was demoted to Indianapolis on May 9. "I'm too old to cry, but that's what I feel like doing," Johnson said about the move, in part due to his wish to pitch in front of his family on an upcoming Expos west coast road trip. In 11 MLB games pitched in two months with the Expos, he went 3–4 with a 4.69 ERA and one complete game in 55 2/3 innings with 51 strikeouts and 33 walks.

=== Seattle Mariners (1989–1998) ===
==== 1989–1992 ====
On May 25, 1989, The Expos traded Johnson, Gene Harris, and Brian Holman to the Seattle Mariners for All-Star pitcher Mark Langston and a player to be named later, with Mike Campbell sent in July to complete the trade. MLB.com later called the trade the biggest in the Mariners history.

After joining the Mariners during the 1989 season, Johnson led the majors in walks for three consecutive seasons (1990–1992) and hit batsmen in 1992 and 1993. In July 1991, facing the Milwaukee Brewers, the erratic Johnson allowed 4 runs on 1 hit and a career-high 10 walks in 4 innings. A month later, a 9th-inning single cost him a no-hitter against the Oakland Athletics. Johnson suffered another 10-walk, 4-inning start in 1992. Despite the wildness, Johnson showed potential: In 1990, he became the first left-hander to strike out Wade Boggs three times in one game. He threw his first career no-hitter against the Detroit Tigers on June 2, 1990, needing 138 pitches. He was named to his first All-Star team in 1990.

Johnson credited a meeting with Nolan Ryan and Texas Rangers pitching coach Tom House late in the 1992 season with helping him take his career to the next level; Ryan said that he appreciated Johnson's talent and did not want to see him take as long to figure certain things out as he had taken. House recommended a slight change in his delivery; before the meeting, Johnson would land on the heel of his foot after delivering a pitch, and he therefore usually landed offline from home plate. Ryan suggested that he land on the ball of his foot, and almost immediately, he began finding the strike zone more consistently. In a September 27, 1992, game against the Rangers, with Ryan the opposing starting pitcher, Johnson struck out 18 batters in eight innings while throwing 160 pitches, a pitch count that has not been reached in a 9 inning MLB game since.

On Christmas Day in 1992, Johnson's father died of an aortic aneurysm. Johnson was traveling to visit his father, but did not get to speak to him before his death. Devastated by his father's death, Johnson told his mother he was considering quitting baseball, but she convinced him to keep pitching.

==== 1993–1994: Strikeout leader ====
Johnson broke out in 1993, with a 19–8 record, 3.24 ERA and one save, his first of six 300-plus strikeout seasons (308), and the Mariners' franchise record for strikeouts. In May, Johnson again lost a no-hitter to a 9th-inning single; again, the opponent was the Athletics. He also recorded his 1,000th career strikeout against the Minnesota Twins' Chuck Knoblauch. Prior to the trade deadline, Johnson was nearly dealt to the Toronto Blue Jays for Steve Karsay and Mike Timlin. Toronto general manager Pat Gillick had two separate transactions on the table including the one for Johnson with Seattle general manager Woody Woodward and one for Rickey Henderson with Oakland general manager Sandy Alderson. When Gillick was unable to contact Woodward, he agreed to the deal with Alderson. When Woodward returned Gillick's call, he said he would agree to the deal for Johnson. However, Gillick gave his word to Alderson even though the deal had not been finalized.

At the All-Star Game in Baltimore, in a famous incident, Johnson threw a fastball over the head of Philadelphia Phillies first baseman John Kruk. Johnson earned his first MLB save on August 16, also in Baltimore, relieving closer Norm Charlton, who suffered a season-ending injury. On October 3, Johnson entered the final game of the season as a defensive substitution, replacing Brian Turang in left field. This made him the tallest player to play the field in MLB history. Johnson finished second in American League (AL) Cy Young Award voting, losing to Jack McDowell.

That offseason, the New York Yankees attempted to trade for Johnson, but owner George Steinbrenner reportedly would not offer a large contract extension for Johnson. The Mariners signed Johnson to a four-year, $20.25 million extension in December, making him one of the 10 highest paid pitchers at the time.

Johnson was again one of the top pitchers in the AL in the shortened 1994 season, making his third All-Star team and finishing third in Cy Young voting. He again led the majors with 204 strikeouts and also led with four shutouts. Johnson was the final pitcher before the season ended due to the player's strike, striking out Oakland's Ernie Young to seal his AL-best 9th complete game of the season.

==== 1995: Cy Young Award, playoff debut ====
Johnson won the AL Cy Young Award in 1995 with an 18–2 record, 2.48 ERA and 294 strikeouts. His .900 winning percentage was the second highest in AL history, behind Johnny Allen, who had gone 15–1 for the Cleveland Indians in 1937. Johnson became the first regular starting pitcher in history to strike out more than a third of all batters faced. He was the first Seattle pitcher to win the Cy Young Award, later matched by Félix Hernández in 2010. Johnson capped the Mariners' late-season comeback by pitching a three-hitter in the AL West tie-breaker game, crushing the California Angels' hopes with 12 strikeouts. Thus unable to start in the five-game AL Division Series (ALDS) series against the Yankees until the third game, Johnson watched as New York took a 2–0 series lead. He defeated the Yankees in Game 3 with 10 strikeouts in seven innings.

When the series went the full five games, the Mariners having come back from a 2–0 deficit to win both games at the Kingdome, Johnson made a dramatic relief appearance in Game 5 on only one day's rest. Entering a 4–4 game in the ninth inning, Johnson pitched three innings. He allowed one run, struck out six, and held on for the series-ending win in Seattle's dramatic comeback.

==== 1996−1998 ====
Johnson was sidelined throughout much of the 1996 season with a back injury but rebounded in 1997 with a 20–4 record, 291 strikeouts, and a 2.28 ERA (his personal best). Between May 1994 and October 1997, Johnson went 53–9, including a 16–0 streak that fell one short of the AL record. Johnson had two 19-strikeout starts in 1997, on June 24 and August 8.

Another colorful All-Star Game moment proceeded in 1997 involving former Expos teammate Larry Walker, then with the Colorado Rockies. When Johnson started a game against the Rockies on June 12, Walker chose not to play, explaining that "I faced Randy one time in spring training and he almost killed me." In the All-Star Game, Walker batted against Johnson, who theatrically threw over his head. Ever adaptable, Walker placed his batting helmet backwards and switched sides in the batters' box to stand right-handed for one pitch. He ended the plate appearance by drawing a walk. The incident momentarily drew mirth and laughter from players in both dugouts, fans, and announcers as well as comparisons to the at bat with Kruk in the 1993 All-Star Game. In spite of garnering a reputation of avoiding Johnson, Walker batted .393 in 28 at bats against him in his career, nearly double the rate of all left-handed batters at .199. When the 1998 season began, Johnson was upset the Mariners would not offer him a contract extension, given his contract was expiring after the season. Though the Mariners initially wanted to keep Johnson, turning down a trade offer from the Los Angeles Dodgers, they fell out of contention, going 8–20 in June. Minutes before the non-waiver trade deadline, on July 31, the Mariners traded Johnson to the Houston Astros for minor leaguers Freddy García, Carlos Guillén, and John Halama. Johnson was a Mariner for nearly nine years, his longest tenure with one team.

=== Houston Astros (1998) ===
In 11 regular-season starts with the Astros, Johnson posted a 10–1 record, a 1.28 ERA, and 116 strikeouts in 84 1/3 innings, and threw four shutouts. He finished seventh in the National League (NL) Cy Young Award voting, despite pitching only two months in the league, and helped Houston win their second straight NL Central division title. However, the Astros lost the NL Division Series to the San Diego Padres, 3–1. Johnson started Games 1 and 4, both losses. He only gave up three earned runs combined in the two games, but received only one run in support (in Game 4).

=== Arizona Diamondbacks (1999–2004) ===
Johnson agreed to a four-year contract, with an option for a fifth year, for $52.4 million, with the Arizona Diamondbacks, a second-year franchise, in late 1998. Johnson led the team to the playoffs in 1999 on the strength of a 17–9 record and 2.48 ERA with 364 strikeouts, leading the majors in innings, complete games, and strikeouts. Johnson won the NL Cy Young Award and Warren Spahn Award as the best left-handed pitcher in MLB. Johnson became the third MLB pitcher, after Gaylord Perry and Pedro Martínez, to win the Cy Young Award in both the AL and NL; Martínez won the AL Cy Young in 1999. Johnson finished 2000 with 19 wins, 347 strikeouts and a 2.64 ERA, and won his second consecutive NL Cy Young Award and Warren Spahn Award. The Diamondbacks acquired Curt Schilling from the Phillies in July 2000, and the two aces anchored the Diamondbacks rotation.

==== 2001 ====
In the fourth year of the franchise's existence, Johnson and Schilling carried the Diamondbacks to their first World Series appearance and victory in 2001 against the New York Yankees. Johnson and Schilling shared the World Series Most Valuable Player Award, the Babe Ruth Award, and Sports Illustrated's 2001 "Sportsmen of the Year" honor. For the first of two consecutive seasons, Johnson and Schilling finished 1–2 in the NL Cy Young voting. Johnson also won his third consecutive Warren Spahn Award. Johnson's performance was particularly dominating, striking out 11 in a 3-hit shutout in Game 2, pitching seven innings for the victory in Game 6 and then coming on in relief the following day to pick up the win in Game 7. Of Arizona's 11 postseason wins in 2001, Johnson had five. He was the last pitcher to win three games in a single World Series until Yoshinobu Yamamoto in the 2025 World Series. Johnson's Game 7 relief appearance was his second of the 2001 season; on July 19, a game against the Padres was delayed by two electrical explosions in Qualcomm Stadium. When the game resumed the following day, Johnson stepped in as the new pitcher and racked up 16 strikeouts in seven innings, technically setting the record for the most strikeouts in a relief stint.

In 2001, Johnson struck a bird with a pitched ball, resulting in what ABC News described as a "sea of feathers."

In a freak accident on March 24, 2001, at Tucson Electric Park, during the seventh inning of a spring training game against the San Francisco Giants, Johnson threw a fastball to Calvin Murray that struck and killed a dove. The ball was no pitch (neither a ball nor a strike). The event was not unique in baseball history, but it became one of Johnson's most-remembered baseball moments. In 2026, ESPN called it "one of the earliest viral moments in all of sports." Johnson said in 2015 that "he gets asked about the incident nearly as much as he does about winning the World Series later that year." After retiring as a player, Johnson's photography company used a dead bird as its logo.

Johnson struck out 20 batters in a game on May 8, against the Cincinnati Reds. Johnson recorded all 20 strikeouts in the first nine innings and was replaced before the start of the tenth, but because the game went into extra innings, he is ineligible to share the nine-inning game strikeout record. On August 23, Johnson struck out three batters on nine pitches in the 6th inning of a 5–1 loss to Pittsburgh, becoming the 30th pitcher in major league history to pitch an immaculate inning.

Johnson's 2001 season was the second time in MLB history when a starting pitcher had more than twice as many strikeouts in a season (372) as hits allowed (181). Pedro Martínez first reached that ratio in 2000, and it was later also accomplished by Max Scherzer in 2017 and both Gerrit Cole and Justin Verlander in 2019. Johnson also became the second pitcher to strike out 300 more batters than he walked, walking 71 batters against 372 strikeouts (first accomplished by Sandy Koufax who struck out 382 batters against 71 walks in 1965).

==== 2002–2003 ====
In 2002, Johnson won the pitching Triple Crown, leading the NL in wins, ERA, and strikeouts, and was voted his fourth consecutive Cy Young and Warren Spahn Awards. It was Johnson's fourth consecutive 300-strikeout season with the Diamondbacks, and fifth consecutive overall, extending his own MLB record from the previous season in which he set the record for the most consecutive seasons with 300 or more strikeouts in a season by a pitcher. He also became the first pitcher in baseball history to post a 24–5 record.

Johnson spent the majority of the 2003 season on the disabled list and was ineffective in the few injury-hampered starts he did make. He hit the only home run of his career on September 19, 2003, against the Milwaukee Brewers. Johnson was a .125 hitter over 625 career at-bats.

==== 2004 ====
On May 18, 2004, Johnson pitched the 17th perfect game in MLB history. At 40 years of age, he was the oldest pitcher to accomplish this feat. Johnson had 13 strikeouts on his way to a 2–0 victory against the Atlanta Braves. The perfect game made him the fifth pitcher in major league history (after Cy Young, Jim Bunning, Nolan Ryan, and Hideo Nomo) to pitch a no-hitter in both leagues. He also became the fifth pitcher in major league history to throw both a no-hitter and a perfect game in his career (after Young, Bunning, Addie Joss, and Sandy Koufax; since Johnson, Mark Buehrle and Roy Halladay have joined this group).

Johnson struck out Jeff Cirillo of the San Diego Padres on June 29, to become the fourth MLB player to reach 4,000 strikeouts in a career.

He finished the 2004 season with a 16–14 record, though his poor record was partially due to a lack of run support as his ERA that year was 2.60. Johnson led the majors with 290 strikeouts and finished second to Roger Clemens for the Cy Young Award. In games when Arizona scored at least three runs, Johnson was 13–2. As his team only won 51 games that year, his ratio of winning 31.3% of his team's games was the highest for any starting pitcher since Steve Carlton in 1972 (who won 27 of the Phillies' 59 wins for an all-time record ratio of 45.8%).

=== New York Yankees (2005–2006) ===
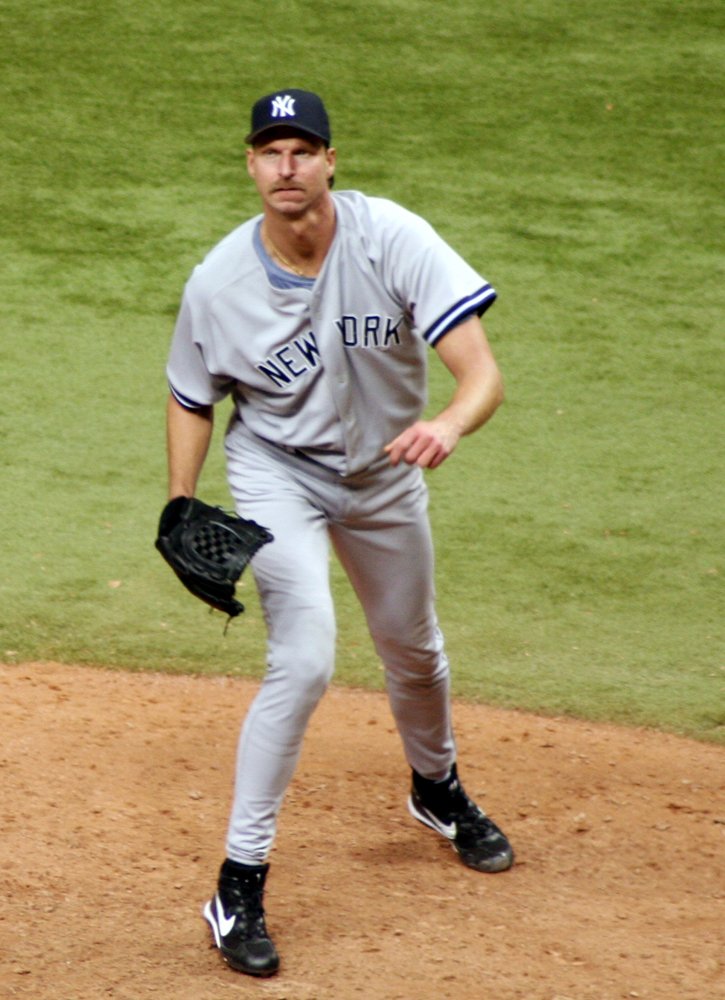
Johnson with the Yankees

The Diamondbacks traded Johnson to the New York Yankees for Javier Vázquez, Brad Halsey, Dioner Navarro, and cash in January 2005. Johnson pitched on Opening Day for the Yankees on April 3, 2005, against the Boston Red Sox. He was inconsistent through 2005, allowing 32 home runs; however, he regained his dominance in late 2005. He was 5–0 against the Yankees' division rival Red Sox and finished the season 17–8 with a 3.79 ERA, and was second in the AL with 211 strikeouts.

In 2005, The Sporting News published an update of their 1999 book Baseball's 100 Greatest Players. Johnson did not make the original edition, but for the 2005 update, with his career totals considerably higher and his 2001 World Championship season taken into account, he was ranked at Number 60.

Johnson was a disappointment in Game 3 of the ALDS against the Los Angeles Angels of Anaheim, allowing 5 runs on 2 home runs in 3 innings. He avoided being charged with the loss when the Yankees rallied but eventually lost. In Game 5 in Anaheim, Johnson made an effective relief appearance with 4 1/3 scoreless innings after Mike Mussina gave up 5 runs and 6 hits to give the Angels a 5–2 lead, but the Yankees were unable to come back in the series.

After an inconclusive year in pinstripes, New York fans hoped that Johnson would return to his dominant style in his second Yankee season. Johnson began 2006 well but then struggled. In between some impressive performances, he allowed 5 or more runs in 7 of his first 18 starts for the season. Johnson was more effective in the second half. Johnson finished the season with a 17–11 record, a subpar 5.00 ERA with only 172 strikeouts. It was revealed at the end of the 2006 season that a herniated disc in Johnson's back had been stiffening him and it was only in his second to last start of the season that he decided to get it checked. This exposure caused him to miss his last start of 2006. After being given epidural anesthesia and a few bullpen sessions he was cleared to start in Game 3 of the ALDS; however, he gave up 5 runs in 5 2/3 innings and being saddled with the loss.

=== Arizona Diamondbacks (second stint) (2007–2008) ===
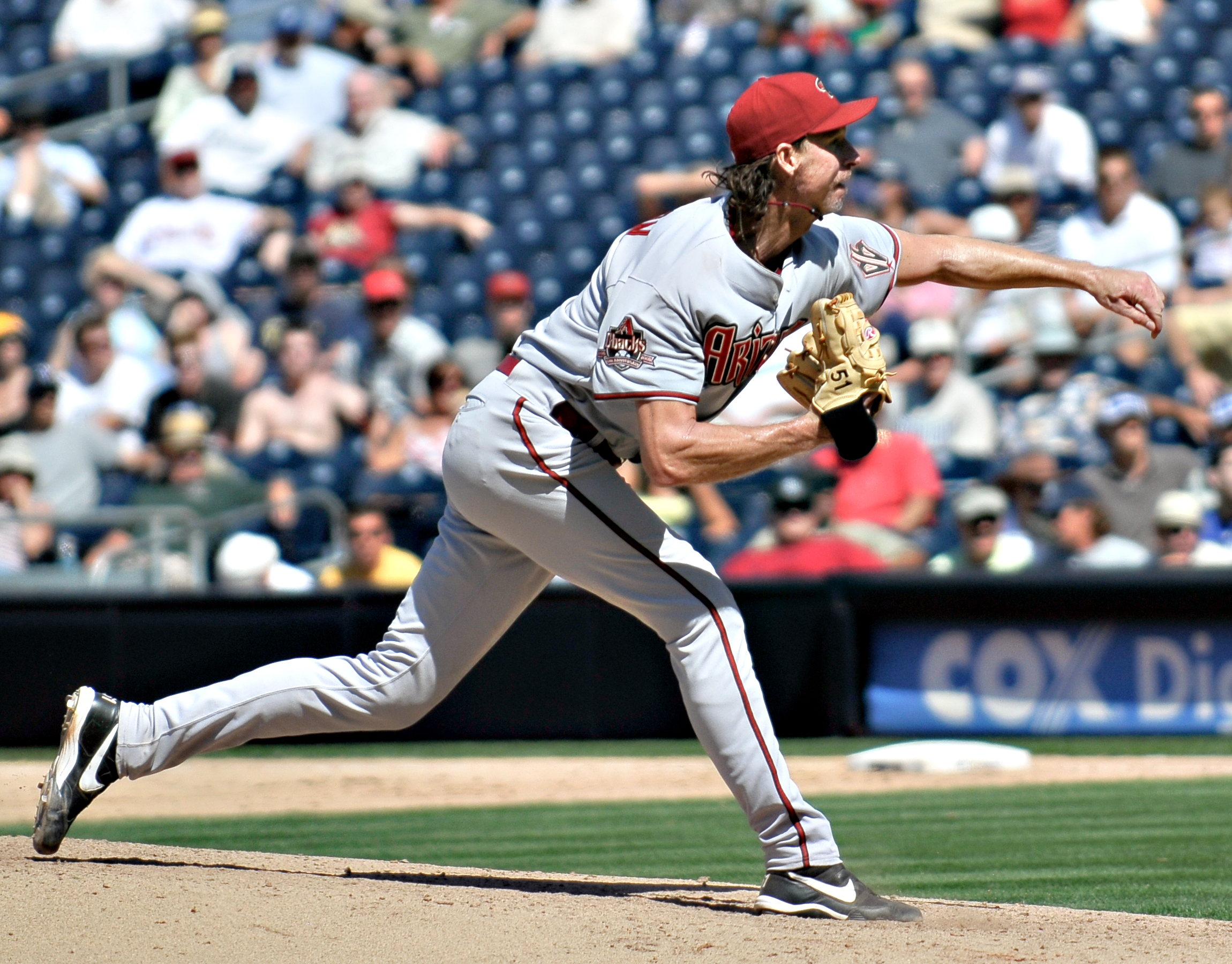
Johnson pitching for the Arizona Diamondbacks

In January 2007, the Yankees traded Johnson back to the Diamondbacks, almost two years to the day that Arizona had traded him to New York, for Luis Vizcaíno, Alberto González, Steven Jackson, and Ross Ohlendorf. The Yankees' decision to trade Johnson was primarily based on a pre-season conversation he had with Yankees general manager Brian Cashman about the importance of being closer to his family in Phoenix after the death of his brother.

Johnson missed most of April, rehabilitating his injured back before returning on April 24. He allowed six runs in 5 innings and took the loss but struck out seven. He returned to form, and by his tenth start of the season was among the NL's top ten strikeout pitchers. But on July 3, his surgically repaired disc from the previous season was reinjured. Johnson had season-ending surgery on the same disc, this time removing it completely. Reporting that the procedure went "a little better than expected", Arizona hoped that Johnson would be ready for the 2008 season.

Johnson made his 2008 debut on April 14 against the San Francisco Giants at AT&T Park, eight months following his back surgery. On June 3, he struck out Mike Cameron of the Milwaukee Brewers for career strikeout number 4,673, surpassing Roger Clemens for second place on the all-time strikeout leaders list. Johnson struck out 8 in the game but allowed six runs as the Diamondbacks lost 7–1. Johnson got his 4,700th career strikeout on July 6. On July 27, Fred Lewis became the first left-handed batter to get four hits against Johnson in a game. In the first at-bat in this game, a fog horn went off as Johnson was releasing his pitch, causing him to throw an eephus pitch which fell for a strike. In his final start of the season, he recorded his 100th career complete game in a 2–1 victory over the Colorado Rockies. He finished the season with an 11–10 record and 3.91 ERA.

=== San Francisco Giants (2009) ===
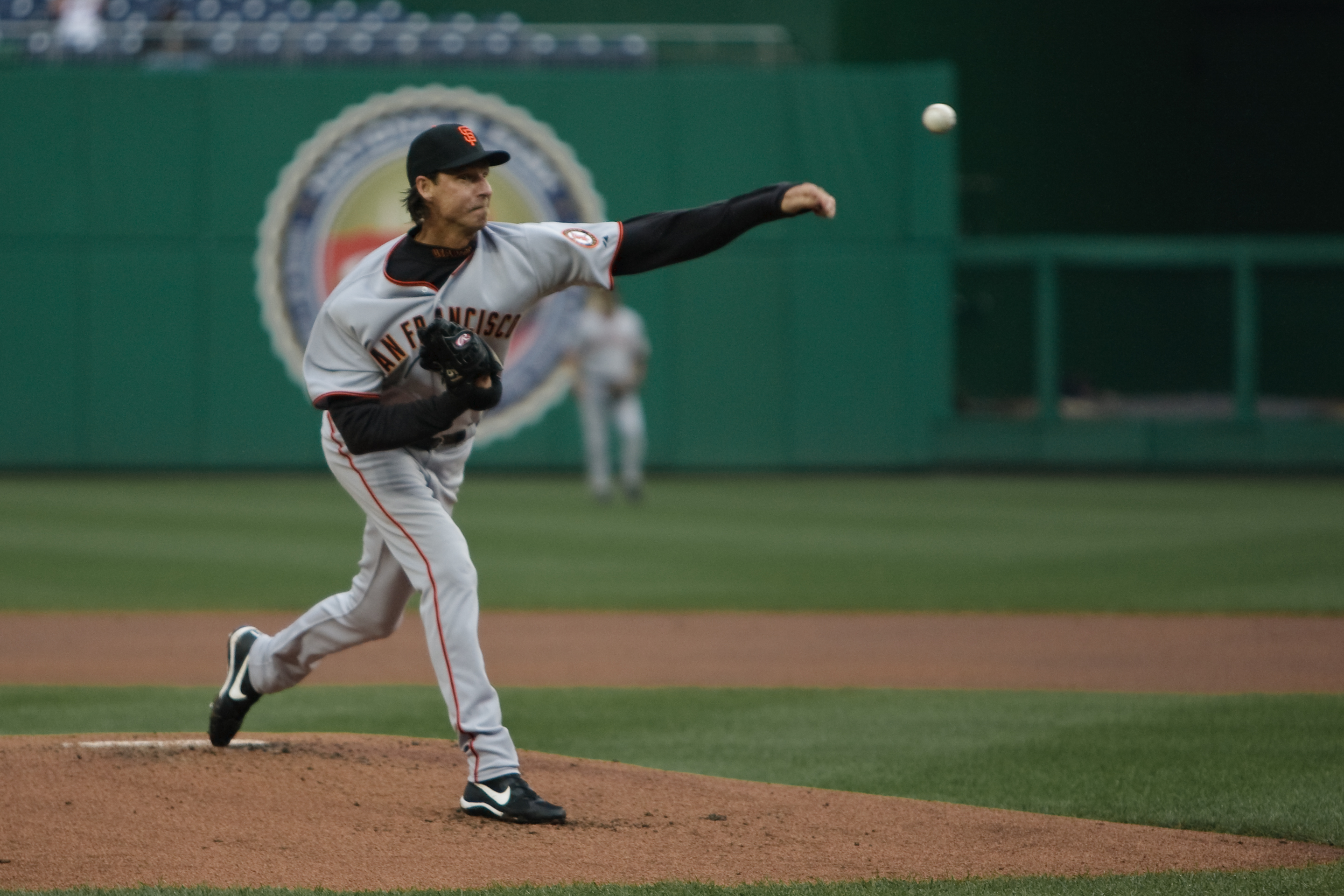
Johnson during his 300th-win game in 2009, pitching for the Giants

On December 26, 2008, Johnson signed a one-year deal with his hometown San Francisco Giants for a reported $8 million, with a possible $2.5 million in performance bonuses and another $2.5 million in award bonuses. Johnson became the 24th pitcher to reach 300 wins, beating the Washington Nationals (the franchise that he first played for when they were known as the Montreal Expos) on June 4 at Nationals Park in Washington, D.C. He became the seventh left-handed pitcher to achieve the 300-win milestone and the fifth pitcher in the last 50 years to get his 299th and 300th win in consecutive starts, joining Warren Spahn, Steve Carlton, Gaylord Perry, and Tom Seaver. Johnson was placed on the 60-day disabled list with a torn rotator cuff in his throwing shoulder on July 28. Johnson was activated by the Giants on September 16 and assigned to the Giants bullpen. On September 19, Johnson made his first relief appearance in four years, getting only one of three Dodgers batters out. At age 46, he was at the time the second oldest player in MLB, trailing only former Mariners teammate Jamie Moyer.

== Pitching style ==
In the prime of his career, Johnson's fastball was clocked as high as 102 mph (164 km/h), with a low three-quarters delivery (nearly sidearm). His signature pitch was a slider that broke down and away from left-handed hitters and down and in to right-handed hitters. The effectiveness of the pitch is marked by its velocity being in the low 90s along with tight late break; hitters often believed they were thrown a fastball until the ball broke just before it crossed home plate. Right-handed hitters have swung through and missed sliders that nearly hit their back foot. Johnson dubbed his slider "Mr. Snappy". In later years, his fastball declined to the 96 mph (154 km/h) range and his slider clocked at around 87 mph (140 km/h). Johnson also threw a split-finger fastball that behaved like a change-up and a sinker to induce ground balls .

In a 2012 appearance on The Dan Patrick Show, Adam Dunn, a left-handed batter, was asked who the best pitcher he faced was. "Honestly, Randy Johnson when he was good. It's hopeless. It's like a hopeless feeling. The first time you face him you feel like he's going to hit you right in the back of the neck when he throws it, like every pitch is going to hit you in the back of the neck. And it ends up down and away for a strike and you just have to trust it's going to be a strike, and heaven forbid he doesn't lose one out there and heaven forbid, there goes your cheek," Dunn said.

== Legacy ==
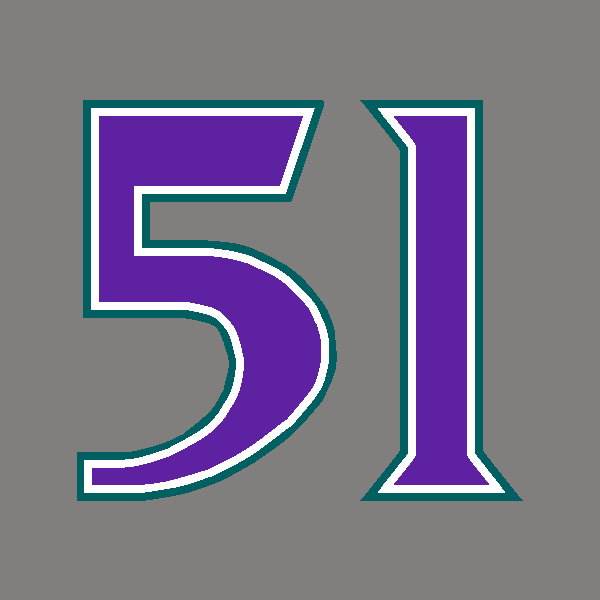
Randy Johnson's number 51 was retired by the Arizona Diamondbacks in 2015.

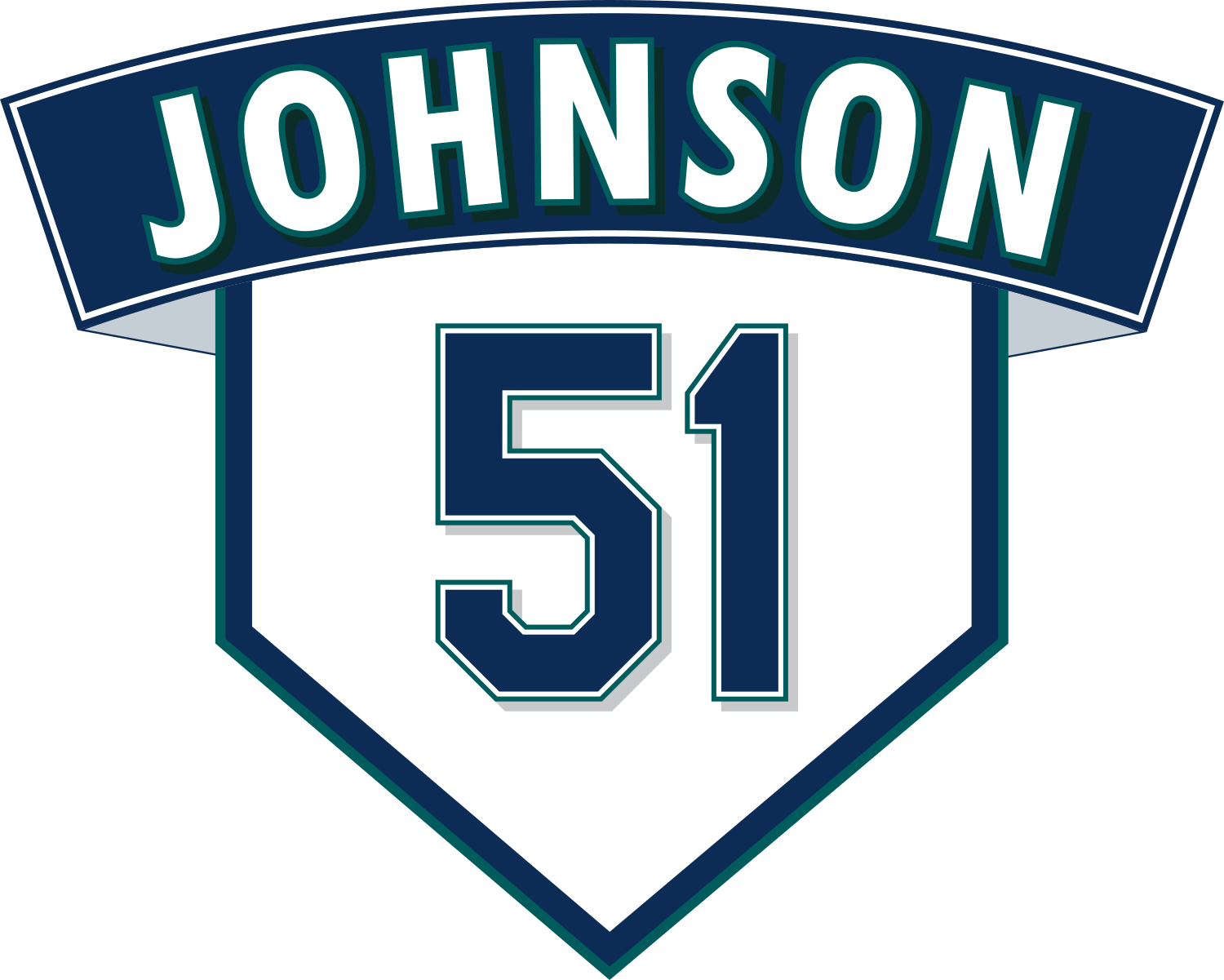
Randy Johnson's number 51 was retired by the Seattle Mariners in 2026.

On January 5, 2010, Johnson announced his retirement from professional baseball. The Mariners invited Johnson to throw out the ceremonial first pitch at the Seattle Mariners home opener at Safeco Field on April 12, 2010 and inducted Johnson into the Mariners Hall of Fame on January 17, 2012. The Diamondbacks invited Johnson and former teammate Curt Schilling to both throw out the ceremonial first pitches for the Arizona Diamondbacks' recognition of the 10th anniversary of the 2001 World Series team that defeated the New York Yankees. On July 27, 2024, Johnson was inducted into the Arizona Diamondbacks Hall of Fame along with teammate Luis Gonzalez.

Johnson was selected to the Baseball Hall of Fame in his first year of eligibility in 2015. On his Hall of Fame plaque he wears a Diamondbacks cap, the first—and only, as of 2026—Hall of Famer to do so. The Diamondbacks retired his number on August 8, 2015. At the retirement ceremony, Johnson was presented with a replica of the drum set used by Neil Peart, drummer for the Canadian band Rush, during their 30th anniversary tour.

Johnson has participated in over 40 trips with the United Service Organizations. He also supports initiatives to fight homelessness. In recognition of all his charitable efforts, he was the Hall of Fame recipient of the Bob Feller Act of Valor Award in 2019.

In January 2015, Johnson was named a special assistant to Diamondbacks president Derrick Hall.

In 2020, sportswriter Joe Posnanski ranked Johnson at number 28 on his "Baseball 100" list for The Athletic. In 2022, The Sporting News named Johnson on their "Phoenix Mount Rushmore of Sports", along with Arizona Cardinals football player Larry Fitzgerald, Phoenix Suns basketball player Steve Nash, Phoenix Mercury basketball player Diana Taurasi.

On June 2, 2025, the Seattle Mariners announced that that franchise would retire Johnson's number in 2026. It was the fifth number retired by the franchise. Johnson attended and participated in the team's number retirement ceremony for fellow #51 Ichiro Suzuki on August 9, after attending Suzuki's Baseball Hall of Fame ceremony on July 27. On May 2, 2026, Johnson's #51 was retired by the Mariners, thus becoming the 12th player in MLB history to have his number retired by multiple MLB teams.

== Personal life ==
Johnson and his wife have four children, born from 1994 to 1999. He also has a daughter born in 1989 from a previous relationship. He resides in Paradise Valley, Arizona.

=== "Big Unit" nickname ===
During batting practice in 1988, the 6-foot-10-inch (2.08 m) Johnson, then with the Montreal Expos, collided head-first with outfielder Tim Raines, prompting his teammate to exclaim, "Damn! You're a big unit!" The nickname stuck.

Throughout much of his career, Johnson was the tallest player in MLB history. Pitchers Eric Hillman, Andrew Sisco, Andrew Brackman, and Chris Young were also 6 ft 10 in. Johnson's height record was surpassed by former Arizona teammate Jon Rauch, a reliever who is 6 ft 11 in (2.11 m), and later matched by Sean Hjelle.

=== Photography career ===
Since retiring from baseball, Johnson has pursued a career as a photographer. He studied photojournalism at the University of Southern California. He has done photography work for NFL games, a tour of the rock band Rush, and has done wildlife photography.

=== Acting career ===
Johnson guest-starred in The Simpsons episode "Bart Has Two Mommies", which aired on March 19, 2006. Johnson appeared in the movie Little Big League, playing himself.

Johnson appeared in a Just for Men commercial where he had a grey beard and his neighbors told him "Your beard is weird." Johnson also appeared in a Right Guard commercial where he fired dodgeballs at Kyle Brandt, who represented odor. Johnson also appeared in several commercials for Nike in 1998. The spots comedically portrayed him taking batting practice (swinging ineptly at balls from a pitching machine) in his hope that he would break Roger Maris's then-single-season record for home runs. He made a cameo appearance in a commercial for MLB 2K9 with teammate Tim Lincecum. Johnson appeared in a GEICO commercial. In 2012, he appeared in a TV ad for Pepsi Max. In 2016, Johnson appeared in a TV ad for the Mini Clubman.

In 2022, Johnson appeared with his former teammates Ken Griffey Jr. and Alex Rodriguez as well as Hall of Famer David Ortiz in a commercial for the streaming service DirecTV Stream parodying Ghostbusters, as the group (titled Goatbusters) battles a giant Mr. Redlegs destroying a baseball stadium.

Johnson has been featured as a playable character in various Backyard Baseball games.

Johnson appeared in the episode "Control" on Franklin & Bash as himself.

== Career accomplishments ==
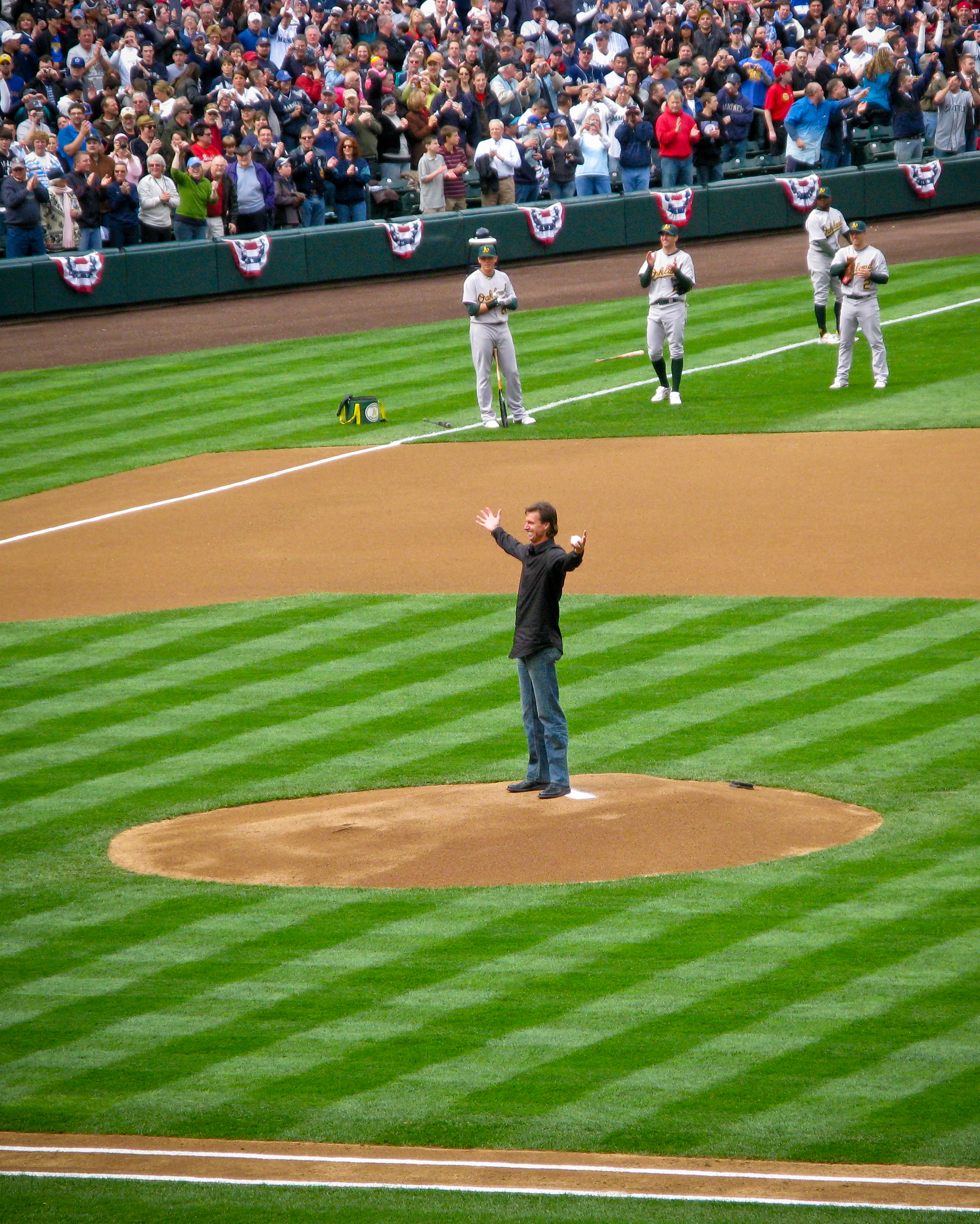
Johnson throwing out the ceremonial first pitch at the Seattle Mariners 2010 home opener

- Pitched his first no-hitter for Seattle (their first) on June 2, 1990, against Detroit
- 10-time All-Star (1990, 1993–1995, 1997, 1999–2002, 2004)
- Led the league in strikeouts nine times (1992–1995, 1999–2002, 2004)
- Led the league in ERA four times (1995, 1999, 2001, 2002)
- Pitching Triple Crown (2002)
- 5-time Cy Young Award winner (1995, 1999–2002)
- 4-time Warren Spahn Award winner (1999–2002)
- Most strikeouts in a relief appearance (16 against San Diego on July 18, 2001)
- Held the records for single-season and career strikeout per 9 innings: 13.41 and 10.61, respectively (both since surpassed)
- Most games with 11, 12, 13, 14, or 15 or more strikeouts
- World Series co-MVP (with Curt Schilling in 2001)
- Co-winner of the Babe Ruth Award (with Schilling in 2001)
- Co-winner of the Sports Illustrated Sportsman of the Year award (with Schilling in 2001)
- Pitched a perfect game for Arizona against Atlanta (May 18, 2004) – oldest pitcher to do so in major-league history
- Sports Illustrated MLB All-Decade Team (2009)
- Defeated every major-league team at least once
- Most strikeouts in a game by a left-handed pitcher, struck out 20 batters on May 8, 2001, against Cincinnati Reds (note: Johnson collected his 20th strikeout in the ninth inning of the game, but the game entered extra innings. Although he did not pitch in the 10th inning, by rule Johnson is not eligible to share the single-game strikeout record for a nine inning game.)
- Set American League record for strikeouts in a nine-inning game by a left-handed pitcher with 19 against the Oakland Athletics and later the Chicago White Sox in 1997
- 4,875 strikeouts, most all-time for left-handed pitcher; second most ever (Nolan Ryan, 5,714)
- 212 games with at least 10 strikeouts, most all-time for a left-handed pitcher; second most ever behind Nolan Ryan (215)
- Pitched an immaculate inning on August 23, 2001, against the Pittsburgh Pirates
- Elected to the National Baseball Hall of Fame on 97.3% of the vote on January 6, 2015, third-highest percentage of all time for pitchers; formally inducted on July 26.
- Inducted into Seattle Mariners Hall of Fame and Arizona Diamondbacks Hall of Fame

== See also ==
- Seattle Mariners award winners and league leaders
- Houston Astros award winners and league leaders
- Arizona Diamondbacks award winners and league leaders
- List of Seattle Mariners team records
- List of Arizona Diamondbacks team records
- List of Major League Baseball annual ERA leaders
- List of Major League Baseball annual shutout leaders
- List of Major League Baseball annual strikeout leaders
- List of Major League Baseball annual wins leaders
- List of Major League Baseball career bases on balls allowed leaders
- List of Major League Baseball career games started leaders
- List of Major League Baseball career hit batsmen leaders
- List of Major League Baseball career innings pitched leaders
- List of Major League Baseball career strikeout leaders
- List of Major League Baseball career WHIP leaders
- List of Major League Baseball career wins leaders
- List of Major League Baseball individual streaks
- List of Major League Baseball no-hitters
- List of Major League Baseball perfect games
- List of Major League Baseball single-game strikeout leaders
- List of Major League Baseball titles leaders
- List of Major League Baseball pitchers who have thrown an immaculate inning
- Major League Baseball Triple Crown
- List of World Series starting pitchers

Awards and achievements
Preceded by Erik Hanson; Jeff Fassero	Seattle Mariners Opening Day; Starting Pitcher; 1992 – 1996; 1998	Succeeded by Jeff Fassero; Jeff Fassero
Preceded by Andy Benes	Arizona Diamondbacks Opening Day; Starting Pitcher; 1999 – 2004	Succeeded by Javier Vázquez
Preceded by Mark Langston & Mike Witt; Roy Oswalt, Peter Munro, Kirk Saarloos, Brad Lidge, Octavio Dotel & Billy Wagner	No hitter pitcher June 2, 1990; May 18, 2004	Succeeded by Nolan Ryan; Aníbal Sánchez
Preceded by David Cone	Perfect game pitcher May 18, 2004	Succeeded by Mark Buehrle
Preceded by Jimmy Key; Charles Nagy	American League All-Star Game Starting Pitcher; 1995; 1997	Succeeded by Charles Nagy; David Wells
Preceded by Curt Schilling	National League All-Star Game Starting Pitcher; 2000–2001	Succeeded by Curt Schilling
