= Sean Doolittle =

American baseball player (born 1986)

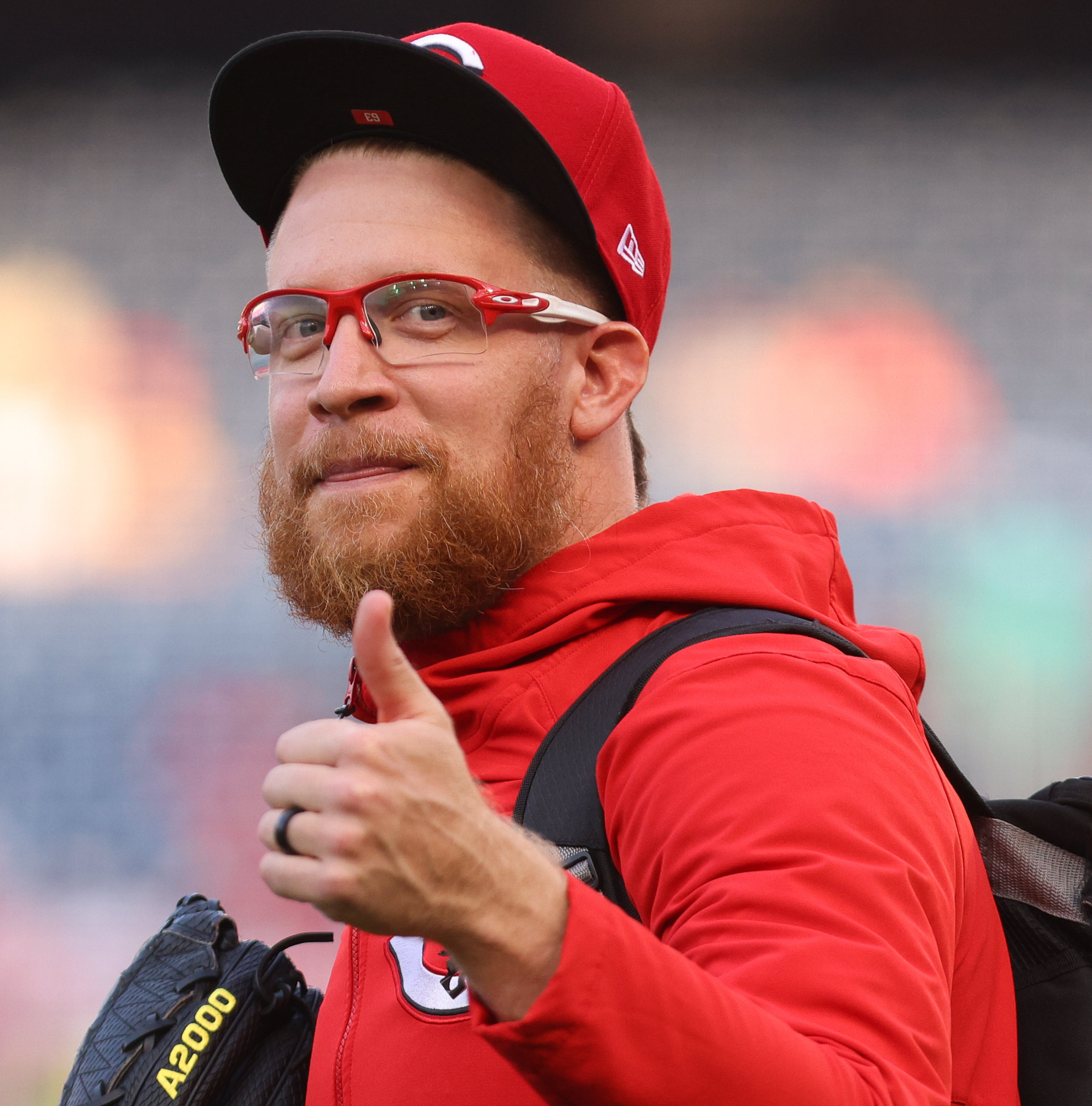
- Doolittle with the Cincinnati Reds in 2021

Washington Nationals – No. 63
- Pitcher / Pitching coach
- Born: September 26, 1986 (age 40); Rapid City, South Dakota, U.S.
- Batted: Left Threw: Left

MLB debut
- June 5, 2012, for the Oakland Athletics

Last MLB appearance
- April 19, 2022, for the Washington Nationals

MLB statistics
- Win–loss record: 26–24
- Earned run average: 3.20
- Strikeouts: 522
- Saves: 112
- Stats at Baseball Reference

Teams
- As player: Oakland Athletics (2012–2017); Washington Nationals (2017–2020); Cincinnati Reds (2021); Seattle Mariners (2021); Washington Nationals (2022); As coach: Washington Nationals (2024–present)

Career highlights and awards
- 2× All-Star (2014, 2018); World Series champion (2019)
Medals
Men's baseball
Representing United States
World University Championship
Gold medal – first place	2006 Havana	Team

Sean Robert Doolittle (born September 26, 1986) is an American former professional baseball pitcher and current coach for the Washington Nationals of Major League Baseball (MLB). He played in MLB for the Oakland Athletics, Nationals, Cincinnati Reds, and Seattle Mariners.

The Athletics selected Doolittle in the first round in the 2007 MLB draft, as a first baseman and outfielder. He made his MLB debut in 2012 as a pitcher. He was an All-Star in 2014 and 2018. He won the 2019 World Series with the Nationals, earning a save in Game 1.

After retiring with the Nationals in 2023, he became a coach with the team.

== Early life ==
Doolittle was born in South Dakota. His father served in the Air Force and moved his family to California and later Tabernacle Township, New Jersey, where Doolittle grew up. Doolittle first attended Major League Baseball games at the Oakland Coliseum, later his homefield as a pitcher. In New Jersey, he lived close to the baseball field and often went there to practice. He played Babe Ruth Baseball as a pitcher.

Doolittle attended Shawnee High School in Medford, New Jersey, where he was a standout pitcher. He led Shawnee to a state championship in 2003. He was named the New Jersey high school player of the year by Baseball America, Gatorade, and the Star-Ledger. He was drafted by the Atlanta Braves in the 39th round of the 2004 MLB draft but did not sign with the team.

Doolittle played for the University of Virginia Cavaliers as both a starting pitcher and first baseman. He held the record for career wins for a Virginia pitcher, 22, later surpassed by Danny Hultzen. In 2005, he played collegiate summer baseball with the Harwich Mariners of the Cape Cod Baseball League. In 2006, he was the Atlantic Coast Conference Player of the Year. In 2005 and 2006, Doolittle played for the collegiate U.S. national baseball team as a two-way player. He tied for the team lead with five doubles in 2005, batting .347. He batted 2-for-6 with a double in the 2006 World University Championship final, as the U.S. defeated Chinese Taipei.

== Playing career ==
=== Oakland Athletics ===
==== 2007–2010: Drafted as a position player ====
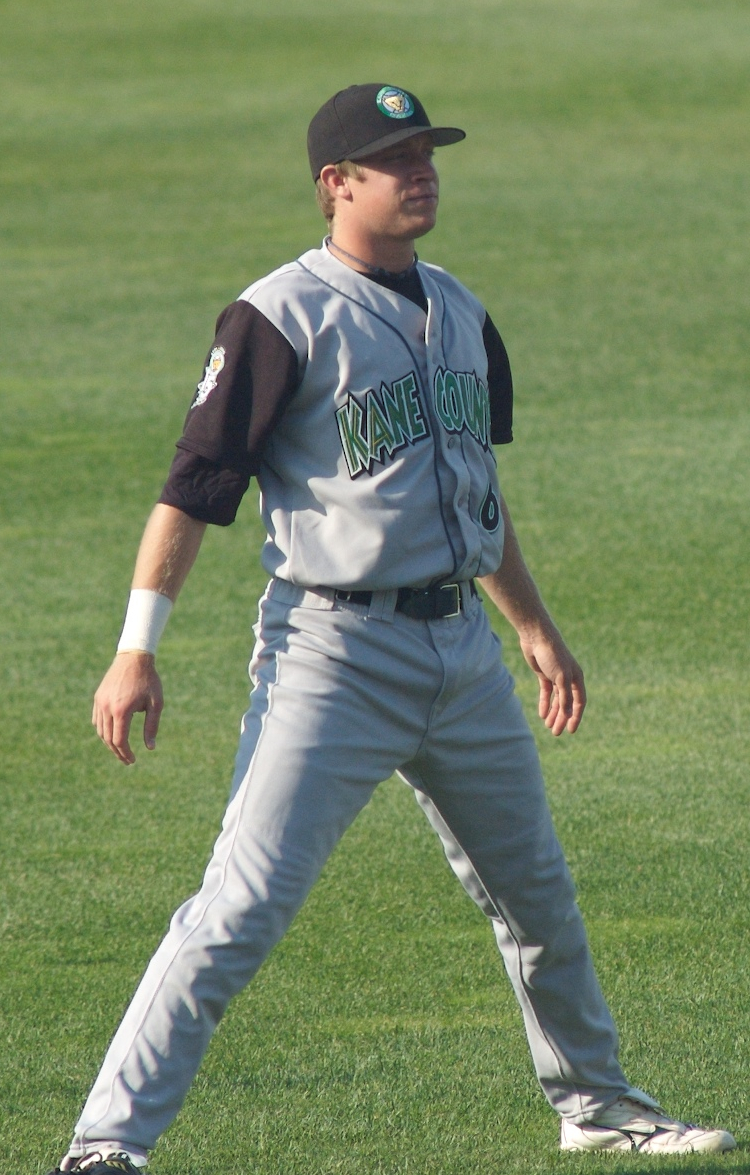
Doolittle with the Kane County Cougars in 2007

The Oakland Athletics selected Doolittle in the first round, with the 41st overall selection, in the 2007 Major League Baseball draft as a first baseman and outfielder. He signed with the Athletics for $742,500. He made his professional debut in late June 2007 with the Vancouver Canadians. After 13 games, he was promoted to the Kane County Cougars. He batted .243 with 4 home runs in 68 games combined in 2007. 2008 was Doolittle's only full minor league season as a batter. He started the year with the Class-A Advanced Stockton Ports and was named to the California League All-Star team before advancing to the Double-A Midland RockHounds in July. He hit for a .945 on-base plus slugging in Stockton, which fell to .699 with Midland. After the season, he played for the Phoenix Desert Dogs in the Arizona Fall League.

Doolittle started 2009 with the Triple-A Sacramento River Cats, but his season ended in early May. He was placed on the disabled list with a strained right knee on May 9. Despite being injured for most of 2009, Doolittle was ranked 10th in Oakland's farm system by Baseball America entering 2010. Doolittle missed the 2010 season rehabbing from two knee surgeries. He was close to returning to Triple-A in the summer of 2010, but popped a tendon in his right wrist during a swing, requiring more rehabilitation and ending a comeback attempt. On November 10, 2010, he was added to Oakland's 40-man roster to be protected from the Rule 5 draft.

==== 2011–2012: Switch to reliever ====
After missing more than two years, Doolittle converted back to pitching, making his professional pitching debut with the Rookie league AZL Athletics in August 2011. In 2012, Doolittle quickly advanced through the minors as a reliever before making his MLB debut. He pitched 6 games for Stockton in April, followed by 8 games for Midland, then two games with Sacramento. With all three teams, he allowed only 2 earned runs and two extra base hits, both doubles, while striking out 48 batters in 25 innings.

==== 2012–2013: MLB debut and setup role ====
After pitching just 26 professional innings, Doolittle was called up to the majors on June 5, 2012, against the Texas Rangers, pitching 1 1/3 inning with three strikeouts. He threw only fastballs in his debut, all between 93.2 and 96.2 miles per hour. He quickly became a key bullpen piece as the top lefty specialist, earning his first career save on July 21 against the New York Yankees. He served as a setup man for closer Grant Balfour the rest of the season, as Oakland won the American League (AL) West on the final day of the season. Doolittle pitched in 3 postseason games, including blowing a save in Game 1 of the AL Division Series (ALDS).

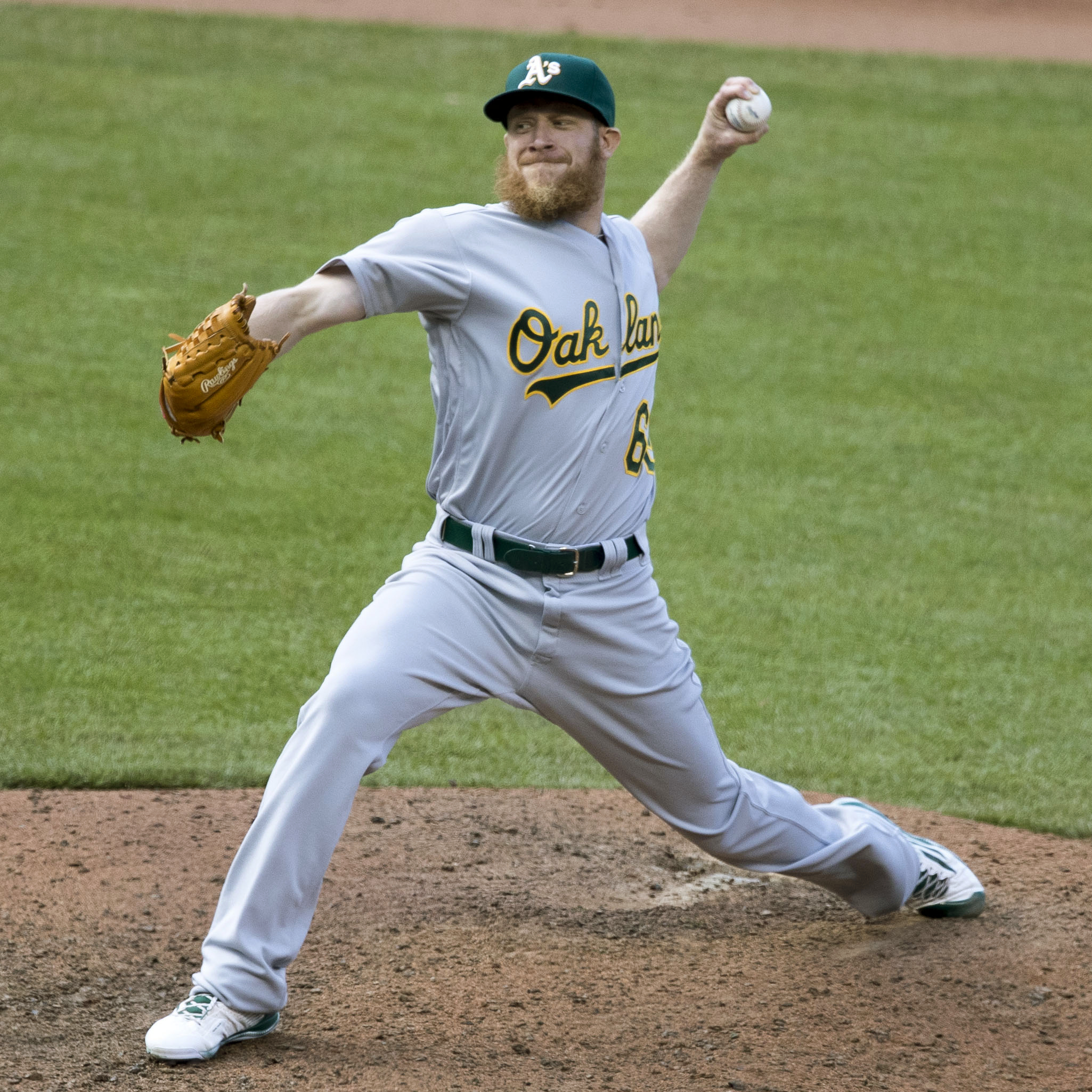
Doolittle with the Athletics in 2016

In 2013, Doolittle pitched in a career high 69 innings and 70 games. Still in a setup role, he has a 5–5 record with two saves and a 3.13 ERA. He allowed only 6.3 percent of inherited baserunners to score, having the highest strand of all relievers. In the postseason, he took the loss in Game 4 of the ALDS after giving up a game-tying home run to Víctor Martínez of the Detroit Tigers.

==== 2014: Extension and All-Star ====
Doolittle signed a five-year, $10.5 million extension with the Athletics on April 18, 2014.

Doolittle and righty Luke Gregerson entered the regular season as late-inning setup pitchers for new closer Jim Johnson. However, after an abysmal April, Johnson was removed from the closing role. Doolittle, Gregerson, and Johnson spent the next three weeks pitching under closer by committee. Doolittle was ultimately named A's closer on May 20. Doolittle was one of six A's players named to the AL All-Star team. He had two strikeouts and allowed a single in the game's 8th inning. He finished the regular season with a 2–4 record with 22 saves, the most saves by an Athletics left-handed pitcher in a season. He had a 11.13 strikeout-to-walk ratio, second among all pitchers that year behind Phil Hughes. He had a poor showing in his third straight postseason, blowing a save in the ninth inning of a Wild Card Game loss to the Kansas City Royals.

==== 2015–2017: Limited by injuries ====
Doolittle began the 2015 season on the disabled list due to a shoulder injury. He pitched once for Oakland on May 27 before going on the 60-day disabled list with a strained left shoulder. He returned nearly 3 months later and pitched in 11 games toward the end of the season. He had 1 win, 4 saves and a 3.95 ERA in 13 2/3 innings.

The Athletics gave away 15,000 Doolittle garden gnomes on April 30, 2016. The gnome played a short clip of Metallica's For Whom the Bell Tolls, Doolittle's entrance music. Doolittle did not pitch in the game. In his last full season with the Athletics, Doolittle missed all of July and August with a strained shoulder. He earned 4 saves before the injury and returned to a setup role behind closer Ryan Madson.

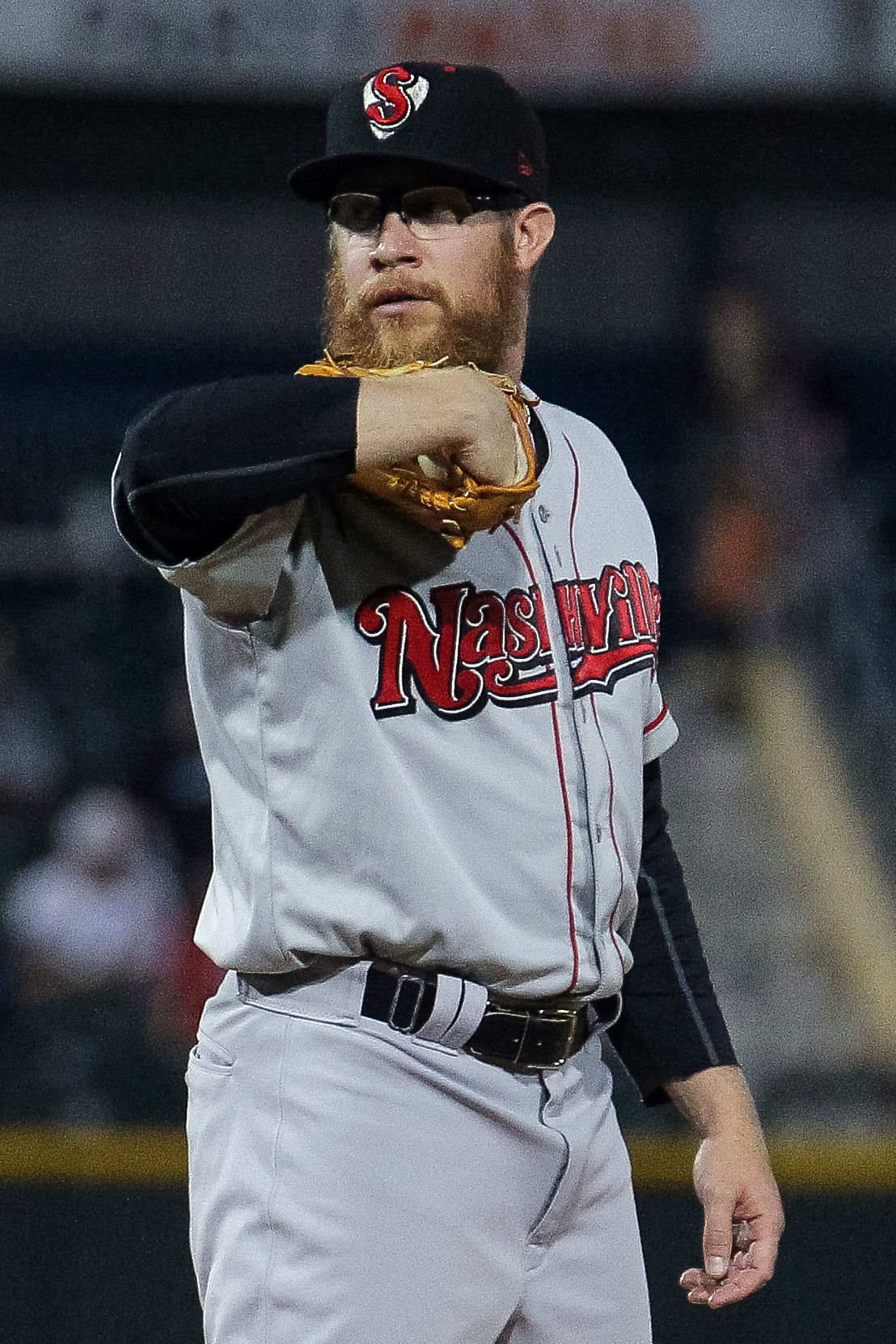
Doolittle pitching in a combined no-hitter for Nashville in 2017

Doolittle missed more than a month with another shoulder strain in early 2017. On June 7, while on rehab assignment with the Triple-A Nashville Sounds, Doolittle pitched the seventh inning of a combined no-hitter, immediately following starter Chris Smith. Relievers Tucker Healy and Simón Castro closed out the game. Doolittle earned his final save with the A's on June 18 and his final win on July 8, pitching a scoreless inning with one strikeout in each game.

=== Washington Nationals ===
==== 2017–2018: Closer and All-Star ====
On July 16, 2017, the Athletics traded Doolittle and Madson to the Washington Nationals for reliever Blake Treinen and prospects Jesús Luzardo and Sheldon Neuse. After having only 4 save opportunities with Oakland, Doolittle immediately became the Nationals' closer. After taking a Southwest Airlines flight from Oakland to join the Nationals in Anaheim, Doolittle earned his first save with his new team on July 18. He allowed one run and two baserunners but promised after the game that "they won’t all be like that." Doolittle, Madson, and fellow mid-season trade acquisition Brandon Kintzler improved the Nationals' bullpen, which had the lowest ERA in the last three innings of a game in the NL following the trade for Doolittle and Madson, en route to a National League (NL) East division title. In 30 games for the Nationals, Doolittle was 1–0 with a 2.40 ERA in 30 innings, going 21-for-22 in save opportunities. He won the NL Reliever of the Month Award for September. He earned his first postseason save in Game 2 of the NL Division Series, pitching a scoreless ninth inning.

Doolittle started 2018 strong as the Nationals' closer. He had 22 saves in 23 in opportunities in his first 35 games, but on July 11 was placed on the disabled list with inflammation on a toe on his left foot. That day, he was also named his second and final All-Star team, but he did not pitch in the All-Star Game due to the toe injury. He came off the disabled list on September 7. For the year, he was 3–3 with 25 saves, 7th most in the NL, and a 1.60 ERA. He had 60 strikeouts in 45 innings, striking out 36.8 percent of batters, 10th highest in the majors. He threw a four-seam fastball 89 percent of the time, most in MLB. His fastball also had more rise than any other pitcher.

==== 2019: World Series Champion ====
In 2019, Doolittle was 6–5 with a career high 29 saves, 6th most in the NL, and a 4.05 ERA. He struck out 66 batters in 60 innings. He led the NL with 55 games finished. However, after allowing three home runs in a blown saves against the Milwaukee Brewers on August 17, Doolittle was placed on the injured list with knee tendinitis. When he returned to the bullpen in September, he was in a "fireman" setup role behind new closer Daniel Hudson.

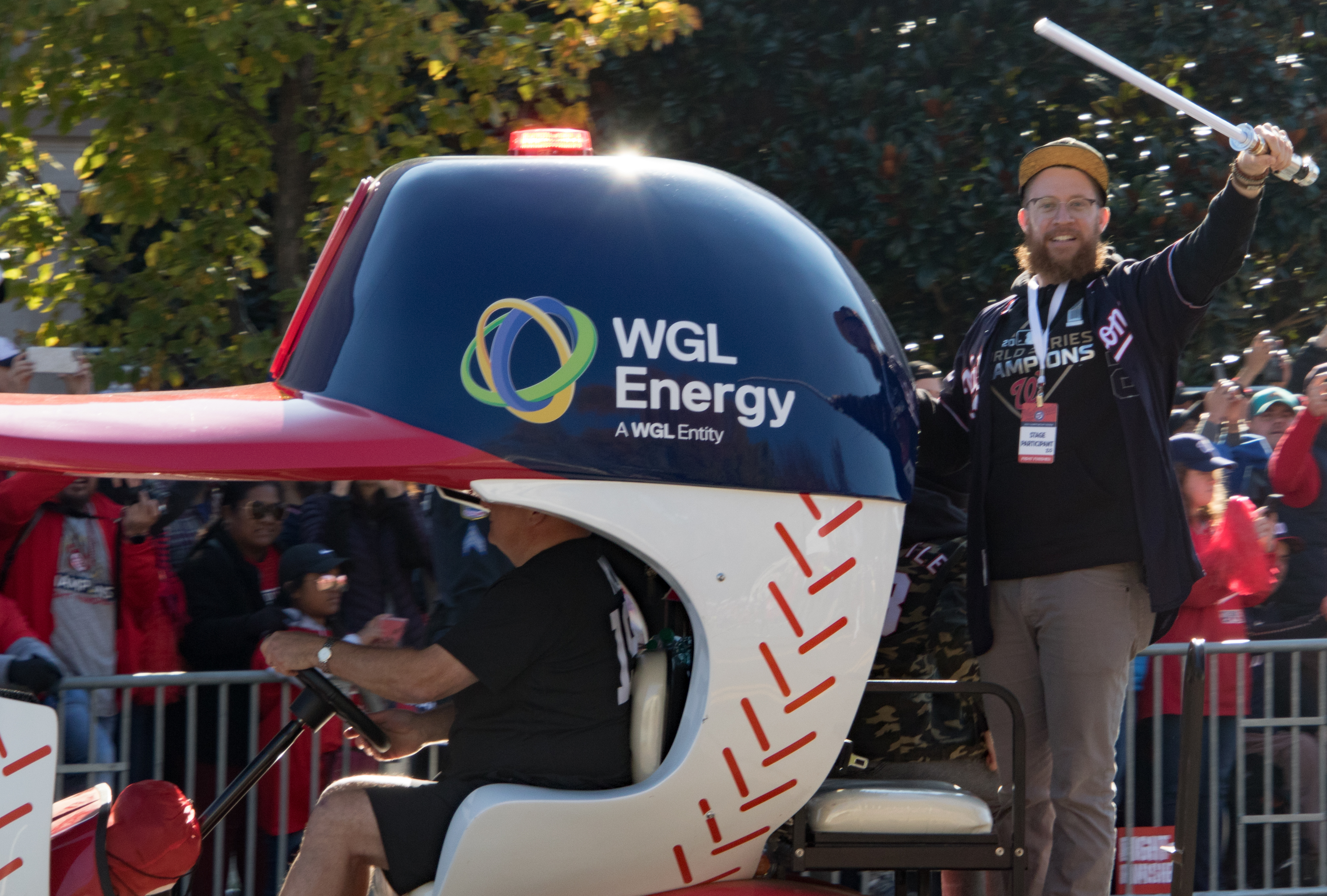
Doolittle on a bullpen cart in the 2019 World Series parade, holding a lightsaber

In the postseason, Doolittle allowed 2 runs in 10 1/3 innings. He had a four-out save in Game 1 of the NL Championship Series, in the closer's role because Hudson was on paternity leave. Doolittle later publicly supported Hudson's decision to leave the Nationals to help his wife in childbirth. Doolittle had another four-out save in Game 1 of the World Series. He started adding lavender oil to his glove in the postseason to calm his nerves. He celebrated in the Nationals championship parade by carrying a lightsaber on the team's bullpen cart.

==== 2020 ====
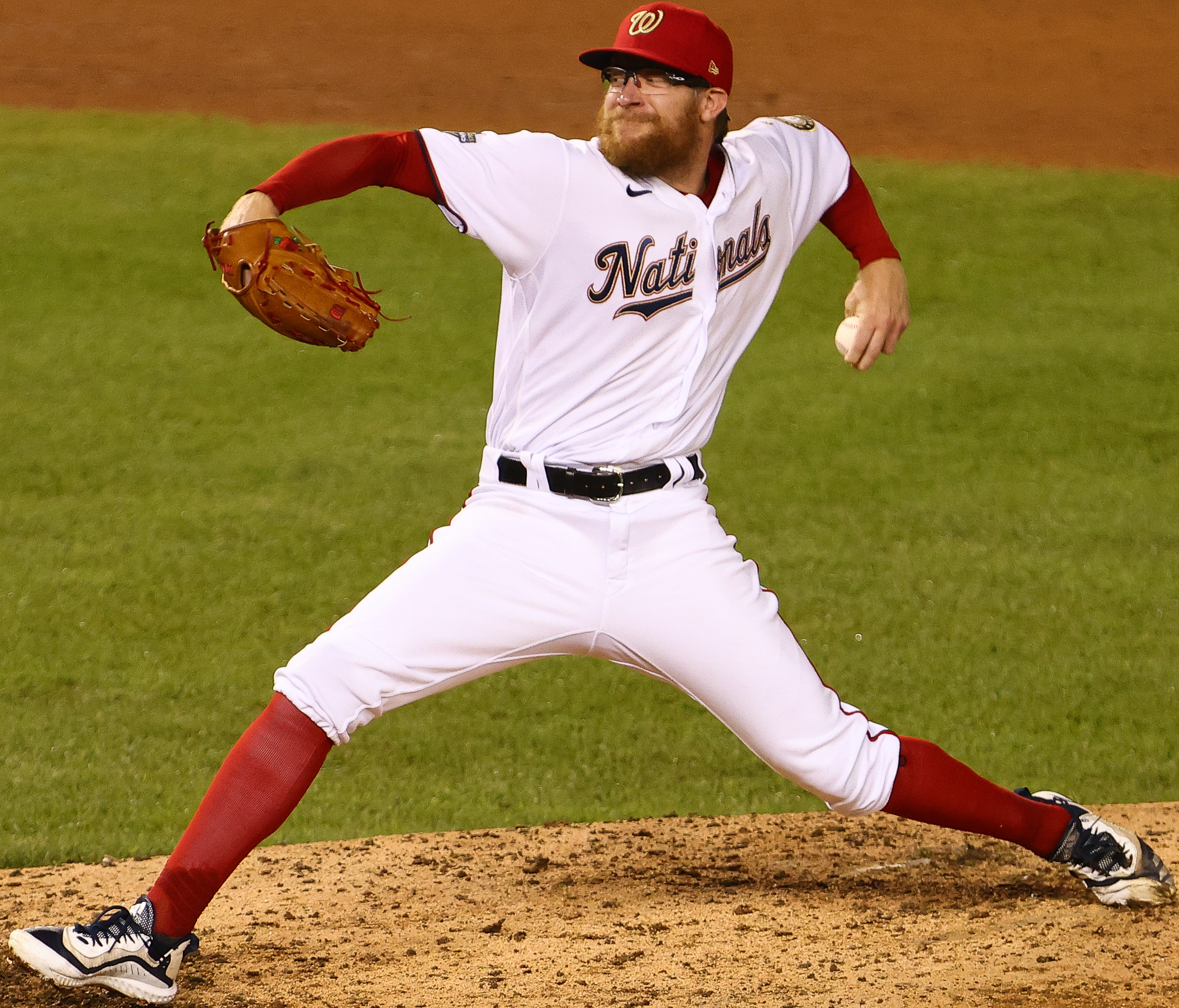
Doolittle pitching in his final game in 2020

Doolittle again dealt with injuries, with two stints on the injured list in the shortened 2020 season. On August 13, he was placed on the injured list with right knee fatigue after his first five games. Shortly after being reinstated, he suffered an oblique strain on September 10. That was his final game of 2020. He ended the season with an 0–2 record and 5.87 ERA in 7 2/3 innings in 11 games. He became a free agent on October 28.

=== Cincinnati Reds and Seattle Mariners (2021) ===
On February 8, 2021, Doolittle signed a one-year, $1.5 million contract with the Cincinnati Reds. He appeared in 45 games for the Reds to begin the season, with a 3–1 record and 1 save in 5 opportunities, posting a 4.46 ERA with 41 strikeouts 38 1/3 innings. On August 24, Doolittle was designated for assignment by the Reds.

On August 26, the Seattle Mariners claimed Doolittle off of waivers. In 11 games with the Mariners, Doolittle pitched 11 1/3 innings with a 4.76 ERA with 12 strikeouts. He became a free agent again on November 3.

=== Washington Nationals (second stint) ===
==== 2022: Final MLB games ====
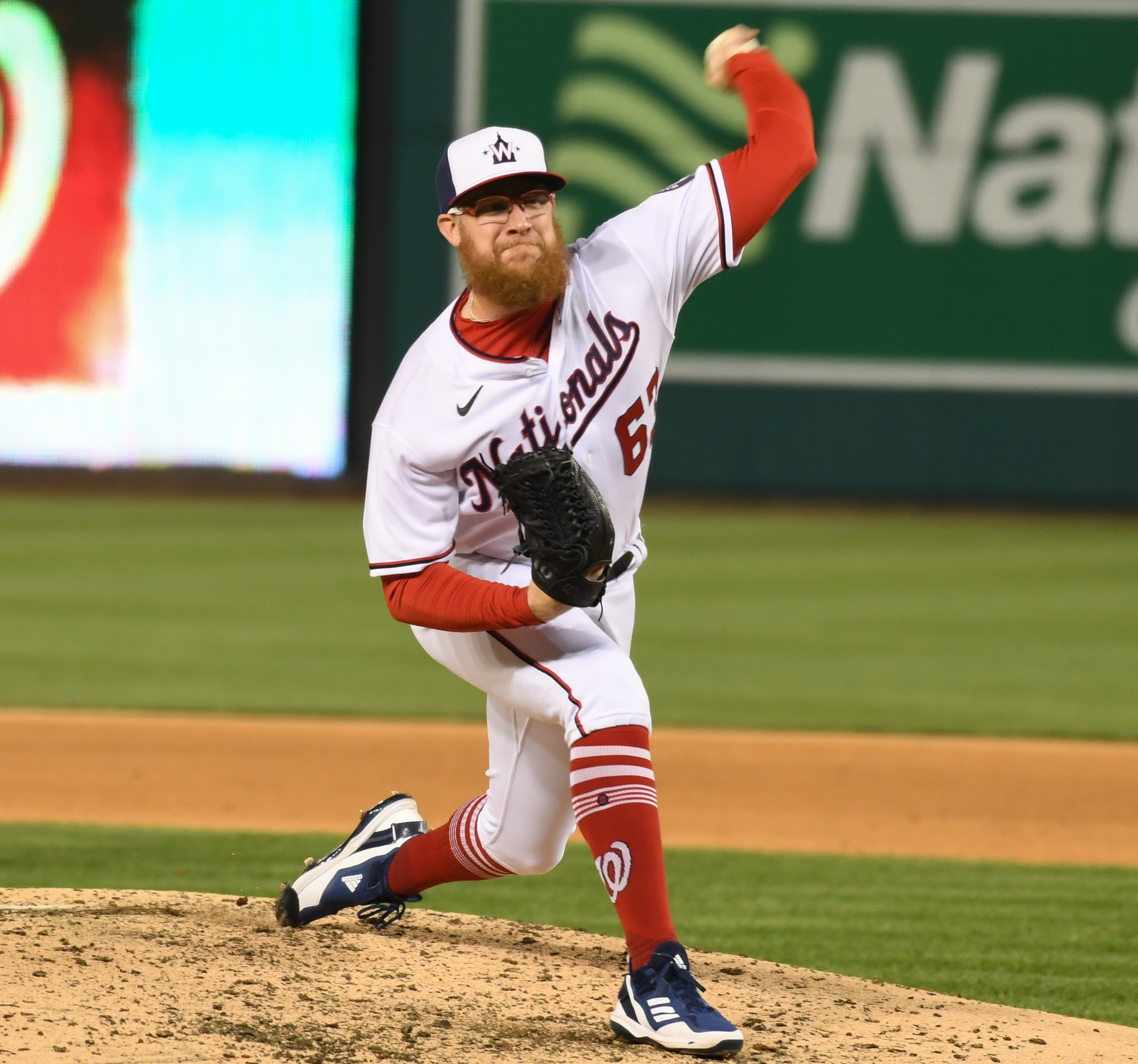
Doolittle pitching against the Mets in 2022

On March 16, 2022, Doolittle signed a one-year, $1.5 million contract with the Washington Nationals. After six scoreless appearances, he was placed on the injured list on April 20 and underwent internal brace surgery on the ulner collateral ligament in his elbow in July, which ended his season.

==== 2023: Injuries and retirement ====
On November 6, 2022, Doolittle re-signed a minor league contract with Washington with an invitation to spring training in 2023. He was not able to fully come back from his elbow surgery and suffered a knee strain in late June, sending him to the injured list for the final time in his career. In 11 minor league games before the knee injury, pitching for the Single-A Fredericksburg Nationals, High-A Wilmington Blue Rocks, Double-A Harrisburg Senators, and Triple-A Rochester Red Wings, Doolittle had a 5.91 ERA. On September 22, Doolittle announced his retirement from professional baseball.

Doolittle had 75 saves with the Nationals, tied for fourth most with the franchise since it relocated from Montreal in 2005. He threw his fastball 87 percent of the time, the second highest frequency of any pitcher during his career, trailing only Jake McGee, and the sixth-most since pitch-type data was tracked starting in 2002.

== Post-playing career ==
On January 16, 2024, Doolittle was hired by the Nationals as a pitching strategist. Although manager Dave Martinez and president of baseball operations Mike Rizzo were fired midway through the Nationals' 2025 season and interim manager Miguel Cairo was not retained after the season, Rizzo's successor, Paul Toboni, kept Doolittle on the coaching staff as an assistant pitching coach.

== Philanthropy and politics ==
Doolittle is active in several charitable efforts. He was nominated for the Roberto Clemente Award in 2016 by the Athletics and in 2020 by the Nationals. He was twice nominated for the Branch Rickey Award by the Athletics.

Regarding his charity work, Doolittle told The New York Times in 2016: "When I was a kid, I remember my parents would say, 'Baseball is what you do, but that's not who you are' — like that might be my job, but that's not the end-all, be-all. I feel like I might even be able to use it to help other people or open some doors or explore more opportunities."

=== Support for veterans ===
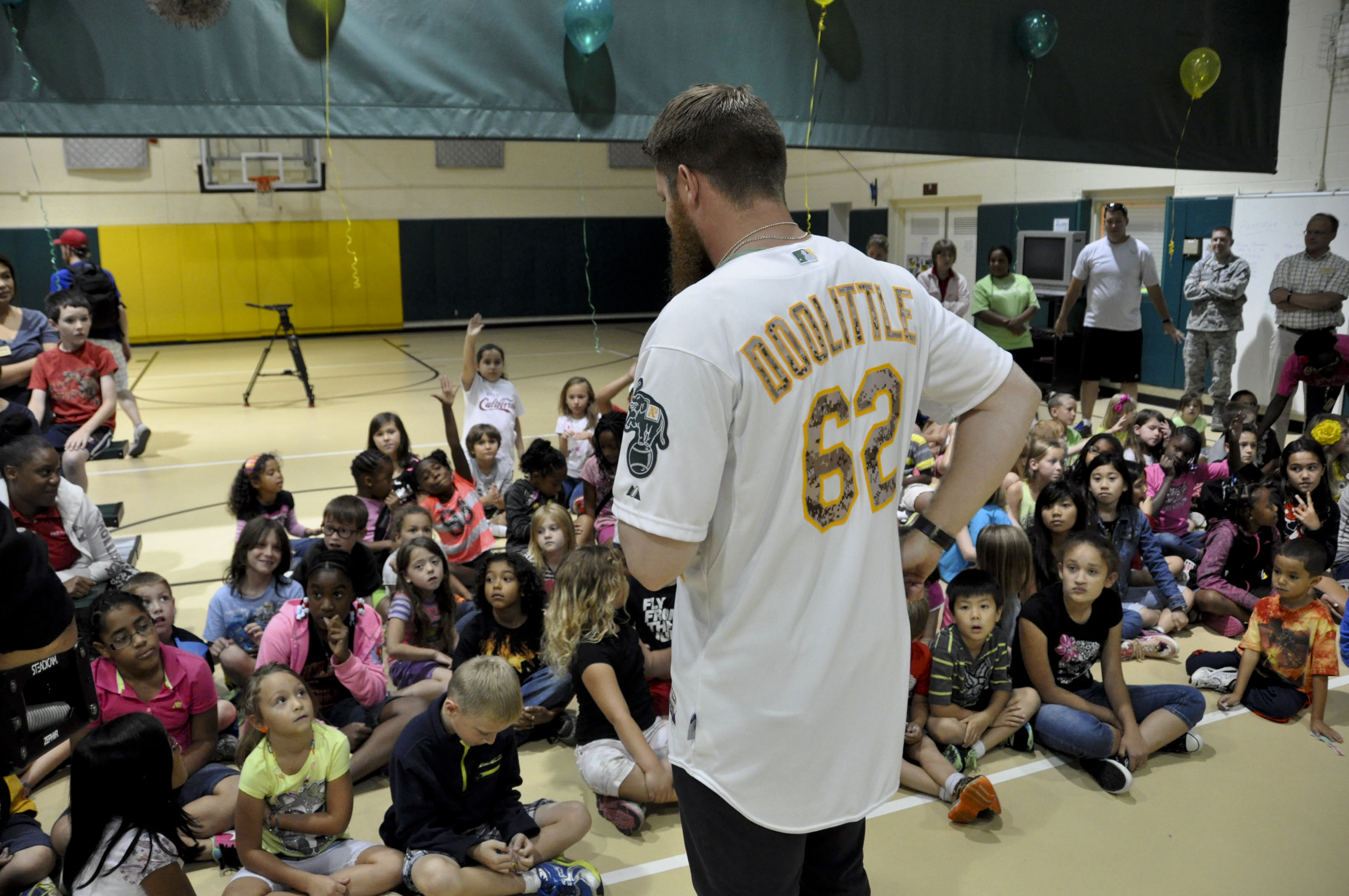
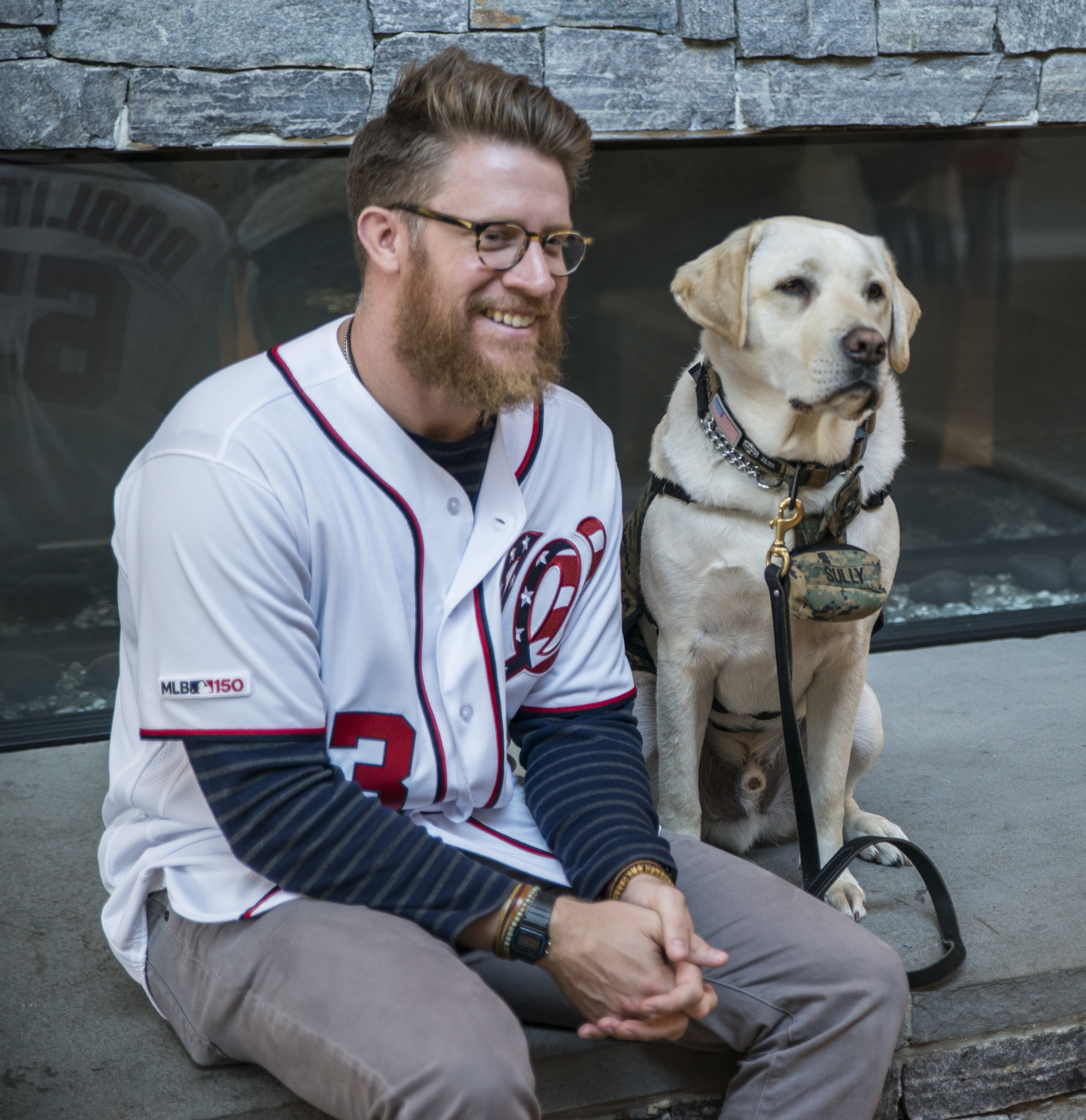
Doolittle (left) speaking to children at Travis Air Force Base in 2014 and (right) with Sully during a visit to Naval Support Activity Bethesda in 2019

Doolittle supports Operation Finally Home, a nonprofit dedicated to providing housing for U.S. military veterans and their families, and Swords to Ploughshares, a Bay Area organization devoted to helping veterans with housing and employment. In recognition of his work with U.S. military veterans, he won the Bob Feller Act of Valor Award in 2018.

=== LGBTQ rights ===
In June 2015, when the Oakland Athletics Pride Night received backlash from some fans for the team's support of LGBTQ rights, Doolittle and then-girlfriend Eireann Dolan bought hundreds of game tickets, which they donated to local LGBTQ groups and raised an additional $40,000 in donations. Doolittle is an ally and LGBTQ rights activist who also supported Pride events with the Nationals.

=== Workers rights ===
Doolittle has supported workers' rights throughout baseball, including the MLB players unions and workers who make baseball hats and work at stadiums.

=== DC statehood ===
Doolittle and Dolan support to the District of Columbia statehood movement. In August 2022, they co-hosted an art exhibit in Washington, D.C. entitled "Art Drives Statehood" to raise awareness of the cause.

=== Politics and other ===
In November 2015, Doolittle and Dolan hosted a Thanksgiving dinner in Chicago for 17 Syrian refugee families.

In October 2016, Doolittle was one of several professional athletes to denounce Republican presidential candidate Donald Trump's comments about non-consensual groping of women as not being "locker room talk". In 2019, the Washington Post reported that, because of then-president Trump's actions, Doolittle would not attend a ceremony at the White House following the Nationals' World Series win.

Doolittle said in 2017 that he registered as a political independent. Doolittle later said he was a member of the Democratic Socialists of America.

Doolittle spoke to youth baseball players as part of MLB's "Shred Hate" anti-bullying campaign.

== Personal life ==
Doolittle and Eireann Dolan married on October 2, 2017, eloping the day after the Nationals' last game of the regular season. They met in Oakland when Dolan was working as a writer for Doolittle's then-teammate Brandon McCarthy.

Sean's younger brother, Ryan, was a pitcher in the Athletics' farm system from 2008 to 2016. The two trained together to rehabilitate from injuries when Doolittle switched from being a position player to a pitcher. They have a sister. Their father served in the U.S. Air Force and received a bronze star.

Doolittle changed his jersey number from 62 to 63 in 2019 to honor his grandmother, Jan Urban, who died that spring. She had been married to his grandfather, John Urban, for 63 years.

Doolittle is a seventh cousin of General Jimmy Doolittle, who led the Doolittle Raid in World War II.

While traveling for away games, Doolittle regularly visited independent bookstores and then shared his visits on social media. An avid reader, particularly of science fiction and fantasy, he told The Wall Street Journal, "I want to support these places that are active in their communities, that are trying to be supportive and inclusive spaces for their communities." In an interview with Librarian of Congress Carla Hayden, Doolittle said that one of his favorite authors is Octavia E. Butler, and, in particular, he is a fan of Parable of the Sower.

Doolittle is a Star Wars fan. He wore Chewbacca pajamas when he first saw Star Wars: The Force Awakens. He also liked Rogue One and Star Wars: the Last Jedi. His fandom was part of his baseball career. He caught a ceremonial first pitch thrown out by Boba Fett at an Athletics game in 2013. The Nationals gave away an "Obi-Sean Kenobi" bobblehead with Doolittle's face on it in 2019. He regularly carried a lightsaber to celebrate Nationals victories in the 2019 postseason.

== Awards and honors ==
- 2018 Bob Feller Act of Valor Award
- MLB All-Star: 2014, 2018
- September 2017 NL Reliever of the Month
- 2008 California League Mid-Season All-Star
- 2008 Arizona Fall League Rising Stars
- 2008 Arizona Fall League All-Prospect Team
