= No pitch =

Type of pitch in baseball

A no pitch is an umpire's ruling in baseball or softball in which a pitch thrown by a pitcher is neither a ball nor a strike. This is typically the umpire's call whenever the pitcher released the ball after the umpire called timeout. However, there are other instances in which this can be called.

== Major League Baseball rules ==
The call is not directly defined in the MLB rulebook. However, it is still mentioned in a comment under Rule 6.02(b):

A ball which slips out of a pitcher's hand and crosses the foul line shall be called a ball; otherwise it will be called no pitch. This would be a balk with men on base.

== Occurrence ==
There are various reasons an umpire would rule a no pitch:

- If any umpire calls time while a pitch is being delivered.
- With nobody on base, the pitcher releases the ball and the ball fails to pass over home plate or a foul line.
- While the pitch is being delivered, the ball is interfered with while in flight.
- If an umpire believes the batter is not ready or if the batter is not in the batter's box, a no pitch may also be called.
- A home plate umpire not in a ready position to call a ball or strike may call a no pitch.

One of the most famous no pitch calls occurred when Arizona Diamondbacks pitcher Randy Johnson hit a bird with a pitch. During a spring training game on March 24, 2001, Johnson's fastball struck and killed a dove that swooped across the infield after Johnson released the pitch. MLB's chief umpire noted that under Rule 8.01(c), umpires can make calls in situations not covered by the rules using "common sense and fair play," and here a no pitch call "was the fairest thing to do."
