= Bob Feller Act of Valor Award =

American award

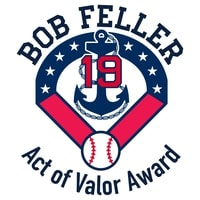
Bob Feller Act of Valor Award Logo

The Bob Feller Act of Valor Award, created in 2013, is a set of awards originally presented annually to a member of the National Baseball Hall of Fame, a current Major League Baseball player, and a United States Navy Chief Petty Officer. In 2015, the Act of Valor Award Foundation added the Jerry Coleman Award to honor a United States Marine Corps Staff Noncommissioned Officer (SNCO), and two more Act of Valor awards for junior sailor peer-to-peer mentoring organizations. The baseball recipients are honored for their support of United States servicemen and women; the military awardees are honored for achievement that represents the character of Bob Feller. The Award is presented by the Bob Feller Act of Valor Award Foundation in conjunction with Major League Baseball, the National Baseball Hall of Fame and Museum, the Cleveland Guardians, and with the support of the United States Navy and Marine Corps.

== Background ==
The award is named for Bob Feller, who put his baseball career on hold and became the first American professional athlete to enlist in the armed forces, volunteering for combat service in the United States Navy the day after the attack on Pearl Harbor. Feller was inducted into the National Baseball Hall of Fame in 1962, his first time on the ballot. When asked, "What is the most important game you ever won?", he would answer "World War II". He took great pride in his time in the military, and never once regretted placing service to his country before himself. "I didn’t worry about losing my baseball career. We needed to win the war. I wanted to do my part." Feller wanted to be remembered as, "An American, who happened to be a ballplayer". Despite losing almost four full seasons to wartime service, Feller had an impressive baseball career and was elected to the Hall of Fame in 1962. He and Jackie Robinson were elected in their first year of eligibility, the first players to be so honored since the inaugural class of 1936. Feller died in 2010.

== History ==
Peter Fertig conceived the award. He wrote letters to the National Baseball Hall of Fame and Museum, Major League Baseball, the Cleveland Indians, and the USS Alabama (BB-60), and said that "within six weeks, I had everybody's support". He garnered support from the business community in Cleveland, as well as Feller's widow Anne Feller. Then he worked with Islip, New York, councilman John Cochrane in drafting a proposal. Rear Admiral Michael Jabaley of the United States Navy helped mentor Peter with gaining official support from the United States Navy. It became an official Navy award on Memorial Day, 2013.

In 2013, its inaugural year, three awards were given to represent Bob Feller's life as an MLB player, a U.S. Navy Chief Petty Officer, and a National Baseball Hall of Famer. The award also recognized 37 Hall of Fame players, owners, umpires, and broadcasters that served during World War II. Three MLB finalists were named by the award's board of directors, three Navy Chief Petty Officer finalists were selected by the U.S. Navy, and the board of directors selected the Hall of Famer. The announcement of the award took place at the Hall of Fame ceremony on May 25, followed by a presentation to the finalists on July 6, and a selection of the winners on Veterans Day. The awards were presented at the United States Navy Memorial in Washington, D.C.

=== Jerry Coleman Award ===
On July 28, 2015, the Bob Feller Act of Valor Award Foundation announced that it would present the Jerry Coleman Award to honor a Marine Staff Noncommissioned Officer (SNCO) who "possesses outstanding leadership and unyielding support for the United States Marine Corps and the United States of America". As the 75th Secretary of the Navy, the honorable Ray Mabus made the recommendation for the award to the board of directors, explaining that as Secretary of the Navy, he is responsible for the entire Naval community which includes the United States Marine Corps. The award is named after Jerry Coleman, awarded MLB Rookie of the Year (1949), All-Star (1950), and World Series MVP (1950), all with the New York Yankees. Coleman was also a longtime broadcaster for the San Diego Padres and was honored with the Ford C. Frick Award, presented by the National Baseball Hall of Fame. Coleman served in the United States Marine Corps in World War II and Korea.

=== Peer-to-peer mentoring awards ===
Beginning in 2015, along with the Bob Feller and Jerry Coleman Awards, the Foundation added two peer-to-peer mentoring awards, one for afloat and one for ashore organizations. The awards "honor groups of junior Sailors that have excelled in encouraging other Sailors to embody the Navy's core values of honor, courage, and commitment, and have worked together to promote peer-to-peer mentorship and reduce destructive personal decision-making and behaviors". The Sailors range from ages 18 to 25 years old.

== Award recipients ==
Year	National Baseball Hall of Fame Player	MLB Player	United States Navy Chief Petty Officer Award	United States Marine Corps Jerry Coleman Award	Peer to Peer Award (Afloat)	Peer to Peer Award (Ashore)	Fellowship Award	Patriot Award	Honorable John H. Dalton Morale, Welfare, Recreation Award	Volunteer Award	Refs.
2013	Yogi Berra	Justin Verlander	Chief Petty Officer Garth Sinclair	–	–	–					
2014	Tommy Lasorda	Nick Swisher	Chief Petty Officer Carl Thompson	–	–	–					
2015	George Brett	Jonathan Lucroy	Chief Petty Officer Genell Cody	Staff Sergeant Rene Segura	USS Carl Vinson (CVN-70)	Hopper Information Services Center					
2016	Rod Carew	Brad Ziegler	Chief Petty Officer Christopher Beeding	Gunnery Sergeant Marshall Cleveland	USS Constitution	Training Support Center Great Lakes Chapter of the Coalition of Sailors Against Destructive Decisions (CSADD)					
2017	Tom Seaver	Darren O'Day	Chief Petty Officer Edmundo Brantes	Staff Sergeant Adam Plambeck	Unmanned Patrol Squadron One Nine (VUP-19)	Training Support Center Great Lakes Chapter of the Coalition of Sailors Against Destructive Decisions (CSADD)					
2018	Johnny Bench	Sean Doolittle	Chief Petty Officer Shawn M. Wingle	Gunnery Sergeant Johnathan S. Rose	Naval Mobile Construction Battalion 5 in Port Hueneme, CA	Training Support Center Great Lakes Chapter of the Coalition of Sailors Against Destructive Decisions (CSADD)					
2019	Randy Johnson	Ian Kennedy	Chief Petty Officer Jairo N. Guity	Gunnery Sergeant Joshua A. MacMillan	USS America (LHA-6) Junior Enlisted Association (JEA)	Training Support Center Great Lakes Chapter of the Coalition of Sailors Against Destructive Decisions (CSADD)	Nathaniel Cameron (Ohio University)				
2020	Brooks Robinson	Craig Stammen	Chief Petty Officer Lacresha L. Dowdell	Master Sergeant Herman A. Kruppa	USS America (LHA-6) Junior Enlisted Association (JEA)	Training Support Center Great Lakes Chapter of the Coalition of Sailors Against Destructive Decisions (CSADD)	Tyler Buchholz (James Madison University)				
2021	Joe Torre	Griffin Jax	Chief Petty Officer Joshua A. Sawyer	First Sergeant Daniel P. Best	USS Germantown (LSD-42) Junior Enlisted Association (JEA)	Training Support Center Great Lakes Chapter of the Coalition of Sailors Against Destructive Decisions (CSADD)	Galen Odell (Emerson College)				
2022	Trevor Hoffman	Byron Buxton	Chief Petty Officer Kendall D. Burnett	Gunnery Sergeant Joseph S. White	USS Constitution Coalition of Sailors Against Destructive Decisions (CSADD)	Portsmouth Naval Shipyard Coalition of Sailors Against Destructive Decisions (CSADD)	Blake Schmida (University of Nebraska–Lincoln)				
2023	Carlton Fisk	Jon Gray	Chief Personnel Specialist Terrell M. Cutler	Gunnery Sergeant Terrance B. Showers	USS Tripoli (LHA-7) Junior Enlisted Association (JEA)	-	Nora Belodeau (Gettysburg College) Marco Del Bene (Pace University)				
2024	Pedro Martínez	Sean Reid-Foley	Chief Petty Officer Roberto P. Landeros III	Gunnery Sergeant Austin J. Otto	PCU JFK CSADD	NIOC Colorado	Casey Coffman (Texas State University)	Al Bumbry			
2025	Rollie Fingers	Mike Yastrzemski	Chief Petty Officer Ollie E. Dunlap IV	Gunnery Sergeant Paul A. Luna	USS Decatur (DDG-73)	-	Caitlin Omey (Fordham University)	Rick Monday			
2026	Wade Boggs	Zach Neto	Chief Petty Officer Shane D. Gubbs, USN	Gunnery Sergeant Brandon W. Unger, USMC	-	-	-	Mitch Harris	Guam Aircrew Association	Kate Gironda	

== World War II Hall of Fame Members ==
Name	Team	Branch
Al Barlick	Umpire	United States Coast Guard
Bill Dickey	New York Yankees	United States Navy
Bill Veeck	Executive	United States Marine Corps
Billy Herman	Brooklyn Dodgers	United States Navy
Bobby Doerr	Boston Red Sox	United States Army
Bob Feller	Cleveland Indians	United States Navy
Bob Lemon	Cleveland Indians	United States Navy
Buck O'Neil	Kansas City Monarchs	United States Navy
Charlie Gehringer	Detroit Tigers	United States Navy
Duke Snider	Brooklyn Dodgers	United States Navy
Early Wynn	Washington Senators	United States Army
Enos Slaughter	St. Louis Cardinals	United States Army Air Force
Gil Hodges	Brooklyn Dodgers	United States Marine Corps
Hank Greenberg	Detroit Tigers	United States Army Air Force
Hoyt Wilhelm	New York Giants	United States Army
Jackie Robinson	Brooklyn Dodgers	United States Army
Joe DiMaggio	New York Yankees	United States Army Air Force
Joe Gordon	New York Yankees	United States Army Air Force
Johnny Mize	New York Giants	United States Navy
Larry Doby	Cleveland Indians	United States Navy
Larry MacPhail	Executive	United States Army
Lee MacPhail	Executive	United States Navy
Leon Day	Newark Eagles	United States Army
Luke Appling	Chicago White Sox	United States Army
Mickey Cochrane	Philadelphia Athletics	United States Navy
Monte Irvin	New York Giants	United States Army
Nestor Chylak	Umpire	United States Army
Pee Wee Reese	Brooklyn Dodgers	United States Navy
Phil Rizzuto	New York Yankees	United States Navy
Ralph Kiner	Pittsburgh Pirates	United States Navy
Red Ruffing	New York Yankees	United States Army Air Force
Red Schoendienst	St. Louis Cardinals	United States Army
Robin Roberts	Philadelphia Phillies	United States Army Air Force
Stan Musial	St. Louis Cardinals	United States Navy
Ted Lyons	Chicago White Sox	United States Marine Corps
Ted Williams	Boston Red Sox	United States Marine Corps
Warren Spahn	Milwaukee Braves	United States Army
Willard Brown	Kansas City Monarchs	United States Army
Yogi Berra	New York Yankees	United States Navy

== Gallery ==
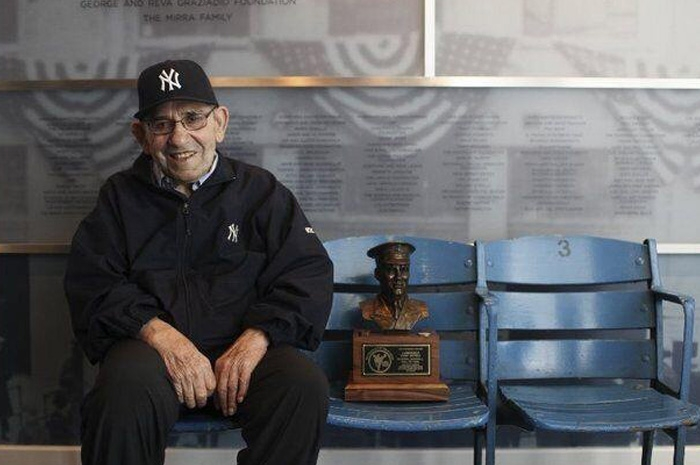
Yogi Berra with Bob Feller Act of Valor 2013 Award

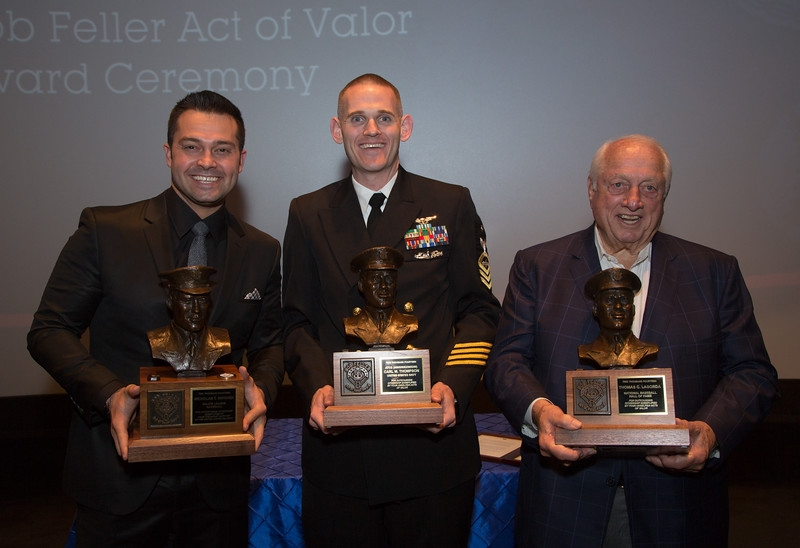
Bob Feller Act of Valor 2014 Award Recipients

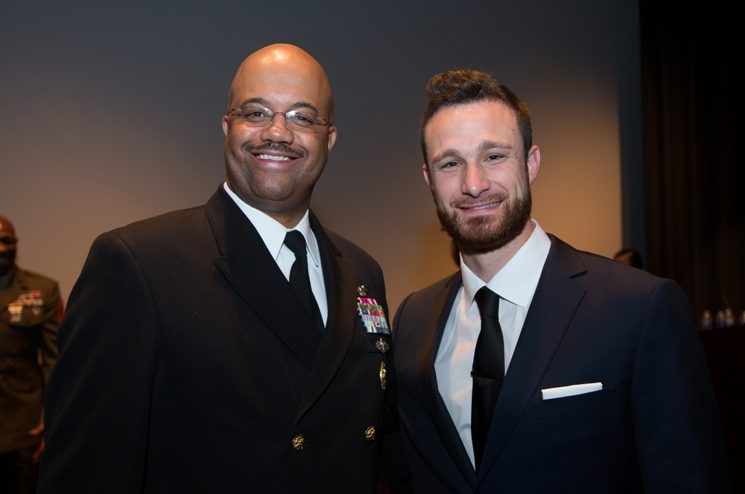
Jonathan Lucroy at the Bob Feller Act of Valor Award Ceremony 2015

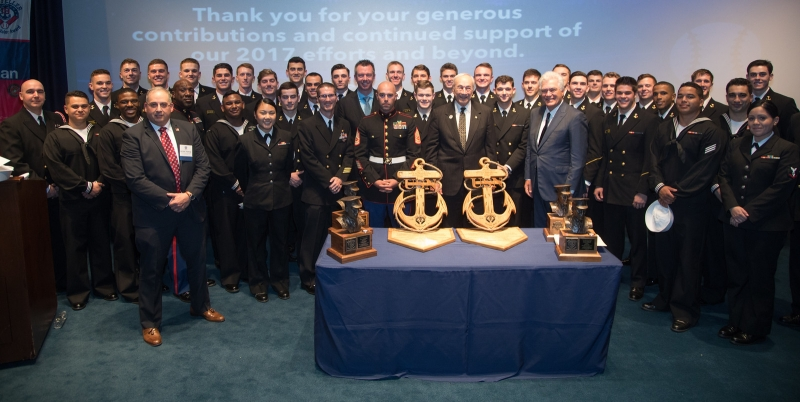
2016 Recipients at the Bob Feller Act of Valor Award Ceremony

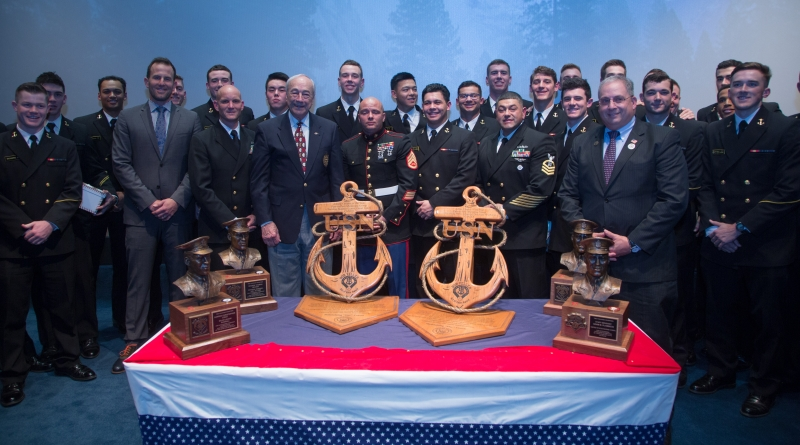
2017 Recipients at the Bob Feller Act of Valor Award Ceremony

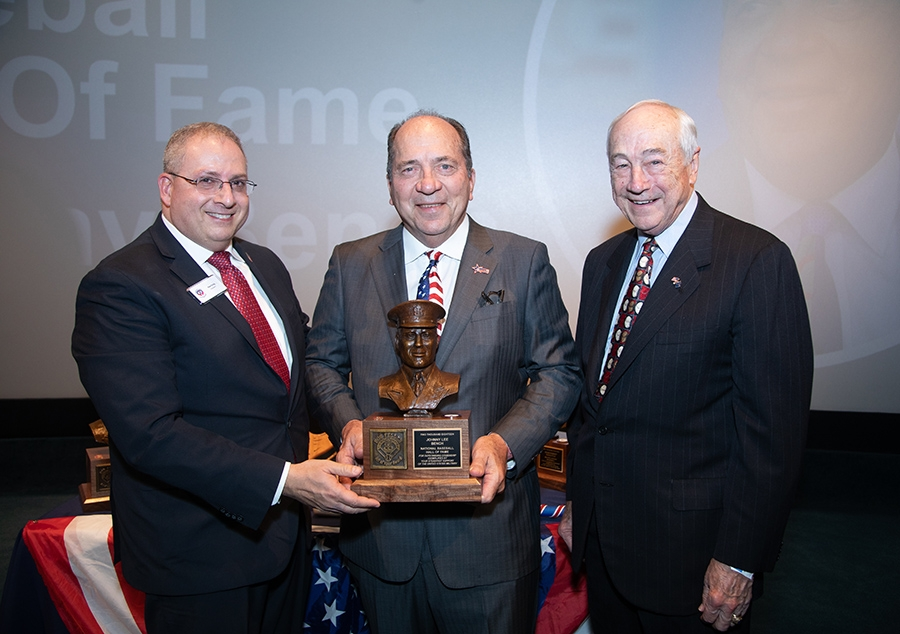
Johnny Bench at the Bob Feller Act of Valor Award Ceremony 2018

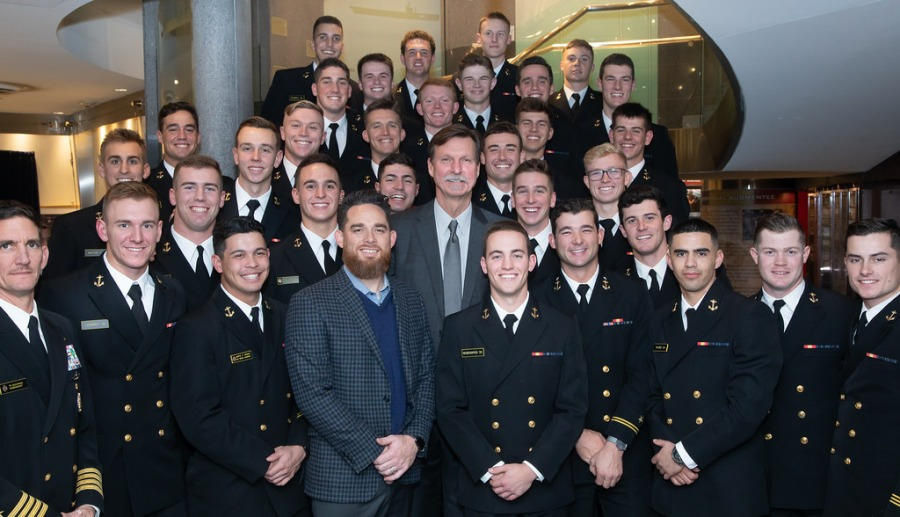
Randy Johnson and Ian Kennedy at the 2019 Bob Feller Act of Valor Award Ceremony

== See also ==
- Roberto Clemente Award
- Lou Gehrig Memorial Award
- Marvin Miller Man of the Year Award
- Branch Rickey Award
- Jackie Robinson Award
