= Robby Hammock =

American baseball player & coach (born 1977)

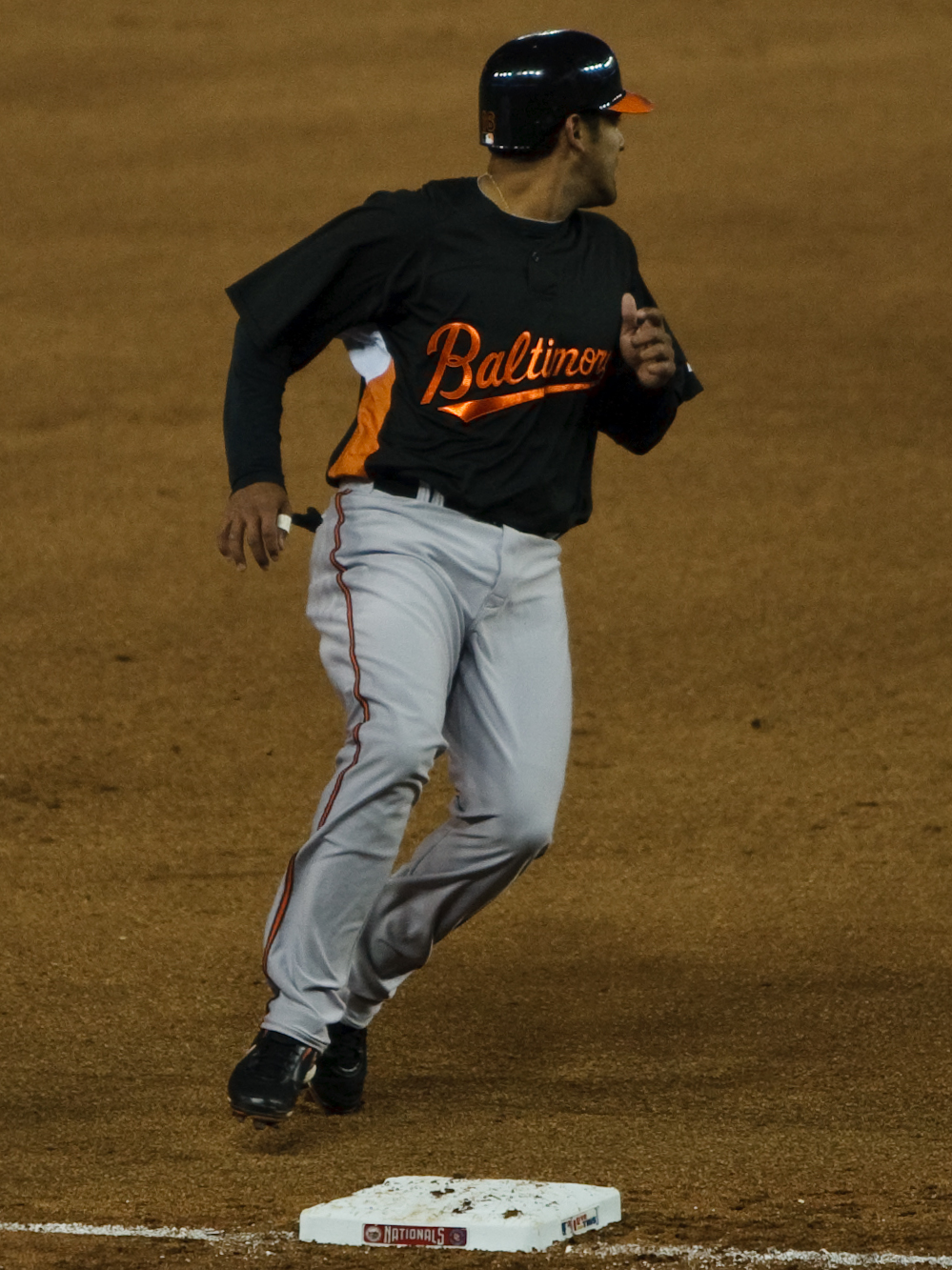
- Hammock with the Baltimore Orioles in 2009
- Catcher / Manager / Coach
- Born: May 13, 1977 (age 49); Macon, Georgia, U.S.
- Batted: Right Threw: Right

MLB debut
- April 11, 2003, for the Arizona Diamondbacks

Last MLB appearance
- September 28, 2011, for the Arizona Diamondbacks

MLB statistics
- Batting average: .254
- Home runs: 12
- Runs batted in: 48
- Stats at Baseball Reference

Teams
- As player: Arizona Diamondbacks (2003–2004, 2006–2008, 2011); As coach: Arizona Diamondbacks (2017–2021); San Diego Padres (2025)

Robert Wade Hammock (born May 13, 1977) is an American former professional baseball catcher and current coach. He played in MLB for the Arizona Diamondbacks. Hammock was the catcher for Randy Johnson's perfect game on May 18, 2004.

== Playing career ==
Hammock played baseball at South Cobb High School, and later for DeKalb College and the Georgia Bulldogs.

Hammock was drafted three times: in 1995 by the Florida Marlins, in 1997 by the Tampa Bay Devil Rays, and in 1998 by the Arizona Diamondbacks. He played five seasons at various minor league levels from 1998 to 2002. In 2003, he played in 65 games for the major league club, batting .282 and starting 28 games at catcher. His numbers were good enough to earn him a place on the 2003 Topps All-Star Rookie Roster. Hammock was the third catcher behind Chad Moeller and Rod Barajas for Arizona in 2003.

Along with Matt Kata, Alex Cintrón, Brandon Webb, and others, he was one of the "Baby Backs" who were called up when a surge of injuries hit Diamondbacks veteran players in 2003. The Baby Backs were popular and contributed to a winning season, but ultimately failed to make the playoffs.

In 2004, Hammock made two brief minor league stops before rejoining the Diamondbacks. He played in 62 games, starting 46 at catcher and hit .241 with 16 doubles that season. On May 18, 2004, he caught Randy Johnson's perfect game.

Hammock did not appear in a major league game in 2005, and only played in three games for the Triple-A Tucson Sidewinders. He was on the roster for the 2006 Sidewinders, in which he played multiple positions. He was called up after the Sidewinders won the Pacific Coast League Championship game, and appeared in only one game.

Hammock was non-tendered following the 2008 season, and became a free agent. On January 12, 2009, he signed a minor league contract with an invitation to spring training with the Baltimore Orioles.

On February 1, 2010, Hammock signed a minor league contract with the Colorado Rockies. On April 3, 2010, Hammock was traded to the New York Yankees for a player to be named later. Hammock signed a minor league contract with the Diamondbacks for the 2011 season. He spent most of the year with the Reno Aces, observing manager Brett Butler.

== Coaching career ==
=== Arizona Diamondbacks ===
Hammock began his coaching career in the D-Backs' minor-league system as hitting coach of the Arizona League Diamondbacks in 2012, then in 2013 was manager of the Missoula Osprey. The following year, he managed the Visalia Rawhide. In 2015 and 2016, Hammock managed the Mobile BayBears.

In November 2016, Hammock was named as quality control/catching coach for the Diamondbacks. He retained the role for the 2018 through 2021 seasons.

In October 2018, Hammock was named the manager of the Tigres del Licey of the Dominican Winter League.

=== San Diego Padres ===
In 2022, Hammock was the hitting coach for the El Paso Chihuahuas, Triple-A affiliate for the San Diego Padres.

=== Pittsburgh Pirates ===
Hammock was the manager of the 2023 Greensboro Grasshoppers, High-A affiliate for the Pittsburgh Pirates.

Starting in 2024, Hammock was named the manager of the Altoona Curve.

=== San Diego Padres (second stint) ===
On January 9, 2025, it was announced that Hammock would be joining the major league coaching staff of the San Diego Padres. He did not return to the staff following the 2025 season.
