= List of Atlanta Braves team records =

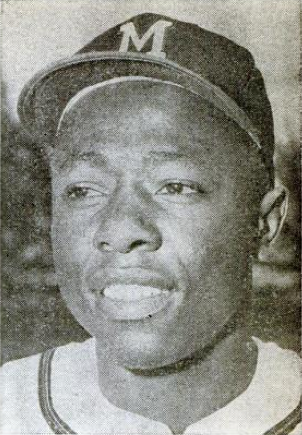
Hank Aaron, the holder of ten franchise records for the Braves

The Atlanta Braves are a Major League Baseball (MLB) franchise based in Atlanta. The Braves formed in 1871 as the Boston Red Stockings. After moving in 1953 to Milwaukee for 12 years and a World Series Championship in '57, the Braves relocated to Atlanta in 1966. Through 2010, the Braves have played 20,053 games, winning 9,945, losing 9,954, and tying 154, for a winning percentage of approximately .500. This list documents the superlative records and accomplishments of team members during their tenures in MLB.

Hank Aaron holds the most franchise records as of the end of the 2010 season, with ten, including most career hits, doubles, and the best career on-base plus slugging percentage. Aaron also held the career home runs record from April 8, 1974 until August 8, 2007. He is followed by Hugh Duffy, who holds eight records, including best single-season batting average and the best single-season slugging percentage record.

Four Braves players currently hold Major League Baseball records. Duffy holds the best single-season batting average record, accumulating an average of .440 in 1894. Bobby Lowe and Bob Horner are tied with 16 others for the most home runs in a game, with four, which they recorded on May 30, 1890, and July 6, 1986, respectively. Red Barrett, a Brave for six years, holds the record for fewest pitches by a single pitcher in a complete game, with 58, which he achieved on August 10, 1944.

On September 9, 2020, the Braves scored a franchise record 29 runs in a game against the Miami Marlins at Truist Park. In the second inning, there were 11 runs scored. Adam Duval hit three home runs, including a grand slam in the seventh inning. On September 22, 2020, the Braves won their third division title in a row, making the franchise record a league-leading 20 Eastern Division titles.

In the Wildcard Playoff series against the Cincinnati Reds during the 2020 postseason, the Braves and Reds played thirteen innings until Freddie Freeman singled in the winning run for the Braves. During the series, the Braves set another record against the Reds. Braves pitchers held the Reds scoreless through all 22 innings of their National League Wild Card Series victory, meaning Cincinnati surpassed the 1921 Giants (20 innings) for the most consecutive scoreless innings to begin a postseason series. The Braves are also the first team to win a multi-game postseason series (excluding the Wild Card Game) without surrendering a run. The Yankees previously held the low mark after allowing just one total run to the Rangers in back-to-back three-game sweeps of the 1998 and ’99 ALDS.

== Table key ==
Table key
RBI	Run(s) batted in
ERA	Earned run average
OPS	On-base percentage plus slugging percentage
*	Tie between two or more players/teams
§	Major League record
†	Hall of Fame Player

== Individual career records ==
Batting statistics; pitching statistics

Herman Long, the career steals leader for the Braves

Career batting records
Statistic	Player	Record	Braves career	Ref
Batting average	Billy Hamilton	.339	1896–1901	
On-base percentage	Billy Hamilton	.456	1896–1901	
Slugging percentage	Hank Aaron	.567	1954–1974	
OPS	Hank Aaron	.944	1954–1974	
Hits	Hank Aaron	3,600	1954–1974	
Total bases	Hank Aaron	6,591	1954–1974	
Singles	Hank Aaron	2,171	1954–1974	
Doubles	Hank Aaron	600	1954–1974	
Triples	Rabbit Maranville	103	1912–1920; 1929–1933, 1935	
Home runs	Hank Aaron	733	1954–1974	
RBI	Hank Aaron	2,202	1954–1974	
Bases on balls	Chipper Jones	1,512	1993–2012	
Strikeouts	Dale Murphy	1,581	1976–1990	
Stolen bases	Herman Long	434	1890–1902	

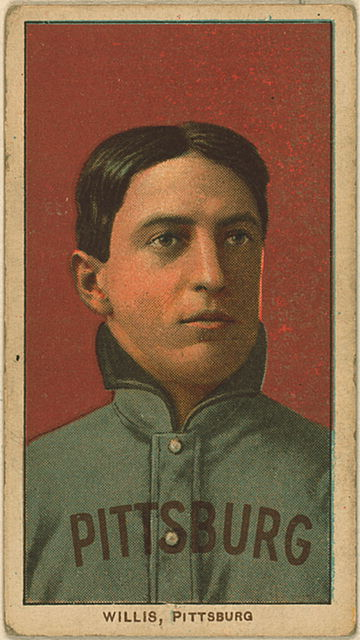
Vic Willis holds the Braves career record for most hit batsmen.

Career pitching records
Statistic	Player	Record	Braves career	Ref
Wins	Warren Spahn	356	1942, 1946–1964	
Losses	Phil Niekro	230	1964–1983, 1987	
Win–loss percentage	Russ Ortiz	.692	2003–2004	
ERA	Tommy Bond	2.21	1887–1881	
Saves	Craig Kimbrel	186	2010–2014	
Strikeouts	John Smoltz	3,011	1988–1999; 2001–2008	
Shutouts	Warren Spahn	63	1942, 1946–1964	
Games	Phil Niekro	740	1964–1983, 1987	
Innings	Warren Spahn	5,046.0	1942, 1946–1964	
Games started	Warren Spahn	635	1942, 1946–1964	
Complete games	Kid Nichols	476	1890–1901	
Walks	Phil Niekro	1,458	1964–1983, 1987	
Hits allowed	Warren Spahn	4,620	1942, 1946–1964	
Wild pitches	Phil Niekro	200	1964–1983, 1987	
Hit batsmen	Vic Willis	133	1898–1905	

== Individual single-season records ==
Batting statistics; pitching statistics

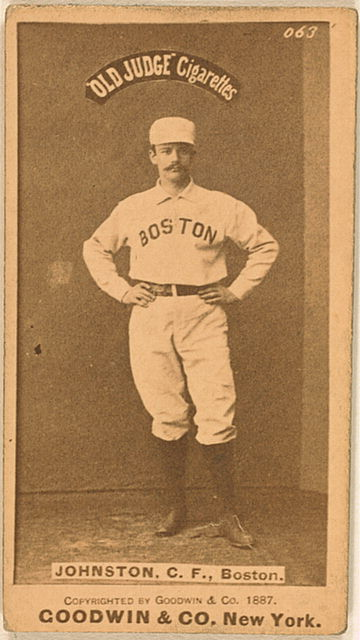
Dick Johnston, the co-holder of the Braves single-season triples record

Single-season batting records
Statistic	Player	Record	Season	Ref(s)
Batting average	Hugh Duffy	.440^{§}	1894	
Home runs	Matt Olson	54	2023	
RBI	Hugh Duffy	145	1894	
Runs	Hugh Duffy	160	1894	
Hits	Hugh Duffy	237	1894	
Singles	Ralph Garr	180	1971	
Doubles	Hugh Duffy	51	1894	
Triples	Dick Johnston	20*	1887	
Triples	Harry Stovey	20*	1891	
Stolen bases	King Kelly	84	1887	
At bats	Marquis Grissom	671	1996	
Slugging percentage	Hugh Duffy	.694	1894	
Extra-base hits	Hank Aaron	92	1959	
Total bases	Hank Aaron	400	1959	
On-base percentage	Hugh Duffy	.502	1894	
OPS	Hugh Duffy	1.196	1894	
Walks	Bob Elliott	131	1948	
Strikeouts	Ronald Acuña Jr.	188	2019	

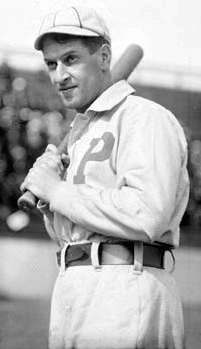
Kid Nichols (pictured) is tied with Charles Radbourn for the most earned runs allowed in a single season.

Single-season pitching records
Statistic	Player	Record	Season	Ref(s)
Wins	John Clarkson	49	1889	
Losses	Jim Whitney	33	1881	
Strikeouts	Charlie Buffinton	417	1884	
ERA	Greg Maddux	1.56	1994	
Earned runs allowed	Charles Radbourn	215*	1887	
Earned runs allowed	Kid Nichols	215*	1894	
Hits allowed	John Clarkson	589	1889	
Shutouts	Tommy Bond	11	1879	
Saves	John Smoltz	55	2002	
Games	Peter Moylan	87	2009	
Starts	John Clarkson	72	1889	
Complete games	John Clarkson	68	1889	
Innings	John Clarkson	620.0	1889	

== Individual single-game records ==
Source: Fewest pitches by a single pitcher in a complete game source:

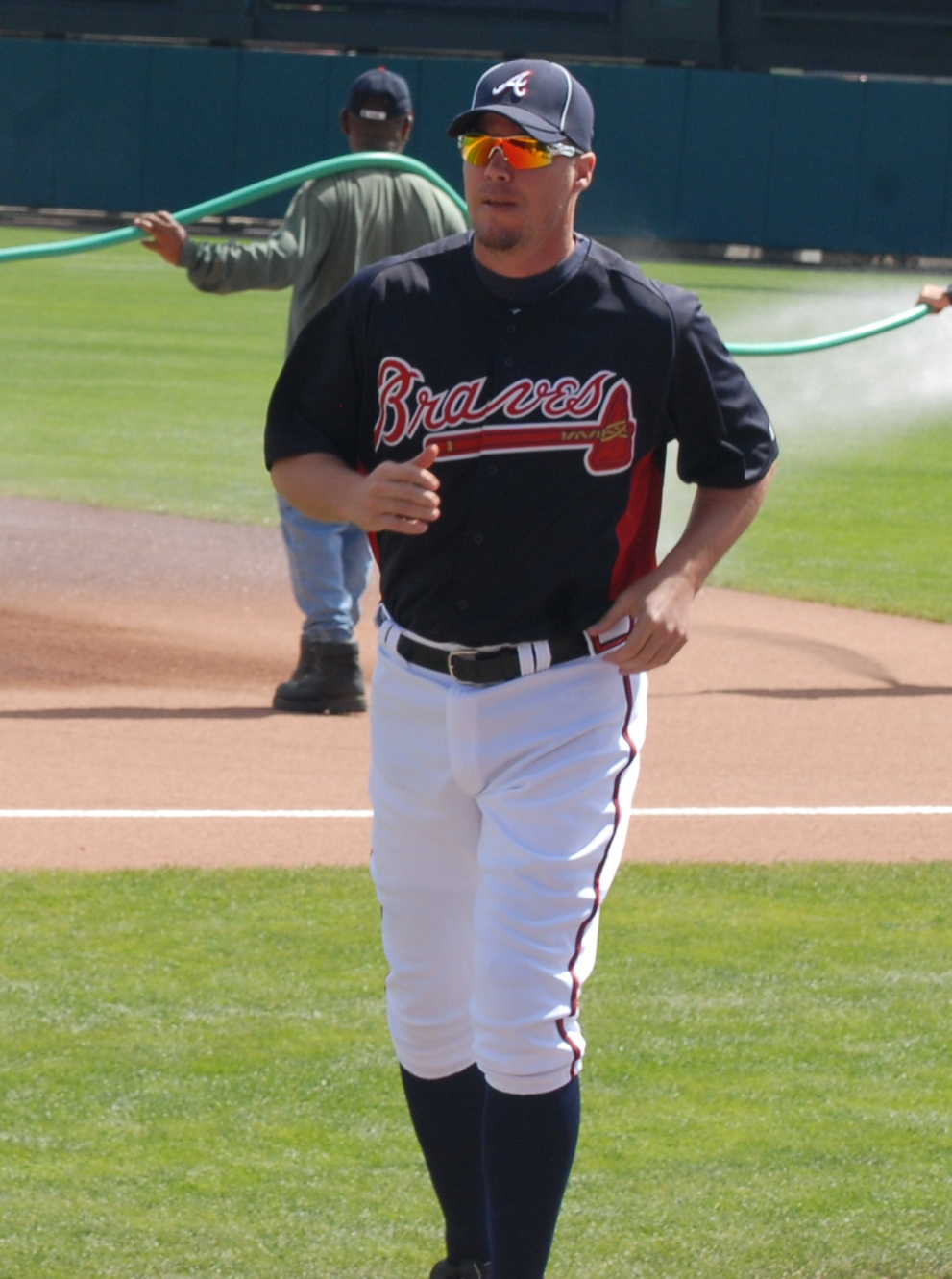
Chipper Jones, the holder of the single-game run record for the Braves

Single-game batting records
Statistic	Player	Record	Date
Hits	Félix Millán	6	July 6, 1970
RBI	Tony Cloninger	9	July 3, 1966
Walks	Dale Murphy	5*	April 22, 1983
Walks	Dale Murphy	5*	May 23, 1987
Home runs	Bobby Lowe	4^{§}^{[b]}	May 30, 1894
Home runs	Bob Horner	4^{§}^{[b]}	July 6, 1986
Runs	Chipper Jones	5*	August 30, 1997
Runs	Chipper Jones	5*	July 3, 2001
Stolen bases	Otis Nixon	6	June 16, 1992

Single-game pitching records
Statistic	Player	Record	Date
Fewest pitches by a single pitcher in a complete game	Red Barrett	58^{§}	August 10, 1944
Wild pitches	Phil Niekro	6	August 4, 1979
Strikeouts	Spencer Strider	16*	September 1, 2022

== Team season records ==
Team season batting records
Statistic	Record	Season
Home runs	307	2023
RBI	916	2023
Runs	947	2023
Hits	1,608	2003
Batting average	.284	2003
Walks	641	1987
Extra base hits	587	2003
Most runners left on base	1,230	2004
Strikeouts	1,289	2023
Stolen bases	165	1991

Team season pitching records
Statistic	Record	Season
Lowest ERA	2.92	1968
Highest ERA	4.85	1977
Strikeouts	1,516	2023
Shutouts	24	1992
Wild pitches	83	1966

== Team all-time records ==
Team all-time records
Statistic	Record
Home runs	14,539
Runs	97,850
Hits	194,996
Batting average	.260
ERA	3.67
Runs allowed	96,606

== Notes ==
- ^{b} Lowe and Horner are two of 18 players in MLB history to hit four home runs in one game.

== See also ==
- Baseball statistics
- Atlanta Braves award winners and league leaders
