= Me and the Spitter =

Autobiography by Gaylord Perry

- Author: Gaylord Perry with Bob Sudyk
- Language: English
- Subject: Baseball
- Genre: Autobiography
- Publisher: Saturday Review Press
- Publication date: 1974
- Publication place: United States
- Media type: Print (Hardcover)
- Pages: 222 (1st ed.)
- ISBN: 0-841-50299-4

Me and the Spitter: An Autobiographical Confession is a 1974 autobiography by Major League Baseball (MLB) pitcher Gaylord Perry, written with Bob Sudyk, a sportswriter for the Cleveland Press. The book details how Perry cheated at baseball by doctoring the ball.

The book covers Perry's early life in rural North Carolina and his early MLB career. After struggling to stay in the majors, Perry learned to throw a spitball, an illegal pitch using various substances such as saliva and Vaseline. Despite admitting to throwing a spitball, Perry was ejected from a game for doctoring the baseball only one time, in 1982, and he was elected to the National Baseball Hall of Fame in 1991.

== Background ==
By the 1973 Major League Baseball (MLB) season, Gaylord Perry, a pitcher for the Cleveland Indians, was widely suspected of throwing a spitball, an illegal pitch where the pitcher applies a foreign substance to the ball to change how it moves; the practice had been banned by MLB in 1920. The pitch is difficult to hit because it maintains the speed of a fastball, until the ball drops suddenly as it reaches the batter.

After the 1971 season, the San Francisco Giants of the National League traded Perry to Cleveland in the American League, leading to new players and managers experiencing Perry's pitching and insisting that he was cheating. Perry won 24 games in the 1972 season and won the Cy Young Award. In 1973, Bobby Murcer of the New York Yankees publicly criticized Bowie Kuhn, the Commissioner of Baseball, and Joe Cronin, the president of the American League, for lacking the "guts" to enforce Rule 8.02, which banned the spitball; in response, Kuhn fined Murcer $250 (equivalent to $1,813 today). After losing a game to Perry, Billy Martin, the manager of the Detroit Tigers, told reporters that he instructed his pitchers to throw a spitball, leading to Cronin suspending Martin for three games. Publicly, Perry insisted that the pitch was a "hard slider".

Gaylord Perry in 1977

That season, Perry approached Bob Sudyk, sportswriter for the Cleveland Press, about co-authoring an autobiography. Sudyk said that Perry would have to be willing to discuss the rumors that he threw a spitball, and Perry agreed. Phil Seghi, the general manager of the Indians, tried to dissuade Perry from sharing his secrets, but was unsuccessful. Perry showed Sudyk how he threw spitballs with substances like Vaseline and K-Y Jelly, and a "puffball" using rosin dust. Perry also showed Sudyk how he hid additives on his uniform and body. Sudyk also traveled to Perry's home in North Carolina.

== Synopsis ==
In the book, Perry talks about beginning his MLB career as the "11th man on an 11‐man pitching staff" for San Francisco. He learned how to throw a spitball from Bob Shaw, a teammate of Perry's with the Giants, as well as how to hide that he was throwing it from the umpires and opposing team. Perry discussed using the pitch in a game for the first time on May 31, 1964, against the New York Mets, during extra innings of the second game of a doubleheader. He pitched ten innings without allowing a run, and entered the Giants' starting rotation soon after.

Perry would chew slippery elm bark to build up his saliva. He wrote that he stopped throwing the spitball in 1968, when MLB changed the rules that had previously permitted a pitcher to touch his fingers to his mouth before touching the baseball. However, he turned to other substances that he could put on the ball, such as Vaseline and K-Y Jelly. Perry publicly stated that he began to throw a forkball. While he was pitching, Perry employed decoy maneuvers, touching different parts of his uniform and person, to give himself a psychological edge over the hitters.

The book also discusses Perry's early life in rural North Carolina, as he and his older brother, Jim, grew up in a farmhouse that did not have electricity until he was 13 years old or indoor plumbing when he was 15 years old.

== Release and reception ==
An excerpt of the book was released in the September 1973 issue of Sport. Perry conducted interviews during off days of the 1973 season to promote the book. A promotional segment on The Today Show on NBC was cancelled because a producer did not want to promote cheating. The book was released in 1974.

Kuhn said that he enjoyed the book. Before the 1974 season, MLB added to Rule 8.02; now nicknamed "Gaylord's Rule", it allowed umpires to call an automatic ball if they suspected a spitball, and eject the pitcher on the second offense. In response to Perry's claim that he stopped throwing a spitball, Dave Anderson of The New York Times wrote: "It's not the first autobiography with some fiction in it."

Perry gained a psychological edge over the hitters due to the spitball, saying "Just the idea that batters think I'm throwing the spitter when I might not be helps me. Some of 'em worry more about whether I'm throwing it than about hitting it." In 1974, Mel Durslag wrote that Perry had "psyched out more hitters than any spitball suspect to come along since Lew Burdette". Perry won the Cy Young Award with Cleveland in 1972 and with the San Diego Padres in 1978. He joined the 300 win club on May 6, 1982, and was ejected from a game for doctoring a baseball for the first and only time of his career on August 23, 1982.

Perry was eventually elected to the National Baseball Hall of Fame in 1991, after failing to get in his first two times, likely due to his alleged use of the spitter.
