= 3,000 strikeout club =

Group of MLB pitchers who have recorded 3,000 strikeouts in their careers

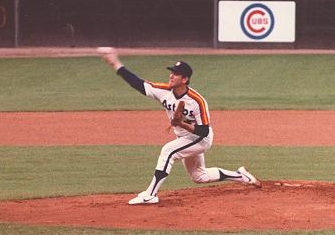
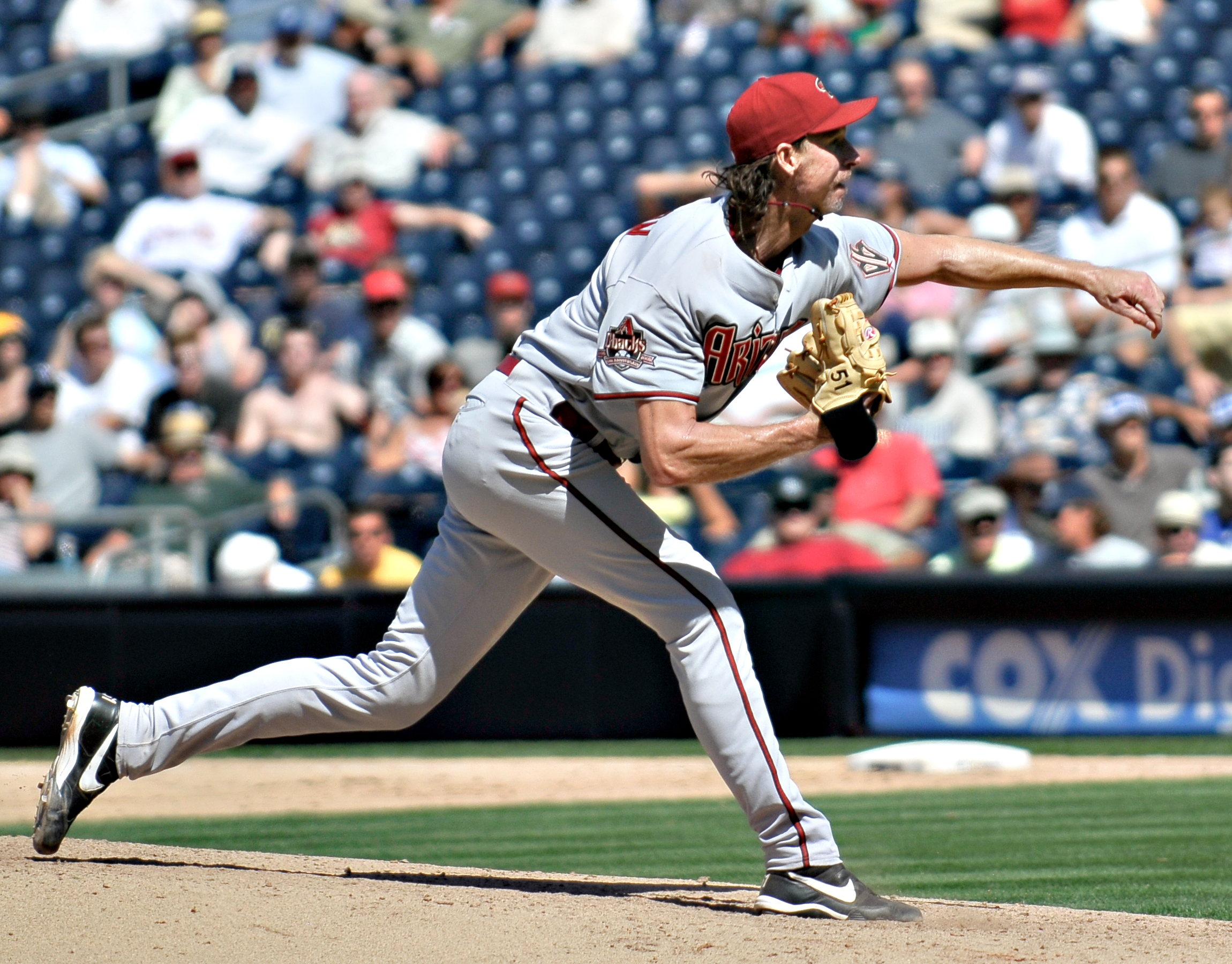
Nolan Ryan (left) is Major League Baseball's all-time strikeout leader at 5,714. Randy Johnson, second all-time in strikeouts, has the most strikeouts for a left-hander at 4,875.

In Major League Baseball (MLB), the 3,000 strikeout club is the group of 20 pitchers who have struck out 3,000 or more batters in their careers. Walter Johnson became the first member in 1923, and was the only one until Bob Gibson joined in 1974. The most recent player to join is Clayton Kershaw, who accomplished the feat on July 2, 2025.

Randy Johnson reached the mark with the fewest games pitched and innings pitched. The Minnesota Twins were the first of five franchises to see multiple pitchers record their 3,000th strikeout: Walter Johnson (while the franchise was called the Washington Senators) in 1923 and Bert Blyleven in 1986. The other teams with multiple members are the Chicago Cubs (Ferguson Jenkins and Greg Maddux), the New York Yankees (Phil Niekro and CC Sabathia), the Houston Astros (Nolan Ryan and Justin Verlander), and the Los Angeles Dodgers (Max Scherzer and Clayton Kershaw). Three players got 3,000 strikeouts with one team: Walter Johnson, Bob Gibson, and Kershaw. César Gerónimo is the only player struck out by two pitchers for their 3,000th strikeout: Gibson in 1974 and Ryan in 1980. Ten 3,000-strikeout pitchers are also members of the 300-win club. Seven members were named to the All-Century Team, a list of MLB's best 100 players; fans later elected four of them as starters. All members of the club also won a Cy Young Award in their careers except for Ryan, Blyleven, Don Sutton, Walter Johnson (whose career predated the award's creation), Niekro, and Curt Schilling. Four pitchers in the group are left-handers: Johnson, Steve Carlton, Clayton Kershaw, and CC Sabathia. Scherzer is the only active member of the club, while also being the active leader in the stat.

The club is considered to almost be a guarantee of entry into the National Baseball Hall of Fame. Fifteen members of the 3,000-strikeout club have been elected to the Hall, most recently Sabathia during the 2025 balloting. Three more members (Kershaw, Scherzer, Verlander) do not yet meet the 5-year eligibility requirement, but are widely considered to be future inductees once eligible. The remaining two, Roger Clemens and Schilling, made their first appearances on the ballot for the 2013 elections and received over 50% of the total votes before falling off the ballot in 2022. Clemens' future election is seen as uncertain because of his alleged links to use of performance-enhancing drugs.

== Key ==
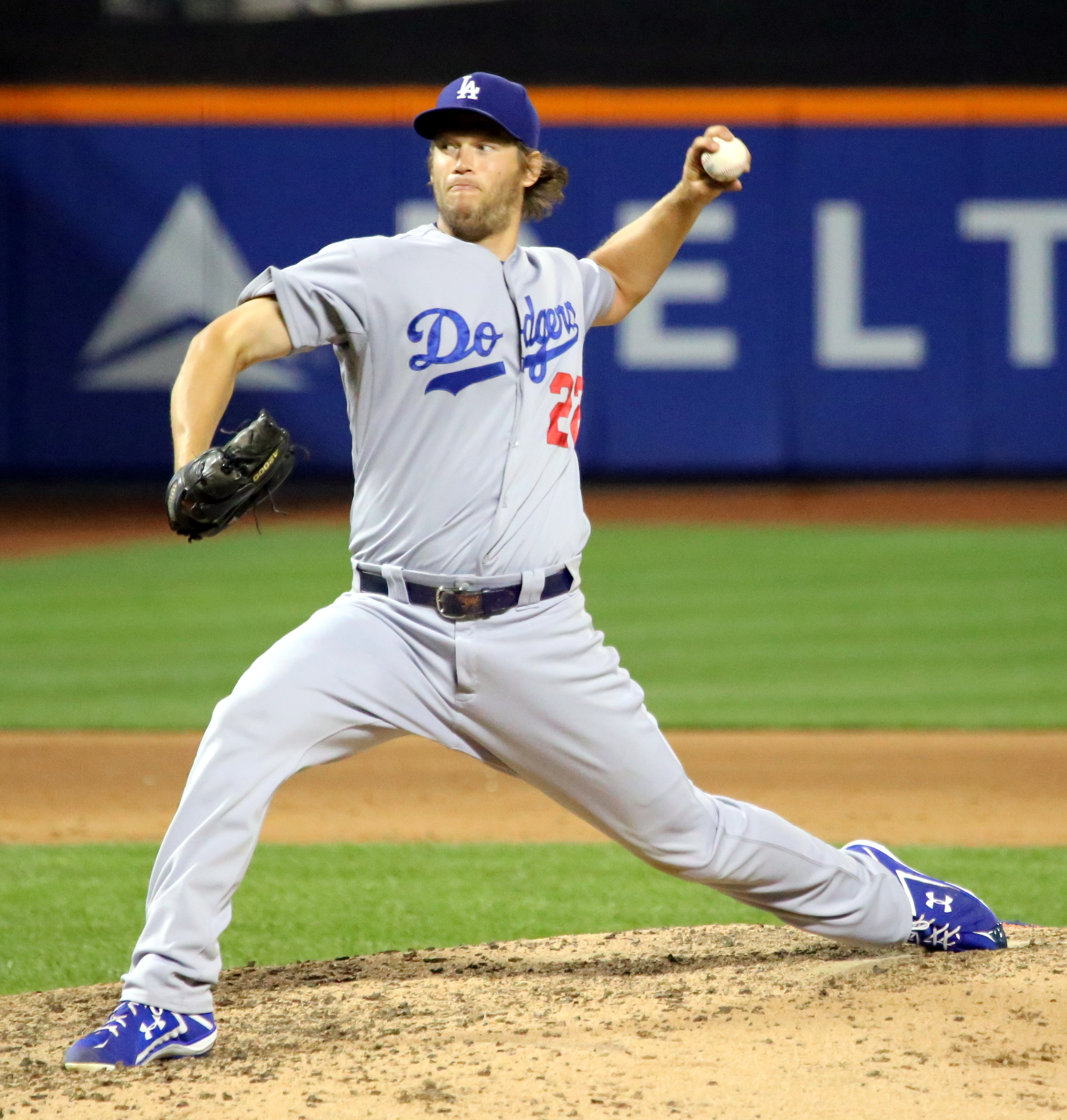
Clayton Kershaw, joining on July 2, 2025, is the most recent addition to the club.

Player	Name of the player
Strikeouts	Career strikeouts
IP	Career innings pitched
Date	Date of the pitcher's 3,000th strikeout
Batter	The batter struck out for the pitcher's 3,000th strikeout
Team	The pitcher's team for his 3,000th strikeout
Seasons	The seasons this player played in the major leagues
†	Elected to the Baseball Hall of Fame
‡	Player is active

== Club members ==
Player	Strikeouts	IP	K/IP	Date	Batter	Team	Seasons
Nolan Ryan^{†}	5,714	5,386	1.06	July 4, 1980	César Gerónimo	Houston Astros	1966, 1968–1993
Randy Johnson^{†}	4,875	4,135 1/3	1.18	September 10, 2000	Mike Lowell	Arizona Diamondbacks	1988–2009
Roger Clemens	4,672	4,916 2/3	0.95	July 5, 1998	Randy Winn	Toronto Blue Jays	1984–2007
Steve Carlton^{†}	4,136	5,217 1/3	0.79	April 29, 1981	Tim Wallach	Philadelphia Phillies	1965–1988
Bert Blyleven^{†}	3,701	4,970	0.74	August 1, 1986	Mike Davis	Minnesota Twins	1970–1992
Tom Seaver^{†}	3,640	4,782 2/3	0.76	April 18, 1981	Keith Hernandez	Cincinnati Reds	1967–1986
Don Sutton^{†}	3,574	5,282 1/3	0.68	June 24, 1983	Alan Bannister	Milwaukee Brewers	1966–1988
Justin Verlander	3,560	3,576 2/3	1.00	September 28, 2019	Kole Calhoun	Houston Astros	2005–2020, 2022–2026
Max Scherzer^{‡}	3,557	3,047 2/3	1.17	September 12, 2021	Eric Hosmer	Los Angeles Dodgers	2008–present
Gaylord Perry^{†}	3,534	5,350 1/3	0.66	October 1, 1978	Joe Simpson	San Diego Padres	1962–1983
Walter Johnson^{†}	3,509	5,914 2/3	0.59	July 22, 1923	Stan Coveleski	Washington Senators	1907–1927
Greg Maddux^{†}	3,371	5,008 1/3	0.67	July 26, 2005	Omar Vizquel	Chicago Cubs	1986–2008
Phil Niekro^{†}	3,342	5,404 1/3	0.62	July 4, 1984	Larry Parrish	New York Yankees	1964–1987
Ferguson Jenkins^{†}	3,192	4,500 2/3	0.71	May 25, 1982	Garry Templeton	Chicago Cubs	1965–1983
Pedro Martínez^{†}	3,154	2,827 1/3	1.12	September 3, 2007	Aaron Harang	New York Mets	1992–2009
Bob Gibson^{†}	3,117	3,884 1/3	0.80	July 17, 1974	César Gerónimo	St. Louis Cardinals	1959–1975
Curt Schilling	3,116	3,261	0.96	August 30, 2006	Nick Swisher	Boston Red Sox	1988–2007
CC Sabathia^{†}	3,093	3,577 1/3	0.86	April 30, 2019	John Ryan Murphy	New York Yankees	2001–2019
John Smoltz^{†}	3,084	3,473	0.88	April 22, 2008	Felipe López	Atlanta Braves	1988–1999, 2001–2009
Clayton Kershaw	3,052	2,855 1/3	1.07	July 2, 2025	Vinny Capra	Los Angeles Dodgers	2008–2025

== See also ==
- List of Major League Baseball career strikeout leaders
- 300 win club
