= Cheating in baseball =

Deliberate violation of baseball rules

Baseball Hall of Famer Gaylord Perry wrote the 1974 book, Me and the Spitter, which detailed how he doctored balls with saliva and other substances during his 22-year major league career.

Baseball personnel have cheated by violating or circumventing the game's rules to gain an unfair advantage against an opponent. Examples of cheating include altering the ball, doctoring bats, electronic sign stealing, and utilizing performance-enhancing drugs.

== Types of cheating ==
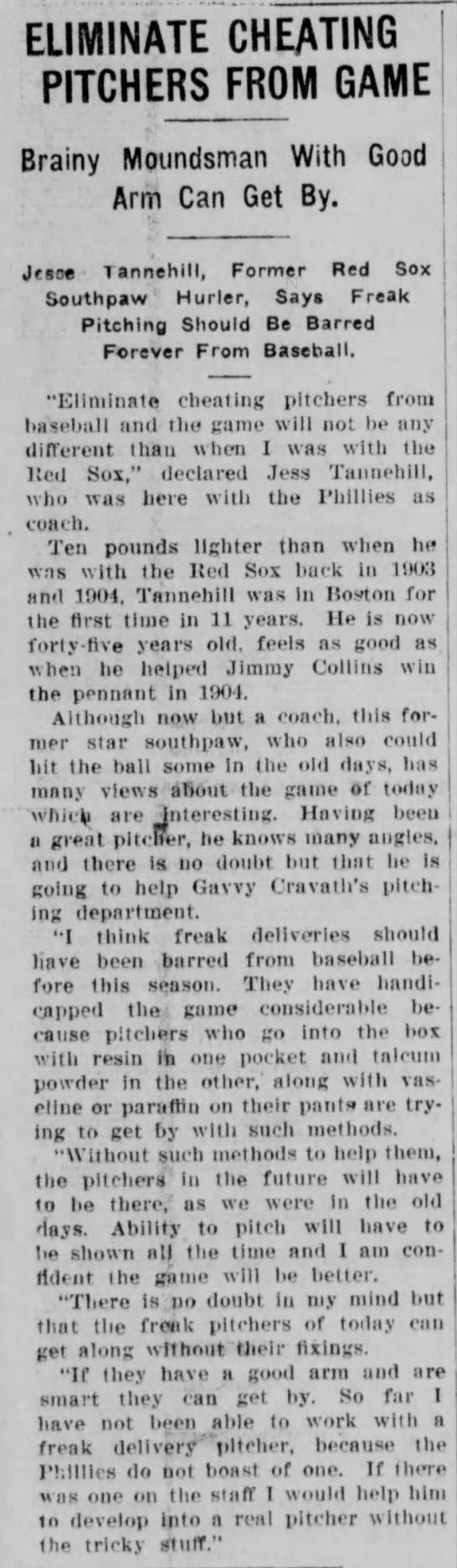
Corsicana Daily Sun article from 1920 lamenting the doctoring of baseballs

=== Doctoring the baseball ===
Pitchers have long doctored baseballs to gain an unfair advantage. The spitball is an illegal baseball pitch where the ball has been altered by the application of a foreign substance, such as saliva or petroleum jelly. The emery ball, also an illegal pitch, consists of throwing a ball that has been scuffed by a rough surface, such as an emery board or sandpaper. Major League Baseball (MLB) banned the emery ball in 1914 and banned the spitball in 1920. At the time the spitball was banned, 17 active pitchers were allowed to continue to throw the pitch through a grandfather clause; the last of these was Burleigh Grimes, who played until 1934.

Examples of illegal doctoring include Joe Niekro, who was caught with an emery board and a small piece of sandpaper during a game on August 3, 1987—he was ejected and suspended for 10 days. Preacher Roe, who pitched in MLB for 12 seasons during 1938–1954, was featured in a 1955 Sports Illustrated article entitled "The Outlawed Spitball Was My Money Pitch". Gaylord Perry, a hall of famer and major league pitcher from 1962 to 1983, entitled his 1974 autobiography Me and the Spitter, although he was only ejected once for doctoring the baseball.

=== Grip enhancers ===
Pitchers have used sticky substances, such as pine tar, to enhance their grip and greatly improve the spin rate of a thrown baseball, which results in more movement on pitches. While the use of such "foreign substances" is a violation of MLB rules, historically, it was rarely enforced. The only substance that pitchers may legally use to improve their grip is rosin, via a rosin bag kept on the mound.

Grip enhancing substances are usually hidden somewhere, such as inside a pitcher's glove or cap, so it can be accessed while pitching. Michael Pineda of the New York Yankees was ejected from a game on April 23, 2014, after being caught with a smear of pine tar on the right side of his neck.

Large increases in measured spin rates during the 2020 and 2021 MLB seasons led to scrutiny of this area. A highly effective grip enhancer used by pitchers to increase spin rates has been Spider Tack, a product developed for strongman competitors to have a better grip on 100-to-160-kilogram (220 to 350 lb) concrete Atlas stones. In May 2021, four pitchers in Minor League Baseball received 10-game suspensions after being caught using grip enhancers. On June 15, 2021, MLB announced new guidance regarding "a uniform standard for the consistent application of the rules, including regular checks of all pitchers regardless of whether an opposing club's manager makes a request." Included in MLB's announcement were mandatory checks of all pitchers by umpires, with any player found to have a foreign substance immediately ejected and suspended for 10 games. Enforcement across MLB began on June 21, with Seattle Mariners pitcher Hector Santiago becoming the first player to be ejected under the heightened enforcement, on June 27.

=== Corked bats ===
Hitters have altered their baseball bats with lighter materials to allow them to swing the bat faster compared to a solid wood bat of equal size. A corked bat is one with some of its interior removed and replaced with a lighter material, such as cork or Super Balls. Players who have been suspended for using a corked bat include Sammy Sosa, Albert Belle, Wilton Guerrero, Chris Sabo, Billy Hatcher, José Guillén, and Miguel Olivo.

=== Sign stealing ===
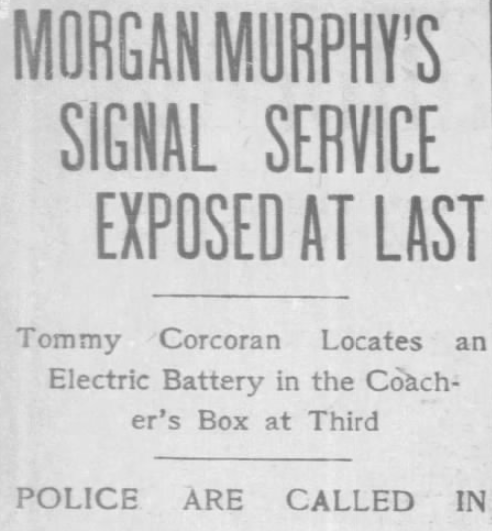
A Philadelphia Inquirer headline from September 1900 about sign stealing by the Philadelphia Phillies

Baseball organizations can gain an advantage by stealing the signs used by other teams. However, they are prohibited from using technology to aid them in stealing signs and communicating the information to their teammates. Two notable incidents of sign stealing include the 1951 New York Giants, who used a telescope and buzzer system, and the Houston Astros sign stealing scandal of 2017–2018. The Boston Red Sox were fined for having used an Apple Watch to relay stolen signs during the 2017 season, and had their video replay operator suspended for the 2020 season after he used video replay to decode sign sequences during some games in 2018.

=== Performance-enhancing drugs ===
Baseball players have used amphetamines and steroids to enhance their physical performance. The United States Army gave amphetamines, such as Dexedrine and Benzedrine, to soldiers during World War II, and baseball players who fought in the war introduced them to baseball clubhouses after they returned. During the Pittsburgh drug trials in 1985, Dave Parker and Dale Berra testified in court that Willie Stargell provided them with amphetamines, while John Milner testified about Willie Mays' use of amphetamines. Anabolic steroids were banned by baseball in 1991, though no program was established for drug testing.

Following the 1998 home run record chase, more attention was paid to steroids and other performance-enhancing substances. In 2002, MLB and the Major League Baseball Players Association (MLBPA) agreed to a new collective bargaining agreement that included mandatory testing for performance-enhancing substances. The federal government began to investigate the Bay Area Laboratory Co-Operative (BALCO) in 2003; the ensuing BALCO scandal resulted in a federal grand jury investigation that compelled testimony from athletes including Marion Jones, Jason Giambi, and Barry Bonds, and determined that 27 athletes received steroids from BALCO. A panel of players and executives testified on steroid use in baseball before the House Government Reform Committee in 2005. Former U.S. Senator George J. Mitchell led a 20-month investigation on steroids in baseball that resulted in the release of the Mitchell Report in 2007.

Mandatory testing expanded to include amphetamines and other stimulants in 2005. In 2011, testing was expanded to include human growth hormone (HGH). The Biogenesis scandal broke in 2013, alleging that Alex Rodriguez and Ryan Braun acquired HGH from an anti-aging clinic. A total of 13 players received suspensions.

=== Altering the grounds ===
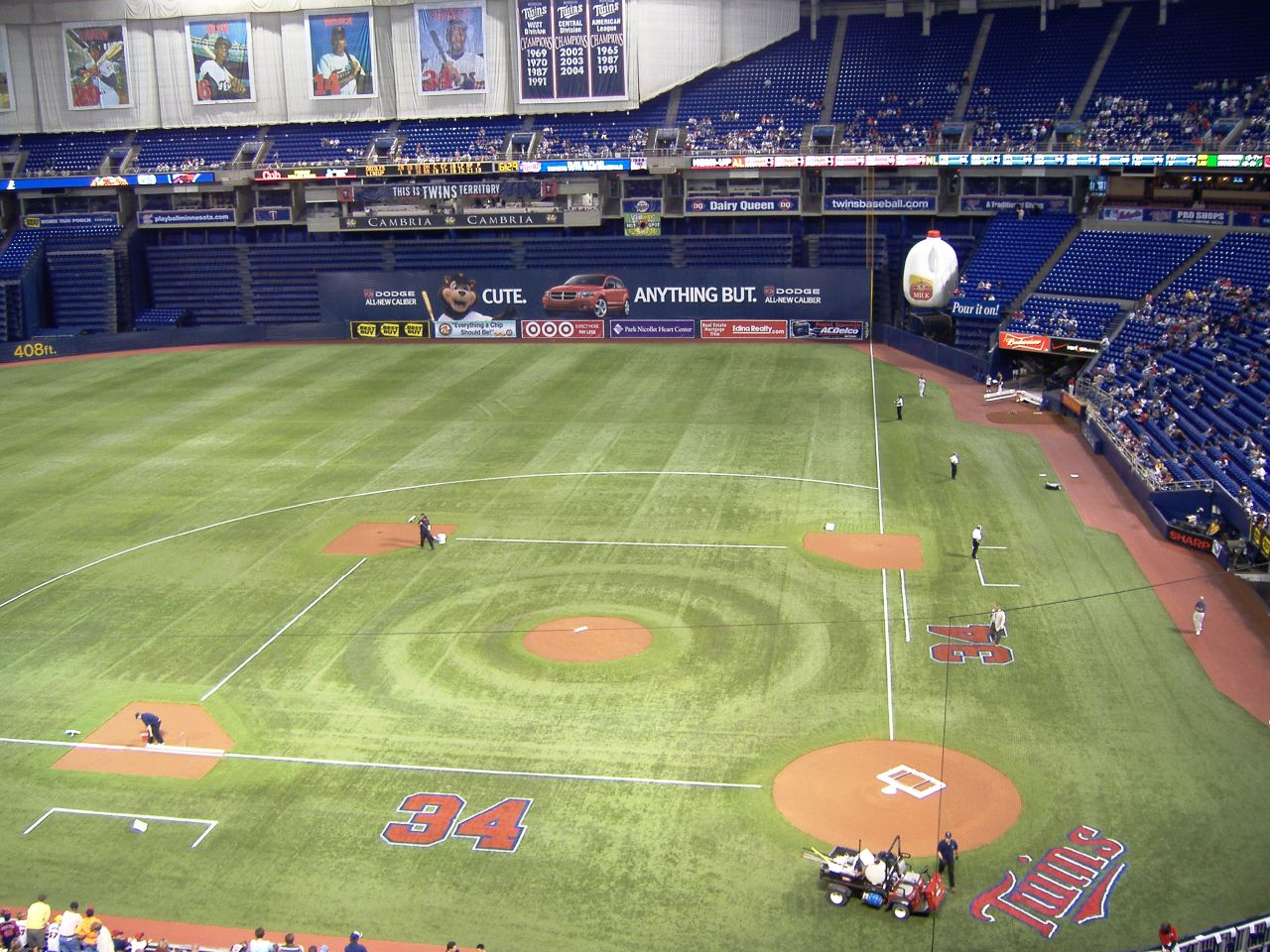
Interior of the Metrodome, where airflow was reportedly manipulated to favor the Minnesota Twins

Groundskeepers have been involved in attempts to cheat. On April 25, 1981, Seattle Mariners manager Maury Wills had the Seattle grounds crew draw the batter's box 1 foot (0.30 m) longer than allowed by the rule book (towards the pitching mound) as the Oakland Athletics had previously complained that Seattle batter Tom Paciorek was stepping outside the box while batting. Oakland manager Billy Martin spotted the modified batters box prior to the game; the box was correctly redrawn, and Wills was subsequently suspended for two games. Teams would also often water down basepaths to slow down opposing baserunners, something which was considered gamesmanship. Opposing teams suspected that airflow in the Metrodome, home of the Minnesota Twins from 1982 to 2009, was manipulated to help the Twins' balls up and out and push the away team's inwards; a former superintendent claimed in 2003 that he had done so, and characterized it as "home-field advantage".

=== Pitching in the 19th century ===
In its early genesis, how baseball was played on the field evolved rapidly. The original role of pitchers was to put the ball into play for batters to hit, rather than try to prevent batters from striking the ball, as described in the inaugural Knickerbocker Base Ball Club rule set from 1845: "The ball must be pitched, not thrown, for the bat." Pitchers began intentionally throwing pitches hard to hit, however, waiting for batters to eventually swing at them, until the introduction in 1863 of "called balls" by the umpire "[s]hould the pitcher repeatedly fail to deliver to the striker fair balls". The term "pitch" in the rule referred to throwing with a straight, stiff arm and wrist, in an underhanded style influenced by cricket bowlers. It was common though for pitchers to flick their wrists to impart spin, thereby affecting the baseball's trajectory. By the late 1860s, the restrictions against bending at the elbow or snapping the wrist were rarely enforced, and thus in 1872 the rules were changed to permit them. Although pitchers were still required to throw underhanded, their motion crept up over time to a three-quarter style, which led to the rules being altered in 1883 to allow it. A full overhand delivery was only permitted by the National League in 1884, and by the American Association in 1885.

=== Age fabrication ===
Players have lied about their own ages to increase the level of interest they receive from scouts. Players who claimed to be younger than they were include Rube Marquard, Phil Rizzuto, Pee Wee Reese, and Hal McRae.

Players from the Dominican Republic have engaged in age fabrication to improve their chances of getting a contract offer. Some have also changed their names, including Roberto Hernández, Santiago Casilla, Juan Carlos Oviedo, Wandy Rodríguez, and Carlos Alvarez. Danny Almonte competed in the 2001 Little League World Series, despite being 14 years old and the cutoff age for the tournament being set at 12.

=== Other actions to circumvent rules ===
Various other efforts to skirt the rules have been employed. A prominent example of intentionally trying to lose a game, which can enable gamblers who are involved with such a scheme to win significant amounts of money, is the Black Sox Scandal of 1919 that resulted in eight players being permanently banned from professional baseball.

On August 19, 1951, the St. Louis Browns sent Eddie Gaedel to bat—Gaedel had been signed to a contract by team owner Bill Veeck because of his height of 3 feet 7 inches (1.09 m), which made his strike zone exceptionally small. Gaedel walked (as expected) and was replaced by a pinch runner. American League president Will Harridge voided Gaedel's contract the following day, and unsuccessfully attempted to strike Gaedel's appearance from the record books.

In 1987, a minor-league catcher for the Double-A Williamsport Bills hid a potato in his glove, which he threw past a runner at third base so the runner would attempt to score, and then tagged out the runner with the real baseball. The umpires ruled that the run counted. The catcher was removed from the game by his manager and later released by the team.

After being ejected from a game on June 9, 1999, New York Mets manager Bobby Valentine changed his appearance by putting on a hat, sunglasses, and a fake mustache, then returned to the dugout—he was spotted, and later suspended for two games.

The 2014 Little League World Series saw the disqualification of the second-place team after it was found that many of the players lived outside of the acceptable geographic range.

Some actions, such as fielders attempting to mislead baserunners about the location of the ball, are considered gamesmanship and are not in violation of the rules.

== Penalties for cheating ==
When detected by an umpire during a game, illegal actions such as doctoring the baseball or using a doctored bat result in an immediate ejection. Such ejections are rare in Major League Baseball, with less than 50 instances of "doctored" or "doctoring" appearing in a log of nearly 18,000 ejections since 1889—by comparison, "fighting" appears over 700 times. Any professional player who is ejected from a game typically receives a mandatory fine, and additional penalty may also be imposed in follow-up by league officials, such as a suspension for a number of games or calendar days.

Acts of cheating that are not detected during a game may still result in punishment. The above noted incidents of illegal sign stealing during 2017 and 2018 by the Houston Astros and Boston Red Sox were discovered after-the-fact, and resulted in punishment meted out by the Commissioner of Baseball. As punishment for the Houston Astros sign stealing scandal, general manager Jeff Luhnow, field manager A. J. Hinch, and bench coach Alex Cora (who had subsequently become manager of the Boston Red Sox) were each suspended for the 2020 MLB season by commissioner Rob Manfred, which further resulted in Luhnow and Hinch being fired by the Astros.

Rule 21 of The Official Professional Baseball Rules Book enumerates misconduct for which personnel can be declared permanently ineligible: misconduct in playing baseball (throwing games), gifts to umpires, and gambling on a baseball game "in connection with which the bettor has a duty to perform". The rule is required to be posted, in both English and Spanish, in all major league clubhouses. For determining penalties for other violations, broad discretion is granted to the commissioner via Rule 50, "Enforcement of Major League Rules", which specifies "action consistent with the commissioner's powers under the Major League Constitution".

Steroid use, admitted or suspected, has affected balloting for the National Baseball Hall of Fame for multiple players, including: Barry Bonds, Roger Clemens, Mark McGwire, Rafael Palmeiro, Gary Sheffield, and Sammy Sosa.

Shoeless Joe Jackson is generally considered to have had a Hall of Fame-worthy career, including a .356 batting average in 13 major-league seasons, but was ineligible for election for many decades due to his permanent ban resulting from the Black Sox Scandal. Pete Rose, the all-time major-league leader in several categories including hits, singles, and games played, accepted a permanent ban in 1989 shortly after publication of an investigation into his involvement with betting on baseball. In 1991, the Hall of Fame declared all permanently banned individuals to be ineligible for induction, even after their death. In May 2025, Rob Manfred ruled that such bans, including those meted out to Jackson and Rose, ended when a player dies, thus creating opportunity for the players to be inducted into the Hall of Fame if they are elected by an applicable Veterans Committee.

== See also ==
- Cheating in: bridge, casinos, chess, esports, online games, Paralympic Games, poker, video games
- List of sporting scandals
- Pine Tar Incident – a 1983 incident involving a rules violation for excessive pine tar on a bat, but without evidence of this providing a playing advantage
