= List of Major League Baseball career strikeout leaders =

This list is for pitchers. For career strikeouts by batters, see List of Major League Baseball career strikeouts by batters leaders.

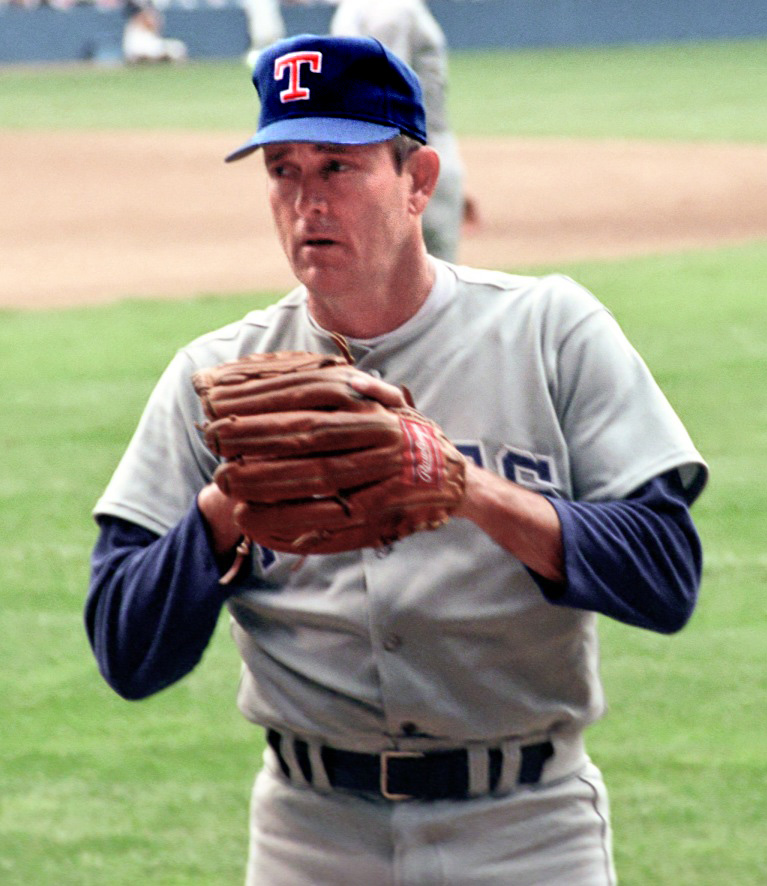
Nolan Ryan is the all-time leader in career strikeouts.

The following list is of the top 100 pitchers in career strikeouts in Major League Baseball. In baseball, a strikeout occurs when the batter receives three strikes during his time at bat. Strikeouts are associated with dominance on the part of the pitcher and failure on the part of the batter.

Nolan Ryan has the most career strikeouts in Major League Baseball. During a record 27-year career, he struck out 5,714 batters. The American League record is held by Roger Clemens (4,167 strikeouts), while in the National League, the record is 4,136 by Steve Carlton.

The parentheses adjacent to an active player denote the number of strikeouts in the current season. The last change in the cutoff for the top 100 occurred on September 5, 2026, when Zack Wheeler struck out his 1,979th batter, passing up John Clarkson and Ervin Santana.

== List ==
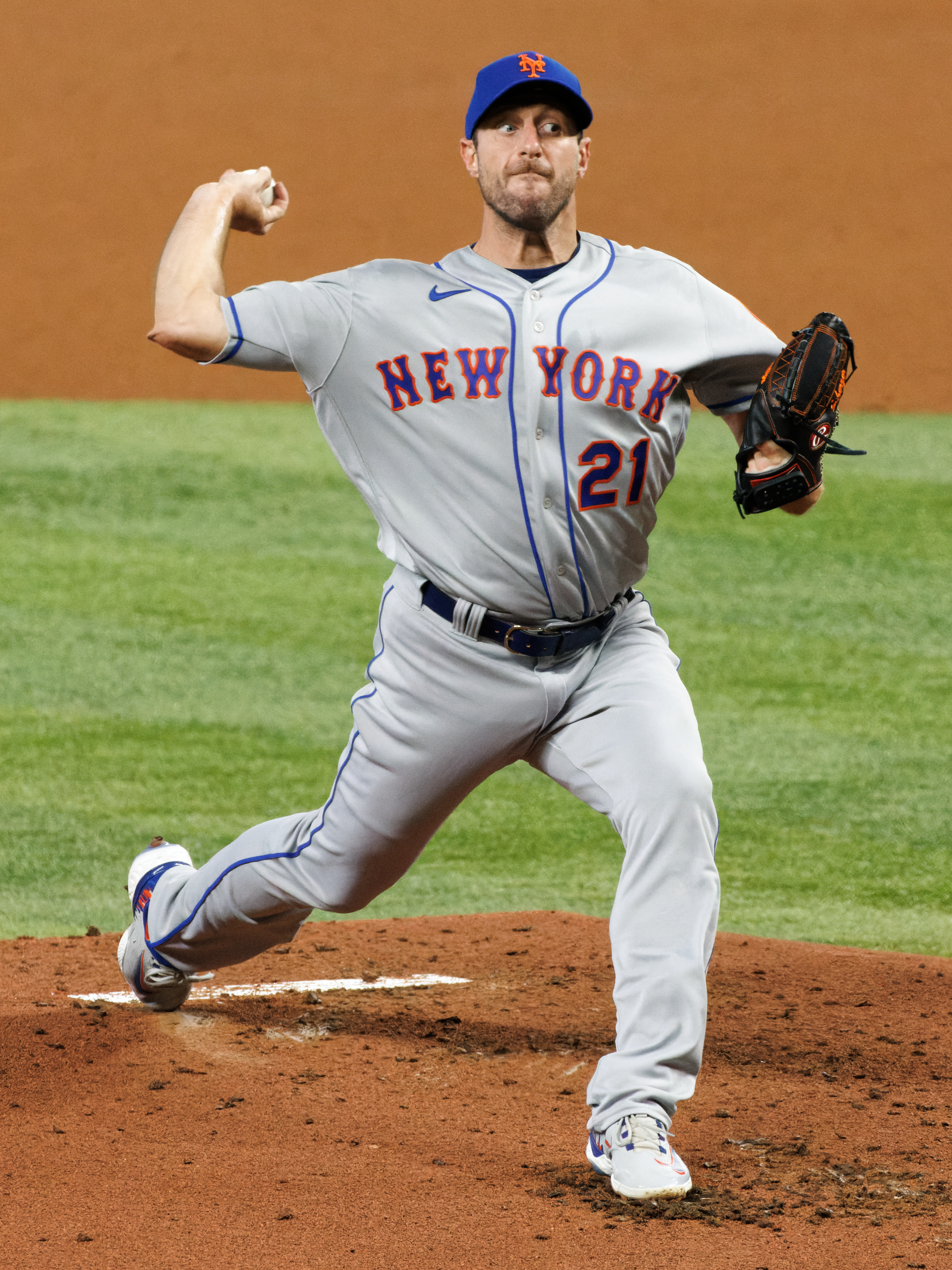
Max Scherzer is the active leader in career strikeouts and 9th all-time.

†	Denotes elected to National Baseball Hall of Fame.
**Bold**	Denotes active player (with 2027 season strikeouts shown).

A player is considered "inactive" if he has not played baseball for one year or has announced his retirement.

- Stats updated as of 2026 Season.

Rank	Player	K
1	Nolan Ryan †	5,714
2	Randy Johnson †	4,875
3	Roger Clemens	4,672
4	Steve Carlton †	4,136
5	Bert Blyleven †	3,701
6	Tom Seaver †	3,640
7	Don Sutton †	3,574
8	Justin Verlander	3,560
9	**Max Scherzer (0)**	3,557
10	Gaylord Perry †	3,534
11	Walter Johnson †	3,509
12	Greg Maddux †	3,371
13	Phil Niekro †	3,342
14	Ferguson Jenkins †	3,192
15	Pedro Martínez †	3,154
16	Bob Gibson †	3,117
17	Curt Schilling	3,116
18	CC Sabathia †	3,093
19	John Smoltz †	3,084
20	Clayton Kershaw	3,052
21	Zack Greinke	2,979
22	Jim Bunning †	2,855
23	Mickey Lolich	2,832
24	Mike Mussina †	2,813
25	Cy Young †	2,803
26	**Chris Sale (0)**	2,779
27	Frank Tanana	2,773
28	David Cone	2,668
29	Chuck Finley	2,610
30	Tom Glavine †	2,607
31	Warren Spahn †	2,583
32	Bob Feller †	2,581
33	Tim Keefe †	2,564
34	Cole Hamels	2,560
35	Jerry Koosman	2,556
36	Javier Vázquez	2,536
37	Bartolo Colón	2,535
38	Félix Hernández	2,524
39	A. J. Burnett	2,513
40	Christy Mathewson †	2,502
41	Jon Lester	2,488
42	Don Drysdale †	2,486
43	Jack Morris †	2,478
44	Mark Langston	2,464
45	Jim Kaat †	2,461
46	Sam McDowell	2,453
47	Andy Pettitte	2,448
48	Jamie Moyer	2,441
49	Luis Tiant	2,416
50	Dennis Eckersley †	2,401

Rank	Player	K
51	Kevin Brown	2,397
52	Sandy Koufax †	2,396
53	**Gerrit Cole (0)**	2,382
54	Charlie Hough	2,362
55	Robin Roberts †	2,357
56	Early Wynn †	2,334
57	Rube Waddell †	2,316
58	Juan Marichal †	2,303
59	John Lackey	2,294
60	Dwight Gooden	2,293
61	Lefty Grove †	2,266
62	Eddie Plank †	2,246
63	Tommy John	2,245
64	James Shields	2,234
65	Jim Palmer †	2,212
66	Jake Peavy	2,207
67	Adam Wainwright	2,202
68	David Wells	2,201
69	Grover Cleveland Alexander †	2,198
70	Charlie Morton	2,196
71	Vida Blue	2,175
72	Camilo Pascual	2,167
73	Tim Wakefield	2,156
74	Dennis Martínez	2,149
75	**Kevin Gausman (0)**	2,138
76	Roy Halladay †	2,117
77	Kevin Millwood	2,083
78	Bobo Newsom	2,082
79	Tim Hudson	2,080
80	David Price	2,076
81	**Yu Darvish (0)**	2,075
	Ryan Dempster	2,075
83	**Sonny Gray (0)**	2,074
	Fernando Valenzuela	2,074
85	Madison Bumgarner	2,070
86	**Aaron Nola (0)**	2,053
87	**Jacob deGrom** **(0)**	2,052
88	Dazzy Vance †	2,045
89	Lance Lynn	2,015
	Rick Reuschel	2,015
91	Orel Hershiser	2,014
92	Dan Haren	2,013
	**Zack Wheeler (0)**	2,013
94	Catfish Hunter †	2,012
95	Andy Benes	2,000
96	Billy Pierce	1,999
97	Kevin Appier	1,994
98	Johan Santana	1,988
99	Red Ruffing †	1,987
100	John Clarkson †	1,978
	Ervin Santana	1,978

== See also ==
- 3,000 strikeout club
