= 300-win club =

Statistical achievement in Major League Baseball

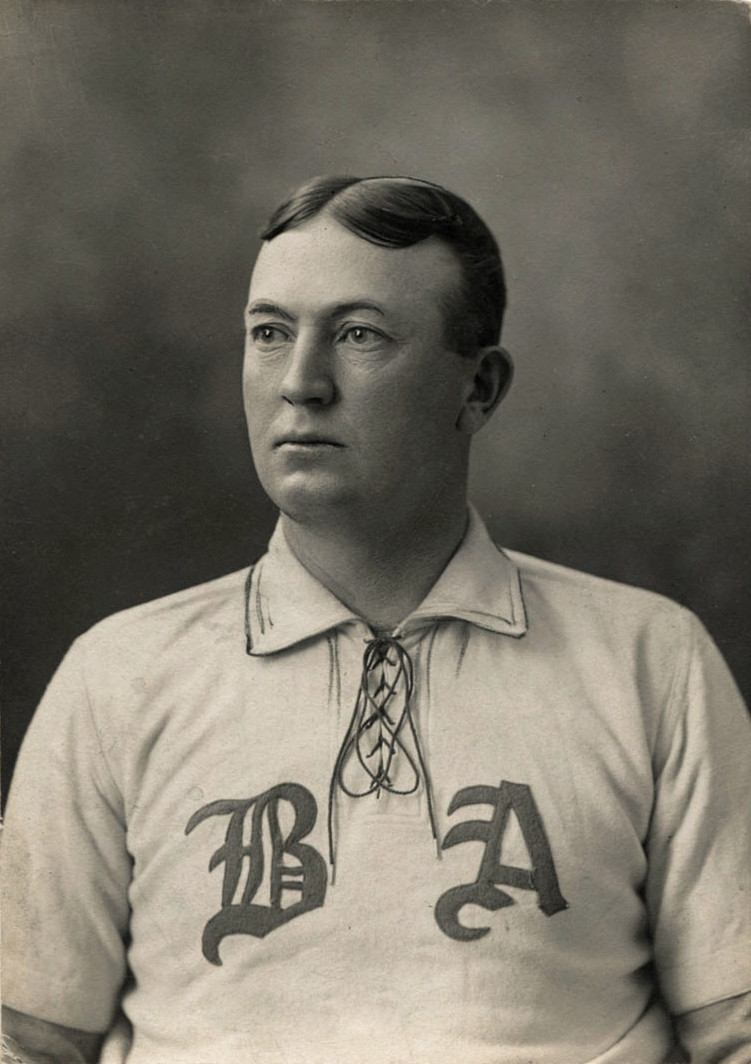
Cy Young is the all-time leader in wins.

In Major League Baseball, the 300-win club is the group of pitchers who have won 300 or more games. Twenty-four pitchers have reached this milestone. This list does not include Bobby Mathews who won 297 in the major leagues plus several more in 1869 and 1870 before the major leagues were established in 1871. Early in the history of professional baseball, many of the rules favored the pitcher over the batter; the distance pitchers threw to home plate was shorter than today, and pitchers were able to use foreign substances to alter the direction of the ball. Moreover, a schedule with rest days after most games allowed pitchers to start a far higher proportion of their team's games than modern pitchers do, typically every other game or even more (in the second half of the 1884 season Old Hoss Radbourn started 40 games out of 43). The first player to win 300 games was Pud Galvin in 1888. Seven pitchers recorded all or the majority of their career wins in the 19th century: Galvin, Cy Young, Kid Nichols, Keefe, John Clarkson, Charles Radbourn, and Welch. Four more pitchers joined the club in the first quarter of the 20th century: Christy Mathewson, Walter Johnson, Eddie Plank, and Grover Cleveland Alexander. Young is the all-time leader in wins with 511, a mark that is considered unbreakable. If a modern-day pitcher won 20 games per season for 25 seasons, he would still be 11 games short of Young's mark.

Only three pitchers—Lefty Grove, Warren Spahn, and Early Wynn—joined the 300-win club between 1924 and 1982, which may be explained by a number of factors: the abolition of the spitball (Note: Though it is illegal to doctor the baseball, Don Sutton and Gaylord Perry, members of the 300-win club and Hall of Fame, were widely suspected of this behavior.); World War II military service, such as Bob Feller's; and the growing importance of the home run in the game. As the home run became commonplace, the physical and mental demands on pitchers dramatically increased, which led to the use of a four-man starting rotation. Between 1982 and 1990, the 300-win club gained six members: Gaylord Perry, Phil Niekro, Steve Carlton, Nolan Ryan, Don Sutton, and Tom Seaver. These pitchers benefited from baseball's increase from a 154-game schedule to a 162-game schedule in 1961, and expansion of the league from 16 teams in 1960 to 26 by 1977. The increased use of specialized relief pitchers, an expanded strike zone, and new stadiums, including Shea Stadium, Dodger Stadium and the Astrodome, that were pitcher's parks all also suppressed offensive production. Also, the increasing sophistication of training methods and sports medicine - such as Tommy John surgery - allowed players to maintain a high competitive level for a longer time. Randy Johnson, for example, won more games in his 40s than he did in his 20s.

Since Ryan joined the 300-win club in 1990, only four pitchers have done so: Roger Clemens, Greg Maddux, Tom Glavine, and Randy Johnson. Changes in the game in the last decade of the 20th century have made attaining 300 career wins difficult, perhaps more so than during the mid-20th century. The four-man starting rotation has given way to a five-man rotation, which gives starting pitchers fewer chances to pick up wins. Other factors such as pitch count management, use of advanced metrics, and the recent prevalence of bullpen games made it more difficult for a starting pitcher to win a game. No pitcher reached 20 wins in a non-shortened season for the first time in 2006; this was repeated in 2009, 2017, 2024 and 2025.

Recording 300 career wins has been seen as a guaranteed admission to the Baseball Hall of Fame. All pitchers with 300 wins have been elected to the Hall of Fame except for Clemens, who received only half of the vote total needed for induction in his first appearance on the Hall of Fame ballot in 2013 and lost votes from that total in 2014. Clemens fell off the ballot in 2022 and can only be elected via the players' Contemporary Baseball Era ballot of the Veterans Committee. Clemens' future election is seen as uncertain because of his alleged links to use of performance-enhancing drugs. Many observers expect the club to gain few, if any, members in the foreseeable future. Ten members of the 300-win club are also members of the 3,000 strikeout club.

== Members ==
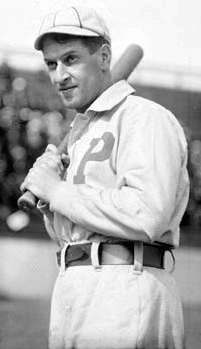
Kid Nichols was the youngest pitcher to win 300 games, achieving the feat at age 30.

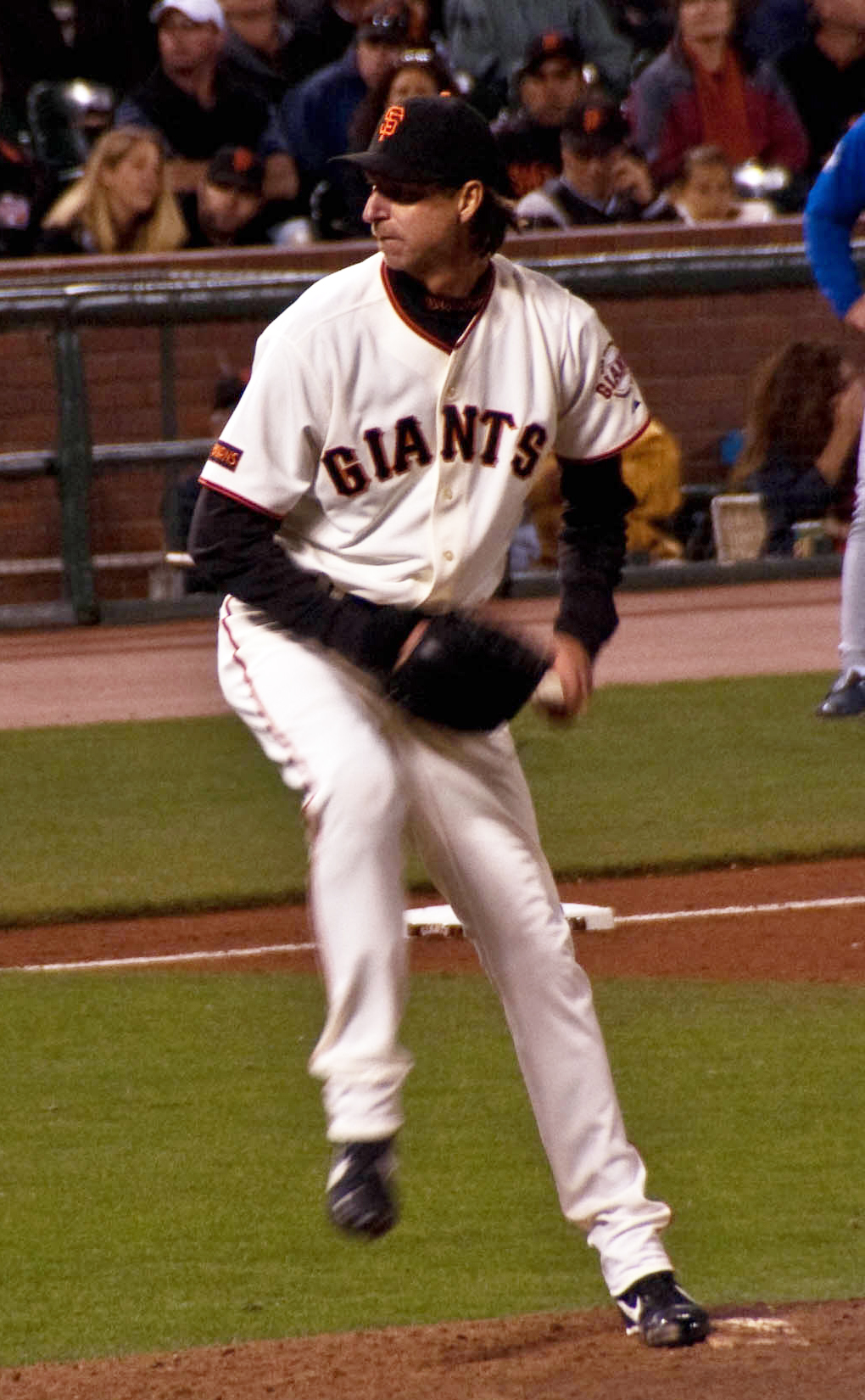
Randy Johnson is the most recent member of the 300-win club.

Key
Pitcher	Name of the pitcher
Wins	Career wins
Date	Date of the player's 300th win
Team	The pitcher's team for his 300th win
Seasons	The seasons this player played in the major leagues
†	Elected to the Baseball Hall of Fame

Members of the 300-win club
Pitcher	Wins	Date	Team	Seasons	Ref
Cy Young^{†}	511	July 12, 1901	Boston Americans	1890–1911	
Walter Johnson^{†}	417	May 14, 1920	Washington Senators	1907–1927	
Grover Cleveland Alexander^{†}	373	September 20, 1924	Chicago Cubs	1911–1930	
Christy Mathewson^{†}	373	June 13, 1912	New York Giants	1900–1916	
Pud Galvin^{†}	365	October 5, 1888	Pittsburgh Alleghenys	1875, 1879–1892	
Warren Spahn^{†}	363	August 11, 1961	Milwaukee Braves	1942, 1946–1965	
Kid Nichols^{†}	362	July 7, 1900	Boston Beaneaters	1890–1901, 1904–1906	
Greg Maddux^{†}	355	August 7, 2004	Chicago Cubs	1986–2008	
Roger Clemens	354	June 13, 2003	New York Yankees	1984–2007	
Tim Keefe^{†}	342	June 4, 1890	New York Giants (PL)	1880–1893	
Steve Carlton^{†}	329	September 23, 1983	Philadelphia Phillies	1965–1988	
John Clarkson^{†}	328	September 21, 1892	Cleveland Spiders	1882–1894	
Eddie Plank^{†}	326	September 11, 1915	St. Louis Terriers	1901–1917	
Nolan Ryan^{†}	324	July 31, 1990	Texas Rangers	1966, 1968–1993	
Don Sutton^{†}	324	June 18, 1986	California Angels	1966–1988	
Phil Niekro^{†}	318	October 6, 1985	New York Yankees	1964–1987	
Gaylord Perry^{†}	314	May 6, 1982	Seattle Mariners	1962–1983	
Tom Seaver^{†}	311	August 4, 1985	Chicago White Sox	1967–1986	
Charles Radbourn^{†}	310	June 2, 1891	Cincinnati Reds	1880–1891	
Mickey Welch^{†}	307	July 28, 1890	New York Giants	1880–1892	
Tom Glavine^{†}	305	August 5, 2007	New York Mets	1987–2008	
Randy Johnson^{†}	303	June 4, 2009	San Francisco Giants	1988–2009	
Early Wynn^{†}	300	July 13, 1963	Cleveland Indians	1939–1944, 1946–1963	
Lefty Grove^{†}	300	July 25, 1941	Boston Red Sox	1925–1941	

== See also ==
- Baseball statistics
- List of Major League Baseball leaders in games started
- List of Major League Baseball career wins leaders
- 3,000 strikeout club

== Sources ==
- "Career Leaders & Records for Wins". Baseball-Reference.com. Archived from the original on May 9, 2022.
- "300 Wins Club". Baseball-Almanac.com. Baseball Almanac. Archived from the original on 26 July 2010.
- "300-game winners in MLB history". MLB.com.
