= Gaylord Perry =

American baseball player (1938–2022)

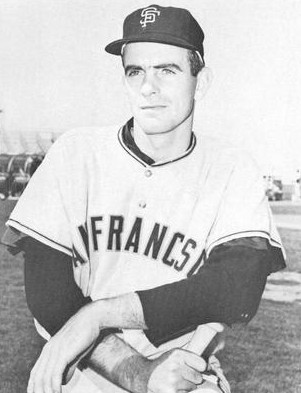
- Perry with the San Francisco Giants in 1965
- Pitcher
- Born: September 15, 1938; Williamston, North Carolina, U.S.
- Died: December 1, 2022 (aged 84); Gaffney, South Carolina, U.S.
- Batted: Right Threw: Right

MLB debut
- April 14, 1962, for the San Francisco Giants

Last MLB appearance
- September 21, 1983, for the Kansas City Royals

MLB statistics
- Win–loss record: 314–265
- Earned run average: 3.11
- Strikeouts: 3,534
- Stats at Baseball Reference

Teams
- San Francisco Giants (1962–1971); Cleveland Indians (1972–1975); Texas Rangers (1975–1977); San Diego Padres (1978–1979); Texas Rangers (1980); New York Yankees (1980); Atlanta Braves (1981); Seattle Mariners (1982–1983); Kansas City Royals (1983)

Career highlights and awards
- 5× All-Star (1966, 1970, 1972, 1974, 1979); 2× Cy Young Award (1972, 1978); 3× Wins leader (1970, 1972, 1978); Pitched a no-hitter on September 17, 1968; San Francisco Giants No. 36 retired; San Francisco Giants Wall of Fame; Cleveland Guardians Hall of Fame

Member of the National

Baseball Hall of Fame
- Induction: 1991
- Vote: 77.2% (third ballot)

Gaylord Jackson Perry (September 15, 1938 – December 1, 2022) was an American right-handed pitcher in Major League Baseball (MLB) who played for eight teams from 1962 to 1983, becoming one of the most durable and successful pitchers in history. A five-time All-Star, Perry was the first pitcher to win the Cy Young Award in both leagues. He won the American League (AL) award in 1972 after leading the league with 24 wins with a 1.92 earned run average (ERA) for the fifth-place Cleveland Indians and took the National League (NL) award in 1978 with the San Diego Padres after again leading the league with 21 wins; his Cy Young Award announcement just as he turned the age of 40 made him the oldest to win the award, which stood as a record for 26 years until Roger Clemens won the Cy Young in 2004 at 42 years old. He and his older brother Jim Perry, who were Cleveland teammates in 1974–1975, became the first brothers to both win 200 games in the major leagues and remain the only brothers to both win Cy Young Awards.

Perry gained notoriety for doctoring baseballs (e.g. throwing spitballs), and perhaps even more so for making batters think he was throwing them on a regular basis—he went so far as to title his 1974 autobiography Me and the Spitter, though he claimed that his use of the prohibited practice was in the past. He was the subject of two decades of controversy during which opposing managers, umpires, and league officials frequently attempted to catch him in a violation, even revising rules and guidelines; despite the constant scrutiny, he was not ejected from a game for the practice until his 21st season in the majors in 1982. In the meantime, Perry firmly established himself as one of baseball's most accomplished pitchers. He won 20 games five times and struck out 200 batters eight times, leading his league in innings pitched and complete games twice each. He pitched a no-hitter in September 1968, three weeks after throwing a one-hitter, and also pitched 13 career two-hitters. In 1978, Perry became the third pitcher to register 3,000 strikeouts. In 1982, he became the first pitcher in 19 years to join the 300 win club; he joined Walter Johnson to become only the second pitcher to reach both milestones.

During a 22-year career, with most of its second half spent with losing teams, Perry compiled 314 wins; upon his retirement, he ranked third in major league history with 3,534 strikeouts and his 690 games started placing him behind only Cy Young's 815. His 5,350 innings pitched ranked fourth; he had been the first right-handed pitcher since the 1920s to surpass 5,000 innings. He was the last pitcher to throw 300 complete games and was then the eighth-oldest pitcher ever to start a major league game. Perry was elected to the Baseball Hall of Fame in 1991 in his third year of eligibility, a delay widely regarded as resulting from his career-long controversies.

== Early life ==
Perry was born on September 15, 1938, in Williamston, North Carolina, and named after a close friend of his father's, who had died while having his teeth pulled.

Perry was the son of Evan and Ruby Perry, who were farmers. Evan had been a noted athlete. Perry grew up with his older brother Jim and younger sister Carolyn in Williamston and the small area of Farmlife, a populated place located within the Township of Griffins, a minor division of Martin County. He assisted his father with farming on their family's land in this area. Perry and his older brother both began playing baseball with their father during their lunch break on the farm as youths.

Perry attended Williamston High School, where he played football, basketball, and baseball. He was All-State as an offensive and defensive end as a sophomore and junior, before giving up football. In basketball, he and Jim helped Williamston to reach the state finals in his first year. In his career at Williamston, Gaylord averaged nearly 30 points and 20 rebounds per game, as Williamston had a 94–8 record. He would turn down dozens of college basketball scholarship offers.

In baseball, Perry initially was a third baseman as a freshman, and Jim was the pitcher for Williamston. However, near the end of his first year, he began sharing pitching duties with Jim. In 1955, Williamston High won the North Carolina Class A state championship, as the Perry brothers threw back-to-back shutouts to sweep the best-of-three finals. Perry had a 33–5 win–loss record in his high school career.

As a teenager, Perry played semi-professional baseball for the Alpine Cowboys in Alpine, Texas. Perry and his brother both attended Campbell University, where they played college baseball.

== Pitching style ==
Perry said he was taught the spitball in 1964 by pitcher Bob Shaw. Perry had a reputation throughout his career for doctoring baseballs, and was inspected on the mound by umpires and monitored closely by opposing teams. During a game on April 6, 1974, for Cleveland against New York, Perry threw a pitch that umpire Marty Springstead signaled to be illegal as the "first victim of baseball's new enforcement" of the spitball rule. On August 23, 1982, he was ejected from a game, for the first and only time of his career, for doctoring the ball. Though umpire Dave Phillips ejected him from the game against the Boston Red Sox without inspecting the ball, Perry was still suspended for 10 days.

Perry reportedly approached the makers of Vaseline about endorsing the product and was allegedly rebuffed with a one-line postcard reading, "We soothe babies' backsides, not baseballs." Former manager Gene Mauch famously quipped "He should be in the Hall of Fame with a tube of K-Y Jelly attached to his plaque."

Gene Tenace, who caught Perry when they played for the San Diego Padres, said: "I can remember a couple of occasions when I couldn't throw the ball back to him because it was so greasy that it slipped out of my hands. I just walked out to the mound and flipped the ball back to him."

Perry used his reputation to psych out the hitters too. As he looked in to his catcher for the pitch selection, Perry would touch various parts of his head, such as his eyebrows and his cap. In this manner, he may or may not have been applying a foreign substance to the ball on any particular pitch. Reggie Jackson was so upset after striking out against Perry in a 1982 game that Jackson was ejected from the game. Jackson returned from the dugout with a container of Gatorade, splashing Gatorade onto the field while yelling at the umpire that Perry should be allowed to use the Gatorade on the baseball.

The spitball was not his only method for upsetting batters. Sportswriter Joe Posnanski described Perry's "Puffball," writing that Perry "would load up on the resin bag and so when he threw the pitch, this big puff of resin smoke would form and the hitter would have a hard time even finding the ball, much less hitting it. The puff ball was outlawed in 1981 strictly because of Perry."

== Professional career ==
=== Minor leagues ===
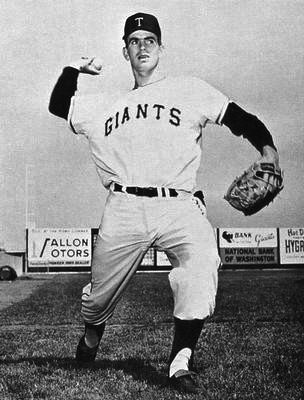
Perry as a member of the Tacoma Giants in 1961

The San Francisco Giants signed Perry on June 3, 1958, and he received a $90,000 signing bonus. He made his professional debut in the 1958 season with the St. Cloud Rox team in the Class A level Northern League, compiling a 9–5 record and a 2.39 earned run average (ERA) in 17 games (15 starts).

In 1959, the Giants promoted Perry to the Double-A Corpus Christi Giants, where he posted a 10–11 record and 4.05 ERA in 41 games (26 starts). He remained with the franchise as they became the Rio Grande Valley Giants in the 1960 season, and he finished with a 9–13 record and an improved ERA of 2.82 in 32 games (23 starts). His performance earned him a promotion to the Triple-A Tacoma Giants for the 1961 season. At Tacoma, Perry led the Pacific Coast League in wins (16) and innings pitched (219) in 1961.

=== San Francisco Giants (1962–1971) ===
Perry made his major league debut with the Giants on April 14, 1962, against the Cincinnati Reds. He allowed four earned runs on five hits in 2 2/3 innings, picking up a no-decision. He appeared in 13 games (seven starts) for the Giants but had a 3–1 record and a 5.23 ERA and was sent back down to Tacoma in June, where he went on to lead the PCL with a 2.44 ERA. Perry was promoted back to the Giants in September, but was not on the roster for the team's World Series appearance; it would be the only time in his career that he pitched for a pennant winner.

After his brief call-up in 1962, Perry joined the Giants in 1963 to work mostly as a relief pitcher, going 1–6 with a 4.03 ERA in 31 appearances (four starts). Nevertheless, he was given the opportunity to join the starting rotation in 1964. In 44 games (19 starts), Perry finished with a 2.75 ERA and a 12–11 record, both second-best for the Giants that year behind Juan Marichal. In 1965, his record was 8–12, and with two full seasons as a starter, his 24–30 record attracted little national attention.

Perry's breakout season came in 1966 with a tremendous start, going 20–2 into August. Perry and Marichal became known as a "1–2 punch" to rival the famous Koufax/Drysdale combination of the Los Angeles Dodgers. While Marichal was National League (NL) Player of the Month in May, Perry was so named in June (5–0, 0.90 ERA, 31 strikeouts). Perry played in his first All-Star Game, but after August, he slumped the rest of the season, finishing 21–8, and the Giants finished second to the Dodgers. Marichal missed much of the 1967 season with a leg injury, and Perry was thrust into the role of team ace. While he finished the season with a disappointing 15–17 record, he posted a 2.61 ERA and allowed only 7.1 hits per nine innings pitched in 39 games (37 starts).

Perry had similar numbers in 1968: he posted a 16–15 record, but with a then-career-best 2.45 ERA in 39 games (38 starts), helping the Giants to a second-place finish behind the St. Louis Cardinals. On September 17, two days after his 30th birthday, Perry threw a 1–0 no-hitter against the Cardinals and Bob Gibson at Candlestick Park. The lone run came on a first-inning home run by light-hitting Ron Hunt—the second of the only two he hit that season. The next day, Ray Washburn of the Cardinals no-hit the Giants, winning 2–0, and marking the first time in major league history that back-to-back no-hitters had been pitched in the same series.

Like most pitchers, Perry was not renowned for his hitting ability, and in his sophomore season of 1963, his manager Alvin Dark is said to have joked, "There would be a man on the moon before Gaylord Perry would hit a home run." There are other variants on the story, but either way, on July 20, 1969, just an hour after the Apollo 11 spacecraft carrying Neil Armstrong and Buzz Aldrin landed on the Moon, Perry hit the first home run of his career.

In 1969, Perry led the league in innings pitched, but the Giants finished second in the pennant race for the fifth straight season. Perry took over as the Giants' ace in 1970, and led the league both in wins (23) and innings pitched (328 2/3). Perry's strong 1970 performance salvaged the Giants' season, helping them finish above .500 but in third place. In 1971, the Giants finally won their division, with Perry posting a 16–12 record and 2.76 ERA in 37 starts. In what would be his only trip to the postseason, Perry won Game 1 of the NL Championship Series but lost the decisive Game 4 against the Pittsburgh Pirates.

=== Cleveland Indians (1972–1975) ===
On November 29, 1971, the Giants traded Perry, then 33 years old, and shortstop Frank Duffy to the Cleveland Indians for 29-year-old flamethrower Sam McDowell, the ace of the Indians' staff. Perry went 24–16 in 1972 with a 1.92 ERA and one save in 41 games (40 starts), winning his first Cy Young Award. He remained the only Cy Young winner for Cleveland until CC Sabathia in 2007.

By the 1973 season, Perry was widely suspected of throwing a spitball. That season, Bobby Murcer of the New York Yankees publicly criticized Bowie Kuhn, the Commissioner of Baseball, and Joe Cronin, the president of the American League (AL), for lacking the "guts" to enforce Rule 8.02, which banned the spitball; in response, Kuhn fined Murcer $250 (equivalent to $1,813 today). After losing a game to Perry, Billy Martin, manager of the Detroit Tigers, told reporters that he instructed his pitchers to throw a spitball, leading to Cronin suspending Martin for three games. Publicly, Perry insisted that the pitch was a "hard slider".

After the 1973 season, Perry approached Bob Sudyk, sportswriter for the Cleveland Press, about co-authoring an autobiography. Sudyk said that Perry would have to be willing to discuss the rumors that he threw a spitball, and Perry agreed. Phil Seghi, the general manager of the Indians, tried to dissuade Perry from sharing his secrets, but was unsuccessful. Perry showed Sudyk how he threw spitballs with substances like Vaseline and K-Y Jelly, and a "puffball" using rosin dust. Perry also showed Sudyk how he hid additives on his uniform and body. The book, titled Me and the Spitter, was released in 1974.

Before the 1974 season, MLB added to Rule 8.02, now nicknamed "Gaylord's Rule", allowing umpires to call an automatic ball if they suspected a spitball, and eject the pitcher on the second offense. During spring training, the Indians acquired Perry's brother Jim from the Tigers as part of a three-team trade including the Yankees. Gaylord was named AL Player of the Month in June 1974, after winning six complete games. In July, he started for the AL in the All-Star Game, the only time he started the game but had no decision in the AL's 7–2 loss. Perry won 21 games in 1974, and was Cleveland's last 20-game winner until Cliff Lee in 2008; his brother added 17 wins, with the pair accounting for half of the team's 77 victories.

Perry feuded with player-manager Frank Robinson after Robinson was acquired during the 1974 season. Perry told the press that he wanted to earn "one dollar more" than Robinson's $173,000 salary. They also feuded over Robinson's training regimen during spring training in 1975. Perry began the 1975 season with a 6–9 record and a 3.55 ERA in 15 starts through mid-June. In May, the Indians traded Jim Perry to the Oakland Athletics after he began the season with a 1–6 record and 6.69 ERA; it would turn out to be his final major league season.

=== Texas Rangers (1975–1977) ===
Perry with the Texas Rangers in 1977

On June 13, 1975, at the start of a three-game series with the Texas Rangers, the Indians traded Perry to the Rangers in exchange for pitchers Jim Bibby, Jackie Brown, and Rick Waits. Perry was 12–8 with a 3.03 ERA in 22 starts during the remainder of 1975.

In 1976, Perry had a 15–14 record and a 3.24 ERA in 32 starts. The Rangers protected Perry in the expansion draft after the season. In 1977, the Rangers surged to second place in the AL West. Perry again won 15 games, this time against only 12 defeats, in a rotation that included Doyle Alexander, Bert Blyleven, and Dock Ellis. On May 18, 1977, Perry became the third pitcher in major league history to win 100 games in both the AL and NL with a 6–3 victory for the Rangers against the Detroit Tigers that saw him retire the last 18 batters.

=== San Diego Padres (1978–79) ===
Before the 1978 season, the Rangers traded Perry to the San Diego Padres for middle reliever Dave Tomlin and $125,000. In the final game of the 1978 season, Perry recorded his 3,000th strikeout, becoming the third pitcher to do so after Walter Johnson and Bob Gibson. Perry won the Cy Young Award, going 21–6 with a 2.73 ERA in 37 starts for San Diego, becoming the first pitcher to win the Cy Young Award in both leagues.

In 1979, Perry posted a 12–11 record and a 3.05 ERA in 32 starts before quitting the team on September 5, saying he would retire unless the club traded him back to Texas. The Padres traded Perry to the Texas Rangers on February 15, 1980, with minor leaguers Tucker Ashford and Joe Carroll for first baseman Willie Montañez.

=== Texas Rangers / New York Yankees (1980) ===
In 1980, Perry posted a 6–9 record and 3.43 ERA in 24 starts with Texas before being traded to the Yankees on August 13, for minor leaguers Ken Clay and a player to be named later (Marvin Thompson). Many Yankees players had complained about Perry during his stints with the Rangers, and the club even used a special camera team to monitor his movements during one of his starts at Yankee Stadium. Perry finished the season with a 4–4 record with a 4.44 ERA in 10 games (eight starts) for the Yankees. He did not pitch in the team's trip to the AL Championship Series.

=== Atlanta Braves (1981) ===
Perry's contract was up after the 1980 season and he agreed to a one-year, $300,000 contract with the Atlanta Braves for the 1981 season on January 8. During the strike-shortened 1981 season, Perry, the oldest player at the time in MLB, started 23 games (150 2/3 innings) and had an 8–9 record with a 3.94 ERA. The Braves released Perry after the season, leaving him three victories short of 300.

=== Seattle Mariners / Kansas City Royals (1982–83) ===
After being released by the Braves, Perry was unable to find interest from any clubs during the offseason, and missed his first spring training in 23 years. On March 5, 1982, he signed a minor league contract with the Seattle Mariners, where he acquired the nickname "Ancient Mariner." Perry won his 300th game on May 6, becoming the first pitcher to win 300 games since Early Wynn did so in 1963. On August 23, he was ejected from a game against the Boston Red Sox for doctoring the ball, and given a ten-day suspension. It was the second time Perry had been ejected in his entire career, and it was his first ejection for ball doctoring.

After starting the 1983 season 3–10, Perry was designated for assignment by Seattle on June 26. The Kansas City Royals picked him on a waiver claim ten days later. In August, Perry became the third pitcher in history to record 3,500 strikeouts. In the final months of the season, Perry experimented with a submarine delivery for the first time in his career and took a no-hitter into the eighth inning against the first-place Baltimore Orioles on August 19.

In August 1983, Perry became the third pitcher in the same year to surpass long-time strikeout king Walter Johnson's record of 3,509 strikeouts. Steve Carlton and Nolan Ryan were the others. Also in 1983, Perry was involved in the Pine Tar Game against the New York Yankees. The game originally ended when the umpires called George Brett out for too much pine tar on his bat, negating his home run and drawing a vehement protest from him and the Royals. Perry absconded with Brett's bat and gave it to a bat boy so he could hide it in the clubhouse, only to be caught by umpire Joe Brinkman. When the Royals won the protest, Perry was retroactively ejected for doing this.

Perry announced his retirement on September 23, 1983, making him the final major leaguer born in the 1930s to do so. He finished his MLB career with 314 wins, a 3.11 ERA, and 3,534 strikeouts. He threw 303 complete games.

== Post-playing career ==
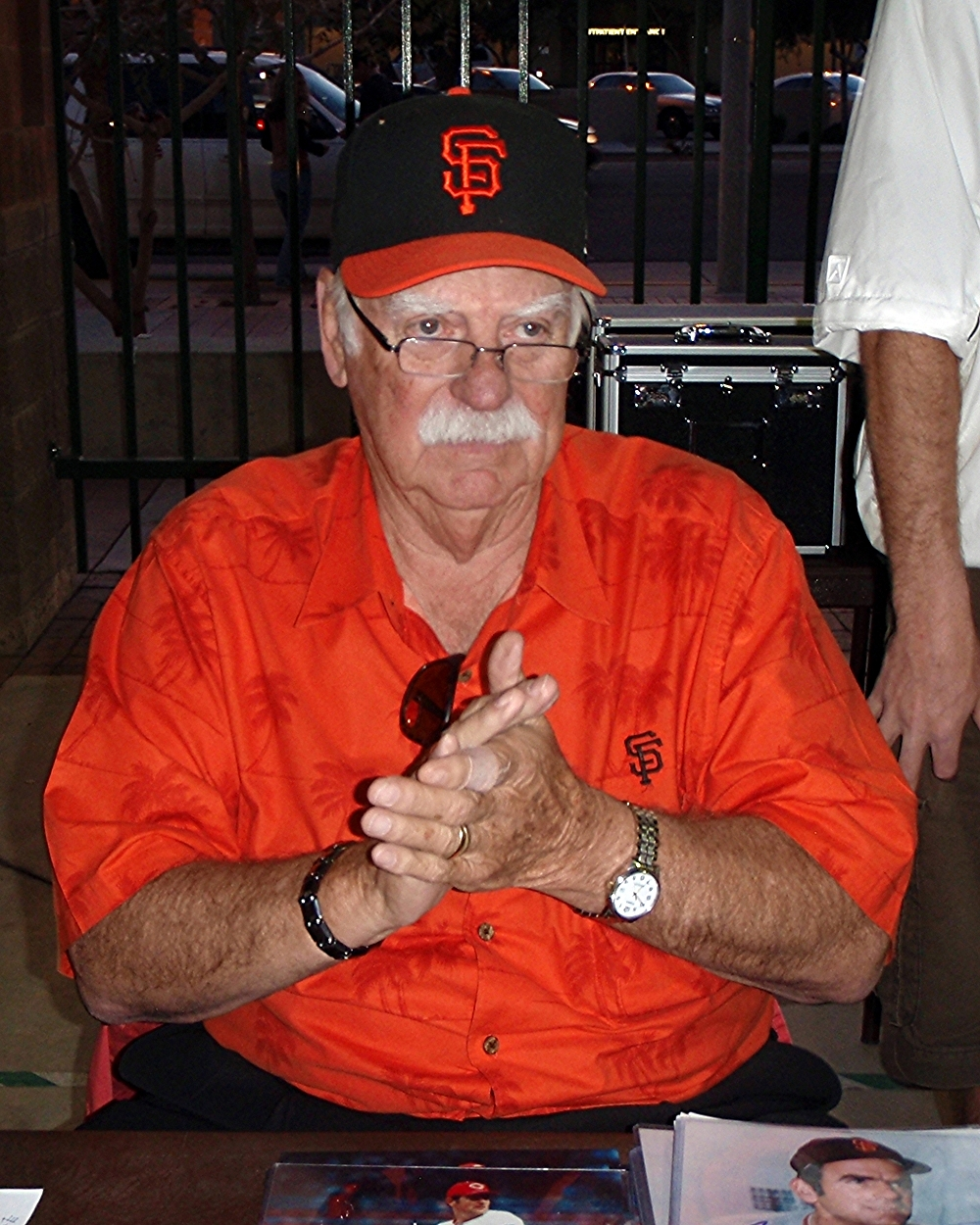
Perry in 2011

Perry retired to his 500-acre (2.0-square-kilometer) farm in Martin County, North Carolina, where he grew tobacco and peanuts, but he filed for bankruptcy in 1986. He briefly worked for Fiesta Foods as a sales manager. Later that year, Limestone College in Gaffney, South Carolina, chose Perry as the college's first baseball coach. Perry was there until 1991 when he retired. In 1998, Perry was inducted into the college's Athletics Hall of Fame. He later moved to Spruce Pine, North Carolina.

Perry supported the Republican Party. He campaigned for Jesse Helms and contemplated a bid for Congress himself in 1986.

== Honors ==
In 1991, his third year of eligibility, Perry was elected to the National Baseball Hall of Fame. In 1999, he was a finalist for the Major League Baseball All-Century Team. In 1998, The Sporting News ranked him 97th on their list of the 100 Greatest Baseball Players. Bill James listed Perry as having the tenth best career of any right-handed starting pitcher and the 50th greatest player at any position in 2001.

On July 23, 2005, the Giants retired Perry's uniform number 36. Perry was inducted into the Bay Area Sports Hall of Fame on March 9, 2009. Perry was honored on April 9, 2011, at AT&T Park with a 2010 World Series ring along with other San Francisco Giants greats Willie McCovey, Orlando Cepeda, and Willie Mays. He was honored again on April 7, 2013, with Mays and Juan Marichal receiving a 2012 World Series ring, and on April 18, 2015, with a 2014 World Series ring along with Mays, McCovey, Cepeda, and Marichal. The Indians invited Perry to throw the ceremonial first pitch before their Opening Day game for the 2015 season. On August 13, 2016, the Giants unveiled a bronze statue of Perry at the corner of Second and King streets outside of AT&T Park.

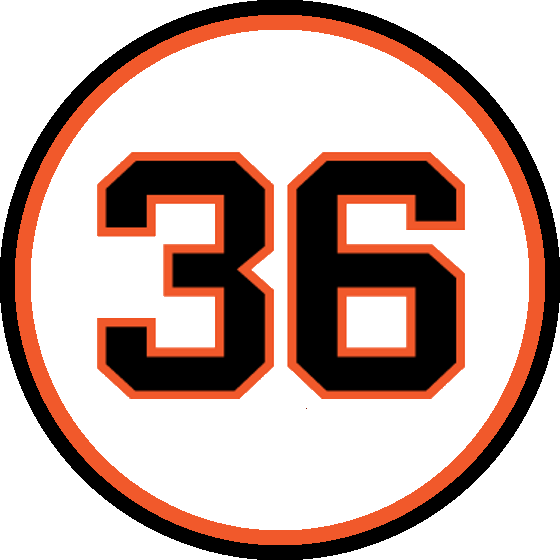
Gaylord Perry's number 36 was retired by the San Francisco Giants in 2005.

== Personal life ==
Perry's wife, Blanche Manning Perry, died on September 11, 1987, when a car ran a stop sign and hit her car broadside on U.S. Route 27 in Lake Wales, Florida. Perry and Blanche had three daughters and one son. Their son, Jack, died of leukemia on June 18, 2005. In 1988, Perry launched the baseball program at Limestone College (now Limestone University) in Gaffney, South Carolina, and his son Jack was an inaugural team member. Jack was an accomplished pitcher and was posthumously inducted into the Limestone University Athletics Hall of Fame in 2017. Jack pitched three seasons at Limestone under his father's coaching and is the only player in team history to throw a no-hitter—achieving a no-hitter twice within two weeks during the 1990 season. Perry's nephew, Chris, is a professional golfer on the PGA Tour.

Perry contracted COVID-19 in 2021 and never fully recovered. He died at home on December 1, 2022, at age 84.

== Publications ==
- Perry, Gaylord; Sudyk, Bob (1974). Me and the Spitter. New York: Saturday Review Press. ISBN 0-841-50299-4.

== See also ==
- 300 win club
- 3000 strikeout club
- List of Major League Baseball career wins leaders
- List of Major League Baseball no-hitters
- List of Major League Baseball annual wins leaders
- List of Texas Rangers Opening Day starting pitchers
- Top 100 Major League Baseball hit batsmen leaders
- Top 100 Major League Baseball strikeout pitchers

Awards and achievements
| Preceded by George Culver | No-hitter pitcher September 17, 1968 | Succeeded by Ray Washburn |
| Preceded by Juan Marichal | Major League Player of the Month; June 1966 | Succeeded by Mike Shannon |
