= Spitball =

Illegal baseball pitch

Gaylord Perry threw the spitball during his career.

A spitball is a now-illegal baseball pitch in which the ball has been altered by the application of a foreign substance such as saliva or petroleum jelly. This technique alters the wind resistance and weight on one side of the ball, causing it to move in an atypical manner. It may also cause the ball to "slip" out of the pitcher's fingers without the usual spin that accompanies a pitch. In this sense, a spitball can be thought of as a fastball with knuckleball action. Alternative names for the spitball are spitter, mud ball, shine ball, supersinker, or vaseline ball (because originally, Vaseline was used to give the ball a little more break). A spitball technically differs from an emery ball, in which the surface of the ball is cut or abraded. Saliva or Vaseline smooths the baseball, while the emery paper roughens it. The general term for altering the ball in any way is doctoring.

== History ==
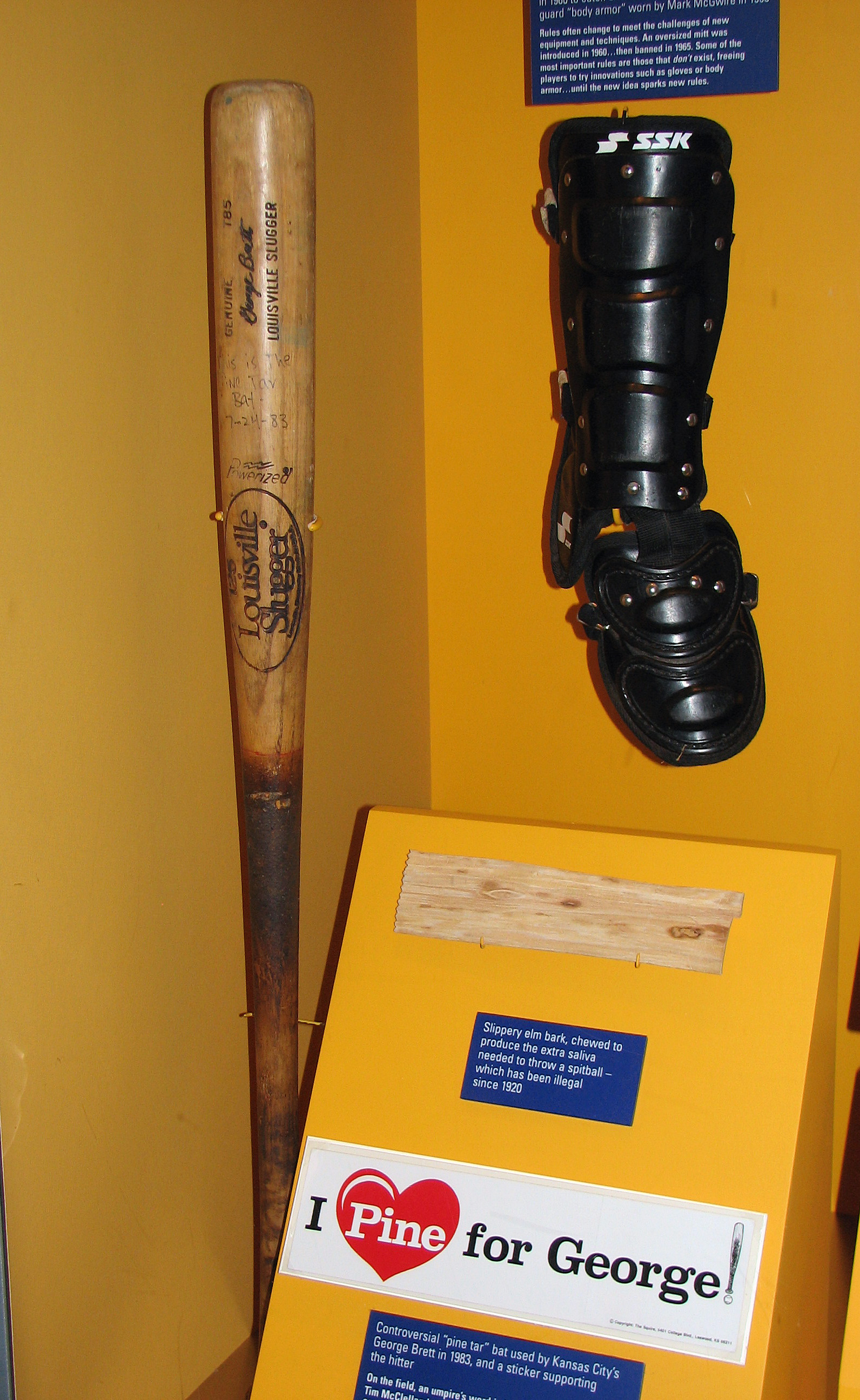
Slippery elm bark, chewed to produce the extra saliva needed to throw a spitball

The invention of the spitball has been popularly credited to a number of individuals, among them Elmer Stricklett and Frank Corridon. Numerous accounts, however, refer to different players experimenting with versions of the spitball throughout the latter half of the 19th century, and it remains unlikely that any one individual "invented" the spitball.

Ed Walsh, however, is widely recognized as the player responsible for popularizing it. Walsh dominated the American League from 1906 to 1912, primarily on the strength of his spitball, and pitchers around the league soon copied his spitball or invented their own trick pitch.

The dramatic increase in the popularity of "freak deliveries" led to a great deal of controversy throughout the 1910s regarding the abolition of the spitball and related pitches. In his autobiography, Ty Cobb wrote that such "freak pitches [...] were outlawed when the owners greedily sold out to home runs."

In addition, there were serious issues with the spitball, including some that affected safety. A variation on the standard spitball called for the pitcher to smear the entire surface of the normally white ball with a mixture of tobacco spittle and dirt or mud in order to stain it the same deep brown color as the infield which made it nearly impossible for batters to see (and sometimes avoid) in low-light conditions. In August 1920, Ray Chapman was killed when he was struck in the temple by a pitch thrown by known spitball pitcher Carl Mays during a poorly lit game.

== Ban ==
In Major League Baseball (MLB), the spitball was banned in two stages. In the winter of 1919–1920, managers voted to partially ban the spitball. Each team was allowed to designate up to two pitchers who would be permitted to throw spitballs. After the 1920 season, the use of the spitball was banned with the exception of a group of 17 existing spitballers, who became legacy spitballers who were allowed to throw the pitch legally until they retired.

Of the exempted group, Burleigh Grimes lasted the longest, retiring in 1934. The complete list of exempted spitballers is: Ray Fisher (played through 1920); Doc Ayers (1921); Ray Caldwell (1921); Phil Douglas (1922); Dana Fillingim (1925); Marv Goodwin (1925); Dutch Leonard (1925); Allen Russell (1925); Allen Sothoron (1926); Dick Rudolph (1927); Stan Coveleski (1928); Urban Shocker (1928); Bill Doak (1929); Clarence Mitchell (1932); Red Faber (1933); Jack Quinn (1933); and Grimes.

In March 1955, MLB Commissioner Ford Frick advocated for the return of the spitball, telling a sportswriter, "If I had my way, I'd legalize the old spitter. It was a great pitch and one of the easiest to throw. There was nothing dangerous about it." Despite the Commissioner's enthusiasm, the pitch remained illegal.

== Methodology ==
The spitball is now banned in Major League baseball. It is a pitching violation in NCAA Baseball. However, it is still sometimes thrown in violation of the rules. In 1942, Leo Durocher, then-manager of the Brooklyn Dodgers, fined Bobo Newsom for throwing a spitball and "lying to me about it." Typically, a lubricant is hidden behind the pitcher's knee or under the peak of his cap. Others will place the ball in their mitt and then cough on or lick it. Another tactic pitchers use is to soak their hair in water before going out to the mound, and then rub their hair before a pitch.

Preacher Roe, who played for the Brooklyn Dodgers in the 1950s, was renowned both for his ability to control the spitball and to throw it without getting caught and described his methodology in a 1955 article in Sports Illustrated. "The Outlawed Spitball Was My Money Pitch" was published a year after he retired. Another famous user of the pitch was Gaylord Perry, who went so far as to title his autobiography Me and the Spitter and chronicled the clever ways in which he avoided detection. For example, Perry would put Vaseline on his zipper because umpires would never check a player's groin. Don Drysdale also used the pitch regularly, as did Lew Burdette. Drysdale would apply oil to the back of his hair to put on the ball to make it sink. Mike Fiers has been accused of doctoring the baseball during both his no-hitters.

== Legal spits ==
The name dry spitter is sometimes used to describe a pitch that moves like a spitball without saliva, such as the forkball or split-finger fastball. It is sometimes used simply as slang for the knuckleball.

There is also the remote term of God-given spitter, which is when the ball is naturally dampened by moist air or light rainfall, which allows pitchers to be able to throw pitches with sharper breaks, much like a spitball.

== See also ==
- 2021 sticky stuff controversy
- Ball tampering in cricket
- Cheating in baseball
- Live-ball era and dead-ball era
