= Steve Carlton =

American baseball player (born 1944)

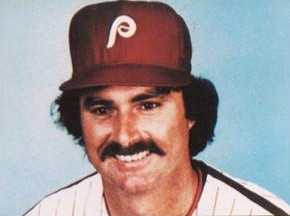
- Carlton with the Philadelphia Phillies in 1983
- Pitcher
- Born: December 22, 1944 (age 81); Miami, Florida, U.S.
- Batted: Left Threw: Left

MLB debut
- April 12, 1965, for the St. Louis Cardinals

Last MLB appearance
- April 23, 1988, for the Minnesota Twins

MLB statistics
- Win–loss record: 329–244
- Earned run average: 3.22
- Strikeouts: 4,136
- Stats at Baseball Reference

Teams
- St. Louis Cardinals (1965–1971); Philadelphia Phillies (1972–1986); San Francisco Giants (1986); Chicago White Sox (1986); Cleveland Indians (1987); Minnesota Twins (1987–1988)

Career highlights and awards
- 10× All-Star (1968, 1969, 1971, 1972, 1974, 1977, 1979–1982); 2× World Series champion (1967, 1980); 4× NL Cy Young Award (1972, 1977, 1980, 1982); Triple Crown (1972); Gold Glove Award (1981); 4× NL wins leader (1972, 1977, 1980, 1982); NL ERA leader (1972); 5× NL strikeout leader (1972, 1974, 1980, 1982, 1983); Philadelphia Phillies No. 32 retired; Philadelphia Phillies Wall of Fame

Member of the National

Baseball Hall of Fame
- Induction: 1994
- Vote: 95.6% (first ballot)

Steven Norman Carlton (born December 22, 1944) is an American former professional baseball player. He played in Major League Baseball (MLB) as a left-handed pitcher for six different teams from 1965 to 1988, most notably as a member of the Philadelphia Phillies with whom he won four Cy Young Awards as well as the 1980 World Series. He was elected to the Baseball Hall of Fame in 1994 in his first year of eligibility.

Nicknamed "Lefty", Carlton has the second-most lifetime strikeouts of any left-handed pitcher (4th overall), and the second-most lifetime wins of any left-handed pitcher (11th overall). He was the first pitcher to win four Cy Young Awards in a career. He held the lifetime strikeout record several times between 1982 and 1984, before his contemporary Nolan Ryan passed him. One of his most remarkable records was accounting for nearly half (46%) of his team's wins, when he won 27 games for the last-place (59–97) 1972 Phillies. He is the last National League pitcher to win 25 or more games in one season, as well as the last pitcher from any team to throw more than 300 innings in a season. He also holds the record for the most career balks of any pitcher, with 90 (double the second on the all-time list, Bob Welch).

== Early years ==
Carlton was born and raised in Miami, Florida, where he played Little League and American Legion Baseball during his youth. Steve was the only son of Joe and Anne Carlton and was raised with his sisters Joanne and Christina on 144th Street in Miami. Joe Carlton was an airline maintenance worker.

As a teenager, Carlton began reading and following the teachings of Eastern philosophy and Paramahansa Yogananda, who promoted greatness through meditation.

He attended North Miami High School, playing baseball and basketball at first. Carlton had no plans beyond high school and showed little interest in his studies. As a senior, Carlton quit basketball to concentrate on pitching. He was teammates in high school with Kurt Bevacqua, and his teammate Richie Mehlich defeated Charlie Hough 1–0 in the playoffs under coach Jack Clark; Mehlich was later the victim of murder.

After high school, Carlton played baseball at Miami Dade College North, where he pitched in relief on a strong team under coach Demie Mainieri.

In 1963, while a student at Miami-Dade, he signed with the St. Louis Cardinals for a $5,000 bonus. (Note: $5,000 in 1963 is equivalent to $38,556.97 in 2014 dollars.)

== Minor leagues ==
In 1964, Carlton pitched for four teams as he quickly advanced through the Cardinals minor league system. He pitched for the Cardinals team in the Florida East Coast Instructional League going 2–3 with a 2.89 ERA; in 12 starts with the Winnipeg Goldeyes of the Class A Northern League he was 4–4 with a 3.36 ERA; with the Rock Hill Cardinals of the Class A Western Carolinas League he was 10–1 with a 1.03 ERA in 11 starts, earning a promotion to Class AA Tulsa. Carlton concluded 1964 with the Tulsa Oilers of the Texas League, going 1–1 with a 2.63 ERA in four games. Overall, Carlton was 15–6 with a 2.22 ERA and 191 strikeouts in 178 innings in 1964.

In 1965, Carlton pitched one game and 5 innings of one-run ball with the Cardinals team in the Florida East Coast Instructional League and was promoted to the major league team.

In 1966, Carlton started 19 games with the now Class AAA Tulsa Oilers of the Pacific Coast League, going 9–5 with a 3.59 ERA.

== Major league career (1965–1988) ==
=== St. Louis Cardinals (1965–1971) ===
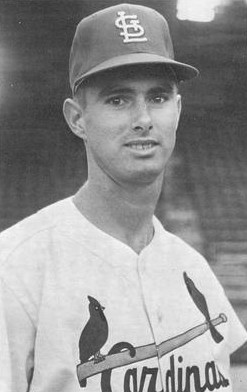
Carlton with the Cardinals in 1965

Carlton debuted with the St. Louis Cardinals as a 20–year-old in 1965 and by 1967 was a regular in the Cardinals rotation. An imposing man (6 feet 4 inches (1.93 m)) with a hard fastball and slider, Carlton was soon known as an intimidating and dominant pitcher. Carlton enjoyed immediate success in St. Louis, posting winning records and reaching the World Series in 1967 and 1968. In 1967, Carlton was 14–9 with a 2.98 ERA in 28 starts. In 1968, he was 13–11 with a 2.99 ERA. On September 15, 1969, Carlton struck out 19 New York Mets, while losing to the Mets, 4–3, setting the modern-day record at that time for strikeouts in a nine-inning game. He finished 1969 with a 17–11 record, a 2.17 ERA, second-lowest in the NL, and 210 strikeouts.

In the 1967 World Series, Carlton started Game 5 and pitched six strong innings, giving up only an unearned run, but taking a 3–1 loss. The Cardinals beat the Boston Red Sox to capture the World Series.

In the 1968 World Series, Carlton pitched in two games in relief, giving up three runs over four innings as the Cardinals lost to the Detroit Tigers in seven games.

A contract dispute with the Cardinals (he had made $26,000 in 1969 and was holding out for $50,000, as opposed to the Cardinals' contract offer for $31,000) (Note: If adjusted for inflation, these amounts would be equivalent to $167,000, $304,000, and $189,000, respectively, in 2014 dollars.) made Carlton a no-show at spring training in 1970. He proceeded to go 10–19 with a 3.73 ERA, leading the NL in losses. In 1971, Carlton rebounded, going 20–9 with a 3.56 ERA, his first of six 20–win seasons.

Following another salary dispute, Cardinals owner Gussie Busch ordered Carlton traded. The Cardinals were offering $55,000 and Carlton wanted $10,000 more. He was traded to the Philadelphia Phillies on February 26, 1972, just before the 1972 season for pitcher Rick Wise. At the time, the trade appeared to make sense from the Cardinals' perspective. Carlton had won 77 games to Wise's 75, and both were considered among the game's best pitchers. Tim McCarver, who had caught for Carlton in St. Louis and for Wise in Philadelphia (and who would later become Carlton's personal catcher again with the Phillies), described the trade at the time as "a real good one for a real good one". He felt Carlton had more raw talent, but Wise had better command on the mound. Moreover, Busch's order to unload Carlton was an open secret across baseball. With potential partners driving very hard bargains, the Phillies' offer of Wise was the best St. Louis could do.

While Wise pitched in the majors for another 11 years (he pitched two seasons with the Cardinals before being traded to Boston), he only won 188 career games compared to Carlton's 329. Partly because of this, the trade is considered one of the worst trades in Cardinals history, and one of the most lopsided trades in all of baseball history.

Carlton was 77–62 with a 3.10 ERA in 190 games and 172 starts with the Cardinals over parts of seven seasons, with 66 complete games and 16 shutouts. He was selected to the NL All-Star team in 1968, 1969 and 1971.

=== Philadelphia Phillies (1972–1986) ===
In Carlton's first season with Philadelphia, he led the league in wins (27), complete games (30), strikeouts (310), and ERA (1.97), despite playing for a team whose final record was 59–97. His 1972 performance earned him his first Cy Young Award and the Hickok Belt as the top professional athlete of the year. He became the first pitcher on a last-place team to win the Cy Young Award, and his winning percentage of 46% of his team's victories that season is a record in modern major league history. Carlton attributed his success to his grueling training regimen, which included Eastern martial arts techniques, the most famous of which was twisting his fist to the bottom of a 5-gallon bucket of rice.

Some highlights of Carlton's 1972 season included starting the season with five wins and one loss, then losing five games in a row, during which period the Phillies scored only 10 runs. At this point he began a 15–game winning streak. After it ended at a 20–6 record, he finished the final third of the year with seven more wins and four losses, ending with 27 wins and 10 losses. Carlton also completed 30 of 41 starts.

During the 18 games of the winning streak (three were no-decisions), Carlton pitched 155 innings, allowed 103 hits and 28 runs (only 17 in the 15 winning games), allowed 39 walks, and had 140 strikeouts. From July 23, 1972, to August 13, 1972, he pitched five complete-game victories, allowed only one unearned run while only giving up 22 hits in 45 innings, and threw four shutouts. Baseball commentators during 1972 regularly remarked that Carlton's slider was basically unhittable.

"Auggie Busch traded me to the last-place Phillies over a salary dispute," reflected Carlton on his 1972 season. "I was mentally committed to winning 25 games with the Cardinals and now I had to re-think my goals. I decided to stay with the 25-win goal and won 27 of the Phillies' 59 victories. I consider that season my finest individual achievement."

==== Media silence ====
When Carlton slumped in 1973, finishing 13–20 with a 3.90 ERA, the media's questioning of his unusual training techniques led to an acrimonious relationship between them and Carlton. In 1976, upon the advice of his lawyer Edward L. Wolf, he decided to sever all ties with the media, and refused to answer press questions for the rest of his career with the Phillies. When approached unbeknownst he was on live air in the early 1980s he hurled a sponsor's watch at the commentator's head in the pregame show. This reached a point where, in 1981, while the Mexican rookie Fernando Valenzuela was achieving stardom with the Los Angeles Dodgers, a reporter remarked, "The two best pitchers in the National League don't speak English: Fernando Valenzuela and Steve Carlton."

"One thing I regret is that Philadelphia fans didn't see the same Steve Carlton we saw in our clubhouse," longtime Phillies teammate Larry Bowa said of Carlton's media silence. "He put up a mask when the writers came in. He was very consistent with the writers. He didn't talk to any of them."

Carlton reflected on his longtime media silence, saying: "It (not talking to the media from 1974 through the end of his career) was perfect for me at the time. It took me two years to make up my mind. I was tired of getting slammed. To me it was a slap in the face. But it (his silence) made me concentrate better. And the irony is that they wrote better without access to my quotes. It's all quotes, anyway, and it all sounds the same to me. After that they wrote better and more interesting stuff. I took it personal. I got slammed quite a bit. To pick up the paper and read about yourself getting slammed, that doesn't start your day off right."

==== More success ====
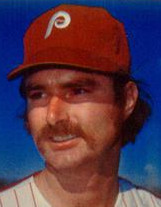
Carlton in 1977

Carlton continued to enjoy many years of success with the Phillies, winning the Cy Young Award in 1972, 1977, 1980, and 1982, and pitching the Phillies to the best string of post-season appearances in club history. Carlton was the first pitcher to win four Cy Young Awards, a mark later matched by Greg Maddux, and exceeded by Roger Clemens and Randy Johnson. His Cy Young Award in 1972 was by unanimous vote, and he finished fifth in balloting for the National League MVP. Gradually the Phillies improved their team, and won the National League East Division three consecutive times from 1976 to 1978.

In 1980, Carlton led the National League in victories (24), strikeouts (286) and innings pitched (304) to help the Phillies win the 1980 World Series, their first title; he won the series' final game and was 2–0 with a 2.40 ERA with 17 strikeouts in 15 innings in his two starts against the Kansas City Royals. Carlton is the last major league pitcher to have 300 innings pitched in a season.

Carlton won a Gold Glove Award for his fielding in 1981. On September 13, 1982, for the fourth time in his career, Carlton hit a home run and tossed a complete-game shutout in the same game. He is the only pitcher to have done so in three different decades.

He helped the Phillies to another pennant in 1983, finishing 15–16 with a 3.11 ERA in 37 starts. but they lost to the Baltimore Orioles in the World Series. Carlton was 2–0 with a 0.66 ERA against the Los Angeles Dodgers in the NLCS, allowing 1 run in 13 innings with 13 strikeouts. In the 1983 World Series, Carlton was matched up against Jim Palmer in Game 3, where he gave up 2 earned runs in 6 2/3 innings of a 3–2 loss. The Phillies lost the series in five games.

On September 23, 1983, in a game against his former team, the St. Louis Cardinals, Carlton won the 300th game of his career, becoming the 16th pitcher to accomplish the feat.

==== Race for the all–time strikeout record ====
Over a three-year period between 1982–1984, Carlton was involved in an interesting pitching duel with Nolan Ryan and Gaylord Perry, in which they often traded places at the top of the all–time strikeout list. At the start of the 1983 season, the 55-year-old mark of Walter Johnson was 3,508 strikeouts, but there were three pitchers who were within 100 strikeouts of Johnson: Ryan (3,494), Perry (3,452), and Carlton (3,434). Ryan was the first to surpass Johnson on April 22, 1983 against the Montreal Expos. However a stint on the disabled list shortly after he set the record, combined with a spectacular season by Carlton, allowed Carlton to make up ground and on June 7, 1983, Carlton passed Ryan as the all-time strikeout king with 3,526 to Ryan's 3,524. There were 14 lead changes and one tie that season, often after each of their respective starts, before the season ended with Carlton leading 3,709 to 3,677. Perry, aging and in his final season, passed Johnson later to finish his career with 3,534 strikeouts. Since then, five other pitchers have surpassed Johnson's mark and Johnson has fallen to ninth place on the all-time strikeout list.

There were five more lead changes and a tie in 1984 before Carlton ran out of gas. His last-ever lead in the all-time strikeout race was after his start on September 4, 1984, when he struck out four Cubs to lead Ryan by three (3,857 to 3,854). Although the season ended with a mere two-strikeout lead for Ryan (3,874 to 3,872), Carlton had an injury-riddled season in 1985 and an even worse season in 1986 before being released by the Phillies just 18 strikeouts short of 4,000.

On his longtime Phillies teammate Mike Schmidt, Carlton said, "Schmitty provided what pitchers need most, home runs and great defense. He's the best third baseman that I ever played with, and maybe of all-time. Obvious Hall of Famer, even then. He retired while on top of his game. I thought for sure he was going to hit 600 home runs."

In 15 seasons with the Phillies, Carlton was 241–161 with a 3.09 ERA. He started 499 games with 185 complete games, 39 shutouts and 3,031 strikeouts against 1,252 walks in 3,697 innings. He was a seven-time All-Star with the Phillies and won the NL Cy Young Award four times: in 1972, 1977, 1980 and 1982.

=== San Francisco Giants (1986) ===
After being released by the Phillies, Carlton joined the San Francisco Giants; he also briefly broke his self-imposed boycott of the media to give a press conference after signing with the Giants. Carlton pitched seven shutout innings in a game against the Pittsburgh Pirates, in which he also hit a three-run homer, for his only win as a Giant. Overall, Carlton went 1–3 with a 5.10 ERA in six games for the Giants.

==== 4,000th strikeout ====
Carlton collected his 4,000th career strikeout, striking out Eric Davis in an 11–6 Giants loss to the Reds in San Francisco on August 5, 1986. He became just the second pitcher to reach the 4,000 strikeout mark, after Nolan Ryan. Two days after the milestone, Carlton announced his retirement on August 7, 1986. "Upon reflection, I realized that I've reached a career milestone never before accomplished by a pitcher spending his entire career in one league," Carlton said in a statement. "I realize that the San Francisco Giants are committed to the younger players in their organization, specifically the talented young men on their pitching staff."

=== Chicago White Sox (1986) ===
Carlton's retirement was brief; he had not submitted paperwork for the voluntary retired list nor did he submit a letter of retirement to the National League. Carlton subsequently signed with the Chicago White Sox for the remainder of the 1986 season on August 11, 1986. With the White Sox, Carlton went 4–3 with a 3.69 ERA.

Overall, Carlton's 1986 numbers (with three teams) were a 9–14 win–loss record, with a 5.10 ERA.

=== Cleveland Indians (1987) ===
In 1987, Carlton joined the Cleveland Indians. There he became teammates with contemporary Phil Niekro. In a game against the New York Yankees at Yankee Stadium, they became the first teammates and 300-game winners to appear in the same game, a 10–6 Yankee victory. It was Carlton's only pitching appearance in Yankee Stadium, having spent the majority of his career in the National League before the inception of interleague play. (He was selected to the 1977 National League All-Star team which was held in Yankee Stadium, but he did not appear in the game.)

=== Minnesota Twins (1987–1988) ===
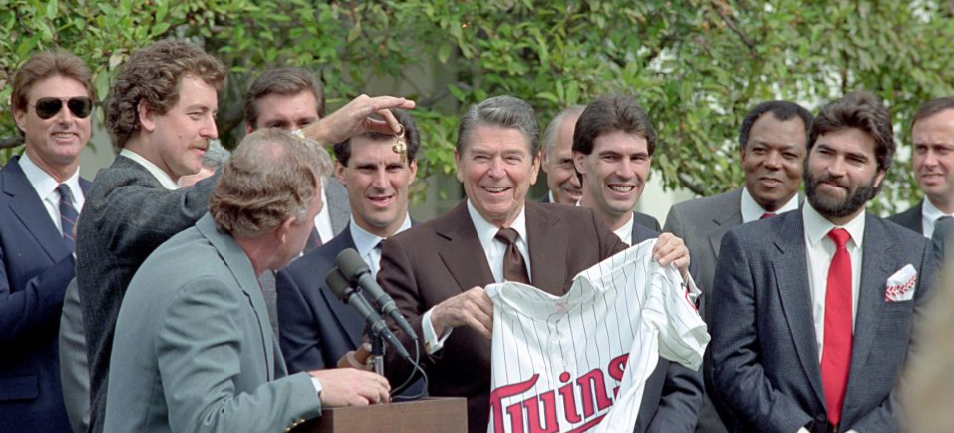
Carlton (far left) with the Twins and Ronald Reagan at the White House

Carlton was traded to the Minnesota Twins in late July 1987. He went a combined 6–14 with a 5.74 ERA for both the Indians and Twins. The Twins won the 1987 World Series, albeit without Carlton on the postseason roster, to earn him a third World Series ring. Carlton made the trip to the White House to meet President Reagan along with his Twins teammates. When Carlton was photographed with his teammates at the White House, newspapers listed each member of the team with the notable exception of Carlton. Instead, Carlton was listed as an "unidentified Secret Service agent."

He made the Twins roster in 1988, pitching in four games (0–1 with a 16.76 ERA), before being released by the Twins on April 23, 1988, after surrendering eight runs in five innings in what would be his final meaningful appearance. No teams signed Carlton for the remainder of the 1988 season.

=== Retirement ===
Carlton remained unsigned in 1989. The New York Yankees offered him the use of their facilities for training purposes, but guaranteed no spot in spring training. Carlton subsequently retired at age 44.

Nolan Ryan pitched until 1993 and extended his strikeout lead over Carlton to almost 1,600 before retiring. Carlton eventually fell to third and then fourth place on the all–time strikeout list after Roger Clemens and Randy Johnson passed him.

== Career statistics ==
Carlton was an accomplished hitter for a pitcher. In his career, he hit .201 with 13 home runs, 123 runs and 140 RBIs in 1,710 career at-bats. In the postseason, Carlton hit .222 overall, with a home run in the 1978 National League Championship Series. Defensively, he recorded a .952 fielding percentage, which was the league average at his position.

W	L	PCT	ERA	G	GS	CG	SHO	SV	IP	H	ER	R	HR	BB	SO	WP	HBP
329	244	.574	3.22	741	709	254	55	2	5217.2	4672	1864	2130	414	1833	4136	183	53

== Legacy ==
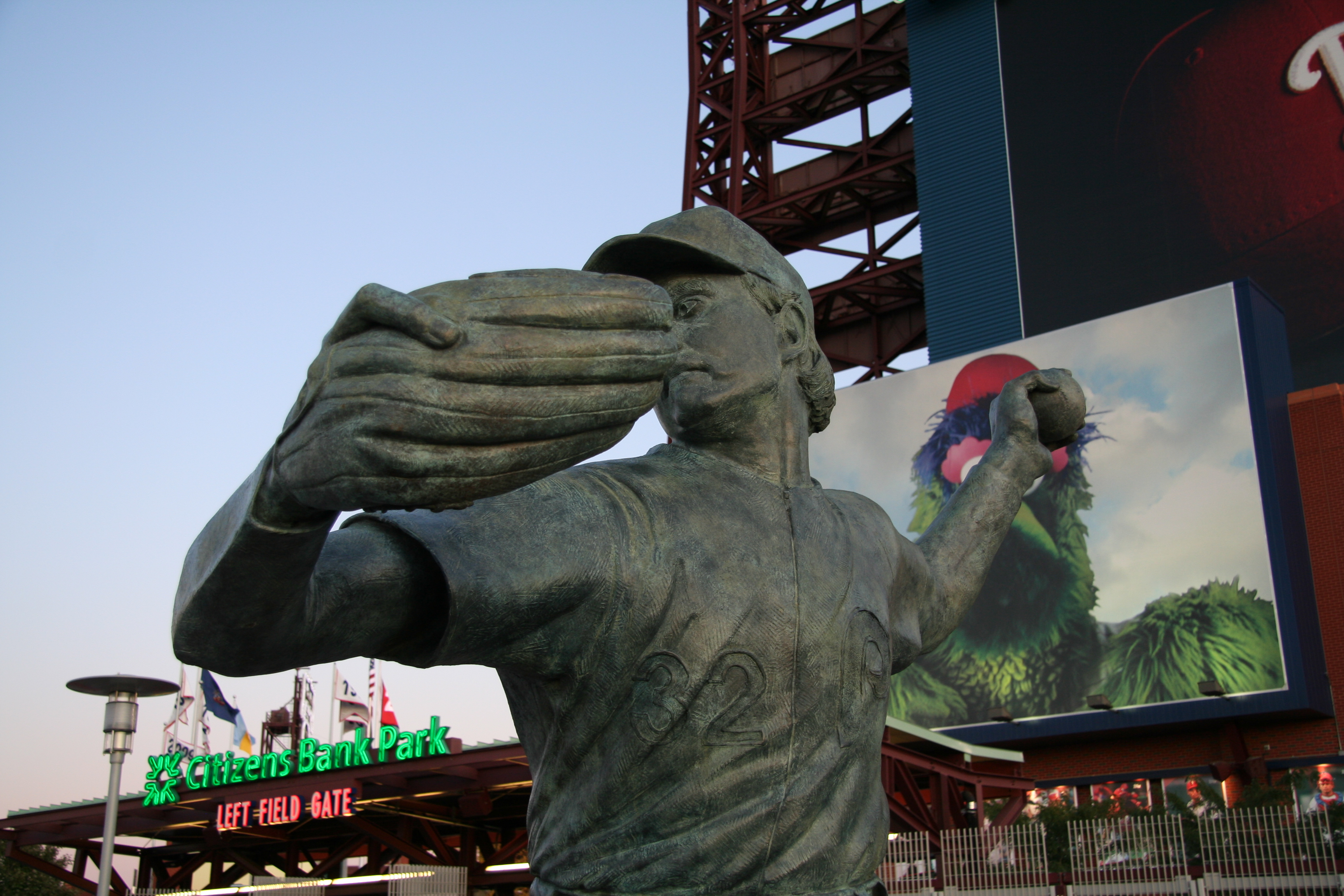
A statue of Carlton outside of Citizens Bank Park

A ten-time All-Star, Carlton led the league in many pitching categories. He struck out 4,136 batters in his career, setting a record for a left-handed pitcher (since surpassed by Randy Johnson), and holds many other records for both left-handed and Phillies pitchers. His 329 career wins are the eleventh most in baseball history, behind Greg Maddux, Roger Clemens, and Warren Spahn among pitchers of the live-ball era (post 1920). He is also second (behind Bob Gibson) in major league history for the most consecutive starts with at least six innings pitched (69), which was snapped in April 1982.

Steve Carlton's number 32 was retired by the Philadelphia Phillies in 1989.

Phillies announcer and Hall of Famer Richie Ashburn said of Carlton as a pitcher, "Lefty was a craftsman, an artist. He was a perfectionist. He painted a ballgame. Stroke, stroke, stroke, and when he got through (pitching a game) it was a masterpiece."

Carlton picked 144 runners off base, by far the most in Major League Baseball since pickoff records began being collected in 1957. Andy Pettitte is second with 98.

Although he never threw a no-hitter, Carlton pitched six one–hitters, 11th most in baseball history.

Carlton had 90 career balks, by far the most in baseball history.

Carlton was elected to the Baseball Hall of Fame in 1994 with 95.82% of the vote, one of the highest percentages ever.

The Philadelphia Phillies retired Carlton's number 32 in 1989.

The Philadelphia Phillies honored him with a statue outside Citizens Bank Park in 2004. In 1998, The Sporting News ranked Carlton number 30 on its list of the 100 Greatest Baseball Players.

In 1999, Carlton was a nominee for the Major League Baseball All-Century Team.

Despite career-long comparisons with Nolan Ryan, Carlton maintains that his greatest rival was Tom Seaver. Though Carlton and Ryan sporadically exchanged the lead for the all-time strikeout record in the early 1980s, Carlton and Seaver (three) stacked National League Cy Young Awards, Carlton and Seaver (1969) were the aces of their respective pitching staffs during championship seasons, and both earned at least 10 All-Star Game selections each (12 for Seaver). The span of their careers nearly overlapped. However, in head-to-head matchups, Seaver went 11–3 over Carlton.

Moreover, the 19-strikeout performance in a losing effort to the Mets represented a microcosm of Carlton's career against them. While he posted 30 wins against them during his career, they bested him 36 times.

Carlton appeared in an episode of Married... with Children, playing himself in an episode where former athletes humiliate Al Bundy while filming a shoe commercial. In the episode, Kelly Bundy asks him for an autograph and he is shown writing with his right hand.

In an interview with ESPN's Roy Firestone, Firestone asked Carlton, “Why do you think you were put on this earth?” Carlton answered, “To teach the world how to throw a slider.”

=== Charges of bigotry and Antisemitism ===
In 1994, he agreed to an interview with writer Pat Jordan at Carlton's home in Durango, Colorado. The result was the story "Thin Mountain Air" in the April 1994 issue of Philadelphia. The article was noted by Murray Chass of The New York Times as being the source of numerous claims about Carlton's political and social beliefs:

According to Pat Jordan, the writer of the article, Carlton alternately said that the world is ruled or controlled by the Russian and United States Governments, which "fill the air with low-frequency sound waves," the Elders of Zion, British intelligence agencies, "12 Jewish bankers meeting in Switzerland" and "a committee of 300 which meets at a roundtable in Rome." Not only that, but Carlton also charges, according to Jordan, that President Clinton has "a black son" he won't acknowledge and that the AIDS virus was created at a secret Maryland biological warfare laboratory to get rid of gays and blacks.

The same article notes that former teammate Tim McCarver defended Carlton against charges of being a bigot and an Antisemite, though he acknowledged "If he's guilty of anything, it's believing some of the material he reads. Does he become confused with his reading about radical things? Yes. I've told him that. Does that translate into him being antisemitic? No."

== Personal life ==
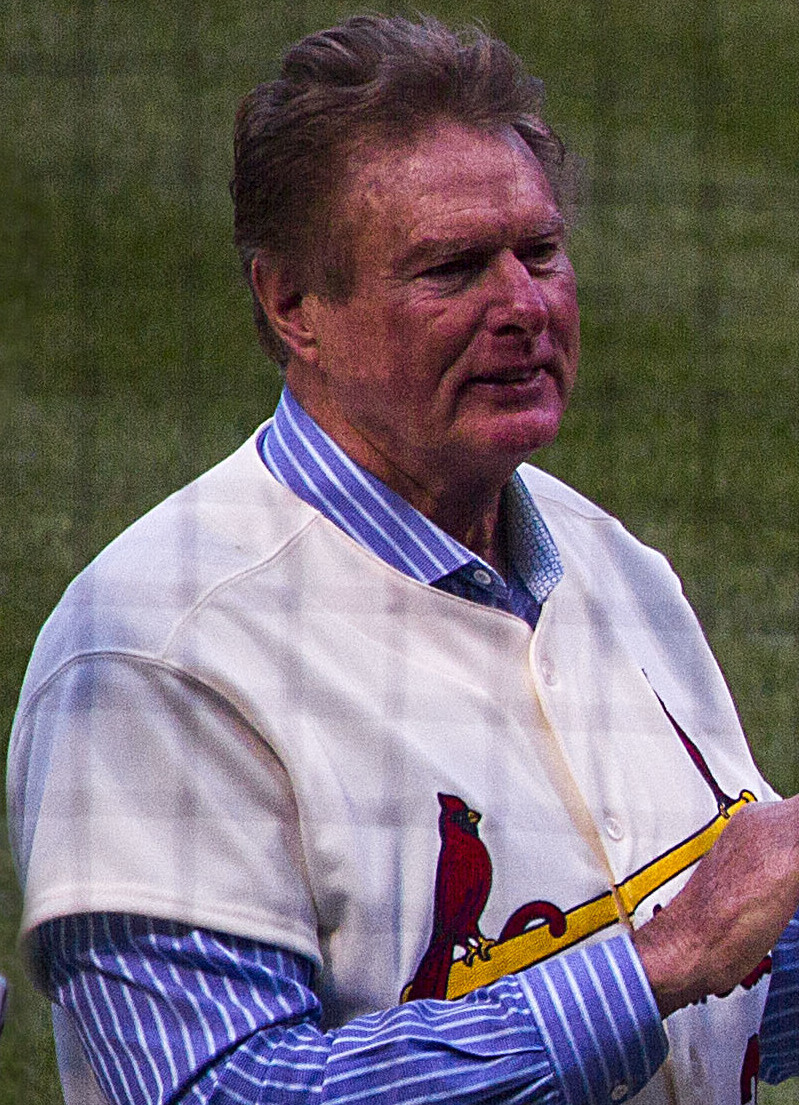
Carlton in 2017

Carlton was married to Beverly for 33 years, divorcing in 1998. The couple had two sons.

As of 2017, Carlton lives in Durango, Colorado.

Carlton has an orchard and 150 fruit trees, saying, "Before Al Gore was green, I was green." Of his healthy partnership with St. Luke's, he added, "I'm interested in this 'fit for life' idea, we're trying to get people off the couch, move a little bit, not a sedentary life. ... St. Luke's and myself, we're on the same page as far as how we think about that. I'm not on the medicine side, but I've been trained well. I know a lot of different arts. That's what I'm interested in."

In 2017, Carlton said that he hadn't had a television in around 15 years and didn't follow daily baseball. "I don't know these players anymore, (I know) some of the coaches, but I've moved on. Something else to do, there's more to it. I owned it for 24 years. I played it, so I don't need to do it again. I'm on to different things."

Speaking about today's pitch counts, Carlton added, "I wasn't raised in this environment, so I think differently. These guys don't know anything but pitch counts. I would balk at it because I don't agree with it, but they can't go up against it because that's all they know. Philosophically I don't agree with it because I think these guys are not really in shape because they don't throw enough. You need to throw so much so the tendons, ligaments, the muscle and bone get bigger, denser, stronger to be able to handle the stress of throwing. I don't think they throw enough. 100 pitches is not a lot. You warm up with 100 pitches. Then you throw your 200. We threw 185 pitches in a game."

Tim McCarver, Carlton's longtime teammate and personal catcher, said jokingly once: "When Steve (Carlton) and I die, we are going to be buried in the same cemetery, sixty feet, six inches apart." McCarver died first in 2023.

=== Financial troubles and lawsuit against agent ===
For much of his career, Carlton was represented by David Landfield, who negotiated his contracts and endorsement deals, made investments on his behalf, and received Carlton's salary checks before sending Carlton a monthly allowance. While Carlton earned almost $10 million in salary over the last decade of his career, Landfield's investments all cratered, and by 1983 the money had vanished. Carlton fired Landfield in July 1983 and sued him in August 1983, claiming that he had embezzled "far in excess of $100,000" from Carlton. By that time, Landfield had declared bankruptcy, and Carlton was unable to recover any of the money.

== Honors ==
- In 1989, Carlton's #32 was retired by the Philadelphia Phillies.
- Carlton was inducted into the Florida Sports Hall of Fame in 1989.
- Carlton was elected to the Baseball Hall of Fame in 1994.
- In 2004, the Philadelphia Phillies erected a statue of Carlton, displayed outside Citizens Bank Park.

== See also ==
- Major League Baseball titles leaders
- Major League Baseball Triple Crown
- List of Major League Baseball annual ERA leaders
- List of Major League Baseball annual strikeout leaders
- List of Major League Baseball annual wins leaders
- List of Major League Baseball career strikeout leaders
- List of Major League Baseball career wins leaders
- List of Major League Baseball career wild pitches leaders
- List of Major League Baseball single-game strikeout leaders
