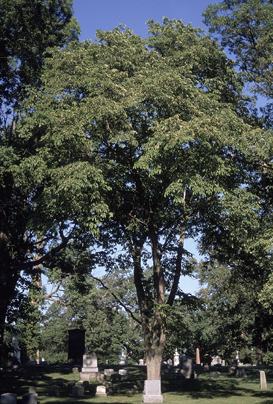
- Mature cultivated slippery elm (Ulmus rubra)

Conservation status
- Least Concern (IUCN 3.1)

Scientific classification
- Kingdom: Plantae
- Clade: Tracheophytes
- Clade: Angiosperms
- Clade: Eudicots
- Clade: Rosids
- Order: Rosales
- Family: Ulmaceae
- Genus: Ulmus
- Subgenus: U. subg. Ulmus
- Section: U. sect. Ulmus
- Species: U. rubra

Binomial name
- Ulmus rubra Muhl.
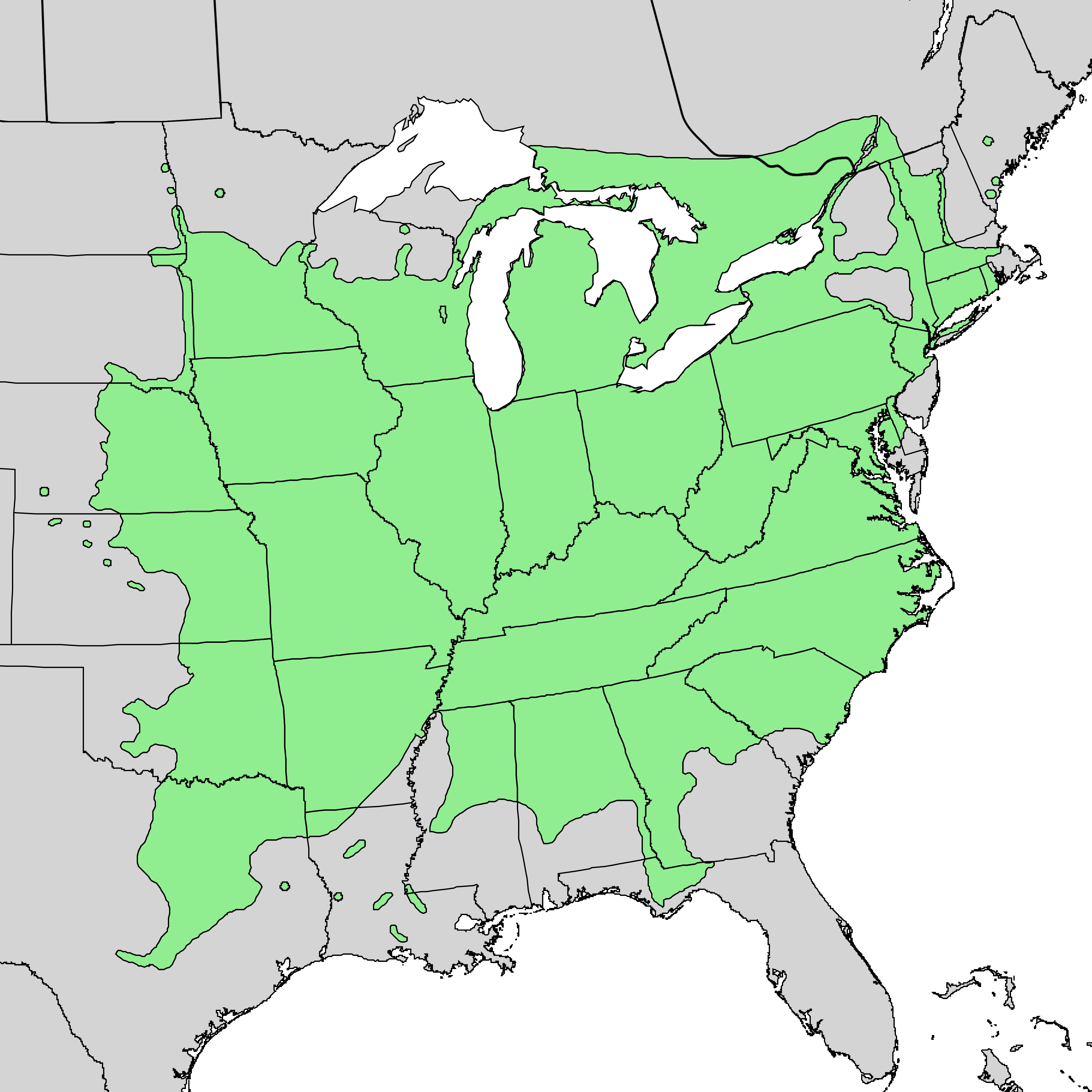
- Natural range of Ulmus rubra

Synonyms
- Ulmus americana L. var. rubra Aiton; Ulmus crispa Willd.; Ulmus dimidiata Raf.; Ulmus elliptica Anon.; Ulmus fulva Michx., Loudon, Bentley & Trimen, Sarg.; Ulmus Heyderi Späth; Ulmus pinguis Raf.; Ulmus pubescens Walter

= Ulmus rubra =

Species of tree

Ulmus rubra, the slippery elm, is a species of elm native to eastern North America. Other common names include red elm, gray elm, soft elm, moose elm, and Indian elm. It is closely related to the European wych elm (U. glabra), which has a very similar flower structure but lacks the pubescence over the seed.

== Description ==
Ulmus rubra is a medium-sized deciduous tree with a spreading head of branches, commonly growing to 12–19 metres (39–62 feet), very occasionally over 30 m (98 ft) in height. Its heartwood is reddish-brown. The broad oblong to obovate leaves are 10–20 centimetres (4–8 inches) long, rough above but velvety below, with coarse double-serrate margins, acuminate apices and oblique bases; the petioles are 6–12 millimetres (1/4–15/32 in) long. The leaves are often tinged red on emergence, turning dark green by summer and a dull yellow in autumn. The perfect, apetalous, wind-pollinated flowers are produced before the leaves in early spring, usually in tight, short-stalked, clusters of 10–20. The reddish-brown fruit is an oval winged samara, orbicular to obovate, slightly notched at the top, 12–18 mm (15/32–23/32 in) long, the single, central seed coated with red-brown hairs, naked elsewhere.

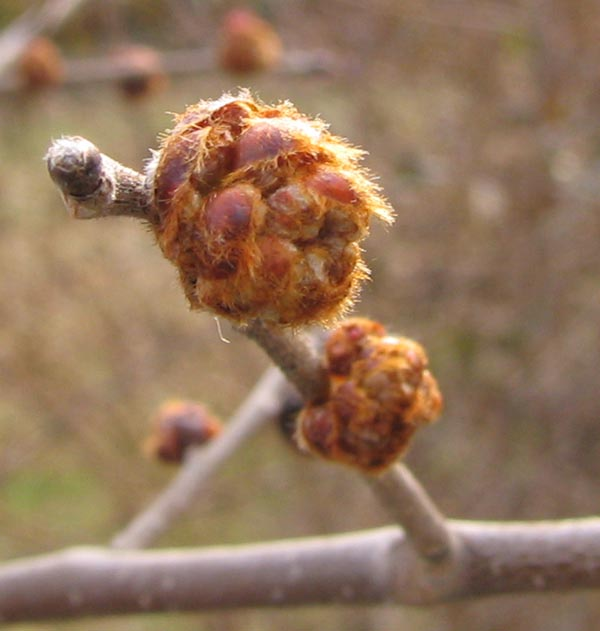
Downy leaf bud and flower buds of U. rubra

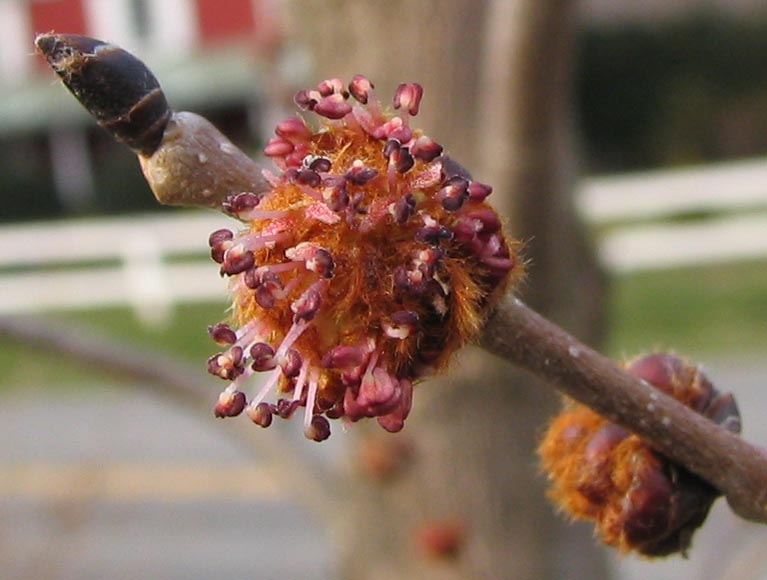
U. rubra flowers

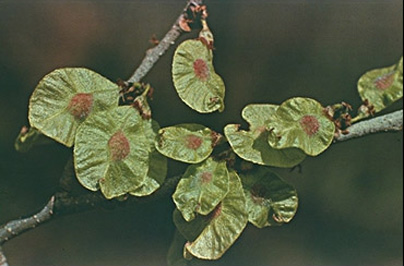
U. rubra fruit

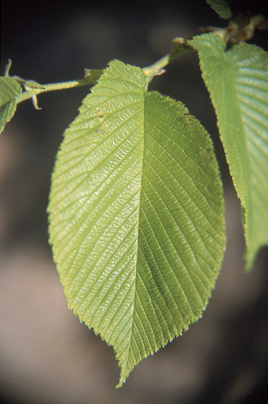
Asymmetrical leaf of Ulmus rubra

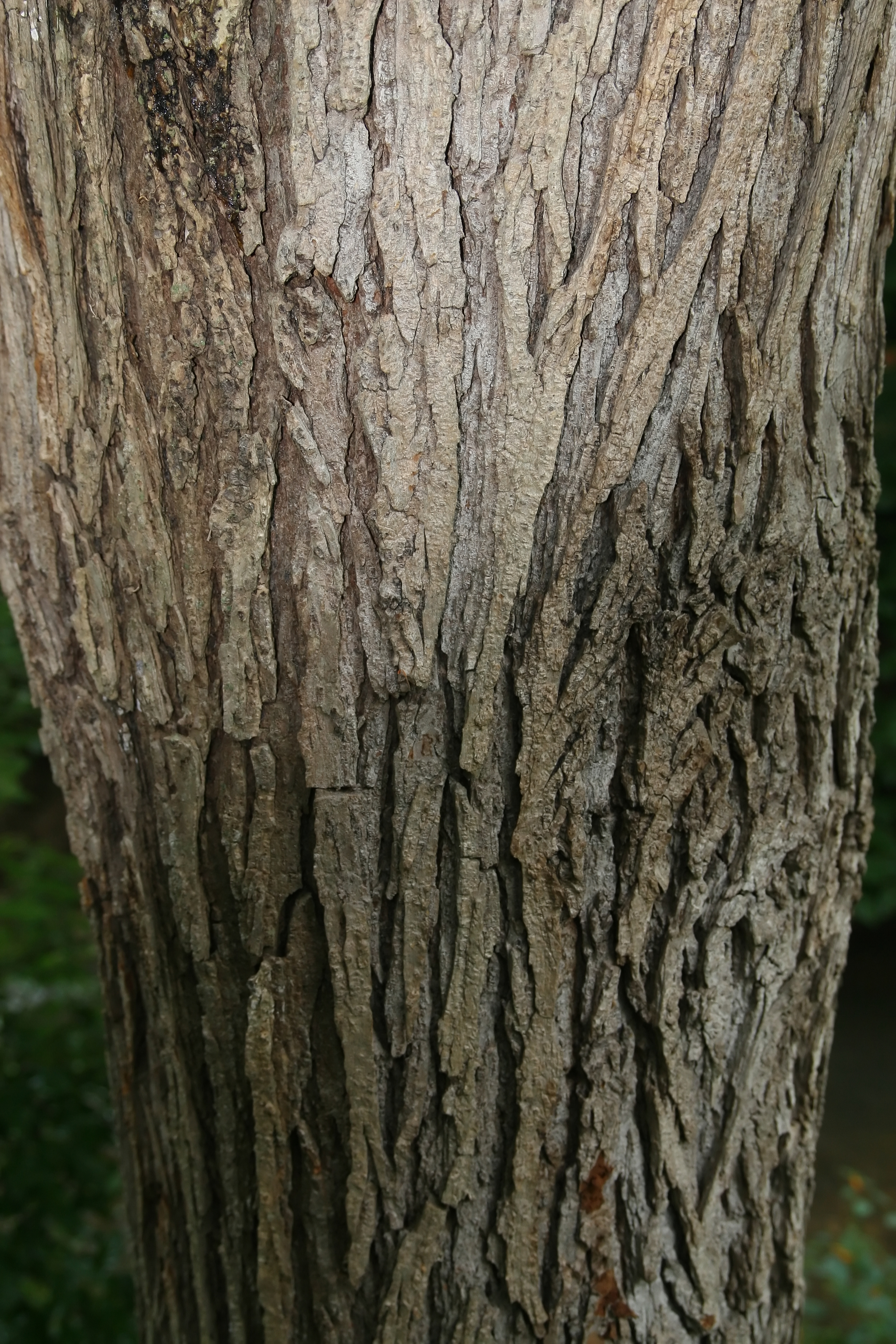
Mature trunk bark

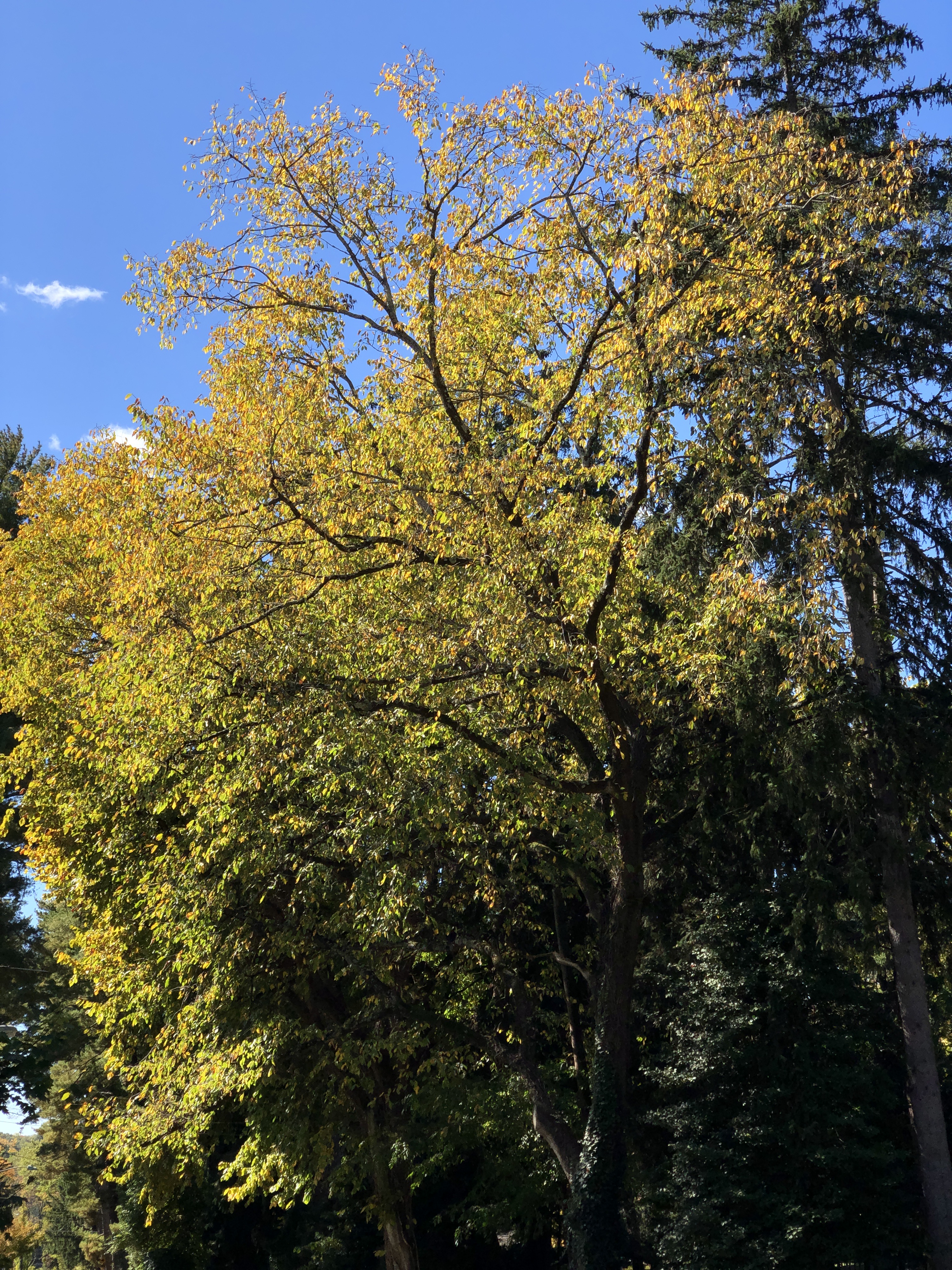
Fall color of U. rubra

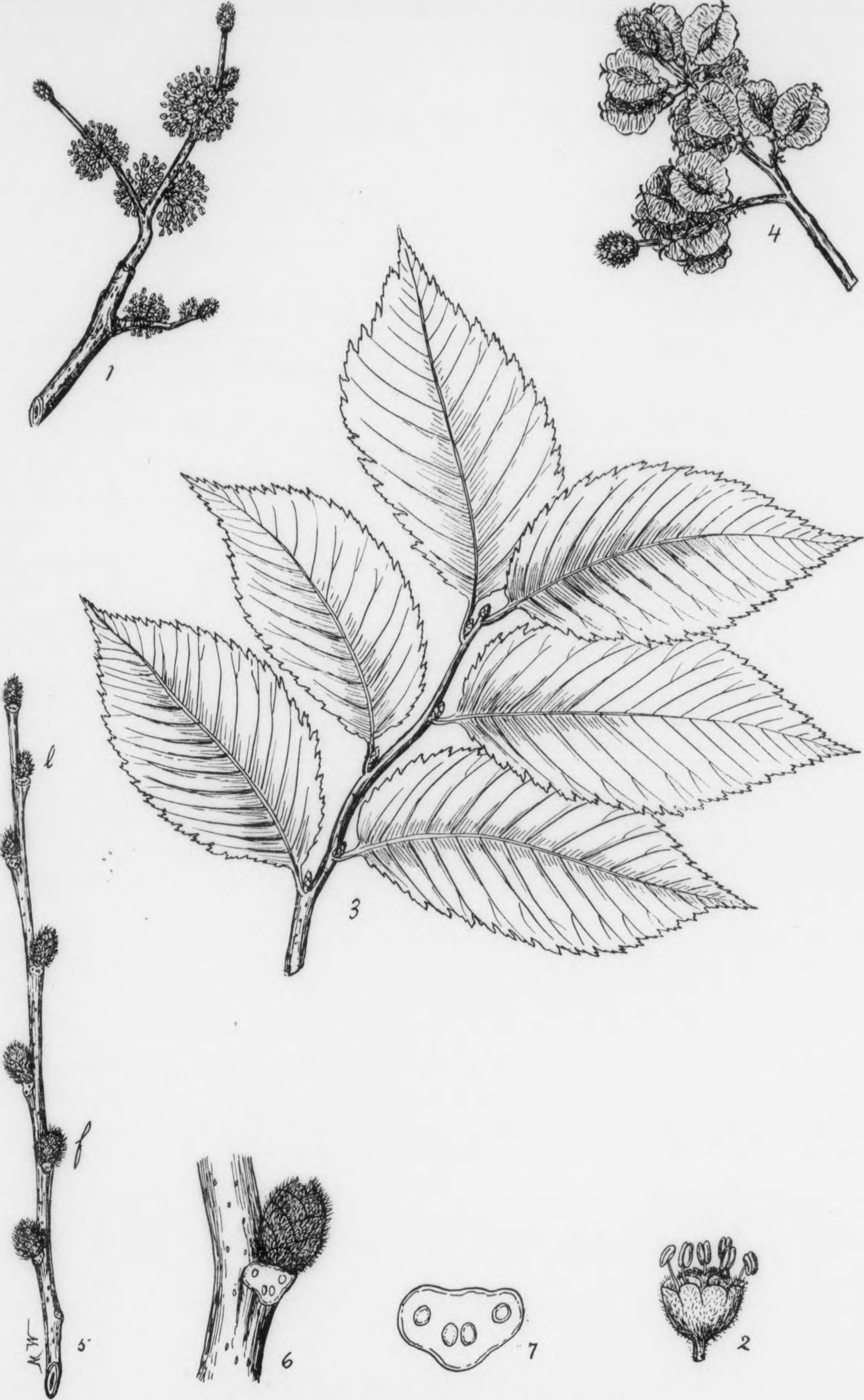
Downy leaf-buds and seed area of samarae

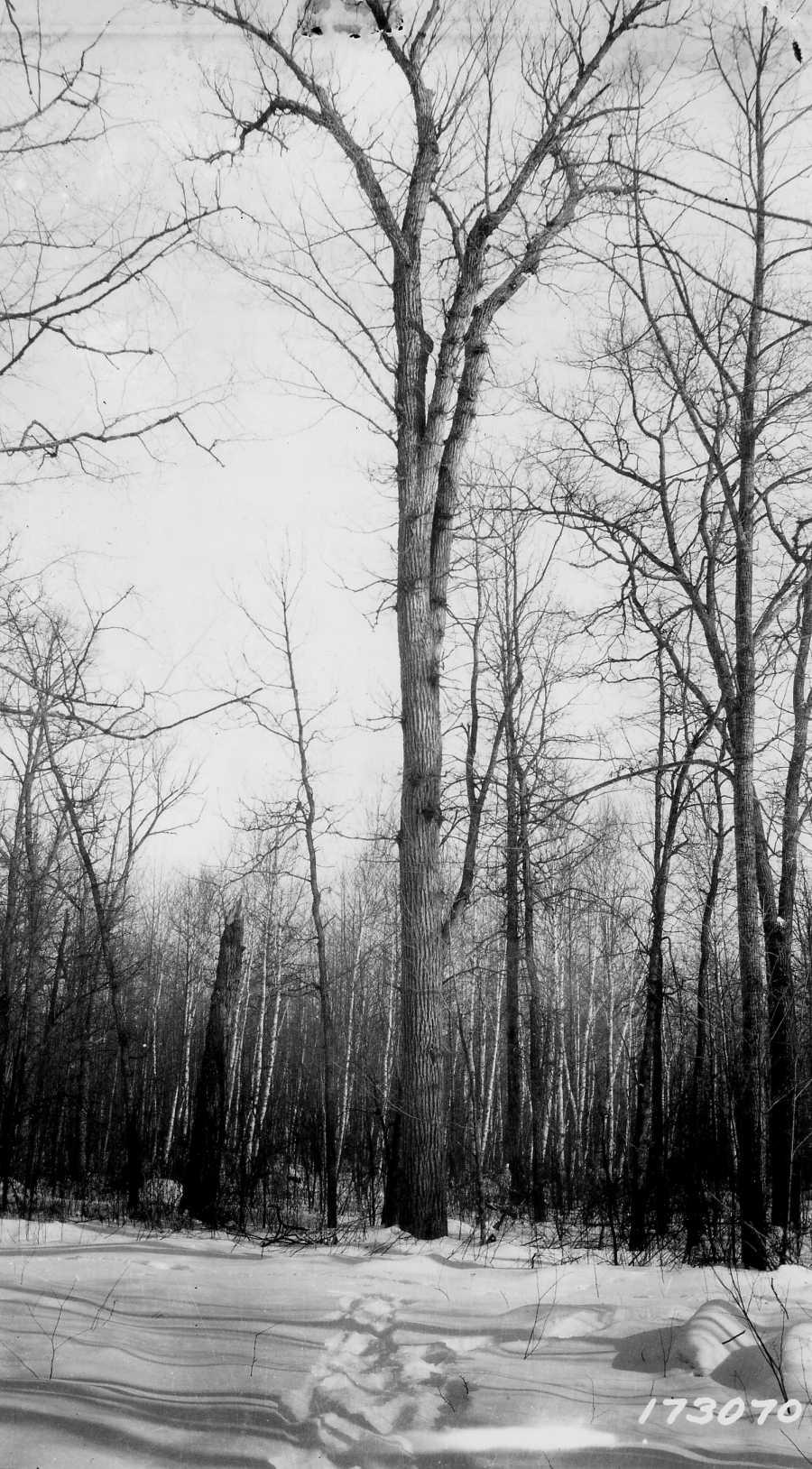
Slippery elm, Chippewa National Forest, Minnesota, 1923

The species superficially resembles American elm (Ulmus americana), but is chiefly distinguished from American elm by its downy twigs, chestnut brown or reddish hairy buds, and slimy red inner bark.

== Taxonomy ==
The tree was first named as part of Ulmus americana in 1753, but identified as a separate species, U. rubra, in 1793 by Pennsylvania botanist Gotthilf Muhlenberg. The slightly later name U. fulva, published by French botanist André Michaux in 1803, is still widely used in information related to dietary supplements and alternative medicine.

=== Etymology ===
The specific epithet rubra (red), and the common name 'red elm', allude to the tree's reddish-brown heartwood, whilst the common name 'slippery elm' alludes to the mucilaginous inner bark.

== Distribution and habitat ==
The species is native to eastern North America, ranging from southeast North Dakota, east to Maine and southern Quebec, south to northernmost Florida, and west to eastern Texas, where it thrives in moist uplands, although it will also grow in dry, intermediate soils.

== Ecology ==
=== Pests and diseases ===
The tree is reputedly less susceptible to Dutch elm disease than other species of American elms, but is severely damaged by the elm leaf beetle (Xanthogaleruca luteola).

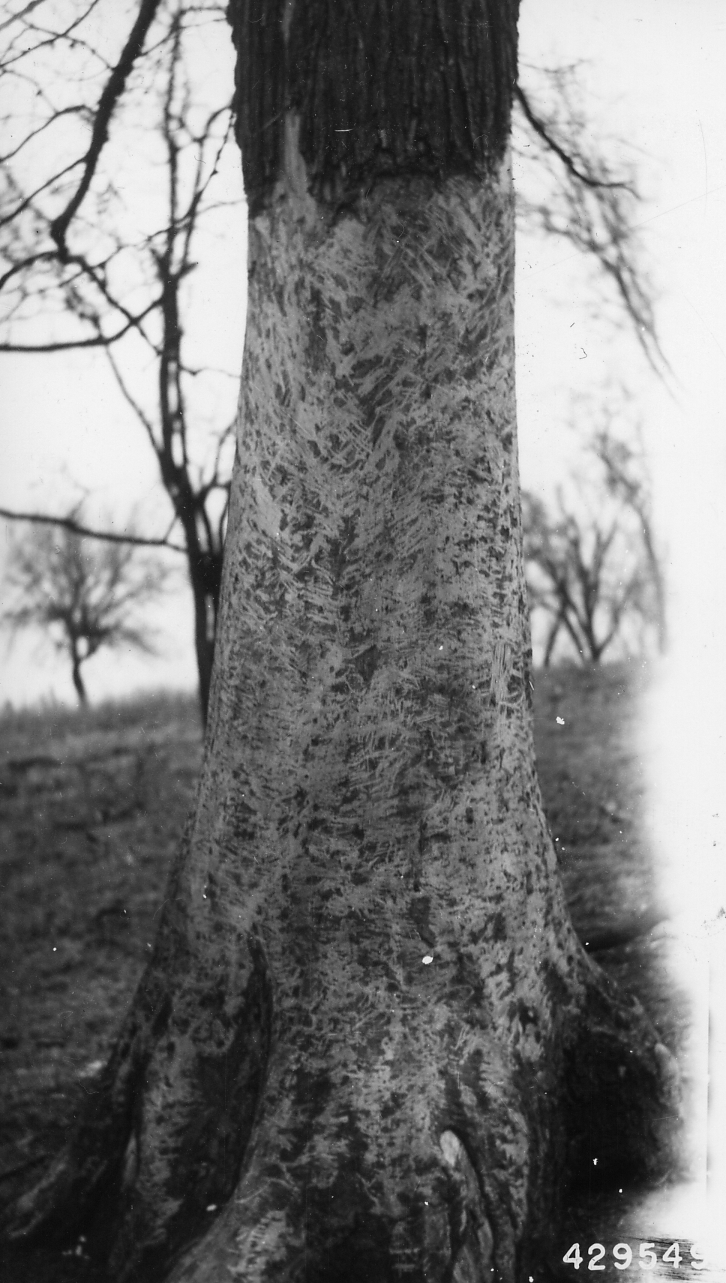
Red elm bark browsed by horses, Marshall, Illinois

=== Hybridization in the wild ===
In the central United States, native U. rubra hybridizes in the wild with the Siberian elm (U. pumila), which was introduced in the early 20th century and has spread widely since, prompting conservation concerns for the genetic integrity of the former species. The hybrid group is known as Ulmus × intermedia.

== Cultivation ==
The species has seldom been planted for ornament in its native country, though it occasionally appeared in early 20th-century US nursery catalogues. Introduced to Europe in 1830, and later to Australasia, it has never thrived in the UK; Elwes & Henry knew of not one good specimen, and the last tree planted at Kew attained a height of only 12 m (39 ft) in 60 years. Specimens supplied by the Späth nursery of Berlin to the Royal Botanic Garden Edinburgh in 1902 as U. fulva may survive in Edinburgh as it was the practice of the Garden to distribute trees about the city (vide Wentworth Elm). A specimen at RBGE was felled c.1990. The current list of Living Accessions held in the Garden per se does not list the plant. The tree was propagated and marketed in the UK by the Hillier & Sons nursery, Winchester, Hampshire, from 1945, with 20 sold in the period 1970 to 1976, when production ceased. Several mature trees survive in Brighton (see Accessions).

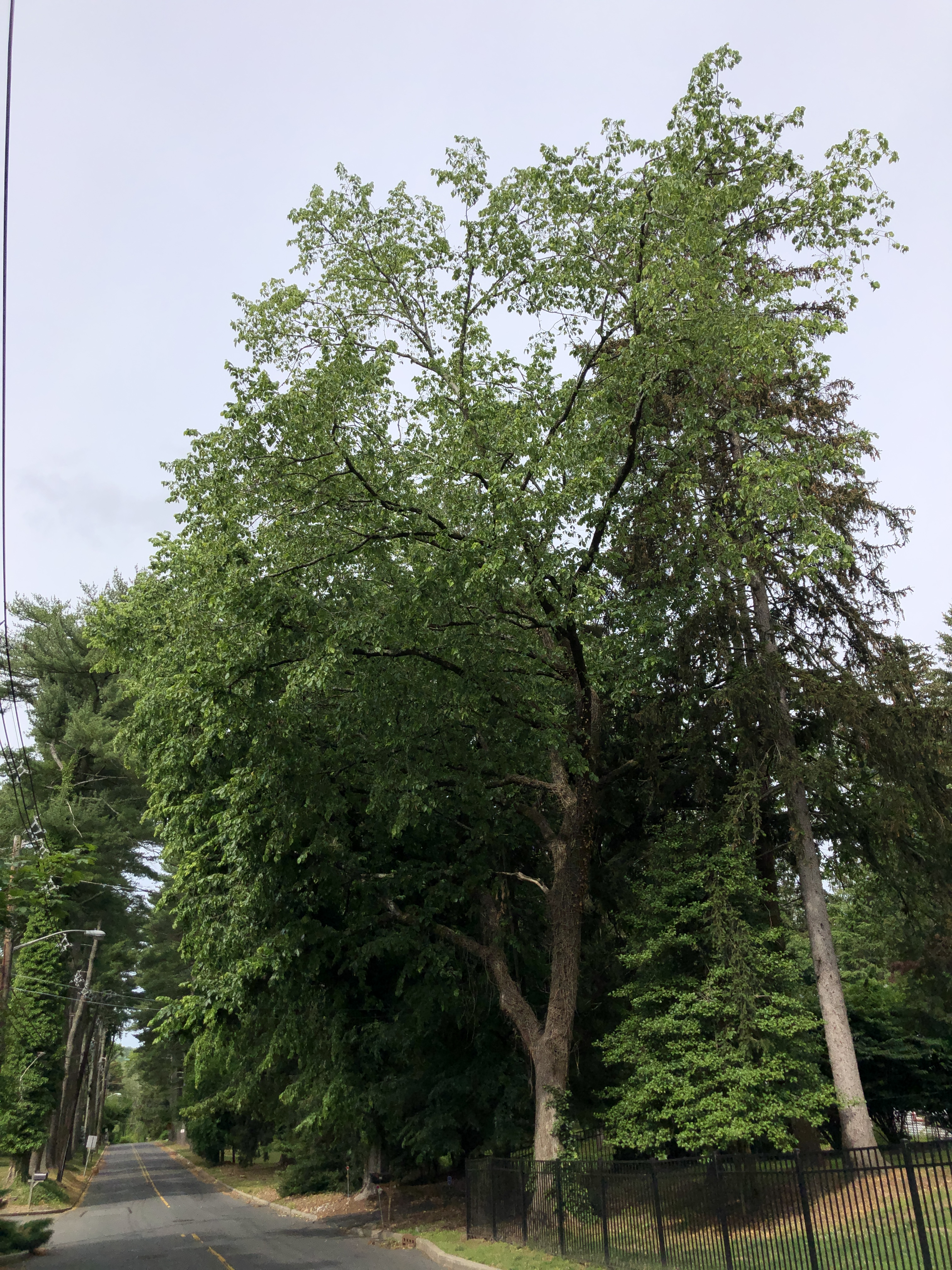
U. rubra, Ewing Township, New Jersey (2023)

== Cultivars ==
There are no known cultivars, though Augustine Henry stated that the cultivar 'Heyderi', distributed by the Späth nursery of Berlin in the late 19th and early 20th centuries as a variety of Ulmus elliptica, was, by some nursery error, propagated from an Ulmus rubra.

Meehan misnamed Ulmus americana 'Beebe's Weeping' as U. fulva pendula (1889) and Späth misnamed Ulmus americana 'Pendula' U. fulva (Michx.) pendula Hort. (1890). The hybrid U. rubra × U. pumila cultivar 'Lincoln' is sometimes erroneously listed as U. rubra 'Lincoln'.

== Uses ==
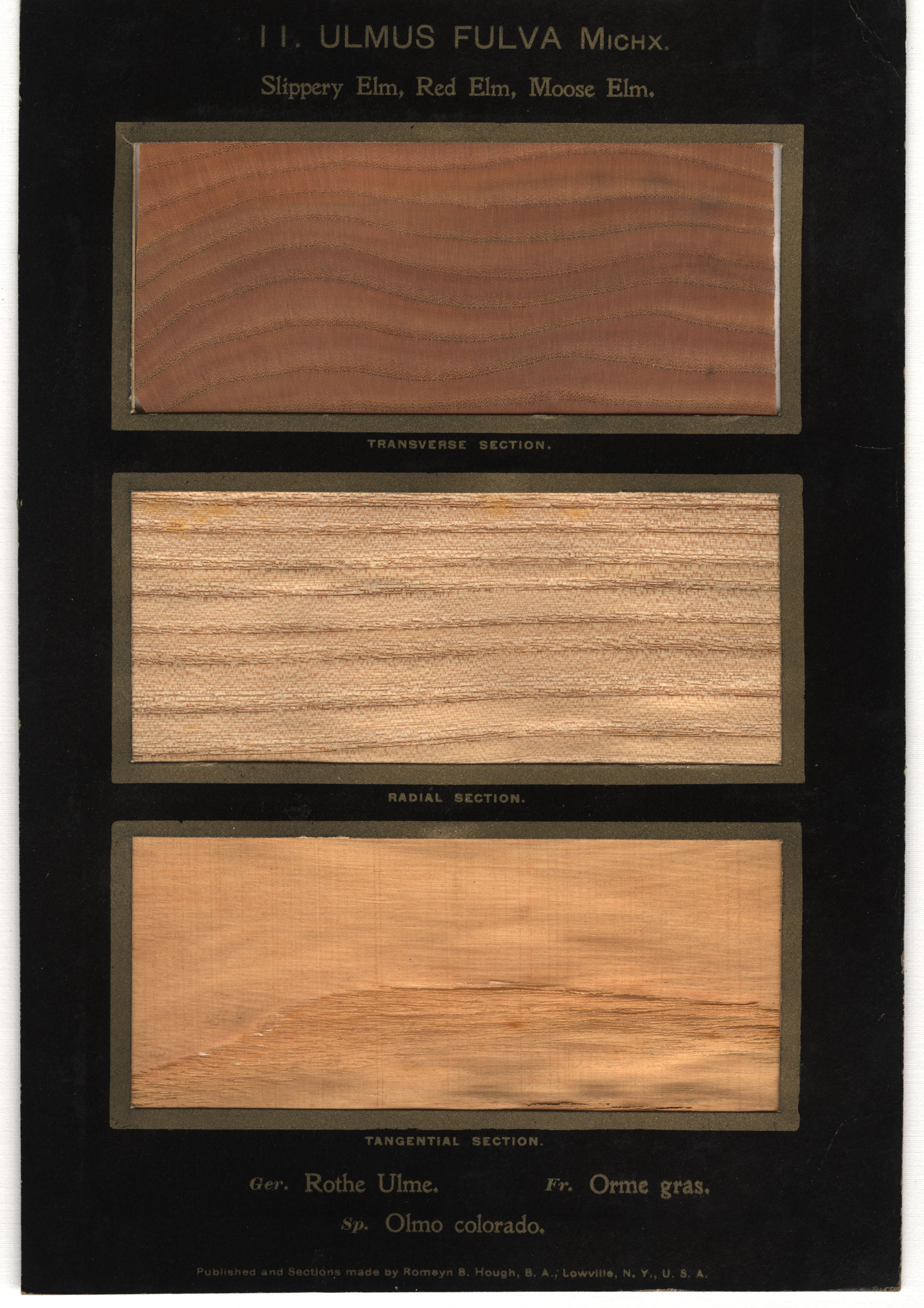
Cross-sections of moose elm from The American Woods

=== Food ===
The mucilaginous inner bark of the tree is edible raw or boiled, and was eaten by Native Americans. The bark can also be used to make tea.

=== Folk medicine ===
The inner bark is used orally in folk medicine to treat sore throat and gastrointestinal upset, and topically for skin rash and irritation.

The inner bark has long been used as a demulcent, and is still marketed commercially for this purpose in the United States as an over-the-counter demulcent. The leaves may be dried and ground into a powder, then made into a tea.

=== Timber ===
The timber is not of much importance commercially, and is not found anywhere in great quantity. Macoun considered it more durable than that of the other elms, and better suited for railway ties, fence-posts, and rails, while Pinchot recommended planting it in the Mississippi valley, as it grows fast in youth, and could be utilized for fence-posts when quite young, since the sapwood, if thoroughly dried, is quite as durable as the heartwood. The wood is also used for the hubs of wagon wheels, as it is very shock resistant owing to the interlocking grain. The wood, as 'red elm', is sometimes used to make bows for archery.

=== Baseball ===
Though now outmoded, slippery elm tablets were chewed by spitball pitchers to enhance the effectiveness of the saliva applied to make the pitched baseball curve. Gaylord Perry wrote about how he used slippery elm tablets in his 1974 autobiography, Me and the Spitter.

=== Miscellaneous ===
The tree's fibrous inner bark produces a strong and durable fiber that can be spun into thread, twine, or rope useful for bowstrings, ropes, jewellery, clothing, snowshoe bindings, woven mats, and even some musical instruments. Once cured, the wood is also excellent for starting fires with the bow-drill method, as it grinds into a very fine flammable powder under friction.

== Notable trees ==
A tree in Westmount, Quebec, Canada, measured 4.27 m (14 ft) in girth in 2011. The US national champion, measuring 7.16 m (23 1/2 ft) in circumference and 27.4 metres (90 ft) tall, with an average crown spread of 25.18 metres (82 1/2 ft) wide, grows in Kentucky. Another tall specimen grows in the Bronx, New York City, at 710 West 246th Street, measuring 31 m (102 ft) high in 2002.

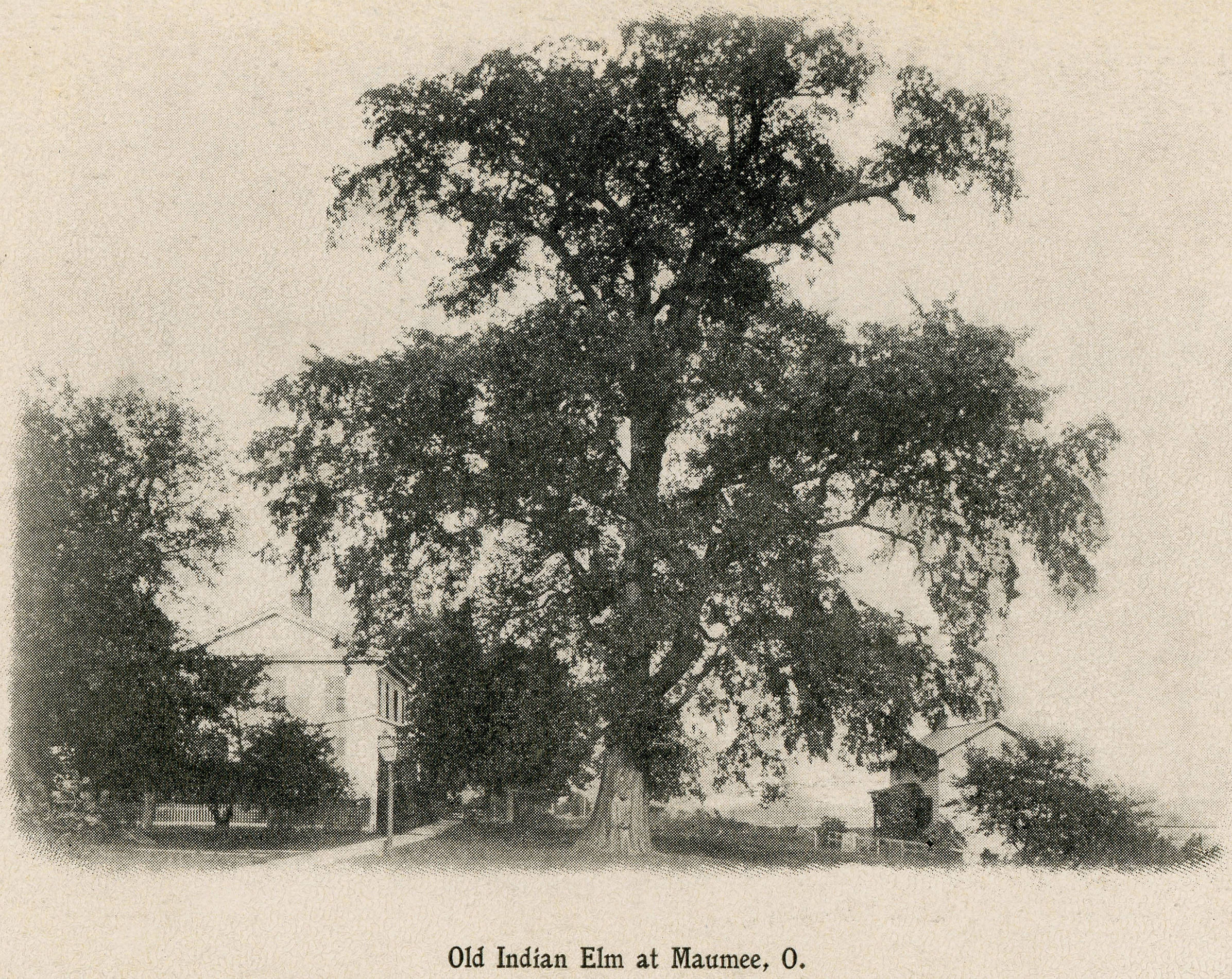
"Old Indian Elm" at Maumee, Ohio

== Hybrid cultivars ==
U. rubra had limited success as a hybrid parent in the 1960s, resulting in the cultivars 'Coolshade', 'Fremont', 'Improved Coolshade', 'Lincoln', 'Rosehill', and probably 'Willis'. In later years, it was also used in the Wisconsin elm breeding program to produce 'Repura' and 'Revera' although neither is known to have been released to commerce. In Germany, the tree formed part of a complex hybrid raised by the Eisele nursery in Darmstadt, provisionally named 'Eisele H1'; patent pending (2020).

== Accessions ==
=== North America ===
- Arnold Arboretum, US. Acc. nos. 737–88 (unrecorded provenance), 172-2017 (Massachusetts), 344-2017 (Missouri).
- Bernheim Arboretum and Research Forest , Clermont, Kentucky, US. No details available.
- Brenton Arboretum, Dallas Center, Iowa, US. No details available.
- Chicago Botanic Garden, Glencoe, Illinois, US. 1 tree, no other details available.
- Dominion Arboretum, Ottawa, Ontario, Canada. No acc. details available.
- Longwood Gardens, US. Acc. no. L–3002, of unrecorded provenance.
- Nebraska Statewide Arboretum, US. No details available.
- Smith College, US. Acc. no. 8119PA.
- U S National Arboretum , Washington, D.C., US. Acc. no. 77501.

=== Europe ===
- Brighton & Hove City Council, UK. NCCPG Elm Collection. Carden Park, Hollingdean (1 tree); Malthouse Car Park, Kemp Town (1 tree).
- Grange Farm Arboretum, Sutton St James, Spalding, Lincolnshire, UK. Acc. no. 522
- Hortus Botanicus Nationalis, Salaspils, Latvia. Acc. nos. 18168, 18169, 18170.
- Linnaean Gardens of Uppsala, Sweden. Acc. no. 2009–0223. Wild collected in US.
- Royal Botanic Gardens Wakehurst Place, UK. Acc. no. 1973–21050.
- Thenford House arboretum, Northamptonshire, UK. No details available.
- University of Copenhagen Botanic Garden, Denmark. No details available.
- Wijdemeren City Council elm collection, The Netherlands. One tree planted gardens Rading 1, Loosdrecht.

=== Australasia ===
- Eastwoodhill Arboretum , Gisborne, New Zealand. 1 tree, no details available.
