= Ulmus 'Pendula' =

Ulmus 'Pendula' may refer to:

- Ulmus americana 'Pendula'
- Ulmus minor 'Pendula'
- Ulmus pumila 'Pendula'
