= Ulmus × intermedia =

Scientific classification
- Kingdom: Plantae
- Clade: Tracheophytes
- Clade: Angiosperms
- Clade: Eudicots
- Clade: Rosids
- Order: Rosales
- Family: Ulmaceae
- Genus: Ulmus
- Species: U. × intermedia

Binomial name
- Ulmus × intermedia Elowsky

Hybrid plant

Ulmus × intermedia is a natural hybrid elm occurring across Nebraska and several other Midwestern states, derived from the crossing of Ulmus rubra and Ulmus pumila. As U. rubra is far less fertile, and highly susceptible to Dutch elm disease (:DED), it could eventually be hybridized out of existence by U. × intermedia. The hybrid was first reported from the wild in the Chicago region in 1950 and was provisionally named U. × notha Wilhelm & Ware in 1994.

The horticulture industry made a number of artificial crosses of the two species, such as 'Coolshade' and 'Fremont', in an attempt to create ornamental trees resistant to DED.

== Description ==
Ulmus × intermedia is significantly different from both parental species, except in biometrics such as leaf length to width ratios, number of teeth, petiole length, and pollen size. The leaves are 4.5–12 × 2.5–6 cm, petiole 0.3 × 1.2 cm, ovate to lanceolate, apex acuminate to acute, base oblique. The samarae are 11.5–21.0 × 10.0–20.0 mm, cream to white.

Atypically, fertility of the hybrid seed is high, occasionally in excess of 90%, while Collins found in artificial hybridization no reduction of fertility in the F1 or F2 generations.

== Pests and diseases ==
Morton Arboretum report the hybrid susceptible to DED and elm yellows (Elm phloem necrosis).

== Cultivation ==
Specimens of unnamed Ulmus × intermedia ( = Ulmus × notha) stand (2015) in Morton Arboretum, Illinois, received as Ulmus pumila from North Platte Agricultural Experiment Station, University of Nebraska.

== Cultivars ==
- Coolshade
- Improved Coolshade
- Fremont
- Lincoln
- Rosehill
- Willis

'Hamburg' may also belong to the Ulmus × intermedia group.
