= Ulmus × intermedia 'Lincoln' =

Elm cultivar

Ulmus × intermedia cultivar
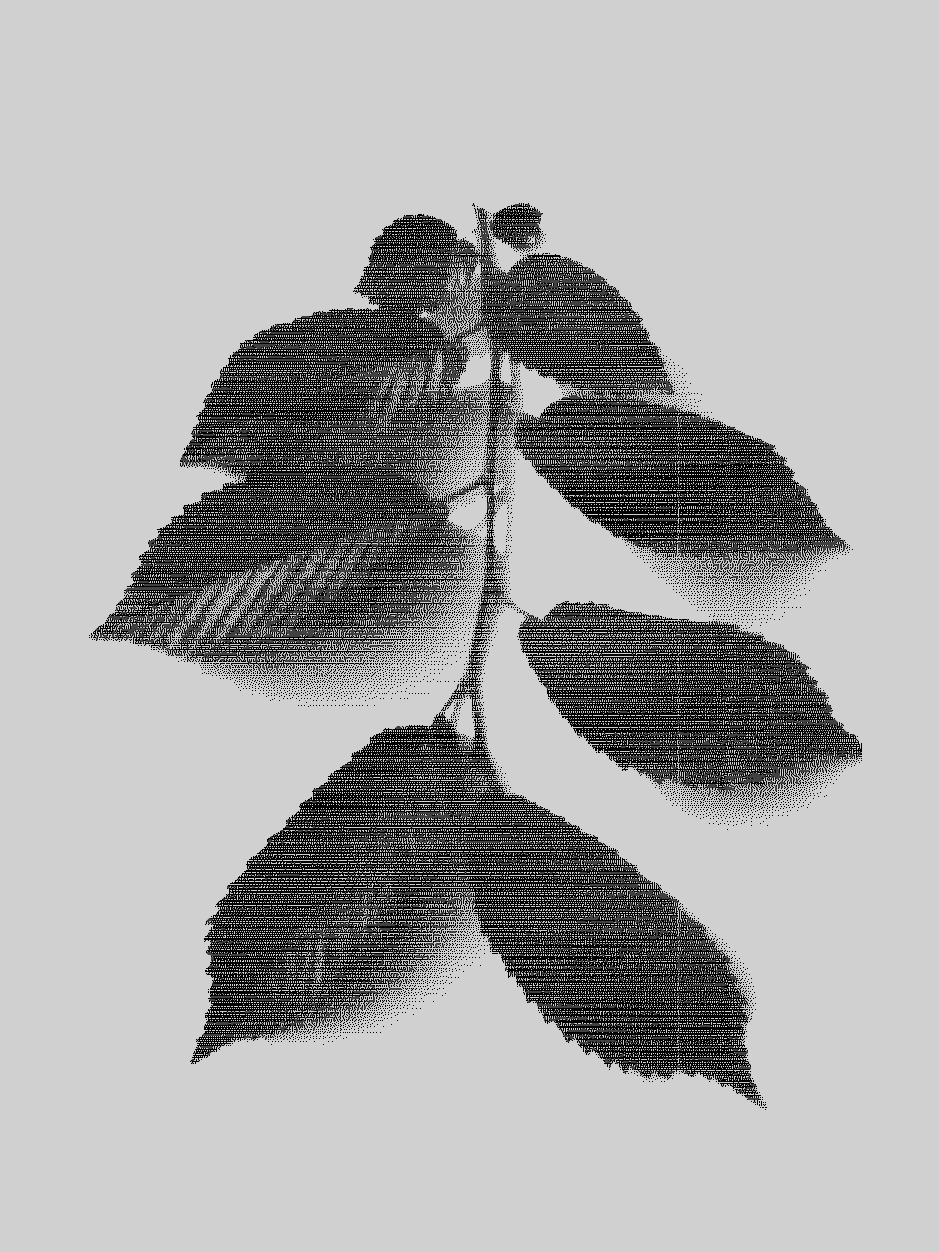
- Hybrid parentage: U. rubra × U. pumila
- Cultivar: 'Lincoln'
- Origin: US

The hybrid elm cultivar Ulmus × intermedia 'Lincoln' was selected from crossings of the Slippery, or Red, Elm Ulmus rubra (female parent) and the Siberian Elm Ulmus pumila made in Aurora, Illinois, circa 1958 and patented in 1983 by Samuel Clegg of Clegg Landscaping, Plainfield, IL and Charles McFarland of Urbana, IL.

== Description ==
'Lincoln' is parabolic in shape, with excurrent branching; the bark is slightly fissured, and dark grey-green in colour. The branches are slender and smooth, with moderately abundant lenticels; the branching angle at the axis approximately 55°. The leaves are cordante-acuminate, about 9 cm long by 5 cm wide, with doubly serrate margins, the slightly scabrous upper surfaces a lustrous dark green, turning yellow in the fall. The foliage is retained well into autumn .

== Pests and diseases ==
Although reported (in patent) to be resistant to Dutch elm disease, 'Lincoln' has not been widely tested. In trials in Oklahoma, the clone was heavily to severely damaged by the elm leaf beetle Xanthogaleruca luteola.

== Cultivation ==
Commercial propagation has been by either softwood cuttings or budding onto Siberian elm rootstocks. 'Lincoln' is not known to be in cultivation beyond North America. Hardiness: USDA zone 3 (hardy to −25 F).

== Synonymy ==
- Ulmus rubra 'Lincoln': in error, various authorities.

== Accessions ==
Not known.

== Nurseries ==
Not known.
