= Ulmus × intermedia 'Rosehill' =

Elm cultivar

Ulmus × intermedia cultivar
- Hybrid parentage: U. pumila × U. rubra
- Cultivar: 'Rosehill'
- Origin: Missouri, US

The hybrid elm cultivar Ulmus × intermedia 'Rosehill' is an American hybrid cultivar originally raised by the Rose Hill Nurseries of Kansas City, Missouri, as Ulmus 'Rose Hill', without species names, from a selection of Ulmus pumila (female parent) × Ulmus rubra seedlings made in 1951.

== Description ==
'Rosehill' was described as slightly slower growing than its sibling 'Willis', but carrying a heavier crown, with good branching and attractive foliage. Herbarium specimens show leaves 2 to 3 in. long and 1 to 2 in. wide, and the seed central in a rounded samara, with an open circular notch at the apex.

== Pests and diseases ==
In 1995 Santamour reported the cultivar "not widely tested for resistance to Dutch elm disease". Elowsky, Jordon-Thaden, and Kaul (2013) refer to more recent papers on the subject.

== Cultivation ==
The tree was later marketed by the Willis Nursery Co. of Ottawa, Kansas. It is not known whether 'Rosehill' remains in cultivation, or if it was ever introduced to Europe or Australasia.

== Notable trees ==
A well-grown tree labelled 'Rosehill', sourced from the Willis Nursery of Kansas and planted in 1960, stands in Arnold Arboretum, Massachusetts. The arboretum's herbarium specimen (00170039), labelled simply Ulmus 'Rosehill' in 1984, was changed in 1985 to U. pumila × U. rubra 'Rose Hill'. A photograph shows leaves with only about eight vein pairs, fewer than known examples of Ulmus × intermedia, calling into question the identification of 'Rosehill' as a hybrid of this group. The herbarium specimen, however, shows leaves with on average about 12 vein pairs, more typical of this hybrid group.

== Synonymy ==
- 'Boulevard': Rosehill Gardens, Kansas, Missouri; Spring catalog 1960.

== Accessions ==
=== North America ===
- Arnold Arboretum, US.; acc. no. 748-60.
