= Ulmus americana 'Beebe's Weeping' =

Elm cultivar

- Species: Ulmus americana
- Origin: Galena, Illinois, US

The American elm cultivar Ulmus americana 'Beebe's Weeping' was propagated from a tree growing in the wild at Galena, Illinois, by Mr. E. Beebe in the mid-19th century. Thomas Meehan, who had received cuttings and called it 'Weeping Slippery Elm' before the flowers revealed that it was not Ulmus fulva, suggested the name 'Beebe's Weeping Elm', as there were already U. americana clones called 'Pendula'. In the early 20th century it was marketed, however, as Ulmus 'American Galena Weeping', "American Weeping Elm", by the Klehm nursery of Arlington Heights, Illinois.

== Description ==
'Beebe's Weeping' has thick cord-like branches which curve over as they grow, similar to a Weeping Willow, creating a dome of foliage. A very fast growing cultivar, trees planted at Germantown, Philadelphia, were reputed to gain 6 m (20 ft) per annum. Klehm's top-grafted it at about 8 ft. A photograph of the "weeping willow" form of U. americana appears in Laney's 'The Types of the American elm' (1908; figure 6).

== Pests and diseases ==
No specific information available, but the species as a whole is highly susceptible to Dutch elm disease and elm yellows; it is also moderately preferred for feeding and reproduction by the adult elm leaf beetle Xanthogaleruca luteola, and highly preferred for feeding by the Japanese beetle Popillia japonica in the United States. U. americana is also the most susceptible of all the elms to verticillium wilt.

== Cultivation ==
Meehan's specimens at Germantown were about 35 ft tall in 1889, with trunks 3.5 ft in girth, suggesting an origins- and planting-date (at 1 inch girth growth a year) of the mid-19th century. A few specimens are known to survive in the United States, mostly in Illinois where the cultivar originated.

A curious 'table top' elm growing in the center of Provo, Utah, planted in 1927 and said to be unique, appears to be less vigorous and more lateral-branched than the cultivar.

== Etymology ==
Named for Mr. E. Beebe, discoverer of the tree.

== Synonymy ==
- Ulmus fulva pendula: Meehan, Garden & Forest 2: 286, 1889.
