= Ulmus × intermedia 'Improved Coolshade' =

Elm cultivar

- Hybrid parentage: U. rubra × U. pumila
- Cultivar: 'Improved Coolshade'
- Origin: Sarcoxie, Missouri, US

The hybrid elm cultivar Ulmus × intermedia 'Improved Coolshade' is a superior selection from cultivated seedlings of 'Coolshade' (U. rubra × U. pumila), by Arthur O. Wild of Sarcoxie Nurseries, Sarcoxie, Missouri, United States. It was patented and released by him in 1958. Wild did not use the cultivar name 'Improved Coolshade' (later adopted by Santamour and Bentz) in his patent claim, the assuption being that the superior clone would replace the same nursery's original 'Coolshade'.

== Description ==
The tree is similar to 'Coolshade', but faster growing, with a straighter trunk and more symmetrical branching. The foliage is described as "abundant and relatively dense", with leaves averaging 3 inches in length by 1.75.

== Pests and diseases ==
Although reputedly resistant to Dutch elm disease, it had not been (by 1995) widely tested. Wild reported it "moderately resistant to Dutch elm disease, as determined by inoculation tests and reports by the U. S. Department of Agriculture".

== Cultivation ==
'Improved Coolshade' was noted for its drought tolerance. It is not known whether the tree remains in cultivation in North America, nor whether it was introduced to Europe or Australasia.

== Synonymy ==
- 'Primus' (earlier name for the cultivar).

== Accessions ==
=== North America ===
- Central Experimental Farm Arboretum, Ottawa. 2 trees.
