= Ulmus × intermedia 'Fremont' =

Elm cultivar

Ulmus × intermedia cultivar
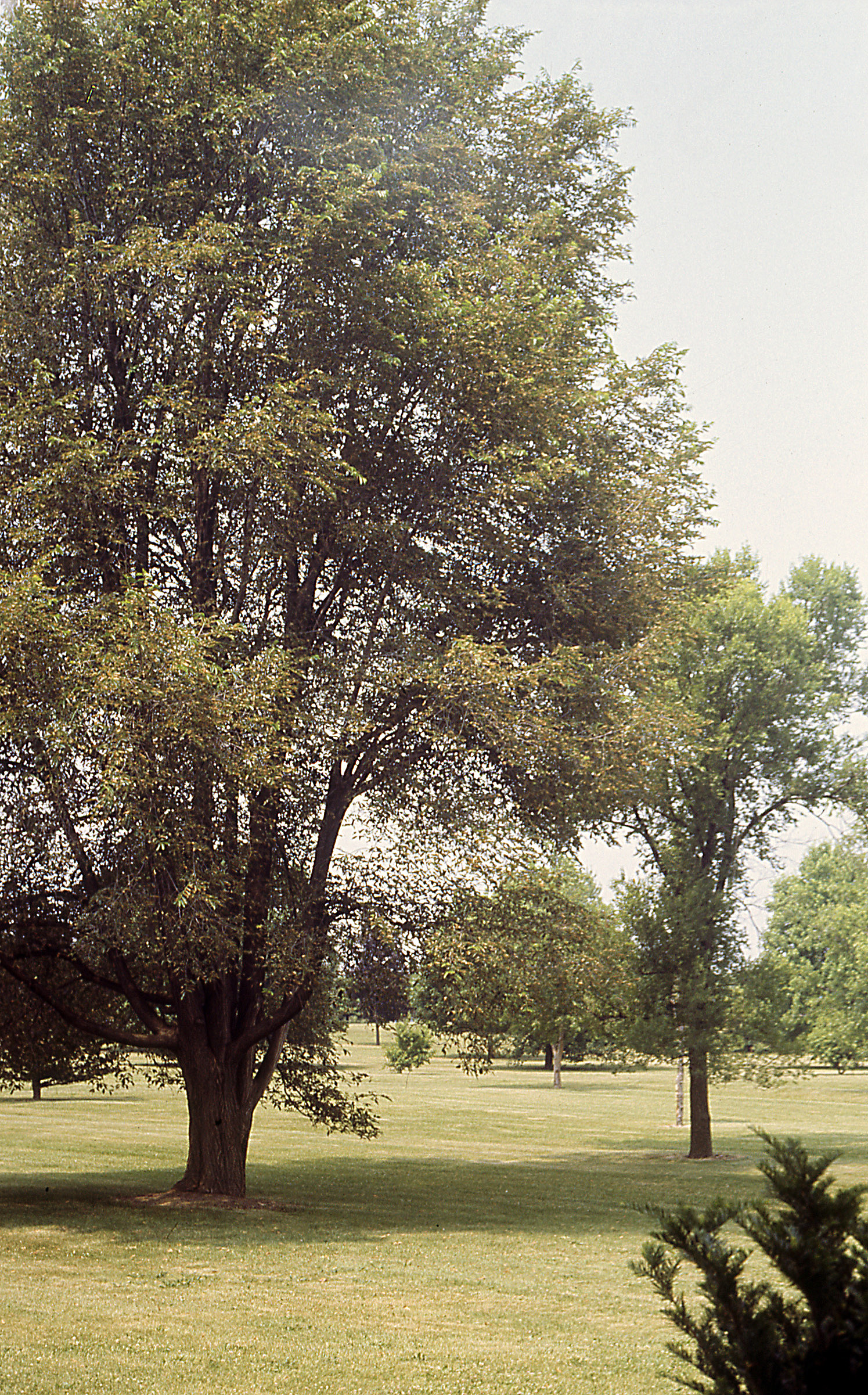
- Ulmus 'Fremont' (U. pumila x U. rubra) (left), Ulmus pumila 'Dropmore' (right), 1987. Wisconsin-Madison Arboretum.
- Hybrid parentage: U. pumila × U. rubra
- Cultivar: 'Fremont'
- Origin: US

The hybrid elm cultivar Ulmus × intermedia 'Fremont' is a little-known American hybrid cultivar propagated from a tree found on the Lloyd Moffet property (formerly the Plumfield Nurseries) at Fremont, Nebraska. The hybrid is believed to have arisen from a crossing of Ulmus pumila (female parent) and one of the spring-flowering elms native to North America, probably Ulmus rubra. The source tree was probably an unsold specimen of the Plumfield Nurseries' "Hybrid Elm", a cross between "Chinese elm" (as U. pumila was then called) and Red elm U. rubra, briefly marketed from 1942 to 1943, but not appearing in later catalogues. This hybrid may have been the same as the cultivar sourced from Plumfield Nurseries at this time as "Hybrid Chinese elm" and later marketed by the Interstate Nurseries, Hamburg, Iowa, as 'Hamburg'.

== Description ==
'Fremont' was described as having a single-stemmed structure. Plumfield Nurseries described their "Hybrid Elm" as "very uniform" in habit and growth, "as rapid a grower as Chinese elm, with larger leaves and heavier limbs than Chinese and not so apt to break under heavy snows or sleet.

== Pests and diseases ==
During the five-year USDA - ARS North Central Region trial period, there was no indication of any disease or insect pests. However, there is no record of the tree having been scientifically tested by inoculation for resistance to Dutch elm disease.

== Cultivation ==
=== USDA trial ===
The USDA - ARS North Central Region trial in the 1950s saw 50 plants of this clone, obtained from the L. R. Sjulin Inter-State Nurseries of Hamburg, Iowa, established at 29 sites in the seven states. As a consequence of the trial, 'Fremont' was considered suitable for planting across the north central region, with the exception of North Dakota and the extreme north of Minnesota. The clone was recommended as a specimen tree for urban lawns and streets, particularly 'in situations requiring quick shade'. However, the tree does not appear to have been a commercial success.

Three specimens planted at the University of Wisconsin–Madison Arboretum in 1957 died or were removed owing to storm damage or poor branching. Sites reporting survival after five years included Fargo, ND, Hays, KS, Benkleman, NE, Madison, WI, Ames, IA, Highmore, SD, Colby, KS, Hastings, NE, North Platte, NE. It is not known whether 'Fremont' was ever introduced to Europe or Australasia.
