= Ulmus × intermedia 'Coolshade' =

Elm cultivar

- Hybrid parentage: U. rubra × U. pumila
- Cultivar: 'Coolshade'
- Origin: Sarcoxie, Missouri, USA

The hybrid elm cultivar Ulmus × intermedia 'Coolshade' is an American hybrid cultivar cloned from a crossing of the Slippery, or Red, Elm Ulmus rubra (female parent) and the Siberian Elm Ulmus pumila at the Sarcoxie Nurseries, Sarcoxie, Missouri, in 1946. At Arnold Arboretum, where there was a specimen, herbarium material was labelled Ulmus pumila 'Coolshade'.

== Description ==
'Coolshade' has rapid, stocky growth with a compact crown resistant to breakage under ice and snow. Its foliage is a very dark green. There appears to be little evidence of Ulmus rubra ingression in the Arnold Arboretum tree; leaf specimens taken in 1960 are labelled Ulmus pumila 'Coolshade', suggesting that its hybridity may have been questioned there.

== Pests and diseases ==
Reputedly tolerant of Dutch elm disease, 'Coolshade' has not been tested by inoculation to determine the degree of resistance.

== Cultivation ==
'Coolshade' was raised to create a disease-resistant tree that would not suffer the storm damage frequently sustained by the weak-wooded U. pumila. The tree was introduced to the UK in the 1960s but no longer survives there. A claimant in Tenantry Rd, Brighton, has more vein-pairs, larger leaves and shorter petioles than the type.

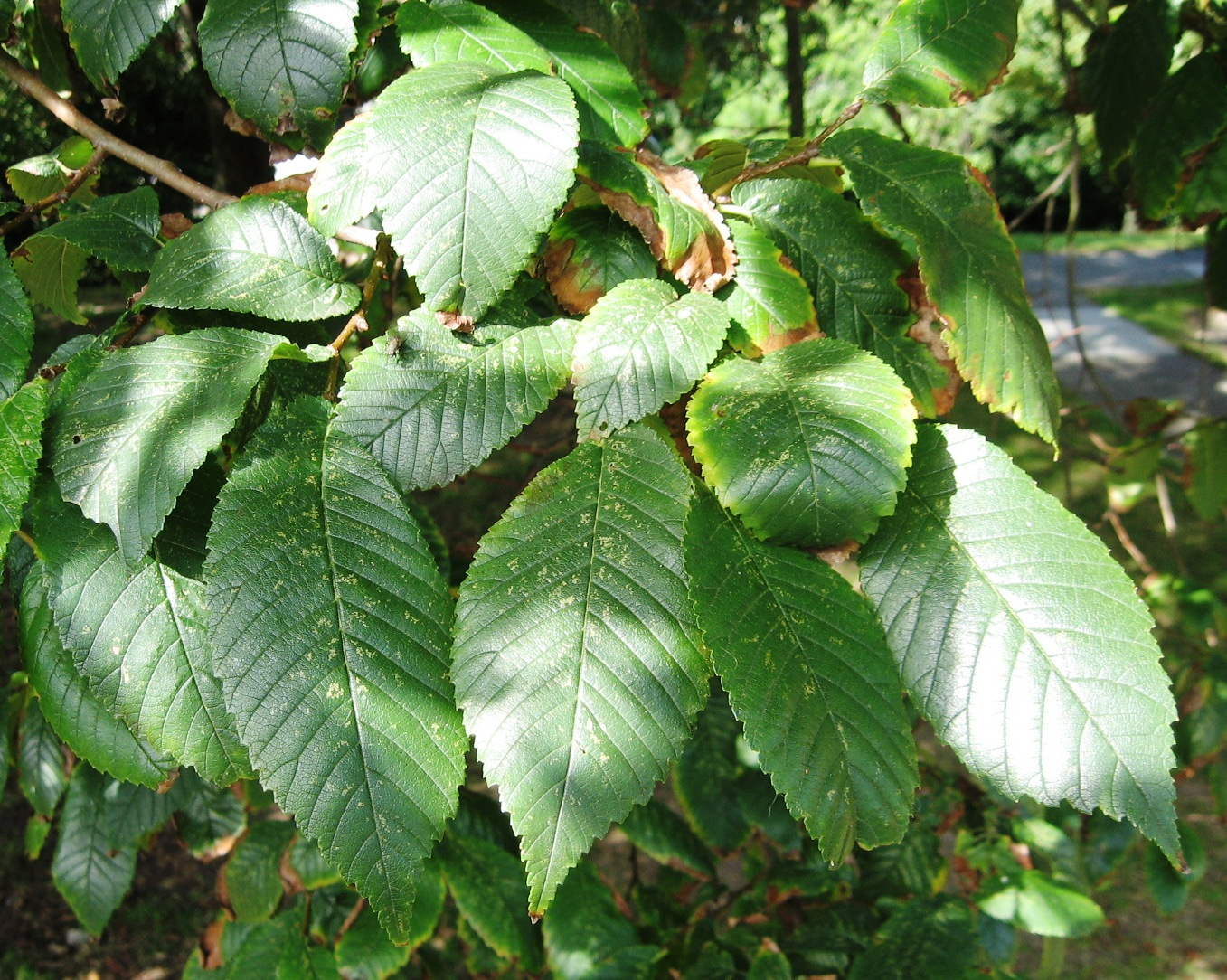
Ulmus leaves, Tenantry Rd, Brighton

== Cultivars ==
- 'Improved Coolshade'

== Accessions ==
=== North America ===
- Arnold Arboretum, US. Acc. no. 561–48
