= Oomyzus =

Scientific classification
- Kingdom: Animalia
- Phylum: Arthropoda
- Class: Insecta
- Order: Hymenoptera
- Family: Eulophidae
- Subfamily: Tetrastichinae
- Genus: Oomyzus; Rondani, 1870

Type species
- Oomyzus gallerucae (Fonscolombe, 1832)

Species
- 27 species

Genus of wasps

Oomyzus is a genus of hymenopteran insects of the family Eulophidae.
