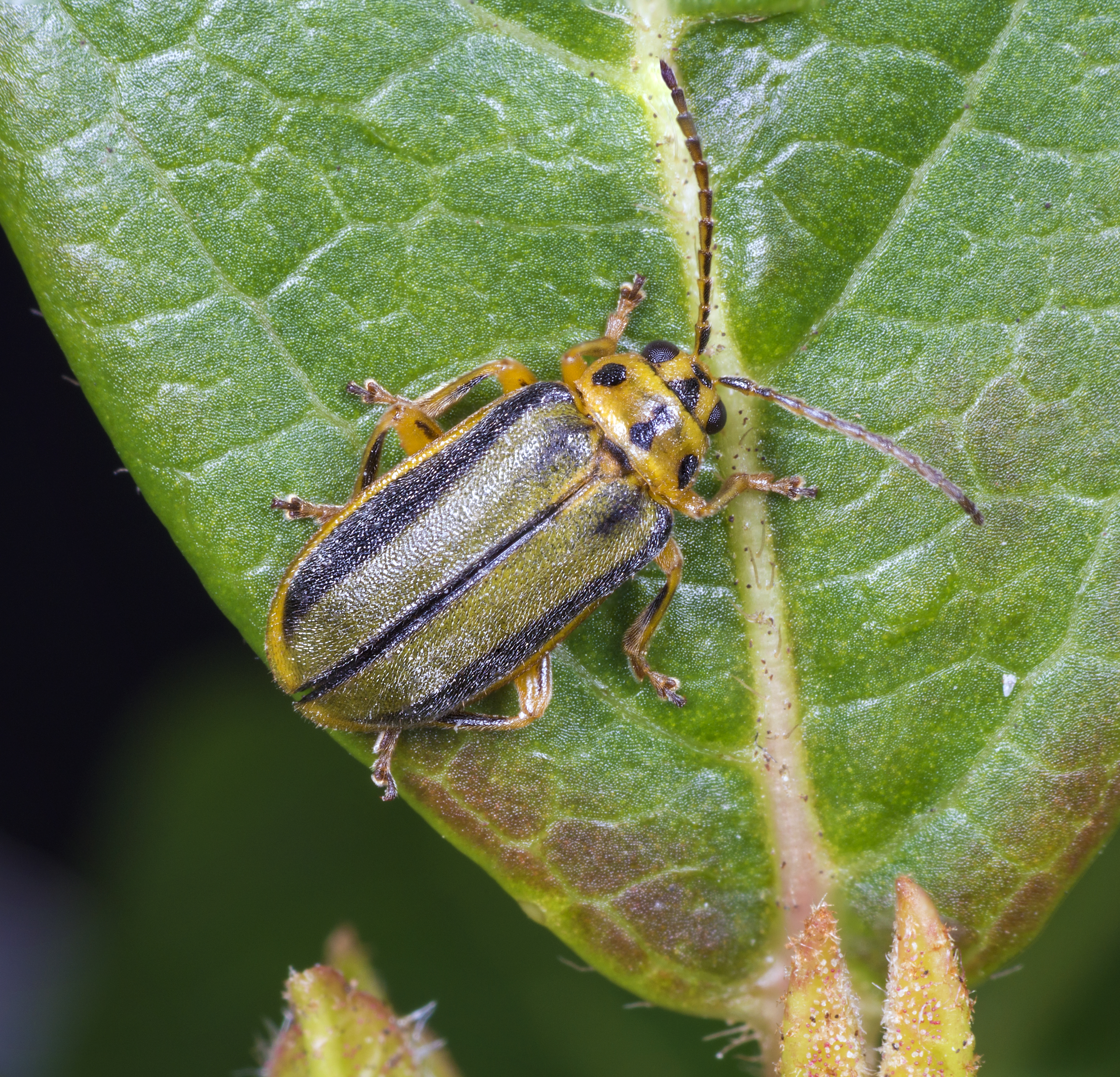
- Xanthogaleruca luteola

Scientific classification
- Kingdom: Animalia
- Phylum: Arthropoda
- Clade: Pancrustacea
- Class: Insecta
- Order: Coleoptera
- Suborder: Polyphaga
- Infraorder: Cucujiformia
- Family: Chrysomelidae
- Subfamily: Galerucinae
- Tribe: Galerucini
- Genus: Xanthogaleruca; Laboissière, 1934

= Xanthogaleruca =

Genus of beetles

Xanthogaleruca is a genus of beetles belonging to the family Chrysomelidae. These elm leaf beetles are pests that feed on ornamental plants until they are stripped of their leaves entirely.

== Species ==
The genus includes the following species:

- Xanthogaleruca aenescens (Fairmaire, 1878)
- Xanthogaleruca flavescens (Weise, 1887)
- Xanthogaleruca luteola (O.F. Müller, 1776)
- Xanthogaleruca maculicollis (Motschulsky, 1854)
- Xanthogaleruca nigromarginata (Jacoby, 1885)
- Xanthogaleruca orientalis (Ogloblin, 1936)
- Xanthogaleruca seminigra (Jacoby, 1885)
- Xanthogaleruca subaenea (Ogloblin, 1936)
- Xanthogaleruca subcoerulescens (Weise, 1884)
- Xanthogaleruca yuae Lee & Bezděk, 2021
