= Ulmus 'Hamburg' =

Elm cultivar

- Genus: Ulmus
- Cultivar: 'Hamburg'
- Origin: US

The hybrid elm cultivar Ulmus 'Hamburg' was originally raised by the Plumfield Nurseries, Fremont, Nebraska, circa 1932, after its discovery by Mr. Lloyd Moffet in a bed of Siberian Elm Ulmus pumila seedlings from Tekamah. It was later marketed by Interstate Nurseries, Hamburg, Iowa, from 1948, as 'Interstate's New Hamburg Hybrid Elm'. Green stated that it was originally said be a hybrid of Ulmus pumila (female parent) and Ulmus americana, but the Hamburg Nurseries of Iowa made no such claim for it in their catalogues from 1948 onwards. It is now considered more likely that Ulmus rubra was the male parent, as it was also known as 'Hybrid Chinese elm', and therefore probably synonymous with Plumfield Nurseries' 'Hybrid elm' of the same date, a known crossing of U. pumila and U. rubra, – and so, perhaps, also synonymous with Ulmus × intermedia 'Fremont', an elm of the same parentage found a little later in Plumfield Nurseries.

An U. pumila × U. rubra parentage would, by present classification, make the cultivar Ulmus × intermedia 'Hamburg' .

A similar erroneously conjectured crossing with U. americana occurred at Plumfield Nurseries in the 1930s, with their so-called "Wheatley hybrid elm" (apparently not the European 'Wheatley'), briefly marketed in 1934: "Our variety, an attractive round-headed rapid growing tree, with medium sized glossy leaves; originally imported from Holland and hybridized with American white elm, Ulmus americana ".

== Description ==
'Hamburg' has been described as a hardy, very rapid grower, with much stronger branching than the Siberian Elm. Hamburg Nurseries described it as "a shapely tree with large, dark green leaves". Leaves 3 to 4.5 inches long, 1.5 to 2 inches wide.

== Pests and diseases ==
'Hamburg' had not (by 1995) been widely tested for resistance to Dutch elm disease.

== Cultivation ==
Largely confined to the United States, several were introduced to the UK. A tree in Exeter University Botanic Gardens, Exeter, Devon, however, at one time listed as 'Hamburg Hybrid' (TROBI Champion, 17 m high, 55 cm d.b.h.), has since been found to be Ulmus laevis. 'Hamburg' is not known to have been introduced to Australasia.

== Notable trees ==
Two well-grown specimens, planted in 1953 and therefore among the earliest specimens sourced from the Hamburg Nurseries, stand (2022) in Arnold Arboretum, Massachusetts, USA.

== Synonymy ==
- 'Hamburg Hybrid Elm': Interstate Nurseries, Hamburg, Iowa, Catalogue, Spring 1949.
- 'Hybrid Chinese elm': Plumfield Nurseries, Fremont, Nebraska.

== Accessions ==
North America

- Arnold Arboretum, US. Acc. nos. 520–53, 666–50.
