= Ulmus elliptica =

Scientific classification (disputed)
- Kingdom: Plantae
- Clade: Tracheophytes
- Clade: Angiosperms
- Clade: Eudicots
- Clade: Rosids
- Order: Rosales
- Family: Ulmaceae
- Genus: Ulmus
- Species: U. elliptica

Binomial name
- Ulmus elliptica K.Koch

Synonyms
- Ulmus Heyderi Späth (disputed)

Species of elm

Ulmus elliptica Koch (named for the elliptic samara) is a disputed species of elm, native to the Caucasus, where Koch reported (1849, 1872) that it formed extensive woods, and ranging north to southern Ukraine. The tree reminded Koch of the elm then called Ulmus major Smith, except in its samara. Others thought it closely related to U. glabra, but to resemble U. rubra in its samara (see Description below). Many authorities consider U. elliptica Koch just a regional form of U. glabra, though Henry, Bean and Krüssman list the Caucasus tree as a species in its own right. (Note: U. elliptica is discussed under the U. fulva heading in Elwes & Henry (1913).) U. elliptica Koch is likewise distinguished from U. scabra Mill. [:U. glabra Huds.] in some Armenian and Russian plant lists.

For a time, the Späth nursery, Berlin, distributed a disputed cultivar, U. Heyderi, as a synonym of U. elliptica Koch (see Cultivation below).

== Description ==
U. elliptica, in Koch's description (1849), has smooth shoots, oblong acuminate double-toothed leaves unequal at base, with upper surface roughly hairy and lower covered with dense fine hairs, and a short petiole; clustered flowers on long stalks, with five-lobed fringed perianth and five stamens; and elliptic samara, not fringed with hairs, with pilose seed. Koch added that U. elliptica appeared "close to Ulmus major Smith, but differing in its elliptical samara with a hairy centre".

U. elliptica was said by Henry to resemble U. glabra in size, form, leaf, petiole and branchlets, but to resemble U. rubra in its samara, pubescent only over the seed. Henry noted one other difference from U. glabra – a smooth leaf – and two differences from U. rubra, the samara of the latter being "much smaller" than that of U. elliptica, and the branchlets of the latter having tubercles where those of U. elliptica are smooth. Bean added that U. elliptica differed from U. glabra in the "rusty hairs on the buds and the ciliate leaves" and from U. rubra in having less fissured bark, thinner and more sharply toothed leaves, and "more elongate" samarae. Krüssman gives the leaf-size of U. elliptica as 8–14 cm long.

== Pests and diseases ==
Unknown.

== Cultivation ==
U. Heyderi, Späth's cultivar name for U. elliptica Koch, appeared in the nursery's catalogues from 1882 as U. Heyderii (later changed to Heyderi), "a new elm from Turkestan". It was described as having "large, long, rough, downy leaves". One tree was planted in 1896 as U. elliptica, Koch; syns. U. Heyderi, Spaeth; U. sibirica, Hort., at the Dominion Arboretum, Ottawa, Canada. Späth supplied the Royal Botanic Garden Edinburgh in 1902 with three specimens each of U. fulva [:U. rubra] and U. Heyderi. The latter may survive in Edinburgh, as it was the practice of the Garden to distribute trees about the city (viz. the Wentworth Elm); the current list of Living Accessions held in the Garden per se does not list the plant. A tree listed as U. elliptica stood in the Ryston Hall arboretum, Norfolk, in the early 20th century.

Henry, stressing the differences between U. elliptica and U. rubra, held (1913) that Späth's U. Heyderi was, by some error, U. rubra. He believed that U. elliptica Koehne (1893) was described from Späth's U. Heyderi, not from the Caucasus species, and that the U. elliptica of Koehne (1893), of Schneider (1904), and of Ascherson and Graebner (1911), was U. fulva [: U. rubra]. Späth's 1903 catalogue, indeed, queried whether U. Heyderi was after all synonymous with U. elliptica Koch. By 1930 he had removed U. Heyderi from his catalogue but added U. elliptica Koch, as a tree from the Caucasus. Krussman (1983) concluded that the cultivation status of U. elliptica Koch / U. Heyderi was uncertain, since it had been confused with U. rubra. Green in his 'Registration of cultivar names in Ulmus' ignored U. Heyderi, as a species synonym.

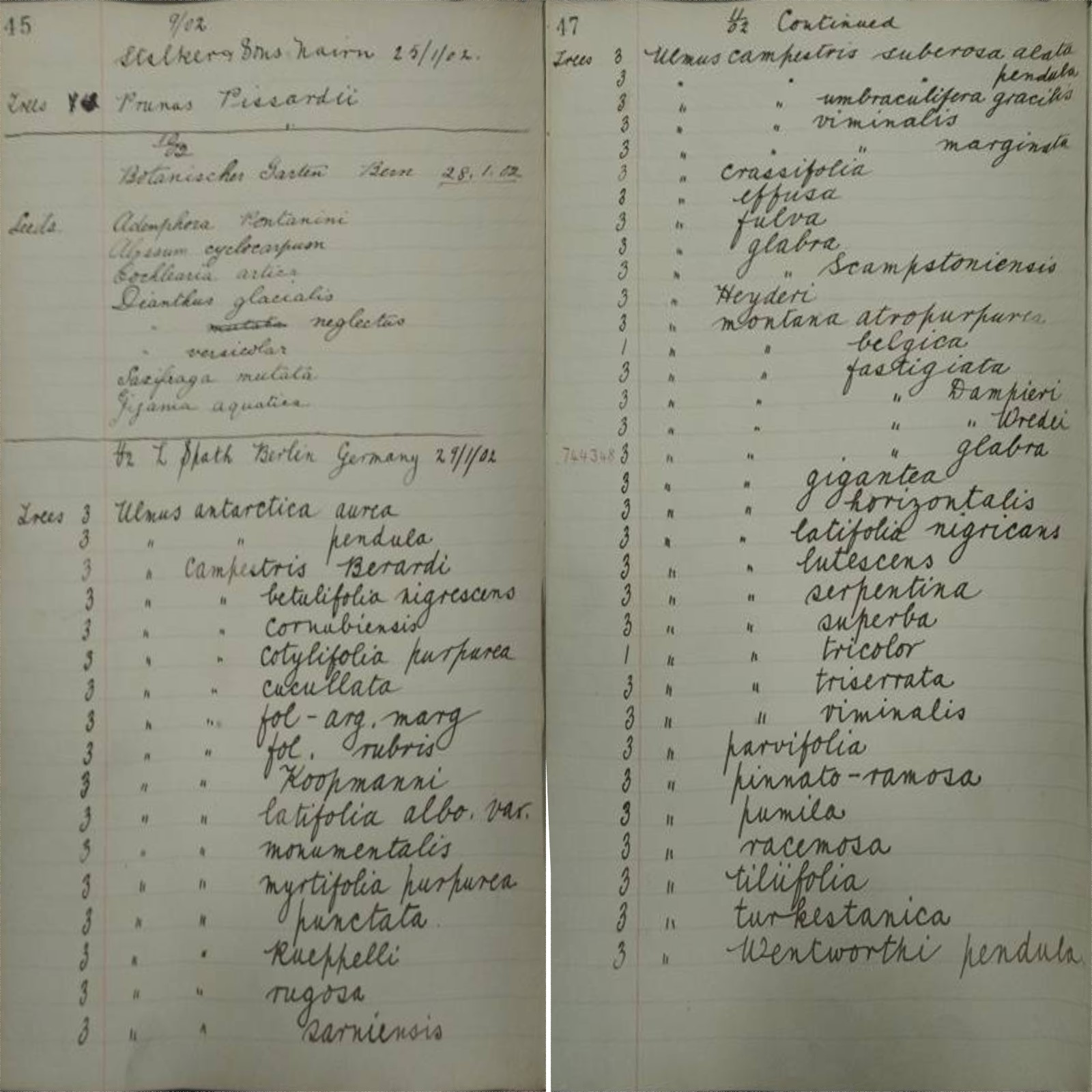
The RBGE 1902 accessions page showing separate entries for U. Heyderi and U. fulva [:U. rubra]

== Etymology ==
The origin of the cultivar name 'Heyderii' or 'Heyderi' is unknown, though the tree may be named for Eduard Heyder (1808-1884) of Berlin, remembered for Aloe heyderi.

== Synonymy ==
- Ulmus Heyderi Späth [disputed]

== Accessions ==
=== North America ===
- Dominion Arboretum, Ottawa, Ontario, Canada. Accession no. 2590
