= Oomyzus gallerucae =

Scientific classification
- Domain: Eukaryota
- Kingdom: Animalia
- Phylum: Arthropoda
- Class: Insecta
- Order: Hymenoptera
- Family: Eulophidae
- Genus: Oomyzus
- Species: O. gallerucae

Binomial name
- Oomyzus gallerucae (Fonscolombe, 1832)

Synonyms
- ? galerucae Fonscolombe; Eulophus galerucae (Fonscolombe); Eulophus gallerucae (Fonscolombe, 1832); Foersterella galerucae (Fonscolombe); Pteromalus gallerucae Fonscolombe, 1832; Tetracampe galerucae (Fonscolombe); Tetracampe gallerucae (Fonscolombe, 1832); Tetrastichus galerucae (Fonscolombe); Tetrastichus gallerucae (Fonscolombe, 1832)

Species of chalcid wasp

Oomyzus gallerucae is a species of chalcid wasp in the family Eulophidae. It is a parasitoid of the elm leaf beetle. The adults and larvae eat the eggs of the beetle.

The species can be found in countries like France, Iran, Australia, and the United States.
