= Ulmus × intermedia 'Willis' =

Elm cultivar

Ulmus × intermedia cultivar
- Hybrid parentage: U. pumila × U. rubra
- Cultivar: 'Willis'
- Origin: US

The hybrid elm cultivar Ulmus × intermedia 'Willis' originated as a crossing made by a Mr Minnick of Kansas. Almost certainly derived from a crossing of the Siberian Elm Ulmus pumila (female parent) and the Red Elm Ulmus rubra, it was originally believed that the male parent was the American elm Ulmus americana.

== Description ==
'Willis' was described as having a smooth grey bark, large leaves similar to U. americana, and capable of very rapid growth.

== Pests and diseases ==
In 1995 Santamour reported the cultivar "not widely tested for resistance to Dutch elm disease". Elowsky, Jordon-Thaden, and Kaul (2013) refer to more recent papers on the subject.

== Cultivation ==
First marketed by the Willis Nursery Co., Ottawa, Kansas, circa 1959, it is not known whether the cultivar remains in cultivation in the United States, nor whether it was ever introduced to Europe or Australasia.
