= Ulmus americana 'Pendula' =

Elm cultivar

- Species: Ulmus americana
- Cultivar: 'Pendula'
- Origin: England

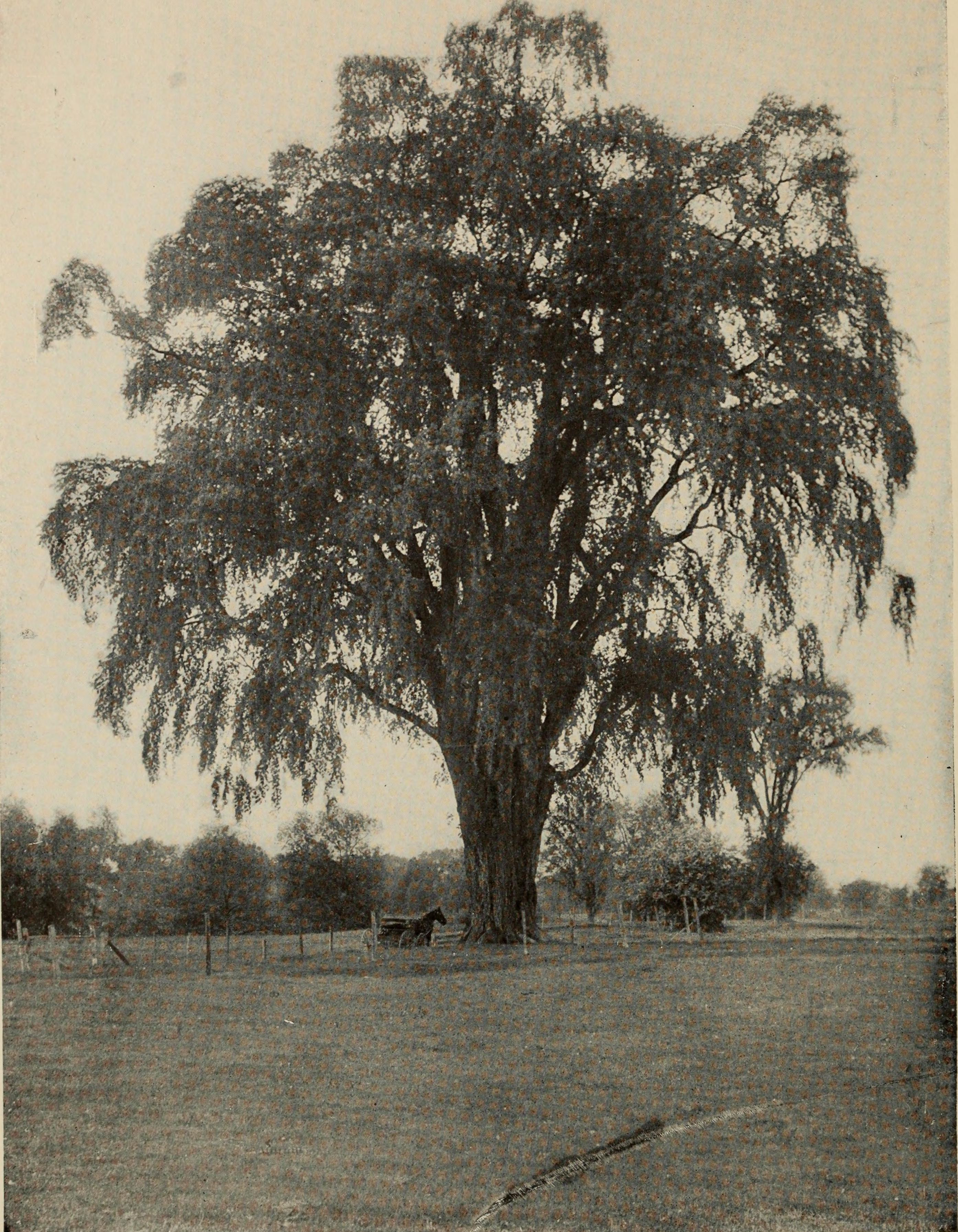
A pendulous form of American white elm, Lancaster, Massachusetts

The American elm cultivar Ulmus americana 'Pendula' was originally listed by William Aiton in Hort. Kew, 1: 320, 1789, as U. americana var. pendula, cloned in England in 1752 by James Gordon. From the 1880s the Späth nursery of Berlin supplied a cultivar at first listed as Ulmus fulva (Michx.) pendula Hort., which in their 1899 catalogue was queried as a possible variety of U. americana, and which thereafter appeared in their early 20th-century catalogues as U. americana pendula (formerly Ulmus fulva (Michx.) pendula Hort.). The Scampston Elm, Ulmus × hollandica 'Scampstoniensis', in cultivation on both sides of the Atlantic in the 19th and 20th centuries, was occasionally referred to as 'American Weeping Elm' or Ulmus americana pendula. This cultivar, however, was distinguished by Späth from his Ulmus americana pendula.

'Pendula' was considered probably just a forma by Green, who stated that it was later confused with a pendulous variant of an Ulmus glabra (see 'Synonymy'). At least one US nursery, however, stocked a clone. From 1932 to 1934 Plumfield Nurseries of Fremont, Nebraska, marketed, alongside the pyramidal Ulmus americana 'Moline' and the non-pendulous Ulmus americana 'Vase', an 'American Weeping Elm', "a weeping form of American elm, with long drooping branches".

== Description ==
The tree was described as vase-shaped with branches pendulous at their extremities.

== Cultivation ==
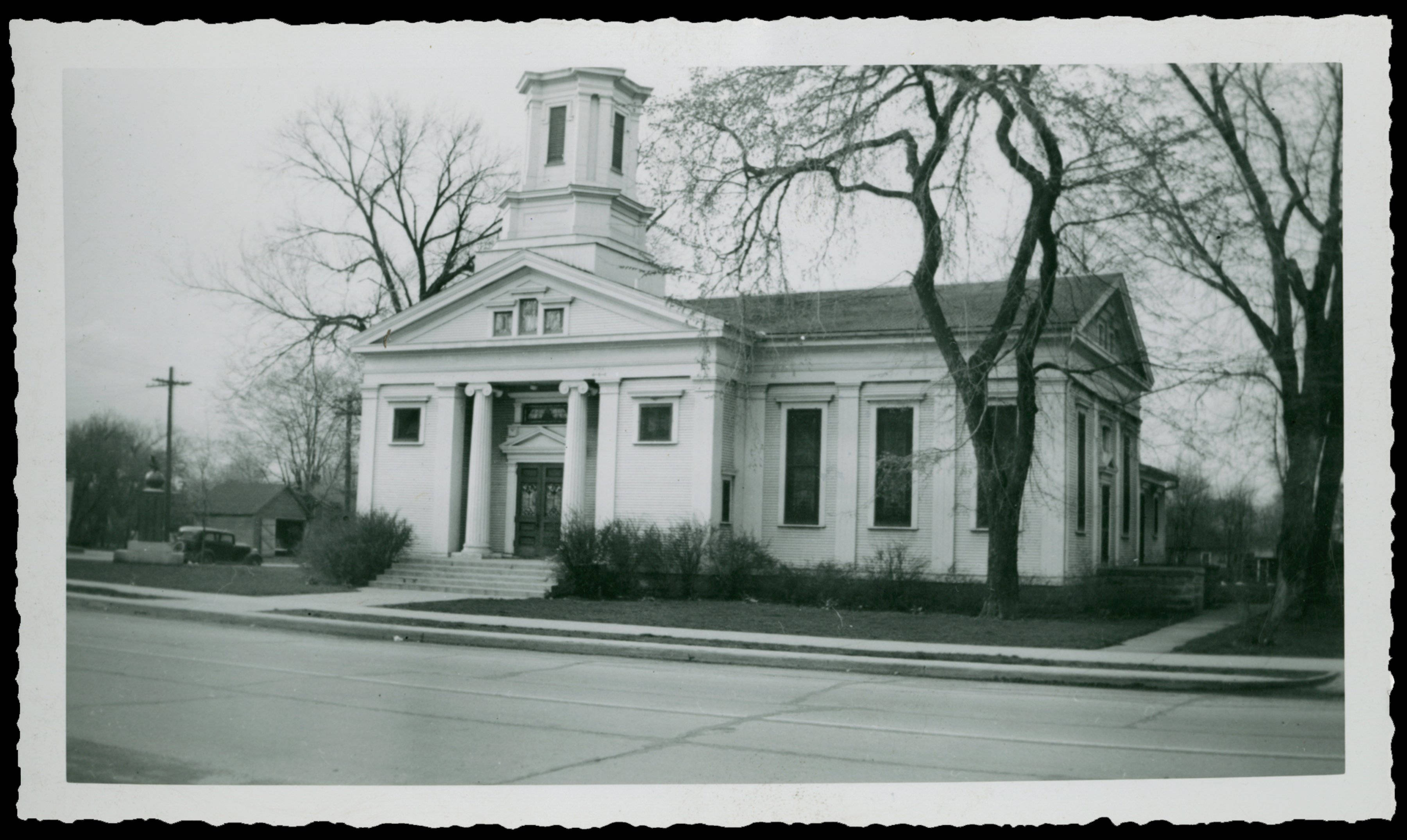
Weeping elm by Plymouth Congregational Church, Plainfield, Illinois (1941)

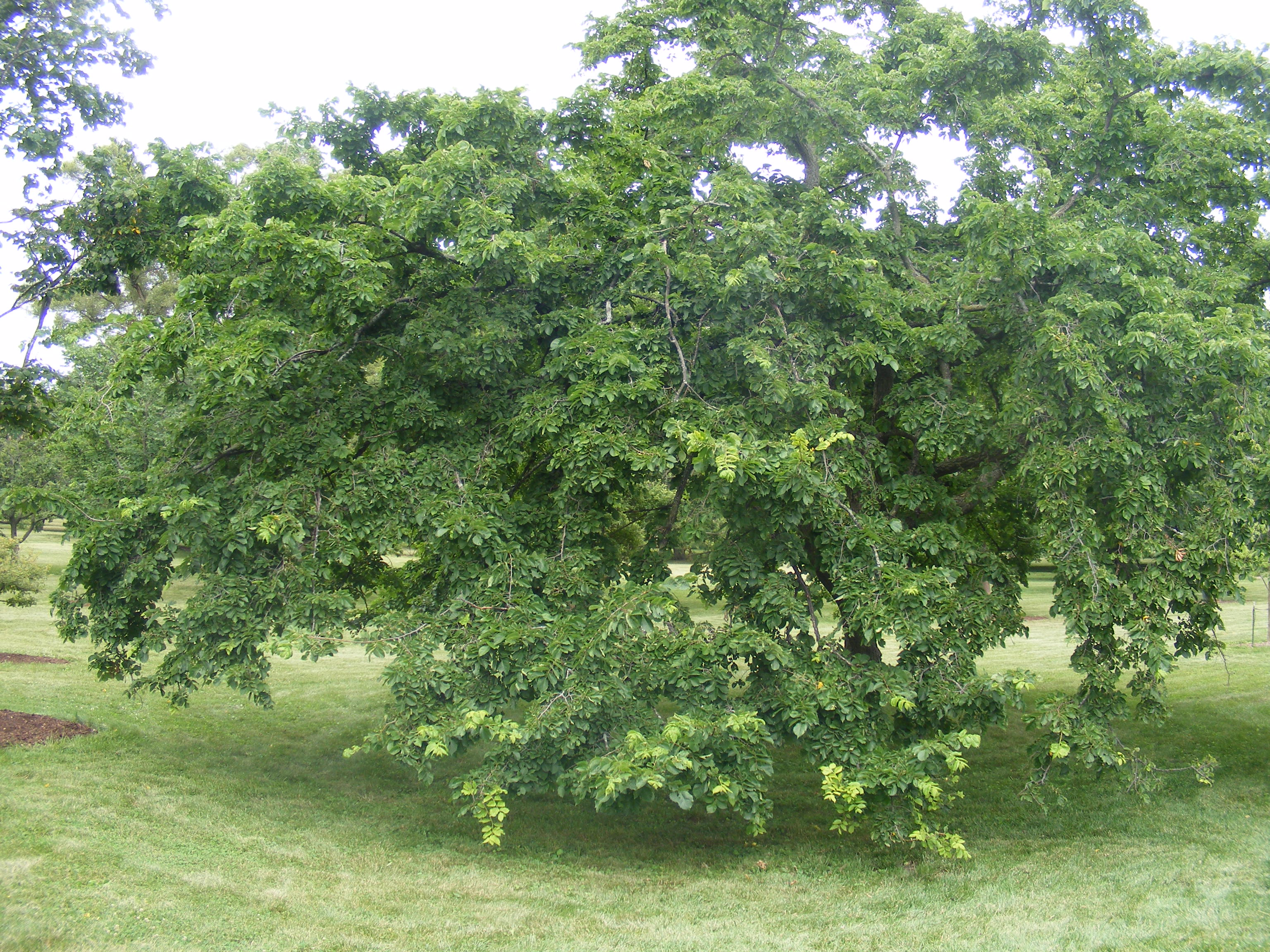
Morton Arboretum's Ulmus americana f. pendula (2009)

The U. americana pendula planted at the Dominion Arboretum, Ottawa, in 1889 may have been Späth's mis-named Ulmus fulva (Mchx) pendula, later corrected in arboretum lists, since Späth supplied many of the 1880s' and 1890s' elms there. Specimens from Späth were in cultivation in Europe, as Ulmus fulva (Mchx) pendula in the late 19th century, and as U. americana pendula in the 20th, to the 1930s. Henry (1913) described two at Kew obtained from Späth in 1896, considering them "probably not" Ulmus americana 'Beebe's Weeping', an 1889 cultivar which had at first also been mis-called Ulmus fulva (Mchx) pendula. 'Pendula' is known to have been cultivated in the UK (most recently in Ayrshire) and the Netherlands; no surviving trees have been confirmed (2016).

A striking low, horizontal-spreading American elm in Morton Arboretum, Illinois (near the main road to the east side), said by the Arboretum not to be 'Beebe's', is labelled as a forma, Ulmus americana f. pendula, reportedly cloned in 1970 from a weeping American elm growing in front of Plymouth Congregational Church, Plainfield, Illinois (see 'Accessions').

A clone cultivated in China as Ulmus americana 'Pendula', top-grafted on Ulmus pumila stock, is neither Ulmus americana nor Scampston elm (formerly mis-named Ulmus americana 'Pendula'), but, in the case of the majority of photographs on the Plant Photo Bank of China, a weeping form of U. glabra Huds., probably 'Camperdownii'.

== Hybrid cultivars ==
'Pendula' was used in the Dutch elm breeding programme before World War II, but none of the progeny were of particular note and are not known to have been cultivated

== Synonymy ==
- Ulmus americana var. glabra: Walpers, Ann. Bot. Syst. 3: 424, 1852.
- Ulmus fulva (Mchx) pendula Hort., Späth in error, 1880s to 1899 (see above)

== Accessions ==
=== North America ===
- Morton Arboretum, Illinois, US; acc. no. 678-70; as Ulmus americana f. pendula
