= Dick Thoenen =

American baseball player (1944–2023)

- Pitcher
- Born: January 9, 1944; Mexico, Missouri, U.S.
- Died: December 21, 2023 (aged 79)
- Batted: Right Threw: Right

MLB debut
- September 16, 1967, for the Philadelphia Phillies

Last MLB appearance
- September 16, 1967, for the Philadelphia Phillies

MLB statistics
- Innings pitched: 1
- Win–loss record: 0–0
- Earned run average: 9.00
- Strikeouts: 0
- Stats at Baseball Reference

Teams
- Philadelphia Phillies (1967)

Richard Crispin Thoenen (January 9, 1944 – December 21, 2023) was an American Major League Baseball pitcher who appeared for the Philadelphia Phillies in one game during its 1967 season. Thoenen died on December 21, 2023, at the age of 79.
