= 1967 Atlanta Braves season =

1967 Atlanta Braves
- League: National League
- Ballpark: Atlanta Stadium
- City: Atlanta
- Record: 75–88 (.475)
- League place: 8th
- Owners: William Bartholomay
- General managers: Paul Richards
- Managers: Billy Hitchcock
- Television: WSB-TV (Larry Munson, Ernie Johnson, Milo Hamilton, Dizzy Dean)
- Radio: WSB (Larry Munson, Ernie Johnson, Milo Hamilton)

The 1967 Atlanta Braves season was the Braves' second season in Atlanta and the 97th overall. The team went 77–85, as they suffered their first losing season since 1952, the franchise's final season in Boston. The seventh-place Braves finished 24 1/2 games behind the National League and World Series Champion St. Louis Cardinals.

== Offseason ==
- November 28, 1966: Ramón Hernández was drafted by the Braves from the California Angels in the 1966 rule 5 draft.
- November 29, 1966: Bill Robinson and Chi-Chi Olivo were traded by the Braves to the New York Yankees for Clete Boyer.
- November 29, 1966: Mike Page was drafted by the Braves from the Boston Red Sox in the 1966 minor league draft.
- December 1966: John Herrnstein and Chris Cannizzaro were traded by the Braves to the Boston Red Sox for Julio Navarro and Ed Rakow.
- December 31, 1966: Eddie Mathews, Arnold Umbach and a player to be named later were traded by the Braves to the Houston Astros for Dave Nicholson and Bob Bruce. The Braves completed the deal by sending Sandy Alomar Sr. to the Astros on February 25, 1967.

== Regular season ==
=== Season standings ===
National League
Team	W	L	Pct.	GB	Home	Road
St. Louis Cardinals	101	60	.627	—	49‍–‍32	52‍–‍28
San Francisco Giants	91	71	.562	10½	51‍–‍31	40‍–‍40
Chicago Cubs	87	74	.540	14	49‍–‍34	38‍–‍40
Cincinnati Reds	87	75	.537	14½	49‍–‍32	38‍–‍43
Philadelphia Phillies	82	80	.506	19½	45‍–‍35	37‍–‍45
Pittsburgh Pirates	81	81	.500	20½	49‍–‍32	32‍–‍49
Atlanta Braves	77	85	.475	24½	48‍–‍33	29‍–‍52
Los Angeles Dodgers	73	89	.451	28½	42‍–‍39	31‍–‍50
Houston Astros	69	93	.426	32½	46‍–‍35	23‍–‍58
New York Mets	61	101	.377	40½	36‍–‍42	25‍–‍59

=== Record vs. opponents ===
1967 National League record Sources:
Team	ATL	CHC	CIN	HOU	LAD	NYM	PHI	PIT	SF	STL
Atlanta	—	11–7	5–13	11–7	8–10	8–10	10–8	8–10	10–8	6–12
Chicago	7–11	—	12–6	8–10	9–9	13–5	11–7	11–7–1	10–8	6–11
Cincinnati	13–5	6–12	—	15–3	8–10	12–6	10–8	10–8	8–10	5–13
Houston	7–11	10–8	3–15	—	10–8	11–7	7–11	9–9	6–12	6–12
Los Angeles	10–8	9–9	10–8	8–10	—	12–6	6–12	7–11	5–13	6–12
New York	10–8	5–13	6–12	7–11	6–12	—	4–14	11–7	5–13	7–11
Philadelphia	8-10	7–11	8–10	11–7	12–6	14–4	—	8–10	8–10	6–12
Pittsburgh	10–8	7–11–1	8–10	9–9	11–7	7–11	10–8	—	8–10	11–7
San Francisco	8–10	8–10	10–8	12–6	13–5	13–5	10–8	10–8	—	7–11
St. Louis	12–6	11–6	13–5	12–6	12–6	11–7	12–6	7–11	11–7	—

=== Managerial turnover ===
The Braves' worst season since 1952—their last year in their original home of Boston—cost manager Billy Hitchcock his job on September 28, 1967; the team stood at 77–82 (.484) and 21 1/2 games in arrears of the eventual 1967 World Champion St. Louis Cardinals at the time. Bullpen coach Ken Silvestri took over the club for the final three games of the season (all losses) on an interim basis.

Hitchcock's firing enabled general manager Paul Richards, on the job in Atlanta for only 13 months, to name his own man as skipper for 1968, and he chose a veteran associate, Luman Harris, 52, as Hitchcock's permanent successor. Harris had played with Richards with the minor league Atlanta Crackers in the 1930s, and coached for Richards with three MLB clubs; he had also managed under GM Richards with the 1965 Houston Astros. Harris had been the 1967 skipper of the Triple-A Richmond Braves, and had led them to the best record in the International League.

=== Notable transactions ===
- June 6, 1967: Gene Oliver was traded by the Braves to the Philadelphia Phillies for Bob Uecker.
- June 15, 1967: Wade Blasingame was traded by the Braves to the Houston Astros for Claude Raymond.

=== Roster ===
1967 Atlanta Braves
Roster
Pitchers: 36 Wade Blasingame; 39 Jim Britton; 42 Bob Bruce; 20 Clay Carroll; 40 Tony Cloninger; 24 Ramón Hernández; 33 Pat Jarvis; 30 Ken Johnson; 22 Dick Kelley; 23 Denny Lemaster; 35 Phil Niekro; 27 Ed Rakow; 36 Claude Raymond; 38 Ron Reed; 26 Jay Ritchie; 37 Don Schwall; 32 George Stone; 34 Cecil Upshaw	Catchers: 12 Gene Oliver; 15 Joe Torre; 12 Bob Uecker; Infielders: 29 Felipe Alou; 6 Clete Boyer; 7 Mike de la Hoz; 11 Tito Francona; 49 Remy Hermoso; 2 Marty Martínez; 19 Denis Menke; 11 Félix Millán; 14 Woody Woodward	Outfielders: 44 Hank Aaron; 43 Rico Carty; 27 Ty Cline; 25 Cito Gaston; 31 Gary Geiger; 48 Mack Jones; 42 Mike Lum; 47 Dave Nicholson; Other batters: 28 Jim Beauchamp; 32 Glen Clark; 10 Charley Lau	Manager: 8 Billy Hitchcock; Coaches: 9 Bill Adair; 4 Bob Kennedy; 3 Ken Silvestri; 5 Whit Wyatt

== Player stats ==
=== Batting ===
==== Starters by position ====
Note: Pos = Position; G = Games played; AB = At bats; H = Hits; Avg. = Batting average; HR = Home runs; RBI = Runs batted in

Pos	Player	G	AB	H	Avg.	HR	RBI
C	Joe Torre	135	477	132	.277	20	68
1B	Felipe Alou	140	574	157	.274	15	43
2B	Woody Woodward	136	429	97	.226	0	25
SS	Denis Menke	129	418	95	.227	7	39
3B	Clete Boyer	154	572	140	.245	26	96
LF	Rico Carty	134	444	113	.255	15	64
CF	Mack Jones	140	454	115	.253	17	50
RF	Hank Aaron	155	600	184	.307	39	109

==== Other batters ====
Note: G = Games played; AB = At bats; H = Hits; Avg. = Batting average; HR = Home runs; RBI = Runs batted in

Player	G	AB	H	Avg.	HR	RBI
Tito Francona	82	254	63	.248	6	25
Bob Uecker	62	158	23	.146	3	13
Mike de la Hoz	74	143	29	.203	3	14
Félix Millán	41	136	32	.235	2	6
Gary Geiger	69	117	19	.162	1	5
Marty Martínez	44	73	21	.288	0	5
Gene Oliver	17	51	10	.196	3	6
Charley Lau	52	45	9	.200	1	5
Remy Hermoso	11	26	8	.308	0	0
Mike Lum	9	26	6	.231	0	1
Dave Nicholson	10	25	5	.200	0	1
Cito Gaston	9	25	3	.120	0	1
Ty Cline	10	8	0	.000	0	0
Glen Clark	4	4	0	.000	0	0
Jim Beauchamp	4	3	0	.000	0	1

=== Pitching ===
==== Starting pitchers ====
Note: G = Games pitched; IP = Innings pitched; W = Wins; L = Losses; ERA = Earned run average; SO = Strikeouts

Player	G	IP	W	L	ERA	SO
Denny Lemaster	31	215.1	9	9	3.34	148
Ken Johnson	29	210.1	13	9	2.74	85
Pat Jarvis	32	194.0	15	10	3.66	118
Tony Cloninger	16	76.2	4	7	5.17	55
Ron Reed	3	21.1	1	1	2.45	11
Jim Britton	2	13.1	0	2	6.08	4

==== Other pitchers ====
Note: G = Games pitched; IP = Innings pitched; W = Wins; L = Losses; ERA = Earned run average; SO = Strikeouts

Player	G	IP	W	L	ERA	SO
Phil Niekro	46	207.0	11	9	1.87	129
Dick Kelley	39	98.0	2	9	3.77	75
Clay Carroll	42	93.0	6	12	5.52	35
Ed Rakow	17	39.1	3	2	5.26	25
Bob Bruce	12	38.2	2	3	4.89	22
Wade Blasingame	10	25.1	1	0	4.62	20
George Stone	2	7.1	0	0	4.91	5

==== Relief pitchers ====
Note: G = Games pitched; W = Wins; L = Losses; SV = Saves; ERA = Earned run average; SO = Strikeouts

Player	G	W	L	SV	ERA	SO
Cecil Upshaw	30	2	3	9	2.58	31
Jay Ritchie	52	4	6	2	3.17	57
Ramón Hernández	46	0	2	5	4.18	28
Claude Raymond	28	4	1	4	2.62	14
Don Schwall	1	0	0	0	0.00	0

== Farm system ==
Level	Team	League	Manager
AAA	Richmond Braves	International League	Lum Harris
AA	Austin Braves	Texas League	Hub Kittle
A	Kinston Eagles	Carolina League	Andy Pafko
A	West Palm Beach Braves	Florida State League	Eddie Haas
A	Lexington Braves	Western Carolinas League	Buddy Hicks
A-Short Season	Jamestown Braves	New York–Penn League	Harry Dorish
Rookie	GCL Braves	Gulf Coast League	Tom Saffell
