= Norm Gigon =

American baseball player (1938–2013)

- Infielder / Outfielder
- Born: May 12, 1938; Hackensack, New Jersey, U.S.
- Died: April 1, 2013 (aged 74); Mahwah, New Jersey, U.S.
- Batted: Right Threw: Right

MLB debut
- April 12, 1967, for the Chicago Cubs

Last MLB appearance
- October 1, 1967, for the Chicago Cubs

MLB statistics
- Batting average: .171
- Home runs: 1
- Runs batted in: 6
- Stats at Baseball Reference

Teams
- Chicago Cubs (1967)

Norman Phillip Gigon (May 12, 1938 – April 1, 2013) was an American Major League Baseball utility player who played for the Chicago Cubs in 1967.

Gigon hit one home run in his short career. It came off Juan Pizarro in a game against the Pittsburgh Pirates on April 23, 1967.

In addition to playing pro baseball, Gigon received degrees from both Colby College and Rhode Island University.

Immediately after retiring from pro baseball at the end of the 1967 season, Gigon took the job of baseball coach at Lafayette College.

He was born in Hackensack, New Jersey and died in Mahwah, New Jersey.
