= Dick Hall (baseball) =

American baseball player (1930–2023)

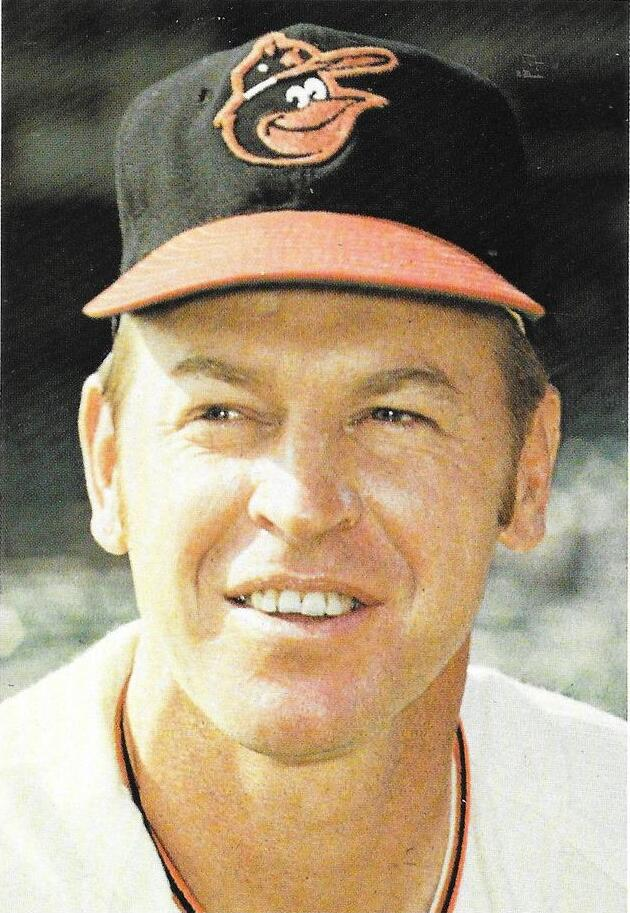
- Hall in 1971
- Pitcher / Outfielder
- Born: September 27, 1930; St. Louis, Missouri, U.S.
- Died: June 18, 2023 (aged 92); Timonium, Maryland, U.S.
- Batted: Right Threw: Right

MLB debut
- April 15, 1952, for the Pittsburgh Pirates

Last MLB appearance
- September 25, 1971, for the Baltimore Orioles

MLB statistics
- Win–loss record: 93–75
- Earned run average: 3.32
- Strikeouts: 741
- Saves: 71
- Batting average: .210
- Stats at Baseball Reference

Teams
- Pittsburgh Pirates (1952–1957, 1959); Kansas City Athletics (1960); Baltimore Orioles (1961–1966); Philadelphia Phillies (1967–1968); Baltimore Orioles (1969–1971)

Career highlights and awards
- 2× World Series champion (1966, 1970); Baltimore Orioles Hall of Fame

Richard Wallace Hall (September 27, 1930 – June 18, 2023) was an American professional baseball player who appeared in 669 games over 19 seasons in Major League Baseball, first as an outfielder, then as a pitcher, from 1952 through 1957 and from 1959 through 1971. Hall is best known as a member of the Baltimore Orioles dynasty that won four American League pennants and two World Series championships between 1966 and 1971. He also played for the Pittsburgh Pirates, Kansas City Athletics and Philadelphia Phillies. The 6 ft 6 in (1.98 m), 200 lb (91 kg) Hall batted and threw right-handed. He earned the nickname "Turkey" due to his unusual pitching motion.

== Early life ==
Hall was born on September 27, 1930, in St. Louis. His father David Hall was an engineer, originally constructing bridges, but was later an aerospace engineer. His mother Helen Hall was a University of Vermont honors graduate. At five months old, the family moved to Albany, New York, where they lived for five years. Hall spent most of his childhood in Haworth, New Jersey.

He was educated at what is now Northfield Mount Hermon School, a college-preparatory school in Massachusetts, and graduated from Swarthmore College, where he earned a degree in economics. He was also a five-sport athlete at Swarthmore (football, soccer, track and field, baseball and basketball) and was inducted into the school's Garnet Athletics Hall of Fame in its inaugural class of 2012. He held multiple baseball records and a long jump record at Swarthmore. He was the older brother of linguist Barbara Partee, also a Swarthmore graduate.

== Professional career ==
Hall was heavily scouted by major league teams while playing at Swarthmore College, ultimately choosing to sign with Branch Rickey and the Pittsburgh, Pirates.

=== Outfielder ===
Hall started his MLB career in 1952 with the Pittsburgh Pirates as an outfielder. After short trials during that season and in 1953, he spent all of 1954 on the Pittsburgh roster, and started 84 of the club's 154 games: 32 in left field, 43 in center, and nine in right. However, he batted only .239 with 74 hits, two home runs and 27 runs batted in.

=== Pitcher ===
==== Pittsburgh Pirates organization ====
The following year, 1955, he began his transition to the pitcher's mound, going 12–5 with 16 complete games and a 2.24 earned run average for the Lincoln Chiefs of the Western League. Recalled by Pittsburgh in midseason, he won the first MLB game he ever pitched, a 12–5 triumph over the Chicago Cubs at Forbes Field on July 24, but later started two games in center field, on July 29–30 against the Cincinnati Redlegs at Crosley Field.

Hall would pitch in 15 games, with 13 starts, and compile a creditable 6–6 (3.91) record for a team that finished last in the National League and dropped 94 games overall. Then, in 1956, he appeared in 33 games for the Pirates, 19 on the mound and 14 as a pinch hitter or first baseman. He lost all seven pitching decisions, but hit .500 (six for 12) in the pinch and .345 overall.

He became exclusively a pitcher in 1957 but, battling a sore arm, he spent most of the season with Triple-A Columbus, then all of 1958 on the sidelines, with hepatitis. He returned to action in 1959, and at age 28 had a breakthrough season in the Triple-A Pacific Coast League with the Salt Lake City Bees, winning 18 games, earning an MVP award and September recall to Pittsburgh.

==== Kansas City Athletics ====
On December 9, 1959, during the interleague trading period just put into effect, the Pirates traded Hall, Ken Hamlin and Hank Foiles to the Kansas City Athletics for catcher/utilityman Hal Smith. In Hall's first season in the American League, working for another cellar-dwelling team, he started 28 games and went 8–13, but his 1821/3 innings pitched and nine complete games were third among A's pitchers (behind Bud Daley and Ray Herbert). His 4.05 earned run average outperformed the staff ERA by 0.33.

==== Baltimore Orioles and Philadelphia Phillies ====
As the 1961 season was about to begin, Hall was acquired by the Orioles along with Dick Williams for Chuck Essegian and Jerry Walker on April 12. He transitioned from a starting pitcher into a spot starter and relief pitcher who was paired with relief aces Hoyt Wilhelm (1961–1962) and then Stu Miller (1963–1966). Hall's best season came in 1964, when he pitched 872/3 innings with a WHIP of 0.844 and an ERA of 1.85. For the Orioles from 1962 to 1966, he led all major leaguers pitching over 150 innings, with a strikeout to walk ratio of 4.6, walking only 1.3 batters per nine innings. In 1963, over a five-game period, Hall got 28 consecutive hitters out.

Hall helped the Orioles win the 1966 and 1970 World Series and 1969 and 1971 American League pennant. His Baltimore tenure was interrupted by two years (1967–1968) back in the National League as a key member of the Philadelphia Phillies' bullpen. He had been traded from the Orioles to the Phillies on 15 December 1966 in a transaction that was completed one year later when John Morris was sent to Baltimore on 18 December 1967. After a stellar 1967 season (ten wins, nine saves, and a 2.20 ERA), he slumped in 1968, and when the Phillies released him on October 29, the Orioles signed him as a free agent in 1969 after a spring training trial. Hall rebounded to win 21 games and save ten others for three consecutive pennant-winning Oriole teams through 1971.

In his postseason career with the Orioles, Hall pitched in the American League Championship series in 1969 and 1970 (against the Minnesota Twins) and 1971 (against the Oakland Athletics) and in the World Series in 1969 (against the New York Mets) and 1970 (against the Cincinnati Reds). He had a 2–1 record and 2 saves in 82/3 innings, without giving up an earned run. Overall, he played nine years for the Orioles with a 2.89 ERA, 65 wins, and 60 saves.

=== Career statistics ===
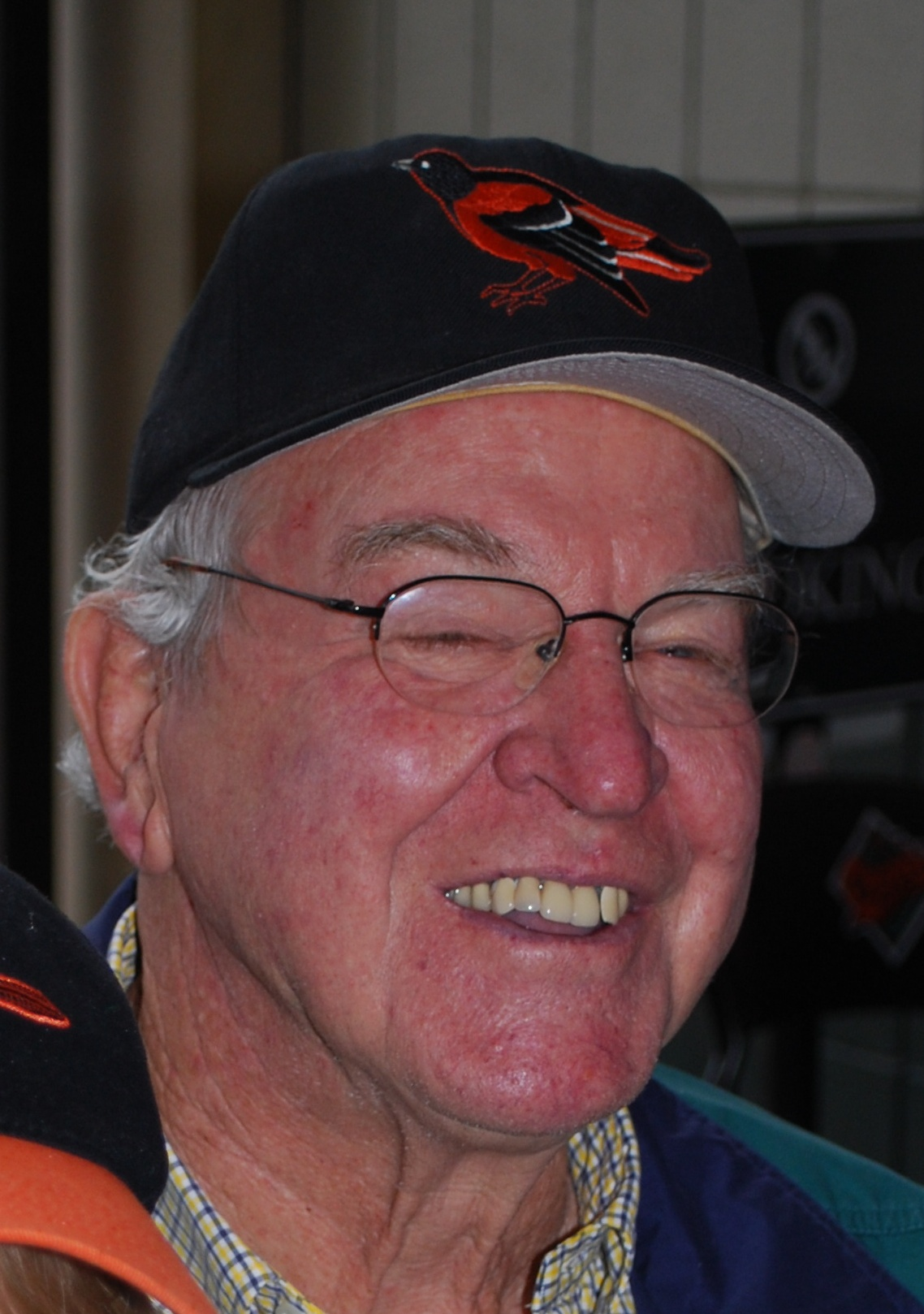
Hall in 2010

In 495 MLB games pitched over 16 years, Hall compiled a 93–75 win–loss record, 74 games started, 20 complete games, three shutouts, 237 games finished, 68 saves, 1,2592/3 innings pitched, 1,152 hits allowed, 512 runs allowed, 464 earned runs allowed, 130 home runs allowed, 236 walks allowed, 741 strikeouts, 18 hit batsmen, one wild pitch, 70 intentional walks, a 3.32 ERA, and 5,085 batters faced.

As a hitter, in 669 games Hall had 714 at bats, 79 runs, 150 hits, 15 doubles, four triples, four home runs, 56 RBI, six stolen bases, 61 walks, .210 batting average, .271 on-base percentage, .259 slugging percentage, 185 total bases, 34 sacrifice hits and nine sacrifice flies. He struck out 147 times and collected 61 walks. He was an occasional pinch hitter through 1966 and batted .257 in 35 at bats in that role.

== Legacy and honors ==
Hall was the first pitcher to record a win in League Championship Series play, on October 4, 1969. In 1970 and 1971, he was the oldest player in the American League.

The last home run Hall surrendered was to Japanese baseball legend Sadaharu Oh, during the Orioles post-season exhibition baseball tour of Japan in 1971.

He is tied for 26th with Rube Waddell on the MLB Career WHIP List (1.102), 40th on the MLB Career Walks per Nine Innings Pitched List (1.69) and 69th on the MLB Career Strikeout to Walk List (3.14).

The Orioles greatest pitcher, Hall of Famer Jim Palmer, who learned about pitching from Hall and considered him both a professional and life mentor, called Hall "One of the great control pitchers ever." Hall only walked 166 batters unintentionally over his career of 1,259.2 innings pitched, to go along with his single wild pitch. Palmer said of Hall's great control, "he could hit a little thimble on the outside corner...."

Hall won the Most Valuable Player award in the Pacific Coast League in 1959, after posting a 18–5 record and leading the PCL in wins, earned run average (1.87), and winning percentage (.783). He was inducted as a member of the Baltimore Oriole Hall of Fame in 1989.

== Personal life ==
The Pirates sent Hall to Mexico for winter baseball, and he met his future wife Maria Elena Nieto there in 1955. Hall also became fluent in Spanish.

Hall worked as an accountant during his playing years, and then continued to do so after retiring from baseball, until 2001. He got the second highest score on the three-day CPA exam out of two hundred test takers.

== Death ==
Hall died on June 18, 2023, in Timonium, Maryland, at the age of 92.
