= 1967 Philadelphia Phillies season =

Major League Baseball season

1967 Philadelphia Phillies
- League: National League
- Ballpark: Connie Mack Stadium
- City: Philadelphia
- Record: 82–80 (.506)
- League place: 5th
- Owners: R. R. M. Carpenter, Jr.
- General managers: John J. Quinn
- Managers: Gene Mauch
- Television: WFIL
- Radio: WFIL (By Saam, Bill Campbell, Richie Ashburn)

The 1967 Philadelphia Phillies season was the 85th season in the history of the franchise, and the 30th season for the Philadelphia Phillies at Connie Mack Stadium. It consisted of the Phillies' 82–80 finish, good for fifth place in the National League, 19 1/2 games behind the NL and World Series Champion St. Louis Cardinals. The Phillies would not finish above .500 again until 1975.

== Offseason ==
- November 28, 1966: Bo Belinsky was drafted from the Phillies by the Houston Astros in the 1966 rule 5 draft.
- November 30, 1966: Darold Knowles and cash were traded by the Phillies to the Washington Senators for Don Lock.
- December 10, 1966: Joe Verbanic and cash were traded by the Phillies to the New York Yankees for Pedro Ramos.
- December 21, 1966: Rubén Gómez was acquired by the Phillies from the Rojos del Águila de Veracruz.

== Regular season ==
=== Season standings ===
National League
Team	W	L	Pct.	GB	Home	Road
St. Louis Cardinals	101	60	.627	—	49‍–‍32	52‍–‍28
San Francisco Giants	91	71	.562	10½	51‍–‍31	40‍–‍40
Chicago Cubs	87	74	.540	14	49‍–‍34	38‍–‍40
Cincinnati Reds	87	75	.537	14½	49‍–‍32	38‍–‍43
Philadelphia Phillies	82	80	.506	19½	45‍–‍35	37‍–‍45
Pittsburgh Pirates	81	81	.500	20½	49‍–‍32	32‍–‍49
Atlanta Braves	77	85	.475	24½	48‍–‍33	29‍–‍52
Los Angeles Dodgers	73	89	.451	28½	42‍–‍39	31‍–‍50
Houston Astros	69	93	.426	32½	46‍–‍35	23‍–‍58
New York Mets	61	101	.377	40½	36‍–‍42	25‍–‍59

=== Record vs. opponents ===
1967 National League record Sources:
Team	ATL	CHC	CIN	HOU	LAD	NYM	PHI	PIT	SF	STL
Atlanta	—	11–7	5–13	11–7	8–10	8–10	10–8	8–10	10–8	6–12
Chicago	7–11	—	12–6	8–10	9–9	13–5	11–7	11–7–1	10–8	6–11
Cincinnati	13–5	6–12	—	15–3	8–10	12–6	10–8	10–8	8–10	5–13
Houston	7–11	10–8	3–15	—	10–8	11–7	7–11	9–9	6–12	6–12
Los Angeles	10–8	9–9	10–8	8–10	—	12–6	6–12	7–11	5–13	6–12
New York	10–8	5–13	6–12	7–11	6–12	—	4–14	11–7	5–13	7–11
Philadelphia	7–11	7–11	8–10	11–7	12–6	14–4	—	8–10	8–10	6–12
Pittsburgh	10–8	7–11–1	8–10	9–9	11–7	7–11	10–8	—	8–10	11–7
San Francisco	8–10	8–10	10–8	12–6	13–5	13–5	10–8	10–8	—	7–11
St. Louis	12–6	11–6	13–5	12–6	12–6	11–7	12–6	7–11	11–7	—

=== Notable transactions ===
- June 5, 1967: Pedro Ramos was released by the Phillies.
- June 6, 1967: Bob Uecker was traded by the Phillies to the Atlanta Braves for Gene Oliver.
- June 22, 1967: Dick Groat was purchased from the Phillies by the San Francisco Giants.

=== Game log ===
Legend
	Phillies win
	Phillies loss
	Postponement
**Bold**	Phillies team member

1967 Game Log
Overall Record: 82–80
April (8–8)

#	Date	Opponent	Score	Win	Loss	Save	Attendance	Record
1	April 11	@ Cubs	2–4	Ferguson Jenkins (1–0)	**Jim Bunning** (0–1)	None	16,462	0–1
2	April 12	@ Cubs	5–4 (11)	**Rick Wise** (1–0)	Rich Nye (0–1)	None	2,690	1–1
–	April 13	@ Cubs	Postponed (rain); Makeup: August 10					
3	April 14	Mets	5–1	**Chris Short** (1–0)	Jack Fisher (0–1)	None	26,649	2–1
4	April 15	Mets	6–2	**Jim Bunning** (1–1)	Bob Shaw (0–1)	None	5,195	3–1
5	April 16	Mets	2–0	**Larry Jackson** (1–0)	Bill Denehy (0–1)	None	9,213	4–1
–	April 17	Cubs	Postponed (rain); Makeup: June 6 as a traditional double-header					
6	April 18	Cubs	4–8	Bill Hands (1–0)	**Chris Short** (1–1)	None	3,172	4–2
–	April 19	Pirates	Postponed (cold weather); Makeup: June 15 as a traditional double-header					
7	April 21	@ Mets	3–6	Jack Fisher (1–1)	**Jim Bunning** (1–2)	Don Shaw (3)	5,093	4–3
8	April 22	@ Mets	4–3	**Larry Jackson** (2–0)	Bob Shaw (0–2)	None	15,032	5–3
9	April 23 (1)	@ Mets	10–6	**Grant Jackson** (1–0)	Don Shaw (0–1)	None	see 2nd game	6–3
10	April 23 (2)	@ Mets	3–1	**Dick Ellsworth** (1–0)	Bill Denehy (0–2)	None	38,081	7–3
11	April 25	@ Pirates	3–7	Billy O'Dell (1–0)	**Jim Bunning** (1–3)	None	5,585	7–4
–	April 26	@ Pirates	Postponed (rain); Makeup: August 31					
12	April 27	@ Pirates	4–5	Pete Mikkelsen (1–0)	**Dick Hall** (0–1)	Bill Short (1)	4,979	7–5
13	April 28	@ Braves	8–9	Clay Carroll (2–2)	**Dick Hall** (0–2)	None	12,921	7–6
14	April 29	@ Braves	2–3	Pat Jarvis (2–0)	**Chris Short** (1–2)	Phil Niekro (3)	12,200	7–7
15	April 30 (1)	@ Braves	6–4	**Grant Jackson** (2–0)	Clay Carroll (2–3)	**Dick Hall** (1)	see 2nd game	8–7
16	April 30 (2)	@ Braves	3–6	Bob Bruce (1–0)	**Rick Wise** (1–1)	Phil Niekro (4)	27,644	8–8

May (10–15)

#	Date	Opponent	Score	Win	Loss	Save	Attendance	Record
17	May 2	Astros	3–10	Mike Cuellar (2–1)	**Larry Jackson** (2–1)	None	4,568	8–9
18	May 3	Astros	1–0	**Chris Short** (2–2)	Larry Dierker (2–2)	None	4,428	9–9
19	May 4	Astros	1–4	Turk Farrell (1–0)	**Dick Ellsworth** (1–1)	Carroll Sembera (1)	3,591	9–10
20	May 5	Dodgers	3–1	**Jim Bunning** (2–3)	Jim Brewer (0–1)	**Chris Short** (1)	12,805	10–10
–	May 6	Dodgers	Postponed (rain); Makeup: July 18 as a traditional double-header					
–	May 7	Dodgers	Postponed (rain); Makeup: September 15 as a traditional double-header					
–	May 8	Braves	Postponed (rain); Makeup: May 10 as a traditional double-header					
21	May 9	Braves	3–2	**Chris Short** (3–2)	Clay Carroll (2–4)	**Dick Hall** (2)	3,770	11–10
22	May 10 (1)	Braves	4–3	**Turk Farrell** (2–0)	Phil Niekro (0–1)	None	see 2nd game	12–10
23	May 10 (2)	Braves	2–7	Wade Blasingame (1–0)	**Larry Jackson** (2–2)	Phil Niekro (6)	9,252	12–11
24	May 12	@ Reds	2–4	Sammy Ellis (3–2)	**Dick Ellsworth** (1–2)	None	10,460	12–12
25	May 13	@ Reds	3–2	**Turk Farrell** (3–0)	Billy McCool (3–2)	None	16,076	13–12
26	May 14 (1)	@ Reds	1–2	Jim Maloney (2–2)	**Larry Jackson** (2–3)	Ted Abernathy (11)	see 2nd game	13–13
27	May 14 (2)	@ Reds	0–1	Gary Nolan (3–1)	**Jim Bunning** (2–4)	None	12,381	13–14
28	May 16	@ Cardinals	3–4	Joe Hoerner (1–1)	**Grant Jackson** (2–1)	None	10,514	13–15
29	May 17	@ Cardinals	2–3	Dick Hughes (1–1)	**Turk Farrell** (3–1)	None	15,923	13–16
30	May 18	Reds	7–1^{^{[a]}}	**Jim Bunning** (3–4)	Billy McCool (3–3)	None	8,045	14–16
31	May 19	Reds	1–6	Jim Maloney (3–2)	**Larry Jackson** (2–4)	None	12,204	14–17
32	May 20	Reds	2–5	Gerry Arrigo (4–0)	**Grant Jackson** (2–2)	None	6,299	14–18
33	May 21	Reds	2–1 (18)	**Dick Hall** (1–2)	Darrell Osteen (0–1)	None	8,641	15–18
34	May 22	Giants	1–3	Gaylord Perry (2–4)	**Jim Bunning** (3–5)	None	9,341	15–19
35	May 23	Giants	4–5 (11)	Frank Linzy (3–1)	**Turk Farrell** (3–2)	Bill Henry (2)	9,920	15–20
–	May 24	Giants	Postponed (rain); Makeup: June 30 as a traditional double-header					
36	May 26	Cardinals	7–4	**Dick Hall** (2–2)	Ron Willis (1–1)	**Turk Farrell** (1)	15,365	16–20
37	May 27	Cardinals	4–11	Larry Jaster (3–1)	**Grant Jackson** (2–3)	Nelson Briles (1)	6,351	16–21
38	May 28	Cardinals	3–8	Steve Carlton (3–1)	**Larry Jackson** (2–5)	None	11,250	16–22
39	May 29	@ Giants	9–12	Joe Gibbon (1–0)	**Dick Ellsworth** (1–3)	Lindy McDaniel (1)	6,875	16–23
40	May 30	@ Giants	5–4	**Jim Bunning** (4–5)	Juan Marichal (8–4)	None	26,981	17–23
41	May 31	@ Dodgers	6–0 (11)	**Dick Hall** (3–2)	Don Drysdale (5–4)	None	16,044	18–23

June (17–14)

#	Date	Opponent	Score	Win	Loss	Save	Attendance	Record
42	June 1	@ Dodgers	6–1	**Larry Jackson** (3–5)	Claude Osteen (6–5)	None	16,597	19–23
43	June 2	@ Astros	5–3	**Dick Ellsworth** (2–3)	Chris Zachary (0–6)	**Turk Farrell** (2)	12,794	20–23
44	June 3	@ Astros	4–2	**Jim Bunning** (5–5)	Larry Dierker (5–3)	None	20,930	21–23
45	June 4	@ Astros	6–1	**Turk Farrell** (4–2)	Dan Schneider (0–1)	**Dick Hall** (3)	25,836	22–23
46	June 5	Cubs	3–13	Bob Hendley (2–0)	**Larry Jackson** (3–6)	Cal Koonce (2)	5,865	22–24
47	June 6 (1)	Cubs	8–6	**Dick Hall** (4–2)	Chuck Hartenstein (0–1)	None	see 2nd game	23–24
48	June 6 (2)	Cubs	9–8	**Turk Farrell** (5–2)	Ray Culp (3–5)	None	14,576	24–24
49	June 7	Cubs	1–3	Ferguson Jenkins (7–3)	**Jim Bunning** (5–6)	None	8,137	24–25
50	June 9	@ Pirates	1–16	Billy O'Dell (5–2)	**Rick Wise** (1–2)	None	17,064	24–26
51	June 10	@ Pirates	3–4	Al McBean (2–0)	**Dick Hall** (4–3)	None	17,587	24–27
52	June 11	@ Pirates	14–1	**Jim Bunning** (6–6)	Juan Pizarro (3–6)	None	15,915	25–27
53	June 12	Braves	7–4	**Turk Farrell** (6–2)	Dick Kelley (1–6)	None	9,874	26–27
54	June 13	Braves	0–1	Phil Niekro (2–2)	**Rick Wise** (1–3)	None	10,722	26–28
55	June 14	Braves	7–16	Ken Johnson (6–4)	**Larry Jackson** (3–7)	Bob Bruce (1)	10,143	26–29
56	June 15 (1)	Pirates	4–1	**Dick Hall** (5–3)	Bob Veale (7–2)	None	see 2nd game	27–29
57	June 15 (2)	Pirates	2–5	Steve Blass (2–1)	**Dick Ellsworth** (2–4)	None	24,480	27–30
58	June 16	Pirates	5–3	**Larry Jackson** (4–7)	Billy O'Dell (5–4)	None	20,796	28–30
59	June 17	Pirates	5–6	Dennis Ribant (3–3)	**Jim Bunning** (6–7)	Roy Face (10)	9,595	28–31
60	June 18	Pirates	3–5	Tommie Sisk (5–4)	**Rick Wise** (1–4)	Juan Pizarro (1)	14,726	28–32
61	June 20	Mets	4–0	**Larry Jackson** (5–7)	Bob Hendley (2–1)	None	7,718	29–32
62	June 21	Mets	0–2	Jack Fisher (5–7)	**Jim Bunning** (6–8)	None	8,229	29–33
–	June 22	Mets	Postponed (rain); Makeup: August 15 as a traditional double-header					
63	June 23	@ Cardinals	2–3	Dick Hughes (7–2)	**Rick Wise** (1–5)	None	31,727	29–34
64	June 24	@ Cardinals	1–2	Bob Gibson (9–5)	**Larry Jackson** (5–8)	None	19,486	29–35
65	June 25 (1)	@ Cardinals	6–4	**Jim Bunning** (7–8)	Larry Jaster (4–3)	**Dick Hall** (4)	see 2nd game	30–35
66	June 25 (2)	@ Cardinals	10–4	**John Boozer** (1–0)	Al Jackson (5–3)	None	47,020	31–35
67	June 26	@ Cubs	2–4	Rich Nye (6–3)	**Turk Farrell** (6–3)	Chuck Hartenstein (1)	9,145	31–36
68	June 27	@ Cubs	4–2	**Rick Wise** (2–5)	Curt Simmons (3–6)	**Dick Hall** (5)	12,769	32–36
69	June 28	@ Mets	6–5	**John Boozer** (2–0)	Tom Seaver (6–5)	**Dick Hall** (6)	20,396	33–36
70	June 29	@ Mets	1–0	**Jim Bunning** (8–8)	Jack Fisher (5–9)	None	13,653	34–36
71	June 30 (1)	Giants	10–3	**Chris Short** (4–2)	Gaylord Perry (5–10)	None	see 2nd game	35–36
72	June 30 (2)	Giants	3–12	Juan Marichal (11–6)	**Turk Farrell** (6–4)	None	22,618	35–37

July (13–14)

#	Date	Opponent	Score	Win	Loss	Save	Attendance	Record
73	July 1	Giants	2–3	Mike McCormick (9–3)	**Rick Wise** (2–6)	Frank Linzy (10)	20,181	35–38
74	July 2	Giants	8–7	**Dick Hall** (6–3)	Lindy McDaniel (1–4)	None	11,667	36–38
75	July 4 (1)	Astros	9–0	**Chris Short** (5–2)	Dave Giusti (4–8)	None	see 2nd game	37–38
76	July 4 (2)	Astros	4–3 (11)	**Larry Jackson** (6–8)	Barry Latman (1–4)	None	16,368	38–38
77	July 5	Astros	3–2	**Rick Wise** (3–6)	Mike Cuellar (9–4)	**Dick Hall** (7)	7,547	39–38
78	July 7	Cardinals	1–5	Steve Carlton (7–5)	**Larry Jackson** (6–9)	None	21,176	39–39
79	July 8	Cardinals	4–6 (12)	Nelson Briles (4–2)	**Dick Hall** (6–4)	Al Jackson (1)	21,488	39–40
80	July 9	Cardinals	4–3 (10)	**Rick Wise** (4–6)	Ron Willis (1–3)	None	19,619	40–40
–	July 11	**1967 Major League Baseball All-Star Game at Anaheim Stadium in Anaheim**						
–	July 13	@ Braves	Postponed (rain); Makeup: September 4 as a day-night double-header					
81	July 14	@ Braves	2–4	Tony Cloninger (3–4)	**Rick Wise** (4–7)	Cecil Upshaw (1)	21,168	40–41
82	July 15	@ Braves	2–5	Pat Jarvis (9–3)	**Chris Short** (5–3)	None	21,118	40–42
83	July 16	@ Reds	8–0	**Jim Bunning** (9–8)	Gerry Arrigo (5–4)	None	15,512	41–42
84	July 17	@ Reds	5–8	Ted Abernathy (3–3)	**Dick Hall** (6–5)	None	7,517	41–43
85	July 18 (1)	Dodgers	5–0	**Rick Wise** (5–7)	Don Sutton (6–11)	None	see 2nd game	42–43
86	July 18 (2)	Dodgers	1–2	Phil Regan (3–4)	**John Boozer** (2–1)	Ron Perranoski (8)	17,746	42–44
87	July 19	Dodgers	1–3 (11)	Jim Brewer (3–2)	**Chris Short** (5–4)	Ron Perranoski (9)	12,337	42–45
88	July 20	Dodgers	10–4	**Larry Jackson** (7–9)	Claude Osteen (11–10)	None	11,311	43–45
89	July 21	Reds	5–3	**Turk Farrell** (7–4)	Sammy Ellis (6–7)	**Dick Hall** (8)	15,899	44–45
90	July 22	Reds	7–2	**Rick Wise** (6–7)	Jim Maloney (8–6)	None	16,733	45–45
91	July 23	Reds	1–2	Milt Pappas (9–7)	**Chris Short** (5–5)	Ted Abernathy (15)	13,063	45–46
92	July 24	@ Astros	1–2 (11)	Mike Cuellar (10–6)	**Dick Hall** (6–6)	None	20,275	45–47
93	July 25	@ Astros	12–7	**Jim Bunning** (10–8)	Wade Blasingame (3–3)	**John Boozer** (1)	15,294	46–47
94	July 26	@ Astros	2–3	Larry Sherry (1–1)	**Rick Wise** (6–8)	None	10,741	46–48
95	July 27	@ Giants	8–3	**John Boozer** (3–1)	Mike McCormick (13–5)	None	9,786	47–48
96	July 28	@ Giants	2–7	Juan Marichal (13–9)	**Larry Jackson** (7–10)	None	16,155	47–49
97	July 29	@ Giants	1–6	Gaylord Perry (7–12)	**Jim Bunning** (10–9)	None	16,839	47–50
98	July 30	@ Dodgers	0–1	Don Sutton (7–12)	**Chris Short** (5–6)	None	20,806	47–51
99	July 31	@ Dodgers	4–2 (11)	**Dick Hall** (7–6)	Ron Perranoski (3–5)	**Turk Farrell** (3)	18,442	48–51

August (20–11)

#	Date	Opponent	Score	Win	Loss	Save	Attendance	Record
100	August 1	@ Dodgers	2–1	**Larry Jackson** (8–10)	Claude Osteen (12–11)	None	20,893	49–51
101	August 2	@ Dodgers	3–2 (10)	**Jim Bunning** (11–9)	Phil Regan (4–5)	**Turk Farrell** (4)	19,512	50–51
102	August 4	Astros	7–1	**Dick Ellsworth** (3–4)	Don Wilson (8–6)	None	7,349	51–51
103	August 5	Astros	10–3	**John Boozer** (4–1)	Wade Blasingame (4–4)	**Grant Jackson** (1)	4,695	52–51
104	August 6	Astros	8–4	**Dick Hall** (8–6)	Don Wilson (8–7)	None	25,845	53–51
105	August 7	Giants	8–0	**Jim Bunning** (12–9)	Gaylord Perry (8–13)	None	15,383	54–51
106	August 8	Giants	5–4 (10)	**Turk Farrell** (8–4)	Frank Linzy (5–6)	None	15,896	55–51
–	August 9	Giants	Postponed (rain); Makeup: September 30 as a traditional double-header in San Francisco					
107	August 10	@ Cubs	2–3	Chuck Hartenstein (6–2)	**Dick Hall** (8–7)	Bill Stoneman (1)	9,557	55–52
108	August 11	@ Cubs	2–1	**Jim Bunning** (13–9)	Jim Ellis (0–1)	None	8,766	56–52
109	August 12	@ Cubs	9–0	**Dick Ellsworth** (4–4)	Joe Niekro (6–6)	None	16,719	57–52
110	August 13 (1)	@ Cubs	2–6	Ken Holtzman (6–0)	**John Boozer** (4–2)	Bill Stoneman (2)	see 2nd game	57–53
111	August 13 (2)	@ Cubs	0–1	Ferguson Jenkins (16–9)	**Rick Wise** (6–9)	None	32,750	57–54
112	August 14	Mets	3–8	Jack Fisher (8–13)	**Larry Jackson** (8–11)	None	7,311	57–55
113	August 15 (1)	Mets	3–2 (12)	**Turk Farrell** (9–4)	Hal Reniff (3–5)	None	see 2nd game	58–55
114	August 15 (2)	Mets	7–5	**John Boozer** (5–2)	Don Cardwell (3–9)	**Turk Farrell** (5)	13,932	59–55
115	August 16	Mets	3–5	Cal Koonce (4–2)	**Dick Ellsworth** (4–5)	Dick Selma (1)	7,541	59–56
116	August 17	Cubs	5–2 (12)	**Dick Hall** (9–7)	Bill Hands (5–6)	None	15,786	60–56
117	August 18	Cubs	1–3	Jim Ellis (1–1)	**Larry Jackson** (8–12)	Chuck Hartenstein (9)	16,485	60–57
118	August 19	Cubs	1–6	Rich Nye (10–9)	**Jim Bunning** (13–10)	None	7,228	60–58
119	August 20	Cubs	1–6	Ken Holtzman (7–0)	**Chris Short** (5–7)	Bill Stoneman (3)	7,854	60–59
120	August 22 (1)	@ Mets	2–0	**Rick Wise** (7–9)	Tom Seaver (12–10)	None	see 2nd game	61–59
121	August 22 (2)	@ Mets	11–4	**Larry Jackson** (9–12)	Jack Fisher (8–15)	**Turk Farrell** (6)	30,951	62–59
122	August 23	@ Mets	3–2	**Dick Ellsworth** (5–5)	Cal Koonce (4–3)	**Dick Hall** (9)	18,456	63–59
–	August 24	Pirates	Postponed (rain); Makeup: August 25 as a traditional double-header					
123	August 25 (1)	Pirates	2–0	**Jim Bunning** (14–10)	Tommie Sisk (10–11)	None	see 2nd game	64–59
124	August 25 (2)	Pirates	6–2	**Chris Short** (6–7)	Steve Blass (4–6)	**Turk Farrell** (7)	13,696	65–59
125	August 26	Pirates	1–0	**Rick Wise** (8–9)	Bob Veale (14–7)	None	16,454	66–59
126	August 27	Pirates	2–0 (5)	**Larry Jackson** (10–12)	Woodie Fryman (2–7)	None	10,953	67–59
127	August 28	@ Reds	3–2	**Dick Ellsworth** (6–5)	Gerry Arrigo (6–6)	**Turk Farrell** (8)	9,524	68–59
128	August 29	@ Reds	0–1	Gary Nolan (11–6)	**Jim Bunning** (14–11)	Ted Abernathy (22)	8,667	68–60
129	August 30	@ Reds	1–2	Milt Pappas (14–9)	**Chris Short** (6–8)	Ted Abernathy (23)	6,453	68–61
130	August 31	@ Pirates	4–6	Bob Veale (15–7)	**Dick Hall** (9–8)	Juan Pizarro (5)	3,406	68–62

September (14–17)

#	Date	Opponent	Score	Win	Loss	Save	Attendance	Record
131	September 1	@ Pirates	0–3	Woodie Fryman (3–7)	**Larry Jackson** (10–13)	None	6,113	68–63
132	September 2	@ Pirates	1–9	Al McBean (5–3)	**Jim Bunning** (14–12)	None	6,431	68–64
133	September 3	@ Pirates	7–2	**Chris Short** (7–8)	Tommie Sisk (10–12)	**Turk Farrell** (9)	7,164	69–64
134	September 4 (1)	@ Braves	2–8	Clay Carroll (6–10)	**Rick Wise** (8–10)	None	10,060	69–65
135	September 4 (2)	@ Braves	1–8	Tony Cloninger (4–6)	**Dick Ellsworth** (6–6)	Cecil Upshaw (7)	10,103	69–66
136	September 5	@ Braves	4–3 (11)	**Dick Hall** (10–8)	Ed Rakow (3–2)	None	4,153	70–66
137	September 6	Reds	9–0	**Jim Bunning** (15–12)	Jim Maloney (13–10)	None	7,822	71–66
138	September 7	Reds	1–3	Milt Pappas (15–10)	**Chris Short** (7–9)	Ted Abernathy (25)	7,276	71–67
139	September 8	Braves	4–1	**Rick Wise** (9–10)	Clay Carroll (6–11)	None	11,220	72–67
140	September 9	Braves	4–3	**Larry Jackson** (11–13)	Tony Cloninger (4–7)	**Turk Farrell** (10)	9,607	73–67
141	September 10	Braves	10–5	**Jim Bunning** (16–12)	Ken Johnson (13–8)	**Turk Farrell** (11)	5,642	74–67
142	September 11	@ Cardinals	1–5	Nelson Briles (12–5)	**Chris Short** (7–10)	None	18,390	74–68
143	September 12	@ Cardinals	0–6	Bob Gibson (12–6)	**Rick Wise** (9–11)	Larry Jaster (3)	19,932	74–69
144	September 13	@ Cardinals	3–0	**Larry Jackson** (12–13)	Dick Hughes (14–6)	None	18,683	75–69
145	September 15 (1)	Dodgers	0–1	Bill Singer (12–6)	**Jim Bunning** (16–13)	None	see 2nd game	75–70
146	September 15 (2)	Dodgers	0–1	Don Drysdale (11–15)	**Chris Short** (7–11)	None	12,018	75–71
147	September 16	Dodgers	8–4 (11)	**Turk Farrell** (10–4)	Ron Perranoski (6–7)	None	5,549	76–71
148	September 17	Dodgers	6–1	**Larry Jackson** (13–13)	Claude Osteen (16–16)	None	8,464	77–71
149	September 18	Cardinals	1–5	Bob Gibson (13–6)	**Dick Ellsworth** (6–7)	None	10,433	77–72
150	September 19	Cardinals	0–1	Dick Hughes (15–6)	**Jim Bunning** (16–14)	None	9,934	77–73
151	September 20	Cardinals	3–1	**Chris Short** (8–11)	Steve Carlton (14–9)	None	8,466	78–73
152	September 22	@ Dodgers	1–7	Don Sutton (11–15)	**Larry Jackson** (13–14)	None	14,006	78–74
153	September 23	@ Dodgers	4–0	**Jim Bunning** (17–14)	Claude Osteen (16–17)	None	14,943	79–74
154	September 24	@ Dodgers	3–1	**Rick Wise** (10–11)	John Duffie (0–2)	None	15,259	80–74
155	September 25	@ Astros	3–4	Howie Reed (1–1)	**Turk Farrell** (10–5)	None	6,771	80–75
156	September 26	@ Astros	2–3	Dave Eilers (6–4)	**John Boozer** (5–3)	None	7,256	80–76
157	September 27	@ Astros	0–1 (11)	Mike Cuellar (16–11)	**Jim Bunning** (17–15)	None	3,616	80–77
158	September 28	@ Giants	2–1	**Rick Wise** (11–11)	Gaylord Perry (15–17)	**Turk Farrell** (12)	3,471	81–77
159	September 29	@ Giants	9–1	**Chris Short** (9–11)	Ron Herbel (4–5)	None	6,997	82–77
160	September 30 (1)	@ Giants	2–3	Ray Sadecki (12–6)	**Larry Jackson** (13–15)	None	see 2nd game	82–78
161	September 30 (2)	@ Giants	0–1	Néstor Chávez (1–0)	**John Boozer** (5–4)	Lindy McDaniel (2)	11,667	82–79

October (0–1)

#	Date	Opponent	Score	Win	Loss	Save	Attendance	Record
162	October 1	@ Giants	1–2	Mike McCormick (22–10)	**Turk Farrell** (10–6)	None	33,615	82–80

^{^[a]}The May 18, 1967, game was protested by the Reds in the bottom of the sixth inning. The protest was later denied.

=== Roster ===
1967 Philadelphia Phillies
**Roster**
**Pitchers**: 28 John Boozer; 30 Bob Buhl; 14 Jim Bunning; 37 Dick Ellsworth; 32 Turk Farrell; 22 Rubén Gómez; 26 Dallas Green; 27 Dick Hall; 29 Grant Jackson; 46 Larry Jackson; 30 Larry Loughlin; 28 Pedro Ramos; 41 Chris Short; 26 Dick Thoenen; 31 Gary Wagner; 38 Rick Wise	**Catchers**: 11 Clay Dalrymple; 9 Gene Oliver; 21 Jimmie Schaffer; 9 Bob Uecker; **Infielders**: 15 Dick Allen; 19 Tito Francona; 24 Dick Groat; 18 Chuck Hiller; 20 Rick Joseph; 18 Phil Linz; 16 Cookie Rojas; 35 Gary Sutherland; 8 Tony Taylor; 10 Bill White; 7 Bobby Wine	**Outfielders**: 20 Jackie Brandt; 12 Johnny Briggs; 6 Johnny Callison; 17 Doug Clemens; 24 Billy Cowan; 25 Tony González; 23 Don Lock; **Other batters**: 34 Terry Harmon	**Manager**: 4 Gene Mauch; **Coaches**: 3 Don Hoak; 1 George Myatt; 2 Andy Seminick; 5 Larry Shepard

== Player stats ==
=== Batting ===
==== Starters by position ====
Note: Pos = Position; G = Games played; AB = At bats; H = Hits; Avg. = Batting average; HR = Home runs; RBI = Runs batted in

Pos	Player	G	AB	H	Avg.	HR	RBI
C	Clay Dalrymple	101	268	46	.172	3	21
1B	Bill White	110	308	77	.250	8	33
2B	Cookie Rojas	147	528	137	.259	4	45
SS	Bobby Wine	135	363	69	.190	2	28
3B	Dick Allen	122	463	142	.307	23	77
LF	Tony González	149	508	172	.339	9	59
CF	Don Lock	112	313	79	.252	14	51
RF	Johnny Callison	149	556	145	.261	14	64

==== Other batters ====
Note: G = Games played; AB = At bats; H = Hits; Avg. = Batting average; HR = Home runs; RBI = Runs batted in

Player	G	AB	H	Avg.	HR	RBI
Tony Taylor	132	462	110	.238	2	34
Johnny Briggs	106	332	77	.232	9	30
Gene Oliver	85	263	59	.224	7	34
Gary Sutherland	103	231	57	.247	1	19
Doug Clemens	69	73	13	.178	0	4
Tito Francona	27	73	15	.205	0	3
Billy Cowan	34	59	9	.153	3	6
Chuck Hiller	31	43	13	.302	0	2
Rick Joseph	17	41	9	.220	1	5
Bob Uecker	18	35	6	.171	0	7
Dick Groat	10	26	3	.115	0	1
Jackie Brandt	16	19	2	.105	0	1
Phil Linz	23	18	4	.222	1	5
Jimmie Schaffer	2	2	0	.000	0	0
Terry Harmon	2	0	0	----	0	0

=== Pitching ===
==== Starting pitchers ====
Note: G = Games pitched; IP = Innings pitched; W = Wins; L = Losses; ERA = Earned run average; SO = Strikeouts

Player	G	IP	W	L	ERA	SO
Jim Bunning	40	302.1	17	15	2.29	253
Larry Jackson	40	261.2	13	15	3.10	139
Chris Short	29	199.1	9	11	2.39	142
Rick Wise	36	181.1	11	11	3.28	111

==== Other pitchers ====
Note: G = Games pitched; IP = Innings pitched; W = Wins; L = Losses; ERA = Earned run average; SO = Strikeouts

Player	G	IP	W	L	ERA	SO
Dick Ellsworth	32	125.1	6	7	4.38	45
John Boozer	28	74.2	5	4	4.10	48

==== Relief pitchers ====
Note: G = Games pitched; W = Wins; L = Losses; SV = Saves; ERA = Earned run average; SO = Strikeouts

Player	G	W	L	SV	ERA	SO
Turk Farrell	50	9	6	12	2.05	68
Dick Hall	48	10	8	9	2.20	49
Grant Jackson	43	2	3	1	3.84	83
Dallas Green	8	0	0	0	9.00	12
Rubén Gómez	7	0	0	0	3.97	9
Pedro Ramos	6	0	0	0	9.00	1
Larry Loughlin	3	0	0	0	15.19	5
Bob Buhl	3	0	0	0	12.00	1
Gary Wagner	1	0	0	0	0.00	1
Cookie Rojas	1	0	0	0	0.00	0
Dick Thoenen	1	0	0	0	9.00	0

== Farm system ==
Level	Team	League	Manager
AAA	San Diego Padres	Pacific Coast League	Bob Skinner
AA	Reading Phillies	Eastern League	Frank Lucchesi
A	Bakersfield Bears	California League	Nolan Campbell
A	Tidewater Tides	Carolina League	Bob Wellman
A	Spartanburg Phillies	Western Carolinas League	Dick Teed
A-Short Season	Batavia Trojans	New York–Penn League	Max Lanier
A-Short Season	Huron Phillies	Northern League	Joe Lonnett
A-Short Season	Eugene Emeralds	Northwest League	Bobby Malkmus

LEAGUE CHAMPIONS: San Diego, Spartanburg
