= 1967 Chicago Cubs season =

1967 Chicago Cubs
- League: National League
- Ballpark: Wrigley Field
- City: Chicago
- Record: 87–74 (.540)
- League place: 3rd
- Owners: Philip K. Wrigley
- General managers: John Holland
- Managers: Leo Durocher
- Television: WGN-TV (Jack Brickhouse, Vince Lloyd)
- Radio: WGN (Vince Lloyd, Lou Boudreau)

The 1967 Chicago Cubs season was the 96th season of the Chicago Cubs franchise, the 92nd in the National League and the 52nd at Wrigley Field. The Cubs finished third in the National League with a record of 87–74, fourteen games behind the NL and World Series Champion St. Louis Cardinals.

== Offseason ==
- October 18, 1966: Joey Amalfitano was released by the Cubs.
- October 18, 1966: Marty Keough was released by the Cubs.
- November 29, 1966: Chris Krug and Wayne Schurr were traded by the Cubs to the California Angels for Mike White and Don Furnald (minors).
- November 29, 1966: Hal Haydel was drafted from the Cubs by the San Francisco Giants in the 1966 minor league draft.

== Regular season ==
=== Season standings ===
National League
Team	W	L	Pct.	GB	Home	Road
St. Louis Cardinals	101	60	.627	—	49‍–‍32	52‍–‍28
San Francisco Giants	91	71	.562	10½	51‍–‍31	40‍–‍40
Chicago Cubs	87	74	.540	14	49‍–‍34	38‍–‍40
Cincinnati Reds	87	75	.537	14½	49‍–‍32	38‍–‍43
Philadelphia Phillies	82	80	.506	19½	45‍–‍35	37‍–‍45
Pittsburgh Pirates	81	81	.500	20½	49‍–‍32	32‍–‍49
Atlanta Braves	77	85	.475	24½	48‍–‍33	29‍–‍52
Los Angeles Dodgers	73	89	.451	28½	42‍–‍39	31‍–‍50
Houston Astros	69	93	.426	32½	46‍–‍35	23‍–‍58
New York Mets	61	101	.377	40½	36‍–‍42	25‍–‍59

=== Record vs. opponents ===
1967 National League record Sources:
Team	ATL	CHC	CIN	HOU	LAD	NYM	PHI	PIT	SF	STL
Atlanta	—	11–7	5–13	11–7	8–10	8–10	10–8	8–10	10–8	6–12
Chicago	7–11	—	12–6	8–10	9–9	13–5	11–7	11–7–1	10–8	6–11
Cincinnati	13–5	6–12	—	15–3	8–10	12–6	10–8	10–8	8–10	5–13
Houston	7–11	10–8	3–15	—	10–8	11–7	7–11	9–9	6–12	6–12
Los Angeles	10–8	9–9	10–8	8–10	—	12–6	6–12	7–11	5–13	6–12
New York	10–8	5–13	6–12	7–11	6–12	—	4–14	11–7	5–13	7–11
Philadelphia	8-10	7–11	8–10	11–7	12–6	14–4	—	8–10	8–10	6–12
Pittsburgh	10–8	7–11–1	8–10	9–9	11–7	7–11	10–8	—	8–10	11–7
San Francisco	8–10	8–10	10–8	12–6	13–5	13–5	10–8	10–8	—	7–11
St. Louis	12–6	11–6	13–5	12–6	12–6	11–7	12–6	7–11	11–7	—

=== Notable transactions ===
- May 20, 1967: Joey Amalfitano was signed as a free agent by the Cubs.
- July 6, 1967: Joey Amalfitano was released by the Cubs.
- July 24, 1967: Bob Shaw was purchased by the Cubs from the New York Mets.
- September 19, 1967: Bob Shaw was released by the Cubs.

== Roster ==
1967 Chicago Cubs
Roster
Pitchers: 45 Dick Calmus; 37 Ray Culp; 34 Jim Ellis; 41 Rob Gardner; 49 Bill Hands; 42 Chuck Hartenstein; 33 Bob Hendley; 30 Ken Holtzman; 38 Rick James; 31 Ferguson Jenkins; 34 Cal Koonce; 33 Don Larsen; 40 Pete Mikkelsen; 48 Joe Niekro; 41 Fred Norman; 32 Rich Nye; 43 Dick Radatz; 33 Bob Shaw; 39 Curt Simmons; 36 Bill Stoneman; 45 John Upham	Catchers: 6 Dick Bertell; 9 Randy Hundley; 6 John Stephenson; Infielders: 14 Ernie Banks; 18 Glenn Beckert; 15 Norm Gigon; 11 Don Kessinger; 22 Paul Popovich; 10 Ron Santo	Outfielders: 21,29 George Altman; 12 John Boccabella; 29 Byron Browne; 25 Joe Campbell; 27 Clarence Jones; 20 Adolfo Phillips; 24,27 Bob Raudman; 25 Ted Savage; 21 Al Spangler; 8 Lee Thomas; 26 Billy Williams; Other batters: 5 Joey Amalfitano; 25 Jimmy Stewart	Manager: 2 Leo Durocher; Coaches: 5 Joey Amalfitano; 3 Joe Becker; 7 Pete Reiser; 4 Verlon Walker

== Player stats ==
=== Batting ===
==== Starters by position ====
Note: Pos = Position; G = Games played; AB = At bats; H = Hits; Avg. = Batting average; HR = Home runs; RBI = Runs batted in

Pos	Player	G	AB	H	Avg.	HR	RBI
C	Randy Hundley	152	539	144	.267	14	60
1B	Ernie Banks	151	573	158	.276	23	95
2B	Glenn Beckert	146	597	167	.280	5	40
SS	Don Kessinger	145	580	134	.231	0	42
3B	Ron Santo	161	586	176	.300	31	98
LF	Billy Williams	162	634	176	.278	28	84
CF	Adolfo Phillips	144	448	120	.268	17	70
RF	Ted Savage	96	225	49	.218	5	33

==== Other batters ====
Note: G = Games played; AB = At bats; H = Hits; Avg. = Batting average; HR = Home runs; RBI = Runs batted in

Player	G	AB	H	Avg.	HR	RBI
Lee Thomas	77	191	42	.220	2	23
Paul Popovich	49	159	34	.214	0	2
Clarence Jones	53	135	34	.252	2	16
Al Spangler	62	130	33	.254	0	13
Norm Gigon	34	70	12	.171	1	6
John Stephenson	18	49	11	.224	0	5
John Boccabella	25	35	6	.171	0	8
Bob Raudman	8	26	4	.154	0	1
Byron Browne	10	19	3	.158	0	2
George Altman	15	18	2	.111	0	1
Dick Bertell	2	6	1	.167	0	0
Jimmy Stewart	6	6	1	.167	0	1
Joe Campbell	1	3	0	.000	0	0
Joey Amalfitano	4	1	0	.000	0	0

=== Pitching ===
==== Starting pitchers ====
Note: G = Games pitched; IP = Innings pitched; W = Wins; L = Losses; ERA = Earned run average; SO = Strikeouts

Player	G	IP	W	L	ERA	SO
Ferguson Jenkins	38	289.1	20	13	2.80	236
Rich Nye	35	205.0	13	10	3.20	119
Ray Culp	30	152.2	8	11	3.89	111
Ken Holtzman	12	92.2	9	0	2.53	62
Curt Simmons	17	82.0	3	7	4.94	31
Dick Calmus	1	4.1	0	0	8.31	1

==== Other pitchers ====
Note: G = Games pitched; IP = Innings pitched; W = Wins; L = Losses; ERA = Earned run average; SO = Strikeouts

Player	G	IP	W	L	ERA	SO
Joe Niekro	36	169.2	10	7	3.34	77
Bill Hands	49	150.0	7	8	2.46	84
Rob Gardner	18	31.2	0	2	3.98	16
Bob Shaw	9	22.1	0	2	6.04	7
Jim Ellis	8	16.2	1	1	3.24	8
Rick James	3	4.2	0	1	13.50	2

==== Relief pitchers ====
Note: G = Games pitched; W = Wins; L = Losses; SV = Saves; ERA = Earned run average; SO = Strikeouts

Player	G	W	L	SV	ERA	SO
Chuck Hartenstein	45	9	5	11	3.08	20
Cal Koonce	34	2	2	2	4.59	28
Bill Stoneman	28	2	4	4	3.29	52
Dick Radatz	20	1	0	5	6.56	18
Bob Hendley	7	2	0	1	6.57	10
Pete Mikkelsen	7	0	0	0	6.43	0
John Upham	5	0	1	0	33.75	2
Don Larsen	3	0	0	0	9.00	1
Fred Norman	1	0	0	0	0.00	3

== Farm system ==
Level	Team	League	Manager
AAA	Tacoma Cubs	Pacific Coast League	Whitey Lockman
AA	Dallas-Fort Worth Spurs	Texas League	Jo-Jo White
A	Lodi Crushers	California League	Walt Dixon
A	Quincy Cubs	Midwest League	Harry Bright
A	Duluth–Superior Dukes	Northern League	Ira Hutchinson
Rookie	Caldwell Cubs	Pioneer League	George Freese

Duluth-Superior affiliation shared with Chicago White Sox
