= 1967 St. Louis Cardinals season =

Major League Baseball season

1967 St. Louis Cardinals
- World Series champions National League champions
- League: National League
- Ballpark: Busch Memorial Stadium
- City: St. Louis, Missouri
- Record: 101–60 (.627)
- League place: 1st
- Owners: August "Gussie" Busch
- General managers: Stan Musial
- Managers: Red Schoendienst
- Television: KSD-TV
- Radio: KMOX (Harry Caray, Jack Buck, Jerry Gross)

The 1967 St. Louis Cardinals season was the team's 86th season in St. Louis, Missouri, its 76th season in the National League, and its first full season at Busch Memorial Stadium. Gussie Busch hired former outfielder Stan Musial as general manager of the Cardinals before the season. Featuring four future Hall of Famers in Lou Brock, Bob Gibson, Steve Carlton, and Orlando Cepeda, "El Birdos" went 101–60 during the season and won the NL pennant by 10 1/2 games over the San Francisco Giants. They went on to win the World Series in seven games over the Boston Red Sox.

== Offseason ==
- December 8, 1966: Charley Smith was traded by the Cardinals to the New York Yankees for Roger Maris.
- December 14, 1966: Walt Williams and Don Dennis were traded by the Cardinals to the Chicago White Sox for Johnny Romano and Lee White (minors).

== Regular season ==
First baseman Orlando Cepeda won the MVP Award this year, batting .325, with 25 home runs and 111 RBIs. He was the first unanimous selection (all 20 first-place votes for 280 points) for the award in the history of the National League. Catcher Tim McCarver was second in the MVP voting for 136 points. Pitcher Bob Gibson and outfielder Curt Flood won Gold Gloves this year.

Flood, whose record streak of 568 consecutive chances in the field without an error ended June 4 when he dropped a fly ball, returned to regular play in late July. His 227-game string had begun September 3, 1965. Once back in the lineup, he batted .373 the rest of the season, finishing fourth in the league at .335.

=== Season standings ===
National League
Team	W	L	Pct.	GB	Home	Road
St. Louis Cardinals	101	60	.627	—	49‍–‍32	52‍–‍28
San Francisco Giants	91	71	.562	10½	51‍–‍31	40‍–‍40
Chicago Cubs	87	74	.540	14	49‍–‍34	38‍–‍40
Cincinnati Reds	87	75	.537	14½	49‍–‍32	38‍–‍43
Philadelphia Phillies	82	80	.506	19½	45‍–‍35	37‍–‍45
Pittsburgh Pirates	81	81	.500	20½	49‍–‍32	32‍–‍49
Atlanta Braves	77	85	.475	24½	48‍–‍33	29‍–‍52
Los Angeles Dodgers	73	89	.451	28½	42‍–‍39	31‍–‍50
Houston Astros	69	93	.426	32½	46‍–‍35	23‍–‍58
New York Mets	61	101	.377	40½	36‍–‍42	25‍–‍59

=== Record vs. opponents ===
1967 National League record Sources:
Team	ATL	CHC	CIN	HOU	LAD	NYM	PHI	PIT	SF	STL
Atlanta	—	11–7	5–13	11–7	8–10	8–10	10–8	8–10	10–8	6–12
Chicago	7–11	—	12–6	8–10	9–9	13–5	11–7	11–7–1	10–8	6–11
Cincinnati	13–5	6–12	—	15–3	8–10	12–6	10–8	10–8	8–10	5–13
Houston	7–11	10–8	3–15	—	10–8	11–7	7–11	9–9	6–12	6–12
Los Angeles	10–8	9–9	10–8	8–10	—	12–6	6–12	7–11	5–13	6–12
New York	10–8	5–13	6–12	7–11	6–12	—	4–14	11–7	5–13	7–11
Philadelphia	8-10	7–11	8–10	11–7	12–6	14–4	—	8–10	8–10	6–12
Pittsburgh	10–8	7–11–1	8–10	9–9	11–7	7–11	10–8	—	8–10	11–7
San Francisco	8–10	8–10	10–8	12–6	13–5	13–5	10–8	10–8	—	7–11
St. Louis	12–6	11–6	13–5	12–6	12–6	11–7	12–6	7–11	11–7	—

=== Notable transactions ===
- April 1, 1967: Art Mahaffey, Jerry Buchek and Tony Martínez were traded by the Cardinals to the New York Mets for Ed Bressoud, Danny Napoleon, and cash.
- June 6, 1967: Ted Simmons was drafted by the Cardinals in the 1st round (10th pick) of the 1967 Major League Baseball draft.

=== Roster ===
1967 St. Louis Cardinals roster
Roster
Pitchers: 34 Nelson Briles; 32 Steve Carlton; 42 Jim Cosman; 45 Bob Gibson; 43 Joe Hoerner; 31 Dick Hughes; 38 Al Jackson; 39 Larry Jaster; 23 Jack Lamabe; 48 Mike Torrez; 44 Ray Washburn; 36 Ron Willis; 46 Hal Woodeshick	Catchers: 15 Tim McCarver; 10 Dave Ricketts; 1 Johnny Romano; Infielders: 11 Ed Bressoud; 30 Orlando Cepeda; 16 Phil Gagliano; 14 Steve Huntz; 25 Julián Javier; 27 Dal Maxvill; 18 Mike Shannon; 26 Ed Spiezio; 24 Jimy Williams	Outfielders: 20 Lou Brock; 21 Curt Flood; 12 Alex Johnson; 9 Roger Maris; 17 Bobby Tolan; Other batters: 22 Ted Savage	Manager: 2 Red Schoendienst; Coaches: 8 Bob Milliken; 4 Billy Muffett; 3 Joe Schultz; 5 Dick Sisler

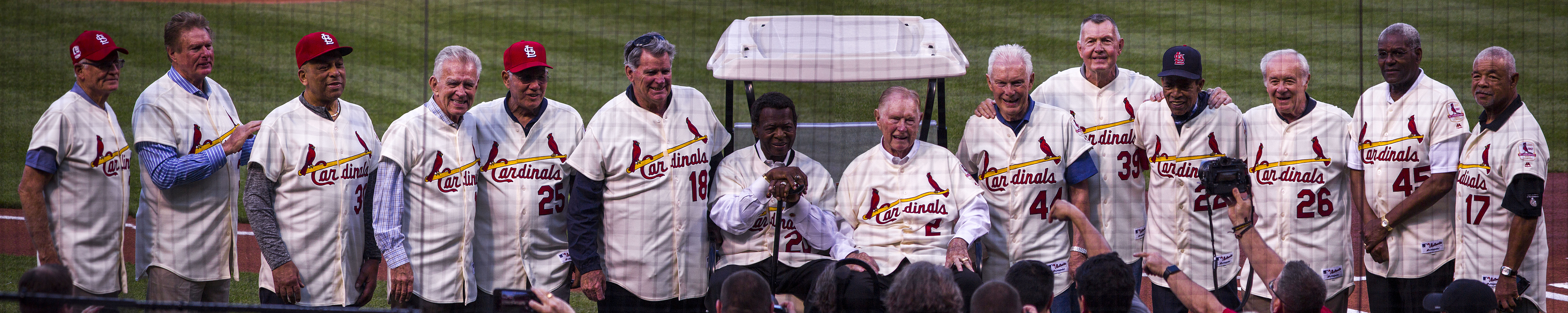
May 17, 2017. Players reunite 50 years after their Championship Season.(Pictured from left to right) Dick Hughes, Steve Carlton, Orlando Cepeda, Tim McCarver, Julian Javier, Mike Shannon, Lou Brock, Red Schoendienst, Ray Washburn, Larry Jaster, Ted Savage, Ed Spiezio, Bob Gibson, Bobby Tolan.

== Player stats ==
= Indicates team leader

= Indicates league leader

=== Batting ===
==== Starters by position ====
Note: Pos = Position; G = Games played; AB = At bats; H = Hits; Avg. = Batting average; HR = Home runs; RBI = Runs batted in

Pos	Player	G	AB	H	Avg.	HR	RBI
C	Tim McCarver	138	471	139	.295	14	69
1B	Orlando Cepeda	151	563	183	.325	25	111
2B	Julián Javier	140	520	146	.281	14	64
3B	Mike Shannon	130	482	118	.245	12	77
SS	Dal Maxvill	152	476	108	.227	1	41
LF	Lou Brock	159	689	206	.299	21	76
CF	Curt Flood	134	514	172	.335	5	50
RF	Roger Maris	125	410	107	.261	9	55

==== Other batters ====
Note: G = Games played; AB = At bats; H = Hits; Avg. = Batting average; HR = Home runs; RBI = Runs batted in

Player	G	AB	H	Avg.	HR	RBI
Bobby Tolan	110	265	67	.253	6	32
Phil Gagliano	73	217	48	.221	2	21
Alex Johnson	81	175	39	.223	1	12
Ed Spiezio	55	105	22	.210	3	10
Dave Ricketts	52	99	27	.273	1	14
Ed Bressoud	52	67	9	.134	1	1
Johnny Romano	24	58	7	.121	0	2
Ted Savage	9	8	1	.125	0	0
Steve Huntz	3	6	1	.167	0	0
Jimy Williams	1	2	0	.000	0	0

=== Pitching ===
==== Starting pitchers ====
Note: G = Games pitched; IP = Innings pitched; W = Wins; L = Losses; ERA = Earned run average; SO = Strikeouts

Player	G	IP	W	L	ERA	SO
Dick Hughes	37	222.1	16	6	2.67	161
Steve Carlton	30	193.0	14	9	2.98	168
Ray Washburn	27	186.1	10	7	3.53	98
Bob Gibson	24	175.1	13	7	2.98	147
Larry Jaster	34	152.1	9	7	3.01	87

==== Other pitchers ====
Note: G = Games pitched; IP = Innings pitched; W = Wins; L = Losses; ERA = Earned run average; SO = Strikeouts

Player	G	IP	W	L	ERA	SO
Nelson Briles	49	155.1	14	5	2.43	94
Al Jackson	38	107.0	9	4	3.95	43
Jim Cosman	10	31.1	1	0	3.16	11
Mike Torrez	3	5.2	0	1	3.18	5

==== Relief pitchers ====
Note: G = Games pitched; W = Wins; L = Losses; SV = Saves; ERA = Earned run average; SO = Strikeouts

Player	G	W	L	SV	ERA	SO
Joe Hoerner	57	4	4	15	2.59	50
Ron Willis	65	6	5	10	2.67	42
Hal Woodeshick	36	2	1	2	5.18	20
Jack Lamabe	23	3	4	4	2.83	30

== 1967 World Series ==
St. Louis defeated the Boston Red Sox in the World Series, bursting "The Impossible Dream" bubble of the latter team, which had won their first pennant in 21 years on the last day of the season. Bob Gibson won Games 1, 4 and 7 in the Series and was named Series MVP for a second time. Nelson Briles won Game 3. Gibson came back from a broken leg during the season to accomplish his incredible World Series performance. KMOX radio awarded Lou Brock a car for his superb play (12–29 .414 with a record-tying 7 stolen bases) in the Series.

NL St. Louis Cardinals (4) vs. AL Boston Red Sox (3)
Game	Score	Date	Location	Attendance	Time of Game
1	Cardinals – 2, Red Sox – 1	October 4	Fenway Park	34,796	2:22
2	Cardinals – 0, Red Sox – 5	October 5	Fenway Park	35,188	2:24
3	Red Sox – 2, Cardinals – 5	October 7	Busch Memorial Stadium	54,575	2:15
4	Red Sox – 0, Cardinals – 6	October 8	Busch Memorial Stadium	54,575	2:05
5	Red Sox – 3, Cardinals – 1	October 9	Busch Memorial Stadium	54,575	2:20
6	Cardinals – 4, Red Sox – 8	October 11	Fenway Park	35,188	2:48
7	Cardinals – 7, Red Sox – 2	October 12	Fenway Park	35,188	2:23

Despite winning a World Series in his first season as general manager, Musial stepped down, citing that he did not think the occupation was right for him, making it his only season as GM. He worked in other capacities in the Cardinals front office until 1980. Busch rehired Bing Devine after Musial's resignation.

== Awards and honors ==
- Lou Brock, Babe Ruth Award
- Orlando Cepeda, National League Most Valuable Player Award
- Bob Gibson, World Series Most Valuable Player Award
- Red Schoendienst, Associated Press NL Manager of the Year

== Farm system ==
Level	Team	League	Manager
AAA	Tulsa Oilers	Pacific Coast League	Warren Spahn
AA	Arkansas Travelers	Texas League	Vern Rapp
A	Modesto Reds	California League	Sparky Anderson
A	St. Petersburg Cardinals	Florida State League	Ron Plaza
A	Cedar Rapids Cardinals	Midwest League	Jack Krol
A-Short Season	Lewiston Broncos	Northwest League	Ray Hathaway
Rookie	GCL Cardinals	Gulf Coast League	George Kissell

LEAGUE CHAMPIONS: St. Petersburg
