= 1967 New York Mets season =

1967 New York Mets
- League: National League
- Ballpark: Shea Stadium
- City: New York
- Record: 61–101 (.377)
- League place: 10th
- Owners: Joan Whitney Payson
- General manager: Bing Devine
- Managers: Wes Westrum, Salty Parker
- Television: WOR-TV
- Radio: WJRZ (Ralph Kiner, Lindsey Nelson, Bob Murphy)

The 1967 New York Mets season was the sixth regular season for the Mets. They went 61–101 and finished tenth in the National League, 40 1/2 games behind the NL pennant and World Series Champion St. Louis Cardinals. They were managed by Wes Westrum and Salty Parker. They played home games at Shea Stadium. One of the only bright spots was rookie pitcher Tom Seaver (whom the Mets won the right to draft in a lottery) who posted a 2.76 ERA, a 16–13 record and was voted to his first All-Star Game. Seaver's arrival would help turn the Mets around from lovable losers to legitimate contenders.

== Offseason ==
- October 12, 1966: Lou Klimchock and Ernie Bowman were traded by the Mets to the Cleveland Indians for Floyd Weaver.
- November 29, 1966: Amos Otis was drafted by the Mets from the Boston Red Sox in the 1966 minor league draft.
- November 29, 1966: Ron Hunt and Jim Hickman were traded by the Mets to the Los Angeles Dodgers for Tommy Davis and Derrell Griffith.
- November 30, 1966: Ralph Terry was released by the Mets.
- December 6, 1966: Dennis Ribant and Gary Kolb were traded by the Mets to the Pittsburgh Pirates for Don Cardwell and Don Bosch.
- March 24, 1967: Derrell Griffith was traded by the Mets to the Houston Astros for Sandy Alomar Sr.

== Regular season ==
Although the Mets took a step back from the previous year, 1967 marked the debut of pitcher Tom Seaver. On July 19, at Shea Stadium, he recorded 10 strikeouts (The first of 62 games he would achieve that feat as a Mets uniform) in a 7–2 win over the Atlanta Braves. For the season he recorded 16 wins and 170 strikeouts, a Mets record. He had 18 complete games and a 2.76 ERA, also a Mets record. It all adds up to Seaver being named The National League Rookie of the Year, and a berth in the All-Star Game.

=== Season standings ===
National League
Team	W	L	Pct.	GB	Home	Road
St. Louis Cardinals	101	60	.627	—	49‍–‍32	52‍–‍28
San Francisco Giants	91	71	.562	10½	51‍–‍31	40‍–‍40
Chicago Cubs	87	74	.540	14	49‍–‍34	38‍–‍40
Cincinnati Reds	87	75	.537	14½	49‍–‍32	38‍–‍43
Philadelphia Phillies	82	80	.506	19½	45‍–‍35	37‍–‍45
Pittsburgh Pirates	81	81	.500	20½	49‍–‍32	32‍–‍49
Atlanta Braves	77	85	.475	24½	48‍–‍33	29‍–‍52
Los Angeles Dodgers	73	89	.451	28½	42‍–‍39	31‍–‍50
Houston Astros	69	93	.426	32½	46‍–‍35	23‍–‍58
New York Mets	61	101	.377	40½	36‍–‍42	25‍–‍59

=== Record vs. opponents ===
1967 National League record Sources:
Team	ATL	CHC	CIN	HOU	LAD	NYM	PHI	PIT	SF	STL
Atlanta	—	11–7	5–13	11–7	8–10	8–10	10–8	8–10	10–8	6–12
Chicago	7–11	—	12–6	8–10	9–9	13–5	11–7	11–7–1	10–8	6–11
Cincinnati	13–5	6–12	—	15–3	8–10	12–6	10–8	10–8	8–10	5–13
Houston	7–11	10–8	3–15	—	10–8	11–7	7–11	9–9	6–12	6–12
Los Angeles	10–8	9–9	10–8	8–10	—	12–6	6–12	7–11	5–13	6–12
New York	10–8	5–13	6–12	7–11	6–12	—	4–14	11–7	5–13	7–11
Philadelphia	8-10	7–11	8–10	11–7	12–6	14–4	—	8–10	8–10	6–12
Pittsburgh	10–8	7–11–1	8–10	9–9	11–7	7–11	10–8	—	8–10	11–7
San Francisco	8–10	8–10	10–8	12–6	13–5	13–5	10–8	10–8	—	7–11
St. Louis	12–6	11–6	13–5	12–6	12–6	11–7	12–6	7–11	11–7	—

=== Notable transactions ===
- April 1, 1967: Eddie Bressoud, Danny Napoleon, and cash were traded by the Mets to the St. Louis Cardinals for Art Mahaffey, Jerry Buchek and Tony Martínez.
- April 2, 1967: Ralph Terry was signed as a free agent by the Mets.
- May 16, 1967: Ralph Terry was released by the Mets.
- June 6, 1967: Rich Hacker was drafted by the Mets in the 8th round of the 1967 Major League Baseball draft (secondary phase).
- June 21, 1967: Al Luplow was acquired by the Pittsburgh Pirates from the New York Mets via waivers.
- July 22, 1967: Ken Boyer and a player to be named later were traded by the Mets to the Chicago White Sox for Bill Southworth and a player to be named later. The Mets completed their part of the deal by sending Sandy Alomar to the White Sox on August 15. The White Sox completed the deal by sending J. C. Martin to the Mets on November 27.
- July 24, 1967: Bob Shaw was purchased from the Mets by the Chicago Cubs.

=== Roster ===
1967 New York Mets
Roster
Pitchers: 38 Dennis Bennett; 27 Don Cardwell; 22,38 Bill Connors; 44 Bill Denehy; 32,33 Chuck Estrada; 22 Jack Fisher; 29 Danny Frisella; 26 Bill Graham; 43 Joe Grzenda; 32 Jack Hamilton; 33 Bob Hendley; 40 Jerry Hinsley; 34 Cal Koonce; 36 Jerry Koosman; 34 Jack Lamabe; 45 Tug McGraw; 32 Hal Reniff; 31 Les Rohr; 44 Al Schmelz; 41 Tom Seaver; 39 Dick Selma; 26 Bob Shaw; 35 Don Shaw; 42 Ron Taylor; 38 Ralph Terry; 29 Nick Willhite; 35 Billy Wynne	Catchers: 10 Greg Goossen; 15 Jerry Grote; 20 John Sullivan; 19 Hawk Taylor; Infielders: 5 Sandy Alomar Sr.; 12,24 Ken Boswell; 14 Ken Boyer; 1 Jerry Buchek; 5,24 Ed Charles; 40 Kevin Collins; 3 Bud Harrelson; 11 Bob Heise; 2 Chuck Hiller; 6,25 Bob Johnson; 7 Ed Kranepool; 2 Phil Linz; 18 Joe Moock; 6 Bart Shirley	Outfielders: 17 Don Bosch; 12 Tommy Davis; 21 Cleon Jones; 24 Johnny Lewis; 18 Al Luplow; 28 Amos Otis; 16 Tommie Reynolds; 25 Larry Stahl; 4 Ron Swoboda	Manager: 54 Salty Parker; 9 Wes Westrum; Coaches: 8 Yogi Berra; 52 Harvey Haddix; 54 Salty Parker; 53 Sheriff Robinson

== Player stats ==
=== Batting ===
==== Starters by position ====
Note: Pos = Position; G = Games played; AB = At bats; H = Hits; Avg. = Batting average; HR = Home runs; RBI = Runs batted in

Pos	Player	G	AB	H	Avg.	HR	RBI
C	Jerry Grote	120	344	67	.195	4	23
1B	Ed Kranepool	141	469	126	.269	10	54
2B	Jerry Buchek	124	411	97	.236	14	41
SS	Bud Harrelson	151	540	137	.254	1	28
3B	Ed Charles	101	323	77	.238	3	31
LF	Tommy Davis	154	577	174	.302	16	73
CF	Cleon Jones	129	411	101	.246	5	30
RF	Ron Swoboda	134	449	126	.281	13	53

==== Other batters ====
Note: G = Games played; AB = At bats; H = Hits; Avg. = Batting average; HR = Home runs; RBI = Runs batted in

Player	G	AB	H	Avg.	HR	RBI
Bob Johnson	90	230	80	.348	5	27
Ken Boyer	56	166	39	.235	3	13
Larry Stahl	71	155	37	.239	1	18
John Sullivan	65	147	32	.218	0	6
Tommie Reynolds	101	136	28	.206	2	9
Al Luplow	41	112	23	.205	3	9
Don Bosch	44	93	13	.140	0	2
Greg Goossen	37	69	11	.159	0	3
Bob Heise	16	62	20	.323	0	3
Amos Otis	19	59	13	.220	0	1
Phil Linz	24	58	12	.207	0	1
Chuck Hiller	25	54	5	.093	0	3
Ken Boswell	11	40	9	.225	1	4
Joe Moock	13	40	9	.225	0	5
Hawk Taylor	13	37	9	.243	0	4
Johnny Lewis	13	34	4	.118	0	2
Sandy Alomar	15	22	0	.000	0	0
Bart Shirley	6	12	0	.000	0	0
Kevin Collins	4	10	1	.100	0	0

=== Pitching ===
==== Starting pitchers ====
Note: G = Games pitched; IP = Innings pitched; W = Wins; L = Losses; ERA = Earned run average; SO = Strikeouts

Player	G	IP	W	L	ERA	SO
Tom Seaver	35	251.0	16	13	2.76	170
Jack Fisher	39	220.1	9	18	4.70	117
Danny Frisella	14	74.0	1	6	3.41	51
Bob Hendley	15	70.2	3	3	3.44	36
Tug McGraw	4	17.1	0	3	7.79	18
Les Rohr	3	17.0	2	1	2.12	15

==== Other pitchers ====
Note: G = Games pitched; IP = Innings pitched; W = Wins; L = Losses; ERA = Earned run average; SO = Strikeouts

Player	G	IP	W	L	ERA	SO
Don Cardwell	26	118.1	5	9	3.57	71
Bob Shaw	23	98.2	3	9	4.29	49
Bill Denehy	15	53.2	1	7	4.70	35
Cal Koonce	11	45.0	3	3	2.80	24
Bill Graham	5	27.1	1	2	2.63	14
Dennis Bennett	8	26.1	1	1	5.13	14
Jerry Koosman	9	22.1	0	2	6.04	11
Chuck Estrada	9	22.0	1	2	9.41	15
Bill Connors	6	13.0	0	0	6.23	13
Billy Wynne	6	8.2	0	0	3.12	4
Nick Willhite	4	8.1	0	1	8.64	9

==== Relief pitchers ====
Note: G = Games pitched; W = Wins; L = Losses; SV = Saves; ERA = Earned run average; SO = Strikeouts

Player	G	W	L	SV	ERA	SO
Ron Taylor	50	4	6	8	2.34	46
Don Shaw	40	4	5	3	2.98	44
Dick Selma	38	2	4	2	2.77	52
Hal Reniff	29	3	3	4	3.35	21
Jack Hamilton	17	2	0	1	3.73	22
Jack Lamabe	16	0	3	1	3.98	23
Joe Grzenda	11	0	0	0	2.16	9
Jerry Hinsley	2	0	0	0	3.60	3
Ralph Terry	2	0	0	0	0.00	5
Al Schmelz	2	0	0	0	3.00	2

== Farm system ==
Level	Team	League	Manager
AAA	Jacksonville Suns	International League	Bill Virdon
AA	Williamsport Mets	Eastern League	Roy Sievers
A	Durham Bulls	Carolina League	Clyde McCullough
A	Winter Haven Mets	Florida State League	Pete Pavlick
A-Short Season	Mankato Mets	Northern League	Buddy Peterson
Rookie	Marion Mets	Appalachian League	Birdie Tebbetts

LEAGUE CHAMPIONS: Durham
