= 1967 Pittsburgh Pirates season =

1967 Pittsburgh Pirates
- League: National League
- Ballpark: Forbes Field
- City: Pittsburgh, Pennsylvania
- Owners: John W. Galbreath (majority shareholder); Bing Crosby, Thomas P. Johnson (minority shareholders)
- General managers: Joe L. Brown
- Managers: Harry Walker, Danny Murtaugh
- Television: KDKA-TV; Bob Prince, Jim Woods, Nellie King
- Radio: KDKA; Bob Prince, Jim Woods, Nellie King

The 1967 Pittsburgh Pirates season was the 86th season in franchise history. The sixth-place Pirates finished at 81–81, 20 1/2 games behind the National League and World Series champion St. Louis Cardinals.

== Offseason ==
- October 12, 1966: Wilbur Wood was traded by the Pirates to the Chicago White Sox for player to be named. November 28, 1966: Juan Pizarro sent to the Pirates to complete trade.
- October 142, 1966: Jerry Lynch was released by the Pirates.
- October 17, 1966: Bill Short was sold to the Pirates by the Boston Red Sox.
- November 29, 1966: Manny Jiménez was drafted by the Pirates from the Kansas City Athletics in the 1966 minor league draft.
- December 1, 1966: Bob Bailey and Gene Michael were traded by the Pirates to the Los Angeles Dodgers for Maury Wills.
- December 6, 1966: Don Cardwell and Don Bosch were traded by the Pirates to the New York Mets for Dennis Ribant and Gary Kolb.

== Regular season ==
=== Season standings ===
National League
Team	W	L	Pct.	GB	Home	Road
St. Louis Cardinals	101	60	.627	—	49‍–‍32	52‍–‍28
San Francisco Giants	91	71	.562	10½	51‍–‍31	40‍–‍40
Chicago Cubs	87	74	.540	14	49‍–‍34	38‍–‍40
Cincinnati Reds	87	75	.537	14½	49‍–‍32	38‍–‍43
Philadelphia Phillies	82	80	.506	19½	45‍–‍35	37‍–‍45
Pittsburgh Pirates	81	81	.500	20½	49‍–‍32	32‍–‍49
Atlanta Braves	77	85	.475	24½	48‍–‍33	29‍–‍52
Los Angeles Dodgers	73	89	.451	28½	42‍–‍39	31‍–‍50
Houston Astros	69	93	.426	32½	46‍–‍35	23‍–‍58
New York Mets	61	101	.377	40½	36‍–‍42	25‍–‍59

=== Record vs. opponents ===
1967 National League record Sources:
Team	ATL	CHC	CIN	HOU	LAD	NYM	PHI	PIT	SF	STL
Atlanta	—	11–7	5–13	11–7	8–10	8–10	10–8	8–10	10–8	6–12
Chicago	7–11	—	12–6	8–10	9–9	13–5	11–7	11–7–1	10–8	6–11
Cincinnati	13–5	6–12	—	15–3	8–10	12–6	10–8	10–8	8–10	5–13
Houston	7–11	10–8	3–15	—	10–8	11–7	7–11	9–9	6–12	6–12
Los Angeles	10–8	9–9	10–8	8–10	—	12–6	6–12	7–11	5–13	6–12
New York	10–8	5–13	6–12	7–11	6–12	—	4–14	11–7	5–13	7–11
Philadelphia	8-10	7–11	8–10	11–7	12–6	14–4	—	8–10	8–10	6–12
Pittsburgh	10–8	7–11–1	8–10	9–9	11–7	7–11	10–8	—	8–10	11–7
San Francisco	8–10	8–10	10–8	12–6	13–5	13–5	10–8	10–8	—	7–11
St. Louis	12–6	11–6	13–5	12–6	12–6	11–7	12–6	7–11	11–7	—

=== Game log ===
1967 Game Log: 81–81 (Home: 49–32; Away: 32–49)
April: 7–5 (Home: 3–3; Away: 4–2)

#	Date	Opponent	Score	Win	Loss	Save	Attendance	Record
1	April 11	@ Mets	6–3	**Veale** (1–0)	Cardwell	**Mikkelsen** (1)	31,510	1–0
2	April 13	@ Mets	2–3	Estrada	**Law** (0–1)	Taylor	5,005	1–1
3	April 14	Cubs	5–8	Simmons	**Ribant** (0–1)	—	32,296	1–2
4	April 15	Cubs	3–7	Culp	**Sisk** (0–1)	—	10,624	1–3
5	April 16	Cubs	6–5	**Pizarro** (1–0)	Upham	—	13,510	2–3
6	April 17	Mets	6–9	Cardwell	**Law** (0–2)	Taylor	7,599	2–4
7	April 21	@ Cubs	6–1	**Veale** (2–0)	Culp	—	2,974	3–4
8	April 23	@ Cubs	3–7	Jenkins	**Pizarro** (1–1)	—	6,754	3–5
9	April 25	Phillies	7–3	**O'Dell** (1–0)	Bunning	—	5,585	4–5
10	April 27	Phillies	5–4	**Mikkelsen** (1–0)	Hall	**Short** (1)	4,979	5–5
11	April 28	@ Cardinals	6–2	**Veale** (3–0)	Washburn	—	45,565	6–5
12	April 30	@ Cardinals	2–0	**Pizarro** (2–1)	Jaster	—	20,017	7–5

May: 16–13 (Home: 11–6; Away: 5–7)

#	Date	Opponent	Score	Win	Loss	Save	Attendance	Record
13	May 1	@ Cardinals	8–5	**O'Dell** (2–0)	Jackson	**Face** (1)	13,707	8–5
14	May 2	Dodgers	3–5 (11)	Regan	**Blass** (0–1)	Perranoski	5,762	8–6
15	May 3	Dodgers	6–5 (15)	**Pizarro** (3–1)	Singer	—	9,124	9–6
16	May 4	Dodgers	9–3	**Veale** (4–0)	Egan	**Mikkelsen** (2)	9,603	10–6
17	May 5	Giants	7–2	**Sisk** (1–1)	Bolin	—	18,294	11–6
18	May 6	Giants	6–5 (10)	**Face** (1–0)	Linzy	—	7,662	12–6
19	May 8	Cardinals	5–6 (10)	Willis	**Law** (0–3)	Jaster	5,388	12–7
20	May 9	Cardinals	3–6	Carlton	**Fryman** (0–1)	Hoerner	4,951	12–8
21	May 10	Cardinals	4–1	**Veale** (5–0)	Hughes	**Face** (2)	8,466	13–8
22	May 11	Braves	2–9	Bruce	**Sisk** (1–2)	—	4,885	13–9
23	May 12	Braves	5–2	**O'Dell** (3–0)	Jarvis	**Face** (3)	12,920	14–9
24	May 13	Braves	6–5 (10)	**Face** (2–0)	Niekro	—	8,156	15–9
25	May 14	Braves	5–2	**Ribant** (1–1)	Kelley	**Face** (4)	26,071	16–9
26	May 15	@ Reds	7–8 (10)	Arrigo	**Pizarro** (3–2)	—	5,222	16–10
27	May 16	@ Reds	3–6	Queen	**Fryman** (0–2)	—	13,389	16–11
28	May 17	@ Reds	1–3	Ellis	**Sisk** (1–3)	—	13,159	16–12
29	May 18	@ Braves	5–3	**O'Dell** (4–0)	Carroll	**Face** (5)	14,092	17–12
30	May 19	@ Braves	2–3	Lemaster	**Ribant** (1–2)	—	20,603	17–13
31	May 20	@ Braves	6–2	**Veale** (6–0)	Kelley	**McBean** (1)	33,883	18–13
32	May 21	@ Braves	2–7	Johnson	**Pizarro** (3–3)	—	23,221	18–14
33	May 22	@ Astros	3–1	**Sisk** (2–3)	Zachary	—	10,613	19–14
34	May 23	@ Astros	3–8	Dierker	**O'Dell** (4–1)	Schneider	10,572	19–15
35	May 24	@ Astros	7–4	**Face** (3–0)	Latman	—	13,140	20–15
36	May 26	Reds	6–5 (12)	**McBean** (1–0)	Osteen	—	24,358	21–15
37	May 27	Reds	1–6	Pappas	**Pizarro** (3–4)	—	28,179	21–16
38	May 28	Reds	3–2	**Sisk** (3–3)	Nottebart	**Face** (6)	31,778	22–16
39	May 30	Astros	2–3	Wilson	**Ribant** (1–3)	—		22–17
40	May 30	Astros	4–3	**Face** (4–0)	Sembera	—	32,986	23–17
41	May 31	@ Giants	4–15	Herbel	**Veale** (6–1)	Linzy	7,393	23–18

June: 13–17 (Home: 6–7; Away: 7–10)

#	Date	Opponent	Score	Win	Loss	Save	Attendance	Record
42	June 1	@ Giants	1–7	Perry	**Pizarro** (3–5)	—	7,000	23–19
43	June 2	@ Dodgers	5–3	**Blass** (1–1)	Regan	**Face** (7)	35,540	24–19
44	June 3	@ Dodgers	1–5	Sutton	**O'Dell** (4–2)	—	39,621	24–20
45	June 4	@ Dodgers	4–1	**Veale** (7–1)	Drysdale	**Face** (8)	39,741	25–20
46	June 6	Mets	0–1 (10)	Shaw	**Face** (4–1)	—		25–21
47	June 6	Mets	2–3 (10)	Hamilton	**Face** (4–2)	—	16,712	25–22
48	June 7	Mets	3–0	**Sisk** (4–3)	Fisher	—	7,979	26–22
49	June 9	Phillies	16–1	**O'Dell** (5–2)	Wise	—	17,064	27–22
50	June 10	Phillies	4–3	**McBean** (2–0)	Hall	—	17,587	28–22
51	June 11	Phillies	1–14	Bunning	**Pizarro** (3–6)	—	15,915	28–23
52	June 12	Cardinals	7–5	**Ribant** (2–3)	Carlton	**Face** (9)	10,964	29–23
53	June 13	Cardinals	4–7	Hughes	**Sisk** (4–4)	Hoerner	14,325	29–24
54	June 14	Cardinals	4–7	Gibson	**O'Dell** (5–3)	—	14,217	29–25
55	June 15	@ Phillies	1–4	Hall	**Veale** (7–2)	—		29–26
56	June 15	@ Phillies	5–2	**Blass** (2–1)	Ellsworth	—	24,480	30–26
57	June 16	@ Phillies	3–5	Jackson	**O'Dell** (5–4)	—	20,796	30–27
58	June 17	@ Phillies	6–5	**Ribant** (3–3)	Bunning	**Face** (10)	9,595	31–27
59	June 18	@ Phillies	5–3	**Sisk** (5–4)	Wise	**Pizarro** (1)	14,726	32–27
60	June 19	Cubs	4–3	**Veale** (8–2)	Jenkins	**McBean** (2)	12,224	33–27
61	June 20	Cubs	3–5	Hartenstein	**Blass** (2–2)	—	12,393	33–28
62	June 21	Cubs	3–6	Simmons	**O'Dell** (5–5)	Radatz	11,870	33–29
63	June 23	@ Reds	4–2	**Ribant** (4–3)	Abernathy	**McBean** (3)	25,227	34–29
64	June 24	@ Reds	4–6	Nolan	**Sisk** (5–5)	Lee	28,312	34–30
65	June 25	@ Reds	5–4	**Veale** (9–2)	Pappas	**Pizarro** (2)	23,673	35–30
66	June 26	@ Mets	2–3	Taylor	**Face** (4–3)	—	27,294	35–31
67	June 27	@ Mets	2–5	Selma	**Fryman** (0–3)	—	18,167	35–32
68	June 28	@ Cubs	2–4	Jenkins	**Ribant** (4–4)	—		35–33
69	June 28	@ Cubs	1–3	Culp	**Sisk** (5–6)	—	22,731	35–34
70	June 29	@ Cubs	3–4	Niekro	**McBean** (2–1)	Hartenstein	16,415	35–35
71	June 30	Braves	3–1	**Blass** (3–2)	Carroll	—	15,988	36–35

July: 13–16 (Home: 9–6; Away: 4–10)

#	Date	Opponent	Score	Win	Loss	Save	Attendance	Record
72	July 1	Braves	2–4	Raymond	**Mikkelsen** (1–1)	—	9,353	36–36
73	July 3	Dodgers	5–2	**Sisk** (6–6)	Drysdale	—	12,321	37–36
74	July 4	Dodgers	9–7	**Face** (5–3)	Miller	—	9,080	38–36
75	July 5	Dodgers	3–5	Sutton	**Blass** (3–3)	—	12,821	38–37
76	July 7	Reds	2–6	Ellis	**Veale** (9–3)	—	19,805	38–38
77	July 8	Reds	6–1	**Sisk** (7–6)	Arrigo	—	11,182	39–38
78	July 9	Reds	2–1	**Ribant** (5–4)	Maloney	—	25,934	40–38
79	July 12	@ Cardinals	3–4	Jackson	**Mikkelsen** (1–2)	—	14,812	40–39
80	July 13	@ Cardinals	8–5	**Veale** (10–3)	Carlton	**McBean** (4)	24,134	41–39
81	July 14	@ Cardinals	1–2	Jaster	**Sisk** (7–7)	Hoerner	25,668	41–40
82	July 15	@ Cardinals	6–4	**Pizarro** (4–6)	Briles	**Face** (11)	39,440	42–40
83	July 16	@ Braves	1–2	Niekro	**Law** (0–4)	—	35,204	42–41
84	July 17	@ Braves	2–6	Johnson	**Veale** (10–4)	—	18,220	42–42
85	July 18	Giants	8–6	**Blass** (4–3)	Marichal	**Face** (12)		43–42
86	July 18	Giants	2–3	Gibbon	**O'Dell** (5–6)	Linzy	28,023	43–43
87	July 19	Giants	2–1 (11)	**Ribant** (6–4)	McCormick	—	16,013	44–43
88	July 20	Giants	1–6	Perry	**Law** (0–5)	—	10,359	44–44
89	July 21	Astros	9–1	**Veale** (11–4)	Blasingame	—	14,687	45–44
90	July 22	Astros	15–2	**Fryman** (1–3)	Belinsky	—	9,597	46–44
91	July 23	Astros	5–8	Giusti	**Blass** (4–4)	Sherry		46–45
92	July 23	Astros	15–2	**Sisk** (8–7)	Latman	—	22,925	47–45
93	July 24	@ Dodgers	3–4	Regan	**Face** (5–4)	—	22,495	47–46
94	July 25	@ Dodgers	1–3	Singer	**Law** (0–6)	—	24,348	47–47
95	July 26	@ Dodgers	4–2	**Veale** (12–4)	Sutton	**Pizarro** (3)	24,772	48–47
96	July 27	@ Astros	4–5	Latman	**McBean** (2–2)	—	17,229	48–48
97	July 28	@ Astros	3–9	Giusti	**Sisk** (8–8)	—	20,909	48–49
98	July 29	@ Astros	5–6	Eilers	**Pizarro** (4–7)	Sherry	25,785	48–50
99	July 30	@ Giants	4–3	**Law** (1–6)	Sadecki	**Face** (13)	32,209	49–50
100	July 31	@ Giants	4–8	McCormick	**Pizarro** (4–8)	Linzy	8,683	49–51

August: 15–18 (Home: 10–5; Away: 5–13)

#	Date	Opponent	Score	Win	Loss	Save	Attendance	Record
101	August 1	@ Giants	1–3	Marichal	**Fryman** (1–4)	—	15,501	49–52
102	August 2	@ Giants	2–7	Perry	**Ribant** (6–5)	—	11,654	49–53
103	August 4	Dodgers	3–2 (10)	**Pizarro** (5–8)	Miller	—	13,474	50–53
104	August 5	Dodgers	2–1	**Law** (2–6)	Regan	—	9,658	51–53
105	August 6	Dodgers	4–5	Osteen	**Sisk** (8–9)	Perranoski	12,384	51–54
106	August 7	@ Cubs	6–3	**Face** (6–4)	Hartenstein	—		52–54
107	August 7	@ Cubs	3–3 (14)			—	11,482	52–54
108	August 8	@ Cubs	4–8	Niekro	**Gelnar** (0–1)	—	9,412	52–55
109	August 9	@ Cubs	0–6	Jenkins	**Veale** (12–5)	—		52–56
110	August 9	@ Cubs	10–6	**McBean** (3–2)	Stoneman	—	16,822	53–56
111	August 10	@ Mets	3–0	**Sisk** (9–9)	Fisher	—	20,572	54–56
112	August 11	@ Mets	2–3	Frisella	**Ribant** (6–6)	Shaw	29,202	54–57
113	August 12	@ Mets	1–6	Koonce	**Fryman** (1–5)	—	20,181	54–58
114	August 13	@ Mets	0–3	Seaver	**Blass** (4–5)	—		54–59
115	August 13	@ Mets	9–11	Shaw	**McBean** (3–3)	Taylor	34,122	54–60
116	August 14	Reds	4–3	**Veale** (13–5)	Nolan	**Face** (14)	8,414	55–60
117	August 15	Reds	1–2	Abernathy	**Sisk** (9–10)	—	9,237	55–61
118	August 16	Reds	0–4	Maloney	**Fryman** (1–6)	McCool	9,116	55–62
119	August 17	Mets	5–6	Cardwell	**Pizarro** (5–9)	—		55–63
120	August 17	Mets	6–5 (14)	**Pizarro** (6–9)	Seaver	—	9,213	56–63
121	August 18	Mets	7–2	**Veale** (14–5)	Fisher	—	6,628	57–63
122	August 19	Mets	6–5	**Sisk** (10–10)	Taylor	—	7,570	58–63
123	August 20	Mets	4–2	**Pizarro** (7–9)	Selma	**Face** (15)	7,263	59–63
124	August 21	Cubs	5–1	**Fryman** (2–6)	Jenkins	**Face** (16)	7,794	60–63
125	August 22	Cubs	1–8	Niekro	**Veale** (14–6)	—	8,414	60–64
126	August 23	Cubs	2–1	**McBean** (4–3)	Hands	—	8,952	61–64
127	August 25	@ Phillies	0–2	Bunning	**Sisk** (10–11)	—		61–65
128	August 25	@ Phillies	2–6	Short	**Blass** (4–6)	Farrell	13,696	61–66
129	August 26	@ Phillies	0–1	Wise	**Veale** (14–7)	—	16,454	61–67
130	August 27	@ Phillies	0–2 (5)	Jackson	**Fryman** (2–7)	—	10,953	61–68
131	August 28	@ Braves	4–3 (10)	**Ribant** (7–6)	Ritchie	**Pizarro** (4)	8,725	62–68
132	August 29	@ Braves	3–7	Niekro	**Ribant** (7–7)	Upshaw	6,516	62–69
133	August 30	@ Braves	11–9	**Ribant** (8–7)	Carroll	**Face** (17)	8,674	63–69
134	August 31	Phillies	6–4	**Veale** (15–7)	Hall	**Pizarro** (5)	3,406	64–69

September: 16–12 (Home: 9–5; Away: 7–7)

#	Date	Opponent	Score	Win	Loss	Save	Attendance	Record
135	September 1	Phillies	3–0	**Fryman** (3–7)	Jackson	—	6,113	65–69
136	September 2	Phillies	9–1	**McBean** (5–3)	Bunning	—	6,431	66–69
137	September 3	Phillies	2–7	Short	**Sisk** (10–12)	Farrell	7,164	66–70
138	September 4	@ Cardinals	10–8	**Ribant** (9–7)	Lamabe	**Pizarro** (6)		67–70
139	September 4	@ Cardinals	9–3	**Blass** (5–6)	Washburn	**Pizarro** (7)	43,960	68–70
140	September 6	Braves	1–4	Lemaster	**Fryman** (3–8)	—		68–71
141	September 6	Braves	4–1	**McBean** (6–3)	Jarvis	—	6,849	69–71
142	September 7	Braves	4–2	**Sisk** (11–12)	Niekro	**Pizarro** (8)	3,990	70–71
143	September 8	Cardinals	4–3 (10)	**Dal Canton** (1–0)	Willis	—	9,637	71–71
144	September 9	Cardinals	0–6	Carlton	**Blass** (5–7)	—	6,446	71–72
145	September 10	Cardinals	8–7	**Pizarro** (8–9)	Hoerner	**Sisk** (1)	8,920	72–72
146	September 11	@ Reds	3–4	Davidson	**Pizarro** (8–10)	—	4,150	72–73
147	September 12	@ Reds	7–15	Lee	**Veale** (15–8)	Nottebart	4,605	72–74
148	September 13	@ Reds	11–3	**Sisk** (12–12)	Queen	—	4,966	73–74
149	September 15	Giants	3–6	Perry	**Blass** (5–8)	—	6,332	73–75
150	September 16	Giants	5–4 (16)	**Dal Canton** (2–0)	McCormick	—	5,056	74–75
151	September 17	Giants	5–4	**McBean** (7–3)	Linzy	—	5,733	75–75
152	September 18	@ Astros	4–14	Giusti	**Sisk** (12–13)	—	6,327	75–76
153	September 19	@ Astros	11–7	**Face** (7–4)	Sherry	**Pizarro** (9)	5,321	76–76
154	September 20	@ Astros	4–5	House	**Ribant** (9–8)	—	4,629	76–77
155	September 22	@ Giants	0–1	Sadecki	**McBean** (7–4)	—	10,238	76–78
156	September 23	@ Giants	4–8	McDaniel	**Face** (7–5)	Linzy	12,431	76–79
157	September 24	@ Giants	2–1	**Blass** (6–8)	Perry	**Fryman** (1)	16,123	77–79
158	September 25	@ Dodgers	2–1 (11)	**Shellenback** (1–0)	Regan	—	11,983	78–79
159	September 26	@ Dodgers	1–3	Drysdale	**Dal Canton** (2–1)	Perranoski	12,486	78–80
160	September 27	@ Dodgers	1–0	**Veale** (16–8)	Foster	—	12,467	79–80
161	September 29	Astros	4–1	**Moose** (1–0)	Blasingame	—	1,951	80–80
162	September 30	Astros	3–4	Coombs	**Shellenback** (1–1)	—	2,109	80–81

October: 1–0 (Home: 1–0; Away: 0–0)

#	Date	Opponent	Score	Win	Loss	Save	Attendance	Record
163	October 1	Astros	10–3	**Sisk** (13–13)	Von Hoff	—	28,244	81–81

Legend: = Win = Loss = Tie
Bold = Pirates team member

=== Opening Day lineup ===
Opening Day Starters
#	Name	Position
18	Matty Alou	CF
30	Maury Wills	3B
21	Roberto Clemente	RF
8	Willie Stargell	LF
17	Donn Clendenon	1B
9	Bill Mazeroski	2B
14	Gene Alley	SS
20	Jesse Gonder	C
39	Bob Veale	SP

=== Notable transactions ===
- June 6, 1967: Richie Zisk was drafted by the Pirates in the 3rd round of the 1967 Major League Baseball draft.
- June 21, 1967: Al Luplow was acquired by the Pirates from the New York Mets via waivers.
- July 18, 1967: Pirates fire Manager Harry Walker. Danny Murtaugh is named interim Manager.
- August 4, 1967: Pete Mikkelsen claimed on waivers by Chicago Cubs from the Pirates.

=== Roster ===
1967 Pittsburgh Pirates
**Roster**
**Pitchers**: 28 Steve Blass; 19 Bruce Dal Canton; 26 Roy Face; 22 Woodie Fryman; 37 John Gelnar; 32 Vern Law; 34 Al McBean; 19 Pete Mikkelsen; 38 Bob Moose; 31 Billy O'Dell; 29 Juan Pizarro; 36 Dennis Ribant; 38 Jim Shellenback; 37 Bill Short; 25 Tommie Sisk; 39 Bob Veale	**Catchers**: 20 Jesse Gonder; 12 Jerry May; 10 Jim Pagliaroni; 35 Manny Sanguillén; **Infielders**: 14 Gene Alley; 17 Donn Clendenon; 9 Bill Mazeroski; 11 José Pagán; 3,24 Bob Robertson; 7 Andre Rodgers; 30 Maury Wills	**Outfielders**: 18 Matty Alou; 21 Roberto Clemente; 24 Manny Jiménez; 20 Al Luplow; 15 Manny Mota; 23 George Spriggs; 8 Willie Stargell	**Manager**: 40 Danny Murtaugh; 3 Harry Walker; **Coaches**: 5 Alex Grammas (Third base); 6 Clyde King (Pitching); 4 Johnny Pesky (First base); 2 Hal Smith (Bullpen)

== Statistics ==
Batting

Note: G = Games played; AB = At bats; H = Hits; Avg. = Batting average; HR = Home runs; RBI = Runs batted in

Regular Season
Player	G	AB	H	Avg.	HR	RBI
Roberto Clemente	147	585	209	0.357	23	110
Matty Alou	139	550	186	0.338	2	28
Bruce Dal Canton	8	6	2	0.333	0	1
Bob Moose	2	6	2	0.333	0	1
Manny Mota	120	349	112	0.321	4	56
Maury Wills	149	616	186	0.302	3	45
Jose Pagan	81	211	61	0.289	1	19
Gene Alley	152	550	158	0.287	6	55
Manny Sanguillen	30	96	26	0.271	0	8
Jerry May	110	325	88	0.271	3	22
Willie Stargell	134	462	125	0.271	20	73
Dennis Ribant	47	60	16	0.267	0	3
Bill Mazeroski	163	639	167	0.261	9	77
Juan Pizarro	50	27	7	0.259	0	3
Manny Jimenez	50	56	14	0.250	2	10
Donn Clendenon	131	478	119	0.249	13	56
Andre Rodgers	47	61	14	0.230	2	4
Al McBean	51	29	6	0.207	0	3
Jim Pagliaroni	44	100	20	0.200	0	9
Al Luplow	55	103	19	0.184	1	8
George Spriggs	38	57	10	0.175	0	5
Bob Robertson	9	35	6	0.171	2	4
John Gelnar	10	6	1	0.167	0	0
Jim Shellenback	6	6	1	0.167	0	0
Jesse Gonder	22	36	5	0.139	0	3
Steve Blass	32	39	5	0.128	0	5
Woodie Fryman	28	34	4	0.118	0	1
Billy O'Dell	28	26	3	0.115	0	0
Vern Law	26	27	3	0.111	0	1
Tommie Sisk	37	69	7	0.101	0	4
Bob Veale	33	69	3	0.043	0	1
Roy Face	61	6	0	0.000	0	0
Pete Mikkelsen	32	4	0	0.000	0	0
Bill Short	6	1	0	0.000	0	0
Team totals	163	5,724	1,585	0.277	91	615

Pitching

Note: G = Games pitched; IP = Innings pitched; W = Wins; L = Losses; ERA = Earned run average; SO = Strikeouts

Regular Season
Player	G	IP	W	L	ERA	SO
Bruce Dal Canton	8	24	2	1	1.88	13
Roy Face	61	74 1/3	7	5	2.42	41
Al McBean	51	131	7	4	2.54	54
Jim Shellenback	6	23 1/3	1	1	2.70	11
Tommie Sisk	37	207 2/3	13	13	3.34	85
Steve Blass	32	126 2/3	6	8	3.55	72
Bob Veale	33	203	16	8	3.64	179
Bob Moose	2	14 2/3	1	0	3.68	7
Bill Short	6	2 1/3	0	0	3.86	1
Juan Pizarro	50	107	8	10	3.95	96
Woodie Fryman	28	113 1/3	3	8	4.05	74
Dennis Ribant	38	172	9	8	4.08	75
Vern Law	25	97	2	6	4.18	43
Pete Mikkelsen	32	56 1/3	1	2	4.31	30
Billy O'Dell	27	86 2/3	5	6	5.82	34
John Gelnar	10	19	0	1	8.05	5
Team totals	163	1,458 1/3	81	81	3.74	820

== Farm system ==
Level	Team	League	Manager
AAA	Columbus Jets	International League	Harding "Pete" Peterson
AA	Macon Peaches	Southern League	Don Osborn and Frank Oceak
A	Raleigh Pirates	Carolina League	Joe Morgan
A	Clinton Pirates	Midwest League	Bob Clear
A	Gastonia Pirates	Western Carolinas League	Don Leppert
Rookie	Salem Pirates	Appalachian League	Buddy Pritchard
