= 1967 San Francisco Giants season =

1967 San Francisco Giants
- League: National League
- Ballpark: Candlestick Park
- City: San Francisco, California
- Record: 91–71 (.562)
- League place: 2nd
- Owners: Horace Stoneham
- General managers: Chub Feeney
- Managers: Herman Franks
- Television: KTVU (Russ Hodges, Lon Simmons, Bill Thompson)
- Radio: KSFO (Russ Hodges, Lon Simmons, Bill Thompson)

The 1967 San Francisco Giants season was the Giants' 85th year in Major League Baseball, their tenth year in San Francisco since their move from New York following the 1957 season, and their eighth at Candlestick Park. The team finished in second place in the National League with a record of 91 wins and 71 losses, 10 1/2 games behind the NL and World Series champion St. Louis Cardinals.

== Offseason ==
- November 29, 1966: Hal Haydel was drafted by the Giants from the Chicago Cubs in the 1966 minor league draft.
- December 14, 1966: Len Gabrielson was traded by the Giants to the California Angels for Norm Siebern.
- January 28, 1967: Von Joshua was drafted by the Giants in the 1st round (17th pick) of the 1967 Major League Baseball draft, but did not sign.

== Regular season ==
- July 14, 1967: Eddie Mathews of the Atlanta Braves hit the 500th home run of his career. He hit his milestone homer off future Hall of Famer Juan Marichal of the Giants.

=== Season standings ===
National League
Team	W	L	Pct.	GB	Home	Road
St. Louis Cardinals	101	60	.627	—	49‍–‍32	52‍–‍28
San Francisco Giants	91	71	.562	10½	51‍–‍31	40‍–‍40
Chicago Cubs	87	74	.540	14	49‍–‍34	38‍–‍40
Cincinnati Reds	87	75	.537	14½	49‍–‍32	38‍–‍43
Philadelphia Phillies	82	80	.506	19½	45‍–‍35	37‍–‍45
Pittsburgh Pirates	81	81	.500	20½	49‍–‍32	32‍–‍49
Atlanta Braves	77	85	.475	24½	48‍–‍33	29‍–‍52
Los Angeles Dodgers	73	89	.451	28½	42‍–‍39	31‍–‍50
Houston Astros	69	93	.426	32½	46‍–‍35	23‍–‍58
New York Mets	61	101	.377	40½	36‍–‍42	25‍–‍59

=== Record vs. opponents ===
1967 National League record Sources:
Team	ATL	CHC	CIN	HOU	LAD	NYM	PHI	PIT	SF	STL
Atlanta	—	11–7	5–13	11–7	8–10	8–10	10–8	8–10	10–8	6–12
Chicago	7–11	—	12–6	8–10	9–9	13–5	11–7	11–7–1	10–8	6–11
Cincinnati	13–5	6–12	—	15–3	8–10	12–6	10–8	10–8	8–10	5–13
Houston	7–11	10–8	3–15	—	10–8	11–7	7–11	9–9	6–12	6–12
Los Angeles	10–8	9–9	10–8	8–10	—	12–6	6–12	7–11	5–13	6–12
New York	10–8	5–13	6–12	7–11	6–12	—	4–14	11–7	5–13	7–11
Philadelphia	7–11	7–11	8–10	11–7	12–6	14–4	—	8–10	8–10	6–12
Pittsburgh	10–8	7–11–1	8–10	9–9	11–7	7–11	10–8	—	8–10	11–7
San Francisco	8–10	8–10	10–8	12–6	13–5	13–5	10–8	10–8	—	7–11
St. Louis	12–6	11–6	13–5	12–6	12–6	11–7	12–6	7–11	11–7	—

=== Opening Day starters ===
- Jesús Alou
- Jim Davenport
- Tom Haller
- Jim Ray Hart
- Ken Henderson
- Hal Lanier
- Juan Marichal
- Willie Mays
- Willie McCovey

=== Notable transactions ===
- June 6, 1967: 1967 Major League Baseball draft
  - Dave Rader was drafted by the Giants in the 1st round (18th pick). Player signed June 14, 1967.
  - Don Carrithers was drafted by the Giants in the 3rd round.
  - Gary Lavelle was drafted by the Giants in the 20th round.
- June 22, 1967: Dick Groat was purchased by the Giants from the Philadelphia Phillies.
- July 15, 1967: Norm Siebern was purchased from the Giants by the Boston Red Sox.

=== Roster ===
1967 San Francisco Giants
Roster
Pitchers: 42 Bobby Bolin; 49 Ron Bryant; 50 Néstor Chávez; 28 Joe Gibbon; 45 Bill Henry; 34 Ron Herbel; 35 Frank Linzy; 27 Juan Marichal; 40 Mike McCormick; 39 Lindy McDaniel; 36 Gaylord Perry; 48 Rich Robertson; 37 Ray Sadecki	Catchers: 1 Bob Barton; 2 Dick Dietz; 5 Tom Haller; Infielders: 12 Jim Davenport; 17 Bobby Etheridge; 23 Tito Fuentes; 20 Dick Groat; 17,31 César Gutiérrez; 16 Jim Ray Hart; 7 Jack Hiatt; 22 Hal Lanier; 31,41 Don Mason; 44 Willie McCovey; 15 Bob Schroder; 29 Norm Siebern	Outfielders: 14 Jesús Alou; 25 Ollie Brown; 19 Ty Cline; 15 Ken Henderson; 19,33 Frank Johnson; 24 Willie Mays; 18 Billy Sorrell; Other batters: 18 Dave Marshall	Manager: 3 Herman Franks; Coaches: 9 Charlie Fox; 46 Larry Jansen; 8 Cookie Lavagetto; 6 Peanuts Lowrey

== Player stats ==
=== Batting ===
==== Starters by position ====
Note: Pos = Position; G = Games played; AB = At bats; H = Hits; Avg. = Batting average; HR = Home runs; RBI = Runs batted in

Pos	Player	G	AB	H	Avg.	HR	RBI
C	Tom Haller	141	455	114	.251	14	49
1B	Willie McCovey	135	456	126	.276	31	91
2B	Tito Fuentes	133	344	72	.209	5	29
3B	Jim Ray Hart	158	578	167	.289	29	99
SS	Hal Lanier	151	525	112	.213	0	42
LF	Jesús Alou	129	510	149	.292	5	30
CF	Willie Mays	141	486	128	.263	22	70
RF	Ollie Brown	120	412	110	.267	13	53

==== Other batters ====
Note: G = Games played; AB = At bats; H = Hits; Avg. = Batting average; HR = Home runs; RBI = Runs batted in

Player	G	AB	H	Avg.	HR	RBI
Jim Davenport	124	295	81	.275	5	30
Ken Henderson	65	179	34	.190	4	14
Jack Hiatt	73	153	42	.275	6	26
Bob Schroder	62	135	31	.230	0	7
Ty Cline	64	122	33	.270	0	4
Dick Dietz	56	120	27	.225	4	19
Bobby Etheridge	40	115	26	.226	1	15
Dick Groat	34	70	12	.171	0	4
Norm Siebern	46	58	9	.155	0	4
Cesar Gutierrez	18	21	3	.143	0	0
Bob Barton	7	19	4	.211	0	1
Billy Sorrell	18	17	3	.176	0	1
Frank Johnson	8	10	3	.300	0	0
Don Mason	4	3	0	.000	0	0
Dave Marshall	1	0	0	----	0	0

=== Pitching ===
==== Starting pitchers ====
Note: G = Games pitched; IP = Innings pitched; W = Wins; L = Losses; ERA = Earned run average; SO = Strikeouts

Player	G	IP	W	L	ERA	SO
Gaylord Perry	39	293.0	15	17	2.61	230
Mike McCormick	40	262.1	22	10	2.85	150
Juan Marichal	26	202.1	14	10	2.76	166
Ray Sadecki	35	188.0	12	6	2.78	145

==== Other pitchers ====
Note: G = Games pitched; IP = Innings pitched; W = Wins; L = Losses; ERA = Earned run average; SO = Strikeouts

Player	G	IP	W	L	ERA	SO
Ron Herbel	42	125.2	4	5	3.08	52
Bobby Bolin	37	120.0	6	8	4.88	69
Joe Gibbon	28	82.0	6	2	3.07	63

==== Relief pitchers ====
Note: G = Games pitched; IP = Innings pitched; W = Wins; L = Losses; SV = Saves; ERA = Earned run average; SO = Strikeouts

Player	G	IP	W	L	SV	ERA	SO
Frank Linzy	57	95.2	7	7	17	1.51	38
Lindy McDaniel	41	72.2	2	6	2	3.72	48
Bill Henry	28	21.2	2	0	2	2.08	23
Néstor Chávez	2	5.0	1	0	0	0.00	3
Ron Bryant	1	4.0	0	0	0	4.50	2
Rich Robertson	1	2.0	0	0	0	4.50	1

== Awards and honors ==
- Mike McCormick, Cy Young Award

All-Star Game

== Farm system ==
Level	Team	League	Manager
AAA	Phoenix Giants	Pacific Coast League	Bill Werle
AA	Waterbury Giants	Eastern League	Andy Gilbert
A	Fresno Giants	California League	Dave Garcia
A	Decatur Commodores	Midwest League	Dennis Sommers
A-Short Season	Medford Giants	Northwest League	Tony Eichelberger
Rookie	Salt Lake City Giants	Pioneer League	Harvey Koepf

LEAGUE CHAMPIONS: Medford
