= Larry Loughlin =

American baseball player (1941-1999)

- Pitcher
- Born: August 16, 1941; Tacoma, Washington, U.S.
- Died: January 26, 1999 (aged 57); Denver, Colorado, U.S.
- Batted: Left Threw: Left

MLB debut
- May 27, 1967, for the Philadelphia Phillies

Last MLB appearance
- June 14, 1967, for the Philadelphia Phillies

MLB statistics
- Win–loss record: 0–0
- Earned run average: 15.19
- Innings: 5 1/3
- Stats at Baseball Reference

Teams
- Philadelphia Phillies (1967)

Larry John Loughlin (August 16, 1941 – January 26, 1999) was an American relief pitcher in Major League Baseball who played briefly for the Philadelphia Phillies during the 1967 season. Listed at 6 ft 1 in (1.85 m), 190 pounds (86 kg), Loughlin batted and threw left-handed. He was born in Tacoma, Washington.

A star pitcher with the Santa Clara University baseball team, Loughlin played in the 1962 College World Series. He entered the major leagues in 1967 with the Phillies, appearing for them in three games. He posted a 15.19 ERA and did not have a decision or saves, giving up nine runs on nine hits and four walks while striking out five in 5 1/1 innings of work.

A double in his only MLB plate appearance left him with a rare career 1.000 batting average.

Following his majors career, Loughlin played in the California Angels and Montreal Expos minor league systems until 1970. After that, he worked as a mechanic in his native Tacoma.

Loughlin died in Denver, Colorado, at the age of 57.

== See also ==
- 1967 Philadelphia Phillies season
- Cup of coffee
