= Glen Clark (baseball) =

American baseball player (1940–2018)

- Pinch hitter
- Born: March 8, 1940; Austin, Texas, U.S.
- Died: January 25, 2018 (aged 77); Dallas, Texas, U.S.
- Batted: Switch Threw: Right

MLB debut
- June 3, 1967, for the Atlanta Braves

Last MLB appearance
- June 10, 1967, for the Atlanta Braves

MLB statistics
- Batting average: .000
- Stats at Baseball Reference

Teams
- Atlanta Braves (1967)

Glen Ester Clark (March 8, 1940 – January 25, 2018) was an American pinch hitter in Major League Baseball who played for the Atlanta Braves during the 1967 season. Listed at 6 ft 1 in (1.85 m), 190 lb., Clark was a switch-hitter and threw right-handed. He was born in Austin, Texas.

Clark was 26 years old when he entered the majors in 1967 with Atlanta, being limited to pinch-hitting duties. He appeared in four games and was hitless in four at-bats.

Clark died January 25, 2018.

== See also ==
- Cup of coffee
