= 1967 Major League Baseball season =

1967 MLB season
- League: American League (AL); National League (NL)
- Sport: Baseball
- Duration: Regular season: April 10 – October 1, 1967; World Series: October 4–12, 1967
- Games: 162
- Teams: 20 (10 per league)
- TV partner: NBC

Draft
- Top draft pick: Ron Blomberg
- Picked by: New York Yankees

Regular season
- Season MVP: AL: Carl Yastrzemski (BOS); NL: Orlando Cepeda (STL)
- AL champions: Boston Red Sox
- AL runners-up: Detroit Tigers
- NL champions: St. Louis Cardinals
- NL runners-up: San Francisco Giants

World Series
- Champions: St. Louis Cardinals
- Runners-up: Boston Red Sox
- World Series MVP: Bob Gibson (STL)

MLB seasons
- ← 1966 1968 →

Locations of teams for the 1966–1967 American League seasons
American League
Locations of teams for the 1966–1968 National League seasons
National League

The 1967 major league baseball season began on April 10, 1967. The regular season ended on October 1, with the St. Louis Cardinals and Boston Red Sox as the regular season champions of the National League and American League, respectively. The postseason began with Game 1 of the 64th World Series on October 4 and ended with Game 7 on October 12. In the second iteration of this World Series matchup, the Cardinals defeated the Red Sox, four games to three, capturing their eighth championship in franchise history, since their previous in 1964. Going into the season, the defending World Series champions were the Baltimore Orioles from the 1966 season.

The 38th All-Star Game was held on July 11 at Anaheim Stadium in Anaheim, California, home of California Angels. The National League won, 2–1.

It was the final season for the Kansas City Athletics, before relocating to Oakland, California and becoming the Oakland Athletics for the 1968 season.

The season was filled with historic seasons from multiple players. Carl Yastrzemski of the Boston Red Sox had tied for the most home runs in MLB with Harmon Killebrew, giving him the elusive triple crown. He led the American League in batting average (.326), home runs due to the tie with Killebrew (44) and runs batted in (121) (This feat would not be accomplished again until Miguel Cabrera earned the triple crown in 2012 with the Detroit Tigers). Yastrzemski also won the AL MVP and led the Red Sox to the AL pennant for the first time in two decades. They would ultimately lose to the St. Louis Cardinals 7–2 in Game 7 of the World Series.

The Cardinals had standout players as well, with first baseman Orlando Cepeda becoming the first unanimously voted NL MVP. Cepeda finished the season with 25 home runs, 111 RBIs and a .325 batting average. He did however, struggle in the World Series, hitting only .103 with one RBI.

== Schedule ==
The 1967 schedule consisted of 162 games for all teams in the American League and National League, each of which had 10 teams. Each team was scheduled to play 18 games against the other nine teams of their respective league. This continued the format put in place by the American League since the 1961 season and by the National League since the 1962 season, and would be used until 1969.

Opening Day took place on April 10, featuring two teams from each league. The final day of the regular season was on October 1, which saw all 20 teams play, continuing the trend from 1965. The World Series took place between October 4 and October 12.

== Rule changes ==
The 1967 season saw the following rule changes:

- Rules surrounding drafting college athletes were amended, with the adoption of the "four-year college rule". While previously, players could be drafted in the summer after their sophomore or junior years, players could now only be drafted following their senior year, with exceptions to 21-year-olds (before August 1 of their senior year), were considered to have met athletic eligibility, were dropped from their team because of academic reasons, or had spent at least 120 days out of school after quitting.
- The National League adopted the American League rule previously adopted in 1956, requiring a pitcher to be removed if the manager visited the pitcher's mound twice in the same inning.
- The American League adopted the National League rule that required a pitcher to be standing on the rubber to receive signs from the catcher.
- The minimum time a player must stay on the disabled list (now injured list) was increased from 15 to 21 days.
- If a ball is touched by a fielder, then makes contact with an umpire or a member of the offensive team, then is caught by another fielder, the result is a live ball, not a catch.
- If it is clear to the scorer, when a batter is bunting for a base hit and not for the purpose of advancing runners, the batter will be charged with a time at bat.
- Mental errors, unless specified in the rule book, or not scored as errors.

== Teams ==
League	Team	City	Ballpark	Capacity	Manager
American League	Baltimore Orioles	Baltimore, Maryland	Baltimore Memorial Stadium	52,185	Hank Bauer
American League	Boston Red Sox	Boston, Massachusetts	Fenway Park	33,524	Dick Williams
American League	California Angels	Anaheim, California	Anaheim Stadium	43,202	Bill Rigney
American League	Chicago White Sox	Chicago, Illinois	White Sox Park	46,550	Eddie Stanky
American League	Cleveland Indians	Cleveland, Ohio	Cleveland Stadium	74,056	Joe Adcock
American League	Detroit Tigers	Detroit, Michigan	Tiger Stadium	53,089	Mayo Smith
American League	Kansas City Athletics	Kansas City, Missouri	Municipal Stadium	34,165	Alvin Dark
American League	Kansas City Athletics	Kansas City, Missouri	Municipal Stadium	34,165	Luke Appling
American League	Minnesota Twins	Bloomington, Minnesota	Metropolitan Stadium	45,182	Sam Mele
American League	Minnesota Twins	Bloomington, Minnesota	Metropolitan Stadium	45,182	Cal Ermer
American League	New York Yankees	New York, New York	Yankee Stadium	67,000	Ralph Houk
American League	Washington Senators	Washington, D.C.	District of Columbia Stadium	43,500	Gil Hodges
National League	Atlanta Braves	Atlanta, Georgia	Atlanta Stadium	50,893	Billy Hitchcock
National League	Atlanta Braves	Atlanta, Georgia	Atlanta Stadium	50,893	Ken Silvestri
National League	Chicago Cubs	Chicago, Illinois	Wrigley Field	36,644	Leo Durocher
National League	Cincinnati Reds	Cincinnati, Ohio	Crosley Field	29,603	Dave Bristol
National League	Houston Astros	Houston, Texas	Houston Astrodome	46,000	Grady Hatton
National League	Los Angeles Dodgers	Los Angeles, California	Dodger Stadium	56,000	Walter Alston
National League	New York Mets	New York, New York	Shea Stadium	55,300	Wes Westrum
National League	New York Mets	New York, New York	Shea Stadium	55,300	Salty Parker
National League	Philadelphia Phillies	Philadelphia, Pennsylvania	Connie Mack Stadium	33,608	Gene Mauch
National League	Pittsburgh Pirates	Pittsburgh, Pennsylvania	Forbes Field	35,500	Harry Walker
National League	Pittsburgh Pirates	Pittsburgh, Pennsylvania	Forbes Field	35,500	Danny Murtaugh
National League	San Francisco Giants	San Francisco, California	Candlestick Park	42,500	Herman Franks
National League	St. Louis Cardinals	St. Louis, Missouri	Civic Center Busch Memorial Stadium	49,450	Red Schoendienst

== Standings ==
=== American League ===
American League
Team	W	L	Pct.	GB	Home	Road
Boston Red Sox	92	70	.568	—	49‍–‍32	43‍–‍38
Detroit Tigers	91	71	.562	1	52‍–‍29	39‍–‍42
Minnesota Twins	91	71	.562	1	52‍–‍29	39‍–‍42
Chicago White Sox	89	73	.549	3	49‍–‍33	40‍–‍40
California Angels	84	77	.522	7½	53‍–‍30	31‍–‍47
Washington Senators	76	85	.472	15½	40‍–‍40	36‍–‍45
Baltimore Orioles	76	85	.472	15½	35‍–‍42	41‍–‍43
Cleveland Indians	75	87	.463	17	36‍–‍45	39‍–‍42
New York Yankees	72	90	.444	20	43‍–‍38	29‍–‍52
Kansas City Athletics	62	99	.385	29½	37‍–‍44	25‍–‍55

=== National League ===
National League
Team	W	L	Pct.	GB	Home	Road
St. Louis Cardinals	101	60	.627	—	49‍–‍32	52‍–‍28
San Francisco Giants	91	71	.562	10½	51‍–‍31	40‍–‍40
Chicago Cubs	87	74	.540	14	49‍–‍34	38‍–‍40
Cincinnati Reds	87	75	.537	14½	49‍–‍32	38‍–‍43
Philadelphia Phillies	82	80	.506	19½	45‍–‍35	37‍–‍45
Pittsburgh Pirates	81	81	.500	20½	49‍–‍32	32‍–‍49
Atlanta Braves	77	85	.475	24½	48‍–‍33	29‍–‍52
Los Angeles Dodgers	73	89	.451	28½	42‍–‍39	31‍–‍50
Houston Astros	69	93	.426	32½	46‍–‍35	23‍–‍58
New York Mets	61	101	.377	40½	36‍–‍42	25‍–‍59

=== Tie games ===
3 tie games (2 in AL, 1 in NL), which are not factored into winning percentage or games behind (and were often replayed again) occurred throughout the season.

==== American League ====
The Minnesota had two tie games. The Detroit Tigers and New York Yankees had one tie each.

- June 21, Detroit Tigers vs. Minnesota Twins, tied at 5 in the middle of the ninth inning due to rain.
- July 25, New York Yankees vs. Minnesota Twins, tied at 1 after nine innings due to rain.

==== National League ====
The Chicago Cubs and Pittsburgh Pirates had one tie each.

- August 7, Chicago Cubs vs. Pittsburgh Pirates, tied at 3 after 14 innings on account of darkness. Game replayed on August 9.

== Postseason ==
The postseason began on October 4 and ended on October 12 with the St. Louis Cardinals defeating the Boston Red Sox in the 1967 World Series in seven games.

=== Bracket ===
World Series
AL	Boston Red Sox	3
NL	St. Louis Cardinals	4

== Managerial changes ==
=== Off-season ===
Team	Former Manager	New Manager
Boston Red Sox	Pete Runnels	Dick Williams
Cleveland Indians	George Strickland	Joe Adcock
Detroit Tigers	Frank Skaff	Mayo Smith

=== In-season ===
Team	Former Manager	New Manager
Atlanta Braves	Billy Hitchcock	Ken Silvestri
Kansas City Athletics	Alvin Dark	Luke Appling
Minnesota Twins	Sam Mele	Cal Ermer
New York Mets	Wes Westrum	Salty Parker
Pittsburgh Pirates	Harry Walker	Danny Murtaugh

== League leaders ==
=== American League ===
Hitting leaders
Stat	Player	Total
AVG	Carl Yastrzemski^{1} (BOS)	.326
OPS	Carl Yastrzemski (BOS)	1.040
HR	Harmon Killebrew (MIN); Carl Yastrzemski^{1} (BOS)	44
RBI	Carl Yastrzemski^{1} (BOS)	121
R	Carl Yastrzemski (BOS)	112
H	Carl Yastrzemski (BOS)	189
SB	Bert Campaneris (KCA)	55

^{1} American League Triple Crown batting winner

Pitching leaders
Stat	Player	Total
W	Jim Lonborg (BOS); Earl Wilson (DET)	22
L	George Brunet (CAL)	19
ERA	Joe Horlen (CWS)	2.06
K	Jim Lonborg (BOS)	246
IP	Dean Chance (MIN)	283.2
SV	Minnie Rojas (CAL)	27
WHIP	Joe Horlen (CWS)	0.953

=== National League ===
Hitting leaders
Stat	Player	Total
AVG	Roberto Clemente (PIT)	.357
OPS	Dick Allen (PHI)	.970
HR	Hank Aaron (ATL)	39
RBI	Orlando Cepeda (STL)	111
R	Hank Aaron (ATL); Lou Brock (STL)	113
H	Roberto Clemente (PIT)	209
SB	Lou Brock (STL)	52

Pitching leaders
Stat	Player	Total
W	Mike McCormick (SF)	22
L	Jack Fisher (NYM)	18
ERA	Phil Niekro (ATL)	1.87
K	Jim Bunning (PHI)	253
IP	Jim Bunning (PHI)	302.1
SV	Ted Abernathy (CIN)	28
WHIP	Dick Hughes (STL)	0.954

== Milestones ==
=== Batters ===
- Mickey Mantle (NYY):
  - Became the sixth player in Major League history to hit 500 home runs in the seventh inning against the Baltimore Orioles on May 14.
- Eddie Mathews (DET/HOU):
  - Became the seventh player in Major League history to hit 500 home runs as a part of the Houston Astros in the sixth inning against the San Francisco Giants on July 14.
- Frank Robinson (BAL):
  - Became the 13th player in Major League history to hit 400 home runs in the seventh inning against the Minnesota Twins on September 9.

=== Pitchers ===
==== No-hitters ====
- Steve Barber / Stu Miller (BAL):
  - The two pitchers combined to throw the sixth no-hitter in franchise history in a 2–1 loss to the Detroit Tigers on April 30. It was accomplished with three strikeouts, 10 walks, and two hit by pitch. Barber pitched the first eight and two-thirds innings. It is the second combined no-hitter in league history. This was the second instance of a team throwing a no-hitter but still losing a game.
- Don Wilson (HOU):
  - Wilson threw his first career no-hitter and third no-hitter in franchise history, defeating the Atlanta Braves 2–0 on June 18. He walked three and struck out 15.
- Dean Chance (MIN):
  - Chance threw his first career no-hitter and fourth no-hitter in franchise history, by defeating the Cleveland Indians 2–1 in game two of a doubleheader on August 25. He walked five and struck out eight.
- Joel Horlen (CWS):
  - Horlen threw his first career no-hitter and 12th no-hitter in franchise history, by defeating the Detroit Tigers 6–0 in game one of a doubleheader on September 10. He walked none, hit one by pitch, and struck out four.

== Awards and honors ==
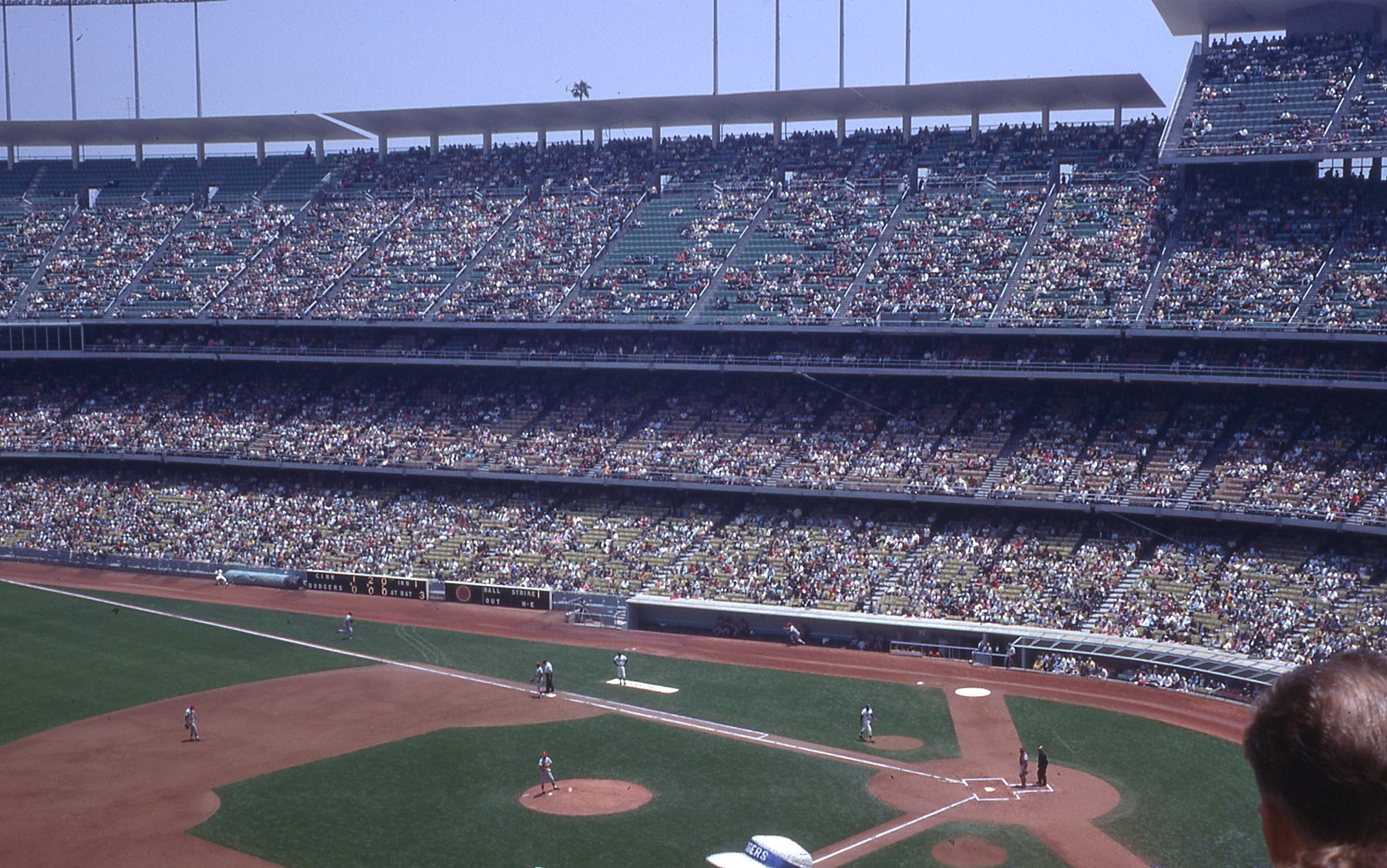
Dodgers vs. Reds at Dodger Stadium, June 1967

=== Regular season ===
Baseball Writers' Association of America Awards
BBWAA Award	National League	American League
Rookie of the Year	Tom Seaver (NYM)	Rod Carew (MIN)
Cy Young Award	Mike McCormick (SF)	Jim Lonborg (BOS)
Most Valuable Player	Orlando Cepeda (STL)	Carl Yastrzemski (BOS)
Babe Ruth Award (World Series MVP)	Lou Brock (STL)	—
Gold Glove Awards
Position	National League	American League
Pitcher	Bob Gibson (STL)	Jim Kaat (MIN)
Catcher	Randy Hundley (CHC)	Bill Freehan (DET)
1st Base	Wes Parker (LAD)	George Scott (BOS)
2nd Base	Bill Mazeroski (PIT)	Bobby Knoop (CAL)
3rd Base	Ron Santo (CHC)	Brooks Robinson (BAL)
Shortstop	Gene Alley (PIT)	Jim Fregosi (CAL)
Outfield	Roberto Clemente (PIT)	Paul Blair (BAL)
Outfield	Curt Flood (STL)	Al Kaline (DET)
Outfield	Willie Mays (SF)	Carl Yastrzemski (BOS)

=== Other awards ===
- Hutch Award: Carl Yastrzemski (BOS)
- Sport Magazine's World Series Most Valuable Player Award: Bob Gibson (STL)

The Sporting News Awards
Award	National League	American League
Player of the Year	—	Carl Yastrzemski (BOS)
Pitcher of the Year	Mike McCormick (SF)	Jim Lonborg (BOS)
Fireman of the Year (Relief pitcher)	Ted Abernathy (CIN)	Minnie Rojas (CAL)
Rookie Player of the Year	Lee May (CIN)	Rod Carew (MIN)
Rookie Pitcher of the Year	Dick Hughes (STL)	Tom Phoebus (BAL)
Comeback Player of the Year	Mike McCormick (SF)	Dean Chance (MIN)
Manager of the Year	—	Dick Williams (BOS)
Executive of the Year	—	Dick O'Connell (BOS)

=== Monthly awards ===
==== Player of the Month ====
Month	National League
May	Roberto Clemente (PIT)
June	Hank Aaron (ATL)
July	Jim Ray Hart (SF)
August	Orlando Cepeda (STL)

=== Baseball Hall of Fame ===
- Red Ruffing
- Lloyd Waner
- Branch Rickey (executive)

== Home field attendance ==
Team name	Wins	%±	Home attendance	%±	Per game
St. Louis Cardinals	101	21.7%	2,090,145	22.0%	25,804
Boston Red Sox	92	27.8%	1,727,832	113.0%	21,331
Los Angeles Dodgers	73	−23.2%	1,664,362	−36.4%	20,548
New York Mets	61	−7.6%	1,565,492	−19.0%	20,070
Minnesota Twins	91	2.2%	1,483,547	17.8%	18,315
Detroit Tigers	91	3.4%	1,447,143	28.7%	17,648
Atlanta Braves	77	−9.4%	1,389,222	−9.8%	17,151
Houston Astros	69	−4.2%	1,348,303	−28.0%	16,646
California Angels	84	5.0%	1,317,713	−5.9%	15,876
New York Yankees	72	2.9%	1,259,514	12.0%	15,360
San Francisco Giants	91	−2.2%	1,242,480	−25.0%	15,152
Chicago White Sox	89	7.2%	985,634	−0.4%	12,020
Chicago Cubs	87	47.5%	977,226	53.7%	11,634
Cincinnati Reds	87	14.5%	958,300	29.0%	11,831
Baltimore Orioles	76	−21.6%	955,053	−20.6%	12,403
Pittsburgh Pirates	81	−12.0%	907,012	−24.2%	11,198
Philadelphia Phillies	82	−5.7%	828,888	−25.2%	10,361
Washington Senators	76	7.0%	770,868	33.8%	9,636
Kansas City Athletics	62	−16.2%	726,639	−6.1%	8,971
Cleveland Indians	75	−7.4%	662,980	−26.6%	8,185

== Venues ==
The Kansas City Athletics would play their final two games at Municipal Stadium on September 27 in a doubleheader against the Chicago White Sox, relocating to Oakland, California at Oakland–Alameda County Coliseum for the start of the 1968 season.

== Media ==
=== Television ===
NBC was the exclusive national TV broadcaster of MLB, airing the weekend Game of the Week, the All-Star Game, and the World Series.

== See also ==
- 1967 in baseball (Events, Births, Deaths)
- 1967 Nippon Professional Baseball season
