= 1969 Montreal Expos season =

1969 Montreal Expos
- League: National League
- Division: East
- Ballpark: Jarry Park
- City: Montreal
- Record: 52–110 (.321)
- Divisional place: 6th
- Owners: Charles Bronfman
- General managers: Jim Fanning
- Managers: Gene Mauch
- Television: CBC Television (Hal Kelly, Jim Hearn); Télévision de Radio-Canada (Jean-Pierre Roy, Guy Ferron)
- Radio: CKGM (English) (Dave Van Horne, Russ Taylor); CKLM (French) (Jean-Paul Sarault, Jean-Pierre Roy)

The 1969 Montreal Expos season was the inaugural season in Major League Baseball for the team. The Expos, as typical for first-year expansion teams, finished in the cellar of the National League East with a 52–110 record, 48 games behind the eventual World Series Champion New York Mets. They did not win any game in extra innings during the year, which also featured a surprise no-hitter in just the ninth regular-season game they ever played. Their home attendance of 1,212,608, an average of 14,970 per game, was good for 7th in the N.L. The franchise would play in Montreal for 36 seasons until 2004 when the team relocated to Washington, D.C. and was rebranded as the Washington Nationals in 2005.

== Offseason ==
=== Expansion draft ===
The Montreal Expos participated in the 1968 Major League Baseball expansion draft on October 14, 1968.

| Player | Former team | Pick | Notes |
|---|---|---|---|
| Manny Mota | Pittsburgh Pirates | 2nd pick | |
| Mack Jones | Cincinnati Reds | 4th pick | |
| John Bateman | Houston Astros | 6th pick | |
| Gary Sutherland | Philadelphia Phillies | 8th pick | |
| Jack Billingham | Los Angeles Dodgers | 10th pick | Never played for the Expos. Sent to Houston just as the season was starting as part of a deal for Rusty Staub. |
| Donn Clendenon | Pittsburgh Pirates | 11th pick | |
| Jesús Alou | San Francisco Giants | 13th pick | Never played for the Expos. Sent to Houston as part of a deal for Rusty Staub. |
| Mike Wegener | Philadelphia Phillies | 15th pick | |
| Skip Guinn | Atlanta Braves | 17th pick | Never played for the Expos. Sent to Houston just as the season was starting as part of a deal for Rusty Staub. |
| Bill Stoneman | Chicago Cubs | 19th pick | |
| Maury Wills | Pittsburgh Pirates | 21st pick | |
| Bobby Wine | Philadelphia Phillies | 23rd pick | |
| Bob Reynolds | San Francisco Giants | 25th pick | |
| Dan McGinn | Cincinnati Reds | 27th pick | |
| José Herrera | Houston Astros | 29th pick | |
| Jimy Williams | Cincinnati Reds | 32nd pick | Never played for the Expos. Only major league experience was in 1966 and '67. |
| Remy Hermoso | Atlanta Braves | 34th pick | |
| Mudcat Grant | Los Angeles Dodgers | 36th pick | |
| Jerry Robertson | St. Louis Cardinals | 38th pick | |
| Don Shaw | New York Mets | 40th pick | |
| Ty Cline | San Francisco Giants | 41st pick | |
| Garry Jestadt | Chicago Cubs | 43rd pick | |
| Carl Morton | Atlanta Braves | 45th pick | |
| Larry Jaster | St. Louis Cardinals | 47th pick | |
| Ernie McAnally | New York Mets | 49th pick | Didn't make it to the big league squad until 1971. |
| Jim Fairey | Los Angeles Dodgers | 52nd pick | |
| Coco Laboy | St. Louis Cardinals | 54th pick | |
| John Boccabella | Chicago Cubs | 56th pick | |
| Ron Brand | Houston Astros | 58th pick | |
| John Glass | New York Mets | 60th pick | Never played in the major leagues |

=== Other transactions ===
- October 16, 1968: Don Bosch was purchased by the Expos from the New York Mets.
- October 21, 1968: Bob Bailey was purchased by the Expos from the Los Angeles Dodgers.
- December 2, 1968: Floyd Wicker was drafted by the Expos from the St. Louis Cardinals in the 1968 rule 5 draft.
- January 22, 1969: Donn Clendenon and Jesús Alou were traded by the Expos to the Houston Astros for Rusty Staub. Clendenon refused to report to his new team. The Expos sent Jack Billingham, Skip Guinn, and $100,000 to the Astros on April 8 as compensation.

=== 1968 MLB June amateur draft ===
The Expos and San Diego Padres, along with the two American League expansion teams set to debut in 1969, the Kansas City Royals and Seattle Pilots, were allowed to participate in the June 1968 MLB first-year player draft, although the new teams were barred from the lottery's first three rounds. The Expos drafted only 15 players in the 1968 June draft, and none reached the major leagues. All but five went unsigned.

== Spring training ==
The Expos held spring training at West Palm Beach Municipal Stadium in West Palm Beach, Florida, a facility they shared with the Atlanta Braves. It was destined to become their long-time spring training home: they trained there through 1972 and from 1981 through 1997.

== Regular season ==
=== Milestones ===
- First international game in MLB history, Mel Steiner home plate umpire on April 14, 1969 at Jarry Park Stadium.
- First hit and extra-base hit in franchise history: Bob Bailey, a double in the first inning
- First home run: relief pitcher Dan McGinn, a two-run shot off future Baseball Hall of Famer Tom Seaver in the fourth

==== Scorecard ====
April 8, Shea Stadium, New York City, New York

| Team | 1 | 2 | 3 | 4 | 5 | 6 | 7 | 8 | 9 | R | H | E |
|---|---|---|---|---|---|---|---|---|---|---|---|---|
| Montreal | 2 | 0 | 1 | 1 | 0 | 2 | 1 | 4 | 0 | 11 | 12 | 0 |
| New York | 0 | 3 | 0 | 3 | 0 | 0 | 0 | 0 | 4 | 10 | 15 | 3 |
W: Shaw (1–0) L: Koonce (0–1) SV: Sembera (1)
HRs: McGinn (1), Staub (1), Laboy (1), Dyer (1)

=== Opening Day lineup ===
Opening Day Starters
| # | Name | Position |
|---|---|---|
| 30 | Maury Wills | SS |
| 1 | Gary Sutherland | 2B |
| 10 | Rusty Staub | RF |
| 9 | Mack Jones | LF |
| 3 | Bob Bailey | 1B |
| 2 | John Bateman | C |
| 39 | Coco Laboy | 3B |
| 43 | Don Hahn | CF |
| 22 | Mudcat Grant | P |

==== Others ====
- April 14, 1969: Mack Jones hit a three-run home run and two-run triple that highlighted an 8–7 win over the St. Louis Cardinals in the Expos' first home victory as a franchise at Jarry Park. Jones' blast was also the first MLB home run hit outside the United States. Dan McGinn became the first MLB pitcher to win a game outside the United States.
- April 17, 1969: In just the franchise's ninth game in existence, Bill Stoneman pitched a 7–0 no-hitter while striking out 8 batters against the Philadelphia Phillies at Connie Mack Stadium. Johnny Briggs made the final out for the Phillies. Le Grand Orange Rusty Staub was the hitting hero for the Expos going 4 for 5 with three doubles and a homer. A crowd of 6,496 were on hand to see it in Philadelphia. Stoneman pitched another 7–0 no-hitter in 1972, against the New York Mets in Jarry Park on October 2.

=== Season standings ===
NL East
| Team | W | L | Pct. | GB | Home | Road |
|---|---|---|---|---|---|---|
| New York Mets | 100 | 62 | .617 | — | 52‍–‍30 | 48‍–‍32 |
| Chicago Cubs | 92 | 70 | .568 | 8 | 49‍–‍32 | 43‍–‍38 |
| Pittsburgh Pirates | 88 | 74 | .543 | 12 | 47‍–‍34 | 41‍–‍40 |
| St. Louis Cardinals | 87 | 75 | .537 | 13 | 42‍–‍38 | 45‍–‍37 |
| Philadelphia Phillies | 63 | 99 | .389 | 37 | 30‍–‍51 | 33‍–‍48 |
| Montreal Expos | 52 | 110 | .321 | 48 | 24‍–‍57 | 28‍–‍53 |

=== Record vs. opponents ===
1969 National League record Sources:
| Team | ATL | CHC | CIN | HOU | LAD | MON | NYM | PHI | PIT | SD | SF | STL |
|---|---|---|---|---|---|---|---|---|---|---|---|---|
| Atlanta | — | 3–9 | 12–6 | 15–3 | 9–9 | 8–4 | 4–8 | 6–6 | 8–4 | 13–5 | 9–9 | 6–6 |
| Chicago | 9–3 | — | 6–6–1 | 8–4 | 6–6 | 10–8 | 8–10 | 12–6 | 7–11 | 11–1 | 6–6 | 9–9 |
| Cincinnati | 6–12 | 6–6–1 | — | 9–9 | 10–8 | 8–4 | 6–6 | 10–2 | 5–7 | 11–7 | 10–8 | 8–4 |
| Houston | 3–15 | 4–8 | 9–9 | — | 6–12 | 11–1 | 10–2 | 8–4 | 3–9 | 10–8 | 10–8 | 7–5 |
| Los Angeles | 9–9 | 6–6 | 8–10 | 12–6 | — | 10–2 | 4–8 | 8–4 | 8–4 | 12–6 | 5–13 | 3–9 |
| Montreal | 4–8 | 8–10 | 4–8 | 1–11 | 2–10 | — | 5–13 | 11–7 | 5–13 | 4–8 | 1–11 | 7–11 |
| New York | 8–4 | 10–8 | 6–6 | 2–10 | 8–4 | 13–5 | — | 12–6 | 10–8 | 11–1 | 8–4 | 12–6 |
| Philadelphia | 6-6 | 6–12 | 2–10 | 4–8 | 4–8 | 7–11 | 6–12 | — | 10–8 | 8–4 | 3–9 | 7–11 |
| Pittsburgh | 4–8 | 11–7 | 7–5 | 9–3 | 4–8 | 13–5 | 8–10 | 8–10 | — | 10–2 | 5–7 | 9–9 |
| San Diego | 5–13 | 1–11 | 7–11 | 8–10 | 6–12 | 8–4 | 1–11 | 4–8 | 2–10 | — | 6–12 | 4–8 |
| San Francisco | 9–9 | 6–6 | 8–10 | 8–10 | 13–5 | 11–1 | 4–8 | 9–3 | 7–5 | 12–6 | — | 3–9 |
| St. Louis | 6–6 | 9–9 | 4–8 | 5–7 | 9–3 | 11–7 | 6–12 | 11–7 | 9–9 | 8–4 | 9–3 | — |

=== Notable transactions ===
- April 27, 1969: Roy Face was signed as a free agent by the Expos.
- June 3, 1969: Mudcat Grant was traded by the Expos to the St. Louis Cardinals for Gary Waslewski.
- June 11, 1969: Maury Wills and Manny Mota were traded by the Expos to the Los Angeles Dodgers for Ron Fairly and Paul Popovich.
- June 11, 1969: Paul Popovich was traded by the Expos to the Chicago Cubs for Adolfo Phillips and Jack Lamabe.
- June 15, 1969: Donn Clendenon was traded by the Expos to the New York Mets for Kevin Collins, Steve Renko, Bill Carden (minors) and Dave Colon (minors).
- August 15, 1969: Roy Face was released by the Expos.
- August 19, 1969: Claude Raymond was purchased by the Expos from the Atlanta Braves.
- September 13, 1969: Marv Staehle was purchased by the Expos from the Seattle Pilots.

==== Draft picks ====
- June 5, 1969: Terry Humphrey was drafted by the Expos in the 39th round of the 1969 Major League Baseball draft.

== Roster ==
1969 Montreal Expos
Roster
| Pitchers: 14 Roy Face; 22 Mudcat Grant; 21 Larry Jaster; 22 Leo Marentette; 25 Dan McGinn; 44 Carl Morton; 22,17 Dick Radatz; 16 Claude Raymond; 29 Howie Reed; 18 Steve Renko; 42 Bob Reynolds; 27 Jerry Robertson; 28 Carroll Sembera; 23 Don Shaw; 46 Steve Shea; 26 Bill Stoneman; 47 Gary Waslewski; 24 Mike Wegener | Catchers: 2 John Bateman; 12 John Boccabella; 11 Ron Brand; Infielders: 3 Bob Bailey; 17 Donn Clendenon; 8 Kevin Collins; 6 Ron Fairly; 37 Remy Hermoso; 41 Garry Jestadt; 39 Coco Laboy; 14 Marv Staehle; 1 Gary Sutherland; 30 Maury Wills; 7 Bobby Wine | Outfielders: 19 Don Bosch; 5 Ty Cline; 35 Jim Fairey; 43 Don Hahn; 38 José Herrera; 9 Mack Jones; 15 Manny Mota; 20 Adolfo Phillips; 10 Rusty Staub; 36 Floyd Wicker | Manager: 4 Gene Mauch; Coaches: 33 Peanuts Lowrey (Third Base); 32 Cal McLish (Pitching); 34 Bob Oldis (First Base); 31 Jerry Zimmerman (Bullpen) |

== Player stats ==
| = Indicates team leader |

=== Batting ===
==== Starters by position ====
Note: Pos = Position; G = Games played; AB = At bats; R = Runs scored; H = Hits; Avg. = Batting average; HR = Home runs; RBI = Runs batted in; SB = Stolen bases

| Pos | Player | G | AB | R | H | Avg. | HR | RBI | SB |
|---|---|---|---|---|---|---|---|---|---|
| C | Ron Brand | 103 | 287 | 19 | 74 | .258 | 0 | 20 | 2 |
| 1B | Bob Bailey | 111 | 358 | 46 | 95 | .265 | 9 | 53 | 3 |
| 2B | Gary Sutherland | 141 | 544 | 63 | 130 | .239 | 3 | 35 | 5 |
| 3B | Coco Laboy | 157 | 562 | 53 | 145 | .258 | 18 | 83 | 0 |
| SS | Bobby Wine | 121 | 370 | 23 | 74 | .200 | 3 | 25 | 0 |
| LF | Mack Jones | 135 | 455 | 73 | 123 | .270 | 22 | 79 | 6 |
| CF | Adolfo Phillips | 58 | 199 | 25 | 43 | .216 | 4 | 7 | 6 |
| RF | Rusty Staub | 158 | 549 | 89 | 166 | .302 | 29 | 79 | 3 |

==== Other batters ====
Note: G = Games played; AB = At bats; R = Runs scored; H = Hits; Avg. = Batting average; HR = Home runs; RBI = Runs batted in; SB = Stolen bases

| Player | G | AB | R | H | Avg. | HR | RBI | SB |
|---|---|---|---|---|---|---|---|---|
| Ron Fairly | 70 | 253 | 35 | 73 | .289 | 12 | 39 | 1 |
| John Bateman | 74 | 235 | 16 | 49 | .209 | 8 | 19 | 0 |
| Ty Cline | 101 | 209 | 26 | 50 | .239 | 2 | 12 | 4 |
| Maury Wills | 47 | 189 | 23 | 42 | .222 | 0 | 8 | 15 |
| Donn Clendenon | 38 | 129 | 14 | 31 | .240 | 4 | 14 | 0 |
| José Herrera | 47 | 126 | 7 | 36 | .286 | 2 | 12 | 1 |
| Don Bosch | 49 | 112 | 13 | 20 | .179 | 1 | 4 | 1 |
| Kevin Collins | 52 | 96 | 5 | 23 | .240 | 2 | 12 | 0 |
| Manny Mota | 31 | 89 | 6 | 28 | .315 | 0 | 0 | 1 |
| John Boccabella | 40 | 86 | 4 | 9 | .105 | 1 | 6 | 1 |
| Remy Hermoso | 28 | 74 | 6 | 12 | .162 | 0 | 3 | 3 |
| Jim Fairey | 20 | 49 | 6 | 14 | .286 | 1 | 6 | 0 |
| Floyd Wicker | 41 | 39 | 2 | 4 | .103 | 0 | 2 | 0 |
| Marv Staehle | 6 | 17 | 4 | 7 | .412 | 1 | 1 | 0 |
| Don Hahn | 4 | 9 | 0 | 1 | .111 | 0 | 2 | 0 |
| Garry Jestadt | 6 | 6 | 1 | 0 | .000 | 0 | 1 | 0 |

=== Pitching ===
==== Starting pitchers ====
Note: G = Games pitched; IP = Innings pitched; W = Wins; L = Losses; ERA = Earned run average; SO = Strikeouts

| Player | G | IP | W | L | ERA | SO |
|---|---|---|---|---|---|---|
| Bill Stoneman | 42 | 235.2 | 11 | 19 | 4.39 | 185 |
| Jerry Robertson | 38 | 179.2 | 5 | 16 | 3.96 | 133 |
| Mike Wegener | 32 | 165.2 | 5 | 14 | 4.40 | 124 |
| Steve Renko | 18 | 103.1 | 6 | 7 | 4.01 | 68 |
| Mudcat Grant | 11 | 50.2 | 1 | 6 | 4.80 | 20 |
| Bob Reynolds | 1 | 1.1 | 0 | 0 | 20.25 | 2 |

==== Other pitchers ====
Note: G = Games pitched; IP = Innings pitched; W = Wins; L = Losses; ERA = Earned run average; SO = Strikeouts

| Player | G | IP | W | L | ERA | SO |
|---|---|---|---|---|---|---|
| Gary Waslewski | 30 | 109.1 | 3 | 7 | 3.29 | 63 |
| Howie Reed | 31 | 106.0 | 6 | 7 | 4.84 | 59 |
| Larry Jaster | 24 | 77.0 | 1 | 6 | 5.49 | 39 |
| Carl Morton | 8 | 29.1 | 0 | 3 | 4.60 | 16 |

==== Relief pitchers ====
Note: G = Games pitched; W = Wins; L = Losses; SV = Saves; ERA = Earned run average; SO = Strikeouts

| Player | G | W | L | SV | ERA | SO |
|---|---|---|---|---|---|---|
| Dan McGinn | 74 | 7 | 10 | 6 | 3.94 | 112 |
| Roy Face | 44 | 4 | 2 | 5 | 3.94 | 34 |
| Don Shaw | 35 | 2 | 5 | 1 | 5.21 | 45 |
| Carroll Sembera | 23 | 0 | 2 | 2 | 3.55 | 15 |
| Dick Radatz | 22 | 0 | 4 | 3 | 5.71 | 32 |
| Claude Raymond | 15 | 1 | 2 | 1 | 4.09 | 11 |
| Steve Shea | 10 | 0 | 0 | 0 | 2.87 | 11 |
| Leo Marentette | 3 | 0 | 0 | 0 | 6.75 | 4 |

== Awards and honors ==
1969 Major League Baseball All-Star Game

- Rusty Staub, reserve

== Farm system ==
| Level | Team | League | Manager |
|---|---|---|---|
| AAA | Vancouver Mounties | Pacific Coast League | Bob Lemon |
| A | West Palm Beach Expos | Florida State League | Ed Sadowski |
| Rookie | GCL Expos | Gulf Coast League | J. W. Porter |

LEAGUE CHAMPIONS: GCL Expos

On June 5, 1969 the Montreal Expos played a game against their farm team the Vancouver Mounties, the Mounties won 5-3.

Vancouver affiliation shared with Seattle Pilots
