= 1970 Montreal Expos season =

1970 Montreal Expos
- League: National League
- Division: East
- Ballpark: Jarry Park
- City: Montreal
- Record: 73–89 (.451)
- Divisional place: 6th
- Owners: Charles Bronfman
- General managers: Jim Fanning
- Managers: Gene Mauch
- Television: CBC Television (Hal Kelly, Don Drysdale); Télévision de Radio-Canada (Jean-Pierre Roy, Guy Ferron)
- Radio: CFCF (English) (Dave Van Horne, Russ Taylor); CKLM (French) (Jean-Paul Sarault, Jean-Pierre Roy)

The 1970 Montreal Expos season was the second season in the history of the franchise. The Expos finished in last place in the National League East with a record of 73–89, 16 games behind the Pittsburgh Pirates. The Expos won 21 more games than in their inaugural season in 1969.

== Offseason ==
- December 3, 1969: Jerry Robertson was traded by the Expos to the Detroit Tigers for Joe Sparma.

== Spring training ==
The Expos held spring training at West Palm Beach Municipal Stadium in West Palm Beach, Florida, a facility they shared with the Atlanta Braves. It was their second season at the stadium.

== Regular season ==
=== Season standings ===
NL East
Team	W	L	Pct.	GB	Home	Road
Pittsburgh Pirates	89	73	.549	—	50‍–‍32	39‍–‍41
Chicago Cubs	84	78	.519	5	46‍–‍34	38‍–‍44
New York Mets	83	79	.512	6	44‍–‍38	39‍–‍41
St. Louis Cardinals	76	86	.469	13	34‍–‍47	42‍–‍39
Philadelphia Phillies	73	88	.453	15½	40‍–‍40	33‍–‍48
Montreal Expos	73	89	.451	16	39‍–‍41	34‍–‍48

=== Record vs. opponents ===
1970 National League record Sources:
Team	ATL	CHC	CIN	HOU	LAD	MON	NYM	PHI	PIT	SD	SF	STL
Atlanta	—	8–4	5–13	9–9	6–12	6–6	6–6	7–5	6–6	9–9	7–11	7–5
Chicago	4–8	—	7–5	7–5	6–6	13–5	7–11	9–9	8–10	9–3	7–5	7–11
Cincinnati	13–5	5–7	—	15–3	13–5	7–5	8–4	7–5	8–4	8–10	9–9	9–3
Houston	9–9	5–7	3–15	—	8–10	8–4	6–6	4–8	6–6	14–4	10–8	6–6
Los Angeles	12–6	6–6	5–13	10–8	—	8–4	7–5	6–5	6–6	11–7	9–9	7–5
Montreal	6–6	5–13	5–7	4–8	4–8	—	10–8	11–7	9–9	6–6	6–6	7–11
New York	6–6	11–7	4–8	6–6	5–7	8–10	—	13–5	6–12	6–6	6–6	12–6
Philadelphia	5-7	9–9	5–7	8–4	5–6	7–11	5–13	—	4–14	9–3	8–4	8–10
Pittsburgh	6–6	10–8	4–8	6–6	6–6	9–9	12–6	14–4	—	6–6	4–8	12–6
San Diego	9–9	3–9	10–8	4–14	7–11	6–6	6–6	3–9	6–6	—	5–13	4–8
San Francisco	11–7	5–7	9–9	8–10	9–9	6–6	6–6	4–8	8–4	13–5	—	7–5
St. Louis	5–7	11–7	3–9	6–6	5–7	11–7	6–12	10–8	6–12	8–4	5–7	—

=== Opening Day starters ===
- John Boccabella
- Ron Fairly
- Mack Jones
- Coco Laboy
- Adolfo Phillips
- Marv Staehle
- Rusty Staub
- Bill Stoneman
- Bobby Wine

=== Notable transactions ===
- April 22, 1970: Garry Jestadt was traded by the Expos to the Chicago Cubs for Jim Qualls.
- May 19, 1970: Don Shaw was purchased from the Expos by the St. Louis Cardinals.
- June 15, 1970: José Herrera was traded by the Expos to the Milwaukee Brewers for John O'Donoghue.
- June 15, 1970: Ty Cline was traded by the Expos to the Cincinnati Reds for Clyde Mashore.
- June 22, 1970: Bombo Rivera was signed as an amateur free agent by the Expos.
- June 23, 1970: Don Bosch was traded by the Expos to the Houston Astros for Mike Marshall.
- August 2, 1970: Kevin Collins was purchased from the Expos by the Detroit Tigers.
- August 20, 1970: Floyd Wicker was purchased from the Expos by the Milwaukee Brewers.

==== Draft picks ====
- June 4, 1970: 1970 Major League Baseball draft
  - Pat Scanlon was drafted by the Expos in the 5th round.
  - Jerry White was drafted by the Expos in the 14th round.

== Roster ==
1970 Montreal Expos
Roster
Pitchers: 17 Bill Dillman; 30 Ken Johnson; 28 Mike Marshall; 25 Dan McGinn; 15 Balor Moore; 44 Carl Morton; 22 Rich Nye; 23 John O'Donoghue; 16 Claude Raymond; 29 Howie Reed; 18 Steve Renko; 28 Carroll Sembera; 21 Joe Sparma; 26 Bill Stoneman; 36 John Strohmayer; 47 Gary Waslewski; 24 Mike Wegener	Catchers: 2 John Bateman; 22 Jack Hiatt; Infielders: 3 Bob Bailey; 12 John Boccabella; 11 Ron Brand; 6 Ron Fairly; 37 Remy Hermoso; 39 Coco Laboy; 8 Jim Qualls; 14 Marv Staehle; 1 Gary Sutherland; 23 Fred Whitfield; 7 Bobby Wine	Outfielders: 37 Boots Day; 35 Jim Fairey; 42 Jim Gosger; 43 Don Hahn; 9 Mack Jones; 5 Clyde Mashore; 20 Adolfo Phillips; 10 Rusty Staub; Other batters: 5 Ty Cline; 38 José Herrera	Manager: 4 Gene Mauch; Coaches: 34 Jim Bragan (First base); 32 Cal McLish (Pitching); 33 Dick Williams (Hitting/Third base); 31 Jerry Zimmerman (Bullpen)

== Player stats ==
=== Batting ===
==== Starters by position ====
Note: Pos = Position; G = Games played; AB = At bats; H = Hits; Avg. = Batting average; HR = Home runs; RBI = Runs batted in

Pos	Player	G	AB	H	Avg.	HR	RBI
C	John Bateman	139	520	123	.237	15	68
1B	Ron Fairly	119	385	111	.288	15	61
2B	Gary Sutherland	116	359	74	.206	3	26
SS	Bobby Wine	159	501	116	.232	3	51
3B	Coco Laboy	137	432	86	.199	5	53
LF	Mack Jones	108	271	65	.240	14	32
CF	Adolfo Phillips	92	214	51	.238	6	21
RF	Rusty Staub	160	569	156	.274	30	94

==== Other batters ====
Note: G = Games played; AB = At bats; H = Hits; Avg. = Batting average; HR = Home runs; RBI = Runs batted in

Player	G	AB	H	Avg.	HR	RBI
Bob Bailey	131	352	101	.287	28	84
Marv Staehle	104	321	70	.218	0	26
Jim Gosger	91	274	72	.263	5	37
Jim Fairey	92	211	51	.242	3	25
Don Hahn	82	149	38	.255	0	8
John Boccabella	61	145	39	.269	5	17
Ron Brand	72	126	30	.238	0	9
Boots Day	41	108	29	.269	0	5
Jack Hiatt	17	43	14	.326	0	7
Clyde Mashore	13	25	4	.160	1	3
Fred Whitfield	4	15	1	.067	0	0
Jim Qualls	9	9	1	.111	0	1
Ty Cline	2	2	1	.500	0	0
Remy Hermoso	4	1	0	.000	0	0
José Herrera	1	1	0	.000	0	0

=== Pitching ===
==== Starting pitchers ====
Note: G = Games pitched; IP = Innings pitched; W = Wins; L = Losses; ERA = Earned run average; SO = Strikeouts

Player	G	IP	W	L	ERA	SO
Carl Morton	43	284.2	18	11	3.60	154
Steve Renko	41	222.2	13	11	4.32	142
Bill Stoneman	40	207.2	7	15	4.59	176
Rich Nye	8	46.1	3	2	4.08	21

==== Other pitchers ====
Note: G = Games pitched; IP = Innings pitched; W = Wins; L = Losses; ERA = Earned run average; SO = Strikeouts

Player	G	IP	W	L	ERA	SO
Dan McGinn	52	130.2	7	10	5.44	83
Mike Wegener	25	104.1	3	6	5.26	35
Mike Marshall	24	64.2	3	7	3.48	38
Joe Sparma	9	29.1	0	4	7.06	23
Gary Waslewski	6	24.2	0	2	5.11	19
John O'Donoghue	9	22.1	2	3	5.24	6
Balor Moore	6	9.2	0	2	7.45	6

==== Relief pitchers ====
Note: G = Games pitched; W = Wins; L = Losses; SV = Saves; ERA = Earned run average; SO = Strikeouts

Player	G	W	L	SV	ERA	SO
Claude Raymond	59	6	7	23	4.43	68
Howie Reed	57	6	5	5	3.13	42
John Strohmayer	42	3	1	0	4.86	74
Bill Dillman	18	2	3	0	5.28	17
Carroll Sembera	5	0	0	0	18.90	6
Ken Johnson	3	0	0	0	7.50	4

== Awards and honors ==
- Rusty Staub: All-Star reserve
- Carl Morton: National League Rookie of the Year

== Farm system ==
Level	Team	League	Manager
AAA	Buffalo Bisons/ Winnipeg Whips	International League	Clyde McCullough
AA	Jacksonville Suns	Southern League	Gus Niarhos
A	West Palm Beach Expos	Florida State League	J. W. Porter
A-Short Season	Watertown Expos	Northern League	Bobby Malkmus
Rookie	GCL Expos	Gulf Coast League	Ed Sadowski

Buffalo franchise moved to Winnipeg and renamed, June 11, 1970; Jacksonville affiliation shared with Milwaukee Brewers
