= Winnipeg Whips =

Former Triple-A baseball team

- 1970–1971; Winnipeg, Manitoba

Minor league affiliations
- Class: Triple-A (1970–1971)
- League: International League (1970–1971)

Major league affiliations
- Team: Montreal Expos (1970–1971)

Team data
- Name: Winnipeg Whips (1970–1971)
- Ballpark: Winnipeg Stadium

The Winnipeg Whips were a professional Triple-A minor league baseball team based in Winnipeg, Manitoba, Canada that played in the International League from 1970 to 1971. The team was affiliated with the Montreal Expos of Major League Baseball and played its home games at Winnipeg Stadium.

== From Buffalo to Winnipeg ==
The franchise was founded as the Buffalo Bisons, a founding member of the International League in 1886. The Expos purchased the Bisons shortly after joining the National League in 1969 and were eager to relocate the struggling team. In 1969, the Bisons played some home games in Niagara Falls and finished next-to-last in the eight-team IL both in the standings (56-78) and at the box office (only 77,808 found their way through the turnstiles). The following year, after a 10–35 start, even worse attendance and the player's locker room at the aging War Memorial Stadium being robbed, the Expos had enough and relocated the franchise to Winnipeg. The Expos' choice of the Manitoba city seemed logical -- like the parent club, Winnipeg was in Canada, and the city had just lost their longtime Northern League team after the 1969 season -- but "Winterpeg" was located a whopping 1,100 miles from the nearest league rival, Toledo, Ohio. So, as part of the move, the Expos agreed to pick up the additional travel costs of opposing teams, believing it would be a temporary measure until the Whips could switch to the American Association, a Triple-A league operating in the Midwestern United States, closer to Winnipeg (although not that much closer; Des Moines was the nearest AA city and still over 600 miles away). Clyde McCullough managed the team at its inception.

The Whips did not fare well on the field or at the gate, again finishing next-to-last in the standings and in attendance in 1970. Things got even worse in 1971 -- the third-year Expos barely had enough quality players at the major league level, let alone for their minor-league affiliates -- as the Whips only won 44 of its 140 games, and only 17 of its final 74. McCullough was replaced as manager during the year by Jim Bragan, and Steve Shea would also take his turn as manager of the ballclub. Skyrocketing costs and continued poor attendance figures (they drew only 88,438 in 1971, again next-to-last in the IL) coupled with the failed bid to join the American Association, forced the Expos to give up on Winnipeg and move the team to Hampton, Virginia after the 1971 season. (Winnipeg would be without pro baseball for a generation, until the Winnipeg Goldeyes joined the reborn, independent Northern League in 1994.)

== After Winnipeg ==
After spending 87 years in Buffalo, the franchise was sent wandering for the next few decades. In 1972, the team became the Peninsula Whips and played two seasons out of Hampton War Memorial Stadium, located just 19 miles from the IL's Tidewater Tides. After drawing only 48,680 fans in 1973, the AAA franchise was moved to Memphis and played in the International League as the Memphis Blues through 1976. The following year, the club pulled up stakes again and moved to Charleston, West Virginia and assumed the identity of the Charleston Charlies, who had relocated to Columbus, Ohio. After a five-year stint (1984–1988) in Old Orchard Beach, Maine as the Maine Guides, the franchise founded as the Buffalo Bisons and once known as the Winnipeg Whips is now playing out of Moosic, Pennsylvania as the Scranton/Wilkes-Barre RailRiders.

== Major League alumni ==
- John Bateman
- Gil Blanco
- Don Bosch
- Kevin Collins
- Boots Day
- Bill Dillman
- Pepe Frías
- Jim Gosger
- Rich Hacker
- Don Hahn
- Larry Haney
- Remy Hermoso
- José Herrera
- Walt Hriniak
- Terry Humphrey
- Garry Jestadt
- Larry Loughlin
- Leo Marentette
- Mike Marshall
- Clyde Mashore
- Ernie McAnally
- Dave McDonald
- Dan McGinn
- Joe Moock
- Balor Moore
- Rich Nye
- John O'Donoghue
- Adolfo Phillips
- Jim Qualls
- Bob Reynolds
- Steve Rogers
- Carroll Sembera
- Don Shaw
- Steve Shea
- Tommie Sisk
- Dick Smith
- Joe Sparma
- Stan Swanson
- Mike Torrez
- Freddie Velázquez
- Mike Wegener
- Fred Whitfield
- Jimy Williams
- Ron Woods (Note: List may include players who were with the team in Buffalo in 1970.)
