= Gary Sutherland =

American baseball player (1944–2024)

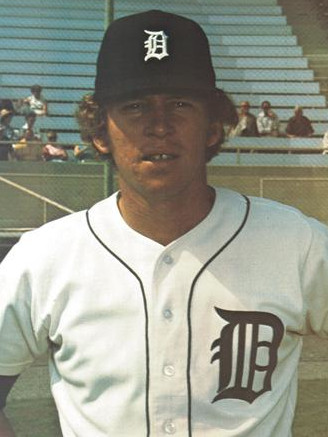
- Second baseman
- Born: September 27, 1944; Glendale, California, U.S.
- Died: December 16, 2024 (aged 80); Monrovia, California, U.S.
- Batted: Right Threw: Right

MLB debut
- September 17, 1967, for the Philadelphia Phillies

Last MLB appearance
- May 19, 1978, for the St. Louis Cardinals

MLB statistics
- Batting average: .243
- Home runs: 24
- Runs batted in: 239
- Stats at Baseball Reference

Teams
- Philadelphia Phillies (1966–1968); Montreal Expos (1969–1971); Houston Astros (1972–1973); Detroit Tigers (1974–1976); Milwaukee Brewers (1976); San Diego Padres (1977); St. Louis Cardinals (1978)

Gary Lynn Sutherland (September 27, 1944 – December 16, 2024), nicknamed "Sudsy", was an American professional baseball middle infielder. He player 13 seasons in Major League Baseball (MLB) from 1966 to 1978 for the Philadelphia Phillies, Montreal Expos, Houston Astros, Detroit Tigers, Milwaukee Brewers, San Diego Padres, and St. Louis Cardinals. He played college baseball at the University of Southern California.

During Sutherland’s major league career, he played 717 games as a second baseman and 164 games as a shortstop. Sutherland compiled a .243 batting average, but became known for his finesse in turning the double play. Sutherland led all National League (NL) second basemen with 110 double plays turned during the 1969 season. In 1969, he also scored the first run in franchise history for the Montreal Expos and recorded the first putout in a regular season MLB game ever played in Canada. Sutherland's career included stints with the Philadelphia Phillies (1966–68), Montreal Expos (1969–71), Houston Astros (1972–73), Detroit Tigers (1974–76), Milwaukee Brewers (1976), San Diego Padres (1977), and St. Louis Cardinals (1978).

== Early life ==
Sutherland was born in Glendale, California on September 27, 1944. His father, Ralph Sutherland, was a left-handed pitcher in minor league baseball in the 1930s and 1940s. His older brother, Darrell Sutherland, was a right-handed pitcher for the New York Mets from 1964 to 1966.

Sutherland attended Glendale High School and the University of Southern California. He played college baseball and was selected as an All-American while playing for the USC Trojans baseball team under head coach Rod Dedeaux. Sutherland represented the United States in baseball at the 1964 Summer Olympics as a demonstration sport in Tokyo.

== Professional baseball ==
=== Minor leagues ===
In November 1964, after completing his sophomore year at the University of Southern California, Sutherland was signed by the Philadelphia Phillies to a bonus contract as an amateur free agent. He began his professional baseball career in 1965 at age 20 with the Chattanooga Lookouts in the Southern League. He appeared in 141 games for Chattanooga in 1965, compiling a .285 batting average, and was promoted in 1966 to the San Diego Padres, then of the Pacific Coast League, in 1966. He appeared in 140 games for the Padres and compiled a .254 batting average.

=== Philadelphia Phillies ===
Sutherland made his major league debut with the Phillies on September 17, 1966, at age 21. He appeared in three games for the Phillies at the end of the 1966 season and had no hits in three at bats.

Sutherland began the 1967 season as a left fielder, appearing in 25 games at the position. In the early weeks of his rookie season, Sutherland performed well at the plate, compiling 11 hits in 19 at bats during one stretch in May 1967. On April 30, 1967, he had a pinch-hit double in the ninth inning to drive in the game-winning runs against the Atlanta Braves. By late May 1967, he led the Phillies with a .407 batting average. Sutherland remained with the Phillies throughout the 1967 season, but moved to shortstop, playing 66 games at the position as a substitute for the Phillies' regular shortstop, Bobby Wine. Sutherland's compiled a .247 batting average in 231 at bats during his rookie season.

After the 1967 season, the Phillies sent Sutherland to the Florida Instructional League in an effort to convert him into a catcher. In December 1967, The Sporting News described the strategy in shifting Sutherland to catcher: "Sutherland isn't a capable enough gloveman to handle the shortstop job on a big league club on a regular basis and he isn't enough of a slugger to become a full-time outfielder, but he does everything fairly well and could well enjoy a long tenure with the Phillies as a utilityman."

In 1968, Sutherland appeared in 17 games at second base, 10 at shortstop, 10 at third base, five in right field and two in left field. He did not appear in any games at the catcher position. After receiving regular playing time at second base at the end of the 1968 season, following an injury to Cookie Rojas, Sutherland had 12 hits in 17 at bats over five games to raise his batting average from .224 to .290. He also compiled five game-winning hits in his 138 at bats in 1968.

=== Montreal Expos ===
In October 1968, Sutherland was drafted by the Montreal Expos as the eighth pick in the 1968 expansion draft. In the Expos' inaugural season, Sutherland became the team's starting second baseman, appearing in 139 games at the position, while compiling a .239 batting average. On April 8, 1969, Sutherland scored the first run in the Expos' franchise history, on a Bob Bailey double in the first inning of the Expos' inaugural game, an 11–10 victory over the New York Mets at Shea Stadium. He also recorded the first putout in a major league regular season game in Canada on April 14, 1969, off Lou Brock's line drive in the Expos' first home game against the St. Louis Cardinals at Jarry Park.

Sutherland continued as the Expos' starting second baseman in 1970, appearing in 97 games at the position while his batting average dropped to .207. Despite the decline in batting average, manager Gene Mauch continued to express confidence in Sutherland. The Sporting News in October 1970 wrote that Sutherland showed "no signs of giving up despite two frustrating seasons," and the paper noted that he turned double plays "with great finesse" and was "one of the toughest men in the National League to strike out," but "his soft liners usually drop comfortably in an outfielder's hands."

In 1971, Ron Hunt took over as the Expos' starting second baseman with Sutherland splitting his time between second base (56 games) and shortstop (46 games).

=== Houston Astros ===
Sutherland spent most of the 1972 season playing in the minor leagues for the Oklahoma City 89ers (79 games) and the Peninsula Whips (53 games). In June 1972, Sutherland was traded by the Expos to the Houston Astros, but he appeared in only five games for the Astros during the 1972 season. In 1973, with Tommy Helms remaining the Astros' starting second baseman, Sutherland appeared in only 16 games for Houston. He again spent most of the 1973 season in the minor leagues, appearing in 134 games for the Denver Bears of the American Association.

=== Detroit Tigers ===
He was dealt along with Jim Ray from the Astros to the Tigers for Fred Scherman at the Winter Meetings on December 3, 1973. At the time of the trade, Detroit scout Jack Tighe opined, "Sutherland makes the double play as good as anyone who ever played. And that includes Bill Mazeroski and Frankie Frisch and all the rest."

Sutherland became the Tigers' starting second baseman in 1974 and began the season with a renewed strength at the plate, batting .417 early in the season. Sutherland finished the 1974 season with a .254 batting average and recorded career highs with 149 games played, 337 putouts, 652 plate appearances, 619 at bats, 157 hits, and 49 RBIs. He ranked third in the American League in at bats and led the Tigers in hits. He also led the American League with 489 outs in 1974. Sutherland credited his defensive improvement in 1974 to having played every day in the minors for the previous two years: "Fielding in the minor leagues is just like fielding in the majors. You still have to catch the ball and throw it."

Sutherland remained the Tigers' starting second baseman in 1975, appearing in 128 games at second base and ranking second in the American League with 21 errors at the position. He compiled a .258 batting average in 1975. During the 1975 season, Sutherland began experiencing dizziness, and doctors suspected that he may suffer from borderline diabetes. Midway through the season, he began an unusual diet in which he was required to eat peanut butter, soda crackers, and raisins three times a day.

=== 1976 to 1978 seasons ===
Between April 1976 and May 1978, Sutherland played for four major league clubs. He began the 1976 season with the Tigers, appearing in 42 games at second base. In June 1976, he was traded by the Tigers to the Milwaukee Brewers for Pedro García. Sutherland appeared in 45 games at second base for the Brewers, compiling a .217 batting average. He was released by the Brewers in February 1977.

In April 1977, Sutherland signed as a free agent with the San Diego Padres, appearing in 30 games at second base and 21 games at third base. He compiled a .243 batting average and was released by the Padres in December 1977.

In January 1978, Sutherland was signed by the St. Louis Cardinals as a free agent. He appeared in only 10 games for the Cardinals and compiled a .167 batting average in six at bats. He appeared in his final major league game on May 19, 1978, and was released by the Cardinals on May 26, 1978.

=== Career totals ===
In 13 major league seasons, Sutherland played in 1,031 games, compiled a .243 batting average, .291 on-base percentage, 239 RBIs, and 754 hits (including 109 doubles, 10 triples, and 24 home runs), scored 308 runs, and drew 207 bases on balls.

== Later life and death ==
After retiring as a player, Sutherland continued to remain involved in professional baseball as a scout and administrator. From 1999 to 2011, he served as special assistant to the general manager of the Los Angeles Angels. Sutherland was responsible for coordinating the Angels' scouting organization.

Sutherland died in Monrovia, California, on December 16, 2024, at the age of 80.
