= Mack Jones =

American baseball player (1938–2004)

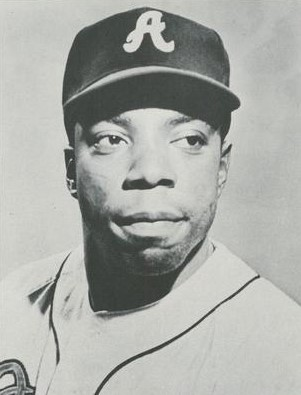
- Outfielder
- Born: November 6, 1938; Atlanta, Georgia, U.S.
- Died: June 8, 2004 (aged 65); Atlanta, Georgia, U.S.
- Batted: Left Threw: Right

MLB debut
- July 13, 1961, for the Milwaukee Braves

Last MLB appearance
- July 1, 1971, for the Montreal Expos

MLB statistics
- Batting average: .252
- Home runs: 133
- Runs batted in: 415
- Stats at Baseball Reference

Teams
- Milwaukee / Atlanta Braves (1961–1967); Cincinnati Reds (1968); Montreal Expos (1969–1971)

Mack Fletcher Jones (November 6, 1938 – June 8, 2004), nicknamed "Mack The Knife", was an American Major League Baseball left fielder who played for the Milwaukee / Atlanta Braves (1961–1967), Cincinnati Reds (1968), and Montreal Expos (1969–1971). He batted left-handed, threw right-handed and was listed as 6 feet 1 inch (1.85 m) tall and 180 pounds (82 kg).

== Professional career ==
A native of Atlanta, Jones was a graduate of Henry McNeal Turner High School. After playing baseball for an Atlanta semi-pro team, Jones was signed by the Milwaukee Braves as an amateur agent in 1958. In his major-league debut, on July 13, 1961, Jones tied a "modern" (post-1900) National League record by collecting four hits (three singles and a double) in his first game, a 6-4 Braves road win over the St. Louis Cardinals and future Baseball Hall of Famer Bob Gibson. Leading off the game, Jones' first career hit was a single off Gibson. An inning later he notched his first career run batted in with a double off Gibson that scored Joe Torre.

In 1964, the Braves loaned Jones to the Detroit Tigers' Triple-A affiliate, the Syracuse Chiefs of the International League. Jones responded with one of the best seasons ever by a Syracuse player, when batting .317 with 15 doubles, 18 triples, 39 home runs and 102 runs batted in. He holds modern-day single-season Syracuse records for runs (111), total bases (337), RBIs, triples and home runs, all set in 1964. Jones was part of a Syracuse outfield that season that included future Tiger stars Willie Horton and Jim Northrup.

Jones returned to the majors the next year, and had his most productive season in 1965, when he batted .262 with 31 home runs and 75 runs batted in. Jones teamed up that year with Hank Aaron, Eddie Mathews, Joe Torre, Felipe Alou, and Gene Oliver, as the Braves set a National League record with six 20-home run hitters in one season. When the Braves moved to Jones' native Atlanta in 1966, he hit 23 homers despite a shoulder injury.

After the 1967 season, he was traded to the Cincinnati Reds along with two other players for Deron Johnson. He played only one season for the Reds, appearing in 103 games in 1968, and his numbers fell off significantly from his past several seasons performance.

In the 1968 MLB expansion draft, Jones was the second player selected by the Montreal Expos (the fourth pick overall), behind Manny Mota. He made his Expos debut on opening day, April 8, 1969, at Shea Stadium in a game against the Mets. Six days later, on April 14, 1969, Jones hit a three-run home run and two-run triple in the Expos' first home victory as a franchise, an 8–7 win over the St. Louis Cardinals at Jarry Park. The home run came with Staub and Don Bosch on base and was the very first to be hit in a Major League regular season game in Canada. Jones finished that season with a career-high .270 batting average, 22 homers and 79 runs batted in. So popular was Jones in Montreal that the left-field bleachers in Jarry Park were nicknamed "Jonesville." After the 1971 season, in which he only appeared in 43 games, he was released by the Expos.

Over his 11-year major-league career, Jones was a .252 hitter with 778 hits, 133 home runs, 415 RBI, 485 runs, 132 doubles, 31 triples, and 65 stolen bases in 1,002 games.

Jones was inducted into the Syracuse Baseball Wall of Fame in 2000, and into the International League Hall of Fame in 2013.

== Personal life ==
Mack Jones died in Atlanta of complications from stomach cancer at age 65. He was survived by his wife Esther Levon Buggs Hill Jones, daughter Gayle Jones, son Rontae Jones, three grandchildren and stepson Antonio Hill.

== In popular culture ==
Jones is portrayed by actor Phillip Jarrett in the French-Canadian baseball film A No-Hit No-Run Summer.
