= Don Shaw (baseball) =

American baseball player (born 1944)

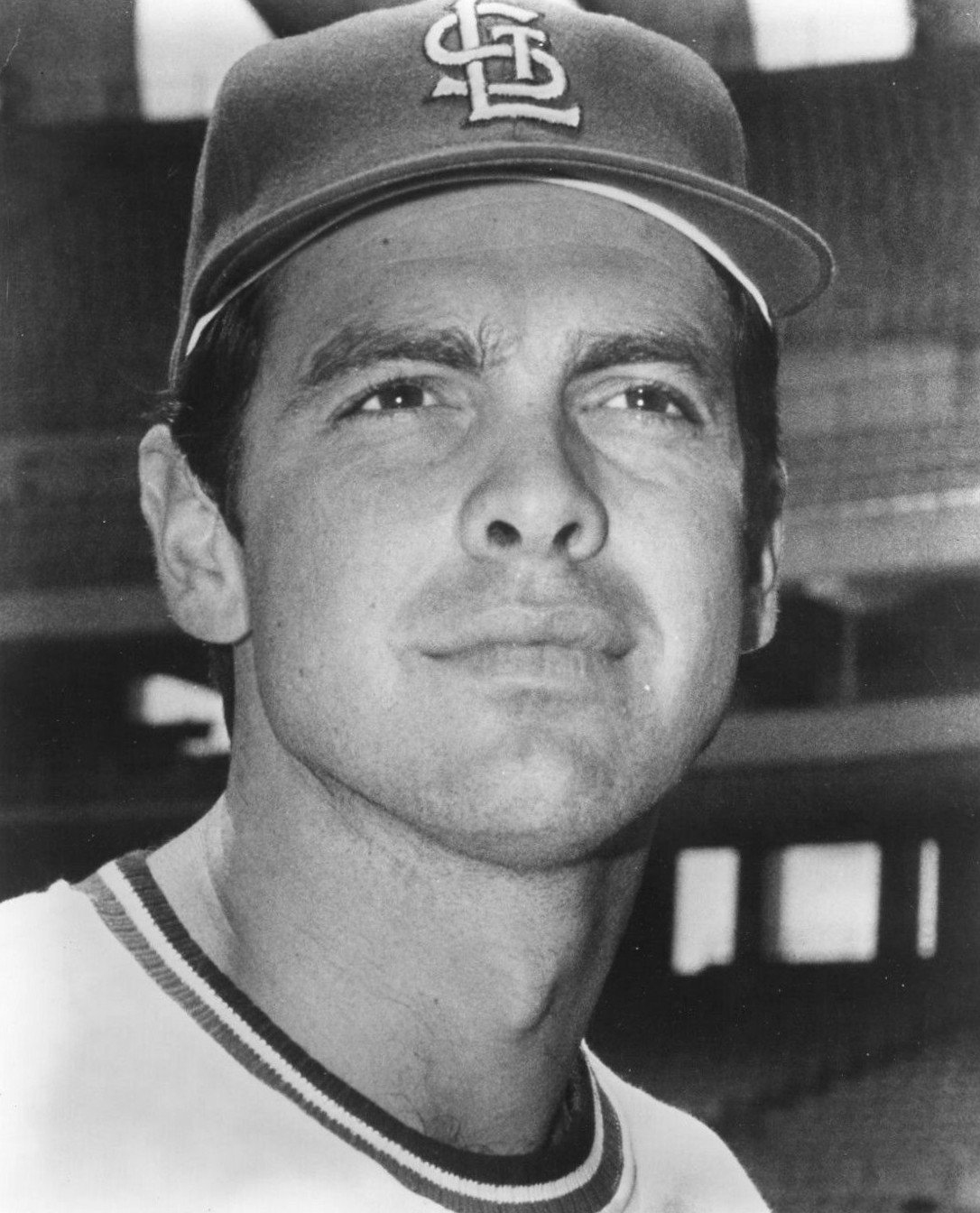
- Shaw, circa 1972
- Pitcher
- Born: February 23, 1944 (age 82); Pittsburgh, Pennsylvania, U.S.
- Batted: Left Threw: Left

MLB debut
- April 11, 1967, for the New York Mets

Last MLB appearance
- May 19, 1972, for the Oakland Athletics

MLB statistics
- Win–loss record: 13–14
- Earned run average: 4.01
- Strikeouts: 123
- Stats at Baseball Reference

Teams
- New York Mets (1967–1968); Montreal Expos (1969); St. Louis Cardinals (1971–1972); Oakland Athletics (1972)

Donald Wellington Shaw (born February 23, 1944) is an American former professional baseball pitcher who appeared in 138 games over all or parts of five seasons in Major League Baseball (MLB) between 1967 and 1972 for the New York Mets, Montreal Expos, St. Louis Cardinals and Oakland Athletics. He was the winning pitcher in the Expos' first-ever game in franchise history against the Mets at Shea Stadium in New York City in April 1969.

== Early career ==
A left hander listed as 6 feet (1.8 m) tall and 180 pounds (82 kg), Shaw was born in Pittsburgh but graduated from Grover Cleveland High School in Reseda, California, in Los Angeles' San Fernando Valley. He attended San Diego State University on a baseball scholarship and was selected by the Mets in the 35th round in the 1965 Major League Baseball draft. After two seasons in New York's farm system, Shaw made the 1967 Mets' roster out of spring training and spent his entire rookie campaign with them, working in 40 games, all in relief, and posting a 4–5 record and three saves, with a 2.98 earned run average.

== Won Expos' first-ever game ==
Shaw spent most of 1968 with Triple-A Jacksonville. The Mets exposed him to the expansion draft, and Montreal chose him with their 21st selection, 40th overall.

After making the Expos' maiden roster, he entered the first National League game in their history on Opening Day, April 8, 1969, in the sixth inning with the score tied, 6–6. He hurled three hitless innings, walking two, as Montreal surged in front, 11–6, aided by home runs from Rusty Staub and Coco Laboy. Shaw struggled in the ninth inning, allowing a walk and three hits, including a three-run, pinch-hit home run by Duffy Dyer, but he departed with Montreal still ahead 11–10. Carroll Sembera, who relieved him, put the tying and winning runs on base before nailing down the save. With Shaw making 35 appearances, the 1969 Expos would go on to lose 110 games in 1969 and finish last in their division; the "Miracle Mets" would stun baseball by winning the National League pennant and 1969 World Series.

== 1971 campaign ==
Shaw started the 1970 season in Triple-A, and his contract was sold to the Cardinals in mid-May; he got into only 14 games all year due to a broken hand and didn't return to MLB until April 1971, when he was recalled from Tulsa and added to the St. Louis bullpen corps. Shaw responded with ten consecutive scoreless relief appearances, not allowing a run between April 29 and June 2, and picking up two wins and a save. Shaw finished 1971 with a 2.65 earned run average and a 7–2 won–lost mark.

However, a sore shoulder hampered him in 1972; he worked in only three full innings in eight early-season games before the Cardinals sold his contract to the Oakland Athletics. After making three appearances, Oakland sent him to Triple-A Iowa. He played in the high minors through 1973 and then retired from professional baseball.

In his 138 MLB games, Shaw compiled a 13–14 record and a career 4.01 earned run average, with six career saves. He made one career start. In 1881/3 innings pitched, he allowed 166 hits and struck out 123 batters. But he also allowed 101 bases on balls.
