= Steve Shea =

American baseball player

- Relief pitcher
- Born: December 5, 1942; Worcester, Massachusetts, U.S.
- Died: March 4, 2015 (aged 72); North Hampton, New Hampshire, U.S.
- Batted: Right Threw: Right

MLB debut
- July 14, 1968, for the Houston Astros

Last MLB appearance
- May 31, 1969, for the Montreal Expos

MLB statistics
- Win–loss record: 4–4
- Earned run average: 3.22
- Innings: 50 1/3
- Stats at Baseball Reference

Teams
- Houston Astros (1968); Montreal Expos (1969)

Steven Francis Shea (December 5, 1942 – March 4, 2015) was an American relief pitcher in Major League Baseball who played from 1968 to 1969 for the Houston Astros and Montreal Expos. Listed at 6 feet 3 inches (1.91 m), 215 pounds (98 kg), he batted and threw right handed.

Born in Worcester, Massachusetts, Shea grew up in Bedford, Massachusetts. He attended the University of Massachusetts in Amherst.

Shea was signed by the Chicago Cubs as a free agent in 1961, playing in their Minor League system from 1962 through 1964.

Following his release, he signed with Houston in 1965 and pitched three solid seasons in the minors before joining the Astros in 1968. He gained credit for the victory in his first Major League appearance, pitching 1 1/3 perfect innings against the Cincinnati Reds in a 5–4, 10-inning game.

After that, Shea was sold to the expansion Expos on the eve of their maiden 1969 season. He worked in the Expos' second-ever contest, a 9–5 loss to the New York Mets, pitching 2/3 of shutout ball, but did not factor into the decision. Shea finished with a good 2.87 ERA and did not have a decision in ten relief appearances. He was sent to the Triple-A Vancouver Mounties in the midseason and finished his professional career as a pitcher/manager for the Triple-A Winnipeg Whips in 1971.

Overall, Shea posted a 4–4 record with a 3.22 ERA and six saves in 40 pitching appearances for Houston and Montreal, striking out 26 batters while walking 19 in 50 1/3 innings of work. He went 34–42 with a 3.95 ERA in nine Minor League seasons spanning 1962–1971.

In between, Shea played winter ball for the Leones del Caracas club of the Venezuelan League in the 1969–1970 season.

Besides baseball, Shea earned an MBA at Boston College and worked in executive banking for more than 20 years before retiring as president and chief executive officer of Rockingham Bank Corp in 1997. The next year, he joined the Central Asian-American Enterprise Fund and began his mission to help to transform the lives of individuals and their countries.

In addition, Shea was a creator of the Central Asia-American Education Foundation and served as president and board member for the rest of his life. Through his efforts, hundreds of students from Central Asia received a business or economics education and many more will in the future.

Shea died in 2015 in North Hampton, New Hampshire, at the age of 72.
