= Paul Popovich =

American baseball player (born 1940)

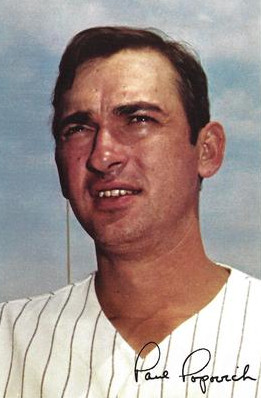
- Popovich in 1969
- Second baseman
- Born: August 18, 1940 (age 85); Flemington, West Virginia, U.S.
- Batted: Switch Threw: Right

MLB debut
- April 19, 1964, for the Chicago Cubs

Last MLB appearance
- July 21, 1975, for the Pittsburgh Pirates

MLB statistics
- Batting average: .233
- Home runs: 14
- Runs batted in: 134
- Stats at Baseball Reference

Teams
- Chicago Cubs (1964, 1966–1967); Los Angeles Dodgers (1968–1969); Chicago Cubs (1969–1973); Pittsburgh Pirates (1974–1975)

Paul Edward Popovich (born August 18, 1940) is an American former professional baseball infielder. He played in Major League Baseball from 1964 through 1975 for the Chicago Cubs, Los Angeles Dodgers, and Pittsburgh Pirates.

== Early years ==
Popovich attended West Virginia University, where he played college baseball and basketball (where he was a teammate of Jerry West) for the Mountaineers in 1959 and 1960. The Flemington, West Virginia native also played independent baseball on the Morgantown, West Virginia American Legion team. He signed as an amateur free agent with the Chicago Cubs for $40,000 in 1960.

The second baseman was a .244 hitter with seven home runs and 86 runs batted in over three seasons in the Cubs' farm system when he had a breakthrough season with the Texas League's Amarillo Gold Sox in 1963. He batted .313 with seventeen home runs and sixty RBIs.

== Chicago Cubs ==
He made his major league debut in the fifth game of the 1964 season, and got a pinch hit single in his only at bat. Nonetheless, he was optioned to the triple A Salt Lake City Bees, and would not return to the majors until a September call up in 1966. In two games, he went 0-for-6.

Following his brief stint with the Cubs in 1966, Popovich spent the winter with the Arizona Instructional League Cubs learning shortstop and third base. This experience earned him a bench role with the Cubs in 1967. In 49 games, Popovich batted .214 with no home runs, two RBIs and eighteen runs scored. Following the season, he and minor leaguer Jim Williams were traded to the Los Angeles Dodgers for outfielder Lou Johnson.

== Los Angeles Dodgers ==
Popovich appeared in 134 games for the Dodgers in 1968, mostly at second base. His first major league home run was a game tying ninth inning blast against the Philadelphia Phillies on June 9. He also had a four hit game against the Houston Astros on May 24. All told, Popovich batted .232 with two home runs and 25 RBIs. Shortly into the 1969 season, the Dodgers traded Popovich and Ron Fairly to the Montreal Expos for Dodgers legend Maury Wills and Manny Mota. The Expos then flipped Popovich back to the Cubs for Jack Lamabe and Adolfo Phillips.

== Chicago Cubs ==
He earned the nickname "Supersub" for his utility work for the Cubs in 1969. He also had a career high .312 batting average, as the Cubs battled the New York Mets for the National League East crown. He remained a supersub for the Cubs through the 1973 season. His best season came in 1971. While he batted a meager .217, he had a career high 28 RBIs, and tied his career high from the previous season with four home runs.

== Pittsburgh Pirates ==
Just as the 1974 season was getting underway, Popovich was traded to the Pittsburgh Pirates for pitcher Tom Dettore. He reached the post season for the only time in his career against his former club, the Los Angeles Dodgers. While the Pirates lost to the Dodgers, three games to one, Popovich had an exceptional series. He went 3-for-5 with a run scored. He was released midway through the 1975 season.

== Career statistics ==
Games	PA	AB	Runs	Hits	2B	3B	HR	RBI	SB	BB	SO	HBP	Avg.	Slg.	Fld%
682	1909	1732	176	403	42	9	14	134	4	127	151	8	.233	.292	.979

The 1969 Dodgers yearbook shows Popovich surrounded by 21 fans who shared his surname.
