= Dan McGinn =

American baseball player (1943–2023)

- Pitcher
- Born: November 29, 1943; Omaha, Nebraska, U.S.
- Died: March 1, 2023 (aged 79); Omaha, Nebraska, U.S.
- Batted: Left Threw: Left

MLB debut
- September 3, 1968, for the Cincinnati Reds

Last MLB appearance
- October 3, 1972, for the Chicago Cubs

MLB statistics
- Win–loss record: 15–30
- Earned run average: 5.11
- Strikeouts: 293
- Stats at Baseball Reference

Teams
- Cincinnati Reds (1968); Montreal Expos (1969–1971); Chicago Cubs (1972)

Daniel Michael McGinn (November 29, 1943 – March 1, 2023) was an American professional baseball player. A left-handed pitcher, McGinn played in Major League Baseball for the Cincinnati Reds, Montreal Expos and Chicago Cubs from 1968 to 1972.

== Early life and football ==
Born in Omaha, Nebraska, the 6 ft (1.8 m), 185 lb (84 kg) McGinn was a multi-sport athlete at Omaha Cathedral High School, excelling in football, baseball and basketball. In 1962, he quarterbacked the football team and later won the MVP award at the Nebraska high school all-star game. McGinn signed a letter of intent to play for the University of Nebraska under legendary coach Bob Devaney, but instead decided to attend the University of Notre Dame. His playing time at quarterback was limited, however, because he played behind John Huarte, who won the Heisman Trophy in 1964; during his time with the Fighting Irish, McGinn also spent time at punter, split end, running back, and defensive back.

McGinn also played baseball at Notre Dame, striking out 105 batters in 74 innings his junior year in 1965—as of 2019, still a school record for most strikeouts per nine innings (12.66). The St. Louis Cardinals picked him in the first-ever amateur draft, but McGinn chose to stay in school, getting his bachelor's degree in communication arts. In 1966, the Cincinnati Reds took him in the first round (10th overall pick) of the secondary phase of the January draft, and he reported to Knoxville of the Double-A Southern League.

== Baseball career ==
After struggling his first two years as a starting pitcher in the minors, McGinn found his stride as a reliever in 1968. “Sparky Anderson [was] my manager and at the beginning of the year he said to me that Cincinnati is loaded with left-handed starters, but they need a left-handed reliever, so let’s make you a reliever,” he recalled. After appearing in 74 games, posting six wins and a 2.29 earned run average, McGinn was called up to the big club on September 3, 1968. He debuted as a pinch runner, then came in to pitch against the eventual champion Cardinals; he walked two batters and was tagged with the loss. McGinn got into 14 games with the Reds that year, going 0–1 with a 5.25 ERA.

The Reds left McGinn unprotected in the expansion draft so the Montreal Expos selected him with their 14th pick. McGinn made history in two opening day games in 1969. On April 8, he would become the first relief pitcher in Expos history, as he came in for Mudcat Grant in the second inning in Montreal's first ever game, in Shea Stadium against the New York Mets. In the fourth inning, McGinn hit the first home run in Expos history, off Mets starter Tom Seaver (the only home run of his big league career). Six days later, on April 14, he earned the first MLB win in Canada with 5 1/3 innings of shutout relief as Montreal defeated the St. Louis Cardinals 8–7 at Jarry Park. On June 6 in a game against the Dodgers in Los Angeles, McGinn beaned Willie Davis in the right cheek. Remarkably, Davis only missed 9 games and subsequently wore a helmet with an earflap the rest of his career. McGinn would appear in 74 games in 1969, compiling a 7–10 record with a 3.94 ERA and six saves for an Expos club that went 52–110.

McGinn was 7–10 again in 1970, but his ERA jumped to 5.44; he also threw in winter ball and in the instructional league, which resulted in a tired arm. After a disappointing spring training in 1971, McGinn started the season at Triple-A Winnipeg; he returned to Montreal, but was not effective, going 1–4 with a 5.96 ERA. Prior to the 1972 season, the Expos traded McGinn to the Chicago Cubs, where he could only manage a 0–5 mark with a 5.89 ERA. It was McGinn's last year in the big leagues; he would spend the 1973 season with Wichita and Tulsa in Triple-A, with a 3–6 record and a 5.40 ERA.

Altogether, McGinn appeared in a total of 210 games (28 starts) during his five MLB seasons, with 15 wins, 30 losses, 10 saves, and an earned run average of 5.11.

== Death ==
McGinn died on March 1, 2023, at the age of 79.

== See also ==
- Montreal Expos all-time roster
