= Leo Marentette =

American baseball player (1941–2014)

- Pitcher
- Born: February 18, 1941; Detroit, Michigan, U.S.
- Died: May 8, 2014 (aged 73); Lambertville, Michigan, U.S.
- Batted: Right Threw: Right

MLB debut
- September 26, 1965, for the Detroit Tigers

Last MLB appearance
- June 15, 1969, for the Montreal Expos

MLB statistics
- Win–loss record: 0–0
- Earned run average: 4.32
- Innings: 8⅓

Teams
- Detroit Tigers (1965); Montreal Expos (1969)

Leo John Marentette Jr. (February 18, 1941 – May 8, 2014) was an American professional baseball player and relief pitcher in the Major Leagues who played for the Detroit Tigers (1965) and the Montreal Expos (1969). Listed at 6 feet 2 inches (1.88 metres), 200 pounds (91 kilograms), Marentette batted and threw right-handed.

In a two-season career, Marentette posted a 4.32 ERA in five pitching appearances, giving up four runs on 10 hits and two walks while striking out one in 8 1/3 innings of work. He did not have a decision or save. He pitched three scoreless innings for the Tigers in September 1965. Then, in 1969, Marentette was recalled from Triple-A to pitch for the Expos during the expansion team's maiden season. He appeared in three games during the Expos' June California road trip, one against each of the three teams based there, and gave up four earned runs in 5 1/3 innings. He left baseball after the 1970 season. He won 74 games during an 11-season minor league career.

On May 8, 2014, Marentette died of a heart attack at the age of 73 at his home in Lambertville, Michigan.
