= Jim Fairey =

American baseball player (born 1944)

- Outfielder
- Born: September 22, 1944 (age 80); Orangeburg, South Carolina, U.S.
- Batted: Left Threw: Left

MLB debut
- April 14, 1968, for the Los Angeles Dodgers

Last MLB appearance
- September 26, 1973, for the Los Angeles Dodgers

MLB statistics
- Batting average: .235
- Home runs: 7
- Runs batted in: 75
- Stats at Baseball Reference

Teams
- Los Angeles Dodgers (1968); Montreal Expos (1969–1972); Los Angeles Dodgers (1973)

James Burke Fairey (born September 22, 1944) is a former outfielder in Major League Baseball. He played from 1968 to 1973 for the Los Angeles Dodgers and Montreal Expos.
