= Manny Mota =

Dominican baseball player (born 1938)

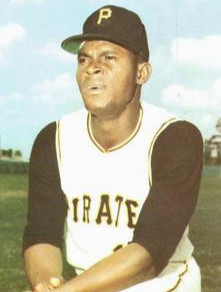
- Mota in 1966
- Outfielder
- Born: February 18, 1938 (age 88); Santo Domingo, Dominican Republic
- Batted: Right Threw: Right

MLB debut
- April 16, 1962, for the San Francisco Giants

Last MLB appearance
- September 1, 1982, for the Los Angeles Dodgers

MLB statistics
- Batting average: .304
- Home runs: 31
- Runs batted in: 438
- Stats at Baseball Reference

Teams
- As player: San Francisco Giants (1962); Pittsburgh Pirates (1963–1968); Montreal Expos (1969); Los Angeles Dodgers (1969–1980, 1982); As coach: Los Angeles Dodgers (1980–2013)

Career highlights and awards
- All-Star (1973); 2× World Series champion (1981, 1988); Legend of Dodger Baseball

Member of the Caribbean

Baseball Hall of Fame
- Induction: 1998

Manuel Rafael Mota Geronimo, more commonly known as Manny Mota (born February 18, 1938), is a Dominican former Major League Baseball outfielder who played 20 seasons for the San Francisco Giants, Pittsburgh Pirates and Montreal Expos, as well as being a pinch hitting specialist with the Los Angeles Dodgers. He retired as a player at the age of 44.

He served as a coach for the Dodgers from 1980 through 2013. His 34 consecutive seasons as a Dodger coach set a team record and is the second-longest such streak in MLB history, following Nick Altrock, who coached for 42 consecutive seasons with the Washington Senators. Mota currently works as a minor league hitting instructor and serves as a Spanish-language television broadcaster for the Dodgers.

== Playing career ==
=== San Francisco Giants ===
==== Minor leagues ====
At the age of 19, Mota signed as an amateur free agent with the New York Giants on February 21, 1957. He began his minor league career that season with the Class-D Michigan City White Caps of the Midwest League, where he hit .314 in 126 games. In 1958, he was promoted to the Class-B Danville Leafs of the Carolina League, where he hit .301 in 103 games.

Mota began 1959 with the Class A Springfield Giants of the Eastern League and was later promoted to the AAA Phoenix Giants of the Pacific Coast League. In 86 games combined, he hit .304. In 1960, he played in 141 games for the AA Rio Grande Valley Giants of the Texas League, hitting .307. In 1961, with the AAA Tacoma Giants, he hit .289 in 142 games.

==== Major leagues ====
After beginning 1962 with the El Paso Sun Kings, Mota made his major league debut on April 16, 1962, for the San Francisco Giants against the Los Angeles Dodgers, and hit a fly ball to centerfield in his first at-bat. His first hit was a single off Jim Brosnan of the Cincinnati Reds on April 21, 1962. He had 13 hits in 74 at-bats for a .176 batting average in 47 games for the Giants.

On November 30, 1962, the Giants traded Mota to the Houston Colt .45's (with Dick LeMay) for infielder Joey Amalfitano.

=== Pittsburgh Pirates ===
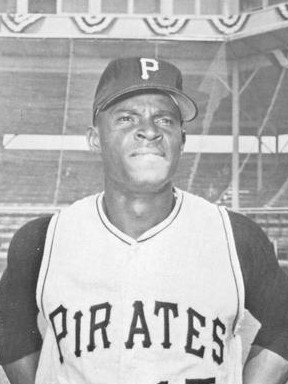
Mota as a member of the Pittsburgh Pirates in 1965.

Before he appeared in an official game with Houston, Mota was dealt to the Pittsburgh Pirates for outfielder Howie Goss and cash on April 4, 1963, and he quickly established himself as one of the National League's premiere hitters. In six years with the Pirates, Mota appeared in 642 games and hit .297. His first career home run was hit off Chris Short of the Philadelphia Phillies on May 26, 1964.

=== Montreal Expos ===
On October 14, 1968, Mota was the second player selected in the expansion draft by the Montreal Expos. In 31 games, he hit .315.

=== Los Angeles Dodgers ===
On June 11, 1969, Mota was traded to the Los Angeles Dodgers (along with Maury Wills) for Ron Fairly and Paul Popovich. Once in L.A., Mota became their number one pinch hitter and hit over .300 during the next five seasons.

On May 16, 1970, Mota hit the first batted ball in major league history to cause a fatality. In the bottom of the third against the Giants at Dodger Stadium, Mota fouled one off of Gaylord Perry along the first base line. The ball struck 14-year-old Alan Fish in the left temple. Four days later, Fish died of an inoperable head injury.

In 1973, Mota was selected to the National League All-Star team after leading the league in batting average. From 1974 through 1979, Mota was continuously called upon for late inning heroics, where he averaged 10 pinch hits for six straight seasons. The Dodgers appeared in the 1974, 1977, and 1978 World Series. In 1979, he established his place in the record books by becoming the all-time leader in pinch hits. He had a compact swing and often half-swung just to push the ball beyond the reach of the first baseman for a hit.

In 1981, Mota appeared in his fourth World Series, this time as a coach. Mota retired as a player from the Dodgers after the 1982 season, a year in which he had only one plate appearance. He ended his playing career holding the all-time major league record for career pinch-hits (149), which has since been broken by Mark Sweeney and Lenny Harris, an overall lifetime batting average of .304, and a .299 pinch-hitting average (149-499) along with four home runs and 115 RBI in that role. His .315 batting average is second best (1,800 or more at bats) in Los Angeles Dodgers history, trailing only Mike Piazza's .331.

== Post-playing career ==
Mota served as a player-coach for the Dodgers during his final seasons on the diamond, then remained a coach after retiring as a player. Mota coached Los Angeles in the 1988 World Series, his fifth in a Dodger uniform. He retired as a coach in 2013 to become a full-time broadcaster (see below).

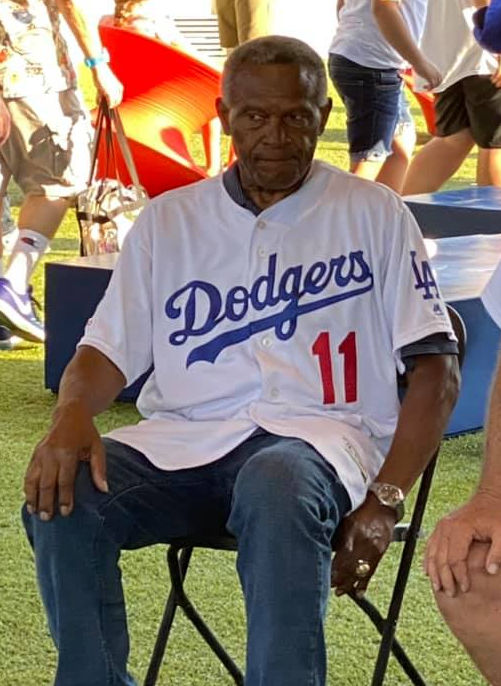
Manny Mota at a Dodger game in 2021

Mota's fame as a pinch-hitter was immortalized in the 1980 movie Airplane!, when Ted Stryker tries to "concentrate!" on flying the plane, then hears an echo in his head ("concentrate...!"), which morphs into a baseball public address announcer intoning, "Pinch-hitting for Pedro Borbon...(Borbon)...Manny...(Manny)...Mota...(Mota)...!" (This did not occur in a real big-league game, as Mota and Borbon never played for the same major league team at the same time; however, they did play together for Tigres del Licey in the Dominican Republic for several winter seasons.)

In the off-season, Mota and his wife Margarita resided in the Dominican Republic, where they ran the Manny Mota International Foundation. Established over 30 years ago, this humanitarian organization provided vital resources and other assistance to disadvantaged youth and their families in both the Dominican Republic and the United States.

Mota was inducted into the Hispanic Heritage Baseball Museum Hall of Fame on August 23, 2003, in a pre-game on-field ceremony at Dodger Stadium. Mota was inducted into the Baseball Reliquary's Shrine of the Eternals in 2013.

Mota worked as a color commentator on the Fox Sports en Espanol television broadcast of the 2007 World Series and worked as a Spanish-language broadcaster for the Dodgers on select PrimeTicket broadcasts; he became a full-time broadcaster on the Spanish-language feeds of SportsNet LA in 2014.

== Family ==
Two of Mota's sons, Andy and José, also played in the major leagues. Manny's youngest son, Tony, played extensively through the minor leagues and also coached for the Dodgers organization. His son Jose was a Spanish language play by play broadcaster for the Los Angeles Angels for 20 years. He joined the Los Angeles Dodgers Spanish language broadcast team in 2022. Manny was married to Margarita Mota for 60 years. She died in September 2023. Mota's nephew, Santiago Taveras, is an educator and former deputy chancellor in New York City, and was the principal of DeWitt Clinton High School in the Bronx until his ouster in a grade-fixing scandal in November 2016.

== Notes ==
Preceded by Jim Lefebvre	Los Angeles Dodgers Hitting Coach; 1980–1989	Succeeded by Ben Hines
