= Ron Fairly =

American baseball player (1938–2019)

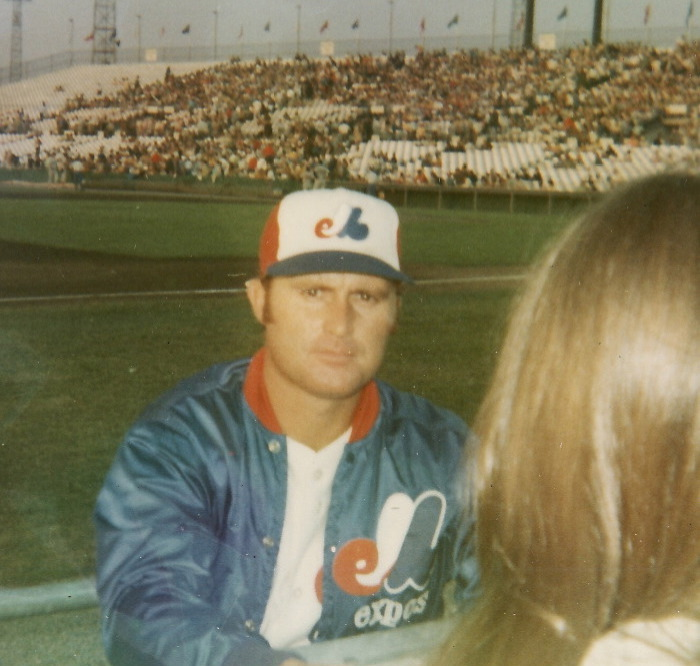
- Fairly with Expos at Jarry Park Stadium in 1969
- First baseman / Right fielder
- Born: July 12, 1938; Macon, Georgia, U.S.
- Died: October 30, 2019 (aged 81); Indian Wells, California, U.S.
- Batted: Left Threw: Left

MLB debut
- September 9, 1958, for the Los Angeles Dodgers

Last MLB appearance
- September 23, 1978, for the California Angels

MLB statistics
- Batting average: .266
- Home runs: 215
- Runs batted in: 1,044
- Stats at Baseball Reference

Teams
- Los Angeles Dodgers (1958–1969); Montreal Expos (1969–1974); St. Louis Cardinals (1975–1976); Oakland Athletics (1976); Toronto Blue Jays (1977); California Angels (1978)

Career highlights and awards
- 2× All-Star (1973, 1977); 3× World Series champion (1959, 1963, 1965)

Ronald Ray Fairly (July 12, 1938 – October 30, 2019) was an American professional baseball player and television sports presenter. He played in Major League Baseball as a first baseman and right fielder from 1958 to 1978, most prominently as a member of the Los Angeles Dodgers, with whom he was a member of three World Series winning teams. Fairly was also a two-time All-Star.

After his playing career, he began a career as a television color commentator from 1979 to 2006 for the California Angels, San Francisco Giants and the Seattle Mariners. Combining his playing and broadcasting careers, Fairly was involved in over 7,000 major league games from 1958 through 2006.

== Early life and college career ==
Fairly was born in Macon, Georgia, although when he was three months old his family moved to Long Beach, California, where he grew up and attended Jordan High School. Fairly played one season college baseball for USC Trojans baseball team in 1958, coached by Rod Dedeaux. He hit .348 with team highs of nine home runs and 67 RBI as a sophomore center fielder as the Trojans won USC's second College World Series championship. There he was a teammate of future Major League Baseball general manager Pat Gillick. An All-District 8 selection that season, Fairly was signed by the Los Angeles Dodgers as an amateur free agent. After two brief minor league stops, he made his MLB debut with the big club late in September 1958.

Fairly and four USC teammates played the 1957 season for the Edmonton Eskimos owned by John Ducey. The team won the Western Canada Baseball League championship, the Canadian amateur championship, and placed second to Japan at the 1957 Global Series in Detroit.

== Professional career ==
A competitive player and highly disciplined hitter, Fairly had a short and compact swing with occasional power to all fields. With his glove, he was a competent first baseman as well as at all three outfield positions, being best suited for right field. His talents were overshadowed by his notorious lack of speed. He was second in Major League Baseball (MLB) history, following Stan Musial, to play 1,000 games or more in both the outfield and the infield. Fairly played 21 seasons of (MLB), 12 of them with the Los Angeles Dodgers, where he won three World Series titles. In 2,442 career games, Fairly had 1,913 hits, a .266 batting average with 215 home runs and 1,044 RBI, while walking 1,052 times compared to only 877 strikeouts. He posted a career .990 fielding percentage.

Fairly played in four World Series, appearing in 20 games, hitting .300 with 2 home runs and 6 RBI, all with the Los Angeles Dodgers.

His career home run total is the most in Major League Baseball history for a player without a 20-home run season. Of the top 100 players in terms of games played in a career, he is the only one with fewer than 2,000 hits.

=== Los Angeles Dodgers ===
Fairly made his Major League Baseball debut with the Los Angeles Dodgers on September 9, 1958, going hitless in three at-bats in a 4-3 loss to the Philadelphia Phillies. The next day, he collected his first career hit, a single off the Phillies' Robin Roberts. On September 12, Fairly hit his first career home run off Ron Kline of the Pittsburgh Pirates. Overall with the Dodgers, Fairly played in 15 games, hitting .283 with 2 home runs and 8 RBI.

In 1959, Fairly was used mostly as a pinch hitter and a defensive replacement late in games, as in 118 games with Los Angeles, he had only 244 at-bats. During the season, he hit .238 with 4 home runs and 23 RBI, helping Los Angeles win the National League (NL) pennant and advance to the 1959 World Series. Fairly played in all six games during the World Series, going hitless in three at-bats, as the Dodgers won the series over the Chicago White Sox.

Fairly spent the majority of the 1960 season with the Dodgers Triple-A affiliate, the Spokane Indians of the Pacific Coast League, playing in only 14 games with Los Angeles, hitting .108 with a home run and 3 RBI.

In 1961, Fairly played in 111 games with the Dodgers, hitting .322 with 10 home runs and 48 RBI, while spending time between the three outfield positions and first base.

Fairly became the Dodgers' everyday first baseman during the 1962 season, as in 147 games, he hit .278 with 14 home runs and 71 RBI.

Fairly helped the Dodgers clinch the National League pennant in 1963, as he played in 152 games, hitting .271 with 12 home runs and 77 RBI. In the 1963 World Series against the New York Yankees, Fairly played in all four games, however, he was credited with only one at-bat, as he failed to register a hit, but walked three times as Los Angeles won the series.

Fairly had another solid season with the Dodgers in 1964, batting .256 with 10 home runs and 74 RBI in 150 games.

In 1965, Fairly appeared in a career-high 158 games with Los Angeles, hitting .274 with 9 home runs and 70 RBI, helping the club to their third NL pennant since Fairly joined the team. In the 1965 World Series against the Minnesota Twins, Fairly played a key role in the Dodgers' seven-game series victory, as he hit .379 with 2 home runs and 6 RBI, as Los Angeles won their third World Series title in seven years.

Fairly missed a month of the season due to injuries in 1966, playing in only 117 games, his lowest total since 1961, however, he hit .288 with 14 home runs and 61 RBI, helping the Dodgers clinch the NL pennant for the second consecutive season. In the 1966 World Series against the Baltimore Orioles, Fairly hit only .143 with no home runs or RBI in three games, as the Dodgers lost to the Orioles.

In 1967, Fairly struggled offensively, as his batting average dipped to .220, while he had 10 home runs and 55 RBI in 153 games.

Fairly continued his struggles throughout the 1968 season, as he hit only .234 with 4 home runs and 43 RBI in 141 with the Dodgers.

He began the 1969 season with Los Angeles, however, Fairly continued to struggle with his bat, hitting .219 with no home runs and 8 RBI in 30 games with the Dodgers.

=== Montreal Expos ===
On June 11, 1969, the Dodgers traded Fairly and Paul Popovich to the Montreal Expos for Manny Mota and Maury Wills.

After struggling offensively with the Dodgers for the previous two seasons, Fairly immediately improved with his move to the expansion Expos in 1969, batting .289 with 12 home runs and 39 RBI in 70 games.

Fairly had a solid season in 1970, playing in 119 games with the Expos, hitting .288 with 15 home runs and 61 RBI, as well as stealing a career-high 10 bases.

Fairly saw his batting average fall to .257 in the 1971 season, however, his power numbers remained steady, as he hit 13 home runs and 71 RBI in 146 games with Montreal.

He continued his solid play with the Expos in 1972, as Fairly hit .278 with 17 home runs and 68 RBI in 140 games.

Fairly appeared as a defensive replacement in the 1973 MLB All-Star Game, his first All-Star game.

During the 1974 season, Fairly lost some playing time, as he appeared in only 101 games with Montreal, hitting .243 with 12 home runs and 43 RBI. Overall with the Expos, Fairly hit .276 with 86 home runs and 331 RBI in 718 games.

=== St. Louis Cardinals ===
The Expos traded Fairly to the St. Louis Cardinals for a pair of minor leaguers, first baseman Ed Kurpiel and infielder Rudy Kinard, at the Winter Meetings on December 6, 1974.

He spent the 1975 season as a utility player for the Cardinals where in 107 games, he hit .307 with 7 home runs and 37 RBI, as he saw his playing time split between first base and as an outfielder.

He started 1976 with St. Louis, appearing in 73 games, hitting .264 with no home runs and 21 RBI.

=== Oakland Athletics ===
On September 14, 1976, the Oakland Athletics purchased Fairly's contract. He played 15 games to finish the season with Oakland, hitting hit .239 with 3 home runs and 10 RBI, as the Athletics finished in second place in the American League West, ending their division title streak at five.

=== Toronto Blue Jays ===
On February 24, 1977, Oakland traded Fairly to the expansion Toronto Blue Jays for Mike Weathers and cash. Fairly split the 1977 season between designated hitter, first base, and the outfield, as he played in 132 games with Toronto, hitting .279 with a team leading 19 home runs and 64 RBI. He appeared in the All-Star Game, as a pinch hitter, striking out against Tom Seaver. Fairly is the only player to have represented both Canadian MLB teams in the All-Star game, as well as the only player to play for both Canadian teams in their inaugural seasons.

=== California Angels ===
On December 8, 1977, the Blue Jays traded Fairly to the California Angels for Butch Alberts and Pat Kelly. Fairly finished his career with the Angels in 1978, playing in 91 games, hitting .217 with 10 home runs and 40 RBI, announcing his retirement at the end of that season.

== Broadcasting career ==
After his playing career, Fairly began his broadcasting career in 1979 at KTLA in Los Angeles and later joined Bob Starr in the California Angels radio/television booth. During the 1984 season, he also served as the club's hitting instructor for manager John McNamara while continuing to hold down his radio duties. Considered "one of the most knowledgeable baseball men in the organization," he suited up prior to each game to instruct hitters during batting practice before returning to the broadcast booth to do Angels games for KMPC radio. Fairly said of the new assignment, "When you play as long as I did, you're constantly talking hitting. But I don't see this role in the context of instructing as much as reminding guys what they do well. I get to the park early anyway. And there's no conflict really with my radio work." Angels general manager Buzzie Bavasi told the Orange County Register in announcing the decision, "Since we were planning on adding a hitting instructor, the feeling was we had the man right here. Ron is intelligent, articulate and knows the game."

In 1987, Fairly moved north and joined KNBR as the voice of the San Francisco Giants. In 1993, he went farther north as a broadcaster for the Seattle Mariners, where he stayed through the 2006 season. Fairly served primarily as a color commentator but occasionally stepped in to do play-by-play, as well.

In 1997, Fairly was selected to the USC Athletic Hall of Fame.

On September 21, 2006, the Mariners announced Fairly would be retiring after 14 seasons with Seattle, ending a 27-year career in baseball broadcasting. Coupled with 21 years as a player, Fairly spent 48 years in and around the majors.

From June 15 to June 17, 2007, Fairly briefly came out of retirement to work as a television analyst for the Mariners during a three-game interleague series against the Houston Astros, while broadcaster Mike Blowers was on vacation.

From July 15 to July 18, 2010, Fairly broadcast the Mariners' four-game series against the Los Angeles Angels with Rick Rizzs on KIRO to fill in for Dave Niehaus, who was on vacation. In 2011 and 2012, Fairly returned again to the Mariners' radio booth, as one of a rotating group of guest announcers filling in on their broadcasts following the death of Niehaus after the 2010 season.

== Personal life and death ==
Fairly was married and had three children and seven grandchildren. After retiring from broadcasting, he lived in Palm Springs, California.

Fairly died of pancreatic cancer on October 30, 2019, at the age of 81.

== See also ==
- List of Major League Baseball career runs batted in leaders
