= Adolfo Phillips =

Panamanian baseball player (born 1941)

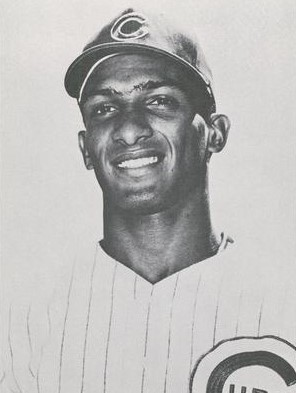
- Center fielder
- Born: December 16, 1941 (age 84); Bethania, Panama
- Batted: Right Threw: Right

MLB debut
- September 2, 1964, for the Philadelphia Phillies

Last MLB appearance
- May 16, 1972, for the Cleveland Indians

MLB statistics
- Batting average: .247
- Home runs: 59
- Runs batted in: 173
- Stats at Baseball Reference

Teams
- Philadelphia Phillies (1964–1966); Chicago Cubs (1966–1969); Montreal Expos (1969–1970); Cleveland Indians (1972)

Adolfo Emilio Phillips López (born December 16, 1941) is a Panamanian former professional baseball outfielder, who played in Major League Baseball (MLB) for the Philadelphia Phillies, Chicago Cubs, Montreal Expos, and Cleveland Indians from 1964 to 1972.

== Early life ==
Phillips was born on December 16, 1941 in Bethania, Panama. Phillips's father was an engineer, and he was raised with three sisters and two brothers. He was signed as an amateur free agent by the Philadelphia Phillies on September 21, 1960.

== Minor league career ==
Phillips began his Minor League Baseball (MiLB) career in 1961 with the Class C Magic Valley Cowboys of the Pioneer League, a Philadelphia Phillies affiliate. The 19-year old Phillips had a .191 batting average in 72 games. During the 1961 season he had trouble hitting the curveball, and pressing to hit home runs. He was placed on the inactive list for one month, before returning to the team and showing signs of improvement in his hitting at the end of the season. He hit a grand slam home run in an August 30 game. One of his Cowboys teammates was future Baseball Hall of Fame third baseman Dick Allen.

He improved dramatically with the Cowboys in 1962, batting .330 with 135 runs scored, 33 home runs, 79 runs batted in (RBI), a 1.119 OPS (on-base plus slugging) and 46 stolen bases. He was first in the Pioneer League in runs and stolen bases, second in home runs and OPS and fourth in batting average. He was named to the Pioneer League All-Star Team in 1962 as an outfielder.

In 1963, he was promoted to the Double-A Chattanooga Lookouts of the South Atlantic (Sally) League. He batted .306, with 90 runs scored, 13 home runs, 41 RBIs and an .897 OPS. Of players with more than 300 at bats, he was first in the Sally League in runs scored, second in OPS, and fifth in batting average. In 1963, he was selected to play for the Sally League All-Stars.

In 1964, the Phillies promoted Phillips to the Triple-A Arkansas Travelers of the Pacific Coast League (PCL). He hit .304, with 96 runs scored, 29 home runs, 87 RBIs and a .949 OPS. Among players with more than 400 at bats in the PCL, he was tied for third in runs scored, fourth in OPS, and fifth in home runs. He was called up to the Phillies at the end of the 1964 season, where he had three hits in 13 at bats. He was on the Phillies during their September collapse, losing ten consecutive games after having been securely in first place, that cost them the 1964 National League pennant.

Phillips began the 1965 season with the Travelers. He hit .285 in 295 at bats, with 14 home runs, 48 runs scored, 40 RBIs and an .846 OPS when he was called up to the Phillies in July.

== Major league career ==
=== Philadelphia Phillies ===
Phillips was called up to the Phillies in mid-July 1965, and played in his first game on July 15, as a pinch hitter. He appeared in 41 games for the Phillies that season, starting 21 in centerfield. He hit .230 in 87 at bats, with three home runs and 14 runs scored. He began the 1966 season with the Phillies, but after appearing in only two games, on April 21 he was traded along with rookie Ferguson Jenkins, and John Hernstein to the Chicago Cubs for pitchers Larry Jackson (34-years old) and Bob Buhl (37-years old). The Phillies were still recovering from their 1964 collapse and were willing to risk trading young players for veteran pitchers in an attempt to win a pennant immediately. The Phillies did not win a National League title until 1980, Jackson pitched three more years and Buhl two, and Jenkins went on to a Hall of Fame career; the trade being considered one of the very worst in Phillies history.

=== Chicago Cubs ===
In 1966, Phillips played in 116 games for the Cubs, batting .262 in 416 at bats. He had 16 home runs, 68 runs scored and 38 RBIs, with an .800 OPS. He was fourth on the team in home runs and runs scored. He started 107 games in center field for the Cubs.

Cubs Hall of Fame manager Leo Durocher had been hard on Phillips’s mental errors in 1966, and decided to use a more positive approach to bring out Phillips’s best in 1967. And Phillips’s best Major League season came in 1967, when he had career highs in batting average (.268), home runs (17), runs batted in (70), OPS (.842) and bases on balls (80), and a career second best in runs scored (66). He led the Major Leagues in intentional base on balls with 29. He reduced his strikeouts from 135 to 93 in 32 more at bats. On June 11, 1967, in the second game of a doubleheader at Wrigley Field, Phillips hit three home runs in the Cubs' 18–10 victory over the New York Mets. Phillips also hit a home run in the first game of the double header, giving him four on the day. The second game home runs came in three consecutive at-bats; not until Tuffy Rhodes in 1994, would a Cub hit three home runs in a game at Wrigley in three consecutive trips to the plate.

In 1968, Phillips appeared in 143 games for the Cubs. He hit .241, with 13 home runs, 49 runs scored and 33 RBIs. He began the 1969 season with the Cubs, and had appeared in 28 games with only 49 at bats when he was traded along with Jack Lamabe to the expansion Montreal Expos for Paul Popovich on June 11.

=== Montreal Expos and Cleveland Indians ===
He started 48 games in centerfield for the Expos, during the team's first year in Major League Baseball, batting only .216 in 199 at bats, with four home runs, 25 runs scored and seven RBIs. In 1970, he started 52 games in center field for the Expos, batting .238 in 214 at bats. He hit six home runs, with 36 runs scored and 21 RBIs.

He played for two Triple-A MiLB teams in 1971, the Winnipeg Whips and the Salt Lake City Angels, where he had a combined .276 batting average in 243 at bats. In December 1971, the Expos sold Phillips's contract rights to the Cleveland Indians. 1972 was his final season in Major League Baseball, appearing in 12 games for Cleveland, without a hit.

Phillips finished his major league career with a .247 batting average, 59 home runs, 270 runs scored, 173 RBIs, a .753 OPS and 82 stolen bases.

== Mexican League ==
He continued playing baseball in the Mexican League, from 1973 to 1975 with Diablos Rojos del Mexico, and in 1976 with Mineros de Coahuila.

In 1979, he played 12 games for the Panama Banqueros in the short-lived Inter-American League.
