= Jarry Park Stadium =

Sports venue in Montreal

- Stade Parc Jarry
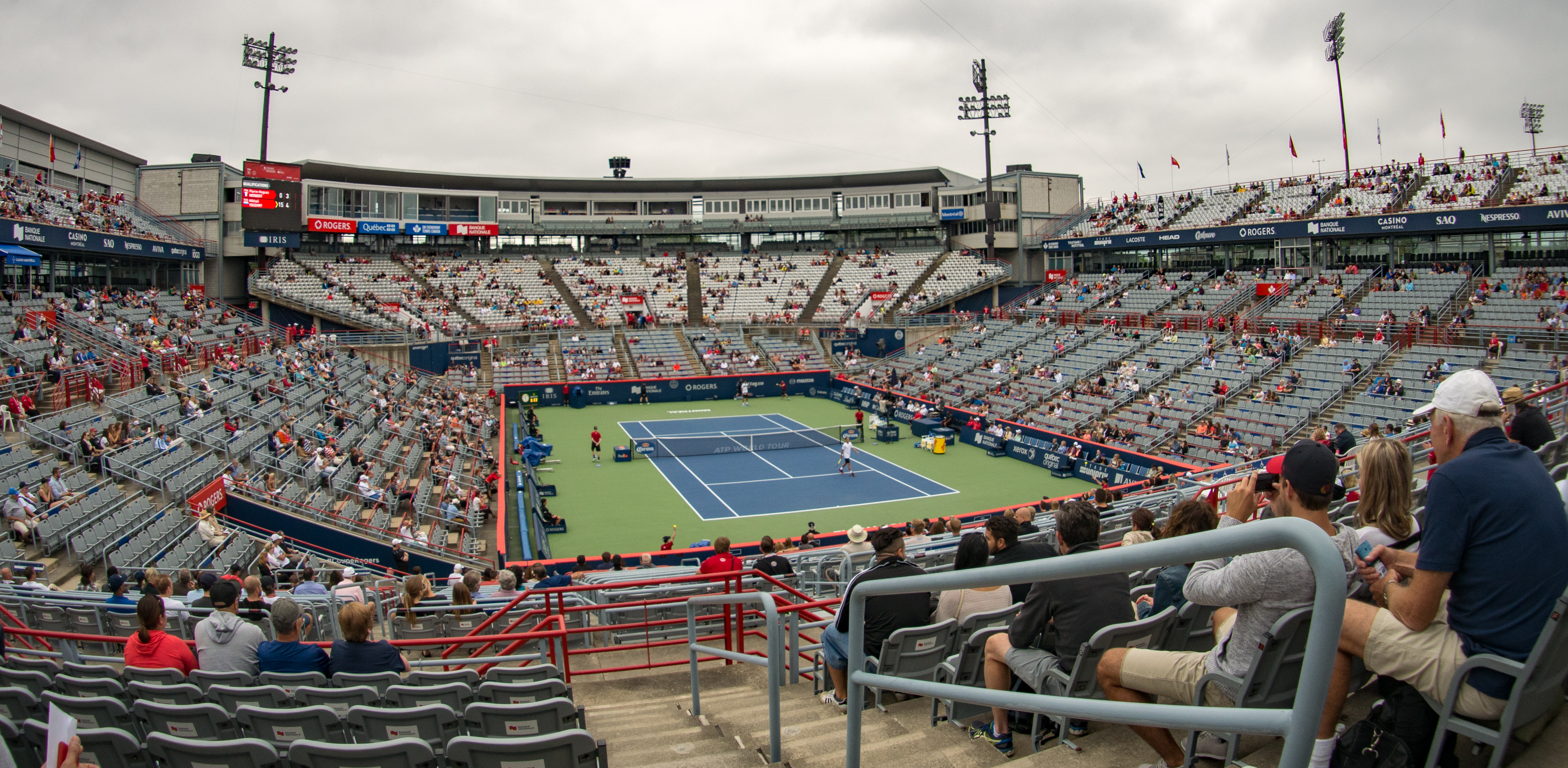
- Jarry Park Stadium in August 2015

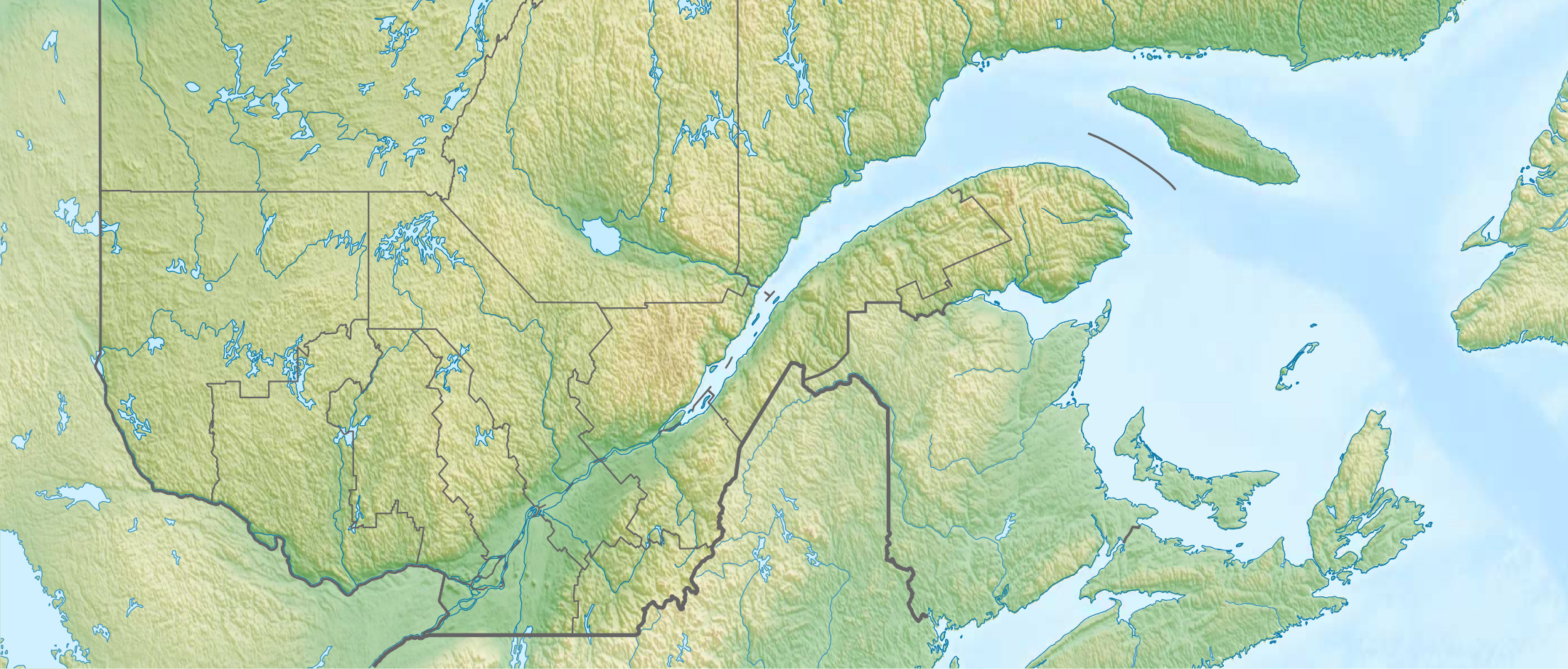
- Location within Montreal Location within Quebec South Location within Quebec Location within Canada
- Interactive map of Jarry Park Stadium
- Location: Montreal
- Coordinates: 45°31′58″N 73°37′37″W
- Owner: City of Montreal
- Capacity: 3,000 (1960–1969); 28,000 (1969–present)
- Surface: Grass
- Field size: Left field – 340 ft (103 m); Left-centre – 368 ft (112 m); Centre field – 420 ft (128 m); Right-centre – 368 ft (112 m); Right field – 340 ft (103 m); Backstop – 60 ft (18 m)

Construction
- Opened: August 1960 (Baseball)
- Closed: September 26, 1976 (Baseball)

Tenants
- Montreal Expos (MLB) 1969–1976; Inter-Montreal FC (CPSL) 1983

Jarry Park Stadium (French: Stade Parc Jarry [stad paʁk ʒaʁi]) is a former baseball stadium, home to the Montreal Expos (now Washington Nationals), from 1969 through 1976, located in Montreal, Quebec, Canada. The Expos were Major League Baseball's first Canadian franchise. It served as a temporary home (for their eight seasons) until Olympic Stadium was made available to the Expos in 1977. The ballpark was typically called simply (and inaccurately, since the stadium was built within the larger park) "Jarry Park" or Parc Jarry.

The stadium hosted two National Football League (NFL) preseason games in 1969; August 25 (Detroit Lions vs. Boston Patriots), and September 11 (New York Giants vs. Pittsburgh Steelers). Both games drew poorly (8,812 and 12,724, respectively) and no more US pro football games were attempted at Jarry Park. (The NFL would not return to Montreal until Olympic Stadium hosted exhibition contests in 1988 and 1990.)

== History (1960-1995) ==
Before Jarry Park Stadium, Montreal's main baseball stadium was Delorimier Stadium, the longtime home of the Montreal Royals. The diamond at Jarry Park had simply hosted youth baseball on a field in the park. However, in early 1960, the Montreal Royals were dropped by the Los Angeles Dodgers as an affiliate.

Looking to improve facilities for a stadium in Montreal, the 3,000-seat Jarry Park Stadium was built, formally opening in August 1960. After the Dodgers ended their affiliation with the Royals, potential new owners of the team had an option on the franchise, with the provision that a suitable ballpark be put in place. Unable to negotiate an agreement to play at the aging Delorimier Stadium, the group looked to spacious Jarry Park as the alternate site. The Jarry Park Stadium was built for this reason. However, even after the construction, the Royals franchise relocated to Syracuse, New York in 1960.

When the original baseball field was later approved for the Expos, it was renovated to a park approaching major league standards. Unroofed extensions were built from the original stands to the left and right field corners, a large bleacher section was constructed across the left field, and a scoreboard was built behind the right-field fence. This work brought the stadium's capacity to 28,500, and the park was approved as the Expos' temporary home.

== Features and dimensions ==
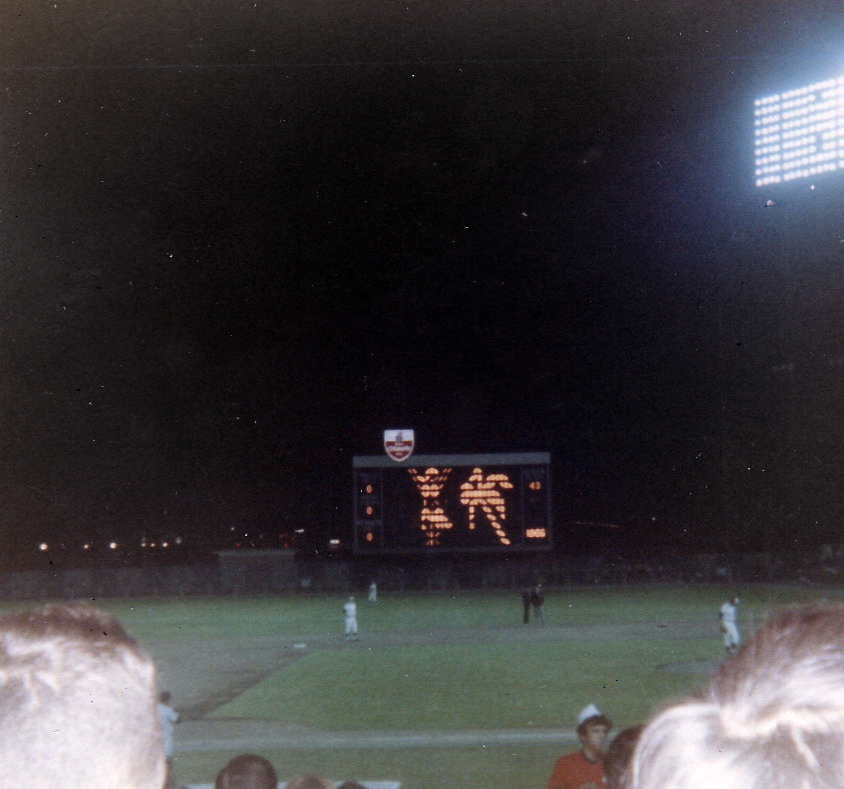
The scoreboard at Jarry Park Stadium, 1969

Beyond the right field fence and scoreboard was a pre-existing swimming pool in the city park. Long before the "splash hits" at Oracle Park in San Francisco and PNC Park in Pittsburgh, there were occasional "splash hits" here. The first and most famous was a 495-foot (151 m) blast by Pirates outfielder Willie Stargell on July 16, 1969, leading locals to call the pool "Willie's pool" (French: la piscine de Willie). Another was hit by Willie McCovey of the Padres during a 6–4 win over the Expos on May 5, 1976. The idea of the swimming pool itself was later replicated in Chase Field in Phoenix, which opened in 1998.

The stadium was austere, as it was intended to be only a temporary home for a maximum of four years. The clubhouses were located along the left-field line behind the stands. Due to its unorthodox north-northwest orientation (home plate to second base), games in April and September frequently started with the setting sun shining right in the faces of first basemen. Eventually, it was decided to delay games until the sun finished setting. It was completely exposed to the elements, which was a particular problem at the beginning and end of the season, given Montreal's long winters. There was a huge gap between the left-field bleachers and the third-base grandstands, resulting in second basemen and shortstops getting buffeted by cold winds early and late in the season. The Expos frequently had to postpone early and late-season games because the fans had no protection. Even allowing for its temporary status, the field conditions were among the worst in the majors.

Although the center field distance was posted as 420 feet (128 m); it was actually 417 feet (127 m) to straightaway center, and 420 to the deep left and right center field corners.

== Montreal Expos ==
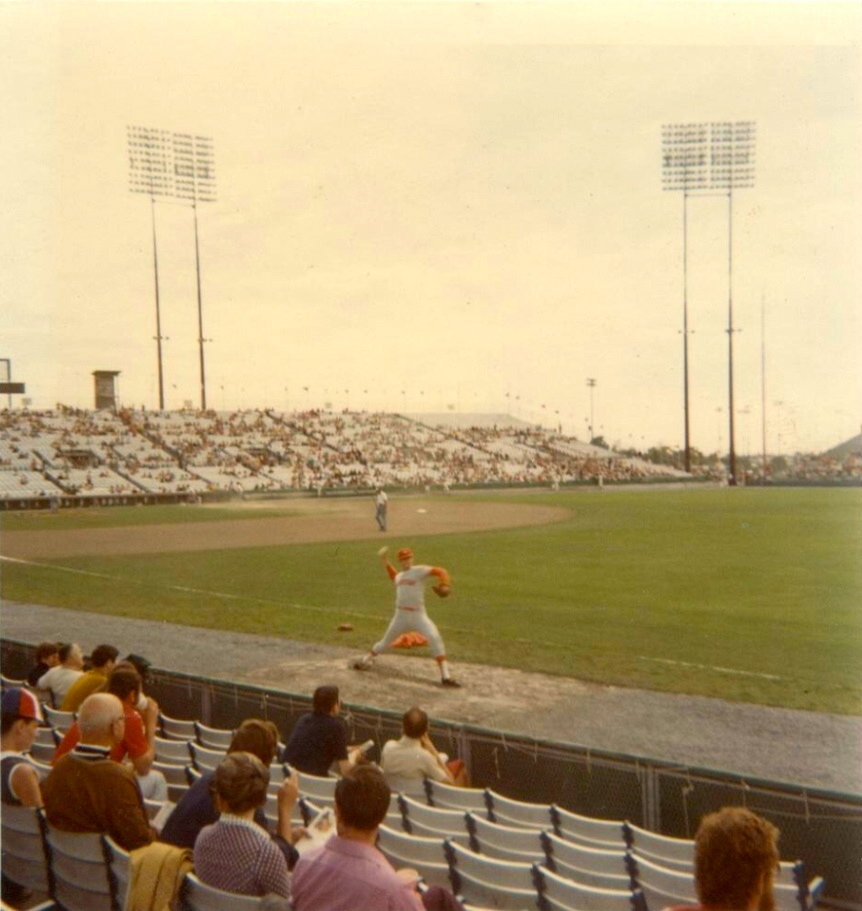
Houston Astros pitcher Ken Forsch warms up at Jarry Park Stadium in 1971.

In their first expansion since 1962, Major League Baseball added four new franchises for the 1969 season. Along with San Diego, Seattle and Kansas City, Montreal was granted a Major League franchise. This marked the first time a team was located outside of the United States. Montreal, Canada's largest city at the time, had a strong tradition with minor league baseball, as the Montreal Royals were a long-time Dodgers farm team. Jackie Robinson had played for the Royals in 1946, before his promotion to the Dodgers in 1947, breaking the color barrier. Icon Roberto Clemente was another Montreal Royal player, as were Dodgers legends Duke Snider, Don Drysdale, Roy Campanella and Tommy Lasorda. At the time the major league expansion announcement was made, Montreal had just hosted the 1967 World's Fair, called Expo '67, opened a new subway system and submitted (and eventually won) an international bid to host the 1976 Summer Olympic Games.

Owner Charles Bronfman called the new franchise the Expos (after the World's Fair) and hired Gene Mauch as Manager.

When the Expos were announced as an expansion franchise in 1967, one condition for placing an MLB franchise in Montreal was that a domed stadium—considered a must due to Montreal's harsh winter weather—be in place for the 1972 season. Until that time, finding a site for the Expos to play proved to be a challenge. Delorimier Stadium was ruled out because its location made it impossible to expand beyond its 20,000-seat capacity (it was eventually demolished in 1971). Other options were the Autostade from Expo 67, a World's fair which had inspired the new club's nickname. However, the city balked at the cost of adding a dome and 12,000 seats, and the Canadian Football League's Montreal Alouettes demanded onerous rent.

The Expos were now in a bind—if they did not find another site quickly, the National League would strip Montreal of its franchise and award it to Buffalo, which already had a suitable stadium. In August 1968, Montreal Mayor Jean Drapeau persuaded National League President Warren Giles to visit Jarry Park (Parc Jarry). Giles liked the site's location—less than one mile (1.6 km) from a highway and 200 yards (180 m) from a commuter railroad.

After settling in at Jarry Park Stadium, a strike delayed the original 1972 completion of a domed stadium. Due to further delays and cost overruns, the Expos wound up playing eight seasons in Jarry Park. After Montreal was selected in 1970 to host the 1976 Summer Olympic Games, the stadium projects of the baseball team and of the Summer Olympic Games merged. When it became apparent that Olympic Stadium would not be ready in time, the Expos were forced to seek permission from MLB to stay at Jarry Park Stadium for one more season. Further construction delays eventually forced the Expos to repeat the process until Olympic Stadium was finally ready for baseball for the 1977 season. For a time during the 1976–77 offseason, it looked like the Expos would have to open the 1977 season at Jarry Park due to delays in securing a lease at Olympic Stadium; indeed, the Expos began selling 1977 season tickets under the assumption they would have to play at Jarry. However, an agreement was finally reached in early 1977, allowing the Expos to open 1977 at the new Olympic Stadium.

On the field, the Expos finished 52-110 in their first year. They improved over the years, winning over 70 games in 1970, 1971 and 1972 and came close to the .500 mark in both 1973 and 1974. Their most popular player during the Jarry Park era was Rusty Staub, nicknamed "le Grand Orange." Other players of note at Jarry Park were: Maury Wills, Willie Davis, Ron Fairly, Carl Morton, Ken Singleton and Ron Hunt. Future Hall of Famer Gary Carter debuted in 1974 at age 20. Warren Cromartie, Steve Rogers, Larry Parrish, Ellis Valentine and the great Andre Dawson were all young Expos who played their debut seasons at Jarry Park.

The Washington Nationals honored Jarry Park during their franchise's 50th anniversary celebration at Nationals Park on July 6, 2019, by replicating the Expos' original scoreboard.

== Notable baseball moments at Jarry Park ==
1969 Attendance Despite Jarry Park Stadium being the smallest venue in Major League Baseball, the Expos drew 1.2 million fans in 1969.

April 14, 1969: In the first Major League Baseball regular season game in Canada, the Montreal Expos defeated the St. Louis Cardinals, 8–7.

June 25, 1969: The Expos pulled off the second triple play of the major league season and first in their history in the second inning of a game against the St. Louis Cardinals.

1970 Jarry Park served as the home of both an MLB and Class AAA teams in 1970. The Buffalo Bisons (Class AAA; International League) played 13 home games in Jarry Park.

September 29, 1971: Batting against Milt Pappas of the Chicago Cubs, Ron Hunt was hit by a pitch for the 50th time during the season. The Expos won, 6-5, on Hunt's game-winning single in the ninth inning.

May 9, 1972: Willie Mays plays in his final game as a member of the San Francisco Giants. As a pinch-hitter, he gets a single in the ninth inning of a 7-1 Giants' loss to the Expos.

One Major League no-hitter was pitched at Jarry Park. On October 2, 1972, in the first game of a doubleheader against the New York Mets, Bill Stoneman pitched the first MLB no-hitter outside the United States as Montreal won 7-0.

September 9, 1973: A year and a half following his last appearance as a member of the San Francisco Giants, Willie Mays plays the final regular-season game of his career as the Mets defeated the Expos, 3-0, despite 13 Montreal hits.

September 15, 1973: A crowd of 34,331 (the largest ever at Jarry Park Stadium) watches the Expos defeat the Philadelphia Phillies, 5-4. Bob Bailey singles home Ron Woods with the winning run in the 10th inning.

September 28, 1974: Future hall of fame catcher Gary Carter hits his first major league home run off future Hall of Fame Phillies' pitcher Steve Carlton. The Expos win, 3-1.

September 26, 1976: In the last baseball games played at Stade Parc Jarry, the Phillies won both games of a doubleheader, 4-1 and 2-1 (the second game shortened to seven innings due to rain), over the Expos. The win in the first game gave the Phils their first National League East Division title.

== The site today ==
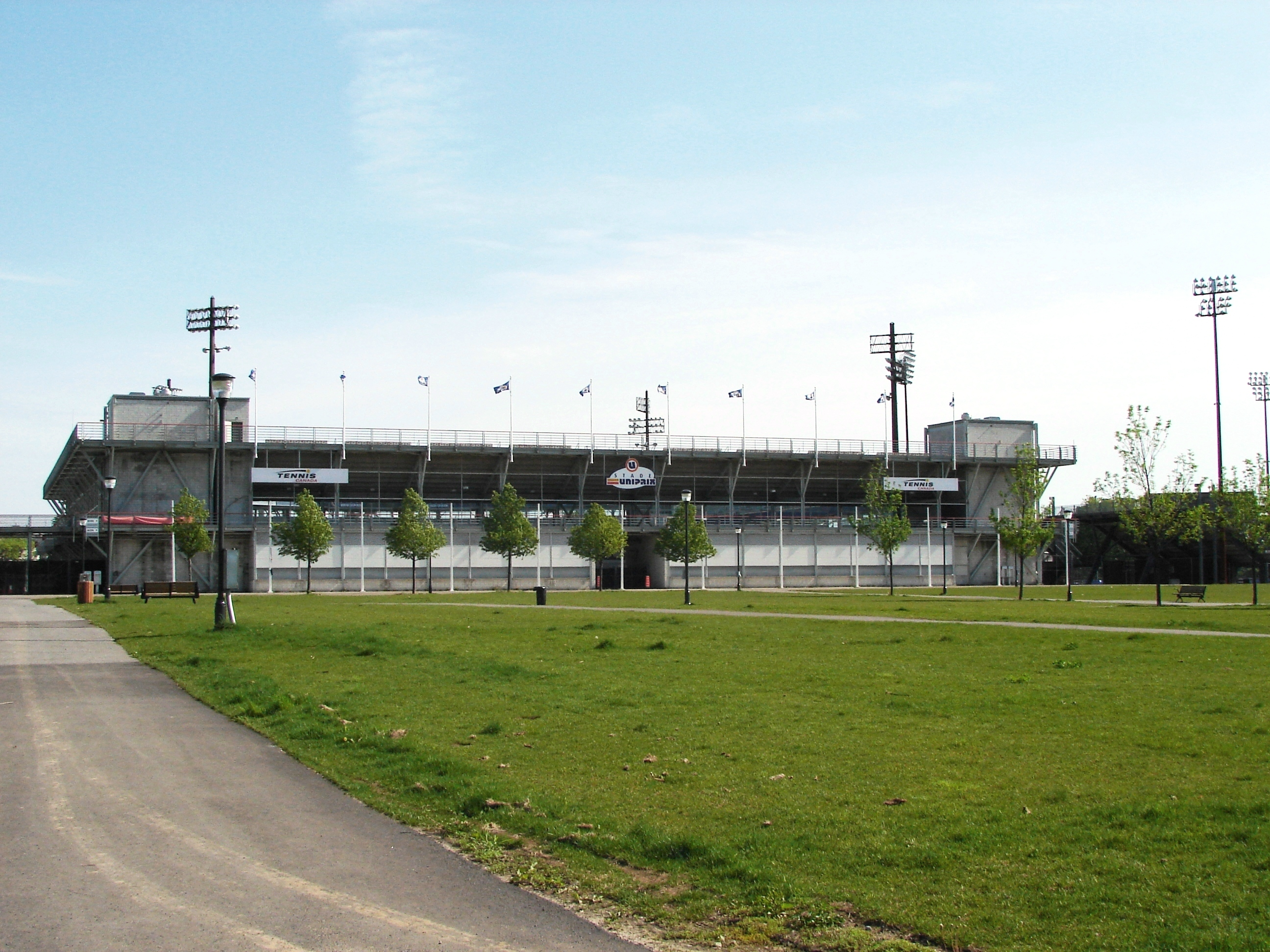
Stade Jarry in 2006

The stadium was used for various civic events in the years after the Expos. The Inter-Montreal soccer team of Canadian Professional Soccer League (CPSL) played at Jarry. Jarry Park Stadium was gradually converted into a tennis stadium, beginning in 1980, with one corner of the court located at the old backstop. The stadium was renamed in honour of Pope John Paul II to mark his visit to Montreal and the park on September 11, 1984. The venue was renamed Du Maurier Stadium in 1987. It has since been upgraded and renamed again, most recently as Stade IGA.

Today, Jarry Park contains baseball diamonds, soccer, cricket, bocce, basketball and beach volleyball grounds, pitches and zones, swimming pools and playgrounds, a dog run, and two gazebos. In winter, a pond is swept to make a skating rink.

== See also ==
- Jarry Park
- IGA Stadium

Preceded by None	Home of the Montreal Expos; 1969–1976	Succeeded by Olympic Stadium
