= Mike Wegener =

American baseball player (1946-2023)

- Pitcher
- Born: October 8, 1946; Denver, Colorado, U.S.
- Died: December 6, 2023 (aged 77); Fort Collins, Colorado, U.S.
- Batted: Right Threw: Right

MLB debut
- April 9, 1969, for the Montreal Expos

Last MLB appearance
- September 26, 1970, for the Montreal Expos

MLB statistics
- Win–loss record: 8–20
- Earned run average: 4.73
- Strikeouts: 159
- Stats at Baseball Reference

Teams
- Montreal Expos (1969–1970)

Michael Denis Wegener (October 8, 1946 – December 6, 2023) was an American Major League Baseball pitcher. The 6 ft 4 in (1.93 m), 215 lb (98 kg) right-hander was signed by the Baltimore Orioles before the 1964 season, selected by the Philadelphia Phillies from Baltimore in the 1964 first-year draft (November 30), and, four years later, chosen by the Montreal Expos as the 15th pick in the 1968 MLB expansion draft. He was born in Denver, Colorado.

Wegener played for the Expos from 1969 to 1970, appearing in 57 games, 42 of them starts. He had "good stuff" but was prone to wildness, as evidenced by 152 bases on balls and 17 wild pitches in just 270 innings pitched. His BB/9IP was 5.07, much higher than the National League average at that time.

Wegener is perhaps best known for giving up Willie Mays's 3,000th hit on July 18, 1970. He would allow eight runs in that game (four earned) as the Giants defeated the Expos, 10–1.

Career highlights include:

- A four-hit, complete game shutout against the San Francisco Giants (June 14, 1969)
- Going 3-for-4 with 4 RBI and pitching the first 7 2/3 innings of an 11–4 victory over the New York Mets. (July 11, 1969)
- Pitching 11 innings with 15 strikeouts, giving up just two runs (both unearned), with no decision, against the New York Mets (September 10, 1969)
- A three-hit, seven strikeout complete game against the Chicago Cubs, winning 8–2 (September 15, 1969)
- A seven-hit, six strikeout complete game against the Chicago Cubs, winning 6–2 (August 5, 1970)

Wegener hit well for a pitcher, with nine runs batted in and a batting average of .193 in 88 lifetime at bats. He was also an excellent fielding pitcher, handling 63 out of 64 total chances successfully for a fielding percentage of .984.

He finished his career with a total of eight wins, 20 losses, and an ERA of 4.73.

Mike died December 6, 2023 in Fort Collins, Colorado after a 32-year battle with stage three non-Hodgkin's lymphoma.
