= Kevin Collins (baseball) =

American baseball player (1946–2016)

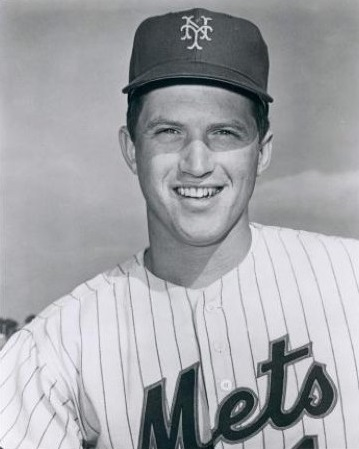
- Third baseman / Second baseman
- Born: August 4, 1946; Springfield, Massachusetts, U.S.
- Died: February 20, 2016 (aged 69); Naples, Florida, U.S.
- Batted: Left Threw: Right

MLB debut
- September 1, 1965, for the New York Mets

Last MLB appearance
- September 29, 1971, for the Detroit Tigers

MLB statistics
- Batting average: .209
- Home runs: 6
- Runs batted in: 34
- Stats at Baseball Reference

Teams
- New York Mets (1965, 1967–1969); Montreal Expos (1969); Detroit Tigers (1970–1971)

Kevin Michael Collins (August 4, 1946 – February 20, 2016) was an American Major League Baseball infielder with the New York Mets, Montreal Expos and Detroit Tigers. He played primarily as a third baseman and sometimes as a second baseman. He also played a few games at other positions, including shortstop, first baseman and outfielder.

Collins was signed by the Mets as an amateur free agent on January 1, 1964, after a high school career at Springfield Tech High School. He began his professional career in 1964 with the Florida Mets, the Mets Rookie League minor league baseball team. He played in 44 games that season, getting 118 at bats and posting a batting average of .220.

In 1965, Collins made his major league debut with the Mets on September 1. He played in 11 games for the Mets in 1965, splitting time between third base and shortstop, getting 23 at-bats and a batting average of .174. At age 19 years, 28 days, he was the 4th youngest player to appear in the major leagues that season.

In 1966, Collins played the entire season in the minor leagues at the Mets class-AA affiliate, the Williamsport Mets. Collins appeared in 122 games for Williamsport, almost entirely as a shortstop, and batted .251 with 6 home runs in 411 at-bats. He earned Eastern League all star honors in 1966.

Collins was promoted to the Jacksonville Suns, the Mets class-AAA affiliate in 1967. There, he played several infield positions, sharing time at second base with Ken Boswell, at shortstop with Sandy Alomar Sr. and at third base with Amos Otis. In all, Collins played 119 games for Jacksonville in 1967, getting 420 at-bats and 3 home runs, with a batting average of .248, a slugging percentage of .321 and an on-base percentage of .289. Collins also played in 4 games with the Mets in September 1967, getting one hit in ten at-bats.

In 1968, Collins again started the year with Jacksonville. He played 28 games at Tidewater, batting .248 in 101 at-bats before being promoted to the Mets. With the Mets in 1968, Collins played in 58 games, mostly as a third baseman. He batted .201 in 154 at-bats. He also hit his first Major League home run that season, on August 6.

Collins began the 1969 season with the Mets. He played 16 games for the Mets, all at third base, getting 40 at-bats but only batting .150. His last game with the Mets before being demoted to the Mets new class-AAA affiliate in Tidewater was on May 4. Collins played in 11 games for Tidewater, batting .250 in 32 at-bats before being traded to the Montreal Expos.

On June 15, 1969, Collins was traded to the Montreal Expos along with Steve Renko, Bill Carden and Dave Colon in exchange for Donn Clendenon. This was a momentous trade in Met history, since Clendenon would go on to be the World Series Most Valuable Player in 1969. Collins appeared in 52 games for the Expos in 1969, split between second base and third base. He batted .240 in 96 at-bats.

After the 1969 season, Collins was sold by the Expos to the Detroit Tigers. With the Tigers in 1970, Collins played only 25 games, mostly as a pinch hitter. He played in only one game in the field, his only career game at first base. He batted .208 in 24 at-bats for the Tigers that season.

Collins only played in 35 games with the Tigers in 1971, and again only a few in the field. In 1971 he played some games at third base, second base and in the outfield. He batted .268 in 41 at-bats, the highest batting average in his major league career.

In June, 1973, Collins was traded by the Tigers along with Tom Timmermann to the Cleveland Indians in exchange for Ed Farmer. Collins never played a game for the Indians and never played a major league game after the trade.

After a few more minor league seasons, Collins retired from baseball in 1974. He declined the opportunity to remain with the Indians as a coach or scout. After retirement, he worked in the automotive supply business, losing part of his right foot in a warehouse accident in 1993.

He was born in Springfield, Massachusetts and died in Naples, Florida.
