= Coco Laboy =

Puerto Rican baseball player (born 1940)

- Third baseman
- Born: 3 July 1940 (age 86); Ponce, Puerto Rico
- Batted: Right Threw: Right

MLB debut
- 8 April, 1969, for the Montreal Expos

Last MLB appearance
- 16 May, 1973, for the Montreal Expos

MLB statistics
- Batting average: .233
- Home runs: 28
- Runs batted in: 166
- Stats at Baseball Reference

Teams
- Montreal Expos (1969–1973)

José Alberto "Coco" Laboy (born 3 July 1940) is a Puerto Rican former professional baseball third baseman who played five seasons in Major League Baseball (MLB). He was signed by the San Francisco Giants as an amateur free agent in 1959 but remained mired in the minor leagues, playing for a while in North Carolina with the Raleigh Cardinals, until the 1969 expansion of major league baseball, which added two teams to both leagues. The expansion Montreal Expos drafted Laboy from the St. Louis Cardinals organization.

== Early years ==
Laboy was born in Ponce, Puerto Rico, on 3 July 1940.

== Career ==
Laboy batted seventh in the inaugural game of the Montreal Expos versus the New York Mets on 8 April 1969, going 1-for-5 with 3 RBIs in the 11–10 win. As a 29-year-old rookie, he excelled at the plate. His 145 hits gave him an average of .258, and he slugged 18 home runs and drove in 83 runs. He tied for second place with Al Oliver for the 1969 National League Rookie of the Year Award, which was won by Ted Sizemore.

In 1970, Laboy's average dropped from .258 to .199 as pitchers adjusted to him and stopped feeding him fastballs. However, he led the Expos with 26 doubles. Anxious to prove that his rookie year was not a fluke, Laboy worked out in the off-season but injured his knee in his first game of the Puerto Rican winter league season. The injury reduced him to 151 at-bats in the 1971 season and he spent most of 1972 on the disabled list after undergoing knee surgery in March.

At 33 years old and with essentially only two full seasons behind him it was hard to come back, particularly with the primitive state of orthopedic surgery at the time. He was released after the 1973 season and was not picked up by any other team. He ended his career with an average of .233/28/166 in 420 games. Exactly half of his RBIs were racked up in his rookie campaign.

Laboy returned to his native Puerto Rico and got a job with the government, where he served for 27 years, eventually becoming director of the Commonwealth's athletic programs.
