= José Herrera (outfielder, born 1942) =

Venezuelan baseball player (1942–2009)

- Outfielder
- Born: April 8, 1942; San Lorenzo, Zulia, Venezuela
- Died: October 16, 2009 (aged 67); Lagunillas, Venezuela
- Batted: Right Threw: Right

MLB debut
- June 3, 1967, for the Houston Astros

Last MLB appearance
- April 6, 1970, for the Montreal Expos

MLB statistics
- Batting average: .264
- Home runs: 2
- Runs batted in: 20
- Stats at Baseball Reference

Teams
- Houston Astros (1967–1968); Montreal Expos (1969–1970)

José Concepción Herrera Ontiveros (April 8, 1942 – October 16, 2009) was a Venezuelan professional baseball player who appeared as an outfielder and second baseman in Major League Baseball for the Houston Astros (1967–1968) and Montreal Expos (1969–1970). He batted and threw right-handed, stood 5 feet 8 inches (1.73 m) tall and weighed 165 pounds (75 kg).

== Career ==
Born in San Lorenzo in Zulia, Herrera was signed by the Houston Colt .45s in 1964 as an amateur free agent and made his debut with the team on June 3, 1967, two years after it became the Astros. He was recalled after batting over .280 during his first three minor league seasons. It was an unusual debut: Houston third baseman Bob Aspromonte, facing future Baseball Hall of Famer Jim Bunning of the Philadelphia Phillies in the fifth inning, protested a strike two call and was ejected from the game by umpire Frank Secory; Herrera, called upon to pinch hit with a two-strike count already on him, struck out—with the "K" charged to Aspromonte. Herrera later made four more pinch-hitting appearances that June, collecting one single in four official at bats and one run batted in. In 1968, Herrera batted over .300 in Triple-A and was rewarded with a more extended call-up to Houston, appearing in 27 games, and starting in 16 games in the outfield and seven at second base. He hit .240 with five extra-base hits, and was not protected in the 1968 National League expansion draft. The Expos selected him with the 29th overall pick.

The 1969 season would see Herrera's most extended MLB service. After hitting .301 in Triple-A, he appeared in 47 games for Montreal from June 17 through the end of the season, including 31 starts as an outfielder. He got off the mark quickly, batting over .350 into mid-August, and was still hitting .323 on September 1 with 11 multi-hit games, and his first two big-league home runs, struck July 24 and 26 against the Atlanta Braves at Fulton County Stadium. But he leveled off in September to finish at .286. Herrera had only one at bat on Opening Day 1970 at Crosley Field, Cincinnati, as a pinch hitter and struck out in his final MLB appearance.

He played six more years in the upper minors, including four in the Mexican League, before leaving the game in 1975.

In his MLB career of parts of four seasons, Herrera posted a .264 batting average with two home runs, 20 RBI, 16 runs, 61 hits, and ten doubles in 80 games played. He died in Lagunillas Municipality, Zulia, in his native country in 2009 at age 67.

== See also ==
- List of Major League Baseball players from Venezuela
