= Remy Hermoso =

Venezuelan baseball player (1947–2020)

- Second baseman / Shortstop
- Born: October 1, 1947; Puerto Cabello, Carabobo, Venezuela
- Died: August 21, 2020 (aged 72); Puerto Cabello, Carabobo, Venezuela
- Batted: Right Threw: Right

MLB debut
- September 14, 1967, for the Atlanta Braves

Last MLB appearance
- September 30, 1974, for the Cleveland Indians

MLB statistics
- Batting average: .211
- Home runs: 0
- Runs batted in: 8
- Stats at Baseball Reference

Teams
- Atlanta Braves (1967); Montreal Expos (1969–1970); Cleveland Indians (1974)

Member of the Venezuelan

Baseball Hall of Fame
- Induction: 2015

Ángel Remigio Hermoso (October 1, 1947 – August 21, 2020), commonly known as Remy Hermoso (er-mo'-so), was a Venezuelan Major League Baseball (MLB) shortstop and right-handed batter who played for the Atlanta Braves (1967), Montreal Expos (1969–70) and Cleveland Indians (1974).

== Career ==
A native from Carabobo State, Venezuela, Hermoso was signed by the Braves as an amateur free agent before the 1967 season. In a three-season career, Hermoso hit .211 (47-for-223) with three doubles, one triple, 25 runs, and eight RBI in 91 games.

In Venezuela, Hermoso debuted with the Tiburones de La Guaira in the 1966–67, playing with them until 1975. He also played for Llaneros de Portuguesa (1975-1976) and the Navegantes del Magallanes (1976-1977). In 11 seasons in the Venezuelan Professional Baseball League, he had 594 hits and 61 stolen bases. He won three LVBP championships: two with La Guaira (1969, 1971) and one with Magallanes (1977).

Hermoso also managed the Venezuela national baseball team at the 1983 Pan American Games, held in Caracas.

In 2015, he was enshrined into the Venezuelan Baseball Hall of Fame and Museum.

Hermoso died on August 21, 2020, at the age of 72.

== See also ==
- List of players from Venezuela in Major League Baseball
- Montreal Expos all-time roster
