= Garry Jestadt =

American baseball player (born 1947)

- Third baseman / Second baseman
- Born: March 19, 1947 (age 78); Chicago, Illinois, U.S.
- Batted: Right Threw: Right

Professional debut
- MLB: September 17, 1969, for the Montreal Expos
- NPB: April 5, 1975, for the Nippon-Ham Fighters

Last appearance
- MLB: October 4, 1972, for the San Diego Padres
- NPB: October 22, 1976, for the Taiyo Whales

MLB statistics
- Batting average: .260
- Home runs: 6
- Runs batted in: 36
- Stats at Baseball Reference

Teams
- Montreal Expos (1969); Chicago Cubs (1971); San Diego Padres (1971–1972); Nippon-Ham Fighters (1975); Taiyo Whales (1976)

Garry Arthur Jestadt (born March 19, 1947) is an American former Major League Baseball infielder who played for the Montreal Expos, San Diego Padres and Chicago Cubs for all or portions of three seasons (1969 and 1971–1972). Jestadt graduated from Fremont High School in Oakland, California, and attended Arizona State University. He threw and batted right-handed, stood 6 feet 2 inches (1.88 m) tall and weighed 188 pounds (85 kg).

Jestadt was selected by the Cubs in the seventh round of the first amateur draft in MLB history in June 1965. After four seasons, during which Jestadt could not surpass the Double-A level, Montreal chose him with the 43rd pick in the October 1968 National League expansion draft. In September 1969, the Expos called him up after the minor-league season, with Jestadt going hitless in six at bats. The following April, he was traded off the Expos' Buffalo roster back to the Cubs. But his original organization gave him only a three-game, three-at-bat "cup of coffee" in April 1971 before swapping him to the Padres on May 19 for veteran catcher Chris Cannizzaro.

Jestadt then appeared in 167 Major League games played with the Padres as the club's backup second baseman and third baseman. His 118 MLB hits included 18 doubles and one triple, as well as six home runs. He played 11 seasons of minor league baseball, as well as two campaigns in Nippon Professional Baseball (NPB).
