= Carroll Sembera =

American baseball player (1941–2005)

- Topps baseball card – 1967 Series, #136
- Pitcher
- Born: July 26, 1941; Shiner, Texas, U.S.
- Died: June 15, 2005 (aged 63); Shiner, Texas, U.S.
- Batted: Right Threw: Right

MLB debut
- September 28, 1965, for the Houston Astros

Last MLB appearance
- April 26, 1970, for the Montreal Expos

MLB statistics
- Win–loss record: 3–11
- Earned run average: 4.70
- Strikeouts: 94
- Stats at Baseball Reference

Teams
- Houston Astros (1965–1967); Montreal Expos (1969–1970)

Carroll William Sembera (July 26, 1941 – June 15, 2005) was an American professional baseball relief pitcher, who played in Major League Baseball (MLB) for the Houston Astros (1965–67) and Montreal Expos (1969–70).

In a five-season MLB career, Sembera posted a 3–11 record with a 4.70 ERA and six saves in 99 games pitched.

Sembera made his MLB debut with the Astros in 1965 at the age of 23. In 1967, he recorded career highs in games (45), innings pitched (59.2) and games finished (15). Sembera also pitched for the Expos in 1969 and 1970. Sembera earned the first save in Expos history on opening day in 1969.

Following his career as a player, Sembera scouted for the Major League Scouting Bureau and with the Seattle Mariners for eleven years.

Sembera died in his hometown of Shiner, Texas, at the age of 63.
