= Bob Bailey (baseball) =

American baseball player (1942–2018)

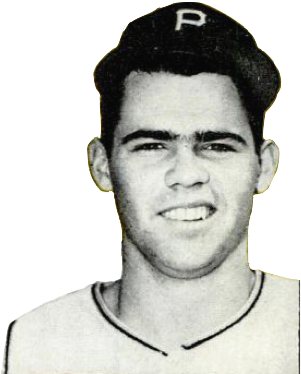
- Bailey in 1963
- Third baseman
- Born: October 13, 1942; Long Beach, California, U.S.
- Died: January 9, 2018 (aged 75); Las Vegas, Nevada, U.S.
- Batted: Right Threw: Right

MLB debut
- September 14, 1962, for the Pittsburgh Pirates

Last MLB appearance
- October 2, 1978, for the Boston Red Sox

MLB statistics
- Batting average: .257
- Home runs: 189
- Runs batted in: 773
- Stats at Baseball Reference

Teams
- Pittsburgh Pirates (1962–1966); Los Angeles Dodgers (1967–1968); Montreal Expos (1969–1975); Cincinnati Reds (1976–1977); Boston Red Sox (1977–1978)

Career highlights and awards
- World Series champion (1976)

Robert Sherwood Bailey (October 13, 1942 – January 9, 2018) was an American professional baseball player. He played 17 seasons in Major League Baseball (MLB) between 1962 and 1978 for the Pittsburgh Pirates, Los Angeles Dodgers, Montreal Expos, Cincinnati Reds, and Boston Red Sox, primarily as a third baseman but he also played games in the outfield and first base.

== Early life ==
Bailey attended Wilson Classical High School, where he was the 1961 CIF Baseball Player of the Year. He quarterbacked the football team for two years, one of which was undefeated.

== Career ==
He was signed out of high school by the Pittsburgh Pirates as a bonus baby and made his debut with the Pirates at age 19. After the 1966 season, the Pirates traded Bailey and Gene Michael to the Los Angeles Dodgers for Maury Wills. The Dodgers sold Bailey to the expansion Montreal Expos following the 1968 season and he became a fixture in the Montreal lineup. He batted fifth in the inaugural game of the Expos versus the New York Mets on April 8, 1969, going 2-for-4 with two RBIs and one walk in the 11-10 win. The Cincinnati Reds acquired Bailey from the Expos for Clay Kirby on December 12, 1975, and he was a member of the Reds team that swept the New York Yankees in the 1976 World Series.

In a 17-season career, Bailey posted a .257 batting average with 189 home runs and 773 Runs batted in in 1931 games played. He led the National League in Double Plays turned by a Third baseman in 1963, Double Plays turned by a Left fielder in 1974 and Fielding percentage by a Third baseman in 1971.

Bailey struck out on three pitches against Goose Gossage in his final plate appearance for the Boston Red Sox against the Yankees in the 1978 American League East tie-breaker game. With no out and one on in the bottom of the seventh, Bailey pinch-hit for Jack Brohamer in what proved to be a massive tactical error by Red Sox manager Don Zimmer. Zimmer expected the right-handed Bailey to face left-handed Yankees ace Ron Guidry, so Zimmer sent Bailey into the on-deck circle. Instead, Yankees manager Bob Lemon brought in the right-handed Gossage, and since Bailey had been announced as the pinch-hitter for the left-handed Brohamer, plate umpire Don Denkinger told Zimmer he could not recall Bailey and put Brohamer back in. The Red Sox lost 5-4.

== Later life ==
After his playing days were over, Bailey was a minor league manager and hitting instructor, most notably in the Montreal Expos organization. In 1987, he was the final manager of the Hawaii Islanders.

Bailey died on January 9, 2018, at the age of 75.
