= Don Bosch =

American baseball player (born 1942)

- Center fielder
- Born: July 15, 1942 (age 83); San Francisco, California, U.S.
- Batted: Right Threw: Right

MLB debut
- September 19, 1966, for the Pittsburgh Pirates

Last MLB appearance
- July 9, 1969, for the Montreal Expos

MLB statistics
- Batting average: .164
- Home runs: 4
- Runs batted in: 13
- Stats at Baseball Reference

Teams
- Pittsburgh Pirates (1966); New York Mets (1967–1968); Montreal Expos (1969)

Donald John Bosch (born July 15, 1942) is an American former Major League Baseball (MLB) player and minor league baseball all-star.

Bosch was signed by the Pittsburgh Pirates as an amateur free agent in 1960. He made it to the major league club in 1966. In between, Bosch made stops in Kingsport, Batavia, Grand Forks, Kinston, Asheville, and Columbus. While with the Kinston Eagles, in 1963, he was named to the Carolina League all-star team and in 1966 while a member of the Columbus Jets he made the International League all-star team.

Following the 1966 season, Bosch was traded by the Pirates with Don Cardwell to the New York Mets for Dennis Ribant and Gary Kolb. He played in 94 big league games for the Mets during 1967 and 1968. He also spent some time during both years in the International League.

After the 1968 campaign, Bosch was purchased by the Montreal Expos from the Mets. The Expos brought him up to the big leagues for 49 games in 1969. A knee injury forced him to undergo surgery in Montreal on July 17, ending his season, and the injury essentially ended his effectiveness in the outfield.

During the 1970 season, Bosch was traded by the Expos to the Houston Astros for Mike Marshall. Bosch spent the season in Oklahoma City and Buffalo-Winnipeg before leaving professional baseball. His combined major league record was a .164 batting average, 52 hits, 6 doubles, a triple and four home runs in 146 games - all as an outfielder.
