= 1967 in baseball =

The following are the baseball events of the year 1967 throughout the world.

== Champions ==
=== Major League Baseball ===
- World Series: St. Louis Cardinals over Boston Red Sox (4–3); Bob Gibson, MVP
- All-Star Game, July 11 at Anaheim Stadium: National League, 2–1 (15 innings); Tony Pérez, MVP

=== Other champions ===
- College World Series: Arizona State
- Japan Series: Yomiuri Giants over Hankyu Braves (4–2)
- Little League World Series: West Tokyo, Japan
- Senior League World Series: Westbury, New York
- Pan American Games: United States over Cuba

== Awards and honors ==
- Baseball Hall of Fame
  - Red Ruffing
  - Lloyd Waner
  - Branch Rickey (executive)

Baseball Writers' Association of America Awards
BBWAA Award	National League	American League
Rookie of the Year	Tom Seaver (NYM)	Rod Carew (MIN)
Cy Young Award	Mike McCormick (SF)	Jim Lonborg (BOS)
Most Valuable Player	Orlando Cepeda (STL)	Carl Yastrzemski (BOS)
Gold Glove Awards
Position	National League	American League
Pitcher	Bob Gibson (STL)	Jim Kaat (MIN)
Catcher	Randy Hundley (CHC)	Bill Freehan (DET)
1st Base	Wes Parker (LAD)	George Scott (BOS)
2nd Base	Bill Mazeroski (PIT)	Bobby Knoop (CAL)
3rd Base	Ron Santo (CHC)	Brooks Robinson (BAL)
Shortstop	Gene Alley (PIT)	Jim Fregosi (CAL)
Outfield	Roberto Clemente (PIT)	Paul Blair (BAL)
Outfield	Curt Flood (STL)	Al Kaline (DET)
Outfield	Willie Mays (SF)	Carl Yastrzemski (BOS)

== Statistical leaders ==
	American League		National League	
Stat	Player	Total	Player	Total
AVG	Carl Yastrzemski^{1} (BOS)	.326	Roberto Clemente (PIT)	.357
HR	Harmon Killebrew (MIN); Carl Yastrzemski^{1} (BOS)	44	Hank Aaron (ATL)	39
RBI	Carl Yastrzemski^{1} (BOS)	121	Orlando Cepeda (STL)	111
W	Jim Lonborg (BOS); Earl Wilson (DET)	22	Mike McCormick (SF)	22
ERA	Joe Horlen (CWS)	2.06	Phil Niekro (ATL)	1.87
K	Jim Lonborg (BOS)	246	Jim Bunning (PHI)	253

^{1} American League Triple Crown batting winner

== Major league baseball final standings ==
=== American League final standings ===
American League
Team	W	L	Pct.	GB	Home	Road
Boston Red Sox	92	70	.568	—	49‍–‍32	43‍–‍38
Detroit Tigers	91	71	.562	1	52‍–‍29	39‍–‍42
Minnesota Twins	91	71	.562	1	52‍–‍29	39‍–‍42
Chicago White Sox	89	73	.549	3	49‍–‍33	40‍–‍40
California Angels	84	77	.522	7½	53‍–‍30	31‍–‍47
Washington Senators	76	85	.472	15½	40‍–‍40	36‍–‍45
Baltimore Orioles	76	85	.472	15½	35‍–‍42	41‍–‍43
Cleveland Indians	75	87	.463	17	36‍–‍45	39‍–‍42
New York Yankees	72	90	.444	20	43‍–‍38	29‍–‍52
Kansas City Athletics	62	99	.385	29½	37‍–‍44	25‍–‍55

Locations of teams for the 1966–1967 American League seasons
American League

=== National League final standings ===
National League
Team	W	L	Pct.	GB	Home	Road
St. Louis Cardinals	101	60	.627	—	49‍–‍32	52‍–‍28
San Francisco Giants	91	71	.562	10½	51‍–‍31	40‍–‍40
Chicago Cubs	87	74	.540	14	49‍–‍34	38‍–‍40
Cincinnati Reds	87	75	.537	14½	49‍–‍32	38‍–‍43
Philadelphia Phillies	82	80	.506	19½	45‍–‍35	37‍–‍45
Pittsburgh Pirates	81	81	.500	20½	49‍–‍32	32‍–‍49
Atlanta Braves	77	85	.475	24½	48‍–‍33	29‍–‍52
Los Angeles Dodgers	73	89	.451	28½	42‍–‍39	31‍–‍50
Houston Astros	69	93	.426	32½	46‍–‍35	23‍–‍58
New York Mets	61	101	.377	40½	36‍–‍42	25‍–‍59

Locations of teams for the 1966–1968 National League seasons
National League

== Nippon Professional Baseball final standings ==
=== Central League final standings ===
Central League	G	W	L	T	Pct.	GB
Yomiuri Giants	134	84	46	4	.646	—
Chunichi Dragons	134	72	58	4	.554	12.0
Hanshin Tigers	136	70	60	6	.538	14.0
Taiyo Whales	135	59	71	5	.454	25.0
Sankei Atoms	135	58	72	5	.446	26.0
Hiroshima Carp	138	47	83	8	.362	37.0

=== Pacific League final standings ===
Pacific League	G	W	L	T	Pct.	GB
Hankyu Braves	134	75	55	4	.577	—
Nishitetsu Lions	140	66	64	10	.508	9.0
Toei Flyers	134	65	65	4	.500	10.0
Nankai Hawks	133	64	66	3	.492	11.0
Tokyo Orions	137	61	69	7	.469	14.0
Kintetsu Buffaloes	132	59	71	2	.454	16.0

== Events ==
=== January ===
- January 11 – John McHale quits as president of the Atlanta Braves to become chief of staff to Commissioner of Baseball William Eckert. McHale, 45, replaces Lee MacPhail, who was named general manager of the New York Yankees in October 1966.
- January 23 – Future Baseball Hall of Famer Stan Musial is named general manager of the St. Louis Cardinals, replacing Bob Howsam, who one day earlier took a similar position with the Cincinnati Reds. Musial will spend only one season as the Redbirds' GM, but it results in a World Series championship. Howsam will turn around the fortunes of the Reds into a 1970s dynasty as "The Big Red Machine," which will win four National League pennants and two World Series titles between 1970 and 1976.
- January 28 – The Boston Red Sox select future Baseball Hall of Fame catcher and native New Englander Carlton Fisk in the first round, fourth overall, of the January 1967 amateur draft. Fisk, 19, is a sophomore at the University of New Hampshire.
- January 29 – Executive Branch Rickey, who died in 1965, and outfielder Lloyd Waner, now 60, are elected to the Hall of Fame by a unanimous vote of the Special Veterans Committee.

=== February ===
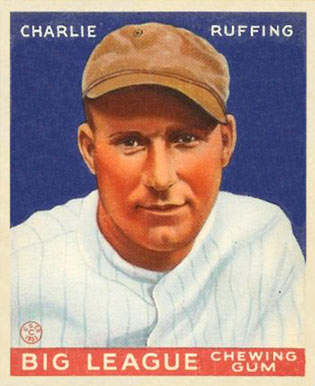
Red Ruffing

- February 1 – Mickey Mantle, 35, signs his fifth straight contract valued at $100,000 or more with the New York Yankees and reveals that he will switch from the outfield to first base to protect his often-injured legs. His outfielding days over (his last occurring September 18, 1966), Mantle will start 130 games at first in each of the next two seasons before his March 1969 retirement.
- February 10 – The New York Mets purchase the contract of veteran relief pitcher Ron Taylor from the Houston Astros.
- February 16 – Right-hander Red Ruffing, who won 231 games (and went 7–2 in seven World Series, winning six rings) over 15 seasons as a Yankee, is elected to the Hall of Fame by the Baseball Writers' Association of America via a special runoff, since no candidate received the required 75 percent vote in January. In the runoff, Ruffing, 61, secures 266 votes to surpass former slugger Joe Medwick (248) and catcher Roy Campanella (170).
- February 23 – Hank Aaron of the Atlanta Braves joins the six-figure club, signing a two-year contract that will pay him $100,000 a season. A 13-year veteran, Aaron, 33, owns a .317 lifetime batting average and has slugged 442 homers so far.

=== March ===
- March 1:
  - Commissioner of Baseball William Eckert approves a proposal by the Baseball Writers' Association of America that the annual Cy Young Award, given since 1956 to a single pitcher in MLB regardless of league, be separated into American League and National League awards. Recently retired Sandy Koufax won the all-MLB CYA three times in those 11 years.
  - Chicago Cubs manager Leo Durocher names future Hall of Famer Ernie Banks, 36, a player-coach and announces that "Mr. Cub" must compete for his starting first-base job with John Boccabella, a 25-year-old. Banks will respond to the slight by averaging 152 games played between 1967 and 1969, slugging 78 home runs, making two All-Star squads, and placing in the top 14 in National League MVP voting three times in the next three seasons.
- March 21 – Spring training invitee Whitey Ford returns to the New York Yankees' roster, signing a 1967 contract for a reported $60,000. Ford, 38, a 234-game winner over his first 15 seasons with the Bombers, had been released at his own request last autumn after he underwent shoulder surgery.
- March 23 – Young Boston Red Sox first baseman George Scott, a future eight-time Gold Glove Award winner, knocks himself unconscious running into the right field wall chasing a fly ball during a spring training contest. The Red Sox' rookie manager, Dick Williams, who has been playing Scott in the outfield to improve his versatility, immediately announces an end to the experiment.
- March 27 – "The Dominican Dandy," Juan Marichal, ends a 29-day holdout by signing a $100,000 contract with the San Francisco Giants—a 33% raise over his 1966 salary of $75,000. Marichal, 29, compiled a 25–6 (2.23) record last season, and made his sixth NL All-Star team.

=== April ===
- April 1 – New York Mets general manager Bing Devine, on the job since last autumn, makes a five-player trade with his former team, acquiring pitcher Art Mahaffey and infielders Jerry Buchek and Tony Martínez from the St. Louis Cardinals for infielder Eddie Bressoud, outfielder Danny Napoleon and cash.
- April 2 – The Mets re-sign pitcher Ralph Terry, who had been released by them the previous November. Terry, 31, will appear in two early-season games then be released again on May 16, ending his MLB career.
- April 3 – The New York Yankees trade pitcher Jack Cullen, outfielder/first baseman John Miller and $25,000 to the Los Angeles Dodgers for third baseman John Kennedy. As part of the deal, the Yanks option young outfielder Roy White to the Dodgers' Spokane Indians Triple-A affiliate. White—who remains Yankee property—will bat .343 in 84 games with Spokane and be recalled to New York in mid-July.
- April 5 – Free-agent Dick Stuart, the first baseman known as much for his defensive incompetence as his slugging prowess, signs a two-year contract with the Taiyo Whales of Nippon Professional Baseball. Stuart, 34, had been released by the Dodgers last November 21. He will bash 33 homers in 125 games for the Whales in 1967.
- April 7:
  - Future Hall of Famer Robin Roberts, who won 234 games over his 14-year tenure with the Philadelphia Phillies (1948–1961), signs a free-agent contract with the Phils' Double-A Reading affiliate. Roberts, 40, had been released by the Chicago Cubs last October and is trying to return to the majors with his original team. He'll go 5–3 (2.48) with seven complete games in 11 starts for Reading in 1967, but won't be summoned back to Philadelphia.
  - The Detroit Tigers purchase the contract of rookie catcher Jim Price, 25, from the Pittsburgh Pirates. After spending five years as the Tigers' reserve backstop, he will eventually join their broadcast team and work for them from 1993 until his 2023 death.
- April 10:
  - Lyndon B. Johnson throws out the first pitch in the American League's traditional "Presidential Opener" at District of Columbia Stadium; the visiting New York Yankees score seven third-inning runs and Mel Stottlemyre allows only two hits to defeat the Washington Senators, 8–0.
  - The Cincinnati Reds defeat the new-look Los Angeles Dodgers, 6–1, at Crosley Field in the National League's traditional opener. The 1967 Dodgers are without the retired Sandy Koufax and the traded-away Maury Wills; Reds' fireballer Jim Maloney fans only one hitter but still yields just one run on five hits in seven innings of work.
  - The Philadelphia Phillies purchase the contract of first baseman/outfielder Tito Francona, 33, from the St. Louis Cardinals.

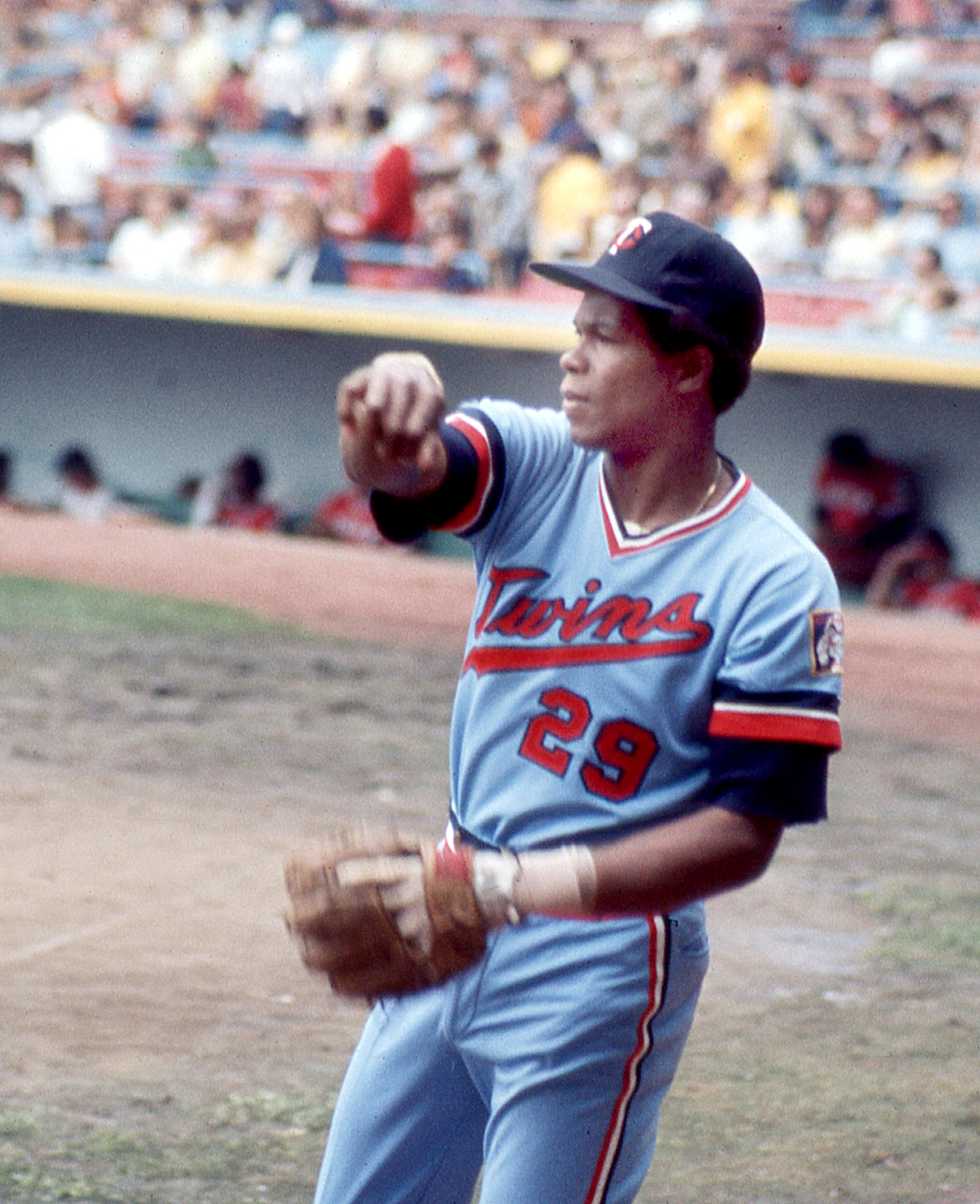
Rod Carew in 1975

- April 11:
  - Future Hall of Famer Rod Carew of the Minnesota Twins makes his MLB debut by singling in his first at bat off the Baltimore Orioles' Dave McNally at Memorial Stadium. Carew, now 21, will compile 3,053 hits over the course of his 19-season career.
  - In their season opener, the Chicago Cubs beat the Philadelphia Phillies 4–2 before 16,642 at Wrigley Field. Ferguson Jenkins tosses a complete game and Glenn Beckert hits a home run.
- April 14 – In his MLB debut, Billy Rohr of the Boston Red Sox has a no-hitter broken up with two out—and one strike to go—in the ninth inning a 3–0 victory over the New York Yankees and Whitey Ford at Yankee Stadium. A single by Elston Howard breaks up the bid, the only hit Rohr will allow. Exactly one week later, Rohr again defeats the Yankees in a complete game victory, this time at Fenway Park—the second of: 1) the only two games Rohr will win this season, and 2) the only three contests he will win as a major-leaguer.
- April 16:
  - At Busch Memorial Stadium, in the St. Louis Cardinals' fourth game of the season, Lou Brock hits two home runs in an 11–8 victory over the Houston Astros. With two homers against the Los Angeles Dodgers the day before and a fifth against the San Francisco Giants on Opening Day, Brock becomes the first player to hit five home runs in his team's first four games of the regular season.
  - Two marathon games mark American League play. In New York, the Boston Red Sox and the Yankees go 18 innings before Joe Pepitone's RBI single delivers a 7–6 victory for the Bombers. At Comiskey Park, Jerry Adair draws a bases-loaded walk in the 16th to seal a 4–3 triumph for his Chicago White Sox over the Washington Senators.
  - Three Kansas City Athletics pitchers—John "Blue Moon" Odom, Jim Nash and Lew Krausse—issue 14 bases on balls and hit two Detroit Tigers hitters over nine innings, helping the Tigers defeat the Athletics, 6–3, at Municipal Stadium.
- April 20 – Tom Seaver of the New York Mets earns his first major league victory, 6–1, over the visiting Chicago Cubs. It's the second start of his MLB career.
- April 21 – The Los Angeles Dodgers' run of 737 consecutive games without a game being rained out ends.
- April 25 – The Cubs acquire relief pitcher Dick Radatz from the Cleveland Indians for a player to be named later ("PTBNL"), minor-league outfielder Bob Raudman.
- April 30 – At Memorial Stadium, Steve Barber and Stu Miller combine for a no-hitter, but the Detroit Tigers score twice in the ninth on three bases on balls, a wild pitch, and an error (by rookie Mark Belanger, playing second base as a late-inning replacement) for a 2–1 win over the Baltimore Orioles. Barber walks ten men and throws two wild pitches in 82/3 innings and absorbs the defeat.
  - Two weeks earlier, in his first starting assignment of the year, Barber had a no-hitter broken up in the ninth inning by Jim Fregosi of the California Angels in a one-hit, 3–0 triumph at Anaheim Stadium.

=== May ===
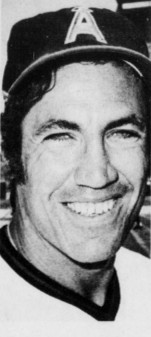
Mike Epstein in 1974

- May 8 – The Houston Astros sell the contract of veteran pitcher Turk Farrell to the Philadelphia Phillies. Now 33, Farrell returns to his original (1956–1961) MLB team, where he was a National League All-Star and a member of the "Dalton Gang," a group of high-living young Phillies known for late-night, curfew-challenging antics.
- May 10:
  - The New York Mets make two deals. They acquire veteran third baseman Ed Charles from the Kansas City Athletics for outfielder Larry Elliot and $50,000. Charles will be an important piece of the 1969 "Miracle Mets". In the second transaction, they purchase the contracts of pitcher John Miller and utilityman/pinch hitter Bob "Rocky" Johnson from the Baltimore Orioles.
  - Mike Epstein, the Orioles' rookie backup first baseman and The Sporting News' and Topps' 1966 Minor Year Player of the Year, refuses to return to Triple-A Rochester on option to gain more playing time. Instead, the heralded 23-year-old prospect goes on what The Sporting News describes as a "sit-down strike."
- May 12 – Jim Palmer faces the minimum of 27 hitters, issues no walks, and allows only a seventh-inning single to Horace Clarke in Baltimore's 14–0 thrashing of the Yankees in the Bronx. Clarke is promptly erased on Tom Tresh's 4–6–3 double play grounder. Palmer's near-perfect-game is tempered by the 21-year-old pitcher's ailing shoulder; he's throwing only 80 mph and "on my way to tearing my rotator cuff." Palmer will make only 21 appearances, 17 of them in the minors, during the rest of 1967 and all of 1968, rehabbing his shoulder without surgery before returning to the Orioles' rotation in April 1969.
- May 14 – The New York Yankees' Mickey Mantle becomes the sixth member of the 500-home run club in New York's 6–5 victory over Baltimore at Yankee Stadium. Mantle connects while batting left-handed off Stu Miller.
- May 16 – Carl Yastrzemski hits his 100th career home run in an 8–5 Boston Red Sox loss to the Orioles at Fenway Park.
- May 20 – Adolfo Phillips knocks in five runs and Randy Hundley five, leading the Chicago Cubs to a 20–3 hiding of the Los Angeles Dodgers at Wrigley Field. The 20 runs are the most scored by a team in an MLB game this year.
- May 29 – Mike Epstein's sit-down strike ends after 19 days when the Orioles trade him to the Washington Senators with left-handed pitcher Frank Bertaina for southpaw Pete Richert. Epstein becomes Washington's regular first baseman.
- May 30 – New York Yankees pitcher Whitey Ford announces his retirement after 16 MLB seasons, all of them with the Yankees. He'll be inducted into the Baseball Hall of Fame in his second year of eligibility in 1974 alongside his longtime teammate Mickey Mantle.

=== June ===
- June 2 – The Boston Red Sox acquire veteran infielder Jerry Adair from the Chicago White Sox for relief pitcher Don McMahon and minor-league hurler Rob Snow. Adair will fill in at third base, shortstop and second base and bat .291 in 89 games, proving vital to the Red Sox during the pennant drive.
- June 4:
  - The Washington Senators and Baltimore Orioles battle into the 19th inning before Oriole catcher Andy Etchebarren barrels a two-run, walk-off home run to give Baltimore a 7–5 triumph.
  - The surprising Boston Red Sox, who are 24–22 and hanging close to the American League leaders, add starting pitching, obtaining right-hander Gary Bell from the Cleveland Indians for young first baseman Tony Horton and outfielder Don Demeter.
- June 5 – The Atlanta Braves acquire veteran backup catcher Bob Uecker from the Philadelphia Phillies for catcher/first baseman Gene Oliver. Uecker, 33, is in the process of batting .150 in 80 total games during his sixth and final MLB campaign.
- June 6 – The third annual June amateur draft sees future Hall-of-Fame catcher Ted Simmons chosen in the first round, tenth overall, by the St. Louis Cardinals. Pitcher Jon Matlack (New York Mets) and infielder Bobby Grich (Baltimore Orioles) are also notable selections in the opening round, while Don Baylor (Orioles) and Vida Blue (Kansas City Athletics) are picked in Round 2.
- June 7 – Willie Stargell hits his 100th career home run helping Pittsburgh Pirates beat New York Mets 3–0.
- June 9:
  - Less than two years removed from leading the Minnesota Twins to the 1965 American League pennant, Sam Mele is replaced by veteran minor-league manager Cal Ermer as Minnesota's pilot. Mele had posted a 524–436 (.546) mark since June 1961. Under Ermer, the slow-starting, 25–25 Twins will rebound to join a furious, four-team 1967 pennant race that isn't decided until the final day of the regular season.
  - In the top of the fifth inning of the second game of a twi-night doubleheader at Kansas City's Municipal Stadium, the Athletics' 21-year-old rookie and top prospect Reggie Jackson enters his first MLB contest playing right field in place of Mike Hershberger. In the bottom of the frame, in his first big-league at bat, Jackson triples off the Cleveland Indians' Orlando Peña. Kansas City sweeps the twin bill, 2–0 and 6–0.
  - In a cash transaction, the Athletics reacquire 25-year-old first baseman Ken Harrelson from the Washington Senators. Back with his original team, Harrelson will come alive at the plate, hitting .305 in 61 games into mid-August.
- June 10 – The New York Mets trade journeyman right-hander Jack Hamilton to the California Angels for southpaw Nick Willhite.
- June 11 – At Wrigley Field, the Chicago Cubs pound the Mets 18–10 in a contest that features 11 home runs between the two teams. The Cubs' Adolfo Phillips slugs three homers, and Randy Hundley adds two.
- June 12 – MLB's longest game of 1967 takes place at District of Columbia Stadium, when the Washington Senators down the Chicago White Sox, 6–5, in 22 innings (and after six hours, 38 minutes). Paul Casanova, hitless in eight previous at bats, authors the game-winning RBI single.
- June 15 – At the Astrodome, Jimmy Wynn becomes the first Houston Astro to hit three home runs in one game. The shots, all with the bases empty, come in the fourth, sixth and eighth innings of the Astros' 6–2 victory over the San Francisco Giants.
- June 17 – It takes 19 innings for the Detroit Tigers and visiting Kansas City Athletics to settle matters in the second game of a Saturday doubleheader. Kansas City catcher Dave Duncan, later known as an influential, longtime pitching coach, homers off Detroit's Mike Marshall in the top of the 19th, then left-hander Bill Edgerton holds Detroit scoreless in the bottom half to give the Athletics a 6–5 win and a split of the twin bill. It's Edgerton's only MLB victory.
- June 18 – At the Astrodome, Don Wilson of the Houston Astros no-hits the Atlanta Braves 2–0, the first no-hitter ever pitched either in a domed stadium or on artificial turf. Along the way, he records 15 strikeouts, including Hank Aaron for the final out.

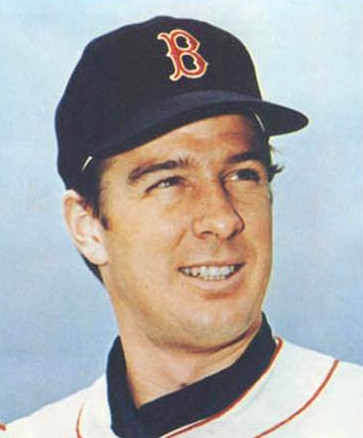
Jim Lonborg

- June 21 – At Yankee Stadium, the Yanks' Thad Tillotson sparks a beanball war with the Boston Red Sox' Jim Lonborg. In the second inning, Tillotson hits Bosox third baseman Joe Foy in the batting helmet with a fastball; Foy had slugged a grand slam the night before. When Tillotson comes to bat, Lonborg, a Stanford University alumnus known as "Gentleman Jim," throws a fastball that hits the Bombers' hurler between the shoulder blades, and the benches empty. Joe Pepitone injures his left wrist in the melee, but no one is ejected. The brushback pitches continue from both sides, culminating in the fifth when Lonborg hits Yankee pinch-hitter Dick Howser in the helmet with a fastball—the last shot fired in today's duel. The Red Sox win 8–1, the incident is cited as galvanizing the Bosox into a pennant contender, and Lonborg (who'll lead American League moundsmen in hit batsmen) wins 22 games and captures the 1967 AL Cy Young Award.
- June 27 – Trying to break up a double play, the Baltimore Orioles' Frank Robinson slides hard into Chicago White Sox second baseman Al Weis. Robinson's head collides violently with Weis' knee, and the reigning AL MVP, batting .337 with 21 home runs so far in 1967, is knocked unconscious from a concussion; he misses over a month of action. Weis, meanwhile, limps from the field and undergoes season-ending knee surgery. The Orioles, already a disappointing 32–36, fall further out of contention during Robinson's absence and well short of defending their 1966 world championship.

=== July ===
- July 2 – The surprising Chicago Cubs move into a tie for first place with the St. Louis Cardinals by defeating the Cincinnati Reds 4–1 before 40,464 at Wrigley Field. After the game, many in the crowd wait until the flags of the ten National League teams flying over the scoreboard are rearranged to show the Cubs' flag at the top. It's the first time the Cubs are in first place this late in a season since 1945, when they won the NL title.
- July 4:
  - The Niekro brothers face each other for the first time, with Phil Niekro pitching for the homestanding Atlanta Braves and Joe Niekro hurling for the Cubs. Phil beats Joe, 8–3, in the first game of a double-header. The Braves also take the second game, 4–2.
  - At the MLB season's "traditional" half-way point, the St. Louis Cardinals (46–30) and Chicago Cubs (46–31) are still neck-and-neck in the National League pennant race, with the slumping Cincinnati Reds (44–36) now four games back; Cincinnati had set the NL pace until falling into a funk in mid-June. It's a good year for baseball in the "Windy City," because, in the American League, the Chicago White Sox (44–30) stand three games in front of the Minnesota Twins (42–34) and 3½ ahead of the Detroit Tigers (41–34).
- July 11 – At Anaheim Stadium, Tony Pérez decides the longest All-Star Game (15 innings, three hours and 41 minutes) with a home run off Catfish Hunter in a 2–1 National League victory over the American League. Solo homers by Richie Allen and the AL's Brooks Robinson account for the other runs, as Pérez is named MVP.
- July 14 – Future Hall of Famer Eddie Mathews, now with the Houston Astros, becomes the seventh member of the 500 home run club. Juan Marichal of the San Francisco Giants, also a future Hall of Famer, serves up the "gopher ball".

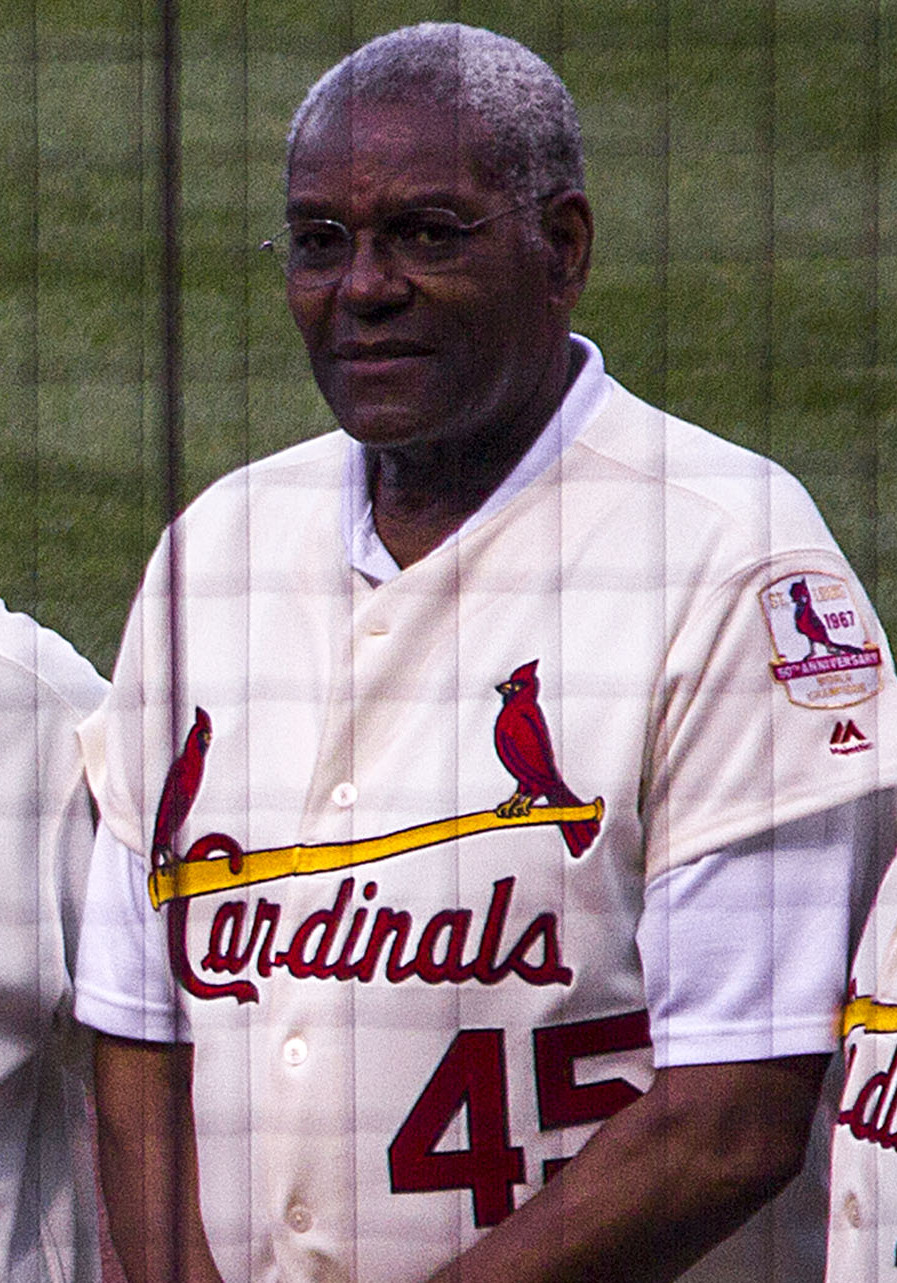
Bob Gibson in 2017

- July 15 – In a battle between two other future Baseball Hall of Famers, a line drive off the bat of the Pittsburgh Pirates' Roberto Clemente breaks the right fibula of St. Louis Cardinals' pitcher Bob Gibson in the fourth inning of a game at Busch Memorial Stadium. After a visit from the team trainer, Gibson doesn't leave the game immediately; he faces three more batters before collapsing in pain. Gibson misses almost eight weeks of the season before returning to the mound September 7. He will make four more September starts, as the Cardinals run away with the National League race. Then, in the 1967 World Series, he dominates the Boston Red Sox with three complete game triumphs to give St. Louis a seven-game Series championship.
- July 18 – The disappointing Pirates, expected to contend for the NL pennant but sitting at 42–42 and in sixth place, fire skipper Harry Walker and replace him with former Buc manager Danny Murtaugh. In the second of what will be four separate terms as the Pirates' manager, Murtaugh leads them to a 39–39 mark in 1967, then returns to the front office.
- July 22 – The Chicago White Sox, their American League lead dwindling, move to add offensive punch by acquiring veteran third baseman Ken Boyer, 36, the 1964 National League MVP, from the New York Mets, for minor league third baseman Bill Southworth. The four-player trade includes two "PTBNLs," with the White Sox also acquiring infielder Sandy Alomar Sr. on August 15, then completing the transaction on November 27 by sending backup catcher J. C. Martin to the Mets.
- July 23:
  - The red-hot Boston Red Sox win their ninth and tenth consecutive games by sweeping a doubleheader from the Indians at Cleveland Stadium, jumping into pennant contention. When their flight to Boston lands that night at Logan International Airport, the Red Sox are greeted by an estimated 10,000 fans. On April 12, only 8,324 had attended their Opening Day game at Fenway Park.
  - With the California Angels also in the midst of a seven-game winning streak, the American League race is now a five-headed affair at the end of today's action. Only 3½ games now separate the top five AL teams: in order, the White Sox (53–40), Red Sox (52–40), Angels (53–44), Tigers (50–43) and Twins (49–43).
- July 25 – The Chicago Cubs lose 4–3 to the St. Louis Cardinals at Busch Memorial Stadium in a battle between two teams deadlocked at the top of the National League standings. Veteran Ray Washburn goes eight strong innings for the victory. The Cardinals (now 57–40) take, and will hold onto, undisputed possession of first place; the Cubs (56–41) ultimately finish third, 14 games behind. Nevertheless, with 87 victories in 161 games, 1967 stands as their most successful season since 1945.
- July 29 – The Chicago White Sox trade for more right-handed power, acquiring Rocky Colavito from the Cleveland Indians for fellow veteran outfielder Jim King and a "PTBNL" (infielder Marv Staehle).

=== August ===
- August 2 – The Boston Red Sox obtain catcher Elston Howard from the New York Yankees for cash and two players to be named later, young pitchers Ron Klimkowski and Pete Magrini. The 38-year-old Howard will play a part in the Red Sox winning the 1967 American League pennant.
- August 8 – Johnny Callison's two-out single in the tenth inning scores John Briggs from third base and gives the Philadelphia Phillies a 5–4 win over the San Francisco Giants, extending the Phillies' winning streak to eight, their longest since 1963. Nevertheless, they remain in sixth place in the National League, ten full games behind the runaway St. Louis Cardinals.
- August 9 – In 20 innings at Metropolitan Stadium, the Washington Senators outlast the Minnesota Twins 9–7. Two relievers, one from each side, Darold Knowles (10 innings) and Al Worthington (82/3), turn in shutout performances, and Ken McMullen's homer breaks the deadlock. The win brings the seven-year-old expansion Senators to .500 after 110 games—their best later-season showing so far in their history. Every defeat will be costly for Minnesota, which will miss out on a pennant by a single game in October.
- August 11 – Joe Torre's 16th-inning homer enables the Atlanta Braves to "walk off" with a 6–5 triumph over the visiting Houston Astros.
- August 13 – With their 3–2 victory today, the Minnesota Twins complete a three-game series sweep over the visiting Chicago White Sox and replace the ChiSox at the top of the American League leader board. Feisty White Sox manager Eddie Stanky is ejected in the ninth inning after Tommie Agee is called out at third base trying to stretch a double. In the airtight AL race, only three games separate the top five teams.
- August 17 – The Detroit Tigers, three lengths behind in the AL derby, add left-handed punch by acquiring future Hall-of-Fame slugger Eddie Mathews from the Houston Astros for two "PTBNLs," pitchers Fred Gladding and Leo Marentette.

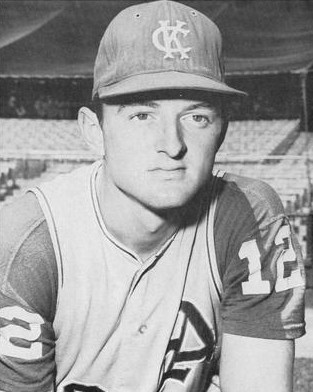
Ken Harrelson in 1965

- August 18:
  - Tony Conigliaro of the Boston Red Sox is beaned by the California Angels' Jack Hamilton. Hit on the left cheekbone, just below the eye socket, Conigliaro will miss the rest of 1967 and all of 1968. He was hitting .287 with 20 home runs and 67 RBIs in 95 games in 1967, and had been selected an American League All-Star. Despite the loss of "Tony C", the Red Sox will sweep the four-game series with the Angels. The four losses extend the Halos' losing streak to seven games, effectively knocking them out of the pennant race, and leaves the Minnesota Twins in first place, with Boston, the Detroit Tigers and the Chicago White Sox all within two games.
  - Kansas City Athletics owner Charles O. Finley suspends pitcher Lew Krausse for alleged misconduct on an early-August team flight. Today's suspension kicks off a chain reaction of events: Krausse's teammates formally and publicly protest Finley's decision (August 19); Finley fires manager Alvin Dark for failing to fully back the suspension (August 22); then he releases hard-hitting first baseman and Dark supporter Ken Harrelson for calling the owner "a menace to baseball" (August 25). Meanwhile, batting coach Luke Appling, the Hall-of-Fame former shortstop, takes over the managerial reins of the last-place Athletics.
- August 20 – In the first game of a doubleheader, Al Kaline hits his 300th career home run and helps the Detroit Tigers beat the Cleveland Indians, 4–2. Kaline slugs another home run in the second game and Detroit wins, 4–0.
- August 22 – The Tigers sweep another twin bill at their home ballpark—this time against fellow contenders, the Minnesota Twins, 7–3 and 2–1 (11 innings). The nightcap is decided when second baseman Dick McAuliffe triples and scores on a wild pitch. One game now separates the American League's four top teams, with the Chicago White Sox (68–53, .562) and Boston Red Sox (69–54, .561) virtually tied for first, and the Twins (67–54, .554) and Tigers (68–55, .553) virtually tied for third.
- August 23 – The visiting California Angels lash 25 hits, most in the majors this season, in defeating the Cleveland Indians, 16–5. Jim Fregosi and Hawk Taylor each ring up four hits.
- August 25 – Minnesota Twins pitcher Dean Chance no-hits the Indians 2–1 at Cleveland Stadium. He walks five and fans eight. Nineteen days earlier, Chance had thrown five perfect innings against the Red Sox to defeat Boston 2–0 in a game shortened by rain.
- August 27 – Rocky Colavito's bases-loaded walk in the 11th inning drives in the game's only run, as the Chicago White Sox gain a split of their doubleheader with the Red Sox, 1–0, at Comiskey Park. In Game 1, an unexpectedly strong throw from right fielder José Tartabull cuts down Ken Berry at home plate in the bottom of the ninth to preserve a 9–8 Boston victory.
- August 28:
  - The Philadelphia Phillies rise to a virtual tie for second place in the National League after another winning streak—eight straight games—with a 3-2 win over the Cincinnati Reds. The Phillies capture 21 of their last 29 games in 1967 to finish with 82 wins, their last winning season until 1975.
  - After a three-day bidding war for his services, free agent Ken Harrelson signs a $75,000 contract to join the contending Boston Red Sox—a 600 percent salary increase from his pre-August 25 annual salary. Boston will plug Harrelson into Tony Conigliaro's right field position during the pennant drive.
- August 29 – The first-place Red Sox and ninth-place Yankees play another marathon tilt at Yankee Stadium: a 20-inning affair won by the Yankees 4–3 to split a Tuesday twi-night doubleheader. Future author Jim Bouton goes five shutout innings to gain the win.

=== September ===
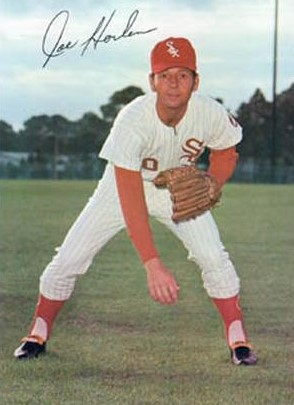
Joe Horlen in 1971

- September 1 – Gaylord Perry of the San Francisco Giants throws 16 shutout innings against the Cincinnati Reds at Crosley Field before he turns the scoreless tie over to bullpen ace Frank Linzy. Goose-eggs dot the scoreboard until the top of the 21st, when Giants veteran Dick Groat coaxes a bases-loaded walk off the Reds' Bob Lee that enables the eventual winning run (and only tally of the contest) to score. It's the National League's longest game (by innings) of the season.
- September 4 – With all the Labor Day action in the books, only 1½ games separate the four American League contenders: the Minnesota Twins hold first by a half-game over the Boston Red Sox, one full game over the Chicago White Sox and 1½ contests over the Detroit Tigers. In the National League, the St. Louis Cardinals boast a comfortable margin of 10½ lengths over the second-place Chicago Cubs.
- September 6 – For the first time in the AL's hectic pennant scramble, all four contenders are tied (or virtually tied with only .001 separating them) for first place in the standings.
- September 7 – St. Louis Cardinals ace starting pitcher Bob Gibson returns to action, going five innings and allowing two earned runs in a 9–2 romp over the New York Mets. Gibson, on the injured list since mid-July when a line drive broke his right fibula, improves to 11–6 on the season. Veteran Jack Lamabe saves the win with 32/3 innings of one-hit relief.
- September 10:
  - Joe Horlen of the Chicago White Sox no-hits the Detroit Tigers 6–0, in the first game of a doubleheader at Comiskey Park; he allows two baserunners (on a hit batsman and an error by Ken Boyer) and strikes out four. The White Sox also shut out the Tigers in the nightcap, with Cisco Carlos gaining his first major league victory, to pull into a third-place tie with Detroit and within 1½ games of the first-place Minnesota Twins.
  - Gaylord Perry of the San Francisco Giants extends his consecutive scoreless innings pitched streak to 40 before he surrenders an unearned run in the seventh frame of a 2–1 victory over the Chicago Cubs at Candlestick Park. Perry himself commits the error that leads to the Chicago tally. Perry's scoreless streak began August 28; his victory is his 13th against 15 defeats.
- September 12 – The Cincinnati Reds sign infielder Dave Concepción as an international free agent.
- September 14 – The days of the Athletics' residency in Kansas City appear numbered when owner Charles O. Finley notifies the city manager in writing that he won't renew his lease on Municipal Stadium when it expires in October. Voters in the Missouri city have recently approved a bond issue that would finance the building of a new 45,000-seat baseball park.
- September 17 – At Comiskey Park, veteran Rocky Colavito delivers another extra-innings win for the White Sox when his RBI single drives in the game's only run in a 17-inning, 1–0 victory over Colavito's former club, the Cleveland Indians. The win enables the fourth-place Pale Hose to keep pace in the AL race.
- September 18:
  - The St. Louis Cardinals clinch their 11th National League pennant and their second in four seasons behind Bob Gibson's three-hit, complete-game 5–1 triumph over the Philadelphia Phillies at Connie Mack Stadium. Julián Javier drives in Lou Brock with the game-winning hit during St. Louis's four-run, sixth-inning uprising. The 95–56 Cardinals have gone 39–16 since they were tied for first with the Chicago Cubs on July 24.
  - At Tiger Stadium, late-inning solo homers by Carl Yastrzemski (in the ninth) and Dalton Jones (in the tenth) deliver a come-from-behind, 6–5 victory for the Boston Red Sox over host Detroit. Yastrzemski's home run is his 40th of the year. Boston pulls into a flat-footed, first-place tie with the Tigers; both clubs are 85–66. Denny McLain, the Tigers' starting pitcher tonight, earns a no-decision. He leaves the game in the third inning with the contest tied 3–3, no outs, and two men on base. His line on the night: two innings pitched, four hits, two bases on balls, and four earned runs allowed.
    - Some time after the game ends, McLain, who has won 17 games (and lost 16) so far in 1967, suffers a mysterious, season-ending foot injury. Sports Illustrated will allege over two years later that McLain, a compulsive gambler, sustained the injury when a mob enforcer stomped on his foot as punishment for not paying back a $45,600 gambling debt.
- September 20:
  - Steve Carlton, the Cardinals' 22-year-old southpaw, strikes out 16 Philadelphia Phillies in eight innings, but drops a 3–1 decision.
  - Wes Westrum resigns as manager of the last-place New York Mets with 11 games remaining in the regular season. The second manager in franchise history, Westrum posted a 142–237 (.375) record since he succeeded Casey Stengel on July 25, 1965.
- September 27:
  - In the tight AL pennant race, the possibility of a four-way tie is eliminated as the Minnesota Twins and Boston Red Sox both lose (5–1 to California and 6–0 to Cleveland, respectively). Minnesota now has a 91–69 won-lost record and Boston is 90–70, and the only games left for those two teams are two games against each other.
  - In what will be their last-ever home games in Kansas City, the last-place Athletics sweep the contending Chicago White Sox in a twinight doubleheader, 5–2 and 4–0; the two defeats ignite a five-game, end-of-season losing streak that wrecks the ChiSox' pennant chances.
- September 28 – The Atlanta Braves fire second-year manager Billy Hitchcock with three games remaining in the 1967 campaign. He is succeeded during the offseason by Lum Harris, skipper of Triple-A Richmond and a close associate of new general manager Paul Richards.
- September 29:
  - The White Sox lose 1–0 to the Washington Senators and are eliminated from the AL pennant race. Chicago, now 89–71, can win a maximum of 91 games, and must finish behind the Twins or the Red Sox. The only remaining tie possibilities are Twins–Tigers or Red Sox–Tigers.
  - Ferguson Jenkins of the Chicago Cubs wins his 20th game of 1967 with a 4–1 decision over the Reds in Cincinnati. It's the first of seven 20-win seasons for Jenkins in his Hall-of-Fame career, six of which come with the Cubs.

=== October ===
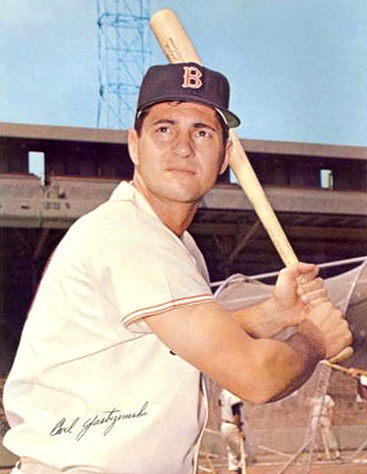
Carl Yastrzemski

- October 1:
  - One of the closest major league pennant races ever enters the season's final day with the Boston Red Sox and Minnesota Twins tied for first place and the Detroit Tigers one-half game back in the American League. At Fenway Park, the Red Sox and Twins play each other, with the winner clinching a tie for the pennant and the loser eliminated. Eventual AL MVP Carl Yastrzemski goes four for four as the Red Sox beat the Twins 5–3. In the season's final two games, Yastrzemski goes seven for eight, with a home run (his 44th) and six RBI (winning the Triple Crown in the process), and makes a key outfield assist on defense.
  - The Tigers can tie if they sweep a doubleheader from the California Angels in Detroit. The Bengals win the first game 6–4, but their bullpen fails in the finale and the Angels win, 8–5, to give the Red Sox the pennant with no playoff. The Bosox, ninth-place finishers in 1966, win their first American League championship since 1946 and eighth AL flag overall.
  - For the first time since 1937 both Chicago teams win at least 85 games during the regular season. For the Cubs it's only their second above-.500 season since 1946.
  - In the Minnesota Twins' loss today, their third baseman, César Tovar, sets an AL season record by playing in 164 games. Maury Wills holds the NL record at 165 (1962).
- October 2:
  - Alvin Dark, fired by the Kansas City Athletics on August 22, signs a two-year contract as manager of the Cleveland Indians, replacing Joe Adcock.
  - Former NL MVP (1960) Dick Groat, now 37 and playing for the San Francisco Giants, announces his retirement after 14 seasons and 1,929 games played.
- October 5 – In Game 2 of the 1967 World Series, Boston's Jim Lonborg is brilliant as he retires the first 19 St. Louis Cardinals before walking Curt Flood with one out in the seventh inning. His no-hit bid is broken up with two out in the eighth by a Julián Javier double. Lonborg has to settle for pitching the fourth one-hitter in World Series history as the Red Sox even the series with a 5–0 win.
- October 6 – Catcher Bob Uecker is released by the Atlanta Braves.
- October 8 – The Atlanta Braves trade left-hander Denny Lemaster, a 1967 NL All-Star, and starting shortstop Denis Menke to the Houston Astros for Houston's shortstop, Sonny Jackson, and first baseman Chuck Harrison.
- October 9 – In Game 5 of the World Series, Jim Lonborg follows his Game 2, one-hit complete game shutout by holding the Cardinals scoreless on two hits over eight innings at Busch Memorial Stadium. Roger Maris finally solves Lonborg via a ninth-inning solo homer, but the Red Sox climb back into the Series with a 3–1 win to send it back to Boston. Lonborg's line over two starts: 18 IP, one run and four hits allowed, a 2–0 record, two complete games, and 0.50 ERA.
- October 10 – The Cincinnati Reds trade former starting first baseman Deron Johnson to the Atlanta Braves for pitcher Jay Ritchie and outfielders Mack Jones and Jim Beauchamp.
- October 11 – Gil Hodges, the Brooklyn Dodgers' Hall-of-Fame first baseman of the 1950s, returns to New York City, his adopted home, as the third permanent manager in New York Mets' history. Because Hodges, 43, is still under contract to the Washington Senators, whom he has managed since May 23, 1963, compensation will be arranged during the interleague trading period that coincides with the winter meetings.
- October 12 – In Game 7 of the World Series, the St. Louis Cardinals earn their second world championship in four seasons with a 7–2 victory over pitcher Jim Lonborg, hurling on only two days' rest, and the Boston Red Sox. Bob Gibson, the Series MVP, notches his third win in the Series with a three-hitter; he records ten strikeouts and a fifth-inning home run, while outfielder Lou Brock has two hits and three stolen bases for a record seven steals in a seven-game World Series. Julián Javier's three-run, sixth-inning homer puts the game out of reach. It's the Cardinals' eighth World Series triumph in their history.
- October 13 – The Pittsburgh Pirates name Larry Shepard, 48, their manager for 1968. Shepard, a former minor-league pitcher, spent 14 seasons managing in the Pirates' farm system.
- October 14 – The Washington Senators name former two-time American League All-Star Jim Lemon, 39, to fill their managerial opening. Lemon is still popular in Washington as a slugging outfielder for the District's previous Senators franchise, now the Minnesota Twins.
- October 16 – The Chicago White Sox release Smoky Burgess, 40, a portly former catcher who has become one the era's top pinch-hitting specialists. Burgess retires with a career .295 average in 1,691 games over 18 seasons. A nine-time National League All-Star during his catching days, he also holds the MLB record for career pinch hits with 145, a mark broken by Manny Mota in 1979.
- October 18 – After 11 hours of deliberations and at least two ballots, American League owners approve the immediate transfer of Charlie Finley's Kansas City Athletics to Oakland, and conditionally award expansion franchises to Kansas City and Seattle to begin play "no later than 1971."
  - U.S. Senator Stuart Symington of Missouri, who attends the meeting, threatens to revoke baseball's antitrust exemption unless Major League Baseball continues in Kansas City "uninterrupted." To appease Symington and Kansas City's mayor, league president Joe Cronin announces early on October 19 that the Junior Circuit will accelerate expansion to 1969, split into two six-team divisions, and reduce its playing schedule to 156 games.
  - The Athletics abandon Kansas City after 13 consecutive losing seasons; they win only 40.4 percent of their games, never leave the AL's second division, and finish last five times.
  - For the next quarter century, the American League's invasion of the Bay Area will have serious implications for the NL's San Francisco Giants. Oakland's "Swingin' A's" dynasty of 1971–1975 will help drive owner Horace Stoneham out of baseball by 1976; the Giants barely avert a sale to Canadian investors and move to Toronto. Then, after Finley's barebones Oakland regime is replaced by the Haas family's ownership in the 1980s, the Athletics' on-field and marketing success—combined with the obsolescence of the Giants' Candlestick Park—almost forces another sale and franchise transfer, this time to Tampa–Saint Petersburg, in 1992.
- October 22 – Charlie Finley hires Hall of Famer and Bay Area legend Joe DiMaggio as a vice president of his newly re-christened Oakland Athletics. DiMaggio will also don a green-and-gold uniform and serve as batting coach for the transplanted team. The "Yankee Clipper," 53, needs two more years of baseball service to qualify for the league's maximum pension allowance.
  - Two days earlier, in a less publicized but more significant hiring, Finley had appointed Bob Kennedy, 47, Oakland's first-ever MLB field manager. Kennedy, a former AL outfielder and third baseman, posted a 182–198 record as "head coach" of the Chicago Cubs from Opening Day 1963 through June 13, 1965. He will become the Athletics' eighth manager since Finley bought the team prior to the 1961 season.
- October 25 – The Houston Astros sign outfielder César Cedeño, 16, as an international free agent.
- October 30 – The Chicago White Sox, who drew only 985,634 fans to Comiskey Park despite a season of pennant contention in 1967, announce they will play nine night games, one against each American League foe, at Milwaukee County Stadium in 1968. Bud Selig, a 33-year-old Milwaukee automobile dealer, helps facilitate the arrangement; he intends to show that his city, which lost the Braves to Atlanta in 1966, remains hungry for baseball.

=== November ===
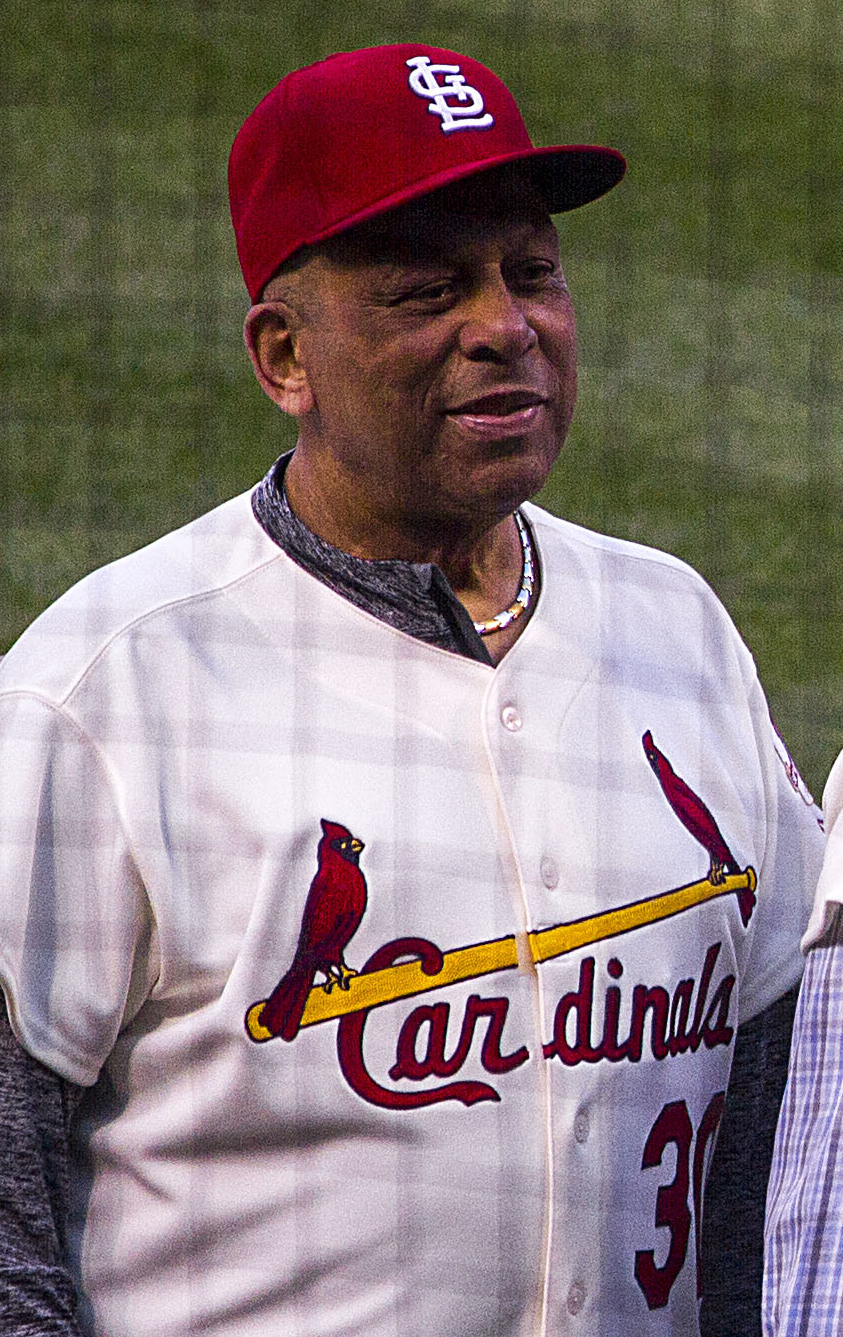
Orlando Cepeda in 2017

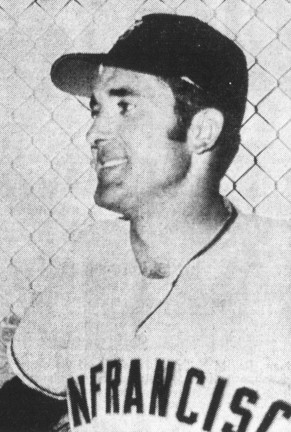
Mike McCormick in 1969

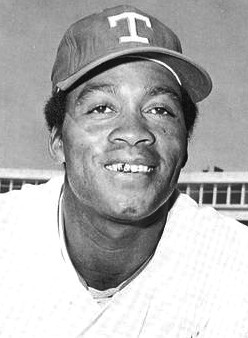
César Tovar in 1974

- November 1 – Mike McCormick, former bonus baby and 1960 National League earned run average leader, is elected winner of the 1967 NL Cy Young Award. McCormick, 29, compiled a 22–10 (2.85) record with 14 complete games and five shutouts, in the first season of his second term with the San Francisco Giants. He captures 18 of 20 possible first-place votes (Ferguson Jenkins and Jim Bunning each garnering one) to take the first league-specific "Cy".
  - On November 3, Jim Lonborg, 22-game-winner of the American League champion Boston Red Sox, breezes to the first AL-only Cy Young Award. Like McCormick, he collects 18 first-place votes (90%), with Joe Horlen, who tops two ballots, placing second.
- November 7 – Orlando Cepeda (20 votes, 280 points) is the unanimous choice for the NL Most Valuable Player Award. Known to his teammates as "Cha Cha," Cepeda is the on- and off-field leader of the world-champion Cardinals, whom Cepeda nicknames El Birdos. He's the first unanimous NL MVP since 1936 (Carl Hubbell).
- November 8 – The New York Mets acquire outfielder Art Shamsky from the Cincinnati Reds for utility infielder Bob "Rocky" Johnson. Shamsky will be a key figure on the 1969 "Miracle Mets", batting .300 in 100 regular-season games and .538 in the Mets' 1969 NLCS sweep.
- November 13 – Deriding the American League's 1969 plan to expand to Seattle and Kansas City and adopt divisional play as "half-cocked," NL president Warren Giles vows that the Senior Circuit won't be rushed into such a hasty decision; he denies that his league also coveted the Seattle territory and says NL owners will not consider expansion until the winter meetings convene later this month—at the earliest. Seven cities, Giles reveals, have already submitted informal bids for expansion franchises.
- November 15 – Capturing all but one first-place vote (and 275 points), Triple-Crown-winner Carl Yastrzemski is a near-unanimous choice for the 1967 AL Most Valuable Player Award. Minneapolis baseball writer Max Nichols' strongly criticized vote for hometown player César Tovar is the lone dissenting tally. Tovar collects only 70 points in all and finishes tied for seventh; his teammate Harmon Killebrew is Yaz' official runner-up, with no first-place votes but 161 total points.
- November 20:
  - Tom Seaver of the New York Mets wins the 1967 National League Rookie of the Year Award. With 11 first-place votes, he outdistances fellow pitchers Gary Nolan and Dick Hughes. Seaver becomes the first "ROTY" to come from a last-place team.
  - The Minnesota Twins release stalwart veteran catcher Earl Battey, a five-time American League All-Star. Until he was slowed by injuries, Battey, 32, was the franchise's first-string receiver for seven seasons.
- November 21 – Ohio's big-league clubs make an interleague trade when the Cleveland Indians obtain outfielder Tommy Harper from the Cincinnati Reds for pitcher George Culver, first baseman Fred Whitfield and outfielder Bob Raudman.
- November 22 – Minnesota Twins second baseman Rod Carew wins the AL Rookie of the Year Award. Receiving 19 of 20 first place votes, Carew easily surpasses Reggie Smith of the Boston Red Sox.
- November 27 – The New York Mets trade pitcher Bill Denehy and $100,000 to the Washington Senators for Washington's ex-manager, Gil Hodges, who on October 11 became the third permanent skipper in the Mets' seven-year history. The former Brooklyn Dodgers great and eventual Hall of Famer will lead the 1969 "Miracle Mets" to the world championship.
- November 28 – Foes in the seven-game 1965 World Series, the Los Angeles Dodgers and Minnesota Twins collaborate for a five-player interleague trade. The Dodgers send pitchers Bob Miller and Ron Perranoski and longtime starting catcher John Roseboro to the Twins for pitcher Mudcat Grant and shortstop Zoilo Versalles, who had been the 1965 AL MVP.
- November 29:
  - The Chicago White Sox reacquire Hall-of-Fame shortstop Luis Aparicio, along with outfielder Russ Snyder and outfielder/first baseman John Matias, from the Baltimore Orioles in exchange for pitchers Bruce Howard and Roger Nelson and infielder/outfielder Don Buford. Aparicio, 33, broke into MLB with the ChiSox in 1956 and led his league in stolen bases seven times, won five Gold Glove Awards, and made seven AL All-Star squads before his trade prior to the 1963 campaign. Today's deal opens the Baltimore shortstop job for slick-fielding Mark Belanger, 23, a future eight-time Gold Glove winner.
  - The Cleveland Indians and California Angels swap outfielders, with Chuck Hinton going to the Angels for José Cardenal.
- November 30:
  - The newly reenergized Major League Baseball Players Association charges that owners have snubbed executive director Marvin Miller and player representatives from all 20 teams after previously scheduling a meeting with them at the annual winter confab, held this year in Mexico City. Spokesmen for the owners deny that any such meeting had been on their agenda.
  - The Chicago Cubs trade right-hander Ray Culp to the Boston Red Sox for outfielder Rudy Schlesinger and second baseman Al Montreuil (PTBNL). Culp, 25, will average 16 victories a season for the Bosox between 1968 and 1971.
  - The Los Angeles Dodgers trade outfielder Lou Johnson to the Cubs for infielder Paul Popovich and outfielder Jim Williams.
  - The New York Yankees purchase utility infielder Gene "Stick" Michael, 29, from the Dodgers, beginning Michael's long association with the Bombers as a player, coach, scout, manager and executive.

=== December ===
- December 1:
  - The coming expansion of Major League Baseball gains steam when National League owners vote unanimously to add two teams no later than 1971. Seven cities are reported to be in the running: Buffalo, Dallas–Fort Worth, Denver, Milwaukee, Montréal, San Diego and Toronto.
  - The American League, which has advanced its expansion timetable to 1969, awards its Seattle franchise to William R. Daley, former owner of the Cleveland Indians, and brothers Dewey and Max Soriano.
- December 2 – The Pittsburgh Pirates acquire veteran right-hander Ron Kline, 35, from the Minnesota Twins for rookie outfielder Bob Oliver. It's Kline's second stint with the Pirates; he had broken in with a last-place Pittsburgh team in 1952, then led the National League in games lost in both 1956 and 1958. However, Kline will sparkle in 1968 coming out of the Bucs' bullpen (12–5, seven saves, 1.68 ERA).
- December 3 – The Pirates sell the contract of Jim Pagliaroni, their former starting catcher, to the Oakland Athletics.
- December 6 – Bing Devine returns to the St. Louis Cardinals as general manager, succeeding Stan Musial, who gives up baseball operations duties but remain associated with the team as a senior vice president. A major builder of the Redbirds' 1964 and 1967 world champions, Devine had been prematurely fired by owner Gussie Busch in mid-August 1964. He then spent three years with the New York Mets, including one as president/general manager, positioning them for their remarkable 1969 season. Johnny Murphy succeeds Devine as the Mets' front-office boss.
- December 7 – The Atlanta Braves trade minor-league third baseman Bobby Cox to the New York Yankees for pitcher Dale Roberts and catcher Bob Tillman. Ten years later, Cox will return to the Braves for his first term as their manager and kick off a Baseball Hall of Fame career as their dugout leader.
- December 15:
  - On the last day of the three-week interleague trading period then in force, the New York Mets trade pitchers Jack Fisher and Billy Wynne, catcher Buddy Booker and outfielder Tommy Davis to the Chicago White Sox for infielder Al Weis and centerfielder Tommie Agee. Both Weis and Agee will prove integral to the Mets' 1969 World Series championship.
  - The Philadelphia Phillies trade future Hall-of-Fame pitcher Jim Bunning, 36, to the Pittsburgh Pirates for left-hander Woodie Fryman and three minor-leaguers, one of whom is prized third base prospect Don Money, 20.
  - The American League champion Boston Red Sox acquire left-hander Dick Ellsworth and catcher/first baseman Gene Oliver from the Phillies for catcher Mike Ryan and cash.
- December 27 – The 1968 Red Sox' chances of repeating as AL pennant-winners take a serious blow when Cy Young Award recipient Jim Lonborg undergoes surgery to repair two torn ligaments in his left knee, suffered in a skiing accident in California on December 23. Lonborg, 25, who posted 24 victories this past season (including his two in the 1967 World Series), will develop arm miseries and win only 27 total games for the Bosox over the next four seasons.

== Births ==
=== January ===
- January 3 – Jimmy Rogers
- January 4
  - Ted Wood
  - Clint Zavaras
- January 5 – Chris Nabholz
- January 7 – Rob Maurer
- January 8
  - Matt Maysey
  - Randy Nosek
- January 10 – Kevin Baez
- January 11 – Nikco Riesgo
- January 12 – Mike Simms
- January 14 – Paul Fletcher
- January 15 – Bill Wertz
- January 22 – Kevin Higgins
- January 26 – Jeff Branson
- January 26 – Tim Pugh

=== February ===
- February 1
  - Juan Guerrero
  - Tim Naehring
  - Hiromoto Okubo
- February 9 – Todd Pratt
- February 11
  - John Patterson
  - Scott Pose
- February 13 – Eddie Pye
- February 17 – Lonnie Maclin
- February 18
  - John Valentin
  - Matt Turner
- February 19 – Keith Kessinger
- February 20 – Kurt Knudsen
- February 26
  - David Howard
  - Scott Service

=== March ===
- March 8
  - Lance Barksdale
  - Joel Johnston
- March 9 – Vince Horsman
- March 11 – Dwayne Hosey
- March 15 – Bobby Rose
- March 16 – Don Florence
- March 18 – Ken Edenfield
- March 23 – Jerry Brooks
- March 25 – Brian Barnes
- March 26
  - Jarvis Brown
  - Shawn Hare
- March 27
  - Jaime Navarro
  - Candy Sierra
- March 28
  - Shawn Boskie
  - Larry Gonzales
- March 29
  - Brian Jordan
  - Gerónimo Peña

=== April ===
- April 3
  - Miguel García
  - Danilo León
- April 5 – Greg Smith
- April 6 – Tommy Greene
- April 8 – Rich Batchelor
- April 9 – Graeme Lloyd
- April 10 – Mike Humphreys
- April 14 – Mike Trombley
- April 17 – Marquis Grissom
- April 18 – Brian Dubois
- April 20 – Greg Brummett
- April 23 – Rhéal Cormier
- April 24 – Omar Vizquel
- April 25 – Mike Sarbaugh
- April 27 – Tony Eusebio

=== May ===
- May 5 – Charles Nagy
- May 12 – Kenny Greer
- May 15 – John Smoltz
- May 16
  - Doug Brocail
  - Frank Seminara
- May 18 – Eric Young
- May 19 – Turk Wendell
- May 24 – Carlos Hernández
- May 26 – Stacy Jones
- May 29 – Bill Risley
- May 31
  - Kenny Lofton
  - Bill Miller

=== June ===
- June 1 – James Hurst
- June 2 – Mike Stanton
- June 4
  - Scott Servais
  - Rick Wilkins
- June 5 – Ray Lankford
- June 6 – Ken Ramos
- June 8 – Steve Chitren
- June 11 – John Doherty
- June 13 – Daren Brown
- June 14
  - Jerry Spradlin
  - George Tsamis
  - Brian Turang
- June 23 – Hensley Meulens
- June 27 – Lee Hancock
- June 28
  - Matt Karchner
  - Ron Witmeyer
- June 29 – John Wehner

=== July ===
- July 3 – Brian Cashman
- July 4 – Vinny Castilla
- July 5 – Tim Worrell
- July 6 – Omar Olivares
- July 10 – Lee Stevens
- July 11
  - Andy Ashby
  - Donne Wall
- July 13 – Pat Rapp
- July 14 – Robin Ventura
- July 21 – Lance Painter
- July 25 – Ed Sprague

=== August ===
- August 1 – Gregg Jefferies
- August 2 – Scott Taylor
- August 4 – Steve Bieser
- August 7 – Jason Grimsley
- August 8
  - Kevin Belcher
  - Matt Whiteside
- August 9 – Deion Sanders
- August 10 – Chuck Carr
- August 14 – Joe Grahe
- August 15 – Mike James
- August 16 – Bret Barberie
- August 17 – Kelly Mann
- August 19 – Scott Fredrickson
- August 20 – Andy Benes
- August 22 – Bill Welke
- August 25 – Euclides Rojas
- August 26 – Shinji Sasaoka
- August 27
  - Brian McRae
  - Willie Smith
- August 28 – Darren Lewis
- August 31 – Stan Royer

=== September ===
- September 2 – Jamie McAndrew
- September 3 – Luis González
- September 12 – Pat Listach
- September 13 – Rod Correia
- September 15
  - Paul Abbott
  - Dennis Moeller
- September 16 – John Ericks
- September 19 – Jim Abbott
- September 22
  - John Briscoe
  - P. J. Forbes
  - Matt Howard
  - Doug Lindsey
- September 26 – Brian Traxler
- September 29 – Dave Silvestri
- September 30
  - John DeSilva
  - Yorkis Pérez

=== October ===
- October 1 – Chuck McElroy
- October 3 – Junior Félix
- October 4 – Roger Pavlik
- October 5 – Rey Sánchez
- October 8 – J. T. Bruett
- October 9 – Jim Tatum
- October 12
  - Mike DiMuro
  - Ray DiMuro
- October 13
  - Scott Cooper
  - Monty Fariss
  - Trevor Hoffman
- October 14
  - Dave Hajek
  - Pat Kelly
- October 15 – Carlos García
- October 16 – Josías Manzanillo
- October 17 – Mark Johnson
- October 20 – Harvey Pulliam
- October 21 – John Flaherty
- October 24 – F. P. Santangelo
- October 25 – Joe Siddall
- October 26 – Rafael Novoa
- October 29
  - Narciso Elvira
  - Greg Gohr
  - Mandy Romero

=== November ===
- November 1 – Carlos Rodríguez
- November 4
  - Chris Bushing
  - Eric Karros
  - Jon Shave
  - Ryan Thompson
- November 5 – Brian Raabe
- November 7 – Dave Wainhouse
- November 8
  - Eric Anthony
  - Henry Rodríguez
- November 11
  - Jose Munoz
  - Noe Muñoz
- November 12
  - Donald Harris
  - Mark Small
- November 14 – Paul Wagner
- November 15 – Pedro Borbón
- November 18 – Tom Gordon
- November 19 – Gary DiSarcina
- November 20 – Alex Arias
- November 21
  - Darron Cox
  - Tripp Cromer
- November 24
  - Cal Eldred
  - Al Martin
  - Ben McDonald
- November 29 – Bob Hamelin

=== December ===
- December 1 – Reggie Sanders
- December 5 – Matt Grott
- December 6 – Kevin Appier
- December 7 – Tino Martínez
- December 8 – Tom McGraw
- December 13 – Mike Mordecai
- December 15 – Mo Vaughn
- December 17
  - Steve Parris
  - Rafael Valdez
- December 19 – Doug Johns
- December 26 – Esteban Beltré
- December 30
  - Archie Corbin
  - Tim Timmons

== Deaths ==
=== January ===
- January 1 – Lindsay Brown, 55, shortstop who appeared in 48 games for the 1937 Brooklyn Dodgers.
- January 4 – Estel Crabtree, 63, outfielder who appeared in 489 total games for the Cincinnati Reds (1929; 1931–1932; 1943–1944) and St. Louis Cardinals (1933; 1941–1942); stalwart member of 1930s Rochester Red Wings teams; elected to the International League Hall of Fame (1953).
- January 6
  - Joe Haynes, 49, pitcher who hurled in 379 career games for the Washington Senators and Chicago White Sox from 1939 through 1952; American League earned-run average champion (1947) and All-Star (1948); from 1953, a coach and executive with Washington and the Minnesota Twins; brother-in-law of Calvin Griffith.
  - Johnny Keane, 55, manager of the St. Louis Cardinals (July 6, 1961 through 1964) and New York Yankees (1965 to May 6, 1966) who won the 1964 World Series with the Cardinals, then joined the opposing Yankees immediately afterward; previously, longtime minor league infielder and manager before his promotion to Cardinals as a coach in 1959.
  - Joe Walsh, 80, catcher who appeared in five games for the New York Highlanders in 1910 and 1911.
- January 13 – Charlie Gelbert, 60, shortstop/third baseman for the St. Louis Cardinals, Cincinnati Reds, Detroit Tigers, Washington Senators and Boston Red Sox (1929–1932, 1935–1937, 1939–1940) whose promising career was ruined by a severe leg wound suffered in a hunting accident that cost him the 1933–1934 seasons; his stellar play as starting shortstop for the champion 1931 Cardinals during the World Series helped St. Louis defeat the favored Philadelphia Athletics.
- January 17 – Charlie Maloney, 80, pitcher who worked in one game for Boston of the National League on August 10, 1908.
- January 18 – Goose Tatum, 45 or 48, legendary basketball player for the Harlem Globetrotters who also was a first baseman/outfielder for Birmingham, Cincinnati and Indianapolis of the Negro American League between 1941 and 1948.
- January 25 – George Gibson, 86, catcher in 1,213 games over 14 seasons for the Pittsburgh Pirates (1905–1916, including 1909 world champions) and New York Giants (1917–1918); manager of Pirates (1920–1922 and 1932–1934) and interim pilot of Chicago Cubs (1925); one of the first Canadians to manage in MLB and elected to Canada's Sports Hall of Fame and Canadian Baseball Hall of Fame.
- January 26 – Jud Daley, 82, outfielder in 80 games for the 1911–1912 Brooklyn Dodgers.

=== February ===
- February 4 – Earle Mack, 77, son of Connie Mack; first baseman, third baseman and catcher in five total games for the Philadelphia Athletics (1910, 1911, 1914); minor league player and player-manager (1910–1917, 1920–1923); coach and assistant manager (to his father) for the Athletics from 1924 to May 1950; co-owner of the Athletics with his brother Roy from August 1950 to November 1954, when the Mack brothers sold the team to industrialist Arnold Johnson, who moved it from Philadelphia to Kansas City in 1955.
- February 7 – Joe Vitelli, 58, pitcher who worked in four contests for the wartime 1944 Pittsburgh Pirates.
- February 9 – Billy Burke, 77, left-handed pitcher in 22 games for Boston of the National League in 1910 and 1911.
- February 10 – Betty Whiting, 41, who played at first base for seven different teams of the All-American Girls Professional Baseball League in a span of nine years.
- February 12
  - Dutch Distel, 70, played in eight games for the St. Louis Cardinals in 1918, mostly as a second baseman.
  - Bob Rhoads, 87, pitcher for the Chicago Cubs, Cleveland Indians, and St. Louis Cardinals in the early 20th century, who won 22 games and posted a 1.80 ERA for Cleveland in 1906.
- February 14 – Jimmy Johnston, 77, infielder-outfielder in 1,377 games for the Chicago White Sox (1911), Chicago Cubs (1914), Brooklyn Robins (1916–1925), Boston Braves (1926) and New York Giants (1926); played for Brooklyn's 1916 and 1920 NL champions; later a coach with the Brooklyn Dodgers.
- February 18 – Ralph Miller, 68, pitcher who appeared in one game for the Washington Senators on September 16, 1921.
- February 21 – Lou Tost, 55, left-handed pitcher who worked in 38 games for the 1942–1943 Boston Braves and one contest for the 1947 Pittsburgh Pirates.
- February 23 – Chaney White, 72, outfielder who played in 598 games in the Negro leagues over 11 seasons between 1920 and 1936, batting .321 lifetime.
- February 24 – Jake Propst, 71, infielder who appeared in one game as a pinch hitter for the Washington Senators on August 7, 1923.
- February 26
  - Tommy Heath, 53, catcher in 134 games for St. Louis Browns (1935; 1937–1938); later a minor league manager and MLB scout.
  - George Yantz, 80, catcher for the 1912 Chicago Cubs who went one-for-one (1.000) during his one-game MLB tenure.

=== March ===
- March 1 – Claude Grier, 62, left-hander who pitched in 72 career games for Washington, Wilmington and Atlantic City of the Eastern Colored League between 1924 and 1927; led 1926 ECL in complete games with 19 in 20 games started.
- March 4 – Bullet Rogan, 73, standout pitcher for the Kansas City Monarchs, elected to the Baseball Hall of Fame in 1998; went 120–52 (2.65) over 12 seasons between 1920 and 1935; twice led Negro National League in games won and shutouts, and also led NNL in complete games three times and winning percentage and earned run average once each.
- March 6
  - Vince Castino, 49, catcher who appeared in 88 games for the Chicago White Sox from 1943 to 1945.
  - Jack Meyer, 34, pitcher who worked in 202 games for the 1955–1961 Philadelphia Phillies.
- March 7
  - Johnie Scott, 53, outfielder for the Birmingham Black Barons and Kansas City Monarchs of the Negro American League between 1944 and 1948, appearing in 165 games.
  - Al Shealy, 66, pitcher who hurled in 47 total games for 1928 New York Yankees and 1930 Chicago Cubs; member of 1928 world champions.
- March 10 – Billy Orr, 75, shortstop in 40 games for the 1913–1914 Philadelphia Athletics.
- March 14 – Eddie Hunter, 62, Cincinnati Reds third baseman who played one game as a defensive replacement on August 5, 1933, and never recorded a big-league plate appearance.
- March 21 – Pat Parker, 73, who appeared in three games as an outfielder and pinch hitter for the St. Louis Browns in August 1915.
- March 26 – George F. Wilson, 77, catcher who appeared in five games for the 1911 Detroit Tigers and one contest for the 1914 Boston Red Sox.
- March 30 – Ivan Howard, 84, infielder in 102 games for the 1914–1915 St. Louis Browns and 1917–1918 Cleveland Indians.

=== April ===
- April 1 – Halley Harding, 62, shortstop/outfielder who played in 380 Negro National League games (1926–1931 and 1937), primarily for the Kansas City Monarchs and Detroit Stars.
- April 7 – Shanty Hogan, 61, hard-hitting, heavyweight catcher for the Boston Braves, New York Giants and Washington Senators, who played in 989 games between 1925 and 1936.
- April 13
  - Tommy Griffith, 77, outfielder who appeared in 1,401 games between 1913 and 1925 for the Boston Braves, Cincinnati Reds, Brooklyn Robins and Chicago Cubs; played in all seven games of the 1920 World Series, starting six as the Robins' right fielder.
  - Herb Welch, 66, shortstop who played 13 games for the 1925 Boston Red Sox.
- April 16 – Jim Tennant, 60, pitcher who worked in one inning of one game for the New York Giants on September 28, 1919.
- April 17 – Dutch Rudolph, 84, outfielder/pinch hitter who got into three total MLB games for the 1903 Philadelphia Phillies and 1904 Chicago Cubs.
- April 22
  - Fritz Maisel, 77, third baseman and second baseman for New York Yankees (1913–1917) and St. Louis Browns (1918); led American League in stolen bases (74) in 1914.
  - Bill Salkeld, 50, catcher who hit for the cycle as a rookie for the 1945 Pittsburgh Pirates and was also a member of the 1948 National League champion Boston Braves.
- April 27 – "John McGraw," né Roy Elmer Hoar, 76, pitcher for the 1915 Brooklyn Tip-Tops of the "outlaw" Federal League; Carnegie Mellon alumnus who, to preserve amateur status, pitched under an alias matching the name of the Hall of Fame baseball manager.
- April 29
  - Johnny Butler, 74, shortstop-third baseman in 375 games for the Brooklyn Robins, Chicago Cubs and St. Louis Cardinals between 1926 and 1929.
  - Walt Smallwood, 74, pitcher who worked in eight total games for the New York Yankees (1917, 1919).

=== May ===
- May 8 – Ossie Orwoll, 66, first baseman and left-handed pitcher who played in 94 games for the Philadelphia Athletics in 1928 and 1929.
- May 13
  - Eddie Pick, 68, played in 66 games, primarily as a third baseman, for the 1923–1924 Cincinnati Reds and 1927 Chicago Cubs.
  - Jim Walsh, 72, southpaw who pitched for the 1921 Detroit Tigers.
- May 14 – Vic Saier, 76, first baseman for the Chicago Cubs from 1911 to 1917 and Pittsburgh Pirates in 1919; led National League in triples with 21 in 1913.
- May 19 – Jiggs Parson, 81, pitcher with Boston of the National League who worked in 17 games in 1910 and 1911.
- May 20 – Senaida Wirth, 40, All-Star shortstop in the All-American Girls Professional Baseball League.
- May 26 – Bud Davis, 71, pitcher in 17 games for horrible (43–109) Philadelphia Athletics of 1915; became full-time outfielder after 1920 in minor leagues, where he batted .331 lifetime, including .400 in 1924.

=== June ===
- June 4 – Henry Benn, 77, pitcher for the 1914 Cleveland Naps of the American League.
- June 6 – Otis Brannan, 68, second baseman in 158 career games for the 1928–1929 St. Louis Browns.
- June 8 – Art Jacobs, 64, southpaw who pitched one inning of one game for the Cincinnati Reds on June 18, 1939—and earned a save in the Reds' 12–6 victory over the Boston Bees.
- June 10 – Pete Fahrer, 77, relief pitcher who worked in eight innings over five games for Cincinnati in 1914.
- June 13
  - Doug Baird, 75, outfielder-third baseman who appeared in 617 games between 1915 and 1920 for the Pittsburgh Pirates, St. Louis Cardinals, Philadelphia Phillies, Brooklyn Robins and New York Giants.
  - Dick Reichle, 70, outfielder who played in 128 games in 1922 and 1923 for the Boston Red Sox; first visiting player to hit a home run at Yankee Stadium (April 20, 1923, off Waite Hoyt)—and it was Reichle's only MLB homer.
- June 15
  - Ollie Welf, 78, outfielder by trade whose only MLB appearance came as a pinch runner for Cleveland on August 30, 1916.
  - Rip Wade, 59, outfielder in 59 games for the 1923 Washington Senators.
- June 16 – Dutch Holland, 63, outfielder who appeared in 102 career games for the Boston Braves and Cleveland Indians between 1932 and 1934.
- June 23
  - Al Bashang, 78, outfielder who played in 18 MLB games for the 1912 Detroit Tigers and 1918 Brooklyn Robins.
  - Tookie Gilbert, 38, first baseman and minor-league slugger who appeared in 183 games during 1950 and 1953 stints with the New York Giants; his father and brother also played in the major leagues.
- June 24 – Roy Castleton, 81, southpaw who pitched in 11 total games divided amongst the 1907 New York Highlanders and the 1909–1910 Cincinnati Reds.
- June 30
  - Fred Liese, 81, pinch hitter who had five plate appearances for Boston of the National League in April 1910.
  - Hap Myers, 80, first baseman for the 1910–11 Boston Red Sox, 1911 St. Louis Browns, 1913 Boston Braves and 1914–1915 Brooklyn Tip-Tops (Federal League); appeared in 377 games in all.

=== July ===
- July 6
  - Jim Asbell, 53, outfielder who played 17 games for the 1938 Chicago Cubs.
  - Cotton Knaupp, 77, shortstop who played in 31 games for the 1910–1911 Cleveland Naps.
- July 7 – Joe Weiss, 73, first baseman for the 1915 Chicago Whales (Federal League).
- July 10 – Art "Skinny" Graham, 57, outfielder who got into 21 games for the Boston Red Sox in 1934 and 1935.
- July 13 – Art "The Great" Shires, 60, colorful first baseman (and would-be prizefighter) who batted .291 in 290 career games for the Chicago White Sox (1928–1930), Washington Senators (1930) and Boston Braves (1932).
- July 14 – Bill Dalrymple, 76, who appeared in three games as a third baseman, pinch hitter and pinch runner for the St. Louis Browns in July 1915.

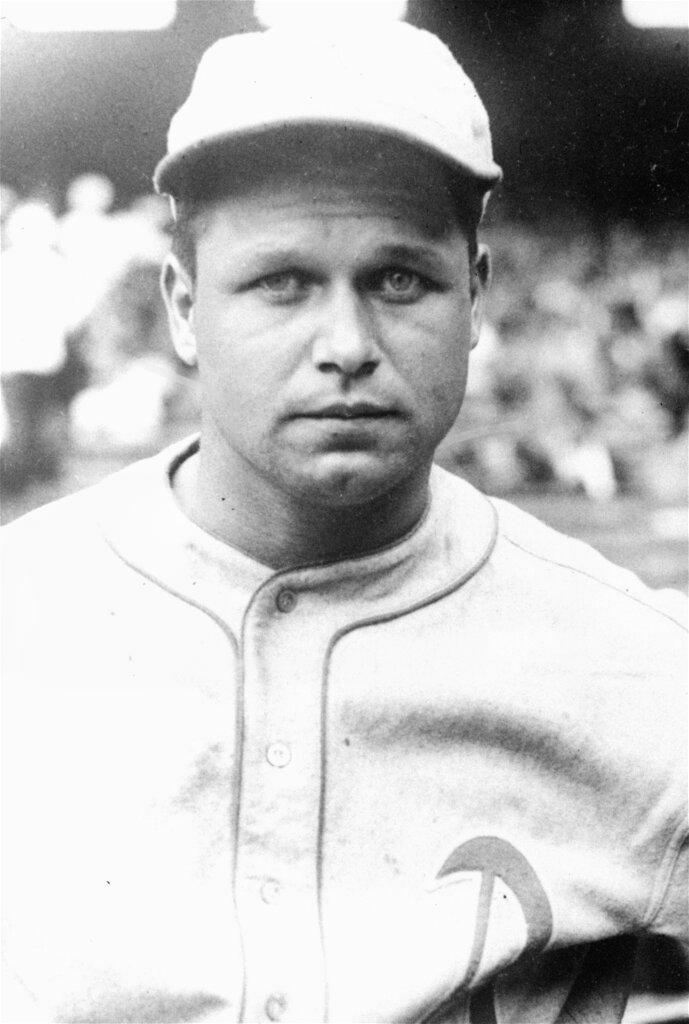
Jimmie Foxx in 1930

- July 21 – Jimmie Foxx, 59, Hall of Fame first baseman (Philadelphia Athletics, Boston Red Sox, Chicago Cubs and Philadelphia Phillies) between 1925 and 1945, who retired with more career home runs (534) than any player except Babe Ruth; a 3-time MVP and the AL's 1933 triple crown winner, he hit .325 lifetime and played in the first nine All-Star games.
- July 25 – Mike Chartak, 51, outfielder and first baseman who got into 256 career games for the New York Yankees (1940 and 1942), Washington Senators (1942) and St. Louis Browns (1942–1944); played for the Browns in the 1944 World Series.
- July 29 – Ray Kolp, 72, pitcher who logged 383 appearances in a 12-season MLB career with the St. Louis Browns (1921–1924) and Cincinnati Reds (1927–1934).

=== August ===
- August 3 – Ed Young, 54, first baseman, catcher and third baseman who played eight seasons in the Negro American League for the Chicago American Giants between 1938 and 1947; also played for 1947 Homestead Grays.
- August 13 – Mike Hechinger, 77, catcher in 13 games for Chicago Cubs and Brooklyn Superbas in 1912–1913.
- August 15 – Karl Meister, 76, Cincinnati Reds outfielder who appeared in four games in August and September 1913.
- August 17 – Ray Caldwell, 79, spitball pitcher who won 134 games over 12 seasons spent with the New York Highlanders/Yankees (1910–1918), Boston Red Sox (1919) and Cleveland Indians (1919–1921); knocked unconscious on the pitcher's mound when he was struck by lightning during the ninth inning of an August 24, 1919, game while with Cleveland, but he stayed in the contest after being revived and hurled a complete-game, 2–1 victory; no-hit the Yankees two weeks later, on September 10; won 20 games the following year as a member of the 1920 World Series champion Indians.
- August 19 – George Walker, 52, pitcher in the Negro leagues between 1937 and 1943, most prominently for the Kansas City Monarchs; led Negro American League in wins and winning percentage in 1939 and in earned run average in both 1940 and 1941.
- August 21 – Slim McGrew, 68, a 6 ft 7 in (2.01 m)-tall, 235 lb (107 kg) pitcher who took the mound for ten games over three seasons (1922–1924) for the Washington Senators.
- August 25 – Emmett Nelson, 62, pitcher in 25 total games for 1934–1935 Cincinnati Reds.
- August 29 – Joe Fitzgerald, 70, minor league catcher who became a coach for the Washington Senators (1944–1957); scouted for the Senators and Minnesota Twins from 1958 until his death.

=== September ===
- September 2 – Jack Ryan, 62, outfielder who appeared in two games for the 1929 Boston Red Sox.
- September 3 – Floyd Kranson, 54, pitcher/outfielder in 46 total games for three Negro American League clubs, principally the Kansas City Monarchs, between 1937 and 1940.
- September 4
  - Hugh Canavan, 70, left-hander who pitched in 11 games for the 1918 Boston Braves.
  - George Loepp, 65, center fielder who appeared in 65 career games for the 1928 Boston Red Sox and 1930 Washington Senators.
  - Clyde Manion, 70, catcher who appeared in 477 games over 13 seasons for the Detroit Tigers (1920–1924 and 1926–1927), St. Louis Browns (1928–1930) and Cincinnati Reds (1930–1934).
- September 5 – Jack Tising, 63, pitcher in 19 pro seasons between 1924 and 1946 who played only ten games in the majors for the 1936 Pittsburgh Pirates.
- September 12 – Rollie Zeider, 83, infielder for three Chicago franchises (White Sox, Whales and Cubs), as well as the New York Yankees, from 1910 to 1918; played in 941 career big-league contests.
- September 13
  - Ralph LaPointe, 45, shortstop and second baseman who played 143 total games for 1947 Philadelphia Phillies and 1948 St. Louis Cardinals; head baseball coach of the University of Vermont from 1952 until his death.
  - Joe Stanley, 86, outfielder for four major-league teams over seven seasons between 1897 and 1909, including both the National League (1897) and American League (1902 and 1905–1906) versions of the Washington Senators.

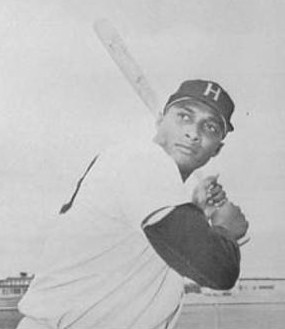
Walt Bond in 1965

- September 14 – Walt Bond, 29, outfielder who played 365 career games in all or part of six seasons for the Cleveland Indians, Houston Colt .45s/Astros and Minnesota Twins between April 1960 and May 1967, when leukemia forced him to retire.
- September 16 – Lee King, 74, outfielder in 411 games for the Pittsburgh Pirates, Philadelphia Phillies and New York Giants from 1916 to 1922; in his final MLB at bat, in the eighth inning of Game 5 of the 1922 World Series, drove in an insurance run with a single to cap a three-run rally in the Giants' clinching, 5–3 victory over the New York Yankees.
- September 17 – Karl Adams, 76, pitcher who worked in 30 career games for the 1914 Cincinnati Reds and 1915 Chicago Cubs.
- September 23 – Mose Offutt, 67, southpaw who pitched in 20 games in 1925 for Indianapolis of the Negro National League.
- September 24 – John Allen, 76, pitcher who appeared in one game for the Baltimore Terrapins of the Federal League on June 2, 1914.
- September 25 – Phil Geier, 90, outfielder who played for five teams between 1896 and 1904, appearing in 349 games.
- September 27 – Frank Barnes, 67, left-handed hurler who worked in six total games for the 1929 Detroit Tigers and 1930 New York Yankees.
- September 28 – Bill Powell, 82, pitcher in 17 games for three National League clubs, primarily the Pittsburgh Pirates, between 1909 and 1913.

=== October ===
- October 2
  - Orville Armbrust, 59, pitcher who fashioned a spotless 1–0 record and a 2.13 ERA over three games in his only MLB trial with the Washington Senators in September 1934.
  - Jackie Price, 54, professional baseball shortstop during the 1930s and 1940s who became famous for sideline comedy, stunts and clowning that entertained fans before and during games; signed as a fan attraction by Cleveland Indians owner Bill Veeck in 1946 and activated for seven August and September games; his clowning skills were showcased in the MGM film Diamond Demon (1947).
  - Bull Wagner, 79, stocky relief pitcher who appeared in 24 games for Brooklyn of the National League in 1913–1914.
- October 3 – Fritz Mollwitz, 77, German-born first baseman who played in 634 games between 1913 and 1917 for the Chicago Cubs, Cincinnati Reds, Pittsburgh Pirates and St. Louis Cardinals.
- October 4 – Ed Barney, 77, outfielder in 88 career games for the 1915 New York Yankees and 1915–1916 Pittsburgh Pirates.
- October 13 – Joe Cates, 62, infielder who played in 28 games for the 1931 Louisville White Sox of the Negro National League.
- October 17 – Louise Clapp, 33, All-American Girls Professional Baseball League pitcher.
- October 19 – Art Garibaldi, 60, third baseman and second baseman who played in 71 games for the 1936 St. Louis Cardinals; a fixture in the Pacific Coast League, playing 11 PCL seasons in the 12 years from 1931 to 1942.
- October 22
  - Oscar Givens, 45, infielder who played in 19 games over three seasons (1939, 1946, 1948) for the Newark Eagles of the Negro National League.
  - Rube Wiggins, 46, southpaw who hurled for the 1938 New York Black Yankees of the NNL.
- October 27 – Bill Bailey, 85, outfielder who appeared in five games for 1911 New York Highlanders.

=== November ===
- November 1 – Frank Gabler, 55, pitcher who worked in 113 games for the New York Giants, Boston Bees and Chicago White Sox between 1935 and 1938; later, longtime scout and pitching instructor.
- November 2
  - Clem Clemens, 81, catcher who appeared in 34 career games for the 1914–1915 Chicago Whales (Federal League) and the 1916 Chicago Cubs.
  - Frank Wickware, 79, fireballing pitcher in the Negro leagues whose career extended from 1909 to 1925 and who wore the uniforms of over a dozen teams.
- November 4 – Tom Lanning, 60, left-handed hurler who appeared in three games for the 1938 Philadelphia Phillies.
- November 12 – Cleo Carlyle, 65, outfielder who played in 95 games for the Boston Red Sox in 1927.
- November 18 – Mike Prendergast, 78, pitcher for Chicago of the "outlaw" Federal League (1914–1915), Chicago Cubs (1916–1917) and Philadelphia Phillies (1918–1919) who worked in 180 career games.
- November 24
  - Joe Kelly, 67, outfielder, first baseman and pinch hitter who played in 97 games for 1926 and 1928 Chicago Cubs.
  - Rusty Saunders, 61, outfielder and pinch hitter in five games for the 1927 Philadelphia Athletics; also a professional basketball player.

=== December ===
- December 2 – Dennis Graham, 71, outfielder for the Homestead Grays of Black baseball between 1924 and 1930; also played for the Atlantic City Bacharach Giants (1921) and Pittsburgh Crawfords (1931).
- December 4 – Monchile Concepción, 62, native of Puerto Rico who was a pitcher/shortstop for the 1934 Philadelphia Bacharach Giants of the Negro National League.
- December 5 – Jack Lively, 82, pitcher who posted a 7–5 record in 18 games for 1911 Detroit Tigers.
- December 6 – Claude Sullivan, 42, member of the Cincinnati Reds' radio broadcast team since 1964, and lead play-by-play announcer from 1966 until his death.
- December 7 – George V. McLaughlin, 80, banker; as president of the Brooklyn Trust Company and trustee of the Dodgers, played a pivotal behind-the-scenes role in the fate of the franchise in the 1930s and 1940s; brought Larry MacPhail, Branch Rickey and Walter O'Malley into management/ownership posts, with O'Malley ultimately becoming the majority owner who masterminded the Dodgers' transfer from Brooklyn to Los Angeles after the 1957 season.
- December 19 – Walter Tappan, 77, shortstop/third baseman in 18 games for the 1914 Kansas City Packers (Federal League).
- December 27 – Paul Lehner, 47, outfielder in 540 games for the St. Louis Browns, Philadelphia Athletics, Chicago White Sox, Cleveland Indians and Boston Red Sox between 1946 and 1952.
- December 28
  - James M. Johnston, 72, co-owner and board chairman of the Washington Senators from January 29, 1963 until his death.
  - Bill Pertica, 69, pitcher for the Boston Red Sox (1918) and St. Louis Cardinals (1921–1923); appeared in 74 career games, 73 as a Cardinal.
- December 31 – Shovel Hodge, 74, Chicago White Sox pitcher from 1920 to 1922, who worked in 75 MLB games.
