= Bob Raudman =

American baseball player (1942–2020)

Bob "Shorty" Raudman
- Outfielder
- Born: March 14, 1942; Erie, Pennsylvania, U.S.
- Died: December 17, 2020 (aged 78); Duluth, Minnesota, U.S.
- Batted: Left Threw: Left

MLB debut
- September 13, 1966, for the Chicago Cubs

Last MLB appearance
- September 12, 1967, for the Chicago Cubs

MLB statistics
- Batting average: .200
- Home runs: 0
- Runs batted in: 3
- Stats at Baseball Reference

Teams
- Chicago Cubs (1966–1967)

Robert Joyce "Shorty" Raudman (March 14, 1942 – December 17, 2020) was an American professional baseball player, an outfielder whose eight-season (1961–68) career included 16 games played in Major League Baseball, divided between the 1966 and 1967 Chicago Cubs.

Listed at 5 feet 9 inches (1.75 m) tall and 185 pounds (84 kg), Raudman signed with the Cubs after attending Monroe High School in what is now North Hills, California. Despite his size, he was a power hitter in minor league baseball, amassing 17 or more home runs in four of his eight pro seasons.

Raudman's first Cub trial came after he hit 20 homers with 84 runs batted in for the 1966 Tacoma Cubs of the Triple-A Pacific Coast League. He started eight games in left field in September and collected seven hits, including two doubles. In 1967, he hit 17 home runs for Tacoma, sandwiched between brief appearances with the Cubs in April and September, then was traded on November 21, 1967, to the Cleveland Indians (to complete an earlier deal for pitcher Dick Radatz). The Indians then immediately packaged Raudman, pitcher George Culver and first baseman Fred Whitfield to obtain outfielder Tommy Harper from the Cincinnati Reds.

Raudman died on December 17, 2020, at the age of 78.
