= Thad Tillotson =

American baseball player

- Pitcher
- Born: December 20, 1940; Merced, California, U.S.
- Died: May 16, 2012 (aged 71); Merced, California, U.S.
- Batted: Right Threw: Right

MLB debut
- April 14, 1967, for the New York Yankees

Last MLB appearance
- August 11, 1968, for the New York Yankees

MLB statistics
- Win–loss record: 4–9
- Earned run average: 4.06
- Strikeouts: 63

NPB statistics
- Win–loss record: 3–4
- Earned run average: 6.35
- Strikeouts: 20
- Stats at Baseball Reference

Teams
- New York Yankees (1967–1968); Nankai Hawks (1971)

Thaddeus Asa Tillotson, Jr. (December 20, 1940 – May 16, 2012) was an American relief pitcher in Major League Baseball pitcher. Listed at 6' 2", 195 lb., Tillotson batted and threw right handed. He was born in Merced, California.

Tillotson played for the New York Yankees in 1967 and 1968. He also played one season in Japan for the Nankai Hawks in 1971.

Tillotson was originally signed by the Los Angeles Dodgers as an amateur free agent in 1960. In 50 career games, he had a 4–9 record with a 4.06 earned run average.
