= Tommy Harper =

American baseball player (born 1940)

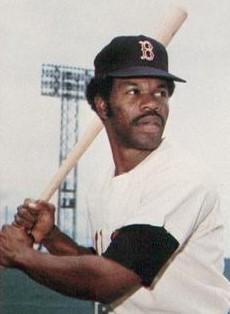
- Outfielder / Third baseman
- Born: October 14, 1940 (age 85); Oak Grove, Louisiana, U.S.
- Batted: Right Threw: Right

MLB debut
- April 9, 1962, for the Cincinnati Reds

Last MLB appearance
- September 29, 1976, for the Baltimore Orioles

MLB statistics
- Batting average: .257
- Home runs: 146
- Runs batted in: 567
- Stolen bases: 408
- Stats at Baseball Reference

Teams
- As player: Cincinnati Reds (1962–1967); Cleveland Indians (1968); Seattle Pilots / Milwaukee Brewers (1969–1971); Boston Red Sox (1972–1974); California Angels (1975); Oakland Athletics (1975); Baltimore Orioles (1976); As coach: Boston Red Sox (1980–1984); Montreal Expos (1990–1999); Boston Red Sox (2000–2002)

Career highlights and awards
- All-Star (1970); 2× AL stolen base leader (1969, 1973); Boston Red Sox Hall of Fame

Tommy Harper (born October 14, 1940) is an American former professional baseball outfielder, third baseman and second baseman. He played in Major League Baseball (MLB) for seven different franchises from 1962 to 1976, including six seasons with the Cincinnati Reds and three seasons each with the Milwaukee Brewers and the Boston Red Sox. He was selected to one All-Star Game and led the league in stolen bases twice.

== High School and college ==
Harper played at Encinal High School in Alameda, California, where his teammates included future Baseball Hall-of-Famer Willie Stargell and MLB player Curt Motton. He starred collegiately for San Francisco State University.

== Cincinnati Reds ==
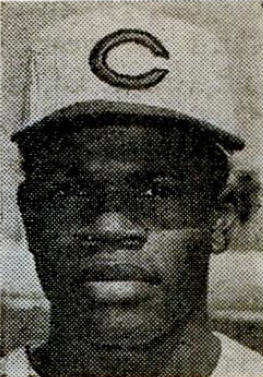
Harper in 1963

Harper signed as an amateur free agent with the Reds before the 1960 season (as Major League Baseball had yet to institute a draft) and was assigned to the Class B Topeka Reds, where he had modest success, posting a .254 batting average with five home runs and 36 runs batted in (RBI) in 79 games. After hitting .324 with 15 home runs and 65 RBI in 124 games for Topeka the following season, he was promoted all the way up to the Triple-A San Diego Padres, where he hit .333 with 26 home runs and 84 RBI in 144 games.

Harper's performance earned him a call-up to the major-league club, and he appeared in six total games in 1962, batting .174 (4-for-23) with one RBI. In the 1963 and 1964 seasons, Harper was a platoon player for the Reds, working mostly as an outfielder. His breakout season was 1965, as he became the Reds' starting left fielder and leadoff hitter. He finished the season batting .257 with 18 home runs, 64 RBI, 35 stolen bases, and a National League-leading 126 runs scored in 159 games. He occupied the leadoff role for the next three seasons for the Reds, starting at all three outfield positions and serving as backup infielder until being traded.

== Cleveland Indians ==
On November 21, 1967, Harper was traded to the Cleveland Indians in exchange for George Culver, Bob Raudman and Fred Whitfield. Harper played only one season with the Indians, starting mostly in left and right field and seeing playing time at center field and second base as well. In 117 games, he hit .217 with six home runs and 26 RBI. Despite his struggles, Harper was drafted by the Seattle Pilots as the third pick in the 1968 expansion draft.

== Seattle Pilots/Milwaukee Brewers ==
Harper was the first player to come to bat in Seattle Pilots history when he led off the top of the 1st against right-hander Jim McGlothlin of the California Angels. In that inaugural at bat, he was also the first Pilots player to record a hit, doubling to left field, and then scoring the Pilots first run on a home run by Mike Hegan. Harper led the American League with a career-high 73 stolen bases—the most by an American Leaguer since Ty Cobb's 96 in 1915 and a mark that still stands today as a Pilots/Brewers record. He also showed his versatility in the field, making over 50 starts at both second and third base, 21 starts in center field, and also seeing playing time at both corner outfield positions.

When the Pilots moved to Milwaukee and changed names the following season, Harper was also the first player to come to bat in Milwaukee Brewers history. On April 7, 1970, he led off the bottom of the first against California Angels right-hander Andy Messersmith. He hit a ground ball to third baseman Aurelio Rodríguez, who threw to first baseman Jim Spencer for the out. The 1970 season was probably the best statistically in Harper's career. He recorded career highs in hits (179), doubles (35), home runs (31), and RBI (82) on his way to the lone All-Star game appearance of his career. He also became the first Brewer, and just the fifth major leaguer at that point, to join the 30–30 club by hitting 31 home runs and stealing 38 bases and came in sixth in the AL MVP voting. A second Brewer did not join him in the 30–30 club until Ryan Braun accomplished the feat in 2011.

== Boston Red Sox ==
Harper was part of a ten-player blockbuster that sent him, Marty Pattin, Lew Krausse and minor-league outfielder Pat Skrable to the Boston Red Sox for George Scott, Jim Lonborg, Ken Brett, Billy Conigliaro, Joe Lahoud and Don Pavletich on October 10, 1971. Harper became the Sox' starting center fielder and leadoff hitter from 1972–74, playing well enough to earn him votes in the AL MVP balloting in '72 and '73. 1973 was his best season with the club, as he led the league in stolen bases for the second time in his career, setting an all-time Red Sox mark with 54, until Jacoby Ellsbury broke the record on August 25, 2009. In 1974, Harper hit .237 with five home runs, 24 RBI and 28 stolen bases in 118 games, playing primarily as a designated hitter. Harper's trade to the California Angels for Bob Heise at the Winter Meetings on December 2, 1974 was driven by the Red Sox using its outfielder surplus to address its lack of infielder depth.

== California Angels ==
Harper played only part of the 1975 season for California, batting .239 with three home runs and 31 RBI in 89 games. The Angels, well on their way to a last-place division finish, sold him for cash to the contending Oakland Athletics on August 13, 1975.

== Oakland Athletics ==
Revitalized by the trade to a contender, Harper hit .319 in August and September for the A's and became their starting first baseman, also seeing spot duty in the outfield and at third base. Harper was also a perfect 7 of 7 in stolen base attempts. Harper was a key in Oakland's AL West championship drive not only because of his help with the bat, but also because his versatile fielding allowed the As to use the aging Billy Williams at DH where his still powerful bat was useful and where his play in the field was not a liability.

Harper finally saw his first playoff action at age 34 after 14 major league seasons, but was limited to one plate appearance, a walk, as the A's were swept by his old team, the Red Sox. Harper was released by the A's after the season.

== Baltimore Orioles ==
Harper signed with the Baltimore Orioles on April 9, 1976. He played sparingly at DH and also saw some time as a pinch hitter, batting .234 with a home run and 7 RBI in 46 games. He was released by the Orioles following the season.

== Career statistics ==
In 1810 games over 15 seasons, Harper compiled a .257 batting average (1,609-for-6,269) with 972 runs, 256 doubles, 36 triples, 146 home runs, 567 RBI, 408 stolen bases, 753 base on balls, 1,080 strikeouts, .338 on-base percentage and .379 slugging percentage. Defensively, he recorded a .973 fielding percentage. He played first base, second base, third base and all three outfield positions in his major league career.

== Coaching career ==
Harper served as the first base coach for the Red Sox from 1980 to 1984. During the 1985 season, he held a non-uniformed role with the team; he was dismissed from the team in December. His dismissal was allegedly in retaliation for speaking out in the spring about the club's "long-term association with an all-white Elks Club in Winter Haven", where the team held spring training. On July 1, 1986, the Equal Employment Opportunity Commission ruled that Harper's dismissal "was held to be without merit". In December 1986, Harper and the Red Sox reached a settlement, the terms of which were not disclosed.

Harper next worked as a coach from 1990 through 1999 with the Montreal Expos, spending three seasons as the first base coach and then seven seasons as the hitting coach. He returned to the Red Sox as the team's first base coach from 2000 through 2002. As of the start of the 2017 season, he remained with the Red Sox as a player development consultant.

Harper was elected to the Boston Red Sox Hall of Fame in 2010.

== Highlights ==
- 24-consecutive-game hitting streak (July 17 – August 8, 1966)
- 16 games with four hits
- Four stolen bases vs. the Chicago White Sox (June 18, 1969)
- Three games with three stolen bases
- All-Star (1970)
- Led National League in runs (126, 1965)
- Twice led American League in stolen bases (73, 1969; 54, 1973)
- Became the fifth 30–30 club member (31 home runs and 38 stolen bases, 1970)
- Boston Red Sox MVP (1973)
- Top 10 American League MVP (1970)
- His career 408 stolen bases ranks him tied for 68th on the all-time list (entering the 2026 season)
- Single-season stolen base records for the Brewers

== See also ==
- 30–30 club
- List of Major League Baseball annual runs scored leaders
- List of Major League Baseball annual stolen base leaders
- List of Major League Baseball career stolen bases leaders

Sporting positions
Preceded by Johnny Pesky; Dave Jauss	Boston Red Sox first-base coach 1980–1984; 2000–2002	Succeeded by Joe Morgan; Dallas Williams
