= Jim Lonborg =

American baseball player (born 1942)

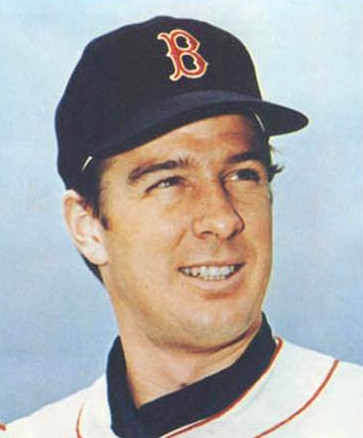
- Lonborg in 1969
- Pitcher
- Born: April 16, 1942 (age 84); Santa Maria, California, U.S.
- Batted: Right Threw: Right

MLB debut
- April 23, 1965, for the Boston Red Sox

Last MLB appearance
- June 10, 1979, for the Philadelphia Phillies

MLB statistics
- Win–loss record: 157–137
- Earned run average: 3.86
- Strikeouts: 1,475
- Stats at Baseball Reference

Teams
- Boston Red Sox (1965–1971); Milwaukee Brewers (1972); Philadelphia Phillies (1973–1979)

Career highlights and awards
- All-Star (1967); AL Cy Young Award (1967); AL wins leader (1967); AL strikeout leader (1967); Boston Red Sox Hall of Fame

James Reynold Lonborg (born April 16, 1942) is an American former professional baseball right-handed starting pitcher, who played in Major League Baseball (MLB) with the Boston Red Sox, Milwaukee Brewers, and Philadelphia Phillies. Though nicknamed "Gentleman Jim", he was known for fearlessly pitching on the inside of the plate throughout his fifteen-year career.

== Early life ==
Lonborg was born on April 16, 1942, in Santa Maria, California. His father was a professor of agriculture. Lonborg attended San Luis Obispo High School in San Luis Obispo, California, where he excelled in both baseball and basketball. One of his teammates was future major league pitcher Mel Queen, who would also become his brother-in-law.

Lonborg attended Stanford University as a pre-med student on an academic scholarship, graduating in 1963. He pitched on the school's baseball team as a walk-on, and was its MVP as a junior. He was a walk-on player on the basketball team as well, but did not see a future as there was a star player ahead of him. He has been inducted into Stanford's Athletics Hall of Fame as a baseball player.

During his college years, the Baltimore Orioles had an interest in Lonborg, and he played as an amateur on teams sponsored by the Orioles during his college career. In 1963, he played in the Basin League for the Oriole-sponsored Winner Pheasants, along with future Oriole Hall of Fame pitcher Jim Palmer, and future Oriole player and .300 hitter Merv Rettenmund.

On August 14, 1963, he signed as an amateur free agent with the Boston Red Sox. The Red Sox' $25,000 signing bonus was far more than he had been offered by the Orioles.

== Professional baseball career ==
=== Boston Red Sox ===
Longborg spent only one year in the Red Sox minor league system (1964) before being called up to the team in 1965. In his rookie year for Boston, Lonborg had a 9–17 win loss record and 4.47 earned run average (ERA). A groundball pitcher, he was badly hurt by a leaky Red Sox defense. In 1966, with the team's roster on an upswing, he improved his record to 10–10, and his ERA to 3.86.

In the 1967 Red Sox' "Impossible Dream" season, Lonborg tied for the American League (AL) lead for pitchers in wins (22) and games started (39), and led the AL in strikeouts (246). He also led the league in hitting batters (19), after his pitching style changed under the tutelage of pitching coach Sal "The Barber" Maglie. Lonborg's nickname was "Gentleman Jim", while Maglie, as a pitcher for the Giants and Dodgers, was nicknamed "The Barber" for throwing high and tight to hitters who crowded the plate, a lesson he imparted to the now not-quite-as-gentlemanly (on the mound, anyway) Lonborg.

That year, the Red Sox were involved in a four-way race for the AL pennant with the Detroit Tigers, Minnesota Twins, and Chicago White Sox; the race was reduced to three teams after the White Sox lost a doubleheader to the Kansas City Athletics, on September 27. The Red Sox and Twins faced each other in the season's final series and entered the final day (October 1) tied for first place; the Tigers were half a game out of first and needed to sweep a doubleheader from the California Angels to force a playoff between the winner of the Red Sox–Twins game. Lonborg outdueled Twins ace Dean Chance in that finale, while the Tigers defeated the Angels in the first game but lost the second, putting the Red Sox in the World Series for the first time since 1946.

In that World Series against the St. Louis Cardinals, Lonborg pitched a one-hit shutout in Game 2 on October 5, only the fourth one-hitter in Series history. He followed that up with another victory in Game 5 four days later by limiting the Cards to three hits, and pitching a complete game again. Lonborg's boyhood idol Sandy Koufax was calling the World Series as a television broadcaster, and gave Lonborg game preparation advice on visualizing himself pitching, which Lonborg credited as helping with his success.

Called upon to pitch the seventh and deciding game with only two days rest, he lasted six innings, allowing six earned runs in a 7–2 loss. Teammate Dan Osinski remembered, "Lonborg couldn't break a pane of glass in the bullpen when he was warming up. We all knew that, and [Dick Williams] still started him. You know he could have pitched the bullpen an inning apiece, or something. It just gave Gibson too big a lead against us that we couldn't come back from." Shortly after being fired by the Red Sox, pitching coach Sal Maglie also criticized Williams's handling of Lonborg. "It was obvious Lonborg didn't have it. Williams should have gotten him out sooner, and I told him so. It was a crime that he let a man who'd done such a great job for him all season take a pounding like that. It was degrading."

Lonborg received the 1967 Cy Young Award, becoming the first Red Sox pitcher so honored since its 1956 creation, receiving 90% of the votes. He was selected to the 1967 AL All-Star Team, though he did not play in the All-Star Game, and finished prominently in voting for the MLB Most Valuable Player (MVP) award (placing 6th in the voting, with teammate Yastrzemski winning the award).

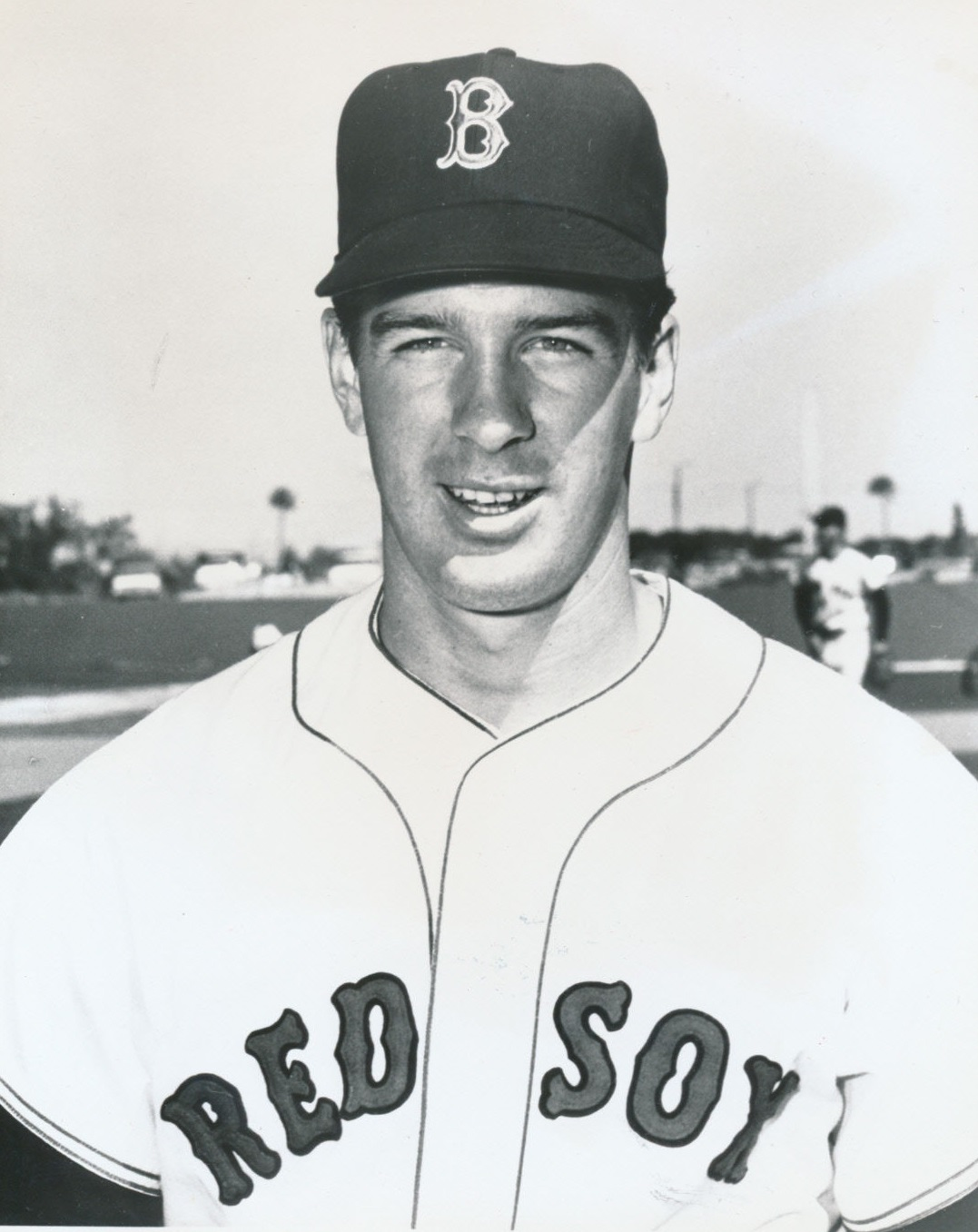
Lonborg in 1971

In December of 1967, Lonborg tore the ligaments in his left knee while skiing, and his pitching career thereafter was marked by many injuries. In trying to compensate for his knee injury, he developed right shoulder problems that lasted the remainder of his career. After pitching 273.1 innings in 1967, he never threw more than 167.2 innings in a season over the next four years with the Red Sox, winning only 27 games from 1968 through 1971. In both 1970 and 1971, he spent time with the Triple-A Louisville Colonels while trying to recover from his injuries and to regain his pitching form. He finished the 1971 season with the Red Sox going 10–7, his best record since 1967. It would not be until 1976, years after leaving Boston, that Lonborg's right shoulder would be pain free.

=== Milwaukee Brewers and Philadelphia Phillies ===
On October 10, 1971, Lonborg was traded along with George Scott, Ken Brett, Billy Conigliaro, Joe Lahoud and Don Pavletich to the Milwaukee Brewers in a ten-player trade, in return for Tommy Harper, Marty Pattin, Lew Krausse and minor-league outfielder Pat Skrable. In 1972, he had his second best season to date, with a 14–12 record, 2.83 ERA, and 143 strikeouts in 223 innings for the last place Brewers. His success was in part attributable to pitching coach Wes Stock, who changed Lonborg from a power pitcher into one who relied on control and change of speed.

With the Philadelphia Phillies needing to improve its pitching staff beyond Steve Carlton, a future Hall of Fame pitcher and 329 game winner, both Lonborg and Brett were acquired along with Ken Sanders and Earl Stephenson from the Brewers for Don Money, John Vukovich and Bill Champion on October 31, 1972. Like Stock, Phillies pitching coach Ray Rippelmeyer suggested adjustments that improved Lonborg's pitching significantly.

Lonborg spent the next six and a half seasons with Philadelphia before his release midway through the 1979 season. In 1974, he was 17–13 with a 3.21 ERA, leading the Phillies starting pitchers (including Carlton) in wins and ERA; and in 1976 Lonborg was 18–10 with a 3.08 ERA, second among starting pitchers in wins (Carlton had 20), and first in ERA. The Phillies reached the NL Championship Series in 1976 and 1977, losing both times. Lonborg pitched one game in each series, losing each. The Phillies lost the NL championship again in 1978, but Lonborg did not appear in the playoffs.

Lonborg's MLB career statistical totals include a 157–137 record with 1,475 strikeouts, a 3.86 ERA, 90 complete games, 15 shutouts, and 2464 1/3 innings pitched in 425 games. Lonborg was selected to the Boston Red Sox Hall of Fame in 2002.

Longborg's nickname was "Gentleman Jim".

== Personal life ==
Lonborg married 20 year old Rosemary Feeney in 1970. They have six children and many grandchildren.

After retiring from baseball, Lonborg attended the Tufts University School of Dental Medicine, and graduated in 1983 and began practicing. He worked as a general dentist in Hanover, Massachusetts, until he retired in 2017. He is active in many nonprofit organizations, including Catholic Charities, Little League Baseball, and The Jimmy Fund, as well as the Susan G. Komen foundation and those seeking to treat cystic fibrosis. Lonborg lives in Scituate, Massachusetts.

On the Boston-based sitcom Cheers, the photo of Sam Malone pitching is actually that of Lonborg. At times, Sam also wore Lonborg's number 16 Red Sox jersey.

== See also ==
- List of Major League Baseball annual strikeout leaders
- List of Major League Baseball annual wins leaders
- List of Major League Baseball career hit batsmen leaders
