= Rube Wiggins =

American baseball player

- Pitcher
- Born: January 18, 1921; Paterson, New Jersey, U.S.
- Died: October 22, 1967 (aged 46); Paterson, New Jersey, U.S.
- Threw: Left

Negro league baseball debut
- 1938, for the New York Black Yankees

Last appearance
- 1938, for the New York Black Yankees

Teams
- New York Black Yankees (1938)

Reuben Harding Wiggins (January 18, 1921 – October 22, 1967) was an American Negro league pitcher in the 1930s.

A native of Paterson, New Jersey, Wiggins played for the New York Black Yankees in 1938. He died in Paterson in 1967 at age 46.
