= 1967 Major League Baseball All-Star Game =

1967 American baseball competition

	1	2	3	4	5	6	7	8	9	10	11	12	13	14	15	R	H	E
National League	0	1	0	0	0	0	0	0	0	0	0	0	0	0	1	2	9	0
American League	0	0	0	0	0	1	0	0	0	0	0	0	0	0	0	1	8	0
- Date: July 11, 1967
- Venue: Anaheim Stadium
- City: Anaheim, California
- Managers: Walter Alston (LA); Hank Bauer (BAL)
- MVP: Tony Pérez (CIN)
- Attendance: 46,309
- Ceremonial first pitch: Red Ruffing and Lloyd Waner
- Television: NBC
- TV announcers: Curt Gowdy, Pee Wee Reese and Sandy Koufax
- Radio: NBC
- Radio announcers: Jim Simpson, Tony Kubek and Buddy Blattner

The 1967 Major League Baseball All-Star Game was the 38th midseason exhibition between the all-stars of the American League (AL) and the National League (NL), the two leagues comprising Major League Baseball. The game was played on July 11, 1967, at Anaheim Stadium in Anaheim, California, home of the California Angels of the American League. The game resulted in a 2–1 15 inning victory for the NL. It set the record for the longest All-Star Game by innings, subsequently matched in 2008.

== National League roster ==
Fifteen coaches and players, denoted in italics, would be inducted into the Baseball Hall of Fame.

=== Pitchers ===
Throws	Pitcher	Team	Notes
LH	Mike Cuellar	Houston Astros
RH	Don Drysdale	Los Angeles Dodgers
RH	Bob Gibson	St. Louis Cardinals
RH	Ferguson Jenkins	Chicago Cubs
LH	Denny Lemaster	Atlanta Braves	injured
RH	Juan Marichal	San Francisco Giants	starting pitcher
LH	Claude Osteen	Los Angeles Dodgers	did not pitch
RH	Tom Seaver	New York Mets
LH	Chris Short	Philadelphia Phillies	replaced Lemaster

=== Position players ===
Position	Player	Team	Notes
C	Tom Haller	San Francisco Giants
C	Tim McCarver	St. Louis Cardinals
C	Joe Torre	Atlanta Braves	starter
1B	Ernie Banks	Chicago Cubs
1B	Orlando Cepeda	St. Louis Cardinals	starter
2B	Tommy Helms	Cincinnati Reds
2B	Bill Mazeroski	Pittsburgh Pirates	starter
3B	Dick Allen	Philadelphia Phillies	starter
3B	Tony Pérez	Cincinnati Reds
SS	Gene Alley	Pittsburgh Pirates	starter
OF	Hank Aaron	Atlanta Braves	starter
OF	Lou Brock	St. Louis Cardinals	starter
OF	Roberto Clemente	Pittsburgh Pirates	starter
OF	Willie Mays	San Francisco Giants
OF	Pete Rose	Cincinnati Reds
OF	Rusty Staub	Houston Astros
OF	Jimmy Wynn	Houston Astros

=== Coaching staff ===
Position	Manager	Team
Manager	Walter Alston	Los Angeles Dodgers
Coach	Herman Franks	San Francisco Giants
Coach	Harry Walker	Pittsburgh Pirates

== American League roster ==
Nine players, denoted in italics, would be inducted into the Baseball Hall of Fame.

=== Pitchers ===
Throws	Pitcher	Team	Notes
RH	Dean Chance	Minnesota Twins	starting pitcher
LH	Al Downing	New York Yankees
RH	Steve Hargan	Cleveland Indians	did not pitch
RH	Joe Horlen	Chicago White Sox	did not pitch
RH	Catfish Hunter	Kansas City Athletics
RH	Jim Lonborg	Boston Red Sox	did not pitch
RH	Jim McGlothlin	California Angels
LH	Gary Peters	Chicago White Sox

=== Position players ===
Position	Player	Team	Notes
C	Paul Casanova	Washington Senators	did not play
C	Andy Etchebarren	Baltimore Orioles	did not play
C	Bill Freehan	Detroit Tigers	starter
1B	Harmon Killebrew	Minnesota Twins	starter
1B	Mickey Mantle	New York Yankees
1B	Don Mincher	California Angels
2B	Rod Carew (R)	Minnesota Twins	starter
3B	Max Alvis	Cleveland Indians
3B	Brooks Robinson	Baltimore Orioles	starter
SS	Jim Fregosi	California Angels
SS	Dick McAuliffe	Detroit Tigers
SS	Rico Petrocelli	Boston Red Sox	starter
OF	Tommie Agee	Chicago White Sox
OF	Ken Berry	Chicago White Sox	replaced Frank Robinson on roster
OF	Tony Conigliaro	Boston Red Sox
OF	Al Kaline	Detroit Tigers	named to starting lineup, injured
OF	Tony Oliva	Minnesota Twins	replaced Al Kaline as starter
OF	Frank Robinson	Baltimore Orioles	named to starting lineup, injured
OF	Carl Yastrzemski	Boston Red Sox	replaced Frank Robinson as starter

=== Coaching staff ===
Position	Manager	Team
Manager	Hank Bauer	Baltimore Orioles
Coach	Bill Rigney	California Angels
Coach	Eddie Stanky	Chicago White Sox

(R) denotes a rookie player

== Starting lineups ==
The batting order was determined by each team's manager.

National League				American League			
Order	Player	Team	Position	Order	Player	Team	Position
1	Lou Brock	St. Louis Cardinals	LF	1	Brooks Robinson	Baltimore Orioles	3B
2	Roberto Clemente	Pittsburgh Pirates	RF	2	Rod Carew	Minnesota Twins	2B
3	Hank Aaron	Atlanta Braves	CF	3	Tony Oliva	Minnesota Twins	CF
4	Orlando Cepeda	St. Louis Cardinals	1B	4	Harmon Killebrew	Minnesota Twins	1B
5	Dick Allen	Philadelphia Phillies	3B	5	Tony Conigliaro	Boston Red Sox	RF
6	Joe Torre	Atlanta Braves	C	6	Carl Yastrzemski	Boston Red Sox	LF
7	Bill Mazeroski	Pittsburgh Pirates	2B	7	Bill Freehan	Detroit Tigers	C
8	Gene Alley	Pittsburgh Pirates	SS	8	Rico Petrocelli	Boston Red Sox	SS
9	Juan Marichal	San Francisco Giants	P	9	Dean Chance	Minnesota Twins	P

== Umpires ==
Position	Umpire
Home Plate	Ed Runge (AL)
First Base	Frank Secory (NL)
Second Base	Lou DiMuro (AL)
Third Base	Ken Burkhart (NL)
Left Field	Emmett Ashford (AL)
Right Field	Chris Pelekoudas (NL)

== Scoring summary ==
Tuesday, July 11, 1967 4:15 pm (PT) at Anaheim Stadium in Anaheim, California
Team	1	2	3	4	5	6	7	8	9	10	11	12	13	14	15	R	H	E
National League	0	1	0	0	0	0	0	0	0	0	0	0	0	0	1	2	9	0
American League	0	0	0	0	0	1	0	0	0	0	0	0	0	0	0	1	8	0
WP: Don Drysdale (1-0) LP: Catfish Hunter (0-1) Sv: Tom Seaver (1); Home runs: NL: Dick Allen (1), Tony Pérez (1); AL: Brooks Robinson (1)

The NL scored first when Dick Allen, the lead-off batter in the top of the second inning, hit a home run off of AL pitcher Dean Chance.

The AL tied the score in the bottom of the sixth inning. With one out, Brooks Robinson hit a home run off of NL relief pitcher Ferguson Jenkins. The score remained unchanged through the ninth inning, forcing the game into extra innings. In the top of the 15th inning, Tony Pérez hit a one-out home run off of AL pitcher Catfish Hunter, then in his fifth inning of relief, to give the NL a lead it would not relinquish.

== Game notes and records ==
Rod Carew became the first (and as of 2008, only) rookie second baseman to start an All-Star Game.

The two teams' pitching staffs combined for 30 strikeouts. Until 2008, this would be the All-Star Game record for most combined strikeouts in a single game. Each of the 12 pitchers used by both leagues had at least one strikeout with Ferguson Jenkins leading the way with six strikeouts in three innings of work.

One year after becoming the first African-American umpire in Major League history, Emmett Ashford became the first African-American umpire to work an All-Star Game.

The pregame ceremonies featured The Lennon Sisters singing the national anthem. The ceremonial first pitches were thrown by Red Ruffing and Lloyd Waner, who were inducted that year into the Baseball Hall Of Fame.
