= Ed Young (baseball) =

American baseball player

- First baseman
- Born: June 13, 1913; East St. Louis, Illinois, U.S.
- Died: August 3, 1967 (aged 54); Chicago, Illinois, U.S.
- Batted: Right Threw: Right

Negro league baseball debut
- 1938, for the Chicago American Giants

Last appearance
- 1947, for the Homestead Grays

Teams
- Chicago American Giants (1938–1943, 1946–1947); Homestead Grays (1947)

Edward Young (June 13, 1913 – August 3, 1967), nicknamed "Pep", was an American Negro league baseball first baseman who played in the 1930s and 1940s.

A native of Greenwood, Mississippi, Young made his Negro leagues debut in 1938 with the Chicago American Giants. He played eight seasons with Chicago, and also played for the Homestead Grays in 1947. Young died on August 3, 1967, at the age of 54.
