= Joe Cates =

American baseball player

- Shortstop
- Born: August 3, 1905; Madisonville, Kentucky, U.S.
- Died: October 13, 1967 (aged 62); Louisville, Kentucky, U.S.
- Threw: Right

Negro league baseball debut
- 1931, for the Louisville White Sox

Last appearance
- 1931, for the Louisville White Sox

Teams
- Louisville White Sox (1931)

Joseph Davis Cates (August 3, 1905 – October 13, 1967) was an American Negro league shortstop in the 1930s.

A native of Madisonville, Kentucky, Cates played for the Louisville White Sox in 1931. In 28 recorded games, he posted 21 hits in 107 plate appearances. Cates died in Louisville, Kentucky in 1967 at age 62.
