= George Culver =

American baseball player (born 1943)

- Pitcher
- Born: July 8, 1943 (age 83); Salinas, California, U.S.
- Batted: Right Threw: Right

MLB debut
- September 7, 1966, for the Cleveland Indians

Last MLB appearance
- June 9, 1974, for the Philadelphia Phillies

MLB statistics
- Win–loss record: 48–49
- Earned run average: 3.62
- Strikeouts: 451
- Stats at Baseball Reference

Teams
- Cleveland Indians (1966–1967); Cincinnati Reds (1968–1969); St. Louis Cardinals (1970); Houston Astros (1970–1972); Los Angeles Dodgers (1973); Philadelphia Phillies (1973–1974); Nippon-Ham Fighters (1975)

Career highlights and awards
- Pitched a no-hitter on July 29, 1968

George Raymond Culver (born July 8, 1943), is an American former professional baseball pitcher, who played in Major League Baseball (MLB) for the Cleveland Indians, Cincinnati Reds, St. Louis Cardinals, Houston Astros, Los Angeles Dodgers, and Philadelphia Phillies, from 1966 to 1974. He also pitched for the Nippon Professional Baseball (NPB) Nippon-Ham Fighters, in 1975.

== Early career ==
Culver was offered $1,000 to sign with the Phillies following an outstanding high school career at North High School in Bakersfield, California, where he played five sports. He turned that down and instead went to Bakersfield College and excelled in baseball for two years.

== Major league career ==
Culver was signed by the New York Yankees as an amateur free agent in 1963 for $2,500. He made his major league debut at age 23 on September 7, 1966, as the Cleveland Indians' starting pitcher against Jim Lonborg and the Boston Red Sox at Cleveland Municipal Stadium. Culver pitched five innings and gave up five earned runs in a 5–4 loss; the first-ever major league hitter he faced was José Tartabull.

Culver pitched a no-hitter for the Reds on July 29, 1968, in a 6–1 win over the Phillies at Philadelphia's Connie Mack Stadium. Culver struck out four batters and walked five as he outdueled Chris Short in game two of a doubleheader.

In 1973, Culver appeared in 28 games (all in relief) for the Los Angeles Dodgers, posting a 4–4 record and a 3.00 ERA before getting placed on waivers in August. Though Culver was the last pitcher on the Dodger depth chart, teammate Tommy John thought his dismissal was a big reason Los Angeles missed the playoffs in 1973. "George didn't get into a lot of games, but he held a vital role as team comic. His antics kept guys loose and kept us in a good frame of mind. When they released him... it upset the chemistry of the team. We couldn't believe it. It was like cutting out our heart."

== Minor league coach and manager ==
After retiring as a player, Culver spent 30 years as a minor league manager, pitching coordinator and pitching coach in the Dodgers and Phillies organizations. His last season in professional baseball was as a roving pitching coach for the Dodgers in 2010. On his last day as an active coach, the Bakersfield Blaze honored him with a "George Culver Retirement Night" on August 23, 2010.

== Personal life ==
For many years, Culver has been supporter of Bakersfield College (BC), which started when he began the BC Baseball Hot Stove Dinner as a means to upgrade the baseball facilities. The Hot Stove dinners generated over $1 million, which provided lights for the BC baseball field, a state-of-the-art clubhouse with showers, restrooms, laundry facilities, lockers, and coaches offices along with two new scoreboards and dugouts. His work in the Bakersfield community, especially through the nonprofit Light Brigade, has also helped raise money for the Cal State Bakersfield baseball program and local high schools and various youth baseball groups. He brought baseball to the Police Athletic League for inner-city kids in the Bakersfield area and has raised funds to purchase equipment and helped coach players in the PAL program.

In 2012, he was inducted into the California Community College Athletics Association Hall of Fame. He was previously inducted into Kern County's Bob Elias Hall of Fame and the Bakersfield College Alumni Hall of Fame.

Culver lives in Bakersfield, California, with his wife, Rosie. He has three adult stepchildren.

== See also ==
- List of Major League Baseball no-hitters

| Preceded by Catfish Hunter | No-hitter pitcher July 29, 1968 | Succeeded by Gaylord Perry |
