= 1967 Los Angeles Dodgers season =

1967 Los Angeles Dodgers
- League: National League
- Ballpark: Dodger Stadium
- City: Los Angeles, California
- Record: 73–89 (.451)
- Divisional place: 8th
- Owners: Walter O'Malley, James & Dearie Mulvey
- President: Walter O'Malley
- General managers: Buzzie Bavasi
- Managers: Walter Alston
- Television: KTTV (11)
- Radio: KFI; Vin Scully, Jerry Doggett; KWKW; José García, Jaime Jarrín

The 1967 Los Angeles Dodgers season was the 78th season for the Los Angeles Dodgers franchise in Major League Baseball (MLB), their 10th season in Los Angeles, California, and their 6th season playing their home games at Dodger Stadium in Los Angeles California. It marked the end of one of the franchise's most successful eras. One season after losing the World Series to the Baltimore Orioles, the Dodgers declined to a record of 73–89, and finished ahead of only the Houston Astros and the New York Mets in the National League race, 28 1/2 games behind the NL and World Series Champion St. Louis Cardinals. It was the Dodgers' worst record since the war-affected 1944 season, and their worst peacetime record since 1937. The Dodgers would not return to the postseason until 1974.

== Offseason ==
- November 21, 1966: Wes Covington was released by the Dodgers.
- November 29, 1966: Tommy Davis and Derrell Griffith were traded by the Dodgers to the New York Mets for Ron Hunt and Jim Hickman.
- December 1, 1966: Maury Wills was traded by the Dodgers to the Pittsburgh Pirates for Bob Bailey and Gene Michael.
- December 15, 1966: Nick Willhite was traded by the Dodgers to the California Angels for Bob Lee.

== Regular season ==
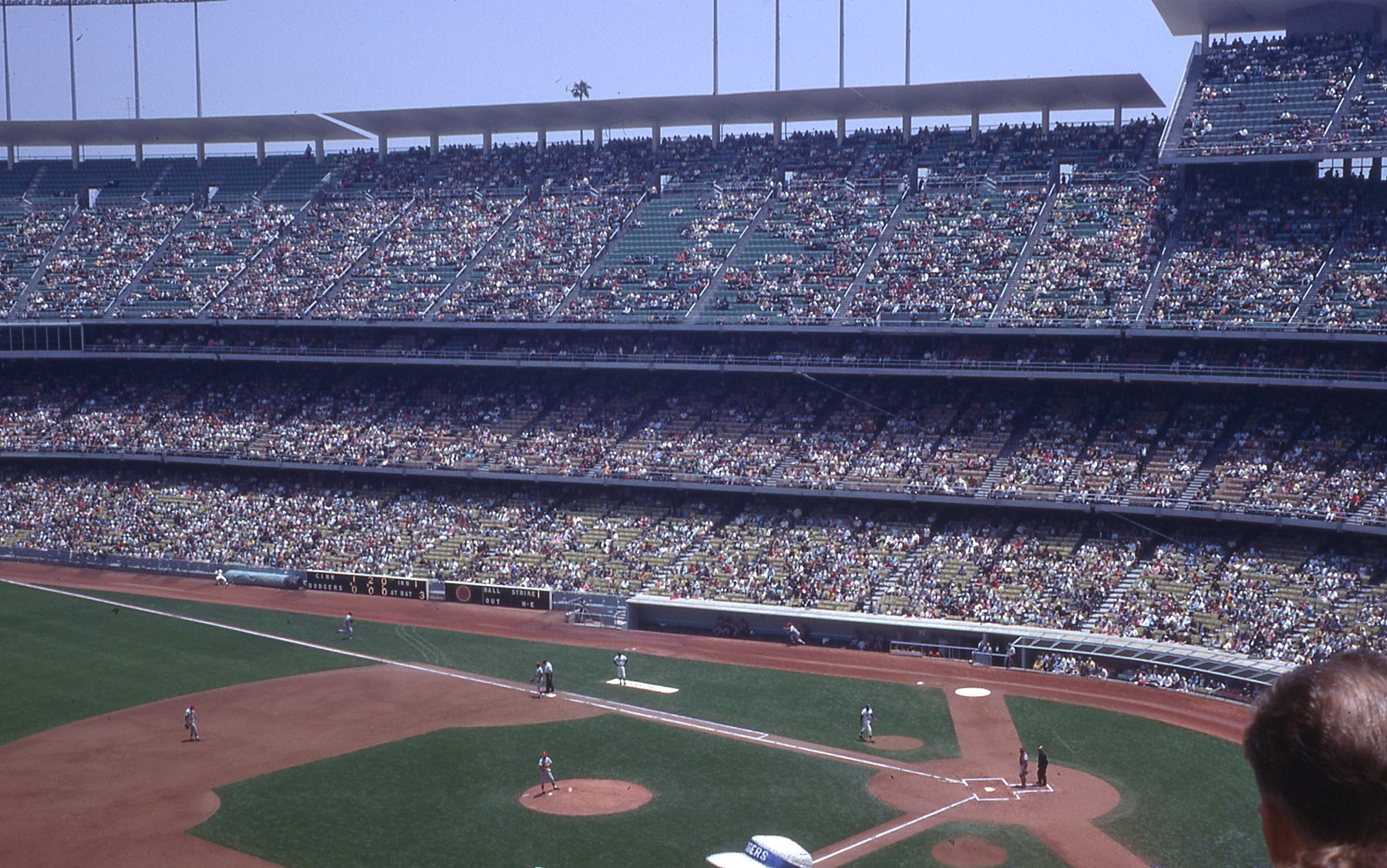
Dodgers vs. Reds at Dodger Stadium, 1967

=== Season standings ===
National League
Team	W	L	Pct.	GB	Home	Road
St. Louis Cardinals	101	60	.627	—	49‍–‍32	52‍–‍28
San Francisco Giants	91	71	.562	10½	51‍–‍31	40‍–‍40
Chicago Cubs	87	74	.540	14	49‍–‍34	38‍–‍40
Cincinnati Reds	87	75	.537	14½	49‍–‍32	38‍–‍43
Philadelphia Phillies	82	80	.506	19½	45‍–‍35	37‍–‍45
Pittsburgh Pirates	81	81	.500	20½	49‍–‍32	32‍–‍49
Atlanta Braves	77	85	.475	24½	48‍–‍33	29‍–‍52
Los Angeles Dodgers	73	89	.451	28½	42‍–‍39	31‍–‍50
Houston Astros	69	93	.426	32½	46‍–‍35	23‍–‍58
New York Mets	61	101	.377	40½	36‍–‍42	25‍–‍59

=== Record vs. opponents ===
1967 National League record Sources:
Team	ATL	CHC	CIN	HOU	LAD	NYM	PHI	PIT	SF	STL
Atlanta	—	11–7	5–13	11–7	8–10	8–10	10–8	8–10	10–8	6–12
Chicago	7–11	—	12–6	8–10	9–9	13–5	11–7	11–7–1	10–8	6–11
Cincinnati	13–5	6–12	—	15–3	8–10	12–6	10–8	10–8	8–10	5–13
Houston	7–11	10–8	3–15	—	10–8	11–7	7–11	9–9	6–12	6–12
Los Angeles	10–8	9–9	10–8	8–10	—	12–6	6–12	7–11	5–13	6–12
New York	10–8	5–13	6–12	7–11	6–12	—	4–14	11–7	5–13	7–11
Philadelphia	8-10	7–11	8–10	11–7	12–6	14–4	—	8–10	8–10	6–12
Pittsburgh	10–8	7–11–1	8–10	9–9	11–7	7–11	10–8	—	8–10	11–7
San Francisco	8–10	8–10	10–8	12–6	13–5	13–5	10–8	10–8	—	7–11
St. Louis	12–6	11–6	13–5	12–6	12–6	11–7	12–6	7–11	11–7	—

=== Opening Day lineup ===
Opening Day starters
Name	Position
Wes Parker	Center fielder
Ron Hunt	Second baseman
Lou Johnson	Right fielder
Ron Fairly	First baseman
Jim Lefebvre	Third baseman
John Roseboro	Catcher
Bob Bailey	Left fielder
Gene Michael	Shortstop
Bob Miller	Starting pitcher

=== Notable transactions ===
- April 3, 1967: John Kennedy was traded by the Dodgers to the New York Yankees for Jack Cullen, John Miller and cash.
- May 10, 1967: Johnny Werhas was traded by the Dodgers to the California Angels for Len Gabrielson.
- May 31, 1967: Bob Lee was purchased from the Dodgers by the Cincinnati Reds.
- June 28, 1967: Von Joshua was signed by the Dodgers as an amateur free agent.

=== Roster ===
1967 Los Angeles Dodgers
Roster
Pitchers: 21 Jim Brewer; 46 Bruce Brubaker; 53 Don Drysdale; 29 John Duffie; 37 Dick Egan; 44 Alan Foster; 39 Bob Lee; 15 Bob Miller; 38 Joe Moeller; 23 Claude Osteen; 16 Ron Perranoski; 27 Phil Regan; 40 Bill Singer; 20 Don Sutton	Catchers: 25 Jim Campanis; 8 John Roseboro; 10 Jeff Torborg; Infielders: 34 Luis Alcaraz; 12 Bob Bailey; 11 Tommy Dean; 33 Ron Hunt; 5 Jim Lefebvre; 26 Gene Michael; 17 Nate Oliver; 28 Wes Parker; 2 Dick Schofield	Outfielders: 43 Willie Crawford; 3 Willie Davis; 6 Ron Fairly; 9 Al Ferrara; 14 Len Gabrielson; 35 Jim Hickman; 41 Lou Johnson; Other batters: 14 Johnny Werhas	Manager: 24 Walter Alston; Coaches: 52 Carroll Beringer; 19 Jim Gilliam; 18 Preston Gómez; 22 Danny Ozark; 36 Lefty Phillips

== Season recap ==
The Dodgers were coming off back to back National League titles, but were mildly surprised by ace pitcher Sandy Koufax's retirement after the 1966 season. Still, while not expected to be a contender in 1967, there was a solid nucleus that would have been expected to win in the neighborhood of 85 games. However, a couple of questionable trades (Tommy Davis for Ron Hunt, and Maury Wills for Bob Bailey and Gene Michael) further weakened an offense that was already considered below average.

In April, leading hitter and team home run leader Lou Johnson was injured sliding into home against the Braves and missed two months of the season. New shortstop Gene Michael batted .202, a full 100 points less than the man he replaced, as Maury Wills batted .302 for the Pirates. Ron Fairly, Willie Davis, and Bob Bailey all slumped off from their 1966 production; but one of the few bright spots was rookie Al Ferrara's .277 average and 16 home runs in just over half the season. Ultimately, the Dodgers scored fewer runs than any National League team except the last place Mets.

Despite the loss of Koufax, the pitching was generally solid, but the starters' won-loss records suffered from lack of run support despite solid ERAs. Rookie Bill Singer was 12–8 with a 2.64 ERA, Don Drysdale was 13–16 with a 2.74 ERA, and Claude Osteen was 17–17 with a 3.22 ERA. Don Sutton suffered from a "sophomore jinx", as he went 11–15 with a 3.95 ERA, nearly a full run higher than his 2.99 ERA in 1966. The bullpen was led by Ron Perranoski, Jim Brewer, and Phil Regan, who combined for 23 saves and all had an ERA under 3.

The Dodgers lost 10 of their first 16 games and never got closer than 7 games out of 1st place. They were never able to top the .500 mark, and while they were a respectable 42–39 at home, they were a dismal 31–50 on the road.

=== Batting ===
==== Starters by position ====
Note: Pos = Position; G = Games played; AB = At bats; H = Hits; Avg. = Batting average; HR = Home runs; RBI = Runs batted in

Pos	Player	G	AB	H	Avg.	HR	RBI
C	John Roseboro	116	334	91	.272	4	24
1B	Wes Parker	139	496	102	.247	5	31
2B	Ron Hunt	110	388	102	.263	3	33
SS	Gene Michael	98	223	45	.202	0	7
3B	Jim Lefebvre	136	494	129	.261	8	50
LF	Lou Johnson	104	330	89	.270	11	41
CF	Willie Davis	143	569	146	.257	6	41
RF	Ron Fairly	153	486	107	.220	10	55

==== Other batters ====
Note: G = Games played; AB = At bats; H = Hits; Avg. = Batting average; HR = Home runs; RBI = Runs batted in

Player	G	AB	H	Avg.	HR	RBI
Al Ferrara	122	347	96	.277	16	50
Bob Bailey	116	322	73	.227	4	28
Len Gabrielson	90	238	62	.261	7	29
Dick Schofield	84	232	50	.216	2	15
Nate Oliver	77	232	55	.237	0	7
Jeff Torborg	76	196	42	.214	2	12
Jim Hickman	65	98	16	.163	0	10
Jim Campanis	41	62	10	.161	2	2
Luis Alcaraz	17	60	14	.233	0	3
Tommy Dean	12	28	4	.143	0	2
Johnny Werhas	7	7	1	.143	0	0
Willie Crawford	4	4	1	.250	0	0

=== Pitching ===
==== Starting pitchers ====
Note: G = Games pitched; IP = Innings pitched; W = Wins; L = Losses; ERA = Earned run average; SO = Strikeouts

Player	G	IP	W	L	ERA	SO
Claude Osteen	39	288.1	17	17	3.22	152
Don Drysdale	38	282.0	13	16	2.74	196
Don Sutton	37	232.2	11	15	3.95	169
Bill Singer	32	204.1	12	8	2.64	169
John Duffie	2	9.2	0	2	2.79	6

==== Other pitchers ====
Note: G = Games pitched; IP = Innings pitched; W = Wins; L = Losses; ERA = Earned run average; SO = Strikeouts

Player	G	IP	W	L	ERA	SO
Jim Brewer	30	100.2	5	4	2.68	74
Alan Foster	4	16.2	0	1	2.16	15

==== Relief pitchers ====
Note: G = Games pitched; W = Wins; L = Losses; SV = Saves; ERA = Earned run average; SO = Strikeouts

Player	G	W	L	SV	ERA	SO
Ron Perranoski	70	6	7	16	2.45	75
Phil Regan	55	6	9	6	2.99	53
Bob Miller	52	2	9	0	4.31	32
Dick Egan	20	1	1	0	6.25	20
Joe Moeller	6	0	0	0	9.00	2
Bob Lee	4	0	0	0	5.40	2
Jim Hickman	1	0	0	0	4.50	0
Bruce Brubaker	1	0	0	0	20.25	2

== Awards and honors ==
- Gold Glove Award
  - Wes Parker, outfield

=== All-Stars ===
- 1967 Major League Baseball All-Star Game
  - Don Drysdale reserve
  - Claude Osteen reserve

== Farm system ==
Level	Team	League	Manager
AAA	Spokane Indians	Pacific Coast League	Roy Hartsfield
AA	Albuquerque Dodgers	Texas League	Duke Snider
A	Santa Barbara Dodgers	California League	Norm Sherry
A	Dubuque Packers	Midwest League	Bill Berrier
A	Tri-City Atoms	Northwest League	Don LeJohn
Rookie	Ogden Dodgers	Pioneer League	Tommy Lasorda

LEAGUE CHAMPIONS: Albuquerque, Ogden

== 1967 Major League Baseball draft ==
This was the third year of a Major League Baseball draft. The Dodgers drafted 87 players in the June draft and nine in the January draft, six of them would eventually play in MLB. The top draft pick was third baseman Donnie Denbow from Southern Methodist University. He played in the Dodgers farm system through 1970. In 177 games in the rookie leagues and Class-A, he hit .242.

Of this years draft class, only catcher Steve Yeager, drafted in the fourth round, made any impact in the Majors. He played with the Dodgers from 1972 to 1985 and hit 102 home runs during his career.

1967 draft picks

January draft
Round	Name	Position	School	Signed	Career span	Highest level
1	Travis King	RHP	South Georgia College	Yes	1967–1972	AA
2	James Herbert	LHP	Southern University and A&M College	No		

January secondary phase
Round	Name	Position	School	Signed	Career span	Highest level
1	Larry Burchart	RHP	Oklahoma State University	No; Dodgers – 1967 June	1967–1971	MLB
2	James Doran	OF	Staunton Military Academy	Yes	1967–1968	A-
3	Jeffrey Bowman	RHP	Modesto Junior College	No		
4	Maurice Smith	C	University of Illinois at Urbana–Champaign	Yes	1967	A-
5	Paul DeVaney	RHP	Rochester Business Institute	Yes	1967–1968	A-
6	Michael Babler	RHP	Chabot College	No		
7	Eldon Jones	LHP	Trinidad State Junior College	No; Athletics – 1970	1970–1973	AA

June draft
Round	Name	Position	School	Signed	Career span	Highest level
1	Donnie Denbow	3B	Southern Methodist University	Yes	1966–1971	A
2	Thomas Harris	SS	Central Gwinnett High School	Yes	1967–1971	A
3	William Rainer	OF	Southern Methodist University	Yes	1967–1968	A
4	Steve Yeager	C	Meadowdale High School	Yes	1967–1986	MLB
5	Ron Cash	SS	Lakeside High School	No; Tigers – 1971	1971–1976	MLB
6	Kenneth Hansen	RHP	Maryvale High School	No; Reds – 1971	1971–1973	AA
7	Rusty Bodkin	OF	Fort Lauderdale High School	No; Cardinals – 1968	1967–1971	A
8	Leland Saxon	LHP	Palmetto High School	Yes	1967–1968	Rookie
9	Gary Wedel	3B	Gardena High School	Yes	1967–1970	A
10	Carmine Marceno	1B	Christopher Columbus High School	Yes	1967–1970	A
11	Charles Boggs	C	West Virginia University	Yes	1967–1968	A
12	Robert Lamber	LHP	New York City College of Technology	Yes	1967	Rookie
13	Kara Hall	INF	Dos Palos High School	Yes	1967–1971	A
14	James Loll	1B	Crespi Carmelite High School	No; Royals – 1969	1969	Rookie
15	Glenn Woodruff	C	Aliceville High School	No; Indians – 1972	1972–1974	AA
16	Jack Donovan	RHP	St. Peter's High School	No; Angels – 1971	1971–1975	AAA
17	Robert Knight	2B	King High School	No; Cubs – 1969	1969–1970	A
18	Don Stoulil	3B	Bishop Alemany High School	Yes	1968–1971	A
19	Abraham Sears	SS	Perry High School	Yes	1967–1968	A
20	Larry King	RHP	Willingham High School	Yes	1967	Rookie
21	Bruce Matte	RHP	Miami University	No; Mets – 1968	1968–1970	A
22	Leon Murray	1B	Fremont High School	No; Giants – 1970	1970	Rookie
23	Malcolm Bass	2B	Gulf Coast Community College	Yes	1967	A-
24	Norman Dermody	RHP	Seton Hall University	Yes	1967–1970	AA
25	James Hughes	SS	Okawville High School	Yes	1967	Rookie
26	James Norton	C	Bishop Alemany High School	No		
27	Mike Rapkin	LHP	Monroe High School	No		
28	Gregory Smith	RHP	Sierra High School	No		
29	Jim Flynn	RHP	Roosevelt High School	Yes	1967–1973	AAA
30	James Brunnworth	RHP	Edwardsville High School	Yes	1967–1971	AA
31	Ronald Thompson	RHP	Roosevelt High School	No		
32	Dave Thompson	OF	Santa Barbara High School	No; Angels −1968	1968–1969	A
33	John Brannigan	LHP	Cliffside Park High School	No		
34	Robert Huellemeier	RHP	Mount de Sales High School	No		
35	William Wright	C	Carson-Newman College	No		
36	Chava Flores	SS	Artesia High School	Yes	1968	Rookie
37	Greg Mattinson	OF	Grossmont College	No		
38	Charles Kingsbury	3B	Claremont High School	No		
39	Willie Strickland	OF	Fremont High School	No		
40	Gene Martin	3B	Santa Monica High School	No		
41	Larry Tingle	RHP	Yerington High School	Yes	1967–1969	A
42	Douglas Barker	RHP	Davis High School	No; Phillies – 1969	1969–1971	A
43	Dennis Murphy	RHP	Southwest Miami High School	Yes	1967–1969	A
44	James O'Brien	OF	Sacred Heart University	No		
45	Phillip Cabibi	2B	Garey High School	No		
46	James Southworth	RHP	Los Angeles Valley College	No; Senators – 1970	1970–1972	AAA
47	Gene Willetts	C	Johnson & Wales University	No		
48	William Susa	RHP	Reseda High School	No		A
49	Steven Napoli	OF	Bishop Alemany High School	No		
50	John Marino	C	Los Angeles Valley College	No		
51	David Conway	OF	Los Angeles Valley College	Yes	1967–1968	A
52	William Graves	RHP	Westmont College	Yes	1967–1970	AA
53	Harold Armstrong	SS	Hueneme High School	No		
54	Stephen Lee	LHP	Monroe High School	No; Giants – 1971	1971	A
55	Joseph Jacobsen	C	Roosevelt High School	No; Twins −1969	1969–1972	A
56	Michael McPartlin	3B	Niagara County Community College	No		
57	David Dale	RHP	Culver Military Academy High School	No		
58	Stephen Easton	LHP	Sierra High School	No; Athletics – 1971	1971–1973	AA
59	David Lloyd	OF	Jefferson High School	No		
60	Patrick Manahan	3B	Sylmar High School	Yes	1967–1970	A
61	Albert Rossi	2B	St. Francis High School	No		
62	Frank Rucker	LHP	Ensley High School	No		
63	Bruce Ellingsen	LHP	Lakewood High School	Yes	1968–1975	MLB
64	Francis Karmelich	C	Felix Lasuen High School	No; Senators – 1970	1970–1972	A
65	Tom Lundstedt	C	Prospect High School	No; Cubs – 1970	1970–1975	MLB
66	Antonio Latour	LHP	Indian River Community College	No		
67	Craig Fox	LHP		No		
68	Barton Bell	2B	Mesa Community College	SELECTION VOIDED		
69	Harold Murray	C	Smith-Cotton High School	No		
70	Keith Lieppman	SS	Southwest High School	No; Athletics – 1971	1971–1979	AAA

June secondary phase
Round	Name	Position	School	Signed	Career span	Highest level
1	Pat Brown	OF	University of Texas at Austin	No; Yankees – 1969	1969–1971	AA
2	Robert Bosson	1B	Columbia University	No		
3	Larry Burchart	RHP	Oklahoma State University	Yes	1967–1971	MLB
4	Raldolph Kohn	C	University of Georgia	Yes	1967–1970	A
5	Samuel Scheschuk	C	University of Texas at Austin	Yes	1967	A-
6	Jack Creel	RHP	Gulf Coast Community College	Yes	1867–1968	A
7	David Speas	3B	San Diego Mesa College	Yes	1967–1969	A
8	Walter Adey	LHP	Hudson Valley Community College	Yes	1967–1971	A
9	Jom Keirns	OF	Central State University	No		
10	Lucky Thompson	SS	University of California, San Diego	No; Cardinals – 1968	1968–1971	AA
11	Clarence Cleveland	OF	Chipola College	No; Phillies – 1971	1971	Rookie
12	Larry Linville	OF	Arizona State University	No; White Sox – 1968	1968–1971	A
13	Patrick O'Brien	LHP	University of Arizona	No		
14	Bruce Wade	RHP	El Camino College	No		
15	Richard Binder	LHP	University of Illinois at Urbana-Champaign	No		
16	Douglas Brittele	RHP	Rutgers, the State University of New Jersey	No		
17	Glenn Bisbing	3B	Rider University	No; Reds – 1968	1968–1969	A
