= 1967 Cincinnati Reds season =

1967 Cincinnati Reds
- League: National League
- Ballpark: Crosley Field
- City: Cincinnati
- Record: 87–75 (.537)
- League place: 4th
- Owners: Francis L. Dale
- General managers: Bob Howsam
- Managers: Dave Bristol
- Television: WLWT (Ed Kennedy, Frank McCormick)
- Radio: WCKY (Jim McIntyre, Claude Sullivan, Joe Nuxhall)

The 1967 Cincinnati Reds season was the 98th season for the franchise in Major League Baseball. The Reds finished in fourth place in the National League with a record of 87–75, 14 1/2 games behind the NL and World Series Champion St. Louis Cardinals. The Reds were managed by Dave Bristol and played their home games at Crosley Field. This was the first season that the Reds wore their now famous Big Red Machine era uniforms. The uniforms themselves would see minor tweaks throughout the years. By the next season, the red pinstripes were removed and in 1972, the uniforms became pullovers and no longer had buttons. This variant would stay for the rest of its tenure until the uniform was retired all together following the 1992 season after 26 years.

== Regular season ==
On August 28, Johnny Bench made his major league debut at age 19.

=== Season standings ===
National League
Team	W	L	Pct.	GB	Home	Road
St. Louis Cardinals	101	60	.627	—	49‍–‍32	52‍–‍28
San Francisco Giants	91	71	.562	10½	51‍–‍31	40‍–‍40
Chicago Cubs	87	74	.540	14	49‍–‍34	38‍–‍40
Cincinnati Reds	87	75	.537	14½	49‍–‍32	38‍–‍43
Philadelphia Phillies	82	80	.506	19½	45‍–‍35	37‍–‍45
Pittsburgh Pirates	81	81	.500	20½	49‍–‍32	32‍–‍49
Atlanta Braves	77	85	.475	24½	48‍–‍33	29‍–‍52
Los Angeles Dodgers	73	89	.451	28½	42‍–‍39	31‍–‍50
Houston Astros	69	93	.426	32½	46‍–‍35	23‍–‍58
New York Mets	61	101	.377	40½	36‍–‍42	25‍–‍59

=== Record vs. opponents ===
1967 National League record Sources:
Team	ATL	CHC	CIN	HOU	LAD	NYM	PHI	PIT	SF	STL
Atlanta	—	11–7	5–13	11–7	8–10	8–10	10–8	8–10	10–8	6–12
Chicago	7–11	—	12–6	8–10	9–9	13–5	11–7	11–7–1	10–8	6–11
Cincinnati	13–5	6–12	—	15–3	8–10	12–6	10–8	10–8	8–10	5–13
Houston	7–11	10–8	3–15	—	10–8	11–7	7–11	9–9	6–12	6–12
Los Angeles	10–8	9–9	10–8	8–10	—	12–6	6–12	7–11	5–13	6–12
New York	10–8	5–13	6–12	7–11	6–12	—	4–14	11–7	5–13	7–11
Philadelphia	8-10	7–11	8–10	11–7	12–6	14–4	—	8–10	8–10	6–12
Pittsburgh	10–8	7–11–1	8–10	9–9	11–7	7–11	10–8	—	8–10	11–7
San Francisco	8–10	8–10	10–8	12–6	13–5	13–5	10–8	10–8	—	7–11
St. Louis	12–6	11–6	13–5	12–6	12–6	11–7	12–6	7–11	11–7	—

=== Notable transactions ===
- June 6, 1967: Chris Chambliss was drafted by the Reds in the 31st round of the 1967 Major League Baseball draft, but did not sign.

=== Roster ===
1967 Cincinnati Reds
Roster
Pitchers: 33 Ted Abernathy; 35 Gerry Arrigo; 27 Jack Baldschun; 56 Ted Davidson; 32 Sammy Ellis; 48 Bob Lee; 46 Jim Maloney; 42 Billy McCool; 38 Gary Nolan; 43 Don Nottebart; 32 Darrell Osteen; 34 Milt Pappas; 22 Mel Queen; 37 John Tsitouris	Catchers: 5 Johnny Bench; 7 Jimmie Coker; 6 Johnny Edwards; 8 Don Pavletich; Infielders: 40 Len Boehmer; 16 Leo Cárdenas; 18 Gordy Coleman; 19 Tommy Helms; 11 Deron Johnson; 23 Lee May; 24 Tony Pérez; 15 Chico Ruiz	Outfielders: 17 Tommy Harper; 28 Vada Pinson; 25 Floyd Robinson; 14 Pete Rose; 12 Art Shamsky; 20 Dick Simpson; 45 Jake Wood	Manager: 4 Dave Bristol; Coaches: 10 Vern Benson (Third base); 2 Jim Bragan (First base); 3 Mel Harder (Pitching); 13 Ray Shore; 9 Whitey Wietelmann (Bullpen)

== Player stats ==
= Indicates team leader

=== Batting ===
==== Starters by position ====
Note: Pos = Position; G = Games played; AB = At bats; H = Hits; Avg. = Batting average; HR = Home runs; RBI = Runs batted in

Pos	Player	G	AB	H	Avg.	HR	RBI
C	Johnny Edwards	80	209	43	.206	2	20
1B	Deron Johnson	108	361	81	.224	13	53
2B	Tommy Helms	137	497	136	.274	2	35
SS	Leo Cárdenas	108	379	97	.256	2	21
3B	Tony Pérez	156	600	174	.290	26	102
LF	Pete Rose	148	585	176	.301	12	76
CF	Vada Pinson	158	650	187	.288	18	66
RF	Tommy Harper	103	365	82	.225	7	22

==== Other batters ====
Note: G = Games played; AB = At bats; H = Hits; Avg. = Batting average; HR = Home runs; RBI = Runs batted in

Player	G	AB	H	Avg.	HR	RBI
Lee May	127	438	116	.265	12	57
Chico Ruiz	105	250	55	.220	0	13
Don Pavletich	74	231	55	.238	6	34
Art Shamsky	76	147	29	.197	3	13
Floyd Robinson	55	130	31	.238	1	10
Jimmie Coker	45	97	18	.186	2	4
Johnny Bench	26	86	14	.163	1	6
Dick Simpson	44	54	14	.259	1	6
Jake Wood	16	17	2	.118	0	1
Gordy Coleman	4	7	0	.000	0	0
Len Boehmer	2	3	0	.000	0	0

=== Pitching ===
= Indicates league leader

==== Starting pitchers ====
Note: G = Games pitched; IP = Innings pitched; W = Wins; L = Losses; ERA = Earned run average; SO = Strikeouts

Player	G	IP	W	L	ERA	SO
Gary Nolan	33	226.2	14	8	2.58	206
Milt Pappas	34	217.2	16	13	3.35	129
Jim Maloney	30	196.1	15	11	3.25	153
Mel Queen	32	195.2	14	8	2.76	154
Sammy Ellis	32	175.2	8	11	3.84	80

==== Other pitchers ====
Note: G = Games pitched; IP = Innings pitched; W = Wins; L = Losses; ERA = Earned run average; SO = Strikeouts

Player	G	IP	W	L	ERA	SO
Billy McCool	31	97.1	3	7	3.42	83
Gerry Arrigo	32	74.0	6	6	3.16	56
John Tsitouris	2	8.0	1	0	3.38	4

==== Relief pitchers ====
Note: G = Games pitched; W = Wins; L = Losses; SV = Saves; ERA = Earned run average; SO = Strikeouts

Player	G	W	L	SV	ERA	SO
Ted Abernathy	70	6	3	28	1.27	88
Don Nottebart	47	0	3	4	1.93	48
Bob Lee	27	3	3	3	4.44	33
Darrell Osteen	10	0	2	2	6.28	13
Jack Baldschun	9	0	0	0	4.15	12
Ted Davidson	9	1	0	0	4.15	6

== Awards and honors ==
All-Star Game

- Tommy Helms, Reserve
- Tony Perez, Reserve
- Pete Rose, Reserve

== Farm system ==
Level	Team	League	Manager
AAA	Buffalo Bisons	International League	Lou Fitzgerald and Don Zimmer
AA	Knoxville Smokies	Southern League	Don Zimmer and Lou Fitzgerald
A	Tampa Tarpons	Florida State League	George Scherger
A-Short Season	Sioux Falls Packers	Northern League	Jim Snyder
Rookie	Wytheville Reds	Appalachian League	Scott Breeden
