= Jake Hager =

American wrestler & MMA fighter (born 1982)

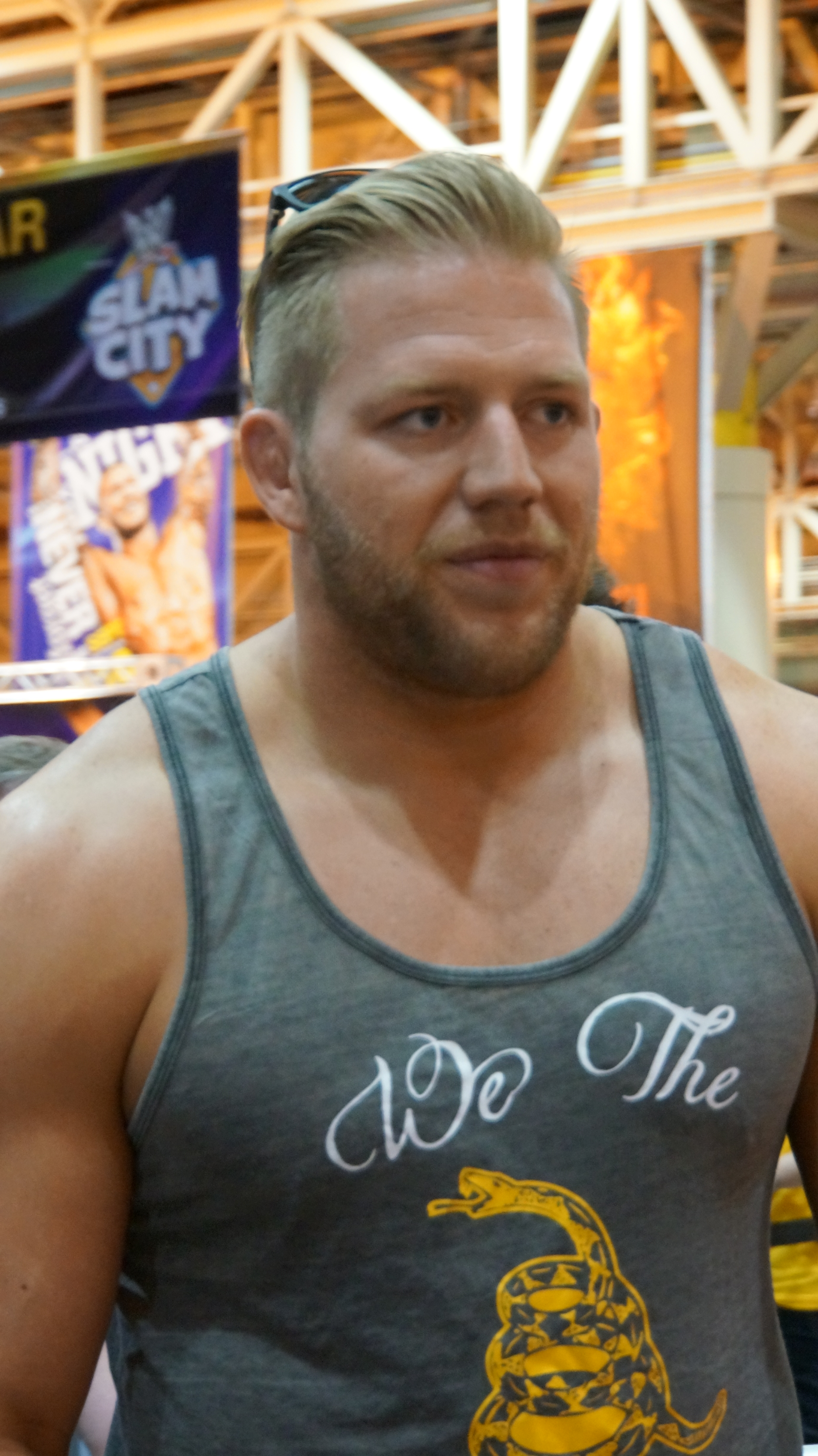
- Hager in April 2014

Personal information
- Born: Donald Jacob Hager Jr. March 24, 1982 (age 44) Fargo, North Dakota, U.S.
- Education: University of Oklahoma
- Spouse: Catalina White (m. 2010; div. 2024)
- Children: 2

Professional wrestling career
- Ring name(s): Jack Swagger; Jake Hager; Jake Strong
- Billed height: 6 ft 7 in (201 cm)
- Billed weight: 275 lb (125 kg)
- Billed from: Perry, Oklahoma
- Trained by: Bill DeMott; Deep South Wrestling; Jody Hamilton
- Debut: September 7, 2006
- Martial arts career
- Nickname: Rock Hard
- Height: 6 ft 4 in (193 cm)
- Weight: 255 lb (116 kg; 18 st 3 lb)
- Division: Heavyweight (206–265 lbs)
- Reach: 81 in (206 cm)
- Style: Wrestling
- Fighting out of: Tampa, Florida, United States
- Wrestling: NCAA Division I All-American

Mixed martial arts record
- Total: 4
- Wins: 3
- By submission: 2
- By decision: 1
- Losses: 0
- No contests: 1

Other information
- Mixed martial arts record from Sherdog

Donald Jacob Hager Jr. (born March 24, 1982) is an American slap fighter, semi-retired professional wrestler, retired amateur wrestler, and mixed martial artist. He is best known for his tenures in WWE as Jack Swagger and in All Elite Wrestling (AEW) as Jake Hager. As a mixed martial artist, he was signed to Bellator MMA and competed in the heavyweight division.

Hager attended the University of Oklahoma as a two-sport athlete, participating in both football and wrestling. He switched to wrestling full-time in his sophomore year, and in 2006, set the record for most pins in a season with 30 as an All-American. Following a try-out, Hager signed a WWE contract in mid 2006 where he performed as Jack Swagger. During his time with WWE, he became a two-time world champion, having held the WWE's World Heavyweight Championship and the ECW Championship once each and a one-time United States Champion. He left the company in 2017 after he decided to pursue a professional mixed martial arts (MMA) career.

In 2017, Hager signed with Bellator MMA. He had his first professional fight on January 26, 2019, against J.W. Kiser at Bellator 214, where he won via arm-triangle choke in the first round. In his second fight with the promotion, he faced T.J. Jones on May 11, 2019, at Bellator 221, where he again won via arm-triangle choke in the first round. Hager announced his retirement from MMA in September 2023. He was undefeated with a record of 3–0 (1). As a wrestler, he kept working with various promotions before signing with AEW in 2019, including in Lucha Underground as Jake Strong, where he was the final Lucha Underground Champion.

== Early life and amateur wrestling career ==
Hager started wrestling at the age of five. He wrestled in high school with Danny Hodge's grandson and remained good friends with Hodge as he grew up living two blocks away from him in Perry, Oklahoma. During his Junior year In 2000 Hager won an OSSAA 2A state championship in the 215 pound division. Throughout high school he was also a member of the National Honor Society and served as a class officer three times.

The University of Oklahoma recruited Hager as a two-sport athlete in football and wrestling. He was the second-string defensive tackle behind eventual National Football League players Tommie Harris and Dusty Dvoracek. He stopped playing football and concentrated fully on wrestling his sophomore year. During his junior year, he was introduced to Jim Ross, who was World Wrestling Entertainment (WWE)'s Head of Talent Relations at the time, through former OU defensive tackle Dusty Dvoracek, Hager's close friend and college roommate. Ross encouraged Hager to contact him after graduating to see about a career in professional wrestling.

At the 2005 NCAA Division I championships, he lost to University of Pennsylvania's Matt Feast in the second round, and did not place. As a senior in 2006, Hager had a seventh-place finish in the NCAA championships and also defeated the future national champion, Dustin Fox from Northwestern University. Hager was named an All-American at season's end while setting the Oklahoma record for most pins in a single season with 30.

In 2006, Hager graduated from the University of Oklahoma with a Bachelor's degree in finance. Following his graduation, he was going to work with a firm in Dallas, Texas, but signed with WWE after they offered a contract the day he was scheduled to start.

== Professional wrestling career ==
=== World Wrestling Entertainment / WWE (2006–2017) ===
==== Developmental territories (2006–2008) ====
In 2006, Hager had a WWE tryout in Deep South Wrestling (DSW), and in September 2006, under his real name, he made his in-ring debut for DSW, defeating Antonio Mestre in a dark match.

He competed mainly in dark matches before being moved to Ohio Valley Wrestling (OVW) in January 2007. He debuted for the promotion by defeating Atlas DaBone, and in the following months began a feud with K.C. James. Hager began teaming with a multitude of opponents to feud with James and his tag team partner Cassidy James. During his time in the developmental territories he appeared as a security guard during a brawl between John Cena and Umaga on Raw.

In August 2007, Hager was reassigned to Florida Championship Wrestling (FCW), where he began a feud with TJ Wilson. On February 15, 2008, at the Florida State Fair in Tampa, Florida, Hager and Ted DiBiase Jr. were the final two men remaining in a 23-man battle royal to determine the two contenders for the FCW Florida Heavyweight Championship. Hager then defeated DiBiase to become champion. On March 22, 2008, Hager went against the FCW Southern Heavyweight Champion Heath Miller in New Port Richey, Florida to determine the true Heavyweight Champion. Both championships were on the line, and Hager defeated Miller to become the undisputed heavyweight champion in FCW. He later defended the championship against Miller, TJ Wilson, James Curtis, and Gabe Tuft.

During this time, Hager had a gimmick of having an undefeated streak in FCW. His first loss came in the form of a Raw dark match, at the TV taping on August 18, 2008, when he lost to William Regal. He also lost to D'Lo Brown in a dark match, before defeating Jamie Noble in a dark match prior to a SmackDown taping on August 29. He then lost the FCW Florida Heavyweight Championship to Sheamus O'Shaunessy on September 18, after debuting for the ECW brand.

==== Championship reigns (2008–2010) ====
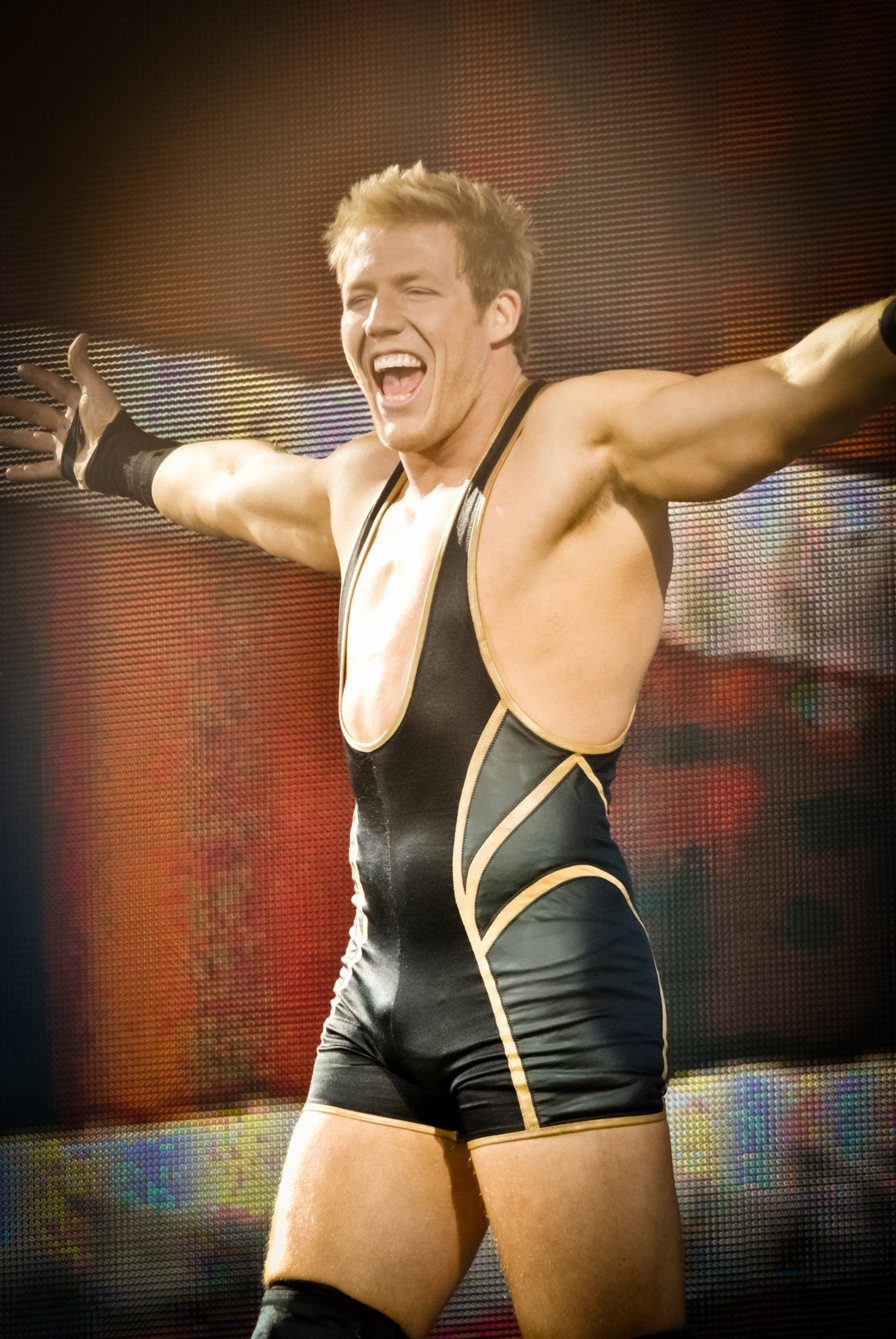
Swagger at Tribute to the Troops in December 2010

On September 9, 2008, Hager made his debut on the ECW brand as a heel under the ring name Jack Swagger, winning a match against a local competitor. He immediately started a feud with Tommy Dreamer. He attacked Dreamer on the September 23 episode of ECW when Dreamer attempted to stop Swagger from attacking Chase Stevens. He later defeated Dreamer in a normal match and an "Amateur Wrestling Challenge" competition. After weeks of feuding, their rivalry ended in November in an Extreme Rules match, which Swagger won.

He then sought to challenge Matt Hardy for the ECW Championship and was named the #1 contender on the December 30 episode of ECW. On the January 13, 2009 episode of ECW, Swagger defeated Hardy to win his first title in WWE, the ECW Championship, and retained the title against Hardy in a rematch at the Royal Rumble on January 25. His undefeated streak in singles competition ended on the February 3 episode of ECW when he lost to Finlay in a non-title match. After successfully defending his title against Finlay at No Way Out on February 15, Swagger began a feud with the returning Christian. He lost the ECW Championship to Christian at Backlash on April 26, ending his reign at 104 days. He attempted to regain the title against Christian at Judgment Day on May 17 and in a triple threat hardcore match at Extreme Rules on June 7 also involving Dreamer but was unsuccessful in both attempts. His attempt to win the ECW Championship at The Bash on June 28 in an ECW Championship Scramble also failed.

On the June 29 episode of Raw, Swagger was traded to the Raw brand, making his debut as part of a three-on-one gauntlet match against WWE Champion Randy Orton, in which he got himself purposely counted out in order to make an impression on Orton. On the July 13 episode of Raw, he won his first match on the brand by defeating Montel Vontavious Porter (MVP). He then feuded with MVP for several weeks, culminating at SummerSlam on August 23, in a match that MVP won. After his short feud with MVP ended, Swagger began pursuing the United States Championship. He had a title match on the September 21 episode of Raw against Kofi Kingston but lost the match by countout after stealing the championship belt and leaving the arena with it but Kingston later took it back while Swagger was in a physical confrontation with The Miz. Swagger made another unsuccessful attempt at the title at Hell in a Cell on October 4 in a triple threat match against Kingston and The Miz. At the Royal Rumble on January 31, 2010, Swagger entered at number 26 in the Royal Rumble match, but was later eliminated by Kofi Kingston.

On the March 1 episode of Raw, Swagger defeated Santino Marella to qualify for the Money in the Bank ladder match at WrestleMania XXVI on March 28, where he won, earning a contract for any WWE world championship over the following year. On the March 29 episode of Raw, Swagger tried to cash in his Money in the Bank contract against the WWE Champion John Cena, but changed his mind when he realized that Cena was not incapacitated enough to be defeated easily. As the match had never started, Swagger retained the contract for use at a future date.

Swagger cashed in the contract during the April 2 episode of SmackDown, after then World Heavyweight Champion Chris Jericho had been speared by Edge. Swagger went on to defeat Jericho to win the World Heavyweight Championship for the first time and subsequently joined the SmackDown brand. Following his championship win, Swagger began to develop a more serious persona: previously he had been known for doing pushups and beating his chest during his ring entrance. He successfully defended the title against Edge and Jericho in a triple threat match on the April 16 episode of SmackDown and against Randy Orton in an Extreme Rules match at Extreme Rules on April 25. At Over the Limit on May 23, Swagger retained the title against Big Show by intentionally disqualifying himself. At Fatal 4-Way on June 20, Swagger lost the World Heavyweight Championship to Rey Mysterio in a fatal four-way match also involving CM Punk and Big Show, ending his world championship reign at 79 days. Following the Fatal 4-Way pay-per-view, Swagger began attacking Mysterio in the lead up to his rematch at the Money in the Bank pay-per-view on July 18. He failed to regain the championship, ending their short feud and Swagger's main event status. The match was called one of the best that year.

Swagger later began being accompanied to the ring by his mascot, the Swagger Soaring Eagle, who was portrayed by Chavo Guerrero. At TLC: Tables, Ladders and Chairs on December 19, Swagger competed in a triple threat ladder match for the Intercontinental Championship against Kofi Kingston and champion Dolph Ziggler, in which Ziggler retained.

==== Teaming with Dolph Ziggler; United States Champion (2011–2012) ====
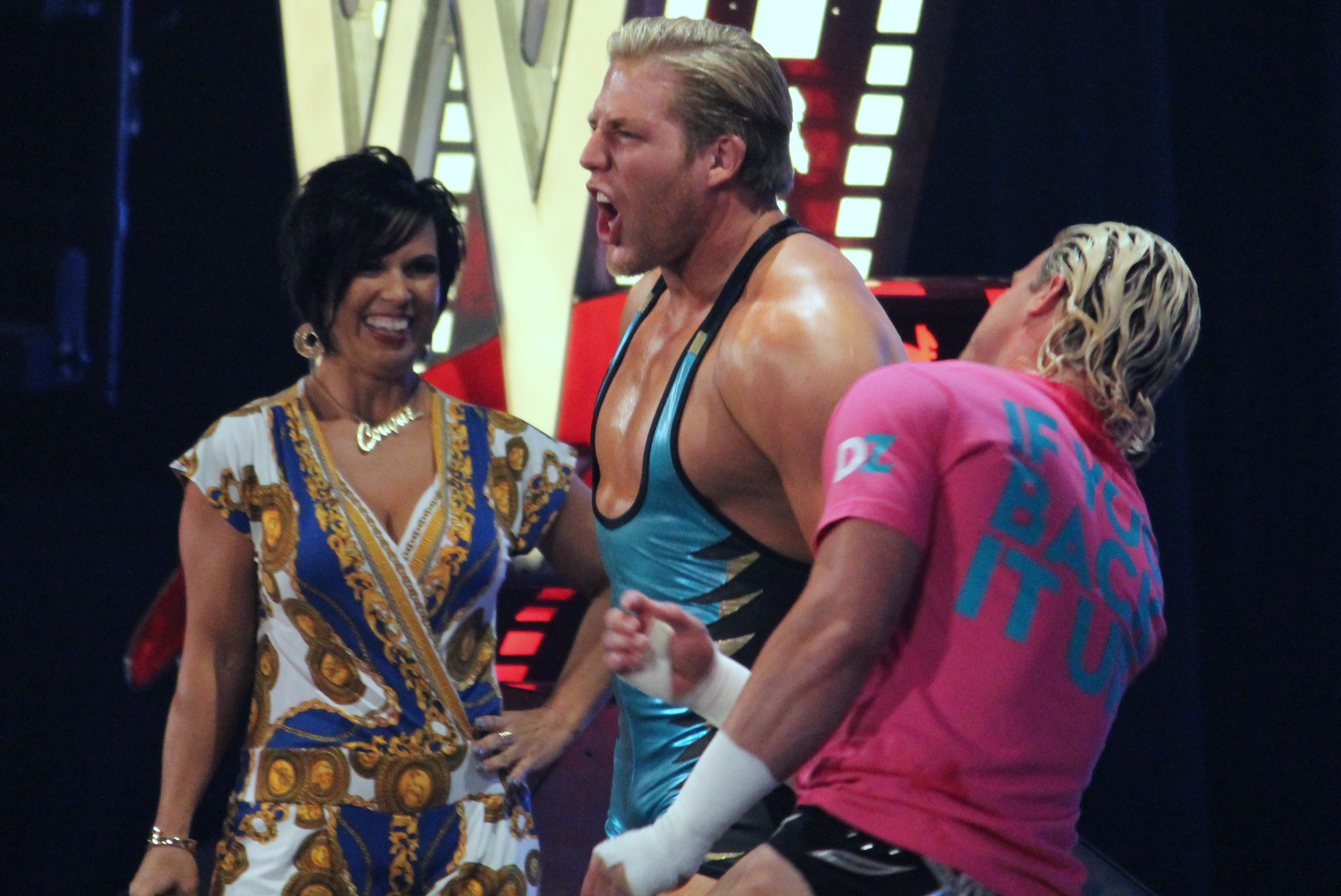
Swagger and Dolph Ziggler (right) being managed by Vickie Guerrero in 2012

On the February 28, 2011 episode of Raw, Swagger was announced as Michael Cole's trainer for his match at WrestleMania XXVII on April 3 against Jerry Lawler. On the March 28 episode of Raw, Swagger faced Lawler in a singles match, which he won by disqualification after Lawler attacked him with a steel chair. At WrestleMania, Swagger received a Stone Cold Stunner from the guest referee, Stone Cold Steve Austin when attempting to withdraw Cole from the match. Cole went on to win the match via disqualification. On April 26, Swagger was drafted to the Raw brand as part of the 2011 supplemental draft. At Extreme Rules on May 1, Swagger teamed with Cole to defeat Jerry Lawler and Jim Ross in a Country Whipping match. Swagger ended his partnership with Cole on the May 16 episode of Raw, after Cole insulted him.

Beginning on May 23, Swagger feuded with Evan Bourne, with both men trading victories on several episodes of Raw. At Capitol Punishment on June 19, Bourne defeated Swagger to end the feud. Swagger competed in his second Money in the Bank ladder match at the Money in the Bank pay-per-view on July 17, which Alberto Del Rio won.

On the August 15 episode of Raw, after defeating Alex Riley, Swagger suggested to Vickie Guerrero that she should manage multiple clients, in the vein of managers like Bobby Heenan and Freddie Blassie. The following week, Swagger had a "tryout" match, but was distracted by Guerrero arguing with Dolph Ziggler at ringside, and lost the match. Swagger and Ziggler continued to fight over Guerrero for the next few weeks, which led to a match being for Ziggler's United States Championship at Night of Champions on September 18, also involving Riley and John Morrison. At Night of Champions, Swagger was unsuccessful in winning the title as Ziggler retained. On the September 19 episode of Raw SuperShow, Guerrero agreed to manage Swagger. As a result, Swagger and Ziggler formed an alliance, with Swagger helping Ziggler retain his championship. At both Hell in a Cell on October 2 and Vengeance on October 23, Swagger and Ziggler unsuccessfully challenged Air Boom (Evan Bourne and Kofi Kingston) for the WWE Tag Team Championship.

On the January 16, 2012, episode of Raw SuperShow, Swagger won the United States Championship for the first time by defeating Zack Ryder. At Elimination Chamber on February 19, Swagger successfully defended his title against Justin Gabriel. On the February 27 episode of Raw SuperShow, Swagger and Ziggler unsuccessfully challenged Primo & Epico for the WWE Tag Team Championship in a triple threat tag team match, also involving Kofi Kingston and R-Truth. On the March 5 episode of Raw SuperShow, Swagger lost the United States Championship to Santino Marella, ending his reign at 49 days. On the following episode of SmackDown, Swagger failed to regain the United States Championship in a steel cage match, after Marella escaped through the cage door. On the March 19 episode of Raw SuperShow, Swagger was announced as a member of Team Johnny at WrestleMania XXVIII on April 1, a match Team Johnny won. On the April 2 episode of Raw SuperShow, Swagger and Ziggler unsuccessfully challenged Marella for the United States Championship in a triple threat match. In May, Swagger and Ziggler unsuccessfully challenged Kofi Kingston and R-Truth for WWE Tag Team Championship, first at Over the Limit on May 20 and second on the May 28 episode of Raw SuperShow. On the June 11 episode of Raw SuperShow, Swagger and Ziggler competed in a fatal four-way elimination match for a number one contenders spot to the World Heavyweight Championship; he was eliminated when Ziggler pinned him. The following week, Guerrero, finally tired of the bickering between Swagger and Ziggler, arranged for a match between them; Ziggler won the match, thus ending their partnership, and also ended his clientele association with Vickie Guerrero.

On the June 25 episode of Raw SuperShow, Swagger once again unsuccessfully challenged Santino Marella for the United States Championship. Following this loss, Swagger went on a three-month losing streak against the likes of Tyson Kidd, Sheamus, Brodus Clay, and Ryback. After again losing to Sheamus on the September 3 episode of Raw, Swagger told Raw General Manager AJ Lee he would take "extended time off".

==== The Real Americans (2013–2014) ====
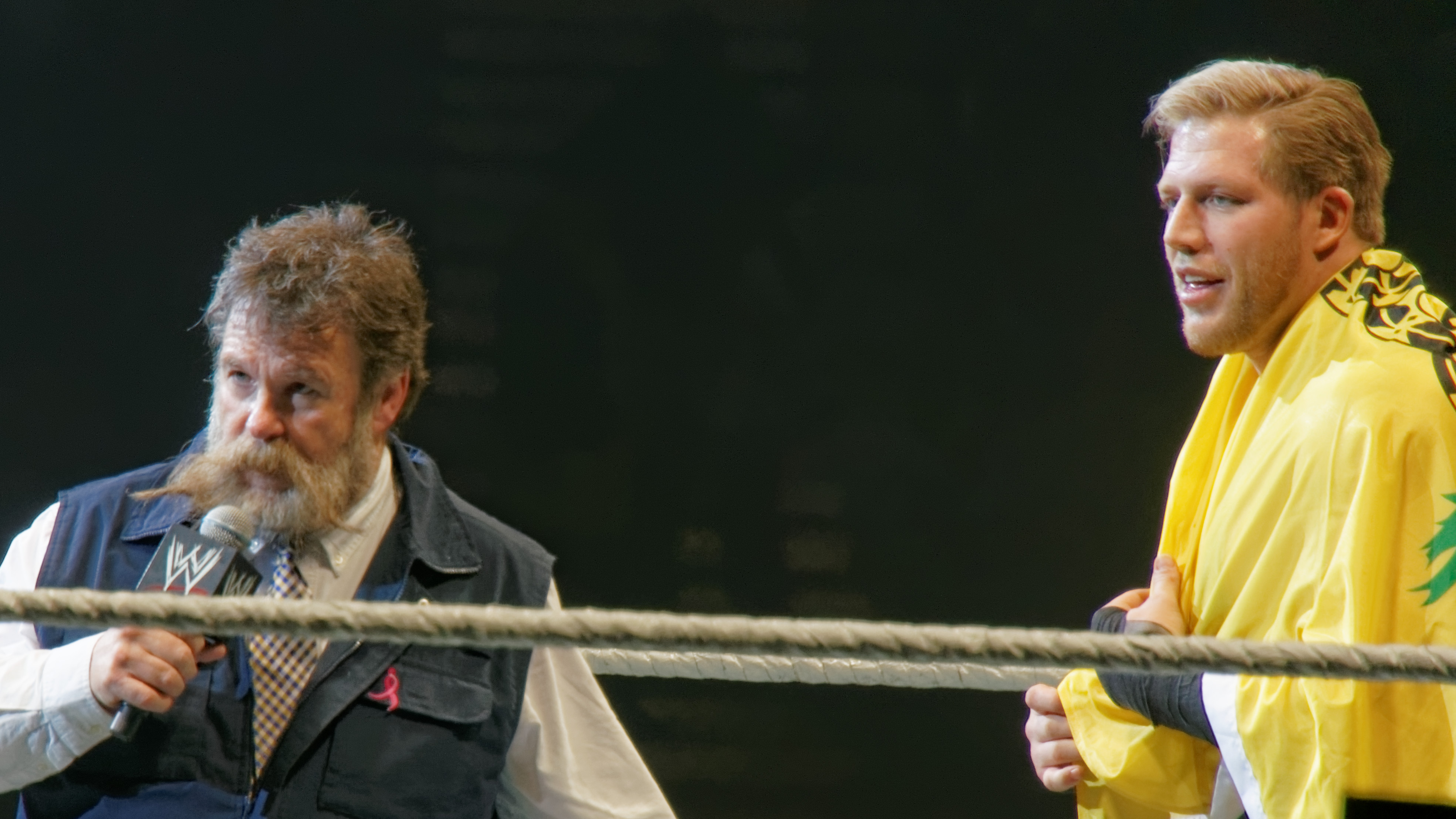
After his return in 2013, Swagger used the Real American gimmick with Zeb Colter as his manager

Swagger returned in February 2013, and was paired with Zeb Colter as his manager, changing his character to a self-proclaimed great American hero who strongly advocated anti-immigration beliefs; Swagger's character was influenced by Colter to display similar traits. At Elimination Chamber on February 17, Swagger won an Elimination Chamber match against Randy Orton, Chris Jericho, Mark Henry, Kane and Daniel Bryan to become the number one contender for the World Heavyweight Championship. Fox News and various conservative commentators including Glenn Beck claimed that Swagger and Colter's characters were a mockery of the Tea Party movement meant to "demonize" the Tea Party. WWE responded to the criticism by stating that they were incorporating "current events into [their] storylines" to "create compelling and relevant content for [their] audience" and that "this storyline in no way represents WWE's political point of view". WWE followed by having Swagger and Colter break character during a video to invite Beck to appear on Raw while justifying that the storyline was designed to elicit a crowd response for the protagonist, Alberto Del Rio, and the antagonists, Swagger and Colter, while remaining within a PG rating, unlike several high-rated scripted dramas that use murder and rape in their storylines. Beck rejected the invitation.

Swagger challenged Del Rio for the World Heavyweight Championship at WrestleMania 29 on April 7, where he was defeated. Swagger would then feud with both Del Rio and Ziggler over the World Heavyweight Championship, with Swagger defeating Ziggler in a non-title match the following week and Del Rio attacking him afterwards. Swagger was originally booked to face Ziggler and Del Rio in three-way ladder match for the World Heavyweight Championship at Extreme Rules on May 19. Swagger legitimately concussed Ziggler with a kick at a SmackDown taping, stopping that plan. As a result of Ziggler's injury, Swagger instead would be booked to face Del Rio in a number one contender I Quit match at the pay-per-view on May 19, which Del Rio won. In June, Swagger took a leave absence to undergo surgery on his hand, which sidelined him for the remainder of the month.

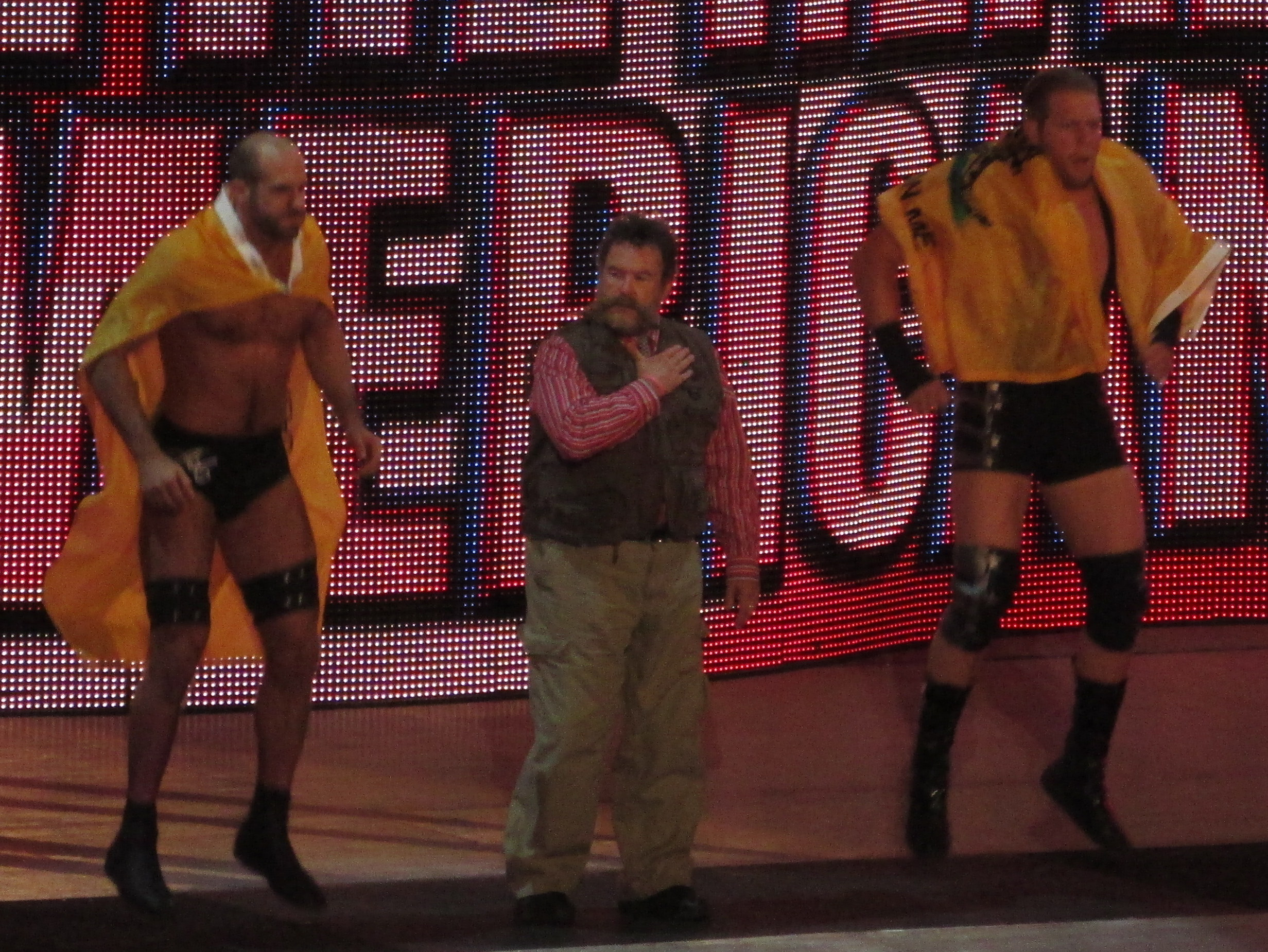
Swagger with Colter and Cesaro as The Real Americans

When Swagger returned, he and Colter were paired with Antonio Cesaro as the tag team The Real Americans. They feuded with Santino Marella and Los Matadores, culminating in a tag team match on October 27 at Hell in a Cell, which Los Matadores won. At Survivor Series on November 24, Swagger teamed with Cesaro, Roman Reigns, Dean Ambrose and Seth Rollins in a 5 on 5 traditional Survivor Series tag team match in which their team was victorious. At TLC: Tables, Ladders & Chairs on December 15, they also challenged for the WWE Tag Team Championship again in a losing effort in a fatal four-way match also involving RybAxel and the team of Big Show and Rey Mysterio. On the February 14, 2014 episode of SmackDown, Swagger became the #1 Contender for the Intercontinental Championship after winning a Fatal 4-Way match, defeating Kofi Kingston, Rey Mysterio and Mark Henry. Swagger advanced to Elimination Chamber on February 23, where he lost to Intercontinental Champion Big E.

During the pre-show of WrestleMania XXX on April 6, the Real Americans were the final team eliminated during a fatal-four-way match for the WWE Tag Team Championship. Swagger blamed Cesaro for the loss and put Cesaro in the Patriot Lock before Colter demanded that the duo shake hands. Cesaro instead retaliated with a Cesaro Swing on Swagger. Later during the pay-per-view, Cesaro was a surprise entrant in the André the Giant Memorial Battle Royal, which he won by last eliminating Big Show by body slamming him out of the ring, which mirrored Hulk Hogan's momentous body slam of André. Swagger retaliated by attacking Cesaro on the following Raw and then destroying the trophy, thus ending the stable.

==== Final feuds (2014–2017) ====
Following the dissolution of their team, Swagger would feud with Cesaro, with Rob Van Dam also being drawn into the feud, with the three competing in a triple threat elimination match at Extreme Rules on May 4, which Cesaro won. On the June 30 episode of Raw, Swagger turned face for the first time in WWE, after he and Colter would confront Rusev and Lana about them disrespecting America. This would lead to a number of matches between the two, with Swagger being defeated by Rusev at both Battleground on July 20 and SummerSlam on August 17. On the December 1 episode of Raw, Swagger would find Colter assaulted backstage, with Rusev later admitting to the attack. At TLC: Tables, Ladders and Chairs on December 14, Swagger would challenge Rusev for the United States Championship, in a losing effort and ending their feud.

Following his match with Rusev at TLC, Swagger began to appear on television less frequently. At the Royal Rumble on January 25, 2015, Swagger competed in the Royal Rumble match, lasting a while before he was eliminated by Big Show. At WrestleMania 31 on March 29, Swagger participated in the 2nd Annual André the Giant Memorial Battle Royal, in which he was again eliminated by Big Show. Swagger appeared on the November 2 episode of Raw, encountering his former manager Zeb Colter, only to be interrupted by Alberto Del Rio, Colter's new client. This started a feud between the two, which culminated at TLC: Tables, Ladders and Chairs on December 13 with Swagger challenging Del Rio for the WWE United States Championship in a Chairs match, which Del Rio won. At the 2015 Tribute to the Troops event, Swagger defeated Rusev by submission in a "Boot Camp" match.

On January 24, 2016, at the Royal Rumble, during the kick-off show, Swagger teamed with Mark Henry in a winning effort against the teams of Darren Young and Damien Sandow, The Dudley Boyz and The Ascension. As a result of the win, Swagger qualified for the Royal Rumble match itself during the main show; entering as the 24th entrant, only to be quickly eliminated by Brock Lesnar lasting only 16 seconds. At Roadblock on March 12, Swagger would be defeated by Chris Jericho. At WrestleMania 32 on April 3, Swagger would compete in the Andre The Giant Memorial Battle Royal, which was won by Baron Corbin. On the June 6 episode of Raw, Swagger faced long-time rival Rusev in Swagger's home state of Oklahoma in a losing effort via count-out. After the match, Swagger attacked Rusev before leading the crowd in a "We the People" chant. On the July 4 episode of Raw, Swagger was part of the main-event, where he teamed with "Team USA", which consisted of himself, Big Show, Kane, Apollo Crews, Mark Henry, Zack Ryder and the Dudley Boyz, in a 16-man elimination tag team match, in which their team was victorious over "The Multinational Alliance", which consisted of Kevin Owens, Chris Jericho, Sami Zayn, Cesaro, Sheamus, Alberto Del Rio and the Lucha Dragons (Kalisto and Sin Cara).

In the 2016 WWE draft, Swagger was drafted to the Raw brand. On the September 12 episode of Raw, Swagger faced Jinder Mahal in a losing effort. After the match, Tom Phillips revealed to Swagger that his "Raw contract" expired soon, in which Swagger ignored Phillips and walked away. The following night, he switched brands on SmackDown, interrupting Baron Corbin and stating that he has signed exclusively to the brand. Swagger defeated Corbin on the October 4 episode of SmackDown after the referee thought he submitted when he was actually trying to reach the bottom rope. Corbin would then defeat Swagger twice, at the No Mercy pay-per-view on October 9 and again on the October 18 episode of SmackDown, ending the feud, this would be Swagger's last televised match in WWE.

On March 1, 2017, Hager announced on Chael Sonnen's podcast that he had requested his release from WWE. Two days later, WWE issued a statement saying that Hager had not been granted his release. This was in response to Hager already having been announced for an independent date. On March 13, 2017, it was announced that WWE had officially granted Hager his release.

=== Independent circuit (2017–2019) ===
Hager returned to professional wrestling on the independent circuit in 2017. He announced (using his Jack Swagger ring name) that he would be joining the House of Hardcore 2017 Australian tour. The Australia tour consisted of four events between June 16 and 24, 2017. In February 2018, Hager joined 5 Star Wrestling and won the heavyweight title, defeating John Morrison. The promotion closed in March 2018 with Hager being the second and final champion. Jack Swagger also wrestled for PPW and became the PPW Heavyweight Champion on PPW High Voltage, February 11, 2018.

On April 20, 2018, Hager defeated MVP to become the Imperial Wrestling Revolution champion. On November 24, 2018, Hager unsuccessfully challenged Nick Aldis for the NWA World Heavyweight Championship at WrestleCade: SuperShow

=== Lucha Underground (2018) ===
On the second episode of season 4 of Lucha Underground on June 20, 2018, Hager made his debut as a heel. Under the name of "The Savage" Jake Strong, he joined Infamous Inc. with Sammy Guevara and Big Bad Steve, facing the Trios Champions The Mack, Son of Havoc and Killshot. After his team lost, Strong attacked every member, including Infamous Inc manager, Famous B. Strong then started a feud with Drago and Aerostar, defeating both in singles matches and in a handicap Nunchaku match. On October 17, Strong won a 7-man battle royal by last eliminating A. R. Fox and that same night, he defeated Johnny Mundo. The next week, Strong won a seven-to-seven survive elimination match to win the Lucha Underground Gift of the Gods Championship. On the final day of Ultima Lucha Cuatro, which was also the final episode of season 4, Strong cashed his Gift of the Gods Championship on Pentagon Dark, who had just defeated Marty Martinez to win the Lucha Underground Championship, and proceeded to defeat Pentagon Dark to become the new Lucha Underground Champion. Lucha Underground was discontinued after the season four finale, therefore making Strong the final Lucha Underground Champion.

=== Major League Wrestling (2018) ===
On May 3, 2018, Hager made his Major League Wrestling debut against Jeff Cobb.

=== All Elite Wrestling (2019–2024) ===
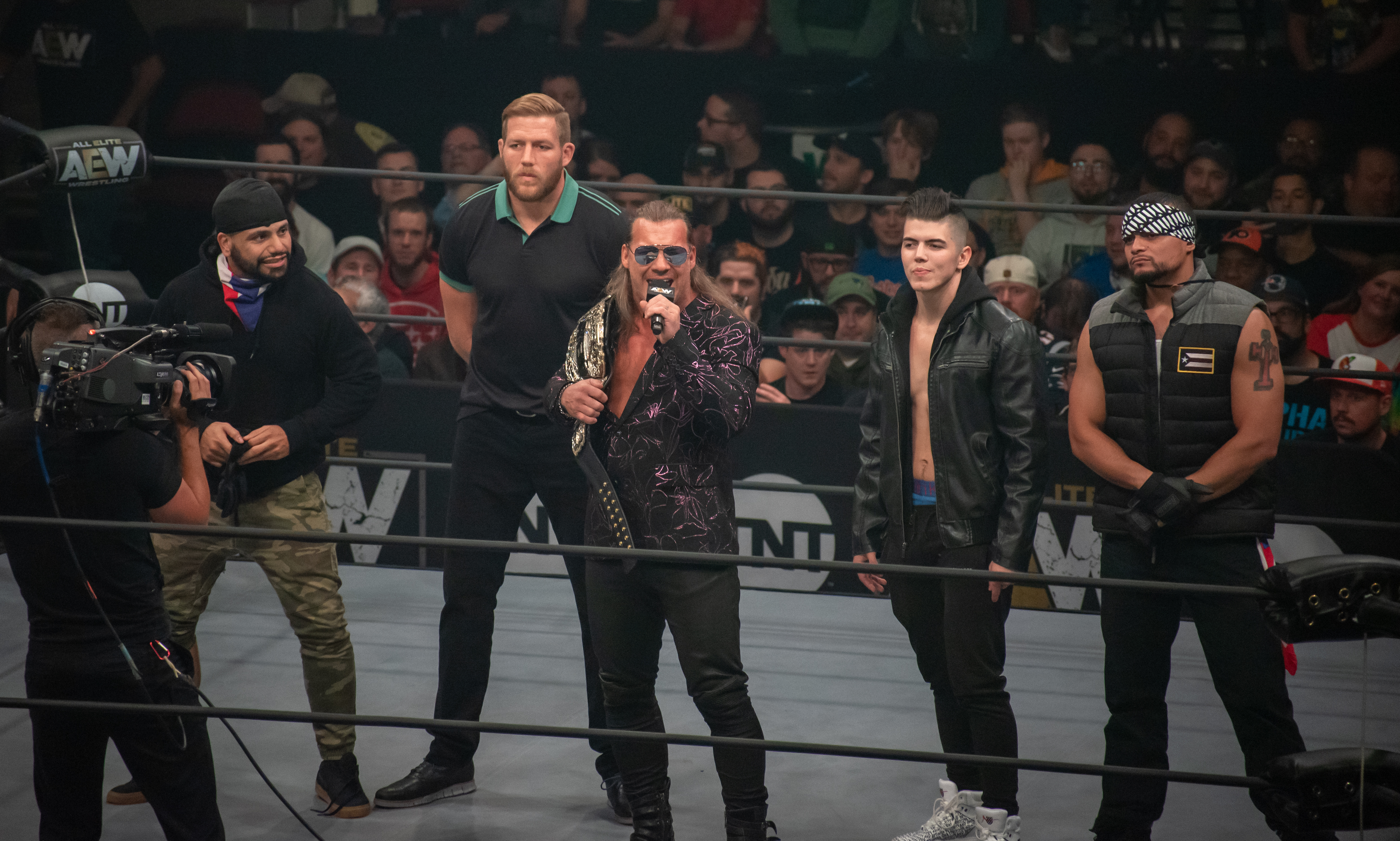
Hager (second from left) was associated with Chris Jericho (center) during his entire AEW career, first in the Inner Circle (shown here in 2019), then as part of the Jericho Appreciation Society

On October 2, 2019, Hager debuted in All Elite Wrestling (AEW) on the inaugural episode of AEW Dynamite, aligning himself with Chris Jericho, Santana and Ortiz, and Sammy Guevara by helping them take out The Young Bucks, Cody, and Dustin Rhodes in the aftermath of the main event. Led by Jericho, he subsequently formed a new faction with Guevara, Santana, and Ortiz called the Inner Circle. His in-ring debut match for AEW occurred on February 29, 2020, at Revolution, where he defeated Dustin Rhodes. After this, Hager began a feud with AEW World Champion Jon Moxley, leading to an Empty Arena No Holds Barred match for the championship on the April 15 episode of Dynamite. Hager was defeated, marking his first loss in AEW. In the main event of Double or Nothing on May 23, the Inner Circle was defeated by Matt Hardy and The Elite ("Hangman" Adam Page, Kenny Omega, Matt Jackson and Nick Jackson) in a Stadium Stampede match. He unsuccessfully challenged Cody for the TNT Championship at the Fyter Fest event on July 1. He competed in the Casino Battle Royale at All Out in September, but was eliminated by Sonny Kiss. This led to a short storyline, with Hager teaming with Jericho to defeat Kiss and Joey Janela in a no disqualification tag team match on the September 9 episode of Dynamite.

In 2021, Hager would be involved in the Inner Circle's feud with The Pinnacle (MJF, Wardlow, Shawn Spears, Cash Wheeler and Dax Harwood), with the Inner Circle being defeated by them in the first ever Blood and Guts match at the namesake event in May. The Inner Circle would defeat the Pinnacle in a Stadium Stampede match at Double or Nothing on May 30, and Hager defeated Pinnacle member Wardlow in an MMA rules-inspired cage match on the June 18 episode of Dynamite. At Full Gear in November, the Inner Circle defeated Men of the Year (Ethan Page and Scorpio Sky) and American Top Team (Junior dos Santos, Andrei Arlovski, and Dan Lambert) in a street fight.

On the February 9, 2022 episode of AEW Dynamite, the Inner Circle had a team meeting that ended with Sammy Guevara throwing his vest down and walking out. It was later announced that Jericho and Hager would face Santana and Ortiz in a tag team match the following week, with it being billed as the Inner Circle Implodes match. On the March 9 episode of Dynamite, the Inner Circle was disbanded after Hager assisted Jericho in attacking Santana and Ortiz and joined a new stable with Jericho, Daniel Garcia and 2point0 called the Jericho Appreciation Society. Starting with the October 5 episode of Dynamite, Hager began wearing a purple bucket hat that had been rejected by Garcia as a gift from Jericho the week before and not wanting the gift to go to waste. The absurd gimmick proved to be popular with fans on social media, leading to Hager to officially adopt it as his persona and tell everyone that he "liked this hat". This included pictures of Hager wearing the hat everywhere including during wrestling matches. At the Thanksgiving Eve special episode on November 23, Hager challenged Orange Cassidy for the AEW All-Atlantic Championship but was defeated. During his later appearances in AEW, he would be mostly used in lower-card roles, competing mostly on AEW's secondary shows Rampage and Dark throughout 2023 and 2024. He unsuccessfully challenged Wardlow for the TNT Championship on the June 17, 2023 episode of Dynamite. Hager competed in a battle royal on the All Out pre-show on September 3, but was eliminated by Scorpio Sky. On the February 21, 2024 episode of Rampage, Hager was defeated by Roderick Strong in what would be his final AEW appearance. On May 28, it was reported that his contract had expired and he had elected not to re-sign.

After leaving AEW, Hager was critical of AEW president Tony Khan, accusing Khan of being a communist after claiming that Khan threatened to fire him due to his support of Donald Trump and called Khan "unprofessional" for interrupting a talent meeting. The latter story has been disputed by AEW wrestlers FTR (Cash Wheeler and Dax Harwood).

=== Return to independent circuit (2024–2026) ===
After leaving AEW, Hager returned to working on the independent circuit. On November 2, 2024, Hager was defeated by Connor Mills at Banger Zone Wrestling (BZW) in what would be his final match. On August 7, 2025, Hager announced his retirement from professional wrestling.

On June 27, 2026, Hager would come out of retirement for World Wrestling Council, where he challenged John Hawking for the WWC Caribbean Heavyweight Championship at Aniversario 53 in a losing effort.

== Mixed martial arts career ==
On November 13, 2017, Hager announced that he had signed to fight for Bellator MMA as part of its heavyweight division. He debuted at Bellator 214 on January 26, 2019, defeating J.W. Kiser via submission at 2:09 of the first round.

In Hager's second fight with the promotion, he faced T.J. Jones on May 11, 2019, at Bellator 221. He again won the fight via an arm-triangle choke in the first round. Controversy arose as Hager held on to the choke for several seconds after Jones had tapped. This caused referee Mike Beltran to pull Hager off of Jones amid boos.

For his third fight with the promotion, Hager faced Anthony Garrett at Bellator 231 on October 25, 2019. The bout ended in a no contest early into the first round after Hager landed two unintentional groin strikes to Garrett, the latter one rendering Garrett unable to continue.

Hager faced Brandon Calton at Bellator 250 on October 29, 2020. He won the bout via split decision.

Hager retired from MMA in September 2023.

== Slap fighting career ==
On March 2, 2026, it was announced that Hager had signed with Power Slap and would be competing at the April 17, 2026 event. He won his debut match against Devin 'Big Jinxx' Jenkins by KO in the third round.

On July 10, 2026, Hager was knocked out by Amanpreet Singh in the third round of the Power Slap 21 card in Las Vegas.

On September 17, 2026, Hager faced Johnny Magna at Power Slap 23 and lost the bout via doctor stoppage in the second round due to an eye injury. After the bout, Hager began bleeding from his left eye and later underwent emergency surgery for a detached retina.

== Mixed martial arts record ==
Professional record breakdown
| 4 matches | 3 wins | 0 losses |
| By submission | 2 | 0 |
| By decision | 1 | 0 |
| No contests | 1 | |

| Res. | Record | Opponent | Method | Event | Date | Round | Time | Location | Notes |
|---|---|---|---|---|---|---|---|---|---|
| Win | 3–0 (1) | Brandon Calton | Decision (split) | Bellator 250 | October 29, 2020 | 3 | 5:00 | Uncasville, Connecticut, United States | |
| NC | 2–0 (1) | Anthony Garrett | NC (accidental groin strikes) | Bellator 231 | October 25, 2019 | 1 | 1:56 | Uncasville, Connecticut, United States | Repeated inadvertent groin strikes from Hager rendered Garrett unable to continue. |
| Win | 2–0 | T.J. Jones | Submission (arm-triangle choke) | Bellator 221 | May 11, 2019 | 1 | 2:36 | Rosemont, Illinois, United States | |
| Win | 1–0 | J.W. Kiser | Submission (arm-triangle choke) | Bellator 214 | January 26, 2019 | 1 | 2:09 | Inglewood, California, United States | |

== Slap fighting record ==
Professional record breakdown
| 3 matches | 1 win | 2 losses |
| By knockout | 1 | 2 |

| Res. | Record | Opponent | Method | Event | Date | Round | Time | Location | Notes |
|---|---|---|---|---|---|---|---|---|---|
| Loss | 1–2 | Johnny Magna | TKO (eye injury) | Power Slap 23 | September 17, 2026 | 2 | N/A | Las Vegas, Nevada, United States | |
| Loss | 1–1 | Amanpreet Singh | KO | Power Slap 21 | July 10, 2026 | 3 | N/A | Las Vegas, Nevada, United States | |
| Win | 1–0 | Devin Jenkins | KO | Power Slap 19 | April 17, 2026 | 3 | N/A | Las Vegas, Nevada, United States | Slap fighting debut. |

== Personal life ==
Hager resides in Tampa, Florida. He married Catalina White in December 2010. The couple met in FCW, where White wrestled under the name Saylor James. They have two children. They have since divorced.

In March 2019, Hager released the first issue of his biographical comic book series, You Don't Know Jack: The Jake Hager Story, through the publisher of Squared Circle Comics.

In August 2025, Hager revealed that he had founded his own trucking company called Haulin' Oates Trucking.

On February 19, 2013, Hager was arrested in Gulfport, Mississippi, after a SmackDown taping. He was charged with driving under the influence and possession of marijuana. Hager was released from custody after the arrest and was ordered to appear in court on March 12, 2013. He was then scheduled to stand trial on June 25, 2013, in Mississippi. The marijuana charge was dismissed after he was fined $500, and sentenced to six months probation with his two-day jail sentence being suspended.

== Championships and accomplishments ==
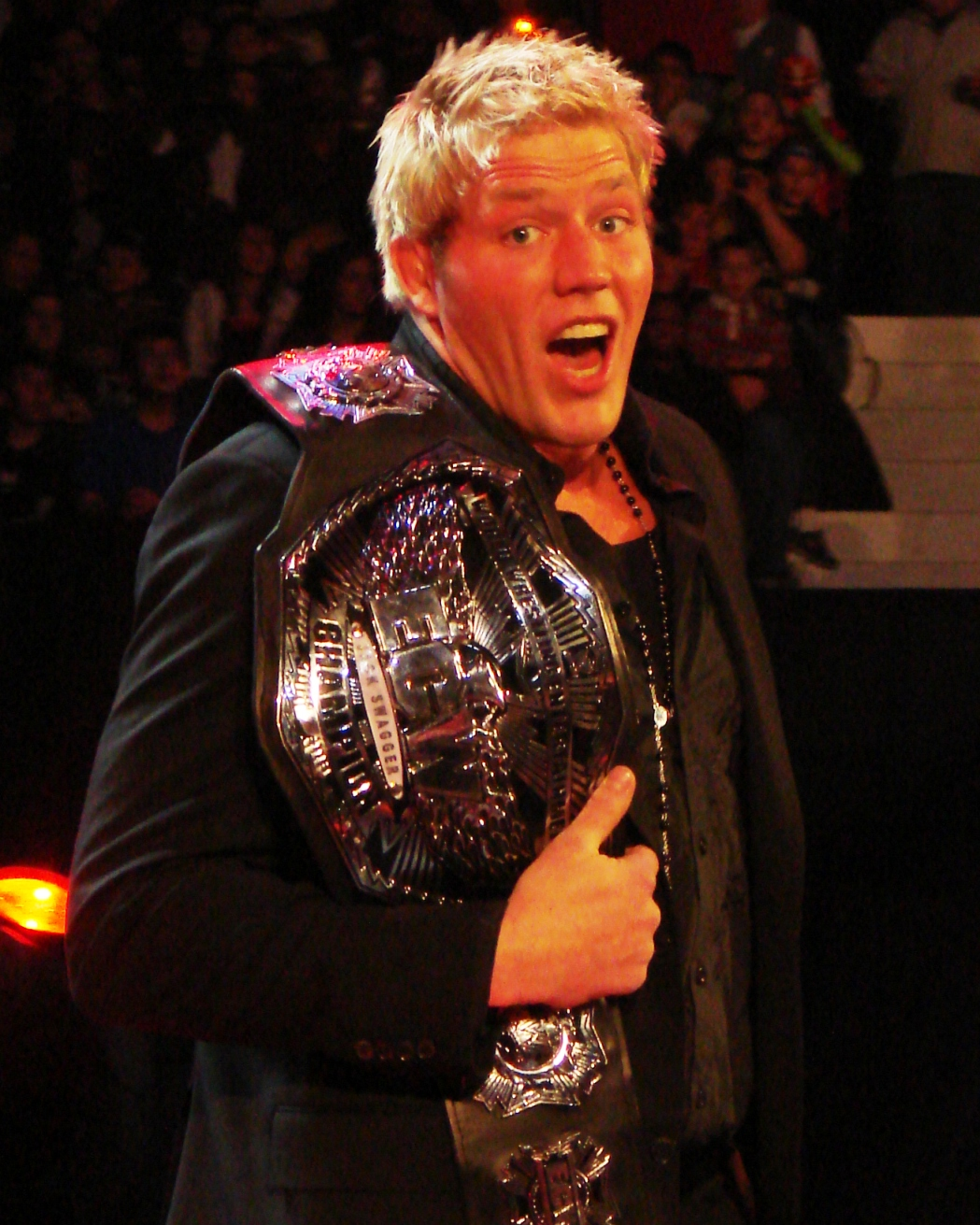
In WWE, Hager (as Jack Swagger), former ECW Champion

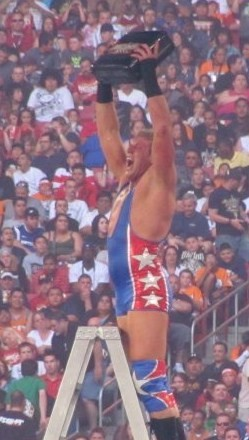
Hager at WrestleMania XXVI

=== Amateur wrestling ===
- Oklahoma Secondary School Activities Association
  - Oklahoma 2A I 215 lb state champion out of Perry High School (2000)
- National Collegiate Athletic Association
  - University of Oklahoma single-season record for most pins in the 285 pounds (129 kg) weight class (30)
  - 2006 Collegiate All-American

=== Professional wrestling ===
- 5 Star Wrestling
  - 5 Star Wrestling Championship (1 time, final)
- All Elite Wrestling
  - Dynamite Award (2 times)
    - "Bleacher Report PPV Moment of the Year" (2021) – Stadium Stampede match (The Elite vs. The Inner Circle) – Double or Nothing (May 23)
    - "Biggest Beatdown" (2021) – The Inner Circle jumping Orange Cassidy – Dynamite (June 10)
- All Star Wrestling
  - All Star Wrestling Heavyweight Championship (1 time)
- The Baltimore Sun
  - Most Improved Wrestler of the Year (2010)
- Florida Championship Wrestling
  - FCW Florida Heavyweight Championship (1 time)
  - FCW Southern Heavyweight Championship (1 time)
- George Tragos/Lou Thesz Professional Wrestling Hall of Fame
  - Class of 2025
- Imperial Wrestling Revolution
  - IWR Heavyweight Championship (1 time)
- Lucha Underground
  - Lucha Underground Championship (1 time, final)
  - Lucha Underground Gift of the Gods Championship (1 time, final)
- Northeast Wrestling
  - NEW Heavyweight Championship (1 time)
- Pennsylvania Premiere Wrestling
  - PPW Heavyweight Championship (1 time)
- Pro Wrestling Illustrated
  - Faction of the Year (2021) – with The Inner Circle
  - Ranked No. 18 of the top 500 singles wrestlers in the PWI 500 in 2009
- World Class Revolution
  - WCR Heavyweight Championship (1 time)
- World Wrestling Entertainment / WWE
  - World Heavyweight Championship (1 time)
  - ECW Championship (1 time)
  - WWE United States Championship (1 time)
  - Money in the Bank (2010)
  - Bragging Rights Trophy (2010) – with Team SmackDown (Big Show, Rey Mysterio, Kofi Kingston, Alberto Del Rio, Edge and Tyler Reks)
