= Ralph Foster (tackle) =

American football player (1917–1999)

No. 60, 64
- Position: Tackle

Personal information
- Born: June 12, 1917; Perry, Oklahoma, U.S.
- Died: June 3, 1999 (aged 81)
- Listed height: 6 ft 0 in (1.83 m)
- Listed weight: 230 lb (104 kg)

Career information
- High school: Perry
- College: Idaho; Oklahoma A&M
- NFL draft: 1940: 17th round, 151st overall pick

Career history
- Chicago Cardinals (1945–1946); Boston Yanks (1947)*
- * Offseason or practice squad member only

Career NFL statistics
- Games played: 19
- Games started: 9
- Fumble recoveries: 2
- Stats at Pro Football Reference

Ralph Ellsworth Foster, Jr. (June 12, 1917 – June 3, 1999) was an American professional football tackle who played two seasons with the Chicago Cardinals of the National Football League (NFL). He played college football at the University of Idaho and Oklahoma A&M College.

== Early life and college ==
Ralph Ellsworth Foster, Jr. was born on June 12, 1917, in Perry, Oklahoma. He attended Perry High School in Perry.

Foster was a member of the Idaho Vandals of the University of Idaho in 1936. He was then a three-year letterman for the Oklahoma A&M Cowboys of Oklahoma Agricultural and Mechanical College from 1937 to 1939. Afterward, he served in the United States Navy during World War II. He was discharged from the Navy after contracting asthma in New Caledonia. Foster returned to Oklahoma A&M in 1944 and was both a team captain and letterman that year.

== Professional career ==
Foster was selected by the Chicago Cardinals in the 17th round, with the 151st overall pick, of the 1940 NFL draft. He signed with the Cardinals in 1945. He played in nine games, starting five, for the team during the 1945 season. Foster appeared in ten games, starting four, in 1946 and recovered two fumbles. He became a free agent after the season.

Foster signed with the Boston Yanks of the NFL in 1947 but was later released.

== Personal life ==
Foster died on June 3, 1999.
