= Perry Public Schools (Oklahoma) =

School district in Oklahoma

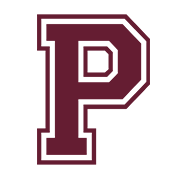

Location
- 900 Fir Street; Perry, Oklahoma 73077 Noble County United States

District information
- Type: Public, Primary, Secondary, Co-Educational
- Motto: Home of the Maroons
- Grades: Lower Elementary PK-2; Upper Elementary 3-6; Junior High 7-8; High School 9-12
- Superintendent: Chad Wilson
- Schools: 4

Students and staff
- Students: 1114 (2018-19)
- Teachers: 66.23 (FTE)
- Athletic conference: 3A

Other information
- Website: www.perry.k12.ok.us

The Perry Public School District is located in Perry, Oklahoma, United States. The Perry school district has four schools.

The district is managed by the Superintendent Chad Wilson, who works under the direction of a five-person board.

The mascot of both the district and the high school is the Maroons.

== Schools ==
=== High school ===
- Perry High School (Grades 9-12)

=== Middle school ===
- Perry Junior High School (Grades 7-8)

=== Elementary schools ===
- Perry Upper Elementary School (Grades 3-6)
- Perry Lower Elementary School (Grades PK-2)
