= Bruce Brubaker (baseball) =

American baseball player (born 1941)

- Pitcher
- Born: December 29, 1941 (age 84); Harrisburg, Pennsylvania, U.S.
- Batted: Right Threw: Right

MLB debut
- April 15, 1967, for the Los Angeles Dodgers

Last MLB appearance
- August 5, 1970, for the Milwaukee Brewers

MLB statistics
- Win–loss record: 0–0
- Earned run average: 13.50
- Strikeouts: 2
- Stats at Baseball Reference

Teams
- Los Angeles Dodgers (1967); Milwaukee Brewers (1970)

Bruce Ellsworth Brubaker Jr. (born December 29, 1941) is an American former pitcher in Major League Baseball who appeared in two major league games, one for the Los Angeles Dodgers in 1967 and one for the Milwaukee Brewers in 1970 during a professional career that lasted for 14 years (1959–1972). The native of Harrisburg, Pennsylvania, threw and batted right-handed, stood 6 feet 1 inch (1.85 m) tall and weighed 198 pounds (90 kg).

== Biography ==
Brubaker's two MLB appearances came as a relief pitcher during lopsided losses, by his Dodgers to the St. Louis Cardinals (13–4) on April 15, 1967, and his Brewers to the Chicago White Sox (9–3) on August 5, 1970. In the former game, he allowed a three-run home run to Baseball Hall of Famer Lou Brock, and in the latter contest, he gave up a two-run blast to journeyman Syd O'Brien. Those five runs were all that he allowed in the majors in 31/3 innings pitched. He gave up five hits and one base on balls, with two strikeouts.

During his minor league career, Brubaker won 117 games.

== Family ==
He currently resides in Owensboro, Kentucky, where he owns a Ford/Lincoln/Mazda car dealership named Champion. In May 2010, the Brubaker family opened another Ford dealership in Rockport (REO) Indiana, which has now consolidated with their Owensboro store in November 2018. In May 2011, the family opened Championship 54 Autos in Owensboro. Brubaker has been married for more than 58 years to Leda. Has two sons, Bruce Ellsworth "Duke" Brubaker III and Tyler C. Brubaker, and four grandchildren.

On May 14, 2010, Brubaker was inducted into the Pennsylvania Sports Hall of Fame. His father, Bruce Ellsworth "Hushpuppy" Brubaker Sr., is also a member of the Pennsylvania Sports Hall of Fame. Brubaker's nephew is Jorge Posada of the New York Yankees; Posada's mother is the sister of Brubaker's wife.
