= John Duffie =

American baseball player (1945–2018)

- Pitcher
- Born: October 4, 1945; Greenwood, South Carolina, U.S.
- Died: April 19, 2018 (aged 72); Douglas, Georgia, U.S.
- Batted: Right Threw: Right

MLB debut
- September 18, 1967, for the Los Angeles Dodgers

Last MLB appearance
- September 24, 1967, for the Los Angeles Dodgers

MLB statistics
- Win–loss record: 0–2
- Earned run average: 2.79
- Strikeouts: 6
- Stats at Baseball Reference

Teams
- Los Angeles Dodgers (1967)

John Brown Duffie (October 4, 1945 – April 19, 2018) was an American pitcher in Major League Baseball. He was the starting pitcher in two games for the Los Angeles Dodgers during the 1967 MLB season. Duffie died on April 19, 2018, at the age of 72 at Coffee Regional Medical Center following a brief illness.
