= Bob Lee (baseball) =

American baseball player (1937–2020)

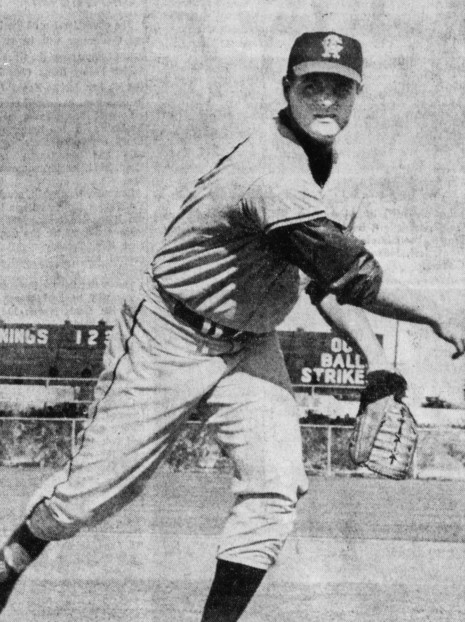
- Pitcher
- Born: November 26, 1937; Ottumwa, Iowa, U.S.
- Died: March 25, 2020 (aged 82); Lake Havasu City, Arizona, U.S.
- Batted: Right Threw: Right

MLB debut
- April 15, 1964, for the Los Angeles Angels

Last MLB appearance
- August 25, 1968, for the Cincinnati Reds

MLB statistics
- Win–loss record: 25–23
- Earned run average: 2.71
- Strikeouts: 315
- Saves: 64
- Stats at Baseball Reference

Teams
- Los Angeles / California Angels (1964–1966); Los Angeles Dodgers (1967); Cincinnati Reds (1967–1968)

Career highlights and awards
- All-Star (1965)

Robert Dean Lee (November 26, 1937 – March 25, 2020) was an American closer and spot starter in Major League Baseball who played from 1964 through 1968 for the Los Angeles Dodgers, Los Angeles/California Angels, and the Cincinnati Reds. Listed at 6 feet 3 inches (1.91 m), 225 pounds (102 kg), Lee batted and threw right handed. He was nicknamed ″Moose″, ″Horse″ and ″Big Bob″.

Born in Ottumwa, Iowa on November 26, 1937, Lee graduated from Bellflower High School in Bellflower, California. He was originally signed by the Pittsburgh Pirates organization as an amateur free agent in 1956 and also pitched eight years in the Minor leagues.

Lee entered the majors in 1964 with the Angels, pitching one inning of scoreless relief with two strikeouts in a 6–4 loss to the Washington Senators at D.C. Stadium.

He finished his rookie season with a 6–5 record and a 1.51 earned run average in 64 games, setting a personal record with 111 strikeouts. In 1965 he went 9–7 with a 1.92 ERA in 69 games, following with a 5–4 record and a 2.74 ERA in 61 appearances in the 1966 season. During this period he amassed 58 saves, to rank among the top 10 American League relievers in saves, pitching appearances (194) and games finished (128).

In addition, Lee posted a franchise record with 21 scoreless innings pitched between 1964 and 1965, which stood for 48 years until Jered Weaver set a new mark in July 2013. Lee also was selected to the 1965 American League All Star Team, even though he did not pitch in the game held at Metropolitan Stadium.

Before the 1967 season, he was sent to the Dodgers in the same transaction that brought Nick Willhite to California. He pitched in only four games for Los Angeles before being purchased by Cincinnati in the midseason. Nevertheless, Lee never matched the success of his first three seasons, as he went 3–3 with a 4.44 ERA in 27 games for the Reds the rest of the year. He followed with a 2–4 record and a 5.15 ERA in 44 games in 1968, during what turned out to be his Major League's final season.

In between, Lee had a 59–58 record and a 3.83 ERA over parts of eight minor league seasons spanning 1956–1963. He also pitched for the Tiburones de La Guaira and Leones del Caracas clubs of the Venezuelan Winter League between 1963 and 1969.

In 2011 the Angels had a former player throw out the ceremonial first pitch of each of the team's 81 home games. Lee threw out the first pitch of the April 10, 2011 game.

Lee died on March 25, 2020, at his home in Lake Havasu City, Arizona.
