= Perry High School (Oklahoma) =

Location
- 900 Fir Street; Perry, Oklahoma 73077; United States; 36.2893°N 97.2918°W

Information
- Type: Public, secondary school
- Motto: Home of the Maroons
- School district: Perry Public Schools
- Principal: Brandon Hight
- Teaching staff: 20.72 (FTE)
- Grades: 9-12
- Gender: Co-educational
- Enrollment: 315 (2023-2024)
- Student to teacher ratio: 15.20
- Colors: Maroon and white
- Athletics conference: OSSAA Class 3A
- Mascot: Maroon
- Website: Perry Public Schools

Perry High School is a public secondary school in Perry, Oklahoma, United States. It is located at 900 Fir Street in Perry, Oklahoma and the only high school in Perry Public Schools.

== Extracurricular activities ==
=== Clubs and organizations ===
- 4-H
- FCA
- FFA
- National Honor Society
- Quiz Bowl
- Student Council
- SWAT
- Yearbook

=== Athletics ===
- Basketball
- Baseball
- Cheerleading
- Cross Country
- Football
- Golf
- Softball
- Tennis
- Track
- Wrestling
